= List of For All Mankind characters =

For All Mankind is an American science fiction drama television series created and written by Ronald D. Moore, Matt Wolpert and Ben Nedivi and produced for Apple TV+. The series dramatizes an alternate history depicting "what would have happened if the global space race had never ended" after the Soviet Union succeeds in the first crewed Moon landing ahead of the United States. It premiered on November 1, 2019. The fifth season premiered on March 27, 2026. Prior to the fifth-season premiere, the series was renewed for a sixth and final season, set to premiere in 2027. In April 2024, it was announced that Star City, a spinoff series focusing on the Soviet space program, was in development.

In an alternate timeline in 1969, Soviet cosmonaut Alexei Leonov becomes the first human to land on the Moon. This outcome devastates morale at NASA, but also catalyzes an American effort to catch up. With the Soviet Union emphasizing diversity by including a woman in subsequent landings, the United States is forced to match pace, training women and minorities who were largely excluded from the initial decades of U.S. space exploration. Each subsequent season takes place ten years later, with season two taking place in the 1980s, season three in the 1990s, season four in the 2000s, and season five in the 2010s.

The series stars an ensemble cast including Joel Kinnaman, Michael Dorman, Sarah Jones, Shantel VanSanten, Jodi Balfour and Wrenn Schmidt. Sonya Walger and Krys Marshall had recurring roles in the first season before being promoted to the main cast for the second season, while Cynthy Wu, Casey W. Johnson and Coral Peña newly joined the cast, with Johnson and Peña playing older versions of characters that were portrayed by child actors in the first season. The third season saw Edi Gathegi also joining, while the fourth season added Toby Kebbell, Tyner Rushing, Svetlana Efremova and Daniel Stern. The fifth season saw Mireille Enos, Costa Ronin, Sean Kaufman, Ruby Cruz and Ines Asserson joining the main cast, with Kaufman, Cruz and Asserson taking over roles portrayed by child actors in the previous seasons.

The ensemble cast of Star City includes Rhys Ifans, Anna Maxwell Martin, Agnes O'Casey, Alice Englert, Solly McLeod, Adam Nagaitis, Ruby Ashbourne Serkis and Josef Davies, with Ifans, Casey, Englert and Davies portraying characters that were previously featured in For All Mankind.

The series features historical figures including Apollo 11 astronauts Neil Armstrong, Buzz Aldrin, and Michael Collins, Mercury Seven astronaut Deke Slayton, rocket scientist Wernher von Braun, NASA Administrator Thomas Paine, NASA flight director Gene Kranz, U.S. senator Ted Kennedy, and U.S. presidents Richard Nixon, Ronald Reagan and Bill Clinton with some of them portrayed by actors, while others appear through archival footage that is sometimes altered to reflect the changes in the alternate timeline.

The following is a list of characters that appeared on the television series.

== Cast ==
List indicators
= Main cast (credited)
= Recurring cast (3+)
= Guest cast (1–2)

=== Main cast ===
Character	Portrayed by	For All Mankind					Star City	Episode Count
Character	Portrayed by	Season 1	Season 2	Season 3	Season 4	Season 5	Star City	Episode Count
Edward Baldwin	Joel Kinnaman	Main	Main	Main	Main	Main		43
Gordo Stevens	Michael Dorman	Main	Main			Guest		21
Tracy Stevens	Sarah Jones	Main	Main					20
Karen Baldwin	Shantel VanSanten	Main	Main	Main	Guest (Note: Uncredited in season four.)	Guest		32
Ellen Wilson	Jodi Balfour	Main	Main	Main	Guest			29
Margo Madison	Wrenn Schmidt	Main (Note: In season five, Wrenn Schmidt is only credited with the main cast in the first three episodes and then as a guest in the tenth episode.)	Main	Main	Main	Main		43
Molly Cobb	Sonya Walger	Recurring	Main (Note: In season three, Sonya Walger is only credited with the main cast in the first two episodes and then as a guest star in the tenth episode.)	Main				17
Danielle Poole	Krys Marshall	Recurring	Main	Main	Main	Guest		36
Kelly Baldwin	Cynthy Wu		Main	Main	Main	Main		38
Danny Stevens	Casey W. Johnson (Note: In season one, a young Danny Stevens is portrayed by Jason David and Mason Thames. From season two onwards, Casey W. Johnson portrayed the character in all other appearances.)	Recurring	Main	Main	Guest			25
Aleida Rosales	Coral Peña (Note: In season one, a young Aleida Rosales is portrayed by Olivia Trujillo. From season two onwards, Coral Peña portrayed the character in all other appearances.)	Recurring	Main	Main	Main	Main		42
Dev Ayesa	Edi Gathegi			Main	Main	Main		26
Miles Dale	Toby Kebbell				Main	Main		20
Samantha Massey	Tyner Rushing				Main			10
Irina Morozova	Svetlana Efremova				Main	Recurring		21
Irina Morozova	Agnes O'Casey						Main	21
Eli Hobson	Daniel Stern				Main			10
Celia Boyd	Mireille Enos					Main		10
Leonid Polivanov	Costa Ronin					Main		10
Alex Poletov Baldwin	Sean Kaufman (Note: In season four, a young Alex Poletov is portrayed by Ezrah Lin. From season five onwards, Sean Kaufman portrayed the character in all other appearances.)				Recurring	Main		17
Lily Dale	Ruby Cruz (Note: In season four, a young Lily Dale is portrayed by Piper Rubio. From season five onwards, Ruby Cruz portrayed the character in all other appearances.)				Recurring	Main		14
Avery Jarrett	Ines Asserson (Note: A young Avery Jarrett (then Stevens) is portrayed by Delaney Claire Evans and Parker Reese Evans in season three and by Ellie Grace Pomeroy in season four. From season five onwards, Ines Asserson portrayed the character in all other appearances.)			Guest	Guest	Main		8
Sergei Korolev	Rhys Ifans (Note: In For All Mankind, Sergei Korolev is portrayed by Endre Hules.)		Guest				Main	10
Lyudmilla Raskova	Anna Maxwell Martin						Main	8
Anastasia Belikova	Alice Englert (Note: In For All Mankind, Anastasia Belikova is portrayed by Rita Khrabrovitsky.)	Guest					Main	9
Sasha Polivanov	Solly McLeod						Main	7
Valya Mironov	Adam Nagaitis						Main	7
Tanya Mironova	Ruby Ashbourne Serkis						Main	7
Sergei Nikulov	Josef Davies (Note: In For All Mankind, Sergei Nikulov is portrayed by Piotr Adamczyk.)		Recurring	Recurring	Guest		Main	21
Lakshmi Chadha	Priya Kansara						Main	4

=== Recurring cast ===
Character	Portrayed by	For All Mankind					Star City	Episode Count
Character	Portrayed by	Season 1	Season 2	Season 3	Season 4	Season 5	Star City	Episode Count
Deke Slayton	Chris Bauer	Recurring						9
Wernher von Braun	Colm Feore	Recurring						3
Gene Kranz	Eric Ladin	Recurring						6
Jack Broadstreet	Michael Harney	Recurring						5
Thomas O. Paine	Dan Donohue	Recurring	Recurring					12
Octavio Rosales	Arturo Del Puerto	Recurring		Recurring				9
Charlie Duke	Ben Begley	Recurring						3
Marge Slayton	Rebecca Wisocky	Recurring						4
Pam Horton	Meghan Leathers	Recurring	Recurring	Recurring	Guest (Note: Photograph only.)			17
Buzz Aldrin	Chris Agos	Recurring						6
Michael Collins	Ryan Kennedy	Recurring						3
Bill Strausser	Noah Harpster	Recurring	Recurring	Recurring	Guest			24
Tim McKiernan	Nick Toren	Recurring	Recurring					10
Hank Poppen	Daniel Robbins	Recurring						4
Frank Sedgewick	Dave Power	Recurring	Guest					5
Roger Scott	Spencer Garrett	Recurring	Guest					8
Shane Baldwin	Teddy Blum / Tait Blum	Recurring				Guest (Note: Uncredited.)		9
Jimmy Stevens	David Chandler (Note: In season one, a young Jimmy Stevens is portrayed by William Lee Holler and Zakary Risinger. From season two onwards, David Chandler portrayed the character in all other appearances.)	Recurring	Recurring	Recurring				16
Emma Jorgens	Teya Patt	Recurring	Recurring	Recurring				11
Cata	Krystal Torres	Recurring						4
Larry Wilson	Nate Corddry	Recurring	Recurring	Recurring				17
Arthur Weber	Dan Warner	Recurring						5
Wayne Cobb	Lenny Jacobson	Recurring	Recurring	Guest				8
Clayton Poole	Edwin Hodge	Recurring						3
Gloria Sedgewick	Tracy Mulholland	Recurring						4
Harold Weisner	Wallace Langham	Recurring						5
Irene Hendricks	Leonora Pitts	Recurring	Recurring					6
Gavin Donahue	James Urbaniak	Recurring						3
Andrea Walters	Megan Dodds	Recurring	Guest					6
Nelson Bradford	John Marshall Jones		Recurring	Guest				10
Gary Piscotty	Michael Benz		Recurring					7
Helena Webster	Michaela Conlin		Recurring					8
Steve Pomeranz	Tim Jo		Recurring					5
Paul Michaels	Charlie Schlatter		Recurring					7
Amy Chang	Linda Park		Recurring					5
Alex Rossi	Scott Michael Campbell		Recurring	Guest				6
Kouri	Kayla Blake		Recurring					3
Sally Ride	Ellen Wroe		Recurring					5
Paul DeWeese	Alex Akpobome		Recurring					3
Nick Corrado	Daniel David Stewart		Recurring	Recurring				8
Vance Paulson	Connor Tillman		Recurring					6
Charles Bernitz	Zac Titus		Recurring	Recurring				7
Jason Wilhelm	Andre Boyer		Recurring					5
Steve Lopez	Chris Cortez		Recurring					5
Sam Cleveland	Jeff Hephner		Recurring	Guest				4
Nathan Morrison	Josh Duvendeck		Recurring					3
Rolan Baranov	Alexander Sokovikov		Recurring	Recurring				10
Corey Johnson	Sean Patrick Thomas			Recurring	Recurring			6
Isaiah Johnson	Justice Pate			Recurring	Guest			5
Victor Diaz	Jorge Diaz			Recurring	Recurring	Guest		11
Amber Stevens	Madeline Bertani			Recurring	Guest			6
Nuri Prabakar	Sahana Srinivasan			Recurring	Guest			7
Grigory Kuznetsov	Lev Gorn			Recurring	Guest			10
Lenara Catiche	Vera Cherny			Recurring	Guest			9
Janice Haan	Patricia Mizen			Recurring				3
Karla Dunn	Hailey Winslow			Recurring				3
Edward Kline	Ken Rudulph			Recurring				6
Richard Truly	John Hartmann			Recurring				5
Javier Diaz	Santiago Veizaga (Note: In season three, a young Javier Diaz is portrayed by Tiago Martinez. From season four onwards, Santiago Veizaga portrayed the character in all other appearances.)			Recurring	Recurring			8
Jim Bragg	Randy Oglesby			Recurring		Recurring		9
Christine Francis	Jessica Tuck			Recurring	Recurring	Guest		14
Heather	Cheyenne Perez			Recurring				3
Ryan Bauer	Larry Sullivan			Recurring				4
Jenna Leigh	Allison Dunbar			Recurring				3
Will Tyler	Robert Bailey Jr.			Recurring	Recurring	Guest		14
Sunny Hall	Taylor Dearden			Recurring				3
Dick Gephardt	Stewart Skelton			Recurring				3
Alexei Poletov	Pawel Szajda			Recurring				5
Bill McGann	Larry Clarke			Recurring	Guest	Guest		7
Adarsh Sethi	Amol Shah			Recurring				5
Louisa Mueller	Anne Beyer			Recurring	Guest			8
Lars Hagstrom	Nick Boraine			Recurring				5
Sandy Bostik	Mandy Levin			Recurring				3
Benjamin Harmon	Ayinde Howell			Recurring				3
Hal Goodman	William Cowart			Recurring				3
Dimitri Mayakovsky	Goran Ivanovski		Guest	Recurring	Recurring	Recurring		19
Isabel Castillo	Ilza Ponko			Recurring				4
Richard Hilliard	Blair Hickey			Recurring	Guest			5
Lee Jung-Gil	C. S. Lee			Guest	Recurring	Recurring		15
Amanda Dale	Shannon Lucio				Recurring	Recurring		11
Svetlana Zakharova	Maria Mashkova				Recurring			3
Artem	Constantine Gregory				Recurring			3
Sarah Dale	Coco Day				Recurring			3
Graciana Diaz	Olivia Elena Aguilar (Note: In season four, a younger Graciana Diaz was portrayed by Paris Rose.)				Recurring	Recurring		7
Olga Poletova	Irina Dubova				Recurring			3
Jen Hughes	S. Zylan Brooks				Recurring			3
Tim	Alex Cioffi				Recurring			5
Ilya Breshov	Dimiter Marinov				Recurring	Recurring		13
Palmer James	Myk Watford				Recurring	Recurring		16
Joanna Chapman	Rhian Rees				Recurring			3
Gerardo Ortiz-Niño	Salvador Chacón				Recurring	Recurring		19
Rich Waters	Moses Jones				Recurring			8
Maya Estime	Jo Kelly				Recurring			5
Cho Byung Ho	Charles Kim				Recurring			4
Charlie Parfitt	Michael Lee Joplin				Recurring			3
Petros Khorenatsi	Nick Gracer				Recurring			3
Faiza Khatib	Noor Razooky				Recurring			4
Vera Martil	Danielle Nottingham				Recurring	Guest		4
Mike Bishop	Billy Lush				Recurring			4
Tatyana Volkova	Ania Bukstein				Recurring			3
Leonid	Emil Markov				Recurring	Guest		4
Luka Gurino	Sebastiano Pigazzi				Recurring			3
Geraldine Middaugh	Steph Evison Williams				Recurring			3
Timur Avilov	Nikita Bogolyubov				Recurring			3
Veronica Hunt	Tess Lina				Recurring	Recurring		9
Ravi Vaswani	Vinny Chhibber				Recurring			4
Holly Edmondson	Cindy Jackson				Recurring			4
Nate Lowry	Sean Patrick Murphy				Recurring			3
Nina Rozhenkova	Katarina Morhacova				Recurring			4
Seth Razack	Ely Henry				Recurring			3
Maximus Taylor	Elliott Ross				Recurring			3
Park Chui Moo	Mark Kwak				Recurring			3
Fred Stanislaus	Tyler Labine					Recurring		7
Marcus Haskell	Barrett Carnahan					Recurring		5
Dan Guerra	AJ Cedeño					Recurring		6
Silvio Costa	Jonathan Medina					Recurring		5
Nam Moon Yeong	Banyah Maria Choi (Note: In season four, Nam Moon Yeong is portrayed by Chen Chen Julian. From season five onwards, Banyah Maria Choi portrayed the character in all other appearances.)				Guest	Recurring		8
Gulsora Akilmatova	Yael Chanukov					Recurring		6
Fyodor Korzhenko	Dimitar Bakalov				Guest	Recurring		6
Sai Madoun	Faruk Amireh					Recurring		4
Malka Peretz	Roni Geva					Recurring		5
Zoey Chase	Thea Andrews				Guest	Recurring		6
Walt Griebel	Christopher Denham					Recurring		8
Shireen Al-Jabiri	Sara Boutine					Recurring		7
Vincente Spano	Samuel Dunning					Recurring		5
Louis Beaufort	Jean-Michel Richaud					Recurring		4
Gary Johnson	Chris Rickett					Recurring		3
Natalya Polivanova	Olga Fonda					Recurring		4
Stuart Fraser	Rueben Grundy					Recurring		5
Mahmoud Hesar	Max Deacon					Recurring		3
Kovacic	Nick Massouh					Recurring		4
Manuel Ruiz	Keith Miller					Recurring		3
Elena Beaufort	Kristina Klebe					Recurring		6
Oleg Vyshinsky	Michael Klesic					Recurring		5
Zuzana Khan	Arasha Lalani					Recurring		3
Auggie Kazlauskas	Sebastyan Meixger					Recurring		3
Raymond Dixon	Kameron J. Brown					Recurring		3
Zach Fleming	Jackie Kay					Recurring		4
Lucia Hernandez	Whitney Ortega					Recurring		3
Andrew Cedar	Kalama Epstein					Recurring		3
Fumiko	Masumi					Recurring		3
Tim	James Michael McHale					Recurring		3

== Main characters ==
=== Edward Baldwin ===
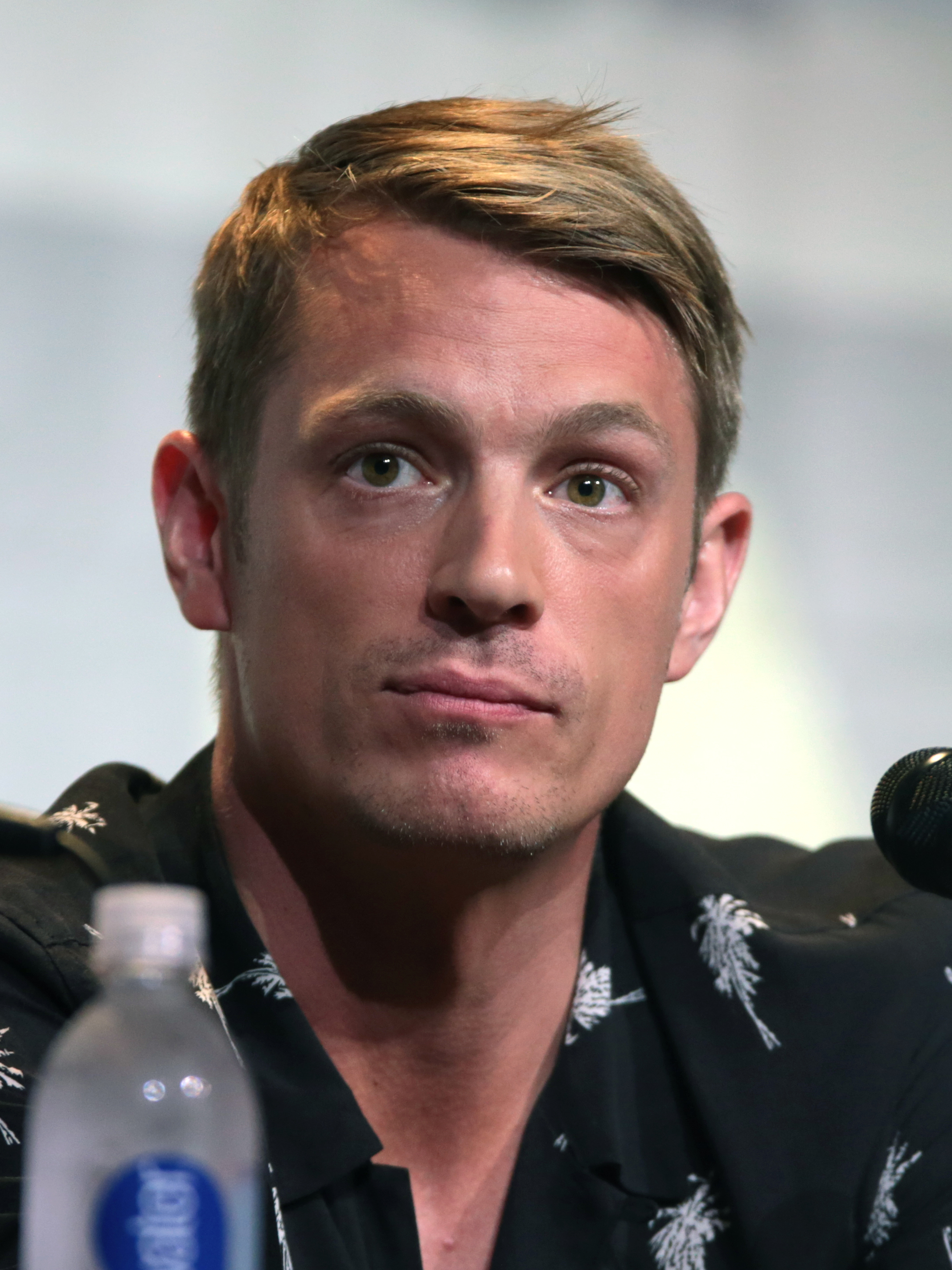
Joel Kinnaman

- Portrayed by Joel Kinnaman (seasons 1–5)

USN Rear Admiral Edward "Ed" Baldwin, an astronaut. A naval aviator, he flew F9F Panthers during the Korean War. He was the commander of Gemini 7, Apollo 10, Apollo 15, Apollo 22, Pathfinder and Phoenix. He was the husband of Karen Baldwin and raised two children with her, Shane and Kelly, with the latter being adopted from Vietnam in the 1970s.

During Apollo 10, which was intended as a test run for Apollo 11, Ed and Gordo Stevens, his best friend and fellow astronaut, were only eight miles away from the Moon, but were instructed by NASA not to land. After the Soviets then landed on the Moon before Apollo 11, Ed and Gordo were widely criticised by the media, but Ed deflected the blame onto NASA, claiming that "NASA doesn't have guts anymore". He was then removed from Apollo 15 as a consequence of the interview, but was later reinstated as commander by Deke Slayton. At the same time, he also worked as an instructor and trained "Nixon's Women", a program that was started in response to the Soviets landing cosmonaut Anastasia Belikova on the Moon. Alongside Gordo and Danielle Poole, Ed was on the Moon with Apollo 22 when Apollo 23 exploded on the launchpad, extending their stay on the Moon until Apollo 24 would be ready. Ed is eventually left alone on the Moon after Gordo and Danielle are forced to return to Earth due to a medical emergency; the Soviets had their base only a few miles away from Jamestown, forcing someone to remain at Jamestown. In the meantime, Ed's son Shane had died in a car accident, which NASA decided to keep secret from Ed as they feared the news would have a major impact on his mental state along with the isolation. However, the Soviets leaked the news to him, after which he shuts off all communication with Earth. Shortly after, one of the Soviet cosmonauts, Mikhail Vasiliev, arrived at Jamestown and asked to be let in, as he did not have enough oxygen to return to his own base. Ed decided to trust him and obliged, however in the 1980s it is revealed that Vasiliev had placed a listening device in Jamestown. Vasiliev convinced Ed to answer NASA's calls and later helped him to prepare for the arrival of Apollo 24. The mission was a success and Ed returned to Earth while Ellen Wilson takes over Jamestown.

By 1983, Ed had been promoted to rear admiral and worked as Chief of the Astronaut Office at NASA. He then assigned himself as the commander of the Pathfinder mission, which was meant to escort the Sea Dragon resupply mission to Jamestown. During the mission, an incident occurred on the Moon where two of the Soviet cosmonauts were shot by US "moon marines". The Soviet Union declared a blockade on the Moon and threatened to shoot down Sea Dragon if they did not abort their mission. Ed threatened to fire back and destroy Buran, the Soviet shuttle, but Sally Ride, one of his crew members, refused to activate the weapon systems. He relieved her of her duties and she pulled a gun on him to force him back, but he ignored her threats and told her that he knows she won't shoot him. Ed activated the weapon systems but reconsidered Sally's warning that there must be another solution. He then decided to shoot down Sea Dragon himself, as to prevent the Soviets from committing an action of war by letting them destroy an American shuttle.

In 1992, Ed left NASA after not being selected as commander of the Mars mission. Instead he joined Helios Aerospace, a private space company, to command their Mars mission. He decided to take Danny Stevens—Gordo's son—with him, despite Danielle warning him of Danny's instability. After reaching Mars, Ed and Danny attempted to land during a heavy dust storm. Being ahead of NASA's Sojourner–1, he now had the chance to become the first human on Mars, but after nearly hitting a mountain and looking at Danny beside him, he decided to abort the mission, unwilling to be responsible for Danny's death. His decision allowed Sojourner 1, led by Danielle, to land first. After a landslide destroyed most of Helios' equipment and killed multiple astronauts and cosmonauts, Helios, NASA, and Roscosmos banded together for a joint mission to return the survivors to Earth. Meanwhile, Ed's daughter Kelly had started an affair with cosmonaut Alexei Poletov, who died in the landslide, and got pregnant. After months of repairing their equipment, Kelly had to be brought on board the Phoenix, Helios' ship in the Mars orbit, as soon as possible to save the baby, but as they had not produced enough fuel yet, only Kelly alone could be sent to Phoenix. Ed and the remaining survivors decided to stay on Mars and wait for a rescue mission, while Kelly and the Phoenix flew back to Earth. Ed flew Kelly towards the Phoenix with the repaired Landing Module and then managed to crash-land the Module back on Mars.

Ed is based on Apollo 10 commander Thomas P. Stafford.

=== Gordo Stevens ===
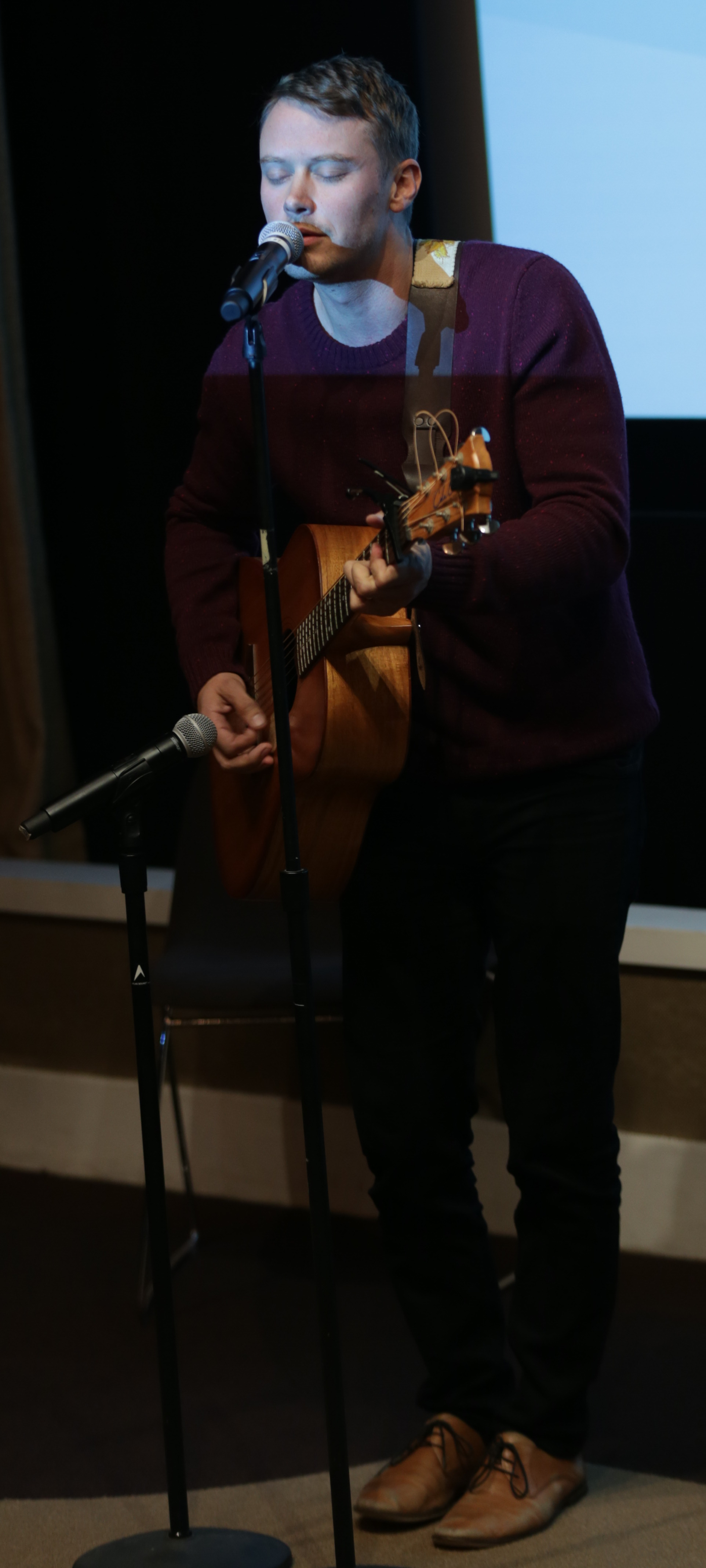
Michael Dorman

- Portrayed by Michael Dorman (seasons 1–2; guest season 5)

USN Captain Gordon "Gordo" Stevens, an astronaut. His first mission was as Pilot of Gemini 7 alongside Ed Baldwin. Later, he was the Lunar Module Pilot of Apollo 10, the commander of Apollo 18 and a member of the Apollo 22 crew, also known as Jamestown 2, the second mission that stayed at Jamestown Moon Base and was later stationed on the Base again with Jamestown 91. He was the husband of Tracy Stevens and had two sons with her, Danny and Jimmy.

Gordo flew with his best friend Baldwin for Apollo 10 and was criticised for not taking the opportunity to land on the Moon, which allowed the Soviets to come first. He was scheduled to fly with Ed again for Apollo 15, but was replaced by Molly Cobb and instated as commander of Apollo 18 again. Alongside Ed and also Danielle Poole, Gordo was on the Moon with Apollo 22, when the follow-up mission Apollo 23 exploded on the launchpad, extending their stay on the Moon until Apollo 24 would be ready. During their isolation Gordo suffered from extreme anxiety and hallucinations. The three first decided to keep his condition secret, as NASA would never allow him to fly again if they found out about his episodes of psychosis, but Ed decided to tell Houston the morning after another episode. In the same night, Danielle broke her own arm; the crew told NASA that it was an accident, and that Danielle had to fly back to Earth for medical treatment. Gordo accompanied her as pilot, sparing him from anyone finding out about his mental health problems, while Ed stayed on the Moon, as they could not leave Jamestown uncrewed. Back on Earth, he started seeing a psychologist and also told Tracy what really happened. Gordo later spoke to Danielle and told her that he wanted to reveal the truth to the whole world, that Danielle was the hero, not him, but Danielle told him that it would only ruin both their careers and to keep it secret.

By 1983, Gordo and Tracy had divorced and Gordo let himself go, believing that he would never fly again, but after seeing Ed and Danielle preparing for their missions, he pulled himself back and started working out with the goal to fly to the Moon again. He is eventually selected and returns to the Moon with Jamestown 91, where he also reunited with Tracy. When the Soviet cosmonauts attacked Jamestown to retrieve their captured comrade, Rolan Baranov, who had been shot and brought to Jamestown for medical treatment, Gordo and Tracy were in a chamber, talking about where their marriage went wrong, when they noticed that the inside of Jamestown was depressurized. Although the Soviets had blocked all communication to the Earth, the two managed to contact Houston via an older device from the original Jamestown Base. Margo Madison informed them that the reactor had been damaged and that there would be a nuclear meltdown soon if they did not activate the backup coolant systems. With no way to contact anyone else on Jamestown, the only way to prevent a meltdown was to activate the systems from outside. However, there were no spacesuits in their chamber, forcing Gordo and Tracy to make impromptu spacesuits from duct tape, which would only protect them for a few seconds. They ran outside, turned the systems on and managed to reenter the chamber, but succumbed to their wounds caused by vacuum exposure. They were later found by the remaining astronauts on Jamestown and are posthumously awarded the Medal of Honor and buried at the Arlington National Cemetery.

Gordo is partially based on Apollo 10's lunar module pilot Eugene Cernan and on Mercury Seven astronaut Gordo Cooper.

=== Tracy Stevens ===
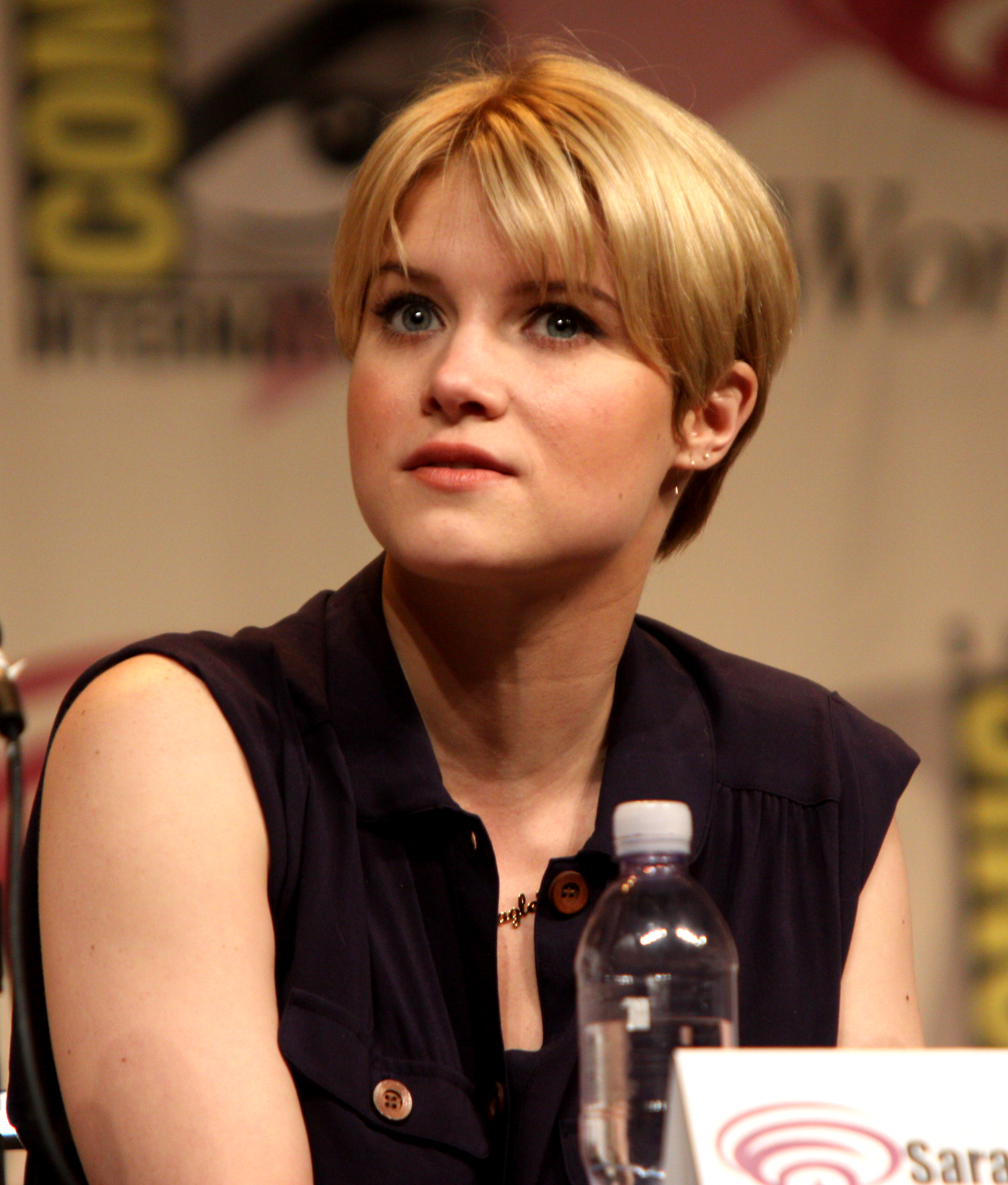
Sarah Jones

- Portrayed by Sarah Jones (seasons 1–2)

Tracy Stevens, an astronaut. She was the command module pilot of Apollo 25 and was later stationed on Jamestown Moon Base with Jamestown 89. She was the wife of Gordo Stevens and had two sons with him, Danny and Jimmy.

In 1970, Tracy became an astronaut candidate as one of "Nixon's Women", a program that was started in response to the Soviets landing cosmonaut Anastasia Belikova on the Moon. She was one of four out of twenty women selected for the final program. Following the explosion of Apollo 23, which led to Ed Baldwin being stranded on the Moon, Apollo 24 was sent a few months later to return Ed to Earth. However, Apollo 24 had a malfunction while being in orbit and needed a new Saturn V FCC to be repaired. Tracy had already been selected as pilot of Apollo 25, whose original mission was to repair an astronomical satellite in Earth's orbit but changed to help Apollo 24. During the repairs the S-IVB of Apollo 24 accidentally ignited and launched the capsule, killing astronaut Harrison Liu and dragging the still-tethered Apollo 25 with it. Molly Cobb, the commander of Apollo 25, managed to free their ship and was catapulted into space, but Tracy managed to pilot Apollo 25 to catch and save Molly, after which they returned safely to Earth.

By 1983, Gordo and Tracy had divorced and Tracy had remarried. She returned to the Moon with Jamestown 89, where she reunited with Gordo, who arrived a while later with Jamestown 91. When the Soviet cosmonauts attacked Jamestown to retrieve their captured comrade, Rolan Baranov, who had been shot and brought to Jamestown for medical treatment, Gordo and Tracy were in a chamber, talking about where their marriage went wrong, when they noticed that the inside of Jamestown was depressurized. Although the Soviets had blocked all communication to the Earth, the two managed to contact Houston via an older device from the original Jamestown Base. Margo informed them that the reactor had been damaged and that there would be a nuclear meltdown soon if they did not activate the backup coolant systems. With no way to contact anyone else on Jamestown, the only way to prevent a meltdown was to activate the systems from outside. However, there were no spacesuits in chamber, forcing Gordo and Tracy to make impromptu spacesuits from duct tape, which would only protect them for a few seconds. They ran outside, turned the systems on and managed to reenter the chamber, but succumbed to their wounds caused by vacuum exposure. They were later found by the remaining astronauts on Jamestown and are posthumously awarded the Medal of Honor and buried at the Arlington National Cemetery.

Tracy is partially based on Trudy Olsen Cooper, a licensed pilot and the former wife of Mercury Seven astronaut Gordon Cooper.

=== Karen Baldwin ===
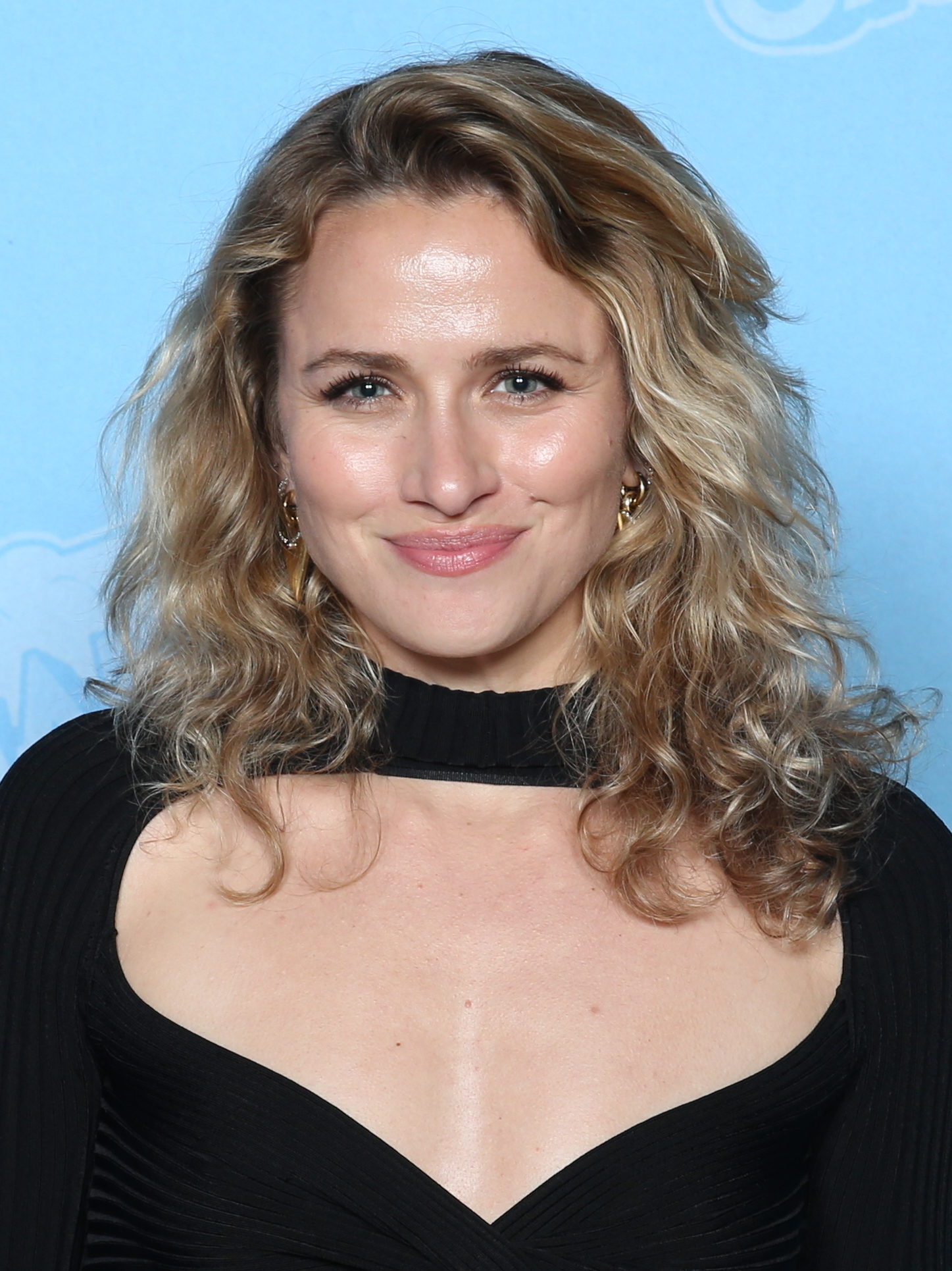
Shantel VanSanten

- Portrayed by Shantel VanSanten (seasons 1–3; guest seasons 4–5)

Karen Baldwin, Ed's wife with whom she had two children, Shane and Kelly, with the latter being adopted from Vietnam in the 1970s.

In the 1970s, Karen often took care of Tracy's and Gordo's two sons Danny and Jimmy after Tracy followed her husband into the astronaut program. At the same time, she also developed a friendship with Wayne Cobb, the husband of Tracy's fellow astronaut Molly Cobb, bonding over being the partners of astronauts. After Shane's death in a car accident in 1974, she decided not to tell Ed about Shane's death while he is still on the Moon, as NASA feared the effects the message would have on his mental state along with the isolation that he already had to endure. However, the Soviets leaked the news to him, after which he shut off all communications with Earth. The two eventually reunited after Ed's return to Earth to grieve together.

By the 1980s, Karen had become the owner of the Outpost Tavern, a bar usually visited by NASA astronauts, after previously having worked there. When their daughter Kelly, whom they adopted a few years after Shane's death, told them that she wanted to go the United States Naval Academy in Annapolis, Karen and Ed were opposed to the idea, which resulted in a family fight. Frustrated with her family life, she developed a damaging and predatory sexual relationship with Danny Stevens, who she helped raise as a child and was working at The Outpost at the time. She told Ed about her infidelity right before he had to leave on another mission to the Moon, though she did not tell him that it was Danny. She later sold the Outpost to Sam Cleveland, Tracy's second husband, who wanted to turn it into a franchise.

Together with Sam Cleveland, she then founded Polaris Space Tours, a space tourism company. In 1992, they opened the Polaris space hotel with the wedding of Danny and Amber Stevens. However, the space station was hit by space debris and nearly destroyed. Following Sam's death during the Polaris hotel disaster, the company was dissolved and the space station was bought by Dev Ayesa, who wanted to rebuild the hotel into a spaceship for his Mars mission. Karen then joined his company, Helios Aerospace, to help him recruit astronauts and engineers from NASA, including her then ex-husband Ed. Following multiple incidents during the Mars race between Helios, NASA and the Soviet Union, the three factions band together for a joint mission. In the meantime, Jimmy Stevens became involved with a group of conspiracy theorists and anti-NASA activists, who planned a bombing of the Johnson Space Center. When Jimmy realized the truth about what he thought would just be a protest, he attempted to call his sister-in-law Amber but is knocked out and tied up by one of the conspirators. After Amber heard Jimmy's voice message and failed to call him back, she told Karen instead. Karen started searching for Jimmy and found him tied up in a van filled with explosives. Karen quickly confronted a security guard to inform him of the bomb and start an evacuation, but the bomb detonated before Karen could escape. After the explosion, Jimmy found her buried beneath debris, but she died before help arrived.

=== Ellen Wilson ===
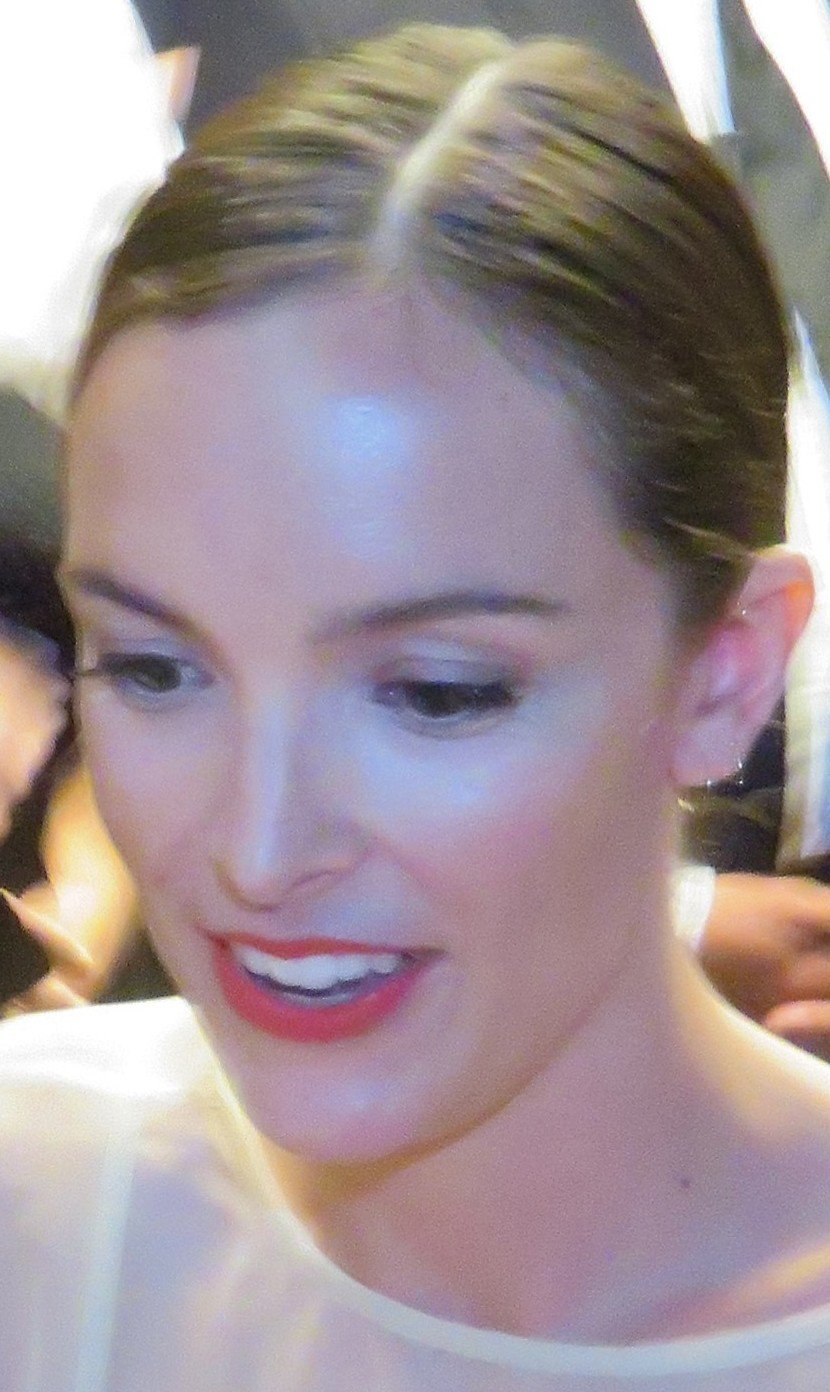
Jodi Balfour

- Portrayed by Jodi Balfour (seasons 1–3; guest season 4)

President Ellen Wilson (née Waverly), an astronaut and the 41st president of the United States. She was a member of the Apollo 19 crew and commanded Apollo 24 as well as Jamestown Moon Base.

In 1970, Ellen became an astronaut candidate as one of "Nixon's Women", a program that was started in response to the Soviets landing cosmonaut Anastasia Belikova on the Moon. She was one of four out of twenty women selected for the final program. She is a closeted lesbian and entered a relationship with Pam Horton, a bartender who worked at the Outpost Tavern. Following the Apollo 23 incident, NASA is investigated by the FBI. When Ellen's friend Larry Wilson, a NASA engineer who is also a closeted gay, becomes a suspect, the two married to give each other cover, which however causes Pam to break up with her. Following the explosion of Apollo 23, which led to Ed Baldwin being stranded on the Moon, Apollo 24 is sent a few months later to return Ed to Earth. However, Apollo 24 had a malfunction while being in orbit and needed a new Saturn V FCC to be repaired. Following the deaths of Deke Slayton and Harrison Liu, Ellen was the only Apollo 24 crew member to arrive at the Moon, also leaving her stranded for a while, after Ed was sent back, whom she replaced. Shortly before Deke's death, she told him about her sexuality. He was initially disgusted, but then became more sympathetic, advising her to not reveal her secret to anyone since the world had too many people who thought like him and that it could ruin her career, but that he believes she has great things ahead of her.

In 1983, she was the commander of Jamestown Moon Base before returning to Earth. She briefly took over as the Administrator of NASA, following the sudden death of Thomas O. Paine in 1983. At the same time she reunited with Pam, hoping to rekindle their relationship, but she is rejected by Pam due to her fear that they could not have a calm relationship together, as Ellen has become a public figure.

Ellen started her political career in 1986, when she won a seat in the United States Senate for Texas. In 1992, Ellen and Larry have a son called Scotty. In 1993, she became the first female president of the United States after winning the 1992 United States presidential election against Bill Clinton. When American astronaut Will Tyler, a member of NASA's Mars mission, came out as gay, Ellen issued an executive order so that no American military personnel should be forced to disclose their sexual orientation. While Larry was investigated for having an affair with a man in 1995, Ellen forestalled the outcome by publicly coming out as a lesbian. Shortly after, she once again reunited with Pam.

She was re-elected as president in the 1996 United States presidential election. During her second presidency, she formed the Mars–7 Alliance to oversee the Mars colony and further events at space exploration and legalized same-sex marriage. In 2001, Ellen and Pam got married.

=== Margo Madison ===
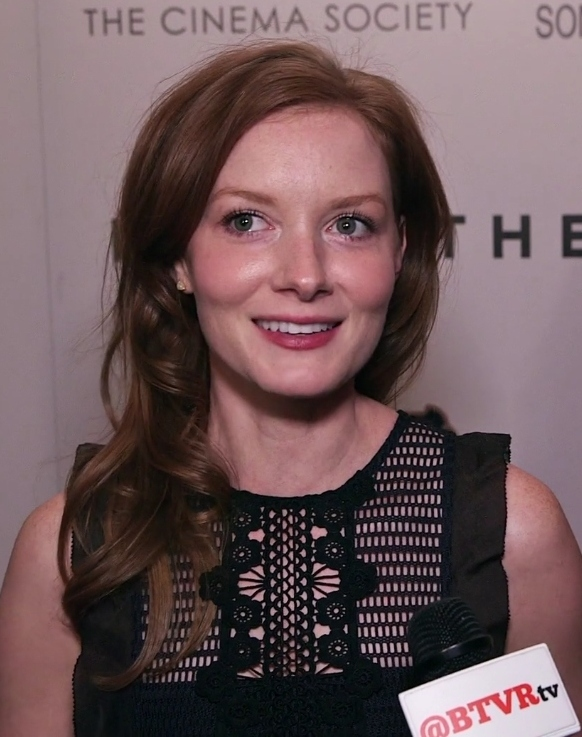
Wrenn Schmidt

- Portrayed by Wrenn Schmidt (seasons 1–5)

Margo Madison, a NASA engineer and the first woman in Mission Control, who was mentored by Wernher von Braun. She later became Flight Director and Director of the Johnson Space Center and also mentored Aleida Rosales, who she convinced to join NASA to work in Mission control. She developed an affair with Soviet engineer Sergei Nikulov during the joint Apollo–Soyuz mission. The two regularly exchanged information in secret over the years to help each other. In 1992, the Soviet Union then used their relationship to blackmail her into giving them the plans for NASA's Mars mission, which they used to improve their own spacecraft and compete in the race for Mars. After the FBI starts investigating against her, she accepts an offer from Lenara Catiche, the director of Roscosmos, to flee from the United States to the Soviet Union, where she lives under the alias Margaret Reynolds.

Margo is based on Frances Northcutt, who, during the Apollo 8 mission, became the first female engineer to work in NASA's Mission Control. The character Margo was also inspired by Margaret Hamilton, who led the development of the on-board flight software for the Apollo Guidance Computer of the Apollo program.

=== Molly Cobb ===
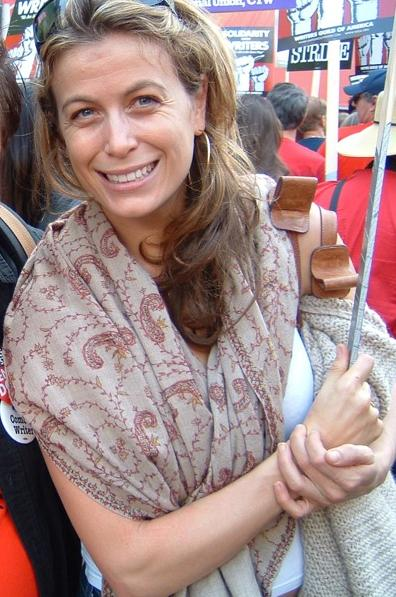
Sonya Walger

- Portrayed by Sonya Walger (seasons 2–3; recurring season 1)

Molly Cobb, an astronaut, former Mercury 13 pilot and member of "Nixon's Women". As module pilot of Apollo 15, she became the first American woman in space. She also commanded Apollo 21 and 25, the earlier also known as Jamestown 1, the first crew to permanently occupy the Moon, where she is the one who discovers ice in the Shackleton Crater. She retired as an astronaut after saving Wubbo Ockels during a solar storm which made it likely for her to develop cancer due to the radiation. She later developed normal tension glaucoma, which led to her becoming blind. Nonetheless, she served as Chief of the Astronaut Office until she was fired by Margo Madison in 1992. She is later present during the bombing of the Johnson Space Center and survives the initial explosion, but reenters the destroyed building to help others who were injured. The Space Center was then renamed after her to honour her for her sacrifice.

Molly is based on Jerrie Cobb.

=== Danielle Poole ===
- Portrayed by Krys Marshall (seasons 2–4; recurring season 1; guest season 5)

Danielle Poole, an astronaut and member of "Nixon's Women". She was a member of the Apollo 18 and 22 crews, which made her the first African American astronaut of NASA. She later commanded Apollo 75, which was part of the joint Apollo–Soyuz mission between NASA and the Soviet space program with the goal to bring NASA astronauts and Soviet cosmonauts together and shake hands, to encourage peace between the two nations during the height of the Cold War. While being in space, the mission was cancelled due to the high tensions between the two countries and Apollo 75 was called home, however she chose to ignore the command and contacted Soyuz–2 commander Stepan Petrovich Alexseev. They decided to manually proceed with the docking maneuver. After successfully docking, Danielle and Stepan met to shake hands, which ultimately helped to defuse the tensions between the two countries. In 1992, she was selected as commander of NASA's Mars mission, Sojourner–1. In 2003, she came out of retirement to become the new commander of the Happy Valley Mars base following the dismissal of Colonel George Peters after the failed Kronos mission.

=== Kelly Baldwin ===
- Portrayed by Cynthy Wu (seasons 2–5)

Kelly Ann Baldwin (née Nguyễn Thị Hạnh, before adoption), a biologist and Ed's and Karen's adoptive daughter from Vietnam. As a child she was boarded on an American C-5A Galaxy transport aircraft as part of Operation Babylift to bring her and other children to the United States as refugees. She was one of 47 children who survived the plane crash. The Baldwins then adopted her, after their son Shane had died in a car accident in 1974. In 1992, she worked at the McMurdo Station in Antarctica, before joining the crew of Danielle Poole's Mars mission. After the Sojourner saved the cosmonauts of Mars–94 and it became a joint mission, she entered an affair with cosmonaut Alexei Poletov. Following Alexei's death during the mission, she later gave birth to their child.

=== Danny Stevens ===
- Portrayed by Jason David (Note: As a child.) (recurring season 1), Mason Thames (Note: As a teenager.) (recurring season 1) and Casey W. Johnson (Note: As an adult.) (seasons 2–3; guest season 4)

Daniel Gordon "Danny" Stevens, an astronaut and Gordo's and Tracy's son. He slept with Karen Baldwin while working at the Outpost Tavern and struggled to overcome his feelings for her, even after marrying Amber Stevens. He was stationed on Jamestown Moon Base and later became a hero, when he saved the Polaris space hotel from destruction and saved the lives of everyone in the hotel following his wedding to Amber Stevens on the space station. In 1992, he joined Ed Baldwin's Mars mission sponsored by Helios Aerospace. While on Mars, he is injured during drilling and is given Vicodin, after which he begins stealing stronger pain meds and develops an addiction. After Ed confronts him about his addiction, Danny grows resentful and, due to guilt, causes a drilling accident which leads to a landslide that kills several astronauts. Once he reveals his role in the disaster, Danny is exiled to the North Korean landing module. He is mentioned to have committed suicide on Mars sometime before 2003.

=== Aleida Rosales ===
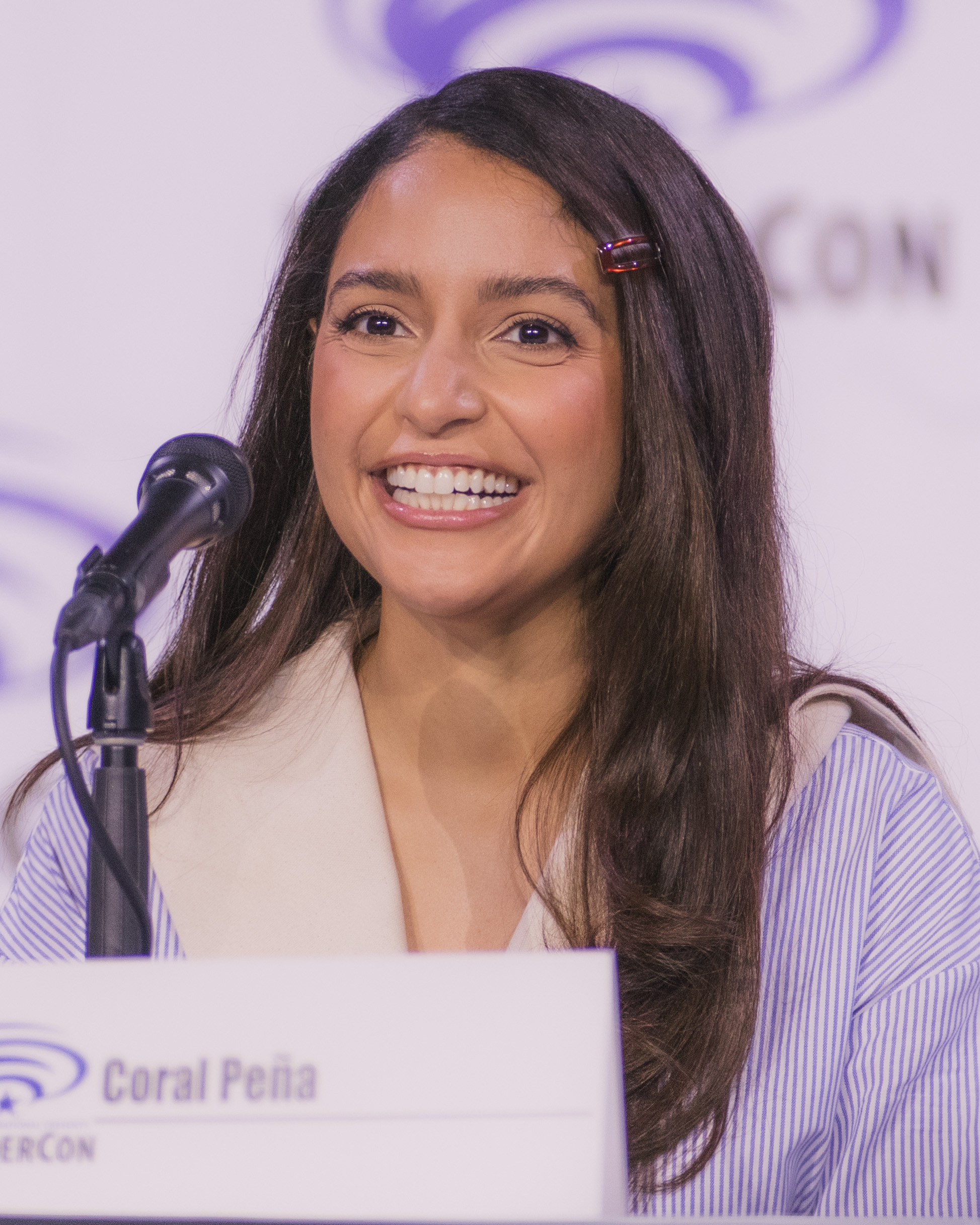
Coral Peña

- Portrayed by Olivia Trujillo (recurring season 1) and Coral Peña (season 2–present)

Aleida Rosales, the daughter of an illegal immigrant who is fascinated by space and was later mentored by Margo. Her father Octavio settled with her in Houston after the death of her mother. He worked as a janitor for NASA to help satisfy her interest in space. After her father is deported to Mexico after being initially suspected of spying for the Soviet Union, she was homeless from many years. She joined NASA as an engineer primarily to maintain her residency status, where she clashed with other employees due to her stubbornness, notably with Bill Strausser, a veteran mission controller, who temporarily quit his job after she called him "Peanut" in reference to an embarrassing episode in his past. Margo then forced her to apologize to Bill, after which he returned to NASA and the two became friends. By 1992, she was married to Victor Diaz, had a son, Javier, and was reunited with her father. The couple later also had a daughter, Graciana. Her father however showed signs of dementia, which she was unwilling to acknowledge. By 1994, she became Flight Director and directed NASA's Mars mission, Sojourner–1. She finds out about Margo's connection to the Soviets, which leads to the FBI starting an investigation despite her personal objections. After surviving the bombing of the Johnson Space Center by anti-NASA conspiracy theorists, she suffered severe post-traumatic stress disorder, causing her to take several months' leave of absence before resigning. She eventually partnered up with Kelly Baldwin to pursue private funding for a delayed NASA project, which led to the restoration of Dev Ayesa as CEO of Helios Aerospace.

=== Dev Ayesa ===
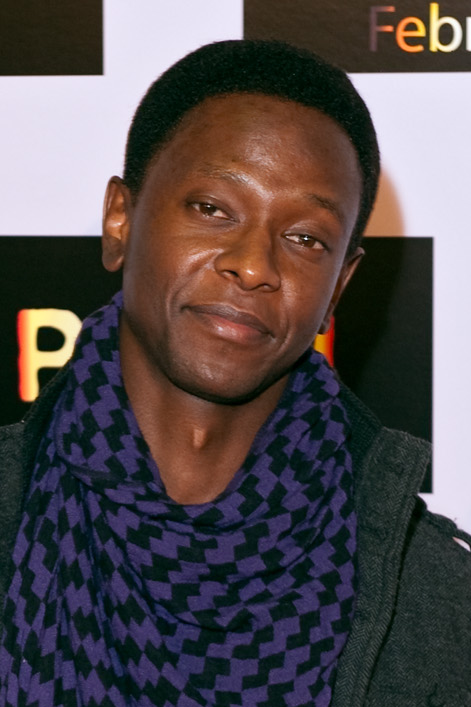
Edi Gathegi

- Portrayed by Edi Gathegi (season 3–present)

Dev Ayesa, the co-founder of "Helios Aerospace", a private space company with the goal to reach Mars before the NASA and the Soviet Union, for which he recruited Ed and Karen Baldwin and Danny Stevens. In 1987, Helios won a contract with NASA to mine Helium-3 from the lunar surface. The availability of clean nuclear energy led to an apparent curb in global warming. This breakthrough helped him fund the Phoenix, the space shuttle of his Mars mission, which was rebuilt from the Polaris space hotel after he bought the company from Karen Baldwin. He inherited his interest in space from his father, who worked as an engineer, building the Saturn V, but was fired following the explosion of Apollo 23.

=== Miles Dale ===
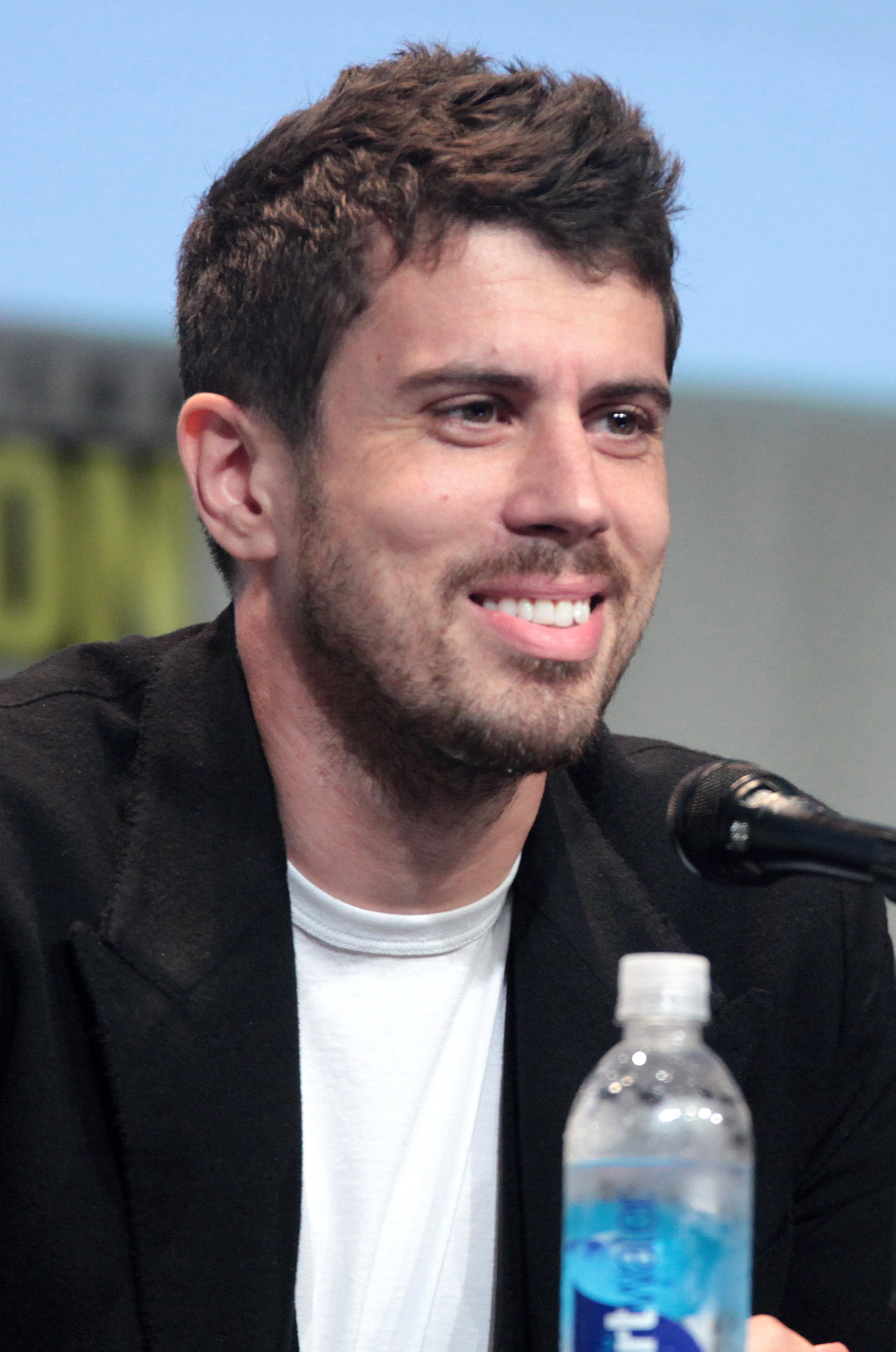
Toby Kebbell

- Portrayed by Toby Kebbell (season 4–present)

Miles Dale, a former offshore oil platform worker who pursues a new job opportunity on Mars.

=== Samantha Massey ===
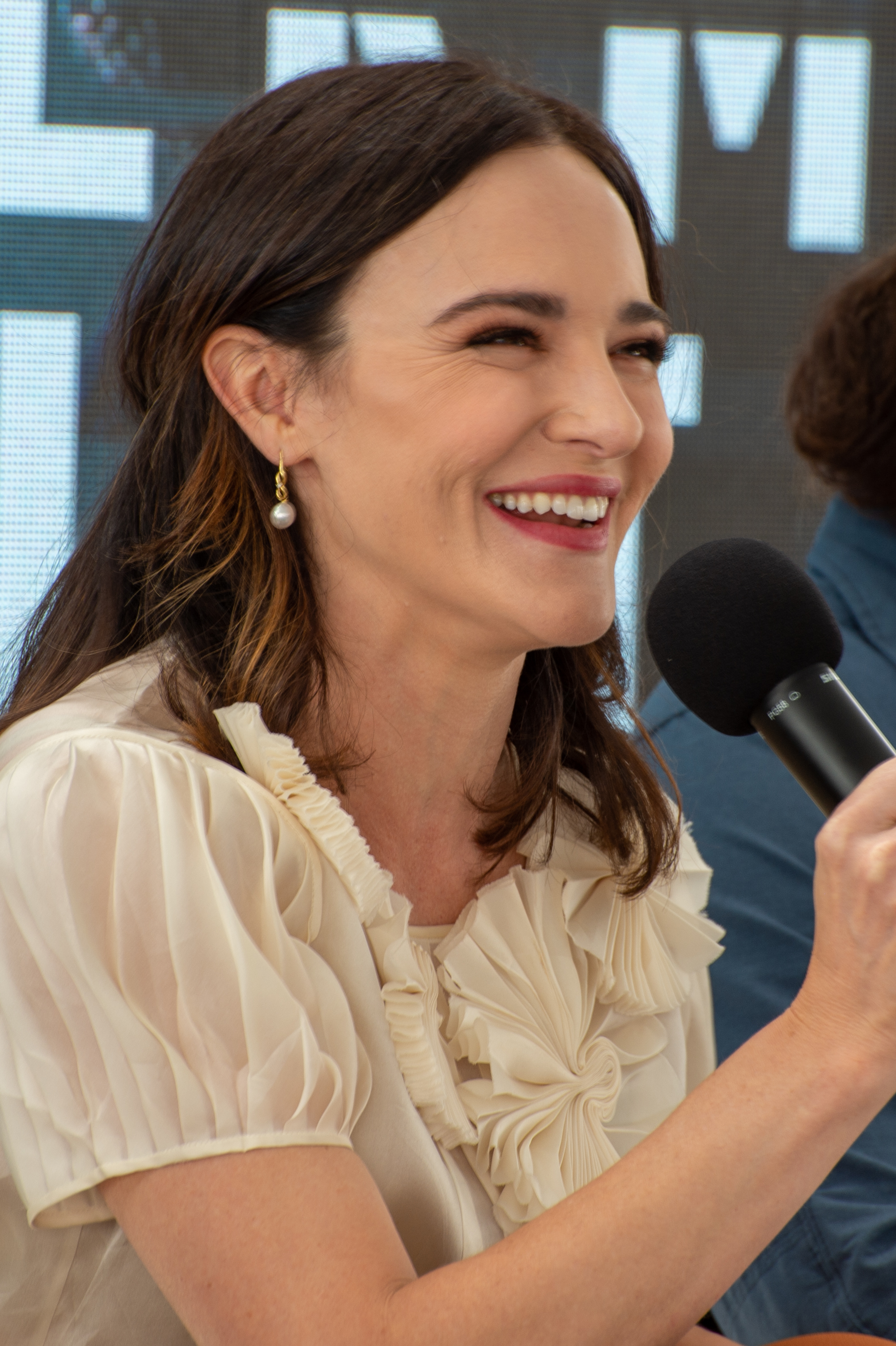
Tyner Rushing

- Portrayed by Tyner Rushing (season 4)

Samantha Massey, a space worker and astronaut on the Mars colony, who shares quarters with Miles Dale.

=== Irina Morozova ===
- Portrayed by Svetlana Efremova (season 4; recurring season 5) and Agnes O’Casey (Star City)

Irina Vasilievna Morozova, a high-ranking Soviet official with strong ties to the KGB.

=== Eli Hobson ===
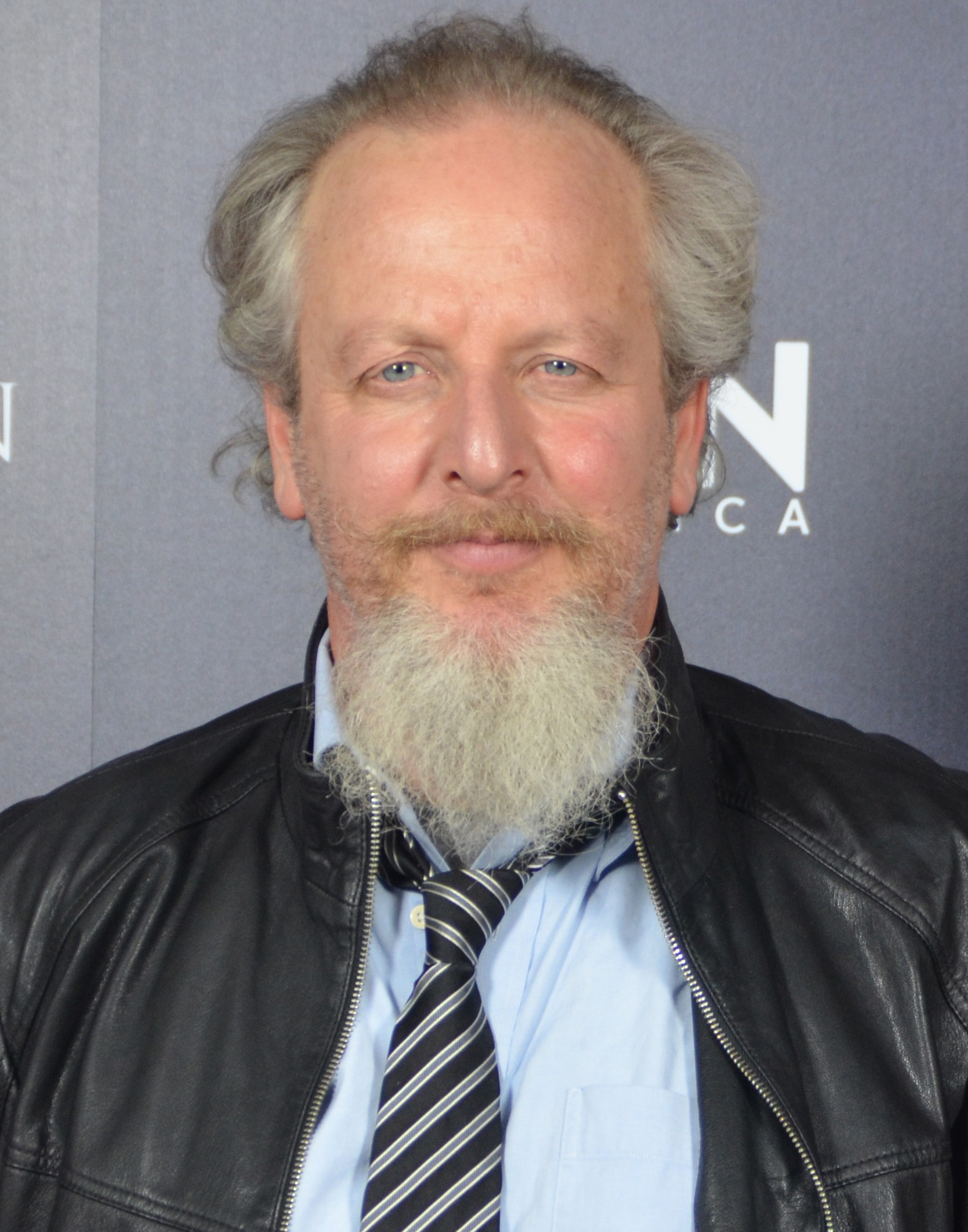
Daniel Stern

- Portrayed by Daniel Stern (season 4)

Eli Hobson, the new administrator of NASA. A former auto industry CEO, he's been tasked with bringing the agency into the 21st century by President Al Gore.

=== Celia Boyd ===
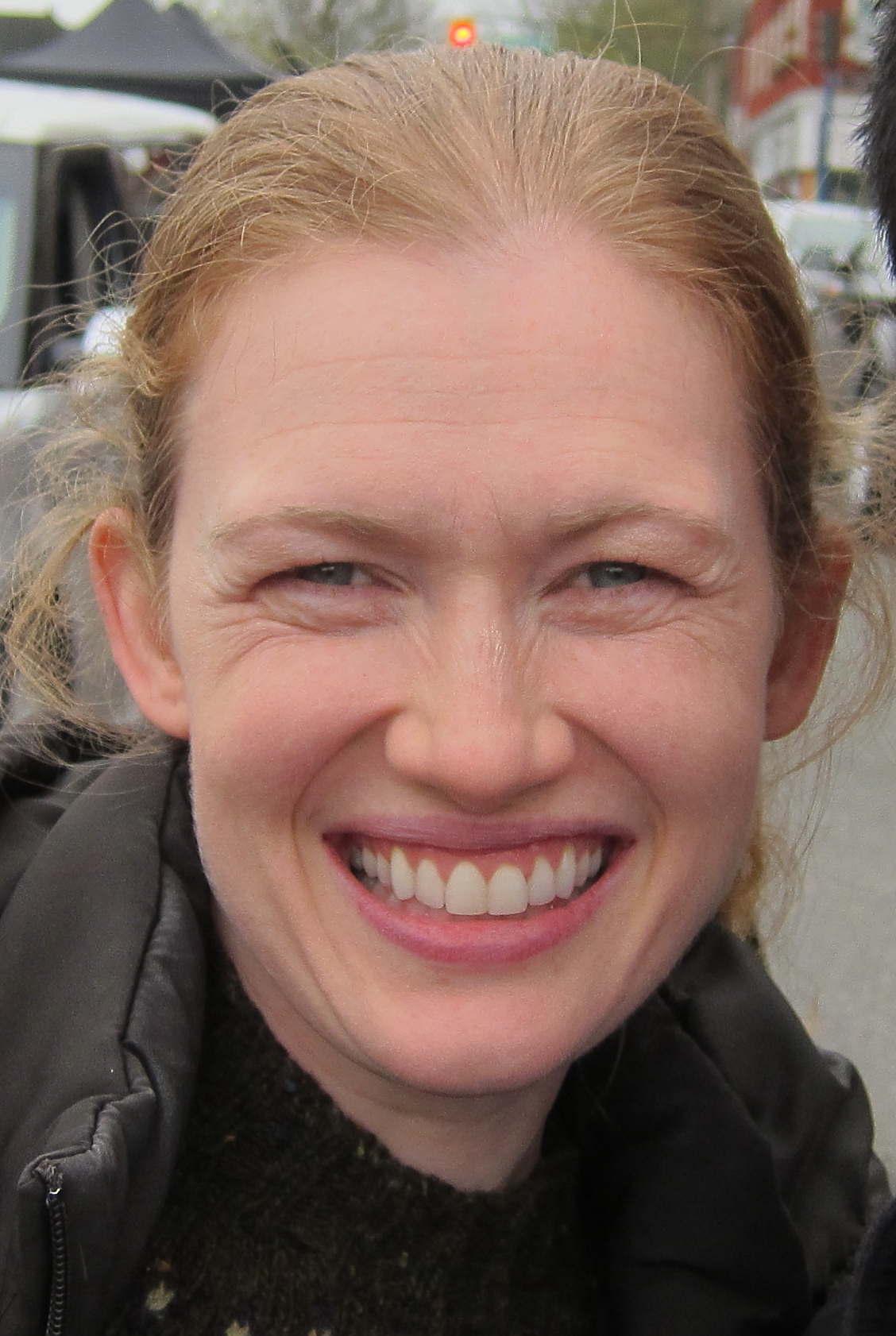
Mireille Enos

- Portrayed by Mireille Enos (season 5)

Celia Boyd, a member of the Peacekeeper Security Force on Mars.

=== Leonid Polivanov ===
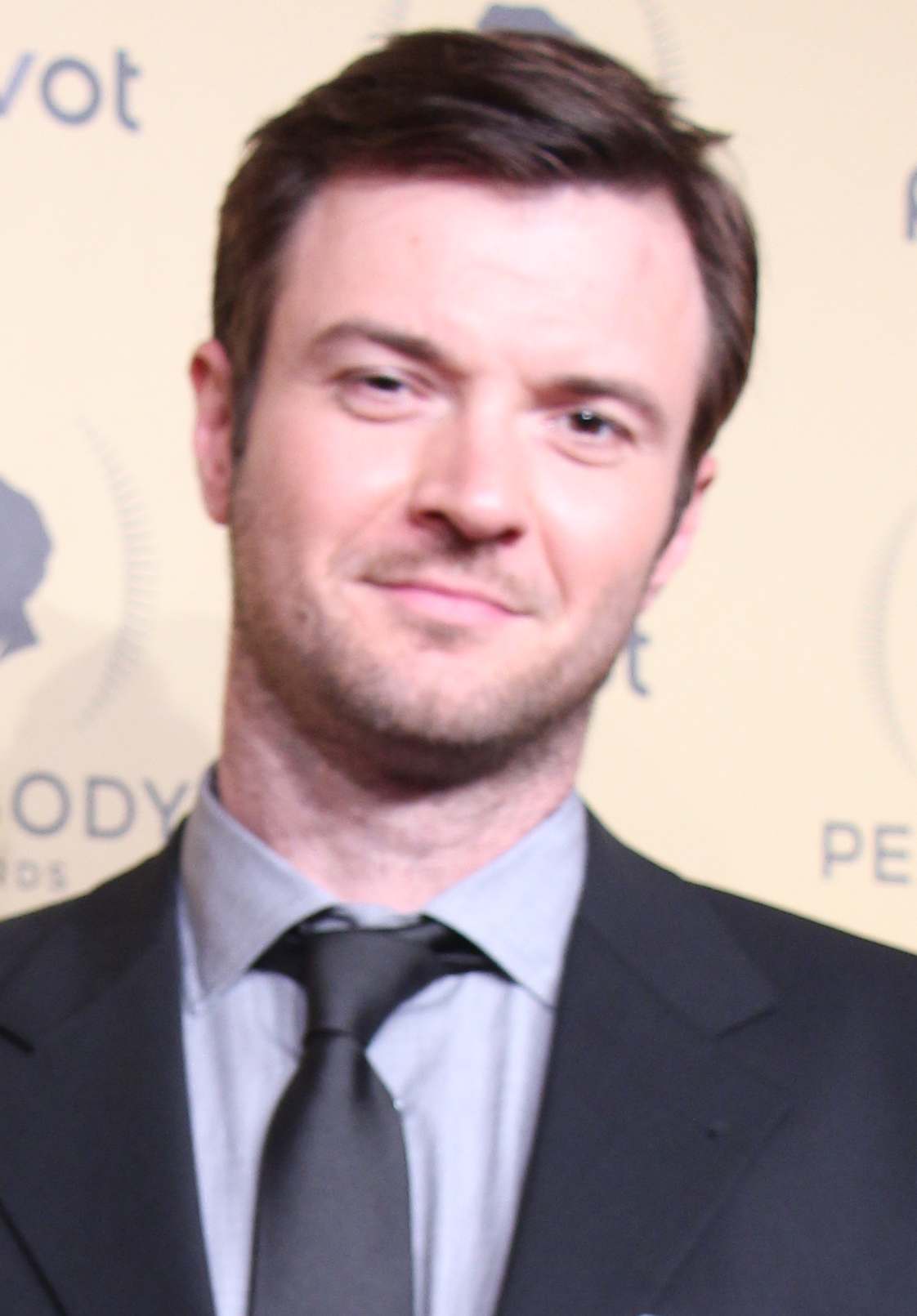
Costa Ronin

- Portrayed by Costa Ronin (season 5)

Leonid "Lenya" Polivanov, a Soviet politician and former cosmonaut, who serves as Governor of the Happy Valley Mars base in 2012.

=== Alex Poletov Baldwin ===
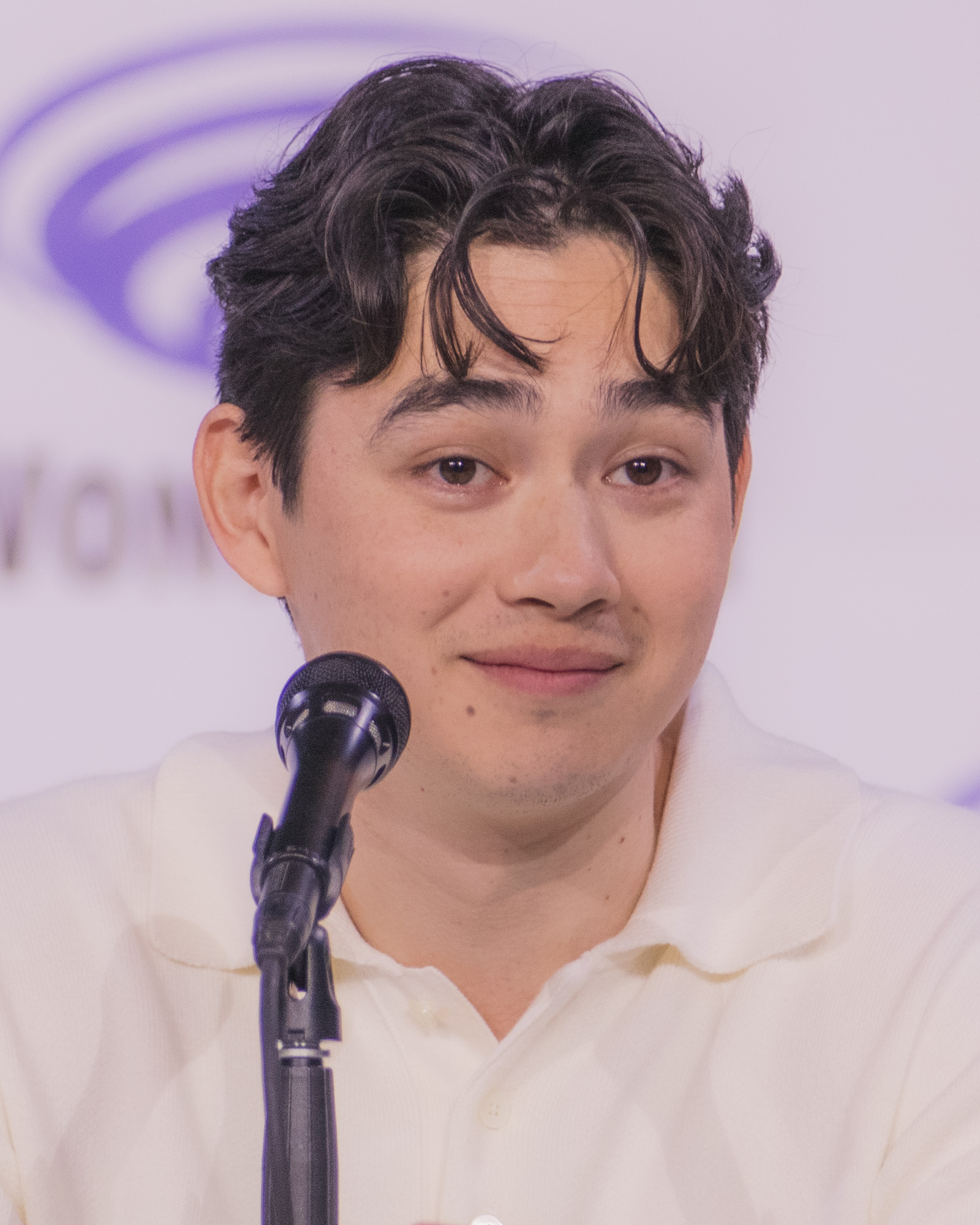
Sean Kaufman

- Portrayed by Ezrah Lin (recurring season 4) and Sean Kaufman (season 5)

Alex Poletov Baldwin, Kelly's and Alexei's son, the first human born on Mars.

=== Lily Dale ===
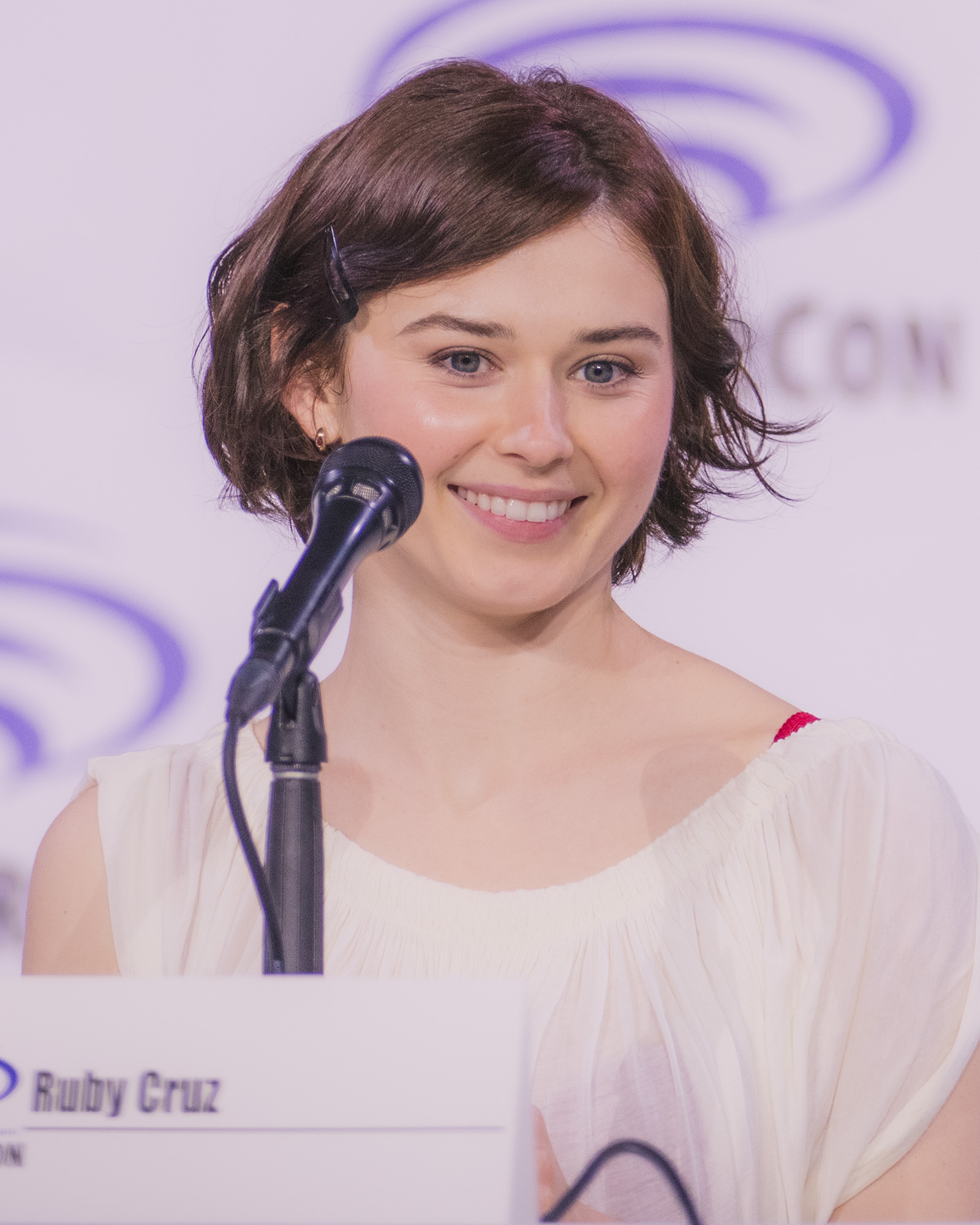
Ruby Cruz

- Portrayed by Piper Rubio (recurring season 4) and Ruby Cruz (season 5)

Lily Dale, Miles' and Amanda's younger daughter.

=== Avery Jarrett ===
- Portrayed by Delaney Claire Evans (Note: As an infant.) (guest season 3), Parker Reese Evans (guest season 3), Ellie Grace Pomeroy (guest season 4) and Ines Asserson (season 5)

Avery "A.J." Jarrett (née Stevens), Danny's and Amber's daughter. When her mother remarried following Danny's death, she took on her stepfather's last name. In 2012, she joined the US Marines and applied for the Off-Planet Expeditionary Force.

=== Sergei Korolev ===
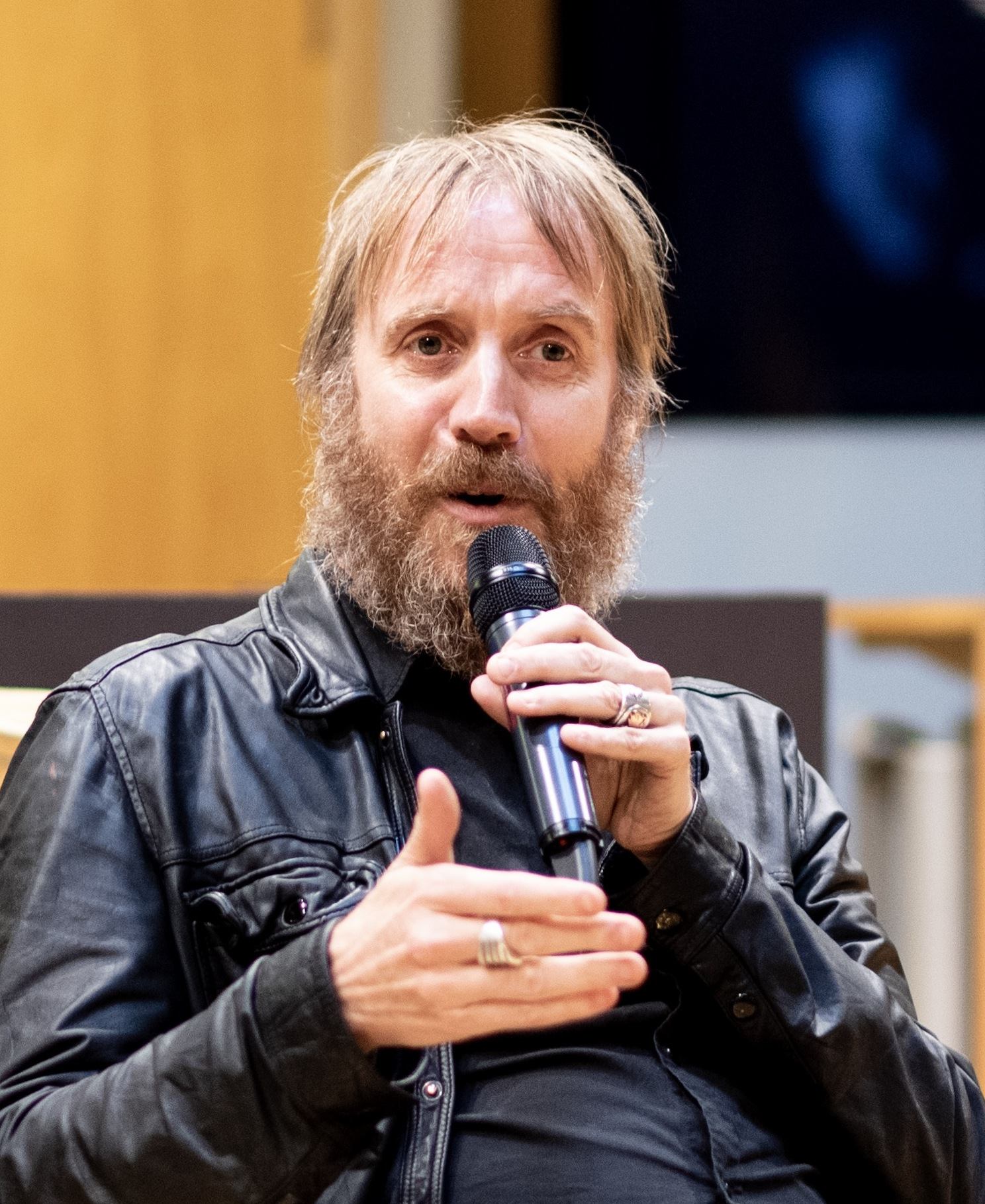
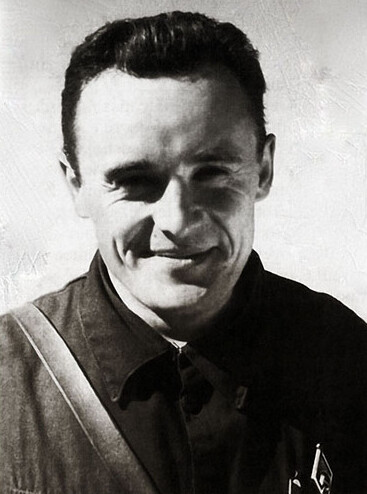
Rhys Ifans portrays Sergei Korolev, the head aerospace engineer of the Soviet Space Program whose death in 1966 becomes the divergence point of the show as he survives in the shows alternate timeline.
- Portrayed by Endre Hules (guest season 2) and Rhys Ifans (Star City)

Sergei Korolev, referred to as the Chief Designer, the driving force behind the Soviet Space program, who led the Soviet Union to the Moon before the United States. He later also worked on the joint Apollo–Soyuz mission. According to Ronald D. Moore, the creator of the show, the divergence point of the alternate timeline was that Korolev did not die during a surgery in 1966. His survival and further works led to the Soviets landing on the Moon first.

=== Lyudmilla Raskova ===
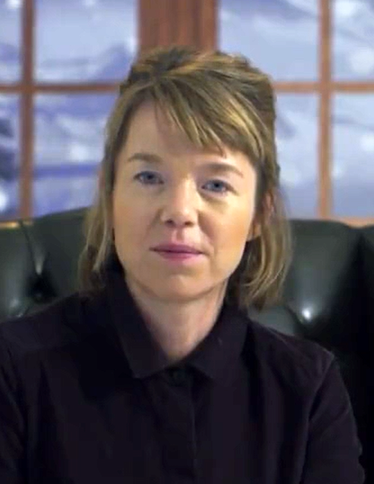
Anna Maxwell Martin

- Portrayed by Anna Maxwell Martin (Star City)

Lyudmilla Raskova, the head of the KGB surveillance department at Star City.

=== Anastasia Belikova ===
- Portrayed by Rita Khrabrovitsky (guest season 1) and Alice Englert (Star City)

Anastasia Belikova, an untested female cosmonaut in the Soviet Space program who later became the first woman on the Moon.

=== Sasha Polivanov ===
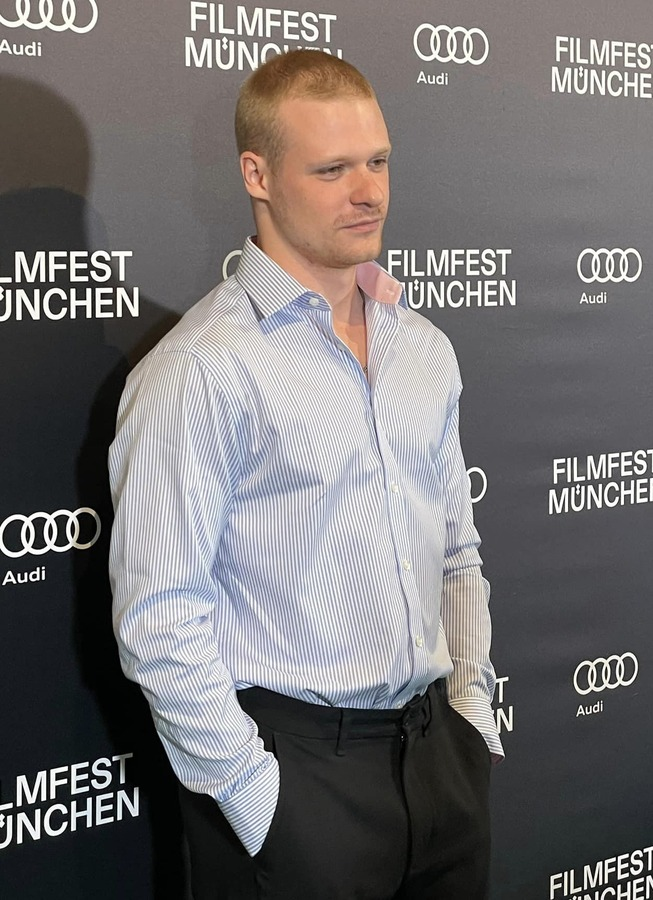
Solly McLeod

- Portrayed by Solly McLeod (Star City)

Sasha Polivanov, a reckless cosmonaut who has yet to live up to his potential.

=== Valya Mironov ===
- Portrayed by Adam Nagaitis (Star City)

Valya Mironov, a highly respected cosmonaut within the Soviet Space program.

=== Tanya Mironova ===
- Portrayed by Ruby Ashbourne Serkis (Star City)

Tanya Mironova, a cosmonaut’s wife that struggles within the confined world of Star City.

=== Sergei Nikulov ===
- Portrayed by Piotr Adamczyk (recurring seasons 2–3; guest season 4) and Josef Davies (Star City)

Sergei Orestovich Nikulov, a young, brilliant engineer who works at Soviet Ground Control, who works on the Apollo–Soyuz team and later the director of Roscosmos, who develops an affair with Margo Madison. The two regularly exchanged information in secret over the years to help each other, which his superiors controlled. After they found out that he gave Margo more information than they allowed him, he was imprisoned until Margo forced them to bring him to the U.S. for their joined Mars mission, after the Soviet shuttle malfunctioned and their cosmonauts were saved by NASA's Sojourner–1. In 1995, Sergei and his parents are given political asylum in the United States, where he lived under the alias Sergei Bezukhov and worked as a high school teacher until Margo's return to the United States in 2003, when he contacted her again to warn her about Irina Morozova, who then orchestrated his assassination, which was framed as a suicide.

=== Lakshmi Chadha ===
- Portrayed by Priya Kansara (Star City)

Lakshmi Chadha, a gifted life-support system scientist and engineer from India who was invited to work at Star City.

== Recurring characters ==
=== Introduced in season one ===
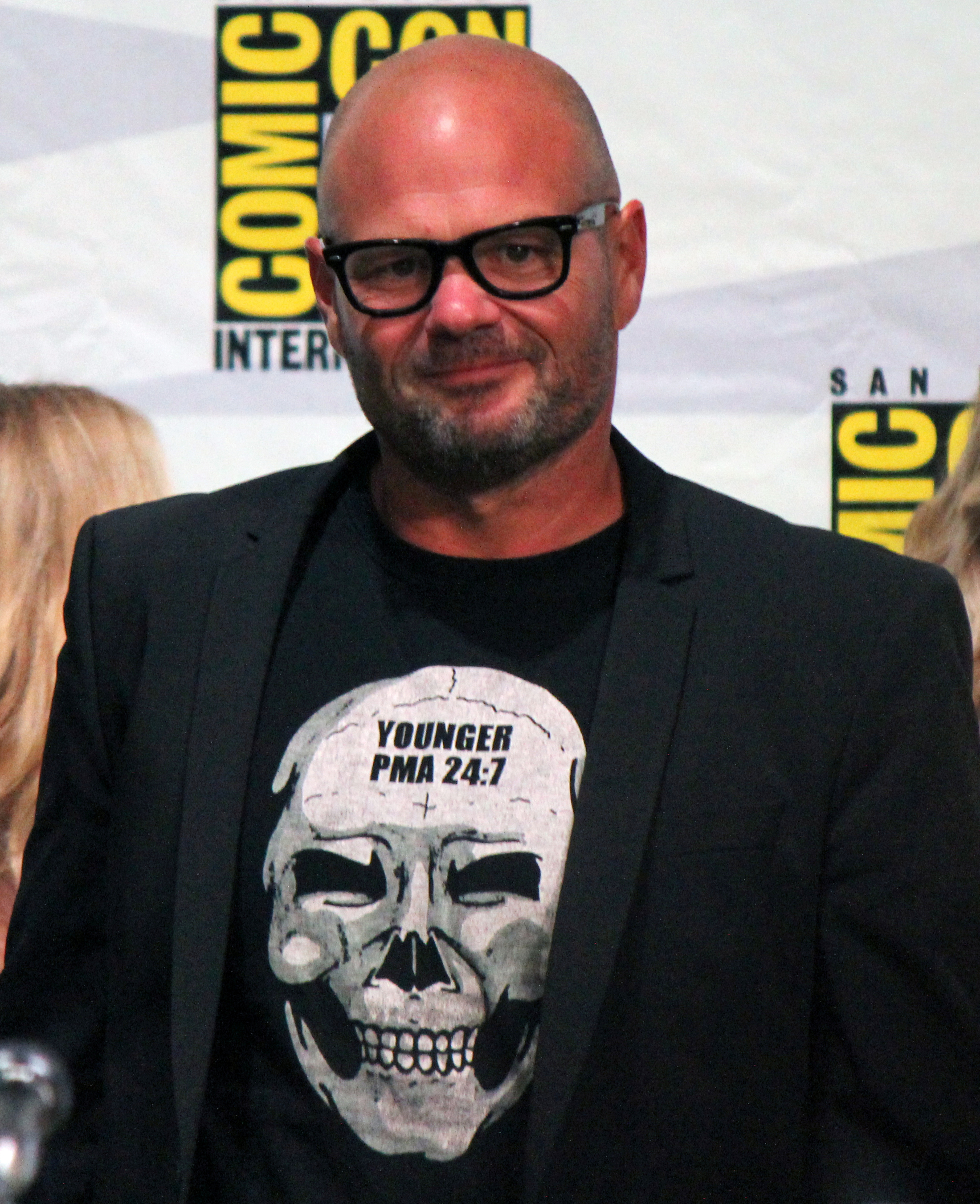
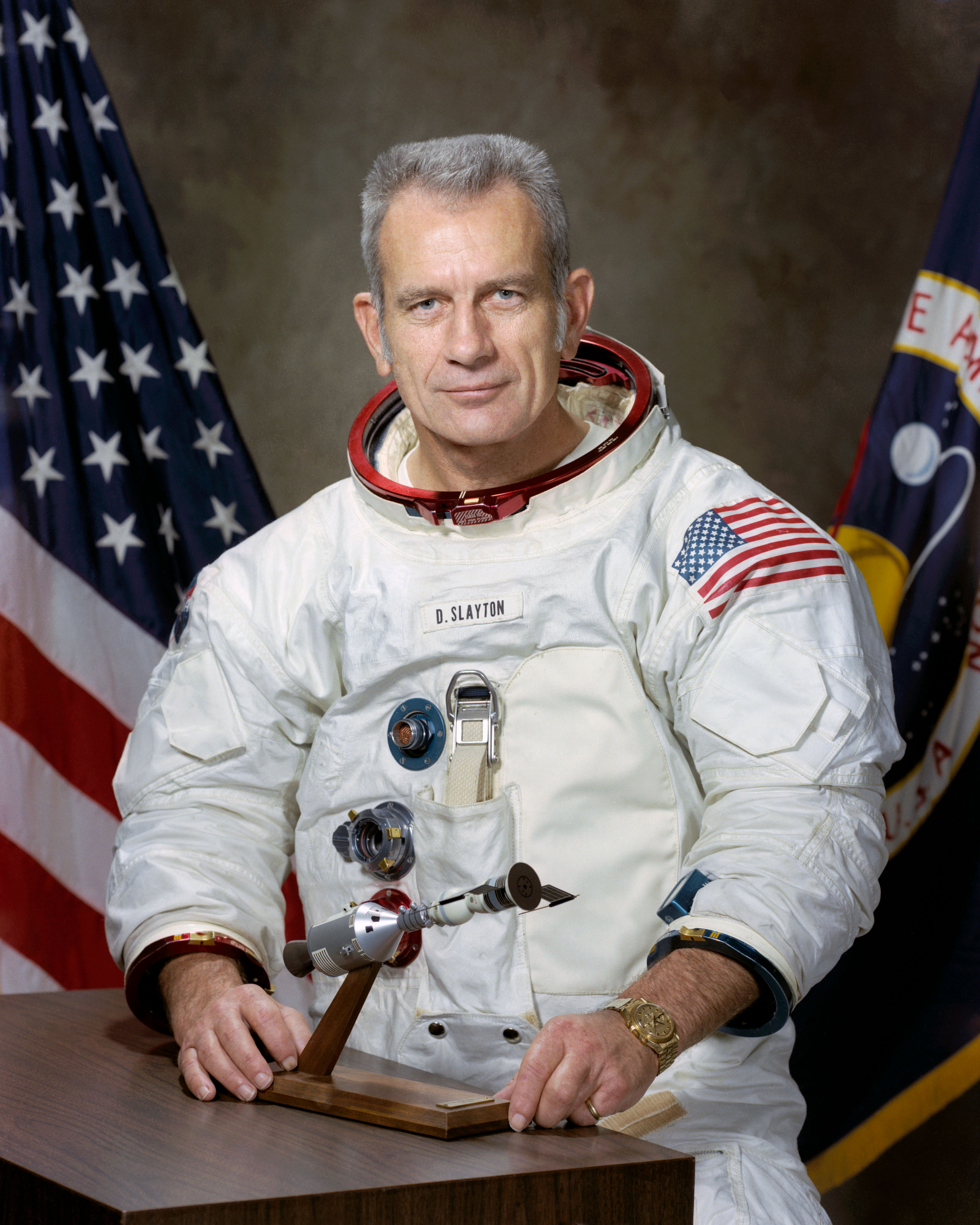
Chris Bauer portrays astronaut Deke Slayton.
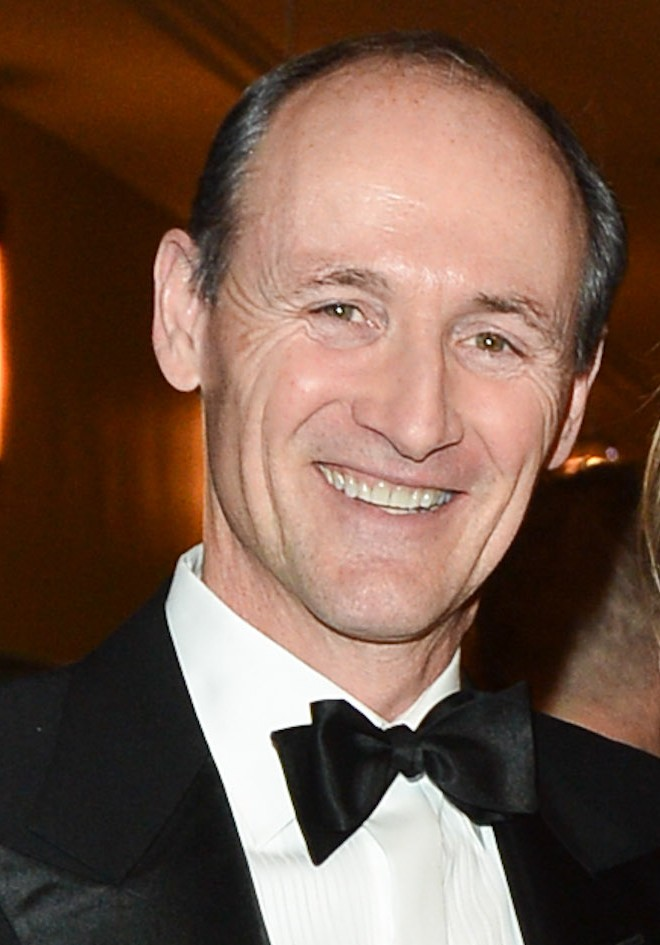
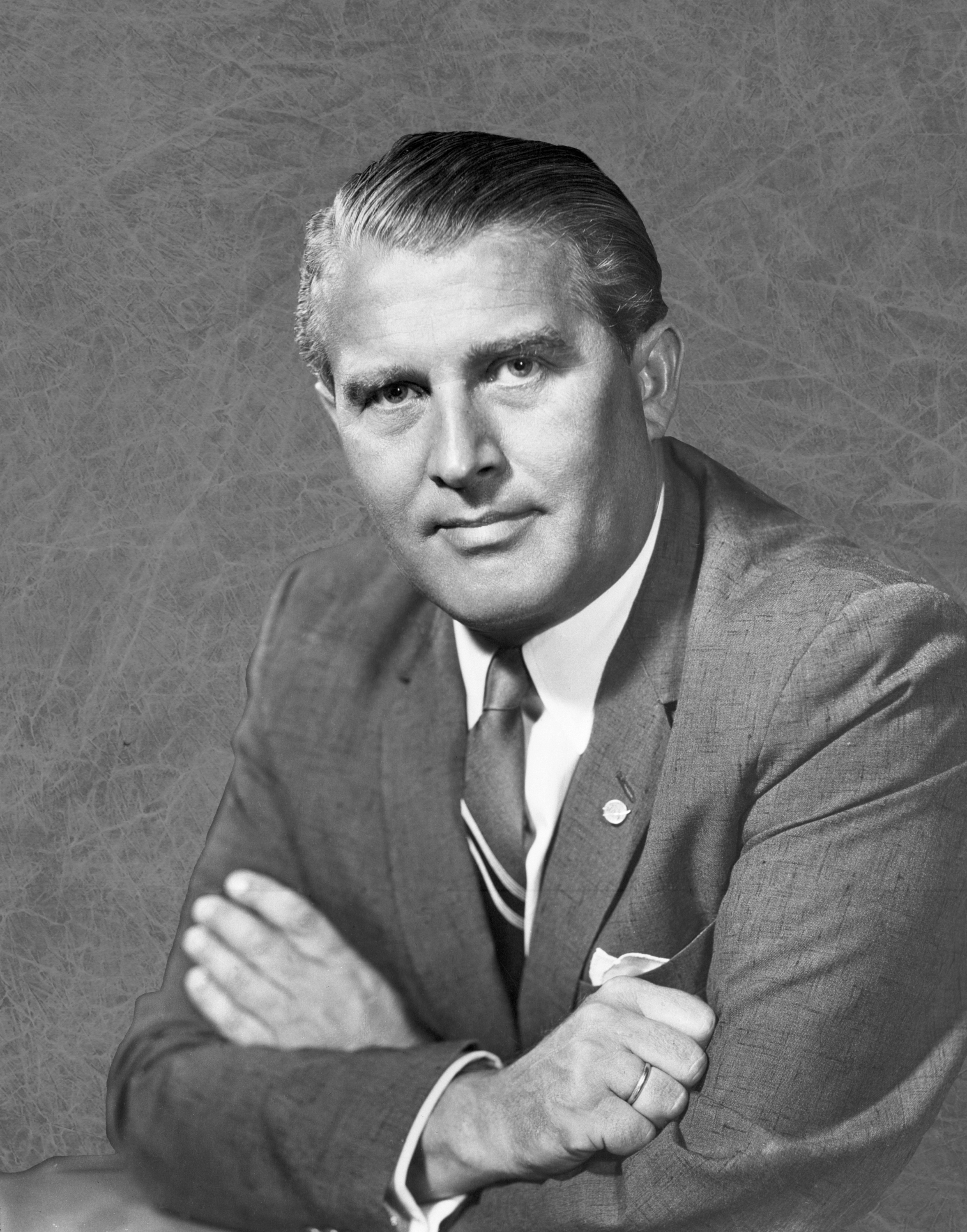
Colm Feore portrays Wernher von Braun.
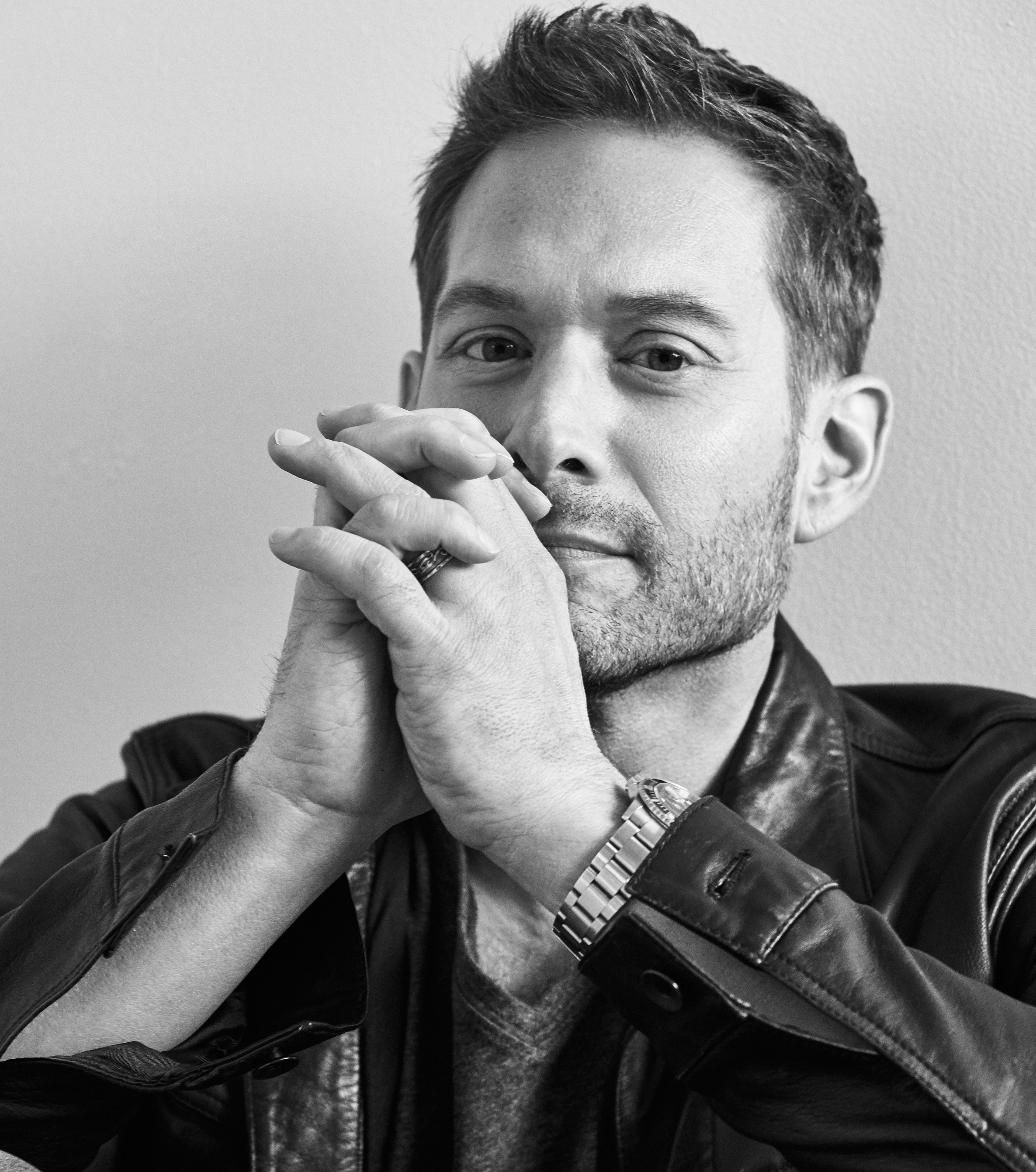
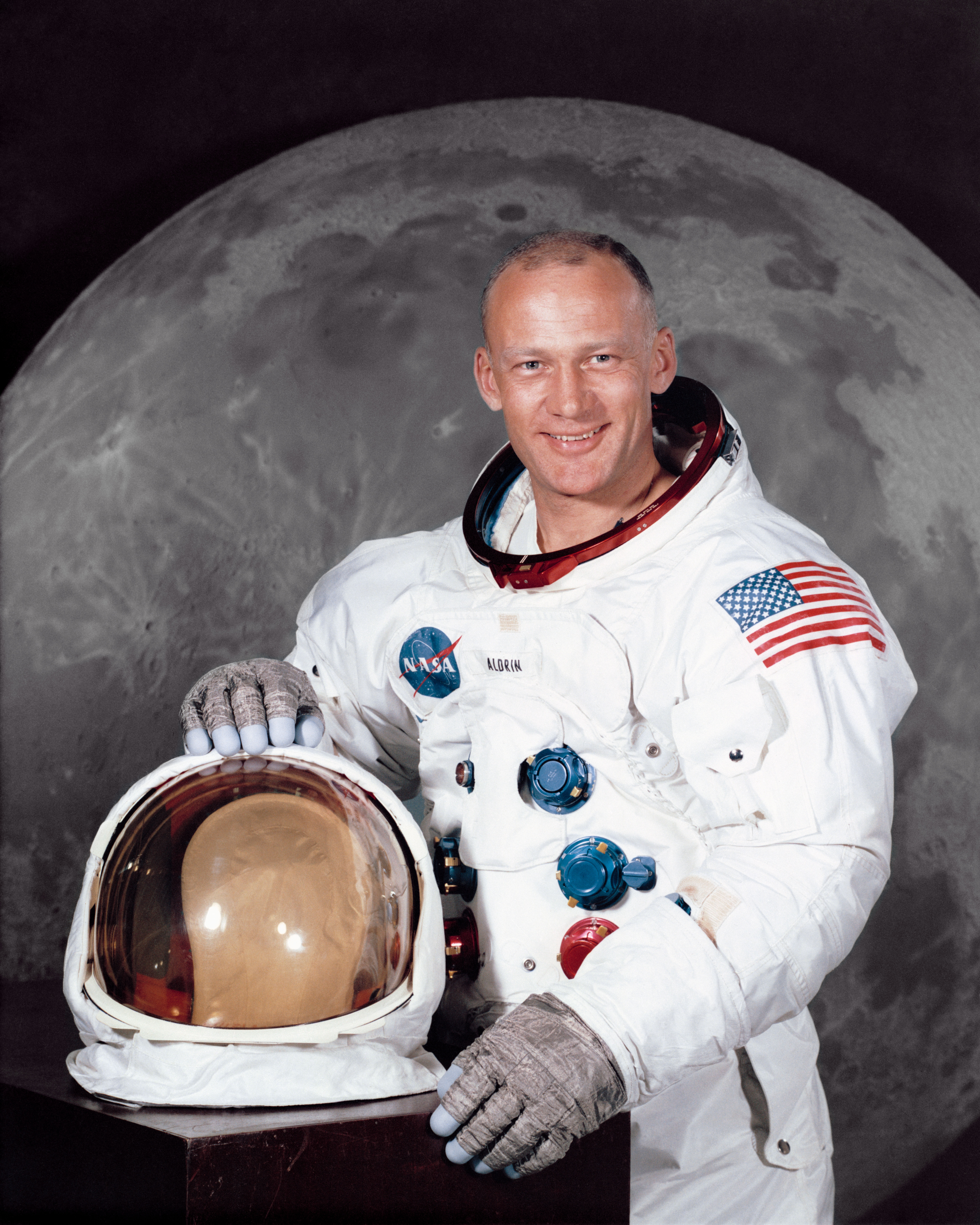
Chris Agos portrays astronaut Buzz Aldrin.
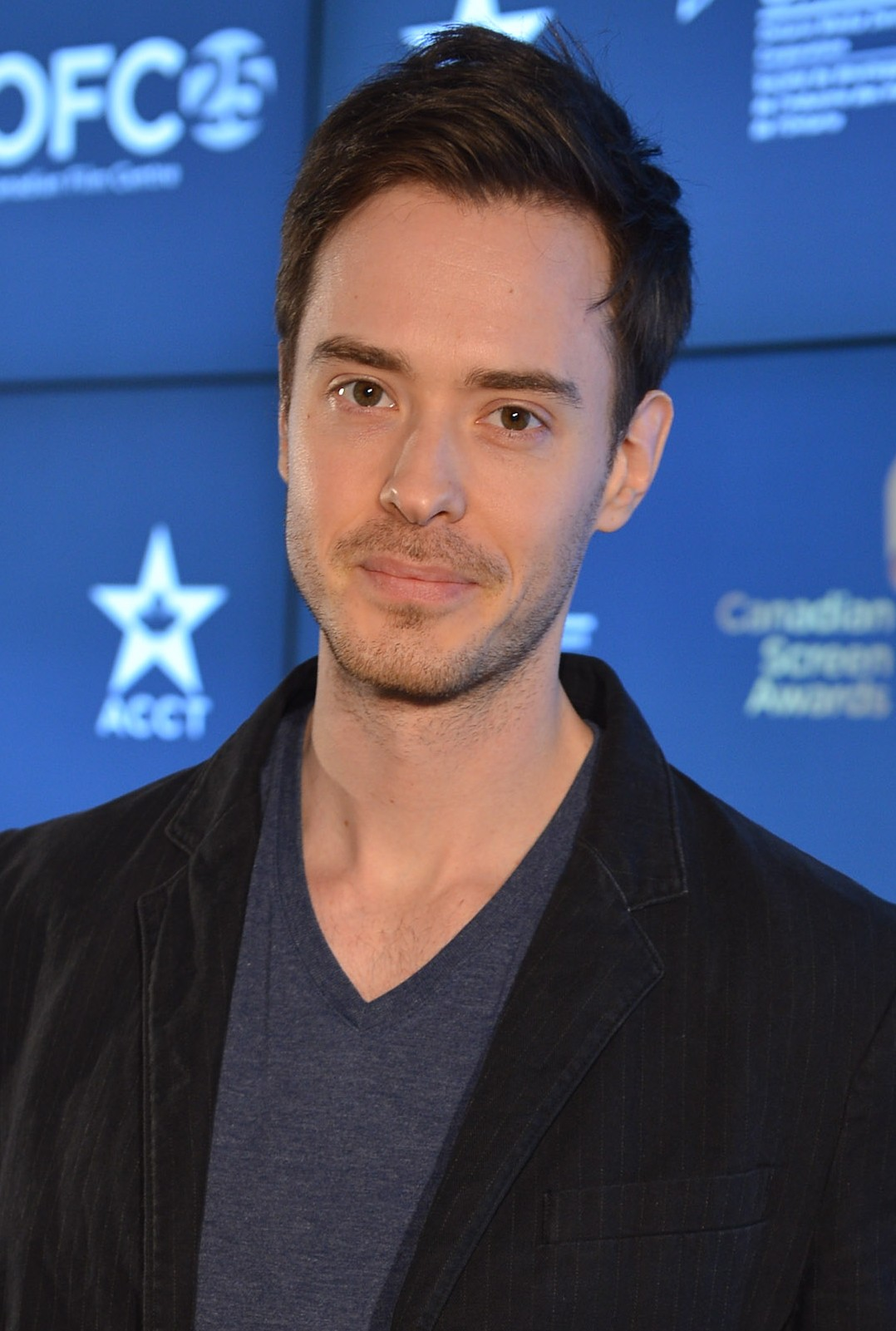
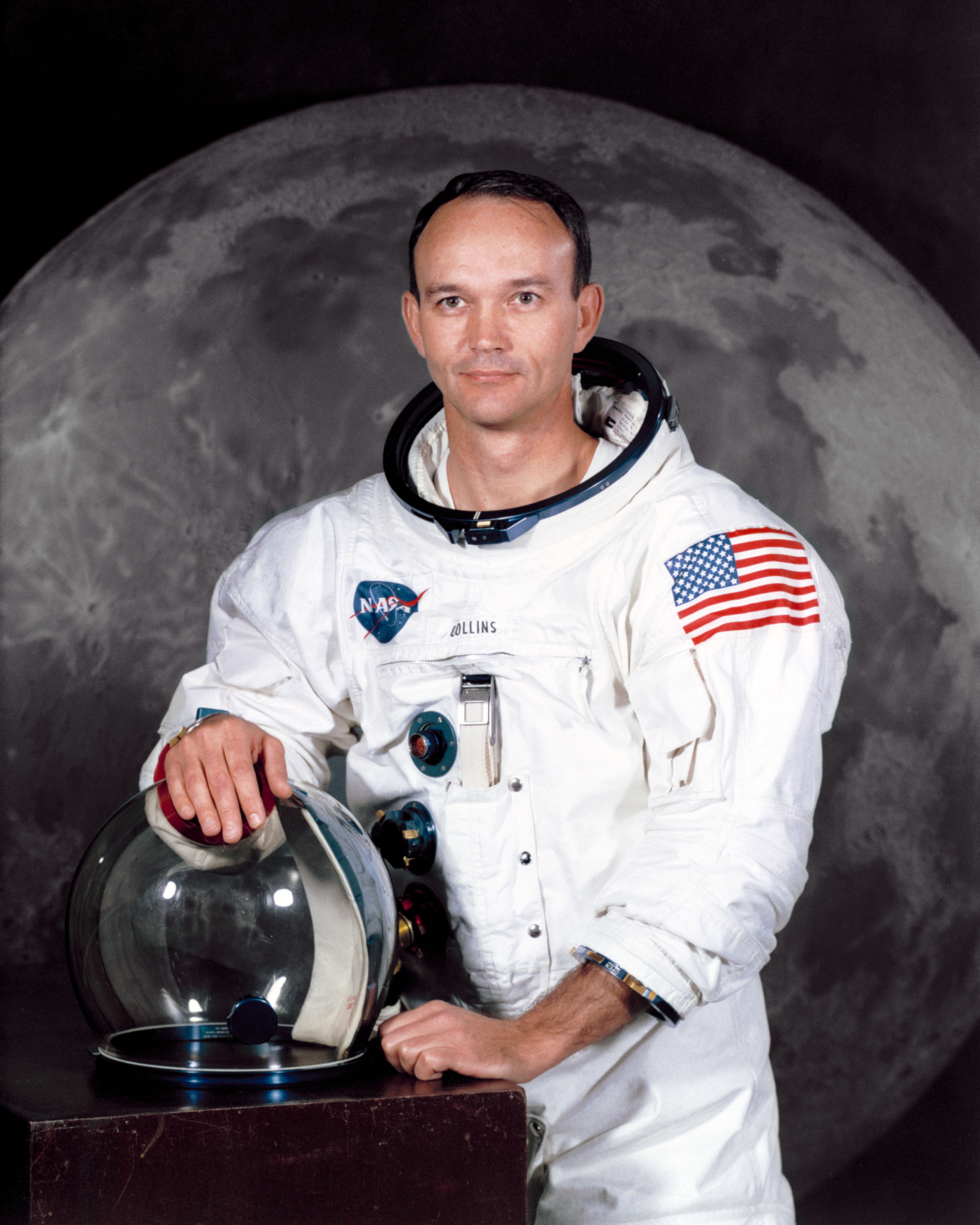
Ryan Kennedy portrays astronaut Michael Collins.
- Deke Slayton, portrayed by Chris Bauer (season 1), one of the Mercury Seven astronauts and later the Chief of the Astronaut Office and Director of Flight Crew Operations. He selected himself as a member of the Apollo 24 crew. During the mission he dies of internal bleeding due to injuries sustained during the accidental S-IVB ignition and is then buried on the Moon.
- Wernher von Braun, portrayed by Colm Feore (season 1), an aerospace engineer for NASA and former engineer for the Waffen-SS. He served as a mentor to Margo Madison, but is removed from NASA after it is revealed to the public that he knew about the treatment of slave labourers which built the V-2 rocket during the Second World War.
- Gene Kranz, portrayed by Eric Ladin (season 1), NASA's Chief Flight Director. He died when Apollo 23 exploded during repairs in 1974.
- Jack Broadstreet, portrayed by Michael Harney (season 1), a news anchor.
- Thomas O. Paine, portrayed by Dan Donohue (seasons 1–2), the Administrator of NASA, serving twice under Republican presidents Richard Nixon and Ronald Reagan. Paine proposed the idea of an American military base on the moon that would later become Jamestown. He is relieved off his duty following the 1972 United States presidential election in which Richard Nixon was defeated by Ted Kennedy but is reinstated after Ronald Reagan wins the 1976 election. He later died on Korean Airlines Flight 007. In 1990, a space telescope was named after him to honour him.
- Octavio Rosales, portrayed by Arturo Del Puerto (seasons 1, 3), an undocumented Mexican immigrant who settled in Houston with his daughter Aleida. He worked as a janitor at NASA's Johnson Space Center and used his job to encourage Aleida's interest in space. He is deported back to Mexico after his illegal status was discovered during the investigation of the Apollo 23 incident during which the FBI suspected him to be a Soviet spy. In 1992, he lives in the US again when Aleida works for NASA, helping to look after her son Javier. However, he begins to demonstrate early signs of dementia, which Aleida is unwilling to address.
- Charlie Duke, portrayed by Ben Begley (season 1), an astronaut and member of the Apollo 16 crew.
- Marge Slayton (née Lunney), portrayed by Rebecca Wisocky (season 1), Deke's wife.
- Pam Horton, portrayed by Meghan Leathers (seasons 1–3; guest season 4), a barkeeper at the "Outpost Tavern" and a closeted lesbian who entered a relationship with Ellen Wilson but later broke up with her to pave the way for Ellen's political career. After finishing her master's degree, she became a teacher and published poet. After Ellen's public outing, the two reconciled and got married in 2001.
- Buzz Aldrin, portrayed by Chris Agos (season 1), an astronaut and member of the Apollo 11 crew.
- Michael Collins, portrayed by Ryan Kennedy (season 1), an astronaut and member of the Apollo 11 crew as well as the commander of Apollo 23. He retired after surviving the explosion of Saturn V during preparations for Apollo 23.
- William "Bill" Strausser, portrayed by Noah Harpster (seasons 1–3; guest season 4), a mission controller who worked for NASA for over 30 years before leaving to join Helios Aerospace. He clashed with Aleida Rosales in season two, but later formed a friendship with her and mentored her. He retired following the bombing of the JSC, which left him paralyzed.
- Tim "Bird Dog" McKiernan, portrayed by Nick Toren (seasons 1–2), a mission controller.
- Hank Poppen, portrayed by Daniel Robbins (season 1), a mission controller.
- Frank Sedgewick, portrayed by Dave Power (season 1; guest season 2), the Command Module pilot of Apollo 15 and later the commander of Jamestown Moon Base.
- Roger Scott, portrayed by Spencer Garrett (season 1; guest season 2), a news anchor.
- Shane Baldwin, portrayed by Teddy Blum (season 1) and Tait Blum (season 1), the son of Ed and Karen Baldwin, who died of injuries sustained in a car accident in 1974.
- Jimmy Stevens, portrayed by William Lee Holler (season 1), Zakary Risinger (guest season 1) and David Chandler (seasons 2–3), the younger son of Gordo and Tracy Stevens. In 1994, he becomes involved with a group of conspiracy theorists and anti-NASA activists, believing that NASA lied about the circumstances of his parents' deaths. In Season four, it's revealed in a news broadcast that he testifies against the group in exchange for a lighter prison sentence.
- Emma Jorgens, portrayed by Teya Patt (seasons 1–3), initially an MSC receptionist and later Margo's assistant.
- Cata, portrayed by Krystal Torres (season 1), one of Aleida and Octavio Rosales' roommates in Houston.
- Larry Wilson, portrayed by Nate Corddry (seasons 1–3), a NASA engineer and Ellen's eventual husband. Like Ellen in the first two seasons, he is in the closet about being gay. He and Ellen have a lavender marriage to give each other cover, after the FBI suspected him to be a Soviet spy during the investigation of the Apollo 23 incident. In 1993, he became the first ever First Gentleman of the United States. While in office, he entertained an affair with White House employee Jeremy Zielke.
- Air Force General Arthur Weber, portrayed by Dan Warner (season 1), military liaison to NASA.
- Wayne Cobb, portrayed by Lenny Jacobson (seasons 1–2; guest season 3), Molly's pot-smoking artist husband, who also developed a good friendship with Karen Baldwin, bonding over being the partners of astronauts.
- Clayton Poole, portrayed by Edwin Hodge (season 1), Danielle's first husband, a Vietnam veteran who suffered from PTSD, which ultimately caused him to commit suicide.
- Gloria Sedgewick, portrayed by Tracy Mulholland (season 1), the wife of Frank Sedgewick.
- Harold Weisner, portrayed by Wallace Langham (season 1), the NASA administrator in the Ted Kennedy administration.
- Irene Hendricks, portrayed by Leonora Pitts (seasons 1–2), the first female flight director, replacing Gene Kranz when he is made new director of Johnson space center before his death in the Apollo 23 incident.
- Gavin Donahue, portrayed by James Urbaniak (season 1), an FBI agent, who investigated the Apollo 23 incident.
- Andrea Walters, portrayed by Megan Dodds (season 1; guest season 2), a news anchor.

=== Introduced in season two ===
- Air Force General Nelson Bradford, portrayed by John Marshall Jones (season 2; guest season 3), military liaison to NASA in the 80's and later Chairman of the Joint Chiefs of Staff under President Ellen Wilson.
- Gary Piscotty, portrayed by Michael Benz (season 2), the pilot of Pathfinder
- Helena Webster, portrayed by Michaela Conlin (season 2), a Marine pilot and astronaut who kicked off the 1983 Lunar/International incident after shooting a cosmonaut reaching for a translation card.
- Steve Pomeranz, portrayed by Tim Jo (season 2), an astronaut stationed on Jamestown Moon Base.
- Paul Michaels, portrayed by Charlie Schlatter (season 2), a news anchor.
- Amy Chang, portrayed by Linda Park (season 2), a news anchor.
- Alex Rossi, portrayed by Scott Michael Campbell (season 2; guest season 3), an astronaut and the commander of Jamestown Moon Base in 1983.
- Dr. Kouri, portrayed by Kayla Blake (season 2), an astronaut stationed on Jamestown Moon Base.
- Sally Ride, portrayed by Ellen Wroe (season 2), an astronaut and member of the Pathfinder crew.
- Paul DeWeese, portrayed by Alex Akpobome (season 2), an astronaut stationed on Jamestown Moon Base.
- Nick Corrado, portrayed by Daniel David Stewart (seasons 2–3), an astronaut stationed on Jamestown Moon Base and later part of Helios Aerospace' Mars mission, where he died during a landslide caused by a drilling accident.
- Vance Paulson, portrayed by Connor Tillman (season 2), head of the Marine detachment at Jamestown, who gets shot and killed by a cosmonaut during the 1983 conflict.
- Charles Bernitz, portrayed by Zac Titus (seasons 2–3), a Marine and astronaut. He later joined a group of conspiracy theorists, believing that NASA lied about the events on Jamestown Moon Base and about the death of his friend Vance. He organized the bombing of the Johnson Space Center and also died in the explosion.
- Jason Wilhelm, portrayed by Andre Boyer (season 2), a Marine and astronaut.
- Steve Lopez, portrayed by Chris Cortez (season 2), a Marine and astronaut.
- Sam Cleveland, portrayed by Jeff Hephner (season 2; guest season 3), Tracy's second husband and later Karen's business partner as joint owners of the Polaris space hotel, after he bought the Outpost Tavern from her to turn it into a franchise. He died in the Polaris disaster in 1992.
- Nathan Morrison, portrayed by Josh Duvendeck (season 2), an astronaut and member of the Apollo–Soyuz crew.
- Rolan Efimovitch Baranov, portrayed by Alexander Sokovikov (seasons 2–3), a cosmonaut, who is shot by one of the space marines. After being brought to Jamestown for medical treatment, he asked for political asylum, as he wanted to leave the Soviet Union. His fellow Cosmonauts then attacked Jamestown, believing that he was kidnapped. In 1994, he works for NASA and is a member of Danielle Poole's Sojourner–1 crew, which made him one of the first humans on Mars.

=== Introduced in season three ===
- Corey Johnson, portrayed by Sean Patrick Thomas (seasons 3–4), Danielle's second husband in 1992.
- Isaiah Johnson, portrayed by Justice (season 3; guest season 4), Corey's son and Danielle's step-son.
- Victor Diaz, portrayed by Jorge Diaz (seasons 3–4; guest season 5), Aleida's husband. Conflict between him and Aleida over how to address her father Octavio's dementia led to them being briefly separated.
- Amber Stevens, portrayed by Madeline Bertani (season 3; guest season 4), Danny's wife.
- Nuri Prabakar, portrayed by Sahana Srinivasan (season 3; guest season 4), Margo's new assistant.
- Grigory Kuznetsov, portrayed by Lev Gorn (season 3; guest season 4), a cosmonaut and the commander of Mars–94, the Soviet Mars mission, before dying during the failed Kronos mission in 2003.
- Lenara Catiche, portrayed by Vera Cherny (season 3; guest season 4), the director of Roscosmos.
- Janice Haan, portrayed by Patricia Mizen (season 3), a reporter.
- Karla Dunn, portrayed by Hailey Winslow (season 3), a reporter.
- Edward Kline, portrayed by Ken Rudulph (season 3), a news anchor.
- Richard Truly, portrayed by John Hartmann (season 3), the Administrator of NASA in 1992.
- Javier Diaz, portrayed by Tiago Martinez (season 3) and Santiago Veizaga (season 4), Aleida's and Victor's son.
- James "Jim" Bragg, portrayed by Randy Oglesby (seasons 3, 5), the 43rd vice president of the United States, serving President Ellen Wilson, after winning the 1992 United States presidential election against Bill Clinton. Formerly the Governor of Idaho, he is known as an anti-science evangelical politician. After Wilson comes out in 1995, Bragg becomes one of her most vocal critics, launching an ultimately unsuccessful primary challenge in 1996. In 2003, Eli Hobson mentioned that Bragg was seeking the Republican presidential nomination for 2004, which he won, becoming the 43rd president of the United States.
- Christine Francis, portrayed by Jessica Tuck (seasons 3–4; guest season 5), a news anchor.
- Heather, portrayed by Cheyenne Perez (season 3), an employee of Helios Aerospace.
- Ryan Bauer, portrayed by Larry Sullivan (season 3), a news anchor.
- Jenna Leigh, portrayed by Allison Dunbar (season 3), a news anchor.
- Will Tyler, portrayed by Robert Bailey Jr. (seasons 3–4; guest season 5), an astronaut and crew member of Sojourner–1. After landing on Mars, he came out as gay, which sparked a controversy, as gay people were not allowed to serve in the military. After returning to Earth, he worked in an administrative position at NASA.
- Sunny Hall, portrayed by Taylor Dearden (season 3), a conspiracy theorist and anti-NASA activist, who befriends Jimmy Stevens and is involved in the bombing of the JSC.
- Dick Gephardt, portrayed by Stewart Skelton (Note: Credited as Speaker of the House.) (season 3), the U.S. Speaker of the House in 1995, who opposes President Ellen Wilson and wants to defund NASA.
- Alexei Poletov, portrayed by Pawel Szajda (season 3), a cosmonaut and member of the Soviet Mars mission, Mars–94. He entered an affair with NASA astronaut Kelly Baldwin, but later died from injuries sustained during a landslide caused by a drilling accident.
- Bill McGann, portrayed by Larry Clarke (season 3; guest seasons 4–5), a news anchor.
- Adarsh Sethi, portrayed by Amol Shah (season 3), an astronaut and member of the Phoenix crew.
- Louisa Mueller, portrayed by Anne Beyer (season 3; guest season 4), an astronaut and member of the Phoenix crew.
- Lars Hagstrom, portrayed by Nick Boraine (season 3), an astronaut and member of the Phoenix crew.
- Sandy Bostik, portrayed by Mandy Levin (season 3), an astronaut and member of the Phoenix crew.
- Dr. Benjamin Harmon, portrayed by Ayinde Howell (season 3), an astronaut and member of the Phoenix crew.
- Harold "Hal" Goodman, portrayed by William Cowart (season 3), a conspiracy theorist and anti-NASA activist, who is involved in the bombing of the JSC.
- Dr. Dimitri Mayakovsky, portrayed by Goran Ivanovski (seasons 3–5; guest season 2), a cosmonaut and medical doctor stationed on the Moon in 1983 and later a member of the Mars–94 crew, the Soviet Mars mission, in 1995, where he continued to live through 2003 and 2012.
- Isabel Castillo, portrayed by Ilza Ponko (season 3), a Cuban cosmonaut and member of the Soviet Mars mission, Mars–94. She died during a landslide caused by a drilling accident.
- Richard "Dicky" Hilliard, portrayed by Blair Hickey (season 3; guest season 4), the co-founder of Helios Aerospace.

=== Introduced in season four ===
- Lee Jung-Gil, portrayed by C. S. Lee (seasons 4–5; guest seasons 3), a North Korean cosmonaut, who became the first person on Mars, after the DPRK secretly send him and fellow cosmonaut Park Chol in a supposedly uncrewed probe. The DPRK kept the mission secret to cover up a potential failed mission. Therefore, after the crash of the probe and Chol's death, Gil was also assumed to be dead until NASA commander Danielle Poole and Soviet commander Grigory Kuznetsov discovered him and returned him to their base.
- Amanda Dale, portrayed by Shannon Lucio (seasons 4–5), Miles' wife.
- Svetlana Zakharova, portrayed by Maria Mashkova (season 4), a co-pilot who was sent to Earth for accidentally injuring a cosmonaut. In the season five episode "The Hard Six", it's revealed she killed herself in her cell, though Ed speculates she was killed by the KGB.
- Artem, portrayed by Constantine Gregory (season 4), a newspaper man in Moscov.
- Sarah Dale, portrayed by Coco Day (season 4), Miles' and Amanda's older daughter.
- Graciana Diaz, portrayed by Paris Rose (season 4) and Olivia Elena Aguilar (season 5), Aleida's and Victor's daughter.
- Olga Poletova, portrayed by Irina Dubova (season 4), Alexei's mother, who helps Kelly raise Alex.
- Jen Hughes, portrayed by S. Zylan Brooks (season 4), the flight director at NASA in 2003.
- Tim, portrayed by Alex Cioffi (season 4), Eli Hobson's assistant.
- Ilya Breshov, portrayed by Dimiter Marinov (seasons 4–5), a Mars space veteran and smuggler in 2003 and bar owner in 2012.
- Palmer James, portrayed by Myk Watford (seasons 4–5), the director of Human Services on Happy Valley in 2003 and Sheriff of the Mars Peacekeeper Force in 2012.
- Joanna Chapman, portrayed by Rhian Rees (season 4), a British astronaut on Happy Valley.
- Gerardo Ortiz-Niño, portrayed by Salvador Chacón (seasons 4–5), a space worker, who shared quarters with Miles Dale and Samantha Massey in 2003 and led the Mars revolts in 2012.
- Rich Waters, portrayed by Moses Jones (season 4), a space worker.
- Maya Estime, portrayed by Jo Kelly (season 4), a space worker, who shares quarters with Miles Dale and Samantha Massey.
- Cho Byung Ho, portrayed by Charles Kim (season 4), the North Korean commander on Happy Valley in 2003.
- Charlie Parfitt, portrayed by Michael Lee Joplin (season 4), a space worker.
- Petros Khorenatsi, portrayed by Nick Gracer (season 4), a space worker and smuggler.
- Faiza Khatib, portrayed by Noor Razooky (season 4), a space worker and smuggler.
- Vera Martil, portrayed by Danielle Nottingham (season 4; guest season 5), a news anchor.
- Mike Bishop, portrayed by Billy Lush (season 4), a NASA astronaut and team leader on Happy Valley who is revealed to be an undercover CIA agent.
- Tatyana Volkova, portrayed by Ania Bukstein (season 4), a Roscosmos engineer.
- Leonid, portrayed by Emil Markov (season 4; guest season 5), a high-ranking Roscosmos official.
- Luka Gurino, portrayed by Sebastiano Pigazzi (season 4), a space worker.
- Geraldine Middaugh, portrayed by Steph Evison Williams (season 4), a space worker.
- Timur Avilov, portrayed by Nikita Bogolyubov (season 4), a space worker who is revealed to be an undercover KGB agent.
- Veronica "Ronnie" Hunt, portrayed by Tess Lina (seasons 4–5), a Helios worker on Happy Valley and one of the strike leaders who became part of Dev Ayesa's plan to steal the Goldilocks asteroid in 2003 and participated in the Mars revolts in 2012.
- Ravi Vaswani, portrayed by Vinny Chhibber (season 4), a NASA engineer, astronaut and pilot of the Ranger-2 mission to capture the Goldilocks asteroid.
- Holly "Sparks" Edmondson, portrayed by Cindy Jackson (season 4), a Helios worker on Happy Valley who became part of Dev Ayesa's plan to steal the Goldilocks asteroid.
- Nate Lowry, portrayed by Sean Patrick Murphy (season 4), Security personnel on Happy Valley
- Nina Rozhenkova, portrayed by Katarina Morhacova (season 4), a Soviet cosmonaut.
- Dr. Seth Razack, portrayed by Ely Henry (season 4), a mission controller.
- Maximus Taylor, portrayed by Elliott Ross (season 4), an ESA astronaut on the Ranger.
- Park Chui Moo, portrayed by Mark Kwak (season 4), a North Korean cosmonaut on the Ranger.

=== Introduced in season five ===
- Fred Stanislaus, portrayed by Tyler Labine (season 5), a Mars Peacekeeper.
- Marcus Haskell, portrayed by Barrett Carnahan (season 5), a recent high school graduate living on Mars and friend of Alex and Lily, who befriended Avery after joining the OPEF.
- Dan Guerra, portrayed by AJ Cedeño (season 5), a news anchor.
- Silvio Costa, portrayed by Jonathan Medina (season 5), a Mars resident, who joins Miles Dale's Sons & Daughters of Mars meetings.
- Nam Moon Yeong, portrayed by Chen Chen Julian (guest season 4) and Banyah Maria Choi (season 5), Lee's wife.
- Gulsora Akilmatova, portrayed by Yael Chanukov (season 5), a recent high school graduate living on Mars and friend of Alex, Lily and Marcus.
- Fyodor Korzhenko, portrayed by Dimitar Bakalov (season 5; guest season 4), the new president of the Soviet Union, who overthrew Mikhail Gorbachev in 2003.
- Sai Madoun, portrayed by Faruk Amireh (season 5), an inspector of the Mars Peacekeeper force.
- Malka Peretz, portrayed by Roni Geva (season 5), a Mars resident, who joins Miles Dale's Sons & Daughters of Mars meetings.
- Zoey Chase, portrayed by Thea Andrews (season 5; guest season 4), a news anchor.
- Walt Griebel, portrayed by Christopher Denham (season 5), the commander of Helios' Titan mission.
- Shireen Al-Jabiri, portrayed by Sara Boutine (season 5), a Helios employee on Mars.
- Vincente Spano, portrayed by Samuel Dunning (season 5), a Mars Peacekeeper.
- Louis Beaufort, portrayed by Jean-Michel Richaud (season 5), a Mars Peacekeeper.
- Gary Johnson, portrayed by Chris Rickett (season 5), a Mars resident.
- Natalya "Tasha" Polivanova, portrayed by Olga Fonda (season 5), Leonid Polivanov's wife.
- Stuart "Stu" Fraser, portrayed by Rueben Grundy (season 5), a Helios astronaut on Mars and member of their Titan mission.
- Mahmoud Hesar, portrayed by Nick Massouh (season 5), a worker on Happy Valley.
- Kovacic, portrayed by Max Deacon (season 5), a Mars Peacekeeper.
- Manuel Ruiz, portrayed by Keith Miller (season 5), an OPEF Marine serving with Avery.
- Elena Beaufort, portrayed by Kristina Klebe (season 5), a Helios astronaut on Mars and member of their Titan mission.
- Oleg Vyshinsky, portrayed by Michael Klesic (season 5), a Helios astronaut on Mars and member of their Titan mission.
- Zuzana Khan, portrayed by Arasha Lalani (season 5), a Helios employee on Mars.
- Auggie Kazlauskas, portrayed by Sebastyan Meixger (season 5), a Mars resident.
- Raymond Dixon, portrayed by Kameron J. Brown (season 5), an OPEF Marine serving with Avery.
- Zach Fleming, portrayed by Jackie Kay (season 5), an OPEF Marine serving with Avery.
- Lucia Hernandez, portrayed by Whitney Ortega (season 5), an OPEF Marine serving with Avery.
- Andrew Cedar, portrayed by Kalama Epstein (season 5), an OPEF Marine serving with Avery.
- Fumiko, portrayed by Masumi (season 5), a leading member of Sons & Daughters of Mars.
- Tim, portrayed by James Michael McHale (season 5), a controller at the MOCC.

== Minor characters ==
=== Introduced in season one ===
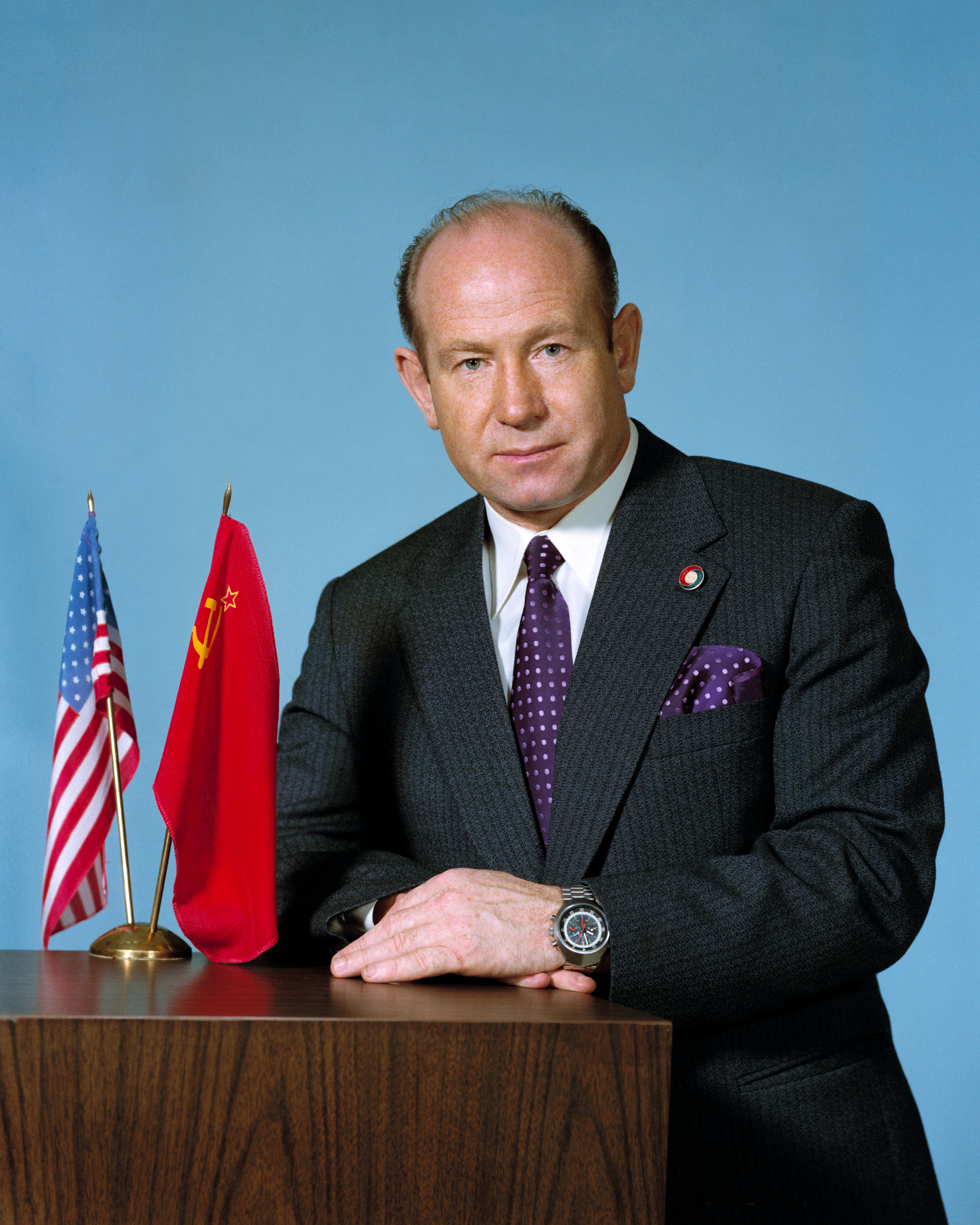
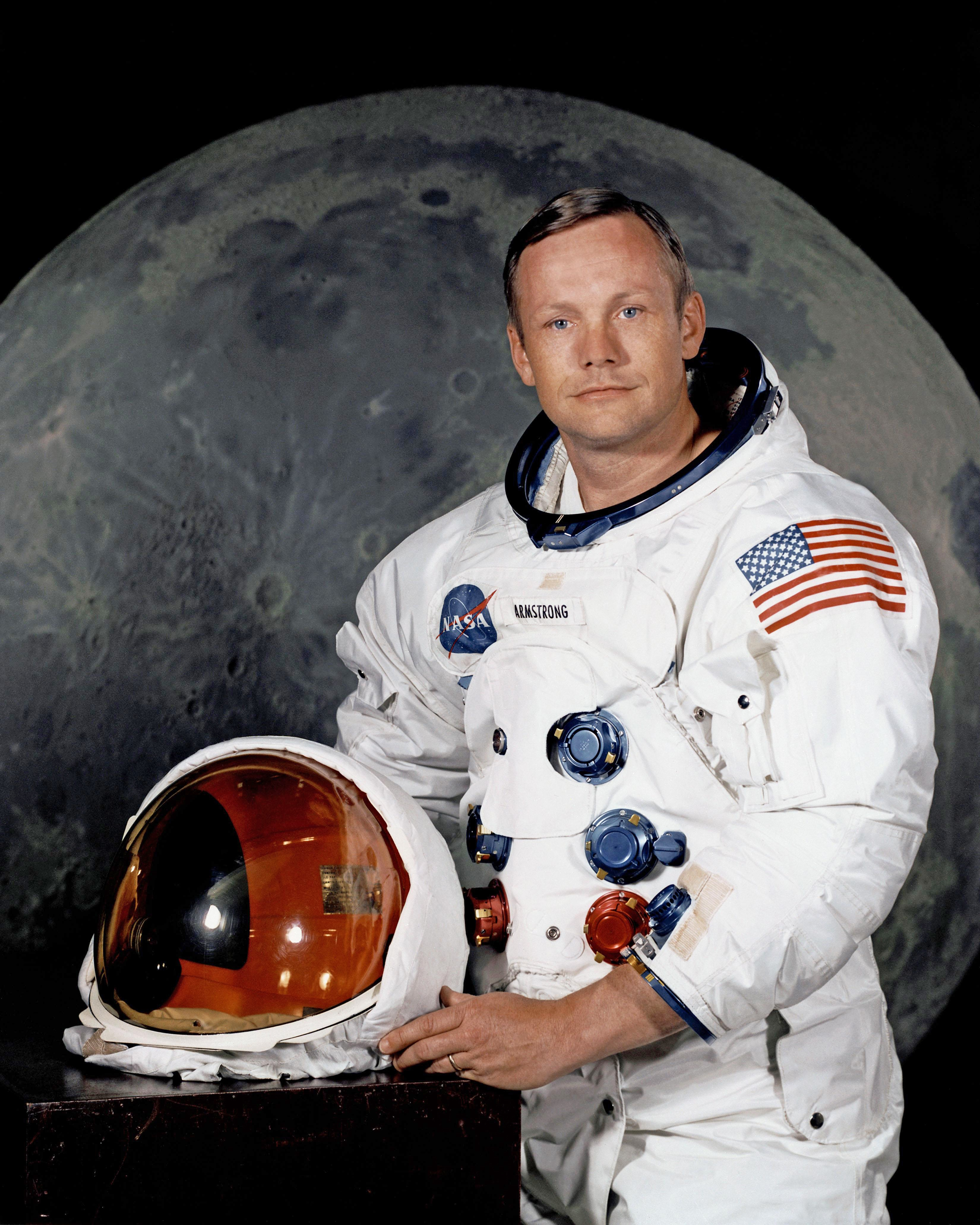
In the alternate timeline, Soviet cosmonaut Alexei Leonov becomes the first man on the Moon instead of American astronaut Neil Armstrong.
- Neil Armstrong, portrayed by Jeff Branson (season 1), the commander of Apollo 11. He became the second man on the Moon, following soviet cosmonaut Alexei Leonov.
- Paul Santoro, portrayed by Deniz Akdeniz (season 1), a journalist who writes an article about NASA missing the opportunity to let Ed Baldwin and Gordo Stevens land on the Moon with Apollo 10, using Ed's "The NASA doesn't have guts anymore" quote.
- Winston Blake, portrayed by Brandon Bales (season 1), a CIA agent who met with NASA to evaluate how the Soviets managed to land on the Moon first.
- Pete Conrad, portrayed by Steven Pritchard (season 1), the Commander of Apollo 12.
- Graciana Rosales, portrayed by Vanessa Lyon (season 1), Aleida's mother. She died in 1969 shortly after the Soviet Moon landing. Her husband Octavio then moved to Houston with Aleida to fulfill her wish that her daughter can work for NASA to satisfy her interest in space.
- Charles Sandman, portrayed by Saul Rubinek (season 1), an American Republican Party politician.
- Admiral Scott Uken, portrayed by David Andrews (season 1), a United States Navy Admiral and former superior of Ed Baldwin.
- Fred Talmadge, portrayed by Nick Wechsler (season 1), the Command Module Pilot of Apollo 10.
- Ginger, portrayed by Jessica Amlee (season 1), a one-night-stand affair of Gordo Stevens.
- Patty Doyle, portrayed by Cass Buggé (season 1), a former Mercury 13 pilot. She became an astronaut candidate for NASA as one of "Nixon's Women", but died when her training module crashed.
- Shorty Powers, portrayed by Brian Stepanek (season 1), an American public affairs officer working for NASA.
- Ray Schumer, portrayed by Benjamin Seay (season 1), a NASA engineer who presented the idea of hidden ice in the lunar craters, which led to NASA choosing the Shackleton Crater as location for Jamestown Moon Base.
- Janice, portrayed by Devin McCarthy (season 1), an astronaut candidate for NASA as one of "Nixon's Women", but wasn't selected for the final program.
- Megan Shearin, portrayed by Kate Rodman (season 1), an astronaut candidate for NASA as one of "Nixon's Women", but wasn't selected for the final program.
- Barbara Taylor, portrayed by Leia Hurst (season 1), an astronaut candidate for NASA as one of "Nixon's Women", but wasn't selected for the final program.
- John Glenn, portrayed by Matt Battaglia (season 1), one of the Mercury Seven astronauts, who was the first American astronaut in Earth orbit.
- Dr. Chase, portrayed by Korey Simeone (season 1), the flight surgeon for Apollo 15.
- Scott Kraus, portrayed by Martin Grey (season 1), a NASA engineer who was killed in the explosion of Apollo 23 alongside Gene Kranz.
- Mike Russell, portrayed by Michael James Bell (season 1), the principal of Shane Baldwin's and Danny Stevens' school.
- Harrison Liu, portrayed by Stephen Oyoung (season 1), an astronaut and member of the Apollo 24 crew. He died during the accidental S-IVB ignition.
- Dr. Robert Marsten, portrayed by John Rubinstein (season 1), Gordo's psychiatrist.
- Barry Newsome, portrayed by David Gautreaux (season 1), a talkshow host who interviewed the Apollo 24 crew.
- Dr. David Josephson, portrayed by Scott Alan Smith (season 1), a surgeon at a Houston hospital who treated Shane Baldwin after his accident.
- Grush, portrayed by Brian Johnson (season 1), an astronaut and back up for Apollo 24.
- Pendle, portrayed by Jeff Denton (seasons 1–2), an astronaut and back up for Apollo 24.
- Jerry Biddle, portrayed by Kevin Glikmann (season 1), a reporter for the Houston Sentinel who attempted to interview Karen Baldwin after Shane's accident.
- Dr. Weddle, portrayed by Jan Munroe (season 1), a NASA neurologist who Karen Baldwin asked for a second opinion on Shane's health status.
- Mikhail Mikhailovich Vasiliev, portrayed by Mark Ivanir (season 1), a Soviet cosmonaut who was held as a prisoner on Jamestown Moon Base by Ed Baldwin in 1974 and hid a listening device, which wasn't discovered by NASA until 1983.
- Dennis Lambert, portrayed by Charlie Hofheimer (season 1), an astronaut and member of the Apollo 25 crew.
- Cecilia Liu, portrayed by Aria Song (season 1), the wife of astronaut Harrison Liu.
- Penny Chen, portrayed by Carin Chea (season 1), a flight controller for Apollo 24.
- Carl Reid, portrayed by Theo Iyer (season 1), a flight controller for Apollo 24 and 25.
- Sam, portrayed by Brian McGrath (season 1), a NASA engineer and flight controller for Apollo 24.

=== Introduced in season two ===
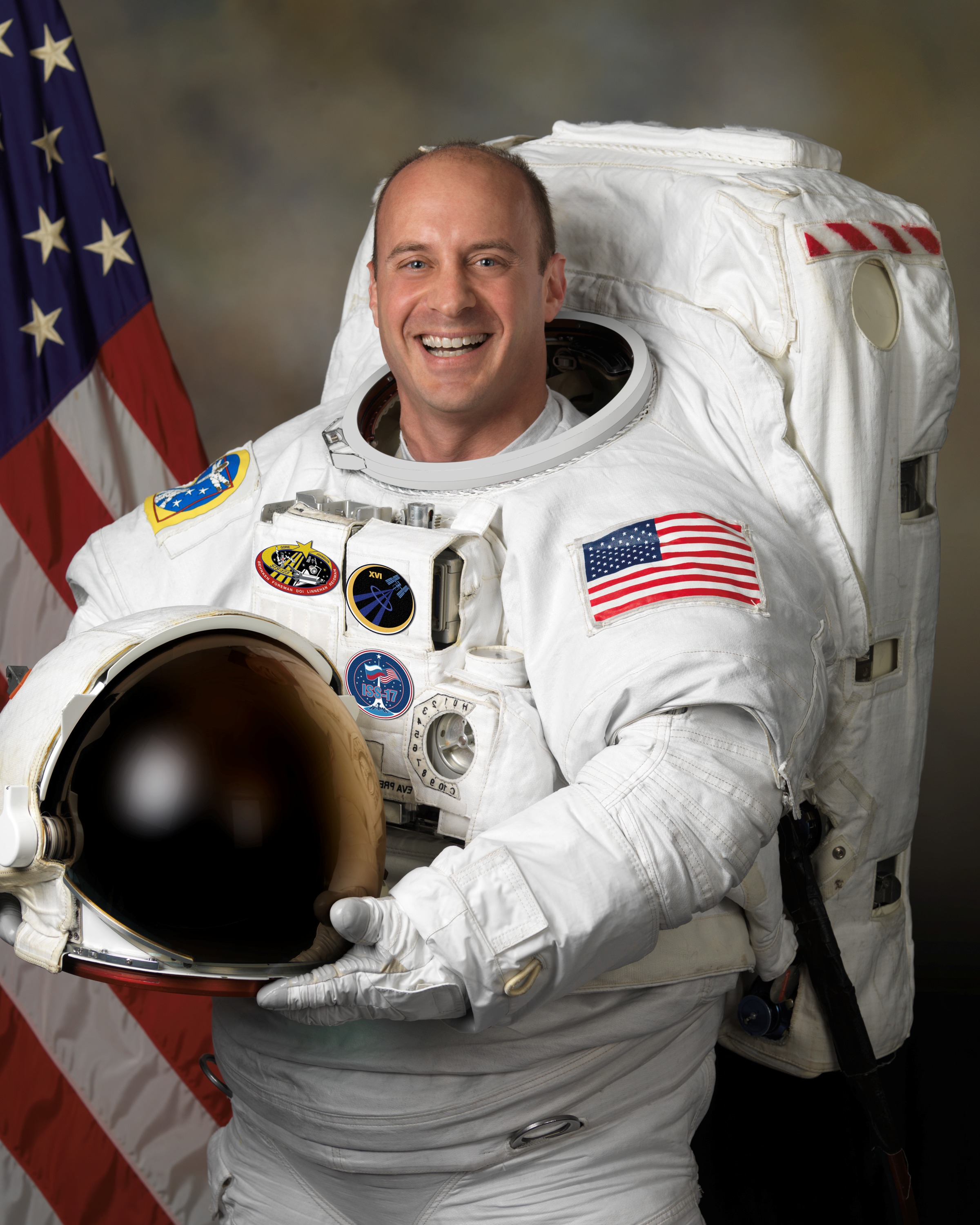
Former astronaut Garrett Reisman, technical consultant on the show, cameos as a fictionalized version of himself in the second season.

- Wubbo Ockels, portrayed by Bjørn Alexander (season 2), an astronaut stationed on Jamestown. He left NASA following injuries sustained during a solar storm.
- Carl Cartwright, portrayed by Brad Beyer (season 2), an astronaut stationed on Jamestown.
- Doreen Campbell, portrayed by Penny O'Brien (season 2), an Irish scientist and astronaut stationed on Skylab, the first space station in Earth's orbit. In 1983, she detected a coronal mass ejection and warned the astronauts on the Moon about the impending lethal doses of deadly solar radiation.
- Garrett Reisman portrayed by Garrett Reisman (Note: Reisman cameos as a fictionalized version of himself.) (season 2), a shuttle pilot. Reisman also served as a technical consultant on the show and was partially involved in the development after he and showrunner Ron Moore had discussed the possibility of a timeline in which the Soviet Union landed people on the Moon before the US.
- Peter, portrayed by Justice Leak (season 2), Larry Wilson's lover in 1983.
- Davey Kowalski, portrayed by Alexander Neher (seasons 2–3), Aleida's boyfriend, who was a bad influence on her. He was an oil worker and protested against NASA in the 90's because the mining of Helium-3 from the lunar surface threatened the oil economy.
- Rae Poole, portrayed by Yaani King Mondschein (season 2), Danielle's sister-in-law.
- Coral Hiscoe, portrayed by Carolyn Crotty (season 2), an engineer at NASA in 1983, responsible for the astronaut's spacesuits.
- Leland Davis, portrayed by Andrew Gonzalez (season 2), an engineer at NASA in 1983, responsible for the astronaut's spacesuits.
- Doug Price, portrayed by Chris L. McKenna (season 2), an astronaut stationed on Jamestown.
- Elise, portrayed by Mele Ihara (season 2), Pam's new girlfriend in the 80's.
- Stepan Petrovich Alexseev, portrayed by Nikola Djuricko (season 2), a cosmonaut and the Soviet commander of the Apollo–Soyuz mission.
- Radislav Semenovich Orlov, portrayed by Alexander Babara (season 2), a cosmonaut on the Apollo–Soyuz mission.
- William Waverly, portrayed by Bruce Weitz (season 2), Ellen's father.
- Nguyen Linh, portrayed by Lily Huynh (season 2), Kelly's biological sister.
- Dr. Mitchell, portrayed by Wendy Schenker (season 2), an ophthalmologist who examined Molly Cobb for the sight disorder she experienced after her return from the Moon.
- Nguyen Van Le, portrayed by Long Nguyen (season 2), Kelly's biological father.
- Lee Atwater, portrayed by Dustin Seavey (season 2), an American political consultant and strategist for the Republican Party who advised Ellen Wilson, which started her political career.
- Colonel Viktor Tsukanov, portrayed by Eugene Alper (season 2), a cosmonaut stationed on the Soviet Moon Base.
- Liz Phang, portrayed by Jinny Chung (season 2), an engineer at NASA in 1983, responsible for the astronaut's spacesuits.
- Natalie Bishop, portrayed by Julie Brett (season 2), an astronaut stationed on Jamestown.
- Cameron Wolfgeher, portrayed by Timothy Ware-Hill (season 2), the military CAPCOM for Pathfinder.
- Jonathan Gatos, portrayed by Joe Sobalo Jr. (season 2), an astronaut stationed on Jamestown.

=== Introduced in season three ===
- Yvonne, portrayed by Ashley Jones (season 3), Ed's second wife in the 1990s. They split up following the Polaris disaster.
- Commander Rich LaPorte, portrayed by Derek Webster (season 3), the commander of the Polaris space hotel.
- Joaquin Asencio, portrayed by Andres Londono (season 3), a controller and technician working aboard the Polaris space hotel who was killed during the disaster.
- General Jeanette Masters, portrayed by Fran de Leon (season 3), military liaison to NASA.
- Pastor Dirkson, portrayed by Thomas Crawford (season 3), a pastor, who officiated the wedding of Danny and Amber Stevens on board the Polaris space hotel.
- Scotty Wilson, portrayed by Milo Cragnotti (season 3), Ellen's and Larry's son.
- Peter Strauss, portrayed by Jonny Coyne (season 3), a KGB agent who blackmailed Margo Madison with photos of her affair with Sergei Nikulov.
- Clarke Halladay, portrayed by Tony Curran (season 3), the pilot of Sojourner–1, killed during the collision with Mars–94.
- Sylvie Kaplan, portrayed by Heidi Sulzman (season 3), an astronaut and crew member of Sojourner–1, killed during the collision with Mars–94.
- Elizabeth "Zizzo" Glover, portrayed by Debbie Pollack (season 3), a biologist and member of the Phoenix crew.
- Anne Baranov, portrayed by Jessica Galinas (season 3), Rolan's wife.
- Peter Baranov, portrayed by Leo Marz (season 3), Rolan's and Anne's son.
- Jonathan Adams, portrayed by Christopher Ellay (season 3), a NASA engineer in 1994.
- Jean Williamson, portrayed by Diane Dehn (season 3), the public relations officer of the Johnson Space Center.
- Mary Meineke, portrayed by Bonnie Bailey-Reed (season 3), a NASA receptionist in 1994.
- Jeremy Zielke, portrayed by John Forest (season 3), an employee at the White House, who has an affair with Larry Wilson.
- Elliott Lewis, portrayed by Michael McMillian (season 3), an old college friend of Jeremy Zielke who leaked his affair with Larry.
- Karl Rove, portrayed by Joseph Beck (season 3), a political consultant who works for President Ellen Wilson.
- Willie Baron, portrayed by Patrick Labyorteaux (season 3), an American Democratic congressman.
- Pavel Zaitzev, portrayed by Vlad Pavlov (season 3), an engineer of Roscosmos.
- Victoria Rodriguez, portrayed by Michelle C. Bonilla (season 3), an FBI Special Agent, who investigated against Margo Madison due to her connection to Sergei Nikulov.
- Arlene Spielman, portrayed by Kristin Carey (seasons 3–4), a board member of Helios Aerospace from the mid 90s until 2003, when she was fired by Dev Ayesa.
- Park Chol, portrayed by Jason Her (season 3), a North Korean cosmonaut, who died during the landing on the Mars.

=== Introduced in season four ===
- Tom Parker, portrayed by Mac Brandt (season 4), an astronaut who is killed during the Kronos mission.
- Tom Gamon, portrayed by Dave Theune (season 4), an HR employee at Helios Aerospace who hired Miles Dale.
- Colonel George Peters, portrayed by Jay Paulson (season 4), the commander of Happy Valley in 2003, who is relieved of his duties following the failed Kronos mission.
- Kirill Semenov, portrayed by Gediminas Adomaitis (season 4), a Roscosmos official.
- Eduard Ambrosov, portrayed by Jake Renner (seasons 4–5), a Soviet news anchor.
- Shaun Arlee, portrayed by Brandon Ford Green (season 4), a space worker.
- Owen Stanwood, portrayed by Alex Parkinson (season 4), an astronaut.
- Lieutenant Stepan Gura, portrayed by Konstantin Lavysh (season 4), a Soviet police officer who interrogated Margo Madison before being killed the coup d'état that overthrew Mikhail Gorbachev.
- Colonel Vidor Kolikoff, portrayed by Nikolai Tsankov (season 4), a Soviet military officer who participated in the coup d'état that overthrew Mikhail Gorbachev in support of Fyodor Korzhenko.
- Vasily Galkin, portrayed by Eduard Osipov (season 4), a Soviet cosmonaut on Happy Valley.
- Gwan Jin Tao, portrayed by Daniel Juhn (season 4), a North Korean cosmonaut on Happy Valley.
- Katherine Hobson, portrayed by Kathe Mazur (season 4), Eli Hobson's wife.
- Leia Ascott, portrayed by Rachael Thompson (season 4), a CIA Agent assigned to NASA after the incident involving Svetlana Zakharova and Vasily Galkin.
- Lev Babanin, portrayed by Alexander Terentyev (season 4), a high-ranking Roscosmos official.
- Mike Shaw, portrayed by Luke Barnett (seasons 4–5), a Helios worker on Happy Valley.
- Yevgeniy, portrayed by Nicholas Kolev (season 4), a high-ranking Soviet cosmonaut on Happy Valley.
- Malaika Ayesa, portrayed by Valeri Ross (season 4), Dev Ayesa's mother.
- Brandt Darby, portrayed by Dustin Ingram (season 4), a Helios employee working in government relations.
- Ron Klain, portrayed by Jon Levine (season 4), a political consultant working for President Al Gore in 2003.
- Dimitri Egotov, portrayed by Sacha Seberg (season 4), a Roscosmos engineer on Happy Valley.
- Natalia Morioka, portrayed by Madara Jayasena (season 4), a NASA astronomer at the Goddard Space Flight Center who discovered the Goldilocks asteroid.
- Kate Marsteller, portrayed by Libby Baker (season 4), a NASA astronomer who presented the discovery of the Goldilocks asteroid to NASA administrator Eli Hobson.
- Henry Keck, portrayed by Gene Silvers (season 4), a space worker.
- Kenji Okumura, portrayed by Yuji Hasegawa (season 4), the JAXA delegate at the M-7 summit in 2003.
- Kapalna Naran, portrayed by Deepti Gupta (season 4), the ISRO delegate at the M-7 summit in 2003.
- Robert Burks, portrayed by David Bowe (season 4), the CIA Deputy Director in 2003.
- Nick Jennings, portrayed by Chris Jaymes (season 4), a NASA engineer on Happy Valley who died in an explosion while trying to bypass the Helios worker strike.
- Muriel Bezukhov, portrayed by Heather Lee (season 4), Sergei Nikulov's wife in 2003.
- Courtney Johnson, portrayed by April Mae Davis (season 4), Isaiah's wife.

=== Introduced in season five ===
- Gene Irving, portrayed by Alan Wells (season 5), a Helios official in Houston.
- Belinda Thompson, portrayed by Geri-Nikole Love (season 5), a doctor on Mars.
- Ralph Roy, portrayed by Joel Spence (season 5), a journalist for National News Channel on Mars.
- Pat Haskell, portrayed by Lisa Carswell (season 5), Marcus' mother.
- John Haskell, portrayed by John Venable (season 5), Marcus' father.
- Liam, portrayed by Theo Thiedemann (season 5), Aleida's assistant at Helios.
- Yoon Tae-Min, portrayed by Joe Choi (season 5), a refugee living on Mars, whose body Alex finds after he was murdered.
- Leslie Brown, portrayed by Nene Nwoko (season 5), a Mars Peacekeeper.
- Nadya, portrayed by Ella Ayberk (season 5), the receptionist at Kuragin's headquarters on Happy Valley.
- Shane Barnhill, portrayed by Aren Farrington (season 5), a US Navy pilot, who served with Ed Baldwin in the Korean War, whom Ed named his son after.
- Jiang Hua, portrayed by Pamelyn Chee (season 5), the Chinese commander of the ISN's Mars base.
- Ajeet, portrayed by Omi Vaidya (season 5), a Mars resident.
- Major Luke Maxwell, portrayed by Tim Martin Gleason (season 5), the officer in charge of Avery's polygraph tests at Camp Pendleton.
- Semyon Petrikov, portrayed by Artur Zai Barrea (season 5), a Soviet police officer, who interrogated Irina during her time in prison.
- Priya Joshi, portrayed by Anjali Bhimani (season 5), a Helios employee on Mars.
- Lev Andreyevich Bolkonski, portrayed by Leon Mandel (season 5), the CEO of Kuragin.
- Erin Vogel, portrayed by Sprague Grayden (season 5), the Head of Security for Helios on Happy Valley.
- Sorina, portrayed by Michelle Arthur (season 5), the commander of Kosmos-1, Kuragin's Titan mission.
- Sergeant Jon Brickell, portrayed by Justin Cuomo (season 5), an OPEF training officer.
- Ollie, portrayed by CJ Vana (season 5), a Helios worker on Mars, whom Lily interviewed.
- Beth Gadsden, portrayed by Dani Deetté (season 5), a Mars resident, who volunteered to defend the base against the OPEF attack.
- Spencer Thrush, portrayed by Lonzo Liggins (season 5), a Mars resident, who volunteered to defend the base against the OPEF attack.
- Jamie Dalton, portrayed by Kurtis Bedford (season 5), a Mars resident, who volunteered to defend the base against the OPEF attack.

== Historical figures in archive footage ==
=== Presidents of the United States ===
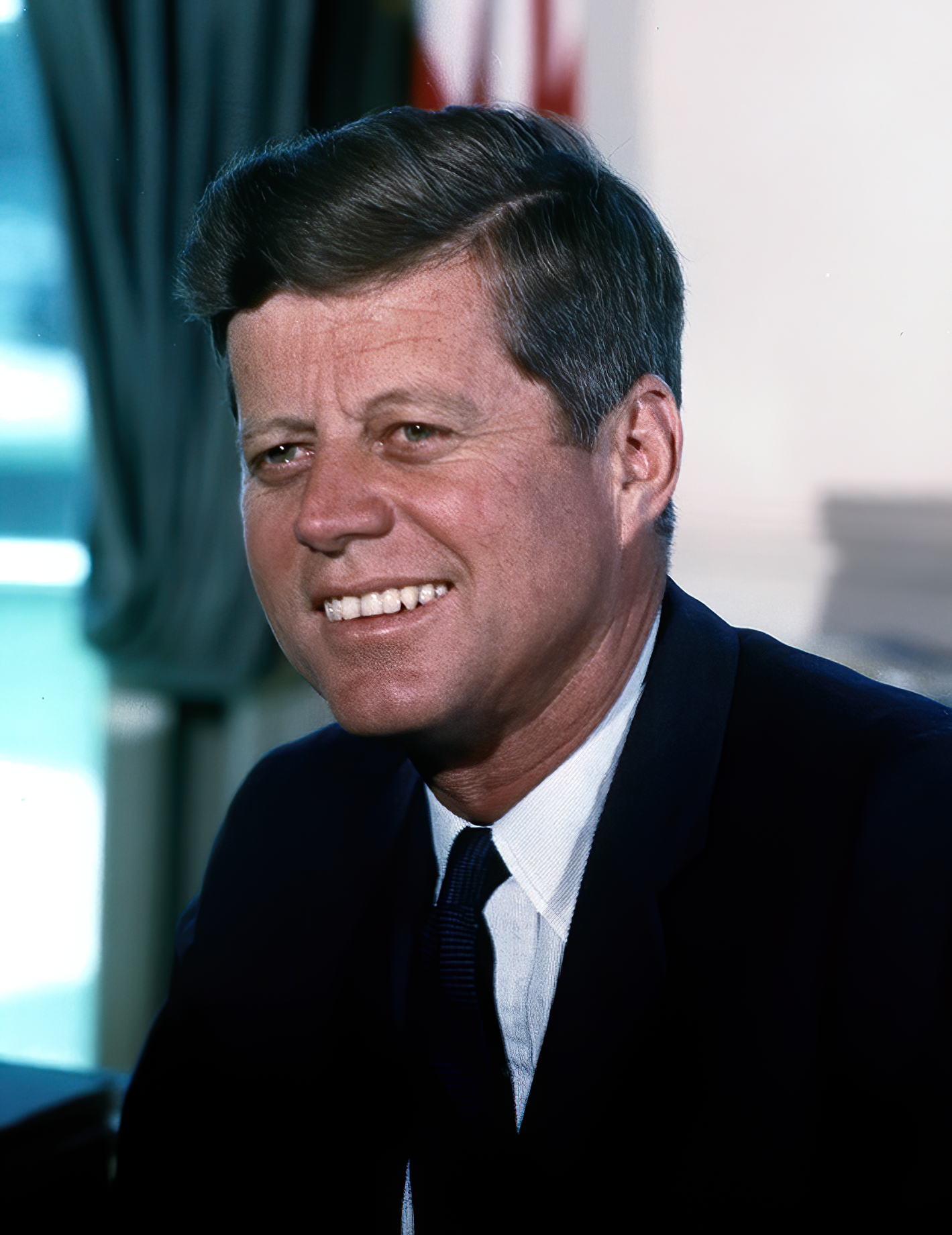
John F. Kennedy (1961–1963)

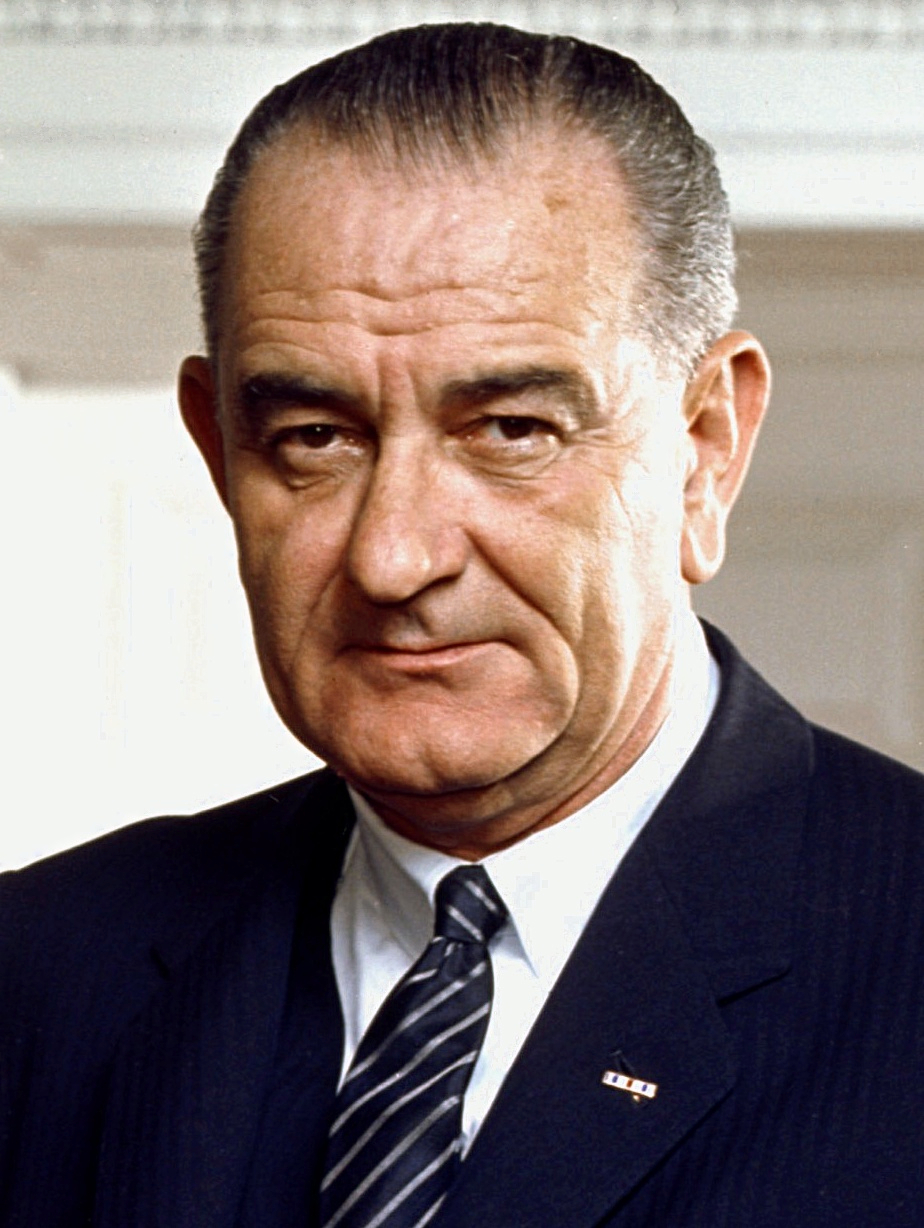
Lyndon B. Johnson (1963–1969)

Richard Nixon (1969–1973)

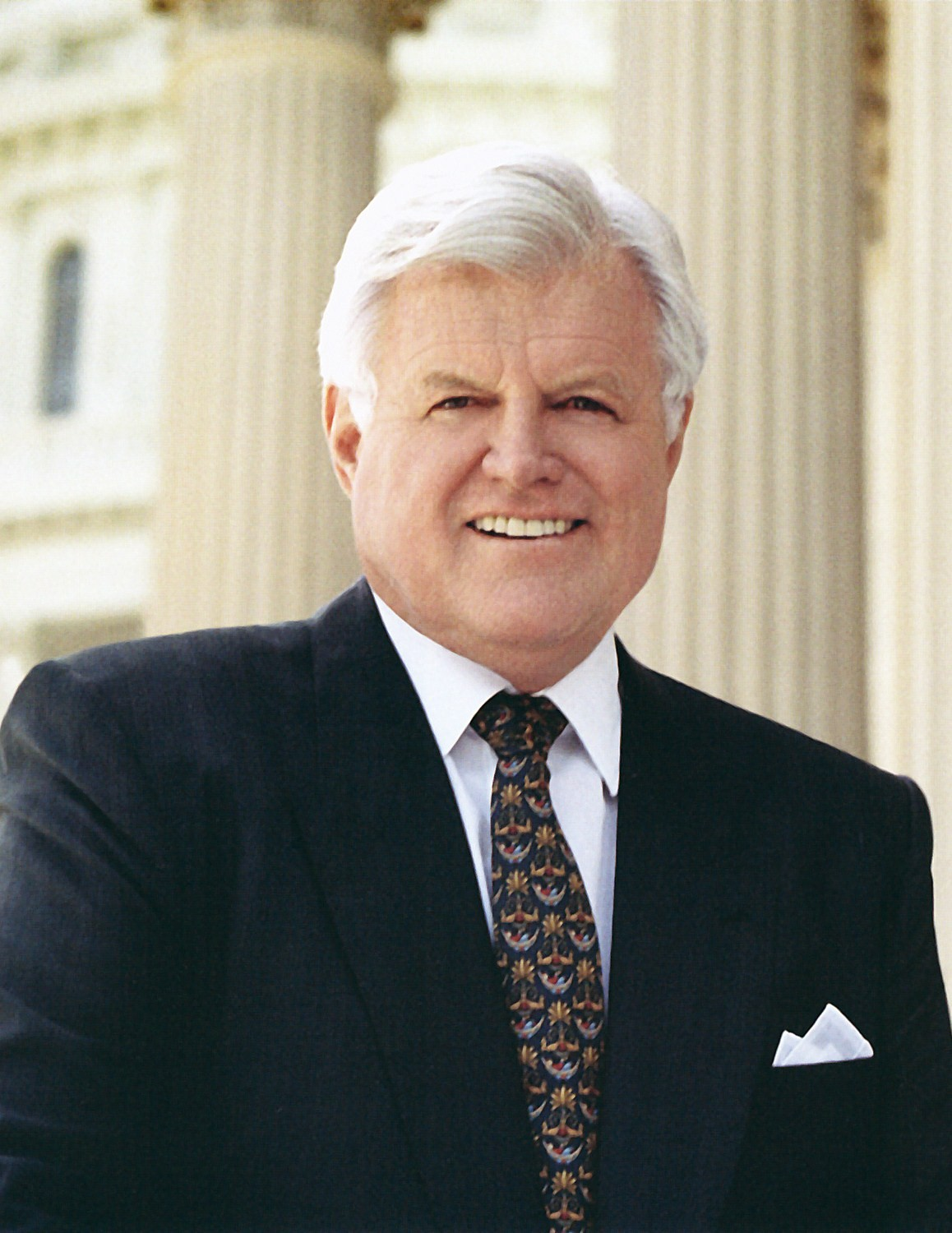
Ted Kennedy (1973–1977)

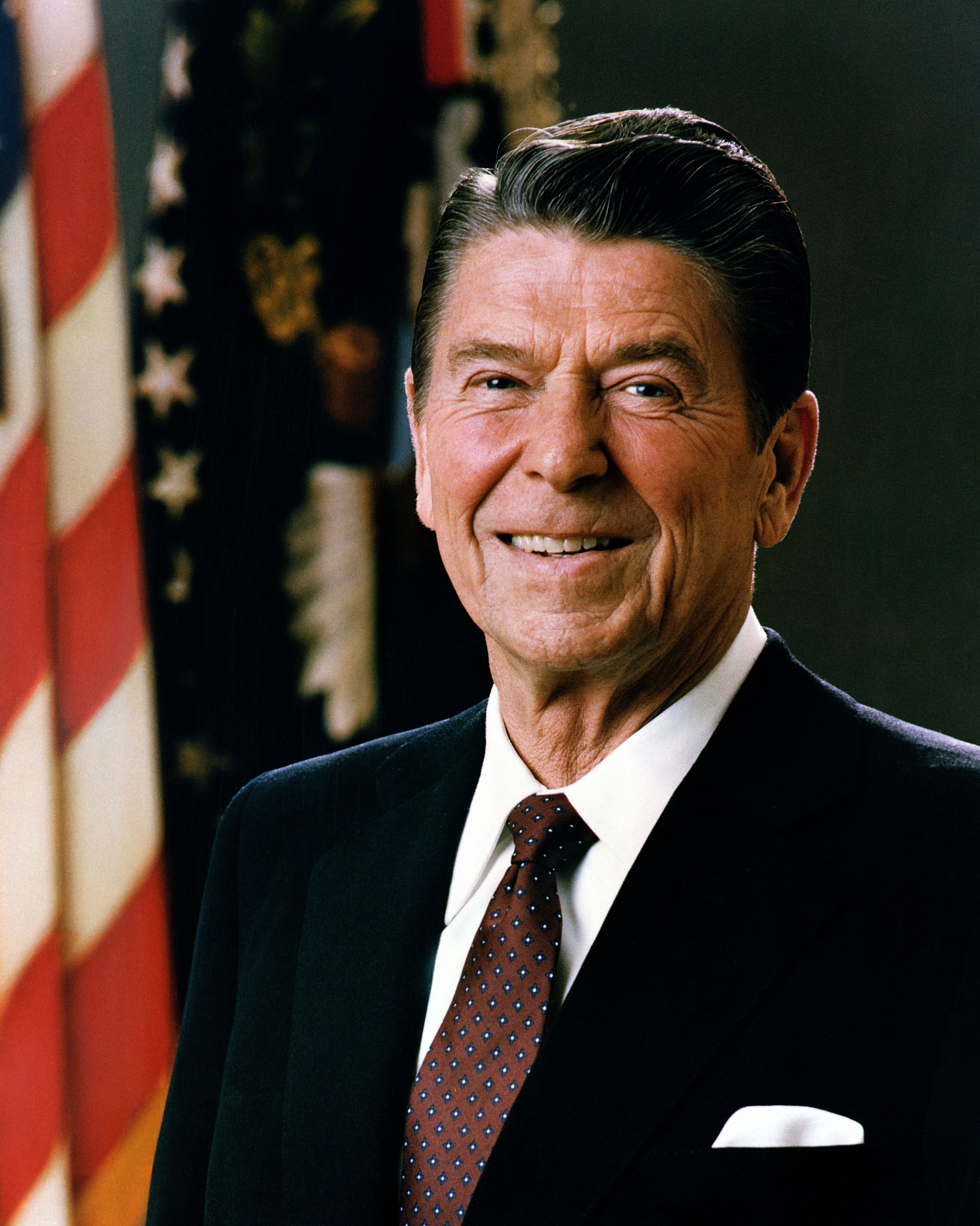
Ronald Reagan (1977–1985)

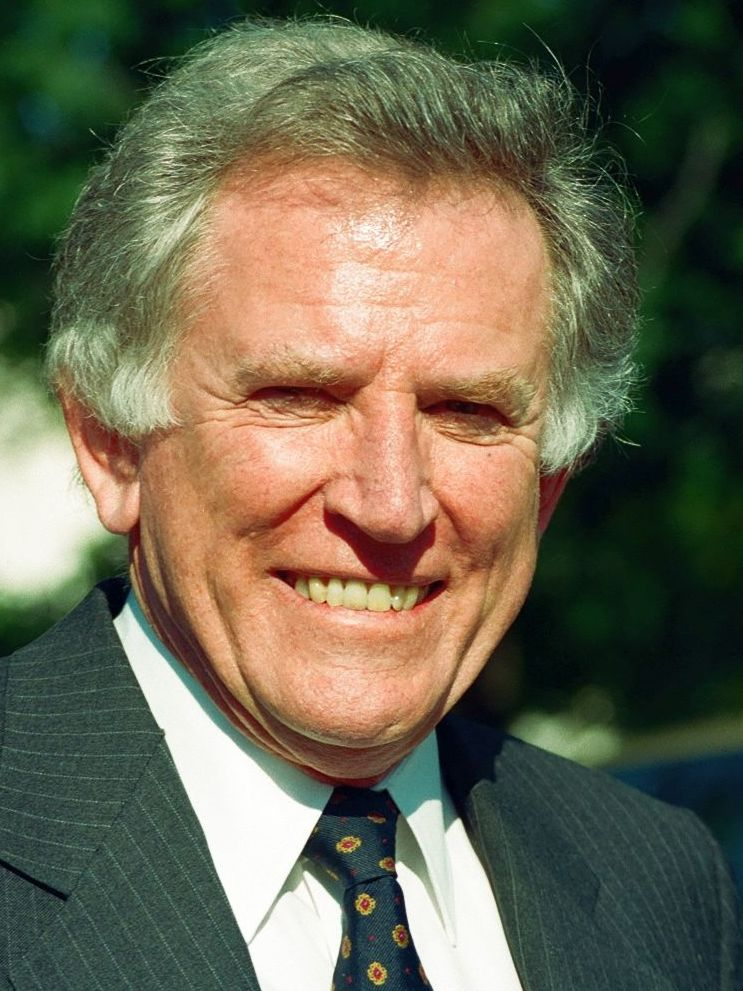
Gary Hart (1985–1993)

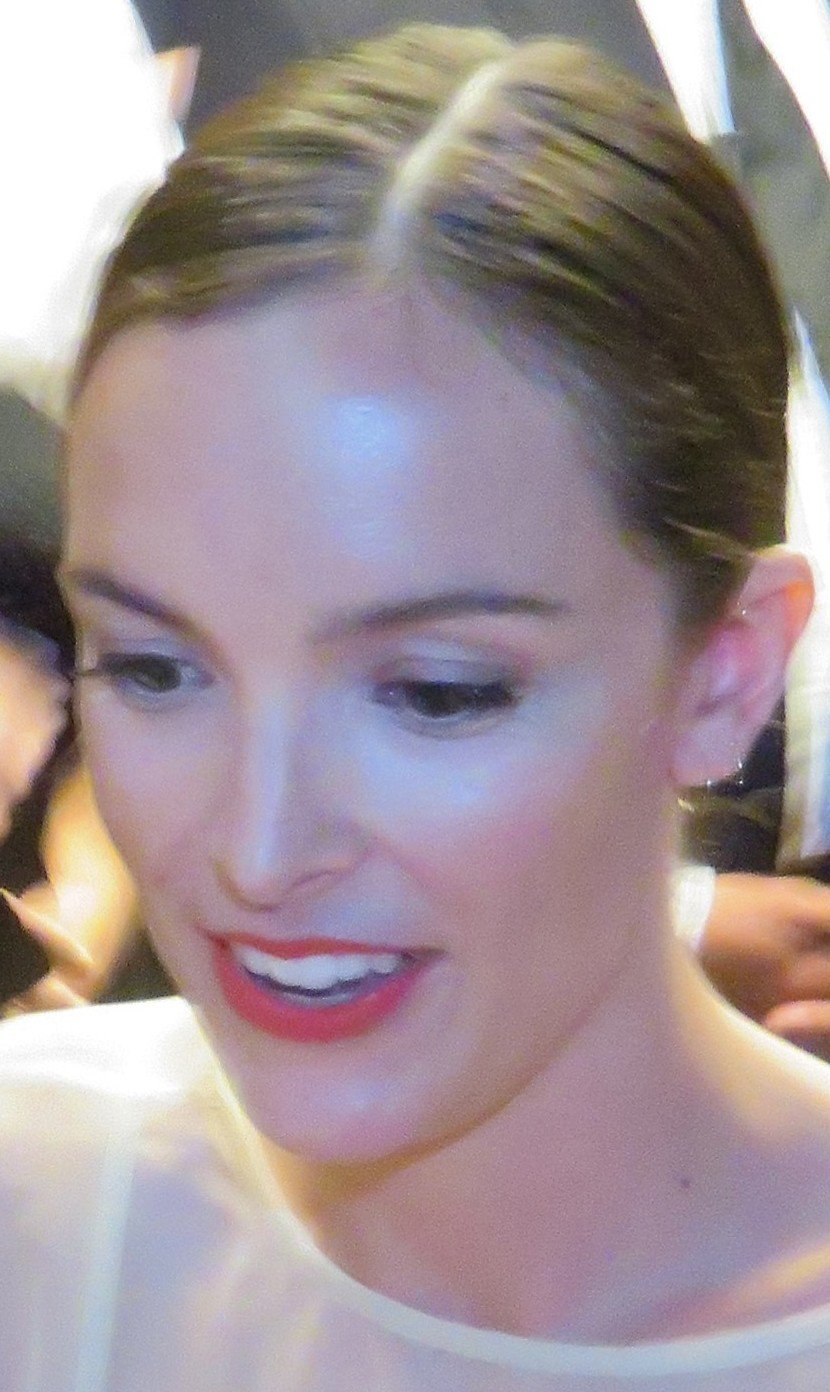
Ellen Wilson (1993–2001)

Al Gore (2001–2005)

Due to the alternate history nature of the show, it features a different timeline of presidents:

- John F. Kennedy (1961–1963)
- Lyndon B. Johnson (1963–1969)
- Richard Nixon (Note: Voiced by Jim Meskimen in altered archival footage.) (1969–1973), losing the 1972 United States presidential election against Ted Kennedy. After cosmonaut Anastasia Belikova became the first woman on the Moon, he demanded that NASA also starts a program featuring women as astronauts who then became known as "Nixon's Women". Out of 20 "Astronaut Candidates", five were elected, namely Tracy Stevens, who was the wife of Apollo 15's Gordo Stevens, two of the last of Mercury 13 named Molly Cobb and Patty Doyle, a black woman named Danielle Poole, who worked as a NASA computer and Ellen Waverly.
- Ted Kennedy (1973–1977), winning the 1972 election against Nixon, but then losing the 1976 election against Ronald Reagan.
- Ronald Reagan (Note: Voiced by Jeff Bergman in altered archival footage.) (1977–1985), winning the 1976 election against Kennedy and the 1980 election against Senator Robert Money.
- Gary Hart (Note: Voiced by Jon Briddell in altered archival footage.) (1985–1993), winning the 1984 election against Richard Schweiker and the 1988 election against Pat Robertson.
- Ellen Wilson (1993–2001), winning the 1992 election against Bill Clinton and the 1996 election against Jerry Brown.
- Al Gore (Note: Voiced by Ron McClary in altered archival footage.) (2001–2005), winning the 2000 election against George H. W. Bush, but then losing the 2004 election against Jim Bragg.
- Jim Bragg (2005–), winning the 2004 election against Al Gore, previously vice-president under president Ellen Wilson from 1993 to 1997.

Comparison of the timeline of presidents
Term	Real life president	Alternate timeline president
1961–1965	John F. Kennedy (1961–1963)	John F. Kennedy (1961–1963)
1961–1965	Lyndon B. Johnson (1963–1965)	Lyndon B. Johnson (1963–1965)
1965–1969	Lyndon B. Johnson	Lyndon B. Johnson
1969–1973	Richard Nixon	Richard Nixon
1973–1977	Richard Nixon (1973–1974)	Ted Kennedy
1973–1977	Gerald Ford (1974–1977)	Ted Kennedy
1977–1981	Jimmy Carter	Ronald Reagan
1981–1985	Ronald Reagan	Ronald Reagan
1985–1989	Ronald Reagan	Gary Hart
1989–1993	George H. W. Bush	Gary Hart
1993–1997	Bill Clinton	Ellen Wilson
1997–2001	Bill Clinton	Ellen Wilson
2001–2005	George W. Bush	Al Gore
2005–2009	George W. Bush	Jim Bragg
2009–2013	Barack Obama	Jim Bragg

=== Full list ===
Name	Description
Yuri Andropov	The president of the Soviet Union from 1982 to 1984
Frank Borman	Apollo 8 commander
Tom Brokaw	Television journalist
Scott Carpenter	Mercury Seven astronaut
Johnny Carson	Television host
Jimmy Carter	American governor and senator for Georgia, never having been elected to the presidency.
Don Cheadle	American actor who portrayed Dev Ayesa in the film Race to Mars
Bill Clinton	The Democratic candidate for the 1992 presidential election, losing to Ellen Wilson
Hillary Clinton	Wife of Bill Clinton who divorced in the 1990s
Kurt Cobain	Musician and lead vocalist of Nirvana
Gordon Cooper	Mercury Seven astronaut
Walter Cronkite	Journalist
Ellen DeGeneres	American sitcom star whose program was renewed in the 1990s
Clint Eastwood	American actor and filmmaker who portrayed Ed Baldwin in the film Race to Mars
Yuri Gagarin	Cosmonaut and the first human in space
Mikhail Gorbachev	The President of the Soviet Union from 1986
Al Gore	The U.S. president from 2001
Gus Grissom	Mercury Seven astronaut
Gary Hart	The U.S. president from 1985 to 1993
Lyndon B. Johnson	The U.S. president from 1963 to 1969
John F. Kennedy	The U.S. president from 1961 to 1963
Ted Kennedy	The U.S. president from 1973 to 1977
Nikita Khrushchev	Soviet politician
Jeane Kirkpatrick	American political analyst, serving under Ronald Reagan
Henry Kissinger	American politician
Stanley Kubrick	American filmmaker who died weeks before the premiere of his film A.I. Artificial Intelligence in 1999
Tom Lehrer	Musician who wrote a satirical song about Wernher von Braun and his ties to Nazi Germany
John Lennon	Musician, surviving the murder attempt by Mark David Chapman in 1980, which leads to the Beatles reuniting in 1987, and Lennon performing at the half-time show of Super Bowl XXXVI in 2002
Alexei Leonov	A cosmonaut who becomes the first man on the Moon
Jim Lovell	Apollo 8 command module pilot
Diego Maradona	Argentine footballer whose "Hand of God" move led to the loss of the Argentine football team to England in the 1986 FIFA World Cup
John McCain	Arizona Republican who was mulled as a potential running mate for Ellen Wilson
Richard Nixon	The U.S. president from 1969 to 1973
Pope John Paul II	The Pope from 1978, until he is assassinated in St. Peter's square by Mehmet Ali Ağca
Pope Paul VI	The Pope from 1963 to 1978
Jada Pinkett	American actress who portrayed Danielle Poole in the film Race to Mars
Jonathan Pollard	A former intelligence analyst and spy for Israel
Dennis Quaid	American actor who portrayed Gordo Stevens in a film about his sacrifice, titled Love in the Skies in 1990
Ronald Reagan	The U.S. president from 1977 to 1985
Meg Ryan	American actress who portrayed Tracy Stevens in a film about her sacrifice, titled Love in the Skies in 1990
Pat Sajak	Television host
Wally Schirra	Mercury Seven astronaut
Richard Schweiker	The U.S. vice president under Ronald Reagan from 1977 to 1985 and presidential candidate in the 1984 election
Alan Shepard	Mercury Seven astronaut
George Shultz	American businessman
Margaret Thatcher	Prime Minister of the United Kingdom until she is killed by the Provisional IRA in the 1984 Brighton hotel bombing
Mike Tyson	American boxer and media personality who was disgraced in the 1990s
Alex Trebek	Host of the American game show Jeopardy!
Oleg Troyanovsky	Soviet ambassador
Donald Trump	American businessman, who invests into the Soviet economy in the 1980s
Sigourney Weaver	Actress, portraying Ellen Ripley in the Alien franchise
Harvey Weinstein	American film producer who is arrested earlier than in our timeline for sexual offenses
Vanna White	Hostess of the American game show Wheel of Fortune
