= Jaeden Martell =

American actor (born 2003)

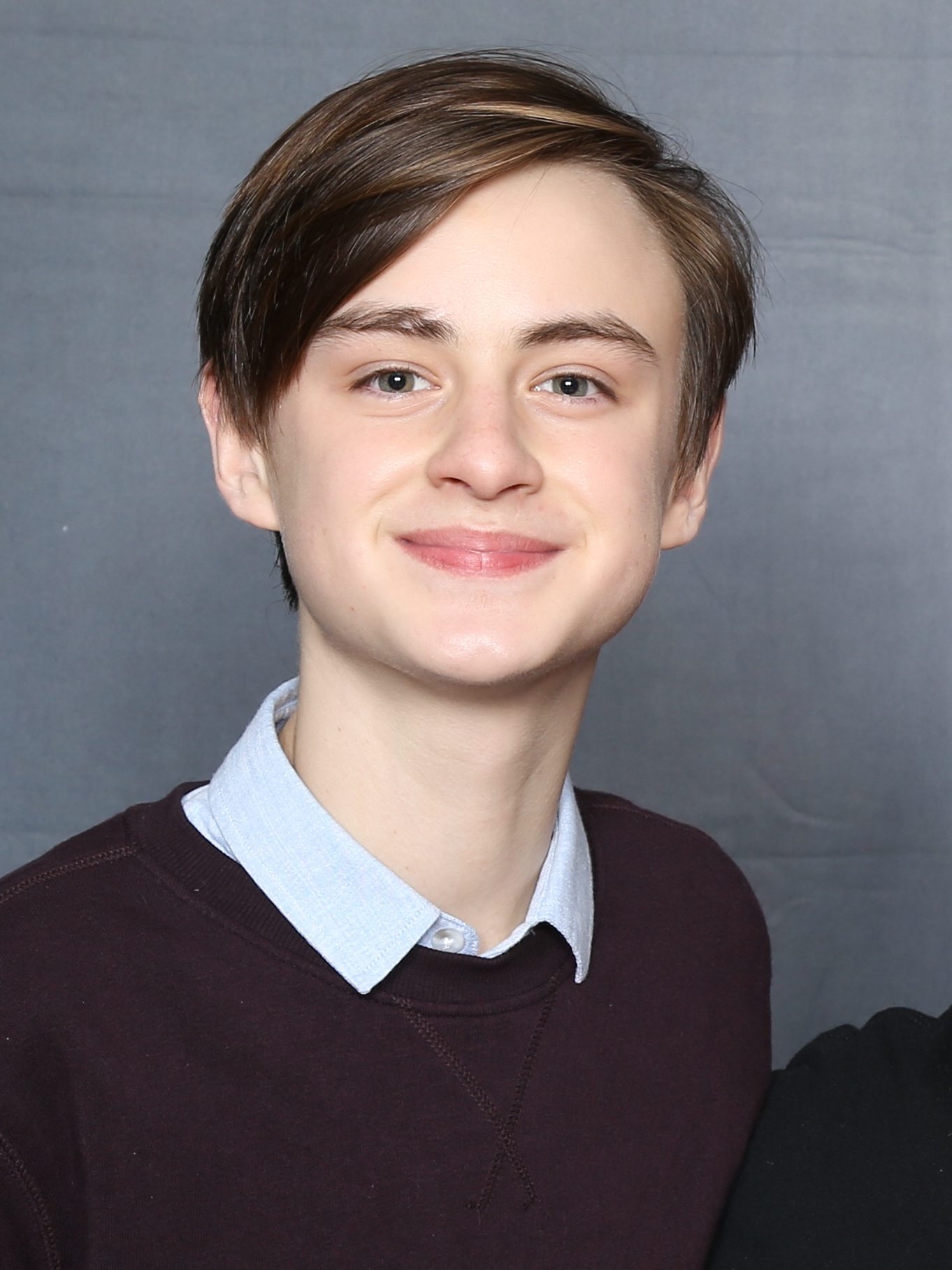
- Martell in 2018
- Born: Jaeden Lieberher; January 4, 2003 (age 23); Philadelphia, Pennsylvania, U.S.
- Occupation: Actor
- Years active: 2013–present
- Father: Wes Lieberher

Jaeden Martell (né Lieberher; born January 4, 2003) is an American actor. He began his career as a child actor, with roles in the comedy drama St. Vincent (2014) and science fiction film Midnight Special (2016). His performance in St. Vincent earned him a nomination for the Critics' Choice Movie Award for Best Young Performer. After playing the title character in the drama The Book of Henry (2017), Martell's breakthrough came with his portrayal of Bill Denbrough in the supernatural horror films It (2017) and It Chapter Two (2019). This led to further leading roles in horror films, such as The Lodge (2019) and Mr. Harrigan's Phone (2022).

Martell had a supporting role in Rian Johnson's mystery comedy Knives Out (2019). Venturing into projects with more mature themes, he played a reserved teenager accused of murder in the Apple TV miniseries Defending Jacob (2020). He has since starred in the comedy films Metal Lords (2022) and Y2K (2024).

== Early life ==
Martell was born on January 4, 2003, in Philadelphia, Pennsylvania, the son of Wes Lieberher, a Los Angeles–based executive chef, and Angela Teresa Martell. His maternal grandmother, Chisun Martell, is Korean. He lived in South Philadelphia until the age of eight when he moved to Los Angeles.

== Career ==
=== Early work (2014–2016) ===
In the first six years of his career, Martell was credited almost exclusively under his paternal family name, Lieberher. In 2019, he switched to his mother's surname, Martell.

Martell's first acting role was in a commercial for Hot Wheels. He appeared in several other commercials after that, including Google, Moneysupermarket.com, Liberty Mutual, Hyundai (for the 2013 Super Bowl), Verizon Fios and General Electric. His first major feature film role was in 2014's St. Vincent, where he starred alongside Bill Murray. Martell garnered a nomination for the Critics' Choice Movie Award for Best Young Performer for his role in the film.

In 2015, Martell appeared in Cameron Crowe's comedy drama Aloha, after Murray had recommended him to Crowe for the role. His next two films, the science fiction film Midnight Special and the independent comedy The Confirmation, followed in 2016. Midnight Special stars Martell as a boy who is on the run with his father from the government and a cult after it is discovered that he possesses special powers.

=== It and breakthrough (2017–present) ===
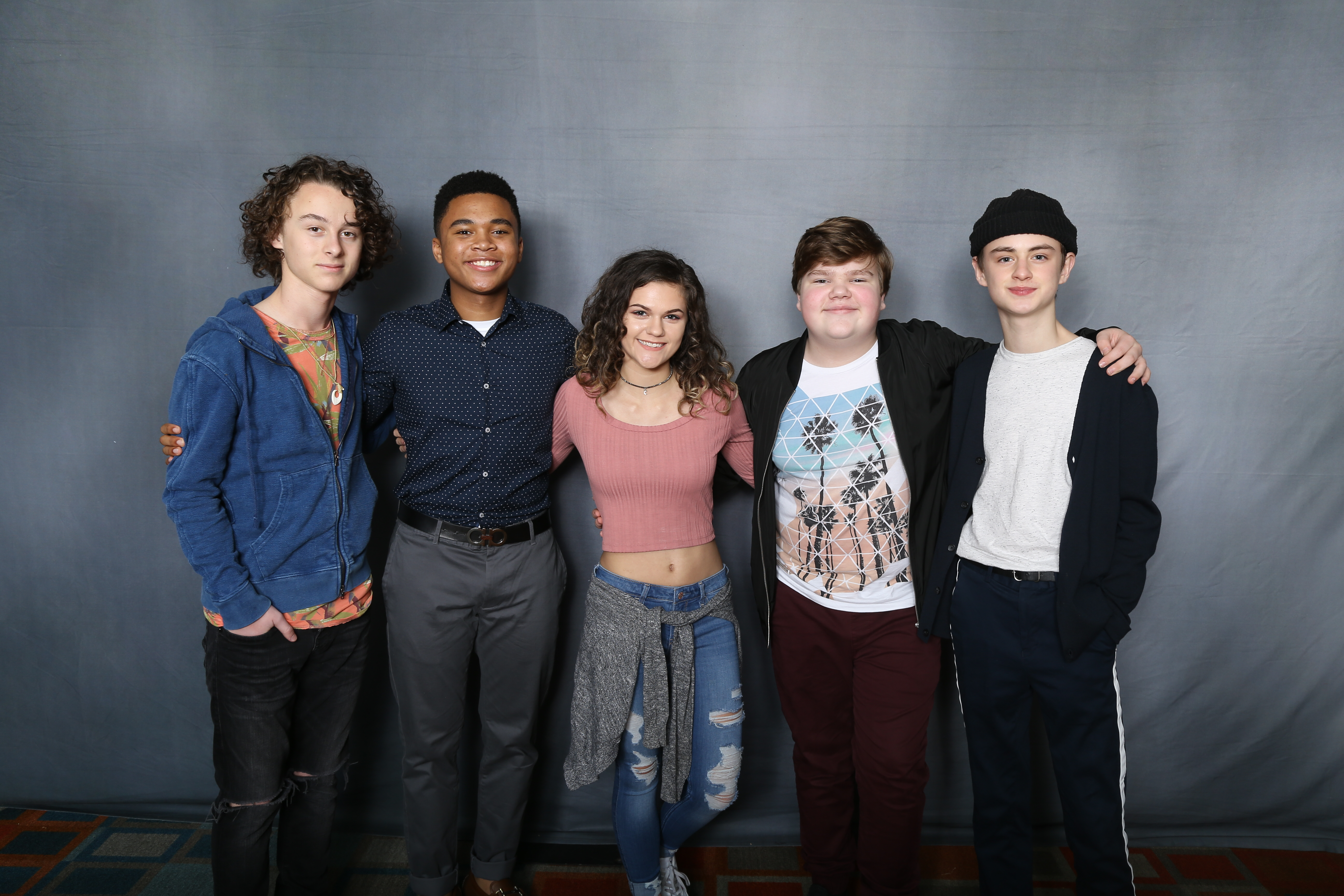
Martell (far right) with some of his It costars at the 2018 Paradise City Comic Con

Martell's first film of 2017 was the thriller drama The Book of Henry, playing Henry. While the film premiered to negative reviews from critics, Martell received some positive notices for his acting. His next role that year was as Bill Denbrough in the supernatural horror film It, which premiered to positive critical reviews and grossed over $701 million in the box office, marking Martell's first major commercial success. He reprised his role as Bill in the 2019 sequel It Chapter Two, marking another commercial success with over $473 million in box office receipts, despite mixed critical reviews.

Alongside It Chapter Two, Martell had four more releases in 2019. His first that year was the horror film The Lodge. His next two films that year were the drama Low Tide and the coming of age fantasy The True Adventures of Wolfboy. His final release of 2019, after It, was Rian Johnson's murder mystery comedy film Knives Out, with Martell playing Jacob Thrombey, a white supremacist child.

In March 2019, Martell joined the cast of the Apple TV+ miniseries Defending Jacob, based on the 2012 novel byWilliam Landay. Also in 2020, it was confirmed by Martell that he was in pre-production for Tunnels, playing the younger siblings of a gun violence victim; however, as of 2024, the film has not yet garnered a release date.

In September 2021, Martell portrayed Morty Smith in a series of promotional interstitials for the two-part fifth season finale of Rick and Morty. In February 2021, he joined the cast of Netflix's Metal Lords. In October 2022, he portrayed Craig in the Netflix film Mr. Harrigan's Phone written and directed by John Lee Hancock, based on the Stephen King short story from the If It Bleeds collection. In 2023, he was cast in the A24 film Y2K.

== Filmography ==
=== Film ===
Film
Year	Title	Role	Notes
2014	St. Vincent	Oliver Bronstein	
2014	Playing It Cool	6-year-old Me	
2015	Aloha	Mitchell Woodside	
2016	Midnight Special	Alton Meyer	
2016	The Confirmation	Anthony	
2017	The Book of Henry	Henry Carpenter	
2017	It	Bill Denbrough	
2019	The Lodge	Aidan Hall	
2019	Low Tide	Peter	
2019	The True Adventures of Wolfboy	Paul	
2019	It Chapter Two	Young Bill Denbrough	
2019	Knives Out	Jacob Thrombey	
2022	Metal Lords	Kevin Schlieb	
2022	Mr. Harrigan's Phone	Craig Poole	
2024	Arcadian	Joseph	
2024	Y2K	Eli Lillard	
2025	Our Hero, Balthazar	Balthazar	Also producer
TBA	The Boy in the Iron Box	Boy	Post-production
TBA	Preppy		Filming

=== Television ===
Television
Year	Title	Role	Notes
2015	American Dad!	Peter Junior (voice)	Episode: "My Affair Lady"
2015–2016	Masters of Sex	Johnny Masters	Recurring role (seasons 3–4)
2020	Defending Jacob	Jacob Barber	Main role
2021	Calls	Justin	Episode: "Mom"
2023	Barry	John Berkman (older)	Episode: "wow"

=== Other ===
Other
Year	Title	Role	Notes
2021	Rick and Morty	Morty Smith	Promotional campaigns

== Awards and nominations ==
Awards and nominations for Jaeden Martell
Year	Award	Category	Work	Result	Ref.
2014	Las Vegas Film Critics Society Awards	Youth in Film	St. Vincent	Won	
2014	Phoenix Film Critics Society Awards	Best Performance by a Youth in a Lead or Supporting Role – Male	St. Vincent	Won	
2014	Washington D.C. Area Film Critics Association	Best Youth Performance	St. Vincent	Nominated	
2015	Critics' Choice Movie Awards	Best Young Actor/Actress	St. Vincent	Nominated	
2015	Online Film & Television Association	Best Youth Performance	St. Vincent	Nominated	
2018	MTV Movie & TV Awards	Best On-Screen Team (with Sophia Lillis, Jack Dylan Grazer, Wyatt Oleff, Jeremy Ray Taylor, Chosen Jacobs and Finn Wolfhard)	It	Won	
