= Defending Jacob (miniseries) =

2020 drama miniseries

- Created by: Mark Bomback
- Based on: Defending Jacob by William Landay
- Screenplay by: Mark Bomback
- Directed by: Morten Tyldum
- Starring: Chris Evans; Michelle Dockery; Jaeden Martell; Cherry Jones; Pablo Schreiber; Betty Gabriel; Sakina Jaffrey; J.K. Simmons
- Theme music composer: Ólafur Arnalds
- Composer: Atli Örvarsson
- Country of origin: United States
- Original language: English
- No. of episodes: 8

Production
- Executive producers: Mark Bomback; Chris Evans; Morten Tyldum; Rosalie Swedlin; Adam Shulman
- Cinematography: Jonathan Freeman
- Running time: 45–65 minutes
- Production companies: Mimir Films; Mark Bomback Productions; Paramount Television Studios; Anonymous Content

Original release
- Network: Apple TV
- Release: April 24 – May 29, 2020

Defending Jacob is an American murder-mystery legal drama miniseries, based on the 2012 novel of the same name by William Landay, produced by Apple TV. The series was created and written by Mark Bomback and directed by Morten Tyldum. It stars Chris Evans, Michelle Dockery, Jaeden Martell, Cherry Jones, Pablo Schreiber, Betty Gabriel, Sakina Jaffrey and J.K. Simmons. It premiered on April 24, 2020, and concluded on May 29, 2020.

The series received generally favorable reviews from critics, who praised the performances (particularly those of Evans, Dockery and Martell), ambiguity, and emotional weight, but criticized the pacing, length and ending. The miniseries was released on Blu-ray and DVD on July 6, 2021, by Paramount Home Entertainment.

== Premise ==
Assistant District Attorney Andy Barber and his wife Laurie deal with the accusation that their 14-year-old son Jacob may be a murderer.

== Cast ==
=== Main ===
- Chris Evans as Andy Barber
- Michelle Dockery as Laurie Barber
- Jaeden Martell as Jacob Barber
- Cherry Jones as Joanna Klein
- Pablo Schreiber as Neal Logiudice
- Betty Gabriel as Pam Duffy
- Sakina Jaffrey as Lynn Canavan
- J. K. Simmons as William "Bloody Billy" Barber

=== Recurring ===
- Daniel Henshall as Leonard Patz
- Tamara Hickey as Toby
- Ben Taylor as Derek Yoo
- Jordan Alexa Davis as Sarah Grohl
- Megan Byrne as Joan Rifkin
- Christopher Buckner as Young William "Bloody Billy" Barber (flashbacks)
- Patrick Fischler as Dan Rifkin
- Poorna Jagannathan as Dr. Vogel
- Lizzie Short as Marianne Barber (flashbacks)
- Evan Risser as Young Andy Barber (flashbacks)
- William Xifaras as Father James O’Leary
- Lenny Clarke as Food Truck Guy
- Michelle D. Violette as Paula Gianetto

== Episodes ==
| No. | Title | Directed by | Teleplay by | Original release date |
|---|---|---|---|---|
| 1 | "Pilot" | Morten Tyldum | Mark Bomback | April 24, 2020 |
Assistant District Attorney Neal Loguidice questions Andy Barber before a grand jury. Months earlier, Andy is himself a respected ADA and lives a content, suburban life with his wife Laurie and their 14-year old son Jacob in Newton, Massachusetts. When a classmate of Jacob's, Ben Rifkin, is found stabbed to death in the park near their middle school, Andy is assigned the case over Loguidice's objections that Andy's presence could present a conflict of interest. Andy and Detective Pam Duffy question students at the school, but are unable to discern a motive for the murder. While questioning Jacob privately about Ben, Jacob tells Andy and Laurie that Ben was unlikable and later expresses frustration to Andy over the exaggerated false sympathy from his classmates over Ben's death. Duffy discovers a possible suspect, Leonard Patz, a convicted sexual predator, but Andy is advised against bringing him in until they find solid evidence. That night, Andy discovers an online message board memorializing Ben and becomes disturbed after reading a series of comments, including one from Jacob's friend Derek, accusing Jacob of murdering Ben. Andy searches Jacob's room and finds a knife fitting the description of the murder weapon hidden in a sock in his drawer.
| 2 | "Everything Is Cool" | Morten Tyldum | Mark Bomback | April 24, 2020 |
Andy and Laurie confront Jacob about the knife and message board. Jacob insists he never used the knife and that the comments are meaningless. Andy disposes of the knife. The police bring in Leonard Patz for questioning but are unable to implicate him in the murder and he is released. A short time later, District Attorney Lynn Canavan tells Andy that the lone fingerprint found on Ben's body belongs to Jacob and that Jacob has become the prime suspect in the case. Canavan informs Andy that he has been removed from the case and Andy becomes upset when he learns that Loguidice has been assigned to prosecute in his place. The police obtain a search warrant and search the Barber home. On the way home from school, Jacob sees police outside the house and, clearly spooked, runs away. When eventually found by a police officer, he insists that he is innocent, but reveals that he found Ben's body the morning of his death and didn't tell anyone as he was afraid he would get blamed for it. Andy and Laurie learn that Jacob will be held overnight in jail before his arraignment the following morning. Meanwhile at a diner, Leonard Patz looks through a photo album on his phone that is filled with photos of Ben Rifkin before deleting them.
| 3 | "Poker Faces" | Morten Tyldum | Mark Bomback | April 24, 2020 |
Andy and Laurie hire Joanna Klein, a colleague of Andy's and an experienced defense lawyer, to represent Jacob, and Jacob is allowed to go home on bail. Andy and Laurie restrict Jacob from accessing social media to keep him away from the media's coverage of the case. Andy is haunted by flashbacks of his childhood and reveals to Laurie that his father, whom Andy has said abandoned his family when Andy was only a baby, is in fact a convicted murderer. Laurie begins to crack under the weight of the case: she is sent home on temporary leave from her job as director of a children's home, their garage is vandalized, and her best friend cuts off contact with her. Without telling Andy, she researches his father’s murder conviction, and has old newspaper clippings about the case delivered to the house under a pseudonym. Andy, insistent that Leonard Patz is the true suspect, convinces Duffy to send him Patz's file. Joanna sends Laurie and Andy to Dr. Vogel, a psychiatrist specializing in behavioral science and genetics, to prepare them for the chance the prosecution may use the so-called "murder gene" as an argument. While Andy remembers Jacob as a normally behaved child, Laurie recalls that Jacob was difficult and sometimes aggressive toward his parents and other children; Andy is upset that Laurie would imply Jacob is capable of violence, but Laurie insists she does not doubt Jacob's innocence. Sarah, one of Jacob's classmates, calls Detective Duffy and tells her that she has information on Ben's murder.
| 4 | "Damage Control" | Morten Tyldum | Mark Bomback | May 1, 2020 |
Andy visits the home of a teenager, Matt, who accused Leonard Patz of sexually assaulting him. Andy attempts to question Matt but the visit turns confrontational and Matt's defensive behaviour leads Andy to believe he's hiding something. Later, Andy follows Patz to his apartment and takes note of his address. At home, Andy is pleased to find Sarah visiting Jacob; later that night, Jacob tells him that Sarah believes Derek killed Ben and that the police conducted a second interview with Derek. Privately, Jacob creates a secret Instagram account despite his parents' rules banning him from social media. Meanwhile, Laurie is becoming increasingly unstable, spying on her former coworkers and lying to Andy about having dinner with a friend when she actually ate alone at a diner. At the diner, she is approached by a friendly woman whom she confides in; when the woman reveals herself to be a freelance writer working on a story for The Boston Globe's Sunday Magazine, Laurie leaves in a panic without insisting her comments were given off the record and does not tell Andy about the incident. Dr. Vogel conducts multiple tests to determine any psychopathic tendencies in Jacob and takes a DNA sample from Andy. Dr. Vogel reveals that they also need a DNA sample from Andy's father, but that he will only provide a sample if Andy obtains it himself. Andy, despite his anger and fear of his father, agrees.
| 5 | "Visitors" | Morten Tyldum | Mark Bomback | May 8, 2020 |
Andy visits his father Billy in prison. Andy is hostile towards Billy, and when he refuses to help him reduce his sentence, Billy refuses to give the DNA sample. The article in the Sunday Globe Magazine featuring Laurie’s comments about her family’s isolation is published and Laurie encounters Ben's mother soon afterward while grocery shopping. Ben’s mother spits in Laurie's face upon seeing her grocery cart full of Fourth of July snacks. Laurie confides in Dr. Vogel a moment in Jacob's childhood where he attempted to hit a boy with a bowling ball but was stopped by Laurie, and Dr. Vogel encourages Laurie to seek help for her emotional struggles. Andy confronts Derek, who tells him Jacob is into "cutter porn” and that there's a lot Andy doesn't know about his son. Andy also speaks to Sarah, who confides that she sometimes messaged Ben at night, and that he later pressured her into sending him a nude selfie; Ben further told Sarah he would leak the picture if she didn't perform oral sex on him. Sarah reveals that Derek stole Ben's phone in a gesture to delete the nude selfie but Sarah became angry at Derek and refused to take the phone, only to learn two days later that Ben had been found dead with his phone still missing. Andy relays this information to Joanna, Laurie, and Jacob and, feeling betrayed, Jacob becomes angry with Sarah, believing she only spent time with him out of guilt. He shuns Sarah when she initiates contact. The next day, Andy and Jacob go fishing, and Jacob tells Andy that he’s scared he’ll go to jail. Andy later receives a call from Joanna who discloses news about Ben’s phone and Andy’s dad having changed his mind about the DNA test. Andy deduces that Laurie persuaded his father to submit to the DNA test. Andy also receives a series of late night hang-up calls from Matt, who does not speak but appears to want to.
| 6 | "Wishful Thinking" | Morten Tyldum | Mark Bomback | May 15, 2020 |
Joanna gains access to Ben's phone, but she and Andy find no evidence. Loguidice also makes a snide remark about Andy's father, causing him to angrily push Loguidice against the wall. Detective Duffy warns Andy that Loguidice is expressing every confidence that the prosecution will win the case against Jacob. Joanna and Andy become aware of Jacob’s online activities, including joking about being a 'psycho'. Andy angrily confronts Jacob in front of Laurie and Jacob deletes the Instagram account. While in the prison rec room, Andy’s father sees a news item comparing Jacob, Andy, and himself. That night, a strange blue car loiters outside the Barber house, troubling Andy and Laurie, and Andy receives another call from Matt, who asks to meet. Andy arranges for Matt to tell Joanna and the prosecution more about what happened between Matt and Patz, and Matt reveals that Patz expressed interest in Ben and spoke to the boy in the park on a few occasions. Loguidice believes the story to be too convenient, but a search warrant is issued on Patz's house. Andy receives a call from his father in prison, and Andy and Laurie meet with Dr. Vogel, who reveals that Jacob tested negative for the "murder gene" (Andy and Billy tested positive) and that the mutation is actually inherited through the mother. However, all three Barbers tested positive for a violence-inducing receptor as well and that Jacob's ability to feel empathy may be compromised, information that troubles Laurie. Andy confronts the man in the blue car with a crowbar, telling him to stay away. The next morning, Andy, Laurie, and Jacob leave for the first day of the trial.
| 7 | "Job" | Morten Tyldum | Mark Bomback | May 22, 2020 |
The trial begins, with Andy appearing as Joanna's second chair, and the judge ordering that any mention of Andy's father is off-limits. After the first day of the trial, the man in the blue car is seen by Andy, and Detective Duffy gets him to hand over ID, revealing him as former mob "muscle" who goes by Father O'Leary. Sarah and Jacob resume exchanging messages and the trial continues, Loguidice soon irritates the judge by placing too much focus on Andy, bringing out a knife that may have been the same model as Jacob's missing knife, and using Andy's outburst against Loguidice in the courthouse as a way to bring Detective Duffy on the stand and admit that Andy's father is in prison. On day four, Joanna receives news that Matt has fled the state and will not testify. Loguidice brings Derek to the stand, who reads a story written by Jacob fantasizing Ben's murder. Andy and Laurie talk that night and it becomes clear that while Laurie believes Jacob is confessing to Ben's murder, Andy believes Jacob is simply fantasizing about the crime as every detail in Jacob's story was revealed on the news. That night, Patz writes a letter on the back of the subpoena ordering him to testify, confessing to Ben's murder.
| 8 | "After" | Morten Tyldum | Mark Bomback | May 29, 2020 |
The next morning, Joanna tells Andy that Patz confessed before killing himself. Jacob's case is dismissed. In the parking lot, Ben's father angrily approaches the Barbers but is beaten up by O'Leary, revealing himself to be a friend of Billy's. Feeling unwelcome in Newton, the Barbers plan to move to Colorado and Laurie feels guilty for believing that Jacob killed Ben. Andy meets with his former boss Canavan, who tells Andy that the Patz case was finally closed due to things not "adding up". Andy, seeing the crowbar he threatened O'Leary with, visits Billy in prison, where he deduces that Billy hired O'Leary to force Patz's confession to free Jacob, actions that are revealed to the audience through flashbacks. The Barbers take their planned vacation to Mexico, where Jacob hits it off with a girl named Hope. He goes to a party with her but leaves early and the next morning, he is confronted when it appears Hope has gone missing. Shaken and struggling with the possibility that his father had Patz killed, Andy reveals to Laurie that he believes Billy had Patz killed, throwing her into another tailspin of doubt and suspicion. Hope is found alive, but the Barbers leave Mexico early and return to Newton where they prepare to make a move and start over. Laurie becomes increasingly distraught over her own troubled thoughts, worrying both Andy and Jacob. She later takes Jacob to get a haircut and Andy finds that she has thrown away scrapbooks of Jacob's baby photos. Andy tries to call Laurie who is speeding in the rain and confronting Jacob about Ben’s murder. Frightened, Jacob repeatedly denies the crime but then switches, agreeing that he killed Ben if saying so will make Laurie slow down. He begs Laurie to slow down but Laurie, lamenting that she genuinely cannot tell if her son is capable of murder and that she will never know the truth, drives the car into an overpass. It is then revealed that the grand jury testimony framing the story is for Laurie, not Jacob, and that Loguidice is attempting to prove Laurie caused the accident intentionally, insisting that the Commonwealth of Massachusetts wants justice for Jacob. Andy, not knowing the truth about Laurie’s intentions that day, maintains that the crash was an accident and Laurie is cleared. Andy visits Jacob, who is in a coma, and Laurie, who is badly injured and appears to have no memory of the day of the accident. Andy then returns home alone, where he sits in Jacob's room and reflects.

== Production ==
=== Development ===
On September 20, 2018, it was announced that Apple had given a straight-to-series order consisting of eight episodes to a television miniseries adaptation of William Landay's 2012 novel Defending Jacob. The series was created by Mark Bomback who also wrote the series and executive produced alongside Chris Evans, Morten Tyldum, Rosalie Swedlin, and Adam Shulman. Tyldum also directed the series as well. Production companies involved with the series consist of Paramount Television and Anonymous Content.

=== Casting ===
Alongside the series order announcement, it was confirmed that Chris Evans had been cast in the series' lead role. In March 2019, Michelle Dockery and Jaeden Martell joined the cast of the series. In April 2019, Cherry Jones, Pablo Schreiber, Betty Gabriel and Sakina Jaffrey joined the cast of the series. J. K. Simmons was revealed as part of the cast in a March 2020 trailer.

=== Filming ===
Filming was confirmed to commence in Newton, Massachusetts––the city in which the novel takes place––in April 2019. Three locations were confirmed for filming: Cold Spring Park, the village of Newton Highlands, and the UMass Amherst Mount Ida Campus. Additional filming began in Belmont, Massachusetts. Filming also began in Salem, Massachusetts, on June 15, 2019, as well as at MCI Cedar Junction in Walpole, Massachusetts, on June 17, 2019, and in Lowell, Massachusetts, by the UMass Lowell Tsongas Arena on June 19, 2019. Filming took place at River's Edge in Medford, Massachusetts, on June 21, 2019. Filming also commenced on June 28, 2019, in Worcester, Massachusetts, and on July 8, 2019, in Watertown, Massachusetts, where the facade of the old Watertown Police Station appears as the Newton Police Station in the series. Filming took place on July 9, 2019, at the Town Diner in Watertown. On July 18, 2019, they filmed at C&M Pizza in Leominster, Massachusetts. Neighborhood scenes were filmed in Needham, Massachusetts. The scenes in Mexico were filmed on September 25, 2019, at the Grand Velas hotel in Nuevo Vallarta, in the state of Nayarit. Scenes were filmed also in Waltham on the property of Northgate Gardens Condominium.

== Reception ==
=== Critical response ===
On Rotten Tomatoes, the series' approval rating is 72% based on reviews from 61 critics, with an average rating of 6.68/10. The website's critical consensus is, "Despite outstanding work from Michelle Dockery and Chris Evans, Defending Jacob stretches its source material too thin, undermining its own rich tension with too much melodramatic padding." On Metacritic, the series has a weighted average score of 61 out of 100 based on reviews from 23 critics, indicating "generally favorable reviews". The series has reportedly become the second most popular Apple TV+ show.

=== Accolades ===
| Year | Award | Category | Recipient(s) | Result | Ref. |
|---|---|---|---|---|---|
| 2020 | C21's International Drama Awards | Best Mini Series | Defending Jacob | Nominated | |
| 2020 | Hollywood Critics Association | Best New Streaming Series (Drama) | Defending Jacob | Nominated | |
| 2020 | Primetime Emmy Awards | Outstanding Cinematography for a Limited Series or Movie | Jonathan Freeman (for "After") | Nominated | |
| 2020 | Primetime Emmy Awards | Outstanding Original Main Title Theme Music | Ólafur Arnalds | Nominated | |
