= Krys Marshall =

American actress (born 1988 or 1989)

- Born: 1988/1989 (age 37–38); Atlanta, Georgia, U.S.
- Education: University of North Carolina School of the Arts (BFA)
- Occupation: Actress
- Years active: 2007–present
- Spouse: Ted Dolan (m. 2017)
- Children: 1

Krys Marshall (born 1988/1989) is an American actress. She may be best known for her role as astronaut Danielle Poole on the Apple TV+ series For All Mankind.

== Early life and education ==
Marshall, who is of African American heritage, grew up in Atlanta, Georgia. She attended the magnet program in performing arts at Pebblebrook High School.

Marshall graduated from the University of North Carolina School of the Arts with a B.F.A. in Drama.

== Career ==
Marshall's first television role was a small part in an episode of Criminal Minds. Her other acting credits include parts on the television series NCIS, Supergirl, and This Is Us.

Marshall was asked to read for a role on For All Mankind unexpectedly, while auditioning for a different show. She landed the part of Danielle Poole, NASA's first Black astronaut, that same day. Marshall also hosts the companion podcast for the show, the first such audio series to be produced by Apple TV+.

In 2025, she began starring as Agent Nicole Robinson in the Hulu series Paradise.

== Personal life ==
Marshall identifies as pansexual. In 2017, she married real estate developer Ted Dolan in a ceremony on Mykonos. The couple announced in March 2023 that they are expecting their first child; their child was born in June 2023.

== Filmography ==
=== Film ===
Year	Title	Role	Notes
2011	Lesbian Cops	Officer Rashida Thompson	Short film
2012	Raincheck Romance	Jenny	Short film
2014	Doubles	Radio / TV Personalities	Short film
2018	Soliloquy	Hamlet	Short film
2022	Alone in the Dark	Cheyenne	
2023	It Is What It Is (or the Standards of Outrage)	Presenter 2	Short film
2026	Toy Story 5	Mrs. Manoukian	Voice role

=== Television ===
Year	Title	Role	Notes
2007	Sportlets	Amy / Athletica	2 episodes
2009	Criminal Minds	Vicki	Episode: "To Hell..."
2009	How I Met Your Mother	Bridesmaid	Episode: "Slapsgiving 2: Revenge of the Slap"
2010–2011	Super Sportlets	Amy / Athletica	Main cast
2011	All My Children	Mother	Episode: "1.10594"
2011	The Drama Department	Diana	TV movie
2013	Touch	Claire	Episode: "Ghosts"
2014	Dads	Patron #1	Episode: "Eli Nightingale"
2015	NCIS	Suzy	Episode: "Incognito"
2015	Gone: A Wayward Pines Story	Elena	Webseries; main cast
2017	One Day at a Time	Kristen	Episode: "A Snowman's Tale"
2017	This Is Us	Stacy	Episode: "Jack Pearson's Son"
2018	Supergirl	Julia Freeman / Purity	Recurring role (season 3)
2018	Adam Ruins Everything	Cori	Episode: "Adam Ruins Tech"
2019	Bull	Sadie Williams	Episode: "Her Own Two Feet"
2019–2026	For All Mankind	Danielle Poole	Recurring role (season 1), main cast (seasons 2–4), guest role (season 5)
2020	Shameless	Mora	Episode: "Now Leaving Illinois"
2024	Bad Monkey	Tanny	3 episodes
2025–present	Paradise	Nicole Robinson	Recurring role (season 1), main cast (season 2)

=== Video games ===
Year	Title	Role	Notes
2020	Marvel's Avengers	Additional voices	
