= Defending Jacob =

2012 novel by William Landay

- Author: William Landay
- Published: 2012
- Publisher: Random House
- Pages: 421
- ISBN: 978-0-385-34422-7

Defending Jacob is an American crime drama novel written by novelist William Landay. The book was published in January 2012 by Random House. It tells the story of a father dealing with the accusation that his 14-year-old son is a murderer.

== Plot ==
Andy Barber is an assistant district attorney in Newton, Massachusetts. He is investigating the murder of a 14-year-old boy, Ben Rifkin, who was a classmate of his son Jacob and was found stabbed to death in a park near their school. Andy initially suspects Leonard Patz, a known local pedophile, but soon, he discovers that Ben's friend hints at the animosity between Ben and Jacob. Andy searches Jacob's room and discovers a knife that fits the description of the murder weapon. Unsettled by finding a knife in his son's room, Andy disposes of the knife on the notion of this being what "any parent would do." The next day, he is suddenly pulled off the case when a fingerprint is found inside Ben's sweatshirt that matches Jacob's.

The finding shocks Andy and his wife, Laurie, but does not shake their belief in his innocence. Jacob claims that he found Ben dead in the park and tried to revive him. While Jacob spends the night in jail, Andy reveals to Laurie that his father, Billy Barber, is a convicted murderer and rapist who is serving his life sentence at a Connecticut state prison. At the request of Jacob's lawyer, Andy reluctantly meets with Billy. He seems to be indifferent to Jacob's situation.

At the trial, incriminating evidence comes out, including a story Jacob posted online that reads like a narrative of Ben's murder. Just when things look bad for Jacob, Leonard Patz is found hanging in his house. He leaves behind a suicide note, taking responsibility for Ben's murder, and Jacob is cleared of all charges.

The Barber family is relieved, but Andy feels suspicious about Patz's death. He revisits his father and learns that he had hired a hitman to kill Patz and leave behind the note. Billy expresses regret over his life in prison and realizes he did not want the same for Jacob. This angers Andy since he believes Jacob is innocent and would have been cleared anyway.

Wanting to put the whole ordeal behind them, the Barber family decides to go on a vacation to Jamaica. There, Jacob meets a girl named Hope Connors, and the two become close. One day, while Jacob is relaxing at the resort, his parents notice a red stain on his bathing suit. The next day, Hope is reported missing. Her body is found several weeks later, washed up ashore with evidence pointing to her windpipe being crushed.

Laurie becomes convinced of Jacob's guilt and, in turn, feels guilty herself. On their drive to an interview at a private school, Laurie crashes the car she is driving with Jacob in it, resulting in Jacob's death, while sustaining critical injuries herself. Andy is questioned in connection with Jacob's death but refuses to cooperate or incriminate Laurie in any way. Afterwards, Andy tries to imagine the final moments of Jacob's life and what he would have become if he had lived.

== Writing ==
Landay viewed Defending Jacob as a deviation from his usual style of writing, explaining: "My first two books were easy to categorize as 'crime novels.' I have no problem with that label, but the fact is a lot of mainstream readers simply won't even consider them. You could call Defending Jacob a crime novel, too, but you could just as easily call it a family drama". In an interview with The Huffington Post, Landay said that while he tried to avoid using real-life cases for his books, "there were many cases that inspired various aspects of [Defending Jacob], most of them of only local interest in the Boston area, where I live". In a separate interview, he revealed that "the first manuscript of Defending Jacob that I submitted actually had a different ending. What followed was a very long discussion about how the story could end in a way that was both big enough to be dramatically satisfying yet small enough to be credible for the ordinary people who populate the book".

The opening page of the novel contains an epigraph, attributed to Reynard Thompson, on the human propensity for violence. Landay tweeted in 2020 that Thompson does not exist and that the book from which the quote was allegedly obtained, named A General Theory of Human Violence, is fictional.

== Reception ==
Defending Jacob received generally positive reviews from critics, who praised the book's subject matter and handling of court scenes. Patrick Andersen of The Washington Post called it an "exceptionally serious, suspenseful, engrossing story", with an ending that was "all too real, all too painful, all too haunting". Hallie Ephron of The Boston Globe also positively reviewed the book's "riveting courtroom procedure" and its parallel narratives that "interlock like the teeth of a zipper, building to a tough and unflinching finale". Entertainment Weekly's Thom Geier gave it a B+, stating: "[Landay's] prose can be workmanlike and his dialogue pedestrian (Jacob and his peers sound like no teens you've ever met). But with a grabby premise and careful plotting, he keeps you turning the pages through the shocking gut-punch of an ending".

Writing for the Chicago Tribune, Julia Keller gave the book a mixed review, panning the "inexplicable bursts of clunky, cliche-ridden prose and huge dumps of exposition" and opined that the ending was "signaled so flamboyantly and built up to at such tedious length that that readers will be well within their rights to skim". In his piece for Kirkus Reviews, J. Kingston Pierce disagreed, writing: "Many readers, preferring neatly tied-up plots, will be frustrated by the way Landay drops red herrings and possibly significant clues, but then leaves a surfeit of questions outstanding at the end of the book. However, the raggedness of this story's final section, especially, is one of its signal strengths".

== Television adaptation ==
The novel has been developed into an eight-episode web television miniseries, produced by Apple TV+, starring Chris Evans, Michelle Dockery and Jaeden Martell as the title character. The series premiered on April 24, 2020, and concluded on May 29, 2020.
