= Cynthy Wu =

American actress

- Born: 1997/1998 (age 27–28)
- Occupation: Actress

Cynthy Wu (born 1997/1998) is an American actress. She is known for playing the role of scientist and astronaut Kelly Baldwin on the Apple TV+ series For All Mankind.

Wu is an American of Vietnamese and Chinese descent. She has been acting professionally since 2012.

In 2021, Wu began playing the part of Kelly Baldwin, the daughter adopted from Vietnam by Ed and Karen Baldwin, in season two of For All Mankind. With the help of makeup, her character ages from a teenager in season two to a woman in her 40s by season four, which aired two years later.

In addition to For All Mankind, Wu's television appearances include Twisted (2013) and season two of American Vandal (2018). Her film appearances include Before I Fall (2017), The Happytime Murders (2018), and Holidate (2020).

In 2023, Wu successfully ran for Convention Delegate for the Los Angeles chapter of SAG-AFTRA.

== Filmography ==
=== Film ===
Year	Title	Role	Notes
2015	Road Hard	Tina Madsen	
2016	Wiener Dog Internationals	Etsuko	
2017	Kong: Skull Island	Thug's Girlfriend	
2017	Before I Fall	Ally Harris	
2018	The Long Dumb Road	Whitney	
2018	The Happytime Murders	Brittenie Marlowe	
2020	Holidate	Liz	
2021	The Starling	Receptionist Jill	

=== Television ===
Year	Title	Role	Notes
2012–2013	See Dad Run	Annabelle	2 episodes
2013	Welcome to the Family	Tina	Episode: "Pilot"
2014	Twisted	Andie Dang	Recurring role; 5 episodes
2014	Growing Up Fisher	Nicole	2 episodes
2015	Girl Meets World	Charlotte	Episode: "Girl Meets the Tell-Tale-Tot"
2016	Survivor's Remorse	Kristine Lang	2 episodes
2016	Prototype	Jennifer	Television film
2017	The Catch	Yumi	2 episodes
2017	Just Doug	Carol	
2018	American Vandal	Mia Abend	Recurring role (season 2); 5 episodes
2018	Now We're Talking	Jasmine	8 episodes
2019	Weird City	Steffi / Schmeidre	4 episodes
2019	Sneaky Pete	Jeannine	Episode: "The Huckleberry Jones"
2018–2019	This Close	Sara	3 episodes
2021	Calls	Denise (voice)	Episode: "Is There a Scientist on the Plane?"
2021–2026	For All Mankind	Kelly Baldwin	Main role (seasons 2–5); 38 episodes
2022	Station 19	Anna	2 episodes
2023	Beef	Young Hanh Trinh Lau	Episode: "The Drama of Original Choice"
