= Wes Lieberher =

American chef

- Born: Wesley Lieberher; April 1, 1979 (age 47); Philadelphia, Pennsylvania
- Occupations: Executive chef Vocalist
- Years active: 1999–present
- Spouse: Bree Lieberher
- Children: 4, including Jaeden Martell

Wesley Lieberher (born April 1, 1979) is an American executive chef, known for his work with Beer Belly and Whiz in Los Angeles. Lieberher is also frontman of national music act Kill Verona. He has appeared on Travel Channel's Food Paradise, Food Network's Diners, Drive-Ins, and Dives, Esquire Network's Knife Fight, ABC's The Taste, and Food Network's Super Chef Grudge Match in 2023. In 2024, he won the AHF National Culinary Championship in San Antonio, TX. He is the father of American actor Jaeden Martell.
