= Road Hard =

- Theatrical release poster
- Directed by: Adam Carolla
- Written by: Adam Carolla; Kevin Hench
- Produced by: Adam Carolla; Nate Adams; Kelly Carter
- Starring: Adam Carolla; Jay Mohr; Howie Mandel; David Koechner; David Alan Grier; Philip Rosenthal; Larry Miller; Illeana Douglas; Diane Farr; Dana Gould; Cynthy Wu
- Cinematography: Mårten Tedin
- Edited by: Ryan Brown
- Music by: Andrew Johnson
- Production company: Sontalia
- Distributed by: FilmBuff
- Release date: March 6, 2015 (United States)
- Running time: 98 minutes
- Country: United States
- Language: English
- Box office: $113,169

Road Hard is a 2015 comedy film directed by Adam Carolla and written by Carolla and Kevin Hench. The film stars Carolla, Diane Farr, Larry Miller, David Alan Grier, and David Koechner. The film was released in selected theaters and on video on demand on March 6, 2015. This was Windell Middlebrooks' last film, as he died three days after the premiere.

== Plot ==
Years after his movie and sitcom career has run dry, Bruce Madsen is reduced to headlining one dingy comedy club after another, spending his nights in budget hotel rooms, and flying coach while his former fans sit in first class. He has only one question: What the hell happened? Amidst trying to revitalize his career, rekindle his love life, and put his daughter through college, Bruce knows one thing for sure - he must get off the road - hard. Road Hard is the story of that journey.

== Cast ==
- Adam Carolla as Bruce Madsen
- David Koechner as Chad
- Diane Farr as Sarah
- Larry Miller as "Babydoll"
- Jay Mohr as Jack Taylor
- David Alan Grier as Michael
- Windell Middlebrooks as Reggie
- Howie Mandel as himself
- Dana Gould as himself
- Philip Rosenthal as Phil
- Cynthy Wu as Tina Madsen
- Alison Rosen as Jessica, a flight attendant
- Illeana Douglas
- Steve Hofstetter
- Jenna Mourey as Jenna Marbles

== Production ==
The film was crowdfunded using FundAnything.com. Filming began on April 14, 2014, and ended on May 10, 2014.

== Release ==
The film was released in selected theaters and on Video-on-Demand on March 6, 2015.

== Reception ==
Road Hard received mixed reviews from critics. The review aggregator website Rotten Tomatoes reported a 48% approval rating, with a rating average of 5.6/10, based on 21 reviews. On Metacritic, which assigns a normalized rating out of 100 based on reviews from critics, the film has a score of 50 based on 12 reviews, indicating "mixed or average reviews".
