= Calls (TV series) =

French-American mystery thriller television miniseries

- Promotional poster
- Genre: Mystery thriller
- Created by: Fede Álvarez
- Based on: Calls by Timothée Hochet
- Directed by: Fede Álvarez
- Starring: Nick Jonas; Pedro Pascal; Rosario Dawson; Lily Collins; Aaron Taylor-Johnson; Aubrey Plaza
- Composer: The Haxan Cloak
- Countries of origin: United States; France
- Original language: English
- No. of episodes: 9

Production
- Executive producers: Fede Álvarez; Anna Marsh; Françoise Guyonnet; Shana Eddy-Grouf; Raphaël Benoliel; Timothée Hochet; Alexei Tylevich
- Producer: Aaron Greenberg
- Running time: 13–21 minutes
- Production companies: StudioCanal; Bad Hombre; Logan

Original release
- Network: Canal+ (France); Apple TV+ (United States)
- Release: March 19, 2021

Calls is a mystery thriller analog animated miniseries created by Fede Álvarez. The show is based on a French television series of the same name created by Timothée Hochet. The series is a co-production between Apple TV+ and French network Canal+, the latter being the production company behind the original French version. It premiered on Apple TV+ on March 19, 2021. It received acclaim from critics and audiences. The series won a Primetime Emmy Award for Outstanding Motion Design.

== Premise ==
Told through a series of interconnected phone conversations, these conversations chronicle the mysterious story of a group of strangers whose lives are thrown into disarray in the lead-up to an apocalyptic event.

Calls allows "audiences to experience short stories through real-life audio sources and minimal visuals."

== Cast ==
- Aaron Taylor-Johnson as Mark
- Aubrey Plaza as Dr. Rachel Wheating
- Ben Schwartz as Andy
- Clancy Brown as General Wilson
- Danny Huston as Frank
- Danny Pudi as Dr. Burman
- Edi Patterson as Darlene
- Gilbert Owuor as Craig
- Jaeden Martell as Justin
- Jenica Bergere as Mom
- Jennifer Tilly as Mother
- Joey King as Skylar
- Johnny Sneed as Perry
- Judy Greer as Alexis
- Karen Gillan as Sara
- Laura Harrier as Layla
- Lily Collins as Camila
- Mark Duplass as Patrick
- Nick Jonas as Sam
- Nicholas Braun as Tim
- Paola Nuñez as Ana
- Paul Walter Hauser as Floyd
- Pedro Pascal as Pedro
- Riley Keough as Rose
- Rosario Dawson as Katherine
- Stephen Lang as Dr. Wheating

== Production ==
On June 21, 2018, it was reported that Apple had given the production a series order for a first season consisting of ten episodes. The series, an English-language adaptation of original French series Calls, was created by original series creator Timothée Hochet. The show is a co-production between Apple TV+ and French network Canal+. Alongside Apple's series order announcement, it was confirmed that Apple had acquired the rights to the existing season of the original French series.

== Episodes ==
No.	Title	Directed by	Written by	Original release date
1	"The End"	Fede Álvarez	Teleplay by : Fede Álvarez; Based on a story by : Timothée Hochet	March 19, 2021
The calls take place on December 30th in New York City and Los Angeles. A couple, Sara in New York and Tim in Los Angeles, are on a phone call. Their long-distance relationship is not working, and Tim is trying to break up with Sara because he has met someone else in LA. Tim's new lover, Camila, calls him to check if he has already broken up with Sara. Camila is taking care of her sister's baby, and during the call, the baby suddenly goes missing, causing Camila to drop the call. Sara calls Tim back, terrified because someone is trying to break into her house. A horrified Sara then calls 911 as the intruder does not look human; it is huge and has incredibly long arms. Moments later, Sara is found mutilated by a deputy. He abandons her because the world is ending, leaving only Sara and Tim to say their final words to each other. Earthquakes strike, people disappear, and everyone starts floating. Tim confesses that he cheated on Sara, and they say that they love each other as the sky opens up. Cast: Nicholas Braun, Lily Collins, Karen Gillan, Nika Futterman
2	"The Beginning"	Fede Álvarez	Fede Álvarez	March 19, 2021
The calls take place on Feb 9th in Phoenix. Mark has just found out his wife, Rose, is pregnant. Stressed, as they always agreed on not having children, he punches the garage door, leaves his house, and begins to drive. Rose calls him to come back and discuss it further, but Mark refuses and says he's going to his friend's house to cool down. He then immediately calls his friend Andy, who answers, very worried about him, asking Mark where he has been and telling him he has been gone for days. The call breaks up and Rose calls him back, now telling him he's been gone for 6 months. Not believing what is happening, Mark calls his mom, where he finds out that he's been gone for 12 years, and his mom is now very sick. The call breaks up and Andy answers the phone. It is now his son's 12th birthday, and Andy and Rose are married now. Finally, Mark receives a call from a 20-year-old, his son, who cries and tells him that he wants to meet for a beer. Mark now looks at his injured hand from punching the garage door and realizes that it's only the calls that are strange, as in his point of view, his reality is still normal, and then goes back home to Rose and their unborn son. Cast: Aaron Taylor-Johnson, Riley Keough, Ben Schwartz, Jennifer Tilly, Kyle McCarley
3	"Pedro Across the Street"	Fede Álvarez	Nick Cuse	March 19, 2021
Patrick is at home writing his novel when he gets a call from his Chilean neighbor Pedro. Pedro says that he is currently in an airport and forgot to lock his door. He then asks Patrick to make sure a mysterious heavy bag in the unlocked house is "safe." Patrick calls his wife Alexis, where she gets mad at him for bringing the mysterious bag home. Both of them find out that the bag came from Alexis' bank workplace, and discover that it is full of hundreds of thousands of stolen dollars. Police then raid Pedro's home and Pedro then explains that he got this money from cheating with Alexis, and he found out he was going to jail because he received a call from a different version of himself, who is currently in prison. Patrick then realizes that Alexis has been very rude and manipulative of their relationship and chastises her for that. Patrick abandons the both of them and runs away with the money to get a luxury life. (The phone calls take place on March 2nd in Pasadena.) Cast: Mark Duplass, Judy Greer, Pedro Pascal
4	"It's All In Your Head"	Fede Álvarez	Aidan Fitzgerald & Noah Gardner	March 19, 2021
A divorcing couple, and the wife's sister, call back and forth. Each sister demands the attention of someone else, until ultimately painful truths are revealed. (The calls take place on March 29th, San Francisco.) Cast: Rosario Dawson, Laura Harrier, Gilbert Owuor
5	"Me, Myself & Darlene"	Fede Álvarez	Rodo Sayagues & Fede Álvarez	March 19, 2021
A man named Floyd calls up 911 confessing to an accidental murder. He believes that he has killed his girlfriend Darlene, but gets confused when he gets a call from her while he is next to her dead body. At first he thinks that he accidentally killed her sister, but the 911 operator reveals that he might be talking to different version of Darlene that is a few minutes in the past - based on other similar recent 911 calls. Floyd apologizes to Darlene and tries to save her from his past self - the other timeline does change, but the present does not! Police officers despatched by the 911 operator in the present arrest Floyd. (The calls take place on June 5th in Huntsville, Alabama.) Cast: Paul Walter Hauser, Edi Patterson, Paola Nuñez
6	"The Universe Did It"	Fede Álvarez	Aidan Fitzgerald, Noah Gardner & Fede Álvarez	March 19, 2021
A strange phone call alters a young girl's destiny, but not as much as she thinks. (The calls begin on September 14th, Indian Wells, California.) Cast: Nick Jonas, Danny Huston, Shane Paul McGhie, Tessa De Nicola, Tiana Camacho
7	"Mom"	Fede Álvarez	Aidan Fitzgerald, Noah Gardner & Fede Álvarez	March 19, 2021
Two grieving siblings have heard about mysterious phone calls that can cross time, and want to try and reach their mother in the past. But they didn't pay attention to how those Internet stories warned about the dangers of changing the past. (The calls take place on November 9th, between San Diego and Ribbonwood, California.) Cast: Joey King, Jaeden Martell, Jenica Bergere
8	"Is There a Scientist on the Plane?"	Fede Álvarez	Aidan Fitzgerald, Noah Gardner & Fede Álvarez	March 19, 2021
The passengers on Flight 908 are horrified by a news report that their plane was struck by lightning and crashed near Phoenix. (The calls take place on December 30th over US Airspace.) Cast: Johnny Sneed, Aubrey Plaza, Clancy Brown, Cynthy Wu, Quinn Minichino, Mitch Eakins
9	"Leap Year Girl"	Fede Álvarez	Fede Álvarez	March 19, 2021
After the fate of Flight 908, a pair of physicists are trying desperately to figure out how and why phone calls are crossing the dimensional barrier. And it may involve an abandoned project from 1978. (The calls take place on December 30th, in Azusa, California and Ithaca, New York.) Cast: Aubrey Plaza, Stephen Lang, Danny Pudi, Clancy Brown, Keri Tombazian, Jocelyn Ayanna, Brandon Papo

== Reception ==
The review aggregation website Rotten Tomatoes reports that 95% of 20 reviews are positive for the series, with an average rating of 8.4/10. The critics consensus states, "Recalling the immersive serials of radio's heyday, Calls weaves a spooky mystery with terrific vocal performances and unsettling ambience — letting the visual storytelling play out in viewers' horrified imaginations."
