= For All Mankind (TV series) =

2019 American science fiction drama

- Genre: Alternate history; Drama; Science fiction
- Created by: Ronald D. Moore; Matt Wolpert; Ben Nedivi
- Starring: Joel Kinnaman; Michael Dorman; Sarah Jones; Shantel VanSanten; Jodi Balfour; Wrenn Schmidt; Sonya Walger; Krys Marshall; Cynthy Wu; Casey W. Johnson; Coral Peña; Edi Gathegi; Toby Kebbell; Tyner Rushing; Svetlana Efremova; Daniel Stern; Mireille Enos; Costa Ronin; Sean Kaufman; Ruby Cruz; Ines Asserson
- Music by: Jeff Russo; Paul Doucette
- Country of origin: United States
- Original language: English
- No. of seasons: 5
- No. of episodes: 50

Production
- Executive producers: Ronald D. Moore; Matt Wolpert; Ben Nedivi; Maril Davis; Seth Gordon; Naren Shankar
- Producer: Dia Dufault
- Production location: Los Angeles, California
- Camera setup: Single-camera
- Running time: 43–83 minutes
- Production companies: Tall Ship Productions; Delicatessen Media; Sony Pictures Television (Note: Credited as Sony Pictures Television Studios for seasons 2–4)

Original release
- Network: Apple TV+
- Release: November 1, 2019 – January 12, 2024
- Network: Apple TV
- Release: March 27, 2026 – present

Related
- Star City

For All Mankind is an American science fiction drama television series created by Ronald D. Moore, Matt Wolpert, and Ben Nedivi and produced for the Apple TV streaming service. The series dramatizes an alternate history depicting "what would have happened if the global space race had never ended" after the Soviet Union succeeds in the first crewed Moon landing ahead of the United States. The title is inspired by the lunar plaque left on the Moon by the crew of Apollo 11, which reads, in part, "We Came in Peace for All Mankind".

The series stars an ensemble cast including Joel Kinnaman, Michael Dorman, Sarah Jones, Shantel VanSanten, Jodi Balfour, Wrenn Schmidt, Sonya Walger, and Krys Marshall. Cynthy Wu, Casey W. Johnson, and Coral Peña joined the main cast for the second season. Edi Gathegi joined in the third. Toby Kebbell, Tyner Rushing, Svetlana Efremova, and Daniel Stern joined in the fourth. Mireille Enos, Costa Ronin, Sean Kaufman, Ruby Cruz, and Ines Asserson joined in the fifth. The series features historical figures, played by actors or appearing through archival footage, including astronauts and NASA officials as well as American presidents and other politicians.

For All Mankind premiered on November 1, 2019. The show's second season was critically acclaimed and was nominated for the TCA Award for Outstanding Achievement in Drama. In 2023, the writers said that, from the beginning, they had discussed that their goal was that there would be "about seven seasons" and that the story will span "at least 70 years". In April 2024, the series was renewed for a fifth season, and it was announced that Star City, a spinoff series focusing on the Soviet space program, was in development, which premiered on May 29, 2026. The fifth season premiered on March 27, 2026. Prior to the fifth-season premiere, the series was renewed for a sixth and final season, set to premiere in 2027.

== Premise ==
In an alternate timeline in 1969, Soviet cosmonaut Alexei Leonov becomes the first human to land on the Moon. This outcome devastates morale at NASA but also catalyzes a U.S. effort to catch up. With the Soviet Union emphasizing equality by including a woman in subsequent landings, the United States is forced to match pace, equally training women and ethnic minorities (who were largely excluded from the initial decades of U.S. space exploration).

Pushed by higher competition, the Soviet and other blocs favor more competent leaders, modernizing earlier and on more rational ground. With sustained investments in technology, a broad, sustained, and global technological race takes place, with a wide range of dramatic civilian effects, such as early civil rights, electric vehicles, civilian fusion power, controlled CO_{2} production, and no climate crisis. Each subsequent season takes place about a decade later, with season two taking place in the 1980s, season three taking place in the 1990s, season four taking place in the 2000s, and season five taking place in the 2010s.

Ronald D. Moore explained how historical reality had been different from the series: "Sergei Korolev was the father of the Soviet space program; in our reality, he died during an operation in Moscow (in 1966) ... And after that point, their Moon program really never pulled together.... Our point of divergence was that Korolev lives, ... and he made their Moon landing happen."

== Cast and characters ==
- Joel Kinnaman as Edward "Ed" Baldwin (seasons 1–5), one of NASA's top astronauts, initially based on Apollo 10 commander Thomas P. Stafford
- Michael Dorman as Gordon "Gordo" Stevens (seasons 1–2; guest season 5), an astronaut and Ed's best friend, based on Apollo 10's Lunar Module pilot Gene Cernan
- Sarah Jones as Tracy Stevens (seasons 1–2), Gordo's wife who later also becomes an astronaut as one of "Nixon's Women"
- Shantel VanSanten as Karen Baldwin (seasons 1–3; guest seasons 4–5), (Note: Uncredited in season four) Ed's wife who later owns the Outpost Tavern and then becomes head of Helios Aerospace
- Jodi Balfour as Ellen Wilson (née Waverly) (seasons 1–3; guest season 4), an astronaut and member of "Nixon's Women" who later becomes Administrator of NASA, a United States senator and President of the United States following the 1992 presidential election
- Wrenn Schmidt as Margo Madison (seasons 1–5), (Note: In season five, Wrenn Schmidt is only credited with the main cast in the first three episodes and then as a guest in the tenth episode.) a NASA engineer who was mentored by Wernher von Braun, inspired by Margaret Hamilton
- Sonya Walger as Molly Cobb (seasons 2–3; recurring season 1), (Note: In season three, Sonya Walger is only credited with the main cast in the first two episodes and then as a guest star in the tenth episode.) an astronaut and member of "Nixon's Women", based on Jerrie Cobb
- Krys Marshall as Danielle Poole (seasons 2–4; recurring season 1; guest season 5), an astronaut and member of "Nixon's Women"
- Cynthy Wu as Kelly Baldwin (née Hanh Nguyen, before adoption) (seasons 2–5), a scientist and Ed and Karen's adopted daughter
- Casey W. Johnson as Danny Stevens (seasons 2–3; guest season 4), an astronaut and Gordo and Tracy's son
  - Jason David and Mason Thames as young Danny Stevens (recurring season 1)
- Coral Peña as Aleida Rosales (season 2–present), an undocumented immigrant who is fascinated by space and later gets mentored by Margo before becoming a NASA engineer herself
  - Olivia Trujillo as young Aleida Rosales (recurring season 1)
- Edi Gathegi as Dev Ayesa (season 3–present), the founder of Helios Aerospace, a private space company with the goal to reach Mars before NASA and the Soviet Union
- Toby Kebbell as Miles Dale (season 4–present), a former offshore oil platform worker who pursues a new job opportunity on Mars
- Tyner Rushing as Samantha Massey (season 4), a space worker on the Mars colony
- Svetlana Efremova as Irina Morozova (season 4; recurring season 5), a high-ranking Soviet official
- Daniel Stern as Eli Hobson (season 4), the NASA administrator
- Mireille Enos as Celia Boyd (season 5), a member of the Peacekeeper Security Force on Mars
- Costa Ronin as Leonid "Lenya" Polivanov (season 5), a Soviet politician and former cosmonaut, and governor of Mars
- Sean Kaufman as Alex Poletov Baldwin (season 5), son of Kelly Baldwin and Ed's grandson
  - Ezrah Lin as young Alex Poletov (recurring season 4)
- Ruby Cruz as Lily Dale (season 5), the youngest daughter of Miles and Amanda Dale
  - Piper Rubio as young Lily Dale (recurring season 4)
- Ines Asserson as Avery "A.J." Jarrett (née Stevens) (season 5), a U.S. Marine training for a space mission and the daughter of Danny and Amber Stevens
  - Delaney Claire Evans (guest season 3), Parker Reese Evans (guest season 3) and Ellie Grace Pomeroy (guest season 4) as young Avery Stevens

== Episodes ==
Season	Episodes	Originally released		
Season	Episodes	First released	Last released	Network
1	10	November 1, 2019	December 20, 2019	Apple TV+
2	10	February 19, 2021	April 23, 2021	Apple TV+
3	10	June 10, 2022	August 12, 2022	Apple TV+
4	10	November 10, 2023	January 12, 2024	Apple TV+
5	10	March 27, 2026	May 29, 2026	Apple TV

=== Season 1 (2019) ===
No. overall	No. in season	Title	Directed by	Written by	Original release date
1	1	"Red Moon"	Seth Gordon	Story by : Ronald D. Moore & Matt Wolpert & Ben Nedivi; Teleplay by : Ronald D. Moore	November 1, 2019
Soviet cosmonaut Alexei Leonov becomes the first man on the Moon in June 1969, causing a rush at NASA for an American Moon landing. While blowing off steam at a bar with friends after the landing, Apollo 10 astronaut Edward Baldwin admits to a reporter, while drunk, that he thinks NASA could have done more to put an American on the Moon first. Baldwin is reassigned by NASA director Wernher von Braun from flight duty after his comments become public. A month later, after tensions have risen, Apollo 11 crash-lands on the Moon and loses contact with NASA, but after more than four hours, Armstrong and Aldrin reestablish contact and announce that they have survived the crash, although their lunar module is tilted in a precarious attitude. After the successful landing, Baldwin hopes to be reestablished as an astronaut on Apollo 15, and Gordo's family also watches the launch at a party. Meanwhile, a Mexican family listening to the launch over a radio illegally crosses the border into the United States.
2	2	"He Built the Saturn V"	Seth Gordon	Matt Wolpert & Ben Nedivi	November 1, 2019
After a harrowing liftoff made necessary by their near-crash landing, the crew of Apollo 11 successfully returns from the Moon. Director Wernher von Braun opposes President Nixon's directive to build a military Moon base. Representative Sandman tells Baldwin that if he publicly criticizes von Braun about the aborted Apollo 10 landing, Nixon will reinstate him as an active astronaut on Apollo 15. Instead, confusing and angering Sandman, Baldwin defends von Braun, but Nixon's men use his past involvement with the Nazi regime to remove him as Deputy Associate Administrator for Planning. Margo confronts von Braun about his past, and he defends his choices, much to her disappointment. Deke Slayton reinstates Baldwin as commander of Apollo 15 even though he did not do what Sandman wanted. As the Apollo 12 mission launches, the Soviet Union lands the first woman on the Moon, shocking everyone in flight control.
3	3	"Nixon's Women"	Allen Coulter	Nichole Beattie	November 1, 2019
Deke Slayton must recruit female astronauts after the Soviet landing prompts intense public pressure. An elimination process whittles the initial field of 20 "astronaut candidates" (informally "ASCANs") to just five, including Tracy Stevens (wife of Apollo 15's Gordo Stevens), the last two of the Mercury 13 Molly Cobb and Patty Doyle, a black woman named Danielle Poole who works as a NASA computer, and the reserved Ellen Waverly. NASA probes find water on the Moon, highlighting a spot to put the American Moon base. During a training session on a 20-mile hike, Tracy assists an injured Ellen and helps her to the finish line, risking not completing it herself. The candidates then practice piloting a simulated Moon landing with the Lunar Landing Training Vehicle. While driving out of the city, Gordo spots smoke and returns to the NASA base, where Tracy meets him and reveals that Patty Doyle has died in a crash.
4	4	"Prime Crew"	Allen Coulter	Naren Shankar	November 8, 2019
NASA scientists discover that there could be patches of ice on the Moon, which has the potential of being turned into rocket fuel. A Soviet mission goes bad and crashes on the Moon, killing a cosmonaut. The equipment they had appears to have been used to help establish a Moon base near the frozen water source. This pushes NASA to accelerate its own plans. The 1972 presidential election is approaching, with Ted Kennedy as the frontrunner for the Democratic nomination. The Vietnam War ends. Deke Slayton makes a change to the Apollo 15 crew, replacing Gordo Stevens with Molly Cobb. Stevens wonders what he did wrong and confesses to Tracy, but still wants to celebrate her accomplishments. While training for the Apollo 15 launch, Molly is annoyed by Ed and the other crew members' sexism, and Ed is disapproving of Molly's boasting. Despite being doubted, Molly performs smoothly at the launch.
5	5	"Into the Abyss"	Sergio Mimica-Gezzan	David Weddle & Bradley Thompson	November 15, 2019
The crew of Apollo 15 take a significant risk, changing their landing site to be near Shackleton crater, a promising location for finding water that would be essential to any lunar colonization effort. After tense initial interactions, Molly's husband, Wayne, and Karen reveal their fears to each other. Danielle's husband returns from fighting in Vietnam, and they argue with Gordo Stevens, ending with Danielle warning Gordo to stay away. After two days of venturing onto the surface without results, Molly volunteers to rappel into the crater. She finds ice, and they return home triumphant. The episode ends with the Jamestown landing two years later on October 12, 1973, to become NASA's first Moon base.
6	6	"Home Again"	Sergio Mimica-Gezzan	Stephanie Shannon	November 22, 2019
By August 24, 1974, Jamestown Base has three people in it: Edward Baldwin, Gordo Stevens, and Danielle Poole. The Equal Rights Amendment is ratified as an amendment to the Constitution as a result of campaigning by President Ted Kennedy. Apollo 23 explodes on the launchpad, killing 11 members of the ground crew and Gene Kranz, the new Director of Johnson Space Center. Sixty days later, the USSR announces the establishment of a Soviet Moon base named Zvezda, located eight miles (13 km) away from Jamestown Base. Margo notices Aleida working on her math homework. The FBI investigation on Apollo 23 turns its focus to Ellen and Larry's private life. Margo visits von Braun, who tells her that her father worked on the Manhattan Project. He tells her of evidence that political factors indirectly caused the Apollo 23 disaster, which Margo uses to blackmail NASA into making her a flight director. Richard Nixon is pardoned for the Watergate scandal by President Kennedy. Gordo sees some unexplained red flashing lights near Jamestown Base.
7	7	"Hi Bob"	Meera Menon	Ronald D. Moore	November 28, 2019
NASA has replaced the component that caused the Apollo 23 accident, but the Apollo 24 relief mission is continually delayed for different reasons involving the wrongful production and manufacturing of the Saturn V. Gordo begins to develop mental health problems from the prolonged isolation. Ed decides that Gordo should be evacuated back to Earth with Danielle, even though this means Gordo would be prevented from ever flying again. Danielle deliberately breaks her arm, providing an excuse for Gordo to bring her back to Earth without revealing his psychological issues. Danielle's husband is unable to get a job. After harsh interrogations by the FBI, Ellen and Larry choose to marry to avoid a potential homosexuality scandal, though Pam, Ellen's lover, tells her they are over if she accepts the proposal. Ed's son, Shane, starts getting into trouble at school and later steals from a local store. During an argument, Karen slaps him and grounds him as punishment until she returns home. Disillusioned with his troubled family life, Shane sneaks out to participate in a basketball game and is hit by a car offscreen.
8	8	"Rupture"	Meera Menon	Nichole Beattie	December 6, 2019
Back on Earth, Gordo sees a psychiatrist without NASA's knowledge, and Danielle worries that his willingness to reveal that she broke her arm for him publicly will get both of them grounded by officials. Shane's accident leaves him brain dead. Karen frantically holds out hope and decides that Ed should not know about it. Ed is told to spy on the Soviet base, and then discovers a Soviet camera has been recording him working inside the crater. The Soviets send Ed a condolence message, confusing him, and he destroys the Soviet camera. After accepting that Shane is beyond saving, Karen takes him off the respirator and reveals to Ed that Shane has died. Aleida is given a scholarship for a math and physics program, but considers delaying it because she does not want to leave her friends and new boyfriend.
9	9	"Bent Bird"	John Dahl	David Weddle & Bradley Thompson	December 13, 2019
Karen struggles to cope with Shane's death but finds comfort with Wayne. Apollo 24 has a technical failure while in orbit, so they cannot transit to the Moon. Apollo 25 (with Dennis, Tracy, and Molly) quickly launches to fix Apollo 24, but just after the repairs are finished, Apollo 24's engines ignite prematurely, incinerating Harrison Liu while leaving Molly adrift. On Apollo 24, Ellen is knocked out, and Deke's status is unknown as he was tethered outside to the spacecraft. Molly is rescued, but the accident causes a trajectory change that will cause Apollo 24 to miss the Moon and fly into deep space. Tensions escalate between the rival lunar explorers, and the Soviets investigate the U.S. lunar mine. Octavio is uncovered as an illegal immigrant and is apprehended by the authorities. Later, without enough oxygen to return to his base, a cosmonaut asks for help at Jamestown. Ed invites him in, but depressurizes the airlock after the cosmonaut removes his space suit.
10	10	"A City Upon a Hill"	John Dahl	Matt Wolpert & Ben Nedivi	December 20, 2019
Aleida asks to live with Margo, but Margo refuses. Meanwhile, in space, Apollo 24's S-IVB burns to depletion, sending the spacecraft way off course. Ed interrogates the cosmonaut, who is still alive but is now his captive. NASA attempts to regain contact with Apollo 24. Ellen wakes up and tends to Deke, who has suffered a puncture wound. They perform a burn using the service module engine to correct their course, but their fuel supplies are depleted before the course correction is complete. Ed launches the LSAM with help from the cosmonaut to perform a rescue of Apollo 24 and capture the spacecraft into lunar orbit. Unfortunately, the spacecraft is tumbling, making it nearly impossible for Ed to dock. Instead of docking, Ellen suggests that Ed throw the fuel capsule to Apollo 24. The capsule soars too high above the craft, but Ellen lunges toward it, capturing it. Deke dies from his internal injuries as the rescue mission is completed, and is buried on the Moon, with a memorial set in lunar rock. In a post-credits scene in 1983, Ed and Karen discuss live coverage from the South Pacific Ocean showing the launch of a Sea Dragon rocket carrying a plutonium payload for expansion of the Jamestown colony.

=== Season 2 (2021) ===
No. overall	No. in season	Title	Directed by	Written by	Original release date
11	1	"Every Little Thing"	Michael Morris	Ronald D. Moore	February 19, 2021
In 1983, Jamestown has expanded to accommodate more astronauts and equipment. Ronald Reagan is president, having won the 1976 presidential election and been re-elected in 1980. Ed is chief of the Astronaut Office, Karen runs the Outpost and they have adopted a daughter, Kelly, who works with Karen. At Jamestown, Ellen looks forward to handing over the reins and returning home. On the ground, Tracy announces her marriage to financier Sam Cleveland on The Tonight Show, blindsiding her ex-husband Gordo. At NASA, a solar flare and a solar storm cause problems on Earth, on Skylab and at Jamestown. Without the protective shielding of the Earth's magnetic field and Earth's atmosphere, astronauts are forced to shelter and wait it out. While most make it to safety, Molly and colleague Wubbo Ockels are still on the lunar surface. Molly finds shelter in a lava tube but Wubbo crashes his rover nearby. She leaves the safety of the tube to rescue him as the solar storm hits the Moon, leaving her radiation dosimeter behind in the process. She returns to the lava tube with Wubbo who is alive but has sustained a large dose of radiation.
12	2	"The Bleeding Edge"	Michael Morris	Matt Wolpert & Ben Nedivi	February 26, 2021
Molly lies to Ellen about going out to rescue Wubbo, but Ellen cautiously takes them both back to Earth with her. On the ground, a hero's welcome awaits but Molly is affected by her exposure to the harmful radiation. Ellen begins a new post as Deputy NASA Administrator and tries to resist calls to cut funding to the Mars program. Margo plans a joint Apollo-Soyuz mission between the US and Soviet Union which could de-escalate tensions yet possibly compromise classified NASA technology. Meanwhile, Kelly looks at college brochures for Annapolis and quizzes Tracy and Gordo's eldest son Danny, who is on leave from there, for information. Danielle asks to go back to the Moon during a catch-up with fellow Jamestown pioneers Ed and Gordo. After a family reunion, Gordo's excessive drinking forces Karen to call Ed down to the Outpost to intervene. As he walks his friend home, Gordo drunkenly confesses to Ed he feels he left behind a piece of himself on the Moon; he feels lost and an embarrassment to his boys. Ed assigns Danielle and Gordo to the next Moon mission.
13	3	"Rules of Engagement"	Andrew Stanton	Stephanie Shannon	March 5, 2021
The Americans plan to send guns to the Moon to take a mining site back from the Soviets after Ed realizes they bugged the base 10 years ago. Margo attempts to reconcile with Aleida after almost a decade by offering her a Systems Engineer position at NASA after learning from Aleida's boyfriend, Davey, that she will be deported if she cannot hold a job. Aleida refuses to accept, not wanting to be embarrassed as she has been fired from all her past jobs for behavioral issues, though her past bosses have complimented her skills and engineering. Davey convinces her to take the job, but she breaks up with him for going behind her back. Tracy's escapade in the Outpost ends with her calling for Gordo's help, fueling their feud that may further affect their mission assignments. Kelly makes it clear that she wants to attend the Naval Academy in Annapolis. Karen comes to terms with this, but Ed becomes furious, not wanting to lose Kelly like he lost Shane. Crying together, they eventually realize that they need to let Kelly live her own life and allow her to attend the academy.
14	4	"Pathfinder"	Andrew Stanton	David Weddle & Bradley Thompson	March 12, 2021
Ed appoints himself to Mission Commander for the next generation nuclear-powered Space Shuttle Pathfinder, after Karen encourages him to go back to space now that Kelly is going to Annapolis. Ed asks Molly Cobb to assume his position as chief of the Astronaut Office, and she accepts. Danielle Poole visits her sister-in-law after Clayton's suicide. They argue, and Danielle realizes that she is missing out on opportunities as a token hire. She confronts Ed on his last day and demands Mission Commander status. Shortly afterwards, Ed is called into his final meeting, where he announces Danielle will be commanding the Apollo–Soyuz rendezvous mission. Gordo experiences anxiety about his upcoming mission, and has a panic attack when a helmet is sealed on his spacesuit during fitting. Ed reassures him that he is ready for the mission in a terse conversation prior to both astronauts flying to Cape Canaveral. During the flight, Ed challenges Gordo to a dogfight. After risky maneuvers, Ed's aircraft experiences an engine fire, and he ejects into the Gulf of Mexico.
15	5	"The Weight"	Meera Menon	Nichole Beattie & Joe Menosky	March 19, 2021
After Karen's initial distress regarding Ed's accident, she avoids discussion of it once he returns home safely. Ed and Gordo are given a stern warning by Molly despite Margo and NASA Administrator Thomas Paine's plea for a harsher punishment. After an awkward reception at the Jamestown base, Tracy is introduced to the resident illegal distiller of ethanol during a tour. Just one month into her six-month mission, vent noise, cigarette cravings, and the monotony drive Tracy to smoke in the old airlock and take up drinking. The blocked vent causes a base-wide CO_{2} alert. Tracy is almost sent home but is given a second chance on the condition that her special treatment ends and she is given double shifts. Molly starts having trouble with her vision. Aleida is given a condescending welcome to NASA as a rookie engineer on the Apollo–Soyuz project. Ellen visits a poetry reading of Pam's and, despite being surprised by Pam's new girlfriend, agrees to meet for drinks at the Outpost. This leads to them having sex. Gordo battles to overcome his claustrophobia and poor fitness. A mission launches to Jamestown with firearms.
16	6	"Best-Laid Plans"	Meera Menon	Joe Menosky	March 26, 2021
The Soviet crew arrive in the US for the Apollo-Soyuz mission, but objects to every proposal made by NASA including the project name. The new arrivals at Jamestown practice firing their rifles and flying the LSAM. The Baldwins watch the Sea Dragon launch, previously shown at the end of season 1, and reminisce about adopting Kelly. Kelly starts writing about her life for her Annapolis entrance. Danielle and her fellow astronaut takes the two Cosmonauts (Orlov and Alexeev) to the Outpost where they begin to bond. Margo tells Sergei to meet her at the 11:59 club where they hit upon the design of an androgynous docking adapter. Aleida helps to refine the design later. Ellen tells Pam she loves her, and asks Larry for a divorce. Gordo tells Tracy's new husband, Sam, that he intends to win her back. Danielle and her colleague arrive at Star City in the Soviet Union.
17	7	"Don't Be Cruel"	Dennie Gordon	Nichole Beattie	April 2, 2021
Tensions rise between the US and Soviet Union. Before boarding a flight to Korea with Thomas Paine, Ellen gets a call saying her father has had a heart attack. She rushes to the hospital but he is already in recovery. She tells him that she is thinking of leaving NASA and joining the family's business when she gets a call from the White House about a downed jetliner. The flight is revealed to be Korean Air Lines Flight 007, which was fired on by a Soviet jet and destroyed, killing Paine and 268 other people. In the wake of this accident about which the Soviets reveal little information, Ellen is appointed acting director of NASA. Margo warns Sergei of faulty technology used by the Soviets via a coded message. Kelly investigates her birth parents, and Karen sells the Outpost to Tracy's new husband before kissing Danny and coming home to make love with Ed. While on the Moon, Tracy and the others take back their mining site.
18	8	"And Here's to You"	Dennie Gordon	Ronald D. Moore	April 9, 2021
The president asks Ellen to be the permanent head of NASA. She is conflicted as she tells Pam that she is more important to her. Molly is privately diagnosed with incurable normal tension glaucoma as a result of radiation exposure during the earlier solar storm, which will blind her. Pathfinder has missiles installed, and the crew perform weapons testing. Kelly finds her biological father and half-sister working in a restaurant, but does not reveal her identity. Gordo arrives on the Moon and tells Tracy what really happened when Danielle broke her arm. The Buran is discovered to have the same O-ring problem as the U.S. shuttles, and Margo and Sergei become closer. Aleida embarrasses Bill, who resigns and she apologizes by revealing her personal history to him. Danny and Karen kiss again and make love, but she tells him it is a one-time fling. The U.S. Marines at the lunar mine detect two cosmonauts installing some equipment. In a misunderstanding they kill one and badly wound the other.
19	9	"Triage"	Sergio Mimica-Gezzan	Bradley Thompson & David Weddle	April 16, 2021
In retaliation for the killing of the cosmonaut, the Soviets launch Buran to the Moon where it could threaten Jamestown base and any arriving spacecraft. In response, NASA launches the Pathfinder mission ahead of time, with instructions to "intercede" if necessary. Despite the tensions, the two vehicles for the Apollo-Soyuz mission are launched. Karen confesses her adultery to Ed, and says she wants them to have marriage counseling. Molly and Wayne argue about the experimental treatment she wants to get for her glaucoma. She eventually decides against the treatment. After realizing that she is an obstacle to Ellen's promising political career, Pam tells Ellen she is returning to her old girlfriend. Two cosmonauts visit Jamestown to see their injured comrade who is still unconscious. They retrieve their dead comrade's remains. The injured cosmonaut wakes up later and when told he is in Jamestown declares that he wishes to defect. Later, the Jamestown crew see a cosmonaut shoot a hole in one of their windows, causing severe depressurization and the death of one astronaut. Several armed cosmonauts enter Jamestown base.
20	10	"The Grey"	Sergio Mimica-Gezzan	Matt Wolpert & Ben Nedivi	April 23, 2021
Amid rising tensions with the Soviets, the Apollo–Soyuz crews are told to repeatedly delay their docking, to Danielle's frustration. Houston is unaware that the Soviets attacked Jamestown. Gordo and Tracy hide in the galley, and send Houston a signal which Aleida notices. The U.S. Marines and the cosmonauts engage in a firefight, resulting in two deaths on both sides and unseen damage to the Jamestown nuclear reactor's cooling system. Houston, Gordo and Tracy hatch a plan to fix the reactor from outside, using temporary suits they construct from duct tape. Danielle disobeys Houston's order to abandon the Apollo–Soyuz mission, and the astronauts and cosmonauts greet each other. This public gesture of friendship defuses the nuclear tension on Earth. Meanwhile Pathfinder and Buran nearly launch missiles at each other in lunar orbit, but Ed decides to destroy the Sea Dragon supply ship instead. Tracy and Gordo save the reactor from melting down, but die from vacuum exposure. The Soviets leave Jamestown. On Earth, the Soviets use Sergei to try to get classified information from Margo. In 1995, a human is walking on the surface of Mars.

=== Season 3 (2022) ===
No. overall	No. in season	Title	Directed by	Written by	Original release date
21	1	"Polaris"	Sarah Boyd	Matt Wolpert & Ben Nedivi	June 10, 2022
It is now 1992. Karen and Ed have divorced, and Karen is launching an orbital space hotel, Polaris, with Sam Cleveland. Ed and Danielle are attending Danny's wedding on Polaris with their new spouses. Ellen (now a senator) is running for president as the Republican nominee against Bill Clinton and the space race continues, this time to Mars. Molly, now completely blind, is in charge of the astronaut program and must choose between Ed or Danielle to lead the Mars expedition. Margo is head of NASA and she and Sergei secretly help each other with their respective space programs. Unbeknownst to Margo, Sergei is under orders from his Soviet superiors to extract information. Aleida is working on new rocket engines for the Mars mission, and is notified by Margo that she will go to the Moon to oversee its development. Space junk from a failed North Korean rocket damages a thruster on Polaris, causing its spin to accelerate and risking tearing the hotel apart. Ed is injured in the ensuing evacuation attempt, and Sam is killed, but Danny manages to save Polaris after performing a space walk to shut off the damaged thruster.
22	2	"Game Changer"	Sarah Boyd	David Weddle & Bradley Thompson	June 17, 2022
Karen sells Polaris to Dev Ayesa, the founder of Helios Aerospace, which wants to use it in their own commercial Mars mission. At NASA, Molly offers their first crewed Mars mission to Ed, with Danielle as backup commander. As Karen packs her things at Polaris, Danny Stevens comes to see her and admits he still loves her. Ellen announces Governor Jim Bragg, an evangelical governor as her presidential running mate. Molly's choice of Ed enrages Margo, who fires Molly on the spot and appoints Danielle instead. Ed angers Danielle by implying she only got the job because of her race and gender. Karen goes to Helios to convince Dev that Ed should lead their mission. Dev agrees and also offers Karen a job, which she accepts. Dev blindsides NASA by announcing live on TV that Helios will repurpose Polaris as Phoenix to be the first to reach Mars with Ed as its mission commander.
23	3	"All In"	Wendey Stanzler	Nichole Beattie	June 24, 2022
Kelly returns from Antarctica and asks Danielle for the biologist's position on NASA's crew, and she agrees. Danny goes drinking and is arrested, causing Danielle to remove him from the mission, but Ed calls and gives him a position on Phoenix before Danny is forced to admit his troubles to his wife Amber. Sergei gets closer to Margo, but is forced to ask her for NASA's nuclear engine design as the Soviet design does not work. She refuses, but KGB agents blackmail her and threaten to kill Sergei. Karen offers Aleida a job at Helios, but she declines and becomes NASA's flight director. Bill Strausser joins Helios as flight director. Two years later, Ellen is President of the United States and all three missions have left for Mars – Phoenix from Earth orbit, Sojourner 1 from Jamestown, and the Soviet Mars-94 from Baikonur.
24	4	"Happy Valley"	Wendey Stanzler	Joe Menosky	July 1, 2022
In deep space, all three spacecraft are headed toward Mars, with Phoenix far ahead. Sojourner 1 overtakes them by deploying solar sails. On Earth, Dev is furious and insists first place is the only thing that matters, pressuring his staff to find a way for Phoenix to make it to Mars first. Ellen visits NASA. During her visit, the Soviets perform a dangerous burn to reclaim the lead that causes their nuclear engines to go into meltdown. Ed insists on helping but is overruled by Dev, who locks the crew out of the ship's controls, forcing NASA to mount a rescue. During the rendezvous, a Mars-94 fuel tank bursts, propelling it toward Sojourner. Two astronauts and one cosmonaut are killed as Sojourner attempts to pull away.
25	5	"Seven Minutes of Terror"	Andrew Stanton	Sabrina Almeida	July 8, 2022
The Sojourner and Mars-94 crews bury their dead comrades in space. Sergei has been tortured in a KGB prison, but Margo gets him to Houston in return for giving the Soviets some of Sojourner's mission resources. Phoenix removes Helios's flight control lock, angering Dev. Karen resigns from Helios in disgust at their refusal to aid Mars-94. Aleida discovers the Soviet engines are copies of the American engines. Danny learns the password to let him listen to the video messages that Karen and Ed are sending each other. Phoenix arrives at Mars followed by Sojourner. Kelly and cosmonaut Alexei Poletov kiss. Phoenix attempts to land one of its skiffs but Ed aborts the landing due to poor visibility. Danielle successfully lands Sojourner on Mars. Danielle and the Soviet commander, Kuznetsov, wrestle each other to be first on Mars and appear to fall on the Mars surface together simultaneously.
26	6	"New Eden"	Andrew Stanton	Stephanie Shannon	July 15, 2022
The Soviets and Americans are uneasily sharing the American Happy Valley base. The Helios team has also landed and have their own base. As the rough landing left Sojourner 1 unable to fly again, all three crews will be returning to Earth on the Phoenix. After Danny hurts himself during drilling and is given Vicodin, he begins stealing stronger pain meds. Margo asks the US military to help Sergei to defect. Karen rejoins the Helios team as chief operating officer. Tensions rise when American astronaut Will Tyler reveals in a broadcast that he is gay, causing Baranov to worry that he will catch HIV. Kelly and Alexei have sex at the American base. Ellen takes advantage of Will's story by issuing an executive order that no US military personnel can be forced to reveal their sexuality. The Soviets have discovered liquid water, and hire Helios to help them drill for it while keeping it secret from NASA. Sergei tips off Margo that they have found the water on Mars. A partner of Larry's is indiscreet to a reporter about their homosexual relationship.
27	7	"Bring It Down"	Dan Liu	Nichole Beattie	July 22, 2022
The Soviet team in Houston relocate to Helios, and Sergei is returned to the Soviet Union. Larry lies under oath about his affair with a congressional aide, and tells Ellen that Pam left her because of her career. On Helios Base the teams prepare to drill even though Kelly insists the core samples have not been fully checked for microbial life. Danny's drug problem worsens, and Ed removes him from the drilling mission. Aleida suspects Margo leaked the engine designs to the Soviets. Jimmy and Sunny steal a NASA access card, which Sunny and her friends use to steal the statue of Gordo and Tracy. Ellen later visits Pam. Danny turns off communications with the drilling team, which results in injuries to Ed, Isabel, and the collapse of the cliff above Helios Base.
28	8	"The Sands of Ares"	Dan Liu	Joe Menosky & Eric Phillips	July 29, 2022
Alexei and Louisa Mueller escape on foot to Happy Valley. Ellen tells Pam she is the love of her life. Nick Corrado and Isabel Castillo have both been killed. Ed and Danny are trapped in the airlock of a buried Hab 1, and Ed is given uncomfortable news about Shane. Happy Valley's Rover 1 finds Hab 1's beacon. NASA, Helios and the Soviets in Houston work to develop a plan to reach Hab 1. Dev comes up with an idea to use explosives in a lava tube to clear out the debris around Hab 1. Jimmy confronts Karen about Danny. Tyler and Baranov set the charges, and Ed and Danny are rescued. Alexei has a subdural hematoma, and dies despite getting a blood transfusion from Kelly. During the transfusion, Mayakovsky realizes Kelly is pregnant.
29	9	"Coming Home"	Craig Zisk	David Weddle & Bradley Thompson	August 5, 2022
Five months later the survivors at Happy Valley are repairing the MSAM and making the fuel to return to Phoenix. As the MSAM's docking electronics are broken, Danielle and Kuznetsov drive 89 km to salvage a compatible board from a Democratic People's Republic of Korea probe. Aleida and Bill agree that Margo is likely responsible for giving the Soviets the NASA engine design; Bill goes to the FBI to Aleida's disgust. Amidst mounting financial troubles, the Helios board decides to replace Dev as CEO with Karen and sell Phoenix to NASA. To forestall the political crisis created by Larry and her potential impeachment, Ellen reveals she is lesbian in a press conference. Kelly collapses from pre-eclampsia. Danielle and Kuznetsov discover an armed North Korean astronaut at the probe site who threatens them.
30	10	"Stranger in a Strange Land"	Craig Zisk	Matt Wolpert & Ben Nedivi	August 12, 2022
In a flashback, the North Korean capsule crash lands on Mars in 1995, killing one crew member and leaving Lee Jung-Gil as the first man on Mars, stranded and low on supplies. He is eventually discovered by Danielle and Kuznetsov, who take him to Happy Valley. Vice President Bragg confronts Ellen, demanding her resignation to avoid impeachment, which Ellen refuses. Meanwhile, Margo faces scrutiny from the FBI. Kelly's pre-eclampsia necessitates an urgent return to Phoenix, involving a perilous spacewalk. The narrative also follows Sergei and his family defecting to the US, and a tragic bombing at the Johnson Space Center by Jimmy's radical friends, resulting in numerous deaths including Karen and Molly. Ed miraculously survives a crash landing in the MSAM, and Kelly safely gives birth. Following a confession from Danny about his role in a drilling accident, he is exiled to live in the abandoned North Korean capsule. The story arc concludes with Ellen reuniting with Pam, Molly being honored for her bravery with the Space Center renamed after her, Sergei adapting to life in suburban America, and a glimpse of Margo residing in the Soviet Union in 2003.

=== Season 4 (2023–24) ===
No. overall	No. in season	Title	Directed by	Written by	Original release date
31	1	"Glasnost"	Lukas Ettlin	Matt Wolpert & Ben Nedivi	November 10, 2023
In 2003, the Martian base Happy Valley has grown and a mission is underway to push an asteroid into Mars' orbit for mining, using a spacecraft commanded by Ed Baldwin. The tether between the two is compromised, killing Kuznetsov and a fellow crew member, and the mission is aborted. Margo, living in the Soviet Union, has a dull life but is promised consultation on space activities. After hearing about the accident, she visits Star City to speak to the Soviet's space director, but is rebuffed. Aleida is still in mission control, but is suffering from panic attacks due to trauma from the Johnson Space Center bombing. Unemployed oil rig worker Miles Dale applies for a job at Helios on the Moon, but the wait is too long for his monetary needs, so he volunteers for an available trip to Mars instead, which while it pays more has a longer rotation. The current NASA administrator, former businessman Eli Hobson, asks the retired Danielle Poole to return to Mars as Happy Valley's new commander. Danielle accepts and departs with Miles and a crew for Mars, where Ed Baldwin experiences hand tremors.
32	2	"Have a Nice Sol"	Lukas Ettlin	David Weddle & Bradley Thompson	November 17, 2023
Danielle and Miles arrive on Mars to different welcomes. Miles' original job working with fuels has been delayed due to the asteroid accident, so he is assigned to environmental repair. His quarters are cramped, shared, underground, and with low-bandwidth communications and lousy food. His first paycheck includes several deductions for his supplies, cutting his take-home pay to below his pay on Earth. Danielle asks about the communications issues caused by a satellite problem, and Ed says Earth told them to wait for a new satellite instead of attempting repairs; she countermands that order. Kelly Baldwin gets her science funding cut and meets up with a still-struggling Aleida. After a night of drinking, they decide to go into corporate-funded research. With comms repaired on Mars, most of the crew enjoys a live sports broadcast. Miles is introduced to the thriving bar and black market. In the Soviet Union, Margo notices changes such as a lack of news on TV, her phone being unusable, and the surveillance on her disappears. She sees the police forcibly closing down a newspaper stand, and is arrested while trying to intervene on its owner's behalf.
33	3	"The Bear Hug"	Dan Liu	Andrew Black	November 22, 2023
An attempt at a conservative coup d'état takes place in the USSR. Miles uses his access card to help the black marketeers, and turns himself a tidy profit. Margo is harshly interrogated about who she is and how she has an important KGB phone number in her possession. Kelly and Aleida pitch their biology project to multiple companies without success. They go to former Helios CEO Dev, who sees a way to help them and himself. Ed's tremors prevent him from completing a maneuver, but his co-pilot Svetlana assists. When she complains about pain in her side, he shows her his illicit marijuana farm in the greenhouse. Miles breaks the still at the bar while trying to improve its functionality, then hatches a plan to get alcohol flowing again by stealing a part from the refrigerator in the North Korean compound. After Jung-Gil catches Miles in the act, Miles introduces him to the black marketeers. Jung-Gil asks them to smuggle his wife from North Korea to Happy Valley. Margo's interrogation ends abruptly, and she is trucked to a spot on a frozen road in Star City where the new head of Roscosmos asks her to work there.
34	4	"House Divided"	Dan Liu	Sabrina Almeida	December 1, 2023
Tensions rise in Happy Valley over the Soviet power struggle on Earth. Svetlana injures a well-connected technician and the Soviet Union demands she be sent back to Earth to face trial. NASA and Danielle resist this, raising tensions between the superpowers. Miles sends a Mars rock home to his daughter, and a jeweler pays the family $5,000 for it. Miles' wife points out the opportunity, but his black marketeer is not interested, seeing it as too risky. Miles signs out a spacesuit to go himself, but he falls in a ravine, trapping and injuring himself. Sam rescues him. Margo reviews the Soviet accident report from the asteroid incident, and finds that Roscosmos-produced bolts were not built to the proper standard, which the report writer knew but didn't mention; he is taken away by the KGB. Ed makes a final plea to keep Svetlana on Mars, but a compromise deal has been struck for her to face trial in India instead of the Soviet Union. Ed walks her to the airlock amidst a group of angry workers.
35	5	"Goldilocks"	Sylvain White	Jovan Robinson	December 8, 2023
An asteroid is discovered swinging away from Jupiter towards Mars. Density measurements show it to be heavy in metals, especially iridium which makes it valuable to the base and humanity. President Gore claims he discovered the asteroid, causing diplomatic and political complications. The Mars team is tasked with a tight schedule to pull the asteroid into Mars orbit. Miles is doing well with his Mars rock smuggling, but his partner figures out what's going on. Dev decides to go to Mars, leaving Aleida behind to run Helios and taking Kelly with him so she can train her crews en route. Kelly has second thoughts about going, not wanting to leave her son, and she asks to take him on the mission. Dev agrees, partly because his mother abandoned him. During a training mission, a crew member sees Ed Baldwin's tremor and reports it to Danielle. She confronts him about the condition. When he argues with her, she removes him from flight status and as XO. A series of flashbacks show Danielle's series of visits to the exiled Danny as his condition deteriorates until he eventually commits suicide on the surface of Mars.
36	6	"Leningrad"	Sylvain White	Eric Phillips	December 15, 2023
The Mars 7 meetings get started in the Soviet Union. Margo is monitoring them and spots Aleida among the attendees. Aleida describes the costs for mining the asteroid as $2tn, and says the asteroid may be worth $20tn over decades' time. In backroom discussions involving the US, Helios, and the Soviets, the team hits on the idea of bringing the asteroid to Earth instead of Mars. Margo is remotely helping the Soviet negotiator, but is frustrated by the arrangement. She proposes working with Aleida directly, which will expose her defection but allow them to solve the problem. At first, Aleida is elated to learn Margo is alive, but her mood darkens as she hears Margo's story. On Mars, Ed is bored now that he's not XO. He goes to Ilya's unauthorized bar, saying he already knew it (and the wider black market) existed. Miles finds himself closed out of the black market, so with the North Koreans' help he takes it over. Ed, who is still a Helios manager, uses his knowledge of pay changes to incite the Mars workers into calling for a strike. Both planets watch as Margo is re-introduced as the manager of the Soviet asteroid capture program.
37	7	"Crossing the Line"	Maja Vrvilo	Andrew Black	December 22, 2023
Union negotiations have dragged on for 7 days and both sides are frustrated. After NASA and ROSCOSMOS order the non-Helios leadership to restart fuel production, the strikers sabotage efforts. Margo is ordered back to the US (with diplomatic immunity) to finalize asteroid capture plans. Aleida is ambushed in an interview about Margo and reacts strongly. Dev, Kelly and Alex arrive on Mars to a mixed welcome. The command team has to get creative to restart propellant production, but a botched repair job causes an explosion, a death, and several serious injuries. NASA deputizes former military crew members on Mars and cracks down on the base, while Dev offers several concessions to the strikers, splitting them and ending the strike. Aleida tries to get Margo's diplomatic immunity revoked, but her request is denied and Margo arrives in Houston. Dev approaches Ed with an idea to steal the asteroid that is the source of the conflict.
38	8	"Legacy"	Maja Vrvilo	Bradley Thompson & David Weddle	December 29, 2023
Sergei, living as a physics teacher in the United States, receives news that Margo is alive and returning to the country. The Mars black market is shut down by Palmer. Ed reluctantly agrees to take care of Alex for three days as Kelly travels to Korolev Crater with her seekers, then enlists another crew member as a babysitter. Dev reveals an ambitious plan to divert the asteroid's course to Mars using a new OpsCom built by the remaining strikers. Dev manages to secure Sam's spot on the mission to replace a discriminator crucial to the diversion plot. Sergei approaches Aleida to tell her the reason why Margo defected, asking Aleida to help him speak to Margo. When the discriminator is accidentally misplaced and the only way to reach it is through a small vent, Ed enlists Alex to retrieve it owing to his small size. Aleida gives Margo a coded note which Margo uses to meet Sergei at a restaurant. He warns her not to return to the Soviet Union, telling her that her employer, the head of Roscosmos, orchestrated their friendship years ago to compromise her, ruining both their lives.
39	9	"Brazil"	Sergio Mimica-Gezzan	David Weddle & Bradley Thompson & Kate Burns	January 5, 2024
Sam breaks the discriminator, forcing Ranger to replace it, allowing Dev's team access to Ranger and an opportunity to bring Goldilocks into Mars orbit, instead of Earth. Jung-Gil pledges North Korean support for the operation, promising to ensure that no one gets caught. An American espionage device is found aboard the North Korean module. The North Koreans demand Poole launch an investigation and accidentally reveal Miles Dale as a suspect. Sergei, Aleida, and Margo share dinner, discussing plans to expedite Goldilocks' financial returns. Once Aleida and her family retire to their bedrooms, Sergei offers Margo a plan to escape to Brazil and help their space program. The heads of NASA and Roscosmos discover several lost redundant parts, promptly forcing an investigation by both CIA and KGB operatives aboard Happy Valley, who violently interrogate Miles. Ed reveals to Kelly his fears of retirement, and Kelly asks about his work with Dev. The North Korean commander investigates the OpsCom built by Dev's team, but is knocked out and choked by Lee. Sergei is shot and his death is framed as an apparent suicide.
40	10	"Perestroika"	Sergio Mimica-Gezzan	Matt Wolpert & Ben Nedivi	January 12, 2024
As all parties prepare for the Goldilocks burn, Aleida discovers Sergei has been murdered and informs a devastated Margo, who suspects Irina. On Mars, security forces raid the hijackers' base after coercing Miles, but Dev helps most of the group escape. When Houston blocks their initial hacking attempt, the hijackers initiate a backup plan. Sam performs an EVA to manually prolong the burn while Margo and Aleida covertly sabotage Houston's attempts to regain control, successfully forcing the asteroid into Mars' orbit. Margo takes the sole blame to protect Aleida and is arrested. Meanwhile, Ilya frees Miles, sparking a massive riot between Mars workers and security forces. Ed and Dani attempt to intervene, but the violence only halts when Dani is accidentally shot. In the aftermath, the abuse of Mars detainees is exposed, Irina faces a Soviet investigation, and Lee's wife arrives on Mars with other North Korean refugees. Dani recovers and returns to her family on Earth. A flash-forward to 2012 reveals Goldilocks is now an extensive, thriving mining operation named Kuznetsov Station.

=== Season 5 (2026) ===
No. overall	No. in season	Title	Directed by	Written by	Original release date
41	1	"First Light"	Sarah Boyd	Matt Wolpert & Ben Nedivi	March 27, 2026
In 2012, the Mars base has expanded significantly, housing 5,000 people. Many of them are "craters" who arrived illegally in cargo shipments and were given asylum. Mars-6 nations have been hoarding the wealth from iridium mining; Brazil and China have created the ISN, as an alternative. Ed now has cancer and is living under house arrest, but has founded a Martian independence movement. Aleida has been promoted to the CEO of Helios, which is currently attempting to find traces of extraterrestrial life on Mars and Titan. Helios is competing with Kuragin, which has been managing construction work on the Martian surface. Dev presents plans to build a self-sustaining city on the planet which interferes with the funding for these projects. Alex has just graduated from high school and got a motorcycle as a gift from Dev. After crashing it, he finds a dead body, identified as Yoon Tae-Min, and it is ruled a murder. Stunned by the news, Aleida visits Margo in prison who gives her advice. After the autopsy, Jung-Gil's DNA is found on the dead body, and he is arrested.
42	2	"The Hard Six"	Sarah Boyd	Bradley Thompson & David Weddle	April 3, 2026
Jung-Gil is arrested by the Mars Peacekeepers, and is scheduled to be sent to Earth for a trial. Helios detects organic compounds on the surface of Titan, leading Kelly to push for a crewed mission. Dev and Aleida are enthusiastic, and select Kelly as the pilot. Alex and Lily share their opposition to the plan to return Jung-Gil to Earth. Alex's enthusiasm for Jung-Gil's cause motivates him to attend the next SDM meeting. At a meeting between Ed and Dev, Ed reveals that Svetlana was killed in prison on Earth, and warns that the same could happen to Jung-Gil. Dev insists that the trial will go well for him. Celia investigates Tae-Min's murder and Kuragin's suspicious activity at Happy Valley, but her security force partner Fred tries to divert her attention, and the company denies such activities. Ed and a few others devise a plan to take Jung-Gil out of the Peacekeepers' custody. He pilots a hopper to the ISN base and lands, where Jung-Gil runs to the airlock and enters the base. Ed loses consciousness due to the lower pressure in the hopper.
43	3	"Home"	Meera Menon	Nina Braddock	April 10, 2026
In the aftermath of the incident with Jung-Gil, ISN grants him asylum. Martian security starts rounding up his friends. Kelly and Alex learn the extent of Ed's cancer diagnosis. Ed experiences flashbacks from Korea where he was wounded and a fellow pilot was killed. Ed and Kelly fight when she attempts to step back from the mission to Titan in order to care for him. Aleida learns that Kuragin plans to send a ship that gets there before them; the only way to beat them is to reactivate Sojourner 1. Celia tries to uncover more about Kuragin's informal business, is attacked in the process and hospitalized. Ed and his family bond in Ilya's Bar before retiring to quarters, safe in the knowledge Kelly will indeed go to Titan after all. As she inspects Sojourner 1, Ed dies peacefully with Alex by his side, experiencing a flashback with his friend Gordo Stevens, his late wife Karen and their late son Shane.
44	4	"Open Source"	Meera Menon	Sabrina Almeida	April 17, 2026
After Ed's death, Happy Valley's residents build a small memorial to him. Aleida lands on Mars and works to prepare for the mission. Alex begins his first job at Helios. Dev continues to plan the city of Meru, and after negative feedback from Alex, offers Alex a deal to improve the city with the ability for modifications. On Earth, Avery "A.J." Jarrett Stevens is in the Marines and applying to join the Off Planet Expeditionary Force. She ultimately gets in with Danielle's advice. The governor of Mars, Leonid Polivanov, faces requests from the Soviet government to increase unity on Mars after iridium shipment disruptions impact the Soviet economy. He decides to hold a celebration for the Titan mission's launch. Alex finds a strange file, which contains plans to automate Happy Valley and send 98% of people back to Earth. Kelly and the Titan crew launch on Sojourner. Alex and Lily leak the automation file to the shock of people on both worlds.
45	5	"Svoboda"	Sylvain White	Kira Snyder	April 24, 2026
In 2003, Irina (the former Roscosmos director) was sent to a labor camp where she was routinely tortured. She blackmails her jailers with their personal information and is set free. In 2012, Palmer, the top peacekeeper on Mars, has deduced Lily was behind the leak and threatens Miles with prison. Irina is on the delegation from Kuragin which arrives on Mars and meets with Helios. Dev tells them he knows the culprit. The next day, Dev berates Alex for his actions. Alex quits the job. Celia gets access to EVA logs and finds Fred in the records. Leonid tries to talk with protestors but is rebuffed, causing him to declare a base-wide curfew to shut them down. It turns out Fred was the disguised attacker who injured Celia, and he was also involved in intimidating Tae-Min, who died during the struggle. The peacekeepers attempt to break up a protest violating curfew, and a fight ensues. Outnumbered, they begin shooting people and retreat. The protesters reach the control center.
46	6	"No Sudden Moves"	Sylvain White	Colby Day	May 1, 2026
The armed hijackers, led by Gerardo (a work acquaintance of Miles), takes the Mars government hostage and blocks all inbound flights and communication. Miles is encouraged to negotiate with the hijackers and is joined by Celia. Lily and her mother ponder whether or not Alex has feelings for her. Celia tells the hijackers the locations of hidden weapons stockpiles. Avery reveals to Marcus, a teammate who grew up on Mars, who her biological father was. Aleida talks the hijackers into letting them re-establish control with the Titan mission. Dev is beat up while trying to get to the medical bay. Alex and Lily kiss when he regains consciousness. The hijackers decide it is more effective to stop exporting iridium to Earth instead of keeping everyone hostage and get Leonid to record a message saying so. U.S. President Jim Bragg responds saying they will instate a complete embargo on Mars.
47	7	"The Sirens of Titan"	Dan Liu	Jovan Robinson	May 8, 2026
Six months after launching, Kuragin's Titan lander fails its aerobraking maneuver and loses contact with Sojourner. Lily and Alex, now a couple, are working in the farm dome to produce food to offset the embargo. Dev is helping the now-former peacekeeper troops steal the base's rations supply and medicine, decreasing the rebel SDM government's popularity. The rebel government seeks to send people back to Earth. Irina suggests to Leonid he could be the next Soviet premier as the present Soviet government is collapsing. Alex is called by Lily to the dome early in the morning, expecting a sexual encounter. Instead, his co-workers have thrown him a surprise birthday party. Suddenly the domes are destroyed in a surprise attack by the peacekeepers. Sojourner's engine burns to enter Titan's atmosphere instead of going back home. Kelly assumes manual control and lands the ship on Titan, while the audio feed is broadcast over the base. The crew set foot on Titan.
48	8	"Brave New World"	Dan Liu	Nina Braddock & Kate Burns	May 15, 2026
Morale returns to Mars following the Titan landing but food continues dwindling. Irina and Leonid inform Miles of economic and political unrest on Earth caused by the embargo, and an incoming multinational force heading to forcibly retake control of Mars. Celia forms a militia of her own, called the "Happy Valley Corps" which Alex joins. Onboard the Earth military ship are Avery and Marcus. After the ship is detected, the rebels plan to destroy the Goldilocks asteroid's docking port. Kelly is promoted to mission commander and the Titan crew plans a hike to the probe's landing site. Celia and Leonid risk their lives to fly the explosives to Goldilocks through a dust storm, but the Earth forces have beat them there. They start the countdown not knowing they are already there, and blow up the Goldilocks platform, killing one of Avery's colleagues in the process.
49	9	"Sons and Daughters"	Sergio Mimica-Gezzan	David Weddle & Bradley Thompson	May 22, 2026
The Titan crew retrieves samples from a crashed space probe. Marines land on Mars and start shooting indiscriminately at Martian civilians, with Lily recording video. The Titan team climbs a cliff for more samples, but team member Elena accidentally punctures her suit. Celia is found by her old boss and immediately gives up all her weapons, allowing them to get arrested. After saving someone's life with his med-training, Alex volunteers to get more medical supplies from Helios. Fred plays nice with the prisoners and lets them go while the other peacekeepers are distracted. The Marines are incompetent, accidentally killing Martian Peacekeepers, including Fred, getting lost inside the base, and messing up their orders. Marcus and Alex, both taking shortcuts through tunnels to their respective destinations, find each other. Alex shoots Marcus, but he survives long enough for Alex and Avery to drag him to Dev's front door.
50	10	"This Land Is Our Land"	Sergio Mimica-Gezzan	Matt Wolpert & Ben Nedivi & Kira Snyder	May 29, 2026
Leonid dupes M-6 forces into giving him access to their command center before it is set on fire. On Titan, one of the samples Kelly took is shown to contain microorganisms, and the trio celebrate, before realizing they're running out of oxygen. Kelly stays behind to let the other two survive. At Helios, Marcus is put in a stable condition. The SDM prepare an ambush of M-6 survivors. Aleida and Irina bypass the M-6 blackout to send a return trajectory to Sojourner-Titan. Messages reveal President Korzhenko has faced a coup, and that the M-6 has called for a ceasefire. Dev runs to Kuragin's space elevator, while Alex uses his motorcycle to inform both sides. Sojourner-Titan's discoveries become public and Mars becomes independent. Kelly walks out of her station to set down the "FOR ALL MANKIND" plaque, catching sight of bioluminescent bacteria in a lake nearby, spending her final moments walking into it. Zooming out, the camera moves to the long-abandoned Mars-94 in the year 2020, and a computer system inside the ship suddenly reactivates.

== Production ==
=== Development ===
First season promotional poster

According to Ronald D. Moore, the idea of the show came about during lunch with former NASA astronaut Garrett Reisman, when they discussed the possibility of an alternate history in which the Soviets reached the Moon before the Americans. In December 2017, it was announced that Apple had given the production a one-season series order. The series was created by Ronald D. Moore, Matt Wolpert, and Ben Nedivi. Maril Davis serves as executive producer alongside Moore, Wolpert, and Nedivi. Production companies involved with the series include Sony Pictures Television and Tall Ship Productions. In October 2018, it was announced that the series had been officially titled For All Mankind. The series was renewed for a second season in October 2019. In November 2020, it was announced that the second season would premiere in February 2021. In December 2020, ahead of the second-season premiere, Apple TV+ renewed the series for a third season. In July 2022, Apple TV+ renewed the series for a fourth season. In April 2024, the series was renewed for a fifth season. In March 2026, the series was renewed for a sixth and final season.

=== Casting ===
In August 2018, it was announced that Joel Kinnaman, Michael Dorman, Sarah Jones, Shantel VanSanten, and Wrenn Schmidt had been cast in main roles and that Eric Ladin, Arturo Del Puerto, and Rebecca Wisocky would appear in a recurring capacity. In October 2018, it was reported that Jodi Balfour had been cast in a series regular role.

In November 2020, Cynthy Wu, Coral Peña and Casey W. Johnson had been cast in main roles for the second season. Also, Krys Marshall and Sonya Walger were promoted to the main cast for the second season. In December 2020, Michaela Conlin joined the cast in a supporting role for the second season. In June 2021, it was reported that Edi Gathegi joined the season three cast as a series regular. For the fourth season, Daniel Stern, Toby Kebbell, Tyner Rushing and Svetlana Efremova were cast as series regulars. In July 2024, Mireille Enos and Costa Ronin were cast in series regular roles for the fifth season.

=== Filming ===
Principal photography for the series commenced in August 2018 in Los Angeles, California. In March 2019, The New York Times reported that filming had concluded. The filming for the second season began in December 2019. In August 2020, production on second season resumed after the COVID-19 halt, and the final two episodes were filmed. Filming for the third season began in February 2021, and concluded in mid-September 2021. Filming for the fourth season began in August 2022 and had concluded by January 2023. Filming for the fifth season began in July 2024. Filming for the sixth and final season concluded in August 2026.

== Music ==
All tracks written by Jeff Russo. The third- and fourth-season tracks were co-written by Paul Doucette.

=== Season 1 original soundtrack ===
No.	Title	Length
1.	"For All Mankind Main Title"	1:20
2.	"For All Jazz-Kind"	4:02
3.	"Race to the Moon (Piano Suite)"	6:11
4.	"Moon"	0:39
5.	"Heading for the Landing"	2:39
6.	"Heroes"	2:24
7.	"Hurry to Watch"	1:30
8.	"Karen and Ed"	1:26
9.	"Water, Pt. 1"	2:32
10.	"Moon Miss America"	3:42
11.	"Lower Molly"	3:08
12.	"Water, Pt. 2"	7:41
13.	"Questioned on Tape"	2:30
14.	"Ants"	3:08
15.	"Armed Booster / Another Ship"	10:43
16.	"Lonely Research"	3:01
17.	"Ellen and Deke In Trouble"	3:02
18.	"Career Over / No Russians"	1:49
19.	"Landing"	4:01
20.	"Smoke"	2:29
21.	"Von Braun"	2:19
22.	"Flight Director"	1:30
23.	"Lit Match"	1:39
24.	"Command Module Cobb"	1:02
25.	"Tribunal"	3:28
26.	"Woman on the Moon"	3:04

=== Season 2 original soundtrack ===
No.	Title	Length
1.	"Sunrise Transition"	4:23
2.	"Save Wubbo"	6:59
3.	"Molly and Ellen Leave Jamestown"	2:35
4.	"Shane's Old Room"	1:51
5.	"Baldwin Fight Aftermath"	4:48
6.	"Visiting the Ships"	2:01
7.	"The Donut Run"	3:29
8.	"Margot Jazz Trio Part Deux"	3:26
9.	"First Shot On the Moon"	3:39
10.	"Kelly Was a Heart Transplant"	2:37
11.	"Ed Rocks the Sim"	1:36
12.	"News of the Attack"	4:26
13.	"Dani and the Engineer"	6:43
14.	"Molly's Flight"	1:36
15.	"Tracy and Gordo landing"	2:21
16.	"Reaching For the Case"	4:54
17.	"Russians!"	5:07
18.	"Sea Dragon"	4:17
19.	"Here We Go"	1:51
20.	"Jamestown"	5:56
21.	"The Run"	5:11

=== Season 3 original soundtrack ===
No.	Title	Length
1.	"What We Can Build"	3:17
2.	"Extra Gravity"	3:28
3.	"Thrusters Firing"	1:50
4.	"Back in the Race"	2:42
5.	"Margo and Sergei"	4:34
6.	"Turning"	3:40
7.	"Ellen's Return"	2:05
8.	"Spaghetti Martian"	3:22
9.	"Messages"	3:09
10.	"Stranded"	2:22
11.	"Drilling"	2:48
12.	"Aleida's Wall"	2:55
13.	"Approaching Probe"	2:15
14.	"Mars"	2:10
15.	"Libra"	4:34
16.	"Wreckage"	3:33

=== Season 4 original soundtrack ===
No.	Title	Length
1.	"Montage"	3:25
2.	"Mars Colony"	1:33
3.	"Bullfinch"	1:58
4.	"Riot"	3:25
5.	"Eavesdropping"	2:40
6.	"Powdered Milk"	1:25
7.	"Changes Course"	3:02
8.	"Docking Procedure test"	1:55
9.	"Discriminator Install"	3:56
10.	"Floating Conflict"	5:20

== Release ==
The first season of For All Mankind premiered on Apple TV+ on November 1, 2019, and consisted of 10 episodes, released weekly until December 20, 2019. The second season premiered on February 19, 2021, and consisted of 10 episodes, released weekly until April 23, 2021. The third season premiered on June 10, 2022, and consisted of 10 episodes, released weekly until August 12, 2022. The fourth season premiered on November 10, 2023, and consisted of 10 episodes, released weekly until January 12, 2024. In January 2026, it was announced the fifth season would premiere on March 27, 2026, and consist of 10 episodes, releasing weekly until May 29, 2026.

=== Marketing ===
On February 11, 2021, ahead of the season two premiere, Apple released an augmented reality iOS application on the App Store called For All Mankind: Time Capsule. The application walks users through the decade-long gap between seasons one and two, showing the relationship between astronauts Gordo and Tracy Stevens, and their son Danny Stevens. At the 73rd Primetime Creative Arts Emmy Awards, For All Mankind: Time Capsule won an award for Outstanding Innovation in Interactive Programming.

For season two, Apple released a podcast titled For All Mankind: The Official Podcast, produced in partnership with At Will Media, released every two weeks starting February 19, 2021. It is hosted by Krys Marshall, who plays Danielle Poole, and features behind-the-scenes looks and interviews with scientists, former astronauts, and the cast and crew of For All Mankind.

For season three, Apple released a companion video series titled The Science behind For All Mankind for corresponding episodes from season 3. It is hosted by Wrenn Schmidt, who plays Margo Madison, and has her explain and break down the scientific topics shown on the series.

=== Home media ===
Seasons 1 and 2 received Region 2 DVD and Blu-ray releases in late 2022. In November 2023, Sony Pictures Home Entertainment released season 1 on Region 1 DVD and Blu-ray. Season 2 was released on Region 1 DVD and Blu-ray in March 2026.

== Reception ==
=== Critical response ===
Critical response of For All Mankind
Season	Rotten Tomatoes	Metacritic
1	75% (56 reviews)	65 (22 reviews)
2	100% (27 reviews)	75 (7 reviews)
3	94% (36 reviews)	84 (15 reviews)
4	100% (28 reviews)	83 (11 reviews)
5	90% (21 reviews)	83 (9 reviews)

The first season of For All Mankind received generally positive reviews. The review aggregator website Rotten Tomatoes reported a 75% approval rating based on 56 reviews with an average rating of 7/10. The website's critical consensus reads, "Though it shoots for the Moon and falls somewhere in orbit, For All Mankind's impressive vision of history has the potential for real liftoff if it leans into the things that set it apart instead of settling for more of the same." Metacritic, which uses a weighted average, assigned a score of 65 out of 100 based on 22 critics, indicating "generally favorable reviews".

The second season has a 100% approval rating on Rotten Tomatoes based on 27 reviews with an average rating of 7.6/10. The website's critical consensus reads, "For All Mankind's sophomore flight isn't without its hiccups, but compelling character work and a renewed sense of wonder make for thrilling viewing." On Metacritic, it has a weighted score of 75 out of 100 based on 7 reviews, indicating "generally favorable reviews".

The third season has a 94% approval rating on Rotten Tomatoes based on 36 reviews with an average rating of 7.9/10. The website's critical consensus reads, "For All Mankind's third season goes as far as Mars while maintaining a homey focus on its original ensemble, delivering another epic adventure with an intimate focus." On Metacritic, it has a weighted score of 84 out of 100 based on 15 reviews, indicating "universal acclaim".

The fourth season has a 100% approval rating on Rotten Tomatoes based on 28 reviews with an average rating of 8.2/10. The website's critical consensus reads, "Houston, there's no problem here – For All Mankind's fourth season hones in on what the series does best and forges ahead with a thought-provoking revisionist history." On Metacritic, it has a weighted score of 83 out of 100 based on 11 reviews, indicating "universal acclaim".

The fifth season has a 90% approval rating on Rotten Tomatoes based on 21 reviews with an average rating of 7.2/10. The website's critical consensus reads, "With smart storytelling, high ambition, and enough tension to keep viewers glued to their screen, For All Mankind remains one of television's most compelling sci-fi sagas." On Metacritic, it has a weighted score of 83 out of 100 based on 9 reviews, indicating "universal acclaim".

=== Accolades ===
Year	Award	Category	Nominee(s)	Result	Ref.
2019	IGN Awards	Best New TV Series	For All Mankind	Nominated	
2021	Primetime Creative Arts Emmy Awards	Outstanding Innovation in Interactive Programming	For All Mankind	Won	
2021	Saturn Awards	Best Fantasy Television Series	For All Mankind	Won	
2021	TCA Awards	Outstanding Achievement in Drama	For All Mankind	Nominated	
2022	Critics' Choice Television Awards	Best Drama Series	For All Mankind	Nominated	
2022	Golden Reel Awards	Outstanding Achievement in Sound Editing – Series 1 Hour – Comedy or Drama – Dialogue and ADR	Vince Balunas (for "And Here's to You")	Nominated	
2022	Hugo Award	Best Dramatic Presentation (Short Form)	Matt Wolpert, Ben Nedivi and Sergio Mimica-Gezzan (for "The Grey")	Nominated	
2022	Producers Guild of America Awards	PGA Innovation Award	For All Mankind: Time Capsule	Won	
2022	Saturn Awards	Best Science Fiction Series (Streaming)	For All Mankind	Nominated	
2022	Saturn Awards	Best Supporting Actor in a Streaming Series	Joel Kinnaman	Nominated	
2023	Critics' Choice Super Awards	Best Science Fiction/Fantasy Series	For All Mankind	Nominated	
2023	Hollywood Creative Alliance TV Awards	Best Supporting Actor in a Streaming Drama Series	Edi Gathegi	Nominated	
2023	Hugo Award	Best Dramatic Presentation (Short Form)	Matt Wolpert and Ben Nedivi (for "Stranger in a Strange Land")	Nominated	
2024	Art Directors Guild Awards	Excellence in Production Design for a One-Hour Fantasy Single-Camera Series	Seth Reed (for "The Bear Hug")	Nominated	
2024	Critics' Choice Super Awards	Best Science Fiction/Fantasy Series, Limited Series or Made-for-TV Movie	For All Mankind	Nominated	
2024	Primetime Creative Arts Emmy Awards	Outstanding Emerging Media Program	For All Mankind Season 3 Experience	Won	
2024	Set Decorators Society of America Awards	Best Achievement in Décor/Design of a One Hour Fantasy or Science Fiction Series	Kimberly Wannop, Laura Harper, Seth Reed	Nominated	
2025	Saturn Awards	Best Fantasy Television Series	For All Mankind	Nominated	

== Spin-off ==
In April 2024, a spin-off series centering on the Soviet space program titled Star City was announced to be in development. It premiered on Apple TV on May 29, 2026.
