= William Landay =

American novelist and former lawyer (born 1963)

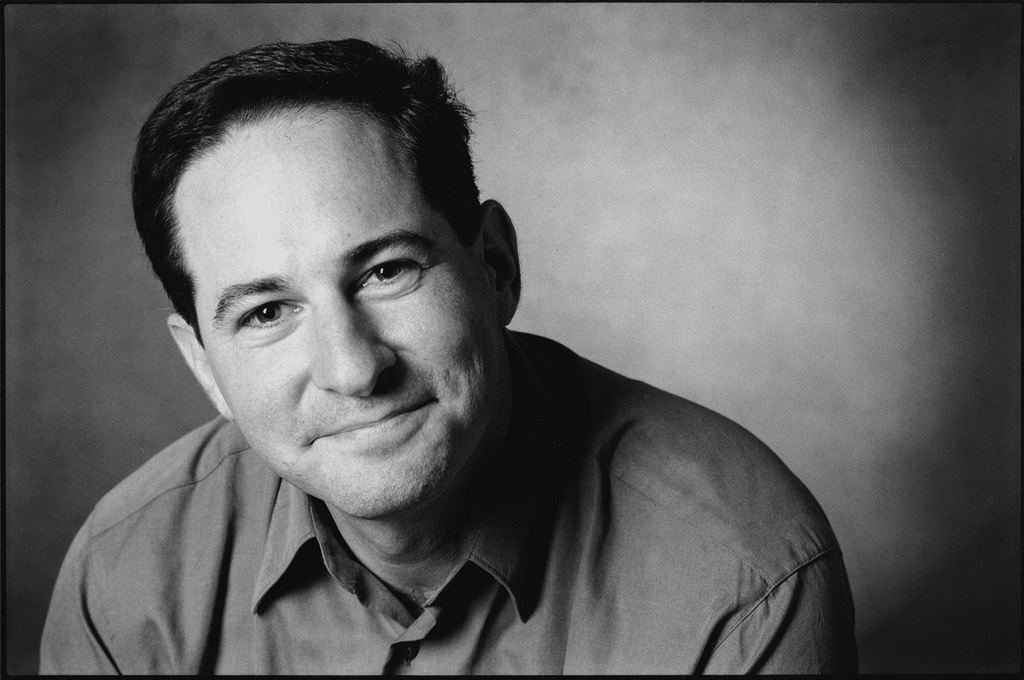
- Born: William Scott Landay; July 23, 1963 (age 63); Boston, Massachusetts, U.S.
- Education: Yale University (BA); Boston College (JD)
- Occupations: Lawyer, author
- Children: 2
- Writing career
- Genre: crime drama
- Notable awards: New Blood Dagger (best debut crime novel, 2003); Strand Magazine Critics Award (best mystery novel, 2012)
- Website: www.williamlanday.com

Signature
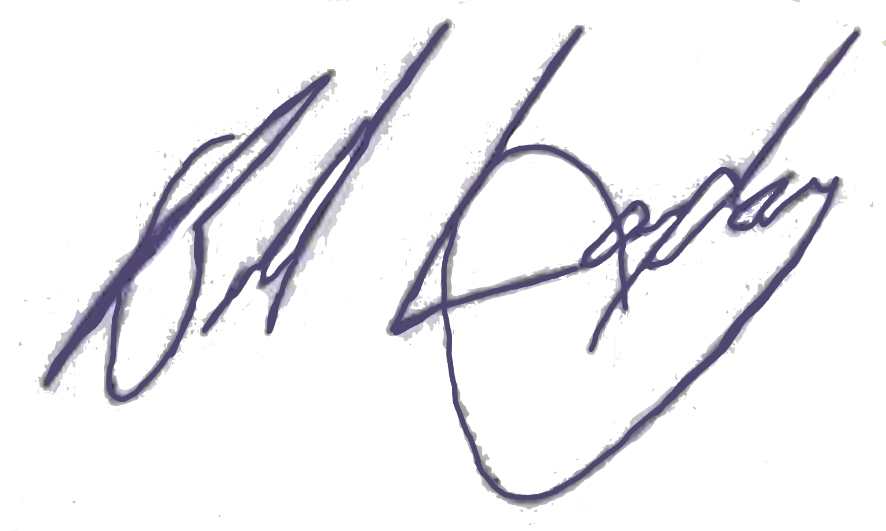

William Scott Landay (born July 23, 1963) is an American novelist and former lawyer.

== Early life and education ==
Landay graduated from the Roxbury Latin School in Boston, Yale University and Boston College Law School.

== Career ==
Prior to becoming a writer, Landay served for seven years as an Assistant District Attorney in Middlesex County, Massachusetts.

=== Novels ===
Landay's first novel, Mission Flats, was awarded the John Creasey Dagger (now called the New Blood Dagger) as the best debut crime novel of 2003 by the British Crime Writers' Association. His second novel, The Strangler, was shortlisted for the Strand Magazine Critics Award as the best crime novel of 2007.

Landay's third novel, Defending Jacob, was released in January 2012. It was well received by critics and became an immediate New York Times best seller. It was awarded the Strand Magazine Critics Award for best mystery novel of 2012, and was nominated for several other awards, including the Barry Award and the Hammett Prize, both for best crime novel; the International Thriller Writers Award for best thriller; the Harper Lee Prize for Legal Fiction; and the Goodreads Choice Award for both best mystery/thriller and best author. The book was later adapted into an eight-episode miniseries on Apple TV.

His fourth novel, All That Is Mine I Carry With Me, was released on February 6, 2024.

== Personal life ==
Landay, who is Jewish, lives with his wife and two sons in Boston.
