= Town Diner =

- U.S. National Register of Historic Places
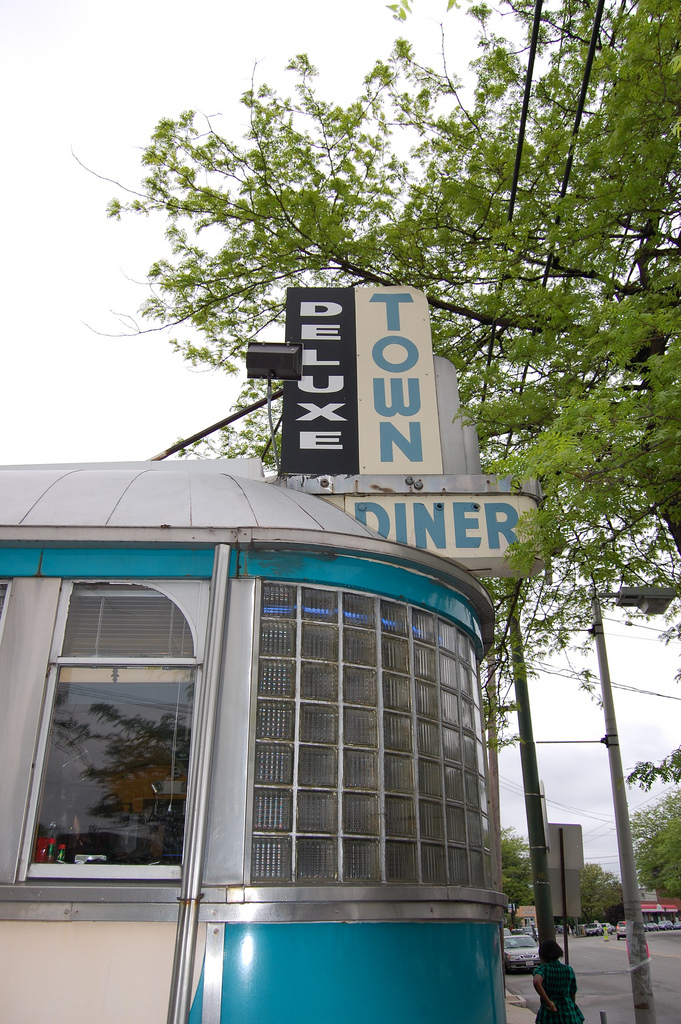
- Pictured in 2009

- Location within Massachusetts Location within the United States
- Location: 627 Mount Auburn St., Watertown, Massachusetts
- Coordinates: 42°22′15″N 71°9′31″W
- Built: 1947
- Architect: DeLoria; NDC Construction Company
- MPS: Diners of Massachusetts MPS
- NRHP reference No.: 99001127
- Added to NRHP: September 22, 1999

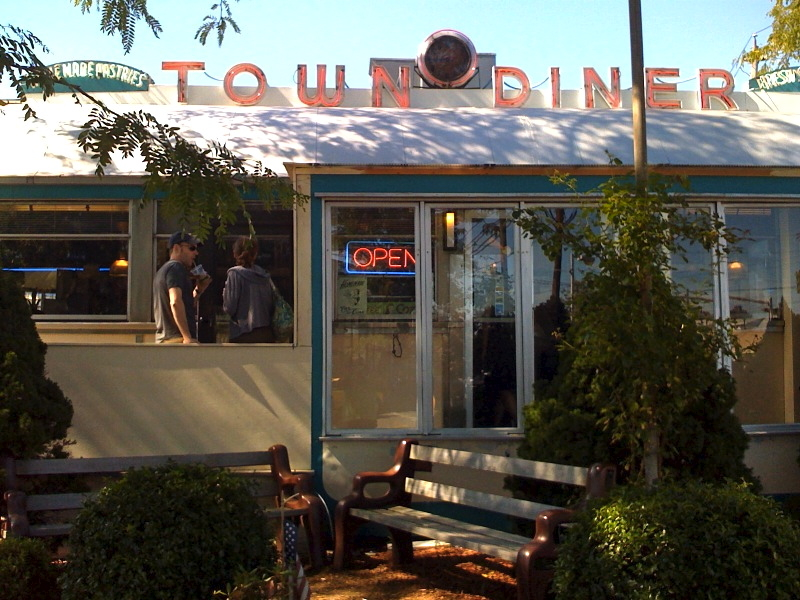
2012

The Deluxe Town Diner is a historic diner in Watertown, Massachusetts.

== History ==
This diner was manufactured on site, rather than having been prefabricated and shipped to the site from a specific diner manufacturer. In 1947, George Contos and his father built this diner around their earlier Worcester Lunch Car Company diner. The Worcester diner became the kitchen in the current building. The Town Diner's two-tone porcelain siding and its round glass-block corners combine architectural features of the Worcester and Paramount Diner manufacturers, respectively.

The diner was added to the National Register of Historic Places in 1999 as "Town Diner".

In 2000, the diner was purchased by new owners. They reinstalled the diner's original counter and booths, and restored the walls to their original appearance by removing paneling. The menu was also revamped.

The diner featured in a 2011 music video by Blue Man Group.

== See also ==
- National Register of Historic Places listings in Middlesex County, Massachusetts
