= Christopher Denham =

American actor, screenwriter, film director, and producer

- Denham in 2026
- Born: Blue Island, Illinois, U.S.
- Occupations: Actor; Writer; Film director
- Years active: 2003–present

Christopher Denham is an American actor and director. He is known for supporting roles in Oppenheimer, Shutter Island, Argo, Being the Ricardos, Charlie Wilson's War and Sound of My Voice. Television credits include For All Mankind, Billions, Shining Girls opposite Elisabeth Moss, and Amazon Prime's Utopia, created by Gillian Flynn. Denham has appeared on Broadway in Master Harold...and the Boys, Martin McDonagh's The Lieutenant of Inishmore, and David Mamet's China Doll, opposite Al Pacino. In 2025, he co-starred opposite George Clooney in the Broadway adaptation of Good Night and Good Luck, directed by David Cromer.

== Early life ==
Denham grew up on the south side of Chicago. He attended theater school at the University of Illinois at Urbana-Champaign for two years before finishing his degree in English literature and creative writing. Denham was a member of the Celebration Company at the Station Theatre in Urbana, IL during its existence from 1971 to 2021. While living in Urbana, he appeared at the Station Theatre in This Is Our Youth by Kenneth Lonergan (2000), American Buffalo by David Mamet (2001), and The Cripple of Inishmaan by Martin McDonagh (2002). In 2000, he co-directed and appeared in Sam Shepard's True West in a Penny Dreadful Players production at the historic Channing-Murray Foundation. He self-produced and directed his first play, In Film, in 2001 in a found space on the University of Illinois campus.

== Career ==
=== Professional theatrical career ===
Denham made his Broadway debut opposite Danny Glover in the Roundabout Theatre revival of "Master Harold"...and the Boys. Denham originated the role of Matt in the Steppenwolf Theatre production of Adam Rapp's Red Light Winter. The production moved to New York City where Denham won Outstanding Lead Actor at the 2006 Lucille Lortel Awards. His other Broadway credits include the title role in Martin McDonagh's The Lieutenant of Inishmore and David Mamet's China Doll, opposite Al Pacino. He co-starred opposite George Clooney in the Broadway production of Good Night and Good Luck, directed by David Cromer. Off-Broadway, Denham appeared at Playwright's Horizons in Adam Rapp's Kindness opposite Katherine Waterston, Charles Mee's Wintertime at Second Stage, and Steven Levenson's The Unavoidable Disappearance of Tom Durnin, opposite David Morse at Roundabout Theatre Company. Regionally, Denham has worked with the Illinois Shakespeare Festival, New York Stage and Film and the Sundance Lab for Directors and Screenwriters.

=== Film and television career ===
Denham's first major film role was as CIA paramilitary operations officer Mike Vickers in Charlie Wilson's War, directed by Mike Nichols. He starred opposite Brit Marling in the acclaimed psychological thriller Sound of My Voice which premiered at the Sundance Film Festival. His breakout film role was as Mark Lijek, one of the six escaped hostages rescued by Tony Mendez in Argo. Denham later portrayed scientist Jim Meeks on the Emmy-nominated AMC show, Manhattan. In 2017, he joined the cast of Billions as attorney Oliver Dake. He appeared as Sheriff Peter Trask in Craig Zobel's One Dollar, which premiered on CBS All Access. In 2020, he was a series regular in Gillian Flynn's Utopia as Arby. Denham has collaborated with directors Martin Scorsese (Shutter Island), Mike Nichols (Charlie Wilson's War), Barry Levinson (The Bay), Tony Gilroy (Duplicity), Jodie Foster (Money Monster), and Aaron Sorkin (Being the Ricardos). Other TV credits include Rubicon, Person of Interest, The Good Wife, Prodigal Son, Law & Order, Law & Order: Special Victims Unit, The Following, and The Hunting Party.

Denham wrote and directed the 2008 horror film Home Movie (IFC Films) which premiered at Toronto After Dark and for which he won the Citizen Kane Award for up-and-coming director at the Sitges Film Festival. He also wrote and directed the critically acclaimed thriller, Preservation, starring Wrenn Schmidt, Pablo Schreiber and Aaron Staton. which debuted at the Tribeca Film Festival and was distributed by The Orchard. In 2022, he directed the psychological thriller, Old Flame, which is distributed by Gravitas Ventures.

Denham plays the German spy Klaus Fuchs in Christopher Nolan’s film, Oppenheimer, for Universal Pictures, which was released in July 2023. In 2025, he joined the cast of Apple TV's For All Mankind. In 2027, he will appear in Tom McCarthy's The Statement, opposite Paul Rudd and Paul Giamatti.

== Filmography ==
=== Film ===
Year	Title	Role	Notes
2005	Headspace	Alex Borden	
2007	Blackbird	Clarke	
2007	Charlie Wilson's War	Mike Vickers	
2007	The Key to Reserva	Leonard	Short film
2008	El camino	Gray	
2008	Home Movie		Directorial debut
2009	Duplicity	Ronny Partiz	
2009	Alexander the Last	Actor	
2009	Bottleworld	Fred	
2010	Shutter Island	Peter Breene	
2010	Camp Hell	Christian	
2011	Sound of My Voice	Peter Aitken	
2011	Restive	Lott	
2011	Enter Nowhere	Kevin	
2012	Forgetting the Girl	Kevin Wolfe	
2012	Argo	Mark Lijek	Hollywood Film Awards for Ensemble of the Year; Palm Springs International Film Festival Award for Ensemble Cast Award; Screen Actors Guild Award for Outstanding Performance by a Cast in a Motion Picture; Nominated—Phoenix Film Critics Society Award for Best Cast; Nominated—San Diego Film Critics Society Award for Best Cast
2012	The Bay	Sam	
2014	Bad Country	Tommy Weiland	
2014	Preservation		As director
2015	Area 51		As writer
2016	Money Monster	Ron Sprecher	
2017	Camera Obscura	Jack Zeller	
2018	Fast Color	Bill	
2018	The Amaranth	Dr. Alan Campbell	
2021	Being the Ricardos	Donald Glass	
2023	The Adults	Scott	
2023	Night Shift	Walton Grey	
2023	Maggie Moore(s)	Andy Moore	
2023	Oppenheimer	Klaus Fuchs	
2023	Dogman	Ackerman	
2026	A Statement		

=== Television ===
Year	Title	Role	Notes
2003	Law & Order: Special Victims Unit	Joey Field	Episode: "Damaged"
2007	Law & Order	Gerald Stockwell	Episode: "Murder Book"
2007	Two Families	Greg	Television film
2010	Rubicon	Evan Hadas	Episode: "Keep the Ends Out"
2012	Person of Interest	Kyle Morrison	Episode: "Identity Crisis"
2013	Deception	Remy Colville	Episode: "Pilot"
2013	The Following	Vince McKinley	3 episodes
2013	The Good Wife	Trent	Episode: "What's in the Box?"
2014–2015	Manhattan	Jim Meeks	23 episodes
2017–2018	Billions	Oliver Dake	17 episodes
2017	The Blacklist: Redemption	Brian Mayhew	Episode: "Operation Davenport"
2018	One Dollar	Peter Trask	10 episodes
2020	Utopia	Arby	8 episodes
2021	Prodigal Son	Trevor Falvey	Episode: "Bad Manners"
2022	Shining Girls	Leo Jenkins	4 episodes
2023	The Gilded Age	Robert McNeil	4 episodes
2024	American Rust	Russell Wolfe	9 episodes
2026	For All Mankind	Walt Griebel	8 episodes
2026	The Hunting Party	Byron May	Season 2 Episode: "Byron May" Guest Star

=== Stage ===
Year	Title	Role	Notes
2003	"Master Harold"...and the Boys	Hally	Roundabout Theatre Company
2004	Wintertime	Jonathan	Second Stage Theater
2005	Red Light Winter	Matt	Steppenwolf Theatre
2006	Red Light Winter	Matt	Barrow Street Theater; 2006 Lucille Lortel Awards Outstanding Lead Actor (tie)
2006	cagelove	Playwright, Director	Rattlestick Playwrights Theater
2006	The Lieutenant of Inishmore	Mad Padraic	Lyceum Theatre
2008	Kindness	Dennis	Playwrights Horizons
2015	China Doll	Carson	Gerald Schoenfeld Theatre
2018	The Unavoidable Disappearance of Tom Durnin	James Durnin	Roundabout Theatre Company
2025	Good Night, and Good Luck	John Aaron	Winter Garden Theatre

== Awards and nominations ==
Year	Award	Category	Work	Result
2006	Lucille Lortel Awards	Outstanding Lead Actor	Red Light Winter	Won (tied)
2008	Sitges - Catalan International Film Festival	Citizen Kane Award for Best Directorial Revelation	Home Movie	Won
2012	Hollywood Film Awards	Ensemble of the Year (with John Goodman, Scoot McNairy, Ben Affleck, Alan Arkin, Kerry Bishé, Kyle Chandler, Tate Donovan, Rory Cochrane, Bryan Cranston, Clea DuVall, Victor Garber, Željko Ivanek, Titus Welliver, Bob Gunton, Philip Baker Hall, Richard Kind, Michael Parks, Christopher Stanley, Taylor Schilling)	Argo	Won
2013	Palm Springs International Film Festival	Ensemble Cast Award (with Ben Affleck, Bryan Cranston, Alan Arkin, John Goodman, Victor Garber, Tate Donovan, Clea DuVall, Scoot McNairy, Rory Cochrane, Kerry Bishé, Kyle Chandler, Chris Messina)	Argo	Won
