= Wrenn Schmidt =

American actress (born 1983)

- Schmidt in 2016
- Born: Melinda Wrenn Schmidt; February 18, 1983 (age 43); Lexington, South Carolina, U.S.
- Education: Southern Methodist University (BFA)
- Occupation: Actress
- Years active: 2006–present

Melinda Wrenn Schmidt (born February 18, 1983) is an American actress. She is best known for her starring role as NASA engineer, flight director, and later director of NASA Margo Madison in the Apple TV+ original science-fiction space drama series For All Mankind (2019–present). Her other television roles include Britney in the crime anthology series Accused S1 E9 (2023), Julia Sagorsky in the period drama series Boardwalk Empire (2012–2013), KGB handler Kate in the spy drama series The Americans (2014), Dr. Iris Campbell on the thriller series Person of Interest (2014–2016), and Megan Holter in the horror series Outcast (2016–2018). Her film roles include the horror film Preservation (2014), the biographical drama I Saw the Light (2015), the war film 13 Hours: The Secret Soldiers of Benghazi (2016), the romantic comedy The Good Catholic (2017), and the science-fiction horror film Nope (2022).

== Early life and education ==
Schmidt was born in Lexington, South Carolina. Her father is a biology professor, and her mother is a former dietitian. She comes from mixed European heritage; German from her father, including English, Scots-Irish, Polish, and Austrian, among others. She attended the residential high school South Carolina Governor's School for the Arts & Humanities in Greenville, graduating from their inaugural drama class in 2001. She attended Southern Methodist University's Meadows School of the Arts in University Park, Texas, graduating summa cum laude in 2005 with a B.F.A. in theatre studies and history. She had a part in the George F. Walker play Heaven, at Dallas' Kitchen Dog Theater in 2003. Schmidt moved to New York City to intern with an off-Broadway theatre company, and worked three jobs as she began auditioning for acting roles.

== Career ==
Schmidt was cast in Crazy for the Dog in 2006 by the Jean Cocteau Repertory. She served as an understudy in a national tour of Edward Albee's Who's Afraid of Virginia Woolf?, starring Bill Irwin and Kathleen Turner, directed by Anthony Page. The role led to her finding a talent agent, and to her first television appearances on NBC's Law & Order and CBS' 3 lbs in 2006. She appeared in the title role of Sive at the Irish Repertory Theatre in 2007, and was then an understudy in a revival of Come Back, Little Sheba on Broadway. In 2009, Schmidt appeared off-Broadway at the Harold Clurman Theatre as Cleopatra in Caesar and Cleopatra, at the Cherry Lane Theatre in Jailbait, and regionally in Proof at Cape May Stage.

Schmidt made her film debut in the 2010 documentary Client 9: The Rise and Fall of Eliot Spitzer, portraying a prostitute who refused to appear on camera. She had parts that year on NBC's Mercy, and in the play Phantom Killer, about the 1946 Texarkana Moonlight Murders. Schmidt made her feature film debut in Our Idiot Brother, a comedy-drama starring Paul Rudd, Elizabeth Banks, and Zooey Deschanel, which premiered at the 2011 Sundance Film Festival. She was cast in the play Be a Good Little Widow at Ars Nova, and in Teresa Deevy's Temporal Powers at Manhattan's Mint Theater in 2011. In 2012, Schmidt became a regular on the HBO Prohibition-era crime drama Boardwalk Empire, playing Julia Sagorsky. She played Ruth Atkins in the Eugene O’Neill play Beyond the Horizon, at the Irish Repertory Theatre.

Schmidt returned to the Mint Theater in 2013 to play the title character in Teresa Deevy's Katie Roche, and starred opposite John Turturro as Hilde Wangel in Henrik Ibsen's The Master Builder at the Harvey Theater. She had a number of recurring roles on television in 2014. She played Kate, a KGB handler, on the FX series, The Americans, for six episodes. She also played Jenna Olson on FX's Tyrant, and Dr. Iris Campbell on Person of Interest. Schmidt starred alongside Aaron Staton and Pablo Schreiber in the 2014 horror-thriller film Preservation, which was directed by Christopher Denham and premiered at the Tribeca Film Festival. She appeared in the 2015 Hank Williams biopic film I Saw the Light, starring Tom Hiddleston and Elizabeth Olsen. She played Bobbie Jett.

In 2016, Schmidt had a role opposite John Krasinski in the Michael Bay film 13 Hours: The Secret Soldiers of Benghazi, which portrays the 2012 Benghazi attack in Libya. She joined the cast of the Cinemax drama series, Outcast, based on a Robert Kirkman graphic novel about demonic possession. Schmidt appeared with Danny Glover and John C. McGinley in the independent romantic comedy The Good Catholic. Schmidt stars in Apple TV+ original series For All Mankind (2019–present), playing the central role of NASA engineer Margo Madison.

== Filmography ==
=== Film ===
Year	Title	Role	Notes
2010	The Necklace	Elizabeth	Short
2011	Javelina	Katie	
2011	Our Idiot Brother	Beth	
2013	How to Follow Strangers	Shelly	
2014	Preservation	Wit Neary	
2014	Mary and Louise	Marlene Dietrich	Short
2015	I Saw the Light	Bobbie Jett	
2016	13 Hours: The Secret Soldiers of Benghazi	Becky Silva	
2017	The Good Catholic	Jane	
2022	Nope	Amber Park	
2023	The Starling Girl	Heidi Starling	
2025	Nuremberg	Elsie Douglas	
2025	Stitches	Gillian	Short
2025	Xeno	Linda Rowan	
2026	Imprint	Flora Grant	Short

=== Television ===
Year	Title	Role	Notes
2006	Law & Order	Jill Cariglia	"Release"
2006	3 lbs	Female Student	"Heart Stopping"
2010	Mercy	Sarah	"Can We Talk About the Gigantic Elephant in the Ambulance?"
2010	Client 9: The Rise and Fall of Eliot Spitzer	Angelina	Documentary
2011	Body of Proof	Rena Talbot	"Missing"
2012	Blue Bloods	Anna Goodwin	"Mother's Day"
2012–2013	Boardwalk Empire	Julia Sagorsky Harrow	Recurring role
2014	The Americans	Kate	Recurring role
2014	Tyrant	Jenna Olson	Recurring role
2014	Unforgettable	Vicki Wilson	"Admissions"
2014–2016	Person of Interest	Dr. Iris Campbell	Recurring role
2016	Outcast	Megan Holter	Main role
2018	The Looming Tower	Diane Marsh	Main role
2018	Elementary	Ellory	2 Episodes ("You've Come a Long Way, Baby"; "The Last Bow")
2019–present	For All Mankind	Margo Madison	Main role
2023	Accused	Britney Thoms	"Jack's Story"
