= Intensity (novel) =

1995 novel by Dean Koontz

- First edition (UK)
- Author: Dean Koontz
- Cover artist: J. James
- Language: English
- Genre: Suspense novel, Horror novel, Psychological Horror
- Publisher: Headline (UK); Knopf (US)
- Publication date: Nov 1995 (UK); Jan 1996 (US)
- Publication place: United States
- Media type: Print
- Pages: 343
- ISBN: 0-7472-1334-8
- OCLC: 45340457

Intensity is a 1995 horror novel by American author Dean Koontz. The plot follows college student Chyna Shepherd who is forced to fight for her life when targeted by serial killer Edgler Vess, with chapters alternating between each character's perspective.

According to Koontz, he wrote the novel with the intention of subverting the commonly-held idea that thrillers must have periods of slow pacing between moments of excitement, instead opting to keep the tension high throughout the novel and moving from conflict to conflict without periods of released tension.

== Plot summary ==
Chyna Shepherd is a college student visiting the family of her friend, Laura Templeton, for a long weekend. Chyna, who was abused and neglected by her mother as a child, finds that the Templeton house provides something she has yearned for: acceptance. This comes to a violent end when serial killer Edgler Vess breaks into the house in the night and methodically kills all of the occupants except Laura and Chyna. After discovering that Laura has been tied up and raped, Chyna leaves, promising to return. Chyna hears Laura screaming and runs upstairs, intending to attack Vess with a knife. Before she can intervene, Vess kills Laura and takes her to his motor home. Unaware Laura is dead, Chyna sneaks aboard the motor home and finds her friend's corpse. Before she can escape, Vess drives away.

Chyna hides in a back room, planning to escape at the earliest opportunity. When Vess stops at a gas station, she sneaks out of the motor home and looks for a payphone. Chyna secretly watches Vess boast to the gas station clerks that he is holding a young girl, Ariel, prisoner in his basement, before he kills them and drives away. She feels compelled to follow Vess and help free Ariel, taking a clerk's car. Chyna passes Vess while traveling through a state park and intentionally crashes her car into a redwood tree. While Vess gets out to investigate, Chyna sneaks on board the motor home. However, unbeknownst to Chyna, Vess glimpses her. Fascinated, he decides not to kill her immediately, wanting to see what she will do. Eventually, they arrive at Vess's remote house.

Vess watches as Chyna leaves the motor home. She enters the house to find a catatonic Ariel locked in a room in the basement. Before she can free Ariel, Vess attacks Chyna in the kitchen, punching her unconscious before binding her with a chain. He taunts her for a while, revealing details about his past crimes. Obsessed with the "intensity" of any particular experience, sensory and existential, Vess styles himself as a "homicidal adventurer" and has killed continually since childhood. He offers to allow Chyna to live if she aids him in tormenting Ariel out of her catatonia. After Vess leaves for work, Chyna manages to break away from the table to which she is chained and slam her chair into a wall. She releases Ariel from her prison.

Vess has trained a pack of deadly Dobermann Pinschers to guard his property and kill anyone attempting to get in or out. Dressed in Vess's dog-training clothing, Chyna sprays ammonia on the dogs and makes it to the motor home with Ariel. Soon after, Chyna sees a police car on the road and pulls over to signal it, only to discover that the driver is Vess, the local sheriff. In the ensuing showdown, Chyna rams his police car, but he rolls clear and uses a shotgun to disable the motor home, causing it to tip over. Chyna and Ariel escape the wreck, but Vess catches up to them and knocks Chyna to the ground while Ariel continues on, distracting Vess long enough for Chyna to pull a lighter from her pocket. She uses it to ignite Vess's gasoline-soaked boot. She rolls away to safety just before the pool of gas surrounding Vess ignites. After catching up to Ariel, she turns and watches as Vess burns to death. A passing motorist stops to help them. Some months later, Chyna adopts Ariel and meets a nice man.

== Characters ==
Chyna Shepherd
Chyna is a 26-year-old graduate student still coming to terms with her abusive past, who risks her life to save a young girl from a killer. She is trained to use guns and is inventive.

Edgler Foreman Vess
Edgler is a brutal serial killer who preys on men, women and children, according to his mood. He kills for the sheer "intensity" of it; he believes that life is all about accruing sensation, and that he must live with intensity in order to discover new sensations. He meets his match in Chyna, who repeatedly surprises him through the novel, and he even admits that she frightens him as he was not able to sense her twice in the novel.

Vess tortured and killed animals as a child and committed his first murders at the age of nine when he burned his parents to death after they caught him torturing their neighbor's cat; their death was considered an accident. Two years later he stabbed his grandmother to death because she didn't clean the bathroom to his satisfaction; he was judged in need of therapy, and was later adopted. He killed his adoptive parents when he was 20—once again by fire—for the insurance money and started his killing spree six years before the novel begins. By this time, he had kidnapped and killed six women and has been holding a teenage girl for a year after killing her parents and brother. In the novel he kills eight people, making his body count at least 22.

Koontz's creation of Vess was inspired by Edmund Kemper, who, as Koontz stated in an interview: "killed his grandparents when he was [15], and was released at 21 when psychiatrists said he was no longer a threat to society. He went on to kill nine more people."

Ariel DeLane
Ariel is a kidnapped teenager who withdraws into catatonia. She has been held captive by Vess for months. Vess regards Ariel as a challenge because she has taken the longest to crack of all his captives. Vess longs to see her final breakdown but Chyna is able to rescue her. After the final confrontation with Vess on the highway, she's adopted by Chyna.

Laura Templeton
Laura is Chyna's best friend, who is killed by Vess.

== Film, TV or theatrical adaptations ==
Intensity was made into a two-part TV movie in 1997 that first aired in America on the Fox Network. It starred Molly Parker, John C. McGinley, and Tori Paul.

Several viewers of the film noticed striking similarities between the plot of the 2003 French film High Tension and the plot of Intensity. When questioned at the Sundance Festival in 2004, the director Alexandre Aja acknowledged that he had read the novel and was aware of the similarities. On his website, Koontz stated that he was aware of the comparison but would not sue "because he found the film so puerile, so disgusting, and so intellectually bankrupt that he didn’t want the association with it that would inevitably come if he pursued an action against the filmmaker."
