= Blackbird (2007 film) =

- Directed by: Adam Rapp
- Screenplay by: Adam Rapp
- Based on: Blackbird; 2004 play by Adam Rapp
- Produced by: Mark Fallon
- Starring: Gillian Jacobs; Paul Sparks; Danny Hoch
- Cinematography: Richard Rutkowski
- Edited by: Michael Taylor
- Music by: Dawn Landes
- Production company: Blackbird Project
- Release date: March 12, 2007 (SXSW)
- Running time: 104 minutes
- Country: United States
- Language: English
- Budget: $475,000

Blackbird is a 2007 American drama film written and directed by Adam Rapp and starring Gillian Jacobs, Paul Sparks, and Danny Hoch. It was adapted from a play written by Rapp.

It debuted at South by Southwest and went on to screen at the Edinburgh Film Festival and the Charlotte Film Festival, where it won "Best Narrative Feature".

== Plot ==
In 1990s New York City, teen runaway and stripper Froggy is caught in the throes of heroin addiction as she falls in love with a fellow junkie, war veteran Baylis. The couple finds comfort in each other, yet they are already far too deep in a wild downward spiral. The possibility of redemption arises, with hope for some semblance of a "normal life", but Bayliss and Froggy are unable to find the strength and control to clean themselves up. Their path leads inexorably toward mutual self-destruction.

== Cast ==
- Gillian Jacobs as Froggy
- Paul Sparks as Baylis
- Danny Hoch as Pinchback
- Michael Shannon as Murl
- Annie Parisse as Angie
- Stephen Adly Guirgis as Mercado
- Anthony Katagas as Close
- Danny Mastrogiorgio as Kent

== Critical reception ==
Screen Daily said the "film treads a well-worn path", but the "superb performances of Jacobs and Sparks keep the viewer going for a long while."
