= Anthony Katagas =

American film producer (born 1971)

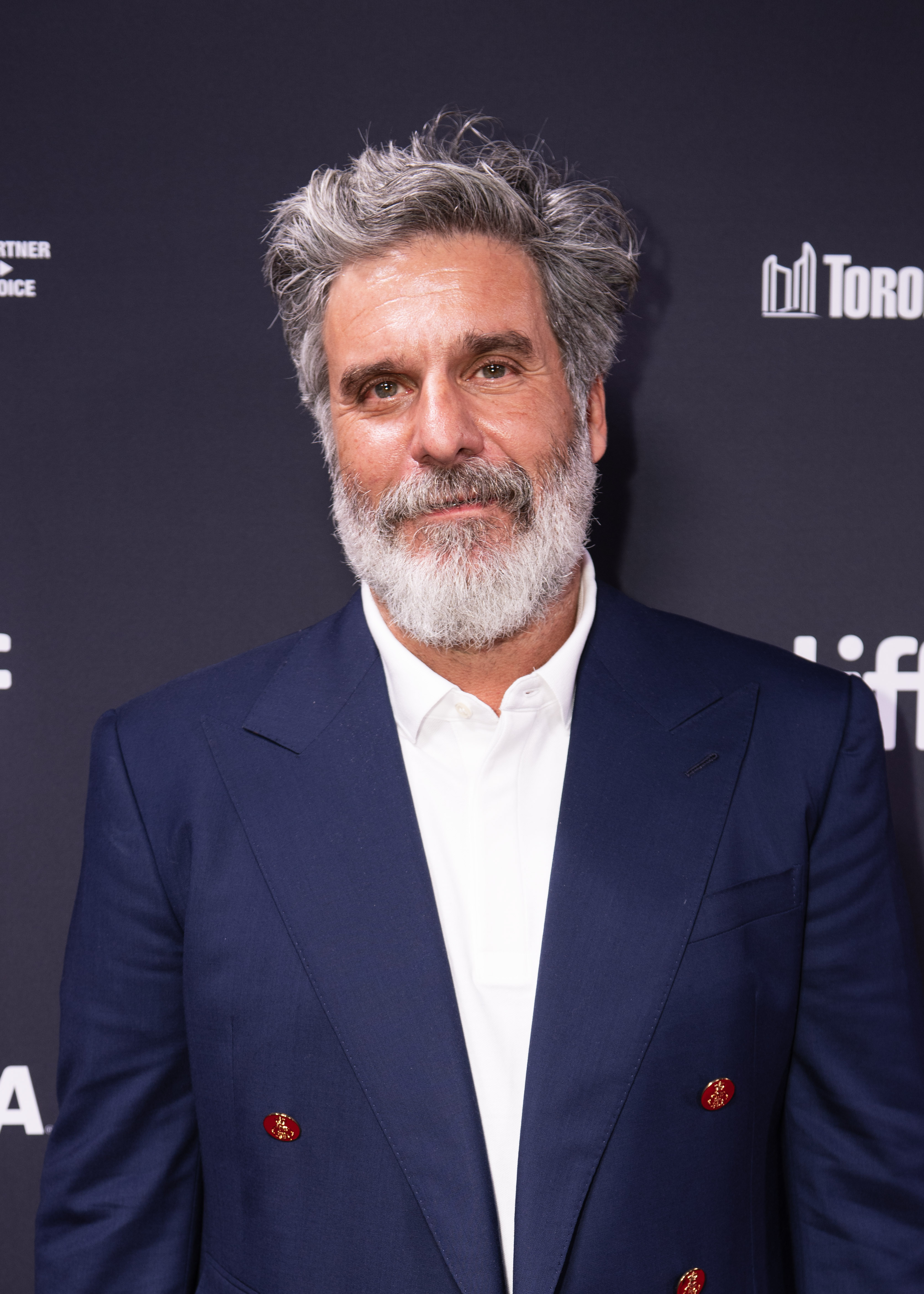
- Katagas at the 2025 Toronto International Film Festival
- Born: January 28, 1971 (age 55); New York, U.S.

Anthony Katagas (born January 28, 1971) is an American film producer. He is an alumnus of Western New England University in Springfield, Massachusetts, where he majored in government and was captain of the lacrosse team as a goalie. Of Greek heritage, he also represented Greece at the 2018 World Lacrosse Championship.

Katagas won an Academy Award for Best Picture for his role in producing 12 Years a Slave. Katagas' awards include a BAFTA, Golden Globe, Broadcast Critics' Choice Award, Independent Spirit Award, and the Darryl F. Zanuck PGA Award for Best Picture. He has had four films nominated for the Palme d'Or and two films nominated for César Awards. His films have garnered nominations or awards from the DGA, SAG, National Board of Review, Gotham Awards, New York Film Critics, Los Angeles Film Critics, and appeared on the prestigious AFI list for achievement in film.

In 1999, Katagas started Keep Your Head Productions, geared towards producing independent films in his hometown of New York City. Through Keep Your Head Productions, he has produced films by Michael Almereyda: Happy Here and Now (IFC Films, 2001), This So-Called Disaster (IFC Films, 2002), William Eggelston in the Real World (Palm Pictures, 2005) and Cymbeline (Benaroya Pictures, 2014). He also produced James Gray's The Immigrant (The Weinstein Company, 2013), which competed for the Palme d'Or at the 2013 Cannes Film Festival, and James Gray's The Lost City Of Z.

== Filmography ==
He was a producer in all films unless otherwise noted.

=== Film ===
Year	Film	Credit	Notes
2000	In the Weeds	Co-producer	
2001	3 A.M.	Co-producer	
2001	The Next Big Thing	Co-producer	
2002	Happy Here and Now		
2004	Second Best		
2004	Chrystal	Co-producer	
2004	Homework		
2005	Winter Passing	Co-producer	
2005	Prime	Co-producer	
2006	The Hoax	Executive producer	
2006	The Ex	Line producer	
2007	Blackbird		
2007	We Own the Night	Executive producer	
2007	The Life Before Her Eyes		
2008	The Accidental Husband	Executive producer	
2008	College Road Trip	Executive producer	
2008	Two Lovers		
2009	Did You Hear About the Morgans?	Executive producer	
2010	My Soul to Take	Line producer	Uncredited
2010	The Next Three Days	Executive producer	
2011	Abduction	Executive producer	
2012	Killing Them Softly		
2013	The Big Wedding		
2013	The Immigrant		
2013	12 Years a Slave		
2014	Cymbeline		
2015	True Story		
2015	Unfinished Business		
2016	Triple 9		
2016	Nerve		
2016	The Lost City of Z		
2017	Mark Felt: The Man Who Brought Down the White House		
2019	Ad Astra		
2019	Uncut Gems	Executive producer	
2020	Worth		
2020	The Trial of the Chicago 7	Executive producer	
2021	The Woman in the Window		
2022	Deep Water		
2022	Armageddon Time		
2022	Amsterdam		
2025	Good Fortune		
2025	Marty Supreme		
2026	Paper Tiger		
TBA	The Bookie & the Bruiser		

Production manager

Year	Film	Role
1999	Spy Games	Production manager: New York
2000	Down to You	Production manager: Additional photography
2000	Hamlet	Production manager
2000	Stardom	Production manager: New York
2001	3 A.M.	Production manager
2001	The Next Big Thing	Production manager
2002	Nearest to Heaven	Production manager: New York
2003	Lost in Translation	Production supervisor
2004	The Beautiful Country	Production manager: New York
2005	Prime	Unit production manager
2006	The Hoax	Unit production manager
2007	We Own the Night	Unit production manager
2007	The Life Before Her Eyes	Unit production manager
2008	The Accidental Husband	Unit production manager
2008	College Road Trip	Unit production manager
2008	Two Lovers	Unit production manager
2009	Did You Hear About the Morgans?	Unit production manager
2010	My Soul to Take	Unit production manager
2010	The Next Three Days	Unit production manager
2011	Abduction	Unit production manager
2012	Killing Them Softly	Unit production manager
2013	The Immigrant	Unit production manager
2013	12 Years a Slave	Unit production manager
2016	Triple 9	Unit production manager
2016	The Lost City of Z	Unit production manager
2019	Ad Astra	Unit production manager
2022	Deep Water	Unit production manager
2022	Amsterdam	Unit production manager

Second unit director or assistant director

Year	Film	Role	Notes
1998	54	Assistant director	Uncredited
1998	Long Time Since	Second second assistant director	
1998	The Eternal	Assistant director: Additional photography	
1998	The Farmhouse	Assistant director	
1999	Stringer	Second assistant director	
1999	Hostage	First assistant director	

As an actor

Year	Film	Role
1998	Long Time Since	Younger Man
2001	The Next Big Thing	Gallery Guy 1
2007	Blackbird	Close

Stunts

Year	Film	Role
1998	Long Time Since	Stunt double

Thanks

Year	Film	Role
2011	Margin Call	The production wishes to thank
2012	For a Good Time, Call...	The producers wish to thank
2020	Project Power	The producers would like to thank

=== Television ===
Year	Title	Credit	Notes
2003	Rudy: The Rudy Giuliani Story	Line producer	Television film
2008	A Muppets Christmas: Letters to Santa		Television special

Production manager

Year	Title	Role	Notes
2008	A Muppets Christmas: Letters to Santa	Unit production manager	Television special

Thanks

Year	Title	Role	Notes
2014	John Leguizamo's Ghetto Klown	Very special thanks	Television special
