= Intensity (film) =

- Promotional artwork by Peter Ambush, for the Newark Star-Ledger's Scanner magazine
- Based on: Intensity by Dean Koontz
- Written by: Stephen Tolkin
- Directed by: Yves Simoneau
- Starring: John C. McGinley; Molly Parker; Deanna Milligan; Piper Laurie
- Music by: George S. Clinton
- Country of origin: United States
- Original language: English

Production
- Producers: Preston Fischer; Dean R. Koontz; Tom Patricia; Deborah Edell Underwood
- Cinematography: David Franco
- Editor: Michael Ornstein
- Running time: 186 minutes
- Production companies: Mandalay Entertainment; TriStar Television

Original release
- Network: Fox
- Release: August 5, 1997

Intensity is a 1997 American television psychological thriller film directed by Yves Simoneau, and starring John C. McGinley, Molly Parker, Piper Laurie, and Tori Paul. Based on the 1995 novel of the same name by Dean Koontz, it focuses on a young woman who accompanies her friend home for Thanksgiving, only to be met by a violent serial killer.

The film originally was released as a two-part miniseries on Fox on August 5, 1997, with part two airing the following day.

== Plot ==
Chyna Shepherd accompanies her friend, Laura Templeton, to her family's house in rural Washington State for Thanksgiving dinner. A serial killer named Edgler Vess invades the house and kills Laura and her family as Chyna hides in the killer's RV. When Vess stops at a gas station, Chyna escapes and asks the two attendants to call the police. Before she has time to explain, Vess returns and torments the two workers before brutally killing them with a shotgun. Chyna then learns that he is holding a 14-year-old girl named Ariel hostage in his basement. She becomes determined to save Ariel and uses one of the shopkeepers' cars to follow Vess back to his home. On the road she runs into a woman named Miriam and asks her to call the police. Miriam believes Chyna is disturbed and moves on.

Miriam stops at the gas station and finds the shopkeepers' bodies, leading her to believe Chyna's story. She makes a hysterical phone call to the police, telling them that they "need to save Chyna and Ariel," which the police initially dismiss. Upon trying to fall back to sleep, a policeman, Ethan Trevaine, remembers the name Ariel from a missing person's case and begins investigating. Meanwhile, Chyna's car runs out of gasoline and she abandons it in the middle of the road, forcing Vess to stop. As he pushes the car down an embankment, Chyna enters his RV and hides, unknowingly leaving footprints. Vess suspects another person has entered the RV but feigns obliviousness. He then kills Miriam when she tries to run him off the road and save Chyna. When they arrive at his home, Chyna attempts to free Ariel from a fortified room. She is attacked and subdued by Vess.

As a captive, Chyna speaks with Vess and has flashbacks to her traumatic childhood: as a little girl, she witnessed her disturbed, abusive mother and her boyfriend kill her neighbors. In turn, Vess reveals his obsession with the "intensity" of any particular experience and declares his intention to kill both her and Ariel, offering Chyna a slightly more merciful death if she agrees to aid him in mentally torturing Ariel out of her catatonia. The two have further existential conversations regarding God and the nature of good and evil.

When Vess is late returning to work after the Thanksgiving holiday, he makes up an excuse to his boss and departs, leaving Chyna chained to the dining room table. She watches in horror as one of Vess's other captives escapes from a drain hatch in his backyard, only to be mauled to death by his bloodthirsty German Shepherds. Chyna manages to free herself and seizes the opportunity to escape with Ariel. After dressing in Vess's dog-training gear and spraying ammonia in the eyes of his dogs, Chyna attempts to flee with Ariel in Vess's RV, but unwittingly triggers an alarm that causes him to return home early.

Before they can make their escape, an unmarked vehicle and a police car arrive. Although Chyna believes Vess to be in the unmarked vehicle driven by Trevaine, it is revealed that Vess is actually a sheriff who emerges from the police car and opens fire on Trevaine, killing him. Chyna and Ariel manage to escape back to Vess's house, where Chyna ultimately gets the better of Vess. She sets him on fire, confines him in Ariel's old room and watches as he burns to death. In the aftermath, Chyna visits Ariel in a psychiatric hospital but is denied custody of her; she is told that the young girl will require extensive therapy to recover from her trauma. As Chyna prepares to leave without her, Ariel, speaking for the first time, suddenly calls out to her the name "Badger", a character from a story Chyna had told her about to help bring her courage while escaping from Vess. The two embrace, and it is implied that Chyna's custody of Ariel was granted.

== Cast ==
- John C. McGinley as Edgler Foreman Vess
- Molly Parker as Chyna Shepherd
  - Katie Stuart as Young Chyna
- Blu Mankuma as Ethan Trevaine
- Lori Triolo as Lori
- Brent Stait as Jim Woltz
- Deanna Milligan as Laura Templeton
- Kavan Smith as Jack Templeton
- Piper Laurie as Miriam Braynard
- Tori Paul as Ariel Delane
- Alex Diakun as Mr. John Q. Citizen
- Babz Chula as Mrs. John Q. Citizen
- Alf Humphreys as George Jespersen
- Edmond Kato Wong as Tom
- Meredith Bain Woodward as Sarah Templeton

== Production ==
The miniseries was filmed in Vancouver, British Columbia, Canada.

== Release ==
Intensity aired in two parts on Fox network on August 5 and August 6, 1997, respectively. The film was the first summer-released miniseries or television film produced by Fox at the time.

=== Critical response ===
Ron Miller of Knight Ridder News praised the film as a "horror masterpiece, intelligently conceived and brilliantly executed, and the best program of its time television has ever produced." Tom Shales of The Washington Post panned the film for its graphic subject matter, writing: "Intensity is certainly not without its shocks and scares. But the whole thing is so stomach-churning and nasty that you don't so much watch it as subject yourself to it. Life is really much too short to spend four hours of it with a preening, prancing monster like Edgler Vess."

Hal Boedeker of The Baltimore Sun criticized the film for its plot holes and cliched elements, writing: "So it pushes the boundaries for made-for-TV thrillers. Do we need to start a national furor over it? Nope. Don't watch. A more crucial rating for Intensity would be a big fat I (for illogical)."

In a 2021 retrospective assessment of the film for Screen Rant, critic Cathal Gunning wrote that Intensity is the best adaptation of a Dean Koontz novel to date.

=== Home media ===
In 2012, Sony Pictures Home Entertainment released Intensity on DVD-R through their "Choice Collection" of made-on-demand discs.
