= The Copper Elephant =

1999 novel by Adam Rapp

- First edition
- Author: Adam Rapp
- Cover artist: Helen Robinson
- Language: English
- Genre: Young adult novel
- Published: 1999
- Publisher: Boyd Mills Press
- Publication place: United States
- Media type: Print
- Pages: 228
- ISBN: 0-06-447261-2

The Copper Elephant is a young adult science fiction novel by Adam Rapp. It was published 2 November 1999 by Front Street, an imprint of Boyds Mills Press.

The story is told from the perspective of an eleven-year-old girl, Whensday Bluehouse. She lives in a future ruled by a fascist regime that employs child slave labor. She is on the verge of starvation throughout most of the book, and the future is bleak.

Library of Congress CPD Summary: "In a world where children under twelve are used as slave labor in subterranean lime mines, eleven-year-old Whensday Bluehouse struggles to survive the continuous poison rains and evade the ruthless Syndicate soldiers."

== Background ==
Adam Rapp stated in an interview that the book was based on his dissatisfaction with capitalism and America's "obsession with commerce" and the negative effects of the industrial revolution. It inspired by him seeing "American Embassy soldiers torturing a child in South Africa, which made him interested in writing about how kids were treated.

== Character List ==
- Whensday Bluehouse – narrator, she struggles to survive on The Shelf, in the bleak world of the Syndicate.
- Tick Burrowman – rescued Whensday from The Pits. He makes coffins that are used by the Syndicate. He has made a deal with a woman from Toptown to sell Whensday to her, to be raised as her own.
- Second Staff Brown – Syndicate man in charge of supply, he later rapes Whensday, and is killed for it.
- Inch Bluestroke – a man who lost his wife and was found trying to attempt suicide, Tick Burrowman rescues him and nurses him back to health, only to discover that he later succeeds in taking his own life.
- Joe Painter – young syndicate man in charge of supplying Tick with wood for his "body boxes", he is revolted by the child labor conditions in The Pits and leaves the Syndicate. He later attempts to escape to Toptown with Whensday via a boat on the Red River.
- Honeycut Greenhouse – Similar to Steinbeck's "Lenny", Honeycut befriends Whensday and they live together for a short period. He builds an aluminum foil elephant and places it high in a tree. Because of the acid rain, it turns a copper color, hence the name of the book.
- Oakley Brownhouse – a lost boy who has escaped from The Pits in the coffin of another child. He befriends Whensday and Honeycut. Whensday falls in love with him.

== Plot ==
Whensday Bluehouse is an orphan who was rescued from a life working in the Pits by coffin maker Tick Burrowman. Burrowman is attempting to make a profit by selling Whensday to a woman from Toptown, a part of the world that is unaffected by acid rain and life on The Shelf. Whensday is unsure of the security of this exchange, and sneaks away one night. Burrowman may have actually grown fond of Whensday, and it is unclear if he is interested in giving her away after all.

While Whensday is on the run, she stumbles upon a large, mentally handicapped teenager named Honeycut Greenhouse, obviously another orphan. He was separated from his brother, much as Whensday was, and it is obvious that Honeycut doesn't have the faculties to take care of himself. Whensday decides to befriend Honeycut, and he rescues her during a vicious rape by Second Staff Brown, a minor officer in the military. Honeycut kills Brown, and a manhunt begins, ending with Honeycut's capture.

Whensday flees and hides in the only place she knows, Tick Burrowman's home. Upon her arrival, she finds him dead, and a former friend, Joe Painter, seriously ill. They cobble together a flotilla of "body boxes" and attempt to paddle up the river, away from the Shelf and the head for Toptown. But Joe Painter dies on the trip, and the current carries Whensday back to the shelf. She is rescued by a secret clan of women, hiding from the Syndicate, and she stays with them.
