= 33 Snowfish =

2003 novel by Adam Rapp

33 snowfish
- Author: Adam Rapp
- Cover artist: Timothy Basil Ering
- Language: English
- Publisher: Candlewick Press
- Publication date: March 1, 2003
- Publication place: United States
- Media type: Hardback and paperback
- Pages: 192 pp (first edition, hardback); 179 pp (Paperback)
- ISBN: 978-0-7636-1874-2 (first edition, hardback); ISBN 978-0-7636-2917-5 (Paperback)
- OCLC: 50477270
- LC Class: PZ7.R1765 Aae 2003

33 Snowfish is a 2003 novel by Adam Rapp. The American Library Association made the book one of their 2004 book picks.

== Plot ==
33 Snowfish follows the character of Custis, a 10-year-old orphan living with his "owner" Bob Motley, who sexually abuses him, in a dilapidated house in Rockdale, Illinois. After overhearing that he was to star in a snuff movie, Custis steals a small pistol and escapes through a hole in the wall. While hiding from Motley's crew and begging for quarters in a video arcade at the Joliet Mall, Custis spots Boobie (whose real name is Darrin Flowers), a strange boy with black eyes and a single painted fingernail. Custis decides to follow Boobie into Crazy Lou's Woods, a private woodland supposedly owned by an ex-military cat farmer. Custis and Boobie soon become friends.

Custis, having no home, and Boobie, who has an unstable relationship with his parents, set up a makeshift home in the woods with a tent and steal electricity from a nearby paper factory. Soon they are joined by Curl, Boobie's 14-year-old girlfriend who is addicted to drugs and supports herself as a prostitute, and finally, Boobie's baby brother, whom Boobie abducts after murdering his parents. The four of them take to the road in a stolen Buick Skylark to flee the police who are searching for Boobie, engaging in dumpster diving, robbery, and begging in various Chicago suburbs along the way.

== Characters ==
- Custis – A 10-year-old homeless boy who escaped from a child pornography operation. Custis carries a loaded handgun (a "gat") with three bullets and a broken trigger. He suffers from a seizure-like condition that he refers to as "migration (sic) headaches" which cause him to black out and wake up in different locations. He has frequent dreams about a mysterious individual called Big Tiny, who was said to have been his mother.
- Curl – A 14-year-old girl from Bolingbrook, Illinois, who used to live with her disabled aunt Frisco who forced her to turn tricks in their apartment. Curl is kind-hearted, acting as an older sister to Custis, as well as extremely superstitious, believing that she had met Boobie because she sat on top of a pile of Chex cereal on the first of May. She expresses a desire to settle down and marry both Custis and Boobie.
- Boobie (Darrin Flowers) – A 17-year-old boy from Joliet, Illinois who is a violent pyromaniac. Boobie rarely speaks, choosing to express himself via his drawings. He is possessive of Curl and extremely protective of Custis, with whom he shares a special friendship. Boobie eventually murders his parents and abducts his infant brother, and goes on the run from the police in a stolen Buick Skylark.
- Boobie's brother – An unnamed infant who sleeps in a gutted Magnavox TV in the back of Boobie's car. He has blue eyes and an odd seam down his forehead, for which he is thought to be unintelligent or defective by the others. He is regarded as a likely source of income if he can be sold.

== Reception ==
Critical reception for 33 Snowfish has been positive, with the book garnering praise from the School Library Journal and Kirkus Reviews. Publishers Weekly commented on the book's language and content, stating "Readers may have trouble stomaching the language..., as well as the horrors so flatly depicted and, in the end, so handily overcome." A reviewer for Kliatt also mentioned the book's mature themes, saying the book was "Not for every taste, but the grittiness and realistic dialogue here may help this bleak though ultimately uplifting novel find a readership."

The English Journal commented on the book's mature themes, citing it as one of several books that would help challenge teen readers.

33 Snowfish has been criticized by conservative activists, along with other young adult fiction titles, for potentially exposing children to excessively violent and sexual themes. In 2021, the school board of Spotsylvania County, Virginia voted to remove it from school libraries along with other "objectionable" content, with two school board members expressing support for burning the books in question. The decision was later reversed.

In an article with Horn Book Magazine, Candlewick Press's editorial director commented that Rapp's original version of 33 Snowfish contained stronger language which had to be edited down before it could be sold.
