= Henry & Me =

- DVD cover
- Directed by: Barrett Esposito
- Written by: David I. Stern
- Based on: One Last Time: Goodbye to Yankee Stadium by Ray Negron
- Produced by: Joseph Avallone; Joe Castellano
- Starring: Richard Gere; Chazz Palminteri; Danny Aiello; Cyndi Lauper; Paul Simon; Austin Williams; Lucie Arnaz; Hank Steinbrenner
- Edited by: Joe Castellano
- Music by: Charles David Denler
- Production company: Reveal Animation Studios
- Distributed by: Henry & Me Productions
- Release dates: August 18, 2014 (New York City); September 30, 2014 (DVD)
- Running time: 67 minutes
- Country: United States
- Language: English

Henry & Me is a 2014 American animated drama film directed by Barrett Esposito and written by David I. Stern. The film is based on Ray Negron's children's book One Last Time: Goodbye to Yankee Stadium, and stars Richard Gere, Chazz Palminteri, Danny Aiello, Cyndi Lauper, Paul Simon, Austin Williams, Lucie Arnaz and Hank Steinbrenner. The film was released on DVD on September 30, 2014.

In the film, a young cancer patient is having surgery in the hospital, while dreaming of his favorite baseball team, the New York Yankees. His guardian angel takes him into a journey into the team's past, while subtly convincing him to keep struggling to survive. The angel is revealed to be an incarnation of Lou Gehrig.

== Plot ==
Jack McCarthy, an 11-year-old boy from upstate New York, enjoys a comfortable life centered on his family's devotion to the New York Yankees. He and his parents frequently attend games, sharing a deep enthusiasm for the team. One evening, while handling a baseball with his father before dinner, Jack experiences a sudden episode of anemia and drops the ball. His parents, alarmed by the incident, immediately recognize it as a sign of serious illness. Jack is hospitalized and diagnosed with advanced cancer. Now bald from treatment, he is being prepared for surgery. As he is wheeled toward the operating room, his parents remain behind. A nurse named Cyndi attempts to cheer him by singing "Take Me Out to the Ball Game", but the effort fails to lift his mood. She administers a sedative to ease him into the procedure, leaving him momentarily alone outside the operating room. Facing the gravity of his condition, Jack reflects on what may be the final moments of his life. At that point, he is greeted by a man presenting himself as Henry, a Yankees executive. Henry offers to distract Jack by watching a game while he waits. Hesitant at first, Jack accepts, and Henry transports him to an imagined, timeless realm where the 20th century persists without illness, past Yankee players remain alive and healthy, and Jack's hair has returned.

Their first destination is a rural field in the early 1930s, where they encounter Babe Ruth. Ruth persuades the nervous Jack to take a turn at bat. After striking out three times, following an anxious claim of a peanut allergy, Jack receives encouragement from Ruth to persist. Though his teammates initially mock his youth, Jack succeeds in stealing home. He and Henry then depart in a 1935 Cord 810 convertible, driving upward into the sky. The next stop is the mid-1960s, where the original Yankee Stadium stands alongside the newer facility. In the locker room, Jack meets Lefty Gomez, Mickey Mantle, Bobby Murcer, and Thurman Munson. Once again placed in a game situation, Jack is assigned to pitch. During the ensuing match, Munson urges him to throw to Mantle, but Jack resists due to inexperience. Their conversation remains positive until Jack feels his blood pressure drop, prompting a sudden awareness that the real contest is his struggle for survival in the physical world. Jack undergoes a life review alongside other children. When he asks Cissy, a girl he encountered earlier on a subway train in this realm, whether she misses her parents, she confirms that she does every day, suggesting she is a departed soul. Cissy and several other baseball-playing children bid Jack farewell. With renewed determination, Jack prevails in both the symbolic game and his battle against his illness.

Transported to the present day within this realm, Jack encounters an elderly George Steinbrenner, who invites him to join the Yankees. Supported by Yogi Berra, Reggie Jackson, and Goose Gossage, Jack is outfitted in a Yankees uniform. He takes the field alongside Curtis Granderson and Hideki Matsui in a contest against the Boston Red Sox. After the opposing pitcher tips a pitch, leading to an unusual play, Jack quietly recalls Babe Ruth's words to Matsui. Later, Jack bats powerfully, sending the ball into Monument Park. As night falls, Jack expresses a desire to meet Joe DiMaggio, Roger Maris, and Billy Martin, but Henry advises postponing the encounters. With a rainstorm approaching, symbolizing the boundary between realms, Jack resists returning to his former life, preferring the health and vitality of this world. He briefly flees, leaving his cap behind. Henry finds him and discloses his true identity as Lou Gehrig, a player who endured his own devastating illness. Gehrig urges Jack to continue fighting for his life in the real world. Accepting the counsel, Jack bids farewell to Gehrig, Lefty Gomez, and Babe Ruth before departing.

Jack awakens in the hospital to his parents' relief. The Yankees organization visits, and Steinbrenner presents him with a Yankees pin, declaring him an honorary member of the team. Jack expresses confidence that his hair will regrow. A post-credits scene shows Henry and Ruth picking up Steinbrenner in the Cord convertible.

== Cast ==
- Austin Williams as Jack
- Richard Gere as Henry / Lou Gehrig
- Chazz Palminteri as Babe Ruth
- Danny Aiello as Dr. Acosta
- Cyndi Lauper as Nurse Cyndi
- Paul Simon as Thurman Munson
- Lucie Arnaz as Jack's Mom
- Joseph Gian as Jack's Dad
- Hank Steinbrenner as George Steinbrenner
- Luis Guzmán as Vernon "Lefty" Gomez
- Reggie Jackson as himself
- Nick Swisher as himself
- Yogi Berra as himself
- Hideki Matsui as himself
- Michael Kay as himself
- Joe Girardi as himself
- Mariano Rivera as himself
- Bernie Williams as himself
- Jorge Posada as himself
- David Mantle as Mickey Mantle
- Mark Teixeira as himself
- John Sterling as himself
- Bob Sheppard as Stadium Announcer
- CC Sabathia as himself
- Linda Tosetti as Nurse
- Serena Girardi as Little Girl On Train
- Scott Clark as Bobby Murcer
- Curtis Granderson as himself
- Goose Gossage as himself
- Nancy Newman as Nurse
- Mickey Rivers as himself
- Emily Lashendock as Baseball Fan
- Kevin Long as himself

== Production ==
Henry & Me is based on Ray Negron's children's book One Last Time: Goodbye to Yankee Stadium. The film began production in 2009, when the voice acting was recorded. The screenplay was written by David I. Stern. Actors Richard Gere, Cyndi Lauper, Lucie Arnaz, Joseph Gian, and José Feliciano (who originally played Jack's doctor) performed for free upon learning the film's subject matter and of the production's charity efforts. In January 2010, Yankee Stadium announcer Bob Sheppard recorded his dialogue for the film, six months before his death in July 2010. In February 2010, Hank Steinbrenner recorded his dialogue in the role of his father George Steinbrenner. In September 2014, Hank Steinbrenner told The Hollywood Reporter: "When my dad got sick, my dad actually asked me to do the voice, and that was really the whole start of it. I know that people look at my father as an iconic figure, but I was looking at him more as my father. It was something that I knew I could do, and I was actually really excited to do it. I knew that no one else could bring out the gist of my dad and no one knew him like me. And I always considered myself a pretty good actor in my own right." In August 2010, CC Sabathia and Yogi Berra recorded their dialogue for the film.

In 2013, after the Biogenesis baseball scandal, Alex Rodriguez' scenes were cut from the film. The film's producer Joseph Avallone explained: "Its message of hope in the face of insurmountable odds—as told through the fantastical story of a young boy who goes on a magical journey with the New York Yankees—features, among A-list Hollywood talent, a collection of real-life Yankees, past and present, lending their voices and their spirits to this heartwarming tale. In 2009, Alex Rodriguez accepted an offer to participate in the film, in part, as a way to rehabilitate his image after his first bout with controversy surrounding performance enhancing drugs. When it became clear in summer 2013 that Rodriguez’s commitment to that rehabilitation was not entirely genuine, the film’s producers made the costly and time-consuming, but absolutely essential, decision to remove his voice performance from the final cut in an effort to preserve all of the goodwill that went into making this film—including the work of our charity partners. Henry & Me is family entertainment first and foremost, and we look forward to children, their parents, and sports fans across the country and around the world discovering the film when it premieres on DVD and digital download this fall." He was replaced with Hideki Matsui.

== Release ==
Henry & Me was originally set to be released in March 2010 in Tampa before appearing at the Tribeca Festival. Although Negron hoped for the film's DVD release to coincide with the World Series, production was delayed by 14 months to redo major scenes in response to George Steinbrenner's death. The film premiered at the Ziegfeld Theatre in New York City on August 18, 2014. It was released on DVD on September 30, 2014.

== Reception ==
On review aggregator Rotten Tomatoes, the film holds an approval rating of 80% based on 5 reviews, with an average rating of 6/10.

== See also ==
- List of films about angels
- List of baseball films
