= Austin Williams (actor) =

American soap opera actor (born 1996)

- Born: November 13, 1996 (age 29); New York City, New York, U.S.
- Occupation: Actor
- Years active: 2005–2015

Austin Williams (born November 13, 1996 in New York City, New York) is an American soap opera actor. In 2005, Austin was cast in the film The Good Shepherd, which starred Matt Damon, as the young version of Damon's character Edward Wilson. In October 2007, he was cast in the role of Shane Morasco on One Life to Live, a role that continued until January 2012. In 2008, he was nominated for a Young Artist Award for "Best Performance in a Feature Film - Young Actor Age Ten or Younger" for his role as Henry Clayton in the 2007 film Michael Clayton.

In 2012, at the 33rd Young Artist Awards, Austin was nominated for his performance in A Gifted Man and won for his performance in One Life to Live.

== Filmography ==
Film
Year	Film	Role	Notes
2006	The Good Shepherd	Young Edward Wilson	
2007	The Girl Next Door	Ralphie 'Woofer' Chandler	
2007	Michael Clayton	Henry Clayton	
2008	Home Movie	Jack Poe	
2008	Phoebe in Wonderland	Tommy	
2010	Burning Palms	Nicholas Pinter	
2013	Blood Ties	Young Chris Pierzynski	
2013	Sugar	Ronnie	
2014	Henry & Me	Jack (voice)	
Television guest spots
Year	Title	Role	Episodes
2006	Sensing Murder	Kirk Neufeld	"Random Killer"
2007–12	One Life to Live	Shane Morasco	227 episodes
2008	Law & Order	Billy Bo9ne	"Angelgrove"
2009	Rescue Me	Male Student	"Play"
2011	A Gifted Man	Steven Tucker	"In Case of Exposure"

== Awards and nominations ==
Year	Award	Category	Work	Result
2008	Young Artist Award	Best Performance in a Feature Film - Young Actor Age Ten or Younger	Michael Clayton	Nominated
2009	Young Artist Award	Outstanding Young Performers in a TV Series (shared with Eddie Alderson, Kristen Alderson, Camila Banus and Carmen LoPorto)	One Life to Live	Nominated
2009	Young Artist Award	Best Performance in a TV Series - Recurring Young Actor	One Life to Live	Nominated
2010	Young Artist Award	Best Performance in a TV Series - Recurring Young Actor 13 and Under	One Life to Live	Nominated
2012	Young Artist Award	Best Performance in a Daytime TV Series - Young Actor (shared with Andrew Trischitta)	One Life to Live	Won
2012	Young Artist Award	Best Performance in a TV Series - Guest Starring Young Actor 14-17	A Gifted Man	Nominated
