= The Perfect Mark =

- Person of Interest episode
- Episode no.: Season 3 Episode 7
- Directed by: Stephen Surjik
- Written by: Sean Hennen
- Cinematography by: Manuel Billeter
- Editing by: Ryan Malanaphy
- Production code: 2J7607
- Original air date: November 5, 2013
- Running time: 44 minutes

Guest appearances
- Aaron Staton as Hayden Price; Clarke Peters as Alonzo Quinn; Brian Wiles as Officer Mike Laskey; Jennifer Ferrin as Natalie Boal; Al Sapienza as Detective Raymond Terney; Carsten Norgaard as Sven Vanger; James Joseph O'Neil as Decker; Steve Rosen as Nagel; Robert John Burke as Officer Patrick Simmons; Enrico Colantoni as Carl Elias

Episode chronology
← Previous "Mors Praematura"	Next → "Endgame"

"The Perfect Mark" is the 7th episode of the third season of the American television drama series Person of Interest. It is the 52nd overall episode of the series and is written by Sean Hennen and directed by Stephen Surjik. It aired on CBS in the United States and on CTV in Canada on November 5, 2013.

The series revolves around a computer program for the federal government known as "The Machine" that is capable of collating all sources of information to predict terrorist acts and to identify people planning them. A team, consisting of John Reese, Harold Finch and Sameen Shaw follow "irrelevant" crimes: lesser level of priority for the government. In the episode, the team goes after a hypnotherapist who uses his sessions to scam his patients through access to their accounts. Meanwhile, Carter and Laskey start getting more evidence on HR and their case starts connecting with the hypnotherapist.

According to Nielsen Media Research, the episode was seen by an estimated 11.79 million household viewers and gained a 1.9/6 ratings share among adults aged 18–49. The episode received very positive reviews, with critics praising HR's storyline and climax, although the case-of-the-week storyline received criticism.

== Plot ==
Finch (Michael Emerson) has posed as a patient for their newest number: Hayden Price (Aaron Staton), a hypnotherapist. He discovers that Price uses the therapy sessions to con his clients and gain access to their accounts. Reese (Jim Caviezel) and Shaw (Sarah Shahi) follow Price to a meeting with a client when a police officer arrives to arrest Price but both Price and the officer shoot each other while the client escapes. This is part of another scam where Price and the officer takes the client's money and splits it, with Price even scamming the officer with a higher fee.

Carter (Taraji P. Henson) meets with Alonzo Quinn (Clarke Peters), unaware of his HR association. He offers to help in Beecher's murder but Carter declines, which causes Quinn to consider that Carter may be investigating on her own. Laskey (Brian Wiles) later meets with Simmons (Robert John Burke) and Terney (Al Sapienza) and is ordered to kill Sven "The Swede" Vanger (Carsten Norgaard), a HR member that laundered money and bids on fake items at auctions. Vanger is actually one of Price's patients, connecting both cases. At an auction, Vanger bids $900,000 on a Honus Wagner baseball card, which he carelessly tosses into a cabinet. By accessing Vanger's accounts, Price became the new target of HR as he interfered with their money operations.

Price intends to leave town with his girlfriend Natalie (Jennifer Ferrin) and starts shredding evidence of his activities before his office is shot up by two HR hitmen, who are killed when Reese and Shaw arrive. Seeking answers, Carter consults Elias (Enrico Colantoni), who explains that HR used Vanger to launder money and deposit it in offshore accounts to avoid suspicion. In another auction, Vanger bids $4.4 million on a baseball signed by the 1927 New York Yankees and later sells it for $5 to a kid. Elias states that all the items that Vanger bids on are fake while HR keeps the laundered money.

Carter and Fusco (Kevin Chapman) confront Vanger in his office and find that Price got into his e-mail and made him bid on a different item, therefore the baseball was actually $4.4 million worth and he traded it away for $5. They then stage him to look like he was murdered and send a photo to Laskey, which he sends to Simmons. Price uses his own girlfriend to escape and meets with the kid, buying the baseball for $20. Quinn is angry at the auction incident and demands the baseball be returned. Reese and Fusco intercept Price before he flees with his girlfriend but they discover that HR has kidnapped Natalie, demanding the baseball at the auction house.

Simmons then gives orders to Laskey to kill Natalie even when Price delivers the baseball. Price arrives with the baseball and is taken by Terney and other HR members to the auction house. However, the baseball is a fake one and Terney is about to kill Price before being knocked unconscious by Reese and Shaw. Carter and Shaw then help Natalie escape and give Laskey a punch to provide him with an alibi. However, Natalie reveals to Price on the phone that she is a con artist and the kid worked with her, she has the real baseball. Reese and Shaw advise Price to continue hypnotherapy but in another city.

Finch has a talk with Root (Amy Acker), where she says she is concerned for him and the Machine. An injured Terney meets with Simmons, who angrily demands that he find Laskey and the baseball. Laskey shows Carter the pictures he has taken of Simmons' activities when Terney arrives. Terney kills Laskey but Carter fatally shoots Terney. She then asks him to tell her the identity of HR's boss. With his dying breath, Terney puts his bloodstained finger on a photo, pointing at Quinn.

== Reception ==
=== Viewers ===
In its original American broadcast, "The Perfect Mark" was seen by an estimated 11.79 million household viewers and gained a 1.9/6 ratings share among adults aged 18–49, according to Nielsen Media Research. This means that 1.9 percent of all households with televisions watched the episode, while 6 percent of all households watching television at that time watched it. This was a 2% decrease in viewership from the previous episode, which was watched by 12.00 million viewers with a 1.9/5 in the 18-49 demographics. With these ratings, Person of Interest was the third most watched show on CBS for the night, behind NCIS: Los Angeles and NCIS (TV series), second on its timeslot and seventh for the night in the 18-49 demographics, behind New Girl, The Biggest Loser, NCIS: Los Angeles, Agents of S.H.I.E.L.D., NCIS, and The Voice.

With Live +7 DVR factored in, the episode was watched by 16.11 million viewers with a 3.0 in the 18-49 demographics.

=== Critical reviews ===
"The Perfect Mark" received very positive reviews from critics. Matt Fowler of IGN gave the episode a "great" 8.4 out of 10 rating and wrote in his verdict, "This week's Person of Interest threw some clever tricks at us, but its strength ultimately rested in the escalating HR storyline and the big ending."

Phil Dyess-Nugent of The A.V. Club gave the episode an "A−" grade and wrote, "After last week's vigorous shoot-'em-up, 'The Perfect Mark' is a pleasingly lighthearted, low-stakes little caper of an episode. Not that nobody gets shot up. But even the big action set pieces are staged as if in rebuke to the very idea of big action set pieces, or as tributes to the power of simplicity, efficiency, and having your face in the opening credits."
