= The Good Catholic =

- Theatrical release poster
- Directed by: Paul Shoulberg
- Written by: Paul Shoulberg
- Produced by: Zachary Spicer; John Armstrong; Graham Sheldon
- Starring: Zachary Spicer; Wrenn Schmidt; Danny Glover; John C. McGinley
- Cinematography: Justin Montgomery
- Edited by: Kevin Weaver
- Music by: Zachary Walter
- Production company: Pigasus Pictures
- Distributed by: Broad Green Pictures; Gravitas Ventures
- Release dates: February 3, 2017 (SBIFF); September 8, 2017 (United States)
- Running time: 96 minutes
- Country: United States
- Language: English

The Good Catholic is a 2017 American romantic comedy film written and directed by Paul Shoulberg. The film stars Zachary Spicer, Wrenn Schmidt, Danny Glover and John C. McGinley. The film was released on September 8, 2017, by Broad Green Pictures.

== Plot ==
Three Catholic priests live in a rectory together. Young Father Daniel jogs daily and lost his father in the past year. Father Ollie really likes food and is a big fan of Indiana University basketball. More elderly Father Victor is completely devoted to the Church, with little outside interests. He finds comfort in setting up the candles and the church for mass, by himself in his own specific way. They eat together, set the weekly schedule for baptisms and church services and run the general work of the church. They also discuss Scripture, their proposed homilies and the meaning of God in their lives.

One Friday night, young Father Dan meets Jane through the confessional box. She tells him she is a musician and is dying. She is unfamiliar with Catholicism, but over the weeks they become friends, to the point of playing "battleship" in the confessional. Jane explains how she wants her remains to be disposed of, but changes her mind at times. She invites Dan to hear her sing at her coffeehouse and he goes. One night, they reverse roles and she wants him to unburden himself. He tells her that he is happy to be a man of God and help people, but he does not see Him. Dan gives her a gift of a Bible after a bingo night and she gets angry.

Throughout the movie, each priest rehearses a homily:

- Dan teaches that death gives meaning to life. Enjoy life now, for we all die.
- Father Ollie teaches compassion. We all need compassion, that means to suffer with another; we need to comfort the sick and be there with the dying.
- Father Victor preaches that no one sees God, but He lives inside each of us. God, love and man are one.

One night, Father Dan invites Jane over for dinner at the rectory. Father Ollie is enjoying the food cooked by Dan. Father Victor becomes very serious and asks what Father Daniel's primary passion is, reminding them that a priest has a duty to be devoted to God only. Jane, offended, leaves. Victor asks Daniel if he has lost his faith; Father Daniel says no, that he didn't have faith, until he met Jane. Shortly after, Father Victor delivers a homily that examines the relationship between God and love. Father Daniel is then seen running to Jane's house, where he removes his clerical collar before knocking on the door.

== Cast ==
- Zachary Spicer as Father Daniel
- Wrenn Schmidt as Jane
- Danny Glover as Father Victor
- John C. McGinley as Father Ollie

== Production ==
Paul Shoulberg both wrote and directed The Good Catholic and dedicated it to his recently passed father, Donald Shoulberg. The film was Pigasus Pictures' first feature film and was produced by Zachary Spicer, John Armstrong and Graham Sheldon. The Good Catholic began filming on January 25, 2016, in Bloomington, Indiana.

== Release ==
The film premiered at the Santa Barbara International Film Festival on February 3, 2017. The film was released on September 8, 2017, by Broad Green Pictures. The film has been released on Amazon Prime streaming.

== Reception ==
The Good Catholic was accepted at the Santa Barbara Film Festival and won the Panavision Spirit Award for Best Independent Feature Film.

The film holds a 43% "Rotten" score on review aggregator Rotten Tomatoes, based on 14 critic reviews with an average rating of 5.9/10.
