= Red Light Winter =

Play by Adam Rapp

- Original language: English
- Written by: Adam Rapp

Premiere
- Date: May 30, 2005
- Place: Merle Reskin Garage Theatre

Red Light Winter is a two-act play by American playwright Adam Rapp. The Steppenwolf Theatre Company premiered the play on May 30, 2005, at their Merle Reskin Garage Theatre in Chicago. Rapp directed the production, which continued until July 10, 2005. The company took the play to New York to run Off-Broadway at the Barrow Street Theatre, where it opened for previews from January 20, 2006. It then ran there as a regular production from February 9, 2006, to June 25, 2006. In 2012 the play appeared at the Ustinov Studio in Bath, England.

== Plot ==
In the first act, friends Matt, a writer, and Davis, a book editor, are vacationing in Amsterdam. Matt is lonely and suicidal; he is attempting to hang himself when Davis returns to their shared hotel room with Christina. Christina is a prostitute that Davis has hired as a present for Matt. Christina has sex with Matt, although she is more interested in Davis. In the second act, Matt and Davis have returned home to New York City. Christina goes to New York looking for Davis, but finds Matt, who has been obsessed with her since their earlier encounter.

== Cast and characters ==
The characters and cast from the 2005 Garage Theatre production are given below; the same cast appeared at the Barrow Street Theatre in 2006.

Opening night cast
Character	Original cast
Davis	Gary Wilmes
Matt	Christopher Denham
Christina	Lisa Joyce

== Reception ==
Chicago Tribune critic Michael Phillips said the premier production was "arresting" and had excellent acting and set design, but was overlong and contained some clichés. When the New York production opened, New York Times critic Charles Isherwood complimented the dialogue and set designs, but complained that there were "too many stale ideas" in the play.

The reviewer for The Daily Telegraph complimented the Ustinov Studio production as interesting and well-acted. The reviewer for The Guardian praised it for "ferociously sharp writing" and "magnetic performances".

== Awards ==
Red Light Winter received the Joseph Jefferson Award for Best New Work in 2005 for the Garage Theatre production. The play was nominated for the 2006 Lucille Lortel Award for Outstanding Play. Rapp received the 2006 Obie Award, Special Citation, and Wilmes won an Obie for his performance. Set designer Todd Rosenthal was nominated for a Hewes Design Award. The play was a finalist for the Pulitzer Prize for Drama in 2006.
