= Preservation (film) =

- Teaser poster
- Directed by: Christopher Denham
- Written by: Christopher Denham
- Produced by: Jennifer Dubin; Cora Olson
- Starring: Wrenn Schmidt; Pablo Schreiber; Aaron Staton; Cody Saintgnue
- Cinematography: Nicola Marsh
- Edited by: Brendan Walsh
- Music by: Samuel Jones; Alexis Marsh
- Production company: Present Pictures
- Distributed by: The Orchard
- Release dates: April 17, 2014 (Tribeca Film Festival); January 9, 2015 (U.S.)
- Running time: 90 minutes
- Country: United States
- Language: English

Preservation is a 2014 horror thriller film that was directed by Christopher Denham. It had its world premiere on April 17, 2014 at the Tribeca Film Festival and stars Wrenn Schmidt as a woman trapped in a forest preserve, stalked by maniacs.

== Plot summary ==
Hoping to escape their own troubles, Wit (Wrenn Schmidt), her husband Mike (Aaron Staton), and his brother Sean (Pablo Schreiber) decide to head out into a secluded forest preserve on a hunting trip. Mike is hoping that this will help Sean deal with his PTSD while Wit is hoping that she can rekindle her sagging relationship with Mike, who seems to be more interested in spending time on his cellphone than with her. Once they reach their destination the trio is undeterred by signs proclaiming that the preserve is closed and they continue on with their vacation unabated. The already strained atmosphere is made even worse when they wake up the next morning to discover that someone has stolen all of their belongings and marked each person's forehead with a big black "X". As the trio tries to deal with their existing stresses and the new fear of being hunted, they begin to turn on one another.

== Cast ==
- Wrenn Schmidt as Wit Neary
- Aaron Staton as Mike Neary
- Pablo Schreiber as Sean Neary
- Cody Saintgnue as Jack
- Nick Saso as Ben
- Michael Chacon as Will

== Reception ==
Critical reception for Preservation has been mixed to positive. On the review aggregator website Rotten Tomatoes, 46% of 13 critics' reviews are positive. Metacritic, which uses a weighted average, assigned the film a score of 44 out of 100, based on 7 critics, indicating "mixed or average" reviews. Dread Central and Fangoria both praised the movie, and Fangoria commented that it "largely succeeds as a swift and scary survival thriller." In contrast, Slant Magazine and Film School Rejects both panned the movie overall, with Film School Rejects writing "The cast does good work, the cinematography is attractive and even the score delivers, but while the direction is (mostly) fine Denham’s script throws it all away through a non-stop assault of horror movie 101 cliches and inanity."

== Filming ==
Preservation was shot in three locations in Southern California. Originally, director Christoper Denham and crew planned to shoot in New York. However, because of the actors availability, the production moved to Southern California. Director Christopher Denham knew that shooting in Southern California would be tricky because it would be hard to find good woods and forest. In result, Preservation was shot in three locations to create one large woods location that the movie takes place in. These shooting locations were in Santa Clarita and Agua Dulce, California.

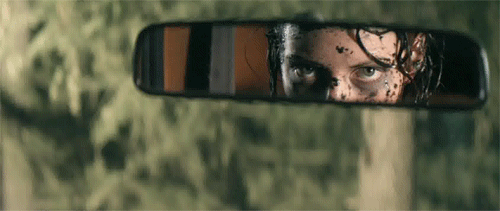
Still Frame from Preservation.

The movie was shot rather quickly in 23 days because of a tight budget and actor availability. Director Christopher Denham knew that shooting in 23 days would be a challenge. However, he was boldly faithful in his cast. Wrenn Schmidt, Aaron Staton and Pablo Schreiber all had theatre experience and were used to timely schedules and remembering lines. With a limited budget and a fast schedule, only 3 or 4 takes was allowed per shot while filming, which was a challenge for the director. However, Director Christopher Denham said that in regards to the quick work flow, "It actually became a blessing in disguise. The frantic nature of our schedule served our story well. It put the actors in a manic mindset that translates on screen."

== Cinematography and directing ==
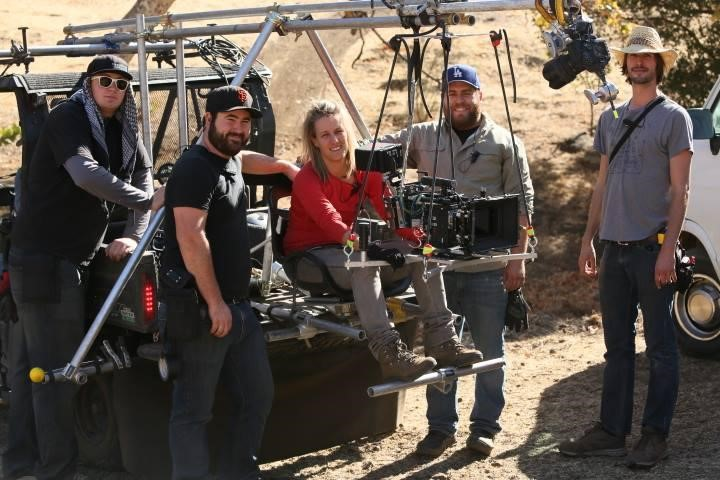
Cinematographer Nicola Marsh and crew on set of Preservation.

The director of photography for Preservation is cinematographer Nicola Marsh. The movie was shot on the Red Epic with anamorphic lenses. Director Christoper Denham and cinematographer Nicola Marsh were inspired to create a look based on the depth of field and empty frame space of movies such as Halloween and Southern Comfort. Components to cinematography such as these create a feeling of isolation around the characters. Empty frame space creates a feeling of unease, not knowing what is going to pop into the frame next, when, and if anything will at all. Cinematographer Nicola Marsh worked with diligently with Director Christopher Denham to create this feel of a "Jack In the Box", leaving the audience on a cliff hanger scene to scene. The director stating in his own words "What you don’t see, in my opinion, is always scarier than what you do. It’s really about ratcheting up the suspense.” The film had an aspect ratio of 2.35:1.

== Writing ==
Preservation was written by Director Christopher Denham. From writing to editing, the film took about 2 years to create and finish. Before and during writing Preservation, director Christopher Denham studied and analyzed John Carpenter's film Halloween. What caught his attention was the patience in the filmmaking, revealing information to the audience slowly, and leaving the audience wanting to see more. Director Christopher Denham challenged himself by writing a script with not so much blood and gore, but rather with psychological suspense that is "truly" what is scary in reality. The film was partly inspired by a hunting and camping trip that the director took in Texas with his friends. During that trip, he and his friends heard odd things in the woods such as a bike chain spinning. They did not know who was watching them, they just knew they were being watched. Director Christopher Denham was inspired by words from writer Jack London in regards to a man's survival in the woods: "A dog can be domesticated. So can a man. In the woods both remember what they are." During his hunting trip Denham wondered to himself in his situation, what would it take to push him to the bring of taking someone else's life (in the woods). All of this thought inspired his psychological thriller movie script Preservation.

== Awards and festivals ==
-Tribeca Film Festival Official Selection

-International Premiere at the Fantasia International Film Festival

-Sitges Film Festival Official Selection

== External list ==
- Preservation at IMDb
- Preservation at Rotten Tomatoes
- Preservation on Amazon
- Preservation on iTunes
- Preservation on Google Play
- Preservation on Vudu
