= Home Movie (2008 film) =

Film by Christopher Denham

- Theatrical poster
- Directed by: Christopher Denham
- Written by: Christopher Denham
- Produced by: William M. Miller; Andrew van den Houten
- Starring: Adrian Pasdar; Cady McClain; Amber Joy Williams; Austin Williams
- Cinematography: William M. Miller
- Edited by: John T. Miller
- Music by: Ryan Shore
- Distributed by: IFC Films (US); Anchor Bay Entertainment (Canada)
- Release date: July 10, 2008
- Running time: 76 minutes
- Country: United States
- Language: English

Home Movie is a 2008 American found footage psychological horror film and is the directorial debut of actor Christopher Denham.

The film received favorable reviews at Montreal’s 2008 Fantasia Film Festival. Following the final screening, bids were made on the film and IFC Entertainment acquired the U.S. rights for IFC's Festival Direct Video On Demand and DVD rights Nationwide. The film stars Adrian Pasdar, Cady McClain, Amber Joy Williams, and Austin Williams.

== Plot ==
Home Movie documents one family's descent into darkness through compilation of the Poe family's home-made video footage. In the remote woods of upstate New York, David (Adrian Pasdar) and Clare (Cady McClain) Poe are attempting to live an idyllic life. However, the Poe children are hiding a dark secret and something is wrong with ten-year-old twins Jack (Austin Williams) and Emily (Amber Joy Williams) Poe. To stop them, their parents must enter the nightmare of their children’s minds. As they try to regain control of the children’s lives, the pressing question becomes who will ultimately survive the battle.

== Soundtrack ==
The film's original score was composed by Ryan Shore.

== Reception ==
Dr. Nathan of Quiet Earth said, "This truly disturbing movie, written and directed by Christopher Denham, is thus far the only TAD premiere Dr Nathan has experienced which actually, really gave me that deep-down visceral sense of dread and foreboding." From Dread Central: "There's something about home videos that brings out the worst in people. I hadn't thought of it for years, but after seeing Christopher Denham's disturbing Home Movie, I remembered my very own forays into family camcording" ... "is better written, more realistic and more disturbing than the forefather of the modern found footage horror movie, The Blair Witch Project. In fact, Home Movie might just be the tautest, best acted, most tightly written and disturbing 'found film' ever made!"

== Release ==
After screenings at multiple festivals, the rights to DVD distribution were acquired by IFC Films for the U.S. and Anchor Bay Entertainment for Canada.
