= Criminal Investigation Task Force =

US government agency created in 2002

The Criminal Investigation Task Force (CITF) is an organization created in early 2002 by the United States Department of Defense to conduct investigations of detainees captured in the war on terrorism. It was envisioned that certain captured individuals would be tried by a military tribunal for war crimes and/or acts of terrorism.

== History ==
CITF was initially activated in February 2002 under a mandate from the Secretary of Defense addressed to the Secretary of the Army. The Secretary of the Army formally tasked the US Army Criminal Investigation Command (CID), and CID activated the Criminal Investigation Task Force solely for the purpose of conducting criminal investigations against suspected terrorists detained by US forces. Under the Secretary of Defense directive, the Army was directed to maximize the capabilities of all the Services, and therefore coordinated with the US Air Force and US Navy to assist. The CITF included members from four of five of the branches of the U.S. armed forces; Army Criminal Investigation Division (CID), the Naval Criminal Investigative Service (NCIS), the United States Marine Corps Criminal Investigation Division (USMC CID), and the Air Force Office of Special Investigations (AFOSI). Other personnel for the CITF came from military intelligence and support organizations. From time to time, liaison personnel and others from Federal Law Enforcement and other government agencies were attached to the CITF. An element from the CITF was initially deployed to Afghanistan with the goal of identifying captured terrorists, and to collect evidence for use in Military Commissions. Suspected terrorists were temporarily held at the Kandahar or Bagram Detention Facilities. Another element of the CITF was deployed to US Naval Base, Guantanamo Bay, Cuba. After the invasion of Iraq, CITF deployed yet another element to Iraq, initially to prepare for the possible transfer of detainees in Iraq to Guantanamo. Later, CITF began to collect evidence for use in the Central Criminal Court of Iraq. CITF also maintained its role in military operations by assisting Special Operations Command (SOCOM) with forensic evidence collection. In military, and law enforcement agencies, "Task Forces" are temporary organizations created to conduct a specialized mission or task. Members of "Joint Task Forces" are drawn from many different units. However, the CITF was never formally given the designation of a "Joint Task Force."

The CITF has operated worldwide and by 2005 had conducted over 1500 investigations and 10,000 interviews, and collected large amounts of evidence both in places where persons were captured and elsewhere. The results of CITF investigations has been used in military commissions (tribunals) at the Guantánamo Bay detainment camp and other legal proceedings in Afghanistan and Iraq.. The CITF has provided evidence to Iraqi Courts to prosecute insurgents and foreign fighters captured in Iraq for crimes there, and has assisted other US and international law enforcement agencies.

Following the expansion of the CITF, it developed a tailored training program for personnel assigned to the task force. In the early stages of the force's development, personnel learned many skills required for their work through on-the-job training, which could take up to three months. In March 2005, the CITF established an Agency Development Branch within its Investigations Division to formalize the training program. The branch then developed an entry-level program covering the CITF missions and structure, intelligence database and case-management systems, crime-scene examination and interview procedures. Later on the program was expanded from five days to eight days, and personnel from other departments participated in the training.

As a result of widespread criticism of reported human rights abuses at Guantanamo and in Afghanistan, Iraq, and elsewhere, most notably the Iraq prison abuse scandals, including torture and abuse at Abu Ghraib and Bagram, a great deal of media and public attention was given to the methods used by the CITF and other U.S. military and civilian agencies in interrogations and other activities.

Senior law enforcement agents with the CITF told NBC News in 2006 that they began to complain to Department of Defense officials in 2002 that the interrogation tactics used by a separate team of intelligence investigators were unproductive, not likely to produce reliable information, and probably illegal. Unable to achieve a satisfactory response from the U.S. Army commanders in charge of the detainee camp, they took their concerns to both the Army Criminal Investigation Command under General Donald Ryder, and the Naval Criminal Investigative Service under David Brant. Brant alerted Alberto J. Mora, the general counsel for the Navy. The first commander of the CITF was Colonel (now retired) Brittain Mallow, and his Deputy was Special Agent Mark Fallon. Their names have been in several articles and also mentioned during Congressional testimony.

Some copies of government documents detailing CITF policies and practices have become publicly available through after the American Civil Liberties Union filed a Freedom of Information Act request and subsequently a lawsuit. There have been numerous discussions in congress and in the press and online regarding the differences between the CITF and other law enforcement methods, and those of the intelligence organizations involved with detainees. The CITF staff by all reports appear to have used only non-coercive, non-torturous methods in questioning detainees.
