= China Doll (play) =

2015 play by David Mamet

- Written by: David Mamet
- Characters: Mickey Ross; Carson
- Original language: English
- Genre: Drama
- Setting: Manhattan apartment

Premiere
- Date premiered: 2015
- Place premiered: Broadway

China Doll is a two-act play by David Mamet about political corruption and brutal violence. The play opened on Broadway at the end of 2015 with a short run scheduled to close at the end of January 2016. The two-act play contains only two characters who appear on stage throughout the play, Mickey and Carson.

== Plot ==
=== Act One ===
Mickey is an elderly retiring political operative and political fixer in the US who is planning an elaborate May–December wedding to a young fiancé who is a British national citizen. Mickey is planning to retire in style with his great wealth by arranging for the purchase of a luxurious private jet made in Switzerland for himself and his soon-to-be wife. An entanglement arises when Mickey receives a telephone call in his office indicating that the $5 million tax-saving scheme he has planned for his private jet purchase has gone sour. The foreign Swiss jet was supposed to fully stay out of the US for six months for the $5 million tax-saving scheme to succeed. An apparently trivial malfunction caused the jet to land temporarily on US soil, thus seemingly invalidating Mickey's tax-saving scheme. Not only that, but after the jet finally arrives at its original destination in Toronto, its single passenger, his fiancé, is subjected to a full strip search while being refused entry into Canada. Mickey goes ballistic when he receives this telephone report in his office. He threatens to renege on delivery of the jet on which he still has not fully signed off, and he suspects mischief from a new political candidate and contender in the US with whom he has a history. Mickey begins to suspect that the new candidate, known to him as "the Kid", is the source of upsetting Mickey's $5 million tax saving scheme, and for causing the false report in Toronto which caused his fiancé to be denied entry in Canada and to be strip searched.

=== Act Two ===
By the next morning, Mickey realizes that he may have overplayed his hand in lashing out against the jet manufacturer, against his assistant Carson, and against the political operatives of "the Kid". "The Kid" is likely to be the next governor of his State, with many inside ties and favors coming his way from the Federal government by way of "the Kid's" inside government connections. Mickey's worst nightmare comes true when he receives a phone call in his office telling him that "the Kid" has pulled in his Federal government "favors" in order to get Mickey formally charged with a Federal indictment for violation and conspiracy against the Foreign Corrupt Practices Act, since the jet purchase he was arranging originated under Swiss manufacture from a Swiss contract. Mickey's only life-line is a dirty-secrets political file he has kept on "the Kid's" family of political office holders, and Mickey uses it to make a plea deal on the phone to "buy" himself out of the Federal Indictment on him against the Foreign Corrupt Practices Act. The deal requires his assistant, Carson, to play along, since Federal marshals have already been dispatched to arrest Mickey. Carson decides that Mickey is not to be trusted, and that Mickey will sell Carson out as part of Mickey's own plea deal. Carson resolves to abscond with Mickey's dirty-secrets political file right under Mickey's eyes, in order to let himself make his own exonerating plea deal for himself. Mickey gets the jump on Carson before Carson can get out the door and mortally bludgeons him with a heavy-gauge metallic scale model of the jet which he was about to purchase. As the dispatched federal marshalls are heard knocking at his office door, Mickey reverses his tactics once again and starts self-inflicting bloody wounds on his own body while shouting to the federal marshals standing outside his door, "Help me. Will... Will... Oh my God. Will no one help an old man...?", at the final curtain as the play ends.

== List of characters ==
- Mickey, a retiring elderly political operative and political fixer.
- Carson, his in-office assistant and secretary.

Several off-stage characters are portrayed as participating in telephone conversation with Mickey while Mickey is in his private office whose voices are not heard during the play, but only inferred by Mickey's interaction with them while speaking into his telephone on stage.

== Production ==
The play began previews on Broadway at the Gerald Schoenfeld Theatre on October 21, 2015 with the official opening originally scheduled for November 19. On November 9, 2015, the producers announced that the official opening was moved to December 4, 2015, stating "The move allows the creative team additional time to work on the play before its world premiere." The play opened on December 4, 2015 in a limited engagement for 97 performances.

Al Pacino plays billionaire "Mickey Ross" and Christopher Denham plays his assistant "Carson" in the two-character play. The play is directed by Pam MacKinnon, with scenery by Derek McLane, lighting by Russell H. Champa and costumes by Jess Goldstein.

Pacino said of his character and the play: "...'one of the most daunting and challenging roles I've been given to explore onstage. It's a special gift to originate a role in the theatre, especially written by such a formidable writer, and I haven't done that in a long, long time...' "

On January 21, 2016, Playbill reported that the producer of the play Jeffrey Richards summarized the short-run on Broadway stating: "It’s been ultimately very rewarding because of the work that’s been done during the actual run of the play. The ending has been changed by the playwright, and the audiences have embraced it recently, which has been very encouraging."

== Reception ==
Critical reception for China Doll has been largely negative. Michael Riedel, theatre columnist for the New York Post called it a "terrible new play"... "Preview audiences are having none of it. The exodus at intermission is practically a stampede, and sources say some have angrily demanded refunds."

After a retooling of the play, the December 2015 review in The New York Times said "One of the biggest problems (though not the only one) in comprehending China Doll is that Mr. Pacino's lurching, stammering performance is not easy to follow in terms of content, character or subtext. There has been more than enough evidence in the past to certify that Mr. Pacino is a bona fide genius, so let's assume that there are reasons for what he's doing here."

In January 2016 review of the play, PopMatters magazine wrote "For all of its follies, China Doll, which has a limited run at Manhattan's Gerald Schoenfeld Theatre, is unlike anything Mamet has written before", and "In the abstract China Doll sounds like a rigorous but doable challenge; in performance, the play outstays its welcome. This two scene and nearly two hour play has, at most, enough dramatic momentum for one act."

Variety magazine in May 2016 summarized China Doll as having suffered from "bad-buzz" media coverage once plans for Mamet's new 2017 play were announced stating: "David Mamet's first play following the bad-buzz magnet China Doll has been added to the 2016–17 season at the Atlantic Theater Company, the Off Broadway troupe that Mamet co-founded... Details are scarce on the latest from Mamet, whose Broadway outing China Doll stirred up controversy and crummy word of mouth earlier this season but still turned a profit. The untitled new play, to be directed by Atlantic artistic director Neil Pepe, is described as written 'specifically for Atlantic’s ensemble,' and will run February through April on the theater's mainstage, with exact dates to be set."
