= Mark Fallon =

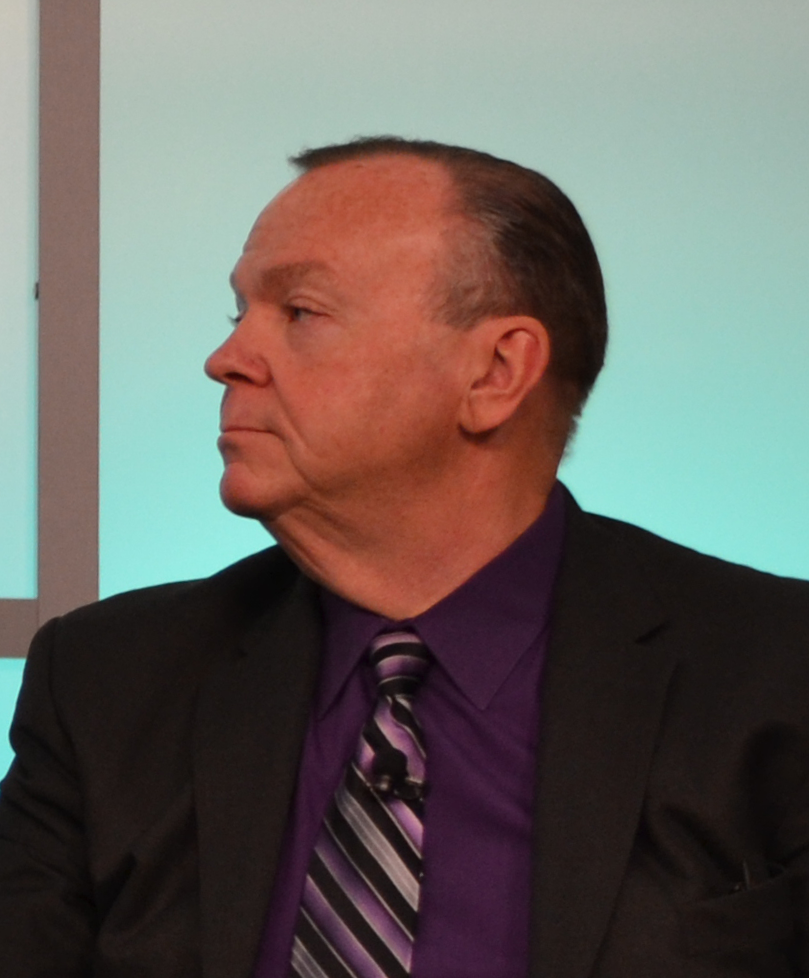
- Fallon in 2015
- Occupation: Counter-terrorism expert
- Known for: objecting to the use of torture in interrogation

Mark Fallon is a former Naval Criminal Investigative Service special agent and counter-terrorism expert from the United States. He was the director of the Criminal Investigative Task Force at the US Military's Guantanamo detention camp, for two and half years, where his organization conducted a parallel and independent series interrogations and intelligence analysis from that conducted by Joint Task Force Guantanamo, the CIA and the FBI.

Fallon tried to use his influence to prevent torture from being employed at Guantanamo, emphasizing skills from police work of building rapport. "Our folks would sit on the ground with detainees having tea," Fallon told investigative reporter Bill Dedman of NBC News in the first report on the unit's efforts in 2006. "Many of the detainees wanted also to be released. And our goal was to obtain accurate information. A good investigator works hard to prove guilt or innocence." The NCIS team "suggested alternatives to the Army commanders in charge of the Guantanamo intelligence interrogations ... refused to participate in interrogations they felt were abusive; reported any signs of criminal acts by the intelligence interrogators; blocked an FBI plan to move Mohammed al-Qahtani to another country where he could be tortured; and threatened to remove their investigators from Guantanamo entirely if they were forced to watch abusive interrogations," NBC reported.

But they were shut out of decisions by the Bush administration. According to Ben Taub, writing in the New Yorker magazine in 2019, by August 2002 "Fallon's élite interagency criminal-investigation task force had been sidelined."

Following his time in Government service Fallon became a vocal critic of the US Intelligence Establishment's counter-terrorism efforts.

On 2008 Fallon joined The Soufan Group, a security firm founded by Ali Soufan, a former FBI counter-terrorism expert who also became a critic of the narrative common from members of the US Intelligence Establishment.

In 2017 Fallon published "Unjustifiable Means: The Inside Story of How the CIA, Pentagon, and US Government Conspired to Torture." Fallon said that he faced significant resistance from the government in publishing his book, including extended delays and censorship of 113 passages, often for information that was already part of the congressional record. Department of Defense spokesman Darrell Walker disputed claims the Government was trying to suppress publication of his book. Rather, he said, the Government imposed delays were due to his book requiring review from ten different Government agencies.

The American Civil Liberties Union mounted a defense of Fallon's First Amendment right to free speech, and contacted several members of Congress.

Fallon and Maria Hartwig, a psychologist at John Jay College of Criminal Justice at City University of New York, are developing a training curriculum for investigators based in actual science related to lying and deception.

== Principles on Effective Interviewing for Investigations and Information Gathering (Méndez Principles) ==
In 2016 the Special Rapporteur on torture and other cruel, inhuman or degrading treatment or punishment, Prof. Juan E. Méndez, submitted a thematic report to the United Nations General Assembly calling for the development of international standards for interviews based on scientific research, legal safeguards and ethical principles. Mark Fallon was a member of the global Steering Committee who guided the process of drafting such a document, consulting an Advisory Council comprising more than 80 experts from over 40 countries. In 2021, the Principles on Effective Interviewing for Investigations and Information Gathering was approved by the Steering Committee to realize the call. These principles are also referred to as the Méndez Principles to honor Juan Méndez.
