= Adam Rapp =

American writer

- Born: June 15, 1968 (age 58); Chicago, Illinois, U.S.
- Education: Clarke University (BA); Juilliard School (GrDip)
- Occupations: Playwright; novelist; director; screenwriter
- Relatives: Anthony Rapp (brother)

Adam Rapp (born June 15, 1968) is an American novelist, playwright, screenwriter, musician and film director. His play Red Light Winter was a Pulitzer Prize finalist in 2006.

== Early life ==
Rapp was born in Chicago to Mary Lee (née Baird) and Douglas Rapp, and spent most of his youth in Joliet, Illinois.

He is a graduate of St. John's Military Academy (Delafield, Wisconsin) and Clarke College (Dubuque, Iowa). At Clarke, he captained the varsity basketball team.

After college he moved to New York City's East Village, where he landed a day job in book publishing and wrote fiction and plays at night. He later completed a two-year playwriting fellowship at Juilliard School. His younger brother is actor-singer Anthony Rapp.

== Career ==
=== Plays ===
Rapp attended the O'Neill Playwrights Conference in 1996. His play Finer Noble Gases was staged by the Eugene O'Neill Theatre in 2000, by Actors Theatre of Louisville in 2001, by Carolina Actors Studio Theatre in Charlotte in 2003, and by Rattlestick Playwrights Theater in New York City in 2004. In 2001, Nocturne was premiered by the New York Theatre Workshop. It has also been staged at by American Repertory Theater and Berkeley Repertory Theatre. His play Stone Cold Dead Serious was produced in 2002 by the American Repertory Theater.

His play Red Light Winter received the Joseph Jefferson Award (Best New Work) in 2005 for its production at Steppenwolf Theatre Company. The play ran off-Broadway at the Barrow Street Theatre from January 20, 2006, to June 25, 2006, directed by Rapp. The play was nominated for the 2006 Lucille Lortel Award, Outstanding Play, and Rapp received the 2006 Obie Award, Special Citation. The play was a finalist for the Pulitzer Prize for Drama in 2006.

Rapp directed a production of Los Angeles, by Julian Sheppard, in 2007 at the Flea Theatre. In 2011, Rapp's The Metal Children was given its regional debut by Swine Palace on Louisiana State University's campus.

He has said that the Edge Theater Company in New York City is his "artistic home": "Edge Theater changed my life back in 2003. They are my family."

He made his Broadway debut with his play The Sound Inside, which began playing at Studio 54 starting on September 14, 2019 (opening officially on October 17, 2019), starring Mary-Louise Parker. The play premiered at the Williamstown Theatre Festival in 2018. It was nominated for the Tony Award for Best Play at the 74th Tony Awards.

Rapp wrote on the book for The Outsiders: A New Musical, a re-imagination of the 1967 S. E. Hinton novel and the 1983 Francis Ford Coppola film adaptation. Broadway performances began on March 16, 2024, at the Bernard Jacobs Theatre in New York City. Rapp was nominated with his co-author Justin Levine for the 2024 Tony Award for Best Book of a Musical. The musical won the 2024 Tony Award for Best Musical.

=== Teaching ===
He has taught at the Yale School of Drama.

=== Style ===
The majority of Rapp's plays feature small casts and are set in small spaces. Many characters in the plays are working class Americans. His plays often combine stories of Midwestern longing with the idea of finding escape in New York. He combines humor with gloom, preferring dark themes

In a conversation with fellow playwright Gina Gionfriddo published in The Brooklyn Rail, Rapp says: "When you see something powerfully acted on stage, it hits a nerve in the way music hits a nerve … Watching someone twelve feet from you falling in love or being abused … There’s something raw about that experience that you don’t get from film or TV."

=== Novels ===
Rapp's first young adult novel, Missing the Piano, was published in 1994. After writing his second book, The Buffalo Tree, which was published in 1997, Rapp was invited to be the first author in residence at Ridgewood High School. The Buffalo Tree was censored by the Muhlenberg School Board in Reading, Pennsylvania due to its themes, graphic language and sexual content. His 2003 novel 33 Snowfish was one of Young Adult Library Services Association's Top Ten Best Books for Young Adults. He released Under the Wolf, Under the Dog in 2004.

His first adult novel, The Year of Endless Sorrows, was released in 2006. Rapp made his graphic novel debut with the release of Ball Peen Hammer in September 2009. His second graphic novel, Decelerate Blue, was published in February 2017.

=== Film, television and music ===
Rapp directed his first film, Winter Passing, with Zooey Deschanel and Will Ferrell in 2005 and was a creative consultant for the television show The L Word.

While working on The L Word, Rapp left in the middle of the season to attend the Edinburgh Festival, where he directed his play, Finer Noble Gases, which won the Fringe First Award. He wrote for the 2010 season of HBO's In Treatment.

He was a member of the band Bottomside, which released the independent CD The Element Man in September 2004. He is a member of Less the Band, which released the album Bear in April 2006.

In 2021, he co-wrote the pilot episode "Cold Snap" for the Showtime special event series Dexter: New Blood.

== List of works ==
=== Theatre ===
- Dreams of the Salthorse (2000)
- Nocturne (2000)
- Animals and Plants (2001)
- Train Story (short play, 2001)
- Finer Noble Gases (2002)
- Faster (2002)
- Trueblinka (2002)
- Stone Cold Dead Serious (2003)
- Blackbird (2004)
- Gompers (2004)
- Members Only (short play, 2005)
- Red Light Winter (2005)
- Essential Self-Defense (2006)
- Bingo with the Indians (2007)
- American Sligo (2008)
- Kindness (2008)
- Classic Kitchen Timer (short play, 2009)
- The Metal Children (2010)
- Ghosts in the Cottonwoods (2011)
- The Hallway Trilogy (2011), Part One: Rose, Part Two: Paraffin, Part Three: Nursing
- The Edge of Our Bodies (2011)
- Dreams of Flying Dreams of Falling (2011)
- Through the Yellow Hour (2012)
- Wolf in the River (2016)
- The Purple Lights of Joppa Illinois (2016)
- The Sound Inside (2018)
- The Outsiders (2023)

=== Novels ===
- The Year of Endless Sorrows (2006)
- Know Your Beholder (2015)
- Wolf at the Table (2024)

=== Young adult novels ===
- Missing the Piano (1994)
- The Buffalo Tree (1997)
- The Copper Elephant (1999)
- Little Chicago (2002)
- 33 Snowfish (2003)
- Under the Wolf, Under the Dog (2004)
- Punkzilla (2009)
- The Children and the Wolves (2012)
- Decelerate Blue (2017)
- Fum (2018)

=== Screenwriter ===
- The Jury (2004)
- Winter Passing (2005)
- The L Word (2006)
- Blackbird (2007)
- In Treatment (2010)
- Flesh and Bone (2015)
- Vinyl (2016)
- The Looming Tower (2018)
- American Rust (2021)
- Dexter: New Blood (2021)

=== Film director ===
- Winter Passing (2005)
- Blackbird (2007)
- Loitering with Intent (2014)

== Awards ==
Source: Gale

Year	Award	Work	Outcome
1995	American Library Association, Best Books for Young Adults	Missing the Piano	Won
1995	American Library Association, Best Books for Reluctant Readers citation	Missing the Piano	Won
1997	National Playwrights Conference, Herbert & Patricia Brodkin Scholarship	Trueblinka	Won
1999	Princess Grace Fellowship		Won
2000	Kennedy Center Fund for New American Plays, Roger L. Stevens Award		Won
2001	Helen Merrill Award for Emerging Playwrights	Nocturne	Won
2004	American Library Association, Best Books for Young Adults	33 Snowfish	Won
2004	Los Angeles Times Book Prize for Young Adult Novel	Under the Wolf, Under the Dog	Finalist
2005	American Library Association, Best Books for Young Adults	Under the Wolf, Under the Dog	Won
2006	Pulitzer Prize for Drama	Red Light Winter	Nominated
2006	Obie Award	Red Light Winter	Won
2006	Schneider Family Book Award, teen category	Under the Wolf, Under the Dog	Won
2007	Drama Desk Award for Outstanding Music in a Play	Essential Self-Defense	Nominated
2010	Michael L. Printz Award Honor Book	Punkzilla	Won
2012	PEN/Laura Pels International Foundation for Theater Award		Won
2020	Tony Award for Best Play	The Sound Inside	Nominated
2024	Tony Award for Best Book of a Musical	The Outsiders	Nominated
