= John C. McGinley =

American actor (born 1959)

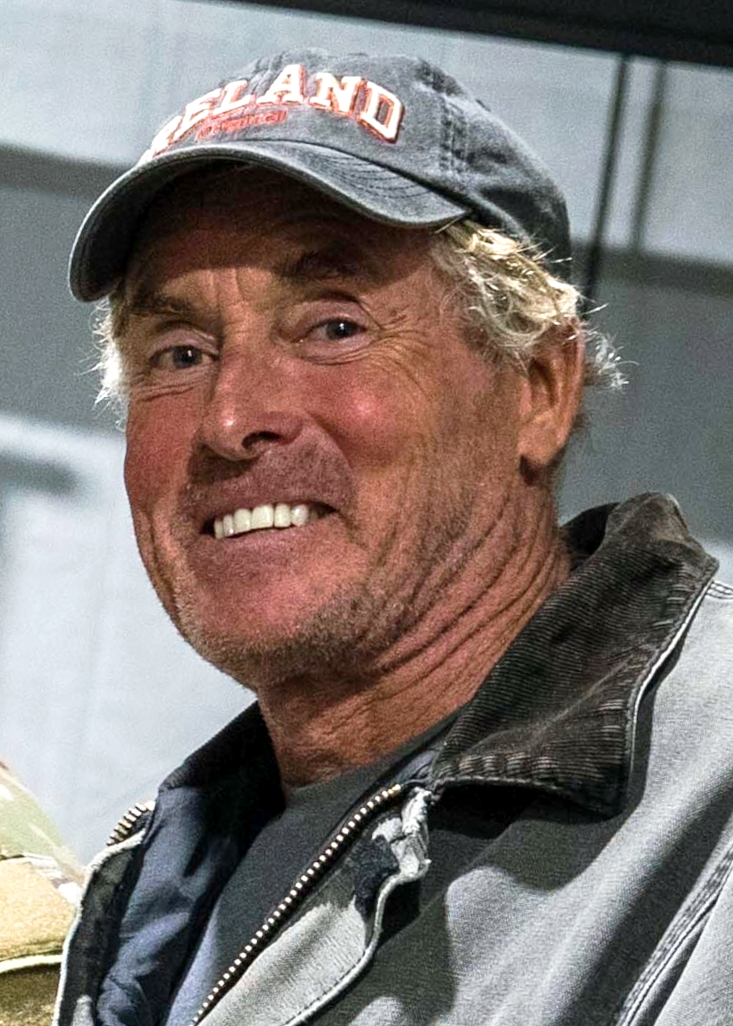
- McGinley in 2022
- Born: John Christopher McGinley; August 3, 1959 (age 67); New York City, U.S.
- Education: Syracuse University (BFA); New York University (MFA)
- Occupations: Actor; voice actor; producer; author; activist; spokesman; writer
- Years active: 1984–present
- Spouses: Lauren Lambert (m. 1997; div. 2001) Nichole Kessler (m. 2007)
- Children: 3

John Christopher McGinley (born August 3, 1959) is an American actor. He plays Perry Cox in Scrubs, Bob Slydell in Office Space, Captain Hendrix in The Rock, Sergeant Red O'Neill in Oliver Stone's Platoon, Marv in Stone's Wall Street, FBI agent Ben Harp in Point Break, and the serial killer Edgler Foreman Vess in the TV miniseries of Intensity.

== Early life ==
McGinley, who is one of five children, was born in the Greenwich Village section of New York City, the son of a schoolteacher and a stockbroker. His paternal great-grandfather was from County Donegal in Ulster, Ireland. McGinley was raised in Short Hills, New Jersey, and attended Millburn High School, where he played wide receiver for the school's football team. He studied acting at Syracuse University, and later at New York University's Graduate Acting Program at the Tisch School of the Arts, graduating in 1984. Upon completing his education, McGinley did a variety of different work, including off-Broadway and Broadway productions, and a two-year stint on the soap opera Another World.

== Career ==
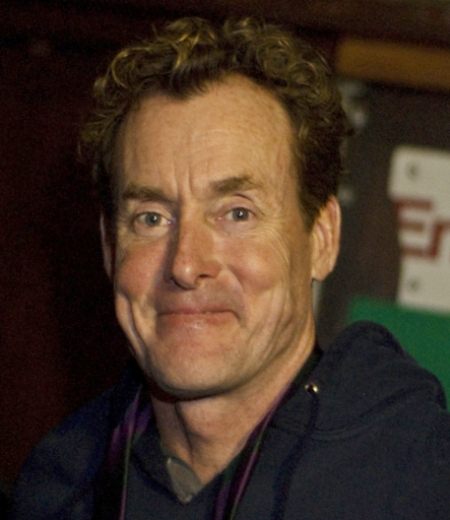
McGinley in 2008

McGinley was noticed by a casting scout while working as John Turturro's understudy in John Patrick Shanley's 1984 production of Danny and the Deep Blue Sea, which led to a successful audition for the role of Sergeant Red O'Neill in the Oscar-winning Platoon (1986). McGinley had been cast in his first film role in Alan Alda's Sweet Liberty earlier in 1986. That was followed the next year with Wall Street, and in 1988 with Talk Radio. He was featured in a 1980s Subaru commercial. He appeared in the "Celebrity Challenge" version of American Gladiators, losing to Dean Cain. McGinley wrote the script for, and co-starred in, the 1990 film Suffering Bastards.

McGinley worked continually throughout the 1990s, appearing in films such as Point Break (1991), Highlander II: The Quickening (1991), Article 99 (1992), Wagons East (1994), Seven (1995), The Rock (1996), Set It Off (1996), Nothing to Lose (1997) and Office Space (1999). In 2007, he had a role as Chuck in the film Are We Done Yet? and a small role as a gay highway patrolman in the film Wild Hogs. He has done voice-over work on animated television series, including the superhero The Atom on several episodes of Justice League Unlimited, a guest appearance as "The White Shadow", the secret government agent overseeing Huey Freeman on The Boondocks, voicing The Whammer on the PBS Kids Go! series WordGirl as well as the lead character in the Sony PSP video game Dead Head Fred.

McGinley received critical acclaim for his performance as a serial killer in Dean Koontz's suspense drama Intensity (1997). It became Fox Television's highest-rated miniseries. He worked with Koontz and Fox once more in Sole Survivor (2000). In 2001, McGinley began work as a regular on the NBC television series Scrubs as the acerbic Dr. Perry Cox. Throughout the series Dr. Cox acts as an unwilling mentor to the protagonist J.D. (Zach Braff). McGinley has said that there are three things over the course of the series that he improvises: his constant usage of girls' names for JD, which he does with all his real friends; his whistle, which he describes as "a bad habit"; and his habit of touching his nose, a tribute to Robert Redford's character in The Sting, and which he says means "It's gonna be OK".

Since the NFL season of 2007, McGinley has played the "Commish" of the More Taste League commercials for Miller Lite. He has done commercials for the Champions Tour, a professional golf tour for men over the age of 50. In 2008, McGinley was the narrator of the documentary of the 2008 Stanley Cup Championship of the Detroit Red Wings. In 2009, McGinley started narrating commercials for ESPN.com.

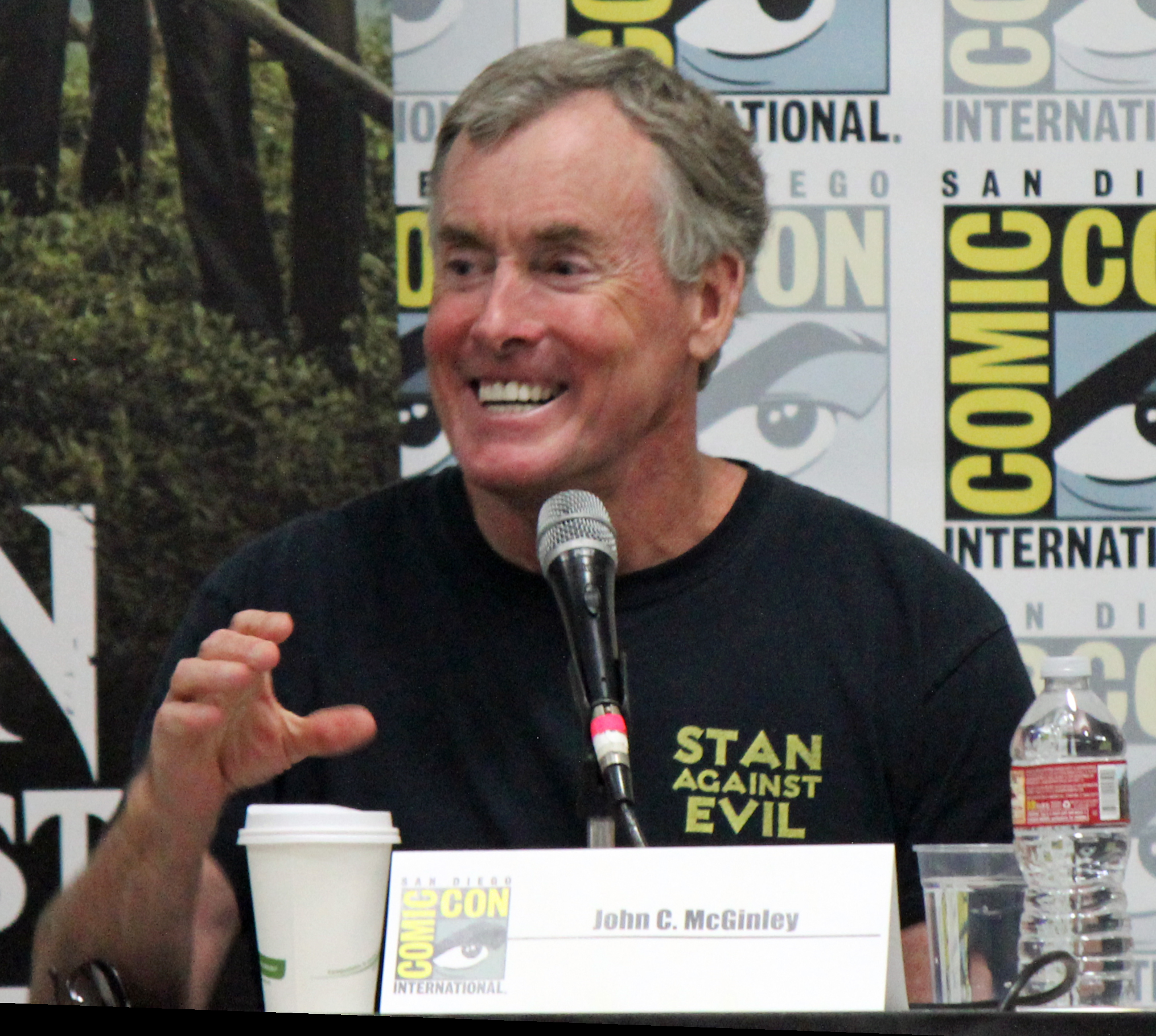
McGinley speaking at the Stan Against Evil panel during the 2017 Comic-Con International at the San Diego Convention Center

McGinley wrote a 2005 book titled Untalkative Bunny: How to be Heard Without Saying a Word, which featured the title character from the show Untalkative Bunny on its cover. In 2008, McGinley was named an Honorary Patron of the University Philosophical Society, Trinity College, Dublin. In 2009, he was cast in the film adaptation of the comic book Superman/Batman: Public Enemies, voicing Metallo. In 2012, it was announced that McGinley would be a recurring character on USA Network's Burn Notice as Michael Westen's original CIA trainer, Tom Card. He was first introduced in the second episode of the show's sixth season. In the same year, he appeared in a State Farm insurance commercial as a father wanting his college graduate son to move out.

In 2013, McGinley began the Broadway revival of Glengarry Glen Ross as Dave Moss, saying it was "the best couple of months of my life". In the same year, it was announced that TBS made a series order for the television series Ground Floor, which stars McGinley. The series was canceled in 2015 after two seasons. In October 2014, McGinley hosted The E Street Radio channel on SiriusXM20 radio, discussing his appreciation of Bruce Springsteen's music, and their shared New Jersey roots. From 2016 to 2018, he starred in the horror comedy television series, Stan Against Evil on IFC. McGinley played a crusty retired sheriff who reluctantly helps his perky replacement fight the demons that have taken over their small town.

== Personal life ==
In February 1997, McGinley married Lauren Lambert. Their son, Max, who has Down syndrome, was born that year. In December 2001, Lambert and McGinley divorced. In October 2002, he was chosen as "Dad of the Month" at now-defunct iParenting.com. In August 2006, McGinley became engaged to yoga instructor Nichole Kessler in Malibu, whom he had dated for two years. The couple married in a private ceremony at their home on April 7, 2007. They have two daughters.

McGinley owns a stake in one of Billy Gilroy's New York SoHo bistros, along with fellow actor Willem Dafoe. McGinley serves on the board of the Global Down Syndrome Foundation, based in Denver. He is a celebrity Ambassador for the National Down Syndrome Society. In addition, he is a Global Ambassador for Special Olympics and was an integral part in crafting its "R-word: Spread the Word, To End the Word" campaign. McGinley is a vocal supporter for the disabled community, and commented in late 2011 on the experience of raising a teenager with Down syndrome along with two young daughters:

[Billie's] biggest strength is language. She's extraordinarily verbal, and Max's biggest challenge is his lack of spoken language. He can read at a certain level and do arithmetic, but he doesn't form sentences well. So parenting Max and parenting Billie represent two polar opposites on the spoken-word spectrum. How we parent them in the same household and find a happy middle has been really interesting and continues to be.

McGinley is a fan of the NHL Detroit Red Wings, and wears a Red Wings jersey (usually Chris Chelios) in several Scrubs episodes. He was the narrator of the 2008 Championship DVD of the Red Wings. He maintains a home in Malibu, California, and is well known as a member of the "Malibu Mob", a group of celebrity friends and neighbors including John Cusack, Tony Danza, former Detroit Red Wings defenseman Chris Chelios, big-wave surfer Laird Hamilton, beach volleyball pro Gabrielle Reece, and tennis player John McEnroe. McGinley enjoys going golfing with John Cusack in his free time, and is a member of the Sherwood Lake Club.

On September 11, 2001, McGinley's brother, Mark, was working on the 62nd floor of the South Tower of the World Trade Center in Manhattan. John said his brother felt his desk shake after the North Tower was hit, which prompted him to get up and exit the building. Mark made his way downstairs about 20 floors, before his tower was then hit. Mark received a concussion while going down the stairs after the South Tower was hit and, due to the effects of the concussion, Mark was so disoriented that he walked up FDR Drive all the way to East Harlem. John stated that his brother was missing for approximately 12 hours after the Towers were hit.

== Filmography ==
=== Film ===
Year	Title	Role	Notes
1986	Sweet Liberty	Floyd	
1986	Platoon	Sergeant Red O'Neill	
1987	Wall Street	Marvin	
1988	Talk Radio	Stu	
1988	Shakedown	Sean Phillips	
1989	Lost Angels	Dr. Farmer	
1989	Born on the Fourth of July	Official No. 1 – Democratic Convention, Pushing Wheelchair	
1989	Fat Man and Little Boy	Captain Richard Schoenfield, MD	
1989	Suffering Bastards	Buddy Johnson	Also writer
1991	Point Break	FBI Director Ben Harp	
1991	Highlander II: The Quickening	David Blake	
1991	Little Noises	Stu	
1992	Article 99	Dr. Rudy Bobrick	
1992	Cruel Doubt	Attorney Jim Vos Burgh	
1992	A Midnight Clear	Major Griffin	
1993	Mother's Boys	Mr. Fogel	
1993	Hear No Evil	Mickey O'Malley	
1993	Watch It	Rick	Also producer
1994	On Deadly Ground	MacGruder	
1994	Surviving the Game	John Griffin	
1994	Car 54, Where Are You?	Officer Francis Muldoon	
1994	Wagons East	Julian Rogers	
1995	Born to Be Wild	Max Carr	
1995	Seven	SWAT Leader California	
1995	Nixon	Earl in Training Film	
1996	The Rock	Marine Captain Hendrix	
1996	Set It Off	Detective Strode	
1996	Mother	Carl	
1996	Johns	Danny Cohen	
1997	Flypaper	Joe	
1997	Colin Fitz Lives!	Colin Fitz	
1997	Intensity	Edgler Foreman Vess	
1997	Truth or Consequences, N.M.	Eddie Grillo	
1997	Nothing to Lose	Davis 'Rig' Lanlow	
1998	Target Earth	Agent Vincent Naples	
1999	Office Space	Bob Slydell	
1999	Any Given Sunday	Jack Rose	
1999	Three to Tango	Josh Strauss	
1999	The Jack Bull	Woody	
2000	Get Carter	Con McCarty	
2001	Summer Catch	Hugh Alexander	Uncredited
2001	The Animal	Sergeant Doug Sisk	
2002	Stealing Harvard	Detective Charles	
2002	Highway	Johnny 'The Fox'	
2002	Crazy as Hell	Parker	
2002	It's a Very Merry Muppet Christmas Movie	Himself	
2003	Identity	George York	
2005	Lil' Pimp	Man Cub Master	Voice
2005	Alien Planet	Narrator	
2006	Puff, Puff, Pass	Jerry Dupree	
2006	A.W.O.L.	Garris	
2006	Two Tickets to Paradise	Mark	Won - Method Fest - Festival Directors Award
2006	World Trade Center	Fireman	Uncredited
2007	Wild Hogs	Gay Highway Patrolman	
2007	Are We Done Yet?	Chuck Mitchell Jr.	
2008	American Crude	Jim	
2009	Life's a Trip	Mark Hewson	
2009	Superman/Batman: Public Enemies	Metallo	Voice, direct-to-video
2012	Alex Cross	Richard Brookwell	
2012	Watercolor Postcards	Merlin	
2013	42	Red Barber	
2014	Kid Cannabis	John Grefard	
2016	Get a Job	Diller	
2016	The Belko Experiment	Wendell Dukes	
2016	The Drowning	Teddy	
2017	Battle of the Sexes	Herb	
2017	The Good Catholic	Father Ollie	
2018	Benched	Don	

=== Television ===
Year	Title	Role	Notes
1985–1986	Another World	Ned Barry	12 episodes
1988	Clinton and Nadine	Turner	Television film
1988	Spenser: For Hire	K.C.	1 episode
1993	The Last Outlaw	Wills	Television film
1994	Frasier	Danny Kriezel	Episode: "Seat of Power"
1995	American Gladiators	Himself	Episode: "Celebrity Challenge"
1997	The Practice	Attorney Leonard Goode	2 episodes
1997	Intensity	Edgler Foreman Vess	Television film
1998	The Pentagon Wars	Colonel J.D. Bock	Television film
2000	Sole Survivor	Victor Yates	Television film
2001	The Nightmare Room	Dr. Young	Episode: "Four Eyes"
2001–2010	Scrubs	Dr. Perry Cox	Main role Nominated - TCA Award for Individual Achievement in Comedy (2002); Nominated - Satellite Award for Best Actor – Television Series Musical or Comedy (2002)
2002	Clone High	Creepy Trucker	Voice, episode: "Sleep of Faith: La Rue D'Awakening"
2003	Kim Possible	Rudolph Farnsworth / White Stripe	Voice, episode: "The Fearless Ferret"
2003	Justice League	Executive	Voice, episode: "Wild Cards"
2003	Spider-Man: The New Animated Series	Richard Damien	Voice, 2 episodes
2003–2005	Justice League Unlimited	The Atom	Voice, 3 episodes
2005	Alien Planet	Narrator	
2005	American Dragon: Jake Long	Dr. Diente	Voice, episode: "The Legend of the Dragon Tooth"
2006–2010	The Boondocks	The White Shadow	Voice, 2 episodes
2008	Robot Chicken	Mahmoud Ahmadinejad / Double Dare Host	Voice, episode: "Chirlaxx"
2008–2015	WordGirl	The Whammer	Voice, 4 episodes
2009	Scrubs: Interns	Dr. Perry Cox	1 episode
2011	Dan Vs.	Imposter Dan	Voice, 2 episodes
2012	Burn Notice	Tom Card	Recurring role (season 6), 6 episodes
2013–2015	Ground Floor	Remington Stewart Mansfield	Main role
2016–2018	Stan Against Evil	Stanley Miller	Main role
2019	Chicago P.D.	Brian Kelton	Recurring role (season 6), 7 episodes
2019–2022	DreamWorks Dragons: Rescue Riders	Grumblegard	Voice, recurring role
2021	Brooklyn Nine-Nine	Frank O'Sullivan	Guest role (season 8), 4 episodes
2023	C*A*U*G*H*T	Axel Johannes	4 episodes
2024	Genius	Lyndon B. Johnson	2 episodes
2025	Hamster & Gretel	Dr. Fry	Voice, episode: "Paging Doctor Potatini/Snazzy Pantzz"
2026–present	Scrubs	Dr. Perry Cox	Recurring role
2026–present	Rooster	Walter Mann	Main role

== Awards and nominations ==
Year	Award	Category	Work	Result
2002	Television Critics Association Awards	Individual Achievement in Comedy	Scrubs	Nominated
2002	Online Film & Television Association Award	Best Actor in a New Comedy Series	Scrubs	Won
2002	Online Film & Television Association Award	Best Supporting Actor in a Comedy Series	Scrubs	Won
2002	Satellite Awards	Best Performance by an Actor in a Series, Comedy or Musical	Scrubs	Nominated
2006	Method Fest	Festival Director's Award	Two Tickets to Paradise	Won
