= Aaron Staton =

American actor (born 1980)

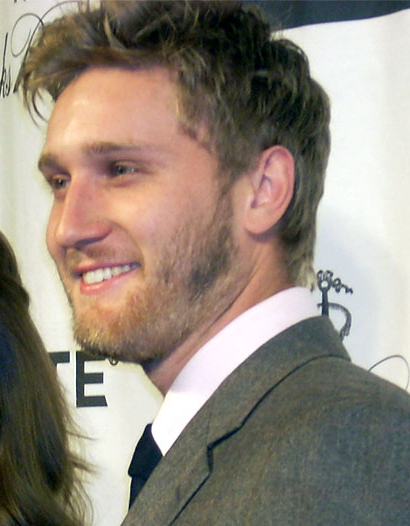
- Staton in 2008
- Born: August 10, 1980 (age 46); Huntington, West Virginia, U.S.
- Education: Carnegie Mellon University (BFA)
- Occupation: Actor
- Years active: 2004–present
- Known for: Mad Men; L.A. Noire
- Spouse: Connie Fletcher

Aaron Staton (born August 10, 1980) is an American actor. He played Ken Cosgrove on the AMC series Mad Men (2007–15) and Cole Phelps in the video game L.A. Noire (2011), for which he was nominated for a BAFTA Award for Best Performer.

== Early life ==
Staton was born in Huntington, West Virginia. He moved to Jacksonville, Florida, at the age of 9. He met his wife, actress Connie Fletcher, during their high school years while performing in community theater. They played husband and wife of each other's characters in L.A. Noire.

== Career ==
Staton won a Screen Actors Guild Award for Outstanding Performance by an Ensemble in a Drama Series in 2008 and 2009 with the cast of Mad Men. He has made appearances on shows such as 7th Heaven, Law & Order: Special Victims Unit and Without a Trace. He performed extensive facial capture and voice acting for the video game L.A. Noire, in which he plays protagonist Cole Phelps.

== Filmography ==
=== Film ===
Year	Title	Role	Notes
2007	Descent	Jared's Friend	
2007	I Believe in America	Rodney	
2007	The Nanny Diaries	John	
2007	One Night	Leroy	
2007	August Rush	Nick	
2010	Boy Meets Girl	Boy	Short
2011	Lost Revolution	Rodney	
2014	Preservation	Mike Neary	
2017	Alex & The List	Michael	
2025	Anesthesia	Michael	Short

=== Television ===
Year	Title	Role	Notes
2005	Law & Order: Special Victims Unit	Andy Wall	Episode: "Hooked"
2006	7th Heaven	Daniel	Recurring Cast: Season 11
2007	Without a Trace	Hugh Dolan	Episode: "Crash and Burn"
2007–15	Mad Men	Ken Cosgrove	Main Cast
2008	Imaginary Bitches	Bruce	Episode: "A New Leper in the Colony"
2011	The Good Wife	Todd Roda	Guest Cast: Season 2-3
2013	Newsreaders	Ethan Lexworth	Episode: "Auto Erotic"
2013	Person of Interest	Hayden Price	Episode: "The Perfect Mark"
2015–16	Ray Donovan	Greg Donellen	Recurring Cast: Season 3, Guest: Season 4
2016	My Mother and Other Strangers	Captain Ronald Dreyfuss	Main Cast
2016–17	Girlfriends' Guide to Divorce	JD	Recurring Cast: Season 2-3, Guest: Season 4
2018	For the People	Todd Hardart	Episode: "The Liberty Fountain"
2018	Narcos: Mexico	Butch Sears	Main Cast: Season 1
2018	God Friended Me	Alfie	Episode: "Matthew 621"
2018–19	Castle Rock	Reverend Appleton	Recurring Cast: Season 1-2
2019	Unbelievable	Curtis McCarthy	Recurring Cast
2020	The Right Stuff	Wally Schirra	Main Cast
2022	Partisan	Robert	Main Cast: Season 2
2022	Big Sky	Scott	Episode: "Carrion Comfort"
2023	911	Daniel Buckley	Episode: "In another life"
2023	Everyone Is Doing Great	Coach	Episode: "For Worse Or For Better"
2023–24	Based on a True Story	Simon	Recurring Cast: Season 1, Guest: Season 2

=== Video games ===
Year	Title	Role	Notes
2011	L.A. Noire	Cole Phelps	Also motion capture Nominated – British Academy Video Games Award for Performer

== Awards and nominations ==
Year	Association	Category	Nominated work	Result
2008	Gold Derby Awards	Ensemble of the Year	Mad Men	Nominated
2008	Screen Actors Guild Awards	Outstanding Performance by an Ensemble in a Drama Series	Mad Men	Nominated
2009	Screen Actors Guild Awards	Outstanding Performance by an Ensemble in a Drama Series	Mad Men	Won
2010	Gold Derby Awards	Ensemble of the Year	Mad Men	Nominated
2010	Screen Actors Guild Awards	Outstanding Performance by an Ensemble in a Drama Series	Mad Men	Won
2011	Screen Actors Guild Awards	Outstanding Performance by an Ensemble in a Drama Series	Mad Men	Nominated
2011	BAFTA Award	Performer	L.A. Noire	Nominated
2013	Screen Actors Guild Awards	Outstanding Performance by an Ensemble in a Drama Series	Mad Men	Nominated
2016	Screen Actors Guild Awards	Outstanding Performance by an Ensemble in a Drama Series	Mad Men	Nominated
