= Brooklyn Nine-Nine season 8 =

Brooklyn Nine-Nine
- Season 8
- Promotional poster
- Starring: Andy Samberg; Stephanie Beatriz; Terry Crews; Melissa Fumero; Joe Lo Truglio; Dirk Blocker; Joel McKinnon Miller; Andre Braugher
- No. of episodes: 10

Release
- Original network: NBC
- Original release: August 12 – September 16, 2021

Season chronology
- ← Previous; Season 7

The eighth and final season of the American sitcom Brooklyn Nine-Nine premiered on August 12, 2021, and concluded on September 16, 2021. The season consists of ten episodes. NBC renewed the series for an eighth season in November 2019 and announced in February 2021 that it would be the final season.

The series revolves around the lives of a group of police detectives at a fictional precinct of the New York City Police Department. It stars Andy Samberg, Stephanie Beatriz, Terry Crews, Melissa Fumero, Joe Lo Truglio, Dirk Blocker, Joel McKinnon Miller, and Andre Braugher.

== Summary ==
The precinct experiences drastic changes as a result of the COVID-19 pandemic and the George Floyd protests. Rosa quits her job and becomes a private investigator after losing faith in the system, Holt struggles to maintain his relationship with Kevin, and Hitchcock retires and keeps in touch with Scully via FaceTime. Jake and Amy attempt to keep their work lives under control during their first year as parents. In response to the increasing tension between officers and the citizens, Amy plans to implement a major reform program, which puts her in the crosshairs of old-school NYPD Union President Frank O'Sullivan. Jake is suspended for five months after making a wrongful arrest on a case he was let go from.

Holt ultimately repairs his relationship with Kevin and they renew their vows. The squad also successfully stop O'Sullivan from sabotaging the reform program proposal, leading to the commissioner implementing it citywide and appointing Holt and Amy as deputy commissioner and chief of the program, respectively. With Amy's new position making their parenting schedule more difficult, Jake decides to quit his job to be a full-time father while Terry becomes the new Captain of the precinct. The series ends with all of them deciding to continue their Halloween Heists despite their life changes.

== Cast ==
=== Main ===
- Andy Samberg as Detective Jake Peralta
- Stephanie Beatriz as Rosa Diaz
- Terry Crews as Lieutenant Terry Jeffords
- Melissa Fumero as Sergeant Amy Santiago
- Joe Lo Truglio as Detective Charles Boyle
- Dirk Blocker as Detective Michael Hitchcock
- Joel McKinnon Miller as Detective Norm Scully
- Andre Braugher as Captain Raymond Holt

=== Recurring ===
- John C. McGinley as Frank O'Sullivan
- Marc Evan Jackson as Kevin Cozner

=== Guest ===
- Chelsea Peretti as Gina Linetti
- Craig Robinson as Doug Judy
- Nicole Byer as Trudy Judy
- Christopher Gehrman as Sam Boyle
- Gregg Binkley as Lyndon Boyle
- Caleb Alexander Smith as Andrea Boyle
- Hal Alpert as Pappy Boyle
- Nicole Ghastin as Mel Boyle
- Galen Howard as Tommy Boyle
- Frederick Koehler as Becca Boyle
- Paul Witten as Todd
- Jason Mantzoukas as Adrian Pimento
- Winston Story as Bill Hummertrout
- Kyle Bornheimer as Teddy Ramos
- Tim Meadows as Caleb
- Fred Armisen as Mlepnos
- Dan Goor as Janitor Dan
- Joanna Newsom as Caroline Saint-Jacques Renard

== Episodes ==
Season 8 episodes
| No. overall | No. in season | Title | Directed by | Written by | Original release date | Prod. code | U.S. viewers (millions) |
|---|---|---|---|---|---|---|---|
| 144 | 1 | "The Good Ones" | Cortney Carrillo | David Phillips & Dewayne Perkins | August 12, 2021 | 802 | 1.84 |
Nearly a year after Rosa resigns as a detective, Jake attempts to prove to her that he is a good cop by helping her investigate a case of police brutality, only to learn more about her issues with officers and find out some disillusioning truths about the NYPD in the process. Amy returns from maternity leave and uses one of Terry's books to repair her relationship with Holt after he makes small talk, with Holt later admitting he and Kevin split up. Terry feels awkward around Charles when the latter goes overboard trying to show his support towards the African-American community.
| 145 | 2 | "The Lake House" | Kevin Bray | Neil Campbell & Marcy Jarreau | August 12, 2021 | 801 | 1.34 |
The squad takes Capt. Holt up on an offer for a weekend getaway at his "lake house". Jake messes with Capt. Holt and Kevin's shared calendar and tricks Kevin into joining them as he and Terry attempt to rekindle Kevin and Holt's relationship. Amy turns to Charles to help when she struggles to put Mac to sleep. Rosa bonds with Scully after getting high off edibles.
| 146 | 3 | "Blue Flu" | Claire Scanlon | Carol Kolb & April Quioh | August 19, 2021 | 803 | 2.02 |
99 nemesis O'Sullivan engineers a walkout of uniformed officers in response to an alleged anti-cop incident, and Holt and Amy are left to manage a short-staffed precinct. Boyle gets worrisome medical news while gathering evidence. Terry tries to gut through a bad stomach bug to help stop the Blue Flu. Ultimately, Holt uses data regarding what cops aren't doing to make O'Sullivan cave, and Amy plans to use that information for a major reform program that would change how uniformed officers are deployed.
| 147 | 4 | "Balancing" | Daniella Eisman | Evan Susser & Van Robichaux | August 19, 2021 | 804 | 1.49 |
Jake and Amy are run ragged when they try to do their jobs while also being good parents to baby Mac; Jake is trying to bring down a serial killer who's been his "white whale" and has to rely on help from Boyle, while Amy worries about her NYPD reform pitch when she finds out her main rival is a not-that-bright but very handsome cop. Elsewhere, Holt crashes at Rosa's and they end up in quite a pickle when Holt reaches out to Kevin in a way he regrets.
| 148 | 5 | "PB & J" | Gail Mancuso | Lamar Woods & Jeff Topolski | August 26, 2021 | 808 | 1.90 |
When Doug Judy is arrested for his crimes in another state, Jake agrees to transfer him to the prison so they can have one last fun time together before his incarceration. However, they end up in the ultimate game of mental chess when Jake finds out the Pontiac Bandit is planning to escape from him again but he still ends up helping him in escaping prison.
| 149 | 6 | "The Set Up" | Maggie Carey | Jess Dweck & Nick Perdue | August 26, 2021 | 805 | 1.45 |
Angered at the FBI for taking his bomb case, Jake ends up making a wrongful arrest when he investigates the site later that night. After O'Sullivan offers to drop the suspension charges against him, Jake believes he was set up so O'Sullivan can take down Amy's NYPD reform program. Amy and Rosa interrogate O'Sullivan at a bar to find out if this is true, but struggle to keep up with his high alcohol tolerance. Terry and Charles get competitive when their children start selling candy.
| 150 | 7 | "Game of Boyles" | Thembi Banks | Paul Welsh & Madeline Walter | September 2, 2021 | 806 | 1.84 |
Jake and Terry accompany Charles to the funeral of his great uncle. When viewing the uncle's body, Jake sees signs that he may have been poisoned and, bored with being on suspension, begins an investigation into all of Boyle's cousins. However, Jake's investigation only ends up proving that Charles is not a real Boyle. Meanwhile, Holt has been arguing with Kevin about how many hours he needs to cut back on work, leading Rosa and Amy to suggest Holt use a dating app to make Kevin jealous.
| 151 | 8 | "Renewal" | Beth McCarthy Miller | Stephanie A. Ritter & Beau Rawlins | September 2, 2021 | 807 | 1.31 |
Holt announces he has set up a vow renewal ceremony with Kevin and tells the detectives he will retire after he and Amy pass the police reform program. On the day of the ceremony, they find out that O'Sullivan has sabotaged their data, leading Holt and Jake to try and steal O'Sullivan's laptop computer from his mother, while Terry and Amy use O'Sullivan's Billy Joel admiration to secure his thumbprint, all while hiding from Kevin that Holt is working on the day of their vow renewal. After Kevin ends up rescuing Holt from O'Sullivan's house, he accepts that Holt is too passionate to retire and the two renew their vows before delivering the proper data to One Police Plaza. The commissioner accepts the reform proposal and plans to implement it citywide while also appointing Holt and Amy as deputy commissioner and chief of the reform program, respectively.
| 152 | 9 | "The Last Day" | Linda Mendoza | Luke Del Tredici & Audrey E. Goodman | September 16, 2021 | 809 | 1.88 |
| 153 | 10 | "The Last Day" | Claire Scanlon | Dan Goor | September 16, 2021 | 810 | 1.88 |
For Amy and Holt's last day in the precinct, Jake announces that they will have one final heist for a decoy Medal of Valor, where he plans to reveal that he is quitting his job to become a stay-at-home father. The heist is set up to be a trip down memory lane covering the squad's endeavors for the last eight years with several returning faces contributing to it, including Gina. At the same time, Terry is applying to become the new Captain of the 99th Precinct, but the ongoing heist makes him wary about his interview. All of the squad members end up locked together when Jake's, Amy's, and Holt's plans for the "perfect goodbye" all end up clashing with each other, where Jake confesses to them that he is leaving the Nine-Nine and Holt tells Terry he's already been accepted as the new Captain. They eventually make it back to the precinct, where they find that Hitchcock has also returned and won the heist. The crew enjoys their last night together and reflect on the previous years before exiting the building. A year later, Jake, Rosa, Amy, Gina, and Holt return to keep the Halloween Heist tradition alive, joining Charles, Scully, Hitchcock, and the now Captain Jeffords at the precinct.

== Production ==
The eighth season was confirmed by NBC on November 14, 2019. On February 11, 2021, it was announced that the season would be series' last and would comprise ten episodes. In June 2020, cast member Terry Crews said four planned episodes for season eight had been aborted in the wake of the George Floyd protests, as Floyd's murder prompted the producers to reassess the direction of the season's storyline. On December 31, 2020, it was announced that production had ceased on the series due to a surge in COVID-19 cases in Los Angeles, California, where the series was filmed. Production on the season began in April 2021. Filming wrapped that June.

== Release ==
In June 2020, it was announced that the season would premiere in 2020 as a part of NBC's fall schedule. However, NBC later delayed the premiere until mid-season 2020–21. On February 11, 2021, it was announced that the season had been pushed back until the 2021–22 television season. However, on May 14, 2021, it was announced that the season would air during the 2020–21 television season after the 2020 Summer Olympics. On May 20, 2021, it was announced that the season would premiere on August 12, 2021, and would consist of back-to-back episodes on Thursdays at 8 p.m. ET.

== Reception ==
=== Critical response ===
The last season received acclaim from critics, although a mixed response from audiences, who found it inferior to the first seven seasons and criticized the formulaic nature of some episodes. The series finale, however, received critical acclaim.

On the review aggregator website Rotten Tomatoes, 89% of 28 critics' reviews are positive, with an average rating of 7.8/10. The website's consensus reads: "Brooklyn Nine-Nine faces big topics with poise in a fittingly complicated final season that attempts to meet the moment without losing its sense of humor."

=== Ratings ===
Viewership and ratings per episode of Brooklyn Nine-Nine season 8
| No. | Title | Air date | Rating (18–49) | Viewers (millions) | DVR (18–49) | DVR viewers (millions) | Total (18–49) | Total viewers (millions) |
|---|---|---|---|---|---|---|---|---|
| 1 | "The Good Ones" | August 12, 2021 | 0.4 | 1.84 | 0.2 | 0.56 | 0.6 | 2.41 |
| 2 | "The Lake House" | August 12, 2021 | 0.3 | 1.34 | 0.2 | 0.55 | 0.5 | 1.90 |
| 3 | "Blue Flu" | August 19, 2021 | 0.4 | 2.02 | 0.2 | 0.55 | 0.6 | 2.57 |
| 4 | "Balancing" | August 19, 2021 | 0.3 | 1.49 | 0.2 | 0.57 | 0.5 | 2.05 |
| 5 | "PB & J" | August 26, 2021 | 0.4 | 1.90 | TBD | TBD | TBD | TBD |
| 6 | "The Setup" | August 26, 2021 | 0.3 | 1.45 | TBD | TBD | TBD | TBD |
| 7 | "Game of Boyles" | September 2, 2021 | 0.4 | 1.84 | TBD | TBD | TBD | TBD |
| 8 | "Renewal" | September 2, 2021 | 0.3 | 1.32 | TBD | TBD | TBD | TBD |
| 9 | "The Last Day Part 1" | September 16, 2021 | 0.4 | 1.88 | TBD | TBD | TBD | TBD |
| 10 | "The Last Day Part 2" | September 16, 2021 | 0.4 | 1.88 | TBD | TBD | TBD | TBD |
