= The Last Day (Brooklyn Nine-Nine) =

- Brooklyn Nine-Nine episodes
- Episode nos.: Season 8 Episodes 9–10
- Directed by: Linda Mendoza (Pt. 1); Claire Scanlon (Pt. 2)
- Written by: Luke Del Tredici & Audrey E. Goodman (Pt. 1); Dan Goor (Pt. 2)
- Cinematography by: Rick Page
- Editing by: Ryan Neatha Johnson (Pt. 1); Jason Gill (Pt. 2)
- Production code: 809–810
- Original air date: September 16, 2021
- Running time: 46 minutes

Guest appearances
- Pt. 1: Chelsea Peretti as Gina Linetti; Jason Mantzoukas as Adrian Pimento; Tim Meadows as Caleb John Gosche; Winston Story as Bill Hummertrout; Dan Goor as Janitor; Jim Meskimen as Deputy Chief Williams; Madeline Walter as Tiffany; Pt. 2: Chelsea Peretti as Gina Linetti; Kyle Bornheimer as Teddy Wells; Gabe Liedman as Dr. Oliver Cox; Joanna Newsom as Caroline Saint-Jacques Renard; Winston Story as Bill Hummertrout; Fred Armisen as Mlepnos; Dan Goor as Janitor; Eugene Kim as Dr. Midj; Andy Rocco Kraft as Detective Yorkin; Jim Meskimen as Deputy Chief Williams

Episode chronology
← Previous "Renewal"	Next → —
- Brooklyn Nine-Nine season 8

"The Last Day" is the two-part series finale of the American police sitcom television series Brooklyn Nine-Nine. It is the ninth and tenth episode of the eighth season and the 152nd and 153rd episode overall. The first part was written by Luke Del Tredici and Audrey Goodman and directed by Linda Mendoza, while the second part was written by series co-creator Dan Goor and directed by Claire Scanlon. The episodes aired on September 16, 2021 on NBC.

The show revolves around the fictitious 99th precinct of the New York Police Department in Brooklyn and the officers and detectives that work in the precinct. In the finale, the precinct braces for a last "heist" before Holt and Amy leave the precinct. Jake also plans to reveal his plan: he is going to leave the precinct and wants to prepare for the "perfect goodbye".

According to Nielsen Media Research, the episode was seen by an estimated 1.88 million household viewers and gained a 0.4 ratings share among adults aged 18–49. The series finale received positive reviews from critics and audiences, with many praising the callbacks and character development and deeming the episode to be a satisfying conclusion to the series.

== Plot ==
=== Part 1 ===
Jake (Andy Samberg) organizes a last "heist" before Holt (Andre Braugher) and Amy (Melissa Fumero) leave the precinct for their new roles as deputy commissioner and chief of the reform program. They decide to forget all previous heist winners and only the new winner will count and be crowned as "The Grand Champion of the Nine-Nine". Terry (Terry Crews) says he will not participate, as he has an interview for the precinct's Captain position.

Jake orchestrates the team selection so that Holt is partnered with Hitchcock (Dirk Blocker) and Scully (Joel McKinnon Miller), Rosa (Stephanie Beatriz) is partnered with Amy, and Jake is partnered with Charles (Joe Lo Truglio). The target of the heist is a replica of Holt's Medal of Valor, which will be stored in a pneumatic tube. Jake reveals to Amy that the intent of the heist is for him to announce he will quit his job to become a stay-at-home father, so that Amy can focus on her new job.

The heist involves the teams getting clues that lead them to past locations and people they were with during the last eight years. These include visiting Caleb (Tim Meadows), Wuntch's grave and a clue involving the time Jake made suspects sing. However, the next clue is ruined when the janitor (Dan Goor) erases the text from the interrogation room before they can see it. They call Terry to ask him for the clue and he reluctantly reveals the clue in the middle of his interview, embarrassing him in front of Deputy Chief Williams (Jim Meskimen). They then head out to the location where Holt and Kevin kissed when they reconciled. Holt manages to distract the squad by revealing his tattoo: Kevin's head on Cheddar's body. He gets to the case containing the tube but they find it empty. Gina (Chelsea Peretti) suddenly appears holding the tube.

Gina takes the tube with her on an armored truck and leaves the scene. The teams eventually hijack the truck but their attempts at getting the tube result in many of the squad members turning against each other. Meanwhile, Terry discovers that the office his interview is in is fake and, convinced that he is part of the heist, destroys the office. He confronts Holt, who tells him the interview was not fake and the office's design was a result of relocating for the new reform. Holt temporarily leaves the heist to help Terry fix the situation. As Jake's team gets the advantage, he is confronted by Charles, who found Jake's letter of resignation in his locker, and angrily storms out.

=== Part 2 ===
Jake tries to find Charles, who is not answering his phone. Meanwhile, Terry and Holt visit Williams to ask for another chance for Terry to become Captain. However, Williams reveals that he is actually part of the heist and locks them in the office.

Rosa expresses her concerns to Amy about Adrian Pimento (Jason Mantzoukas), as he is heading back to Canada and thinks she still has feelings for him. Jake locates Charles at an abandoned house where they both deemed each other best friends nine years ago and explains his decision to leave. He reconciles with Charles by telling him they will still be friends even after he leaves. They then work on setting up fireworks for the final step. However, the fireworks accidentally set themselves off and Jake fails to turn them down as the timer hits zero.

Jake seemingly wakes up in the hospital and is told by Amy that he has been in a coma for seven years. She tells him Boyle survived the incident and moved to Arizona out of guilt, where he became a Sheriff, and that she is back in a relationship with her ex-boyfriend Teddy (Kyle Bornheimer) to help her raise Mac. However, it was all a setup to get Jake to reveal the location of the real tube, as she put Jake's resignation letter in his locker, set up a fake hospital room in the precinct, and controlled the fireworks in the closet. The fireworks never blew up, as Amy just sedated Jake and Charles. She leaves Jake handcuffed to his bed and Charles locked in the supply closet as she tells Teddy she is throwing a goodbye party for Jake at Shaw's.

Holt and Terry manage to escape from the fake office by using a short circuit. Mlepnos (Fred Armisen) helps Jake and Charles escape and they confront Amy, but they find out that the tube is not where it was planned to be and that it is moving somewhere. As they go in their car to find it, Scully joins them and Charles reveals to Jake the plan that Amy had for his perfect goodbye. They drive to the location of the tube, followed by Holt and Terry. They arrive at the site: the storage facility from the first case the squad had with Holt when he became Captain. Holt then reveals that he orchestrated it, as he planned his own "perfect goodbye". He reveals that Terry got the promotion to Captain several weeks ago and the interview was a set up.

However, Holt finds out that he is carrying Jake's gift tubes. Rosa and Gina show up and are revealed to be holding tubes, having tricked Amy into thinking Rosa was going to leave with Pimento, only to discover that they have Holt and Amy's gift tubes. Bill (Winston Story) is revealed to have the real tube and locks them in the storage unit, as the heists are his only source of income. During this, Jake accidentally reveals that he is leaving the NYPD. Terry encourages the group to work together and helps them escape by crashing through the wall. They discover that Bill has fled to the precinct with the tube.

At the precinct, the squad is shocked to discover Hitchcock with the real tube. Hitchcock reveals he never retired or went to Brazil. He also states that he never had a complex plan for the heist and just bought the tube for $40 from Bill. Jake then unceremoniously crowns Hitchcock as "The Grand Champion of the Nine-Nine" and tells the squad he planned the heist as his goodbye. The crew enjoys their last night together and reflects on the previous years. Rosa tells Amy she does not plan to settle down anytime soon and wishes her luck with her new position. While Hitchcock and Scully reunite, Terry tells Charles he will be relying on him as they are the only ones staying at the precinct. Holt reflects on Jake's growth throughout the years and says that if he had a son like Jake, he would feel very proud of him. Everyone then leaves the precinct together in the elevator with Jake taking his nameplate with him.

Over a year later, the now-Captain Terry addresses his bullpen on Halloween, which includes Charles, Hitchcock, Scully, and several new faces. Jake, Amy, Holt, Rosa, and Gina suddenly appear, wanting to continue with the Halloween Heist tradition as an annual reunion. Terry considers this for a moment before proclaiming, "Nine-Nine!", followed by the rest of the squad.

== Production ==
=== Development ===
The eighth season was confirmed by NBC on November 14, 2019. On February 11, 2021, it was announced that the season would be the series' last and would comprise ten episodes. Lisa Katz, President of Scripted Content, NBCUniversal Television and Streaming, said "I still remember the palpable excitement that night in 2018 when we announced Brooklyn Nine-Nine would be returning to its rightful home at NBC. We've always loved these characters and the way they make us laugh while also masterfully weaving in storylines that make us reflect as well. A big thank you to our wonderful partners – Dan Goor, the writers, producers and the incredibly talented cast and crew – for a comedy whose legacy will stand the test of time." Series co-creator Dan Goor said, "I'm so thankful to NBC and Universal Television for allowing us to give these characters and our fans the ending they deserve. When Mike Schur and I first pitched the pilot episode to Andy, he said, 'I'm in, but I think the only way to tell this story is over exactly 153 episodes', which was crazy because that was exactly the number Mike and I had envisioned." He further added, "ending the show was a difficult decision, but ultimately, we felt it was the best way to honor the characters, the story and our viewers. I know some people will be disappointed it's ending so soon, but honestly, I'm grateful it lasted this long. Title of my sex tape."

In August 2021, it was announced that the ninth and tenth episodes of the season would be titled "The Last Day" and that Luke Del Tredici and Audrey Goodman would serve as writers while Linda Mendoza would direct the first part. Series co-creator Dan Goor would serve as writer while Claire Scanlon would direct the second part.

=== Filming ===
Filming on the episodes ended in June 2021. According to Melissa Fumero, it was a very "emotional" last day, which involved the cast hugging and celebrating the success of the series.

== Release ==
The episodes aired in the United States on September 16, 2021, on NBC. Multiple members of the cast appeared on the episode of Late Night with Seth Meyers airing the night of the episodes' release. In the United Kingdom, Channel 4's digital network E4 showed the last two episodes back-to-back on June 8, 2022 alongside a documentary called Goodbye Brooklyn Nine Nine. Commissioned from Wise Owl Films, this one-off special included behind-the-scenes footage along with interviews with the cast and British & Irish comedians such as Nish Kumar and Catherine Bohart.

== Reception ==
=== Viewers ===
According to Nielsen Media Research, the episode was seen by an estimated 1.88 million household viewers and gained a 0.4 ratings share among adults aged 18–49. This means that 0.4 percent of all households with televisions watched the episode. This was a 43% increase over the previous episode, which was watched by 1.31 million viewers and a 0.3 ratings share. With these ratings, Brooklyn Nine-Nine was the highest rated show on NBC for the night, second on its timeslot and second for the night, behind Big Brother on CBS.

=== Critical reviews ===
"The Last Day" received very positive reviews from critics. Vikram Murthi of The A.V. Club gave the episode a "B+" rating, writing, "'The Last Day' is far from Brooklyn Nine-Nine's finest hour, but it deserves credit for checking off every series finale box while telling a fun story without going overboard on saccharine material. It runs through the series' greatest hits while reuniting the original core ensemble and bringing back numerous guest stars without any of it feeling too labored. It also succeeds in being pretty funny and decently affecting, which is tough for any sitcom running out its eighth year. Most importantly, though, it delivers on expectations while having a sense of humor about those expectations. It's the equivalent of someone dutifully following through on tradition as they smirk about the silliness of the tradition itself."

Alan Sepinwall from Rolling Stone would later put the episode on his "Top 10 Episodes of 2021" list, writing, "The cop comedy spent much of its final season grappling with policework in a post-George Floyd world, with mixed results. The hour-long series finale left those messy questions behind for one more heist story, this one revisiting significant characters like Chelsea Peretti's Gina (and not-so-significant characters like Fred Armisen's Mlepnos) and events from throughout the series. 'The Last Day' underlined that what made Nine-Nine special wasn't the cop stories, but the characters and the silliness they got up to every week."

Brian Tallerico of Vulture gave the episode a 4 star rating out of 5 and wrote, "The final season of Brooklyn Nine-Nine was rocky, but it was worth the show coming back to say goodbye for this episode alone, a reminder of how funny and quick this comedy was at its best. I’ll miss it."

Tara Ariano of Vanity Fair wrote, "The true marvel of this short final season is that, despite the way it — belatedly, perhaps — faced down the complexities that underlay the workplace at its center, Brooklyn Nine-Nine still delivered the same kinds of good, hard laughs as always. The finale also made me cry a little bit. To create this kind of work requires, on both sides of the camera, a strong and nimble staff. (Title of your sex tape.)" Nick Harley of Den of Geek gave the episode a 4.5 star rating out of 5 and wrote, "Season 8 of Brooklyn Nine-Nine wasn't the triumphant victory lap that it should have been, but 'The Last Day' absolutely sends off our favorite precinct with grace, humor, and heart. 'Silly cops' is how Bill Hader once dismissively ripped on Andy Samberg at a Comedy Central Roast, and in today's climate, it's probably never felt more biting, but Brooklyn Nine-Nine was always something more. The series was rarely ever less than a feel-good ensemble that made you think, made you laugh, and made you start dropping 'Cool cool cool' into daily conversation. It will be missed, but it went out beautifully. NINE-NINE!"
