= Wedding Crashers =

2005 film by David Dobkin

- Theatrical release poster
- Directed by: David Dobkin
- Written by: Steve Faber; Bob Fisher
- Produced by: Peter Abrams; Robert L. Levy; Andrew Panay
- Starring: Owen Wilson; Vince Vaughn; Christopher Walken; Rachel McAdams; Isla Fisher; Jane Seymour
- Cinematography: Julio Macat
- Edited by: Mark Livolsi
- Music by: Rolfe Kent
- Production company: Tapestry Films
- Distributed by: New Line Cinema
- Release date: July 15, 2005
- Running time: 119 minutes
- Country: United States
- Language: English
- Budget: $40 million
- Box office: $288.5 million

Wedding Crashers is a 2005 American romantic comedy film directed by David Dobkin, written by Steve Faber and Bob Fisher, starring Owen Wilson, Vince Vaughn, Rachel McAdams and Isla Fisher with Christopher Walken, Bradley Cooper and Jane Seymour in supporting roles. The film follows two divorce mediators (Wilson and Vaughn) who crash weddings in an attempt to meet and seduce women. When they crash the wedding of the U.S. Treasury Secretary's daughter, they are unexpectedly invited to the family's home, where a weekend of farcical events changes their perspectives on love and marriage.

The film opened on July 15, 2005, through New Line Cinema to critical and commercial success, grossing $288.5 million worldwide on a $40 million budget. It was the 6th highest grossing film of 2005 in the United States and became the first R-rated comedy to make $200 million at the domestic box office. The success of the film has been credited with helping to revive the popularity of adult-oriented, R-rated comedies.

== Plot ==
Best friends John Beckwith and Jeremy Grey are divorce mediators in Washington, D.C. who, in their spare time, crash weddings under false identities to meet and have sex with women. At the end of a season of successful crashes, Jeremy convinces John to crash the wedding of the eldest daughter of the U.S. Treasury Secretary, William Cleary. At the nuptials, the pair set their sights on Cleary's other daughters, Gloria and Claire. During the reception, Jeremy has sex with Gloria on a nearby beach; she tells him afterward that she was a virgin. Possessive and infatuated, Gloria tells Jeremy that she loves him. Meanwhile, John becomes smitten with Claire, the maid of honor, but is interrupted by her hotheaded boyfriend, Sack Lodge, who is unfaithful and disrespectful behind her back. Gloria invites John and Jeremy to an extended weekend retreat at their family compound in Maryland. Jeremy is anxious to escape from Gloria, but John overrules him and accepts in an effort to get closer to Claire.

John and Jeremy become acquainted with the Clearys. The Secretary's wife Kathleen comes on to John sexually while Gloria's brother Todd tries to seduce Jeremy during the night. Gloria continues to lavish sexual attention on Jeremy, massaging his penis at dinner and later tying his wrists and ankles to a bedframe and raping him. Sack also repeatedly injures Jeremy during a game of touch football. At dinner, John spikes Sack's wine with eye drops to make him sick and get more time to connect with Claire.

John and Claire continue to bond the next day during a sailing trip. The suspicious Sack takes John and Jeremy on a hunting trip and pranks them, shooting Jeremy in the buttocks. While Jeremy recovers, John and Claire go on a bike ride to a secluded beach. Claire finally admits she is not sure how she feels about Sack and kisses John passionately. Back at the Clearys' estate, Gloria tends to Jeremy's wounds and reveals to him that she lied about being a virgin. Jeremy realizes that he may be in love with Gloria. Later in the afternoon, Sack announces that he and Claire are getting married. Jeremy prompts John to forsake his pursuit of Claire so they can go home, but John refuses, stating that he is in love with her. While John is confessing his feelings to Claire, they are interrupted by Jeremy being chased out of the house at gunpoint. Sack, who has been investigating them, reveals John and Jeremy's real identities to the family. Disappointed, the Secretary tells them to leave.

Over the following months, John attempts to reach Claire, but she refuses to see him. Expecting Jeremy to aid him, he attempts to sneak into Claire and Sack's engagement party, but is caught and beaten by Sack. Confronting Jeremy about abandoning him, John learns that Jeremy has secretly continued his relationship with Gloria. Feeling betrayed and brokenhearted, John spirals into depression, crashes weddings alone, and becomes nihilistic and suicidal. As Sack and a reticent Claire plan their wedding, Jeremy proposes to Gloria and tries to ask John to be his best man, but John turns him away.

John visits Jeremy's former wedding-crashing mentor, Chazz Reinhold. Chazz, who lives with his mother as a middle-aged man, convinces John to crash a funeral with him. At the funeral, John reconsiders his belief in love and marriage after seeing the grieving widow. John rushes to Jeremy's wedding and joins them mid-ceremony. Claire is upset by his presence and begins to leave, prompting John to regret his past behavior and profess his love for her in front of the congregation. Sack mocks John and orders Claire to return to the altar, but she finally tells him that she can not marry him. After the Secretary stands by his daughter and John quips about Sack's temper, Sack tries to attack John, but Jeremy intervenes and knocks him out. As Jeremy and Gloria tie the knot, John and Claire share a kiss. After the wedding, the two couples drive away from the ceremony and discuss crashing another wedding together.

== Cast ==
- Owen Wilson as John Beckwith, Jeremy's fellow wedding crasher and womanizer who falls in love with Claire
- Vince Vaughn as Jeremy Grey, John's fellow wedding crasher and womanizer who becomes attached to Gloria
- Rachel McAdams as Claire Cleary, William and Kathleen's daughter and John's love interest
- Isla Fisher as Gloria Cleary, William and Kathleen's daughter, Claire's sister and Jeremy's love interest
- Christopher Walken as U.S. Secretary of the Treasury William Cleary
- Jane Seymour as Kathleen Cleary, William's wife
- Bradley Cooper as Sack Lodge, Claire's verbally abusive boyfriend and John's rival
- Ellen Albertini Dow as "Grandma" Mary Cleary, William's mother
- Keir O'Donnell as Todd Cleary, William and Kathleen's artistic yet brooding son
- Henry Gibson as Father O'Neil
- Ron Canada as Randolph
- Rebecca De Mornay as Mrs. Kroeger
- Dwight Yoakam as Mr. Kroeger
- Jenny Alden as Christina Cleary, William and Kathleen's daughter
- Will Ferrell as Chazz Reinhold (uncredited), a wedding and funeral crasher who mentored Jeremy

Arizona Senator and 2008 Republican presidential nominee John McCain and Democratic strategist and CNN contributor James Carville make a brief cameo appearance, when they are shown congratulating the secretary and his wife on their daughter's wedding.

== Production ==
Andrew Panay, co-producer of Wedding Crashers, had the idea for the film based on his own experiences of being excited to attend weddings in his 20s due to the prospect of meeting women. Panay then consulted the screenwriting team of Steve Faber and Bob Fisher to come up with a story based on this premise. Much of the film was based upon Fisher's experiences as a college intern in Washington, D.C., where he would make up fake backstories to crash lobbyist events for the free food. Panay and Fisher's experiences merged together to form the idea of a film in which the main characters crash weddings to meet and sleep with women.

The screenwriters had doubts that the premise could be sustained into a feature-length film, so they decided to add female love interests born from a political family, inspired by their dream of marrying a girl from the Kennedy family when they were young boys. It was also Panay's desire "to explore male friendship through this crazy idea of crashing weddings" as the emotional core of the movie. In preparation for the film, the creators would crash political party platform committee meetings in order to delve into the psyche of the characters and what it means to crash a party.

On April 6, 2003, Variety reported that both Faber and Fisher had struck a "mid-six figures" deal with New Line Cinema to acquire the pitch for the film. David Dobkin signed to direct in 2004, seeing it as an opportunity to pair Vince Vaughn and Owen Wilson, who had previously worked with Dobkin and gave him an Abbott and Costello impression when they were at the premiere of his film Shanghai Knights.

According to Dobkin, the marketing department at New Line Cinema raised some concerns regarding the protagonists of the film, who were seen as misogynists whose goal is to seduce women at weddings and have sex with them. Dobkin saw these characters in a different light, however, convincing the department:

They love weddings, authentically. They like the free food, they like the music and the bands, they like the dancing and the kids, they like talking to the grandparents. These guys make the weddings better. You would want them to crash your wedding.

That's the distinction. It's not misogynistic and, in fact, what it's doing is replicating a real seduction, which is, "I want to go to bed with you, but I have all these walls up. Can you make me laugh, make me attracted to you and find a way to make this really fun so we could get to the good part?" That's a seduction. So, if I can seduce the audience — if I can make them laugh and be entertained and think these are okay guys — by the time they're dropping the girls in the bed, it's a magic trick. That was the whole idea.

Vaughn and Wilson were the first actors cast in the film. Dobkin cast Bradley Cooper without even watching his audition tape as he was so impressed by Cooper's test reading. Isla Fisher, then a relatively unknown actress in the United States (but had a significant profile in the United Kingdom and Australia on account of her work in the soap opera Home and Away) was cast as Gloria over Shannon Elizabeth and Anna Paquin. The casting of Secretary Cleary was a contentious issue between Dobkin and the studio executives, with Dobkin wanting to cast Christopher Walken, but New Line Cinema wanted a more comedic actor such as Burt Reynolds instead of Walken, who was viewed more as a serious character actor. Nicolas Cage was considered for the role of Chazz Reinhold, before Will Ferrell was cast. The role of Claire was the final role to be cast, with Dobkin auditioning over 200 actresses before casting Rachel McAdams.

Dobkin originally considered the possibility of releasing a version of the film that was not R-rated to broaden the film's commercial appeal, but the idea was abandoned after a consultant provided a long list of the many R-rated elements in the film, and Dobkin realized "The two funniest scenes in the movie would have had to go." Despite this, New Line Cinema still did not want the film to be rated R, but they eventually conceded to keep the R rating after pressure from Dobkin.

Dobkin has said that the script originally set the film around Cape Cod, but a need to film in spring made this impractical. He suggested moving the shoot to Washington, D.C., his home town, feeling that his knowledge of the area would make choosing locations easier, and that using the city as the setting for a comedy would be an unexpected choice.

=== Filming ===
Dobkin insisted on three and a half weeks of rehearsals before filming began, based on his background working in theater. Principal photography began on March 22, 2004, in Washington, D.C. The film had a 52-day shooting schedule.

The main Cleary wedding reception scene was filmed at the Inn at Perry Cabin in Saint Michaels, Maryland. The Ellenborough Estate in Easton, Maryland is the setting of the Cleary family house, where a majority of the movie takes place.

Director David Dobkin said Owen Wilson was nervous about the scene where Wilson grabs Jane Seymour's breast. "He didn't really want to squeeze her breast when she was telling him to. And I was like, 'Dude, you gotta do it, it doesn't look right, your hands look like crab claws.' And then he did it eventually and that scene ended up being way funnier than I thought it was going to be," Dobkin said.

The family dinner scene has been cited by Keir O'Donnell as the most grueling scene to film with Vaughn stating that the cast and crew were unsure if the scene would work on-screen in the way in which it was intended. To shoot the scene in which the family plays football, Dobkin—an avid fan of the NFL—shot the scene in the manner in which a television crew broadcasts an NFL game in order to make the scene seem authentic and familiar to the audience.

Throughout the filming, the producers encouraged improvisation from the cast, specifically from Wilson and Vaughn, leaving breaks in the script for the cast to improvise. In one scene, Vaughn improvises for over 25 seconds straight.

== Release ==
=== Box office ===
The film was released in North America on July 15, 2005, and became an immediate hit, grossing $33,900,720 in its first weekend, opening at #2 in the box office, behind Charlie and the Chocolate Factory. Exit polling indicated that 60% of audiences were over 25 years old, and almost evenly split between men and women.

Considering its higher-than-expected budget of $40 million, competition with heavily advertised blockbusters during the summer season, and the film's R-rating limiting its potential audience, the studio did not expect the movie's level of success, making it a sleeper hit. New Line head of distribution, David Tuckerman said "We would have been happy with $25 million this weekend."

The film would prove fruitful, reaching #1 at the box office in its third week and eventually grossing over $209,255,921 domestically, making it the 6th highest-grossing domestic film of 2005 and the first R-rated comedy to earn over 200 million dollars at the U.S. box office. It grossed $75,920,820 in other territories, totaling $285,176,741 worldwide.

The financial success of the film has been credited along with The 40-Year-Old Virgin for reviving the popularity of adult-aimed R-rated comedies.

=== Critical response ===
On Rotten Tomatoes, Wedding Crashers has an approval rating of 75% based on 185 reviews, with an average rating of 6.6/10. The website's critical consensus states, "Wedding Crashers is both raunchy and sweet, and features top-notch comic performances from Vince Vaughn and Owen Wilson." On Metacritic, the film has a score of 64 out of 100 based on reviews from 39 critics, indicating "generally favorable reviews". Audiences surveyed by CinemaScore gave the film a grade A−.

Carina Chocano of the Los Angeles Times wrote a favorable review, and in particular praised Vaughn's performance: "Jeremy is the soul of the movie. There's something about Vaughn—the deadpan eyes; the sublimated, misdirected intelligence—that recalls Bill Murray in his 'Caddyshack' years." Chocano was critical of Will Ferrell's "hyper-active bonehead routine" and called the interlude awful. She added that the film was "really just a love story about a couple of buddies who live happily ever after. And it couldn't have happened to a nicer, more charming couple".

Brian Lowry of Variety described the film as "fairly amusing, fitfully over the top and [...] occasionally a touch homophobic". He praised McAdams as she manages to "fill in narrative gaps and actually creates a real character", said Vaughan's dialog had most of the comedic highlights, and wrote that Walken was underused. Lowry concluded, "While neither a full-throated R-rated romp a la There's Something About Mary nor a fully realized romantic comedy, Wedding Crashers contains enough appealing elements of both to catch the bouquet in what's been a relatively humor-deprived summer".

Joe Morgenstern of The Wall Street Journal called the film "the best comedy of 2005" while Entertainment Weekly's Lisa Schwarzbaum described the film as "an unabashedly jiggly, bawdy, it’s-all-good comedy. Manohla Dargis of The New York Times wrote, "It's crude, yes, but also funny; too bad these lost boys can't stay lost. Like clockwork, the film soon mutates from a guy-oriented sex comedy into a wish-fulfillment chick flick". Roger Ebert of the Chicago Sun-Times gave the film two stars out of four; although he wrote that "there are individual moments that are very funny", he added that the director, David Dobkin, "has too much else on his mind".

British film magazine Empire awarded it three out of five stars and were complimentary to Vaughn and Wilson, saying "Sharing an easy chemistry and free of the usual joker/straight-guy dynamic, Wilson and Vaughn quip, riff and banter to hilarious effect. And both get their fair share of money moments, the latter's muggings are particularly hysterical in a raunchy dinner-party sequence. The laidback stars are funny and sweet, but they're let down by a patchy script which squanders some potentially priceless set-ups."

Kimberley Jones of The Austin Chronicle opined that the film "will no doubt make buckets of money, but it'll do so without half the wit, compassion, or inspired madness" that There's Something About Mary had. Jones complained that the plot was "mostly cookie-cutter stuff", and was offended by the portrayal of minorities, writing "gays and blacks are represented, respectively, by a squirrelly psychotic and a Jamaican house servant". Jones concluded, "A stiff drink or maybe some pharmaceutical assistance might have made me overlook the film's sour tone or the unremarkableness of its direction."

In 2018, Scott Meslow of GQ reassessed the film after initially liking it upon its release. He wrote, "Even beyond the gender and sexual dynamics that have aged rather poorly, Wedding Crashers feels awfully uneven today." He noted a date-rape joke in the opening minutes, and also identified the use of the sassy racist grandmother trope. In addition, he called the predatory gay man trope "inexcusably unfunny" and felt that the film trivializes rape. Lastly, he opined that the female characters were underdeveloped and called Will Ferrell's cameo lazy. However, Meslow added that "For all its faults, [the film] does have an extremely strong pair of leads".

=== Accolades ===
On April 24, 2006, Wedding Crashers topped the nominations for the year's MTV Movie Awards with five including Best Movie. It won Best Movie, On-Screen Team (Vaughn and Wilson), and Breakthrough Performance (Isla Fisher).

=== Home media ===
Wedding Crashers was released on DVD in the United States on January 3, 2006, by New Line Home Entertainment, and a Blu-ray was released on December 30, 2008. It is available in an unrated version ("Uncorked Edition") and in an R-rated version (the Blu-ray has both versions on one disc). It features eight new minutes integrated into the film and DVD-ROM bonuses. Also included are two audio commentaries (one by the stars, one by the director), four deleted scenes, two featurettes, a "Rules of Wedding Crashing" text gallery, trailers, Budweiser Wedding Crashers commercials, a track listing for the official soundtrack on 20th Century Fox Records, a music video by The Sights, and a jump-to-a-song sample feature. The film earned an estimated $145 million from home media sales.

== Legacy ==
In 2015, Entertainment Weekly named the film as the 21st most quotable comedy film since 1970. The phrase "stage-five clinger", invented for the film by co-writer Steve Faber, has entered the popular lexicon – it describes a person who figuratively latches on to another person in an undesirable way.

David Dobkin later directed the music video for Maroon 5's 2015 single "Sugar", depicting the band crashing real-life weddings, inspired by Wedding Crashers.

== Television version ==
The creators of the film made a reality TV prank show spinoff, called The Real Wedding Crashers, which aired NBC in April and May 2007. The series lasted only 6 episodes before being canceled by NBC.

== Potential sequel ==
In a 2014 post on the website Quora, Wedding Crashers director David Dobkin said that he, Vaughn, and Wilson once came up with an idea for a sequel in which John and Jeremy find themselves competing with a superior wedding crasher, played by Daniel Craig; but this idea never went beyond the discussion phase.

In a November 2016 interview, Fisher stated that Vaughn had told her that there were ongoing talks about a sequel. New Line Cinema hired Fist Fight screenwriting duo Van Robichaux and Evan Susser to write the script. As of 2022, plans for a potential sequel were delayed indefinitely following developmental and scheduling issues.
