= Trying (Brooklyn Nine-Nine) =

- Brooklyn Nine-Nine episode
- Episode no.: Season 7 Episode 6
- Directed by: Kim Nguyen
- Written by: Evan Susser & Van Robichaux
- Cinematography by: Rick Page
- Editing by: Ryan Neatha Johnson
- Production code: 706
- Original air date: March 5, 2020
- Running time: 21 minutes

Guest appearances
- Neil Campbell as Larry Britches; Anna Bogomazova as Anna Rubov; Irina Davidoff as Russian Lady; Irina Dubova as Magda Rubov; M.J. George as Ramon Calla Vega

Episode chronology
← Previous "Debbie"	Next → "Ding Dong"
- Brooklyn Nine-Nine season 7

"Trying" is the 6th episode of the seventh season of the American television police sitcom series Brooklyn Nine-Nine, and the 136th overall episode of the series. The episode was written by Evan Susser and Van Robichaux and directed by Kim Nguyen. It aired on March 5, 2020, on NBC.

The show revolves around the fictitious 99th precinct of the New York Police Department in Brooklyn and the officers and detectives that work in the precinct. In this episode, Jake and Amy grow desperate in their attempt to have children and resort to different methods to get Amy pregnant. Meanwhile, Holt tries to convince Terry to put him on a different beat. Boyle and Rosa secretly raise a continuously growing family of guinea pigs in the precinct and Hitchcock quickly finds love after his last divorce.

According to Nielsen Media Research, the episode was seen by an estimated 1.82 million household viewers and gained a 0.6 ratings share among adults aged 18–49. The episode received mixed-to-positive reviews from critics, while critics praised the message of the episode, others felt that it had no character development and the subplots received criticism.

== Plot ==
In the cold open, the squad attends Hitchcock's latest "divorce party". Though upset about it, Hitchcock quickly moves on from it when he spots an attractive woman at the bar.

Jake (Andy Samberg) and Amy (Melissa Fumero) are trying to have a child, but neither are fully convinced on the best way to conceive. Jake decides to raise the stakes by doing the "Jake Way". The first idea involves Jake leading Amy through clues and finding him to have sex. Despite that, Amy still fails to get pregnant. They decide to adopt the "Amy Way" where they schedule their next sex sessions and hope for the best.

Meanwhile, Holt (Andre Braugher) asks Terry (Terry Crews) to put him on a different beat, but Terry thinks being on a repetitive structure could be useful. Boyle (Joe Lo Truglio) must get rid of two guinea pigs as his son is allergic to them, and he hides them in a precinct room with the help of Rosa (Stephanie Beatriz). Before they can find a family to adopt them, they find the guinea pigs have begun multiplying. Hitchcock (Dirk Blocker) falls in love with the woman he met at the bar, but then accidentally ruins the paper containing her phone number. Using a tooth that fell out of her mouth, he and Scully (Joel McKinnon Miller) set out to track her down.

Over the course of six months, Amy's methods fail to get results and she and Jake begin to grow tired of sex. Holt eventually gets used to his beat, bonds with some of the people in the area, and learns to speak fluent Russian. Boyle and Rosa struggle to take care of the continually multiplying guinea pigs. Hitchcock eventually finds his lover, a Russian woman named Anna (Anna Bogomazova). Much to Amy's dismay and frustration, Hitchcock announces that he and Anna are expecting.

The squad is invited to their wedding at Shaw's bar. With Anna's recent pregnancy, Jake and Amy decide to try the "Hitchcock Way" which involves making every worst possible decision. After Amy drunkenly informs every attendee about Anna's pregnancy before stepping out to have sex with Jake, Anna's family begins to fight. Thanks to Holt interpreting them, the squad finds out that Anna's baby is from her sister's husband and she and Hitchcock divorce shortly afterwards. With no private areas at the bar, Amy and Jake decide to have sex at the precinct, where they stumble upon the room Boyle and Rosa were keeping the guinea pigs in.

Amy decides that she is done with trying to have a baby. Later, she and Jake talk and decide that it's just something that will come someday, even if they can't control it. They have sex and while the result is still the same, they feel more comfortable now. Holt admits to Terry that his repetitive beat has been helpful as learning Russian has allowed him to pick up some useful local information. Terry finds a lab technician that's agreed to take all the guinea pigs in the office, much to Boyle and Rosa's relief.

== Reception ==
=== Viewers ===
According to Nielsen Media Research, the episode was seen by an estimated 1.82 million household viewers and gained a 0.6 ratings share among adults aged 18–49. This means that 0.6 percent of all households with televisions watched the episode. This was a 4% increase over the previous episode, which was watched by 1.74 million viewers and a 0.5 ratings share. With these ratings, Brooklyn Nine-Nine was the highest rated show on NBC for the night, seventh on its timeslot and ninth for the night, behind Last Man Standing, A Million Little Things, Carol's Second Act, The Unicorn, Mom, Young Sheldon, Station 19, and Grey's Anatomy.

=== Critical reviews ===
"Trying" received mixed-to-positive reviews from critics. LaToya Ferguson of The A.V. Club gave the episode a "B−" rating, writing, "'Trying,' technically has six months of material to cram in – and that's the joke – but as much as the episode keeps going and going, it lacks the substantial nature that one would expect from that device."

Alan Sepinwall of Rolling Stone wrote, "Fertility troubles are a familiar issue from both life and TV, and 'Trying' doesn't shoot for any grand statement on the subject. It just allows it to be a tough problem for our heroes to deal with, suggesting potential alternatives that could be explored later, but largely focusing on the emotional hardship." Nick Harley of Den of Geek gave it a perfect 5 star rating out of 5 and wrote, "Combining the perfect mixture of sweet and absurd with some surprising story decisions, 'Trying' is easily the best Brooklyn Nine-Nine episode of the season. Hopefully we can expect to see more format-busting episodes in the back half of Season 7. An episode like 'Trying' makes me feel like Scully officiating Hitchcock's wedding, just bursting with love for this show."
