= Balancing (Brooklyn Nine-Nine) =

- Brooklyn Nine-Nine episode
- Episode no.: Season 8 Episode 4
- Directed by: Daniella Eisman
- Written by: Evan Susser & Van Robichaux
- Cinematography by: Rick Page
- Editing by: Jason Gill
- Production code: 804
- Original air date: August 19, 2021
- Running time: 21 minutes

Guest appearances
- Marc Evan Jackson as Kevin Cozner; Neil Campbell as Barry Britches; Eddie Alfano as Eric Marsh; Carter Booker as Seven-Year-Old Terry; Collin Christopher as Nerdy Man; Allie Jennings as Woman; Michael James Lazar as NYPD Official; Christopher Wolf as Austin Grant

Episode chronology
← Previous "Blue Flu"	Next → "PB & J"
- Brooklyn Nine-Nine season 8

"Balancing" is the 4th episode of the eighth season of the American television police sitcom series Brooklyn Nine-Nine, and the 147th overall episode of the series. The episode was written by Evan Susser and Van Robichaux and directed by Daniella Eisman. It aired on August 19, 2021 on NBC, airing back-to-back with the previous episode, "Blue Flu".

The show revolves around the fictitious 99th precinct of the New York Police Department in Brooklyn and the officers and detectives that work in the precinct. In this episode, Jake and Amy try to balance their job with their parent life as taking care of Mac proves to be far more difficult than it appears. To complicate matters, Jake finds that a serial killer he has been pursuing for 10 years is close to him and Amy must work to make a new police reform. Meanwhile, Holt moves in with Rosa but soon becomes a problem when he only talks about Kevin.

According to Nielsen Media Research, the episode was seen by an estimated 1.48 million household viewers and gained a 0.3 ratings share among adults aged 18–49. The episode received mixed-to-positive reviews from critics, with critics expressing criticism at its "formulaic" and "uninspired" main story.

== Plot ==
Jake (Andy Samberg) investigates a murder committed by Johnny Franzia, a serial killer he has been trying to pursue for 10 years and is deemed his "white whale". However, Holt (Andre Braugher) removes him from the case, citing that he and Amy (Melissa Fumero) may want more time taking care of Mac. Both convince Holt to retain their hours, saying they can take care of Mac and still properly work.

Their plans quickly go awry when there is a lice outbreak at Mac's daycare and without babysitters available, they are forced to have Mac at home and at work. Jake and Amy also contract lice. Jake's home remedy of covering their hair in maple syrup to suffocate the lice causes Amy's hair to become unmanageable. When they have a lead on Franzia, they leave Mac in Scully (Joel McKinnon Miller)'s care, but Scully injures himself, forcing the couple to take care of Mac themselves. Amy has an important meeting at 1 Police Plaza to pitch the new police reform idea and is stressed when she must present it earlier than planned while looking sloppy. This coincides with Jake finally discovering Franzia's identity. Jake agrees to let Boyle (Joe Lo Truglio) go after Franzia and Amy successfully pitches her reform to the police. While Boyle explains what happened, Jake is happy to see his son stand up for the first time. Later, he and Amy talk and despite both losing an important moment in their lives, they agree that working together is a better choice.

Meanwhile, after failing to progress in couples' therapy with Kevin (Marc Evan Jackson), Holt moves in with Rosa (Stephanie Beatriz). However, Rosa is annoyed when Holt only talks about Kevin and she takes him out to drink. Holt stops talking about Kevin but they find that while drunk, Holt sent an obscene picture to Kevin. They infiltrate Kevin's house to delete the message but Cheddar's barking exposes them as Kevin arrives early, but they manage to escape with an excuse that Kevin buys. Later, Rosa says that Kevin's reaction seemed sad, indicating that he misses Holt. Holt decides to talk with him by sending him the picture again and Kevin responds back with a scatter plot (his way of flirting), indicating that their relationship is stabilizing.

== Production ==
=== Development ===
In August 2021, it was announced that the fourth episode of the season would be titled "Balancing" and that Evan Susser and Van Robichaux would serve as writers while Daniella Eisman would direct.

== Reception ==
=== Viewers ===
According to Nielsen Media Research, the episode was seen by an estimated 1.48 million household viewers and gained a 0.3 ratings share among adults aged 18–49. This means that 0.3 percent of all households with televisions watched the episode. This was a 27% decrease over the previous episode, which was watched by 2.01 million viewers and a 0.4 ratings share. With these ratings, Brooklyn Nine-Nine was the highest rated show on NBC for the night, fourth on its timeslot and sixth for the night, behind a B Positive rerun, a The Neighborhood rerun, Holey Moley, Beat Shazam, and Big Brother.

=== Critical reviews ===
"Balancing" received mixed-to-positive reviews from critics. Vikram Murthi of The A.V. Club gave the episode a "B−" rating, writing, "Unfortunately, the second episode this week features a tired premise around work/life balance and 'having it all' that's been done better many times before. Jake and Amy struggle to parent their son, Mac, while maintaining the pressures of their respective careers."

Brian Tallerico of Vulture gave the episode a 3 star rating out of 5 and wrote, "An episode that highlights one of the many arguments for defunding the police is followed by a goofier, more personal episode about how Jake and Amy will balance police work with raising Mac. It's broader in tone than the most recent episodes, leaning into physical humor like hair nets full of maple syrup and dick pics, but it does center the relationship between Jake and Amy in a way that’s satisfying."

Nick Harley of Den of Geek wrote, "Similarly to last week, the night's second episode leaves a bit to be desired. 'Balancing' is a classic new parents sitcom episode filtered through the BK99 lens. This is the exact kind of story that I was not looking forward to when it was revealed that Jake and Amy would be parents. While the show was incredibly inventive telling pregnancy stories, so far, the parenting stories have been cliché."
