= Blue Flu (Brooklyn Nine-Nine) =

- Brooklyn Nine-Nine episode
- Episode no.: Season 8 Episode 3
- Directed by: Claire Scanlon
- Written by: Carol Kolb & April Quioh
- Cinematography by: Rick Page
- Editing by: Ryan Neatha Johnson
- Production code: 803
- Original air date: August 19, 2021
- Running time: 21 minutes

Guest appearances
- John C. McGinley as Frank O'Sullivan; Anthea Neri Best as News Anchor; Keisuke Hoashi as Dr. Mintleman; Tatum Shank as Officer McCaffery

Episode chronology
← Previous "The Lake House"	Next → "Balancing"
- Brooklyn Nine-Nine season 8

"Blue Flu" is the 3rd episode of the eighth season of the American television police sitcom series Brooklyn Nine-Nine, and the 146th overall episode of the series. The episode was written by co-executive producer Carol Kolb and April Quioh and directed by Claire Scanlon. It aired on August 19, 2021 on NBC, airing back-to-back with the follow-up episode, "Balancing".

The show revolves around the fictitious 99th precinct of the New York Police Department in Brooklyn and the officers and detectives that work in the precinct. In this episode, the Patrolmen's Benevolent Association engineers a walkout of uniformed officers in response to an alleged anti-cop incident, and Holt and Amy are left to manage a short-staffed precinct. During the mission, Boyle gets worrisome medical news while gathering evidence.

According to Nielsen Media Research, the episode was seen by an estimated 2.01 million household viewers and gained a 0.4 ratings share among adults aged 18–49. The episode received positive reviews from critics, who praised the cast, particularly Braugher's and Lo Truglio's performances.

== Plot ==
Patrolmen's Benevolent Association head Frank O'Sullivan (John C. McGinley) engineers a walkout of uniformed officers by claiming illness in response to an anti-cop incident involving a mouse found in a burrito. Disbelieving the officer's claim of being targeted and wanting to force the officers to return to work, Holt (Andre Braugher) orders the squad to investigate the incident.

Noticing that the officers were all diagnosed with infectious mononucleosis by the same doctor, Jake (Andy Samberg) sends Boyle (Joe Lo Truglio), who has had mono and is therefore immune, to the same doctor hoping that he will get the same diagnosis, proving that the other officers are faking. But Boyle's visit soon turns concerning when the examination reveals signs of what could be testicular cancer. Waiting for the test results leads Boyle to confess to Jake that he fears dying and missing seeing Nikolaj grow up as well as missing more adventures with Jake, which moves Jake to tears.

Meanwhile, Terry (Terry Crews) and Amy (Melissa Fumero) ask other precincts for extra personnel to help out while they are under-staffed. However, the precincts send their own "Hitchcocks and Scullys," instead of good detectives. In order to motivate them, Amy gives them pedometers, promising one week of overtime to whoever has the most steps. Terry has been struggling to work due to a stomach bug and goes home. Some officers learn that he has gone home sick and, thinking he has joined the walkout, invite him to a strategy meeting. He forces himself to attend, intending to record it.

Holt hires Rosa (Stephanie Beatriz) to investigate the mouse incident and she discovers evidence corroborating Holt's belief that the officer staged the incident himself. She gives it to Holt in exchange for a photo of Holt's tattoo, in order to collect a $2000 bounty from Jake. Holt shows the evidence to O'Sullivan but he twists Holt's argument against him and refuses to call off the Blue Flu. Terry returns from the meeting but the recording is useless since his audible gastrointestinal distress drowned out the officers talking together. To worsen the situation, Amy finds that the "Hitchcocks and Scullys" have been using massage chairs to fool their pedometers and haven't actually been walking their beats.

Boyle finally gets his results which reveal he merely has a treatable infection. He and Jake discover that the lab which did the other officers' bloodwork is responsible for the fake diagnoses. They give their evidence to O'Sullivan, who admits the officers were faking mono, but now they really are sick because Terry gave them all his stomach bug. A defeated Holt goes to the bar where Boyle gives him a talk about his fears. Holt then gets an idea. He confronts O'Sullivan at his office, revealing that with fewer officers, the 99th precinct had fewer complaints and bad arrests, while managing to prevent an increase in the crime rate. O'Sullivan is forced to admit Holt is right and he calls off the Blue Flu so Holt won't fire the officers.

Jake interrupts Holt's end-of-shift briefing, having obtained the photo of Holt's tattoo, but the squad is disappointed when it turns out to be just a decimal point. Afterward it is revealed that Rosa faked the photo for Holt after he paid her more than the bounty, but the episode ends without revealing what the tattoo really is.

== Production ==
In August 2021, it was announced that the third episode of the season would be titled "Blue Flu" and that Carol Kolb and April Quioh would serve as writers while Claire Scanlon would direct.

== Reception ==
=== Viewers ===
According to Nielsen Media Research, the episode was seen by an estimated 2.01 million household viewers and gained a 0.4 ratings share among adults aged 18–49. This means that 0.4 percent of all households with televisions watched the episode. This was a 50% increase over the previous episode, which was watched by 1.34 million viewers and a 0.3 ratings share. With these ratings, Brooklyn Nine-Nine was the highest rated show on NBC for the night, fourth on its timeslot and fourth for the night, behind Holey Moley, Beat Shazam, and Big Brother.

=== Critical reviews ===
"Blue Flu" received positive reviews from critics. Vikram Murthi of The A.V. Club gave the episode a "B+" rating, writing, "There was no possible way for Brooklyn Nine-Nine to please everybody, and thankfully it doesn't really try. But after the relatively exposition- and speech-heavy premiere that tried to do too much in the way of lip service and hedging, 'Blue Flu' features a premise that integrates Brooklyn Nine-Nine's political consciousness into a novel episodic premise that's funny and compelling. It's a good example of a show adjusting to The Times without getting bogged down in defensive anxiety."

Brian Tallerico of Vulture gave the episode a 3 star rating out of 5 and wrote, "The creative team behind Brooklyn Nine-Nine has trotted out the same formula as the show's premiere week for its sophomore double feature, once again chaining an episode that tackles real-world concerns with one more centered on the personal lives of the members of the Nine-Nine. The result is a pair of episodes that kind of feel like an echo of last week rather than pushing forward any sort of season momentum. They both contain enough moments of humor and insight to work reasonably well on their own terms, but they're also both in the shadow of superior outings from just a week ago. Let's hope the pattern doesn't continue for a third week." Nick Harley of Den of Geek wrote, "'The Blue Flu' is also incredibly funny. This is the best Boyle material we've gotten in a long time."
