= PB & J (Brooklyn Nine-Nine) =

- Brooklyn Nine-Nine episode
- Episode no.: Season 8 Episode 5
- Directed by: Gail Mancuso
- Written by: Lamar Woods & Jeff Topolski
- Cinematography by: Rick Page
- Editing by: Jason Gill
- Production code: 808
- Original air date: August 26, 2021
- Running time: 21 minutes

Guest appearances
- Craig Robinson as Doug Judy; Nicole Byer as Trudy Judy; Brent Chase as Vince Michael Thompson; Jonathan Ohye as Theodore Rawlins; Andre Pelzer as Trooper Peyton

Episode chronology
← Previous "Balancing"	Next → "The Setup"
- Brooklyn Nine-Nine season 8

"PB & J" is the 5th episode of the eighth season of the American television police sitcom series Brooklyn Nine-Nine, and the 148th overall episode of the series. The episode was written by co-producer Lamar Woods and Jeff Topolski and directed by Gail Mancuso. It aired on August 26, 2021, on NBC, airing back-to-back with the follow-up episode, "The Set Up".

The show revolves around the fictitious 99th precinct of the New York Police Department in Brooklyn and the officers and detectives that work in the precinct. In this episode, Doug Judy is arrested for his crimes in another state and Jake agrees to transfer him to the prison so they can have one last fun time together before his incarceration. However, Jake finds out the Pontiac Bandit is planning to escape from him again.

According to Nielsen Media Research, the episode was seen by an estimated 1.90 million household viewers and gained a 0.4 ratings share among adults aged 18–49. The episode received generally positive reviews from critics, who praised Samberg's and Robinson's chemistry but some felt the closure to Doug Judy felt "lackluster".

== Plot ==
Trudy Judy (Nicole Byer) visits the precinct, informing Jake (Andy Samberg) that Doug Judy (Craig Robinson) has been arrested in Trenton, New Jersey. He visits him in jail, where Judy explains that he had been arrested as he had an arrest warrant in Trenton, which falls out of Jake's jurisdiction after he cleared his criminal record in New York.

As Judy is about to be transported to South Woods State Prison, Jake agrees to transfer him to the prison so they can have one last fun time together before his incarceration by taking him on a Pontiac Trans Am and both wearing rings with the initials "PB & J" (Pontiac Bandit & Jake). They start their road trip by driving in the Pontiac and giving Judy his last great meal before prison. However, Boyle (Joe Lo Truglio) arrives and tells Jake that he shouldn't trust Judy as he will probably try to escape, and in order to avoid any connection to the Pontiac, has them travel with him in his RV. Jake does not believe him until Judy himself says he will try to escape.

While in the RV, Jake and Judy decide to play a trivia contest: if Jake wins, Judy will not escape but if Judy wins, Jake will let him go. Jake misses the final question when he fails to know if Judy had an earring. However, Jake reveals that he only played the contest in order to buy time as he texted Holt (Andre Braugher) about their location. But Judy states he knew Jake's intentions and he changed his phone numbers so instead of texting Holt, he texted Trudy and his crew is on the way. Jake contacts Holt, who threatens that he will be fired if Judy escapes. In order to avoid Judy's men, Jake rents a Galaxie 500 to drive to prison.

Holt sends a police unit to escort Jake and Judy to the prison. However, Jake becomes suspicious when the police escort reroutes and deviates from the original route. Jake loses the police escort and Judy confesses they didn't work for him. He decides to use his phone's GPS to go to the prison but he ends up cornered by Trudy and some henchmen; Judy changed the destination from his phone while they were in the car. However, Judy is shocked that the henchmen intend to kill Jake, as Trudy had hired them on Craigslist because Judy's regular henchmen were arrested.

Judy gives Jake a signal and they both take down the henchmen. The police arrive and Judy and the henchmen are arrested. Jake and Judy talk briefly before he is taken by the police with Judy blaming himself for being friends with a cop and they hug. Two weeks later, Judy talks to Jake to say he is glad that they were friends. However, Jake finds that Judy is not in prison, but in Amsterdam to start a new life. Judy implies that Jake put a pen on Judy when they hugged, which eventually led to his escape. They both reaffirm their friendship before hanging up.

== Production ==
=== Development ===
In August 2021, it was announced that the fifth episode of the season would be titled "PB & J" and that Lamar Woods and Jeff Topolski would serve as writers while Gail Mancuso would direct. Despite being the fifth episode of the season to air, it was the eighth to be produced.

== Reception ==
=== Viewers ===
According to Nielsen Media Research, the episode was seen by an estimated 1.90 million household viewers and gained a 0.4 ratings share among adults aged 18–49. This means that 0.4 percent of all households with televisions watched the episode. This was a 28% increase over the previous episode, which was watched by 1.48 million viewers and a 0.3 ratings share. With these ratings, Brooklyn Nine-Nine was the highest rated show on NBC for the night, second on its timeslot and second for the night, behind Big Brother.

=== Critical reviews ===
"PB & J" received generally positive reviews from critics. Vikram Murthi of The A.V. Club gave the episode a "B" rating, writing, "In classic sitcom fashion, these episodes became more high-concept with each successive year as Judy became more of a buddy and less of a nemesis. Robinson and Samberg share a simpatico energy (not to mention similar musical prowess), so even as their episodes became more predictable or outlandish, their exchanges tended to ground their adventures in a buoyant sensibility. Goofy banter goes a long way."

Brian Tallerico of Vulture gave the episode a 3 star rating out of 5 and wrote, "In the end, it's not the best episode for the Pontiac Bandit, but a lot of this season is already feeling like echoes of things that the show used to do better. It's just entertaining enough because the characters are still so very likable, but it's less of a victory lap and more of the final leg of a marathon — a little tired after all this time."

Nick Harley of Den of Geek wrote, "All in all, it's a lackluster conclusion to the Pontiac Bandit saga. It would have been hard to top season 7's 'The Takeback', and 'PB+J' doesn't even really seem to try. The quirky charms of the Jake and Judy relationship feel phoned in and less inventive than ever before."
