= The Set Up (Brooklyn Nine-Nine) =

- Brooklyn Nine-Nine episode
- Episode no.: Season 8 Episode 6
- Directed by: Maggie Carey
- Written by: Jess Dweck & Nick Perdue
- Cinematography by: Rick Page
- Editing by: Ryan Neatha Johnson
- Production code: 805
- Original air date: August 26, 2021
- Running time: 21 minutes

Guest appearances
- John C. McGinley as Frank O'Sullivan; LaMonica Garrett as FBI Agent Feingold; Jacob Berger as Officer David Duke Marzipan; Dane Michael Oliver as James Caton; Alex Skinner as Pizza Delivery Guy; A.J. Tannen as Mel Jenkins

Episode chronology
← Previous "PB & J"	Next → "Game of Boyles"
- Brooklyn Nine-Nine season 8

"The Set Up" is the 6th episode of the eighth season of the American television police sitcom series Brooklyn Nine-Nine, and the 149th overall episode of the series. The episode was written by co-executive producer Jess Dweck and Nick Perdue and directed by Maggie Carey. It aired on August 26, 2021 on NBC, airing back-to-back with the previous episode, "PB & J".

The show revolves around the fictitious 99th precinct of the New York Police Department in Brooklyn and the officers and detectives that work in the precinct. In this episode, Jake ends up making a wrongful arrest when he investigates an FBI case. After O'Sullivan offers to drop the suspension charges against him, Jake believes they set him up so they can take down Amy's NYPD reform program. Meanwhile, Terry and Boyle compete against each other in selling candy.

According to Nielsen Media Research, the episode was seen by an estimated 1.45 million household viewers and gained a 0.3 ratings share among adults aged 18–49. The episode received positive reviews from critics, who praised Braugher's performance in the episode, with many highlighting his speech at the end of the episode.

== Plot ==
The squad is called to Downtown Brooklyn for a bomb threat on a The Marvelous Mrs. Maisel tour bus. However, the Federal Bureau of Investigation has already been called and is taking over the case. Holt (Andre Braugher) quickly hands them the case, which frustrates Jake (Andy Samberg).

Jake confides in Rosa (Stephanie Beatriz) that he feels like the FBI is not taking the case seriously. That night, he decides to investigate on his own and finds a suspicious man arriving at the bomb location, which is close to an IRS building. The man tries to flee but Jake catches him and arrests him. However, Holt tells him that the FBI already solved the case and caught the criminal, who confessed. As the man Jake arrested was in custody, he lost his job and plans to sue the precinct for the wrongful arrest, which makes Holt consider suspending Jake. However, O'Sullivan (John C. McGinley) shows up and offers to drop the suspension charges against Jake.

Jake tells Holt and Amy (Melissa Fumero) that he suspects that O'Sullivan set him up so he could take down Amy's NYPD reform program. In order to prove if he hired the man, Amy and Rosa take O'Sullivan to a bar to get him drunk but both end up drunk and O'Sullivan has not reached his limit due to his high alcohol tolerance. After some rounds, Amy confronts him about blackmailing Jake but O'Sullivan says he isn't involved in that, he was only messing with the precinct's vending machine. He also tells Amy and Rosa that he was sincerely helping Jake because he believes that no police officer should ever face discipline for their actions under any circumstances, which completely disgusts them. Amy tries to warn Jake, who may have found a lead on the man giving a fake address, but he left his phone at the precinct.

Amy and Rosa reach Jake to warn him about the man's innocence but Rosa accidentally crashes her bike on a stand, exposing Jake's cover to the man. While Jake talks to Holt about the case, O'Sullivan enters, offering another deal in which the police will not admit any wrongdoing and use it to their advantage. This makes Holt "huffy," and he reprimands O'Sullivan for letting his officers go without any punishment as it will build more trust issues with the community. Jake then decides to confess that he made a mistake by following a case beyond his jurisdiction and committing police intimidation. Jake is suspended for five months but he feels good for having done the right thing.

Meanwhile, Terry (Terry Crews) wants to continue a yearly tradition where Scully (Joel McKinnon Miller) buys candy from his kids. However, Scully reveals that he started buying candy from Boyle (Joe Lo Truglio), as Nikolaj has begun selling candies. They both start competing with each other and accuse each other of sabotaging their candies, unaware that O'Sullivan hired his men to sabotage them. Their arguments lead to a fight with apples, which ends when Boyle hits Terry in the mouth. They apologize for their behavior, although Terry still intends to continue selling candies.

== Production ==
In August 2021, it was announced that the sixth episode of the season would be titled "The Set Up" and that Jess Dweck and Nick Perdue would serve as writers while Maggie Carey would direct. Despite being the sixth episode of the season to air, it was the fifth to be produced.

== Reception ==
=== Viewers ===
According to Nielsen Media Research, the episode was seen by an estimated 1.45 million household viewers and gained a 0.3 ratings share among adults aged 18–49. This means that 0.3 percent of all households with televisions watched the episode. This was a 24% decrease over the previous episode, which was watched by 1.90 million viewers and a 0.4 ratings share. With these ratings, Brooklyn Nine-Nine was the highest rated show on NBC for the night, second on its timeslot and second for the night, behind Big Brother.

=== Critical reviews ===
"The Set Up" received positive reviews from critics. Vikram Murthi of The A.V. Club gave the episode an "A−" rating, writing, "While 'PB & J' was a relatively light affair, 'The Setup' features Brooklyn Nine-Nine using classic sitcom plotting — three dovetailed storylines that contain 'wacky' hijinks — with updated political awareness."

Brian Tallerico of Vulture gave the episode a 4 star rating out of 5 and wrote, "'The Setup' is one of the better episodes of Brooklyn Nine-Nine's season eight and, arguably, would have made a stronger season premiere, or at least second episode of its premiere night, in that it more subtly highlights the failures of copaganda than other episodes this season."

Nick Harley of Den of Geek wrote, "There seems to be a serious quality issue with the episodes this season that aren't set around police reform and the battle with union representative O'Sullivan, and that's very disappointing for the show in its final season, especially when season 7 featured so many funny, inventive episodes. One must wonder if a combination of fatigue and real-life issues like COVID-19 factored into the quality of season 8. With only a few episodes left, Brooklyn Nine-Nine will need to course correct and in a hurry."
