= The Good Ones (Brooklyn Nine-Nine) =

- Brooklyn Nine-Nine episode
- Episode no.: Season 8 Episode 1
- Directed by: Cortney Carrillo
- Written by: David Phillips & Dewayne Perkins
- Cinematography by: Rick Page
- Editing by: Jason Gill
- Production code: 801
- Original air date: August 12, 2021
- Running time: 21 minutes

Guest appearances
- John C. McGinley as Frank O'Sullivan; Rebecca Wisocky as Captain Lamazar; Shawntay Dalon as Aisha Fulton; Christian Belnavis as Victor Collins; Jennifer DeFilippo as Tina; Jaiden Alexander McLeod as Ronnie Johnson Jr.

Episode chronology
← Previous "Lights Out"	Next → "The Lake House"
- Brooklyn Nine-Nine season 8

"The Good Ones" is the season premiere of the eighth season of the American television police sitcom series Brooklyn Nine-Nine, and the 144th overall episode of the series. The episode was written by executive producer David Phillips and co-producer Dewayne Perkins and directed by co-executive producer Cortney Carrillo. It aired on August 12, 2021, on NBC, airing back-to-back with the follow-up episode, "The Lake House".

The show revolves around the fictitious 99th precinct of the New York Police Department in Brooklyn and the officers and detectives that work in the precinct. In this episode, Rosa has quit her police career after the George Floyd protests and is now a private investigator. She reluctantly teams up with Jake, who wants to prove he is part of "the good ones". Meanwhile, Amy tries to rekindle her friendship with Holt after she fears he will view her differently, while Terry deals with Boyle's new attitude.

The episode received positive reviews from critics, who praised the show's take on the George Floyd protests, although some were still skeptical about its approach to the themes it raised.

== Plot ==
In June 2020, amidst the COVID-19 pandemic, Rosa (Stephanie Beatriz) announces that she is quitting the precinct and her career after the George Floyd protests. Hitchcock (Dirk Blocker) has retired and moved to Brazil, but still keeps in contact with everyone via FaceTime. Jake's (Andy Samberg) reaction accidentally starts a chain of events in the precinct that culminates with a blackout.

In Spring 2021, the squad celebrates at the bar as Amy (Melissa Fumero) returns to work after being on parental leave. To their surprise, Rosa shows up, now working as a private investigator. In order to prove to her that he is one of the "good cops", Jake assists Rosa in a case that involves police brutality. However, the Patrolmen's Benevolent Association boss Frank O'Sullivan (John C. McGinley) prevents them from acquiring crucial evidence in the case. They then infiltrate his office to download evidence from his computer and present it to Captain Lamazar (Rebecca Wisocky) from another precinct. However, Lamazar deletes the evidence as she fears the repercussions of its content. Despite losing Rosa's client, Rosa and Jake rekindle their friendship.

Meanwhile, Amy fears Holt (Andre Braugher) views her as a stranger after a small talk and asks for Terry's (Terry Crews) help by using one of Scully's books. She participates in activities with Holt to rekindle their friendship but Holt storms out after a few activities. He later confesses to Amy that the reason for the small talk is because he had problems at home: Kevin and he are separating. Terry also has to deal with Boyle (Joe Lo Truglio), who has been showing excessive support for the African-American community in the past months. Terry talks with Boyle, telling him to just "do the right thing" because he really wants to do it.

== Production ==
"The Good Ones" was written by producers David Phillips and Dewayne Perkins; it was directed by Cortney Carrillo. In June 2020, Terry Crews, who portrays Terry Jeffords, revealed that the producers had scrapped four completed episodes in light of the George Floyd protests and the Black Lives Matter movement. He explained that series co-creator Dan Goor had "four new episodes all ready to go and they just threw them in the trash. We have to start over. Right now we don't know which direction it's going to go in. The cast had a lot of somber talks about it and deep conversations and we hope through this we're going to make something that will be truly groundbreaking this year. We have an opportunity here, and we plan to use it in the best way possible."

== Release ==
"The Good Ones" first aired on August 12, 2021, on NBC. It was originally set to air in late 2020, however it, along with the rest of Brooklyn Nine-Nine's eighth season, was delayed due to COVID-19 restrictions. It was immediately followed by "The Lake House", the second episode of the season eight.

=== Critical reviews ===
"The Good Ones" received positive reviews from critics. Matt Fowler of IGN gave the double-episode premiere a "great" 8 out of 10 rating, writing, "Brooklyn Nine-Nine shows its dexterity as season eight opens, providing a parade of comedy while also leaning into serious socio-political issues. It deftly navigates this tricky balance all while making sure each character remains true to their own personalities and motivations. The first two episodes are a hilarious start to what looks to be a stunningly good final season."

LaToya Ferguson of The A.V. Club gave the episode a "B" rating, writing, "'The Good Ones' is a good season premiere. It's especially helped by the fact that Brooklyn Nine-Nine has gotten away from those big, world-shattering season finales, as it doesn't have to scramble to figure out how to really undo any of that. But ultimately, Brooklyn Nine-Nine is saying with 'The Good Ones' that there's no reason to feel uneasy continuing to watch this show, because the Nine-Nine squad is made up of the good ones. However, it's still doing so while saying everyone else is the bad ones. It's kind of hard to feel optimistic there, isn't it?"

Alan Sepinwall of Rolling Stone wrote, "Mostly, though, continuing Brooklyn Nine-Nine in this environment just seems untenable, with these episodes not likely to satisfy either viewers who expect the show to more radically change itself, or those who just want the same series it was before months of lockdown and protests. Give the creative team credit for at least trying to acknowledge the ugliness now very publicly associated with policing, but the post-office version of Nine-Nine feels like it would have been the better way to go for a chance to spend a few more weeks with Jake and his friends." Nick Harley of Den of Geek rated the episode 4 stars out of 5." He felt that the episode was an "excellent starting point" for the eighth season; Harley noted how it was a good sign for Brooklyn Nine-Nine ability to adapt.

Brian Tallerico of Vulture gave the episode a 4 star rating out of 5 and wrote, "The season premiere of Brooklyn Nine-Nine needed to feel familiar to fans of the show while recognizing how the world has changed since it debuted nearly a decade ago. The writers pulled off that tricky dynamic; now let's see if they can maintain the balancing act for the entire final stretch or if this season will be one of the bad ones."

Karen Han of Slate wrote, "Brooklyn Nine-Nine does the best job possible of acknowledging the problem with portraying cops as uncomplicated heroes while still remaining a good-natured, funny show, but it feels fitting, and fortunate, that this is its final season. There's nowhere to go that won't feel like some sort of a cop-out (no pun intended). But the show has pulled off miracles before, so the fact that the new episodes are at least thoughtful about the predicament its good-guy characters are stuck in is promising for the series' finale — and its legacy."

Emily St. James of Vox wrote, "The episode highlights just how much Brooklyn Nine-Nine will gladly question the institution it's set within while insisting that the people we're watching every week are largely beyond reproach. For as much as Brooklyn Nine-Nine tries to throw cold water on the idea of any cops being 'the good ones,' its characters are supposed to be, well, 'the good ones.' So as long as Brooklyn Nine-Nine won't push its characters a bit, it's going to struggle to meet its stated goals."
