= The Lake House (Brooklyn Nine-Nine) =

- Brooklyn Nine-Nine episode
- Episode no.: Season 8 Episode 2
- Directed by: Kevin Bray
- Written by: Neil Campbell & Marcy Jarreau
- Cinematography by: Rick Page
- Editing by: Ryan Neatha Johnson
- Production code: 802
- Original air date: August 12, 2021
- Running time: 21 minutes

Guest appearance
- Marc Evan Jackson as Kevin Cozner

Episode chronology
| ← Previous "The Good Ones" | Next → "Blue Flu" |
- Brooklyn Nine-Nine season 8

"The Lake House" is the 2nd episode of the eighth season of the American television police sitcom series Brooklyn Nine-Nine, and the 145th overall episode of the series. The episode was written by Neil Campbell and Marcy Jarreau and directed by Kevin Bray. It aired on August 12, 2021 on NBC, airing back-to-back with the previous episode, "The Good Ones".

The show revolves around the fictitious 99th precinct of the New York Police Department in Brooklyn and the officers and detectives that work in the precinct. In this episode, in order to help Holt through his separation, the squad goes with him on a weekend getaway to his Lake House, but Jake (with Terry's help) is actually planning to reunite Holt and Kevin. Meanwhile, Boyle helps Amy with Mac although the situation quickly spirals out of control while Rosa bonds with Scully while under the influence of cannabis edibles.

The episode received generally positive reviews from critics, who praised the humor, though some found the episode to be too formulaic.

== Plot ==
Intending to help Holt (Andre Braugher) through his separation from Kevin (Marc Evan Jackson), Terry (Terry Crews) suggests that the squad take him on a weekend getaway to Holt's lake house. Amy (Melissa Fumero) brings Mac on the trip, while Rosa (Stephanie Beatriz) uses medically-prescribed edibles to get through the trip.

Arriving at the lake house, the squad discover that there is no lake in the area (Holt explains they named it after its original owner, Kirsopp Lake) and that the house mostly consists of sitting rooms, with no television or Internet. To complicate things, Jake (Andy Samberg) has invited Kevin to the house in an attempt to rekindle his relationship with Holt. The squad is annoyed with Jake and refuses to help, though Terry offers Jake his clandestine help, preferring to stay on the fence until the last possible moment in case Jake's plan goes wrong.

Terry and Jake plan a romantic picnic for Holt and Kevin, luring them both into the woods on the pretext of birdwatching. However, the plan goes wrong when bees swarm and Kevin suffers an allergic reaction. Holt and Kevin realize Jake's plan, yet still bond when Holt finds a rare corncrake and describes it to Kevin. Despite this tender moment, Kevin abruptly leaves the house, leading Holt to believe their relationship is over. Jake later has an epiphany about the birdwatching and realizes Kevin still loves Holt; they agree to couples therapy.

Meanwhile, Boyle (Joe Lo Truglio) wants to help Amy with putting Mac to sleep and she reluctantly accepts. She is frustrated to see that Boyle has no problem in taking care of the baby. However, Boyle accidentally locks Mac in his room after putting Mac down for his nap. Despite his attempts to hide it from Amy, she finds out and crashes through the door to retrieve Mac. After a talk with Jake, she thanks Boyle for helping her but also scolds him for trapping Mac. Rosa bonds with Scully (Joel McKinnon Miller) while eating chips under the influence of the edibles and agrees to go with him to Buffalo, New York to tour chip factories, much to her horror when she becomes sober.

== Production ==
=== Development ===
In July 2021, it was announced that the second episode of the season would be titled "The Lake House" and that Neil Campbell and Marcy Jarreau would serve as writers while Kevin Bray would direct.

== Reception ==
=== Critical reviews ===
"The Lake House" received generally positive reviews from critics. Matt Fowler of IGN gave the double-episode premiere a "great" 8 out of 10 rating, writing, "Brooklyn Nine-Nine shows its dexterity as season eight opens, providing a parade of comedy while also leaning into serious socio-political issues. It deftly navigates this tricky balance all while making sure each character remains true to their own personalities and motivations. The first two episodes are a hilarious start to what looks to be a stunningly good final season."

LaToya Ferguson of The A.V. Club gave the episode a "B−" rating, writing, "The issue with doing a double premiere is that while it may make sense from a network standpoint to include an episode that is simply non-stop jokes — especially after an episode like 'The Good Ones' —it might not always tonally work. Or, as is the case for the combination of 'The Good Ones' and 'The Lake House,' the latter episode might somewhat undercut an aspect of the former."

Alan Sepinwall of Rolling Stone wrote, "Mostly, though, continuing Brooklyn Nine-Nine in this environment just seems untenable, with these episodes not likely to satisfy either viewers who expect the show to more radically change itself, or those who just want the same series it was before months of lockdown and protests. Give the creative team credit for at least trying to acknowledge the ugliness now very publicly associated with policing, but the post-office version of Nine-Nine feels like it would have been the better way to go for a chance to spend a few more weeks with Jake and his friends." Nick Harley of Den of Geek gave the episode a 4 star rating out of 5 and wrote, "This is Brooklyn Nine-Nine by the numbers, and it loses some points for lame, outdated jokes about weed edibles and a cliché parenting story with Amy and Charles. However, this is a great recurring bit about how Terry loves hedging, but hates ledges. Overall, it's a passable, if unspectacular installment."

Brian Tallerico of Vulture gave the episode a 4 star rating out of 5 and wrote, "Overall, it's an episode that spins its wheels a bit and feels longer than it is, but that also has enough unexpected sources of humor to balance out the wacky physical comedy like locked doors, allergic reactions, and a very high Rosa. It's not as ambitious as the season premiere, but a solid follow-up in that it counters the internal division of that half-hour with one about how much these people still truly need each other. After all, they're family." Emily VanDerWerff of Vox wrote, "'The Lake House' is full of standard sitcom stuff. Certainly, Brooklyn Nine-Nine should not be all heavy topics, all the time. People's lives go on in darkness. We're still patching up marriages and having babies and hanging out with friends, even in a pandemic. Life is never all one thing, and art should reflect that."
