= Renewal (Brooklyn Nine-Nine) =

- Brooklyn Nine-Nine episode
- Episode no.: Season 8 Episode 8
- Directed by: Beth McCarthy Miller
- Written by: Stephanie A. Ritter & Beau Rawlins
- Cinematography by: Rick Page
- Editing by: Ryan Neatha Johnson
- Production code: 807
- Original air date: September 2, 2021
- Running time: 21 minutes

Guest appearances
- John C. McGinley as Frank O'Sullivan; Marc Evan Jackson as Kevin Cozner; K Callan as Carol O'Sullivan; David Grant Wright as Justice of the Peace

Episode chronology
← Previous "Game of Boyles"	Next → "The Last Day"
- Brooklyn Nine-Nine season 8

"Renewal" is the 8th episode of the eighth season of the American television police sitcom series Brooklyn Nine-Nine, and the 151st overall episode of the series. The episode was written by story editor Stephanie A. Ritter and Beau Rawlins and directed by Beth McCarthy Miller. It aired on September 2, 2021 on NBC, airing back-to-back with the previous episode, "Game of Boyles".

The show revolves around the fictitious 99th precinct of the New York Police Department in Brooklyn and the officers and detectives that work in the precinct. In this episode, Holt announces he has set up a vow renewal ceremony with Kevin and tells the detectives he will retire after he and Amy pass the police reform program. On the day of the ceremony, they find out that O'Sullivan has sabotaged their data and they intend to recoup it before Kevin finds out.

According to Nielsen Media Research, the episode was seen by an estimated 1.31 million household viewers and gained a 0.3 ratings share among adults aged 18–49. The episode received generally positive reviews from critics, who praised the new character development for the show.

== Plot ==
Holt (Andre Braugher) announces he has set up a vow renewal ceremony with Kevin (Marc Evan Jackson) and tells the detectives he will retire after he and Amy (Melissa Fumero) pass the police reform program, surprising the squad. He asks Jake (Andy Samberg) not to say anything to Amy until the program passes and he agrees.

On the day of the ceremony, they find out that O'Sullivan (John C. McGinley) has sabotaged their CompStat data, leading Holt and Jake to try to steal O'Sullivan's laptop computer from his mother Carol (K Callan), while Terry (Terry Crews) and Amy use O'Sullivan's Billy Joel admiration to secure his thumbprint with fake gum, all while hiding from Kevin that Holt is working on the day of their vow renewal. However, things get complicated when O'Sullivan wants to keep the fake gum, Amy gets distracted after learning of Holt's retirement from Terry, and Jake and Holt are caught and locked in Carol's basement.

At the ceremony, Cheddar exposes Holt's work to Kevin. Terry simultaneously convinces Amy and O'Sullivan to move on with their lives and gets O'Sullivan's thumbprint. Kevin and Rosa save Jake and Holt from Carol by posing as police officers. He accepts that Holt is too passionate to retire and the two renew their vows before delivering the proper data to One Police Plaza. Two weeks later, Holt informs the precinct that the commissioner accepted the reform proposal and plans to implement it citywide. Holt then announces that he will not retire, as he will be promoted to deputy commissioner in charge of the reform and he is taking Amy with him, with a promotion to chief. That night, Amy questions how her life will change with her new promotion but Jake assures her they will know what to do.

== Production ==
In August 2021, it was announced that the eighth episode of the season would be titled "Renewal" and that story editor Stephanie A. Ritter and Beau Rawlins would serve as writers while Beth McCarthy-Miller would direct. Despite being the eighth episode of the season to air, it was the seventh to be produced.

== Reception ==
=== Viewers ===
According to Nielsen Media Research, the episode was seen by an estimated 1.31 million household viewers and gained a 0.3 ratings share among adults aged 18–49. This means that 0.3 percent of all households with televisions watched the episode. This was a 29% decrease over the previous episode, which was watched by 1.84 million viewers and a 0.4 ratings share. With these ratings, Brooklyn Nine-Nine was the highest rated show on NBC for the night, fourth on its timeslot and fourth for the night, behind CMA Jam, Big Brother, and Thursday Night Football.

=== Critical reviews ===
"Renewal" received generally positive reviews from critics. Vikram Murthi of The A.V. Club gave the episode a "B" rating, writing, "As I've said before, there was no way for Brooklyn Nine-Nine to please everyone with their post-2020 worldview adjustment, but the ways they've addressed the zeitgeist have generally fared better than I expected. This was the first time when their efforts felt a bit phony, and try as they might, a zany undercover scheme can't distract from the core naïveté of it all."

Brian Tallerico of Vulture gave the episode a 3 star rating out of 5 and wrote, "A better episode than its partner on this penultimate night in the history of Brooklyn Nine-Nine still disappoints a bit, in part because of what it sets up in its first few scenes but also because it feels like the writers are kind of bringing this complex season to a close in what could end up being a pretty shallow manner."

Nick Harley of Den of Geek wrote, "Comparing the end of this episode to the dark reality of the first feels like you're watching two completely different shows. It's understandable that a sitcom might want to have the sunny side ending, but this opens up the issue of whether this show was ever the appropriate place to be having these conversations in the first place. It's yet another example of how this season of Brooklyn Nine-Nine just cannot please both sides of its audience."
