= The To Do List =

2013 US romantic comedy film by Maggie Carey

- Theatrical release poster
- Directed by: Maggie Carey
- Written by: Maggie Carey
- Produced by: Jennifer Todd; Brian Robbins; Sharla Sumpter Bridgett
- Starring: Aubrey Plaza; Johnny Simmons; Bill Hader; Alia Shawkat; Sarah Steele; Scott Porter; Rachel Bilson; Christopher Mintz-Plasse; Andy Samberg; Donald Glover; Connie Britton; Clark Gregg
- Cinematography: Doug Emmett
- Edited by: Paul Frank
- Music by: Raney Shockne
- Production companies: Varsity Pictures; The Mark Gordon Company
- Distributed by: CBS Films
- Release date: July 26, 2013 (United States)
- Running time: 104 minutes
- Country: United States
- Language: English
- Budget: $1.5 million
- Box office: $3.9 million

The To Do List is a 2013 American romantic comedy film written and directed by Maggie Carey in her feature film directorial debut, starring an ensemble cast of Aubrey Plaza, Johnny Simmons, Bill Hader, Alia Shawkat, Sarah Steele, Scott Porter, Rachel Bilson, Christopher Mintz-Plasse, Andy Samberg, Donald Glover, Connie Britton, and Clark Gregg. The film centers on a recent high school graduate (Plaza) who feels she needs to have more sexual experiences before she starts college.

The film was released in the United States on July 26, 2013, by CBS Films.

== Plot ==
Brandy Klark, from Boise, Idaho, is an overachieving but socially awkward teenager who graduates as the valedictorian of her high school in 1993. After the ceremony, Brandy's two best friends, Wendy and Fiona, take Brandy to a party, where she gets drunk for the first time. Brandy makes out with a muscular college boy she has a crush on named Rusty Waters. Since the room is dark, he mistakes Brandy for someone else and when he realizes who she is, he rejects her. Brandy blames her lack of sexual experience and resolves to learn all about sex over the summer to prepare for college. She decides that her end-of-summer goal will be to have sex with Rusty to complete her "To Do List".

Brandy gets a job at the pool as a lifeguard to be close to Rusty and her study-buddy Cameron Mitchell. As the newbie, she is hazed by her slacker boss, Willy and her other co-workers by being given the most unpleasant jobs. Brandy is told to clean waste from the pool that appears to be feces. She assumes her co-workers are playing a prank on her, based on the Baby Ruth joke from the film Caddyshack, so she takes a bite only to find out it is actual feces. As revenge, she pushes Willy, who does not know how to swim, into the pool. She agrees to teach him how to swim in exchange for ending the hazing.

Brandy gets advice from her sister, Amber, her mother, and her two best friends, while her father, a conservative judge, is uncomfortable with the talk of sex. Using this information, she makes a "to do list" of sexual acts to learn and perform. As the summer progresses, Brandy has several sexual encounters with Cameron and other boys, all while trying to catch Rusty's eye. Cameron begins to fall in love with her but is crushed after discovering her list and realizing he was just part of her "mission". Willy catches Brandy, Wendy, Fiona, and adult members of a male grunge band in the pool after hours. Brandy is sent home where she is confronted by Cameron over the list. Cameron leaves in a huff and Brandy cries. Duffy, whom Wendy has a crush on, comes over to comfort Brandy and the two hook up.

When Wendy and Fiona come over to watch the film Beaches with Brandy, they discover her list and see the list of boys with whom she had experimented. They get upset after finding out that Brandy hooked up with one of their crushes and leave angrily. They declare that Brandy has failed to put "hoes before bros" and call her a slut.

Brandy finally gets close to Rusty when they vandalize a rival pool, but they get caught because Brandy leaves her bra, which has her name on it, and Willy fires her. Brandy asks out Rusty, and he takes her to a popular make-out spot to have sex, but the sex is brief and disappointing. She sees her father and mother in the Dodge Caravan next to them having sex, causing her to freak out and demand that Rusty take her home immediately.

Willy goes to the Klark house to stop Brandy from having sex with Rusty, but is met at the door by Amber, who seduces him. When Rusty and Brandy arrive home, a jealous Cameron is there to meet him with a sucker punch, and they fight until Brandy breaks it up. She compliments them on their good qualities, apologizes sincerely to Cameron for using him, and offers her own view of sex.

Afterward, she seeks out Wendy and Fiona to apologize to them. She sings "Wind Beneath My Wings" at Wendy's door, and the two girls eventually join in, forgiving her. Brandy meets with Willy at the pool, and he offers her his job if she comes back next summer—as he has quit to follow the Grateful Dead.

In the fall, Brandy and Cameron meet again at Georgetown University. Brandy apologizes to Cameron. They have various forms of sex, and Brandy finally achieves orgasm, the last thing on her list, through anal sex, just as her father walks in on them.

== Cast ==
- Aubrey Plaza as Brandy Klark
- Johnny Simmons as Cameron Mitchell
- Bill Hader as Willy McLean
- Scott Porter as Rusty Waters
- Alia Shawkat as Fiona Forster
- Sarah Steele as Wendy Summers
- Rachel Bilson as Amber Klark
- Christopher Mintz-Plasse as Duffy
- Andy Samberg as Van King
- Connie Britton as Jean Klark
- Clark Gregg as Judge George Klark
- Donald Glover as Derrick Murphy
- Adam Pally as Chip
- Jack McBrayer as Oakcrest Pool Manager
- Nolan Gould as Max
- Bryce Clyde Jenkins as Benji
- Kevin M. Brennan as Guitar Player, Van's Band
- Zachary Ross as Drummer, Van's Band
- Scott Davidson as Bass, Van's Band
- Brian Huskey as Principal
- D.C. Pierson as Hillcrest Lifeguard #1
- Dominic Dierkas as Hillcrest Lifeguard #2
- Liz Cackowski as Aerobics Instructor
- Skyler Vallo as Hot Girl At Party
- Chrystal Harris as Stripper
- Lauren Lapkus as Girl Heckler

== Production ==
The script was originally entitled The Hand Job. The film was rejected by studios, but ended up on the "blacklist" of the most popular unproduced scripts of 2010. A live table reading of the script at the Austin Film Festival led CBS Films to produce the project.

== Reception ==
=== Box office ===
During the film's first weekend, The To Do List earned $1,579,402 from 591 theaters, opening in 15th place. This was below expectations; the Los Angeles Times predicted an opening weekend of $2–3 million, and CBS Films was expecting $2 million.

=== Critical response ===
The To Do List received mixed reviews, holding a 55% rating on review aggregation website Rotten Tomatoes, based on 119 reviews, with an average rating of 5.75/10. The site's critical consensus reads: "The To Do List may play things disappointingly safe given its rather daring premise, but writer-director Maggie Carey's sure hand – and Aubrey Plaza's performance – keep the laughs coming." On Metacritic, the film has a weighted average score of 61 out of 100, based on reviews from 40 critics.

Plaza's role as Brandy Klark was praised by film critic Alan Scherstuhl, of The Village Voice, who wrote "unlike for the female characters in previous sex comedies, sex for her is a straight-up choice, something she offers or refuses according to no agenda but her own", but notes that "there's something dispiriting about [the film's] junky look, indifferent pacing, and sketch-comedy characterization."

On a more critical front, Rafer Guzman of Newsday gave the film one out of four stars, calling it "a fake feminist comedy that pays lip service to female empowerment but inadvertently makes sex seem both demeaning and meaningless," as well as "vulgar, cynical and rarely funny". Paul Doro of the Milwaukee Journal Sentinel criticized the film for its extreme raunchiness, which he found to be unneeded; he named the film "an absurdly profane comedy that spends its entire time serving up filthy jokes and then trying to top them."
