= Steve Faber =

American screenwriter

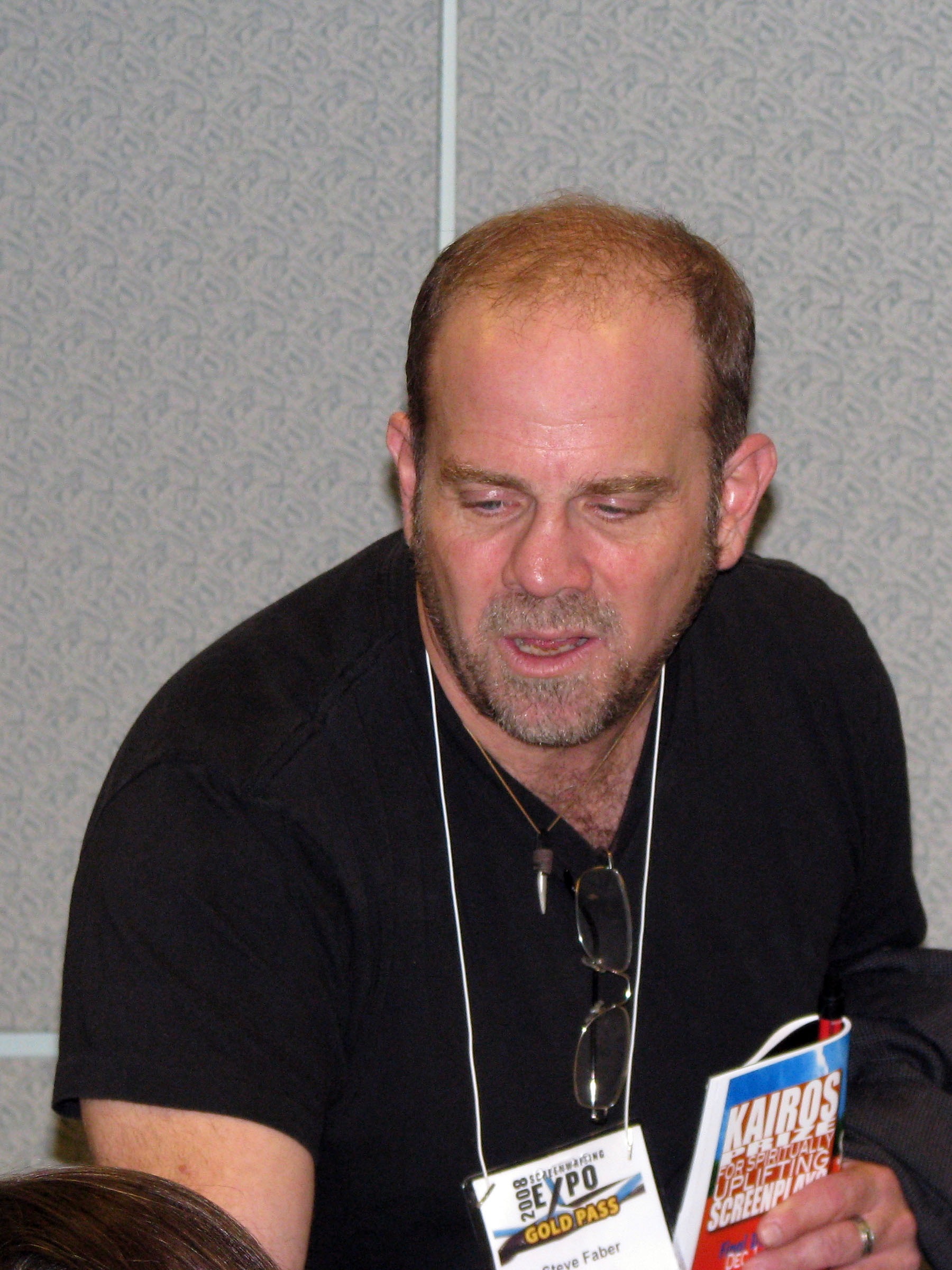
In November 2008

Steve Faber is an American screenwriter best known for his work on the movie Wedding Crashers.

== Career ==
In August 2013, New Line released the Faber-scripted film We're the Millers, with Jennifer Aniston and Jason Sudeikis. Faber also writes poetry and illustrates said poems. Faber has a satiric column on The Huffington Post called "Washingwood." Faber also served as Editor: Politics & Culture, Penthouse Magazine. Faber moved into a different genre after writing NOVEL FIFTEEN for The Blumhouse Book of Nightmares: The Haunted City (Blumhouse Books/Random House). He was awarded by the WGA for writing Wedding Crashers, named among the 100 best comedic screenplays in cinematic history.
