= Anna Bogomazova =

Russian kickboxer, martial artist, professional wrestler and valet

- Born: 7 April 1990 (age 36); Voronezh, Russian SFSR, Soviet Union
- Other names: The Master of Sports
- Nationality: Russian
- Height: 6 ft 1 in (1.85 m)
- Weight: 155 lb (70 kg)
- Division: Middleweight
- Style: Kickboxing, Taekwondo
- Fighting out of: Miami, Florida
- Rank: Black belt in Taekwondo
- Years active: 2004–present

Other information
- Website: www.annabogomazova.com

Anna Bogomazova, known professionally as Anya Zova (born 7 April 1990), is a Russian comedian, actress, producer and former athlete, born in the Soviet Union and raised by a Ukrainian mother and Russian father. She worked in the WWE competing in their developmental territory NXT Wrestling, under the ring name Anya. Bogomazova graduated Russian school and won the Russian Kickboxing Cup in 2011 with a second place. In 2020, Anya made her television debut on NBC's award-winning comedy, Brooklyn Nine-Nine and appeared on the hit CBS series TV series MacGyver. In April 2022, she toured local clubs with her own comedy show about Russia and her life there.

== Early life ==
Bogomazova was born on 7 April 1990 in Voronezh, Russia. At the age of 5, she took up calisthenics, which she studied for seven years. Her parents insisted that she should quit because of her height. From 2003 till 2004, Anna played tennis. At the age of 14 she took up kickboxing. Her styles consist of kickboxing and taekwondo. She eventually earned her black belt in taekwondo.

She graduated from the Voronezh Cooperative Institute and Voronezh State University with the qualifications of a lawyer and a translator in the field of professional communications.

== Martial arts career ==
=== Kickboxing ===
Bogomazova began her career in competitive kickboxing in 2004 with Aleksei Dedov as her coach. She has placed second in the Kickboxing World Championship in 2006 and 2008. She has also placed first in the Kickboxing Russian Championship in 2008 and the Kickboxing World Cup in 2011. From 2006 through 2010 Anna was trained by legendary coach Fuad Farziev.

Since November 2010, she has been training in the U.S.

== Professional wrestling career ==
Anna Bogomazova
Personal information
- Born: 7 April 1990 (age 36) Voronezh, Soviet Union

Professional wrestling career
- Ring name: Anya
- Billed height: 6 ft 1 in (1.85 m)
- Billed weight: 155 lb (70 kg)
- Billed from: Voronezh, Russia
- Trained by: FCW Staff
- Debut: 2012

=== WWE (2012–2013) ===
In August 2012, Bogomazova signed a developmental contract with World Wrestling Entertainment and was assigned to its developmental territory NXT Wrestling (NXT).

In early 2013, she broke her arm during a training session which she claimed lead to being released from her developmental contract on 17 May 2013. She plans on suing WWE for injury and extra for damages due to having two surgeries and now she has a scar on her hand. Bogomazova filed suit against Steve Keirn Inc. and World Wrestling Entertainment Inc. d/b/a Florida Championship Wrestling in Hillsborough County, Florida Circuit Court on 8 March 2017, claiming that the defendants did not properly train other amateur wrestlers, who ran into plaintiff while she warmed-up. On 23 June 2017, the lawsuit was voluntarily dismissed.

== Television ==
Her first TV role was playing Anna Rubov in the sitcom Brooklyn Nine-Nine (NBC Network) in their Season 7, Episode 6, which aired on 5 March 2020. The same year Anna played Krisitina on MacGyver (CBS Network) Season 4, Episode 5, which aired on 6 March 2020.

== See also ==
- List of female kickboxers
