= Game of Boyles =

- Brooklyn Nine-Nine episode
- Episode no.: Season 8 Episode 7
- Directed by: Thembi Banks
- Written by: Paul Welsh & Madeline Walter
- Cinematography by: Rick Page
- Editing by: Jason Gill
- Production code: 806
- Original air date: September 2, 2021
- Running time: 23 minutes

Guest appearances
- Marc Evan Jackson as Kevin Cozner; Christopher Gehrman as Sam Boyle; Gregg Binkley as Lyndon Boyle; Caleb Alexander Smith as Andrea Boyle; Hal Alpert as Pappy Boyle; Ali Eldin as Perp #2; Nicole Ghastin as Mel Boyle; Galen Howard as Tommy Boyle; Frederick Koehler as Becca Boyle; Paul Witten as Todd

Episode chronology
← Previous "The Set Up"	Next → "Renewal"
- Brooklyn Nine-Nine season 8

"Game of Boyles" is the 7th episode of the eighth season of the American television police sitcom series Brooklyn Nine-Nine, and the 150th overall episode of the series. The episode was written by co-producer Paul Welsh and co-producer Madeline Walter and directed by Thembi Banks. It aired on September 2, 2021 on NBC, airing back-to-back with the follow-up episode, "Renewal".

The show revolves around the fictitious 99th precinct of the New York Police Department in Brooklyn and the officers and detectives that work in the precinct. In this episode, Jake and Terry accompany Charles to a family funeral. However, they find that the death was probably orchestrated by someone familiar with the family and set out to find the truth. Meanwhile, Holt has been arguing with Kevin about how many hours he needs to cut back on work, leading Rosa and Amy to suggest Holt use a dating app to make Kevin jealous.

According to Nielsen Media Research, the episode was seen by an estimated 1.84 million household viewers and gained a 0.4 ratings share among adults aged 18–49. The episode received mixed reviews from critics, with critics comparing the episode unfavorably to Knives Out and criticizing Boyle's storyline. Holt's storyline was much more favorably received, with his kiss with Kevin particularly receiving acclaim.

== Plot ==
Charles's (Joe Lo Truglio) great-uncle, Pappy (Hal Alpert), dies and he has been chosen to give the eulogy. Jake (Andy Samberg) and Terry (Terry Crews) agree to accompany him to the funeral, Jake out of boredom due to his suspension, and Terry to get a little time away from his daughters, who are keen on playing pranks on him for TikTok. They arrive at Pappy's farm, which is overrun with nutria, animals that the Boyles consider to be pets and a source of milk.

At the farm, Charles's cousin, Sam (Christopher Gehrman), explains that Pappy's will, which leaves his estate to the Council of Cousins, is missing, and if not found, Pappy's son Lyndon (Gregg Binkley) will inherit everything. Jake then inspects the body and tells the cousins that Pappy was poisoned and he suspects Lyndon, as having the most to gain. Terry thinks Jake is just desperate to have a case to work, but he and Charles agree to help him question other members of the family, who all claim that Lyndon was acting strangely at Pappy's birthday party. Lyndon admits having argued with Pappy, but not over the will; it was over having missed a Zoom family meeting the previous summer. Lyndon claims that he'd gone to the barn to prove he was a loyal member of the family by trying to open the original heirloom jar of "grandmother dough" which only "the one true Boyle" can open, that no one has been able to open in over a hundred years, but Jake finds poison in the barn along with a strand of hair and insists that Lyndon give him one of his own hairs for DNA testing. Sam suggests everyone's DNA be tested so Lyndon won't feel singled out. However, when the results come back, the hair is revealed to be from a rodent. In addition, Charles is revealed to not biologically be a Boyle.

Jake learns from Charles's father that Charles was born from an affair Mrs. Boyle had had with a rival florist, but that he'd never revealed this to Charles. Jake and Terry decide to solve the case before Charles learns of the DNA results. They keep investigating Lyndon, but Jake finally discovers the truth: a nutria ate poison and then Pappy drank its milk, causing his death. However, Jake accidentally reveals that he got the DNA results and Charles discovers his true heritage, which devastates him. Jake also deduces that Sam had hidden Pappy's will as he was jealous of Charles delivering the eulogy at the funeral. Jake and Terry then suggest to Charles that while he may not be a biological Boyle, he could be the one true Boyle. Terry brings him the jar of dough and Charles is able to get it open; he is declared "the one true Boyle" by his relatives. Terry reveals to Jake that he'd tried to secretly loosen the lid but had been unable to, meaning Charles accomplished the feat on his own.

Meanwhile, Holt (Andre Braugher) states that his therapy sessions are not going anywhere and Kevin is pressuring him to reduce his work hours so Rosa (Stephanie Beatriz) suggests that he start dating, secretly believing that he will realize how good he has it with Kevin when he sees the low quality of other available men. To Amy's (Melissa Fumero) surprise, Holt decides to do it and sets up a date with a man named Todd. Rosa and Amy accompany Holt to Shaw's bar to monitor his date with Todd and are surprised to see him enjoying himself. But Holt reveals that he knew their plan and played along, dismissing Todd out of hand. But the next day, he confesses to Amy and Rosa that his "victory" over them was meaningless without someone to share it with. Just then, Kevin (Marc Evan Jackson) calls his name from outside in the rain and Holt joins him. They proclaim their love for each other and kiss.

== Production ==
=== Development ===
In August 2021, it was announced that the seventh episode of the season would be titled "Game of Boyles" and that co-producer Paul Welsh and co-producer Madeline Walter would serve as writers while Thembi Banks would direct. Despite being the seventh episode of the season to air, it was the sixth to be produced.

== Reception ==
=== Viewers ===
According to Nielsen Media Research, the episode was seen by an estimated 1.84 million household viewers and gained a 0.4 ratings share among adults aged 18–49. This means that 0.4 percent of all households with televisions watched the episode. This was a 26% increase over the previous episode, which was watched by 1.45 million viewers and a 0.3 ratings share. With these ratings, Brooklyn Nine-Nine was the highest rated show on NBC for the night, fourth on its timeslot and fourth for the night, behind CMA Jam, Big Brother, and Thursday Night Football.

=== Critical reviews ===
"Game of Boyles" received mixed reviews from critics. Vikram Murthi of The A.V. Club gave the episode a "C+" rating, writing, "Forgettable from snout to anus, 'The Game of Boyles' is more dull than actively bad. Nevertheless, it stands as the weakest episode of the season so far."

Brian Tallerico of Vulture gave the episode a 2 star rating out of 5 and wrote, "The worst episode so far of the final season of Brooklyn Nine-Nine, 'Game of Boyles' centers the extremely unusual extended Boyle family, a joke that worked best when it had Chelsea Peretti's withering glare to counter its extreme affability, and hasn't really since she left. Is the final season really not going to include another heist? No sign of The Vulture? And yet here we've gotten another adventure for the over-emotional Boyle clan, and not even one that really feels like it has anything interesting to say thematically. It feels more like a script that didn't make it through the writers' room in a previous season, pulled out of the bottom drawer and dusted off for this one."

Nick Harley of Den of Geek wrote, "'Game of Boyles' is first and serves as a pseudo-parody of Knives Out. The problem here is that by this point, the film is almost two years old, and the parody feels stale. Also feeling stale are the Boyle family jokes."
