= Maggie Carey =

American filmmaker (born c.1974/75)

- Born: c. 1974 or 1975 (age 51–52)
- Education: University of Montana (BA); University of Texas at Austin (MFA)
- Occupations: Film director; screenwriter; producer; actress
- Years active: 2001–present
- Spouse: Bill Hader (m. 2006; div. 2018)
- Children: 3
Association football career
- Position: Defender
College career
Years	Team	Apps	(Gls)
1994–1996	Montana Lady Griz	26	(1)

Maggie Carey (born c. 1974/1975) is an actress, film director, screenwriter and producer. She has directed comedy shorts for television, and wrote and directed the 2013 film The To Do List.

== Early life and education ==
Carey was raised in Boise, Idaho. She attended Jackson Elementary and West Junior High and graduated from Borah High School in 1993.

Of her high school experience, Carey said, "I was in every AP class possible. I played a ton of sports. I was in student council. I was an all-American soccer player." Carey was also a lifeguard at the Borah pool, an experience that would influence her film The To-Do List.

Carey attended the University of Idaho for a year, before being recruited to the University of Montana to play Division I soccer in the team's inaugural season. She was co-captain of the team, making 26 appearances as a defender and scoring one goal. She graduated from Montana with a bachelor's degree in English literature. In a 2013 interview, Carey said she visited Austin with a Montana improv troupe for the Big Stinkin' International Improv & Sketch Comedy Festival while she was looking at film schools. Carey went on to earn an MFA degree in film production from the University of Texas at Austin.

== Career ==
In 2007, Carey and Liz Cackowski created an online series called The Jeannie Tate Show.

Carey was a member of New York's Upright Citizens Brigade improvisation troupe. Carey performed with both the Upright Citizens Brigade Theatre in New York and Improv Olympics West in Los Angeles.

In 2011, Carey cowrote and directed sketches for four episodes of Funny or Die Presents called "Lady Refs" about female referees working youth soccer games. Carey wrote and directed the low budget sex comedy, The To Do List, which was released in 2013; the film is set in her home state of Idaho in 1993, featuring a lead character who is the same age as Carey was then.

== Personal life ==
Carey married actor Bill Hader in 2006. They had met in Los Angeles, California, through a friend of Carey's from college. They have three daughters together.

Hader and Carey separated in 2017. Hader filed for divorce in December of that year. They reached a divorce settlement in March 2018 and the divorce was finalized three months later.

== Filmography ==
Short film

Year	Title	Director	Writer	Producer
2001	Ladyporn	Yes	Yes	Yes
2002	Dance Club	Yes	Yes	Yes
2002	Sun River Homestead	Yes	Yes	Yes
2004	Soap Scum	Yes	Yes	Yes
2005	Jenny Clone	Yes	Yes	Yes
2006	Head in the Oven	Yes	Yes	Yes
2007	The Jeannie Tate Show	Yes	Yes	Yes
2007	Suburban Bravery	Yes	No	No

Feature film

Year	Title	Director	Writer	Producer
2013	The To Do List	Yes	Yes	Yes

Television

Year	Title	Notes
2011	Funny or Die Presents	4 episodes (Also writer and producer)
2014	Silicon Valley	Episode "Fiduciary Duties"
2016–2017	Love	Episodes "The Date", "While You Were Sleeping" and "Shrooms"
2016–2021	Brooklyn Nine-Nine	Episodes "Adrian Pimento", "Moo Moo", "Show Me Going", "The Set Up"
2016–2019	Unbreakable Kimmy Schmidt	Episodes "Kimmy Walks Into a Bar!", "Kimmy Finds a Liar!"
2017–2018	The Last Man on Earth	Episodes "Point Person Knows Best" and "Señor Clean"
2017	Great News	Episode "A Christmas Carol Wendelson"
2018–2019	A.P. Bio	Episodes "Rosemary's Boyfriend" and "Toledo's Top 100"
2018	Barry	Episode "Chapter Four: Commit... to YOU"
2018	Champions	Episode "Matt Bomer Poster"
2018	I Feel Bad	Episode "My Kid Has to Grow Up"
2018	Single Parents	Episode "They Call Me DOCTOR Biscuits!"
2018	Sunnyside	Episode "Mondale"
2020	Mixed-ish	Episode "It's Tricky"
2021–2022	Mr. Mayor	Episodes "Dodger Day", "Move Fast and Break Things" and "Mayor Daddy"
2021–2022	Never Have I Ever	Episodes "... ruined someone's life", "...been slut-shamed" and "...had my own troll"
2021	The Sex Lives of College Girls	Episode "The Surprise Party"
2023	Twisted Metal	Episodes "WHZDARE" and "DRVTHRU"
2024	The Girls on the Bus	Episode "Two Americas"
2025	You	Episode "Last Dance"
2026	The Fall and Rise of Reggie Dinkins	Episode "Mischief and Memories"
2026	Adults	Episode "Talia"

=== As actress ===
- Rejected Pitches (2013) as Kathryn Bigelow (2 episodes)
- Cinema Six (2012) as Tina
- Human Giant (2008) as Jason's Mother
- Jenny Clone (2005) as Jenny
- Dance Club (2002) as Gloria
- Vacancy (2002) as Woman
- Occam's Razor: The Great Dialogues of Mindy (2001) as Brenda Gibson

== See also ==
- List of female film and television directors
