= Evan Susser =

American screenwriter and producer (born 1985)

- Born: Evan Daniel Susser; December 1, 1985 (age 40); Washington, D.C., U.S.
- Education: Washington University in St. Louis
- Occupations: Screenwriter; television producer
- Years active: 2008 – present
- Spouse: Jamie Hanley Susser (m. 2014)

Evan Daniel Susser (born December 1, 1985) is an American comedy writer and television producer. He was the co-writer of the film Fist Fight. He also was a writer and producer for the NBC primetime series Brooklyn Nine-Nine.

== Personal life ==
Susser is Jewish. He married Jamie Rebecca Hanley in 2014.

== Filmography ==
=== Fist Fight ===
Susser wrote the 2017 feature film Fist Fight with co-writers Max Greenfield and Van Robichaux.

=== Wedding Crashers 2 ===
Susser is writing the upcoming sequel to Wedding Crashers, Wedding Crashers 2, with writing partner Van Robichaux.

=== Brooklyn Nine-Nine ===
- 7.06: "Trying"
- 8.04: "Balancing"

== Podcasting ==
Susser is a frequent on-air contributor to the Doughboys podcast, and the host of The Deli Boys with fellow Brooklyn Nine-Nine writer David Phillips.
