= Van Robichaux =

American screenwriter and producer

- Born: John Vance Robichaux, III; May 8, 1984 (age 42); New Orleans, LA, U.S.
- Education: Washington University in St. Louis
- Occupations: Screenwriter; television producer
- Years active: 2008–present

John Vance Robichaux, III (born May 8, 1984) is an American comedy writer and television producer. He was the co-writer of the film Fist Fight. He was a writer and producer for the NBC primetime series Brooklyn Nine-Nine. He is also involved in labor issues and was nominated for the Writers Guild of America, West Board of Directors in 2022

== Personal life ==
Robichaux studied engineering at Washington University in St. Louis, before ultimately becoming a screenwriter.

== Filmography ==
=== Fist Fight ===
Robichaux wrote the 2017 feature film Fist Fight with co-writers Max Greenfield and Evan Susser.

=== Wedding Crashers 2 ===
Robichaux is writing the upcoming sequel to Wedding Crashers, Wedding Crashers 2, with writing partner Evan Susser.

=== Brooklyn Nine-Nine ===
- 7.06: "Trying"
- 8.04: "Balancing"
