= Fist Fight =

2017 film by Richie Keen

- Theatrical release poster
- Directed by: Richie Keen
- Screenplay by: Van Robichaux; Evan Susser
- Story by: Van Robichaux; Evan Susser; Max Greenfield
- Produced by: Shawn Levy; Max Greenfield; John Rickard; Dan Cohen
- Starring: Ice Cube; Charlie Day; Tracy Morgan; Jillian Bell; Dean Norris; Christina Hendricks; Kumail Nanjiani; Dennis Haysbert; JoAnna Garcia Swisher; Alexa Nisenson; Stephnie Weir; Kym Whitley
- Cinematography: Eric Alan Edwards
- Edited by: Matthew Freund
- Music by: Dominic Lewis
- Production companies: New Line Cinema; Village Roadshow Pictures; 21 Laps Entertainment; Wrigley Pictures; RatPac-Dune Entertainment
- Distributed by: Warner Bros. Pictures
- Release dates: February 13, 2017 (Regency Village Theater); February 17, 2017 (United States)
- Running time: 90 minutes
- Country: United States
- Language: English
- Budget: $22–25 million
- Box office: $41.1 million

Fist Fight is a 2017 American comedy film directed by Richie Keen and written by Van Robichaux and Evan Susser. The film stars Ice Cube, Charlie Day, Tracy Morgan, and Jillian Bell with Dean Norris, Christina Hendricks, Kumail Nanjiani, and Dennis Haysbert in supporting roles. The film centers on a school teacher who is challenged to an after-school fistfight after causing another teacher's termination.

The film premiered in Los Angeles on February 13, 2017, and was theatrically released in the United States on February 17, 2017 by Warner Bros. Pictures. It grossed $41.1 million worldwide against a $22–25 million budget and received negative reviews from critics. It was released on DVD and Blu-ray on May 30, 2017.

== Plot ==
On the last day before summer vacation, students devise an elaborate senior prank day, and faculty members try to survive the chaos as best they can. Meanwhile, English teacher Andy Campbell hears rumors of the downsizing of all departments. As he has a pregnant wife and a child, he becomes extremely anxious.

When history teacher Ron Strickland later asks Campbell for help with operating a VCR in a class, a student named Neil secretly uses his smartphone to prank Strickland. Enraged, he grabs a fire axe and destroys Neil's desk, sending the class fleeing the room in panic.

Both Campbell and Strickland are brought to Principal Tyler's office to discuss the incident. Despite initially agreeing to keep what happened a secret, Campbell tells the truth after Tyler threatens to fire them both if neither steps forward. Strickland loses his job, leading him to challenge Campbell to a fist fight after school.

Convinced that he does not stand a chance against Strickland, Campbell tries to set matters straight. He bribes Neil into giving false testimony to Principal Tyler to clear Strickland's name. The plan works, and Strickland gets reinstated.

Campbell and Strickland receive an emergency call from school counselor Holly. They meet with her, not realizing she tricked them into coming there to talk through their issues. When Campbell tells Strickland that he got him his job back, he is further enraged. Stating that Campbell should have told him about this plan before acting, he insists the fight is still on.

Campbell calls 9-1-1 for help, but after learning the reason for his call, the operator laughs and hangs up on him. Then, after seeking advice from both Holly and Coach Crawford, he resolves to have Strickland removed from the campus before the day's end. As a last resort, Campbell threatens Neil into giving him MDMA, which he plants in Strickland's satchel. He calls the police, hoping to have Strickland arrested, but the attempt is botched and both teachers are incarcerated.

They share a cell with other inmates, and Campbell secretly tricks an enormous one into giving Strickland a beating, but only when signaled. He then returns to Strickland, who decides to call the fight off after the hellish day they have had. The inmate nonetheless attacks Strickland, who easily knocks him out. Upon realizing Campbell was behind it, Strickland declares the fight back on. They are then released after the police discover the drug used to frame Strickland was only aspirin.

Campbell heads back to meet up with the school board, Tyler, and Superintendent Johnson but learns that his colleagues have all been fired. He is one of the few to remain in his position. However, he stands his ground and voices his complaints about the public school system not receiving the support it truly needs. He heads over to his daughter Ally's talent show, where her rendition of Big Sean's "I Don't Fuck with You" inspires him to finally stand up to Strickland.

In the school parking lot, Campbell and Strickland engage in a frenzied fight that is dragged throughout the school. Strickland dominates the fight early on, however Campbell gains the upper hand and seemingly knocks him out with a fire extinguisher. As he celebrates his victory prematurely, Strickland reappears and knocks him out with a single punch, ending the fight.

During this time, Strickland answers Campbell's phone and learns that his wife Maggie is in labor. Showing mercy on Campbell, Strickland drives him to the hospital, thus ending their feud.

That summer, Tyler arrives at the Campbells' to tell Campbell that the publicity and public outcry the fight generated has forced the Department of Education to put more effort and money into their schools, so he must rehire Campbell and Strickland. Campbell accepts on the condition that the rest of his colleagues be reinstated as well.

As the new school year begins, the faculty return to their respective positions. Campbell and Strickland, now best friends, are ready to enforce learning with Campbell being much more assertive towards the students.

In a post-credits scene, Crawford is seen flirting with the 911 operator in person. After rapping for her, he realizes he does not know her name.

== Cast ==
- Charlie Day as Andrew "Andy"/"Light Roast" Campbell, the main protagonist, a mild-mannered English teacher.
- Ice Cube as Ronald "Ron" Strickland, a tough and hot-headed history teacher and Campbell's colleague.
- Tracy Morgan as Coach Crawford, a comical gym teacher.
- Jillian Bell as Miss Holly, a lecherous guidance counselor under the influence of various vices.
- Christina Hendricks as Ms. Monet, an intense drama teacher who wants Strickland to beat Campbell.
- Kumail Nanjiani as Officer Mehar, the school security guard who dislikes profanity.
- Dean Norris as Richard Tyler, the disgruntled and pompous principal of the Roosevelt High School.
- Austin Zajur as Neil, a mischievous student at Roosevelt High School.
- Dennis Haysbert as Superintendent Johnson, the superintendent of the school district that Roosevelt High School is in.
- JoAnna Garcia Swisher as Maggie Campbell, the devoted, loving and pregnant wife of Andy.
- Alexa Nisenson as Ally Campbell, Andy and Maggie's daughter
- Kym Whitley as 911 Operator
- Max Carver as Daniel
- Charlie Carver as Nathaniel
- Stephnie Weir as Suzie
- Madison Bailey as High Schooler (uncredited)

== Production ==
In December 2013, it was announced that New Line Cinema was developing Fist Fight, a comedy from writers Van Robichaux and Evan Susser. On June 9, 2015, Ice Cube and Charlie Day were cast in the film, which 21 Laps Entertainment produced, along with its Shawn Levy, as well as Billy Rosenberg and Max Greenfield. On July 10, Richie Keen was confirmed to direct the film, while Dan Cohen was set to also produce. On September 15, 2015, Jillian Bell and Dean Norris were also cast in the film, and on September 21, 2015, Tracy Morgan, JoAnna Garcia, and Dennis Haysbert joined the cast. On September 25, 2015, Christina Hendricks was added to the cast, and Kym Whitley was later confirmed to appear.

Principal photography on the film began on September 28, 2015, in Atlanta, Georgia, and ended on November 23, 2015.

=== Home media ===
Fist Fight was released on Digital HD on May 16, 2017, followed by a DVD and Blu-ray on May 30, 2017.

== Reception ==
=== Box office ===
Fist Fight grossed $32.2 million in the United States and Canada and $8.9 million in other territories, for a worldwide total of $41.1 million.

In North America, the film opened on February 17, 2017, alongside A Cure for Wellness and The Great Wall, and was initially projected to gross $15–20 million from 3,184 theaters in its opening weekend. After grossing $600,000 from Thursday night previews and $3.8 million on its first day, projections were lowered to $10–12 million. The film went on to open to $12.2 million, finishing 5th at the box office.

=== Critical response ===
On Rotten Tomatoes, the film has an approval rating of 25% based on 134 reviews and an average rating of 4.10/10. The site's critical consensus reads, "Fist Fight boasts a surplus of comedic muscle but flails lazily, and far too few of its jokes land with enough force to register." On Metacritic, the film has a score of 37 out of 100 based on 28 critics, indicating "generally unfavorable" reviews. Audiences polled by CinemaScore gave the film an average grade of "B" on an A+ to F scale.

Writing for RogerEbert.com, Glenn Kenny gave the film 3 out of 4 stars, saying: "Fist Fight stands up, at least a little bit, for storytelling". In contrast, Richard Roeper gave the film zero out of four stars and wrote that he disliked the film enough to wish for a technical malfunction to disrupt the showing. British film critic Mark Kermode called it "Shoddily written, screechingly performed, crude, crass, endurance-testing... It's utter, utter, utter rubbish."

== See also ==
- Three O'Clock High
