= List of Brooklyn Nine-Nine episodes =

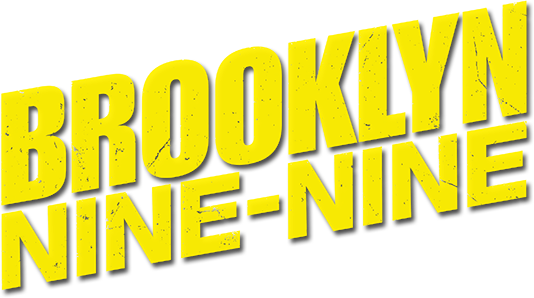
The logo of the series

Brooklyn Nine-Nine is an American police procedural comedy television series which ran for five seasons on Fox and three on NBC. It was created by Dan Goor and Michael Schur. It follows a team of detectives and a police captain in the 99th Precinct of the New York City Police Department in Brooklyn.

The series stars Andy Samberg, Andre Braugher, Stephanie Beatriz, Terry Crews, Melissa Fumero, Joe Lo Truglio, and Chelsea Peretti. Peretti departed the series in the fourth episode of the sixth season. The following episode, Dirk Blocker and Joel McKinnon Miller, who had previously recurred, were promoted to series regulars.

Over the course of its run, Brooklyn Nine-Nine aired 153 episodes. The series was ordered by Fox in May 2013. The first season aired on Fox from September 17, 2013, through March 25, 2014. Before the conclusion of the first season Fox ordered a second season. The season aired from September 28 through May 17, 2015. During the course of the second season it was renewed for a third season, which began airing on September 27 and ended on April 19, 2016. In March 2016, the series was renewed for another season. The fourth season began airing on September 20 and concluded on May 23, 2017. In May 2017, the series was renewed for a fifth season. The fifth season began airing on September 26 and concluded on May 20, 2018.

On May 13, Fox canceled the series; the following day, NBC picked up the series. The sixth season began on January 10, 2019, and concluded on May 16. NBC renewed it for a seventh season in February 2019. Three months later NBC gave a ten-episode final season order. The seventh season began on February 6, 2020, and ended on April 23. The eighth and final season aired from August 12, 2021, through September 16.

== Series overview ==
Series overview
Season	Episodes	Originally released			Rank	Total viewers (in millions inc. DVR)
Season	Episodes	First released	Last released	Network	Rank	Total viewers (in millions inc. DVR)
1	22	September 17, 2013	March 25, 2014	Fox	98	4.80
2	23	September 28, 2014	May 17, 2015	Fox	113	4.87
3	23	September 27, 2015	April 19, 2016	Fox	118	3.98
4	22	September 20, 2016	May 23, 2017	Fox	137	2.87
5	22	September 26, 2017	May 20, 2018	Fox	161	2.71
6	18	January 10, 2019	May 16, 2019	NBC	138	3.11
7	13	February 6, 2020	April 23, 2020	NBC	105	2.69
8	10	August 12, 2021	September 16, 2021	NBC	—N/a	—N/a

== Episodes ==
=== Season 1 (2013–14) ===
Season one was initially given a 14-episode order in May 2013. The series was picked up for a full season of 22 episodes in October. It aired from September 17 through March 25, 2014.

Season 1 episodes
No. overall	No. in season	Title	Directed by	Written by	Original release date	Prod. code	U.S. viewers (millions)
1	1	"Pilot"	Phil Lord & Christopher Miller	Dan Goor & Michael Schur	September 17, 2013	101	6.17
2	2	"The Tagger"	Craig Zisk	Norm Hiscock	September 24, 2013	102	4.03
3	3	"The Slump"	Julie Anne Robinson	Prentice Penny	October 1, 2013	105	3.43
4	4	"M.E. Time"	Troy Miller	Gil Ozeri	October 8, 2013	106	3.34
5	5	"The Vulture"	Jason Ensler	Laura McCreary	October 15, 2013	104	3.43
6	6	"Halloween"	Dean Holland	Lesley Arfin	October 22, 2013	107	3.77
7	7	"48 Hours"	Peter Lauer	Luke Del Tredici	November 5, 2013	103	3.84
8	8	"Old School"	Beth McCarthy-Miller	Gabe Liedman	November 12, 2013	109	3.26
9	9	"Sal's Pizza"	Craig Zisk	Lakshmi Sundaram	November 19, 2013	108	3.36
10	10	"Thanksgiving"	Jorma Taccone	Luke Del Tredici	November 26, 2013	110	3.69
11	11	"Christmas"	Jake Szymanski	Dan Goor	December 3, 2013	111	3.66
12	12	"Pontiac Bandit"	Craig Zisk	Norm Hiscock & Lakshmi Sundaram	January 7, 2014	113	3.44
13	13	"The Bet"	Julian Farino	Laura McCreary	January 14, 2014	112	3.53
14	14	"The Ebony Falcon"	Michael Blieden	Prentice Penny	January 21, 2014	114	4.55
15	15	"Operation: Broken Feather"	Julie Anne Robinson	Dan Goor & Michael Schur	February 2, 2014	116	15.07
16	16	"The Party"	Michael Engler	Gil Ozeri & Gabe Liedman	February 4, 2014	115	3.22
17	17	"Full Boyle"	Craig Zisk	Norm Hiscock	February 11, 2014	117	2.88
18	18	"The Apartment"	Tucker Gates	David Quandt	February 25, 2014	118	2.66
19	19	"Tactical Village"	Fred Goss	Luke Del Tredici	March 4, 2014	119	2.61
20	20	"Fancy Brudgom"	Victor Nelli, Jr.	Laura McCreary	March 11, 2014	120	2.49
21	21	"Unsolvable"	Ken Whittingham	Prentice Penny	March 18, 2014	121	2.50
22	22	"Charges and Specs"	Akiva Schaffer	Gabe Liedman & Gil Ozeri	March 25, 2014	122	2.59

=== Season 2 (2014–15) ===
The second season aired from September 28, 2014, through May 17, 2015.

Season 2 episodes
No. overall	No. in season	Title	Directed by	Written by	Original release date	Prod. code	U.S. viewers (millions)
23	1	"Undercover"	Dean Holland	Luke Del Tredici	September 28, 2014	201	5.46
24	2	"Chocolate Milk"	Fred Goss	Gabe Liedman	October 5, 2014	202	3.31
25	3	"The Jimmy Jab Games"	Rebecca Asher	Lakshmi Sundaram	October 12, 2014	203	4.51
26	4	"Halloween II"	Eric Appel	Prentice Penny	October 19, 2014	204	5.22
27	5	"The Mole"	Victor Nelli, Jr.	Laura McCreary	November 2, 2014	205	3.41
28	6	"Jake and Sophia"	Michael McDonald	Tricia McAlpin & David Phillips	November 9, 2014	206	3.99
29	7	"Lockdown"	Linda Mendoza	Luke Del Tredici	November 16, 2014	208	4.53
30	8	"USPIS"	Ken Whittingham	Brian Reich	November 23, 2014	207	3.04
31	9	"The Road Trip"	Beth McCarthy-Miller	Brigitte Munoz-Liebowitz	November 30, 2014	209	3.11
32	10	"The Pontiac Bandit Returns"	Max Winkler	Matt O'Brien	December 7, 2014	210	4.32
33	11	"Stakeout"	Tristram Shapeero	Laura McCreary & Tricia McAlpin	December 14, 2014	211	3.52
34	12	"Beach House"	Tim Kirkby	Lakshmi Sundaram & David Phillips	January 4, 2015	212	6.12
35	13	"Payback"	Victor Nelli, Jr.	Norm Hiscock & Brigitte Munoz-Liebowitz	January 11, 2015	213	3.29
36	14	"The Defense Rests"	Jamie Babbit	Prentice Penny & Matt O'Brien	January 25, 2015	214	2.79
37	15	"Windbreaker City"	Craig Zisk	Gabe Liedman	February 8, 2015	215	2.59
38	16	"The Wednesday Incident"	Claire Scanlon	Laura McCreary	February 15, 2015	216	2.08
39	17	"Boyle-Linetti Wedding"	Dean Holland	Matt O'Brien	March 1, 2015	217	3.61
40	18	"Captain Peralta"	Eric Appel	Dan Goor	March 8, 2015	218	3.11
41	19	"Sabotage"	Jay Karas	Brian Reich	March 15, 2015	219	2.96
42	20	"AC/DC"	Linda Mendoza	Kylie Condon	April 26, 2015	222	2.78
43	21	"Det. Dave Majors"	Michael McDonald	Gabe Liedman & Lakshmi Sundaram	May 3, 2015	220	2.72
44	22	"The Chopper"	Phil Traill	Tricia McAlpin & David Phillips	May 10, 2015	221	2.56
45	23	"Johnny and Dora"	Dean Holland	Luke Del Tredici	May 17, 2015	223	2.35

=== Season 3 (2015–16) ===
Season three began airing on September 27, 2015, and ended on April 19, 2016.

Season 3 episodes
No. overall	No. in season	Title	Directed by	Written by	Original release date	Prod. code	U.S. viewers (millions)
46	1	"New Captain"	Michael Schur	Matt Murray	September 27, 2015	301	3.14
47	2	"The Funeral"	Claire Scanlon	Luke Del Tredici	October 4, 2015	302	4.10
48	3	"Boyle's Hunch"	Trent O'Donnell	Tricia McAlpin	October 11, 2015	304	2.75
49	4	"The Oolong Slayer"	Michael McDonald	Gabe Liedman	October 18, 2015	303	2.57
50	5	"Halloween III"	Michael McDonald	David Phillips	October 25, 2015	305	4.38
51	6	"Into the Woods"	Linda Mendoza	Andrew Guest	November 8, 2015	306	2.65
52	7	"The Mattress"	Dean Holland	Laura McCreary	November 15, 2015	307	2.69
53	8	"Ava"	Tristram Shapeero	Matt O'Brien	November 22, 2015	308	3.88
54	9	"The Swedes"	Eric Appel	Matt Murray	December 6, 2015	309	3.95
55	10	"Yippie Kayak"	Rebecca Asher	Lakshmi Sundaram	December 13, 2015	310	3.82
56	11	"Hostage Situation"	Max Winkler	Phil Augusta Jackson	January 5, 2016	312	2.73
57	12	"9 Days"	Dean Holland	Justin Noble	January 19, 2016	311	2.37
58	13	"The Cruise"	Michael Spiller	Tricia McAlpin	January 26, 2016	313	2.38
59	14	"Karen Peralta"	Bruce McCulloch	Alison Agosti & Gabe Liedman	February 2, 2016	314	2.24
60	15	"The 9-8"	Nisha Ganatra	David Phillips	February 9, 2016	315	2.28
61	16	"House Mouses"	Claire Scanlon	Andrew Guest	February 16, 2016	316	2.18
62	17	"Adrian Pimento"	Maggie Carey	Luke Del Tredici	February 23, 2016	317	2.13
63	18	"Cheddar"	Alex Reid	Jessica Polonsky	March 1, 2016	318	1.85
64	19	"Terry Kitties"	Michael McDonald	Phil Augusta Jackson & Tricia McAlpin	March 15, 2016	319	1.95
65	20	"Paranoia"	Payman Benz	Gabe Liedman	March 29, 2016	320	2.02
66	21	"Maximum Security"	Victor Nelli, Jr.	Laura McCreary	April 5, 2016	321	2.71
67	22	"Bureau"	Ryan Case	David Phillips & Alison Agosti	April 12, 2016	322	2.07
68	23	"Greg and Larry"	Dan Goor	Andrew Guest & Phil Augusta Jackson	April 19, 2016	323	2.02

=== Season 4 (2016–17) ===
The fourth season began airing on September 20, 2016, and concluded on May 23, 2017.

Season 4 episodes
No. overall	No. in season	Title	Directed by	Written by	Original release date	Prod. code	U.S. viewers (millions)
69	1	"Coral Palms: Part 1"	Michael McDonald	Dan Goor	September 20, 2016	401	2.39
70	2	"Coral Palms: Part 2"	Trent O'Donnell	Tricia McAlpin	September 27, 2016	402	2.34
71	3	"Coral Palms: Part 3"	Payman Benz	Justin Noble	October 4, 2016	403	2.40
72	4	"The Night Shift"	Tristram Shapeero	Matt Murray	October 11, 2016	404	2.13
73	5	"Halloween IV"	Claire Scanlon	Phil Augusta Jackson	October 18, 2016	405	2.05
74	6	"Monster in the Closet"	Nisha Ganatra	Andrew Guest	November 15, 2016	407	2.18
75	7	"Mr. Santiago"	Alex Reid	Neil Campbell	November 22, 2016	408	2.19
76	8	"Skyfire Cycle"	Michael McDonald	David Phillips	November 29, 2016	406	2.34
77	9	"The Overmining"	Dean Holland	Luke Del Tredici	December 6, 2016	409	2.31
78	10	"Captain Latvia"	Jaffar Mahmood	Matt Lawton	December 13, 2016	410	2.15
79	11	"The Fugitive"	Rebecca Asher	Carol Kolb	January 1, 2017	411	3.49
80	12	"The Fugitive"	Ryan Case	Justin Noble & Jessica Polonsky	January 1, 2017	412	3.49
81	13	"The Audit"	Beth McCarthy Miller	Carly Hallam Tosh	April 11, 2017	413	1.91
82	14	"Serve & Protect"	Michael Schur	Andrew Guest & Alexis Wilkinson	April 18, 2017	414	1.91
83	15	"The Last Ride"	Linda Mendoza	David Phillips	April 25, 2017	415	1.88
84	16	"Moo Moo"	Maggie Carey	Phil Augusta Jackson	May 2, 2017	418	1.72
85	17	"Cop-Con"	Giovani Lampassi	Andy Gosche	May 9, 2017	416	1.79
86	18	"Chasing Amy"	Luke Del Tredici	Matt Lawton	May 9, 2017	417	1.44
87	19	"Your Honor"	Michael McDonald	David Phillips & Carly Hallam Tosh	May 16, 2017	419	1.65
88	20	"The Slaughterhouse"	Victor Nelli Jr.	Neil Campbell	May 16, 2017	420	1.38
89	21	"The Bank Job"	Matthew Nodella	Carol Kolb	May 23, 2017	421	1.78
90	22	"Crime and Punishment"	Dan Goor	Justin Noble & Jessica Polonsky	May 23, 2017	422	1.50

=== Season 5 (2017−18) ===
The fifth season began airing on September 26 and concluded on May 20, 2018. The season was the final one to air on Fox.

Season 5 episode
No. overall	No. in season	Title	Directed by	Written by	Original release date	Prod. code	U.S. viewers (millions)
91	1	"The Big House: Part 1"	Tristram Shapeero	Luke Del Tredici	September 26, 2017	501	2.00
92	2	"The Big House: Part 2"	Michael McDonald	Justin Noble	October 3, 2017	502	1.74
93	3	"Kicks"	Eric Appel	Andrew Guest	October 10, 2017	503	1.68
94	4	"HalloVeen"	Jamie Babbit	Dan Goor	October 17, 2017	504	1.69
95	5	"Bad Beat"	Kat Coiro	Carol Kolb	November 7, 2017	505	1.50
96	6	"The Venue"	Cortney Carrillo	Matt Lawton	November 14, 2017	506	1.65
97	7	"Two Turkeys"	Alex Reid	David Phillips	November 21, 2017	507	1.66
98	8	"Return to Skyfire"	Linda Mendoza	Neil Campbell	November 28, 2017	508	1.73
99	9	"99"	Payman Benz	Andy Bobrow	December 5, 2017	509	1.94
100	10	"Game Night"	Tristram Shapeero	Justin Noble & Carly Hallam Tosh	December 12, 2017	510	1.93
101	11	"The Favor"	Victor Nelli Jr.	Aeysha Carr	December 12, 2017	511	1.68
102	12	"Safe House"	Nisha Ganatra	Andy Gosche	March 18, 2018	512	1.92
103	13	"The Negotiation"	Linda Mendoza	Phil Augusta Jackson	March 25, 2018	513	1.83
104	14	"The Box"	Claire Scanlon	Luke Del Tredici	April 1, 2018	516	1.78
105	15	"The Puzzle Master"	Akiva Schaffer	Lang Fisher	April 8, 2018	514	1.74
106	16	"NutriBoom"	Trent O'Donnell	David Phillips	April 15, 2018	515	1.79
107	17	"DFW"	Jaffar Mahmood	Jeff Topolski	April 15, 2018	518	1.48
108	18	"Gray Star Mutual"	Giovani Lampassi	Jessica Polonsky	April 22, 2018	517	1.77
109	19	"Bachelor/ette Party"	Beth McCarthy-Miller	Carly Hallam Tosh	April 29, 2018	519	1.97
110	20	"Show Me Going"	Maggie Carey	Phil Augusta Jackson	May 6, 2018	520	1.67
111	21	"White Whale"	Matthew Nodella	Matt Lawton & Carol Kolb	May 13, 2018	521	1.75
112	22	"Jake & Amy"	Dan Goor	Dan Goor & Luke Del Tredici	May 20, 2018	522	1.79

=== Season 6 (2019) ===
Season six was the first season to air on NBC following its cancellation on Fox. NBC gave the season a 13 episode order, later ordering an additional five. The sixth season began on January 10, 2019, and concluded on May 16.

Season 6 episodes
No. overall	No. in season	Title	Directed by	Written by	Original release date	Prod. code	U.S. viewers (millions)
113	1	"Honeymoon"	Giovani Lampassi	Neil Campbell	January 10, 2019	601	3.54
114	2	"Hitchcock & Scully"	Cortney Carrillo	Lang Fisher	January 17, 2019	602	2.83
115	3	"The Tattler"	Jennifer Arnold	David Phillips	January 24, 2019	603	2.75
116	4	"Four Movements"	Luke Del Tredici	Phil Augusta Jackson	January 31, 2019	604	2.72
117	5	"A Tale of Two Bandits"	Cortney Carrillo	Luke Del Tredici	February 7, 2019	605	3.04
118	6	"The Crime Scene"	Michael McDonald	Justin Noble	February 14, 2019	606	2.56
119	7	"The Honeypot"	Phil Augusta Jackson	Carol Kolb	February 21, 2019	607	2.35
120	8	"He Said, She Said"	Stephanie Beatriz	Lang Fisher	February 28, 2019	609	2.36
121	9	"The Golden Child"	Claire Scanlon	Neil Campbell	March 7, 2019	610	1.99
122	10	"Gintars"	Linda Mendoza	Andy Gosche	March 14, 2019	611	2.05
123	11	"The Therapist"	Rebecca Addelman	Jeff Topolski	March 21, 2019	608	2.13
124	12	"Casecation"	Beth McCarthy-Miller	Luke Del Tredici	April 11, 2019	612	1.88
125	13	"The Bimbo"	Joe Lo Truglio	Paul Welsh & Madeline Walter	April 18, 2019	613	1.78
126	14	"Ticking Clocks"	Payman Benz	Carol Kolb	April 25, 2019	615	1.69
127	15	"Return of the King"	Melissa Fumero	Phil Augusta Jackson	May 2, 2019	614	1.65
128	16	"Cinco de Mayo"	Rebecca Asher	David Phillips	May 9, 2019	616	1.83
129	17	"Sicko"	Matthew Nodella	Justin Noble	May 16, 2019	617	1.63
130	18	"Suicide Squad"	Dan Goor	Dan Goor & Luke Del Tredici	May 16, 2019	618	1.55

=== Season 7 (2020) ===
The seventh season began airing on February 6, 2020, and ended on April 23.

Season 7 episodes
No. overall	No. in season	Title	Directed by	Written by	Original release date	Prod. code	U.S. viewers (millions)
131	1	"Manhunter"	Cortney Carrillo	David Phillips	February 6, 2020	701	2.66
132	2	"Captain Kim"	Luke Del Tredici	Carol Kolb	February 6, 2020	702	1.99
133	3	"Pimemento"	Michael McDonald	Justin Noble	February 13, 2020	703	1.79
134	4	"The Jimmy Jab Games II"	Neil Campbell	Vanessa Ramos	February 20, 2020	704	1.85
135	5	"Debbie"	Claire Scanlon	Marcy Jarreau	February 27, 2020	705	1.74
136	6	"Trying"	Kim Nguyen	Evan Susser & Van Robichaux	March 5, 2020	706	1.82
137	7	"Ding Dong"	Claire Scanlon	Jess Dweck	March 12, 2020	707	2.12
138	8	"The Takeback"	Michael McDonald	Dewayne Perkins	March 19, 2020	708	2.32
139	9	"Dillman"	Kyra Sedgwick	Paul Welsh & Madeline Walter	March 26, 2020	709	2.14
140	10	"Admiral Peralta"	Linda Mendoza	Neil Campbell	April 2, 2020	710	2.06
141	11	"Valloweaster"	Matthew Nodella	Luke Del Tredici & Jeff Topolski	April 9, 2020	711	2.04
142	12	"Ransom"	Rebecca Asher	Nick Perdue & Beau Rawlins	April 16, 2020	712	2.05
143	13	"Lights Out"	Dan Goor	Dan Goor & Luke Del Tredici	April 23, 2020	713	2.24

=== Season 8 (2021) ===
The season was set to air in late 2020 but was delayed due to COVID-19 restrictions. The eighth and final season aired two episodes a week from August 12, 2021, through September 16.

Season 8 episodes
No. overall	No. in season	Title	Directed by	Written by	Original release date	Prod. code	U.S. viewers (millions)
144	1	"The Good Ones"	Cortney Carrillo	David Phillips & Dewayne Perkins	August 12, 2021	802	1.84
145	2	"The Lake House"	Kevin Bray	Neil Campbell & Marcy Jarreau	August 12, 2021	801	1.34
146	3	"Blue Flu"	Claire Scanlon	Carol Kolb & April Quioh	August 19, 2021	803	2.02
147	4	"Balancing"	Daniella Eisman	Evan Susser & Van Robichaux	August 19, 2021	804	1.49
148	5	"PB & J"	Gail Mancuso	Lamar Woods & Jeff Topolski	August 26, 2021	808	1.90
149	6	"The Set Up"	Maggie Carey	Jess Dweck & Nick Perdue	August 26, 2021	805	1.45
150	7	"Game of Boyles"	Thembi Banks	Paul Welsh & Madeline Walter	September 2, 2021	806	1.84
151	8	"Renewal"	Beth McCarthy Miller	Stephanie A. Ritter & Beau Rawlins	September 2, 2021	807	1.31
152	9	"The Last Day"	Linda Mendoza	Luke Del Tredici & Audrey E. Goodman	September 16, 2021	809	1.88
153	10	"The Last Day"	Claire Scanlon	Dan Goor	September 16, 2021	810	1.88

== Ratings ==
=== Season 1–4 ===
Brooklyn Nine-Nine : U.S. viewers per episode (millions)

Season	Episode number																							Average
Season	1	2	3	4	5	6	7	8	9	10	11	12	13	14	15	16	17	18	19	20	21	22	23	Average
1	6.17	4.03	3.43	3.34	3.43	3.77	3.84	3.26	3.36	3.69	3.66	3.44	3.53	4.55	15.07	3.22	2.88	2.66	2.61	2.49	2.50	2.59	–	3.98
2	5.46	3.31	4.51	5.22	3.41	3.99	4.53	3.04	3.11	4.32	3.52	6.12	3.29	2.79	2.59	2.08	3.61	3.11	2.96	2.78	2.72	2.56	2.35	3.54
3	3.14	4.10	2.75	2.57	4.38	2.65	2.69	3.88	3.95	3.82	2.73	2.37	2.38	2.24	2.28	2.18	2.13	1.85	1.95	2.02	2.71	2.07	2.02	2.73
4	2.39	2.34	2.40	2.13	2.05	2.18	2.19	2.34	2.31	2.15	3.49	3.49	1.91	1.91	1.88	1.72	1.61	1.61	1.65	1.38	1.78	1.50	–	2.11

Audience measurement performed by Nielsen Media Research

=== Season 5–8 ===
Brooklyn Nine-Nine : U.S. viewers per episode (millions)

Season	Episode number																						Average
Season	1	2	3	4	5	6	7	8	9	10	11	12	13	14	15	16	17	18	19	20	21	22	Average
5	2.00	1.74	1.68	1.69	1.50	1.65	1.66	1.73	1.94	1.81	1.81	1.92	1.83	1.78	1.74	1.79	1.48	1.77	1.97	1.67	1.75	1.79	1.76
6	3.54	2.83	2.75	2.72	3.04	2.56	2.35	2.36	1.99	2.05	2.13	1.88	1.78	1.69	1.65	1.83	1.63	1.55	–				2.24
7	2.66	1.99	1.79	1.85	1.74	1.82	2.12	2.32	2.14	2.06	2.04	2.05	2.24	–									2.07
8	1.84	1.34	2.01	1.48	1.90	1.45	1.84	1.31	1.88	1.88	–												1.70

Audience measurement performed by Nielsen Media Research

== Webisodes ==
=== Detective Skills with Hitchcock and Scully ===
Detective Skills with Hitchcock and Scully are a series of webisodes that were released alongside the third season. They star Dirk Blocker and Joel McKinnon Miller as Michael Hitchcock and Norm Scully respectively.

No.	Title	Original release date	Length
1	"Preparing for the Stakeout"	August 15, 2015	1:51
2	"How to Stay Awake During a Stakeout"	September 6, 2015	1:07
3	"Processing the Perp"	September 14, 2015	2:05
