= Brooklyn Nine-Nine season 1 =

Brooklyn Nine-Nine
- Season 1
- DVD cover
- Starring: Andy Samberg; Stephanie Beatriz; Terry Crews; Melissa Fumero; Joe Lo Truglio; Chelsea Peretti; Andre Braugher
- No. of episodes: 22

Release
- Original network: Fox
- Original release: September 17, 2013 – March 25, 2014

Season chronology
- Next → Season 2

The first season of the television sitcom Brooklyn Nine-Nine premiered September 17, 2013 on Fox and concluded March 25, 2014 with 22 episodes. The season stars Andy Samberg as childish but skilled detective Jake Peralta.

== Summary ==
Raymond Holt becomes the captain of the NYPD's fictional 99th precinct and almost immediately clashes with Jake Peralta, who's as immature as he is skilled at solving crimes. Despite their clashing personalities in their work approach, both learn to tolerate and respect each other while solving crimes, and establish the precinct's annual Halloween heist in the process. Jake's partner, Amy Santiago, repeatedly tries to ingratiate herself with Holt, as she's a fan of his work. Jake and Amy have an ongoing bet over who can get the most felonies, which ultimately ends with Jake winning. He takes Amy on a fake date but starts to develop actual feelings for her in the process.

Jake's friend, Charles Boyle, struggles in his romantic life as he has a crush on fellow Detective Rosa Diaz, who does not reciprocate his feelings. He is awarded with a Medal of Valor after he is shot in the buttocks while protecting Rosa from a criminal with a grudge against Holt. At a party thrown by Holt and his husband, Kevin, he enters a relationship with a food author named Vivian Ludley and becomes engaged to her, but the two break up when Charles refuses to move to Canada with her. Meanwhile, Sergeant Terry Jeffords struggles to return to the field after the birth of his twin daughters, but eventually overcomes his fears.

Amy begins dating her old boyfriend Teddy Wells, much to Jake's jealousy. Jake eventually uncovers a large conspiracy while investigating a civic leader with Amy and Holt's help, forcing him to go undercover for the FBI to investigate. Before he leaves, Jake confesses his feelings to Amy. Charles is shocked to find that after Jake's departure, he (Charles) slept with the precinct's sardonic civilian administrator, Gina Linetti.

== Cast ==
=== Main ===
- Andy Samberg as Detective Jake Peralta
- Stephanie Beatriz as Detective Rosa Diaz
- Terry Crews as Sergeant Terry Jeffords
- Melissa Fumero as Detective Amy Santiago
- Joe Lo Truglio as Detective Charles Boyle
- Chelsea Peretti as Gina Linetti
- Andre Braugher as Captain Raymond Holt

=== Recurring ===
- Dirk Blocker as Detective Michael Hitchcock
- Joel McKinnon Miller as Detective Norm Scully
- Marilu Henner as Vivian Ludley

=== Guest ===
- Pete Davidson as Steven
- Mary Elizabeth Ellis as Dr. Rossi
- Dean Winters as Detective Keith "The Vulture" Pembroke
- Patton Oswalt as Fire Marshall Boone
- Craig Robinson as Doug Judy
- Marc Evan Jackson as Kevin Cozner
- Kyle Bornheimer as Detective Teddy Wells
- James M. Connor as Deputy Commissioner Podolski
- Andy Richter as Doorman
- Jerry Minor as Jerry Grundhaven
- Joey Diaz as Sal
- Michael G. Hagerty as Captain McGinley
- Fred Armisen as Mlep(clay)nos
- Stacy Keach as Jimmy Brogan
- Kid Cudi as Dustin Whitman
- Adam Sandler as himself
- Joe Theismann as himself

== Episodes ==
Season 1 episodes
No. overall	No. in season	Title	Directed by	Written by	Original release date	Prod. code	U.S. viewers (millions)
1	1	"Pilot"	Phil Lord & Christopher Miller	Dan Goor & Michael Schur	September 17, 2013	101	6.17
The 99th precinct of the New York Police Department in Brooklyn receives a new Commanding Officer, Captain Raymond Holt. Much to the dismay of talented but carefree Detective Jacob Peralta, and the satisfaction of the by-the-book Detective Amy Santiago, Holt takes police work much more seriously than the previous captain. Holt gets to know his detectives through Sergeant Terry Jeffords, their dedicated but emotionally unsteady leader. Meanwhile, Detective Charles Boyle, a committed but not physically gifted officer, asks Gina Linetti, the sarcastic civilian administrator, to help him ask laconic and tough Detective Rosa Diaz out on a date. Jake gets on Holt's nerves by refusing to take his orders, like wearing a neck tie, seriously.
2	2	"The Tagger"	Craig Zisk	Norm Hiscock	September 24, 2013	102	4.03
Jake shows up late for roll call, so Holt assigns him to a graffiti case that Jake thinks is below him. The case becomes a problem when the suspect happens to be the Deputy Commissioner's son. In the meantime, Gina's psychic friend visits the precinct and gets into Charles' head about Rosa.
3	3	"The Slump"	Julie Anne Robinson	Prentice Penny	October 1, 2013	105	3.43
Jake has a lot of unsolved cases on hand and the other detectives are unwilling to let his losing streak rub off on them. Meanwhile, Amy recruits Rosa and Gina for help when Holt asks her to run lead on the Junior Policeman Program for at-risk youth and Boyle helps Jeffords with a special case he's unable to solve.
4	4	"M.E. Time"	Troy Miller	Gil Ozeri	October 8, 2013	106	3.34
Jake flirts with an attractive medical examiner at a crime scene and delays the autopsy report, only to learn that she's more than he bargained for. In the meantime, the sketch artist is out sick when Amy takes on a purse-snatching case, but she discovers that Jeffords has hidden artistic talents. Amy tries to determine why Holt is in a bad mood.
5	5	"The Vulture"	Jason Ensler	Laura McCreary	October 15, 2013	104	3.43
A detective from Special Crimes known as "The Vulture" takes over a murder case that Jake is close to solving and steals his thunder, so Jake enlists the precinct to get revenge and find the murder weapon before "The Vulture" does. Meanwhile, Holt and Gina help Terry regain his rights to carry a gun.
6	6	"Halloween"	Dean Holland	Lesley Arfin	October 22, 2013	107	3.77
On Halloween night, a busy time of the year for any precinct, Amy, who hates the holiday, is not happy that she has to wear a costume to go undercover on the street with Charles. Meanwhile, at the precinct, Jake bets Holt that he can steal his Medal of Valor before midnight, which leads to him bringing out his own costumes. Jake says that if he can steal the medal Holt must declare that he is an amazing detective/genius and do all of Jake's Halloween paperwork, but that if he can't steal the medal he will work for several weekends without overtime pay. Jake wins the bet with the help of the other detectives.
7	7	"48 Hours"	Peter Lauer	Luke Del Tredici	November 5, 2013	103	3.84
Jake has 48 hours to collect evidence on an arrest he made without much proof, or the "perp" Dustin Whitman will go scot-free. After an unsuccessful interrogation, Captain Holt forces the squad to spend the weekend helping Jake solve the case. It is revealed that the real robber is another man who is working with Dustin using his MO and then splitting the loot. With the team stuck at the precinct, Charles judges a pie contest between Gina and Rosa.
8	8	"Old School"	Beth McCarthy-Miller	Gabe Liedman	November 12, 2013	109	3.26
Jake spends a day with a former crime-reporter whom he respects, but finds out that remarks about the precinct were considered on the record. Terry and Charles work with Rosa to help her appearance on the witness stand.
9	9	"Sal's Pizza"	Craig Zisk	Lakshmi Sundaram	November 19, 2013	108	3.36
Jake tries to catch an arsonist who destroyed his favorite pizzeria while feuding with the stubborn Fire Marshall Boone. Amy gets jealous when she learns Rosa was asked to be the new police captain at another precinct. Terry and Gina hold interviews for a new IT worker when a hacker leaks everyone's internet searches out to the entire precinct.
10	10	"Thanksgiving"	Jorma Taccone	Luke Del Tredici	November 26, 2013	110	3.69
Amy hosts a Thanksgiving dinner at her apartment for everyone at the precinct, with the primary purpose of asking Holt to be her mentor, but he and Jake leave early to catch a perp who stole money out of the evidence locker. Everyone else detests Amy's cooking and end up in one mishap after another, leaving Terry in a hunger-induced rage, Rosa to relish the chaos, and Boyle scrambling to save the night.
11	11	"Christmas"	Jake Szymanski	Dan Goor	December 3, 2013	111	3.66
When Holt receives a number of death threats, Jake is elated when he is assigned by the chief to be Holt's protection detail, allowing Jake to monitor Holt and boss him around. Amy tries to make the perfect Christmas card to give to Holt with Gina's help. Terry sees a therapist for a psych evaluation so he can go back into the field.
12	12	"Pontiac Bandit"	Craig Zisk	Norm Hiscock & Lakshmi Sundaram	January 7, 2014	113	3.44
Jake and Rosa try to catch an infamous car thief with the help of a perp and supposed witness, Doug Judy, who turns out to be the Pontiac Bandit. Holt tries to find a home for two puppies. The rest of the precinct struggles to accommodate an injured Charles when he returns from being wounded in action. Boyle decides to return home until he is better and takes the dogs in to keep him company.
13	13	"The Bet"	Julian Farino	Laura McCreary	January 14, 2014	112	3.53
Jake plans the "worst date ever" for Amy after pulling a last minute victory over her to settle their bet, but when they are called to a stakeout during their date, he reevaluates his relationship with her. After injuring himself further during his Medal of Valor ceremony, an increased dose of pain medication causes Charles to drop painfully honest "truth bombs" about his co-workers. He is also jealous when a police horse named Peanut Butter, who is receiving the same medal as him, gets more attention than him. Holt tries to save face with Terry's wife regarding Terry going back in the field only to have his foot in his mouth.
14	14	"The Ebony Falcon"	Michael Blieden	Prentice Penny	January 21, 2014	114	4.55
While investigating a steroid traffic operation in a gym, Peralta and Boyle recruit Sergeant Jeffords, formerly nicknamed "The Ebony Falcon," in order to infiltrate the organization and detain the responsibles. Meanwhile, Captain Holt orders Santiago and Diaz to research about a theft Gina suffered at her home.
15	15	"Operation: Broken Feather"	Julie Anne Robinson	Dan Goor & Michael Schur	February 2, 2014	116	15.07
Jake and Amy investigate hotel robberies. There, Jake is upset to discover Amy might leave to join the major crimes division. Meanwhile, Holt and Terry conduct experiments to reduce inefficiencies in the precinct in order to reach their CompStat deadline.
16	16	"The Party"	Michael Engler	Gil Ozeri & Gabe Liedman	February 4, 2014	115	3.22
The entire squad is invited to Captain Holt's birthday party, where Terry struggles to keep everyone in line. Jake tries to make a great first impression with Holt's husband Kevin, as does Amy with Holt, but with disastrous results. Boyle's love of food leads him to make a new romantic connection with an older woman named Vivian, while Rosa unleashes Gina onto a group of abnormal psychologists who find her fascinating.
17	17	"Full Boyle"	Craig Zisk	Norm Hiscock	February 11, 2014	117	2.88
Boyle's tendency to go way overboard and become extremely clingy with his love interests (which Peralta calls "Full Boyle") has him calling on Jake to act as a buffer on his next date with Vivian. Little does he know that Vivian is about to go Full Boyle on him. Sergeant Jeffords pulls a drug case from Rosa and Amy and gives it to Scully and Hitchcock, because the ladies chose to dismiss a geeky, wannabe superhero named Super Dan who nonetheless had useful information. Meanwhile, Holt faces a challenge for his position as president of a black LGBT police organization which he started 25 years ago.
18	18	"The Apartment"	Tucker Gates	David Quandt	February 25, 2014	118	2.66
Peralta learns that his grandmother's apartment where he has been living is going "co-op", and he would have to pay nearly a half million dollars to keep living there. He goes to a loan shark for a down payment, before Gina convinces him to search for a new apartment instead. Holt starts collecting self-evaluations from the detectives, leading to much stress among the department, especially for Santiago. Boyle and Rosa take revenge on an un-hygienic co-worker who uses Rosa's desk on a different shift.
19	19	"Tactical Village"	Fred Goss	Luke Del Tredici	March 4, 2014	119	2.61
The squad heads to the "Tactical Village" where they and other precincts run paintball simulations and test new equipment. Peralta gets jealous when Santiago runs into her old boyfriend Teddy, Rosa gets angry when Boyle doesn't invite her to his wedding, and Gina and Holt struggle with "Kwazy Kupcakes".
20	20	"Fancy Brudgom"	Victor Nelli, Jr.	Laura McCreary	March 11, 2014	120	2.49
Boyle makes Peralta his best man, which means cake tasting, picking stationery, and helping Charles convince Vivian that he doesn't want to relocate to Canada. Meanwhile Gina, Amy, and the Sergeant attempt a team diet plan, and Holt makes Rosa apologize to a patrol officer whom she humiliated.
21	21	"Unsolvable"	Ken Whittingham	Prentice Penny	March 18, 2014	121	2.50
When Jake is allowed the weekend off because of a hot streak in solving cases, he decides to take on an 8-year old cold case that everyone believes is unsolvable. With the help of Sgt. Terry, the two try to crack the case once and for all and, thanks to Jake pulling an all-nighter he finally solves the case by working out that the supposed murder victim isn't even dead. Meanwhile, Amy plans a romantic trip with new boyfriend Teddy, but an unexpected event with Captain Holt jeopardizes it. Gina and Rosa let a downtrodden Charles in on one of the best-kept secrets of the precinct, their secret bathroom named Babylon, demanding he be silent about it. But Scully and Hitchcock do some of their best detective work ever to figure out what Charles is hiding.
22	22	"Charges and Specs"	Akiva Schaffer	Gabe Liedman & Gil Ozeri	March 25, 2014	122	2.59
Jake's investigation of philanthropic civic leader Lucas Wint is shut down by Commissioner Podolski, resulting in a likely suspension for Jake. Still determined to crack the case, Jake enlists an unnaturally rebellious Amy and a reluctant Captain Holt to help him uncover more evidence, but Holt uncovers a larger conspiracy that will require a greater sacrifice from Jake in order to solve the case. Jake finally tells Amy he has feelings for her, leaving her conflicted. Meanwhile, Charles is devastated over breaking up with Vivian, and Rosa and Terry try to cheer him up. Gina incorporates emoji into her everyday speech.

== Reception ==
=== Critical response ===
The first season received mostly positive reviews, with many praising the cast, setting, and humor, although the Boyle-Rosa storyline throughout the season was criticized. The review aggregator website Rotten Tomatoes reports an 89% approval rating, with an average score of 7.32/10, based on 57 reviews. The website's consensus reads, "Led by the surprisingly effective pairing of Andy Samberg and Andre Braugher, Brooklyn Nine-Nine is a charming, intelligently written take on the cop show format." Metacritic gave the first season of the show a weighted average rating of 70/100 based on 33 reviews, indicating "generally favorable" reviews.

=== Awards and nominations ===
Award	Date of ceremony	Category	Recipients and nominees	Result
People's Choice Awards	January 8, 2014	Favorite Actor In a New TV Series	Andy Samberg	Nominated
Golden Globe Awards	January 12, 2014	Best Actor – Television Series Musical or Comedy	Andy Samberg	Won
Golden Globe Awards	January 12, 2014	Best Television Series – Musical or Comedy	Brooklyn Nine-Nine	Won
NAACP Image Award	February 22, 2014	Outstanding Actor in a Comedy Series	Andre Braugher	Nominated
Satellite Awards	February 23, 2014	Best Actor – Television Series Musical or Comedy	Andre Braugher	Nominated
Satellite Awards	February 23, 2014	Best Television Series, Comedy or Musical	Brooklyn Nine-Nine	Nominated
GLAAD Media Awards	April 12, 2014	Outstanding Comedy Series	Brooklyn Nine-Nine	Nominated
American Comedy Awards	May 8, 2014	Comedy Series	Brooklyn Nine-Nine	Nominated
American Comedy Awards	May 8, 2014	Comedy Actor — TV	Andy Samberg	Won
American Comedy Awards	May 8, 2014	Comedy Supporting Actress — TV	Chelsea Peretti	Nominated
Critics' Choice Television Awards	June 19, 2014	Best Supporting Actor in a Comedy Series	Andre Braugher	Won
TCA Awards	July 19, 2014	Outstanding New Program	Brooklyn Nine-Nine	Nominated
TCA Awards	July 19, 2014	Outstanding Achievement in Comedy	Brooklyn Nine-Nine	Nominated
Imagen Awards	August 1, 2014	Best Supporting Actress – Television	Stephanie Beatriz	Nominated
Teen Choice Awards	August 10, 2014	Choice TV Actor: Comedy	Andy Samberg	Nominated
Creative Arts Emmy Awards	August 16, 2014	Outstanding Stunt Coordination for a Comedy Series or Variety Program	Brooklyn Nine-Nine	Won
EWwy Award	August 18, 2014	Best Comedy Series	Brooklyn Nine-Nine	Nominated
EWwy Award	August 18, 2014	Best Actor, Comedy	Andy Samberg	Nominated
66th Primetime Emmy Awards	August 25, 2014	Outstanding Supporting Actor in a Comedy Series	Andre Braugher	Nominated
