= Sal's Pizza (Brooklyn Nine-Nine) =

- Brooklyn Nine-Nine episode
- Episode no.: Season 1 Episode 9
- Directed by: Craig Zisk
- Written by: Lakshmi Sundaram
- Cinematography by: Giovani Lampassi
- Editing by: Sandra Montiel
- Production code: 108
- Original air date: November 19, 2013
- Running time: 22 minutes

Guest appearances
- Patton Oswalt as Fire Marshall Boone; Dirk Blocker as Michael Hitchcock; Joel McKinnon Miller as Norm Scully; Joey "Coco" Diaz as Sal

Episode chronology
← Previous "Old School"	Next → "Thanksgiving"
- Brooklyn Nine-Nine season 1

"Sal's Pizza" is the ninth episode of the first season of the American television police sitcom series Brooklyn Nine-Nine. It is the 9th overall episode of the series and is written by Lakshmi Sundaram and directed by co-executive producer Craig Zisk. It aired on Fox in the United States on November 19, 2013. It was the ninth episode to be broadcast but the eight episode to be produced.

In the episode, Jake's favorite pizzeria is destroyed in a fire and he sets out to find the culprit, but finds himself at odds with Fire Marshall Boone (Patton Oswalt). Meanwhile, the precinct's computer system is hacked, leading Holt to assign Terry and Gina to recruit a new IT specialist. The episode was seen by an estimated 3.26 million household viewers and gained a 1.4/4 ratings share among adults aged 18–49, according to Nielsen Media Research. The episode received positive reviews from critics, who praised Oswalt's performance as well as Jake's character development.

== Plot ==
In the cold open, the squad makes fun of each other when a virus prints everyone's Internet search histories.

Jake Peralta (Andy Samberg) and Charles Boyle (Joe Lo Truglio) are called to investigate after Peralta's favorite pizzeria, Sal's Pizza, is destroyed in a fire. However, Fire Marshall Boone (Patton Oswalt) refuses to let them onto the site. Jake is angry at this, and coupled with Boone suggesting that Sal (Joey Diaz) burned down his own restaurant, is determined to break protocol and investigate the incident.

As a result of the virus, Amy Santiago (Melissa Fumero) discovers that Rosa Diaz (Stephanie Beatriz) was offered a position as captain in Ropesburg, New Jersey, but declined the position; Santiago gets jealous and begins acting passive-aggressive. The precinct begins looking for a new IT person, with Terry (Terry Crews) and Gina (Chelsea Peretti) conducting interviews, but Gina's odd antics put off several interviewees. Diaz takes Santiago to New Jersey to show her the precinct and how uneventful and boring it is; on the way back to New York, she chastises Santiago for her jealousy and tells her they need to stick together as the only women in the precinct.

Peralta and Boyle interrogate Sal's competitors but fail to find a connection to the crime. They then try to sneak into the scene, but are caught by Boone and fire inspectors, which leads to a brawl. When Holt (Andre Braugher) questions Peralta over trying to solve Sal's arson, Peralta reveals that, before his father abandoned him, it was the place they went after every Little League game. This convinces Boone to share the investigation with Peralta and they find the culprit: Gino, one of the competitors who stole Sal's recipe to use in his new restaurant. Gina and Terry ultimately hire a new IT specialist: the person who hacked them in the first place.

== Reception ==
=== Viewers ===
In its original American broadcast, "Sal's Pizza" was seen by an estimated 3.36 million household viewers and gained a 1.5/4 ratings share among adults aged 18–49, according to Nielsen Media Research. This was a slight increase in viewership from the previous episode, which was watched by 3.26 million viewers with a 1.4/4 in the 18-49 demographics. This means that 1.5 percent of all households with televisions watched the episode, while 4 percent of all households watching television at that time watched it. With these ratings, Brooklyn Nine-Nine was the second most watched show on FOX for the night, beating Dads and The Mindy Project but behind New Girl, fourth on its timeslot and eleventh for the night in the 18-49 demographics, behind The Goldbergs, New Girl, The Biggest Loser, Chicago Fire, Person of Interest, Agents of S.H.I.E.L.D., NCIS: Los Angeles, David Blaine: Real or Magic, NCIS, and The Voice.

=== Critical reviews ===
"Sal's Pizza" received positive reviews from critics. Roth Cornet of IGN gave the episode a "great" 8.0 out of 10 and wrote, "Another strong episode of Brooklyn Nine-Nine as the writers continue to allow the chemistry to build amongst the support cast. The ensemble is truly what works about this series, with each cast member working to volley the jokes to the next."

Molly Eichel of The A.V. Club gave the episode a "B+" grade and wrote, "Diaz and Santiago's plot was less thrilling than the rest: Diaz is offered a job as Captain in a boring suburb, exposing Santiago’s jealous ambition. It was nicely book-ended with an overeager Santiago kowtowing to authority figure Holt and her admission that in a family of seven boys, competition was the way to success. I wasn't happy about the prospect of comedy derived from women's cattiness, but Diaz's short moment of sentimentality, that women in male-dominated fields need to stick together, worked without feeling heavy-handed or cheesy. Unlike Santiago, it didn't overstep its moment."

Alan Sepinwall of HitFix wrote, "'Sal's Pizza' was another episode that didn't quite have Jake dialed in right, but that worked anyway because the supporting characters have become so rich so quickly. So even though Jake was again being a little kid – even his motivation for chasing the arson investigation came from childhood (which did not, as I briefly suspected, turn out to be a lie to shut up Marshal Boone) – Charles' foodie habits, plus Patton Oswalt being Patton Oswalt (*), were amusing enough to carry the A-story." Aaron Channon of Paste gave the episode a 7.6 out of 10 and wrote, "If there's ever an episode such as this one where Samberg's Peralta is limited to 'You're a fireman, so you should know how to treat that burn,' there are a half dozen co-stars to back him up by crushing Magic 8-Balls with their bare hands or describing the inside of cheeks as 'thighs with tongues.' The series has come a long way in a short time from the pilot when it seemed that the series was destined to be carried entirely by Samberg and Braugher. 'Sal's Pizza,' despite its flaws, is a testament to that growth."
