= Full Boyle =

- Brooklyn Nine-Nine episode
- Episode no.: Season 1 Episode 17
- Directed by: Craig Zisk
- Written by: Norm Hiscock
- Cinematography by: Giovani Lampassi
- Editing by: Cortney Carrillo
- Production code: 117
- Original air date: February 11, 2014
- Running time: 22 minutes

Guest appearances
- Marilu Henner as Vivian Ludley; Nate Torrence as Super Dan; Dirk Blocker as Michael Hitchcock; Joel McKinnon Miller as Norm Scully; Amanda Lund as Bernice; Marque Richardson as Brian Jensen

Episode chronology
← Previous "The Party"	Next → "The Apartment"
- Brooklyn Nine-Nine season 1

"Full Boyle" is the seventeenth episode of the first season of the American television police sitcom series Brooklyn Nine-Nine. It was written by series co-creator Norm Hiscock and directed by Craig Zisk, airing on Fox in the United States on February 11, 2014.

In the episode, Charles Boyle (Joe Lo Truglio) is experiencing "Full Boyle" symptoms which causes him to over-express his personality in his relationship with Vivian Ludley (Marilu Henner). Jake fears that this could cause the relationship to end. Meanwhile, Holt organizes a meeting for a police organization he created 25 years ago, while Rosa (Stephanie Beatriz) and Amy investigate a drug case. The episode was seen by an estimated 3.22 million household viewers and gained a 1.4/4 ratings share among adults aged 18–49, according to Nielsen Media Research. The episode received mostly positive reviews from critics, who praised Joe Lo Truglio's performance and the writing.

== Plot ==
Charles Boyle (Joe Lo Truglio) has become very confident and overzealous ever since he started his relationship with Vivian Ludley (Marilu Henner), a symptom Jake Peralta (Andy Samberg) categorizes as "Full Boyle" that always ends with him breaking down when a relationship ends. Peralta and Boyle are also investigating an unlicensed cab driver who steals from customers.

In order to stop "Full Boyle", Peralta accompanies Boyle on a double date with Vivian and her friend Bernice (Amanda Lund). However, his plans are thwarted when Peralta's date shares his interests including Die Hard and the Brooklyn Nets, distracting him from helping Boyle. They leave the date, and Boyle is about to propose to Vivian until Peralta drops the ring in a street food cart fryer. After catching the cab driver, Peralta finds out that Vivian has gone "Full Boyle" and sets a date between them with Boyle proposing to her. She accepts, and they make out in the interrogation room.

Rosa Diaz (Stephanie Beatriz) and Amy Santiago (Melissa Fumero) are investigating a drug case when they are approached by a geeky, wannabe superhero named Super Dan (Nate Torrence), who wants to meet with an officer to reveal information he has, but they dismiss him due to his persona. Later, their case is handed to Michael Hitchcock (Dirk Blocker) and Norm Scully (Joel McKinnon Miller) at Terry Jeffords's (Terry Crews) behest due to their ignorance, as Super Dan had been surveilling local drug deals. The two accept that they did not act professionally, and ask Super Dan to come back to talk. Meanwhile, Holt (Andre Braugher) is set to organize a meeting for his organization, the African-American Gay and Lesbian New York City Policeman's Association (AAGLNYCPA; /əˈɡlɪnɪkpɑː/ ə-GLIN-ick-pah), which he founded 25 years prior, and is competing with Brian Jensen (Marque Richardson) to be elected president. However, at the meeting, Holt decides to forfeit the role to Jensen but threatens to impeach him if he messes it up.

== Reception ==
=== Viewers ===
In its original American broadcast, "Full Boyle" was seen by an estimated 2.88 million household viewers and gained a 1.2/3 ratings share among adults aged 18–49, according to Nielsen Media Research. This was an 11% decrease in viewership from the previous episode, which was watched by 3.22 million viewers with a 1.4/4 in the 18-49 demographics. This means that 1.2 percent of all households with televisions watched the episode, while 3 percent of all households watching television at that time watched it. With these ratings, Brooklyn Nine-Nine was the second most watched show on FOX for the night, beating Dads but behind New Girl, third on its timeslot and ninth for the night, behind a rerun of NCIS: Los Angeles, New Girl, a rerun of NCIS, and the 2014 Winter Olympics.

=== Critical reviews ===
"Full Boyle" received mostly positive reviews from critics. Roth Cornet of IGN gave the episode a "great" 8.5 out of 10 and wrote, "'Full Boyle' wasn't the most focused of the Brooklyn Nine-Nine installments, but it served-up some great character moments for one of the series' standouts."

Molly Eichel of The A.V. Club gave the episode a "B+" grade and wrote, "Even this episode was firmly set in New York, with one of its major plot points having to do with livery cabs (which are creepy as hell and I never understood why people rode in them) and one of the great New York pastimes—making fun of rube tourists. Glimpses at characters like Super Dan show that tapping into the world outside of the precinct may do Brooklyn Nine-Nine some good in future episodes."

Alan Sepinwall of HitFix wrote, "Holt's political challenge, meanwhile, continued the running gag that the captain is funny to everyone but us. But it also did a nice job, as the show has done so often this season, of dealing seriously with the challenges a gay man of Holt's age would have dealt with over his career. Andre Braugher gets to be humorously robotic as usual, Chelsea Peretti got to do another goofy dance, but – like Parks and Rec and The Office when it was good – Brooklyn manages to find shading and humanity even within fairly silly stories, which makes them feel satisfying beyond the effectiveness of the jokes."
