= The Tagger =

- Brooklyn Nine-Nine episode
- From left to right: The deputy commissioner, the tagger, and Jake Peralta
- Episode no.: Season 1 Episode 2
- Directed by: Craig Zisk
- Written by: Norm Hiscock
- Cinematography by: Giovani Lampassi
- Editing by: Sandra Montiel
- Production code: 102
- Original air date: September 24, 2013
- Running time: 22 minutes

Guest appearances
- Dirk Blocker as Michael Hitchcock; Joel McKinnon Miller as Norm Scully; James Michael Connor as Deputy Commissioner Podolski; Michael Grant as Trevor Podolski; Mike Hagerty as Captain McGintley; Artemis Pebdani as Carlene

Episode chronology
← Previous "Pilot"	Next → "The Slump"
- Brooklyn Nine-Nine season 1

"The Tagger" is the second episode of the first season of the American television police sitcom series Brooklyn Nine-Nine. It is the 2nd overall episode of the series and is written by Norm Hiscock and directed by Craig Zisk. It aired on Fox in the United States on September 24, 2013.

The show revolves around the fictitious 99th precinct of the New York Police Department in Brooklyn and the officers and detectives that work in the precinct. Jake Peralta (Andy Samberg) is an immature yet very talented detective in the precinct with an astounding record of crimes solved, putting him in a competition with fellow detective Amy Santiago (Melissa Fumero). The precinct's status changes when the Captain is retiring and a new commanding officer, Cpt. Raymond Holt (Andre Braugher) is appointed as the newest Captain. This puts a conflict between Jake and Holt for their respective methods in the field. In the episode, Captain Holt assigns Jake to a graffiti case after he arrives late to work, which he considers to be below his level. However, the case is more difficult than expected given the perpetrator's relation to a big figure. Meanwhile, Charles Boyle (Joe Lo Truglio) gets taunted by a psychic (Artemis Pebdani), who states that his love for Rosa Diaz (Stephanie Beatriz) will remain unrequited.

The episode was seen by an estimated 4.03 million household viewers and gained a 1.8/5 ratings share among adults aged 18–49, according to Nielsen Media Research. It received positive reviews, with critics praising Andy Samberg's and Joe Lo Truglio's performances in the episode.

== Plot ==
Jake arrives late to work and is confronted by Holt for his frequent misbehavior and scolded for his lack of proper work. As punishment, Holt joins Peralta on his assignment of a graffiti case where a person draws penises on police cruisers, acting as his "babysitter." Gina introduces her friend, Carlene (Artemis Pebdani), to the gang, who claims to be a psychic. Charles is told by Carlene that Rosa will never love him.

Jake and Holt set up a stakeout and pursue the tagger, managing to catch him. However, while preparing the report, Peralta discovers that the tagger is Trevor Podolski (Michael Grant), the Deputy Commissioner's son, and fears retaliation from the Deputy Commissioner if Trevor is arrested. Meanwhile, Charles, Amy and Rosa raid an apartment as part of a drug bust. Charles becomes paranoid when he finds that the psychic managed to predict many items in the apartment and wonders if Rosa truly does not love him. The psychic later tells him that if he gets up from a chair, he will receive a severe injury. Rosa then punches Charles while he is still seated, proving to him that the psychic was wrong, and encourages him to make his own destiny.

Podolski (James M. Connor) arrives at the precinct, demanding Trevor's release. He refuses to read Peralta's report and walks out of the precinct with Trevor. Jake gets counsel on the case from Holt, who pities Trevor and the fact that he can get away with anything thanks to his father's position. After receiving news from other precincts about Trevor's past crimes, Jake and Holt pull the Podolskis over and arrest Trevor. On another day, Holt holds a briefing and roll call. As it begins, Jake exits from a tent inside the briefing room. He was sleeping in it so he could arrive to work on time.

== Reception ==
=== Viewers ===
In its original American broadcast, "The Tagger" was seen by an estimated 4.03 million household viewers and gained a 1.8/5 ratings share among adults aged 18–49, according to Nielsen Media Research. This was a 35% decrease in viewership from the previous episode, which was watched by 6.17 million viewers with a 2.6/8 in the 18-49 demographics. This means that 1.8 percent of all households with televisions watched the episode, while 5 percent of all households watching television at that time watched it. With these ratings, Brooklyn Nine-Nine was the second most watched show on FOX for the night, beating Dads and The Mindy Project but behind New Girl, fourth on its timeslot and tenth for the night in the 18-49 demographics, behind New Girl, Trophy Wife, Person of Interest, Chicago Fire, NCIS: Los Angeles, The Goldbergs, NCIS, Agents of S.H.I.E.L.D., and The Voice.

=== Critical reviews ===
"The Tagger" received positive reviews from critics. Roth Cornet of IGN gave the episode a "good" 7.5 out of 10 and wrote, "Brooklyn Nine-Nine's still finding its footing, but as compared to the pilot, this week's episode served-up an equal number of smiles with a few more laughs in the mix."

Molly Eichel of The A.V. Club gave the episode a "B" grade and wrote, "The importance of 'The Tagger' is that it gives the Nine-Nine its first real villain in the form of Deputy Commissioner Podolski. He vows to keep an eye on Holt and Peralta for arresting his son. It's an interesting first villain. It's not the criminals who pose the biggest threat, but bureaucracy and authority."

Aaron Channon of Paste gave the episode a 7.5 out of 10 and wrote, "What 'The Tagger' lacked in legitimate laugh-out-loud humor — there were certainly laughs, just not enough — it made up for in rounding the pilot's caricatures into genuine and more interesting people. The series hasn't hit its stride just yet, but it's getting there, one baby step at a time."
