= The Ebony Falcon =

- Brooklyn Nine-Nine episode
- Episode no.: Season 1 Episode 14
- Directed by: Michael Blieden
- Written by: Prentice Penny
- Cinematography by: Giovani Lampassi
- Editing by: Sandra Montiel
- Production code: 114
- Original air date: January 21, 2014
- Running time: 22 minutes

Guest appearances
- Dirk Blocker as Michael Hitchcock; Joel McKinnon Miller as Norm Scully; Eddie Pepitone as Leo Sporm; Matthew Willig as Brandon Jacoby

Episode chronology
| ← Previous "The Bet" | Next → "Operation: Broken Feather" |
- Brooklyn Nine-Nine season 1

"The Ebony Falcon" is the fourteenth episode of the first season of the American television police sitcom series Brooklyn Nine-Nine. It was written by Prentice Penny and directed by Michael Blieden, airing on Fox in the United States on January 21, 2014.

In the episode, Peralta and Charles Boyle (Joe Lo Truglio) are investigating a drug trafficking operation and seek Terry Jeffords's (Terry Crews) help in the case. The episode was seen by an estimated 4.55 million household viewers and gained a 1.9/5 ratings share among adults aged 18–49, according to Nielsen Media Research. The episode received mostly positive reviews from critics, who praised Terry Crews' performance in the episode.

== Plot ==
In the cold open, the squad tries to find out if "Kelly" is Scully's wife or dog, but fail to get a conclusive answer.

While investigating a steroid trafficking operation in a gym, Jake Peralta (Andy Samberg) and Charles Boyle (Joe Lo Truglio) recruit Terry Jeffords (Terry Crews) to join them shortly after he was cleared for fieldwork. Jeffords was formerly nicknamed "The Ebony Falcon" when he did fieldwork for the precinct. The detectives aim to infiltrate the steroid trafficking organization and detain those responsible.

However, after coming to Jeffords' house and meeting his twin children, Cagney and Lacey, Jake becomes concerned with Jeffords' safety and attempts to continue the case without him, even accidentally breaking his cover at the gym and compromising the mission. Jake and Charles manage to track a dealer who operates out of the gym and set up a sting. When Jeffords eventually confronts him about this in the gym's boxing ring, Jake admits he didn't want Cagney and Lacey to grow up without a father like he did. Jeffords assures Jake that he's learned to embrace his fears and that he's ready for fieldwork, and the three successfully take down the operation.

Meanwhile, Raymond Holt (Andre Braugher) orders Amy Santiago (Melissa Fumero) and Rosa Diaz (Stephanie Beatriz) to research a theft Gina Linetti (Chelsea Peretti) suffered at her apartment. After the two investigate the burglary at her apartment and don't come up with any leads, Gina constantly belittles them, sending an official civilian report to Holt and even hiring a private investigator. Holt deduces that Gina's behavior is out of fear, leading Rosa and Amy to help her by updating her apartment's security system and ultimately making her feel safer.

== Reception ==
=== Viewers ===
In its original American broadcast, "The Ebony Falcon" was seen by an estimated 4.55 million household viewers and gained a 1.9/5 ratings share among adults aged 18–49, according to Nielsen Media Research. This was a 28% increase in viewership from the previous episode, which was watched by 3.53 million viewers with a 1.4/4 in the 18-49 demographics. This means that 1.9 percent of all households with televisions watched the episode, while 5 percent of all households watching television at that time watched it. With these ratings, Brooklyn Nine-Nine was the most watched show on FOX for the night, beating New Girl, Dads and The Mindy Project, third on its timeslot and third for the night in the 18-49 demographics, behind a rerun NCIS, and The Biggest Loser.

=== Critical reviews ===
"The Ebony Falcon" received mostly positive reviews from critics. Roth Cornet of IGN gave the episode a "great" 8.5 out of 10 and wrote, "Brooklyn Nine-Nine's 'Ebony Falcon' brought two often underutilized members of the ensemble into focus. The fear-based A and B storylines paralleled one another nicely, and it was good to see more from both Jeffords and Gina than we ordinarily do. One hopes that the series will continue to flesh out the support characters as it goes along. Though it might be nice to return to the essential Holt-Peralta dynamic in a fresh, new way in the weeks to come."

Alasdair Wilkins of The A.V. Club gave the episode a "B" grade and wrote, "Indeed, 'The Ebony Falcon' tries to dig deeper into Peralta's abandonment issues, with at best moderate success. Brooklyn Nine-Nine is playing the long game with this particular bit of backstory, so it's not surprising that the story only vaguely touches on the underlying reasons for Jake’s sudden protectiveness. It's just that the connection between Jake's sudden concern for Cagney and Lacey’s father and his own personal trauma is something that we are told about without ever quite being shown. I'm generally a fan of Andy Samberg's performance, particularly how he infuses Jake with his specific brand of off-kilter goofiness, but he's not quite at the point where he can sell such a big emotional revelation in just a handful of lines. That’s the kind of problem that should be solved simply with more time in the role, so when Brooklyn Nine-Nine really digs into this story sometime later — perhaps in its now all but assured second season—I suspect Samberg will be up to the task."

Alan Sepinwall of HitFix wrote, "The previous episodes had done a good job of pairing Peralta with a lot of different characters: most often Santiago or Boyle, but Diaz or Holt enough to make an impression. The one cop he hadn’t been teamed with yet was Terry, in part because Terry began the series on the sidelines, dealing with his fear issues. That’s a funny idea for a big, imposing guy like Terry Crews to play, but it also kept one of the show’s funniest performers out of the orbit of its central character."
