= Thanksgiving (Brooklyn Nine-Nine) =

- Brooklyn Nine-Nine episode
- Episode no.: Season 1 Episode 10
- Directed by: Jorma Taccone
- Written by: Luke Del Tredici
- Cinematography by: Giovani Lampassi
- Editing by: Sandra Montiel
- Production code: 110
- Original air date: November 26, 2013
- Running time: 22 minutes

Guest appearances
- Dirk Blocker as Michael Hitchcock; Joel McKinnon Miller as Norm Scully; Kevin Dorff as Hank; Michael Marc Friedman as Donny

Episode chronology
← Previous "Sal's Pizza"	Next → "Christmas"
- Brooklyn Nine-Nine season 1

"Thanksgiving" is the tenth episode of the first season of the American television police sitcom series Brooklyn Nine-Nine. It was written by co-executive producer Luke Del Tredici and directed by Jorma Taccone, airing on Fox in the United States on November 26, 2013.

Amy prepares a Thanksgiving dinner for the precinct in an attempt to ask Holt to be her mentor. Jake continually mocks her attempt, as he hates Thanksgiving due to his familial issues, and he and Holt leave the dinner in order to investigate a robbery in the evidence locker. Santiago's dinner is a disaster due to her terrible cooking skills, and Charles Boyle tries desperately to save the evening. The episode was seen by an estimated 3.69 million household viewers and gained a 1.5/4 ratings share among adults aged 18–49, according to Nielsen Media Research. The episode received mostly positive reviews from critics, who praised Samberg's, Braugher's and Crews's performances.

== Plot ==
In the cold open, the squad plays "Boyle Bingo", in which they filled out their cards with possible Thanksgiving scenarios for Charles Boyle (Joe Lo Truglio) such as saying 'gobble gobble gobble' and relating Thanksgiving Day trivia, with the winner receiving $100.

On Thanksgiving, Amy Santiago (Melissa Fumero) prepares dinner for the precinct at her apartment in an attempt to impress Captain Holt (Andre Braugher) and ask him to be her mentor. Jake Peralta (Andy Samberg), however, hates the holiday, and makes Holt promise that he (Jake) can take any new cases that come up, to get out of the dinner. Meanwhile, Terry has gone without food all day due to a refrigerator mishap, and by the time he arrives at dinner is desperate for food, needing 10,000 calories per day.

As Amy begins her 8-page toast, Holt is notified that someone has stolen money from the precinct's evidence locker, much to Peralta's joy, and both of them leave to investigate. Amy wants to wait for them, but an extremely agitated Terry demands they eat. However, the dinner turns sour when Amy's food tastes so terrible (due to her lack of cooking skills, such as substituting baking powder for salt in the mashed potatoes), no one can eat it.

Jake and Holt find the man who robbed the evidence locker, but discover the money is with the thief's bookie, in a crime organization operating at a Chinese casino. At Amy's apartment, no one has eaten because they have been clandestinely flushing the food down the toilet; Amy asks them to leave, but Charles, desperate to preserve Thanksgiving, takes them to Shaw's Bar. However, Amy tries to be reckless and ends up destroying a shelf, leading to them getting kicked out; they head to the precinct next. At the casino, Jake and Holt arrest the criminal gang and recover the stolen money. Jake then admits to Holt that he hates Thanksgiving because of both of his parents' absence during the holiday; Holt assures him that he needs to join the precinct, his "new family."

Holt joins the squad back at the precinct, and tells Amy that he has read her planned speech and offers her tips to improve it; she is ecstatic, as Holt is mentoring her. In the end, Boyle manages to save Thanksgiving dinner through a range of multiethnic takeout foods. Jake ends up taking Holt's advice and joining them for the feast. Jake's toast towards Holt and his coworkers leads Boyle to cry, which results in Jake winning "Boyle Bingo".

== Reception ==
=== Viewers ===
In its original American broadcast, "Thanksgiving" was seen by an estimated 3.69 million household viewers and gained a 1.5/4 ratings share among adults aged 18–49, according to Nielsen Media Research. This was a 9% increase in viewership from the previous episode, which was watched by 3.36 million viewers with a 1.5/4 in the 18-49 demographics. This means that 1.5 percent of all households with televisions watched the episode, while 4 percent of all households watching television at that time watched it. With these ratings, Brooklyn Nine-Nine was the second most watched show on FOX for the night, beating Dads and The Mindy Project but behind New Girl, fourth on its timeslot and tenth for the night in the 18-49 demographics, behind New Girl, The Biggest Loser, Chicago Fire, Person of Interest, NCIS: Los Angeles, Dancing with the Stars, Agents of S.H.I.E.L.D., The Voice, and Rudolph the Red-Nosed Reindeer.

=== Critical reviews ===
"Thanksgiving" received mostly positive reviews from critics. Roth Cornet of IGN gave the episode a "great" 8.0 out of 10 and wrote, "Holiday episodes can be tricky, and Brooklyn Nine-Nine has now successfully tackled both Halloween and Thanksgiving. If there's one thing that the freshman comedy loves to do, it's teach Peralta that he's stronger as a part of the team. This episode serves as a great reminder for both that character and the viewer that as appealing as the individual players are, this group really shines when its working as a unit."

Molly Eichel of The A.V. Club gave the episode a "B+" grade and wrote, "Do real people hate holidays as much sitcom characters hate holidays? Thanksgiving episodes are a way to unite the cast in celebration, without the messiness and propriety of religion weighing the proceedings down — and then besiege them with disaster. So it's an interesting choice to separate out Peralta and Holt to their own storyline when the rest of the precinct gets to stay together as one unit. The structure functions to keep Peralta at the center of his own plot, allowing him to learn a lesson and reunite with the others at the end. It's a tricky prospect for a show like Brooklyn Nine-Nine, where the ensemble is so much more fun to watch than its main character. But the pairing of Peralta and Holt saves the episode from two dueling storylines, where the ensemble could overshadow the main talent."

Alan Sepinwall of HitFix wrote, "For most of this first season, I've been talking about episodes where one element didn't work, but others compensated for it, or where things didn't maybe work as a whole but individual pieces were funny enough to carry it all. 'Thanksgiving' was the first episode of the show where I didn’t have any 'Yes, but...' reactions – perhaps because I was just too busy laughing frequently in each scene. The series still has room to grow, but this was a really satisfying, really amusing early installment, easily my favorite one to date." Aaron Channon of Paste gave the episode an 8.5 out of 10 and wrote, "What results is a Thanksgiving special fully in the style and personality that Brooklyn Nine-Nine has established—loud, awkward, a little gross but very funny — while using just enough schmaltz to build the audience's love for the characters even more. Holt breaks out of his shell, Peralta learns the true meaning of Thanksgiving, Santiago receives approval from Holt, and Boyle further impresses Diaz. And, best of all, we get a great show."
