= The Vulture (Brooklyn Nine-Nine) =

- Brooklyn Nine-Nine episode
- Episode no.: Season 1 Episode 5
- Directed by: Jason Ensler
- Written by: Laura McCreary
- Cinematography by: Giovani Lampassi
- Editing by: Sandra Montiel
- Production code: 104
- Original air date: October 15, 2013
- Running time: 22 minutes

Guest appearances
- Dean Winters as Keith "The Vulture" Pembroke; Andy Richter as Doorman; Dirk Blocker as Michael Hitchcock; Joel McKinnon Miller as Norm Scully

Episode chronology
← Previous "M.E. Time"	Next → "Halloween"
- Brooklyn Nine-Nine season 1

"The Vulture" is the fifth episode of the first season of the American television police sitcom series Brooklyn Nine-Nine. It is the 5th overall episode of the series and is written by co-executive producer Laura McCreary and directed by Jason Ensler. It aired on Fox in the United States on October 15, 2013. It is the fifth episode to be broadcast but it's the fourth episode to be produced.

In this episode, the crime unit investigates a murder scene, but they are interrupted and forced to give the case to a Major Crimes detective known as "The Vulture" (Dean Winters), who always takes the credit for cases that are nearly completed. Meanwhile, Holt and Gina Linetti (Chelsea Peretti) try to help Terry Jeffords (Terry Crews) deal with his shooting problems after an incident involving a mannequin.

The episode was seen by an estimated 3.43 million household viewers and gained a 1.5/4 ratings share among adults aged 18–49, according to Nielsen Media Research. The episode received positive reviews from critics, who praised the cast's performance and the writing.

== Plot ==
In the cold open, Jake, Amy, Rosa, and Scully discuss their oldest arrests, when Boyle arrives, he misinterprets their conversation and talks about a 68-year-old he slept with in his 20s.

At the morning briefing, Jake Peralta (Andy Samberg) reports a man's murder and deduces that the victim's wife may be responsible. He decides to investigate the case alone and brushes off Amy Santiago (Melissa Fumero) and Rosa Diaz's (Stephanie Beatriz) offer to help him, instead working with Charles Boyle (Joe Lo Truglio). Meanwhile, Raymond Holt (Andre Braugher) asks Terry Jeffords (Terry Crews) for help with target shooting at a shooting range despite the fact that Terry hasn't recovered from the mannequin incident. He agrees, but discovers Gina Linetti (Chelsea Peretti) will be joining them.

Jake and Boyle interrogate many people in the building where the murder took place, but are called back to the precinct. It turns out that the case was handed to the Major Crimes Unit, and a detective named Keith Pembroke (Dean Winters) is now investigating the case. Pembroke is known as "The Vulture" for his bit of arriving in the middle of an investigation, claiming it and then taking the credit. At the shooting range, Jeffords freaks out due to Holt and Linetti's failure at shooting accuracy and shoots at the target to teach them. However, he finds that it was a ploy to make him get back to shooting so Holt could approve his return to the field, and Gina was there to act as a witness.

Peralta and the gang go to a bar where they discuss how to get revenge on the Vulture. After much consideration, they decide to investigate the murder scene and find the corkscrew used to kill the victim. They theorize that the corkscrew was a magnetic one and search the trash conduit to find it, and succeed. However, they are caught by other police officers guarding the area, and the Vulture scolds Holt for their interference with the crime scene. After being confronted by Jeffords, Jake decides to give credit to the Vulture and take all the blame to stop his behavior. Holt also learns that Jeffords managed to hit adequate shots on a target for re-certification after intimidation from Gina. Later, Peralta and Boyle send the Vulture a replica of Peralta's butt, which the Vulture had slapped throughout the episode.

== Reception ==
=== Viewers ===
In its original American broadcast, "The Vulture" was seen by an estimated 3.43 million household viewers and gained a 1.5/4 ratings share among adults aged 18–49, according to Nielsen Media Research. This was a slight increase in viewership from the previous episode, which was watched by 3.34 million viewers with a 1.5/4 in the 18-49 demographics. This means that 1.5 percent of all households with televisions watched the episode, while 4 percent of all households watching television at that time watched it. With these ratings, Brooklyn Nine-Nine was the second most watched show on FOX for the night, beating Dads and The Mindy Project but behind New Girl, fourth on its timeslot and ninth for the night in the 18-49 demographics, behind The Goldbergs, New Girl, Person of Interest, The Biggest Loser, Chicago Fire, NCIS: Los Angeles, NCIS, and Agents of S.H.I.E.L.D..

=== Critical reviews ===
"The Vulture" received positive reviews from critics. Roth Cornet of IGN gave the episode a "great" 8.0 out of 10 and wrote, "'The Vulture' is the strongest Brooklyn Nine-Nine episode to date. Funny, sharp, and a great use of the characters as a whole, let's hope that this entry is an indication of what's to come on this freshman series."

Molly Eichel of The A.V. Club gave the episode an "A−" grade and wrote, "Brooklyn Nine-Nine is not a show that's subtle about its episodic themes. 'The Vulture' is a prime example. An episode about teamwork is resolved when the team works together. It's a simple concept. The theme this week isn't best illustrated by its storyline, though. Instead, it's the actual practice that works. Peralta, Boyle, Diaz, Santiago (and Hitchcock and Scully, but, losers? Amirite?) work together to solve their case, but in the end, their ensemble creates the most satisfying episode of Brooklyn Nine-Nine in its short run so far."
