= M.E. Time =

- Brooklyn Nine-Nine episode
- Episode no.: Season 1 Episode 4
- Directed by: Troy Miller
- Written by: Gil Ozeri
- Cinematography by: Giovani Lampassi
- Editing by: Sandra Montiel
- Production code: 106
- Original air date: October 8, 2013
- Running time: 22 minutes

Guest appearances
- Mary Elizabeth Ellis as Dr. Rossi; Dirk Blocker as Michael Hitchcock; Joel McKinnon Miller as Norm Scully; Becky Thyre as Mrs. Patterson

Episode chronology
← Previous "The Slump"	Next → "The Vulture"
- Brooklyn Nine-Nine season 1

"M.E. Time" is the fourth episode of the first season of the American television police sitcom series Brooklyn Nine-Nine. It is the 4th overall episode of the series and is written by co-producer Gil Ozeri and directed by Troy Miller. It aired on Fox in the United States on October 8, 2013. It is the fourth episode to be broadcast but the sixth episode to be produced.

In this episode, Jake (Andy Samberg) flirts with an attractive medical examiner (Mary Elizabeth Ellis) at a crime scene and delays the autopsy report, only to learn that she's more than he bargained for. In the meantime, the sketch artist is out sick when Amy (Melissa Fumero) takes on a purse-snatching case, but she discovers that Jeffords (Terry Crews) has hidden artistic talents. Amy tries to determine why Holt (Andre Braugher) is in a bad mood.

The episode was seen by an estimated 3.34 million household viewers and gained a 1.5/4 ratings share among adults aged 18–49, according to Nielsen Media Research. The episode received positive reviews from critics, who praised the cast's performance, although some viewed the subplot as more interesting than the actual plot itself.

== Plot ==
In the cold open, Jake pranks Amy when she's on a dinner date with someone as he also took his date to the same restaurant.

Terry (Terry Crews) assigns Rosa (Stephanie Beatriz) and Jake as secondaries to an investigation in which Boyle (Joe Lo Truglio) leads as a primary. Amy (Melissa Fumero) warns that Jake hasn't been assigned as a secondary in a while due to his ego and could become rough and uncontrollable, due to having always led a case as a primary. In the investigation, Jake begins acting as the primary detective, asking for information, giving orders, jumping to conclusions and inserting one-liners and jokes randomly, to Rosa's dissatisfaction. Rosa confronts Jake, advising him to restrain himself and let Boyle take charge of the case, to Jake's frustration.

Meanwhile, Amy notices that Holt (Andre Braugher) is in an unusually bad mood to which Rosa and Terry do not notice since Holt does not overtly display any emotive facial expressions. Amy hopes to solve more cases to cheer Holt up. She asks Terry to draw the description of a perp who snatched a victim's purse. Holt is still unmoved, despite Terry's drawing being exactly identical with the perp they were describing, resulting in the perp being caught. Amy then asks Terry to paint a version of Holt's painting, which Holt later dismisses and throws in the garbage can. Holt claims that having a painting on a wall needed to be earned.

Dr. Rossi (Mary Elizabeth Ellis), the medical examiner, enters the crime scene, swaying Jake to flirt with her. Eventually, he has dinner with her and sleeps with her that night, delaying the autopsy report for Boyle's investigation. The next day, Jake discloses his one-night stand to Amy and Rosa, which disgusts and concerns them, as Boyle was working all night on the case. After Boyle becomes pressured by Holt to complete the investigation, Jake returns to the medical examiner's office. Rosa and Boyle head to the medical examiner's office to identify what is delaying the autopsy report, finding that Jake slept with Dr. Rossi again. Requesting the autopsy report quickly, Jake is forced to assist Dr. Rossi in dissecting the corpse, which disgusts him. They discover that the stomach contents of the corpse did show traces of poison. Boyle then arrests Mrs. Patterson. Amy eventually cheers Holt up by demonstrating that the monthly crime statistic numbers produced 'flat' numbers and explains that it was a significant improvement since when the precinct usually receives a replacement captain, the crime statistics worsen. Holt then retrieves Terry's oil painting to bring home to his husband.

== Reception ==
=== Viewers ===
In its original American broadcast, "M.E. Time" was seen by an estimated 3.34 million household viewers and gained a 1.5/4 ratings share among adults aged 18–49, according to Nielsen Media Research. This was a slight decrease in viewership from the previous episode, which was watched by 3.43 million viewers with a 1.4/4 in the 18-49 demographics. This means that 1.5 percent of all households with televisions watched the episode, while 4 percent of all households watching television at that time watched it. With these ratings, Brooklyn Nine-Nine was the second most watched show on FOX for the night, beating Dads and The Mindy Project but behind New Girl, fourth on its timeslot and eleventh for the night in the 18-49 demographics, behind The Goldbergs, Person of Interest, New Girl, Chicago Fire, NCIS: Los Angeles, NCIS, Agents of S.H.I.E.L.D., and The Voice.

=== Critical reviews ===
"M.E. Time" received positive reviews from critics. Roth Cornet of IGN gave the episode a "good" 7.0 out of 10 and wrote, "Overall, the show made some strides as Brooklyn Nine-Nine continues to find and define itself, though the jokes were not quite as strong as we ultimately hope they will be. 'M.E. Time' serves as an example of both what is working and what needs work on the series."

Molly Eichel of The A.V. Club gave the episode a "B" grade and wrote, "'M.E. Time' is the first episode where the pairings are shifted so Holt and Peralta don't work together, and I didn't think Samberg's Peralta was as strong by his lonesome. It's also the first episode where the B-story was considerably funnier than the main plot. It's Diaz who is proving the most problematic character, but that doesn't mean she's a bad character. If anything, it's a backhanded compliment to the show as a whole."

Alan Sepinwall of HitFix wrote, "The supporting cast is quickly taking shape, and though I still have issues with the central character, he made me laugh enough tonight to let his innate jerkhood slide." Aaron Channon of Paste gave the episode a 7.3 out of 10 and wrote, "'M.E. Time' showed continued growth for the off-poster characters in Santiago, Diaz, Boyle and Jeffords (who reveals his artistic side), but at the sacrifice of the Jack and Liz of Brooklyn Nine-Nine in Holt and Peralta. Adding to this problem was a humor deficit as compared to previous episodes. All that said, this is likely just a bump in the road for what will continue to be an enjoyable series."
