= The Slump =

- Brooklyn Nine-Nine episode
- Episode no.: Season 1 Episode 3
- Directed by: Julie Anne Robinson
- Written by: Prentice Penny
- Cinematography by: Giovani Lampassi
- Editing by: Cortney Carillo
- Production code: 105
- Original air date: October 1, 2013
- Running time: 21 minutes

Guest appearances
- Dirk Blocker as Michael Hitchcock; Joel McKinnon Miller as Norm Scully; Pete Davidson as Steven

Episode chronology
← Previous "The Tagger"	Next → "M.E. Time"
- Brooklyn Nine-Nine season 1

"The Slump" is the third episode of the first season of the American television police sitcom series Brooklyn Nine-Nine. It is the 3rd overall episode of the series and is written by co-producer Prentice Penny and directed by Julie Anne Robinson. It aired on Fox in the United States on October 1, 2013.

The show revolves around the fictitious 99th precinct of the New York Police Department in Brooklyn and the officers and detectives that work in the precinct. Jake Peralta (Andy Samberg) is an immature yet very talented detective in the precinct with an astounding record of crimes solved, putting him in a competition with fellow detective Amy Santiago (Melissa Fumero). The precinct's status changes when the Captain is retiring and a new commanding officer, Cpt. Raymond Holt (Andre Braugher) is appointed as the newest Captain. This puts a conflict between Jake and Holt for their respective methods in the field.

The episode was seen by an estimated 3.43 million household viewers and gained a 1.4/4 ratings share among adults aged 18–49, according to Nielsen Media Research. The episode received positive reviews from critics, who praised the cast's performance but some felt mixed about the episode's plot.

== Plot ==
In the cold open, the squad debates what the best cop movie of all time is before watching archive footage of Hitchcock being attacked and robbed by a hooker.

Jake (Andy Samberg) has a lot of unsolved cases on his plate, and the other detectives are unwilling to let his losing streak rub off on them. His case of a couple trying to find their missing grandmother gets put on hold after Jake ends up bringing in an old lady who has vision and memory problems.

To get a finished case sooner to break his "slump", Jake swaps one of his cases for a seemingly easier one from Hitchcock. However he ends up running into another dead end in the new case while the case he gave Hitchcock ended with the criminal turning himself in. On top of his slump, Jake notices general bad luck in his life going on and believes he's cursed. Holt orders Jake to digitize his unsolved cases and gives him a rabbit's foot to rub for good luck.

While organizing the files, Jake has an epiphany and figures out the couple looking for the missing grandmother are lying as they've filed missing person reports in other states and are after insurance fraud, thus ending his slump. He also figures out that Holt gave him the boring task of reorganizing the files to help lead to this, while the rabbit's foot was just a prank.

Meanwhile, Amy (Melissa Fumero) recruits Rosa (Stephanie Beatriz) for help when Holt (Andre Braugher) asks her to run lead on the Junior Policeman Program for at-risk youth. They refuse Gina's (Chelsea Peretti) help since she isn't a cop, but the two have a hard time getting through the youth and are ultimately forced to ask for Gina's assistance. Gina attempts to convey the message through an interpretive dance, but when that fails, she succeeds by informing them about a cop's salary and that they can ignore red lights and get guns.

Boyle (Joe Lo Truglio) finds Jeffords (Terry Crews) attempting to build a dollhouse for his twins' birthday. Jeffords refuses his help, wanting to build it on his own, but fails and ultimately breaks down in frustration. Boyle restructures the castle into a police-themed dollhouse.

== Reception ==
=== Viewers ===
In its original American broadcast, "The Slump" was seen by an estimated 3.43 million household viewers and gained a 1.4/4 ratings share among adults aged 18–49, according to Nielsen Media Research. This was a 15% decrease in viewership from the previous episode, which was watched by 4.03 million viewers with a 1.8/5 in the 18-49 demographics. This means that 1.4 percent of all households with televisions watched the episode, while 4 percent of all households watching television at that time watched it. With these ratings, Brooklyn Nine-Nine was the third most watched show on FOX for the night, beating Dads but behind The Mindy Project, and New Girl, fourth on its timeslot and eleventh for the night in the 18-49 demographics, behind Trophy Wife, The Mindy Project, New Girl, Person of Interest, The Goldbergs, Chicago Fire, NCIS: Los Angeles, Agents of S.H.I.E.L.D., NCIS, and The Voice.

=== Critical reviews ===
"The Slump" received positive reviews from critics. Roth Cornet of IGN gave the episode a "good" 7.7 out of 10 and wrote, "Brooklyn Nine-Nine continues to deliver laughs and tightly constructed episodes. As the weeks progress, and we get to know these characters, I find myself enjoying them, and the series, more and more. Though I will say that I hope to see a bit more in the way of in-depth character development, in as much as 'in-depth character development' is appropriate for a comedy such as this. Which is to say, it would be nice to see Peralta and crew evolve into fully fleshed out, if wacky, humans, rather than sketches acting out similar shticks week after week. Having said that, these are pretty entertaining shticks thus far! And it does take time for things to gel in a show's first season."

Molly Eichel of The A.V. Club gave the episode a "B+" grade and wrote, "Other characters are starting to become more fully-formed as well. Boyle is a divorcé, Diaz came from the streets and Santiago didn't. While Peralta may have been thrown off his game early on, the other characters are beginning to become fully-formed beyond the traits that are introduced in the pilot. I'm pumped to see them evolve even more."

Aaron Channon of Paste gave the episode a 7.9 out of 10 and wrote, "'The Slump' is Brooklyn Nine-Nine's best episode yet: The laughs finally matched the talent, and the characters are growing at a satisfying pace."
