= Chocolate Milk (Brooklyn Nine-Nine) =

- Brooklyn Nine-Nine episode
- Episode no.: Season 2 Episode 2
- Directed by: Fred Goss
- Written by: Gabe Liedman
- Cinematography by: Giovani Lampassi
- Editing by: Cortney Carrillo
- Production code: 202
- Original air date: October 5, 2014
- Running time: 22 minutes

Guest appearances
- Kyra Sedgwick as Madeline Wuntch; Moshe Kasher as Duncan Traub; Jerry Lambert as Dr. Martins; Brent Morin as Gregory Phillips

Episode chronology
← Previous "Undercover"	Next → "The Jimmy Jab Games"
- Brooklyn Nine-Nine season 2

"Chocolate Milk" is the second episode of the second season of the American television police sitcom series Brooklyn Nine-Nine. It is the 24th overall episode of the series and is written by co-executive producer Gabe Liedman and directed by Fred Goss. It aired on Fox in the United States on October 5, 2014.

The show revolves around the fictitious 99th precinct of the New York Police Department in Brooklyn and the officers and detectives that work in the precinct. Jake Peralta (Andy Samberg) is an immature yet very talented detective in the precinct with an astounding record of crimes solved, putting him in a competition with fellow detective Amy Santiago (Melissa Fumero). The precinct's status changes when the Captain is retiring and a new commanding officer, Cpt. Raymond Holt (Andre Braugher) is appointed as the newest Captain. This creates a conflict between Jake and Holt over their respective methods in the field. In the episode, Jake helps out Terry when he plans to get a vasectomy. Meanwhile, Holt finds out that there's a new Deputy Commissioner who may make his life a living hell.

The episode was seen by an estimated 3.31 million household viewers and gained a 1.6/4 ratings share among adults aged 18–49, according to Nielsen Media Research. The episode received mostly positive reviews from critics, who praised Terry Crews' performance and Sedgwick's guest performance.

== Plot ==
Jake steps in to help Terry (Terry Crews), who has a medical appointment to get a vasectomy as they attempt to solve a case involving the stabbing of a chocolate milk restaurant owner, who believes his business partner was responsible. When Jake drives to pick Terry up from New York Presbyterian, he finds that they could not perform the surgery because they did not have enough anesthesia. At home, Terry, delirious from the anesthesia, confesses that he does not want a vasectomy and makes Jake promise to stop him.

The next morning, Jake quickly becomes frustrated when Terry denies his true feelings and has already scheduled a makeup appointment later that day. He makes multiple attempts to stop him, but is physically overpowered and disappointed when Terry insists he is "a work friend, not a friend-friend." Jake decides to support Terry regardless of his decision and arrives for Terry's second appointment, also solving the case in the process as on the way over he disproved the business partner's alibi. As Terry is wheeled into surgery, however, he panics and tries to escape. Later at his home, he apologizes to Jake for how he treated him and that he will talk with his wife about it.

Captain Holt's fears about the NYPD's reorganization are realized when his old adversary Madeleine Wuntch (Kyra Sedgwick), now a Deputy Chief, shows up to conduct a critical review of the 99th's competence. Wuntch previously wanted to have intercourse with Holt, but was rejected, as Holt revealed he was gay. She has held grudges against him since then. Meanwhile, Boyle (Joe Lo Truglio) scrambles to find a date to the engagement party of his ex-wife and her boyfriend (who are also his landlords). Eventually, Rosa Diaz (Stephanie Beatriz) steps in to help him out.

== Reception ==
=== Viewers ===
In its original American broadcast, "Chocolate Milk" was seen by an estimated 3.31 million household viewers and gained a 1.6/4 ratings share among adults aged 18–49, according to Nielsen Media Research. This was a 40% decrease in viewership from the previous episode, which was watched by 5.46 million viewers with a 2.6/7 in the 18-49 demographics. This means that 1.6 percent of all households with televisions watched the episode, while 4 percent of all households watching television at that time watched it. With these ratings, Brooklyn Nine-Nine was the third most watched show on FOX for the night, beating Mulaney but behind Family Guy and The Simpsons, sixth on its timeslot and eight for the night, behind Madam Secretary, Family Guy, The Simpsons, 60 Minutes, Once Upon a Time, NFL on CBS, and NBC Sunday Night Football.

=== Critical reviews ===
"Chocolate Milk" received mostly positive reviews from critics. LaToya Ferguson of The A.V. Club gave the episode an "A−" grade and wrote, "Much like in real life, it's sort of a staple in sitcoms to have certain people realize that, despite the amount of time they may spend with each other, they're not exactly the best of friends. They may be technically close friends through family or other friends, but for some reason, they've never really had to do 'friend things' with each other. It's more than a casual friendship, and it might not even be a thing where there’s an inherent dislike or difference between the two. They're just not 'friend friends.' Call it a fact of life. The second episode of Brooklyn Nine-Nine's sophomore season not only hits that point just right, it returns the series to form in a way that was somewhat absent in the season premiere."

Jackson McHenry of Entertainment Weekly wrote, "Nobody gives lectures about intimacy in the workplace. People talk about sex — what 'Chocolate Milk' is ostensibly about, with plots that feature seduction, friends with benefits relationships, and even a vasectomy — but nobody tells you how to be friends. It's hard to be friends, when you're competitive, when you're trying keep your distance, when you don't know if a real relationship is possible. The typical workplace terms then build themselves around emotional distance: work friends, bone bros, master and student. But if you spend too much time with anyone, those labels become harder to define. And on Brooklyn Nine-Nine this week, the easy distinctions in the precinct start to dissolve, like chocolate in teat-to-mouth raw milk."

Alan Sepinwall of HitFix wrote, "There's plenty of funny stuff for the whole Brooklyn ensemble in 'Chocolate Milk,' from Gina slapping Boyle at the thought of them being 'bone bros' to Santiago's eyes going wide with terror at the realization that she just yelled at her captain, to the spectacle of Terry being high. (In addition to the spectacle of Jake clinging to Terry's ankle as Terry easily continues walking.) Solid episode all-around." Andy Crump of Paste gave the episode a 9.0 and wrote, "And Brooklyn Nine-Nine continues to show its strength as an ensemble comedy, though lingering questions remain over how the overarching stories introduced in 'Undercover' will impact the series going forward. Given how well 'Chocolate Milk' handles its pursuit of character, though, maybe those don't matter much just yet."
