= Pilot (Brooklyn Nine-Nine) =

- Brooklyn Nine-Nine episode
- Episode no.: Season 1 Episode 1
- Directed by: Phil Lord; Christopher Miller
- Written by: Dan Goor; Michael Schur
- Cinematography by: Barry Peterson
- Editing by: Ryan Case
- Production code: 101
- Original air date: September 17, 2013
- Running time: 22 minutes

Guest appearances
- Fred Armisen as Mlepnos; Joel McKinnon Miller as Norm Scully; Dirk Blocker as Michael Hitchcock; Mike Hagerty as Captain McGintley; Kevin McDonald as Disco Strangler (Ernest Zumowski) (uncredited); Anthony Azizi as Ahmed

Episode chronology
← Previous —	Next → "The Tagger"
- Brooklyn Nine-Nine season 1

"Pilot" is the first episode of the first season of the American television police sitcom series Brooklyn Nine-Nine. It is the first overall episode of the series and is written by series creators Dan Goor and Michael Schur and directed by Phil Lord and Christopher Miller. It aired on Fox in the United States on September 17, 2013.

The show revolves around the fictitious 99th precinct of the New York Police Department in Brooklyn and the officers and detectives that work in the precinct. Jake Peralta (Andy Samberg) is an immature yet very talented detective with an astounding record of crimes solved, putting him in a competition with fellow detective Amy Santiago (Melissa Fumero). The precinct's status changes when the captain retires and a new commanding officer, Cpt. Raymond Holt (Andre Braugher), is appointed. This puts a conflict between Jake and Holt due to their respective methods in the field.

The pilot was watched by 6.17 million viewers, the most watched show on Fox that day and earned positive reviews from critics, who cited the performances and the setting as highlights.

== Plot ==
NYPD detectives Jake Peralta (Andy Samberg) and Amy Santiago (Melissa Fumero) investigate a robbery at an electronics store. Despite his childish behavior, Peralta solves the crime when he discovers a teddy bear with a webcam that filmed the event. Santiago disapproves of this, saying he just got "lucky".

In the 99th precinct morning briefing, Sgt. Terry Jeffords (Terry Crews) announces the arrival of a new captain. This annoys Peralta, who had had a keen relationship with the previous captain, an irresponsible person who let him do whatever he wanted. Cpt. Raymond Holt (Andre Braugher) enters exactly when Peralta is mocking him and then makes Peralta repeat every word using the same robotic voice. He tells Peralta to begin wearing a necktie, which Peralta disapproves of. Meanwhile, Charles Boyle (Joe Lo Truglio) wants to ask Rosa Diaz (Stephanie Beatriz) on a date, but his uncertainty disrupts his plans.

Holt meets with Jeffords to be given a briefing on the precinct. He is informed about Diaz, a scary and tough detective; Boyle, a clumsy but honest and hardworking detective; Gina Linetti (Chelsea Peretti), an egomaniacal civilian administrator; Santiago, a hard-working and competitive detective; and Peralta, a childish, yet extremely talented detective. Jeffords also notifies Holt that he is on administrative leave due to an incident a year ago. Holt learns that Peralta and Santiago are competing for the most crimes solved. If Santiago wins, she will get Peralta's car; and if Peralta wins, Santiago will go on a date with him. Gina outlines the seriousness of this bet to them, and Jeffords explains how it has boosted their arrest numbers.

The detectives are working on the murder of Henry Morgenthau, a luxury food importer who was killed in his apartment. Peralta and Boyle interrogate a butcher named Ratko (Nick Gracer) who could be involved in the crime, but he escapes. Due to his actions, Peralta is assigned to the records room. There, he finds new evidence against Ratko, who usually spends time in a storage unit in Boerum Hill. The detectives arrange a raid on the storage unit. While waiting in the car, Peralta learns that Holt is gay. Ratko enters the storage facility and the team divides up to find him. They manage to catch Ratko before he escapes again. Peralta also realizes that Holt wanted him to wear a tie because it represented the feeling of being in a team.

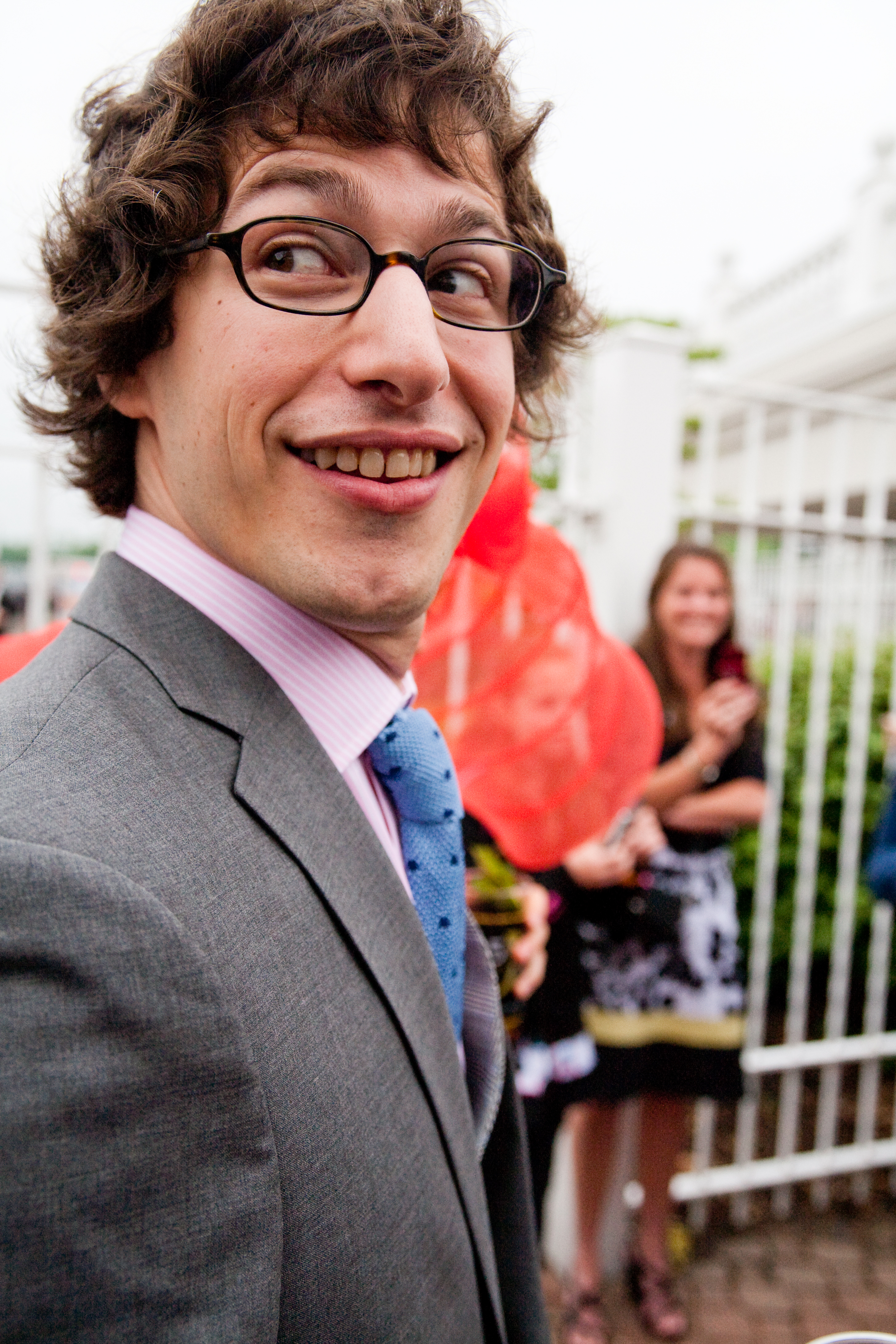
Andy Samberg stars in the series.

== Production ==
=== Development ===
On May 8, 2013, Fox placed a thirteen-episode order for the single-camera ensemble comedy. The series was picked up for a full season of 22 episodes in October 2013. Andy Samberg described the show as "It's stuff The Wire touched on a lot." Samberg took days after being offered the role to sign on, explaining, "Well, I hadn't seen a script. And I just did seven years on SNL. There was no doubt in my mind I wanted to work with Mike and Dan and that I liked the premise of the show, but if it works, it will be years of my life."

=== Filming ===
The series is filmed at CBS Studio Center in Studio City, Los Angeles. The exterior view of the fictional 99th Precinct building, complete with numerous NYPD vehicles parked in front of it, is the actual 78th Precinct building at the corner of Sixth Avenue and Bergen Street, one block south of the Barclays Center and one block east of the Bergen Street station on the New York City Subway's 2, 3, and 4 routes.

== Reception ==
=== Viewers ===
In its original American broadcast, "Pilot" was seen by an estimated 6.17 million household viewers and gained a 2.6/8 ratings share among adults aged 18–49, according to Nielsen Media Research. This means that 2.6 percent of all households with televisions watched the episode, while 8 percent of all households watching television at that time watched it. With these ratings, Brooklyn Nine-Nine was the second most watched show on FOX for the night, beating Dads and The Mindy Project but behind New Girl, first on its timeslot and second for the night in the 18-49 demographics, behind New Girl.

=== Critical reviews ===
"Pilot" received positive reviews from critics. Roth Cornet of IGN gave the episode a "good" 7.9 out of 10 and wrote, "The pedigree attached is impressive, which may create some overly elevated expectations. Brooklyn Nine-Nine, like most freshman series, is still finding its bearings. The pilot is solid, but doesn’t serve-up non-stop, laugh-out-loud, hilarity. It's possible that the show will eventually deliver weekly doses of gut-busting comedy, but for now, it's unmanifested potential. The series opener offers a strong start, with good doses of humor, and engaging and entertaining characters, though. It's certainly worth tuning in for."

Molly Eichel of The A.V. Club gave the episode a "B+" grade and wrote, "Brooklyn Nine-Nine's theme riffs on the Beastie Boys' 'Sabotage,' right before Adrock comes in with the first verse (everybody now, “I can’t stand it, I know you planned it...'). It's a nod to Spike Jonze's epic, iconic video for the song, featuring the mustachioed-out Beasties in full on homage mode to cop shows of the '70s. Brooklyn Nine-Nine takes that inherent goofiness and uses it as a tonal undercurrent."

Aaron Channon of Paste gave the episode a 7 out of 10 and wrote, "Brooklyn Nine-Nine showcases several good-to-exceptional talents in its premiere episode and manages to do so without embarrassing itself. But it will have to find its footing quickly if it is to find the success of other workplace comedies of the past decade."
