= Christmas (Brooklyn Nine-Nine) =

- Brooklyn Nine-Nine episode
- Episode no.: Season 1 Episode 11
- Directed by: Jake Szymanski
- Written by: Dan Goor
- Cinematography by: Giovani Lampassi
- Editing by: Cortney Carrillo
- Production code: 111
- Original air date: December 3, 2013
- Running time: 22 minutes

Guest appearances
- Dirk Blocker as Michael Hitchcock; Joel McKinnon Miller as Norm Scully; Jamie Denbo as Hillary

Episode chronology
← Previous "Thanksgiving"	Next → "Pontiac Bandit"
- Brooklyn Nine-Nine season 1

"Christmas" is the eleventh episode of the first season of the American television police sitcom series Brooklyn Nine-Nine. The episode was written by series co-creator Dan Goor and directed by Jake Szymanski. It aired on Fox in the United States on December 3, 2013.

In this episode, Holt receives death threats and per protocol, Peralta is assigned as his guardian, much to the latter's joy. However, the situation is worse than he thought. The episode was seen by an estimated 3.66 million household viewers and gained a 1.6/5 ratings share among adults aged 18–49, according to Nielsen Media Research. The episode received mostly positive reviews from critics, who praised Braugher's performance. Braugher was nominated for a Primetime Emmy Award for Outstanding Supporting Actor in a Comedy Series for his performance in the episode.

== Plot ==
In the cold open, Jake and Boyle attempt to break up a fight between two Santas in front of kids.

During Christmas season, Jake Peralta (Andy Samberg) is informed by Deputy Chief Gerber (Mark Berry) that Holt (Andre Braugher) has received death threats. Due to security protocols, Peralta has been chosen to watch Holt, which requires him to control every move he makes, which the former relishes in. Peralta tricks Holt into going to a safe house, handcuffs him to himself, and then throws the key through a vent.

Terry Jeffords (Terry Crews) sees a therapist for a psychiatric evaluation to determine if he can go back into the field. Despite showing no signs of a right analysis, he checks himself out after hearing that Holt is in danger. Charles Boyle (Joe Lo Truglio) visits the safe house after Holt secretly sends him a message to bring him to his old precinct to investigate possible leads. Ultimately, Boyle, Peralta, and Holt end up handcuffed together. After an investigation, Holt discovers that the death threats came from a killer (Kirk Bovill) he arrested years ago who was recently released from prison, and the squad sets out to find him at a train yard. The killer is arrested, but shoots Boyle when he jumps in to save Rosa Diaz (Stephanie Beatriz). The gang is notified that Boyle will recover soon.

== Reception ==
=== Viewers ===
In its original American broadcast, "Christmas" was seen by an estimated 3.66 million household viewers and gained a 1.6/5 ratings share among adults aged 18–49, according to Nielsen Media Research. This was a slight decrease in viewership from the previous episode, which was watched by 3.69 million viewers with a 1.5/4 in the 18-49 demographics. This means that 1.6 percent of all households with televisions watched the episode, while 5 percent of all households watching television at that time watched it. With these ratings, Brooklyn Nine-Nine was the most watched show on FOX for the night, beating Dads and The Mindy Project, third on its timeslot and fifth for the night in the 18-49 demographics, behind a rerun of NCIS, The Biggest Loser, Chicago Fire, and The Voice.

=== Critical reviews ===
"Christmas" received positive reviews from critics. Roth Cornet of IGN gave the episode a "good" 7.9 out of 10 and wrote, "Brooklyn Nine-Nine's 'Christmas' found a clever way to create a Yuletide backdrop without delivering another entirely holiday-themed episode so quickly after Thanksgiving. Holt's history as a hothead adds a nice new element to his relationship with Peralta. Though this was another strong and funny episode, it wasn't quite as hilarious as the previous few installments. Overall, another solid entry, though. Nothing says Christmas cheer like coming together to combat death threats."

Molly Eichel of The A.V. Club gave the episode a "B" grade and wrote, "'Christmas' may not have been my favorite entry so far, but it's a good marker as a midway point. It highlights what's great about the series—a game ensemble who gelled early in the series' life — and what doesn't work so well—a lead who is still not as compelling or as much fun to watch as everyone else around him. But if Holt can change from the Afro'd over -emoter to the stoic center of the Nine-Nine, maybe there's hope for Peralta yet."

Alan Sepinwall of HitFix wrote, "So I spent a lot of the A-story feeling the same way I did with some of those earlier episodes: wishing we would quickly get back to the other supporting characters. And that stuff was fun, whether Terry struggling with his fears in front of the shrink, Santiago scheming to get Diaz to smile or Boyle worrying about his flight, and then getting to play hero in an amazing and yet embarrassing way. Holt pop-and-locking in and of itself made this one a must-see, but I think the episode could have been a lot more." Aaron Channon of Paste gave the episode a 7.3 out of 10 and wrote, "Unfortunately, this accounts for the meat of the episode, and it is largely unentertaining save for a few scattered Sambergisms and Braugherisms. It is true that the uncapitalized-upon potential in this scenario is a minor failure by the writers, but more significantly it shows how much the success of the series thus far has come to rely on the supporting cast. Where 'Thanksgiving' excelled by placing the entire cast together in one room, 'Christmas' fails by separating the detectives of the nine-nine into three separate arcs."
