= Undercover (Brooklyn Nine-Nine) =

First episode of the 2nd season of Brooklyn Nine-Nine

- Brooklyn Nine-Nine episode
- Episode no.: Season 2 Episode 1
- Directed by: Dean Holland
- Written by: Luke Del Tredici
- Cinematography by: Giovani Lampassi
- Editing by: Cortney Carrillo; Sandra Montiel
- Production code: 201
- Original air date: September 28, 2014
- Running time: 22 minutes

Guest appearance
- Jenny Slate as Bianca

Episode chronology
← Previous "Charges and Specs"	Next → "Chocolate Milk"
- Brooklyn Nine-Nine season 2

"Undercover" is the first episode and season premiere of the second season of the American television police sitcom series Brooklyn Nine-Nine. It is the 23rd overall episode of the series and is written by co-executive producer Luke Del Tredici and directed by Dean Holland. It aired on Fox in the United States on September 28, 2014.

The show revolves around the fictitious 99th precinct of the New York Police Department in Brooklyn and the officers and detectives that work there. Jake Peralta (Andy Samberg) is an immature yet very talented detective with an astounding record of crimes solved, putting him in a competition with fellow detective Amy Santiago (Melissa Fumero). The precinct's status changes when the Captain retires and a new commanding officer, Cpt. Raymond Holt (Andre Braugher), is appointed. This creates a conflict between Jake and Holt over their respective methods in the field. In the episode, Jake returns to the precinct after being on undercover missions for six months. However, he soon finds out that a criminal from an organization managed to evade capture. Peralta sets out to find him before he gets away. He also wants to speak with Amy about his feelings for her. Meanwhile, Holt conducts drills for Amy and Rosa without explanation. Additionally, Gina and Boyle face the consequences of sleeping together.

The episode was seen by an estimated 5.46 million household viewers and gained a 2.6/7 ratings share among adults aged 18–49, according to Nielsen Media Research. The episode received positive reviews from critics, who called the episode as a promising start for the season, praising Samberg's performance in the episode.

== Plot ==
Jake organizes a raid that ends with the arrest of the Ianucci crime family. He returns to the precinct after completing his undercover assignment. Jake talks with Amy (Melissa Fumero) and she reveals that she is still dating Teddy. Jake then denies having any feelings for her.

Jake is notified that one member of the organization, Freddy Maliardi, managed to escape capture. Despite his status as a former cop, Jake decides to question old acquaintances who have ties to the mob. He and Boyle (Joe Lo Truglio) choose to go "undercover" and find Freddy. They interrogate his girlfriend and she eventually gives in, revealing that Freddy is planning to flee the country to Barbados. However, they arrive too late and Freddy escapes on a plane. Nevertheless, Jake is comforted in knowing that he caught most members of the crime ring.

Captain Holt forces Amy and Rosa (Stephanie Beatriz) to perform a series of drills that involve Terry (Terry Crews) acting out various scenarios. However, Holt does not explain the purpose of the drills. While the group accepts the drills at first, they soon decide to stop doing them. Holt tells Terry that he held the drills because a new Commissioner will be appointed and wants everyone to be prepared for evaluation. Meanwhile, Gina (Chelsea Peretti) is worried Boyle will tell Jake about their tryst together. Driven by his fear of Gina, Boyle manages to not tell Jake. Despite this, they end up sleeping together again.

== Reception ==
=== Viewers ===
In its original American broadcast, "Undercover" was seen by an estimated 5.46 million household viewers and gained a 2.6/7 ratings share among adults aged 18–49, according to Nielsen Media Research. This was a massive 110% increase in viewership from the previous episode, which was watched by 2.59 million viewers with a 1.3/3 in the 18-49 demographics. This means that 2.6 percent of all households with televisions watched the episode, while 7 percent of all households watching television at that time watched it. With these ratings, Brooklyn Nine-Nine was the third most watched show on FOX for the night, behind The Simpsons and Family Guy, fifth on its timeslot and sixth for the night, behind Once Upon a Time, The Simpsons, Family Guy, NBC Sunday Night Football, and Fox NFL.

=== Critical reviews ===
"Undercover" received positive reviews from critics. Roth Cornet of IGN gave the episode a "great" 8.0 out of 10 and wrote, "Brooklyn Nine-Nine returned with a strong entry that simultaneously reminded us of what we loved about the series in its freshman season, and paved the way for some interesting new directions as it heads into its second."

LaToya Ferguson of The A.V. Club gave the episode a "B−" grade and wrote, "Coming back from summer hiatus, Brooklyn Nine-Nine feels like it's been on for a lot longer than it has. That's meant as a compliment, because the show took little time becoming a fully-formed series. But this premiere specifically feels very comfortable, like an fairly new pair of sneakers you actually love but forgot to wear on a regular basis. This is a good episode, but it's also one that's more like a reminder of what you loved about it and a precursor to greatness to come."

Jackson McHenry of Entertainment Weekly wrote, "Like all of life, 'Undercover' could've used more Stephanie Beatriz, and it's a pity that Amy was mostly defined by her (lack of) relationship to Jake. But Nine-Nine proved, once again, that it has more potential than it can manage to use each week."

Alan Sepinwall of HitFix wrote, "All in all, 'Undercover' wasn't an episode I'd stack up against the funniest episodes of season 1, but premieres like this often have to spend a lot of time on plot and exposition, and it just felt so pleasing to have this show back. Hell, I was just glad to have the opening credits sequence back." Andy Crump of Paste gave the episode an 8.7 and wrote, "So, Brooklyn Nine-Nine's opener sets the stage, as all openers must do. If 'Undercover' is meant to play a specific role and foreshadow events that may occur further down the line, though, it does so handsomely; it's funny, maybe not as funny as it should be, but still chock full of terrific gags and punchlines, most of them property of Lo Truglio and Braugher. (If you thought Holt was dour before, you've apparently seen nothing yet, though good luck spotting the difference between his happy face and his stressed face.) 'I missed us', breathes Peralta in the episode's pre-credits sequence. We missed us, too, Jake. We missed us too." Robin Harry of TV Fanatic gave the episode a 4.5 star rating out of 5 and wrote, "This side-story brought a lot of the familiarity I loved about this episode; Holt's apparent yet invisible sense of humor, Terry's quiet wisdom but loud intimidation, Amy's obsequiousness and subsequent self-loathing, Rosa's rebelliousness. My only complaint - not enough Hitchcock and Scully! This season didn't start off with a bang or bells and whistles, but it started with everything that I know and love about Brooklyn Nine-Nine. That makes it a win for me."
