= Lakshmi Sundaram =

American television writer

Lakshmi Sundaram is an American screenwriter, director, and producer.

Born in Brooklyn, Sundaram studied writing at Columbia University. She also received an MFA in Film from Columbia University's School of the Arts.

Sundaram's first writing credit was for the NBC musical drama television series Smash, co-writing the episode "Tech" with Jason Grote. She would join the writing staff for Brooklyn Nine-Nine, writing for them from 2013 to 2016, and in 2018, as part of the crew for Master of None, she would receive a nomination for the Writers Guild of America Award for Television: Comedy Series. Several of the television shows she has worked on have won Emmy Awards, Golden Globe Awards, Writers Guild of America Awards, and garnered great critical acclaim. Sundaram wrote the episode "Protect Ya Neck" in season 2 of the Hulu series Wu-Tang: An American Saga. The episode received critical and commercial praise, and remains the show's highest rated episode.

Sundaram also appears in acting roles, including as a nurse in the Aziz Ansari film Good Fortune.

Lakshmi Sundaram was named after her great-grandmother Muthulakshmi Reddy, an Indian pioneer of civil rights who was the first woman to sit as Vice President on any legislature in the world, and was a peer of Mahatma Gandhi and Annie Besant. Sundaram's other relatives include the Indian actors Gemini Ganesan and Rekha.

In 2021, Sundaram's accomplishments were profiled by Vogue India, receiving the cover of the magazine's culture section.
