= Dan Goor =

American screenwriter and producer

- Born: Daniel Joshua Goor; April 28, 1975 (age 51); Washington, D.C., U.S.
- Education: Harvard University
- Occupations: Screenwriter; television producer
- Years active: 1993–present
- Spouse: Purvi Harikant Shah (m. 2003)

Daniel Joshua Goor (born April 28, 1975) is an American comedy writer and television producer. He has written for several comedy talk shows including The Daily Show, Last Call with Carson Daly and Late Night with Conan O'Brien. He also worked as a writer, producer, and director for NBC primetime series Parks and Recreation, and was executive-producer and co-creator of the award-winning Fox/NBC series Brooklyn Nine-Nine. He was an executive producer of the NBC series Grand Crew and is the co-creator and co-showrunner of the Peacock series Killing It.

== Personal life ==
Goor is Jewish. He married Purvi Harikant Shah in 2003 in a Jewish-Hindu interfaith ceremony.

== Filmography ==
=== Parks and Recreation ===
- 1.3: "The Reporter"
- 2.10: "Hunting Trip"
- 2.14: "Leslie's House"
- 2.24: "Freddy Spaghetti"
- 3.07: "Harvest Festival"
- 3.16: "Li'l Sebastian"
- 4.01: "I'm Leslie Knope"
- 4.09: "The Trial of Leslie Knope" (with Michael Schur)
- 4:17: "Campaign Shake-Up" (also Directed by)
- 5.03: "How a Bill Becomes a Law"
- 5.09: "Ron and Diane" (Directed by)

=== Brooklyn Nine-Nine ===
- 1.01: "Pilot" (with Michael Schur)
- 1.11: "Christmas"
- 1.15: "Operation: Broken Feather" (with Michael Schur)
- 2.18: "Captain Peralta"
- 3.23: "Greg and Larry" (Directed by)
- 4.01: "Coral Palms: Part 1"
- 4.23: "Crime and Punishment" (Directed by)
- 5.04: "HalloVeen"
- 5.22: "Jake & Amy" (with Luke Del Tredici) (also Directed by)
- 6.18: "Suicide Squad" (with Luke Del Tredici) (also Directed by)
- 7.13: "Lights Out" (with Luke Del Tredici) (also Directed by)
- 8.10: "The Last Day: Part 2"

=== Killing It ===
- 1.01: "Pilot"
