= Craig Zisk =

American director and producer

- Born: United States
- Occupations: Film director, television producer
- Relatives: Randy Zisk (brother)

Craig Zisk is an American director and producer.

== Biography ==
Zisk grew up in Dallas, where he graduated from the St. Mark's School of Texas. His family was Jewish.

After graduating from the University of Southern California, Zisk directed his first television series, Brooklyn Bridge, at the age of 26. His first feature film was The English Teacher, starring Julianne Moore, Greg Kinnear, Nathan Lane, Michael Angarano and Lily Collins.

Zisk has executive-produced several series including Weeds, United States of Tara and The Larry Sanders Show. He has also directed over 50 series, including The Big C, Nurse Jackie, Entourage, The Office, Alias, Smash, Parks and Recreation, Shameless, Nip/Tuck, The Exorcist, New Amsterdam, Brave New World, and Halo.

Zisk has been nominated for several Golden Globe Awards for Weeds. He has also earned multiple Emmy nominations for The Larry Sanders Show and Weeds, including a nomination for Best Director for a Comedy.

His brother Randy Zisk is also a television director.

== See also ==
- Notable alumni of St. Mark's School of Texas
