= Melissa Fumero =

American actress and director (born 1982)

- Fumero at Rose City Comic Con in 2026
- Born: Melissa Gallo; August 19, 1982 (age 44); Lyndhurst, New Jersey, U.S.
- Education: New York University (BFA)
- Occupations: Actress; television director
- Years active: 2004–present
- Spouse: David Fumero (m. 2007)
- Children: 2

Melissa Fumero (née Gallo; born August 19, 1982) is an American actress and television director. She made her professional debut in 2004 in the recurring role of Adriana Cramer in the television soap opera One Life to Live. Following several minor roles, she had her first main role as Amy Santiago in the comedy series Brooklyn Nine-Nine, which she played from 2013 to 2021. Since then, she has starred as Melissa Tarleton in the animated series M.O.D.O.K. (2021), Eliza Walker in the Netflix comedy Blockbuster (2022), and Bella Torres in the animated series Digman! (2023–2025). She is married to actor and former model David Fumero, with whom she has 2 sons.

== Early life ==
Melissa Gallo was born in Lyndhurst, New Jersey, on August 19, 1982. Her Cuban parents immigrated to the United States as teenagers. Her mother was a homemaker and hairdresser, and her father taught mathematics and worked at a jewelry store. She grew up in Guttenberg and moved back to Lyndhurst at age six. She and her family spoke Spanish at home, but her parents stopped requiring her and her brother to do so when he encountered issues at school. She attended Lyndhurst High School.

As a child, Fumero enjoyed creating and performing plays, and began taking dance lessons. She expressed interest in acting after seeing Broadway's The Secret Garden at age ten. Her parents subsequently sent her to acting classes. She has said she enjoyed theater lessons because she and her classmates focused on performing rather than their physical appearances. She remained enrolled in dance and acting classes until her graduation. When she was accepted to New York University (NYU), which she called her "dream school", she thought she would be unable to attend due to the cost. To ensure she could attend, her parents spent much of their savings and took out many loans, and she moved back in with them until she moved to New York City at age 19. In 2003, she graduated with a Bachelor of Fine Arts degree in drama.

== Career ==
=== 2004–2012: One Life to Live and other roles ===
Fumero felt ostracized when she began working in the entertainment business. She was only able to audition for certain roles. Hours after her final exam at NYU, she was offered the role of Adriana Cramer on the soap opera One Life to Live (OLTL), which she described as "the biggest redeeming moment". She joined the series on January 20, 2004, and reprised the role in two 2005 episodes of All My Children. She was set to leave the show shortly after her contract with OLTL expired in January 2008, but stayed until June 11; her final scenes were filmed in May. She returned to One Life to Live on several occasions between September 2008 and January 2011.

In 2008, she starred in Tiny Dancer as Ati, a 17-year-old who is persuaded to dance. For the role, she learned the character's Spanish Harlem accent—a task she found difficult—and extensively trained in stretching and yoga to perform the modern and contemporary dance. After One Life to Live, she expressed interest in performing comedy, and booked a role in Important Things with Demetri Martin for Comedy Central in 2009. The following years, she appeared in Gossip Girl, Royal Pains, The Mentalist, and CSI: NY. (Note: Attributed to multiple references:)

=== 2013–2020: breakthrough with Brooklyn Nine-Nine ===
Fumero's first starring role and breakthrough came in 2013, when she was cast in Fox's untitled comedy pilot as the female lead opposite Andy Samberg. The show's title was announced in April 2013 as Brooklyn Nine-Nine. It follows a group of New York Police Department detectives in Brooklyn's fictional 99th precinct. Fumero portrays the rule-following, competitive character Amy Santiago. To prepare, she and Brooklyn's cast received police and firearm training. Fumero is one of the show's two regular Latina cast members, the other being Stephanie Beatriz, who portrays Rosa Diaz. Fumero described this casting as groundbreaking, though the two feared one of them would be fired. Before the pilot was filmed, they decided to emphasise the differences in their appearances; Fumero straightened her hair while Beatriz made hers wavy. On September 17, 2013, Brooklyn Nine-Nine's pilot aired, garnering over six million viewers and positive reviews. (Note: Attributed to multiple references:) The A.V. Club praised the contrasts between Samberg's and Fumero's acting styles, calling her "a real find". Reviews of the first season were also positive, and it received 5.2 million total viewers.

In May 2014, Fox renewed Brooklyn Nine-Nine for a second season that would air during the 2014–2015 television season. Its premiere, "Undercover", was well received by critics. (Note: Attributed to multiple references:) Reception of Fumero's performance was positive; Collider lauded her comedic timing, drive, and vulnerability, while Entertainment Weekly found her acting convincing in a scene in which Amy tells Jake (Samberg) "[n]othing's going to happen" between them romantically. Journalists lauded the rest of the season and deemed the cast "winning". In 2015, the show's cast were nominated for a Screen Actors Guild Award for Outstanding Performance by an Ensemble in a Comedy Series. Fumero's performance garnered her an Imagen Award nomination for Best Supporting Actress; she later received three more nominations for her work on the same show, including a win in 2022.

Brooklyn Nine-Nine's third season premiered in September 2015. Fumero said she found comic acting much easier, having become more familiar with Amy's character, and added she had "fallen into a real groove and rhythm" with her approach to scenes. Fumero was pregnant during the season's production, which led to a storyline in which Amy goes undercover as a pregnant woman. The directors and camera operators used methods such as positioning her behind objects to hide her pregnancy. Of the experience, she said, "I don't recommend it", citing difficulties memorizing her lines and focusing on scenes. Brooklyn's fourth and fifth seasons aired from September 2016 to May 2018; both seasons were acclaimed by critics, who continued to praise the ensemble.

In May 2018, Fox cancelled Brooklyn after five seasons. The news quickly became the subject of social media campaigns for the show's renewal. A day after the cancellation, NBC accepted an offer to air the show for a sixth season. Fumero described the experience as "the most intense and emotional 36 hours of my life." On January 10, 2019, the season debuted to an audience of 3.6 million, the show's highest ratings in two years. Over its eighteen-episode run, it received 3.1 million viewers. Critics unanimously praised the season. The Hollywood Reporter commented the season premiere was "a quick and easy reminder of how good Fumero and Samberg are together;" the magazine said Samberg's smaller moments gave her the chance to be "wonderfully broad". Fumero's performance in the #MeToo-themed episode "He Said, She Said" garnered particular praise: Den of Geek found her phenomenal; TVLine named her their performer of the week, calling her performance "understated yet effective" and commending her "soft-spoken tone [that] captured the broken spirit of a woman burdened by victimhood, whose self-worth was forever sullied by the actions of a man who had power over her and chose to abuse it."

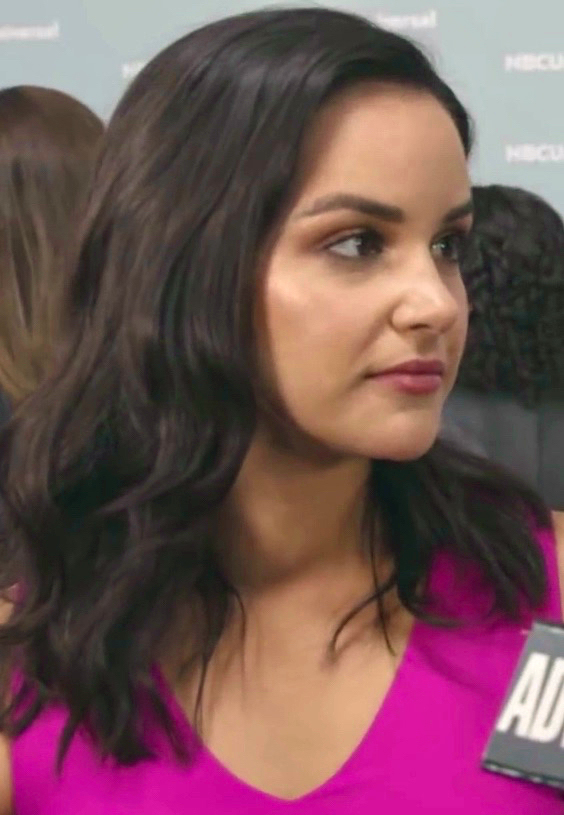
Fumero in 2018

After Fumero complained about a director, her manager asked whether she was considering directing. Fumero dismissed the possibility but her manager had her direct a webisode, which she "ended up really loving". She was hesitant to ask NBC to let her direct an episode of Brooklyn Nine-Nine, although she felt more women of color should be directing: "I didn't ask this season, because it was NBC and ... we're women, and like, I don't wanna ruffle any feathers and it was like, I can't ask a boy to dance, they have to ask me." After the network ordered five additional episodes, and Joe Lo Truglio and Beatriz told her they were applying, Fumero did so as well. She made her directorial debut with the episode "Return of the King" in 2019. It received mixed reviews; The A.V. Club stated: "It's interesting to see Amy essentially direct Rosa to bizarre greatness as Melissa Fumero is actually directing this entire oddity of an episode." Fumero also appeared in Brooklyn's seventh season.

In 2020, her vocal performance in Disney Junior's Elena of Avalor as Antonia—the titular character's seamster and later the first female member of the royal guard—Fumero earned her fourth Imagen Award nomination for Best Supporting Actress. The prior year, she appeared in the reboot of 1975 television series One Day at a Time. Fumero said the latter role was "especially huge" because she worked with Gloria Estefan, whose songs she listened as a child.

=== 2021–present: M.O.D.O.K and Blockbuster ===
In the animated series M.O.D.O.K., Fumero voiced Melissa Tarleton, the titular character's 17-year-old daughter who wants to gain his approval as a supervillain. When she auditioned, Fumero was not given any information about the show; she accepted the role when she learned Patton Oswalt would help develop and write the show, knowing it was "going to be hilarious". Of the show's premise, Fumero said: "I just thought that take was super fun and fresh to do a show from the point of view of a supervillain, to dive into what his family life could potentially be in this world of villains and supervillains." The show was released on May 21, 2021, to critical acclaim and particular praise for its cast. Commenting on Fumero's voice acting, Comic Book Resources said she "[brings Melissa] to life with just the right amount of teenaged moodiness".

Brooklyn Nine-Nine's eighth and final season began its broadcast on August 12, 2021, with the episodes "The Good Ones" and "The Lake House". Both episodes garnered positive reviews, (Note: Attributed to multiple references:) with The A.V. Club praising Fumero as one of the "comedic centerpieces" of the former. Reviews of the season were mostly positive. Fumero compared the experience of leaving Brooklyn to high-school graduation:

[Y]ou're so proud that you did the thing and you reached this moment, but you're also so sad because deep down, you know all your friends are going to different colleges and you're never going to see them again. It's that mix of really proud and grateful.

After finishing Brooklyn Nine-Nine, Fumero was unsure whether she wanted to act in another workplace comedy. However, she was excited when she was given the script for Netflix's comedy Blockbuster, whose writer, Vanessa Ramos, Fumero had met on Brooklyn Nine-Nine and described as "one of the funniest people [she has] ever met". Fumero thought the script was "amazing" and accepted the role, partially because she wanted to work with Ramos and lead actor Randall Park. Fumero "immediately connected" to her character Eliza, a devoted mother who is experiencing difficulties with her marriage to her teenage boyfriend. Eliza, unlike Amy, felt lost. At first, Fumero felt nervous about portraying Eliza, who she wanted to ensure was a distinctive character. Blockbuster premiered on November 3, 2022. IGN described Fumero's performance as "engaging and sometimes passionate"; and Vanity Fair said the show's characters caused the actors to perform at "half speed".

In 2021, Fumero was cast in the comedy film Bar Fight!. It follows former couple Nina (Fumero) and Allen (Luka Jones), who to avoid drama after their breakup divided everything in their lives—except their favorite local bar, an omission that causes a battle between them. The film was released on November 11, 2022, to negative reviews. Elizabeth Weitzman of TheWrap said Fumero and co-star Rachel Bloom "don't have the BFF chemistry both actresses work hard to generate, but that's because the characters are all sketched in two dimensions". That year, Fumero joined the cast of adult animated television series Digman! as Bella Torres, reuniting with Samberg, the voice of the titular character (once again her onscreen husband) and co-creator of the show. Fumero also directed two episodes of the 2023 sitcom Primo, which was created by Shea Serrano and co-executive produced by Brooklyn Nine-Nine's co-creator Michael Schur. In 2024, Fumero began hosting the comedy podcast More Better with Stephanie and Melissa alongside Beatriz.

== Public image ==
Fumero appeared in The Hollywood Reporter's "Young Hispanic Hollywood Class of 2013". In 2016, Variety listed her as one of its "10 Latinos to Watch". Women's Health included her in a list of "50 Latina and Hispanic Actresses Who Are Changing Hollywood for the Better" in 2021.

== Personal life ==
Fumero met actor and former model David Fumero, a fellow Cuban-American, on the set of One Life to Live. They became engaged in late 2006 and married in New Jersey on December 9, 2007. They have two sons, born March 24, 2016 and February 14, 2020.

On July 18, 2021, Fumero made an instagram post using the hashtag #SOSCuba which read "Cuban's [sic] are not protesting because of a lack of vaccines or the embargo as some sources are reporting. They're protesting to obtain freedom from a government that has starved, killed, and censored them for six decades."

== Filmography ==
=== Film ===
Year	Title	Role	Notes
2007	Descent	Dorm girl	Uncredited
2008	Tiny Dancer	Ati	Credited as Melissa Gallo
2009	I Hope They Serve Beer in Hell	Melissa	
2013	The House That Jack Built	Lily	
2017	DriverX	Jessica	
2019	A Stone in the Water	Alex	
2022	Bar Fight!	Nina	

=== Television ===
Year	Title	Role	Notes
2004–2011	One Life to Live	Adriana Cramer	208 episodes
2005	All My Children	Adriana Cramer	2 episodes
2009	Important Things with Demetri Martin	April	Episode: "Coolness"
2010	Gossip Girl	Zoe	5 episodes
2010	The Mentalist	Carmen Reyes	Episode: "Red Letter"
2011	Royal Pains	Brooke	Episode: "Pit Stop"
2012	CSI: NY	Michelle Rhodes	Episode: "The Real McCoy"
2013	Men at Work	April	Episode: "The New Boss"
2013–2021	Brooklyn Nine-Nine	Amy Santiago	Main role; 151 episodes Directed episode: "Return of the King"
2014	Top Chef Duels	Herself	Episode: "Jen Carroll vs. Nyesha Arrington"
2015, 2019	Hollywood Game Night	Herself	2 episodes
2016	Mack & Moxy	The Admirable	Episode: "A Bop-Topus' Garden"
2017	Hell's Kitchen	Herself	Episode: "A Little Slice of Hell"
2018	The $100,000 Pyramid	Herself	Episode: "Bobby Moynihan vs. Melissa Fumero"
2019	America's Got Talent: The Champions	Herself	Episode: "The Champions Results Finale"
2019–2020	One Day at a Time	Estrellita	2 episodes
2019–2020	Elena of Avalor	Antonia (voice)	3 episodes
2020	She-Ra and the Princesses of Power	Starla (voice)	Episode: "Stranded"
2020	Match Game	Herself	Episode: "Shooting Blanks"
2020	Big City Greens	Cantaloupe Sinclair (voice)	Episode: "Dolled Up"
2020	Room 104	Eva	Episode: "Bangs"
2021	M.O.D.O.K.	Melissa Tarleton (voice)	Main role; 8 episodes
2021	Diary of a Future President	Ms. Ortega	2 episodes
2022	Grand Crew	—N/a	Directed episode: "Wine & Hip Hop"
2022	Gordita Chronicles	—N/a	Directed episode: "In America You Get What You Pay For"
2022	Blockbuster	Eliza Walker	Main role; 10 episodes
2023	Animaniacs	Luisa / Maria (voice)	Episode: "WARnerGAMES/Starbox & Cindy: Bedtime/WARnerGAMES 2/Crumbly's Moment"
2023	Lopez vs Lopez	Natalia	Episode: "Lopez vs. Bucket Crabs"
2023	Primo	—N/a	Directed 2 episodes: "The Game Champ" and "The Candy Bar"
2023	Celebrity Jeopardy!	Herself	Contestant
2023–2024	Velma	Sophie (voice)	18 episodes
2023–2026	Digman!	Bella Torres (voice)	Main role
2024	Night Court	Jasmine Jennings	Episode: "Chips Ahoy"
2024	Based on a True Story	Drew Stephens/Olivia Carter	6 episodes
2025	Grosse Pointe Garden Society	Birdie	Lead role
2025	Haunted Hotel	Additional voice (voice)	Episode: "Ghost Hunters!"
2026	Family Guy	Carmen Perez (voice)	Episode: "Phony Montana"
2027	Einstein	Teresa "Teri" London	Lead role

=== Web ===
Year	Title	Role	Notes
2009	Haute & Bothered	Jo	11 episodes
2011	Half Empty	Jill	Short film
2017	Mourners, Inc.	Monica Herrera	Episode: "Pilot"
2018	Stolen Hearts	Erica	Short film

=== Podcasts ===
Year	Title	Notes
2024	More Better with Stephanie and Melissa	Host

== Audiobooks ==
Year	Title	Role
2018	The Land I Lost (Ghosts of the Shadow Market 7)	Narrator
2023	PREVIA: A Tech Heist	Claudia

== Awards and nominations ==
Year (Note: Refers to the year in which the award was given)	Association	Category	Work	Result	Ref.
2015	Screen Actors Guild Awards	Outstanding Performance by an Ensemble in a Comedy Series (Note: Shared with the cast of Brooklyn Nine-Nine)	Brooklyn Nine-Nine	Nominated	
2015	Imagen Awards	Best Supporting Actress – Television	Brooklyn Nine-Nine	Nominated	
2016	Imagen Awards	Best Supporting Actress – Television	Brooklyn Nine-Nine	Nominated	
2019	Imagen Awards	Best Supporting Actress – Television	Brooklyn Nine-Nine	Nominated	
2020	Imagen Awards	Best Supporting Actress – Television	Elena of Avalor	Nominated	
2022	Imagen Awards	Best Supporting Actress – Comedy (Television)	Brooklyn Nine-Nine	Won	
