= Amy Santiago =

Brooklyn Nine-Nine character

- Brooklyn Nine-Nine character
- Melissa Fumero as Amy
- First appearance: "Pilot"; Brooklyn Nine-Nine; September 17, 2013
- Last appearance: "The Last Day Pt.2 "; Brooklyn Nine-Nine; September 16, 2021
- Created by: Dan Goor; Michael Schur
- Portrayed by: Melissa Fumero

In-universe information
- Occupation: NYPD Police Detective (Season 1–5); NYPD Police Sergeant (Season 5–8); NYPD Chief of Police Reform (Season 8)
- Family: Victor Santiago (father); Camila Santiago (mother); David Santiago (brother)
- Spouses: Jake Peralta (m. 2018)
- Significant others: Teddy Wells (season 1-2)
- Children: McClane "Mac" Santiago-Peralta (son)
- Relatives: Roger Peralta (father-in-law); Karen Peralta (mother-in-law)

Amy Santiago is a fictional character who appears in police procedural comedy television series Brooklyn Nine-Nine (2013–2021). Portrayed by Melissa Fumero, she works as a detective at the New York Police Department in Brooklyn's fictional 99th precinct from the beginning of the show until its fifth season, when she is promoted to sergeant. In the series finale, she becomes the chief of the police reform program.

== Character role ==
Amy Santiago is established as a knowledgeable, competitive and goal-oriented character at the start of Brooklyn Nine-Nine; according to Nylon, she initially fit the trope of the overachieving goody two shoes. She is shown to be a controlling and over-achieving perfectionist with a Type A personality. Amy credits her competitiveness to growing up with seven brothers. Other characters consider her somewhat overbearing and often joke about her; Amy is teased for her nerdy aspects but not mocked or condemned. The Atlantic states that the show highlights how Amy's intelligence is not equivalent to her being an unappealing, solitary genius. She is defined by traits that are not frequently combined in female characters—for example, she seeks perfection but cannot stop smoking; she loves rules but is not afraid to disobey them when they are unfair; and she has a crossword puzzle obsession despite working in a risky, physically demanding job. Like her workplace colleague Rosa Diaz, Santiago is a female Latina officer. However, unlike the more tough and abrasive Diaz, Santiago tends to be more good-natured, even going as far as to try to prepare a Thanksgiving meal for her workplace colleagues and push for Christmas photos of them smiling.

Amy initially works as a detective at the New York Police Department (NYPD) in Brooklyn's fictional 99th precinct. It is said that her dream is to be the NYPD's youngest captain. She becomes a sergeant in the fifth season, and is promoted to chief of the police reform program after her captain, Raymond Holt, becomes deputy commissioner of the program.

Amy is competitive with fellow detective Jake Peralta, which brings the two closer together. The relationship between Jake and Amy begins as a friendly rivalry and later develops into one that is based on respect for one another. They begin dating in the third season. As a result of their relationship, Amy's personality leavens, though her intensity is unaffected. According to The Atlantic, their bond enables the show to highlight Jake's supportiveness and Amy's vulnerability. The two are fond of each other's flaws, such as his crude "frat boy" humor and her obsessive need for order and discipline. In the fifth season, they become engaged and marry. They have their first child, McClane "Mac" Santiago-Peralta, in the seventh season.

== Development ==
=== Creation ===
Writers and producers Michael Schur and Dan Goor, who had known each other since they were students at Harvard University and collaborated on the sitcom Parks and Recreation (2009–2015), conceived the idea to set a comedy in a police station; they felt that setting had been insufficiently used in television comedies since Barney Miller (1975–1982).

=== Casting ===
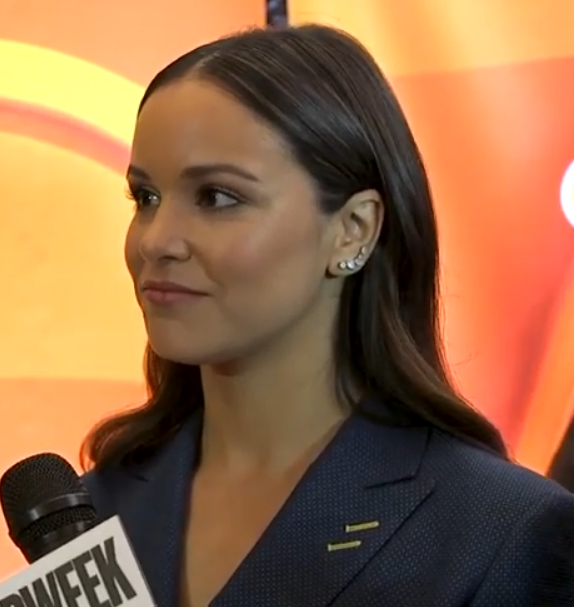
Melissa Fumero portrays Amy in every episode of Brooklyn Nine-Nine

Although she was a long-time fan of comedy, Melissa Fumero's first role was in the soap opera One Life To Live. Once she left the show, she wanted to act in more comedic productions, recalling: "I said to my manager 'I've cried for four years. I want to be silly and have fun.' I kept getting really close to a lot of comedy jobs, but never booking them." During her screen test for Brooklyn Nine-Nine, Fumero did not expect to book the role but "kept it fun"; the chemistry between Fumero and Andy Samberg (who would portray Jake) was immediately apparent, and they had a significant amount of back and forth energy. To prepare, she and Brooklyn's cast received police and firearm training. Fumero is one of the two Latina regular cast members, the other being Stephanie Beatriz (who portrays Rosa Diaz). This casting was described as groundbreaking by Fumero, though the two feared one of them would get fired. As a result, they tried to make their appearances as distinct from one another as possible; for example, Fumero's character has straight hair, while Beatriz's has wavy hair. Due to her lack of experience with comedy, Fumero usually was nervous—a trait the writers incorporated into Amy's personality.

By the show's third season, Fumero said she found comic acting much easier, having become more familiar with Amy's character; she added that she had "fallen into a real groove and rhythm" with the manner she approached scenes. During the season's production, Fumero was pregnant, which led to a storyline in which Amy goes undercover as a pregnant lady. The directors and camera operators also used other methods to hide Fumero's pregnancy, such as having her stand behind things. Of the experience, she said, "I don't recommend it", citing difficulties in memorizing her lines and focusing on a scene.

== Reception ==
Amy has been praised as a positive representation of overachieving, nerdy women.
