= Joel McKinnon Miller =

American actor

- Born: February 21, 1960 (age 66); Rockford, Minnesota, U.S.
- Occupation: Actor
- Years active: 1991–present
- Spouse: Tammy McKinnon (m. 1984)
- Children: 2

Joel McKinnon Miller (born February 21, 1960) is an American actor. He played Don Embry on Big Love (2006–2011) and Detective Norm Scully on Brooklyn Nine-Nine (2013–2021).

== Early life ==
Joel McKinnon Miller took opera singing lessons as a child, and later attended the University of Minnesota Duluth, where he studied theatre and opera. He dropped out in 1983 to attend The Acting Company but returned to his alma mater to finish his degree in theatre with an acting emphasis in 2007.

== Career ==
Prior to Big Love, McKinnon Miller's main television role was that of Lyle Nubbin in three episodes of Las Vegas. He has appeared as a guest star on single episodes of several American television series, including Cold Case, Murphy Brown, The Commish, Curb Your Enthusiasm, Pacific Blue, Dharma & Greg, The X Files, ER, Malcolm in the Middle, Roswell, CSI: Crime Scene Investigation, Deadwood, Six Feet Under, Desperate Housewives, Boston Legal, Nip/Tuck, American Horror Story, The Closer, and Everybody Loves Raymond. He was a main cast member throughout the TV series Brooklyn Nine-Nine as Detective Norm Scully which he played for all seasons. However, he revealed in a podcast chat that he and Dirk Blocker, who played Hitchcock, were only signed on for 4 episodes at the start.

On film, he has played supporting characters in The Truman Show, Galaxy Quest, Rush Hour 2 and Men in Black II, and supplied the voice of Bromley in the animated feature The Swan Princess.

On December 30, 2018, McKinnon Miller sang the national anthem before a Minnesota Vikings at the U.S. Bank Stadium. He identifies himself as a lifelong Vikings fan.

== Personal life ==
He married Tammy McKinnon in 1984 and has lived in Los Angeles since 1991. He and his wife have two children, Owen and Caitlyn.

McKinnon Miller is a Lutheran and is affiliated with the Evangelical Lutheran Church in America (ELCA).

== Filmography ==
=== Film ===
Year	Title	Role	Notes
1992	Forever Young	Man at Picnic	
1993	Dream Lover	Minister	
1994	Wagons East	Zack Ferguson	
1994	The Swan Princess	Bromley	Voice role
1997	Dead Men Can't Dance	Bearclaw	
1997	The Maker	Customs Officer	
1998	The Truman Show	Garage Attendant	
1999	Galaxy Quest	Warrior Alien	
2000	The Family Man	Tommy	
2001	Rush Hour 2	Tex	
2002	Men in Black II	MIB Agent	
2002	Unconditional Love	Barman	
2002	Friday After Next	Officer Hole	
2004	After the Sunset	Wendell	
2005	Guess Who	Security Guard	
2005	Just like Heaven	Lead Ghostbuster	
2006	Love Comes to the Executioner	Ben Blesic	
2007	Delta Farce	Air Force Transport Pilot	
2007	The Blue Hour	Jimmy	
2010	Radio Free Albemuth	Berkeley Detective	
2011	Little Birds	Michael White	
2011	Atlas Shrugged: Part I	Herbert Mowen	
2011	Super 8	Sal Kaznyk	
2013	Shotgun Wedding	Hank Fletcher	
2013	Rushlights	Sal Marinaro	
2016	Soy Nero	Sergeant Frank White	

=== Television ===
Year	Title	Role	Notes
1991	Murphy Brown	Joe Smith	Episode: "The Smiths Go to Washington"
1992	The Powers That Be	Telephone Repair Guy	Episode: "Bill's Dead... Not"
1993	Mother of the Bride	Photographer	TV movie
1993	Dream On	Dick Hermann	Episode: "Depth Be Not Proud"
1994	Hardball	Fan #1	Episode: "Pilot"
1994	Love & War	Burt	Episode: "The Great Escape"
1995	The Rockford Files: A Blessing in Disguise	Mackie	TV movie
1995	The Commish	Michael Muldoon	2 episodes
1995	Picket Fences	Painter	Episode: "A Change of Season"
1995	Courthouse	Officer Lucas	Episode: "Conflict of Interest"
1995	The Crew	Beer	Episode: "Bar Mitzvah Boy"
1996	The Home Court	Cousin Roy	Episode: "The Importance of Being Ernie"
1996	Sister, Sister	Bert Walker	Episode: "Reality Really Bites"
1996	Pacific Blue	Rat Man	Episode: "The Phoenix"
1996	Boston Common	Manager	Episode: "Everybody's Stalking"
1997	Prison of Secrets	Dennis	TV movie
1997	Crisis Center	Bob	Episode: "Someone to Watch Over Me"
1997	Dharma & Greg	Hooper	Episode: "He Ain't Heavy, He's My Father"
1998	Blackout Effect	Brian Mack	TV movie
1998	The Rat Pack	G-Man #1	TV movie
1998	Maggie	Mr. Dawson	Episode: "Ka-Boom"
1998	Rugrats	Dummi Bear	Voice role; Episode: "Raising Dil/No Naps"
1999	The X-Files	Deputy Greer	Episode: "Agua Mala"
1999	The Thirteenth Year	Hal	TV movie
1999	JAG	Gary Sharps	Episode: "Front and Center"
2000	Malcolm in the Middle	Officer Karl	Episode: "Stock Car Races"
2000	ER	Mr. Emerson	Episode: "Match Made in Heaven"
2000	Miracle in Lane 2	Bill	TV movie
2000	Spin City	George	Episode: "The Spanish Prisoner"
2001	Nikki	Mr. Higgins	Episode: "Fallback"
2001	The Jennie Project	Frank	TV movie
2001	Any Day Now	Bartender	Episode: "Peace of Mind"
2001	Curb Your Enthusiasm	Dr. Wiggins	Episode: "Shaq"
2002	Undeclared	Mr. Nesbitt	Episode: "Parents' Weekend"
2002	Roswell	Toby	Episode: "Graduation"
2002	Push, Nevada	Air Charter Company Manager	Episode: "The Letter of the Law"
2002	Still Standing	Frank	Episode: "Still Cheering"
2003	CSI: Crime Scene Investigation	Bird Watcher	Episode: "Got Murder?"
2003	Tremors	Red Landers	Episode: "A Little Paranoia Among Friends"
2003	Joan of Arcadia	Don 'Wood Man' Bicke	Episode: "The Boat"
2003	Secret Santa	Harley	TV movie
2004	Oliver Beene	Cop	Episode: "Dibs"
2004	Deadwood	Nathan Gordon	Episode: "Reconnoitering the Rim"
2004	Six Feet Under	Tuttle Friend With Flattop	Episode: "Grinding the Corn"
2004	Jack & Bobby	Officer Marty Shallock	Episode: "The First Lady"
2004	Cold Case	Brad Atwater	Episode: "Who's Your Daddy"
2005	George Lopez	Dan Driscoll	Episode: "George Negoti-ate It"
2005	Everybody Loves Raymond	George	Episode: "The Faux Pas"
2005	Boston Legal	Robert Berrin/Zozo the Clown	Episode: "Truly, Madly, Deeply"
2005	Desperate Housewives	The Counselor	Episode: "Children Will Listen"
2005	Gone But Not Forgotten	Frank Grimsbo	TV movie
2005–2006	Las Vegas	Lyle Nubbin	3 episodes
2006	In Justice	Detective Lawson	Episode: "Confessions"
2006	The Jake Effect	Cop	Episode: "Don't Mess with Sloppy"
2006	The Closer	Hoss - Bailiff	Episode: "Mom Duty"
2006–2011	Big Love	Don Embry	Main cast (seasons 1–3), recurring role (seasons 4–5)
2007	Nip/Tuck	Duke Collins	Episode: "Duke Collins"
2009	The Cleaner	Officer Larkin	Episode: "The Turtle & The Butterfly"
2010	The New Adventures of Old Christine	Officer Dutton	Episode: "Revenge Makeover"
2011	Bones	U.S. Border Agent	Episode: "The Feet on the Beach"
2011	Community	Store announcer	Voice only cameo; episode: "Celebrity Pharmacology"
2011	Workaholics	Head Cop	Episode: "6 Hours Till Hedonism II"
2012	Melissa & Joey	Leo Larbeck	2 episodes
2012	Glee	Richard Lavender	Episode: "Dance with Somebody"
2012–2013	American Horror Story: Asylum	Det. Connors	3 episodes
2012–2013	Blue	Mr. Weston	2 episodes
2013	Good Luck Charlie	Kevin	Episode: "Duncan Dream House"
2013	Mob City	Sergeant	Episode: "Reason to Kill a Man"
2013–2021	Brooklyn Nine-Nine	Norm Scully, Earl Scully	Main cast
2017	Longmire	Ed Nardo	Episode: "The Eagle and the Osprey"
2022	The Staircase	Larry Pollard	Miniseries, recurring role
2023	Station 19	Reggie	2 episodes: "Never Gonna Give You Up" and "All These Things That I've Done"

=== Video game ===
Year	Title	Role
1996	Star Trek: Klingon	Pakled Trader
