= The Venue (Brooklyn Nine-Nine) =

- Brooklyn Nine-Nine episode
- Episode no.: Season 5 Episode 6
- Directed by: Cortney Carrillo
- Written by: Matt Lawton
- Cinematography by: Giovani Lampassi
- Editing by: Jeremy Reuben
- Production code: 506
- Original air date: November 14, 2017
- Running time: 21 minutes

Guest appearances
- Maria Thayer as Jean Munhroe; Ellen D. Williams as Helgata; Dean Winters as Keith "The Vulture" Pembroke

Episode chronology
← Previous "Bad Beat"	Next → "Two Turkeys"
- Brooklyn Nine-Nine season 5

"The Venue" is the 6th episode of the fifth season of the American television police sitcom series Brooklyn Nine-Nine, and the 96th overall episode of the series. The episode was written by Matt Lawton and directed by Cortney Carrillo. It aired on Fox in the United States on November 14, 2017.

The show revolves around the fictitious 99th precinct of the New York Police Department in Brooklyn and the officers and detectives that work in the precinct. In the episode, Jake and Amy compete to get a venue to hold the wedding but find that The Vulture already reserved it for his wedding and they orchestrate to disrupt his possibilities. Meanwhile, Boyle and Rosa investigate the disappearance of Sergeant Peanut Butter while Terry prepares a party for someone he accidentally offended.

According to Nielsen Media Research, the episode was seen by an estimated 1.65 million household viewers and gained a 0.6/2 ratings share among adults aged 18–49. The episode received positive reviews from critics, who praised the cast's performances although some storylines received more criticism.

== Plot ==
In the cold open, Rosa shows off various ways to throw doughnut holes into Jake's mouth. Jake misses the last one she tosses, but it ends up getting thrown out the window and caught by Scully on the street.

Jake (Andy Samberg) and Amy (Melissa Fumero) announce that they have set a date for the wedding: May 2018 and work on getting a specific venue. However, they're notified that their venue has been taken by The Vulture (Dean Winters), who is marrying a woman named Jean Munhroe (Maria Thayer) on that date.

Jake and Amy find that Jean is a kind charity worker who is inheriting a large sum of money and decide to catch The Vulture cheating on her. They pretend to be a woman on a dating app, to whom The Vulture sends pictures of his penis. They confront him about it, to which he insists he regrets, claiming that he has changed and is deeply in love with her. He promises to give them the venue if they remain quiet. Despite this, after learning how much he's lied to her about his character, they tell the truth to Jean, who dumps The Vulture. Jake and Amy decide to hold an after-party at the venue after The Vulture uses it for a wrestling match.

Meanwhile, Boyle (Joe Lo Truglio) and Rosa (Stephanie Beatriz) investigate the disappearance of Sergeant Peanut Butter, the horse that overshadowed Boyle's Medal of Valor presentation. They find him in a warehouse by a man who flees by setting it on fire. Boyle manages to get the horse out in time but the media falsely gives credit to Peanut Butter, much to his dismay. Rosa eventually decides to leak video evidence online so Boyle could be properly credited. Also, Holt (Andre Braugher) tries to convince Terry (Terry Crews) to be less image-conscious after Terry begins to prepare a party for a cop he accidentally offended. After making the preparations, Terry takes Holt's advice and decides to throw the party for Boyle to celebrate him rescuing Sergeant Peanut Butter instead.

== Reception ==
=== Viewers ===
In its original American broadcast, "The Venue" was seen by an estimated 1.65 million household viewers and gained a 0.6/2 ratings share among adults aged 18–49, according to Nielsen Media Research. This was 10% increase in viewership from the previous episode, which was watched by 1.50 million viewers with a 0.6/2 in the 18-49 demographics. This means that 0.6 percent of all households with televisions watched the episode, while 2 percent of all households watching television at that time watched it. With these ratings, Brooklyn Nine-Nine was the third highest rated show on FOX for the night, behind The Mick and Lethal Weapon, sixth on its timeslot and fifteenth for the night, behind The Mick, The Mayor, Kevin (Probably) Saves the World, Law & Order True Crime, The Flash, Lethal Weapon, Black-ish, Fresh Off the Boat, NCIS: New Orleans, Bull, The Middle, NCIS, The Voice, and This Is Us.

=== Critical reviews ===
"The Venue" received positive reviews from critics. Genevieve Valentine of The A.V. Club gave the episode a "B−" grade and wrote, "When Brooklyn Nine-Nine is on its game, it's one of television's warmest half-hours. (See the donut-hole cold open that gets an offhand callback halfway through the episode just because.) But after sticking a toe into more serious waters early in the season, 'The Venue' seems like a deliberate attempt to bring some lighter screwball energy back into the season. Unfortunately, there's also a sense that the show panicked a little somehow about why everyone likes it, and tried too hard in places it didn't need to try rather than letting the episode rest on its strengths."

Alan Sepinwall of Uproxx wrote, "I've said it before and I'll say it again: one of the reasons Jake and Amy have been such an entertaining couple is that the show only occasionally tells stories about their couplehood, and can often go whole episodes without acknowledging that they're dating/engaged. So when we get a full-on Peralta/Santiago tale like in 'The Venue,' you know it's because someone in the writers room had a fun idea for the two of them, rather than because they felt they had to service the show's primary romance."
