= HalloVeen =

- Brooklyn Nine-Nine episode
- Episode no.: Season 5 Episode 4
- Directed by: Jamie Babbit
- Written by: Dan Goor
- Cinematography by: Giovani Lampassi
- Editing by: Jeremy Reuben
- Production code: 504
- Original air date: October 17, 2017
- Running time: 22 minutes

Guest appearance
- Winston Story as Bill

Episode chronology
← Previous "Kicks"	Next → "Bad Beat"
- Brooklyn Nine-Nine season 5

"HalloVeen" is the 4th episode of the fifth season of the American television police sitcom series Brooklyn Nine-Nine, and the 94th overall episode of the series. The episode was written by series co-creator Dan Goor and directed by Jamie Babbit. It aired on Fox in the United States on October 17, 2017.

The show revolves around the fictitious 99th precinct of the New York Police Department in Brooklyn and the officers and detectives that work in the precinct. In the episode, it's the fifth annual Halloween heist in the 99th precinct and everyone is competing in order to get the "Amazing Human/Genius" title in a belt.

According to Nielsen Media Research, the episode was seen by an estimated 1.69 million household viewers and gained a 0.6/2 ratings share among teenagers and adults aged 18–49. The episode received critical acclaim from critics, who praised the storylines, performances and writing, with some deeming it the best Halloween episode and one of the best in the series.

== Plot ==
On the fifth annual Halloween heist, Jake (Andy Samberg), Holt (Andre Braugher) and Amy (Melissa Fumero) compete for a champion cummerbund, shortened to "belt" for "amazing human/genius". However, Terry (Terry Crews), Rosa (Stephanie Beatriz) and Boyle (Joe Lo Truglio) also compete for the belt.

Someone steals the belt and threatens the precinct by posing as Gina. However, this is part of Jake's and Boyle's plan as "Gina" is actually Bill (Winston Story), from last year. However, Boyle handcuffs Jake, having teamed up with Rosa and Terry to get the belt and also has Bill watch over him as he invested in pyramid scheme NutriBoom. Jake manages to get free by doubling Boyle's offer, investing in NutriBoom. Meanwhile, Holt uses Cheddar to retrieve the belt but finds that neither the belt nor the dog is authentic.

Amy retrieves the belt and locks it in her vault. Jake then uses extras to distract everyone and hide the belt. When Jake and Amy are in the evidence locker, Amy finds it but discovers that Jake changed the title to "Amy Santiago, will you marry me?" and Jake proposes to her. She happily accepts. Boyle then barges into the evidence room and he sees Jake and Amy and Boyle faints due to happiness as Jake and Amy are now engaged. And the precinct goes to a bar to celebrate. While everyone makes a toast for them, Holt is slightly upset as no one won the belt because Jake changed the inscription.

== Reception ==
=== Viewers ===
In its original American broadcast, "HalloVeen" was seen by an estimated 1.69 million household viewers and gained a 0.6/2 ratings share among adults aged 18–49, according to Nielsen Media Research. This was slight increase in viewership from the previous episode, which was watched by 1.68 million viewers with a 0.7/3 in the 18-49 demographics. This means that 0.6 percent of all households with televisions watched the episode, while 2 percent of all households watching television at that time watched it. With these ratings, Brooklyn Nine-Nine was the third highest rated show on FOX for the night, behind The Mick and Lethal Weapon, sixth on its timeslot and fifteenth for the night, behind The Mick, The Mayor, Kevin (Probably) Saves the World, The Flash, Lethal Weapon, Law & Order True Crime, Fresh Off the Boat, Black-ish, NCIS: New Orleans, Bull, The Middle, NCIS, The Voice, and This Is Us.

=== Critical reviews ===
"HalloVeen" received critical acclaim. LaToya Ferguson of The A.V. Club gave the episode an "A" grade and wrote, "The entire Halloween heist hinges on those involved outsmarting each other, and as part of that fun, it cheapens it if any of the characters are dumbed down to create that type of outsmarting. The past couple of Halloween episodes have remembered that, and 'HalloVeen' improves upon that recognition by making sure everyone available is able to do that. Seriously, even Scully and Hitchcock get to show off some brains here (and they do so toward Captain Holt of all people). Their brains are all related to their own perverted weirdo nature, but that's what they're good at, after all." Liz Shannon Miller of IndieWire wrote, "If you were looking for further proof that 'Brooklyn Nine-Nine' is one of the best comedies on television, 'HalloVeen' was it. From the cold open of the episode, the show crackled with energy, letting the lighthearted heist competition that's become a yearly tradition drive the pitch-perfect interactions of the ensemble."

Alan Sepinwall of Uproxx wrote, "Recency bias is always a dangerous thing, and it's been a while since I watched the first few heist episodes, but if 'HalloVeen' isn't my favorite of the tradition, it's vastly better than it has any business being five seasons in." Caroline Framke of Vox wrote, "The Fox sitcom is reliably silly, warmhearted, and very funny, but it wasn't a stretch to assume that its October 17 episode would be particularly good. See, 'HalloVeen' is the fifth of Brooklyn Nine-Nine's annual Halloween episodes, which have centered on the detectives pulling off increasingly ridiculous heists to prove they can outsmart each other. Every single Halloween episode has been a season highlight, but 'HalloVeen' still managed to outdo all the rest thanks to some canny callbacks, a clever twist, and a very good dog."
