= Kicks (Brooklyn Nine-Nine) =

- Brooklyn Nine-Nine episode
- Episode no.: Season 5 Episode 3
- Directed by: Eric Appel
- Written by: Andrew Guest
- Cinematography by: Giovani Lampassi
- Editing by: Jason Gill
- Production code: 503
- Original air date: October 10, 2017
- Running time: 22 minutes

Guest appearances
- Jason Mantzoukas as Adrian Pimento; Vladimir Caamaño as Phil; Amy Okuda as Chiaki

Episode chronology
← Previous "The Big House"	Next → "HalloVeen"
- Brooklyn Nine-Nine season 5

"Kicks" is the 3rd episode of the fifth season of the American television police sitcom series Brooklyn Nine-Nine, and the 93rd overall episode of the series. The episode was written by Andrew Guest and directed by Eric Appel. It aired on Fox in the United States on October 10, 2017.

The show revolves around the fictitious 99th precinct of the New York Police Department in Brooklyn and the officers and detectives that work in the precinct. In the episode, Jake has to pass an evaluation in order to go back to the field with Holt carrying the evaluation. Meanwhile, Rosa begins suspecting Adrian may be cheating on her while she was in prison.

According to Nielsen Media Research, the episode was seen by an estimated 1.68 million household viewers and gained a 0.7/3 ratings share among adults aged 18–49. The episode received positive reviews from critics, who praised Samberg's performance and Jake's character development.

== Plot ==
In the cold open Jake hosts a "Freedom Feast" for the squad consisting of a lot of junk food he's missed having during his time in prison.

Jake (Andy Samberg) is back at the precinct and is excited to go back to working in the field. However, Holt (Andre Braugher) informs him that he has been relegated to desk duty, as his previous prison time prevents him from going into the field.

In order to return to the field, Jake must pass an evaluation test that Holt has to oversee. He and Boyle (Joe Lo Truglio) work on the case of a burglar and find evidence that a certain man is responsible and arrest him. However, Jake begins feeling the man may be innocent and talks with Boyle. The two get a lead on a possible suspect and confront him, who reveals their man is the right one. However, Jake already released the suspect, angering Holt. Jake explains that he wondered about his innocence because he fears people go to prison like him and will have to endure the hardship in prison which Jake experienced. Using new evidence to track the suspect, Holt decides to give back his position to Jake, citing that Jake's prison time has matured him into a better detective but Jake declines, opting for desk duty to readjust.

Meanwhile, Rosa (Stephanie Beatriz) returns with Adrian (Jason Mantzoukas) after a long time in jail. However, feeling Adrian has been distant recently, she uses multiple objects to spy on him. Finding him meeting with a woman, she angrily affirms he's cheating on her and confronts him, breaking up with him. However, Adrian explains that the woman was a Spanish teacher whom he was learning from so he could impress Rosa's parents. Despite him being proven innocent, Rosa decides to break up with him after realizing that she would've felt relieved had he been caught.

== Reception ==
=== Viewers ===
In its original American broadcast, "Kicks" was seen by an estimated 1.68 million household viewers and gained a 0.7/3 ratings share among adults aged 18–49, according to Nielsen Media Research. This was slight decrease in viewership from the previous episode, which was watched by 1.74 million viewers with a 0.6/2 in the 18-49 demographics. This means that 0.7 percent of all households with televisions watched the episode, while 3 percent of all households watching television at that time watched it. With these ratings, Brooklyn Nine-Nine was the third highest rated show on FOX for the night, behind The Mick and Lethal Weapon, sixth on its timeslot and fifteenth for the night, behind The Mick, Kevin (Probably) Saves the World, The Mayor, Lethal Weapon, NCIS: New Orleans, The Flash, Fresh Off the Boat, Law & Order True Crime, Bull, Black-ish, The Middle, NCIS, The Voice, and This Is Us.

=== Critical reviews ===
"Kicks" received positive reviews from critics. LaToya Ferguson of The A.V. Club gave the episode a "B+" grade and wrote, "Brooklyn Nine-Nine could arguably still be funny without any true obstacles, but it would probably get stagnant pretty soon — but those obstacles don't tend to define the series or the characters as a whole. The return to the precinct in 'Kicks' presents an episode of the version of the show that has been missing and missed in these past few episodes, the version of the show that the audience needed to be reminded still exists. Especially given how long the series has been going, since it’s about to hit the coveted 100th (and the reportedly special 99th) episode."

Alan Sepinwall of Uproxx wrote, "I'm ready for the show to get more back to normal, but sending two innocent characters to prison is a big enough deal that it seems fair, and even necessary, to spend some time on that even after they're free. Nobody needs this show to turn into Rectify: The Sitcom, but there are ideas to explore, and evaluation pants to be worn."
