= Bad Beat (Brooklyn Nine-Nine) =

- Brooklyn Nine-Nine episode
- Episode no.: Season 5 Episode 5
- Directed by: Kat Coiro
- Written by: Carol Kolb
- Cinematography by: Giovani Lampassi
- Editing by: Jason Gill
- Production code: 505
- Original air date: November 7, 2017
- Running time: 21 minutes

Guest appearance
- David Figlioni as Daniel Valdano

Episode chronology
← Previous "HalloVeen"	Next → "The Venue"
- Brooklyn Nine-Nine season 5

"Bad Beat" is the 5th episode of the fifth season of the American television police sitcom series Brooklyn Nine-Nine, and the 95th overall episode of the series. The episode was written by Carol Kolb and directed by Kat Coiro. It aired on Fox in the United States on November 7, 2017.

The show revolves around the fictitious 99th precinct of the New York Police Department in Brooklyn and the officers and detectives that work in the precinct. In the episode, Jake, Terry, and Holt prepare to work on an operation to catch a criminal but the process conflicts with Holt's old gambling addiction. Meanwhile, Boyle convinces Amy to invest in a business with him while Rosa sits all day after being challenged by Hitchcock and Scully.

According to Nielsen Media Research, the episode was seen by an estimated 1.50 million household viewers and gained a 0.6/2 ratings share among adults aged 18–49. The episode received positive reviews from critics, who praised Braugher's performance and the character development.

== Plot ==
After making Boyle (Joe Lo Truglio) his best man, Jake (Andy Samberg) meets with Terry (Terry Crews) and Holt (Andre Braugher) to discuss a criminal and going undercover on an underground gambling ring. As Holt wants to stay far from gambling due to a previous addiction, he helps them on the operation.

Jake wears a bug so that Holt can help him win some games to find the criminal in a club. He succeeds and proceeds to meet the criminal later. However, due to this, Holt has relapsed into his gambling addiction, much to Jake's and Terry's dismay. While Jake meets with the criminal, Holt accidentally blows his cover in a bathroom and is held at gunpoint by the criminal and taken to a limo. Jake and Terry manage to track his phone and stop the criminal from killing Holt. Holt eventually decides to enter into Gamblers Anonymous.

Boyle is preparing a meatball sub food truck business with Amy (Melissa Fumero) as one of his primary investors. He finds a truck involved in a crime scene that he thinks would be the perfect fit, but Amy is disgusted with what happened with the truck previously and starts to reconsider her investment. Eventually, Amy finds him another truck so they can start the business properly.

Meanwhile, Rosa (Stephanie Beatriz) is ordered to help Hitchcock (Dirk Blocker) and Scully (Joel McKinnon Miller) with filing documents. When she makes fun of them for sitting a lot, the two challenge her to see who can sit in their chair the longest. They end up staying in their chairs for over 32 hours before they agree to finally stand up, and Rosa gains a newfound respect for their surprising tenacity.

== Reception ==
=== Viewers ===
In its original American broadcast, "Bad Beat" was seen by an estimated 1.50 million household viewers and gained a 0.6/2 ratings share among adults aged 18–49, according to Nielsen Media Research. This was 12% decrease in viewership from the previous episode, which was watched by 1.69 million viewers with a 0.6/2 in the 18-49 demographics. This means that 0.6 percent of all households with televisions watched the episode, while 2 percent of all households watching television at that time watched it. With these ratings, Brooklyn Nine-Nine was the third highest rated show on FOX for the night, behind The Mick and Lethal Weapon, sixth on its timeslot and fifteenth for the night, behind The Mick, The Mayor, Kevin (Probably) Saves the World, The Flash, Law & Order True Crime, Fresh Off the Boat, Lethal Weapon, NCIS: New Orleans, Black-ish, Bull, The Middle, NCIS, The Voice, and This Is Us.

=== Critical reviews ===
"Bad Beat" received positive reviews from critics. LaToya Ferguson of The A.V. Club gave the episode a "B+" grade and wrote, "The follow-up episode to 'HalloVeen' was bound to face some added pressure, but 'Bad Beat' is luckily up for the task. It's not as mind-blowing or frantic as 'HalloVeen,' but it's another fulfilling episode in its own right. It's also another episode that fully utilizes every available cast member — even Dirk Blocker and Joel McKinnon Miller — as best as it possibly can, which is always a positive for Brooklyn Nine-Nine. And Brooklyn Nine-Nine is a show that knows how to use its positives."

Alan Sepinwall of Uproxx wrote, "'Bad Beat' put the show back in three-story mode, which isn't always its most effective (and something that's been less necessary during Gina's absence), but mostly worked here because the two subplots were intentionally slim. Rosa's silly wager with the two idiots about who could stay seated the longest worked as a nice contrast to the slightly more serious issue of gambling in the A-story, while also fitting Rosa's competitive spirit."
