= The Big House (Brooklyn Nine-Nine) =

- Brooklyn Nine-Nine episodes
- Episode nos.: Season 5 Episodes 1/2
- Directed by: Tristram Shapeero (Pt. 1); Michael McDonald (Pt. 2)
- Written by: Luke Del Tredici (Part 1); Justin Noble (Pt. 2)
- Cinematography by: Giovani Lampassi
- Editing by: Jason Gill (Pt. 1); Jeremy Reuben (Pt. 2)
- Production code: 501/502
- Original air dates: September 26, 2017 (Pt. 1); October 3, 2017 (Pt. 2)
- Running time: 44 minutes

Guest appearances
- Pt. 1: Tim Meadows as Caleb; Lou Diamond Phillips as Jeff Romero; Toby Huss as Warden Granville; Pt. 2: Tim Meadows as Caleb; Gina Gershon as Melanie Hawkins; Lou Diamond Phillips as Jeff Romero; Toby Huss as Warden Granville; Paul Adelstein as Seamus Murphy; Clayton English as Richard

Episode chronology
← Previous "Crime and Punishment"	Next → "Kicks"
- Brooklyn Nine-Nine season 5

"The Big House" is the season premiere of the fifth season of the American television police sitcom series Brooklyn Nine-Nine, consisting of the first and second episodes. They are also the 91st and 92nd overall episodes of the series. "Pt. 1" is written by series Luke Del Tredici and directed by Tristram Shapeero, and "Pt. 2" is written by Justin Noble and directed by Michael McDonald. The episodes aired on Fox in the United States with "Pt. 1" airing on September 26, 2017, and "Pt. 2" airing on October 3, 2017.

The show revolves around the fictitious 99th precinct of the New York Police Department in Brooklyn and the officers and detectives that work in the precinct. As part of an attempt to catch corrupt Lt. Melanie Hawkins, Jake and Rosa have been framed for her crimes and sentenced to prison. In the episodes, Jake works to find a viable way to get protection behind bars with the help of his cannibalistic cellmate. Rosa works to do whatever it takes to establish herself as someone not to be messed with while the rest of the precinct work to get new evidence and clear their friends' name.

According to Nielsen Media Research, "Pt. 1" was seen by an estimated 2.00 million household viewers and gained a 0.7/3 ratings share among adults aged 18–49, "Pt. 2" was seen by an estimated 1.74 million household viewers and gained a 0.6/2 ratings share among adults aged 18–49. The episodes received positive reviews from critics, who praised the cast's performances, the atmosphere and the writing.

== Plot ==
=== Pt. 1 ===
Months have passed since the last episode. Jake (Andy Samberg) and Rosa (Stephanie Beatriz) have been placed in different prisons. Jake's cellmate is Caleb (Tim Meadows), a cannibalistic serial killer while Rosa keeps sending messages for Adrian.

Wanting to get a cellphone to talk to Amy (Melissa Fumero), Jake smuggles Ramen noodles for an inmate, Romero (Lou Diamond Phillips), who gets him a cellphone. However, Warden Granville (Toby Huss) finds noodles in Jake's and Caleb's cell, and decides to move them from protective custody to gen-pop. Seeking protection, Jake asks Romero to join his gang, to which they agree if he can get a guard fired. Working with Caleb, Jake gets beaten by the guard as Caleb films him. However, Granville finds him with the phone. They get to a deal, to which Granville will give him back the phone and will fire the guard if he uses his connection to Romero for his benefit. Jake is welcomed into the gang but is told that he will be killed if he ever betrays them.

Meanwhile, Rosa uses her time of visits for Holt (Andre Braugher) and Terry (Terry Crews). Throughout the months, she asks them to deliver messages, ride her bike, and cancel her cable subscription. Despite trying their best to keep her spirits up, they grow tired of doing her activities and confront her. She eventually admits she hates being there and has to act ruthlessly to survive there.

=== Pt. 2 ===
Granville tells Jake to find information regarding the recent drug "Blizz", which is being exported throughout the prison and Romero seems to be behind it. Jake worries this will cost his life as Romero trusts very few people to tell them the secret.

Meanwhile, the precinct works in order to find Hawkins' (Gina Gershon) shipment of diamonds. Amy is approached by Seamus Murphy (Paul Adelstein), a mob boss with a vendetta against Hawkins, who will provide information to arrest Hawkins if she does a favor for him in return, which she refuses on Holt's instructions. Finding that Hawkins carries a Snapchat account to send messages, they have her visit Rosa while they hack into her account and find her next delivery. However, they fail to catch her as Hawkins saw them coming.

Jake and Caleb find that Romero uses the showers to transfer the drug but Jake accidentally uses it and it turns out to be methamphetamine. However, this earns him Romero's respect, who tells him he uses the soaps to transfer it. Jake tells it to Granville but finds that Romero will kill him, as he's the only other person who knows. Caleb tries to defend him but is stabbed. Then, he and Rosa are freed as Holt found that the pigs used by Hawkin's accomplice were used to hide the diamonds, and Hawkins has been arrested. As Hawkins is arrested, Jake and Rosa are released from the prison and are reunited with the squad. However, Holt is revealed to have asked Murphy for the information, costing Holt a favor he will owe to Murphy.

== Reception ==
=== Viewers ===
==== Pt. 1 ====
In its original American broadcast, "The Big House Pt. 1" was seen by an estimated 2.00 million household viewers and gained a 0.7/3 ratings share among adults aged 18–49, according to Nielsen Media Research. This was 33% increase in viewership from the previous episode, which was watched by 1.50 million viewers with a 0.6/2 in the 18–49 demographics. This means that 0.7 percent of all households with televisions watched the episode, while 3 percent of all households watching television at that time watched it. With these ratings, Brooklyn Nine-Nine was the third highest rated show on FOX for the night, behind The Mick and Lethal Weapon, fifth on its timeslot and eleventh for the night, behind The Mick, NCIS: New Orleans, Lethal Weapon, Dancing with the Stars, Celebrity Family Feud, Bull, Law & Order True Crime, NCIS, The Voice, and This Is Us.

==== Pt. 2 ====
In its original American broadcast, "The Big House Pt. 2" was seen by an estimated 1.74 million household viewers and gained a 0.6/2 ratings share among adults aged 18–49, according to Nielsen Media Research. This was 13% decrease in viewership from the previous episode, which was watched by 2.00 million viewers with a 0.7/3 in the 18–49 demographics. This means that 0.6 percent of all households with televisions watched the episode, while 2 percent of all households watching television at that time watched it. With these ratings, Brooklyn Nine-Nine was the third highest rated show on FOX for the night, behind The Mick and Lethal Weapon, sixth on its timeslot and fourteenth for the night, behind The Mick, Kevin (Probably) Saves the World, NCIS: New Orleans, Lethal Weapon, Law & Order True Crime, The Mayor, Bull, Fresh Off the Boat, NCIS, Black-ish, The Middle, The Voice, and This Is Us.

=== Critical reviews ===
==== Pt. 1 ====
"The Big House Pt. 1" received positive reviews from critics. LaToya Ferguson of The A.V. Club gave the episode a "B" grade and wrote, "'The Big House, Pt. 1' is a nice return back to the world of Brooklyn Nine-Nine and one that feels more in tune with the show as a whole than the season four finale did. It certainly helps to know that Hawkins' omniscience — or at least her ability to pin her crimes on Jake and Rosa — will end soon. With this episode, even with the change of scenery, Brooklyn Nine-Nine thankfully still feels like itself."

Alan Sepinwall of Uproxx wrote, "It's now a tradition for Brooklyn to end each season with a cliffhanger that removes one or more cops from the Nine-Nine, and also a tradition for the next season to undo it within a few episodes. Jake and Rosa's incarceration seems like it may be trickier to undo than others — especially since the premiere suggests Santiago, Boyle, and the others have hit a dead end in trying to exonerate them — but I'm hopeful it doesn't last too long, because this temporary status quo really pushes up against the show's tonal limits."

==== Pt. 2 ====
"The Big House Pt. 2" received positive reviews from critics. LaToya Ferguson of The A.V. Club gave the episode a "C+" grade and wrote, "'The Big House, Pt. 2' never quite hits the highs or level of poignancy as the previous episode, and it struggles to make the entire story ever feel 'worth it.' While 'Pt. 1' had the specific task of showing the audience the temporary new normal for Brooklyn Nine-Nine, 'Pt. 2' has the even harder task of finally figuring out how to get these characters out of this world. And as it does so, it only brings more attention to just what was wrong with the story in the first place — while adding some other stumbling blocks into the fray."

Alan Sepinwall of Uproxx wrote, "Sometimes, Brooklyn does well when it goes to a slightly darker place, sometimes not. I didn't love all the cannibal and castration jokes of Jake's prison stint, but if there's an actor on this show — hell, if there's an actor on this planet — equipped to thread the needle between drama and comedy, it's Braugher. Mainly, though, I'm glad to have all the cops back in the precinct together."
