= Show Me Going =

- Brooklyn Nine-Nine episode
- Episode no.: Season 5 Episode 20
- Directed by: Maggie Carey
- Written by: Phil Augusta Jackson
- Cinematography by: Giovani Lampassi
- Editing by: Jeremy Reuben
- Production code: 520
- Original air date: May 6, 2018
- Running time: 21 minutes

Guest appearances
- Natasha Rothwell as Della Alvarado; Akiva Schaffer as Brett Booth

Episode chronology
← Previous "Bachelor/ette Party"	Next → "White Whale"
- Brooklyn Nine-Nine season 5

"Show Me Going" is the 20th episode of the fifth season of the American television police sitcom series Brooklyn Nine-Nine, and the 110th overall episode of the series. The episode was written by Phil Augusta Jackson and directed by Maggie Carey. It aired on Fox in the United States on May 6, 2018. The episode features guest appearances from Natasha Rothwell and Akiva Schaffer, with a cameo appearance from Ryan Paevey.

The show revolves around the fictitious 99th precinct of the New York Police Department in Brooklyn and the officers and detectives that work in the precinct. In the episode, there's an active shooting in a hotel and is reported that Rosa is near the location and is called to help, which begins worrying the precinct for her safety. Jake intends to help her but Holt refuses to let him leave the building. Meanwhile, Terry faces an existential crisis, and Gina and Amy try to make themselves useful by fixing Rosa's broken toilet.

According to Nielsen Media Research, the episode was seen by an estimated 1.67 million household viewers and gained a 0.7/3 ratings share among adults aged 18–49. The episode received critical acclaim, who praised the psychology behind the cope with hopelessness in the episode and acting from the cast.

== Plot ==
In the cold open, Holt tries a new look with a red bowler hat and blue trench coat, stunning everyone in the office.

Jake Peralta (Andy Samberg) and Charles Boyle (Joe Lo Truglio) try to get places on a multi-agency, multi-state task force. However, Jake previously injured the task force head (Akiva Schaffer) in the police academy, so the two are forced to return to the precinct. There, they learn that a shooting near a hotel is taking place and Rosa Diaz (Stephanie Beatriz) is near the scene. She responds to dispatch "Show Me Going", indicating that she is responding to the scene.

The squad is told to remain in the precinct and continue their jobs, per the Commissioner's orders. However, Jake is intent on going to help Rosa but Raymond Holt (Andre Braugher) strictly tells him not to leave the building. During this, Terry Jeffords (Terry Crews) begins experiencing an existential crisis and tries to up his life insurance policy, calling in a nurse to take his blood pressure. Amy Santiago (Melissa Fumero) and Gina Linetti (Chelsea Peretti) decide to fix the broken women's toilet on their floor but end up breaking the pipelines.

With help from Boyle, Hitchcock (Dirk Blocker) and Scully (Joel McKinnon Miller), Jake gets weapons from the armory, faking Holt's voice for permission and proceeds to leave the building. However, Holt catches him and tells him that he has to remain to help the others, who are also worried about Rosa's status. Jake still leaves in his car but instead of helping Rosa, he comes back with pizzas for the precinct to calm them down. This even brings down Terry's blood pressure. An hour later, Rosa returns safely and she is welcomed into the precinct. Gina shows her the broken toilet as Amy returns, and the three hug.

== Reception ==
=== Viewers ===
In its original American broadcast, "Show Me Going" was seen by an estimated 1.67 million household viewers and gained a 0.7/3 ratings share among adults aged 18–49, according to Nielsen Media Research. This was 16% decrease in viewership from the previous episode, which was watched by 1.97 million viewers with a 0.9/4 in the 18-49 demographics. This means that 0.7 percent of all households with televisions watched the episode, while 3 percent of all households watching television at that time watched it. With these ratings, Brooklyn Nine-Nine was the third highest rated show on FOX for the night, beating The Last Man on Earth and Bob's Burgers but behind Family Guy and The Simpsons, fourth on its timeslot and ninth for the night, behind Deception, Instinct, NCIS: Los Angeles, 60 Minutes, Family Guy, The Simpsons, America's Funniest Home Videos, and American Idol.

=== Critical reviews ===
"Show Me Going" received critical acclaim from critics. LaToya Ferguson of The A.V. Club gave the episode an "A−" grade and wrote, "Despite working a stripped down version of Brooklyn Nine-Nine, 'The Box' was an episode that featured an excellent balance of humor and a more police-centric, serious tone. 'Show Me Going' goes for a similar approach too — in terms of the balance — albeit doing so with the help of the entire ensemble this time. And while 'Show Me Going' doesn't quite hit the highs of 'The Box,' it is rather exciting to see Brooklyn Nine-Nine go back to this creative well again relatively soon. It's also pretty tense, to be perfectly honest. In fact, according to Brooklyn Nine-Nine showrunner Dan Goor, this episode was somewhat of a puzzle for the writers room to solve, especially as they worked to make sure it was 'funny, but still impactful.' I'd say they succeeded in that mission."
