= NutriBoom =

- Brooklyn Nine-Nine episode
- Episode no.: Season 5 Episode 16
- Directed by: Trent O'Donnell
- Written by: David Phillips
- Cinematography by: Giovani Lampassi
- Editing by: Jason Gill
- Production code: 515
- Original air date: April 15, 2018
- Running time: 21 minutes

Guest appearances
- Jay Chandrasekhar as himself; Winston Story as Bill; Drew Tarver as Gary Jennings

Episode chronology
← Previous "The Puzzle Master"	Next → "DFW"
- Brooklyn Nine-Nine season 5

"NutriBoom" is the 16th episode of the fifth season of the American television police sitcom series Brooklyn Nine-Nine, and the 106th overall episode of the series. The episode was written by David Phillips and directed by Trent O'Donnell. It aired on Fox in the United States on April 15, 2018, airing back-to-back with the next episode, "DFW". The episode features guest appearances from Jay Chandrasekhar, Winston Story, and Drew Tarver.

The show revolves around the fictitious 99th precinct of the New York Police Department in Brooklyn and the officers and detectives that work in the precinct. In the episode, Jake Peralta (Andy Samberg) and Charles Boyle (Joe Lo Truglio) infiltrate pyramid scheme NutriBoom when it refuses to end Jake's contract that will cost him tens of thousands of dollars, in an attempt to find information regarding the shady part of the company. Meanwhile, Amy Santiago (Melissa Fumero) begins her course as Sergeant, but has to deal with an officer that reminds her of herself from her early days.

According to Nielsen Media Research, the episode was seen by an estimated 1.74 million household viewers and gained a 0.8/3 ratings share among adults aged 18–49. The episode received positive reviews from critics, who praised the writing, cold open, and Lo Truglio's performance.

== Plot ==
In the cold open, Jake sets up an elaborate trap to get a pigeon to fly out of the office, only to have it backfire immediately when the pigeon flies into a fan.

Jake Peralta (Andy Samberg) is visited by Bill (Winston Story), the NutriBoom representative that made him sign the contract, who reminds him of his contract. Tired of NutriBoom, Jake and Charles Boyle (Joe Lo Truglio) decide to face the heads of NutriBoom.

At the headquarters, Jake is notified that he has to pay $10,000 to end the contract or be a benefactor for the company, which he refuses. They decide to infiltrate NutriBoom to find evidence behind the possible homicide of the CEO David Stovelman's wife Debbie, with the help of comedian and filmmaker Jay Chandrasekhar (playing himself), who is forced to be the face of NutriBoom's ads. However, they find that Debbie (Kate Butler) is alive and secretly running the organization, having paid a private company to make her disappear and avoid federal investigation. She taunts Jake that the company has no actual proof of their activities and that she will never be arrested. She bribes him to back down, but he refuses and reports her to the FBI. NutriBoom starts surveilling Jake and Amy Santiago (Melissa Fumero) to intimidate them.

Meanwhile, Amy officially becomes Sergeant and begins her course by teaching new recruits on the precinct. However, she finds one of the recruits, Gary Jennings (Drew Tarver) very annoying and an upbeat overachiever. Seeing that he is a version of herself during her early days, Amy tries different ways to avoid Gary, to no success. She consults Rosa Diaz (Stephanie Beatriz), Terry Jeffords (Terry Crews), and Gina Linetti (Chelsea Peretti) for further suggestions, but they all fail or backfire. Raymond Holt (Andre Braugher) advises her to listen to Gary's ideas, like he did with her. Eventually, Amy apologizes to Gary for her behavior and decides to listen to him more.

== Reception ==
=== Viewers ===
In its original American broadcast, "NutriBoom" was seen by an estimated 1.79 million household viewers and gained a 0.8/3 ratings share among adults aged 18–49, according to Nielsen Media Research. This was slight increase in viewership from the previous episode, which was watched by 1.74 million viewers with a 0.8/3 in the 18-49 demographics. This means that 0.8 percent of all households with televisions watched the episode, while 3 percent of all households watching television at that time watched it. With these ratings, Brooklyn Nine-Nine was the third highest rated show on FOX for the night, beating The Last Man on Earth, but behind Bob's Burgers and The Simpsons, fifth on its timeslot and ninth for the night, behind Little Big Shots, Bob's Burgers, The Simpsons, 60 Minutes, America's Funniest Home Videos, American Idol, a James Comey interview, and the 53rd Academy of Country Music Awards.

=== Critical reviews ===
"NutriBoom" received positive reviews from critics. LaToya Ferguson of The A.V. Club gave the episode a "B+" grade and wrote, "Obviously, 'NutriBoom' proves that line of thinking wrong. Somewhere in between the levels of Brooklyn Nine-Nine bringing Jake's Addams Family rap back in 'The Box' and announcing the results of Amy's Sergeant exam in 'The Puzzle Master' is 'NutriBoom.' And looking back now, it actually makes sense Brooklyn Nine-Nine would go back to that little pyramid scheme. After all, the Halloween Heist episodes have reached a point where the Nine-Nine crew is so consumed by the competition that they certainly wouldn't stop during it to investigate something as troubling as NutriBoom at the time. Keep in mind, 'HalloVeen' even included the bit about the founder's wife being happy and healthy, a red flag that this episode acknowledges."

Alan Sepinwall of Uproxx wrote, "The NutriBoom case, meanwhile, was a reminder of what a deep bench of recurring characters the series has created, essentially generating an entire A-story out of how Bill, the Boyle doppelganger Jake employees for the Halloween heists, is even sadder and creepier than the real Boyle. It's a nice reward to Winston Story for turning his resemblance to Joe Lo Truglio into a funny character in its own right, and having a cross between Scientology and a pyramid scheme as Jake's new recurring nemesis fits the show better tonally than the gangsters and crooked cops Brooklyn has tried so often in the past."
