= Two Turkeys =

- Brooklyn Nine-Nine episode
- Episode no.: Season 5 Episode 7
- Directed by: Alex Reid
- Written by: David Phillips
- Cinematography by: Giovani Lampassi
- Editing by: Jeremy Reuben
- Production code: 507
- Original air date: November 21, 2017
- Running time: 21 minutes

Guest appearances
- Katey Sagal as Karen Peralta; Jimmy Smits as Victor Santiago; Bradley Whitford as Roger Peralta; Bertila Damas as Camila Santiago; Marc Evan Jackson as Kevin Cozner

Episode chronology
← Previous "The Venue"	Next → "Return to Skyfire"
- Brooklyn Nine-Nine season 5

"Two Turkeys" is the 7th episode of the fifth season of the American television police sitcom series Brooklyn Nine-Nine, and the 97th overall episode of the series. The episode was written by David Phillips and directed by Alex Reid. It aired on Fox in the United States on November 21, 2017.

The show revolves around the fictitious 99th precinct of the New York Police Department in Brooklyn and the officers and detectives that work in the precinct. In the episode, Jake and Amy organize a Thanksgiving dinner with their families but the dinner soon descends into a fight between their fathers. Meanwhile, Holt's and Kevin's pie disappears and Holt has Hitchcock and Scully investigate it.

According to Nielsen Media Research, the episode was seen by an estimated 1.66 million household viewers and gained a 0.6/2 ratings share among adults aged 18–49. The episode received positive reviews from critics, who praised the chemistry, heartwarming tone, Smits', Jackson's and Whitford's guest performances in the episode, and Holt's storyline.

== Plot ==
In the cold open, Boyle dons his "Tommy Gobbler" costume once again, only to accidentally get his costume's tail feathers stuck in the elevator.

On Thanksgiving, Jake (Andy Samberg) and Amy (Melissa Fumero) are working on setting a dinner with their families to meet, hoping nothing goes wrong at his mother's house.

At Karen's (Katey Sagal) house, Jake introduces his parents to Amy's parents, Victor (Jimmy Smits) and Camila (Bertila Damas), who brought an additional turkey. As the evening shows no progress, Jake gives Roger (Bradley Whitford) and Victor more wine, but both end up drunk. At dinner, Roger and Victor get into a fight over their social status and compete to see who can finish carving the turkey first, which ends with Roger accidentally cutting his thumb off. At the hospital, Roger and Victor solve their issues and settle on splitting the costs of the wedding evenly.

Meanwhile, Holt (Andre Braugher) and Kevin (Marc Evan Jackson) bring an English Walnut pie from Saratoga Springs they plan to give to Kevin's family. However, the pie goes missing and Holt suspects Rosa (Stephanie Beatriz), Boyle (Joe Lo Truglio) and Terry (Terry Crews) of eating it and asks Hitchcock (Dirk Blocker) and Scully (Joel McKinnon Miller) to find it as they're experts on the matter. While Holt exposes all three of them for lying about what they were doing for Thanksgiving, he finds that none of them actually stole the pie. They eventually discover the pie in the trash, and Holt learns that Kevin himself threw it out as he hates the pie as he finds it disgusting and only enjoys getting it with Raymond because he likes spending time with him upstate. Holt suggests in the future they can just go to Saratoga Springs without getting the pie.

== Reception ==
=== Viewers ===
In its original American broadcast, "Two Turkeys" was seen by an estimated 1.66 million household viewers and gained a 0.6/2 ratings share among adults aged 18–49, according to Nielsen Media Research. This was slight increase in viewership from the previous episode, which was watched by 1.65 million viewers with a 0.6/2 in the 18-49 demographics. This means that 0.6 percent of all households with televisions watched the episode, while 2 percent of all households watching television at that time watched it. With these ratings, Brooklyn Nine-Nine was the third highest rated show on FOX for the night, behind The Mick and Lethal Weapon, fifth on its timeslot and thirteenth for the night, behind The Mick, The Flash, NCIS: New Orleans, Lethal Weapon, Fresh Off the Boat, Bull, The Middle, Chicago Med, Dancing with the Stars, NCIS, The Voice, and This Is Us.

=== Critical reviews ===
"Two Turkeys" received positive reviews from critics. LaToya Ferguson of The A.V. Club gave the episode a "B+" grade and wrote, "This week's 'Two Turkeys' is more on par with that higher level, which isn't always easy for a show to do when its main directive is to simply do a 'holiday episode.' Still, 'Two Turkeys' gets it done in more ways than just Thanksgiving jokes. It's also a more realistic (for these characters) look at the baggage Jake and Amy each be bringing into their marriage, as it's the one where their parents will meet each other before officially becoming family."

Alan Sepinwall of Uproxx wrote, "'Two Turkeys' is perhaps the most guest star-driven installment of the entire series, with large swaths of it feeling less like a Brooklyn Nine-Nine episode than the backdoor pilot for a spin-off about Jake and Amy's fathers. But when those fathers happen to be played by Bradley Whitford and Jimmy Smits — the two of them enjoying both the late-stage West Wing reunion and the opportunity to play increasingly petty and drunk — with Katey Sagal also around to stir up trouble, it's maybe okay to turn the lead couple into horrified observers for once."
