= Gray Star Mutual =

- Brooklyn Nine-Nine episode
- Episode no.: Season 5 Episode 18
- Directed by: Giovani Lampassi
- Written by: Jessica Polonsky
- Cinematography by: Giovani Lampassi
- Editing by: Jason Gill
- Production code: 517
- Original air date: April 22, 2018
- Running time: 21 minutes

Guest appearances
- Jason Mantzoukas as Adrian Pimento

Episode chronology
← Previous "DFW"	Next → "Bachelor/ette Party"
- Brooklyn Nine-Nine season 5

"Gray Star Mutual" is the 18th episode of the fifth season of the American television police sitcom series Brooklyn Nine-Nine, and the 108th overall episode of the series. The episode was written by Jessica Polonsky and directed by Giovani Lampassi. It aired on Fox in the United States on April 22, 2018. The episode features a guest appearance from Jason Mantzoukas reprising his role as Adrian Pimento.

The show revolves around the fictitious 99th precinct of the New York Police Department in Brooklyn and the officers and detectives that work in the precinct. In the episode, Jake Peralta (Andy Samberg) and Charles Boyle (Joe Lo Truglio) find Adrian Pimento (Jason Mantzoukas) working as an insurance claim investigator when Boyle's truck burns down. However, Adrian turns against them when he finds all the events he missed. Meanwhile, Amy Santiago (Melissa Fumero) thinks that shopping for her wedding dress would make her look weak to her subordinates, so Rosa Diaz (Stephanie Beatriz) helps her choose the right dress while instilling a sense of confidence within her. Terry Jeffords (Terry Crews) and Gina Linetti (Chelsea Peretti) try to have Captain Raymond Holt (Andre Braugher) set up a Twitter account to increase his social media presence.

According to Nielsen Media Research, the episode was seen by an estimated 1.77 million household viewers and gained a 0.8/3 ratings share among adults aged 18–49. The episode received generally positive reviews from critics, who praised Mantzoukas's performance and the Rosa–Amy subplot.

== Plot ==
Jake (Andy Samberg) accompanies Boyle (Joe Lo Truglio) to help on his food truck and they leave for drinks. When they return, they find the truck has been burned down and call the insurance company Gray Star Mutual. To their surprise, the investigator turns out to be Adrian (Jason Mantzoukas).

Adrian's behavior on the investigation worsens when he finds all the events he missed while he was gone and while accusing Boyle of being his own arsonist, he denies the insurance claim. Jake and Boyle then decide to file a complaint with the company against Adrian. Adrian finds out and locks himself with them, threatening them. They eventually reconcile but Adrian gets fired and the claim is dismissed. With the help of Adrian, Jake and Boyle track down one of Boyle's former employees who is responsible for the fire.

Meanwhile, Amy (Melissa Fumero) thinks that shopping for her wedding dress would make her look weak to her subordinates, so Rosa (Stephanie Beatriz) helps her choose the right dress while instilling a sense of confidence within her. Amy uses the dress while chasing a perp, which makes her feel confident. Also, Terry (Terry Crews) and Gina (Chelsea Peretti) convince Holt (Andre Braugher) to create a Twitter account to gain attention for the New York City Police Commissioner position. However, Holt quits Twitter after his account is suspended for being supposedly a bot. One of the candidates for Commissioner turns out to be disqualified, leaving three captains as the front-runners.

== Reception ==
=== Viewers ===
In its original American broadcast, "Gray Star Mutual" was seen by an estimated 1.77 million household viewers and gained a 0.8/3 ratings share among adults aged 18–49, according to Nielsen Media Research. This was 19% increase in viewership from the previous episode, which was watched by 1.48 million viewers with a 0.7/3 in the 18-49 demographics. This means that 0.8 percent of all households with televisions watched the episode, while 3 percent of all households watching television at that time watched it. With these ratings, Brooklyn Nine-Nine was the third highest rated show on FOX for the night, beating The Last Man on Earth and Bob's Burgers but behind Family Guy and The Simpsons, fourth on its timeslot and seventh for the night, behind Little Big Shots, NCIS: Los Angeles, Family Guy, The Simpsons, America's Funniest Home Videos, and American Idol.

=== Critical reviews ===
"Gray Star Mutual" received generally positive reviews from critics. LaToya Ferguson of The A.V. Club gave the episode a "B−" grade and wrote, "'Gray Star Mutual' is the Brooklyn Nine-Nine episode to come after the one-two punch of a corporate conspiracy set on destroying Jake's (and Boyle's!) life and Jake's long-lost half-sister. So in a way, it makes sense for it to be a chill, cool down episode. But when you consider that this is also an episode with arson, Amy shopping for a wedding dress, and Captain Raymond Holt on Twitter, there's definitely an expectation for something bigger. Unfortunately, while those are all solid jumping off points, in execution, they're all mostly just that. There are set-ups for some really great plots in this episode, but for one reason or another, they don't get to live up to that greatness."
