= Return to Skyfire =

- Brooklyn Nine-Nine episode
- Episode no.: Season 5 Episode 8
- Directed by: Linda Mendoza
- Written by: Neil Campbell
- Cinematography by: Giovani Lampassi
- Editing by: Jason Gill
- Production code: 508
- Original air date: November 28, 2017
- Running time: 21 minutes

Guest appearances
- Fred Melamed as D.C. Parlov; Reggie Lee as Ronald Yee; Rob Huebel as Landon Lawson

Episode chronology
| ← Previous "Two Turkeys" | Next → "99" |
- Brooklyn Nine-Nine season 5

"Return to Skyfire" is the 8th episode of the fifth season of the American television police sitcom series Brooklyn Nine-Nine, and the 98th overall episode of the series. The episode was written by Neil Campbell and directed by Linda Mendoza. It aired on Fox in the United States on November 28, 2017.

The show revolves around the fictitious 99th precinct of the New York Police Department in Brooklyn and the officers and detectives that work in the precinct. In the episode, Jake, Terry and Rosa meet with D.C. Parlov again after his manuscript for his next book has been stolen and Jake pressures Terry to show a novel he wrote to Parlov. Meanwhile, Holt, Amy and Boyle attend a forensics course with disastrous results.

According to Nielsen Media Research, the episode was seen by an estimated 1.73 million household viewers and gained a 0.7/3 ratings share among adults aged 18–49. The episode received mixed reviews from critics, who praised the performances, particularly Crews, but criticized the rehashed storyline and Boyle's subplot.

== Plot ==
Jake (Andy Samberg) and Terry (Terry Crews) convince Rosa (Stephanie Beatriz) to investigate a case related to D.C. Parlov (Fred Melamed), the Skyfire Cycle author who got his latest manuscript stolen and partially leaked on the Internet. The culprit is blackmailing Parlov into giving $500,000 to prevent the release of the rest of the book. Despite a previous negative encounter with Parlov, Jake became a fan of the series after reading the books in jail while Terry discovered that he seemed to be a nice person. They go undercover as cosplayers at the fantasy convention where Parlov is speaking, with Rosa reluctantly participating by dressing in her usual attire, which resembles a character from a steampunk novel.

At the convention, they find that Parlov's rival, Landon Lawson (Rob Huebel), also had his manuscript stolen and the two authors accuse each other of stealing the manuscript. During this, Jake finds that Terry wrote a fantasy novel and has Parlov take a look at it, but finds that the novel is terrible. When Parlov compliments Terry's novel, Jake and Rosa find that he's lying and that both Parlov and Lawson stole each other's manuscript to get more attention. They end up arresting both and Jake reassures Terry after finding out that Parlov found his novel terrible. Meanwhile, Rosa unexpectedly becomes a fan of the steampunk novel.

Meanwhile, Holt (Andre Braugher) and Amy (Melissa Fumero) attend a forensics course by Dr. Ronald Yee (Reggie Lee) with the hope that their performance can get them a field lab in the precinct. However, they are forced to submit Boyle (Joe Lo Truglio) as well, who can't keep digressing on anecdotes about his family on any subject. They use him as the cast subject to keep him from talking but accidentally forget to lubricate it, trapping him in the cast. After struggling to keep him quiet, they return to the course for help, with no chance of getting the lab.

== Reception ==
=== Viewers ===
In its original American broadcast, "Return to Skyfire" was seen by an estimated 1.73 million household viewers and gained a 0.7/3 ratings share among adults aged 18–49, according to Nielsen Media Research. This was slight increase in viewership from the previous episode, which was watched by 1.66 million viewers with a 0.6/2 in the 18-49 demographics. This means that 0.7 percent of all households with televisions watched the episode, while 3 percent of all households watching television at that time watched it. With these ratings, Brooklyn Nine-Nine was the third highest rated show on FOX for the night, behind The Mick and Lethal Weapon, fifth on its timeslot and twelfth for the night, behind The Mick, a rerun of The Middle, Legends of Tomorrow, The Flash, Lethal Weapon, a rerun of NCIS, Chicago Med, Victoria's Secret Fashion Show, The Voice, Rudolph the Red-Nosed Reindeer, and This Is Us.

=== Critical reviews ===
"Return to Skyfire" received mixed reviews from critics. LaToya Ferguson of The A.V. Club gave the episode a "C−" grade and wrote, "Since Jake and Rosa's return to the precinct, Brooklyn Nine-Nine has worked hard to solidly remind the audience just how strong the bonds of the Nine-Nine are, whether they're tested in competition, relapse, business ventures, Butt-lympics, or even pastry-based mysteries. 'Return To Skyfire,' however, is something of an outlier to all of these episodes. It doesn't quite belong, and compared to the episodes before it, it lacks the same solid reminder of how strong the Nine-Nine is together. Or Brooklyn Nine-Nine is at all."

Alan Sepinwall of Uproxx wrote, "Too much of the DC Parlov story felt like a rehash of jokes from the first one, like characters speaking in unison at great length while discussing details from the books, and the scene where Jake and Terry inadvertently broke up a family felt mean and awkward in a way that doesn't fit the general tone of this show. Parts worked just because of the sheer enthusiasm of Samberg and Crews, and/or the interlocking sounds of Fred Melamed and Rob Huebel's voices (particularly when Parlov and Lawson debated the proper pronunciation of 'Smaug'), but it felt very much like diminishing returns on the original concept."
