= Rosa Diaz =

American television character

- Brooklyn Nine-Nine character
- Stephanie Beatriz as Rosa Diaz
- First appearance: "Pilot"; Brooklyn Nine-Nine; September 17, 2013
- Last appearance: "The Last Day"; Brooklyn Nine-Nine; September 16, 2021
- Created by: Dan Goor; Michael Schur
- Portrayed by: Stephanie Beatriz

In-universe information
- Occupation: NYPD Police Detective (seasons 1–7); Private Investigator (season 8)
- Family: Oscar Diaz (father); Julia Diaz (mother)
- Significant others: Marcus (Season 2); Adrian Pimento (seasons 3–4); Jocelyn Price (season 6)

Rosalita (Rosa) Diaz is a fictional character portrayed by Stephanie Beatriz in Brooklyn Nine-Nine, an American police procedural comedy. She was originally created under the name "Megan" but changed to Rosa when Stephanie Beatriz got the part over Chelsea Peretti, who would go on to portray Gina Linetti. Beatriz and her co-star, Melissa Fumero, were worried both before and after casting about losing their roles; as Latina actresses, both saw it as unusual that they were cast in the same network television show. Rosa became Beatriz's breakthrough role.

Rosa's regular costume features a black leather jacket, somewhat curly hair, and a low voice, as well as her gun. This inspiration for this style came from spaghetti Western films that Beatriz watched; she described the style she was going for as a "robot-cowboy" look. Rosa's character is serious, confident, and frequently angry; she is closed-off and does not share details about her personal life, although the audience gets glimpses into her past at various points. These glimpses point towards an extremely worldly past, one that is not universally accepted as true by critics.

In the fifth season, Rosa comes out as bisexual – this was considered a major revelation for her character, given her consistent desire for privacy. Her storyline in coming out was significantly shaped by Beatriz, herself a bisexual actress. Rosa was received positively by reviewers, with particular praise for her positive representation of bisexuality. For her performance as Rosa Diaz, Beatriz won two Gracie Awards and one Imagen Award during the show's eight-season run.

== Creation ==
=== Casting ===
The character of Rosa Diaz was initially created under the name "Megan", described as "tough, smart, and scary as hell". Chelsea Peretti read for the role of Megan, but she would eventually have the character of Gina Linetti created for her instead. Stephanie Beatriz auditioned for the show, initially reading for the role of Brooklyn Nine-Nine's Amy Santiago; it was casting director Allison Jones who suggested that Beatriz read for Megan instead. Beatriz tested for both roles, but when she learned that Fox cast Melissa Fumero for the role of Amy, Beatriz thought that she had no chance, reasoning that Fox would not cast two Latinas in the same show:

I was so excited for Melissa, but I thought I was screwed. Because growing up and watching shows, I would just never see Latina characters. Everyone was white. If there was Latinas, they were at the margins. Or playing stereotypes.

Beatriz was eventually given the role, causing Brooklyn Nine-Nine creators Michael Schur and Dan Goor to change the name of the character to Rosa Diaz in search of a name less intense and more "flowery". According to Fumero, even after being cast, both she and Beatriz feared that one of them would get fired – both found it highly unlikely that two Latina actresses were cast in the same network television show in the first place.

=== Costume ===
Rosa's character makes heavy use of black clothing, including her signature black leather jacket and curly hair, as well as her low voice. In the first season, Rosa's costume also features several pieces of police equipment attached to her belt; Beatriz said she had spoken to several real-life women detectives who deplored that style for how heavy it was, and wanted to try it for herself. The weight of Rosa's belt caused bruises for Beatriz; in later seasons, Rosa switched to having a holster underneath her arm.

Stephanie Beatriz told The New York Times that she drew inspiration for her character's costume from Spaghetti Western films. She commented that the archetypal characters from those films, with a look she referred to as a "robot-cowboy" style, influenced her perception when she was first considering the character of Rosa. Beatriz recalled that when she attended her first costume fitting for the character, she simply quipped, "I think it’s a lot of black." Melissa Fumero told Parents that because of her and Beatriz's fear of being fired, they privately agreed to distance their characters' styles from each other, with Amy adopting straight hair while Rosa made hers more curly.

Beatriz also told the Chicago Tribune that she had to change her regular outfits when she began to portray Rosa, because they were too similar; she said that she now wears glasses and has changed her hairstyle, making her less easily recognizable.

== Character role ==
=== Traits and backstory ===
Rosa is generally portrayed as rigid, confident, and intense. Regarding Rosa's stony nature, Beatriz remarked that "in comedy you have the 'straight man', who’s basically the deadpan, flat comedy partner... and in Brooklyn Nine-Nine, the bi woman is a straight man, which is hilarious". She also is shown to be prone to angry outbursts; in the first episode of the third season, Rosa vents by obliterating machinery with a hammer. However, Rosa is also shown to be a resilient and capable detective, described by GQ as a "protective family housecat". Though her character would not come out as bisexual until the fifth season, Beatriz stated that she always quietly played her character as someone who would date in any gender.

Rosa's guarded nature makes her backstory sparse and vague, hiding most details from the other characters as well as the audience. Details of Rosa's life are mentioned at times; she is, at various points, known to have obtained a pilot's license, gone to medical school, rented an apartment under the fake name of Emily Goldfinch, gone through the juvenile detention system, and been expelled from dance academy for assaulting ballerinas. When Rosa came out as bisexual, Dan Goor quipped that "over the last six seasons, Rosa has gone from being an enigma whom people knew nothing about, to an enigma whom people now know an incredibly tiny amount about". It is also hinted at some intervals that Rosa has lived in a broad set of cities and countries.

Writing for Comic Book Resources, Ian Goodwillie estimates that Rosa was approaching the age of 40 by the end of the show's eight-season run. Goodwillie casts doubt on the veracity of some of the details of her backstory, noting that Rosa's willingness to lie about her name in renting an apartment shakes confidence in the notion that she had lived such an eventful past life.

=== Sexuality ===
Writing for The New York Times in 2019, Ilana Kaplan remarked that Rosa's serious and harsh character was the "emotional antithesis" of Beatriz, who Kaplan referred to as "generally bubbly". However, Beatriz does say that she sees some of Rosa's intensity and candor in herself, and she helped shape the revelation of her character's bisexuality onscreen. Beatriz came out as queer in a 2016 tweet, fueling fan speculation and hope that Rosa could be revealed to be queer as well; Beatriz more recently self-identified as bisexual. She recounted to Variety that she was asked by Dan Goor if she would want Rosa to be bisexual. Beatriz later remarked that she was "thrilled by it", and that she wanted Rosa to serve as a positive example for teenagers and young adults as a bisexual character, a category she thought severely lacked representation. Beatriz shared her experiences of coming out with the writers, including the pushback she sometimes received, to lend her authenticity to the character.

Rosa's bisexuality is first revealed in 2017 in the ninth episode of Brooklyn Nine-Nine's fifth season, "99"; when Charles Boyle begins to cajole her about her dating life after her relationship with Adrian Pimento ended, she comes out to him with a gruff "I'm dating a woman. I'm bi". Erin Nyren with Variety noted that given Rosa's personal reticence, her decision to share such a personal aspect of her identity carried more emotional weight than it would have from another character. While Ilana Kaplan wrote that Rosa "will continue to slowly let her co-workers into her life" as the show progressed from her coming out, Patrick Kellheller with PinkNews opined that Rosa's personality did not change following the storyline.

Palmer Haasch with Polygon reported a statement from Dan Goor, claiming that Rosa's declaration, "I'm bi", was the first time the phrase had been used on network television. Haash, however, contradicted the claim: At least two prior shows, Grey's Anatomy and Crazy Ex-Girlfriend, had used the phrase as well, although she argued that Goor's statement still drew necessary attention to the rarity of bisexual representation onscreen. According to The Washington Post, queer fans of color were quick to note that Fox's cancellation of Brooklyn Nine-Nine came one day after Rosa came out on the show.

== Reception and impact ==
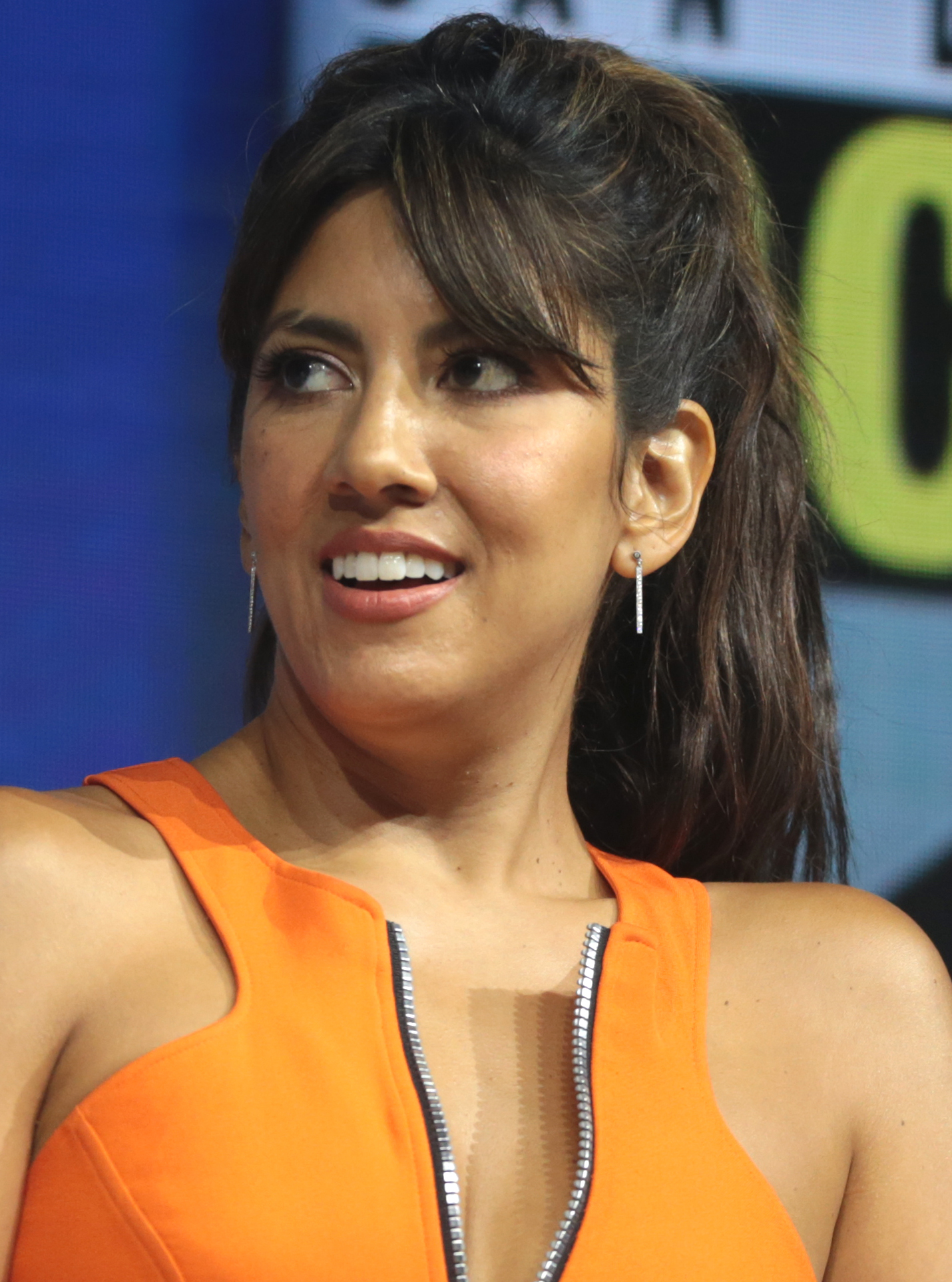
Stephanie Beatriz at the 2018 San Diego Comic-Con panel

Reception of Rosa has been generally positive. Maggie Lange, writing for GQ, praised Rosa for her ability to capture scenes among more outstanding personalities such as Jake Peralta and Gina Linetti. Particular positive attention was given to Beatriz for her portrayal of Rosa's bisexuality – PinkNews called Rosa "our queen" among a list of television's bisexual characters, and praised the show's "thoughtful and considered" representation of bisexuality.

Polygon noted that fans at Brooklyn Nine-Nine's San Diego Comic-Con panel that year repeatedly thanked Stephanie Beatriz for her portrayal. Beatriz said the same to Vulture, recalling a story in which a fan came up to her after she attended the GLAAD Media Awards and said something to the effect of "I'm genderqueer, and I just love your show. I’ve never seen anyone come out on a show I love before."

For her performance as Rosa, Stephanie Beatriz received several accolades. She received two Gracie Awards for "Actress in a Supporting Role – Comedy or Musical", one in 2019 and one in 2020, as well as three nominations for Imagen Awards for "Best Supporting Actress – Television" in 2014, 2016, and 2019, winning the same in 2018.

Beatriz concluded her portrayal of Rosa Diaz with the end of Brooklyn Nine-Nine's eighth and final season. Her performance was said by one reviewer to be her "memorable breakout role"; Beatriz told the reviewer, "I'd be happy if my name is always connected to Rosa Diaz. That’s an honor".
