= Bad beat (disambiguation) =

Bad beat is a poker term for a hand in which a player with what appear to be strong cards nevertheless loses. It may also refer to:

- "Bad Beat" (CSI: NY), a 2005 CSI: NY episode
- "Bad Beat" (The Unit), a 2009 The Unit episode
- "Bad Beat" (Brooklyn Nine-Nine), a 2017 Brooklyn Nine-Nine episode
- Neil Channing, a poker player nicknamed "Bad beat"
