= DFW (Brooklyn Nine-Nine) =

- Brooklyn Nine-Nine episode
- Episode no.: Season 5 Episode 17
- Directed by: Jaffar Mahmood
- Written by: Jeff Topolski
- Cinematography by: Giovani Lampassi
- Editing by: Jeremy Reuben
- Production code: 518
- Original air date: April 15, 2018
- Running time: 21 minutes

Guest appearances
- Nasim Pedrad as Kate Peralta; Michael Cassady as William; Kaylor Leigh as Aubrey; Kirk Fox as Kurt; Katie Michels as Trishelle

Episode chronology
← Previous "NutriBoom"	Next → "Gray Star Mutual"
- Brooklyn Nine-Nine season 5

"DFW" is the 17th episode of the fifth season of the American television police sitcom series Brooklyn Nine-Nine, and the 107th overall episode of the series. The episode was written by Jeff Topolski and directed by Jaffar Mahmood. It aired on Fox in the United States on April 15, 2018, airing back-to-back with the previous episode, "NutriBoom". The episode features guest appearances from Nasim Pedrad, Michael Cassady, and Kirk Fox.

The show revolves around the fictitious 99th precinct of the New York Police Department in Brooklyn and the officers and detectives that work in the precinct. In the episode, Jake's half-sister, Kate, comes to visit him after a rough break-up. After finding her annoying and when she expresses interest in moving to New York, Jake and Amy do everything they can to get her back to Dallas. Terry injures himself after performing yoga with Charles and gets stuck in Hitchcock and Scully's nap room. Gina tries to set Rosa up on a date.

According to Nielsen Media Research, the episode was seen by an estimated 1.48 million household viewers and gained a 0.7/3 ratings share among adults aged 18–49. The episode received generally favorable reviews from critics, who praised its cold open (namely, Jake and five suspects performing a slightly altered version of the song "I Want It That Way" by pop group Backstreet Boys) and Pedrad's performance, but her character and storylines received a more mixed response.

== Plot ==
In the cold open, Jake helps a sister of a murder victim (Devin Sidell) determine who killed her brother by having the police lineup sing "I Want It That Way" by the Backstreet Boys.

Jake (Andy Samberg) invites his half-sister Kate (Nasim Pedrad), one of his dad's many daughters through affairs, to New York to meet with her in anticipation for the wedding. However, when Jake and Amy (Melissa Fumero) meet her, they find her annoying and chaotic.

When Kate considers staying in New York after a rough break-up, Jake and Amy call in her ex-boyfriend Kurt (Kirk Fox) to mend everything so she can return to Dallas. Kurt travels to New York and they reconcile but break up again when Jake sees that he is a bad person for his sister and kicks him out. Kurt then reveals to Kate that he came because Jake and Amy called him and she storms off to the airport. Jake pursues her and apologizes to her, saying that they need to have a better relationship than the one their father gave them.

Meanwhile, Boyle (Joe Lo Truglio) and Holt (Andre Braugher) practice yoga. Terry (Terry Crews) decides to join them but ends up getting his back so injured that he asks Hitchcock (Dirk Blocker) and Scully (Joel McKinnon Miller) for help. He accidentally ends up stuck in Scully's nap room for the whole day until Boyle carries him out. Also, Gina (Chelsea Peretti) sets a date for Rosa (Stephanie Beatriz) in a bar. However, the date, Trishelle, proves to be annoying for Rosa so she spends the night with Aubrey, the bartender, instead. The next day, Gina reveals that Trishelle was a decoy and that Aubrey was the real date.

== Reception ==
=== Viewers ===
In its original American broadcast, "DFW" was seen by an estimated 1.48 million household viewers and gained a 0.7/3 ratings share among adults aged 18–49, according to Nielsen Media Research. This was 18% decrease in viewership from the previous episode, which was watched by 1.79 million viewers with a 0.8/3 in the 18-49 demographics. This means that 0.7 percent of all households with televisions watched the episode, while 3 percent of all households watching television at that time watched it. With these ratings, Brooklyn Nine-Nine was the third highest rated show on FOX for the night, beating The Last Man on Earth, but behind Bob's Burgers and The Simpsons, fifth on its timeslot and ninth for the night, behind Little Big Shots, Bob's Burgers, The Simpsons, 60 Minutes, America's Funniest Home Videos, American Idol, a James Comey interview, and the 53rd Academy of Country Music Awards.

=== Critical reviews ===
"DFW" received generally favorable reviews from critics. LaToya Ferguson of The A.V. Club gave the episode a "B−" grade and wrote, "Kate Peralta is a lot to take in a one-episode dose, and unfortunately—both because of how much she is and because she's played by the always wonderful Nasim Pedrad — 'DFW' has to hit a lot of beats quickly just to hit them. Unlike in 'NutriBoom,' the rest of the episode isn't all that full outside of the A-plot — even with two other subplots and things like Terry Crews' beautiful physical comedy — so there's nothing really to balance just how off the rails the Kate character is. Kate is too much of a mess to enjoyably stick around for multiple episodes in a row, which is of course disappointing because of the Nasim Pedrad of it all."

Alan Sepinwall of Uproxx wrote, "There were some good jokes scattered throughout the rest of the episodes, but Jake meeting his half-sister Kate (played by Samberg's old SNL co-star Nasim Pedrad) as the main plot of 'DFW' was mostly a miss, in part because her behavior never seemed quite terrible (or, other than the bag of glass, creatively terrible) enough, since the episode had to hedge enough so that you'd buy the siblings reconciling by the end."

=== Cold open ===
The cold open, in which Jake helps a sister of a murder victim (Devin Sidell) determine who killed her brother by having the police lineup sing "I Want It That Way" by the Backstreet Boys, was acclaimed and is regarded as one of the most popular scenes from the show. The idea came from a concept originally thought of by producers Luke Del Tredici and Dan Goor and originally involved a song from The Little Mermaid. Usage of "I Want It That Way" reportedly cost between $30,000 and $100,000. In December 2022, the Backstreet Boys filmed their own version of the scene.

As of 2026, the top two most-viewed videos on the show's YouTube channel are of the scene.
