= Bachelor/ette Party =

- Brooklyn Nine-Nine episode
- Episode no.: Season 5 Episode 19
- Directed by: Beth McCarthy-Miller
- Written by: Carly Hallam Tosh
- Cinematography by: Giovani Lampassi
- Editing by: Jason Gill
- Production code: 519
- Original air date: April 29, 2018
- Running time: 21 minutes

Guest appearances
- Reginald VelJohnson as himself; Sarah Baker as Kylie; Blake Anderson as Constantine Kane

Episode chronology
← Previous "Gray Star Mutual"	Next → "Show Me Going"
- Brooklyn Nine-Nine season 5

"Bachelor/ette Party" is the 19th episode of the fifth season of the American television police sitcom series Brooklyn Nine-Nine, and the 109th overall episode of the series. The episode was written by Carly Hallam Tosh and directed by Beth McCarthy-Miller. It aired on Fox in the United States on April 29, 2018. The episode features guest appearances from Reginald VelJohnson, Sarah Baker, and Blake Anderson.

The show revolves around the fictitious 99th precinct of the New York Police Department in Brooklyn and the officers and detectives that work in the precinct. In the episode, Jake Peralta (Andy Samberg) and Amy Santiago (Melissa Fumero) have their respective bachelor/ette parties. However, Jake's party involves an extremely complicated treasure hunt planned by Charles Boyle (Joe Lo Truglio), while Amy's party is interrupted when she finds that Jake hired an ex-boyfriend (Blake Anderson) to play at her wedding and seeks to cancel.

According to Nielsen Media Research, the episode was seen by an estimated 1.97 million household viewers and gained a 0.9/4 ratings share among adults aged 18–49. The episode received very positive reviews from critics, who praised the characters' performance and writing.

== Plot ==
Jake (Andy Samberg) has his bachelor party organized by Boyle (Joe Lo Truglio) with the assistance of Terry (Terry Crews) and Holt (Andre Braugher) while Amy's bachelorette party is organized by her friend Kylie (Sarah Baker) with the assistance of Gina (Chelsea Peretti), Rosa (Stephanie Beatriz), Hitchcock (Dirk Blocker) and Scully (Joel McKinnon Miller).

Boyle's plan involves an overly-elaborate scavenger hunt, which upsets Jake, Terry and Holt. Boyle is then "kidnapped" and gives the gang instructions for the next 6 hours to find clues around the city. Finding in his mail the final destination, the guys decide to eat and drink at a restaurant during the 6 hours. However, at the destination, Boyle realizes the deception and leaves, upset. Jake asks for help from Reginald VelJohnson, an actor from his favourite film Die Hard, who was part of the clues, to locate Boyle and they both apologize for their behavior. Jake then offers an apology to an angry VelJohnson, who immediately rejects this by informing Jake that he has made an "enemy for life" and that he plans to tell Jake's idol, Bruce Willis, that he sucks.

Amy's party turns dull so the gang play Never Have I Ever, which causes Hitchcock and Scully to go to the hospital. During the party, Kylie reveals that Jake hired a band whose lead member, Constantine Kane (Blake Anderson), she once dated (and is still in love with her) to perform at their wedding. The women confront him at a bar, where he refuses to cancel his performance unless he's paid a cancellation fee of $15,000. Amy then takes his contract and burns it, breaking the clause.

== Reception ==
=== Viewers ===
In its original American broadcast, "Bachelor/ette Party" was seen by an estimated 1.97 million household viewers and gained a 0.9/4 ratings share among adults aged 18–49, according to Nielsen Media Research. This was 11% increase in viewership from the previous episode, which was watched by 1.77 million viewers with a 0.8/3 in the 18-49 demographics. This means that 0.9 percent of all households with televisions watched the episode, while 4 percent of all households watching television at that time watched it. With these ratings, Brooklyn Nine-Nine was the third highest rated show on FOX for the night, beating The Last Man on Earth and Bob's Burgers but behind Family Guy and The Simpsons, third on its timeslot and fifth for the night, behind Family Guy, The Simpsons, America's Funniest Home Videos, and American Idol.

=== Critical reviews ===
"Bachelor/ette Party" received very positive reviews from critics. LaToya Ferguson of The A.V. Club gave the episode an "A" grade and wrote, "Of course the plot with drunk, casual Holt (and Reginald VelJohnson!) is going to have the advantage, even when Melissa Fumero pulls off quite the hilariously frantic performance after she steals the contract from Constantine ('Doink!'). 'Bachelor/ette Party' features that beautiful Brooklyn Nine-Nine dynamic I've written about before, where you want more out of the episode—not because it's lacking but because it's so entertaining that you want to spend much more than the 20-something minutes with these characters and stories. Preferably with more drunk Holt."

Alan Sepinwall of Uproxx wrote, "'Bachelor/ette Party' doesn't lack for Nine-Nine staples, from Terry getting hungry when a promised meal was delayed (he's been doing that since season one's Thanksgiving episode), to Jake being obsessed with Die Hard (and thus giddy to meet Reginald VelJohnson, even though the man who would be Sgt. Al Powell wound up hating him), to Boyle taking things too far in his attempt to prove his devotion to Jake. But many of the episode's delights came from seeing characters opt to step out of their comfort zones for this special occasion."
