= 99 (Brooklyn Nine-Nine) =

- Brooklyn Nine-Nine episode
- Episode no.: Season 5 Episode 9
- Directed by: Payman Benz
- Written by: Andy Bobrow
- Cinematography by: Giovani Lampassi
- Editing by: Jason Gill
- Production code: 509
- Original air date: December 5, 2017
- Running time: 21 minutes

Episode chronology
← Previous "Return to Skyfire"	Next → "Game Night"
- Brooklyn Nine-Nine season 5

"99" is the 9th episode of the fifth season of the American television police sitcom series Brooklyn Nine-Nine, and the 99th overall episode of the series. The episode was written by Andy Bobrow and directed by Payman Benz. It aired on Fox in the United States on December 5, 2017. Mike Hagerty reprises his role as McGintley, the former captain of the Nine-Nine.

The show revolves around the fictitious 99th precinct of the New York Police Department in Brooklyn and the officers and detectives that work in the precinct. In the episode, the precinct attends the funeral of the previous captain in Los Angeles, where Holt is told he's on the shortlist for the Commissioner position. The squad then sets to arrive to New York in time so Holt can attend the interview.

According to Nielsen Media Research, the episode was seen by an estimated 1.94 million household viewers and gained a 0.7/3 ratings share among adults aged 18–49. The episode received critical acclaim, praising the performances, writing and callbacks to previous episodes, with some deeming it one of the best episodes in the series.

== Plot ==
Captain McGintley (Mike Hagerty), the previous Captain of the precinct, has died and the squad go to Los Angeles for his funeral. At the funeral, Holt (Andre Braugher) is told he is on the shortlist to replace the retiring New York City Police Commissioner and agrees to return to New York for the interview.

While driving to the airport, Jake (Andy Samberg) makes the car stop so he can visit the Fox Plaza, the location of Nakatomi Plaza in his favorite film Die Hard. However, they get stuck in the plaza for two hours when the door gets locked, missing their flight. With all flights from Los Angeles International Airport cancelled due to storms in the Midwest, they have to rent a derelict RV to drive to New York. While driving through Texas, Holt smells smoke coming from the RV and the group exits shortly before the RV explodes. They then sleep at the cattle stud farm of Boyle's (Joe Lo Truglio) cousins. During this, Rosa (Stephanie Beatriz) reveals to Boyle that she is bisexual and is in a relationship with a woman but refuses to speak more about it.

The next morning, Jake arranges for them to fly back to New York aboard a cargo plane departing from Jacksboro Municipal Airport, but when they try to drive there in a cattle trailer they are pulled over by the police. When the officer claims to be acting on a tip that a similar trailer is being used for drug trafficking, Jake realizes that Holt called 911 on them and confronts him. Holt reveals he sabotaged the RV by pouring cheese puffs into the fuel tank, manipulated them into getting stuck at the plaza, and deliberately slowed the road trip by breaking the speedometer. Holt admits that he was compromised by Seamus Murphy when exonerating Jake and Rosa and fears what his position as Commissioner will bring. The gang promises to help him on the issue and Amy (Melissa Fumero) makes a plan to arrive in time at New York for the interview. After his interview, the squad meet at a bar and Holt announces that he is on the shortlist for the Commissioner position before toasting the 99th precinct.

== Reception ==
=== Viewers ===
In its original American broadcast, "99" was seen by an estimated 1.94 million household viewers and gained a 0.7/3 ratings share among adults aged 18–49, according to Nielsen Media Research. This was 12% increase in viewership from the previous episode, which was watched by 1.73 million viewers with a 0.7/3 in the 18-49 demographics. This means that 0.7 percent of all households with televisions watched the episode, while 3 percent of all households watching television at that time watched it. With these ratings, Brooklyn Nine-Nine was the third highest rated show on FOX for the night, behind The Mick and Lethal Weapon, seventh on its timeslot and fourteenth for the night, behind The Mayor, a rerun of SEAL Team, The Flash, The Mick, Fresh Off the Boat, a rerun of NCIS, Black-ish, Lethal Weapon, Superstore, The Middle, Chicago Med, Will & Grace, and The Voice.

=== Critical reviews ===
"99" received critical acclaim. LaToya Ferguson of The A.V. Club gave the episode an "A" grade and wrote, "Perhaps there's no better way for Brooklyn Nine-Nine to celebrate its 99th episode than to make sure every member of the squad (minus Gina) is stuck with each other for a weekend. With an attempted cross-country road trip to go along with it, '99' truly takes the saying 'go big or go home' to heart. Actually, it ends up being more like 'go big to go home,' and in doing so, it's classic Brooklyn Nine-Nine."

Alan Sepinwall of Uproxx wrote, "Brooklyn Nine-Nine, for obvious reasons, decided to turn this 99th episode into the big celebration. As a result, '99' comes loaded with callbacks, but in a smart way that doesn't turn the episode into a formless, shapeless nostalgia-fest. It's the series reminding fans of the many things they've loved about it in the past, but it tells an actual story that's representative of why the series remains so much fun in the present."
