= Brooklyn Nine-Nine season 5 =

Brooklyn Nine-Nine
- Season 5
- DVD cover
- Starring: Andy Samberg; Stephanie Beatriz; Terry Crews; Melissa Fumero; Joe Lo Truglio; Chelsea Peretti; Andre Braugher; Dirk Blocker; Joel McKinnon Miller
- No. of episodes: 22

Release
- Original network: Fox
- Original release: September 26, 2017 – May 20, 2018

Season chronology
- ← Previous; Season 4 Next → Season 6

The fifth season of the television sitcom Brooklyn Nine-Nine premiered September 26, 2017 on Fox. This was the final season to air on Fox, as the series was canceled on May 10, 2018, before NBC picked it up for a sixth season the following day.

== Summary ==
Jake and Rosa adjust to life in prison before the Nine-Nine are able to bust Melanie Hawkins when Holt is forced to make a deal with local mobster Seamus Murphy. After their release, Jake realizes he's not ready to be back out in the field right away and Rosa breaks up with Adrian. During the fifth annual Halloween heist, Jake proposes to Amy and they get engaged. On a trip to Los Angeles for the funeral of the Nine-Nine's previous captain, Holt learns he's in the running to become the new police commissioner and the crew vows to help him deal with Murphy. Rosa comes out as bisexual. Gina returns to the Nine-Nine after spending months on maternity leave. Though the crew successfully finds a loophole that allows Holt to keep up his deal with Murphy without jeopardizing his moral code, Murphy finds out about their ruse and threatens Kevin's life.

Kevin is forced to remain in a safe house with Jake for two months to avoid detection from Murphy. After the Nine-Nine successfully locates Murphy's hideout, Kevin takes down Murphy and the mobster and his men are successfully apprehended. Charles attempts to run his own food truck business. Amy passes the Sergeant's Exam. After their wedding plans fall apart from a bomb threat, Jake and Amy get married outside of the precinct. The season ends at the after-party of their wedding where the squad is unsure whether Holt won the Commissioner title or not.

== Cast ==
=== Main ===
- Andy Samberg as Detective Jake Peralta
- Stephanie Beatriz as Detective Rosa Diaz
- Terry Crews as Sergeant Terry Jeffords
- Melissa Fumero as Detective Amy Santiago
- Joe Lo Truglio as Detective Charles Boyle
- Chelsea Peretti as Gina Linetti
- Andre Braugher as Captain Raymond Holt

=== Starring ===
- Dirk Blocker as Detective Michael Hitchcock
- Joel McKinnon Miller as Detective Norm Scully

=== Recurring ===
- Gina Gershon as Lt. Melanie Hawkins
- Tim Meadows as Caleb
- Lou Diamond Phillips as Jeff Romero
- Paul Adelstein as Seamus Murphy
- Craig Robinson as Doug Judy
- Jason Mantzoukas as Adrian Pimento
- Marc Evan Jackson as Kevin Cozner
- Kevin Dorff as Hank
- Winston Story as Bill

=== Guest ===
- Dean Winters as Detective Keith "The Vulture" Pembroke
- Bradley Whitford as Captain Roger Peralta
- Katey Sagal as Karen Peralta
- Jimmy Smits as Victor Santiago
- Bertila Damas as Camila Santiago
- Danny Trejo as Oscar Diaz
- Olga Merediz as Julia Diaz
- Fred Melamed as DC Parlov
- Maria Thayer as Jean Munhroe
- Rob Huebel as Landon Lawson
- Reggie Lee as Dr. Ronald Yee
- Mike Mitchell as Kyle Murphy
- Sterling K. Brown as Philip Davidson
- Allison Tolman as Capt. Olivia Crawford
- David Fumero as Vin Stermley
- Drew Tarver as Officer Gary Jennings
- Jay Chandrasekhar as himself
- Nasim Pedrad as Katie Peralta
- Reginald VelJohnson as himself
- Akiva Schaffer as Brett Booth
- Kyle Bornheimer as Sergeant Teddy Wells
- Gina Rodriguez as Alicia

== Episodes ==
Season 5 episode
No. overall	No. in season	Title	Directed by	Written by	Original release date	Prod. code	U.S. viewers (millions)
91	1	"The Big House: Part 1"	Tristram Shapeero	Luke Del Tredici	September 26, 2017	501	2.00
Jake and Rosa have been in prison for a couple of months, with Jake having to deal with his amiable mass-murdering cannibal cellmate, and Rosa doing whatever it takes to establish herself as someone not to be messed with. Jake ends up being put in the general population after smuggling "street soups" to a feared gang led by Romero, and Holt and Terry struggle to fill a very long list of requests for help by Rosa after she realizes they're not going to stop trying to help her. Amy and Boyle badly miss Jake, and Gina is on maternity leave.
92	2	"The Big House: Part 2"	Michael McDonald	Justin Noble	October 3, 2017	502	1.74
Jake undertakes a dangerous undercover mission at the warden's behest, but it looks like he'll end up getting killed by Romero, no matter how it turns out. The squad tries to figure out how to prove Lt. Hawkins was behind the robberies she framed Jake and Rosa for. An operation to hack into her phone is one option, but a more viable and much more dangerous one involves a Hawkins-loathing mob boss named Seamus Murphy, who will give Amy the information to clear Jake and Rosa if she will "do a favor for me" in return. When the operation fails, Holt secretly obtains the information from Murphy, resulting in Jake and Rosa's freedom at the cost of a favor Holt will owe Murphy in the future.
93	3	"Kicks"	Eric Appel	Andrew Guest	October 10, 2017	503	1.68
Jake must pass an official evaluation performed by Holt in order to get back in the field after his incarceration. When Jake starts doubting his choices after the prime suspect claims innocence, he sees it as a weakness, but Holt sees is as a strength. Meanwhile, Rosa gets Amy and Terry's assistance to discover if Pimento is cheating on her. Despite being proven innocent, Rosa decides to break up with him after realizing she would've felt relieved had he been caught.
94	4	"HalloVeen"	Jamie Babbit	Dan Goor	October 17, 2017	504	1.69
On the fifth annual Halloween heist, all members of the squad try to capture the champion cummerbund. Charles, Rosa, and Terry team up to form "The Tramps", as none of them have won the heist yet. Amy figures out Jake's plan and finds the cummerbund; but it is revealed that Jake changed the inscription on the belt from "amazing human/genius" to "Amy Santiago, will you marry me?" Amy accepts Jake's proposal and the two become engaged. While he is happy for them, Captain Holt is slightly upset by the fact that no one technically won the heist, since Jake changed the belt.
95	5	"Bad Beat"	Kat Coiro	Carol Kolb	November 7, 2017	505	1.50
Jake and Terry propose to join an underground gambling ring to catch a criminal. However, in the process, Captain Holt relapses into his old gambling addiction. Charles is planning a new food truck venture and ropes in Amy as an investor, only to later tell her that the truck he bought was the scene of a notorious murder. Rosa accepts Hitchcock's and Scully's challenge when they say she can't sit all day like they do.
96	6	"The Venue"	Cortney Carrillo	Matt Lawton	November 14, 2017	506	1.65
Jake and Amy find a mansion that makes a perfect venue for their wedding, only to have it snatched at the last second by The Vulture, who is also planning to get married on the same day to a woman named Jean Munhroe. After finding out that his fiancé is a kind charity worker and that Vulture will likely cheat on her, they debate over whether they want the venue or to save Jean from her marriage. Charles and Rosa track down and rescue Sergeant Peanut Butter, whom Charles still envies for stealing his thunder when he received his Medal of Valor. Much to Charles' dismay, Peanut Butter is given the credit for the rescue despite Charles saving his life. Captain Holt tries to convince Terry to be less image-conscious after Terry begins to prepare a party for a cop he accidentally offended.
97	7	"Two Turkeys"	Alex Reid	David Phillips	November 21, 2017	507	1.66
Jake and Amy attempt to get their parents to bond over Thanksgiving dinner, but their first holiday together as a family does not go well. However, an unexpected injury causes both sets of parents to reexamine their feelings towards each other, and fulfill Jake’s wish of a big family Thanksgiving. Elsewhere, Holt and husband Kevin’s Thanksgiving pie goes missing, and Holt suspects Rosa, Boyle, or Terry may have taken the pie, as they each tell lies about their Thanksgiving plan. After interrogating them with no luck, Holt enlists the help of Hitchcock and Scully in order to uncover the culprit and find the pie, only to be shocked at his discovery later.
98	8	"Return to Skyfire"	Linda Mendoza	Neil Campbell	November 28, 2017	508	1.73
Skyfire author DC Parlov returns to the precinct after the latest manuscript for his upcoming book was stolen. Jake and Terry who have bonded over their love for Parlov’s book, go to a convention along with Rosa to investigate and find out that Parlov's rival, Landon Lawson, also had his manuscript stolen. As the two authors accuse each other of stealing their work, Terry reveals to Jake that he's been writing a fantasy novel of his own. Jake encourages Terry to have Parlov look at it, only to find out that it's terrible. Back at the precinct, Holt, Amy, and Charles take a forensics course and things go south when their tactic to keep Charles' mouth shut fails.
99	9	"99"	Payman Benz	Andy Bobrow	December 5, 2017	509	1.94
While at a funeral in Los Angeles for their former police chief, Captain Holt finds out he is in the running to be commissioner. After experiencing many difficulties like missing their flight and having their RV explode, Jake and the squad must find a way to get from Los Angeles to New York in time for Holt's interview. Jake finds out that Holt was sabotaging the trip purposefully due to his compromise with Murphy, but the squad vows to find a way to solve Holt's issue and get him to the interview on time. During the trip, Amy tries to act less serious, Terry's upset about missing his first-class flight, and Charles discovers that Rosa is bisexual.
100	10	"Game Night"	Tristram Shapeero	Justin Noble & Carly Hallam Tosh	December 12, 2017	510	1.93
After Rosa reveals she is bisexual to her colleagues, she seeks Jake's help in telling the news to her parents during a dinner with them. Though she initially pretends to be dating Jake during dinner, she comes out and invites Jake to join her family for Game Night, where she finds out how much her parents are willing to accept the change. Meanwhile, the precinct turns to Gina for help when the Cyber Crimes division is using up all their bandwidth, resulting in slow internet. After Gina helps them, she reveals she plans on quitting the Nine-Nine to pursue a career in entrepreneurship. However, after being touched by Amy and Charles' good-byes, she decides to return to the Nine-Nine while continuing to work on her side business.
101	11	"The Favor"	Victor Nelli Jr.	Aeysha Carr	December 12, 2017	511	1.68
Seamus Murphy finally asks Holt for his favor: To request a permit for a block party that will cover up their next crime. Jake and Charles go undercover and befriend Seamus' dimwitted nephew, Kyle, to find out what the Murphys are planning and stop it. Amy and Rosa try to request a permit for the block party, but when they are rejected, they try to find holes in the bureaucratic system Amy's grown to adore. Terry tries to find Gina time and space to use her breast pump for her baby. After the Nine-Nine uncovers Seamus' plan, they manage to foil the planned robbery while ensuring Holt keeps up his end of the bargain. When they arrest Kyle to protect him from his uncle's wrath, Seamus finds out about the ruse and threatens Kevin's life.
102	12	"Safe House"	Nisha Ganatra	Andy Gosche	March 18, 2018	512	1.92
Kevin and Jake are forced to stay in a safe house for two months to avoid getting caught by Seamus Murphy and his men, with heavy restrictions placed by Holt. Jake begins to worry when Holt's over-protectiveness starts to strain his and Kevin's marriage. The Nine-Nine try to track down Murphy. Rosa goes to a hair salon and is forced to make small talk and change her hair to get info out of Murphy's girlfriend. Amy, Terry, and Scully search through a room full of shredded documents to pin down Murphy's location.
103	13	"The Negotiation"	Linda Mendoza	Phil Augusta Jackson	March 25, 2018	513	1.83
Jake is requested to act as a negotiator for a hostage situation at a jewelry store, only to find out that it's a set-up from Doug Judy, who asks for his help to take down a dangerous criminal in order to rescue Judy's mother. Amy and Gina try to help Charles out with his new food truck, as the stress of his new business and perfectionist attitude seems to be getting to him. When a member of the Police Commissioner selection committee decides to interview Hitchcock about Holt's qualities, Holt and Terry train him to be less disgusting and more professional.
104	14	"The Box"	Claire Scanlon	Luke Del Tredici	April 1, 2018	516	1.78
Jake and Holt spend the night interrogating dentist Phillip Davidson to determine if he murdered his partner. The task proves difficult, as Davidson appears to have a defense for all of their accusations and strategies, leaving Jake to take drastic measures.
105	15	"The Puzzle Master"	Akiva Schaffer	Lang Fisher	April 8, 2018	514	1.74
After Amy passes the Sergeant's Exam, Jake tries to make their last case together memorable by choosing an investigation of a series of arsons connected to Amy's favorite crossword puzzle author, Vin Stermly. When Vin joins them on the case and impresses Amy with his intellect and looks, Jake becomes jealous. Holt and Gina meet the competition for Police Commissioner and are intimidated by a young woman in the running. Terry, Rosa, Hitchcock, and Scully debate over who should get the new Detective car.
106	16	"NutriBoom"	Trent O'Donnell	David Phillips	April 15, 2018	515	1.79
When the pyramid scheme NutriBoom refuses to let Jake go off easy after he wants to cancel his contract that he signed in "HalloVeen", he and Charles try to bring down the organization from the inside by investigating the company's shady past. Meanwhile, Amy's first day as Sergeant becomes stressful when she has to deal with a upbeat overachiever who behaves similar to her.
107	17	"DFW"	Jaffar Mahmood	Jeff Topolski	April 15, 2018	518	1.48
Jake's chaotic half-sister, Kate, comes to visit him and Amy for a couple days after a rough break-up. When she considers moving to New York to live with them, the two try to figure out a way to get her to return to Dallas. Terry injures himself after performing yoga with Charles and gets stuck in Hitchcock and Scully’s nap room. Gina tries to set Rosa up on a date.
108	18	"Gray Star Mutual"	Giovani Lampassi	Jessica Polonsky	April 22, 2018	517	1.77
Pimento returns as an insurance claims investigator to help Jake and Charles find out who burned down Charles' food truck. However, when he discovers how many events he's missed at the Nine-Nine after not being updated by the precinct for several months, he turns against them. Amy thinks that shopping for her wedding dress would make her look weak to her subordinates, so Rosa helps her choose the right dress while instilling a sense of confidence within her. Terry and Gina try to have Holt set up a Twitter account to increase his social media presence.
109	19	"Bachelor/ette Party"	Beth McCarthy-Miller	Carly Hallam Tosh	April 29, 2018	519	1.97
Charles plans out an overly-elaborate scavenger hunt for Jake's Bachelor Party. Not wanting to spend hours attempting it, Jake, Holt, and Terry go to a restaurant instead and try skipping to the end of the hunt only to suffer the consequences. At Amy's Bachelorette party, Amy finds out that Jake hired a band whose lead member she once dated (and is still in love with her) to perform at their wedding. She and the bridesmaids try to cancel the band's appearance.
110	20	"Show Me Going"	Maggie Carey	Phil Augusta Jackson	May 6, 2018	520	1.67
When news of an active shooter in Brooklyn Heights reaches the precinct, they learn Rosa is near the scene and is heading to help. When they hear this, the squad, unable to go themselves, desperately fears for her safety. Feeling helpless, Jake frantically brainstorms ways to offer his assistance, only to be shut down by Holt. Meanwhile, Terry faces an existential crisis, and Gina and Amy try to make themselves useful by fixing Rosa's broken toilet.
111	21	"White Whale"	Matthew Nodella	Matt Lawton & Carol Kolb	May 13, 2018	521	1.75
Rosa and Amy team up to take down their "white whale" suspect - a ruthless killer who has managed to elude them for seven years - while Terry helps Jake tackle his wedding planning chores, such as picking out the proper napkin color. Elsewhere, Captain Holt and his rival, Olivia Crawford, try to convince each other to step down in the campaign for Commissioner.
112	22	"Jake & Amy"	Dan Goor	Dan Goor & Luke Del Tredici	May 20, 2018	522	1.79
Jake and Amy's wedding plans start falling apart as someone has threatened the wedding with a bomb. Jake, Amy, and Charles discover that the culprit was a criminal Amy arrested in the past who planted a bomb in the vents after seeing the wedding advertised in the newspaper by Charles. Charles redeems himself by setting up the wedding outside of the precinct, where Jake and Amy are happily married. While fixing Amy's veil, Terry and Rosa meet a cab driver named Alicia, whom Terry tries to hook Rosa up with. Holt receives an email informing him if he has successfully been appointed Commissioner, and holds off reading it out of fear. At the wedding after-party, Holt finally reads it, but his neutral facial expression leaves the squad unsure as to the outcome.

== Reception ==
=== Ratings ===
Viewership and ratings per episode of Brooklyn Nine-Nine season 5
No.	Title	Air date	Rating/share (18–49)	Viewers (millions)	DVR (18–49)	DVR viewers (millions)	Total (18–49)	Total viewers (millions)
1	"The Big House Pt. 1"	September 26, 2017	0.7/3	2.00	0.7	1.24	1.4	3.24
2	"The Big House Pt. 2"	October 3, 2017	0.6/2	1.74	0.7	1.24	1.3	2.98
3	"Kicks"	October 10, 2017	0.7/3	1.68	0.6	1.19	1.3	2.87
4	"HalloVeen"	October 17, 2017	0.6/2	1.69	0.7	1.21	1.3	2.90
5	"Bad Beat"	November 7, 2017	0.6/2	1.50	0.7	1.29	1.3	2.78
6	"The Venue"	November 14, 2017	0.6/2	1.65	0.6	1.14	1.2	2.78
7	"Two Turkeys"	November 21, 2017	0.6/2	1.66	0.7	1.34	1.3	3.00
8	"Return to Skyfire"	November 28, 2017	0.7/3	1.73	0.6	1.16	1.3	2.89
9	"99"	December 5, 2017	0.7/3	1.94	0.6	1.15	1.3	3.09
10	"Game Night"	December 12, 2017	0.7/3	1.93	TBD	TBD	TBD	TBD
11	"The Favor"	December 12, 2017	0.7/2	1.68	TBD	TBD	TBD	TBD
12	"Safe House"	March 18, 2018	0.9/4	1.92	0.6	TBD	1.5	TBD
13	"The Negotiation"	March 25, 2018	0.9/4	1.83	TBD	0.94	TBD	2.78
14	"The Box"	April 1, 2018	0.8/3	1.78	TBD	1.04	TBD	2.82
15	"The Puzzle Master"	April 8, 2018	0.8/3	1.74	TBD	TBD	TBD	TBD
16	"NutriBoom"	April 15, 2018	0.8/3	1.79	TBD	TBD	TBD	TBD
17	"DFW"	April 15, 2018	0.7/3	1.48	TBD	TBD	TBD	TBD
18	"Gray Star Mutual"	April 22, 2018	0.8/3	1.77	TBD	TBD	TBD	TBD
19	"Bachelor/ette Party"	April 29, 2018	0.9/4	1.97	TBD	TBD	TBD	TBD
20	"Show Me Going"	May 6, 2018	0.7/3	1.67	TBD	TBD	TBD	TBD
21	"White Whale"	May 13, 2018	0.8/4	1.75	TBD	TBD	TBD	TBD
22	"Jake & Amy"	May 20, 2018	0.8/4	1.79	TBD	TBD	TBD	TBD

=== Critical response ===
The fifth season received critical acclaim from audiences and critics, who praised the chemistry, humor, prison arc, performances, and writing, with many calling it a heartwarming ending to the Fox era of the show and some calling it one of the best seasons of the show. The review aggregator website Rotten Tomatoes reports a 100% approval rating, with an average score of 8.5/10, based on 14 reviews. The website's consensus reads, "Brooklyn Nine-Nine's final year with Fox pops with such joyous affection that it could have been a satisfying closer for the series, but the ensemble's unflappable chemistry continues to gel so well that viewers will be glad that these cops will live to fight crime again."
