= The Mayor (TV series) =

Television series

- Genre: Comedy
- Created by: Jeremy Bronson
- Starring: Brandon Micheal Hall; Lea Michele; Bernard David Jones; Marcel Spears; Yvette Nicole Brown
- Composers: Jonathan Snipes; Daveed Diggs; William Huston
- Country of origin: United States
- Original language: English
- No. of seasons: 1
- No. of episodes: 13

Production
- Executive producers: Jeremy Bronson; Daveed Diggs; Dylan Clark; James Griffiths; Scott Stuber; Jamie Tarses
- Producers: Kris Eber; Scott Printz
- Camera setup: Single-camera
- Running time: 22 minutes
- Production companies: Jeremy Bronson Productions; Fee-Fi-Fo Films; FanFare Productions; ABC Studios

Original release
- Network: ABC
- Release: October 3 – December 12, 2017

The Mayor is an American television sitcom created by Jeremy Bronson. The series was produced by ABC Studios, with Bronson serving as showrunner. It aired on ABC from October 3 to December 12, 2017. The series stars Brandon Micheal Hall as Courtney Rose, an aspiring rapper who unwittingly becomes the mayor of his hometown after running to gain publicity for his music. Lea Michele and Yvette Nicole Brown also star, with newcomers Bernard David Jones and Marcel Spears. The pilot was ordered to series by ABC on May 11, 2017.

Despite receiving positive reviews from critics, ABC cancelled the series after just one season on January 4, 2018, citing dwindling DVR viewership and "political fatigue" among audiences. The remaining episodes were made available on a weekly basis on Hulu and then on ABC.com starting January 25, 2018.

== Premise ==
Courtney Rose, a struggling hip-hop artist, runs for mayor of his California hometown, Fort Grey, in order to promote his music career. The real troubles begin when, unexpectedly, he wins the election.

== Cast and characters ==
=== Main ===
- Brandon Micheal Hall as Courtney Rose: An aspiring rapper and the new mayor of Fort Grey, California.
- Lea Michele as Valentina "Val" Barella: Courtney's former classmate and current chief of staff. During the mayoral race, Val campaigned for Courtney's opponent, Ed Gunt.
- Bernard David Jones as Jermaine Leforge: Courtney's best friend and Fort Grey's communications director.
- Marcel Spears as T.K. Clifton: Courtney's best friend and Fort Grey's director of constituent services.
- Yvette Nicole Brown as Dina Rose: Courtney's mother, a postal worker who reads people's mail.

=== Recurring ===
- Wendy Raquel Robinson as Krystal
- Jillian Armenante as Kitty Cavanaugh: One of Courtney's employees, hired by Val.
- David Spade as Ed Gunt: A councilman and Courtney's rival in the election.

=== Guest ===
- Daveed Diggs as Mac Etcetera: A hip-hop artist and Courtney's idol.
- Larry Joe Campbell as Dick: One of Courtney's employees, hired by Val.
- Larry Wilmore as Vern Corker: A fiscal analyst who works for the City Council.
- Anabel Munoz as Gabby Montoya
- Arsenio Hall as Reverend Ocho Okoye
- Kristen Johnston as Police Chief Fox

== Episodes ==
No.	Title	Directed by	Written by	Original release date	Prod. code	US viewers (millions)
1	"Pilot"	James Griffiths	Jeremy Bronson	October 3, 2017	101	4.08
Fledgling rapper Courtney Rose debates against Councilman Ed Gunt, who claims to want to renovate the City Commons by 2020, as the area has been treated as a dump for a long time. A week later, Courtney is revealed to have won the mayoral election with 52% of the votes. Now the mayor, Courtney, with help from his friends and the community, renovates the City Commons via a block party. While at the party, Courtney has a choice to make: either fulfill his role as mayor and stay at the party or go to a club to perform alongside his favorite rapper.
2	"The Filibuster"	James Griffiths	Vijal Patel	October 10, 2017	103	3.44
Courtney visits Fort Grey Elementary School, his alma mater, and promises new instruments for its music program, but the City Council rejects the proposal. Val works with fiscal analyst Vern Corker to find money for the school while Courtney buys time with a filibuster. Meanwhile, Dina helps T.K. comes to grips with his new role as director of constituent services.
3	"Buyer's Remorse"	John Fortenberry	Jeremy Bronson	October 17, 2017	102	2.96
4	"City Hall-oween"	James Griffiths	Regina Hicks	October 24, 2017	104	2.95
5	"The Strike"	Tina Mabry	Matt Fusfeld & Alex Cuthbertson	October 31, 2017	105	2.38
6	"Will You Accept this Rose?"	James Griffiths	Emily Halpern & Sarah Haskins	November 7, 2017	106	2.62
7	"Here Comes the Governor"	Tristram Shapeero	Monica Padrick	November 14, 2017	107	2.45
8	"Monuments Man"	James Griffiths	Vijal Patel	December 5, 2017	110	2.74
9	"Grey Christmas"	Kevin Bray	Emily Halpern & Sarah Haskins	December 12, 2017	109	2.81
10	"Mama Rose Best"	Anya Adams	Jared Miller	January 9, 2018 (Hulu)	108	N/A
11	"Lockdown"	Jay Chandrasekhar	Sabrina Jalees	January 16, 2018 (Hulu)	111	N/A
12	"The Pitch"	Tristram Shapeero	Amanda Idoko	January 23, 2018 (Hulu)	112	N/A
13	"Death of a Councilman"	Bill Purple	Mnelik Belilgne	January 25, 2018 (Hulu)	113	N/A

== Production ==
=== Development ===
The Mayor was pitched to the ABC network in the summer of 2016, and it has drawn some comparisons to the outcome of the 2016 U.S. presidential election as well as Donald Trump's presidential campaign and victory. The series' creator, Jeremy Bronson, has stated the show is not meant to be a parody or satire, but he has admitted that the pilot episode drew some inspiration from President Trump.

=== Casting ===
On January 26, 2017, Brandon Micheal Hall was cast as Courtney Rose. Lea Michele was cast as Valentina Barella on February 23, 2017. On March 16, 2017, Yvette Nicole Brown was cast as Dina Rose. Marcel Spears was cast as T.K. Clifton on May 16, 2017. On July 27, 2017, Bernard David Jones was cast as Jermaine Leforge.

=== Music ===
In addition to serving as an executive producer, Daveed Diggs wrote original music for the series.

== Reception ==
=== Ratings ===
Viewership and ratings per episode of The Mayor
No.	Title	Air date	Rating/share (18–49)	Viewers (millions)	DVR (18–49)	DVR viewers (millions)	Total (18–49)	Total viewers (millions)
1	"Pilot"	October 3, 2017	1.2/5	4.08	0.4	1.23	1.6	5.32
2	"The Filibuster"	October 10, 2017	1.0/4	3.44	TBD	TBD	TBD	TBD
3	"Buyer's Remorse"	October 17, 2017	0.8/3	2.96	TBD	TBD	TBD	TBD
4	"City Hall-oween"	October 24, 2017	0.8/3	2.95	TBD	TBD	TBD	TBD
5	"The Strike"	October 31, 2017	0.7/3	2.38	TBD	TBD	TBD	TBD
6	"Will You Accept This Rose?"	November 7, 2017	0.7/3	2.62	TBD	TBD	TBD	TBD
7	"Here Comes the Governor"	November 14, 2017	0.7/3	2.45	TBD	TBD	TBD	TBD
8	"Monuments Man"	December 5, 2017	0.7/3	2.74	TBD	TBD	TBD	TBD
9	"Grey Christmas"	December 12, 2017	0.8/3	2.81	TBD	TBD	TBD	TBD

=== Critical response ===
The review aggregator website Rotten Tomatoes reported an approval rating of 81% based on 31 reviews, with an average rating of 7.66/10. The website's critical consensus reads, "The Mayor gets off to a promising start in its first season, elevated by a charmingly hopeful tone and political humor that reaches amiably across the aisle." Metacritic, which uses a weighted average, assigned a score of 72 out of 100 based on 19 critics, indicating "generally favorable reviews".
