= Brooklyn Nine-Nine =

American television sitcom (2013–2021)

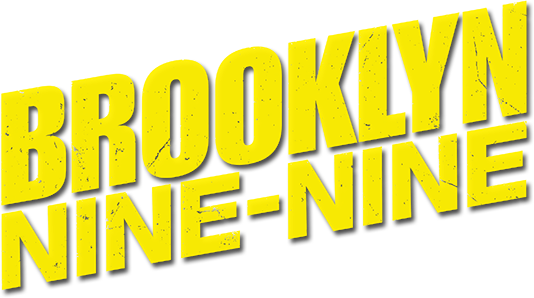
- Genre: Workplace comedy; Sitcom; Police procedural
- Created by: Dan Goor; Michael Schur
- Showrunner: Dan Goor
- Starring: Andy Samberg; Stephanie Beatriz; Terry Crews; Melissa Fumero; Joe Lo Truglio; Chelsea Peretti; Andre Braugher; Dirk Blocker; Joel McKinnon Miller
- Theme music composer: Dan Marocco featuring: Jacques Slade; Lamar Van Sciver; Frank Greenfield
- Composer: Dan Marocco
- Country of origin: United States
- Original language: English
- No. of seasons: 8
- No. of episodes: 153 (list of episodes)

Production
- Executive producers: Dan Goor; Michael Schur; David Miner; Phil Lord (pilot); Christopher Miller (pilot); Luke Del Tredici; David Phillips
- Producer: Matthew Nodella
- Cinematography: Giovani Lampassi; Rick Page
- Camera setup: Single-camera
- Running time: 21–23 minutes
- Production companies: Fremulon; Dr. Goor Productions; 3 Arts Entertainment; Universal Television

Original release
- Network: Fox
- Release: September 17, 2013 – May 20, 2018
- Network: NBC
- Release: January 10, 2019 – September 16, 2021

Brooklyn Nine-Nine is an American police procedural sitcom that aired on Fox from September 17, 2013, to May 20, 2018, and later on NBC, from January 10, 2019, to September 16, 2021, for eight seasons and 153 episodes. Created by Dan Goor and Michael Schur and produced by Fremulon, Dr. Goor Productions, 3 Arts Entertainment and Universal Television, it revolved around seven New York City Police Department (NYPD) detectives who are adjusting to life under their new commanding officer, the serious and stern Captain Raymond Holt (Andre Braugher). Andy Samberg led the ensemble cast, which featured Stephanie Beatriz, Terry Crews, Melissa Fumero, Joe Lo Truglio, Chelsea Peretti, Dirk Blocker, and Joel McKinnon Miller.

Fox originally ordered 13 episodes of the single-camera comedy for its first season, eventually expanding it to 22 episodes. Brooklyn Nine-Nine premiered on September 17, 2013. On May 10, 2018, Fox cancelled it after five seasons; the next day, NBC picked it up for a sixth season, which premiered on January 10, 2019. The seventh season premiered in February 2020. The 10-episode eighth and final season premiered on August 12, 2021.

The series has been acclaimed by critics. The first season won the Golden Globe Award for Best Television Series – Musical or Comedy, and on the same night, Samberg won the Golden Globe Award for Best Actor – Television Series Musical or Comedy. Braugher was nominated four times for the Primetime Emmy Award for Outstanding Supporting Actor in a Comedy Series and twice won the Critics' Choice Television Award for Best Supporting Actor in a Comedy Series. For its portrayal of LGBTQ+ characters, it won the 2018 GLAAD Media Award for Outstanding Comedy Series.

== Premise ==
Set in the fictional 99th Precinct of the New York City Police Department in Brooklyn, Brooklyn Nine-Nine follows a team of detectives headed by the serious and intellectual Captain Raymond Holt, who is assigned as their new commanding officer in the pilot episode. The station's exterior is based on Brooklyn's 78th Precinct.

== Cast and characters ==
- Andy Samberg as Jake Peralta: Jake is a skilled detective, but often acts immaturely. He dates and later marries Amy in season 5, and they have a son in season 7. He often talks about his hard upbringing caused by his father leaving him as a child. In the final episode he leaves his job to look after his son, Mac, giving him the upbringing his father denied him.
- Stephanie Beatriz as Rosa Diaz: Rosa is an intimidating detective; most of the 99th precinct is afraid of her. She takes pride in being very private and her colleagues know almost nothing about her, including what she likes or where she lives. At the police academy, she was classmates with Jake and the two became close friends. In season 2, she dates Holt's nephew Marcus (portrayed by Nick Cannon). During the very end of season 2, all of season 3 and the beginning to season 4, she dates fellow detective Adrian Pimento (portrayed by Jason Mantzoukas). She comes out as bisexual later in season 5 and dates Jocelyn Pryce (portrayed by Cameron Esposito) in season 6. In the final season she has left her job, in the wake of Black Lives Matter, becoming a private detective and helping those targeted by crooked cops.
- Terry Crews as Terry Jeffords: Terry is a family man with a wife, Sharon, twin daughters, Cagney and Lacey, and a third daughter, named Ava, born on Thanksgiving in season 3. He works out frequently and is very strong, though he used to be extremely overweight. For the first five seasons, he is a sergeant. In season 6, he passes an exam to become a lieutenant. In the series finale, he becomes the captain of the Nine-Nine.
- Melissa Fumero as Amy Santiago: Amy is a neurotic, competitive, nerdy detective who desperately seeks Captain Holt's approval. She becomes a sergeant in season 5. Although very different people, she and Jake begin to date in season 3, get married in season 5, and have a son named Mac, after the fictional John McClane, at the end of season 7. In the final episode she becomes a chief and heads a new police reform program with Holt.
- Joe Lo Truglio as Charles Boyle: Charles is Jake's best friend, and the two often work together on cases. He has an encyclopedic knowledge and love of food, especially of more exotic varieties. Early in season 1, he has an intense crush on Rosa and tries to ask her out on numerous occasions but fails. After a brief engagement to food author Vivian Ludley, he later begins a relationship with an artist named Genevieve and the two adopt a son named Nikolaj from Latvia at the start of season 4.
- Chelsea Peretti as Gina Linetti (main seasons 1–6; special guest season 8): (Note: Peretti left the main cast in "Four Movements", the fourth episode of season 6. She returned as a special guest star in season 6's "Return of the King" and in season 8's "The Last Day".) Gina is Captain Holt's assistant and Jake's childhood friend. She is largely uninterested in the people around her, instead focusing almost entirely on her phone and social media. She has a short-lived sexual relationship with Charles, which she is incredibly ashamed of, though she later goes public with the relationship, without consulting Charles. In season 5, she has a child named Enigma/"Iggy" with Charles's cousin Milton Boyle. Gina departs temporarily at the start of season 5 for maternity leave to care for Iggy (this was written to coincide with Peretti's real-life pregnancy), and for good in season 6 to build an online brand, but she returns in the series finale.
- Andre Braugher as Raymond Holt: Captain Holt is the captain of the 99th precinct and takes pride in being the NYPD's first gay black police captain. He is known for his stoic and deadpan demeanor and he frequently criticizes Jake's immature behavior, though he eventually develops a strong, familial relationship with all his detectives, who in turn hold him in high esteem. Both Amy and Jake view him as a father figure. He is married to Kevin Cozner (portrayed by Marc Evan Jackson), a professor of classics at Columbia University, and has a Pembroke Welsh Corgi named Cheddar. He is rivals with Deputy Chief (Commissioner) Madeline Wuntch. In the final episode he is promoted to Deputy Commissioner to run a police reform program with Amy in the wake of Black Lives Matter and the behavior of the police over lockdown.
- Dirk Blocker as Michael Hitchcock and Joel McKinnon Miller as Norm Scully (recurring season 1, starring seasons 2–5, main season 6–8): Hitchcock and Scully are two aging, accident-prone, lazy, and incompetent detectives whose careers peaked in the 1980s. They are best friends and state that their ideas are each other's. Hitchcock is vulgar and crass, especially towards women, has numerous ex-wives, and lives in a van; Scully is much more kind-hearted and can sing opera well, despite suffering from numerous medical maladies.

== Production ==
=== Development ===
Writers and producers Michael Schur and Dan Goor, who had known each other since they were students at Harvard University, and had collaborated on the sitcom Parks and Recreation, conceived the idea to set a comedy in a police station, a setting they felt had been insufficiently used in television comedies since Barney Miller. They pitched the idea to production company Universal Television, where Schur had a development deal. Although Universal signed on to produce the series, its parent company's network, NBC, passed on airing it, so the duo sold it to Fox.

Fox placed a 14-episode order for the single-camera ensemble comedy in May 2013. The series was picked up for a full season of 22 episodes in October 2013, and was later chosen to air with the show New Girl in a "special one-hour comedy event" as the Super Bowl XLVIII lead-out programs. It was filmed at the CBS Studio Center in Studio City, Los Angeles.

The exterior view of the fictional 99th Precinct building was the actual 78th Precinct building in Brooklyn. If the 99th Precinct were real, it would be considered a Brooklyn police precinct (where numbers can theoretically range from 60 to 99), but no precinct has yet been assigned the number "99".

=== Cancellation and renewals ===
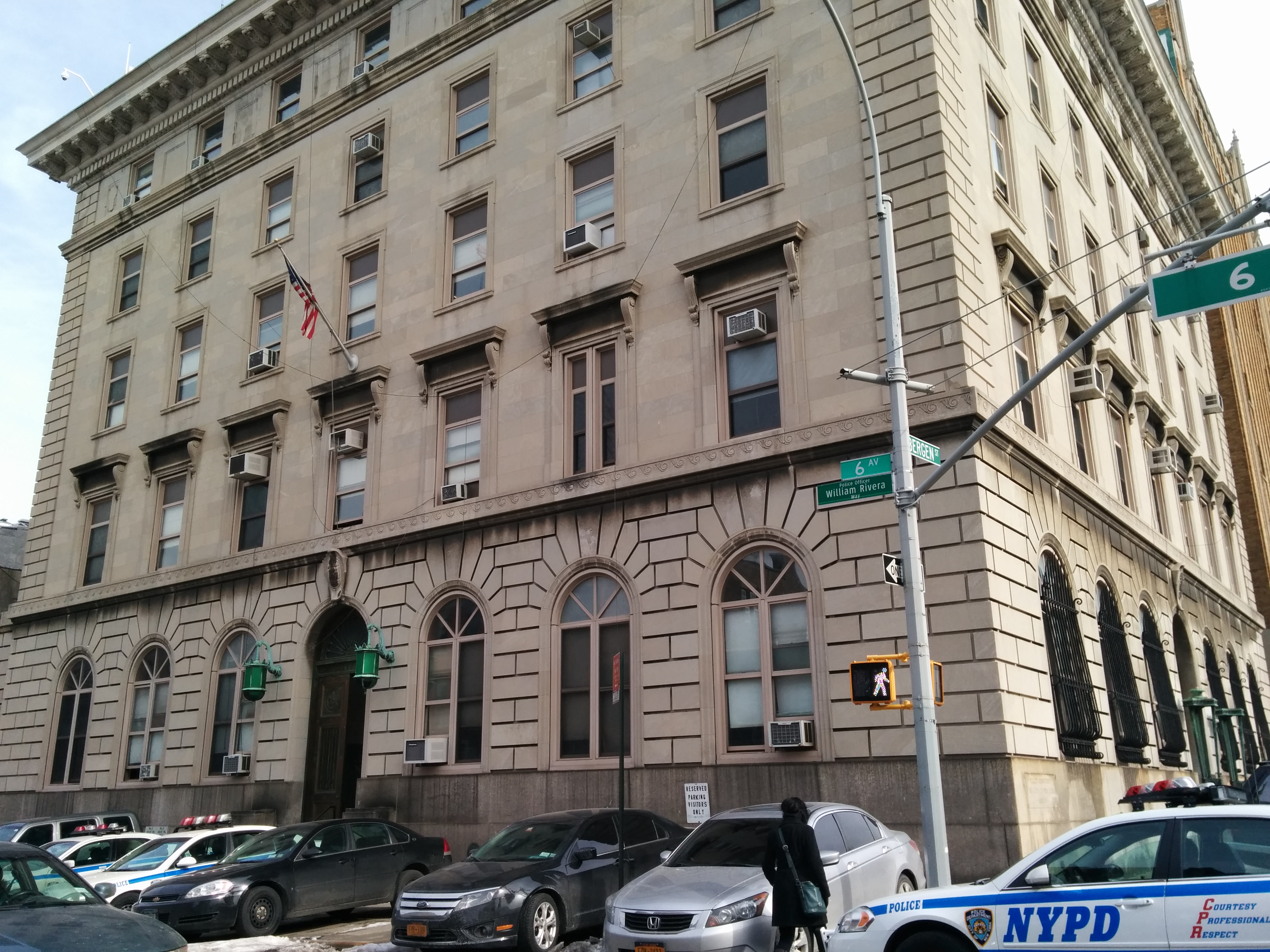
Police cars parked on the sidewalk at the NYPD 78th Precinct building in Brooklyn: An exterior image is used as an establishing shot throughout the show.

Fox canceled the series after five seasons in May 2018. Negotiations to revive the series for a sixth season began shortly afterwards with TBS and NBC, as well as streaming services Hulu and Netflix. After fans launched a social-media campaign calling for a renewal, and only thirty hours following the show's cancellation by Fox, Goor announced that NBC had picked up the series for a sixth season comprising 13 episodes. In a statement, NBC Entertainment chairman Robert Greenblatt expressed regret for originally passing on the series to Fox and was "thrilled" at its addition to the network. NBC subsequently announced that the series would premiere midseason in the 2018–19 television season. In September, the network ordered an additional five episodes for season six, bringing the order to 18. The sixth season premiered on NBC on January 10, 2019. Peretti, who portrays civilian administrator Gina Linetti, departed as a series regular during the season, but returned for a guest appearance.

In February 2019, NBC renewed the series for a seventh season, followed by an eighth season renewal in November prior to the airing of the seventh. The seventh season premiered on February 6, 2020, and concluded on April 23.

In February 2021, NBC announced that the eighth season of 10 episodes would be the last, and further announced that the eighth-season premiere would be delayed until August 12, 2021. Two episodes aired back-to-back each week for five weeks and the series concluded on September 16, 2021.

=== Writing ===
In June 2020, Crews said that the planned direction of the eighth season was being altered in response to the murder of George Floyd, with Goor cancelling four "ready to go" episodes as a result. Samberg also stated that the series would be "striking a balance" between addressing police brutality and maintaining its comedic style. It also incorporated the COVID-19 pandemic during the season. Although initially announced as part of NBC's fall schedule, the eighth-season premiere was pushed back to 2021 due to the pandemic.

Goor called ending the series "a difficult decision, but ultimately, we felt it was the best way to honor the characters, the story, and our viewers".

== Episodes ==
Series overview
Season	Episodes	Originally released			Rank	Total viewers (in millions inc. DVR)
Season	Episodes	First released	Last released	Network	Rank	Total viewers (in millions inc. DVR)
1	22	September 17, 2013	March 25, 2014	Fox	98	4.80
2	23	September 28, 2014	May 17, 2015	Fox	113	4.87
3	23	September 27, 2015	April 19, 2016	Fox	118	3.98
4	22	September 20, 2016	May 23, 2017	Fox	137	2.87
5	22	September 26, 2017	May 20, 2018	Fox	161	2.71
6	18	January 10, 2019	May 16, 2019	NBC	138	3.11
7	13	February 6, 2020	April 23, 2020	NBC	105	2.69
8	10	August 12, 2021	September 16, 2021	NBC	—N/a	—N/a

== Reception ==
=== Critical response ===
Critical response of Brooklyn Nine-Nine
Season	Rotten Tomatoes	Metacritic
1	89% (57 reviews)	70 (34 reviews)
2	100% (18 reviews)	—N/a
3	93% (14 reviews)	—N/a
4	100% (13 reviews)	—N/a
5	100% (14 reviews)	—N/a
6	100% (27 reviews)	81 (9 reviews)
7	89% (9 reviews)	—N/a
8	89% (28 reviews)	75 (6 reviews)

Rotten Tomatoes gave season one a score of 89% based on 57 reviews. The consensus is: "Led by the surprisingly effective pairing of Andy Samberg and Andre Braugher, Brooklyn Nine-Nine is a charming, intelligently written take on the cop show format." For Season 2, it received a score of 100% based on 17 reviews. That season's consensus is: "Brooklyn Nine-Nine's winning cast, appealing characters and wacky gags make it good comfort food." Metacritic gives the first season of the show a weighted average rating of 70/100 based on 33 reviews, indicating "generally favorable reviews".

Alyssa Rosenberg of The Washington Post deemed Brooklyn Nine-Nine "one of the funniest, most important shows on TV" and highlighted its "ability to find unpredictable routes into a wide range of issues in contemporary policing." Writing for Vanity Fair, Grace Robertson regarded the series as "a well-made exemplar of [...] the workplace sitcom" that confers "straightforward pleasures". Slate's Aisha Harris called the series "a well-crafted fantasy, with hardly any discernible connection to current cultural attitudes about law enforcement" but complimented its "talented" ensemble cast. It was ranked No. 24 in Rolling Stone's 50 Best TV Shows of the 2010s list, in which its curator, Alan Sepinwall, praised "the comedic yin and yang" of Samberg and Braugher's characters.

Brooklyn Nine-Nine has received praise for its forthright portrayal of LGBTQ people and the serious issues that affect them while retaining its sense of humor. Portraying Captain Raymond Holt, a lead character, as an openly gay, no-nonsense black man in a same-sex interracial marriage is unprecedented in cinema and television. The storyline about detective Rosa Diaz coming out as bisexual in episodes "99" and "Game Night", the 99th & 100th episodes of the series, has been cited as an important moment in the representation of sexual orientation. The show has also been the subject of academic analysis.

=== Ratings ===
Viewership and ratings per season of Brooklyn Nine-Nine
Season	Timeslot (ET)	Network	Episodes	First aired		Last aired		TV season	Viewership rank	Avg. viewers (millions)
Season	Timeslot (ET)	Network	Episodes	Date	Viewers (millions)	Date	Viewers (millions)	TV season	Viewership rank	Avg. viewers (millions)
1	Tuesday 8:30 pm (1–14); Sunday 11:00 pm (15); Tuesday 9:30 pm (16–22)	Fox	22	September 17, 2013	6.17	March 25, 2014	2.59	2013–14	98	4.80
2	Sunday 8:30 pm	Fox	23	September 28, 2014	5.46	May 17, 2015	2.35	2014–15	113	4.87
3	Sunday 8:30 pm (1–10); Tuesday 9:00 pm (11–23)	Fox	23	September 27, 2015	3.14	April 19, 2016	2.02	2015–16	118	3.99
4	Tuesday 8:00 pm (1–10, 13–22); Sunday 8:30 pm (11 & 12)	Fox	22	September 20, 2016	2.39	May 23, 2017	1.50	2016–17	137	2.87
5	Tuesday 9:30 pm (1–11); Sunday 8:30 pm (12–22)	Fox	22	September 26, 2017	2.00	May 20, 2018	1.79	2017–18	161	2.71
6	Thursday 9:00 pm	NBC	18	January 10, 2019	3.54	May 16, 2019	1.55	2018–19	138	3.11
7	Thursday 8:30 pm	NBC	13	February 6, 2020	2.66	April 23, 2020	2.24	2019–20	105	2.69
8	Thursday 8:00 pm (1, 3, 5, 7, 9); Thursday 8:30 pm (2, 4, 6, 8, 10)	NBC	10	August 12, 2021	1.84	September 16, 2021	1.88	2020–21	N/A	N/A

== Broadcast ==
Brooklyn Nine-Nine is broadcast in Canada on Citytv. After the second episode of the second season, it was replaced on Sunday nights by Rogers Hometown Hockey for the duration of the 2014–15 NHL regular season; after the NHL season concluded City resumed airing Brooklyn Nine-Nine, and has continued to broadcast the show simultaneously with the American broadcast since the third season (Hometown Hockey was moved to Sportsnet in 2015). The series also aired on TBS and sister channel TruTV from 2018 to 2021. Brooklyn Nine-Nine aired on Comedy Central from 2022 until 2023. In the United Kingdom, the show premiered on E4 in January 2014. The second season debuted on January 15, 2015, the third began on January 7, 2016, and the fourth on January 5, 2017. The fifth season aired on March 8, 2018, the sixth on March 28, 2019, and the seventh on March 26, 2020. The series airs on RTÉ2 in Ireland. In New Zealand, Brooklyn Nine-Nine premiered on TV2 on February 13, 2014.

In India, Brooklyn Nine-Nine airs on Comedy Central India. In South Africa, the series premiered on SABC 3, in the 19:00 timeslot, airing Mondays to Fridays, where repeats aired on Sunday In Australia, it premiered on SBS on July 28, 2014, and airs repeats on Universal Channel from January 7, 2015. It moved to SBS 2 in 2015 commencing with the second season, which premiered on March 3, 2015. It has now moved to SBS Viceland, currently airing on Fridays at 8:30pm. In December 2014, Netflix UK added the first season to its listings, with Netflix Australia following suit in March 2015. Since 2016, Netflix UK, Australia, Germany, Austria, Latin America, and Switzerland have carried seasons 1 to 6 of Brooklyn Nine-Nine. The seventh season was added to Netflix UK on March 26, 2021. In South East Asia and Sri Lanka, Brooklyn Nine-Nine airs right after the U.S. on Diva.

In Brazil, the series was acquired by SBT, and is being shown on Sundays in the midnight on SBT after the Programa Silvio Santos. Especially because it contains the actor Terry Crews, who starred in sitcom Everybody Hates Chris, shown successfully on weekends by the competition Record TV.

=== French Canadian adaptation ===
A French Canadian adaptation of the series, titled Escouade 99 (translates to 'Squad Ninety-Nine'), debuted on the Québec streaming platform Club Illico in 2020. Set in Quebec City, Escouade 99 had a budget of $4 million Canadian for the first season of the series, which is approximately the same budget as a single episode of Brooklyn Nine-Nine. Following the release of the first trailer, Fumero criticized the casting, specifically that of white actresses in the roles based on Amy Santiago and Rosa Diaz. Escouade 99 cast a second season in 2021.

== Home media ==
DVD releases of Brooklyn Nine-Nine
Season	DVD release date			Special features
Season	Region 1	Region 2	Region 4	Special features
Season 1	September 23, 2014	September 29, 2014	December 11, 2014	Deleted Scenes
Season 2	September 8, 2015	September 28, 2015	September 3, 2015	Deleted Scenes
Season 3	August 23, 2016	August 22, 2016	September 29, 2016	Deleted Scenes, Get Your Cop On, The Squad
Season 4	August 22, 2017	September 4, 2017	September 20, 2017	Deleted Scenes
Season 5	August 28, 2018	November 19, 2018	September 19, 2018	Deleted Scenes
Season 6	August 20, 2019	August 26, 2019	August 28, 2019	Deleted Scenes
Season 7	June 30, 2020	August 3, 2020	July 15, 2020	
Season 8	March 8, 2022	February 21, 2022	February 16, 2022	
The Complete Series	March 8, 2022	February 21, 2022		Deleted Scenes, Get Your Cop On, The Squad

Blu-ray releases of Brooklyn Nine-Nine
The Complete Series 1–8	Region A
The Complete Series 1–8	March 8, 2022
