= Mattress (disambiguation) =

A mattress is a soft, cushioned pad on which a person can lie and sleep.

Mattress may also refer to:

- Mattress (rocket), a multiple rocket launcher during World War II
- "Mattress" (Glee), an episode
- "The Mattress" (Brooklyn Nine-Nine), an episode

== See also ==
- Mattress Performance (Carry That Weight)
