= Adrian Pimento =

Adrian Pimento may refer to:

- "Adrian Pimento" (Brooklyn Nine-Nine episode), an episode of the third season of Brooklyn Nine-Nine
- Adrian Pimento, a recurring character in Brooklyn Nine-Nine
