= The Funeral (Brooklyn Nine-Nine) =

- Brooklyn Nine-Nine episode
- Episode no.: Season 3 Episode 2
- Directed by: Claire Scanlon
- Written by: Luke Del Tredici
- Cinematography by: Giovani Lampassi
- Editing by: Cortney Carrillo
- Production code: 302
- Original air date: October 4, 2015
- Running time: 22 minutes

Guest appearances
- Archie Panjabi as Lieutenant Singh; Jon Daly as Bram Applebaum; Beth Hoyt as Margaret Dozerman; Dean Winters as Keith "The Vulture" Pembroke

Episode chronology
← Previous "New Captain"	Next → "Boyle's Hunch"
- Brooklyn Nine-Nine season 3

"The Funeral" is the second episode of the third season of the American television police sitcom series Brooklyn Nine-Nine. It is the 47th overall episode of the series and is written by Luke Del Tredici and directed by Claire Scanlon. It aired on Fox in the United States on October 4, 2015.

The show revolves around the fictitious 99th precinct of the New York Police Department in Brooklyn and the officers and detectives that work in the precinct. In the episode, The Vulture has taken over as the new Captain in the 99th precinct and tries to interfere with Jake and Amy's relationship. Meanwhile, Holt returns to the precinct with a PR problem and asks Terry for help, while Boyle begins a sexual relationship with a colleague.

The episode was seen by an estimated 4.10 million household viewers and gained a 1.9/5 ratings share among adults aged 18–49, according to Nielsen Media Research. The episode received positive reviews from critics, who praised Terry Crews' performance in the episode as well as the funeral scenes.

== Plot ==
While the precinct gets ready for Dozerman's funeral, The Vulture (Dean Winters) continues annoying everyone with his behavior. In an attempt to mitigate it, Jake (Andy Samberg) attempts to befriend him, but the Vulture discovers that he is not sincere, and retaliates by ordering Jake to end his relationship with Amy (Melissa Fumero) or face being demoted to beat cop.

At the funeral ceremony, Jake and Amy try to show the Chief of Detectives evidence of the Vulture's actions, as they had recorded him demanding they end their relationship. However, their attempts to show it become problematic when Dozerman's wife confuses Jake for one of Dozerman's friends who went on fishing trips involving prostitutes that nearly ended their marriage. The Vulture finds the recording and retrieves it.

Meanwhile, Holt (Andre Braugher) and Gina (Chelsea Peretti) show up at the precinct with a PR problem. Holt is asked to give a speech after the funeral but can't come up with anything positive to say. Later, Terry (Terry Crews) attempts to help Holt with the problem, but both end up drunk and complain about their working conditions. After listening to Jake's speech about how he refuses to give up on his relationship with Amy no matter what the future has in store, Holt gets the Vulture publicity to stop him from interfering in Jake and Amy's lives.

Boyle (Joe Lo Truglio) tries to have casual sex with a colleague during Dozerman's funeral but breaks up with her after learning she is vegan. Later, he tells Gina and Rosa (Stephanie Beatriz) that he wants to pursue a serious relationship.

== Reception ==
=== Viewers ===
In its original American broadcast, "The Funeral" was seen by an estimated 4.10 million household viewers and gained a 1.9/5 ratings share among adults aged 18–49, according to Nielsen Media Research. This was a 30% increase in viewership from the previous episode, which was watched by 3.14 million viewers with a 1.5/4 in the 18-49 demographics. This means that 1.9 percent of all households with televisions watched the episode, while 5 percent of all households watching television at that time watched it. With these ratings, Brooklyn Nine-Nine was the second most watched show on FOX for the night, beating The Last Man on Earth and Family Guy, but behind The Simpsons, third on its timeslot and fourth for the night, behind Quantico, The Simpsons, and Sunday Night Football.

=== Critical reviews ===
"The Funeral" received positive reviews from critics. LaToya Ferguson of The A.V. Club gave the episode an "A−" grade and wrote, "Of the two episodes that Brooklyn Nine-Nine has provided for season three so far, the show is doing quite a good job of working with the amount of change that is happening in its world, and that's an excellent sign. It's great to be surprised by a show's choices, and that's exactly what Brooklyn Nine-Nine is doing this season." Allie Pape from Vulture gave the show a perfect 5 star rating out of 5 and wrote, "With so much going on in the A- and B-plots, the C-plot about Boyle's attempt to go all the way with his ongoing funeral hookup definitely suffered from being cut for time."

Alan Sepinwall of HitFix wrote, "Fortunately, there was a lot of funny stuff happening around the spectacle of the show's two most sensible characters drinking too much after a very bad day." Andy Crump of Paste gave the episode an 8.0 rating and wrote, "The one problem with 'The Funeral' emphasizing Boyle's sadsack melancholy is that Gina and Rosa wind up caught in his gravitational pull and find little to do but react to his uncharacteristic display of debauchery."
