= Hostage Situation (Brooklyn Nine-Nine) =

- Brooklyn Nine-Nine episode
- Episode no.: Season 3 Episode 11
- Directed by: Max Winkler
- Written by: Phil Augusta Jackson
- Cinematography by: Giovani Lampassi
- Editing by: Sandra Montiel
- Production code: 312
- Original air date: January 5, 2016
- Running time: 22 minutes

Guest appearances
- Kathryn Hahn as Eleanor Horstweil; Mary Lynn Rajskub as Genevieve Mirren-Carter; Kyle S. More as Steve Henderson

Episode chronology
← Previous "Yippie Kayak"	Next → "9 Days"
- Brooklyn Nine-Nine season 3

"Hostage Situation" is the eleventh episode of the third season of the American television police sitcom series Brooklyn Nine-Nine. It is the 56th overall episode of the series and is written by Phil Augusta Jackson and directed by Max Winkler. It aired on Fox in the United States on January 5, 2016.

The show revolves around the fictitious 99th precinct of the New York Police Department in Brooklyn and the officers and detectives that work in the precinct. In the episode, Boyle and Genevieve decide to have children using Boyle's frozen sperm. However, Boyle's ex-wife, Eleanor, takes the sample and forces him to get her out of a lawsuit in exchange for the sample. Meanwhile, Amy hurts Terry while asking for a recommendation. Also, Rosa and Holt interrogate a perp who only will talk with Gina.

The episode was seen by an estimated 2.73 million household viewers and gained a 1.2/4 ratings share among adults aged 18–49, according to Nielsen Media Research. The episode received critical acclaim from critics, who praised the writing and the performances.

== Plot ==
In the cold open, Holt challenges a rude street dancer to a dance-off. Jake attempts to record it, but fails to get his phone out in time.

Boyle (Joe Lo Truglio) tells Jake (Andy Samberg) that he and Genevieve (Mary Lynn Rajskub) want to have a baby. He already had frozen sperm in a bank, which was from before he became sterile following an incident in which a perp hit his crotch.

Eleanor (Kathryn Hahn), Boyle's ex-wife, shows up at the precinct. The sperm bank account is on her name, so she retrieved the sperm and tells Boyle that she is facing a lawsuit after hitting an elderly priest pedestrian with her car and he has to make him drop it or she'll drop the sperm. After failing to get the sperm, Boyle handcuffs Jake and tries to intimidate the priest. However, Jake frees himself and tazes Boyle before he could do so. Jake tells Boyle that he could be the father through another donor, as he will father the child anyway. With this, Boyle decides to abandon trying to get the sperm and decides to look for another donor.

Meanwhile, Amy (Melissa Fumero) asks Terry (Terry Crews) for a recommendation for a mentorship program, which he accepts to do. However, during a defense class, Amy accidentally breaks his nose. Later, Amy finds that she didn't get into the program and confronts Terry, who angrily says that he sent the recommendation. Then, Terry finds that he sent it to the wrong program, but still manages to get Amy into the program.

Also, Rosa (Stephanie Beatriz) and Holt (Andre Braugher) arrest a perp (Kyle S. More), who only wants to speak with Gina (Chelsea Peretti). Gina brags about it being an opportunity to show off her interrogation skills, only to find out that he only wanted to talk to her because they used to be classmates in school. She ends up failing to get anything out of him as she doesn't remember him. Following this, Rosa and the perp then talk about Gina, after which he finally confesses to the crime while complaining about her.

== Reception ==
=== Viewers ===
In its original American broadcast, "Hostage Situation" was seen by an estimated 2.73 million household viewers and gained a 1.2/4 ratings share among adults aged 18–49, according to Nielsen Media Research. This was a 29% decrease in viewership from the previous episode, which was watched by 3.82 million viewers with a 1.7/5 in the 18–49 demographics. This means that 1.2 percent of all households with televisions watched the episode, while 4 percent of all households watching television at that time watched it. With these ratings, Brooklyn Nine-Nine was the second most watched show on FOX for the night, beating The Grinder and Grandfathered, but behind New Girl, fourth on its timeslot and ninth for the night, behind Shark Tank, Hollywood Game Night, New Girl, Limitless, Chicago Fire, Chicago Med, NCIS: New Orleans, and NCIS.

=== Critical reviews ===
"Hostage Situation" received critical acclaim from critics. LaToya Ferguson of The A.V. Club gave the episode an "A" grade and wrote, "Brooklyn Nine-Nine is on a hot streak right now, earning points with very strong individual episodes despite a season-long narrative arc that’s not as clearly-defined as season two's." Allie Pape from Vulture gave the show a 4 star rating out of 5 and wrote, "What I find interesting about this week's B99 is that it follows the same basic premise as the one before it — a hostage situation — but spins it in a completely different direction."

Alan Sepinwall of HitFix wrote, "The show's first episode in its new/old Tuesday home wasn't one of the season's best, but if this and The Grinder (I haven't seen this week's episode yet) should make for a damn good hour of comedy going forward." Andy Crump of Paste gave the episode a 9.1 rating and wrote, "Maybe human reproduction isn't all it's cracked up to be. Maybe Eleanor is just totally heinous, and maybe it isn't worth helping her duck lawful comeuppance in exchange for iced-down seed. And maybe Brooklyn Nine-Nine's streak of incredible third season outings can't last forever, but there's no reason to wish away the series' sustained excellence, either."
