= The 9-8 =

- Brooklyn Nine-Nine episode
- Episode no.: Season 3 Episode 15
- Directed by: Nisha Ganatra
- Written by: David Phillips
- Cinematography by: Giovani Lampassi
- Editing by: Cortney Carrillo
- Production code: 315
- Original air date: February 9, 2016
- Running time: 22 minutes

Guest appearance
- Damon Wayans Jr. as Stevie Schillens

Episode chronology
← Previous "Karen Peralta"	Next → "House Mouses"
- Brooklyn Nine-Nine season 3

"The 9-8" is the fifteenth episode of the third season of the American television police sitcom series Brooklyn Nine-Nine. It is the 60th overall episode of the series and is written by David Phillips and directed by Nisha Ganatra. It aired on Fox in the United States on February 9, 2016.

The show revolves around the fictitious 99th precinct of the New York Police Department in Brooklyn and the officers and detectives that work in the precinct. In the episode, Jake Peralta (Andy Samberg) and his old friend Stevie Schillens (Damon Wayans Jr.) reunite after their precincts are merged, leaving Charles Boyle (Joe Lo Truglio) feeling sidelined. Meanwhile, the rest of the 9-9 has to endure the other precinct, whose bad habits are driving them crazy.

The episode was seen by an estimated 2.28 million household viewers and gained a 1.0/3 ratings share among adults aged 18–49, according to Nielsen Media Research. The episode received critical acclaim from critics who praised the performances (particularly Lo Truglio and Wayans Jr.).

== Plot ==
In the cold open, Gina auctions off a suitcase from the 1970s they've had in the lost-and-found. Jake wins by allowing her the chance to spray tan and determine his wardrobe and hair for the next week.

Due to a plumbing problem, the 98th precinct is forced to be relocated to the 99th precinct while the problem is fixed. The problem reunites Jake (Andy Samberg) with Stevie Schillens (Damon Wayans Jr.), his old friend from the precinct. Boyle (Joe Lo Truglio) begins to feel sidelined by their new friendship.

Jake, Boyle and Stevie begin working on a drug dealer who frequents a bar. They arrest the dealer but fail to find any drugs, but due to a parole violation, they get permission to search his apartment, finding drugs. Meanwhile, the precinct is subsequently filled with the 9-8, whose bad habits annoy the precinct, particularly Terry (Terry Crews), Rosa (Stephanie Beatriz), and Amy (Melissa Fumero). After meeting Hitchcock (Dirk Blocker) and Scully (Joel McKinnon Miller) on the roof, they decide to move their workplace to the roof to operate. Captain Holt (Andre Braugher) finds out and forces them to return to the precinct, despite having his office taken by the Deputy Inspector.

At the precinct, Boyle tells Jake that he saw Stevie planting the drugs in an attempt to arrest the dealer, and they get into a conflict. Jake then confronts Stevie, who admits planting and they, along with Boyle, get into a fight. Their fight initiates chaos in the precinct between the 9-8 and the 9-9. Holt then seizes the opportunity to break the heater, as the Deputy Inspector has been annoying him as well, forcing the 9-8 to relocate again. Jake and Boyle sing while driving with Stevie in their custody.

== Reception ==
=== Viewers ===
In its original American broadcast, "The 9-8" was seen by an estimated 2.28 million household viewers and gained a 1.0/3 ratings share among adults aged 18–49, according to Nielsen Media Research. This was a slight increase in viewership from the previous episode, which was watched by 2.24 million viewers with a 1.0/3 in the 18-49 demographics. This means that 1.0 percent of all households with televisions watched the episode, while 3 percent of all households watching television at that time watched it. With these ratings, Brooklyn Nine-Nine was the second most watched show on FOX for the night, beating The Grinder and Grandfathered, but behind New Girl, third on its timeslot and tenth for the night, behind Hollywood Game Night, Fresh Off the Boat, Limitless, New Girl, The Flash, Chicago Med, Chicago Fire, NCIS: New Orleans, and NCIS.

=== Critical reviews ===
"The 9-8" received critical acclaim from critics. LaToya Ferguson of The A.V. Club gave the episode an "A" grade and wrote, "It feels safe to say this three seasons in: The men and women of the Nine-Nine are very much set in their ways. Sure, there's character growth, which is always a beautiful thing to see in the series. But they really don't react well to change, temporary or otherwise." Allie Pape from Vulture gave the show a perfect 5 star rating out of 5 and wrote, "Given the massive episode orders they must fill, network sitcom writers are often tempted to subdivide their stories into neat A-, B-, and C-plots that don't relate thematically or dovetail together. That's why it’s nice to see an occasional episode like 'The 9-8' to come in and shake things up."

Alan Sepinwall of HitFix wrote, "I don't always love Brooklyn episodes where the squadroom fills up past capacity, as the show tends to get too frantic for its own good in those stories. 'The 9-8' worked, though, because it dealt with the invasion from the other precinct on two levels." Andy Crump of Paste gave the episode a 9.0 rating and wrote, "So you kind of know that 'The 9-8' is going to end in altercations and animosity, though watching the set turn into a riff on Blazing Saddles remains nothing short of an acrimonious delight. It is the perfect payoff to an episode that builds pent up frustrations across each of its plot lines, though really the A/B/C structure is mostly boiled down to A and B."
