= Boyle's Hunch =

- Brooklyn Nine-Nine episode
- Episode no.: Season 3 Episode 3
- Directed by: Trent O'Donnell
- Written by: Tricia McAlpin
- Cinematography by: Giovani Lampassi
- Editing by: Cortney Carrillo
- Production code: 304
- Original air date: October 11, 2015
- Running time: 22 minutes

Guest appearances
- Mary Lynn Rajskub as Genevieve Mirren-Carter; James Urbaniak as Nick Lingeman; Stormi Henley as Dvora; Gabe Liedman as Oliver Cox

Episode chronology
← Previous "The Funeral"	Next → "The Oolong Slayer"
- Brooklyn Nine-Nine season 3

"Boyle's Hunch" is the third episode of the third season of the American television police sitcom series Brooklyn Nine-Nine. It is the 48th overall episode of the series and is written by Tricia McAlpin and directed by Trent O'Donnell. It aired on Fox in the United States on October 11, 2015.

The show revolves around the fictitious 99th precinct of the New York Police Department in Brooklyn and the officers and detectives that work in the precinct. In the episode, Boyle might have met his soul-mate in Genevieve, an art gallery owner. However, when she's declared guilty of stealing art, he and Jake set out to prove her innocence. Meanwhile, Rosa deals with intra-precinct theft and Holt seeks Amy's help with an image campaign.

The episode was seen by an estimated 2.75 million household viewers and gained a 1.3/4 ratings share among adults aged 18–49, according to Nielsen Media Research. The episode received positive reviews from critics, who praised Joe Lo Truglio's performance and the ice cream theft subplot.

== Plot ==
In the cold open, Jake brings a pet tarantula to the precinct that he found in a drug bust. He ends up losing it before finding it on Terry, who fears tarantulas.

While Jake (Andy Samberg) and Boyle (Joe Lo Truglio) wait in the courthouse, Boyle meets Genevieve (Mary Lynn Rajskub), an art gallery owner, and instantly falls in love with her as they both have common interests. However, he is dismayed when Genevieve, revealed as the defendant of the case, is declared guilty of insurance fraud and sentenced to ten years in prison.

Setting out to prove her innocence, Jake and Boyle go to Genevieve's ex-boyfriend Nick's (James Urbaniak) art gallery to discover if he framed her. However, Boyle loses control once Nick describes when he and Genevieve covered themselves in paint and had sex on a canvas for 24 straight hours to make a painting. Nick's assistant Dvora (Stormi Henley) confirms his alibi that at the time of the robbery he was doing public performance art. After inspecting a storage unit Genevieve ordered, they find the stolen art in the unit, which convinces them that Genevieve stole it. However, Jake does his own research and concludes that Dvora is the culprit, as she's in love with Nick while the unit was rented on the canvas day. As a result, Genevieve is released from prison.

Meanwhile, Rosa (Stephanie Beatriz) is convinced Hitchcock (Dirk Blocker) and Scully (Joel McKinnon Miller) stole her ice cream and teams up with Terry (Terry Crews) to prove it. Hitchcock and Scully repeatedly deny it when confronted with evidence, but eventually confess after eating cheese pizza given to them, as they had previously said they were innocent due to being lactose-intolerant. Nonetheless, she remains mournful over her dessert.

Holt (Andre Braugher) invites Amy (Melissa Fumero) to a promotional campaign for the police, despite protests from Gina (Chelsea Peretti). Amy is used as an image on posters, but her image is vandalized for backlash, which prompts Holt to apologize to Gina. He ultimately runs a new campaign displaying his own email address, soliciting criticism and advice from the public which Holt vows to personally respond to.

== Reception ==
=== Viewers ===
In its original American broadcast, "Boyle's Hunch" was seen by an estimated 2.75 million household viewers and gained a 1.3/4 ratings share among adults aged 18–49, according to Nielsen Media Research. This was a 33% decrease in viewership from the previous episode, which was watched by 4.10 million viewers with a 1.9/5 in the 18-49 demographics. This means that 1.3 percent of all households with televisions watched the episode, while 4 percent of all households watching television at that time watched it. With these ratings, Brooklyn Nine-Nine was the third most watched show on FOX for the night, beating Bob's Burgers and The Last Man on Earth, but behind Family Guy and The Simpsons, fifth on its timeslot and eight for the night, behind Family Guy, The Simpsons, Madam Secretary, Once Upon a Time, Quantico, 60 Minutes, and Sunday Night Football.

=== Critical reviews ===
"Boyle's Hunch" received positive reviews from critics. LaToya Ferguson of The A.V. Club gave the episode a "B−" grade and wrote, "After two episodes of new captain shenanigans, Brooklyn Nine-Nine decides to get back into the groove of 'normalcy,' focusing more on the everyday work life of the characters than the characters' reactions to all of these changes." Allie Pape from Vulture gave the show a 4 star rating out of 5 and wrote, "Of course, one of the things that makes B99 such an enjoyable watch is that it can address these issues before comfortably shifting back into a goofy and pure-fun C-plot like having Terry and Rosa catch Hitchcock, and Scully stealing Rosa’s Moose Tracks."

Alan Sepinwall of HitFix wrote, "By now, 'Brooklyn Nine-Nine' is a stage where it has a lot of old reliables, joke-wise. Anytime a scene needs a laugh, the show can always lean on Terry announcing his like of something unexpected, or Holt uttering an amusing word or phrase, or Santiago struggling to contain her enthusiasm for something no one else cares about." Andy Crump of Paste gave the episode an 8.4 rating and wrote, "'Boyle's Hunch' is a solid half hour of television. It isn't flawless — you'd think the show would put just a tad more effort into changing the tone of the department now that The Vulture is in charge, and that Holt wouldn't be interacting so much with his former employees as he has been — but whether Jake and Boyle are throwing around spider puns on celebrity names, or singing their own detective-based version of 'My Humps,' or Rosa is threatening to bring agonizing doom down upon Hitchcock and Scully, it's very, very funny."
