= Apollo Robbins =

American consultant and sleight-of-hand artist (born 1974)

- Born: May 23, 1974 (age 52); Plainview, Texas, U.S.
- Occupations: Security consultant, magician

Apollo Robbins (born May 23, 1974) is an American sleight-of-hand artist, security consultant, self-described gentleman thief and deception specialist. Forbes has called him "an artful manipulator of awareness".

== Early life ==
Robbins was born in Plainview, Texas. A soft-spoken man, Robbins has said, in various interviews, that he learned his skills from his two brothers. His father, he adds, was blind, and as a child, he had braces on his legs.

== Career ==
Robbins gained notoriety after pickpocketing Secret Service agents accompanying former President Jimmy Carter. He successfully stole, among other items, former President Carter's itinerary and the keys to his motorcade. The publicity led several law-enforcement groups to contact him about his techniques. Robbins explained to an interviewer, "I pick-pocketed one of Jimmy Carter's secret service agents. After that, I got approached [to consult] police departments and security individuals. I got to visit prisons and I started learning the thinking and skill set of real thieves."

In a 2013 profile in The New Yorker, writer Adam Green said, "Robbins, who lives in Las Vegas, is a peculiar variety-arts hybrid, known in the trade as a theatrical pickpocket. Among his peers, he is widely considered the best in the world at what he does, which is taking things from people's jackets, pants, purses, wrists, fingers, and necks, then returning them in amusing and mind-boggling ways."

=== Whizmob Inc. ===
In 2006, Robbins founded Whizmob Inc., a brain trust that offers law enforcement officials and ex-cons as subject matter experts on current fraud, theft, and scam trends.

== Personal life ==
Robbins is married to Vietnamese-American magician and mentalist Ava Do. They have one child. In 2012 they founded Ludus Development, a training and consulting collective that creates immersive training methodologies with a focus on experiential learning.

== In popular culture ==
Robbins has appeared several times on television. He was a guest on The View on January 22, 2008. He hosted TruTV's reality show, Real Hustle (Season 1, Episode 1, "The Distract and Conquer Con").

Robbins served as technical advisor on TNT's series Leverage, a heist film TV show starring Timothy Hutton and Christian Kane, also appearing in the 2nd Season's seventh episode, "The Two Live Crew Job" (2009).

Robbins appeared on Nova ScienceNow to illustrate some features of "how the brain works" on a 2011 episode, alongside fellow magician Penn Jillette, roboticist Rodney Brooks, neuroscientist David Eagleman, and others.

Also in 2011, Robbins appeared on the Australian television comedy series Lawrence Leung's Unbelievable, on an episode entitled "Magic," in which he was joined by stage magicians Lance Burton and Tim Ellis. In December 2011, he was one of many featured speakers in a documentary (a European co-production) about the brain entitled Das automatische Gehirn (The Automatic Brain).

National Geographic Channel's documentary show Brain Games kept Apollo fairly busy in 2013, inviting him to appear on several episodes which had such titles as "Illusion Confusion," "Power of Persuasion," and "Focus Pocus." He was given the title of consulting producer for two of these episodes.

Robbins was featured at TEDGlobal 2013 in June that year, and its YouTube video (posted in September 2013) went viral, with over 20 million views.

He guest starred in the episode "Halloween II" on the FOX show, Brooklyn Nine-Nine.

Robbins served as technical advisor on Warner Bros's 2015 movie Focus starring Will Smith and Margot Robbie. He was also featured in Blu-ray and DVD bonus features. In one scene, he appears as a man wearing a blue jacket and Robbie's character pickpockets from people in the street.

== See also ==
- Micromagic

== Sources ==
- "Magic for neuroscientists". Science News.
- "Autism Diagnoses and Treatments Could Be Found in Study of Magic - ABC News". Abcnews.go.com. November 10, 2009.
- "To Catch a Thief". Portfolio.com. June 9, 2008.
- "Apollo Robbins". Essential Magic Conference.
- Brian Lowry (January 21, 2008). "The Real Hustle". Variety.
