= Yippie Kayak =

- Brooklyn Nine-Nine episode
- Episode no.: Season 3 Episode 10
- Directed by: Rebecca Asher
- Written by: Lakshmi Sundaram
- Cinematography by: Giovani Lampassi
- Editing by: Sandra Montiel
- Production code: 310
- Original air date: December 13, 2015
- Running time: 22 minutes

Guest appearances
- Merrin Dungey as Sharon Jeffords; Jamal Duff as Zeke; Dean Winters as Keith "The Vulture" Pembroke

Episode chronology
← Previous "The Swedes"	Next → "Hostage Situation"
- Brooklyn Nine-Nine season 3

"Yippie Kayak" is the tenth episode of the third season of the American television police sitcom series Brooklyn Nine-Nine. It is the 55th overall episode of the series and is written by Lakshmi Sundaram and directed by Rebecca Asher. It aired on Fox in the United States on December 13, 2015.

The show revolves around the fictitious 99th precinct of the New York Police Department in Brooklyn and the officers and detectives that work in the precinct. In the episode, Jake, Boyle, and Gina head to a store to buy late Christmas gifts. However, the store turns out to be the center of a robbery, prompting Jake to have his "Die Hard moment." Meanwhile, Amy joins Holt and Rosa on their Polar Club swim. Also, Terry heads the hostage situation while having problems with the Vulture.

The episode was seen by an estimated 3.82 million household viewers and gained a 1.7/5 ratings share among adults aged 18–49, according to Nielsen Media Research. The episode received critical acclaim from critics, who praised the writing, performances and the homage to Die Hard, with some naming it among the best episodes of the show.

== Plot ==
In the cold open, Amy tries to bypass Holt's "no-gift" policy by leaving him a gift in an unmarked package on his desk, but Holt interprets it as a bomb and orders everyone to evacuate, much to her horror and Jake's amusement.

When Boyle (Joe Lo Truglio) arrives with Christmas gifts for the staff, Jake realizes that he forgot to get a gift for Boyle. He then asks for Gina's (Chelsea Peretti) help in finding a gift for him. However, they're joined by Boyle. Jake lies, saying that the gift is for Amy (Melissa Fumero).

While at the store, they find that thugs are in the middle of a robbery and have staged a hostage situation. Jake excitedly seizes this as an opportunity to act out a real life version of the film Die Hard. He informs Terry (Terry Crews), forcing him to leave his Christmas dinner and head the operation. However, Terry finds out that the Vulture (Dean Winters) is heading the operation. This disappoints him, as the Vulture exhibits an incompetent attitude. While all of this happens, Gina is also taken as a hostage.

Amy joins Holt (Andre Braugher) and Rosa's (Stephanie Beatriz) Polar Club swim despite them worrying about her willingness to enter the water due to the low temperatures. She proves their point, but she braves through the cold to inform them about the hostage situation. Back in the store, Jake and Boyle knock out some of the thugs and head to a hall where the hostages are being held. Jake lets himself get caught so that Boyle can enter through the vent. Boyle knocks out the main leader while the other thugs escape through sewers. Upon doing so, he mistakenly utters John McClane's catchphrase from Die Hard as "yippie kayak, other buckets," much to Jake's dismay. Terry decides to ignore the Vulture's orders to storm the building, as a raid may endanger the hostages, and forcibly relieves him of command. Using Jake's intel, he and the other officers arrest the remaining criminals. Jake explains his gift situation to Boyle and they make amends. Holt tells Terry that while he is suspended for breaking protocol, he has the makings of becoming a lieutenant.

== Reception ==
=== Viewers ===
In its original American broadcast, "Yippie Kayak" was seen by an estimated 3.82 million household viewers and gained a 1.7/5 ratings share among adults aged 18–49, according to Nielsen Media Research. This was a slight decrease in viewership from the previous episode, which was watched by 3.95 million viewers with a 1.7/5 in the 18-49 demographics. This means that 1.7 percent of all households with televisions watched the episode, while 5 percent of all households watching television at that time watched it. With these ratings, Brooklyn Nine-Nine was the second most watched show on FOX for the night, beating The Last Man on Earth and Family Guy, but behind The Simpsons, second on its timeslot and third for the night, behind The Simpsons, and Sunday Night Football.

=== Critical reviews ===
"Yippie Kayak" received critical acclaim from critics. LaToya Ferguson of The A.V. Club gave the episode an "A" grade and wrote, "In fact, 'Yippie Kayak' makes it clear that more Christmas episodes should deal with the three Fs: friendship, family, and flame throwers. Especially when those Fs are all blended together so well." Allie Pape from Vulture gave the show a 4 star rating out of 5 and wrote, "Three seasons in, it makes sense that someone on the writing staff would realize that Die Hard is a great Christmas movie, and thus a great framework for a Christmas episode."

Alan Sepinwall of HitFix wrote, "'Yippie Kayak,' in addition to being the series' most overt salute yet to the genius that is 'Die Hard,' was another reminder of just how much fun 'Brooklyn' can be when it narrows its focus a bit." Andy Crump of Paste gave the episode an 8.7 rating and wrote, "'Yippie Kayak' could have just been a lark and an excuse to finally bring Jake's love of Die Hard into the plot by making it the plot, but, as befits the holiday theme, the episode adds up to much more than a simple movie riff by making great use of its ensemble and bringing them all together."
