= Greg and Larry =

- Brooklyn Nine-Nine episode
- Episode no.: Season 3 Episode 23
- Directed by: Dan Goor
- Written by: Andrew Guest; Phil Augusta Jackson
- Cinematography by: Giovani Lampassi
- Editing by: Cortney Carrillo
- Production code: 323
- Original air date: April 19, 2016
- Running time: 22 minutes

Guest appearance
- Dennis Haysbert as Bob Annderson

Episode chronology
← Previous "Bureau"	Next → "Coral Palms"
- Brooklyn Nine-Nine season 3

"Greg and Larry" is the twenty-third episode and season finale of the third season of the American television police sitcom series Brooklyn Nine-Nine. It is the 68th overall episode of the series and is written by Andrew Guest & Phil Augusta Jackson and directed by Dan Goor. It aired on Fox in the United States on April 19, 2016.

The show revolves around the fictitious 99th precinct of the New York Police Department in Brooklyn and the officers and detectives that work in the precinct. In the episode, the squad manages to stop Annderson from killing Holt and seeks any help in finding more about Figgis' operation.

The episode was seen by an estimated 2.02 million household viewers and gained a 0.9/3 ratings share among adults aged 18–49, according to Nielsen Media Research. The episode received positive reviews from critics, who praised the writing in the episode and the ending.

== Plot ==
Raymond Holt (Andre Braugher) leaves the hospital room where Annderson (Dennis Haysbert) is watching over the FBI agent who is an informant for Jimmy "the Butcher" Figgis, but returns to find Annderson smothering the other agent. Annderson takes Holt hostage. Jake (Andy Samberg), Rosa (Stephanie Beatriz), Hitchcock (Dirk Blocker) and Scully (Joel McKinnon Miller) find the hospital room empty and begin looking for Holt and Annderson. They find Annderson holding Holt at gunpoint on the roof, but he is tackled by Terry (Terry Crews), who arrived with Gina (Chelsea Peretti).

While Boyle (Joe Lo Truglio) and Amy (Melissa Fumero) return from Texas, the gang tries to take Annderson out of the hospital. However, the hospital is filled with Figgis' henchmen. They decide to disguise themselves as doctors and disguise Bob and Gina as asylum patients, managing to fool the henchmen and escape the hospital. Taking shelter in Rosa's apartment, the squad takes turns in attempts to get the information from Annderson, but he refuses to talk. However, the apartment is suddenly attacked after someone tries to kill Annderson. While barricading, Annderson reveals the location of the files needed to take down Figgis' operation.

While Jake and Rosa fight the assailants, the rest hide in a panic room. In the panic room, Annderson explains that he turned into a traitor after the bureau misspelled his name on a letter of commendation and figured he would never get respect from them. Rosa lets them out, revealing that the attack was staged with the help of Amy and Boyle. Jake retrieves the files, also detailing Annderson's treason. One week later, Holt leads a toast in the bar to commemorate the arrest of 75 henchmen working for Figgis, although Figgis remains at large. While Jake and Amy talk about moving in together, Jake receives a call from Figgis, threatening his and Holt's lives. One month later, Holt and Jake are revealed to be living in Coral Palms, Florida on a witness protection program, using the names Greg and Larry, respectively.

== Reception ==
=== Viewers ===
In its original American broadcast, "Greg and Larry" was seen by an estimated 2.02 million household viewers and gained a 0.9/3 ratings share among adults aged 18–49, according to Nielsen Media Research. This was a slight decrease in viewership from the previous episode, which was watched by 2.07 million viewers with a 0.9/3 in the 18-49 demographics. This means that 0.9 percent of all households with televisions watched the episode, while 3 percent of all households watching television at that time watched it. With these ratings, Brooklyn Nine-Nine was the most watched show on FOX for the night, beating The Grinder and New Girl, fourth on its timeslot and ninth for the night, behind Agents of S.H.I.E.L.D., Limitless, The Flash, Chicago Med, NCIS: New Orleans, Chicago Fire, The Voice, and NCIS.

=== Critical reviews ===
"Greg and Larry" received positive reviews from critics. LaToya Ferguson of The A.V. Club gave the episode a "B" grade and wrote, "Plus, after last week's stellar 'The Bureau,' 'Greg And Larry' came into this having an uphill battle to climb. So while it's not the most epic episode of Brooklyn Nine-Nine ever, it gets the job done in terms of having each character, well, get the job done." Allie Pape from Vulture gave the show a 4 star rating out of 5 and wrote, "Given how much plot 'Greg and Larry' has to wind down in 22 minutes, it moves like one of B99's pokier installments, more concerned with delivering jokes than building any real tension. The jokes are great—B99's problem is rarely that they aren't—but it's more a whimper than a bang of a season-ender, aside from the series' standard last-30-seconds introduction of a game-changing plot line for the next season."

Alan Sepinwall of HitFix wrote, "'Greg and Larry' brought things to a satisfying conclusion that managed to continually find silly moments even as most of our heroes' lives were in danger from Bob and various Figgis soldiers." Andy Crump of Paste gave the episode a 9.0 rating and wrote, "Whatever. It's over. It's done. It's in the can. And it's solid all around, even if it's flawed. The biggest deal of all the big deals in "Greg and Larry" is the one that must not be spoken of, which is too bad; it's great, for one thing, and for another, it presents a seismic shift in Brooklyn Nine-Nine's identity as a sitcom."
