= Terry Kitties =

- Brooklyn Nine-Nine episode
- Episode no.: Season 3 Episode 19
- Directed by: Michael McDonald
- Written by: Phil Augusta Jackson & Tricia McAlpin
- Cinematography by: Giovani Lampassi
- Editing by: Cortney Carrillo
- Production code: 319
- Original air date: March 15, 2016
- Running time: 22 minutes

Guest appearances
- Jason Mantzoukas as Adrian Pimento; Matt Besser as Detective Holderton

Episode chronology
← Previous "Cheddar"	Next → "Paranoia"
- Brooklyn Nine-Nine season 3

"Terry Kitties" is the nineteenth episode of the third season of the American television police sitcom series Brooklyn Nine-Nine. It is the 64th overall episode of the series and is written by Phil Augusta Jackson & Tricia McAlpin and directed by Michael McDonald. It aired on Fox in the United States on March 15, 2016.

The show revolves around the fictitious 99th precinct of the New York Police Department in Brooklyn and the officers and detectives that work in the precinct. In the episode, Jake decides to help Terry solve an old case that has haunted him for twenty years. Meanwhile, Adrian Pimento moves in with Boyle, causing some problems. Also, Holt, Amy and Rosa participate in a bomb deactivate exercise.

The episode was seen by an estimated 1.95 million household viewers and gained a 0.8/3 ratings share among adults aged 18–49, according to Nielsen Media Research. The episode received very positive reviews from critics, who praised Crews' performance in the episode.

== Plot ==
In the cold open, Holt returns from his trip to Paris in a positive mood. Jake and the others attempt to take advantage of his "vacation high" by requesting a tank, only for Hitchcock and Scully to ruin their plans by making fun of Holt's weight and putting him in a bad mood.

Terry (Terry Crews) receives a package with a kitten, upsetting him. He tells Jake (Andy Samberg) that when he started working 20 years ago in a different precinct, he had to solve a case to prove himself. Tracking a robbery suspect, Terry led a raid on his apartment, only to discover he was in a wheelchair. In a panic, Terry accuses the suspect's cat of being an accomplice. This prompted laughter from his colleagues, who sent Terry kittens in subsequent years to remind him of his failure.

Jake decides to help Terry in solving the case to stop the constant humiliation. After getting in contact with the precinct, they follow a lead and ambush another suspect in a restroom, only to discover he is not the culprit, prompting the detectives to laugh at Terry again. Jake decides to continue the investigation and finds that the culprit is the man in the wheelchair, faking his condition. They catch him without the wheelchair and arrest him. While Terry is fine with not scolding his former colleagues, Jake sends rats to their precinct.

Meanwhile, Adrian (Jason Mantzoukas) is kicked out of his apartment for his constant screaming. When Boyle (Joe Lo Truglio) tells him he'll help him, Adrian invites himself to live with Boyle. Boyle is frustrated at Adrian's personality and behavior and wants to tell him to leave his house, but can't bring himself to do it. Gina (Chelsea Peretti) offers to help by telling Adrian off, saying that she can "alpha" him off, but Boyle intends on pleading to Adrian (like a "beta") for him to leave. When it doesn't work, he finally begs Gina to help him. She lashes out at Adrian, prompting him to leave the house. She thinks that she has proved the strength of the "alpha" but Boyle reveals that his plan all along was to manipulate her.

Also, Holt (Andre Braugher), Amy (Melissa Fumero) and Rosa (Stephanie Beatriz) participate in a bomb defusing exercise, competing between themselves. Despite Holt deactivating the bomb first, all but Hitchcock and Scully fail the exercise for not taking it seriously.

== Reception ==
=== Viewers ===
In its original American broadcast, "Terry Kitties" was seen by an estimated 1.95 million household viewers and gained a 0.8/3 ratings share among adults aged 18–49, according to Nielsen Media Research. This was a slight increase in viewership from the previous episode, which was watched by 1.85 million viewers with a 0.8/2 in the 18-49 demographics. This means that 0.8 percent of all households with televisions watched the episode, while 3 percent of all households watching television at that time watched it. With these ratings, Brooklyn Nine-Nine was the third most watched show on FOX for the night, beating The Grinder and a rerun of Grandfathered, but behind New Girl, third on its timeslot and tenth for the night, behind New Girl, Agents of S.H.I.E.L.D., The Real O'Neals, Fresh Off the Boat, Limitless, Crowded, NCIS: New Orleans, NCIS, and The Voice.

=== Critical reviews ===
"Terry Kitties" received very positive reviews from critics. LaToya Ferguson of The A.V. Club gave the episode an "A−" grade and wrote, "It's a silly episode, but it's also fast-paced in its silliness, which is key. At no point are any of the antics stretched out any further or longer than they need to be, a fact that is absolutely vital to the success of the Boyle/Pimento/Gina plot and is instantly apparent in the cold open." Allie Pape from Vulture gave the show a 4 star rating out of 5 and wrote, "That's why it was nice to get a Terry-centric episode this week (with Jake in tow, of course) that has nothing to do with any of his current woes. Instead, 'Terry Kitties' tackles a stubborn part of his past."

Alan Sepinwall of HitFix wrote, "Speaking of silly police officers, Brooklyn Nine-Nine definitely had its moments tonight with 'Terry Kitties,' including Terry's utter contempt for the kittens his ex-colleagues from the 65 kept sending him, Holt turning out to be more competitive ('Now who's... da bomb?') than Diaz and Santiago combined, and Gina helping Charles get out of having Pimento as a roommate." Andy Crump of Paste gave the episode a 7.8 rating and wrote, "Holt is capable of letting his competitive tendencies get the better of him; Boyle may be craftier than we've given him credit for in the past. Both of them, though, pale next to Crews, who of late has been a background fixture for Brooklyn Nine-Nine. 'Terry Kitties,' for obvious reasons, reasserts why he’s such a necessary component of what makes the show enduring and great."
