= Cheddar (Brooklyn Nine-Nine) =

- Brooklyn Nine-Nine episode
- Episode no.: Season 3 Episode 18
- Directed by: Alex Reid
- Written by: Jessica Polonsky
- Cinematography by: Giovani Lampassi
- Editing by: Sandra Montiel
- Production code: 318
- Original air date: March 1, 2016
- Running time: 22 minutes

Guest appearances
- Jason Mantzoukas as Adrian Pimento

Episode chronology
← Previous "Adrian Pimento"	Next → "Terry Kitties"
- Brooklyn Nine-Nine season 3

"Cheddar" is the eighteenth episode of the third season of the American television police sitcom series Brooklyn Nine-Nine. It is the 63rd overall episode of the series and is written by Jessica Polonsky and directed by Alex Reid. It aired on Fox in the United States on March 1, 2016.

The show revolves around the fictitious 99th precinct of the New York Police Department in Brooklyn and the officers and detectives that work in the precinct. In the episode, Jake and Amy decide to house-sit Holt's house while he visits Kevin. However, problems arise when their dog, Cheddar, runs away. Meanwhile, Rosa and Adrian tiptoe around their mutual attraction for one another.

The episode was seen by an estimated 1.85 million household viewers and gained a 0.8/2 ratings share among adults aged 18–49, according to Nielsen Media Research. The episode received positive reviews from critics, who praised the cast's performance.

== Plot ==
In the cold open, Jake receives his inheritance from his deceased rich uncle, only to find out it's one million shares in stock for Blockbuster Video.

Feeling that Holt (Andre Braugher) is lonely while Kevin is in Paris, Jake (Andy Samberg) proposes he and Amy (Melissa Fumero) babysit Holt's and Kevin's dog, Cheddar, so Holt can fly to Paris and meet with him. Jake also brings Boyle (Joe Lo Truglio), who just got eye surgery.

However, while house-sitting, Boyle's pants catch fire and Cheddar escapes the house. With Holt deciding to go back to the house after being notified of the fire, Jake asks the precinct for help and has Gina (Chelsea Peretti) delay Holt's return to the house. Despite their efforts, Holt finds out and dismisses them while he goes outside to find Cheddar. Suddenly, Jake and Amy use Kevin's binder to locate Cheddar at a park where he and Kevin used to go. Later Holt reveals to Jake and Amy that the reason he decided not to go to Paris was not because he was worried about the house but that he and Kevin were going through a difficult time and he didn't want to go to Paris and end up fighting with Kevin.

Meanwhile, while searching for Cheddar, Rosa (Stephanie Beatriz) and Adrian (Jason Mantzoukas) flirt throughout the search, making Terry (Terry Crews) uncomfortable. However, Adrian considers leaving her due to his nature but Terry convinces him otherwise by leaving his past behind.

== Reception ==
=== Viewers ===
In its original American broadcast, "Cheddar" was seen by an estimated 1.85 million household viewers and gained a 0.8/2 ratings share among adults aged 18–49, according to Nielsen Media Research. This was a slight decrease in viewership from the previous episode, which was watched by 2.13 million viewers with a 0.9/3 in the 18-49 demographics. This means that 0.8 percent of all households with televisions watched the episode, while 2 percent of all households watching television at that time watched it. With these ratings, Brooklyn Nine-Nine was the third most watched show on FOX for the night, beating The Grinder, but behind Grandfathered, and New Girl, second on its timeslot and tenth for the night, behind Grandfathered, CBS News: Campaign 2016, The Muppets, New Girl, Super Tuesday, NCIS: New Orleans, NCIS, and The Voice.

=== Critical reviews ===
"Cheddar" received positive reviews from critics. LaToya Ferguson of The A.V. Club gave the episode a "B" grade and wrote, "Sometimes you just need an episode of television that features cute dogs and weird sexual tension. That's something that Brooklyn Nine-Nine clearly understands, as that's what we get in this week's episode, 'Cheddar.'" Allie Pape from Vulture gave the show a perfect 5 star rating out of 5 and wrote, "If you want to short-circuit my critical faculties, you couldn't do better than some really intense sexual tension combined with an adorable dog, which is precisely what 'Cheddar' offers."

Alan Sepinwall of HitFix wrote, "On the whole, though, 'Cheddar' was one of those extremely frantic Brooklyn episodes that don't tend to work for me outside of isolated bits." Andy Crump of Paste gave the episode a 8.5 rating and wrote, "'Cheddar' is for the most part a fluff episode (no pun intended, though Cheddar is pretty fluffy), a charming one-off built around a single joke that it carries out to the best payoff possible. It's really only when we get to that payoff that we see that there is more to 'Cheddar,' and that there has been the entire time."
