= Ava (Brooklyn Nine-Nine) =

- Brooklyn Nine-Nine episode
- Episode no.: Season 3 Episode 8
- Directed by: Tristram Shapeero
- Written by: Matt O'Brien
- Cinematography by: Giovani Lampassi
- Editing by: Sandra Montiel
- Production code: 308
- Original air date: November 22, 2015
- Running time: 22 minutes

Guest appearances
- Nick Offerman as Frederick; Merrin Dungey as Sharon Jeffords

Episode chronology
← Previous "The Mattress"	Next → "The Swedes"
- Brooklyn Nine-Nine season 3

"Ava" is the eighth episode of the third season of the American television police sitcom series Brooklyn Nine-Nine. It is the 53rd overall episode of the series and is written by Matt O'Brien and directed by Tristram Shapeero. It aired on Fox in the United States on November 22, 2015.

The show revolves around the fictitious 99th precinct of the New York Police Department in Brooklyn and the officers and detectives that work in the precinct. In the episode, Terry leaves to solve a murder case and has Jake watch over his wife, who is in the late stages of her pregnancy. However, her water breaks, which leads to Jake panicking. All of this happens while the precinct suffers some problems from the Internet going down.

The episode was seen by an estimated 3.88 million household viewers and gained a 1.7/5 ratings share among adults aged 18–49, according to Nielsen Media Research. The episode received positive reviews from critics, who praised the cast's performances.

== Plot ==
In the cold open, Charles comes into the precinct dressed as a turkey named "Tommy Gobbler" only to be forced to tell a family what happened to their missing grandmother.

With Sharon's (Merrin Dungey) pregnancy in an advanced state, Terry (Terry Crews) asks Jake (Andy Samberg) to watch her while he and Rosa (Stephanie Beatriz) go to Rikers Island to work on a case. He also advises Jake to not let Holt (Andre Braugher) intervene, as he would cause stress on Sharon.

Bringing Sharon to the precinct, Jake finds that her water just broke and he seeks Gina's (Chelsea Peretti) help. Meanwhile, Sharon refuses to go to a hospital after bad reception during the last birth. Holt is also notified, but upon learning about why they tried to avoid him, he decides to step aside and give them his office. While all of this happens, the precinct is suffering from late paperwork, as the internet is down, which forces everyone to do the papers themselves. During all of this, a crowd protests in the precinct. Terry learns about Sharon's water breaking and heads back to the precinct as soon as he and Rosa get information on the case they were working.

After failing to calm Sharon, Jake asks Holt to call his ex-boyfriend, Frederick (Nick Offerman), who is a doctor. However, Holt and Frederick's relationship was tarnished when Holt threw Frederick's expensive decoy duck off a bridge. After making amends, Frederick visits the precinct and tells Jake that Sharon needs to go to the hospital. They convince her to go to the hospital and take her there. Terry arrives at the hospital as well, initially angry at Jake for taking his wife there. After a few hours, the child is born. The newborn is a girl that Terry and Sharon name Ava. Terry apologizes to Jake for his attitude and lets him meet his new godchild.

== Reception ==
=== Viewers ===
In its original American broadcast, "Ava" was seen by an estimated 3.88 million household viewers and gained a 1.7/5 ratings share among adults aged 18–49, according to Nielsen Media Research. This was a 44% increase in viewership from the previous episode, which was watched by 2.69 million viewers with a 1.3/4 in the 18-49 demographics. This means that 1.7 percent of all households with televisions watched the episode, while 5 percent of all households watching television at that time watched it. With these ratings, Brooklyn Nine-Nine was the second most watched show on FOX for the night, beating The Last Man on Earth and Family Guy, but behind The Simpsons, fourth on its timeslot and fourth for the night, behind The Simpsons, American Music Awards of 2015, and Sunday Night Football.

=== Critical reviews ===
"Ava" received positive reviews from critics. LaToya Ferguson of The A.V. Club gave the episode an "A" grade and wrote, "So, speaking of fun and gimmicky as hell, Brooklyn Nine-Nine's 'Ava' ticks both of those boxes. The episode leans into sweeps, without completely deconstructing or even really criticizing the entire concept, and it pretty much nails everything it has to do to be a sweeps episode." Allie Pape from Vulture gave the show a 4 star rating out of 5 and wrote, "After hosting a precinct-wide Thanksgiving at Amy's house in season one, Brooklyn Nine-Nine skipped the holiday entirely last year. This year, it's decided to split the difference, acknowledging Turkey Day without actually celebrating it."

Alan Sepinwall of HitFix wrote, "As always, you can't get through a 'Brooklyn' episode without a bunch of individually funny moments, but 'Ava' didn’t quite work overall." Andy Crump of Paste gave the episode an 8.6 rating and wrote, "'Ava' lets its characters be the best part of who they are, while flying through every holiday episode trope imaginable, but if the plot elements here feel familiar, they end up working because they're used in earnest. They're tropes for a reason, after all, and Brooklyn Nine-Nine historically makes good use of its clichés anyways; they're window dressing next to its character-based proclivities."
