= Maximum Security (Brooklyn Nine-Nine) =

- Brooklyn Nine-Nine episode
- Episode no.: Season 3 Episode 21
- Directed by: Victor Nelli Jr.
- Written by: Laura McCreary
- Cinematography by: Giovani Lampassi
- Editing by: Cortney Carrillo
- Production code: 321
- Original air date: April 5, 2016
- Running time: 22 minutes

Guest appearance
- Aida Turturro as Maura Figgis

Episode chronology
← Previous "Paranoia"	Next → "Bureau"
- Brooklyn Nine-Nine season 3

"Maximum Security" is the twenty-first episode of the third season of the American television police sitcom series Brooklyn Nine-Nine. It is the 66th overall episode of the series and is written by Laura McCreary and directed by Victor Nelli Jr. It aired on Fox in the United States on April 5, 2016.

The show revolves around the fictitious 99th precinct of the New York Police Department in Brooklyn and the officers and detectives that work in the precinct. In the episode, the squad begins their operation in finding Figgis' informant. After their plans to send Rosa to a maximum security prison and meet Figgis' sister backfire, they decide to send Amy instead. Meanwhile, the precinct attends a false funeral for Adrian in order to lure the hitman.

The episode was seen by an estimated 2.71 million household viewers and gained a 0.9/3 ratings share among adults aged 18–49, according to Nielsen Media Research. The episode received mixed-to-positive reviews from critics, who praised the cast's performance but the plot received more criticism.

== Plot ==
The squad prepares to begin the operation on finding Figgis and his FBI informant. As part of the plan, they stage Adrian's death certificate and begin planning a funeral. Also, Rosa (Stephanie Beatriz) has to go undercover on a maximum security prison in Rocksprings, Texas to get close to Figgis' sister, Maura (Aida Turturro) and posing like a pregnant woman.

Jake (Andy Samberg) and Boyle (Joe Lo Truglio) accompany Rosa and act as her OBGYN doctors. However, an inmate identifies Rosa and force them to send Amy (Melissa Fumero) instead. Throughout her attempts to get closer to Maura, Jake continuously brings her back to the offices because he fears for her safety. After reassuring things over, Jake decides to let her gain fame by letting her punch him on the floor to make her look bad. After this, she gains respect from Maura and is offered to join her gang.

Meanwhile, Holt (Andre Braugher), Terry (Terry Crews) and Gina (Chelsea Peretti) hold a false funeral for Adrian, in order to lure the hitman with the scarred hand. They also give Rosa advice on how to look grieving in order to convince the crowd. During a eulogy, the squad intercepts someone who runs away but instead is a pickpocket, not their hitman. Rosa manages to deliver a decent eulogy that shows her false grief.

== Reception ==
=== Viewers ===
In its original American broadcast, "Maximum Security" was seen by an estimated 2.71 million household viewers and gained a 0.9/3 ratings share among adults aged 18–49, according to Nielsen Media Research. This was a 34% increase in viewership from the previous episode, which was watched by 2.02 million viewers with a 0.9/3 in the 18-49 demographics. This means that 0.9 percent of all households with televisions watched the episode, while 3 percent of all households watching television at that time watched it. With these ratings, Brooklyn Nine-Nine was the second most watched show on FOX for the night, behind American Idol: American Dream, fourth on its timeslot and eleventh for the night, behind Agents of S.H.I.E.L.D., The Real O'Neals, Fresh Off the Boat, Limitless, The Voice, American Idol: American Dream, Chicago Med, Chicago Fire, NCIS: New Orleans, and NCIS.

=== Critical reviews ===
"Maximum Security" received mixed-to-positive reviews from critics. LaToya Ferguson of The A.V. Club gave the episode a "C+" grade and wrote, "Now that that's out of the way — while last week's 'Paranoia' was a set-up episode for the rest of this third season, this week's 'Maximum Security' is certainly a transitional episode. 'Filler' might even be the word for it, but it's not exactly all that filling. After all, we don't even get to see Rosa, Holt, and Terry throw things off the roof of a church. But in continuing with the big Jimmy 'The Butcher' Figgis plot, 'Maximum Security' makes some baby steps, immediately slowing things down right out the gate." Allie Pape from Vulture gave the show a perfect 5 star rating out of 5 and wrote, "After last week's relatively joke-light, blisteringly over-plotted episode, I was worried that B99 was going to keep up that grueling pace for the entirety of this closing three-episode finale arc. But 'Maximum Security' is a great installment of the show, keeping up some meaty plot mechanics without sacrificing the quirky, referential humor that makes it such a joy to watch."

Alan Sepinwall of HitFix wrote, "We're in the midst of an interesting experiment for the show as we near the end of season 3. Not only is this Pimento arc the most serialized Brooklyn has ever been, but it's also more dramatic than the series tends to be. It's not suddenly The Wire (though Jake would love that), but it wants us to believe that Pimento is really in fear for his life, that Diaz is genuinely upset about his absence, and that Santiago could really get hurt during this prison undercover operation." Andy Crump of Paste gave the episode a 7.9 rating and wrote, "Following up 'Paranoia' would be a tough act for just about any episode, but now that we're in full-on serialized mode, Brooklyn Nine-Nine has precious little time for screwing around and spinning wheels. 'Maximum Security' does too much of both, and regresses its character development just a smidge in the process. It isn't a bad episode — lord knows the show hasn't had one of those since around about 'Into the Woods,' which isn't 'bad' as much as it is 'below standard' — but it is surprisingly inert."
