= Bureau (Brooklyn Nine-Nine) =

- Brooklyn Nine-Nine episode
- Episode no.: Season 3 Episode 22
- Directed by: Ryan Case
- Written by: David Phillips & Alison Agosti
- Cinematography by: Giovani Lampassi
- Editing by: Sandra Montiel
- Production code: 322
- Original air date: April 12, 2016
- Running time: 22 minutes

Guest appearances
- Dennis Haysbert as Bob Annderson; Aida Turturro as Maura Figgis; Mary Lynn Rajskub as Genevieve Mirren-Carter (voice)

Episode chronology
← Previous "Maximum Security"	Next → "Greg and Larry"
- Brooklyn Nine-Nine season 3

"Bureau" is the twenty-second episode of the third season of the American television police sitcom series Brooklyn Nine-Nine. It is the 67th overall episode of the series and is written by David Phillips & Alison Agosti and directed by Ryan Case. It aired on Fox in the United States on April 12, 2016.

The show revolves around the fictitious 99th precinct of the New York Police Department in Brooklyn and the officers and detectives that work in the precinct. In the episode, Holt brings in a former partner, FBI Agent Bob Annderson, for assistance in catching the informant. Meanwhile, Amy continues trying to get closer to Maura while Terry and Gina investigate a leak on the precinct.

The episode was seen by an estimated 2.07 million household viewers and gained a 0.9/3 ratings share among adults aged 18–49, according to Nielsen Media Research. The episode received acclaim from critics, who praised the writing in the episode, as well as Dennis Haysbert's performance.

== Plot ==
Having problems in identifying Figgis' informant, Holt (Andre Braugher) calls his former partner, FBI Agent Bob Annderson (Dennis Haysbert) for help. After getting information of the description, Annderson deduces that fellow FBI Agent Ryan Whealon (Jon Root) may be the informant, while Amy (Melissa Fumero) continues getting closer to Maura Figgis (Aida Turturro).

They decide to go after Whealon's files, which are stored in the FBI building. With the help of Annderson, Jake (Andy Samberg), Holt and Rosa (Stephanie Beatriz) manage to retrieve the file from the building. Meanwhile, the precinct suffers a problem when the arrest count gets leaked and Terry (Terry Crews) and Gina (Chelsea Peretti) headline the investigation. However, Gina finds out that Terry accidentally leaked the count in a photo which he posted online.

Amy's investigation is disrupted when Maura develops feelings for Boyle (Joe Lo Truglio). The operation is also nearly jeopardized when Genevieve (Mary Lynn Rajskub) calls Boyle. Back in Brooklyn, the gang raids Whealon's house, finding him wounded. Deeming him the informant, Holt and Annderson stay in the hospital while Rosa and Jake leave. However, Amy calls Jake and tells him that Maura said that there's another informant: Annderson. Jake calls Holt, who is being held at gunpoint by Annderson (who also smothered Whealon).

== Reception ==
=== Viewers ===
In its original American broadcast, "Bureau" was seen by an estimated 2.07 million household viewers and gained a 0.9/3 ratings share among adults aged 18–49, according to Nielsen Media Research. This was a 24% decrease in viewership from the previous episode, which was watched by 2.71 million viewers with a 0.9/3 in the 18-49 demographics. This means that 0.9 percent of all households with televisions watched the episode, while 3 percent of all households watching television at that time watched it. With these ratings, Brooklyn Nine-Nine was the second most watched show on FOX for the night, beating The Grinder and a rerun of Grandfathered, behind New Girl, third on its timeslot and ninth for the night, behind Agents of S.H.I.E.L.D., New Girl, two reruns of NCIS: New Orleans, a rerun of NCIS, Game of Silence, and The Voice.

=== Critical reviews ===
"Bureau" received critical acclaim from critics. LaToya Ferguson of The A.V. Club gave the episode an "A" grade and wrote, "After a somewhat underwhelming dive (in large part to the set-up nature of the episode) into this season-ending arc, 'The Bureau' picks things back up and absolutely nails everything it sets out to do. And that's even before Captain Holt discusses Sex And The City. At length." Allie Pape from Vulture gave the show a 4 star rating out of 5 and wrote, "Though it was originally conceived as an action-comedy, Brooklyn Nine-Nine has definitely become more of a workplace sitcom since its early episodes, in part because it struggled to integrate its jokes with awkward, low-budget action sequences. That's why it's particularly impressive that 'Bureau,' part two of a three-part season finale arc, manages to nail a credibly tense heist sequence without neglecting its sense of humor."

Alan Sepinwall of HitFix wrote, "That Haysbert's Bob is so much like Holt is what allows 'The Bureau' to get away with its twist at the end. The episode very much telegraphs that Bob is up to more than he seems, first with his willingness to stage the heist, then in the business with the envelope." Andy Crump of Paste gave the episode a 9.0 rating and wrote, "That reads like a lot of 'stuff' for one episode to handle, but everything that happens in 'Bureau' happens under the umbrella of Operation 2256414 oh whatever, you get the idea. There's incredible harmony present in the intersection between each story thread, maybe more than we've seen elsewhere in Season Three."
