= The Oolong Slayer =

- Brooklyn Nine-Nine episode
- Episode no.: Season 3 Episode 4
- Directed by: Michael McDonald
- Written by: Gabe Liedman
- Cinematography by: Giovani Lampassi
- Editing by: Sandra Montiel
- Production code: 303
- Original air date: October 18, 2015
- Running time: 22 minutes

Guest appearances
- Kyra Sedgwick as Madeline Wuntch; Dean Winters as Keith "The Vulture" Pembroke

Episode chronology
← Previous "Boyle's Hunch"	Next → "Halloween III"
- Brooklyn Nine-Nine season 3

"The Oolong Slayer" is the fourth episode of the third season of the American television police sitcom series Brooklyn Nine-Nine. It is the 49th overall episode of the series and is written by Gabe Liedman and directed by Michael McDonald. It aired on Fox in the United States on October 18, 2015.

Brooklyn Nine-Nine revolves around the fictitious 99th precinct of the New York Police Department in Brooklyn, and the officers and detectives who work in the precinct. In the episode The Oolong Slayer, Jake seeks Holt's help in catching a serial killer named the Oolong Slayer, even if it could cost them their careers. Meanwhile, The Vulture makes Amy and Rosa plan his birthday party, and Terry gets addicted to cacao nibs.

The episode was seen by an estimated 2.57 million household viewers and gained a 1.2/3 ratings share among adults aged 18–49, according to Nielsen Media Research. The episode received positive reviews from critics, who praised performances by Samberg and Braugher. For his performance in the episode, Braugher was nominated for the Primetime Emmy Award for Outstanding Supporting Actor in a Comedy Series.

== Plot ==
The Vulture (Dean Winters) decides to give all the major cases to another unit in order to win a bet with another precinct, leaving the 99th with only misdemeanor cases. Nevertheless, Jake (Andy Samberg) finds a pattern in the recent cases that could link to the Oolong Slayer, a serial killer who's been on the loose for 10 years, and decides to pursue it despite the Vulture telling him not to.

Jake asks Holt (Andre Braugher) and Gina (Chelsea Peretti) for help in the case. Holt and Gina both secretly agree to help Jake. They follow a lead on a suspect, but discover he died a long time ago, and both are suspended by Wuntch (Kyra Sedgwick) and the Vulture (Dean Winters). However, Jake decides to continue working the case alone and finds the Oolong Slayer, but is held at gunpoint. Just then, Holt arrives and they catch the suspect, but Holt refuses to sign the arrest report as Wuntch would use it against him. Later, Jake meets with Chief Garmin (Tim Powell). Jake lets Garmin take credit for the arrest in exchange for reinstating Holt as captain. Both Holt and Gina are welcomed back to the precinct.

Meanwhile, The Vulture makes Rosa (Stephanie Beatriz) and Amy (Melissa Fumero) plan his birthday party. After failing to come up with ideas, they decide to hire the Vulture himself to play with his band and they end up embarrassing him. Also, Terry (Terry Crews) is given cacao nibs to calm his stress by Boyle (Joe Lo Truglio), but Terry gets addicted to the point that he begins gaining weight. Realizing Terry is eating due to the stress of the new baby, Boyle proposes a schedule that could help with his chores, which ends his addiction.

== Reception ==
=== Viewers ===
In its original American broadcast, "The Oolong Slayer" was seen by an estimated 2.57 million household viewers and gained a 1.2/3 ratings share among adults aged 18–49, according to Nielsen Media Research. This was a slight decrease in viewership from the previous episode, which was watched by 2.75 million viewers with a 1.3/4 in the 18-49 demographics. This means that 1.2 percent of all households with televisions watched the episode, while 3 percent of all households watching television at that time watched it. With these ratings, Brooklyn Nine-Nine was the second most watched show on FOX for the night, beating Bob's Burgers and The Last Man on Earth, but behind The Simpsons, fifth on its timeslot and seventh for the night, behind Madam Secretary, Once Upon a Time, Quantico, The Simpsons, 60 Minutes, and Sunday Night Football.

=== Critical reviews ===
"The Oolong Slayer" received positive reviews from critics. LaToya Ferguson of The A.V. Club gave the episode a "B+" grade and wrote, "As comforting as returning to the status quo will be, part of what's so interesting about this season so far is that it can go so many ways." Allie Pape from Vulture gave the show a perfect 5 star rating out of 5 and wrote, "Brooklyn Nine-Nine is having one hell of a third season so far, and this week's installment, in addition to having lots going on in the plot department, might be one of its funniest ever."

Alan Sepinwall of HitFix wrote, "'The Oolong Slayer' served his purpose and didn’t throw the show out of whack in the process." Andy Crump of Paste gave the episode an 8.9 rating and wrote, "It isn't an accident that 'The Oolong Slayer' is the funniest episode of the season so far, whether we're watching Holt, Jake, and Gina hunt for the slayer, or watching Rosa and Amy scheme up ways to prank The Vulture at his own soiree."
