= House Mouses =

- Brooklyn Nine-Nine episode
- Episode no.: Season 3 Episode 16
- Directed by: Claire Scanlon
- Written by: Andrew Guest
- Cinematography by: Giovani Lampassi
- Editing by: Sandra Montiel
- Production code: 316
- Original air date: February 16, 2016
- Running time: 22 minutes

Guest appearance
- Brad Hall as John William Weichselbraun

Episode chronology
← Previous "The 9-8"	Next → "Adrian Pimento"
- Brooklyn Nine-Nine season 3

"House Mouses" is the sixteenth episode of the third season of the American television police sitcom series Brooklyn Nine-Nine. It is the 61st overall episode of the series and is written by Andrew Guest and directed by Claire Scanlon. It aired on Fox in the United States on February 16, 2016.

The show revolves around the fictitious 99th precinct of the New York Police Department in Brooklyn and the officers and detectives that work in the precinct. In the episode, Jake changes a drug case with Hitchcock and Scully to work on a robbery on a celebrity. However, the drug case turns out to be bigger than expected, putting them in danger. Meanwhile, Boyle and Holt work to help the celebrity while Amy and Gina help Rosa overcome her fear of needles.

The episode was seen by an estimated 2.18 million household viewers and gained a 0.9/3 ratings share among adults aged 18–49, according to Nielsen Media Research. The episode received positive reviews from critics, who praised Blocker's and Miller's performance in the episode as well as Holt's storyline.

== Plot ==
In the cold open, Gina catches the detectives eating treats from a French gift basket delivered to Holt from his husband, Kevin. After realizing their mistake, they salvage it by replacing the food with various desk items that Holt appreciates.

Holt (Andre Braugher) announces that a high-profile celebrity has been robbed, which attracts Jake's (Andy Samberg) attention. Jake then gets on to change his drug case with Hitchcock (Dirk Blocker) and Scully (Joel McKinnon Miller) in order to work on the celebrity with Boyle (Joe Lo Truglio).

However, the celebrity turns out to be an oboist who lost his oboe and the drug case looks to be even bigger than expected as it is connected to a major narcotics ring. After fighting with Terry (Terry Crews) for handing the case to them, Jake and Terry search for Hitchcock and Scully. They find Scully, but Hitchcock is kidnapped by the dealers. Infiltrating the hideout, Jake, Terry and Scully are kidnapped as well and tied to chairs. Hitchcock and Scully manage to break free from the chairs and arrest the dealers. As a result, they're awarded new chairs in the precinct.

Meanwhile, Boyle continues the investigation on the robbery of the oboist John William Weichselbraun (Brad Hall), whom Holt admires. After Holt spends time with Weichselbraun, Boyle finds out that Weichselbraun stole his own oboe for the insurance money, which disappoints Holt. Also, Amy (Melissa Fumero) and Gina (Chelsea Peretti) help Rosa (Stephanie Beatriz) fight her fear of needles by fighting their own fears: Amy's claustrophobia and Gina's fear of businessmen.

== Reception ==
=== Viewers ===
In its original American broadcast, "House Mouses" was seen by an estimated 2.18 million household viewers and gained a 0.9/3 ratings share among adults aged 18–49, according to Nielsen Media Research. This was a slight decrease in viewership from the previous episode, which was watched by 2.28 million viewers with a 1.0/3 in the 18-49 demographics. This means that 0.9 percent of all households with televisions watched the episode, while 3 percent of all households watching television at that time watched it. With these ratings, Brooklyn Nine-Nine was the second most watched show on FOX for the night, beating The Grinder and Grandfathered, but behind New Girl, third in its timeslot and tenth for the night, behind Hollywood Game Night, New Girl, Limitless, Fresh Off the Boat, Chicago Med, The Flash, Chicago Fire, NCIS: New Orleans, and NCIS.

=== Critical reviews ===
"House Mouses" received positive reviews from critics. LaToya Ferguson of The A.V. Club gave the episode a "B" grade and wrote, "'House Mouses' a funny episode, filled to the brim with great line-readings, as unsettling as some are. But it's also an episode that's just as integral as Scully and Hitchcock when you really think about it." Allie Pape from Vulture gave the show a 4 star rating out of 5 and wrote, "'House Mouses' erases that hidden competence, though, sticking with the more tired story that the anything-but-dynamic duo can't really handle themselves on a case at all."

Alan Sepinwall of HitFix wrote, "As a result, I've long been a sucker for an episode like 'House Mouses,' where background characters like Hitchcock and Scully get to step to the front and have their moment."
