= Karen Peralta =

- Brooklyn Nine-Nine episode
- Episode no.: Season 3 Episode 14
- Directed by: Bruce McCulloch
- Written by: Alison Agosti & Gabe Liedman
- Cinematography by: Giovani Lampassi
- Editing by: Sandra Montiel
- Production code: 314
- Original air date: February 2, 2016
- Running time: 22 minutes

Guest appearances
- Bradley Whitford as Roger Peralta; Katey Sagal as Karen Peralta

Episode chronology
← Previous "The Cruise"	Next → "The 9-8"
- Brooklyn Nine-Nine season 3

"Karen Peralta" is the fourteenth episode of the third season of the American television police sitcom series Brooklyn Nine-Nine. It is the 59th overall episode of the series and is written by Alison Agosti & Gabe Liedman and directed by Bruce McCulloch. It aired on Fox in the United States on February 2, 2016.

The show revolves around the fictitious 99th precinct of the New York Police Department in Brooklyn and the officers and detectives that work in the precinct. In the episode, Jake and Amy visit Jake's mother, Karen, for his birthday. However, they find that she and Roger have gotten back together. Meanwhile, Boyle accidentally is exposed on a camera while not using clothes and Holt, Gina, Hitchcock and Scully participate in an escape room exercise.

The episode was seen by an estimated 2.24 million household viewers and gained a 1.0/3 ratings share among adults aged 18–49, according to Nielsen Media Research. The episode received generally positive reviews from critics, who praised Sagal's and Whitford's performances but the storylines received a more mixed response.

== Plot ==
In the cold open, Jake attempts to show off his self-balancing scooter a.k.a. "hoverboard" to the squad, but struggles to maneuver it around the precinct, and requires Terry's (Terry Crews) help.

It's Jake's (Andy Samberg) birthday and as such, Amy (Melissa Fumero) and him are visiting his mother, Karen (Katey Sagal) to celebrate his birthday. Amy is nervous at meeting her, to the point she has to talk about Karen's interests.

At her house, Karen reveals that Roger (Bradley Whitford) is visiting, as they have gotten back together, upsetting Jake. During the evening, Jake spends time making his father look at everything he has done. He later tells Amy that he witnessed his father having sex with one of his mother's friends years ago and never told his mother. He then tells his father he will tell his mom about the affair if he doesn't leave, which he does. However, Karen reveals she knew about the affair and says that he has changed. Jake goes after his father and convinces him to go back.

Meanwhile, Boyle (Joe Lo Truglio), Rosa (Stephanie Beatriz) and Terry participate in an operation where they have to carry body cameras on their suits to pursue a perp. However, Boyle spills soup all over his camera and leaves to change his clothes. Rosa catches the perp in a restaurant's bathroom but finds Boyle naked, all while filming with her camera. The precinct is then forced to watch the video in order to evaluate the operation. Also, Holt (Andre Braugher) tells Gina (Chelsea Peretti) they are undergoing a team-building exercise at an escape room. Due to everyone having plans, only Holt, Gina, Hitchcock (Dirk Blocker) and Scully (Joel McKinnon Miller) show up. Using their different tactics, they manage to escape the room.

== Reception ==
=== Viewers ===
In its original American broadcast, "Karen Peralta" was seen by an estimated 2.24 million household viewers and gained a 1.0/3 ratings share among adults aged 18–49, according to Nielsen Media Research. This was a 6% decrease in viewership from the previous episode, which was watched by 2.38 million viewers with a 1.0/3 in the 18-49 demographics. This means that 1.0 percent of all households with televisions watched the episode, while 3 percent of all households watching television at that time watched it. With these ratings, Brooklyn Nine-Nine was the third most watched show on FOX for the night, beating The Grinder, but behind Grandfathered and New Girl, second on its timeslot and tenth for the night, behind Grandfathered, Hollywood Game Night, a repeat of NCIS, New Girl, The Flash, Fresh Off the Boat, Chicago Med, Chicago Fire, and Super Bowl's Greatest Commercials.

=== Critical reviews ===
"Karen Peralta" received generally positive reviews from critics. Genevieve Valentine of The A.V. Club gave the episode a "B+" grade and wrote, "If Brooklyn Nine-Nine has an ongoing problem, it's that unless it's a full-ensemble episode, any episode with every character in it is going to have some flimsy subplots." Allie Pape from Vulture gave the show a 3 star rating out of 5 and wrote, "All in all, though, the plotline feels pat, and the jokes are only mediocre — I liked Amy's initial bit about how she used to get away with impressing adults by singing 'The Itsy-Bitsy Spider,' but then having her go ahead and do it not once, but twice, was pretty weak."

Andy Crump of Paste gave the episode a 8.9 rating and wrote, "There are so many stray observations worth making about Brooklyn Nine-Nine's latest installment that figuring out where to start is like ice-skating uphill. Stephanie Beatriz deserves to be cast in an action movie so she can kick asses full time; only Joe Lo Truglio can over-enunciate 'ph?' with devastating comic effect; we don't actually know Hitchcock and Scully as people, and that's mostly our own fault; Holt is forever the greatest; Amy's propensity for nerdiness is only outmatched by her willingness to take the uncomfortable social bullets for people she cares about. Put more simply, 'Karen Peralta' is a packed episode brimming with good jokes and better character development."
