= Into the Woods (Brooklyn Nine-Nine) =

- Brooklyn Nine-Nine episode
- Episode no.: Season 3 Episode 6
- Directed by: Linda Mendoza
- Written by: Andrew Guest
- Cinematography by: Giovani Lampassi
- Editing by: Sandra Montiel
- Production code: 306
- Original air date: November 8, 2015
- Running time: 22 minutes

Guest appearances
- Nick Cannon as Marcus; Matt Walsh as Lohank

Episode chronology
← Previous "Halloween III"	Next → "The Mattress"
- Brooklyn Nine-Nine season 3

"Into the Woods" is the sixth episode of the third season of the American television police sitcom series Brooklyn Nine-Nine. It is the 51st overall episode of the series and is written by Andrew Guest and directed by Linda Mendoza. It aired on Fox in the United States on November 8, 2015.

The show revolves around the fictitious 99th precinct of the New York Police Department in Brooklyn and the officers and detectives that work in the precinct. In the episode, Jake and Charles take Terry on a camping trip to help him relieve stress. Amy enlists the help of Gina in trying to convince the NYPD to purchase a product she invented as a child. Meanwhile, Holt tries to help Rosa break up with Marcus.

The episode was seen by an estimated 2.65 million household viewers and gained a 1.2/3 ratings share among adults aged 18–49, according to Nielsen Media Research. The episode received generally positive reviews from critics, who praised Beatriz's performance in the episode, Lohank's guest appearance, and the woods section.

== Plot ==
During an operation, Jake (Andy Samberg) decides to smash through a window for an arrest, which forces Terry (Terry Crews) to work on more paperwork and causes him stress. Jake and Boyle (Joe Lo Truglio) decide to bring Terry on a trip to the woods to relieve his stress. They plan to stay in a cabin owned by Detective Lohank (Matt Walsh).

Upon arriving, it turns out the cabin has polluted water and no electricity. Also, Jake has brought no food. Boyle goes out to forage for mushrooms and gets lost. Jake and Terry find Boyle in a sinkhole and while attempting to help him climb out, they also fall in. After being chided by Terry for his childish attitude requiring others to clean up after his messes, Jake then spends the night using clothes to climb out, which allows him to save the others. Despite the disastrous trip, Terry realizes that he wants to continue being "Fun Terry" and the guys set off the fireworks Jake packed in lieu of food.

Meanwhile, Rosa (Stephanie Beatriz) asks Holt (Andre Braugher) for help in breaking up with Marcus (Nick Cannon). Also meanwhile, Gina (Chelsea Peretti) helps Amy (Melissa Fumero) promote the latter's invention of a shoulder-mounted flashlight for the department, but the idea is rejected. Nevertheless, she tells Amy that they still tried and a girl in her building loves the invention.

== Reception ==
=== Viewers ===
In its original American broadcast, "Into the Woods" was seen by an estimated 2.65 million household viewers and gained a 1.2/3 ratings share among adults aged 18–49, according to Nielsen Media Research. This was a 40% decrease in viewership from the previous episode, which was watched by 4.38 million viewers with a 2.0/5 in the 18-49 demographics. This means that 1.2 percent of all households with televisions watched the episode, while 3 percent of all households watching television at that time watched it. With these ratings, Brooklyn Nine-Nine was the third most watched show on FOX for the night, beating The Last Man on Earth and Family Guy, but behind Bob's Burgers and The Simpsons, fifth on its timeslot and seventh for the night, behind Quantico, Madam Secretary, Bob's Burgers, The Simpsons, Once Upon a Time, and Sunday Night Football.

=== Critical reviews ===
"Into the Woods" received generally positive reviews from critics. Jesse Hassenger of The A.V. Club gave the episode a "B" grade and wrote, "'Into the Woods' is another enjoyable episode of a show that usually provides enjoyable episodes. But its main story, wherein Jake and Charles take Terry on a guys' camping weekend to alleviate his building stress, features a lot of shopworn bad-camping-trip material." Allie Pape from Vulture gave the show a 4 star rating out of 5 and wrote, "Tonight's installment was a little paint-by-numbers in terms of character growth and lessons learned, but it still had … character growth and lessons learned, which hasn't always been one of the show’s strong points when compared with its success at being a straight-up joke-delivery machine."

Alan Sepinwall of HitFix wrote, "The separate components of an episode like this are really good, but they somehow add up to less than the sum of the individual parts." Andy Crump of Paste gave the episode a 7.5 rating and wrote, "So 'Into the Woods' is an amazing anomaly in Brooklyn Nine-Nine's life cycle, offering up exactly what we want and need from the show as well as a few developments that are atypical to the characterizations of its ensemble."
