= 9 Days =

- Brooklyn Nine-Nine episode
- Episode no.: Season 3 Episode 12
- Directed by: Max Winkler
- Written by: Phil Augusta Jackson
- Cinematography by: Giovani Lampassi
- Editing by: Cortney Carrillo
- Production code: 311
- Original air date: January 19, 2016
- Running time: 22 minutes

Guest appearance
- Oscar Nunez as Dr. Porp

Episode chronology
← Previous "Hostage Situation"	Next → "The Cruise"
- Brooklyn Nine-Nine season 3

"9 Days" is the twelfth episode of the third season of the American television police sitcom series Brooklyn Nine-Nine. It is the 57th overall episode of the series and is written by Justin Noble and directed by Dean Holland. It aired on Fox in the United States on January 19, 2016.

The show revolves around the fictitious 99th precinct of the New York Police Department in Brooklyn and the officers and detectives that work in the precinct. In the episode, Jake and Holt are exposed to mumps while working on a case and are forced to work in Holt's house while quarantined. Meanwhile, Terry assumes leadership of the precinct, but faces some problems. Also, Rosa helps Boyle move on from his dog's death.

The episode was seen by an estimated 2.37 million household viewers and gained a 1.1/3 ratings share among adults aged 18–49, according to Nielsen Media Research. The episode received mixed reviews from critics, who praised the performances but criticized the storylines.

== Plot ==
Noting that Captain Holt (Andre Braugher) feels lonely while Kevin is in Paris on sabbatical, Jake (Andy Samberg) decides to cheer him up by suggesting they take on the cold case of a criminal that was left on his desk. Holt accepts the case.

While following someone related to the criminal, Jake and Holt are exposed to mumps and are forced to be quarantined at Holt's house to work on the case for 9 days. As time progresses, their salivary glands become inflamed. After a few days, Jake finally confesses to Holt that he brought up the case to keep Holt occupied. They fight over this for the rest of the night. Amy (Melissa Fumero) later has both of them make amends once Holt learns that Jake did it to make him feel accompanied. They ultimately discover their smoking gun through a fake recipe for baked ziti. After they heal, Holt thanks Jake for the week.

Meanwhile, due to Holt's medical leave, Terry (Terry Crews) assumes charge of the precinct. However, his leadership is jeopardized due to the stubbornness of Hitchcock (Dirk Blocker) and Scully (Joel McKinnon Miller), who refuse to work after Terry took the sandwich they were adjuring over, and the fact he destroyed Holt's office by angrily shutting the door. Later, he manages to get Hitchcock and Scully to work and fixes the office.

Meanwhile, Boyle (Joe Lo Truglio) is mourning the loss of his dog, Jason. Rosa (Stephanie Beatriz) attempts to get him to move on so they can work on a case, even going out of her way to get him a new one named Arlo, but Boyle refutes her advances and coldhearted approach. After Rosa ends up adopting Arlo, she understands how important Jason was to Boyle and organizes a proper funeral to help him grieve.

== Reception ==
=== Viewers ===
In its original American broadcast, "9 Days" was seen by an estimated 2.37 million household viewers and gained a 1.1/3 ratings share among adults aged 18–49, according to Nielsen Media Research. This was a 14% decrease in viewership from the previous episode, which was watched by 2.73 million viewers with a 1.2/4 in the 18-49 demographics. This means that 1.1 percent of all households with televisions watched the episode, while 3 percent of all households watching television at that time watched it. With these ratings, Brooklyn Nine-Nine was the second most watched show on FOX for the night, beating The Grinder and Grandfathered, but behind New Girl, third on its timeslot and ninth for the night, behind Limitless, Hollywood Game Night, The Flash, New Girl, Chicago Med, Chicago Fire, NCIS: New Orleans, and NCIS.

=== Critical reviews ===
"9 Days" received mixed reviews from critics. LaToya Ferguson of The A.V. Club gave the episode a "C−" grade and wrote, "'Nine Days,' on the other hand, isn't an episode that really does much of that at all. Here, the smaller, more intimate character moments in the episode end up mostly coming across as forced, while the only thing 'big time' really applies to, with regards to the episode, is how big and over-the-top the plots and character actions are." Conversely, Allie Pape from Vulture gave the show a perfect 5 star rating out of 5 and wrote, "It's a rarity that Brooklyn Nine-Nine can score a hat trick by balancing its hefty cast into equally compelling B- and C-plots, but this week was an exception."

Alan Sepinwall of HitFix wrote, "There are episodes of Brooklyn Nine-Nine that are erudite, sophisticated, and structurally dazzling. 'Nine Days' was not that. 'Nine Days' was about the dumbest, broadest, most lowbrow installment the show has ever given us. And also one of the funniest.”
