= Halloween III (Brooklyn Nine-Nine) =

- Brooklyn Nine-Nine episode
- Episode no.: Season 3 Episode 5
- Directed by: Michael McDonald
- Written by: David Phillips
- Cinematography by: Giovani Lampassi
- Editing by: Sandra Montiel
- Production code: 305
- Original air date: October 25, 2015
- Running time: 22 minutes

Guest appearances
- Mary Lynn Rajskub as Genevieve Mirren-Carter; Merrin Dungey as Sharon Jeffords; Josh Casaubon as Leo "Nadia" Mirren

Episode chronology
| ← Previous "The Oolong Slayer" | Next → "Into the Woods" |
- Brooklyn Nine-Nine season 3

"Halloween III" is the fifth episode of the third season of the American television police sitcom series Brooklyn Nine-Nine. It is the 50th overall episode of the series and is written by David Phillips and directed by Michael McDonald. It aired on Fox in the United States on October 25, 2015.

The show revolves around the fictitious 99th precinct of the New York Police Department in Brooklyn and the officers and detectives that work in the precinct. In the episode, the third installment of Captain Holt and Jake's Halloween heist, tied at one win apiece, becomes a tie-breaking competition to claim the title of "amazing detective/genius."

The episode was seen by an estimated 4.38 million household viewers and gained a 2.0/5 ratings share among adults aged 18–49, according to Nielsen Media Research. The episode received critical acclaim from critics, who praised Fumero's performance in the episode, with many naming it as one of the best episodes of the show.

== Plot ==
In the cold open, Charles decides to not dress up for Halloween this year since the rest of the squad makes fun of his costumes, only to find the rest of his coworkers dressed up. When he returns in an Elvis Presley costume, the squad then appear in their normal work attire and taunt him.

Continuing their annual tradition, Jake (Andy Samberg) and Holt (Andre Braugher) set out to prove who the "amazing detective/genius" is. This time they must steal the title's crown, which is locked in a suitcase in the interrogation room, but they will work in teams.

Holt selects Terry (Terry Crews) and Gina, (Chelsea Peretti) while Jake selects Boyle (Joe Lo Truglio) and Rosa (Stephanie Beatriz). Amy (Melissa Fumero) is left out of the competition because both sides suspect she might betray them and spy for the other (as she is both Jake's girlfriend and Holt's mentee). Jake and Boyle distract Gina, while Rosa manages to steal the crown and put it in a vault by Jake's desk. However, Holt monitors Jake and uses Terry's wife (Merrin Dungey) to distract him while he steals the crown. Holt throws the crown into a trash can to distract Jake and it goes missing. Meanwhile, Boyle introduces Gina to a friend of his named Nadia, (Josh Casaubon) but Gina believes this is part of Boyle's plan to steal the crown and she rejects Nadia. Upon learning of the veracity, she pursues Nadia. However, she is horrified to learn that Nadia, whose real name is Leo, is actually Charles' girlfriend Genevieve's twin brother.

Learning that a janitor took the crown from the trash can, Jake and Holt (as well as their teams) run to the janitor's apartment building. They have to run up many floors, as the elevator does not work. They finally reach the janitor on the rooftop, only to discover it was Amy all along. She explains that she orchestrated the events in order to retrieve the crown in retaliation for being left out of the competition. Amy is subsequently crowned in the bar with the title.

== Reception ==
=== Viewers ===
In its original American broadcast, "Halloween III" was seen by an estimated 4.38 million household viewers and gained a 2.0/5 ratings share among adults aged 18–49, according to Nielsen Media Research. This was a 70% increase in viewership from the previous episode, which was watched by 2.57 million viewers with a 1.2/3 in the 18-49 demographics. This means that 2.0 percent of all households with televisions watched the episode, while 5 percent of all households watching television at that time watched it. With these ratings, Brooklyn Nine-Nine was the second most watched show on FOX for the night, beating The Last Man on Earth and Family Guy, but behind The Simpsons, third on its timeslot and third for the night, behind The Simpsons, and Sunday Night Football.

=== Critical reviews ===
"Halloween III" received critical acclaim from critics. LaToya Ferguson of The A.V. Club gave the episode an "A" grade and wrote, "Sure, like last season's Halloween episode, the end result of 'Halloween, Part III' is pretty obvious. That's merely a symptom of knowing the Halloween episode structure thanks to the first one. But like with any sitcom — or television show in general — it's perfectly alright to be obvious and predictable, as long as it's well-executed. 'Halloween, Part III' is absolutely well-executed." Allie Pape from Vulture gave the show a perfect 5 star rating out of 5 and wrote, "Though Peralta and Holt are much more buddy-buddy than when the tradition started, the rivalry is still intense."

Alan Sepinwall of HitFix wrote, "In all cases, the spirit of competition forces people to act out of character and/or to be crazier than normal. As a weekly thing, it would get tired, but once a year? It's an absolute treat." Andy Crump of Paste gave the episode a 9.2 rating and wrote, "And when you roll every aspect of 'Halloween III' together, you wind up with a joyfully hilarious half hour of television that ends by coronating one of its underappreciated female leads. Maybe her lip reading could use some work, but that's about it. She can sleuth and spoof with the best of them, and even if we're just talking about a holiday lark episode, it's about time Brooklyn Nine-Nine reminded us of her invaluability."

== See also ==
- Halloween (Brooklyn Nine-Nine)
- Halloween II (Brooklyn Nine-Nine)
- Halloween IV (Brooklyn Nine-Nine)
