= Brooklyn Nine-Nine season 3 =

Brooklyn Nine-Nine
- Season 3
- DVD cover
- Starring: Andy Samberg; Stephanie Beatriz; Terry Crews; Melissa Fumero; Joe Lo Truglio; Chelsea Peretti; Andre Braugher; Dirk Blocker; Joel McKinnon Miller
- No. of episodes: 23

Release
- Original network: Fox
- Original release: September 27, 2015 – April 19, 2016

Season chronology
- ← Previous; Season 2 Next → Season 4

The third season of the television sitcom Brooklyn Nine-Nine premiered September 27, 2015 on Fox and ended April 19, 2016 with 23 episodes.

== Summary ==
Following the kiss that Jake and Amy had, the two decide to pursue a real relationship. The Nine-Nine gets a new captain, Seth Dozerman (Bill Hader) who dies of a heart attack after seeing Jake and Amy kissing. The Vulture assumes command of the precinct, but Holt retakes it thanks to Jake after the two of them catch a serial killer. Charles begins a relationship with Genevieve, an art curator who was framed for insurance fraud. Terry's wife gives birth to their third daughter, Ava, on Thanksgiving.

Rosa breaks up with Marcus and begins a new relationship with Adrian Pimento, a detective who's been undercover for 12 years. Rosa and Adrian get engaged, but Adrian is forced to go into hiding when Jimmy "The Butcher" Figgis tries to have him killed by someone tied to the FBI. Amy goes undercover in a women's prison in Texas to find out which FBI informant is tied to Figgis and discovers it was Holt's former partner that they were working the case with, Bob Annderson. They capture Bob and use his knowledge to take down most of Figgis' empire. Jake receives a call from Figgis threatening his and Holt's lives, forcing the two to go to witness protection in Florida.

== Cast ==
=== Main ===
- Andy Samberg as Detective Jake Peralta
- Stephanie Beatriz as Detective Rosa Diaz
- Terry Crews as Sergeant Terry Jeffords
- Melissa Fumero as Detective Amy Santiago
- Joe Lo Truglio as Detective Charles Boyle
- Chelsea Peretti as Gina Linetti
- Andre Braugher as Captain Raymond Holt

=== Starring ===
- Dirk Blocker as Detective Michael Hitchcock
- Joel McKinnon Miller as Detective Norm Scully

=== Recurring ===
- Dean Winters as Keith "The Vulture" Pembroke
- Kyra Sedgwick as Deputy Chief Madelyn Wuntch
- Jason Mantzoukas as Adrian Pimento

=== Guest ===
- Bill Hader as Captain Seth Dozerman
- Archie Panjabi as Lieutenant Singh
- Neil deGrasse Tyson as himself
- Mary Lynn Rajskub as Genevieve
- Nick Offerman as Frederick
- Nick Cannon as Marcus
- Kathryn Hahn as Eleanor
- Craig Robinson as Doug Judy
- Bradley Whitford as Captain Roger Peralta
- Katey Sagal as Karen Peralta
- Damon Wayans Jr. as Detective Stevie Schillens
- Aida Turturro as Maura Figgis
- Dennis Haysbert as Bob Annderson
- Anders Holm as Soren Knausgaard
- Riki Lindhome as Agneta Carlsson

== Episodes ==
Season 3 episodes
No. overall	No. in season	Title	Directed by	Written by	Original release date	Prod. code	U.S. viewers (millions)
46	1	"New Captain"	Michael Schur	Matt Murray	September 27, 2015	301	3.14
Efficiency-obsessed Cpt. Seth Dozerman arrives as the new captain. Jake and Amy explore the repercussions of revealing their feelings at the end of the previous season. Due to his genetic heart condition, Captain Dozerman suffers a heart attack after seeing Amy and Jake kiss in the Evidence Room and he dies. Cpt. Holt & Gina start work at the PR dept and get forced into trivial matters by Chief Wuntch. Vulture is instated as Captain replacing Dozerman at the Nine-Nine.
47	2	"The Funeral"	Claire Scanlon	Luke Del Tredici	October 4, 2015	302	4.10
The Vulture becomes the new captain of the precinct after Dozerman's death and threatens to jeopardize Jake and Amy's nascent romance. Meanwhile, Terry helps Holt with a PR problem; and Rosa and Gina urge Charles to abandon his crush on a colleague.
48	3	"Boyle's Hunch"	Trent O'Donnell	Tricia McAlpin	October 11, 2015	304	2.75
Jake thinks Boyle might have met his soul-mate in Genevieve, an art gallery owner, and he tries to help set them up. Meanwhile, Rosa deals with intra-precinct theft and Holt seeks Amy's help with an image campaign.
49	4	"The Oolong Slayer"	Michael McDonald	Gabe Liedman	October 18, 2015	303	2.57
While investigating a serial killer, Jake enlists Holt's help in an attempt to solve the case off the radar. At the precinct, Rosa and Amy are forced to plan the Vulture's birthday party and Charles tries to help Terry with his new-found addiction. After Jake and Holt successfully bring down the Oolong Slayer, Jake gives the credit away to help Holt regain his position as captain of the precinct.
50	5	"Halloween III"	Michael McDonald	David Phillips	October 25, 2015	305	4.38
The third installment of Captain Holt and Jake's Halloween heist, tied at one win apiece, enters a tie-breaking competition to claim the title of "amazing detective/genius." This year, Jake and Holt split the squad into two teams to help them win, both of them excluding Amy. Amy proves who the most "amazing detective/genius" really is by winning the heist.
51	6	"Into the Woods"	Linda Mendoza	Andrew Guest	November 8, 2015	306	2.65
Jake and Charles take Terry on a camping trip to help him relieve stress. Amy enlists the help of Gina in trying to convince the NYPD to purchase a product she invented as a child. Meanwhile, Holt tries to help Rosa break up with Marcus.
52	7	"The Mattress"	Dean Holland	Laura McCreary	November 15, 2015	307	2.69
Amy blames Jake's old mattress for her back pain, and Jake is too cheap to buy a new one. After they convince Holt they can still work together while being in a relationship, the topic of the mattress causes them to have a lovers' spat in the middle of their next assigned case. Elsewhere, Charles scratches a classic sports car that Holt has identified as a precious family heirloom, while Rosa deals with a teenage boy she once helped straighten out when he returns to the precinct after a repeat offense.
53	8	"Ava"	Tristram Shapeero	Matt O'Brien	November 22, 2015	308	3.88
With Terry off solving a murder case, Jake offers to watch over Sharon, Terry's pregnant wife. He panics when her water breaks, and attempts to solve the problem without going to the hospital, under her request. It doesn't help him when the precinct is in a ruckus due to the internet going down.
54	9	"The Swedes"	Eric Appel	Matt Murray	December 6, 2015	309	3.95
Jake and Rosa compete with a pair of Swedish detectives, Soren & Agneta, on a jewelry theft case, causing them to re-examine their relationship as partners. Holt asks Charles to be his partner in a squash championship when Kevin is out of town, but Charles fears his extreme competitiveness will surface. Meanwhile, Amy and Terry try to help Gina study for her Astronomy test, with Terry even bringing in a friend from his gym, Neil deGrasse Tyson, to help.
55	10	"Yippie Kayak"	Rebecca Asher	Lakshmi Sundaram	December 13, 2015	310	3.82
Under the ruse of buying a gift for Amy (which is really a gift for Boyle), Jake gets trapped in a store with Boyle and Gina after it closes, and finds there is a robbery being committed by a team of thugs who take employees as hostages. This gives Jake a chance to play out a real-life version of the movie Die Hard. Terry is forced to deal with the Vulture to ensure that the hostage situation is handled properly. Meanwhile, Amy attempts to join Holt and Rosa in a Polar Club swim.
56	11	"Hostage Situation"	Max Winkler	Phil Augusta Jackson	January 5, 2016	312	2.73
Wanting children, Boyle has to obtain his sperm from a sperm bank, but his ex-wife Eleanor holds the samples hostage as she needs Boyle and Peralta to get her out of a lawsuit. Meanwhile, Holt and Diaz have to rely on Gina to get a suspect to talk, and Santiago needs Jeffords' recommendation for a mentorship program but she accidentally breaks his nose.
57	12	"9 Days"	Dean Holland	Justin Noble	January 19, 2016	311	2.37
When Captain Holt and Jake accidentally contract the mumps during an investigation, they decide to be quarantined together in hopes of still solving the case. Meanwhile, Rosa tries to help Boyle through a mourning process, and Terry is forced to clean up Hitchcock and Scully’s mess.
58	13	"The Cruise"	Michael Spiller	Tricia McAlpin	January 26, 2016	313	2.38
Jake and Amy have differing ideas about how they will spend time on their vacation cruise, but their plans are disrupted when they see that Doug Judy (The Pontiac Bandit) is the ship's musical entertainer. Jake wants to seize the chance to finally take down his nemesis, but Judy convinces Jake and Amy to protect him from an assassin that is on the ship. At the precinct, Holt tries to avoid his visiting "drama queen" sister, Debbie, while Rosa and Charles take turns trying to schmooze a landlord who had an elderly tenant die in his building, as they both want the old lady's apartment.
59	14	"Karen Peralta"	Bruce McCulloch	Alison Agosti & Gabe Liedman	February 2, 2016	314	2.24
Amy is nervous about meeting Jake's mother, Karen, for the first time. Her issues become secondary when the two arrive at the house, as Jake learns that his mother and his estranged father, Roger, have gotten back together. Rosa and Charles work a drug bust wearing chest-mounted cameras for the first time, but it leads to embarrassing results for Charles. Meanwhile, Holt has scheduled a team-building exercise at an escape room, but Gina forgot to forward the invitations to the staff. This leads to Holt, Gina, Scully and Hitchcock being the only people to show up for the event.
60	15	"The 9-8"	Nisha Ganatra	David Phillips	February 9, 2016	315	2.28
Holt and Jeffords try to keep things together when a plumbing emergency forces the Nine-Eight staff to temporarily take up residence in the Nine-Nine precinct. The incident reunites Jake with Steve, his old pal and former partner from their beat cop days, causing Charles to become jealous when he sees the two hit it off.
61	16	"House Mouses"	Claire Scanlon	Andrew Guest	February 16, 2016	316	2.18
Jake offers his drug case to Scully and Hitchcock because he wants to work on a case with Charles that Holt says involves a celebrity. But the drug bust turns out to be the much bigger case, while Holt's "celebrity" is a concert oboeist that few people would know. Meanwhile, Amy and Gina learn that Rosa never attends blood drives because she is afraid of needles, so the three women resolve to help each other conquer their greatest fears.
62	17	"Adrian Pimento"	Maggie Carey	Luke Del Tredici	February 23, 2016	317	2.13
Detective Adrian Pimento returns to the Nine-Nine after being undercover with notorious mob boss Jimmy "The Butcher" Figgis, for 12 years. Despite Pimento exhibiting PTSD-like symptoms, Jake is fascinated and badly wants to work a case with him. Meanwhile, Holt asks Gina to produce a video about the daily workings inside the precinct, while the other detectives deal with a growing garbage issue after Charles ticks off the head of custodians, known as Mean Marge.
63	18	"Cheddar"	Alex Reid	Jessica Polonsky	March 1, 2016	318	1.85
Jake and Amy encourage Holt to follow through on his plans to visit Kevin in Paris, because Holt has been noticeably lonely. They offer to house-sit, but their stay is filled with disasters, including Kevin's dog Cheddar running away. Meanwhile, Rosa and Pimento tiptoe around their mutual attraction for one another.
64	19	"Terry Kitties"	Michael McDonald	Phil Augusta Jackson & Tricia McAlpin	March 15, 2016	319	1.95
Terry tackles an old case with Jake's help to prove his mettle to his old precinct. Meanwhile, Adrian becomes Charles' new roommate; and Amy goes along on a difficult training exercise with Holt and Rosa.
65	20	"Paranoia"	Payman Benz	Gabe Liedman	March 29, 2016	320	2.02
Rosa and Adrian announce they are getting married...in one week. Rosa's co-maids of honor Amy, Gina and Charles compete to throw her the best bachelorette party. Jake rents a party bus for Adrian's bachelor party with Scully, Hitchcock and a reluctant Terry also participating. Adrian's party goes awry when he claims someone hired by Jimmy Figgis is trying to kill him. It turns out to be true, and the guys fake Adrian's death. The masked man who pays off for the hit is then tailed by the guys, who observe him walking into an FBI building. Adrian goes into hiding, and the Nine-Nine swear to bring down Figgis and his FBI informant.
66	21	"Maximum Security"	Victor Nelli, Jr.	Laura McCreary	April 5, 2016	321	2.71
The squad fakes Pimento's death and holds a funeral in order to trick the mob's FBI informant. Diaz, disguised as pregnant, must go undercover in a women's prison in Texas to try to get close to Jimmy Figgis' murderous sister Maura, with Jake and Charles posing as her OBGYN doctors. However, Diaz's cover is immediately blown and Amy must take over.
67	22	"Bureau"	Ryan Case	David Phillips & Alison Agosti	April 12, 2016	322	2.07
After positively identifying the mob informant within the FBI, Holt, Jake and Rosa make plans to infiltrate FBI headquarters to get the man's files, with Holt bringing in his former partner Bob Annderson for assistance. After successfully getting the needed files out of the FBI building, the group finds the informant has been shot and is near death. Jake leaves Holt and Annderson at the hospital with the comatose informant, only to have Amy relay critical information she got from Maura Figgis in prison: that he was also working with a man named "Bob Annderson".
68	23	"Greg and Larry"	Dan Goor	Andrew Guest & Phil Augusta Jackson	April 19, 2016	323	2.02
FBI Agent turned traitor Bob Annderson steals the FBI files, murders the informant and takes Captain Holt hostage on the roof of the hospital, but the squad are able to rescue the captain and capture Annderson. The squad hold Annderson in Diaz's apartment while Boyle and Amy rush back from Texas. Eventually the squad trick Annderson into revealing the location of the FBI files, which he had hidden in a safety deposit box. With those files, the Nine-Nine are able to take down Figgis' operation although Figgis himself remains at large. However, while the squad celebrates, Figgis calls Jake's cellphone to threaten his and Holt's lives. The final scene shows Jake and Holt in witness protection, living next door to each other in Coral Palms, Florida, under the names "Greg" (Holt) and "Larry" (Jake).

== Reception ==
=== Critical response ===
The third season received positive reviews to critical acclaim, although a few audiences found it inferior to the second season. Review aggregator website Rotten Tomatoes reports a 93% approval rating, with an average score of 8.19/10, based on 14 reviews. The website's consensus reads, "Brooklyn Nine-Nine's third season smartly sidesteps the pitfalls of romantically linking two central characters while also expounding on the series' joy for clever gags and hard-earned camaraderie."

=== Awards and nominations ===
Award	Date of ceremony	Category	Recipients and nominees	Result
People's Choice Awards	January 6, 2016	Favorite Comedic TV Actor	Andy Samberg	Nominated
Critics' Choice Television Awards	January 17, 2016	Best Supporting Actor in a Comedy Series	Andre Braugher	Won
NAACP Image Award	February 5, 2016	Outstanding Actor in a Comedy Series	Andre Braugher	Nominated
NAACP Image Award	February 5, 2016	Outstanding Supporting Actor in a Comedy Series	Terry Crews	Nominated
Satellite Awards	February 21, 2016	Best Television Series, Comedy or Musical	Brooklyn Nine-Nine	Won
GLAAD Media Awards	April 2, 2016	Outstanding Comedy Series	Brooklyn Nine-Nine	Nominated
Teen Choice Awards	July 31, 2016	Choice TV Actor: Comedy	Andy Samberg	Won
Imagen Awards	September 9, 2016	Best Supporting Actress – Television	Melissa Fumero	Nominated
Imagen Awards	September 9, 2016	Best Supporting Actress – Television	Stephanie Beatriz	Nominated
Imagen Awards	September 9, 2016	Best Primetime Television Program – Comedy	Brooklyn Nine-Nine	Won
Creative Arts Emmy Awards	September 10, 2016	Outstanding Stunt Coordination for a Comedy Series or Variety Program	Brooklyn Nine-Nine	Nominated
Poppy Awards	September 13, 2016	Outstanding Lead Actor in a Comedy Series	Andy Samberg	Won
68th Primetime Emmy Awards	September 18, 2016	Outstanding Supporting Actor in a Comedy Series	Andre Braugher	Nominated
