= The Cruise (Brooklyn Nine-Nine) =

- Brooklyn Nine-Nine episode
- Episode no.: Season 3 Episode 13
- Directed by: Michael Spiller
- Written by: Tricia McAlpin
- Cinematography by: Giovani Lampassi
- Editing by: Cortney Carrillo
- Production code: 313
- Original air date: January 26, 2016
- Running time: 22 minutes

Guest appearances
- Craig Robinson as Doug Judy; Paul F. Tompkins as Captain Orleans; Niecy Nash as Debbie Holt

Episode chronology
← Previous "9 Days"	Next → "Karen Peralta"
- Brooklyn Nine-Nine season 3

"The Cruise" is the thirteenth episode of the third season of the American television police sitcom series Brooklyn Nine-Nine. It is the 58th overall episode of the series and is written by Tricia McAlpin and directed by Michael Spiller. It aired on Fox in the United States on January 26, 2016.

The show revolves around the fictitious 99th precinct of the New York Police Department in Brooklyn and the officers and detectives that work in the precinct. In the episode, Jake and Amy spend a week on a cruise, only to discover that Doug Judy is the musical entertainer, hiding from an assassin. Meanwhile, Boyle and Rosa compete for a vacant apartment after the owner dies. Also, Holt's sister visits him, much to his dismay.

The episode was seen by an estimated 2.38 million household viewers and gained a 1.0/3 ratings share among adults aged 18–49, according to Nielsen Media Research. The episode received positive reviews from critics, who praised Robinson's and Nash's guest performances.

== Plot ==
Jake (Andy Samberg) wins tickets for a week on a cruise and decides to take Amy (Melissa Fumero). While on the ship, they discuss the fact that Amy enrolled them on nearly all of the cruise's activities. To their shock, they find out that Doug Judy (Craig Robinson) is the cruise's music entertainer.

Due to being within international waters, they can't arrest Judy and the Captain also refuses to arrest him. Judy tells Jake that he got him the tickets, as he's being pursued by a hitman of one of his former bosses. After doubting Judy, they find him getting attacked by an assassin, who manages to escape. They decide to bait the hitman by having Judy perform in the cruise. The hitman takes Judy, but Jake and Amy manage to catch him. However, Judy escapes on a boat, leaving his cabin to Jake and Amy.

Meanwhile, Boyle (Joe Lo Truglio) and Rosa (Stephanie Beatriz) investigate the murder of an elderly woman, but are stunned by the vacant apartment. They try to compete for the apartment, but the landlord (Ruben Garfias) states that the apartment has already been sold. Later, they find evidence that the landlord is responsible for the murder and arrest him. Also, Holt (Andre Braugher) is unhappy, as his sister Debbie (Niecy Nash) is visiting with him. Deeming her a "drama queen", Holt tries to make her leave the precinct. However, upon realizing that she came in after her partner cheated on her, Holt decides to spend time with her.

== Reception ==
=== Viewers ===
In its original American broadcast, "The Cruise" was seen by an estimated 2.38 million household viewers and gained a 1.0/3 ratings share among adults aged 18–49, according to Nielsen Media Research. This was a slight increase in viewership from the previous episode, which was watched by 2.37 million viewers with a 1.1/3 in the 18-49 demographics. This means that 1.0 percent of all households with televisions watched the episode, while 3 percent of all households watching television at that time watched it. With these ratings, Brooklyn Nine-Nine was the second most watched show on FOX for the night, beating The Grinder and Grandfathered, but behind New Girl, third on its timeslot and eight for the night, behind New Girl, Hollywood Game Night, a repeat of NCIS: New Orleans, The Flash, a repeat of NCIS, Chicago Med, and Chicago Fire.

=== Critical reviews ===
"The Cruise" received positive reviews from critics. LaToya Ferguson of The A.V. Club gave the episode a "B+" grade and wrote, "'The Cruise' is a good episode as a whole, but it's also one that feels at times like it's trying to rekindle the magic of the superior, previous two installments of the trilogy." Allie Pape from Vulture gave the show a 4 star rating out of 5 and wrote, "This third installment moves the setting to a cruise ship. Unfortunately, that shorts out some of the tension of the first two Pontiac Bandit installments, since it's pretty much immediately clear that Jake has no hope of capturing Judy in international waters."

Alan Sepinwall of HitFix wrote, "While 'The Cruise' didn't offer the deliriously stupid heights of Jake and Holt's misadventures with the mumps from last week, it was one of the season's most well-balanced episodes, with something to offer from all three storylines, the welcome return of Craig Robinson as Jake's arch-nemesis Doug Judy, and the promising introduction of Niecy Nash as Debbie, Holt's temperamental opposite of a sister." Andy Crump of Paste gave the episode a 8.6 rating and wrote, "Maybe this is why the sameness of the plot threads is irrelevant. Brooklyn Nine-Nine knows how to take tired material and liven it up with authenticity, whether emotional or comical. If you don't chuckle at Holt's shadowy seltzer habits, or feel your heart melt in his climactic moment with Debbie, you're more of a robot than he is."
