= Halloween (Brooklyn Nine-Nine) =

- Brooklyn Nine-Nine episode
- Episode no.: Season 1 Episode 6
- Directed by: Dean Holland
- Written by: Lesley Arfin
- Cinematography by: Giovani Lampassi
- Editing by: Cortney Carrillo
- Production code: 107
- Original air date: October 22, 2013
- Running time: 22 minutes

Guest appearances
- Dirk Blocker as Michael Hitchcock; Joel McKinnon Miller as Norm Scully; John Ross Bowie as Sister Steve

Episode chronology
← Previous "The Vulture"	Next → "48 Hours"
- Brooklyn Nine-Nine season 1

"Halloween" is the sixth episode of the first season of the American television police sitcom series Brooklyn Nine-Nine. It is the 6th overall episode of the series and is written by Lesley Arfin and directed by Dean Holland. It aired on Fox in the United States on October 22, 2013. It was the sixth episode to be broadcast but the seventh episode to be produced.

In this episode, Amy and Boyle are assigned to assist in a drug case during Halloween, much to Amy's dismay as she hates the holiday. Jake and Holt hold a competition to see if Jake can steal Holt's Medal of Valor before midnight without being caught. Terry sets out to discover why Rosa left Catholic school. The episode was seen by an estimated 3.77 million household viewers and gained a 1.5/4 ratings share among adults aged 18–49, according to Nielsen Media Research. The episode received mostly positive reviews from critics, who praised the episode's plot execution and Samberg's and Braugher's performances.

This marks the first of the annual "Halloween Heist" episodes of the series.

== Plot ==
It is Halloween, but Amy Santiago (Melissa Fumero) is the only one who despises it, citing the low standard everyone makes of it. While talking to the gang, Jake Peralta (Andy Samberg) brags that no one would catch him if he were a criminal. Raymond Holt (Andre Braugher) overhears and tells him he would catch him easily. They then decide to make a bet: Peralta will need to rob Holt's Medal of Valor by midnight. If Peralta wins, Holt will need to do Peralta's paperwork and call him his greatest detective; if Holt wins, Peralta will have to work five weekends with no extra salary.

Terry Jeffords (Terry Crews) finds out that Rosa Diaz (Stephanie Beatriz) went to Catholic school until she dropped out and sets out to find why she left. Meanwhile, Santiago and Charles Boyle (Joe Lo Truglio) are assigned with a case to bust a drug deal at a Halloween party, which involves costumes, to Santiago's dismay. Boyle, dressed as Mario Batali, tries to show Santiago the fun parts of Halloween, but she gets stuck with a used skeleton costume and keeps running into disgusting scenarios on the case. Due to Santiago's insecurity with her costume, she pays Michael Hitchcock (Dirk Blocker) to replace her. Peralta uses many schemes to try to get into Holt's office, where the medal is secured in a locked safe that can only be accessed with a key and code that only Holt knows, but encounters problems such as falling through a ceiling and failing to replicate the key.

Jeffords contacts the Catholic school and finds out that Diaz was a good student, but left voluntarily to enter a ballet academy. He decides not to tell anyone about it. Holt is sent to the interrogation room after Peralta is arrested for trying to climb the building with a blowtorch. However, Peralta reveals his plan to Holt: without Holt knowing, Peralta convinced everyone to help him in exchange for doing their paperwork; he then secretly used Diaz to open the cabinet, Jeffords and Santiago to open the office's window, and Jeffords and Boyle to copy Holt's fingerprints on the phone with plastic paper and use it to open the safe. Peralta ends up winning the bet and Holt begins working on the paperwork. Santiago has the rest of the squad dress up in costumes and apologizes to Boyle for her attitude throughout the night. The episode ends as Diaz attacks an escapee inmate, telling Jeffords that she left the ballet school for beating up classmates.

== Reception ==
=== Viewers ===
In its original American broadcast, "Halloween" was seen by an estimated 3.77 million household viewers and gained a 1.6/4 ratings share among adults aged 18–49, according to Nielsen Media Research. This was a slight increase in viewership from the previous episode, which was watched by 3.43 million viewers with a 1.5/4 in the 18-49 demographics. This means that 1.6 percent of all households with televisions watched the episode, while 4 percent of all households watching television at that time watched it. With these ratings, Brooklyn Nine-Nine was the second most watched show on FOX for the night, beating Dads and The Mindy Project but behind New Girl, fourth on its timeslot and ninth for the night in the 18-49 demographics, behind The Goldbergs, New Girl, The Biggest Loser, Chicago Fire, Person of Interest, NCIS: Los Angeles, Agents of S.H.I.E.L.D., and NCIS.

=== Critical reviews ===
"Halloween" received mostly positive reviews from critics. Roth Cornet of IGN gave the episode a "great" 8.0 out of 10 and wrote, "There are those who don't care for holiday-themed episodes of television, but I've always had a fondness for them. There are certain standard storylines that are utilized, sure, but there are certain behaviors that we see repeated in our lives around the holidays: over-enthusiasm, under-enthusiasm, and all around grinchyness to name a few. In that way it feels as though the TV tropes are fairly in sync with the world and regular holiday happenings. A character's response to the festivities will often reveal things about them that other circumstances may not."

Molly Eichel of The A.V. Club gave the episode an "A−" grade and wrote, "'Halloween' is a holiday-themed episode, which ostensibly dooms it to cliche from the start. Then other layers of overdone are packed into the plot: distaste for a holiday that leads to learning the lesson of said holiday, the co-worker with a secret, challenges accepted. But 'Halloween' all worked in a way that on paper it really shouldn't have, in part because the main plot could have happened during any episode, holiday-themed or not. It was augmented by the Halloween backdrop, but it certainly wasn't dependent on it."

== See also ==
- Halloween II (Brooklyn Nine-Nine)
- Halloween III (Brooklyn Nine-Nine)
- Halloween IV (Brooklyn Nine-Nine)
