= The Jimmy Jab Games =

- Brooklyn Nine-Nine episode
- Episode no.: Season 2 Episode 3
- Directed by: Rebecca Asher
- Written by: Lakshmi Sundaram
- Cinematography by: Giovani Lampassi
- Editing by: Sandra Montiel
- Production code: 203
- Original air date: October 12, 2014
- Running time: 22 minutes

Guest appearances
- Kyra Sedgwick as Madeline Wuntch

Episode chronology
← Previous "Chocolate Milk"	Next → "Halloween II"
- Brooklyn Nine-Nine season 2

"The Jimmy Jab Games" is the third episode of the second season of the American television police sitcom series Brooklyn Nine-Nine. The topic of the episode is the fictional game of the same name. It is the 25th overall episode of the series and is written by Lakshmi Sundaram and directed by Rebecca Asher. It aired on Fox in the United States on October 12, 2014.

The show revolves around the fictitious 99th precinct of the New York Police Department in Brooklyn and the officers and detectives that work in the precinct. Jake Peralta (Andy Samberg) is an immature yet very talented detective in the precinct with an astounding record of crimes solved, putting him in a competition with fellow detective Amy Santiago (Melissa Fumero). The precinct's status changes when the Captain is retiring and a new commanding officer, Cpt. Raymond Holt (Andre Braugher) is appointed as the newest Captain. This creates a conflict between Jake and Holt over their respective methods in the field. In the episode, Holt and Terry go off to a meeting at One Police Plaza. Meanwhile, the gang decides to assemble their annual "Jimmy Jab Games," with Jake wanting the number of Rosa's friend if he wins. In addition, Boyle and Gina discover that Hitchcock possesses a tape that reveals their relationship. The pair sets out to take it from him.

The episode was seen by an estimated 4.51 million household viewers and gained a 2.2/6 ratings share among adults aged 18–49, according to Nielsen Media Research. The episode received mostly positive reviews from critics, who praised the episode's similitude to Office Olympics from The Office and Andy Samberg's performance.

== Plot ==
Holt and Terry (Terry Crews) are assigned to a meeting at 1 Police Plaza. The precinct is left on their own for a few hours before they are assigned to defend the President of Serbia's motorcade. The gang then decides to do the "Jimmy Jab Games". The competition's name comes from Jake's mispronunciation of Mahmoud Ahmadinejad (Armen Jimmy Jab), who Jake also believed was the "King of Iraq" rather than President of Iran. Jake makes a bet with Rosa (Stephanie Beatriz): if he wins, he gets Rosa's friend's phone number (which she had refused to give to him earlier); if he loses, he will pay $200 to Rosa and never ask for any more phone numbers.

In the first game, the participants must eat expired Chinese food. Boyle is the first one eliminated, while Scully (Joel McKinnon Miller), the winner, leaves due to food poisoning. The second game, a foot race in anti-bomb suits, ends with Hitchcock (Dirk Blocker) eliminated. The next task involves Jake, Rosa, and Amy going undercover before anyone recognizes them. Amy seems to have lost, but Rosa fails to convince a single person, so she is eliminated. However, Rosa asks Jake if he'd like to cancel the bet, as it's clear he's still in love with Amy. Jake rebuffs this. The final task involves them running through the precinct to complete various activities. Jake gets stuck in the final activity, giving Amy the victory. Her victory is interrupted by Holt's and Terry's return, with Holt ordering them to stop. Jake later reveals to Rosa that he purposely let Amy win. Rosa then decides to give him her friend's number, hoping to help him move on from Amy.

While away from the office, Holt faces off with his nemesis, Deputy Chief Wuntch (Kyra Sedgwick). He wants $1200 for new kits that can help combat a new, more potent form of ecstasy. Wuntch tricks Holt into asking for and accepting a high budget. The budget includes a drug task force that will end up in a loss if the operation goes awry. However, Terry convinces Holt that the task force can succeed and to put Rosa in charge of it. Meanwhile, Gina (Chelsea Peretti) orders Boyle to snare a tape that reveals their relationship from an oblivious, but ultimately vindictive Hitchcock. After fighting with Hitchcock, Boyle gets the tape and destroys it.

== Reception ==
=== Viewers ===
In its original American broadcast, "The Jimmy Jab Games" was seen by an estimated 4.51 million household viewers and gained a 2.2/6 ratings share among adults aged 18–49, according to Nielsen Media Research. This was a 36% increase in viewership from the previous episode, which was watched by 3.31 million viewers with a 1.6/4 in the 18-49 demographics. This means that 2.2 percent of all households with televisions watched the episode, while 6 percent of all households watching television at that time watched it. With these ratings, Brooklyn Nine-Nine was the third most watched show on FOX for the night, beating Mulaney and Family Guy but behind The Simpsons, fifth on its timeslot and fifth for the night, behind Once Upon a Time, The Simpsons, The OT, and NBC Sunday Night Football.

=== Critical reviews ===
"The Jimmy Jab Games" received mostly positive reviews from critics. LaToya Ferguson of The A.V. Club gave the episode an "A−" grade and wrote, "'The Jimmy Jab Games' isn't a revolutionary episode of television. But it is consistently funny, and sometimes it's important to remember that 'funny' is the true end goal of sitcoms. (It has something to do with what the 'com' in sitcom means, I think.) Even with the Peralta/Amy situation in full effect, it never actually slows down the episode as much as it draws attention to the show's possible flaw. It does allow for more Peralta/Diaz interaction, which has always been welcome, especially in a post 'Pontiac Bandit' world."

Jackson McHenry of Entertainment Weekly wrote, "'The Jimmy Jab Games' manages to grow out of The Office's shadow by letting its characters be self-aware in a way that the employee’s of Dunder-Mifflin never were. Jim and Pam were both afraid to tell anyone about their feelings, but Jake and Amy discuss theirs openly, with their friends and each other. By the end of this episode, Jake knows what he wants, but he also knows what is the more grown-up thing to do. Brooklyn Nine-Nine's less about realizing what's right there in front of you, and more about learning that no matter how much you want them, some things are out of your control." Allie Pape from Vulture gave the show a 3 star rating out of 5 and wrote, "Some of my favorite B99 episodes so far have been the ones without any crimes involved ('The Party,' 'Tactical Village'), just letting the cast play with each other. This is how you get Peralta lighting a bagel on fire as Scully, attired in a Viking hat and carrying a hockey stick, sings opera. Every episode of this show could consist of new Jimmy Jab events, and I probably wouldn’t get bored."

Alan Sepinwall of HitFix wrote, "'Jimmy Jab Games' is a pretty straight lift of the plot of 'Office Olympics' from The Office season 2, but I’m okay with that for a few reason. First, Mike Schur wrote 'Office Olympics,' so if he wants his writers here to import the nine-year-old idea into the Brooklyn Nine-Nine universe, more power to him. Second, this episode expanded on the idea by incorporating more of what we know about the ensemble and their gifts (like Scully's opera singing) and by acknowledging all the weird toys a bored detective squad would have to play with." Andy Crump of Paste gave the episode a 7.1 and wrote, "Fortunately, 'The Jimmy Jab Games' finds plenty of opportunity to make up for its cathartic lapses with hijinks. It is amazing that anybody manages to get anything done in the 99th, but that's nothing new to us; slightly less familiar is the notion of stakes, at least not the sort of stakes that require the prank wars, and this general lackadaisical approach to work might need to come to an end. Brooklyn Nine-Nine isn't a dramatic cop show, of course, so it's allowed a bit of leeway as far as it concerns reality, but we're back on track with the through line about Holt's attempts to whip his crew, and his legacy, into shape. Too bad that won't involve Sedgwick from here on out, but it’s heartening to see the show commit to its arc all around."
