= Paranoia (Brooklyn Nine-Nine) =

- Brooklyn Nine-Nine episode
- Episode no.: Season 3 Episode 20
- Directed by: Payman Benz
- Written by: Gabe Liedman
- Cinematography by: Giovani Lampassi
- Editing by: Sandra Montiel
- Production code: 320
- Original air date: March 29, 2016
- Running time: 22 minutes

Guest appearances
- Jason Mantzoukas as Adrian Pimento

Episode chronology
← Previous "Terry Kitties"	Next → "Maximum Security"
- Brooklyn Nine-Nine season 3

"Paranoia" is the twentieth episode of the third season of the American television police sitcom series Brooklyn Nine-Nine. It is the 65th overall episode of the series, written by Gabe Liedman, and directed by Payman Benz. It aired on Fox in the United States on March 29, 2016.

The show revolves around the fictitious 99th precinct of the New York Police Department in Brooklyn and the officers and detectives that work in the precinct. In the episode, Rosa (Stephanie Beatriz) and Adrian Pimento (Jason Mantzoukas) announce that they will marry in a week and they respectively have their bachelor/bachelorette parties. However, Adrian is convinced that a hitman is coming for him after going out of Figgis' gang.

The episode was seen by an estimated 2.02 million household viewers and gained a 0.9/3 ratings share among adults aged 18–49, according to Nielsen Media Research. The episode received generally positive reviews from critics, who praised the plot in the episode, although some noted similarity to the Parks and Recreation episode, Two Parties.

== Plot ==
After catching a perp, Rosa Diaz (Stephanie Beatriz) and Adrian Pimento (Jason Mantzoukas) announce to the precinct that they are getting married, much to their shock. What's more shocking is when they announce the wedding is one week away. Adrian asks Jake Peralta (Andy Samberg) to be his best man, which he accepts. Rosa also has Charles Boyle (Joe Lo Truglio), Amy Santiago (Melissa Fumero), and Gina Linetti (Chelsea Peretti) as her maids of honor.

Jake prepares a bachelor party for Adrian on a party bus, with the help of Terry Jeffords (Terry Crews), Michael Hitchcock (Dirk Blocker) and Norm Scully (Joel McKinnon Miller). Terry remains skeptical, as Adrian's attitude may ruin the party. However, Adrian takes the party bus, as he states a hitman is coming for him. Inspecting a nearby building, they find no one there and head to a restaurant to toast the party. However, the hitman (Max Silvestri) arrives but they subdue and interrogate him. They learn that he was hired by Jimmy "The Butcher" Figgis, a high-level gangster that Adrian previously infiltrated.

After failing to decide on which party to celebrate, Rosa has the three maids do their parties. Gina's party involves paint-ball, Amy's party involves drunk trivia about Rosa, and Boyle's party involves wrecking an abandoned restaurant. Rosa names Boyle's party as the best. Later, Jake and Terry stage Adrian's murder and deliver false evidence of his death to the man who ordered the hit. He leaves a package with Jake, who notes a scar on his hand. They trail him to an FBI building, and discern that he is an agent. The precinct decides to secretly find the mole while Pimento goes into hiding. Before leaving, he says goodbye to Rosa.

== Reception ==
=== Viewers ===
In its original American broadcast, "Paranoia" was seen by an estimated 2.02 million household viewers and gained a 0.9/3 ratings share among adults aged 18–49, according to Nielsen Media Research. This was a slight increase in viewership from the previous episode, which was watched by 1.95 million viewers with a 0.8/3 in the 18-49 demographics. This means that 0.9 percent of all households with televisions watched the episode, while 3 percent of all households watching television at that time watched it. With these ratings, Brooklyn Nine-Nine was the third most watched show on FOX for the night, beating a rerun of The Grinder and a rerun of Grandfathered, but behind New Girl, fourth on its timeslot and twelfth for the night, behind New Girl, The Late Late Show Carpool Karaoke Primetime Special, Agents of S.H.I.E.L.D., The Real O'Neals, Fresh Off the Boat, a rerun of NCIS: New Orleans, a rerun of NCIS, The Flash, Chicago Fire, Chicago Med, and The Voice.

=== Critical reviews ===
"Paranoia" received generally positive reviews from critics. LaToya Ferguson of The A.V. Club gave the episode a "B+" grade and wrote, "'Paranoia' is a very fun — and surprisingly emotional — episode of Brooklyn Nine-Nine. Surely that's expected in an episode that technically consists of bachelor and bachelorette party plots, but there still deserves to be some acknowledgement about just how fun the episode is." Allie Pape from Vulture gave the show a 3 star rating out of 5 and wrote, "Brooklyn Nine-Nine has always been a goofy show, but I wouldn't necessarily call it a madcap one. Even though it has a large cast and usually distributes three plots across each episode, things somehow manage to move at a relatively comfortable comic pace. This episode, though, is ten pounds of the show in a five-pound bag: Relentlessly paced, spanning a ton of locations, with a wild third-act twist that all but careens into a setup for the season's final plotline. It's fun to see the show turned up to 11, but it's also a little confusing, and it comes at the sacrifice of its typically more inventive verbal humor. All in all, the jokes are weaker than average this go-round."

Alan Sepinwall of HitFix wrote, "But 'Paranoia' is probably the show's most overt copying of a Parks episode to date, with the dueling bachelor/bachelorette party structure – one of them mixing work with pleasure, the other turning into a series of mini-parties – making it impossible to ignore the resemblance to season 5's 'Two Parties,' where Chris decides to give all the guys the bachelor party they never had, while Leslie's bachelorette party gets derailed by Lot 48 business." Andy Crump of Paste gave the episode a 9.3 rating and wrote, "This holds true for 'Paranoia,' which is often uproarious, but the episode stresses that emotion is just as important a component to Brooklyn Nine-Nine's greatness as its humor; it may also leave action junkies wishing for an alternate timeline where Dan Goor and Michael Schur hired Gareth Evans to helm the remaining installments of the series' third season."
