= Halloween II (Brooklyn Nine-Nine) =

- Brooklyn Nine-Nine episode
- Episode no.: Season 2 Episode 4
- Directed by: Eric Appel
- Written by: Prentice Penny
- Cinematography by: Giovani Lampassi
- Editing by: Cortney Carrillo
- Production code: 204
- Original air date: October 19, 2014
- Running time: 22 minutes

Guest appearance
- Apollo Robbins as Eric "Fingers" Martin

Episode chronology
← Previous "The Jimmy Jab Games"	Next → "The Mole"
- Brooklyn Nine-Nine season 2

"Halloween II" is the fourth episode of the second season of the American television police sitcom series Brooklyn Nine-Nine. It is the 26th overall episode of the series and is written by consulting producer Prentice Penny and directed by Eric Appel. It aired on Fox in the United States on October 19, 2014.

The show revolves around the fictitious 99th precinct of the New York Police Department in Brooklyn and the officers and detectives that work in the precinct. Jake Peralta (Andy Samberg) is an immature yet very talented detective in the precinct with an astounding record of crimes solved, putting him in a competition with fellow detective Amy Santiago (Melissa Fumero). The precinct's status changes when the Captain is retiring and a new commanding officer, Cpt. Raymond Holt (Andre Braugher) is appointed as the newest Captain. This creates a conflict between Jake and Holt over their respective methods in the field. In the episode, Jake and Holt continue with their annual Halloween contests. This time, Jake has until midnight to steal Holt's watch or he will do five weeks of overtime for free. Jake, with help from the precinct, manages to get the watch from a criminal. However, the criminal runs away with the watch and upon learning of the importance of the watch, Jake sets to find him. Meanwhile, Gina begins to skip duties unexpectedly.

The episode was seen by an estimated 5.22 million household viewers and gained a 2.5/7 ratings share among adults aged 18–49, according to Nielsen Media Research. The episode received positive reviews from critics, who praised the writing and Braugher's performance.

== Plot ==
In the cold open, Boyle tries to have the squad pick his Halloween costume, dressing up as a peach, William Shakespeare, and He-Man.

After his victory the year prior, Jake proposes to continue the heist bet with Holt. Jake's heist last year was to remove Holt's Medal of Valor from the wall (which was removed by Holt and put in a safe to make it even harder for Jake) before midnight. This time, Holt's wrist watch is the target. If Jake wins, Holt will do Jake's paperwork for one week, but if Holt wins, Jake will do five weeks of unpaid overtime.

Getting help from the precinct, Jake brings in a pickpocket (Apollo Robbins) to steal the watch. However, the criminal runs away with the watch, and Jake learns from Holt that it belonged to his husband Kevin's father before he died. He and Boyle (Joe Lo Truglio) meet with the criminal, who takes Jake's money and shoes in exchange for the location of the watch, which the criminal says is in Jake's car. When they go to retrieve it, they find that the car has been towed. Meanwhile, Amy (Melissa Fumero) and Rosa (Stephanie Beatriz) are upset when Terry (Terry Crews) does not punish Gina (Chelsea Peretti) for skipping out on her duties at the precinct to attend dance practice. It is revealed that Gina has been secretly going back to college which has caused her to miss dance rehearsals.

While passing through a crowd of party-goers, Jake manages to get on a party bus to get to the impound lot but loses track of Boyle. When he arrives to impound, he realises that he has lost his badge and ID, and cannot claim his car. He tries to sneak through the fence but is arrested by guards. In the interrogation room, Holt shows Jake that the watch never left his person to begin with. Holt reveals that after losing the bet to Jake last year, he immediately planned his payback. For the entire year, he had manipulated Jake into wanting to steal his watch by constantly pointing at it whenever Jake was late coming into work. The pickpocket was on Holt's payroll, and Holt had organized everyone to go against Jake as everyone wanted to humiliate him.

In the end, Captain Holt and the group celebrates Holt's victory at the bar. Jake tells Holt that he has already started planning for next year's heist, to which Holt replies that he is only three months behind.

== Reception ==
=== Viewers ===
In its original American broadcast, "Halloween II" was seen by an estimated 5.22 million household viewers and gained a 2.5/7 ratings share among adults aged 18–49, according to Nielsen Media Research. This was a 15% increase in viewership from the previous episode, which was watched by 4.51 million viewers with a 2.2/6 in the 18-49 demographics. This means that 2.5 percent of all households with televisions watched the episode, while 7 percent of all households watching television at that time watched it. With these ratings, Brooklyn Nine-Nine was the second most watched show on FOX for the night, beating Mulaney and Family Guy but behind The Simpsons, fifth on its timeslot and fifth for the night, behind Once Upon a Time, The Simpsons, The OT, and NBC Sunday Night Football.

=== Critical reviews ===
"Halloween II" received positive reviews from critics. LaToya Ferguson of The A.V. Club gave the episode a "C+" grade and wrote, "The problem with Brooklyn Nine-Nine is that the 'bad' episodes are still at least decently humorous episodes of television. That's sort of a nonsense problem, but it still exists. Lesser episodes of the show may feature a lack of cohesion, but the audience can always rest assured that there will be an endless supply of quotable jokes. Now there's nothing wrong with being a joke factory, but that's not exactly what Brooklyn Nine-Nine is selling, and this episode is the perfect example that Brooklyn Nine-Nine can't simply rest on those joke laurels."

Jackson McHenry of Entertainment Weekly wrote, "Sequels are like caricatures. In trying to replicate the original, they tend to exaggerate its basic elements to the point of ridiculousness. Minor things become overused: A funny side character turns into a main character, a cute gag inflates into the whole plot. This can be great — I'll defend Shrek 2 over the original any day — but the result usually ends up feeling a little thin. This week's Brooklyn Nine-Nine attempted to cap off last year's excellent 'Halloween' with a cheeky follow-up, but, with the same plots, and nearly the same conclusion, 'Halloween II' emphasized the show's weaknesses." Allie Pape from Vulture gave the show a 4 star rating out of 5 and wrote, "I've already come out strongly in favor of Brooklyn Nine-Nine's all-cast-antics episodes, particularly when it comes to reprising one of my favorites, last year's Halloween team-up to steal Holt's Medal of Valor. This year, the quarry was his watch, a gift from Kevin Cozner's dying father (but please don't call it the 'death watch'). And even though I could see two of the twists coming from a mile away — Holt winning this year because Peralta beating him twice would throw off the balance of power between the two, and Fingers the thief stealing the watch once he got a chance because duh — I still enjoyed watching it all go down."

Alan Sepinwall of HitFix wrote, "Another solid outing in a season that's been clicking very well so far. And I like the idea of Halloween bets being a tradition on this show like Ron & Tammy or Bar Wars episodes on some other fine comedies." Andy Crump of Paste gave the episode a 6.7 and wrote, "The good news here is that Brooklyn Nine-Nine doesn't seem to be losing its spirit. It will forever remain a tribute to farce, with an endless supply of zany vim. It does, however, appear to be losing its direction, which may be a bit of an alarmist observation, given that we're only four episodes deep into Season Two. But 'Halloween II' gets too wrapped up in its central caper to deliver on its best attribute — its character work. Without that, Brooklyn Nine-Nine is just another sitcom to breeze through, rather than savor."

== See also ==
- Halloween (Brooklyn Nine-Nine)
- Halloween III (Brooklyn Nine-Nine)
- Halloween IV (Brooklyn Nine-Nine)
