= The Mattress (Brooklyn Nine-Nine) =

- Brooklyn Nine-Nine episode
- Episode no.: Season 3 Episode 7
- Directed by: Dean Holland
- Written by: Laura McCreary
- Cinematography by: Giovani Lampassi
- Editing by: Cortney Carrillo
- Production code: 307
- Original air date: November 15, 2015
- Running time: 22 minutes

Guest appearances
- Robin Bartlett as Miss Miriam; Michael Blaiklock as Brian Hip

Episode chronology
← Previous "Into the Woods"	Next → "Ava"
- Brooklyn Nine-Nine season 3

"The Mattress" is the seventh episode of the third season of the American television police sitcom series Brooklyn Nine-Nine. It is the 52nd overall episode of the series and is written by Laura McCreary and directed by Dean Holland. It aired on Fox in the United States on November 15, 2015.

The show revolves around the fictitious 99th precinct of the New York Police Department in Brooklyn and the officers and detectives that work in the precinct. In the episode, Amy blames Jake's old mattress for her back pain, and Jake is too cheap to buy a new one. This leads to subsequent fights over the mattress. Meanwhile, Boyle scratches Holt's classic sports car, which is parked crookedly over the line marking in the parking spot. Also, Rosa discovers that a teenage boy she once helped straighten out has been arrested.

The episode was seen by an estimated 2.69 million household viewers and gained a 1.3/4 ratings share among adults aged 18–49, according to Nielsen Media Research. The episode received mixed-to-positive reviews from critics, who praised the cast, but some considered the storylines "weak".

== Plot ==
Jake (Andy Samberg) is told by Amy (Melissa Fumero) that she has experienced back pain after sleeping on his old mattress, and asks Jake to buy a new one. While this happens, Holt (Andre Braugher) assigns them a case regarding a new drug in town, despite being worried that their relationship could ruin the operation.

While shopping for a new mattress, Jake and Amy get into an argument after Jake refuses to pay for an expensive mattress. Later, while watching the drug dealer, Jake and Amy get into another argument, which alerts the dealer and he escapes, upsetting Holt for mishandling the operation. Holt then talks to Jake, explaining that his relationship with Kevin was difficult at the start but they showed they cared when Kevin bought a classic sports car. Upon hearing this, Jake decides to buy the mattress.

Meanwhile, Boyle (Joe Lo Truglio) is upset, as his parking space is blocked by the classic sports car that Holt has identified as a precious family heirloom. While trying to take his car out, he scratches the car by accident, angering Holt, who has Boyle pay for the damage. Gina (Chelsea Peretti) then helps Boyle by putting a cupcake on Holt's chair, ruining his pants, but making him see his mistake.

Rosa (Stephanie Beatriz) deals with Sam, a teenage boy she once helped straighten out. He returns to the precinct after shoplifting. Terry (Terry Crews) then explains to Rosa that acting rudely towards him will not solve the problem. To prove his point, he tracks down Rosa's childhood ballet teacher Ms. Miriam, which serves as an example of a nurturing role model, but Rosa points out that Ms. Miriam was actually very strict with her. Later, Rosa tells Terry that she let Sam off with a warning, citing how Ms. Miriam's harsh teaching style made her miserable and eventually drove her to quit dancing.

== Reception ==
=== Viewers ===
In its original American broadcast, "The Mattress" was seen by an estimated 2.69 million household viewers and gained a 1.3/4 ratings share among adults aged 18–49, according to Nielsen Media Research. This was a slight increase in viewership from the previous episode, which was watched by 2.65 million viewers with a 1.2/3 in the 18-49 demographics. This means that 1.3 percent of all households with televisions watched the episode, while 4 percent of all households watching television at that time watched it. With these ratings, Brooklyn Nine-Nine was the second most watched show on FOX for the night, beating The Last Man on Earth, but behind Family Guy, fourth on its timeslot and seventh for the night, behind Quantico, Madam Secretary, Family Guy, Once Upon a Time, 60 Minutes, and Sunday Night Football.

=== Critical reviews ===
"The Mattress" received mixed-to-positive reviews from critics. Jesse Hassenger of The A.V. Club gave the episode a "A" grade and wrote, "But the biggest problem with 'The Mattress' is that it's the biggest example of that 'perfectly fine' status. In fact, it feels like an episode composed of three different C-plots, which is about as 'perfectly fine' as you can get." Allie Pape from Vulture gave the show a 4 star rating out of 5 and wrote, "In its first two seasons, B99 had a pretty tenuous relationship to reality, even by sitcom standards. But this season, things have gotten more grounded, and I’m enjoying the show's willingness to dwell on emotional beats, like Amy and Holt's stop-and-frisk talk or Rosa's confession of her relationship fears to Holt."

Alan Sepinwall of HitFix wrote, "'The Mattress,' on the other hand, had some stories that were less successful individually, but boosted a pair of them by tying them together at the end." Andy Crump of Paste gave the episode an 8.0 rating and wrote, "Maybe 'The Mattress' will prove minor in the long run, but in the meantime, watching the characters evolve one argument at a time proves to be a real pleasure — as it always does."
