= Adrian Pimento (Brooklyn Nine-Nine episode) =

- Brooklyn Nine-Nine episode
- Episode no.: Season 3 Episode 17
- Directed by: Maggie Carey
- Written by: Luke Del Tredici
- Cinematography by: Giovani Lampassi
- Editing by: Cortney Carrillo
- Production code: 317
- Original air date: February 23, 2016
- Running time: 22 minutes

Guest appearances
- Jason Mantzoukas as Adrian Pimento; Kate Flannery as "Mean" Marge Bronigan; Tricia McAlpin as Maggie; Richard Penn as David; Amanda Rivas as Jenny; Harry Yi as Henderson

Episode chronology
← Previous "House Mouses"	Next → "Cheddar"
- Brooklyn Nine-Nine season 3

"Adrian Pimento" is the seventeenth episode of the third season of the American television police sitcom series Brooklyn Nine-Nine. It is the 62nd overall episode of the series and is written by Luke Del Tredici and directed by Maggie Carey. It aired on Fox in the United States on February 23, 2016.

The show revolves around the fictitious 99th precinct of the New York Police Department in Brooklyn and the officers and detectives that work in the precinct. In the episode, Detective Adrian Pimento (Jason Mantzoukas) returns after being undercover for 12 years and working for Jimmy "The Butcher" Figgis. Meanwhile, Gina Linetti (Chelsea Peretti) directs a video that details the daily life of the precinct and Charles Boyle (Joe Lo Truglio) has to fix things after angering the head of custodians (Kate Flannery).

The episode was seen by an estimated 2.13 million household viewers and gained a 0.9/3 ratings share among adults aged 18–49, according to Nielsen Media Research. The episode received positive reviews from critics, who praised Mantzoukas's performance in the episode.

== Plot ==
The precinct welcomes Detective Adrian Pimento (Jason Mantzoukas), a police officer who was undercover for 12 years working for high-ranking mobster Jimmy "The Butcher" Figgis. Due to the extreme measures he took to earn Figgis' respect, Pimento has severe post-traumatic stress disorder.

Jake (Andy Samberg) wants to work on a case with him, despite objections from Holt (Andre Braugher) and Terry (Terry Crews). Eventually, Adrian agrees to work with him on a robbery case. However, Adrian's behavior raises suspicions to Jake, who believes he may still be working with Figgis. Jake asks Rosa (Stephanie Beatriz) for help, while she has feelings for Adrian. However, it is revealed Adrian simply retrieved his memorabilia and left the police. He felt that he was not ready and was also angry because the precinct doesn't trust him. Jake convinces him to return to the precinct and they finish their robbery case.

Meanwhile, Holt asks Gina (Chelsea Peretti) to make a video about the daily workings of the precinct. However, her style and tone are met with disapproval from Holt and she is dismissed. Later, she uses Holt's audio recordings to make another video, which he approves of. Also, Boyle's (Joe Lo Truglio) actions with a faulty pressure cooker, and further accidental insults, have resulted in the refusal of the head of custodians, Mean Marge (Kate Flannery), to take out the trash. After days of trash piling up inside the building, the precinct makes an agreement to rename the break room after Marge.

== Reception ==
=== Viewers ===
In its original American broadcast, "Adrian Pimento" was seen by an estimated 2.13 million household viewers and gained a 0.9/3 ratings share among adults aged 18–49, according to Nielsen Media Research. This was a slight decrease in viewership from the previous episode, which was watched by 2.18 million viewers with a 0.9/3 in the 18–49 demographics. This means that 0.9 percent of all households with televisions watched the episode, while 3 percent of all households watching television at that time watched it. With these ratings, Brooklyn Nine-Nine was the second most watched show on FOX for the night, beating The Grinder and Grandfathered, but behind New Girl, third in its timeslot and tenth for the night, behind Hollywood Game Night, Limitless, New Girl, Fresh Off the Boat, The Flash, Chicago Med, Chicago Fire, NCIS: New Orleans, and NCIS.

=== Critical reviews ===
"Adrian Pimento" received positive reviews from critics. Genevieve Valentine of The A.V. Club gave the episode a "B+" grade and wrote, "'Adrian Pimento' is tricky because it's a high-concept episode committed to taking the Dark Brooding Cop Show down a peg, one crying, blood-soaked flashback at a time. On paper and out of context as staunchly optimistic as Brooklyn Nine-Nine, Adrian Pimento could have walked off an FX pilot." Allie Pape from Vulture gave the show a 4 star rating out of 5 and wrote, "Seeing Rosa get excited about anything is always a recipe for laughs, and I think Mantzoukas's mania might play better against her laconic vibe than it does against Andy Samberg's high-energy sweetness."

Alan Sepinwall of HitFix wrote, "Brooklyn Nine-Nine, meanwhile, gave us one of this season's more frantically-paced episodes in 'Adrian Pimento.' The title character, played by Jason Mantzoukas, was such a tonal departure from what the show usually does that it really needed more time to properly develop, as opposed to being squeezed into an episode with two subplots that also weren’t fully-baked." Andy Crump of Paste gave the episode a 8.6 rating and wrote, "As with most marquee guest stars, Mantzoukas is paired off with Andy Samberg, whose talent for instant histrionics is grossly outmatched by his co-star's. 'Adrian Pimento' has a lot of fun dabbling in anti-comedy, as Pimento arrives in the 9-9 and begins 'funny' sharing stories of his time as a hatchet man for an apparently very unpleasant mobster named 'The Butcher.'"
