= Your Honor (Brooklyn Nine-Nine) =

- Brooklyn Nine-Nine episode
- Episode no.: Season 4 Episode 19
- Directed by: Michael McDonald
- Written by: David Phillips & Carly Hallam Tosh
- Cinematography by: Giovani Lampassi
- Editing by: Jason Gill
- Production code: 419
- Original air date: May 16, 2017
- Running time: 22 minutes

Guest appearance
- L. Scott Caldwell as Laverne Holt

Episode chronology
← Previous "Chasing Amy"	Next → "The Slaughterhouse"
- Brooklyn Nine-Nine season 4

"Your Honor" is the nineteenth episode of the fourth season of the American television police sitcom series Brooklyn Nine-Nine and the 87th overall episode of the series. The episode was written by David Phillips & Carly Hallam Tosh and directed by Michael McDonald. It aired on Fox in the United States on May 16, 2017, back-to-back with the next episode "The Slaughterhouse".

The show revolves around the fictitious 99th precinct of the New York Police Department in Brooklyn and the officers and detectives that work in the precinct. In the episode, Jake Peralta (Andy Samberg) meets Captain Raymond Holt's (Andre Braugher) mother, the Honorable Laverne Holt (L. Scott Caldwell), who asks for help due to a break-in at her house. Meanwhile, Amy Santiago (Melissa Fumero) helps a disinterested Gina Linetti (Chelsea Peretti) in changing a tire while Terry Jeffords (Terry Crews), Charles Boyle (Joe Lo Truglio) and Rosa Diaz (Stephanie Beatriz) refurnish the break room.

The episode was seen by an estimated 1.65 million household viewers and gained a 0.7/3 ratings share among adults aged 18–49, according to Nielsen Media Research. The episode received positive reviews from critics, who praised Caldwell's performance and the writing.

== Plot ==
In the cold open, Jake interrogates a tough robbery suspect and gets him to confess to the crime after accidentally breaking the door handle to the interrogation room and suffering a panic attack.

Jake (Andy Samberg) finds that Holt (Andre Braugher) has a visitor in his office, his mother the Honorable Laverne Holt (L. Scott Caldwell). She wants their help as there was a break-in at her house, to which they agree to help her.

Jake, Holt and Laverne arrive at a wine club to inspect anyone who could have gotten into her house, as several other members have also suffered recent break-ins. Jake and Holt suspect George Kenderson (Kim Estes) may be responsible, as he behaves suspiciously and is found to have a recent parking ticket near Laverne's apartment. While Holt goes to investigate, Laverne tells Jake that she knows George is innocent because he is her boyfriend of two years, which her son is oblivious to. When Jake and Holt chase George, Jake is forced to tell Holt about it, upsetting him. He attempts to arrest Laverne for obstruction of justice, but Jake talks him down. They later arrest the wine club owner and her husband for the robberies. At the precinct, Holt and Laverne discuss how they stopped opening up to each other after Holt's father died. Holt accepts the new man in Laverne's life and they agree to be more communicative.

Meanwhile, Gina (Chelsea Peretti) has a flat tire on her car and forcefully accepts Amy's (Melissa Fumero) help to change it. However, she doesn't pay attention when Amy changes the tire so an angry Amy accidentally cuts into another car's tire. Gina then uses a video (and Amy's car) to change the tire. Also, Terry (Terry Crews), Boyle (Joe Lo Truglio) and Rosa (Stephanie Beatriz) decide to refurnish the break room according to their taste, angering Hitchcock (Dirk Blocker) and Scully (Joel McKinnon Miller). The new break room goes unused as the new furnishings are all impractical. Eventually, the room is put back to its previous state, with the exception of a new couch.

== Reception ==
=== Viewers ===
In its original American broadcast, "Your Honor" was seen by an estimated 1.65 million household viewers and gained a 0.7/3 ratings share among adults aged 18–49, according to Nielsen Media Research. This was slight increase in viewership from the previous episode, which was watched by 1.61 million viewers with a 0.6/2 in the 18-49 demographics. This means that 0.7 percent of all households with televisions watched the episode, while 3 percent of all households watching television at that time watched it. With these ratings, Brooklyn Nine-Nine was the second highest rated show on FOX for the night, behind Prison Break, sixth on its timeslot and fifteenth for the night, behind two episodes of Great News, Agents of S.H.I.E.L.D., Prison Break, Imaginary Mary, The Flash, Fresh Off the Boat, NCIS: New Orleans, American Housewife, The Middle, Chicago Fire, Bull, NCIS, and The Voice.

=== Critical reviews ===
"Your Honor" received positive reviews from critics. LaToya Ferguson of The A.V. Club gave the episode an "A−" grade and wrote: "'Your Honor' is the stronger episode as a whole, with the introduction of Holt's federal judge mother Laverne (L. Scott Caldwell), the transformation of the Nine-Nine's break room (another necessary Nine-Nine upgrade), and the Amy/Gina team-up all providing constant laughs."

In a comparison with the following episode ("The Slaughterhouse"), Alan Sepinwall of Uproxx wrote, "Of the two, 'Your Honor' is a bit funnier overall, if only because Jake and Holt is the show's best possible A-story pairing, and probably the best overall pairing(*), and any circumstance where Jake gets to act superior to his commanding officer — especially when he has legit reason to feel that way — tends to be comically fruitful." Alexis Gunderson of Paste gave the episode a 8.4 and wrote: "'Your Honor' punches above its weight not only comedically, but emotionally. It doesn't reach 'Moo Moo' levels — family drama, no matter how touching, is a much easier ring for a sitcom to grab than systemic injustice — but considering the fact that the characters whose emotional development it hinges on are the stoic Captain Holt and his even more stoic mother, the Honorable Laverne Holt, whose declarations of devotion come in the form of specific percentage increases, it really delivers."
