= The Audit =

The Audit may refer to:

- The Audit (Brooklyn Nine-Nine), an episode of Brooklyn Nine-Nine
- The Audit (Golden Girls episode), an episode of The Golden Girls
- Audenshaw School#The Audit, a school magazine
