= Chasing Amy (Brooklyn Nine-Nine) =

- Brooklyn Nine-Nine episode
- Episode no.: Season 4 Episode 18
- Directed by: Luke Del Tredici
- Written by: Matt Lawton
- Cinematography by: Giovani Lampassi
- Editing by: Jason Gill
- Production code: 417
- Original air date: May 9, 2017
- Running time: 22 minutes

Guest appearance
- Sarah Baker as Kylie

Episode chronology
← Previous "Cop-Con"	Next → "Your Honor"
- Brooklyn Nine-Nine season 4

"Chasing Amy" is the eighteenth episode of the fourth season of the American television police sitcom series Brooklyn Nine-Nine and the 86th overall episode of the series. The episode was written by Matt Lawton and directed by Luke Del Tredici. It aired on Fox in the United States on May 9, 2017, back-to-back with the previous episode "Cop-Con".

The show revolves around the fictitious 99th precinct of the New York Police Department in Brooklyn and the officers and detectives that work in the precinct. In the episode, Amy is about to take her sergeant's exam but is nervous that her relationship with Jake could get strained. Meanwhile, Terry and Holt build model trains for the lobby while Gina inherits an heirloom from the Boyle family, accidentally destroying it.

The episode was seen by an estimated 1.61 million household viewers and gained a 0.6/2 ratings share among adults aged 18–49, according to Nielsen Media Research. The episode received generally positive reviews from critics, who praised Fumero's performance but the rest of the storylines received a mixed response.

== Plot ==
Amy (Melissa Fumero) is stressed as she's about to do her sergeant's exam. Jake (Andy Samberg) tries to calm her down and guides her into getting prepared for it and leaves her in the briefing room with a practice exam. However, he finds that the practice exam freaked Amy out and she has left the precinct.

Jake asks Rosa (Stephanie Beatriz) for help in finding Amy. Thinking like Amy, they visit her friend Kylie (Sarah Baker), who is always mad at Jake for ruining "trivia nights". She gives them a case that Amy asked, the file where she and Jake had their first date. Finding her at the rooftop, Amy explains that she worries that if she passes, their relationship could get strained. He convinces her to take it and she arrives in time to start the exam, managing to finish it early. As a reward, she has the trivia nights accommodate Jake's interests.

Meanwhile, Gina (Chelsea Peretti) is bequeathed an important Boyle family heirloom that belonged to Boyle's (Joe Lo Truglio) recently deceased aunt but she accidentally destroys. As a result, she is expelled from the Boyle family (much to her delight) but Boyle is expelled as well for bringing her in. She then decides to help him by having another heirloom but this causes her to get invited back. Also, Terry (Terry Crews) and Holt (Andre Braugher) compete to see who can build the best train model station in the lobby for the kids. However, the kid who checks them is bored and prefers a video game.

== Reception ==
=== Viewers ===
In its original American broadcast, "Chasing Amy" was seen by an estimated 1.61 million household viewers and gained a 0.6/2 ratings share among adults aged 18–49, according to Nielsen Media Research. This was slight decrease in viewership from the previous episode, which was watched by 1.72 million viewers with a 0.6/3 in the 18-49 demographics. This means that 0.6 percent of all households with televisions watched the episode, while 2 percent of all households watching television at that time watched it. With these ratings, Brooklyn Nine-Nine was the second highest rated show on FOX for the night, behind Prison Break, sixth on its timeslot and fifteenth for the night, behind Agents of S.H.I.E.L.D., two episodes of Great News, Prison Break, Imaginary Mary, The Flash, Fresh Off the Boat, NCIS: New Orleans, American Housewife, The Middle, Chicago Fire, Bull, NCIS, and The Voice.

=== Critical reviews ===
"Chasing Amy" received generally positive reviews from critics. LaToya Ferguson of The A.V. Club gave the episode a "C+" grade and wrote, "'Chasing Amy,' on the other hand, has a very strong, albeit broad (see: Amy's hair) A-plot going for it with Amy and the sergeant's exam... but the rest of the episode doesn't quite hold up. While it's always nice to have a reminder of the Boyle/Linetti family relationship, their 'mother dough' plot isn't all that great of a use of either Joe Lo Truglio or Chelsea Peretti's comedic talents, no matter how many times Boyle says 'tang' or Gina disregards what Boyle has to say."

Alan Sepinwall of Uproxx wrote, "'Chasing Amy,' meanwhile, was a more traditionally structured A-B-C story episode, with very strong Jake/Amy relationship spotlight at the forefront. Brooklyn has very gracefully disproved the whole 'happy couples ruin shows' nonsense, doing stories about their relationship only when there's a good idea (like their competition to see whose apartment they would move into), and otherwise just letting it be a fact of life for the squad." Andy Crump of Paste gave the episode a 7.6 and wrote, "And 'Chasing Amy' gives a firm boost to Jamy's relationship, and if we're being honest, that's a necessary step following 'Moo Moo' teasing them out as potential candidates for parenthood. If it's not exactly uncommon these days for male leads on sitcoms to espouse progressive beliefs as regards women's primacy in the workplace, it's still refreshing for Jake to admit the truth."
