= Coral Palms =

- Brooklyn Nine-Nine episodes
- Episode nos.: Season 4 Episodes 1, 2 & 3
- Directed by: Michael McDonald (Pt. 1); Trent O'Donnell (Pt. 2); Payman Benz (Pt. 3)
- Written by: Dan Goor; Tricia McAlpin; Justin Noble
- Cinematography by: Giovani Lampassi
- Editing by: Cortney Carrillo; Jason Gill
- Production codes: 401, 402 & 403
- Original air dates: September 20, 2016 (Pt. 1); September 27, 2016 (Pt. 2); October 4, 2016 (Pt. 3)
- Running time: 66 minutes

Guest appearances
- Pt. 1: Jorma Taccone as Taylor; Rhea Perlman as Esther; Betsy Sodaro as Jordan Carfton; Maya Rudolph as Karen Haas; Pt. 2: Ken Marino as Jason "C.J." Stentley; Jim O'Heir as Sheriff Reynolds; Esther Povitsky as Emily; Maya Rudolph as Karen Haas; Pt. 3: Ken Marino as Jason "C.J." Stentley; Jim O'Heir as Sheriff Reynolds; Eric Roberts as Jimmy "The Butcher" Figgis

Episode chronology
← Previous "Greg and Larry"	Next → "The Night Shift"
- Brooklyn Nine-Nine season 4

"Coral Palms" is the season premiere of the fourth season of the American television police sitcom series Brooklyn Nine-Nine, consisting of the first through third episodes. They are also the 69th through 71st overall episodes of the series. "Pt. 1" is written by series co-creator Dan Goor and directed by Michael McDonald, "Pt. 2" is written by Tricia McAlpin and directed by Trent O'Donnell, and "Pt. 3" is written by Justin Noble and directed by Payment Benz. The episodes aired on Fox in the United States with "Pt. 1" airing on September 20, 2016, "Pt. 2" airing on September 27, 2016, and "Pt. 3" airing on October 4, 2016.

The show revolves around the fictitious 99th precinct of the New York Police Department in Brooklyn and the officers and detectives that work in the precinct. After the lives of Jake and Holt are threatened by Jimmy "The Butcher" Figgis, they are forced to relocate to Florida in the Witness Protection Program. In the episodes, Jake and Holt decide to continue investigating Figgis despite the U.S. Marshal Haas' warning but both have problems in not letting their covers getting blown. Andy Samberg and Andre Braugher are the only members of the main cast to appear in "Coral Palms Pt. 1"; as such, they are the only actors to appear in every episode of Brooklyn Nine-Nine.

According to Nielsen Media Research, "Pt. 1" was seen by an estimated 2.39 million household viewers and gained a 1.1/4 ratings share among adults aged 18–49, "Pt. 2" was seen by an estimated 2.34 million household viewers and gained a 1.0/4 ratings share among adults aged 18–49, and "Pt. 3" was seen by an estimated 2.40 million household viewers and gained a 1.0/4 ratings share among adults aged 18–49. The episodes received generally positive reviews from critics, who praised the cast's performance as well as Ken Marino's guest performance. The tone and the pace, however, received more criticism.

== Plot ==
=== Pt. 1 ===
Jake (Andy Samberg) and Holt (Andre Braugher) have been living in the witness protection program at Coral Palms, Florida for 6 months under the respective aliases of "Larry' and "Greg". While they want to continue working on finding Figgis, U.S. Marshal Karen Haas (Maya Rudolph) forbids them from doing so, as it would put their lives in danger. Haas also informs them that despite numerous operations, they haven't found Figgis.

Unknown to Haas, Jake is revealed to be secretly working on the case in a storage unit. Holt finds him and scolds him for putting their lives at risk and tells him to get a job while he takes the file. However, Jake decides to work at the Fun Zone and is subsequently named Assistant Manager, much to Holt's disdain, who works there and was looking for the position. As his boss, Jake begins giving Holt ridiculous tasks to blackmail him into giving him the file. During one of their discussions, they are both hit by go-karts while a woman records them, planning to put it on the Internet.

They ask the woman for the phone but she demands 15,000 dollars for the video. They attempt to trick her with fake money but she doesn't fall for it and leaves with the phone. After Holt scolds Jake for his behavior, Jake reveals he switched the phones and leaves disappointed. Holt is given the position of Assistant Manager at the Fun Zone but finds he has no interest in life in Florida. He meets with Jake, apologizing for what he said and gives him the files back. Despite retrieving the video, they decide to upload it so they can lure Figgis and catch him.

=== Pt. 2 ===
Holt tells Jake that Figgis contacted the Fun Zone, proving their video managed to catch his attention. They then set to buy weapons from a store. Despite not carrying a license, the owner sells it to them. However, their car is stopped by Sheriff Reynolds (Jim O'Heir), who finds the weapons and takes them to the station.

Meanwhile, at the 99th precinct, the squad is presented to their new Captain, Jason "C.J." Stentley (Ken Marino). However, he has a hands-off attitude and lets everyone do anything they want, to the point where Gina (Chelsea Peretti) gets her own assistant Emily (Esther Povitsky), Boyle (Joe Lo Truglio) gets a treadmill, Rosa (Stephanie Beatriz) gets an isolated desk and Terry (Terry Crews) gets a yogurt fridge. This bothers Amy (Melissa Fumero), as everyone forgets Holt's message of work. They return their items and ask C.J. to toughen up and be more strict, which he agrees to do.

Back in Florida, Jake and Holt decide to tell the Sheriff their real identities and gives him a number to contact Haas and confirm everything. However, Figgis is revealed to have kidnapped Haas and both are arrested. With the help of their inmates, they stage a fight to get the Sheriff to enter. When this does not work, Jake kisses Holt on the lips. This prompts the Sheriff to enter and both Jake and Holt escape the cell. Now fugitives, they decide to call the precinct. When the squad explains to C.J. that they have to go to Florida, he refuses to let them do it, based on their previous talk.

=== Pt. 3 ===
While still being wanted by the police, Jake and Holt seek shelter in the storage unit. Holt's leg is accidentally impaled by a rod while running, which he removes. Meanwhile, the squad decides to ignore C.J.'s order and go to Florida in Terry's minivan.

After Holt performs self-surgery on his leg, the squad arrives to the storage unit. They plan a way to lure Figgis out and go to Fun Zone to prepare an ambush, while Holt remains with Gina in the storage unit. In the Fun Zone, Jake contacts Figgis (Eric Roberts), who arrives shortly with his men; the men are quickly dispatched by the squad. Seeing that they need help, Holt and Gina both commandeer a semi-trailer truck to the Fun Zone.

Jake intercepts Figgis until he is cornered by Sheriff Reynolds. Figgis shoots Reynolds and takes Jake with him at gunpoint. Amy arrives and shoots Jake in the leg (as instructed) and follows Figgis. Before Figgis can escape in his car, he is hit by the semi-trailer truck. Figgis is arrested and Jake is treated for his injury. The squad returns to the precinct, where C.J. tells them that due to their actions, they will be reassigned to the night shift.

== Reception ==
=== Viewers ===
==== Pt. 1 ====
In its original American broadcast, "Coral Palms Pt. 1" was seen by an estimated 2.39 million household viewers and gained a 1.1/4 ratings share among adults aged 18–49, according to Nielsen Media Research. This was a slight increase in viewership from the previous episode, which was watched by 2.02 million viewers with a 0.9/3 in the 18-49 demographics. This means that 1.1 percent of all households with televisions watched the episode, while 4 percent of all households watching television at that time watched it. With these ratings, Brooklyn Nine-Nine was the second highest rated show on FOX for the night, beating Scream Queens, but behind New Girl, fifth on its timeslot and ninth for the night, behind Agents of S.H.I.E.L.D., New Girl, NCIS: New Orleans, Dancing with the Stars, Bull, NCIS, This Is Us, and The Voice.

==== Pt. 2 ====
In its original American broadcast, "Coral Palms Pt. 2" was seen by an estimated 2.34 million household viewers and gained a 1.0/4 ratings share among adults aged 18–49, according to Nielsen Media Research. This was a slight decrease in viewership from the previous episode, which was watched by 2.39 million viewers with a 1.1/4 in the 18-49 demographics. This means that 1.0 percent of all households with televisions watched the episode, while 4 percent of all households watching television at that time watched it. With these ratings, Brooklyn Nine-Nine was the highest rated show on FOX for the night, beating Scream Queens, and New Girl, fourth on its timeslot and seventh for the night, behind Dancing with the Stars, NCIS: New Orleans, Bull, NCIS, This Is Us, and The Voice.

==== Pt. 3 ====
In its original American broadcast, "Coral Palms Pt. 3" was seen by an estimated 2.40 million household viewers and gained a 1.0/4 ratings share among adults aged 18–49, according to Nielsen Media Research. This was a slight increase in viewership from the previous episode, which was watched by 2.34 million viewers with a 1.0/4 in the 18-49 demographics. This means that 1.0 percent of all households with televisions watched the episode, while 4 percent of all households watching television at that time watched it. With these ratings, Brooklyn Nine-Nine was the highest rated show on FOX for the night, beating New Girl, fifth on its timeslot and fifth for the night, behind The Flash, Dancing with the Stars, NCIS, and Vice Presidential Debate.

=== Critical reviews ===
==== Pt. 1 ====
"Coral Palms Pt. 1" received generally positive reviews from critics. LaToya Ferguson of The A.V. Club gave the episode a "B" grade and wrote, "Of course, 'Coral Palms Pt. 1' is missing the one thing that really makes Brooklyn Nine-Nine stand out as a series: the ensemble. While Holt and Jake recreate the workplace for this workplace sitcom, it really isn't the same without the crew of the Nine-Nine."

Dan Snierson of Entertainment Weekly wrote, "Florida. It's full of hot weather. Oranges. Grandparents. Creepy crime. Hanging chads. Probably some dudes named Chad who like to hang out. It's also a great place to set your NYPD cop comedy, as Brooklyn Nine-Nine proved in its season 4 premiere, which turned out to be 30 minutes of fun in the sun." Allie Pape from Vulture gave the show a 4 star rating out of 5 and wrote, "Nonetheless, I enjoyed getting to see B99 try on a looser vibe. With its big ensemble, the show can often feel overstuffed, but this week, there's lots of time for silly side plots like Holt having to rap for a birthday party, or Holt and Jake wondering who lives in the mini-golf holes."

Alan Sepinwall of HitFix wrote, "Much as I'd love to see Terry, Rosa, Gina, and the rest, Brooklyn is a show that's had trouble juggling stories even in the most traditionally-structured episodes. Here, we got to focus entirely on the Greg and Larry situation, exploring it to its greatest comic potential, and we'll get to catch up with the rest of the gang later." Andy Crump of Paste gave the episode a 8.7 and wrote, "Of course. Of course. But don't let 'of course' lead you astray. Brooklyn Nine-Nine's fourth season opener is predictably of the show's nature, but it’s also totally great."

==== Pt. 2 ====
"Coral Palms Pt. 2" received generally positive reviews from critics. LaToya Ferguson of The A.V. Club gave the episode an "A−" grade and wrote, "'Coral Palms Pt. 1' was a risky episode for Brooklyn Nine-Nine to return with, even though Andy Samberg and Andre Braugher were more than up to the task of handling it all by themselves. The Brooklyn Nine-Nine ensemble had no chance to shine, even though the show did with its own creativity. As I've mentioned before, Brooklyn Nine-Nine's strength as a 'workplace comedy' also comes from its ability to take a typical sitcom plot and make it feel like its own little Brooklyn Nine-Nine thing. So while 'Coral Palms Pt. 1' was a more experimental approach to that, 'Coral Palms Pt. 2' is even better at showing what Brooklyn Nine-Nine can do with its own twist on things."

Dan Snierson of Entertainment Weekly wrote, "You can rip on Florida all you want to. The heat. The people. The crime. Plus, the people. And in 'Coral Palms Pt. 2,' Holt and Jake do just that: During a car ride in what they hope will be their final minutes in the state." Allie Pape from Vulture gave the show a 4 star rating out of 5 and wrote, "After wrapping up last season with a three-episode arc, Brooklyn Nine-Nine certainly gets ambition points for diving into another one to kick off season four. As the middle installment of this trilogy, 'Coral Palms Pt. 2' suffers slightly from having to move around so many pieces (and it definitely loses a few bouts with the Exposition Fairy). Still, it's a funny episode that divides its time nicely between 'Greg' and 'Larry' in Florida and the rest of the Nine-Nine back in New York."

Alan Sepinwall of HitFix wrote, "Mostly, though, it was a situation similar to the Pimento arc from the end of last year, where the plottier Brooklyn gets, the more it invites the audience to start questioning whether the plot makes sense." Andy Crump of Paste gave the episode a 9.0 and wrote, "If last week's 'Coral Palms, Pt. 1' felt like a tonic for its pinpoint focus on Jake and Holt, then this week's 'Coral Palms, Pt. 2' is equally revitalizing just for showing us the rest of Brooklyn Nine-Nine's cast, even if the story still revolves around a precinct divided by geography and by greed."

==== Pt. 3 ====
"Coral Palms Pt. 3" received generally positive reviews from critics. LaToya Ferguson of The A.V. Club gave the episode an "A−" grade and wrote, "That’s a concept that's pretty much thrown out tension-wise come this week's 'Coral Palms Pt. 3' though, as the crew are already in the process of deliberately disobeying their goober new Captain's (Ken Marino's C.J.) orders when the episode checks in on them. There's clearly no time to focus on the decision-making process of that choice — the crew apparently doesn't even have time to get ready and packed for the Florida trip anywhere but the Nine-Nine itself. If that sounds like it's stretching credibility a bit — even in a world where Jake's frosted tips are considered acceptable in 2016 — it's because it and the trip to Florida in general serve as reminders of how Brooklyn Nine-Nine can sometimes have so much material to offer on weekly basis, only to be stifled by the confines of the 30 minute television format."

Dan Snierson of Entertainment Weekly wrote, "You are officially exiting the Fun Zone. Please defrost all tips and return any unused bottles of Liquid Moan to the nearest convenience mart. Tuesday's episode of Brooklyn Nine-Nine concluded the three-part adventure of the witness-protected Jake and Holt in sunny, skeezy Coral Palms, Florida, and finally, Jake faced off with Figgis and saw Amy's face again." Allie Pape from Vulture gave the show a 4 star rating out of 5 and wrote, "The third and final installment of the 'Coral Palms' trilogy is certainly an improvement over the show's previous action-heavy episodes, but it's definitely still a bit subpar. I haven't seen Fox's new Lethal Weapon reboot, but given the expectations for that franchise to have both comedy and credible action scenes, my guess is that B99 looks slow-paced and low-budget by comparison."

Alan Sepinwall of HitFix wrote, "Still, glad to have the full cast together again, and to see the show navigate its way through what could have been a too-dark storyline, as even Sheriff Reynolds turns out okay after getting shot by Figgis, since he'll get a disability pension out of it." Andy Crump of Paste gave the episode a 7.9 and wrote, "It's funny, make no mistake, because Brooklyn Nine-Nine, even at its worst, is funny, but usually the series gives us something to hang onto, and 'Coral Palms, Pt. 3' lacks that. This, perhaps, is what happens when you squish an arc this substantial into only an hour of running time: Everything gets rushed, and in rushing the show trips and almost falls on its face."
