= Captain Latvia =

- Brooklyn Nine-Nine episode
- Episode no.: Season 4 Episode 10
- Directed by: Jaffar Mahmood
- Written by: Matt Lawton
- Cinematography by: Giovani Lampassi
- Editing by: Jeremy Reuben
- Production code: 410
- Original air date: December 13, 2016
- Running time: 22 minutes

Guest appearances
- Mary Lynn Rajskub as Genevieve Mirren-Carter; Lance Barber as Patrick

Episode chronology
← Previous "The Overmining"	Next → "The Fugitive"
- Brooklyn Nine-Nine season 4

"Captain Latvia" is the tenth episode of the fourth season of the American television police sitcom series Brooklyn Nine-Nine. It is the 78th overall episode of the series and is written by Matt Lawton and directed by Jaffar Mahmood. It aired on Fox in the United States on December 13, 2016.

The show revolves around the fictitious 99th precinct of the New York Police Department in Brooklyn and the officers and detectives that work in the precinct. In the episode, Jake and Boyle rush to find an imported toy for Nikolaj that has ties to the Latvian mob. Meanwhile, the precinct competes against the MTA in the annual Christmas singing competition.

The episode was seen by an estimated 2.15 million household viewers and gained a 0.9/4 ratings share among adults aged 18–49, according to Nielsen Media Research. The episode received mixed-to-positive reviews from critics, who praised Joe Lo Truglio's performance but the plotlines received criticism.

== Plot ==
In the cold open, Jake buys an inflatable tree for the break room, but it becomes too big and traps Terry inside, forcing him to crash through one of the windows to escape.

Boyle (Joe Lo Truglio) is determined to find an action figure, Captain Latvia, for Nikolaj (Antonio Raul Corbo) as a Christmas gift. However, the figure is from Latvia and is difficult to get. Despite having ordered it a month ago, the figure hasn't arrived.

Jake (Andy Samberg) decides to help Boyle in finding the toy. Confronting the owner of the shipping company, they find that the Latvian mob is behind it. Infiltrating a ring to get information, they steal a pad that can lead to the headquarters of the mob. Jake begins noting that Boyle is putting himself in danger for the toy and knocks him unconscious. After he awakens, Jake tells him that the best present he can give is being alive for his son. While Boyle leaves to be with Nikolaj, Jake leads a raid on the headquarters. He later shows up at Boyle's house to give Nikolaj another present: a police cop figure, which Nikolaj likens to Boyle.

Meanwhile, Holt (Andre Braugher) and the rest of the precinct compete against the MTA officers in an annual Christmas carol singing competition. They find that a perp, Patrick (Lance Barber), has a beautiful voice, and decide to include him in their group for the competition. Patrick has a panic attack and flees the stage. Finding him more open when drinking alcohol, they let him get drunk in order to overcome his stage fright and sing. However, the competition still doesn't work as he intentionally distorts the lyrics and insults New York. While the squad is smarting about their humiliation, Scully (Joel McKinnon Miller) says that the important thing about Christmas is being together as a family. At first they make fun of him but they later join him in singing carols outside Boyle's house.

== Reception ==
=== Viewers ===
In its original American broadcast, "Captain Latvia" was seen by an estimated 2.15 million household viewers and gained a 0.9/4 ratings share among adults aged 18–49, according to Nielsen Media Research. This was a slight decrease in viewership from the previous episode, which was watched by 2.31 million viewers with a 1.0/3 in the 18-49 demographics. This means that 0.9 percent of all households with televisions watched the episode, while 4 percent of all households watching television at that time watched it. With these ratings, Brooklyn Nine-Nine was the highest rated show on FOX for the night, beating Scream Queens and New Girl, fifth on its timeslot and ninth for the night, behind The Real O'Neals, Fresh Off the Boat, NCIS: New Orleans, Bull, American Housewife, The Middle, NCIS, and The Voice.

=== Critical reviews ===
"Captain Latvia" received mixed reviews from critics. LaToya Ferguson of The A.V. Club gave the episode a "C" grade and wrote, "For some ridiculous reason, Brooklyn Nine-Nine can't make every one of its Christmas episodes a Die Hard riff. So instead of another 'Yippie Kayak,' Brooklyn Nine-Nine's 'Captain Latvia' has goes with an A Good Day To Die Hard reference (which happens to be the ultimate comeback from Boyle) as part of what starts off like a Jingle All The Way take and ends up serving as the nightmare fuel of us versus them rhetoric between parents and non-parents."

Alan Sepinwall of Uproxx wrote, "'Captain Latvia' was an excellent Joe Lo Truglio spotlight, allowing Boyle to be simultaneously creepy and awesome in his pursuit of the perfect Christmas gift for poor Nikolaj, taking advantage of his musk, his flat butt, and everything else that will give Jake nightmares." Andy Crump of Paste gave the episode a 8.4 and wrote, "'Captain Latvia,' which is both Brooklyn Nine-Nine's requisite holiday episode as well as the capper on its brief mid-season break (sorry, suckers, but see you in 2017!), neither lingers on that particular joke nor carries it out to its full and obvious conclusion, but for a few, glorious seconds, Jake and Boyle give serious consideration to busting in on a warehouse full of gangsters in their boxers, guns blazing, flies fluttering, and the idea alone is just goofy enough to make us giggle."
