= Skyfire Cycle =

- Brooklyn Nine-Nine episode
- Episode no.: Season 4 Episode 8
- Directed by: Michael McDonald
- Written by: David Phillips
- Cinematography by: Giovani Lampassi
- Editing by: Jeremy Reuben
- Production code: 406
- Original air date: November 29, 2016
- Running time: 22:56 minutes

Guest appearances
- Marc Evan Jackson as Kevin Cozner; Eric Edelstein as Kurt Ovarp; Fred Melamed as D. C. Parlov

Episode chronology
← Previous "Mr. Santiago"	Next → "The Overmining"
- Brooklyn Nine-Nine season 4

"Skyfire Cycle" is the eighth episode of the fourth season of the American television police sitcom series Brooklyn Nine-Nine. It is the 76th overall episode of the series and is written by David Phillips and directed by Michael McDonald. It aired on Fox in the United States on November 29, 2016.

The show revolves around the police precinct which is commonly referred to as the 99th precinct of the New York Police Department in Brooklyn and the officers and detectives that work in the precinct. In the episode, Jake and Terry help D.C. Parlov, an author of a popular book series called the Skyfire Cycle, to find the person who sends him death threats. Meanwhile, Holt and Kevin get into a conflict about a math puzzle.

The episode was seen by an estimated 2.34 million household viewers and gained a 1.0/3 ratings share among adults aged 18–49, according to Nielsen Media Research. The episode received very positive reviews from critics, who praised the cold open, writing, and Terry Crews' performance in the episode.

== Plot ==
In the cold open, Jake takes advantage of the newly waxed floors from the night shift to attempt the "full bullpen", where he will slide from Holt's office to the elevator. He ends up sliding just as Holt arrives in the elevator, but despite his crash at the end, Holt and the rest celebrate his accomplishment.

Jake (Andy Samberg) finds out that a nearby precinct has been assigned a case involving a death threat against D. C. Parlov (Fred Melamed), author of the science fiction book series Skyfire Cycle. Terry (Terry Crews) reveals that he is a huge fan, and that as a child, Parlov sent him a book inscribed with an inspirational message that changed Terry's life. Jake arranges to get the case reassigned to the Nine-Nine so Terry can meet his hero.

Meanwhile, Holt (Andre Braugher) and Kevin (Marc Evan Jackson) are in the middle of a prolonged fight about the Monty Hall problem, and appeals to Amy (Melissa Fumero) and a reluctant Rosa (Stephanie Beatriz) for help. Amy sides with Kevin, causing Holt to lash out, and is keen to prove to Holt that he is wrong; Rosa, meanwhile, says that the real problem is the night shift has kept Holt and Kevin apart and they just need to have sex. Holt is outraged when Rosa openly states this to him, but the next day arrives in a chipper mood after having followed her advice.

Since her mother married Charles' father, Gina (Chelsea Peretti) is being forced to go on the annual Boyle family vacation. She suggests Aruba, but Charles is adamant that they will go to Iowa, as they do every year. Gina begins convincing the Boyles to change plans, which results in a Council of the Cousins who ultimately side with Gina. However, Charles is still ecstatic, as Gina has now learned more about the family and has become a Boyle.

While searching for suspects, Jake finds evidence that Parlov may have sent the threats to himself, as the handwriting on the threats and the inscription on Terry's book is the same. When they confront Parlov, he bluntly states that he didn't write the note; his ex-assistant, whom Parlov fired after having an affair with both his wife and his sister, did. This depresses Terry, but Jake assures him that he is still a hero and a role model for everyone in the precinct. They then track down and arrest the assistant.

== Reception ==
=== Viewers ===
In its original American broadcast, "Skyfire Cycle" was seen by an estimated 2.34 million household viewers and gained a 1.0/3 ratings share among adults aged 18–49, according to Nielsen Media Research. This was a 6% increase in viewership from the previous episode, which was watched by 2.19 million viewers with a 0.9/3 in the 18-49 demographics. This means that 1.0 percent of all households with televisions watched the episode, while 3 percent of all households watching television at that time watched it. With these ratings, Brooklyn Nine-Nine was the highest rated show on FOX for the night, beating Scream Queens and New Girl, sixth on its timeslot and eleventh for the night, behind The Real O'Neals, Fresh Off the Boat, a rerun of NCIS, The Flash, American Housewife, The Middle, Chicago Fire, The Voice, Rudolph the Red-Nosed Reindeer, and This Is Us.

=== Critical reviews ===
"Skyfire Cycle" received very positive reviews from critics. LaToya Ferguson of The A.V. Club gave the episode an "A" grade and wrote, "So something like Brooklyn Nine-Nine acknowledging that its lovable crew are still on the night shift feels like a big deal, even though it's technically just basic storytelling. Because the fact that they're still working night shift is a big deal; it affects the way they behave, the types of cases they get, and their relationship with their loved ones." Allie Pape from Vulture gave the show a 4 star rating out of 5 and wrote, "Sergeant Terry Jeffords is the closest thing the Nine-Nine has to a straight man, so he tends to get shafted in the plot shuffle. As Holt's character has gotten wackier with time, Terry has grown to be the primary voice nay-saying his co-workers' antics. Nonetheless, Terry Crews has proven himself to be one of the most eager-to-please comic actors I've ever seen, and he'll do just about anything for a laugh — from putting live animals on his head to busting through walls to flexing his pecs one at a time. It's always a pleasure to get a Terry-centric episode, few and far between as they may be, especially when it focuses on a preoccupation other than his wife and kids."

Alan Sepinwall of HitFix wrote, "That kind of predictability could have led to a flat episode, but instead it's emblematic of what's one of the season's best installments, if perhaps its least fancy. Nothing in 'Skyfire Cycle' tries to go outside the boundaries of what we've come to expect from Brooklyn Nine-Nine, but all of it's very well executed." Andy Crump of Paste gave the episode a 8.5 and wrote, "'Skyfire Cycle' is no different than 'Chocolate Milk,' or 'The Pontiac Bandit Returns,' except that, again, it features Holt in full bone mode (and later, Parlov, who we catch in the middle of a foursome with three young cosplaying women). Brooklyn Nine-Nine's quality is of a consistent standard. It's the individual jokes that make each chapter stand out, and sometimes, a man just has to get his bone on."
