= Monster in the Closet (Brooklyn Nine-Nine) =

- Brooklyn Nine-Nine episode
- Episode no.: Season 4 Episode 6
- Directed by: Nisha Ganatra
- Written by: Andrew Guest
- Cinematography by: Giovani Lampassi
- Editing by: Jason Gill
- Production code: 407
- Original air date: November 15, 2016
- Running time: 22 minutes

Guest appearances
- Jason Mantzoukas as Adrian Pimento; Tara Karsian as Mara Ciprioni

Episode chronology
← Previous "Halloween IV"	Next → "Mr. Santiago"
- Brooklyn Nine-Nine season 4

"Monster in the Closet" is the sixth episode of the fourth season of the American television police sitcom series Brooklyn Nine-Nine. It is the 74th overall episode of the series and is written by Andrew Guest and directed by Nisha Ganatra. It aired on Fox in the United States on November 15, 2016.

The show revolves around the fictitious 99th precinct of the New York Police Department in Brooklyn and the officers and detectives that work in the precinct. In the episode, Adrian returns from protection and he and Rosa decide to get married the next day. While Jake and Gina go with Adrian for a familiar possession, Amy finds problems at planning the wedding.

The episode was seen by an estimated 2.18 million household viewers and gained a 1/3 ratings share among adults aged 18–49, according to Nielsen Media Research. The episode received positive reviews from critics, who praised the cast's performances.

== Plot ==
Boyle (Joe Lo Truglio) finds Adrian (Jason Mantzoukas) in his son's closet and brings him to the precinct. Adrian then explains that he was in an Uzbek prison after fleeing New York but managed to escape. After meeting with Rosa (Stephanie Beatriz), the decision is made to resume the wedding that day.

While Amy (Melissa Fumero) stays to work on the wedding, Jake and Gina (Chelsea Peretti) accompany Adrian to retrieve his grandmother's earrings from a pawn shop. However, they discover the shop has been burned down, which Adrian sees as a sign from the universe that they shouldn't marry. The trio manage to find the shop owner and go to her house. The owner denies having the earrings but Pimento figures out she burned the pawn shop and kept the merchandise, they steal the earrings back by climbing through a window into their house. On the way back to the wedding, their car breaks down, which Adrian sees as another omen. However, they manage to get to the wedding by taking a plane with Pimento flying.

At the bar where the wedding will take place, Amy finds that Rosa is drunk. Despite the help of Boyle and Terry (Terry Crews), everyone, including Holt (Andre Braugher), gets drunk, with Holt upset that his balloon arch won't get used on the wedding. With the help of Hitchcock (Dirk Blocker) and Scully (Joel McKinnon Miller), Amy sprays them with fire extinguishers to help them sober up. As the wedding is about to start, Jake and Amy note that neither Rosa nor Adrian want to wed. After talking with them, Rosa and Adrian decide to cancel the wedding preferring instead to go on a date first.

== Reception ==
=== Viewers ===
In its original American broadcast, "Monster in the Closet" was seen by an estimated 2.18 million household viewers and gained a 0.9/3 ratings share among adults aged 18–49, according to Nielsen Media Research. This was a slight increase in viewership from the previous episode, which was watched by 2.05 million viewers with a 0.9/3 in the 18-49 demographics. This means that 0.9 percent of all households with televisions watched the episode, while 3 percent of all households watching television at that time watched it. With these ratings, Brooklyn Nine-Nine was the second highest rated show on FOX for the night, beating Scream Queens but behind New Girl, seventh on its timeslot and fourteenth for the night, behind New Girl, The Real O'Neals, The Flash, NCIS: New Orleans, Fresh Off the Boat, Chicago Fire, Bull, David Blaine: Beyond Magic, American Housewife, The Middle, NCIS, The Voice, and This Is Us.

=== Critical reviews ===
"Monster in the Closet" received positive reviews from critics. LaToya Ferguson of The A.V. Club gave the episode a "B+" grade and wrote, "'Monster In The Closet' has a lot in common with 'Halloween IV,' as it is another episode that truly taps into the characters' tunnel vision when they become task-oriented (no matter how relatively small the task). Only, this time, the tunnel vision is ultimately for a good cause, with very minimal backstabbing and insulting." Allie Pape from Vulture gave the show a perfect 5 star rating out of 5 and wrote, "'Monster in the Closet' is one of the funniest Brooklyn Nine-Nine episodes has ever done. The show has loosened up considerably this season, and it's fun to see it try new things and play outside the box. In previous years, even a Rosa wedding episode would have had a heavy spotlight on Jake, but this episode is built to highlight B99's ensemble appeal, which is where it shines brightest. The result feels snappy, well-directed, and razor-sharp."

Alan Sepinwall of HitFix wrote, "The rest of 'Monster in the Closet' was more of a mixed bag. Amy's dream of getting to organize a wedding in less than 24 hours, and the way it turned into a nightmare as everyone but Scully and Hitchcock proved to be incompetent and/or drunk, provided good material for Melissa Fumero and a lot of the cast." Andy Crump of Paste gave the episode a 9.2 and wrote, "It's like looking at the Bizarro World version of the 9-9: Amy is a savage, Scully and Hitchcock are useful, Rosa is coming undone at the seams, Holt is petty, and Jake is an unwitting vessel for the universe. Fair enough. The results work, and besides, they're hilarious, which is all anyone wants out of Brooklyn Nine-Nine. 'Monster in the Closet' winds up the threads of the Figgis story arc and reunites Rosa and Adrian, but more than that it lobs nothing but beautiful, joking perfection at us from start to finish."
