= The Night Shift (Brooklyn Nine-Nine) =

- Brooklyn Nine-Nine episode
- Episode no.: Season 4 Episode 4
- Directed by: Tristram Shapeero
- Written by: Matt Murray
- Cinematography by: Giovani Lampassi
- Editing by: Jeremy Reuben
- Production code: 404
- Original air date: October 11, 2016
- Running time: 22 minutes

Guest appearances
- Zooey Deschanel as Jess Day; Matt Walsh as Lohank

Episode chronology
← Previous "Coral Palms"	Next → "Halloween IV"
- Brooklyn Nine-Nine season 4

"The Night Shift" is the fourth episode of the fourth season of the American television police sitcom series Brooklyn Nine-Nine. It is the 72nd overall episode of the series and is written by Matt Murray and directed by Tristram Shapeero. It aired on Fox in the United States on October 11, 2016.

The show revolves around the fictitious 99th precinct of the New York Police Department in Brooklyn and the officers and detectives that work in the precinct. In the episode, the squad is in a bad mood after being assigned to the night shift. Jake and Boyle decide to track a thief but Jake finds that Boyle's son is stopping him from participating with him. Meanwhile, Amy tries to find what Rosa is hiding while Holt tries to cheer the precinct. The episode crosses over with New Girl's episode, "Homecoming".

The episode was seen by an estimated 2.13 million household viewers and gained a 0.9/3 ratings share among adults aged 18–49, according to Nielsen Media Research. The episode received generally positive reviews from critics, who praised the writing as well as the performances. However, the crossover received more criticism, with some expressing disappointment.

== Plot ==
In the cold open, the squad forces Jake to remove his frosted tips he had in Florida. Jake attempts to resist, but upon seeing Boyle attempt the same hairstyle, he agrees it looks bad and allows them to shave it off.

The squad is in a bad mood due to being assigned to the night shift, with Jake being the only optimistic one as he's excited to go back to work. He manages to convince Boyle (Joe Lo Truglio) to work on the case of a thief that robbed a jewelry store.

Jake and Boyle learn that during the night shift, many of their assistance services are not available, making it much more difficult to find the thief. When their shift is over, Boyle leaves to take care of his son, Nikolaj (Antonio Raul Corbo), which disappoints Jake as he tries to catch the thief alone. The thief is discovered in a house but gets away from Jake, who is walking with a cane (due to events in the previous episode). Jake then commandeers a "crossover SUV" being driven by Jess Day (Zooey Deschanel), but ends up crashing the vehicle. After getting advice from Detective Lohank (Matt Walsh), Jake explains his worries to Boyle and both make up, and Boyle lets Jake play with Nikolaj.

Meanwhile, noting the pessimistic environment, Holt (Andre Braugher) decides to help the precinct lift their spirits with many methods, such as making them smile, forcing laughs and throwing a dull party. After Holt expresses that he also hates the night shift, the squad decides to make a better effort in showing their support. Also, Amy (Melissa Fumero) finds Rosa (Stephanie Beatriz) spends time at a bench in the park instead of going to the restroom and making Amy finish the paperwork. After confronting her, Rosa reveals that she was waiting on the bench for Adrian to come back. Amy apologizes for her attitude and agrees to help Rosa with her paperwork.

== Reception ==
=== Viewers ===
In its original American broadcast, "The Night Shift" was seen by an estimated 2.13 million household viewers and gained a 0.9/3 ratings share among adults aged 18–49, according to Nielsen Media Research. This was a 12% decrease in viewership from the previous episode, which was watched by 2.40 million viewers with a 1.0/4 in the 18-49 demographics. This means that 0.9 percent of all households with televisions watched the episode, while 3 percent of all households watching television at that time watched it. With these ratings, Brooklyn Nine-Nine was the highest rated show on Fox for the night, beating New Girl, sixth on its timeslot and thirteenth for the night, behind Agents of S.H.I.E.L.D., The Flash, The Real O'Neals, NCIS: New Orleans, Fresh Off the Boat, Bull, The Middle, Chicago Fire, NCIS, American Housewife, The Voice, and This Is Us.

=== Critical reviews ===
"The Night Shift" received generally positive reviews from critics. LaToya Ferguson of The A.V. Club gave the episode an "A−" grade and wrote, "But then something funny happens: The show doesn't allow the crossover gimmick to stop it from being a 'real' episode of Brooklyn Nine-Nine. Even with the crossover beat — and really, it's just a beat — 'The Night Shift' is actually the most typical episode of Brooklyn Nine-Nine's fourth season so far, which is quite the pleasant return to form for the season." Ben Travers of IndieWire gave the episode a "B+" and wrote, "Logistical issues aside, there's no reason this unnecessary crossover couldn't have been better — for New Girl. While the safe play of restricting crossover characters in the first half-hour helped Brooklyn Nine-Nine maintain its integrity, and New Girl was overweighted with incorporating too many synergy-satisfying stories, the scenes blending both series could have at least acknowledged their best combinations. Though no one was begging to see New Girl mix with Brooklyn, that doesn't mean it lacked potential."

Dan Snierson of Entertainment Weekly wrote, "The first three episodes of Brooklyn Nine-Nine's fourth season stashed Jake and Holt in Florida, where they entertainingly served as fish out of water (with Holt playing the straight man, literally). Tuesday's episode, the fourth, finally released the two men back into their natural environment — the Nine-Nine precinct — yet they found themselves swimming in unfamiliar territory once again." Allie Pape from Vulture gave the show a perfect 5 star rating out of 5 and wrote, "This episode is definitely a strong start. The punishment of being moved to the night shift is a twist that affects all of the characters in the same place, which gives it a little more punch than last season, when just Holt and Gina were exiled."

Alan Sepinwall of HitFix wrote, "I still think there are some character combinations across the two series that would make a full-throated crossover really entertaining. This, unfortunately, had the feeling of something handed down by the network that the respective creative teams tried to do their best with." Andy Crump of Paste gave the episode a 8.0 and wrote, "Not that this is the kind of show to do a deep tissue examination of its substance, but the fact that 'The Night Shift' takes the Figgis situation seriously instead of breezing by it says a lot about Brooklyn Nine-Nine's integrity as a narrative. More important, though, is how well 'The Night Shift' plays as a standalone entry in the series' canon despite its function as connective tissue for a New Girl collaboration. If the temporary merger proves totally unnecessary, it at least doesn't mar 'The Night Shift's overall quality."
