= Cop-Con =

- Brooklyn Nine-Nine episode
- Episode no.: Season 4 Episode 17
- Directed by: Giovani Lampassi
- Written by: Andy Gosche
- Cinematography by: Giovani Lampassi
- Editing by: Jeremy Reuben
- Production code: 416
- Original air date: May 9, 2017
- Running time: 22 minutes

Guest appearances
- Audrey Wasilewski as Cindy Shatz; Andy Daly as Jeffrey Bouché

Episode chronology
← Previous "Moo Moo"	Next → "Chasing Amy"
- Brooklyn Nine-Nine season 4

"Cop-Con" is the seventeenth episode of the fourth season of the American television police sitcom series Brooklyn Nine-Nine and the 85th overall episode of the series. The episode was written by Andy Gosche and directed by Giovani Lampassi. It aired on Fox in the United States on May 9, 2017, back-to-back with the next episode "Chasing Amy".

The show revolves around the fictitious 99th precinct of the New York Police Department in Brooklyn and the officers and detectives that work in the precinct. In the episode, the precinct travels to Rochester, New York for a police convention, where their captain Raymond Holt (Andre Braugher) is to give a presentation. Against Holt's orders, the rest of the squad throws a party, and Sergeant Terrence Jeffords (Terry Crews) loses Holt's laptop, which Holt had given to him to work on the presentation. Meanwhile, Gina Linetti (Chelsea Peretti) and Amy Santiago (Melissa Fumero) help Norm Scully (Joel McKinnon Miller) ask out a woman with whom he fell in love.

The episode was seen by an estimated 1.61 million household viewers and gained a 0.6/2 ratings share among adults aged 18–49, according to Nielsen Media Research. The episode received positive reviews from critics, who praised the cold open and the cast's performances.

== Plot ==
In the cold open, Jake finds Hitchcock asleep in the break room and attempts to prank him by putting his hand in a bowl of warm water, but almost accidentally drowns him when Hitchcock ends up putting his face in the bowl. Holt (Andre Braugher) announces that the precinct will be attending a convention for cops in Rochester, New York. While the squad is excited to party, Holt states that they're going so Holt can run for a position on a NYPD group.

At the hotel's reception, Holt finds his rival Jeffrey Bouché (Andy Daly), who seemingly is a kind person, is running for the position too. While Holt is signing in, the gang check out the tech demonstration, which includes the Wasp, a device that emits a frequency only people 35 and under can hear, which is painful to Rosa but Jake and Charles pretend to be affected since they're over 35.

While waiting for the next day for a presentation to the board of directors, Jake (Andy Samberg) and the gang prepare to go to a party that some of the attendees have hosted, only to learn it stopped since the cops throwing it were arrested for accepting bribes. Jake decides to take over and throw the party for the squad and the other officers. He has a robot from the tech demonstration monitor Holt's movement while the rest of the squad and the other precincts party in a hotel room. Holt arrives at the room and hands them a laptop with the presentation so Terry (Terry Crews) can add color, and they manage to avoid him seeing the party.

The next day, as the crew suffers from a hangover, Holt comes over for his laptop and Jake fails to distract him, then Terry says that the laptop is missing. They buy time by saying Terry should add transitions and Jake then has Rosa (Stephanie Beatriz) distract Holt by having him go to a gym.

Gina (Chelsea Peretti) and Amy (Melissa Fumero) find that Scully (Joel McKinnon Miller) has fallen in love with someone in the convention, Cindy (Audrey Wasilewski). They help him gain confidence but she does not like him like that. When Amy and Gina try to get Cindy to give Scully another chance, she states she hates confident people and likes people who are weird. When Scully acts as himself, they kiss.

After getting clues from last night, Jake, Terry and Boyle (Joe Lo Truglio) find the laptop and give it to Holt. However, the slides were replaced by images of them at the party, orchestrated by Jeffrey. Holt leaves angrily but then explains to Jake that he was disappointed that he wasn't invited and felt left out. The squad decides to make it up by taking him to a thermometer museum he previously expressed interest in.

== Reception ==
=== Viewers ===
In its original American broadcast, "Cop-Con" was seen by an estimated 1.61 million household viewers and gained a 0.6/2 ratings share among adults aged 18–49, according to Nielsen Media Research. This was slight decrease in viewership from the previous episode, which was watched by 1.72 million viewers with a 0.6/3 in the 18-49 demographics. This means that 0.6 percent of all households with televisions watched the episode, while 2 percent of all households watching television at that time watched it. With these ratings, Brooklyn Nine-Nine was the second highest rated show on FOX for the night, behind Prison Break, sixth on its timeslot and fifteenth for the night, behind Agents of S.H.I.E.L.D., two episodes of Great News, Prison Break, Imaginary Mary, The Flash, Fresh Off the Boat, NCIS: New Orleans, American Housewife, The Middle, Chicago Fire, Bull, NCIS, and The Voice.

=== Critical reviews ===
"Cop-Con" received positive reviews from critics. LaToya Ferguson of The A.V. Club gave the episode a "B" grade and wrote, "'Cop-Con' is a getaway episode for the crew, but it's one that still exists within the confines of policehood. Sort of. The idea of Cop-Con as an excuse to party is classic Nine-Nine, but as far as this annual event we're just now seeing goes, it's rather nice to see the show acknowledge a convention like this."

Alan Sepinwall of Uproxx wrote, "'Cop-Con' was your big ensemble piece, with all the characters in the same place, and mostly involved in the same story. (Though Amy and Gina branched off to assist in a rare Scully-centric subplot.) A spiritual sequel to season two's 'Beach House,' it both gave us another chance to see the detectives to cut loose away from work, and to see the one area of tension that still exists between them and their otherwise beloved captain." Andy Crump of Paste gave the episode a 7.6 and wrote, "'Cop-Con' builds up to an unexpected swerve in its credit sequence, and spends the bulk of its time letting Jake, Terry and Boyle be detectives in a Hangover-style scenario; meanwhile, 'Chasing Amy' has Jake and Rosa pursuing Amy as Holt and Terry bicker over model trains and Gina and Boyle squabble over family heirlooms, which, being the heirlooms of the Boyle clan, are incredibly strange."
