= The Fugitive (Brooklyn Nine-Nine) =

- Brooklyn Nine-Nine episodes
- Episode nos.: Season 4 Episodes 11-12
- Directed by: Rebecca Asher (Pt. 1); Ryan Case (Pt. 2)
- Written by: Carol Kolb (Pt.1); Justin Noble; Jessica Polonsky (Pt. 2)
- Cinematography by: Giovani Lampassi
- Editing by: Jason Gill (Pt. 1); Jeremy Reuben
- Production code: 411-412
- Original air date: January 1, 2017
- Running time: 44 minutes

Guest appearances
- Pt. 1: Craig Robinson as Doug Judy; Marshawn Lynch as himself; Pt. 2: Craig Robinson as Doug Judy; Charles Baker as George Judy

Episode chronology
← Previous "Captain Latvia"	Next → "The Audit"
- Brooklyn Nine-Nine season 4

"The Fugitive" is the eleventh and twelfth episodes of the fourth season of the American television police sitcom series Brooklyn Nine-Nine. It is the 79th and 80th overall episodes of the series. "Part 1" is written by Carol Kolb and directed by Rebecca Asher while "Part 2" is written by Justin Noble & Jessica Polonsky and directed by Ryan Case. It aired on Fox in the United States on January 1, 2017.

The show revolves around the fictitious 99th precinct of the New York Police Department in Brooklyn and the officers and detectives that work in the precinct. In the episodes, a prison van carrying prisoners crashes and the prisoners escape, forcing the precinct to go into a manhunt to catch them, with Jake having to turn to an unlikely source to get more information on one of the inmates.

The episodes was seen by an estimated 3.49 million household viewers and gained a 1.3/4 ratings share among adults aged 18–49, according to Nielsen Media Research. The episodes received generally positive reviews from critics, who praised the cast performances and the ending, although the tone and pace of the episodes were more criticized.

== Plot ==
=== Part 1 ===
During a prison transfer, the bus carrying the prisoners crashes and 9 inmates escape the van, an event that Marshawn Lynch fails to see. This leads the 99th precinct to begin a manhunt on the inmates. Jake (Andy Samberg) and Amy (Melissa Fumero), who have been discussing moving in together, see this as an opportunity for a bet and decide that whoever catches the most prisoners, the loser will move to the winner's apartment.

While Holt (Andre Braugher) and Rosa (Stephanie Beatriz) work on getting a foreign woman to give information, Jake works with Terry (Terry Crews) on a part of the city while Amy works with Boyle (Joe Lo Truglio) on the other part. While Jake and Terry catch an inmate, Amy and Boyle catch three prisoners thanks to thermographic cameras, giving them a 3–1 lead. However, Jake and Terry use DHS equipment to catch another 3 inmates, giving them a 4–3 lead. While following an inmate, Terry is held at knifepoint by one of the inmates but is then arrested by Amy, bringing the score 4-4.

Holt and Rosa finally manage to identify the location of the final suspect and leads the teams to the sewers. In the sewers, they catch the inmate at the same time, but Jake decides to hand him over to Amy, as he wants her to be happy and agrees to move in with her. However, the inmate isn't the one they're looking for, as he was forced to fake the convict's identity as a decoy. When they are given the identity of the real inmate, Jake decides to contact the inmate's foster brother: Doug Judy (Craig Robinson).

=== Part 2 ===
Jake decides to give Judy immunity for all his past crimes in exchange for his help catching the remaining fugitive, much to Holt's dismay. Judy leads Jake and Holt to an event where his ex-foster brother George (Charles Baker) is planning to rob an expensive item. Meanwhile, Boyle (Joe Lo Truglio) complains that he has been left out of the group's text chain. After teaching him the proper use of messages, Amy and Gina (Chelsea Peretti) let him in. Meanwhile, Terry and Rosa work to figure out how George managed to escape a hospital without being seen, where Terry begins feeling older and slowly worries about how he is declining with age. Eventually, Rosa helps him figure out how the escape happened, which restores his confidence.

During the investigation, Jake and Judy continue bonding, which causes more problems for Holt as Judy identifies himself as a cop and even carries a gun. At the event, George is not revealed to steal the item, but steals the participants' cars, including Holt's car. They go to a chop shop where the cars are being held. Holt finds his car getting dismantled and he and Jake follow George. However, George is saved by Judy, who flees with him in a stolen car, disappointing both Jake and Holt.

Finding a lead on the location of George, Jake and Holt arrive at their house but are then held at gunpoint by Judy and George. George's gun is revealed not to be loaded and is knocked down by Judy, who faked his allegiance in order to catch him. George is arrested and the ADA grants Judy immunity for his crimes, clearing him, with Judy giving Holt a new car which is the same make, model, and color of his stolen car. At the end of the episode, Boyle continues with the proper use of texts, sending one to Gina on the street. However, while Gina reads it, she's hit by a bus.

== Reception ==
=== Viewers ===
In its original American broadcast, "The Fugitive" was seen by an estimated 3.49 million household viewers and gained a 1.3/4 ratings share among adults aged 18–49, according to Nielsen Media Research. This was a 62% increase in viewership from the previous episode, which was watched by 2.15 million viewers with a 0.9/4 in the 18-49 demographics. This means that 1.3 percent of all households with televisions watched the episode, while 4 percent of all households watching television at that time watched it. With these ratings, Brooklyn Nine-Nine was the third highest rated show on FOX for the night, behind The Mick and The OT, third on its timeslot and fifth for the night, behind 60 Minutes, The Mick, The OT, and NBC Sunday Night Football.

=== Critical reviews ===
"The Fugitive" received generally positive reviews from critics. LaToya Ferguson of The A.V. Club gave the first part a "B−" grade and the second part an "A−" grade and wrote, "Part two going with such a low stakes subplot here actually makes the conclusion to the episode work even better, because there's no way anyone saw this coming: Gina gets hit by a bus, after giving Boyle positive reinforcement. It's so out of left field for Brooklyn Nine-Nine, but it's also a hell of a way for the show to go out in its winter finale. And in a time where things are pretty much settled and calm in the Nine-Nine, there's room for some shake-ups. In this case, it just happens to be at Gina's expense. This first half of Brooklyn Nine-Nine's fourth season has been pretty inconsistent so far, but at least it's going out on a high note."

Alan Sepinwall of Uproxx wrote, "'The Fugitive' will be the last we see of Brooklyn until sometime this spring — give or take a new series tanking so badly that Fox needs to replace it immediately — and while it's a bummer the show is going away right as it's in the midst of one of its funniest stretches ever, I'm glad it goes out on as a high a note as these two episodes." Andy Crump of Paste gave the episode a 7.8 and wrote, "As with most lesser Brooklyn Nine-Nine episodes, any Brooklyn Nine-Nine is good Brooklyn Nine-Nine. Funny though they may be, neither installment of 'The Fugitive' ultimately complements the other, and the lack of narrative unity suggests that the series would have done better by reshaping them as standalone episodes."
