= The Slaughterhouse (Brooklyn Nine-Nine) =

- Brooklyn Nine-Nine episode
- Episode no.: Season 4 Episode 20
- Directed by: Victor Nelli Jr.
- Written by: Neil Campbell
- Cinematography by: Giovani Lampassi
- Editing by: Jeremy Reuben
- Production code: 420
- Original air date: May 16, 2017
- Running time: 22 minutes

Guest appearances
- Gina Gershon as Lieutenant Melanie Hawkins

Episode chronology
| ← Previous "Your Honor" | Next → "The Bank Job" |
- Brooklyn Nine-Nine season 4

"The Slaughterhouse" is the twentieth episode of the fourth season of the American television police sitcom series Brooklyn Nine-Nine and the 88th overall episode of the series. The episode was written by Neil Campbell and directed by Victor Nelli Jr. It aired on Fox in the United States on May 16, 2017, back-to-back with the previous episode "Your Honor".

The show revolves around the fictitious 99th precinct of the New York Police Department in Brooklyn and the officers and detectives that work in the precinct. In the episode, Detectives Jake Peralta (Andy Samberg) and Rosa Diaz (Stephanie Beatriz) compete in order to get a place in Lieutenant Melanie Hawkins' (Gina Gershon) task force, which ends up affecting their friendship. Meanwhile, Captain Raymond Holt (Andre Braugher) tries to get a reluctant Amy Santiago (Melissa Fumero) to express anger with him when he loses her favorite pen. Meanwhile, Michael Hitchcock (Dirk Blocker) is constantly fighting with Norm Scully (Joel McKinnon Miller), stemming from Scully beginning to choose his new girlfriend over him.

The episode was seen by an estimated 1.38 million household viewers and gained a 0.6/3 ratings share among adults aged 18–49, according to Nielsen Media Research. The episode received mostly positive reviews from critics, who praised the cast performance and the build-up to the season finale, although Hitchcock and Scully's subplot received a mixed response.

== Plot ==
Jake (Andy Samberg) and Rosa (Stephanie Beatriz) are following a bank robber, Billy Ocampo (Dutch Johnson) in a warehouse. They try to catch him and his men but Ocampo escapes. The rest of the henchmen turn out to be undercover officers working for Lieutenant Melanie Hawkins (Gina Gershon), who is angry with them for messing up the operation.

Jake and Rosa apologize to Hawkins for the mishandling but she is impressed by their abilities and she offers one of them a place in her task force, The Slaughterhouse. Despite agreeing not to compete, Jake and Rosa eventually turn against each other and try to catch Ocampo by any means, even sabotaging each other. Eventually, they find Ocampo in a building and Jake arrests him. Jake intends to get credit but Rosa tells him that she wanted to work on a task force led by a woman for once, making Jake decide to give her the credit. Hawkins is impressed by their loyalty and allows both to enter her task force. However, Jake overhears Hawkins talking with Ocampo, finding that she is a collaborator with him.

Meanwhile, Holt (Andre Braugher) accidentally loses Amy's (Melissa Fumero) pen, which she considers very precious. When she does not seem to be bothered by it, he decides to help her express her anger when confronted. After failed attempts, she manages to let her feelings out regarding the pen, pleasing Holt. Also, Hitchcock (Dirk Blocker) and Scully (Joel McKinnon Miller) fight over Scully's new girlfriend interfering in their friendship. Terry (Terry Crews) and Boyle (Joe Lo Truglio) try to help them, to no success. Eventually, Gina (Chelsea Peretti) manages to reconcile them, by treating them "like animals".

== Reception ==
=== Viewers ===
In its original American broadcast, "The Slaughterhouse" was seen by an estimated 1.38 million household viewers and gained a 0.6/3 ratings share among adults aged 18–49, according to Nielsen Media Research. This was 17% decrease in viewership from the previous episode, which was watched by 1.65 million viewers with a 0.7/3 in the 18-49 demographics. This means that 0.6 percent of all households with televisions watched the episode, while 3 percent of all households watching television at that time watched it. With these ratings, Brooklyn Nine-Nine was the second highest rated show on FOX for the night, behind Prison Break, sixth on its timeslot and fifteenth for the night, behind two episodes of Great News, Agents of S.H.I.E.L.D., Prison Break, Imaginary Mary, The Flash, Fresh Off the Boat, NCIS: New Orleans, American Housewife, The Middle, Chicago Fire, Bull, NCIS, and The Voice.

=== Critical reviews ===
"The Slaughterhouse" received mostly positive reviews from critics. LaToya Ferguson of The A.V. Club gave the episode a "B+" grade and wrote, "I don't want to say Brooklyn Nine-Nine so much telegraphs its dirty cop reveal with Hawkins... But general sitcom and television tropes do. Besides the unlimited supply of leather jacket ensembles in The Slaughterhouse, the general grizzled 'super cop' concept lends itself to revealing an untrustworthy character. Brooklyn Nine-Nine already subverted that particular expectation in 'Det. Dave Majors,' so it was overdue with Lieutenant Hawkins, unfortunately. Still, the contrast of the bright and cheery Nine-Nine world with the grittiness of The Slaughterhouse and all its nameless team members work for this episode, and Jake and Rosa make perfect sense as the two detectives with the biggest aspirations to enter this world (going into the end of the season)."

Alan Sepinwall of Uproxx wrote, "'The Slaughterhouse,' meanwhile, introduced Gina Gershon as legendary NYPD badass Melanie Hawkins, who would appear to be this year's final big bad. Having Jake and/or Rosa join her squad full-time might have been a status quo shakeup too many in a season that's had a lot of them, especially since we know everyone will eventually wind up back at the Nine-Nine, but having their competition turn out to be moot because Hawkins is dirty and needs to be taken down neatly sidesteps that problem." Alexis Gunderson of Paste gave the episode a 8.4 and wrote, "Seeing how firmly they have each other's back when decision time comes, that gives hope for the last two Season Four episodes next week, which, if the cliffhanger in 'The Slaughterhouse' is any indication, will actually make sense as a doubleheader."
