= Halloween IV (Brooklyn Nine-Nine) =

- Brooklyn Nine-Nine episode
- Episode no.: Season 4 Episode 5
- Directed by: Claire Scanlon
- Written by: Phil Augusta Jackson
- Cinematography by: Giovani Lampassi
- Editing by: Jason Gill
- Production code: 405
- Original air date: October 18, 2016
- Running time: 22 minutes

Guest appearance
- Winston Story as Bill

Episode chronology
← Previous "The Night Shift"	Next → "Monster in the Closet"
- Brooklyn Nine-Nine season 4

"Halloween IV" is the fifth episode of the fourth season of the American television police sitcom series Brooklyn Nine-Nine. It is the 73rd overall episode of the series and is written by Phil Augusta Jackson and directed by Claire Scanlon. It aired on Fox in the United States on October 18, 2016.

The show revolves around the fictitious 99th precinct of the New York Police Department in Brooklyn and the officers and detectives that work in the precinct. In the episode, it's the fourth annual Halloween Heist in the 99th precinct and Jake, Holt and Amy compete for the "Ultimate Detective/Genius" plaque.

The episode was seen by an estimated 2.05 million household viewers and gained a 0.9/3 ratings share among adults aged 18–49, according to Nielsen Media Research. The episode received critical acclaim from critics, who praised the writing, performances and the episode's ability to be unpredictable.

== Plot ==
It's the fourth Halloween heist and Jake (Andy Samberg), Holt (Andre Braugher) and Amy (Melissa Fumero) are competing for the "Ultimate Detective/Genius" plaque. This time, they will work with someone in the precinct. Holt selects Boyle (Joe Lo Truglio), knowing Jake relies on him; Amy selects Rosa (Stephanie Beatriz); and Jake selects Gina (Chelsea Peretti).

Terry (Terry Crews) decides not to participate in the heist, citing paperwork. Feeling suspicious, Jake has Hitchcock (Dirk Blocker) and Scully (Joel McKinnon Miller) follow him. With the help of Gina, Jake locks everyone and manages to steal the plaque, handing it to Gina. However, Gina gets hurt while rollerskating and is sent home but the plaque returns to its original position. Using many pizza delivery people, Amy and Rosa manage to steal the plaque and put it in an air vent.

Holt brings Cheddar to track the plaque and finds it in the vent. Jake manages to get Boyle to tell him the location and retrieves the plaque. However, Holt and Amy show that they have their own plaques as well. The lights suddenly go off to reveal the words "Heists are dumb" on the plaques and, since Terry is the only one who often says "Dumb" in the precinct, they confront Terry, accusing him of being the one with the plaque. Gina reveals herself to be the mastermind of the heist, citing that getting the "Detective" status amended is her goal. She is subsequently named "Ultimate Human/Genius".

== Reception ==
=== Viewers ===
In its original American broadcast, "Halloween IV" was seen by an estimated 2.05 million household viewers and gained a 0.9/3 ratings share among adults aged 18–49, according to Nielsen Media Research. This was a slight decrease in viewership from the previous episode, which was watched by 2.13 million viewers with a 0.9/3 in the 18-49 demographics. This means that 0.9 percent of all households with televisions watched the episode, while 3 percent of all households watching television at that time watched television. With these ratings, Brooklyn Nine-Nine was the highest rated show on FOX for the night, beating Scream Queens, New Girl, sixth on its timeslot and twelfth for the night, behind The Real O'Neals, The Flash, NCIS: New Orleans, Fresh Off the Boat, The Middle, Chicago Fire, Bull, American Housewife, NCIS, The Voice, and This Is Us.

=== Critical reviews ===
"Halloween IV" received critical acclaim from critics. LaToya Ferguson of The A.V. Club gave the episode an "A" grade and wrote, "'Halloween IV' is so overwhelmingly funny — in a way where every character has something to do, which Brooklyn Nine-Nine can sometimes have trouble with — that it takes hold of all the audience's (and characters') sensibilities for the 20-plus minutes of action."

Dan Snierson of Entertainment Weekly wrote, "After three episodes of the witness-protection program in Florida and one episode of night duty, Brooklyn Nine-Nine returned to its comfort zone with something familiar and unpredictable: the annual, zany, twist-upon-reversal-upon-fake-out Halloween heist episode." Allie Pape from Vulture gave the show a 4 star rating out of 5 and wrote, "Sadly, it looks like all the extra budget that went into the Florida episodes and last week's car-studded New Girl crossover has finally dried up, because 'Halloween IV' is strictly limited to the walls of the precinct, a small canvas for what's supposed to be an elaborate series of tricks."

Alan Sepinwall of HitFix wrote, "Still, 'Halloween IV' had its comic moments: the guys' increasingly loud announcements after Amy tried to do a quiet one for Scully's sake, Holt's weird pronunciation of 'kaboodle,' Jake's growing unease around the creepy Boyle body double, to name a few. And even if a part of me is annoyed that the game is now open to all the characters, hearing Gina give her big victory speech with a pronounced lisp due to her missing front teeth was fun." Andy Crump of Paste gave the episode a 8.8 and wrote, "It's one thing to be obvious. It's another thing to be boring. If there's a single word that we can use to describe Brooklyn Nine-Nine's fourth season, it's 'predictable,' and anybody who keeps up with Paste's weekly recaps probably saw this one coming from a mile away. Let's get more specific than that, though, because the same applies precisely to Brooklyn Nine-Nine's annual Halloween antics, too: Every year since the show's first season, the precinct's ongoing contest to crown the ultimate detective/genius telegraphs its outcome more and more, sapping the thrill of good old fashioned guesswork from both the contest and the episodes staged around it."

== See also ==
- Halloween (Brooklyn Nine-Nine)
- Halloween II (Brooklyn Nine-Nine)
- Halloween III (Brooklyn Nine-Nine)
