= Serve & Protect =

- Brooklyn Nine-Nine episode
- Episode no.: Season 4 Episode 14
- Directed by: Michael Schur
- Written by: Andrew Guest; Alexis Wilkinson
- Cinematography by: Giovani Lampassi
- Editing by: Jeremy Reuben
- Production code: 414
- Original air date: April 18, 2017
- Running time: 22 minutes

Guest appearances
- Nathan Fillion as Mark Devereaux; Kimberly Hébert Gregory as Veronica Hopkins; Greg Germann as Gary Lurmax; Kelly Sullivan as Cassie Sinclair

Episode chronology
← Previous "The Audit"	Next → "The Last Ride"
- Brooklyn Nine-Nine season 4

"Serve & Protect" is the fourteenth episode of the fourth season of the American television police sitcom series Brooklyn Nine-Nine and the 82nd overall episode of the series. The episode was written by Andrew Guest & Alexis Wilkinson and directed by co-creator Michael Schur. It aired on Fox in the United States on April 18, 2017.

The show revolves around the fictitious 99th precinct of the New York Police Department in Brooklyn and the officers and detectives that work in the precinct. In the episode, Jake and Rosa investigate the case where a laptop was stolen on the set of their favorite show Serve & Protect; which clouds Jake's judgment. Meanwhile, Holt and Boyle resort to blackmail in order to avoid getting the precinct shut down; while Gina and Amy try to see why Terry angered Veronica.

The episode was seen by an estimated 1.91 million household viewers and gained a 0.7/3 ratings share among adults aged 18–49, according to Nielsen Media Research. The episode received positive reviews from critics, who praised the writing and Fillion's guest performance.

== Plot ==
While the precinct is still undergoing the audit, Jake (Andy Samberg) and Rosa (Stephanie Beatriz) are assigned a case where a laptop belonging to star actress Cassie Sinclair (Kelly Sullivan) was stolen on the set of the crime show Serve & Protect; their favorite show.

On the set, Jake is enthralled with the producers. Executive producer Gary Lurmax (Greg Germann) offers him a consulting producer role in the show, with Jake accepting the offer and ruling out Lurmax as a suspect in his enthusiasm. Rosa believes the latter to be clouding her partner's judgement. Jake and Rosa also have to deal with actor Mark Devereaux (Nathan Fillion), an avid method actor who perpetually stays in-character as a dramatised detective and contaminates evidence with his fingerprints. Rosa finds evidence that Lurmax stole the computer by checking footage of him breaking into Sinclair's RV; she and Jake confront him. However, Lurmax explains that he broke into it because Sinclair was experiencing an addiction to painkillers - he was stealing the pills to help her recover. Jake attempts to salvage his position as consulting producer and Rosa repents on the spot, but Lurmax rejects their efforts. While discussing the case, Rosa admits that she fears the two of them will not be friends anymore if the precinct shuts down, but Jake reassures her that will not happen. Later, they arrest Devereaux, finding the laptop in his car and deducing that he stole it to humiliate Sinclair; whose character was going to have her own spin-off show. Days later, the show creates the "Jake Peralta" character in retaliation: a pervert who is shot multiple times by Sinclair's character. Despite the negative portrayal of himself, the real Jake is still enthusiastic that they named a character after him.

Meanwhile, fearing that Veronica (Kimberly Hébert Gregory) will use her revenge for the audit, Holt (Andre Braugher) and Boyle (Joe Lo Truglio) decide to blackmail Deputy Commissioner Grayson (Steven M. Gagnon) after seeing him with his mistress. However, at the last minute, they decide that they're breaking their own morals and leave. Gina (Chelsea Peretti) and Amy (Melissa Fumero) interrogate Terry (Terry Crews) to find why he drove Veronica mad. Despite Terry saying he was nice throughout, they eventually figure out that Terry intended to break up with her over a year before the break-up occurred but stayed in the relationship out of pity after her mother died. He apologizes to her, and asks her not to forgive him but not to punish the precinct. She accepts the apology but admits that she already sent a bad report about the precinct.

== Reception ==
=== Viewers ===
In its original American broadcast, "Serve & Protect" was seen by an estimated 1.91 million household viewers and gained a 0.7/3 ratings share among adults aged 18–49, according to Nielsen Media Research. This was steady in viewership from the previous episode, which was watched by 1.91 million viewers with a 0.7/3 in the 18-49 demographics. This means that 0.7 percent of all households with televisions watched the episode, while 3 percent of all households watching television at that time watched it. With these ratings, Brooklyn Nine-Nine was the second highest rated show on FOX for the night, behind Prison Break, fifth on its timeslot and thirteenth for the night, behind two episodes of Trial & Error, Agents of S.H.I.E.L.D., Imaginary Mary, Prison Break, Fresh Off the Boat, NCIS: New Orleans, Bull, American Housewife, The Middle, NCIS, and The Voice.

=== Critical reviews ===
"Serve & Protect" received positive reviews from critics. LaToya Ferguson of The A.V. Club gave the episode a "B+" grade and wrote, "The immediate reminder of Veronica Hopkins' personal vendetta against the Nine-Nine isn't a good opening look for the episode though. But it at least ends up being an outlier for the episode, as 'Serve & Protect' isn't just 'The Audit, Part Two.' In fact, this episode steps away from the shenanigans of 'The Audit,' though it's still focused on the Nine-Nine preventing a gross abuse of authority."

Alan Sepinwall of Uproxx wrote, "It's odd: Nathan Fillion's TV career essentially began with the sitcom Two Guys, A Girl and a Pizza Place, where he was a late addition to the cast and very quickly became that show's go-to player, and his two most famous roles on Firefly and Castle drew heavily on his ability to be funny in a dramatic context. Yet when he's popped up on sitcoms lately, they haven't really known what to do with him(*). Community largely wasted both of his appearances as Greendale's head custodian, and this episode of Brooklyn Nine-Nine doesn't seem to have an idea beyond getting him to spoof his role on Castle." Andy Crump of Paste gave the episode a 8.1 and wrote, "The result is still a solid half-hour of sitcom fare with an emotional coda about the other thing that Brooklyn Nine-Nine does really well: Character relationships. Coming from Rosa, an admission of fear that the end of the 9-9 would mean the end of her friendship with Jake is a huge deal, and this, most likely, is why their story enjoys prime real estate in 'Serve and Protect.' It’d just be nice if a little more of that real estate could have been ceded to the other characters, too. (At least the credit sequence is worth all the build-up.)"
