= The Bank Job (Brooklyn Nine-Nine) =

- Brooklyn Nine-Nine episode
- Episode no.: Season 4 Episode 21
- Directed by: Matthew Nodella
- Written by: Carol Kolb
- Cinematography by: Giovani Lampassi
- Editing by: Jason Gill
- Production code: 421
- Original air date: May 23, 2017
- Running time: 22 minutes

Guest appearances
- Jason Mantzoukas as Adrian Pimento; Gina Gershon as Melanie Hawkins; Ryan Phillippe as Milton Boyle

Episode chronology
| ← Previous "The Slaughterhouse" | Next → "Crime and Punishment" |
- Brooklyn Nine-Nine season 4

"The Bank Job" is the twenty-first episode of the fourth season of the American television police sitcom series Brooklyn Nine-Nine and the 89th overall episode of the series. The episode was written by Carol Kolb and directed by Matthew Nodella. It aired on Fox in the United States on May 23, 2017, back-to-back with the next episode "Crime and Punishment".

The show revolves around the fictitious 99th precinct of the New York Police Department in Brooklyn and the officers and detectives that work in the precinct. In the episode, Jake and Rosa try to earn Hawkins' trust by joining her gang of bank robbers, asking for Adrian Pimento's help. Meanwhile, the squad find out that Gina is pregnant and try to deduce who the father is.

The episode was seen by an estimated 1.78 million household viewers and gained a 0.7/3 ratings share among adults aged 18–49, according to Nielsen Media Research. The episode received generally positive reviews from critics, who praised the writing and the build-up to the season finale.

== Plot ==
Jake (Andy Samberg) and Rosa (Stephanie Beatriz) inform Holt (Andre Braugher) about Hawkins (Gina Gershon) and her corrupt business with the bank robbers. Due to a lack of evidence, they decide to recruit Adrian Pimento (Jason Mantzoukas) for help.

Amy (Melissa Fumero), Boyle (Joe Lo Truglio) and Terry (Terry Crews) note that Gina (Chelsea Peretti) regularly gets out of the precinct and deduce she's pregnant. After confronting her, she admits she is but due a non-disclosure agreement, she won't reveal the father. They find that she is lying and ask again who the father is. Boyle finds out that the father is his cousin, Milton (Ryan Phillippe), much to his annoyance, as he considers Milton the worst in his family.

Adrian tells Jake and Rosa that they have to punch him to show they can be corrupt as Hawkins. They punch him in the slaughterhouse, but some of their conversation is filmed on camera. They find Hawkins destroyed the file and asks them to go for drinks that night. Using fake cocaine made out of vitamin B powder, Jake and Rosa join Hawkins and her gang that night and drink alcohol. The next morning, while hungover, they participate in a bank robbery, to which Jake sends Holt the address. Jake, Rosa and Hawkins' force arrives at the bank. The 99th precinct officers arrive at the bank that Jake sent to Holt, only to find out that it is the wrong bank. Officers arrive at the bank that Hawkins, Jake, and Rosa are at, and arrest Jake and Rosa. Hawkins deems herself to be undercover and gets away.

== Reception ==
=== Viewers ===
In its original American broadcast, "The Bank Job" was seen by an estimated 1.78 million household viewers and gained a 0.7/3 ratings share among adults aged 18–49, according to Nielsen Media Research. This was 28% increase in viewership from the previous episode, which was watched by 1.38 million viewers with a 0.6/3 in the 18-49 demographics. This means that 0.7 percent of all households with televisions watched the episode, while 3 percent of all households watching television at that time watched it. With these ratings, Brooklyn Nine-Nine was the second highest rated show on FOX for the night, behind Prison Break, seventh on its timeslot and tenth for the night, behind two episodes of Great News, Prison Break, a rerun of NCIS, Downward Dog, The Flash, Bull, Dancing with the Stars, and The Voice.

=== Critical reviews ===
"The Bank Job" received generally positive reviews from critics. LaToya Ferguson of The A.V. Club gave the episode a "C+" grade and wrote, "With 'The Bank Job,' the biggest problem with this new story focus isn't even the story itself: It's that pesky Brooklyn Nine-Nine trap where everyone else barely exists as functional characters until it's time for them to interact with the A-plot, if that time ever even comes. Here, Holt at least has his role as Jake and Rosa's undercover lifeline, but a cold open razzmatazz aerobics class and a clandestine car wash meeting aren't exactly good enough uses of the character or Andre Braugher's talents and time."

Alan Sepinwall of Uproxx wrote, "Brooklyn Nine-Nine has been one of TV's most reliably funny and happy sitcoms for its entire run, but the fourth season — which concluded tonight with yet another big cliffhanger — was the show's best and most consistent so far." Alexis Gunderson of Paste gave the episode a 8.9 and wrote, "Sitcoms live and die by their baked-in reset buttons: Whatever fiasco sweeps the protagonists up in the first 20 minutes of an episode always resolves in the last two, their version of reality returning to normal just in time for the next episode's quippy cold open."
