= The Overmining =

- Brooklyn Nine-Nine episode
- Episode no.: Season 4 Episode 9
- Directed by: Dean Holland
- Written by: Luke Del Tredici
- Cinematography by: Giovani Lampassi
- Editing by: Jason Gill
- Production code: 409
- Original air date: December 6, 2016
- Running time: 22 minutes

Guest appearances
- Ken Marino as Jason "C.J." Stentley

Episode chronology
← Previous "Skyfire Cycle"	Next → "Captain Latvia"
- Brooklyn Nine-Nine season 4

"The Overmining" is the ninth episode of the fourth season of the American television police sitcom series Brooklyn Nine-Nine. It is the 77th overall episode of the series and is written by Luke Del Tredici and directed by Dean Holland. It aired on Fox in the United States on December 6, 2016.

The show revolves around the fictitious 99th precinct of the New York Police Department in Brooklyn and the officers and detectives that work in the precinct. In the episode, Jake and Holt help C.J. in retrieving evidence he lost, in an attempt to get the precinct back to the day shift. Meanwhile, Rosa and Boyle enjoy massages in a spa but find the place to be more corrupt. Also, Terry fights Gina so she can get rid of her space heaters.

The episode was seen by an estimated 2.31 million household viewers and gained a 1.0/4 ratings share among adults aged 18–49, according to Nielsen Media Research. The episode received mixed-to-positive reviews from critics, who praised the performances but the characterization received more criticism.

== Plot ==
In the cold open, Boyle causes some awkward silence between him and Jake by making a joke about Diane Wiest.

Still on the night shift, Jake (Andy Samberg) and Holt (Andre Braugher) find that C.J. (Ken Marino) lost evidence on a drug case when someone stole it due to C.J. leaving it unattended. This delights Jake, as this could get C.J. demoted so Holt and the crew can return to the day shift. However, Holt tells Jake they'll help C.J. to retrieve it.

Jake meets with C.J. and finds that due to losing the evidence, his transfer to the police academy has been denied. Jake then decides to help him. While Jake and Holt confront a dealer in his hideout, C.J. remains in a van. However, after blowing their cover for his constant chattering on their headsets, they arrest the dealer. Later, Jake and Holt lead a raid on the drug operation where the leader flees, but C.J. knocks him over by accident by opening his car door. For his service, C.J. is awarded the Medal of Honor but states his intention to remain with the precinct. Holt calls reporters to ask him questions at the award ceremony, which he messes up. Holt is subsequently renamed Captain and the squad goes back to the day shift.

Meanwhile, Boyle (Joe Lo Truglio) convinces Rosa (Stephanie Beatriz) to go to a foot massage in a spa to calm their stress of being on the night shift. Much to her surprise, she enjoys the massage. However, they find that the spa is used as a money laundering operation. Despite expressing interest in letting the spa stay, they arrest the culprits. Also, Terry (Terry Crews), after failing his Lieutenant exam, wants the precinct to reduce the energy consumption but Gina (Chelsea Peretti) challenges him by having multiple space heaters on her desk. Amy confronts Gina about her behavior, and Gina reveals that she knows about the exam, and wants to help him regain his confidence by drawing the situation out for him to win. Eventually, Terry manages to get her to take out the heaters when he gives a heater to Hitchcock (Dirk Blocker).

== Reception ==
=== Viewers ===
In its original American broadcast, "The Overmining" was seen by an estimated 2.31 million household viewers and gained a 1.0/4 ratings share among adults aged 18–49, according to Nielsen Media Research. This was a slight decrease in viewership from the previous episode, which was watched by 2.34 million viewers with a 1.0/3 in the 18-49 demographics. This means that 1.0 percent of all households with televisions watched the episode, while 4 percent of all households watching television at that time watched it. With these ratings, Brooklyn Nine-Nine was the highest rated show on FOX for the night, beating Scream Queens and New Girl, sixth on its timeslot and eleventh for the night, behind Fresh Off the Boat, The Flash, NCIS: New Orleans, American Housewife, The Middle, Bull, Chicago Fire, NCIS, The Voice, and This Is Us.

=== Critical reviews ===
"The Overmining" received mixed-to-positive reviews from critics. LaToya Ferguson of The A.V. Club gave the episode a "C" grade and wrote, "The rest of 'The Overmining' goes for simple too, but it unfortunately ends up going forth in a way that leaves far too much open-ended. Instead of causing the question of 'don't you people have jobs,' it becomes one of how competent any of them really are at their jobs."

Alan Sepinwall of HitFix wrote, "There are times when it becomes very easy to take this show — midway through its fourth season, no longer shiny and new — for granted as sitcom comfort food. But when it gets on a roll like the one we've seen since the squad came back from Florida, and the show went back to episodic storytelling, few shows on TV give me more pleasure, or make me laugh harder." Andy Crump of Paste gave the episode a 7.2 and wrote, "So 'The Overmining' justifies itself without much trouble, but more thought directed toward narrative mechanics would have guaranteed it classic status. If you're writing for a show and you're churning out twentyish episodes each season, you're going to stumble, but it's a puzzle that what feels like the firmest (and clearest) structure for 'The Overmining' is bypassed in favor of a standard sitcom blueprint."
