= Crime and Punishment (Brooklyn Nine-Nine) =

- Brooklyn Nine-Nine episode
- Episode no.: Season 4 Episode 22
- Directed by: Dan Goor
- Written by: Justin Noble; Jessica Polonsky
- Cinematography by: Giovani Lampassi
- Editing by: Cortney Carrillo; Jeremy Reuben
- Production code: 422
- Original air date: May 23, 2017
- Running time: 22 minutes

Guest appearances
- Gina Gershon as Melanie Hawkins; Brent Briscoe as Matthew Langdon; Scott Aukerman as Glandis; Eugene Cordero as Pandemic; Kulap Vilaysack as Nightmare

Episode chronology
← Previous "The Bank Job"	Next → "The Big House"
- Brooklyn Nine-Nine season 4

"Crime and Punishment" is the twenty-second episode and season finale of the fourth season of the American television police sitcom series Brooklyn Nine-Nine and the 90th overall episode of the series. The episode was written by Justin Noble & Jessica Polonsky and directed by series co-creator Dan Goor. It aired on Fox in the United States on May 23, 2017, back-to-back with the previous episode "The Bank Job".

The show revolves around the fictitious 99th precinct of the New York Police Department in Brooklyn and the officers and detectives that work in the precinct. In the episode, Jake and Rosa stand trial after being falsely framed for the bank robbery. Jake finds a witness that could help them on the case and races with Amy to find him.

The episode was seen by an estimated 1.50 million household viewers and gained a 0.6/2 ratings share among adults aged 18–49, according to Nielsen Media Research. The episode received positive reviews from critics, who praised the writing, performances and the twists.

== Plot ==
Two months have passed since Jake (Andy Samberg) and Rosa (Stephanie Beatriz) were framed for the bank robbery, and they are now heading to trial. Due to a lack of evidence against Hawkins, as well as the 9-9's investigation being off the books, the chances that they are found guilty are very high. They are also accused of hiding money in Cayman Islands bank accounts.

With one last day to get evidence, the squad finds a name related to Hawkins: Matthew Langdon (Brent Briscoe), in Pennsylvania. While Terry (Terry Crews) and Boyle (Joe Lo Truglio) find a hacker to find the database to the bank accounts, Jake and Amy (Melissa Fumero) visit Langdon at his farm. He explains that he worked with Hawkins years ago and discovered her corruption, for which she threatened his life if he did not flee. While initially unwilling to participate, he decides to help them.

Rosa decides not to waste her time and decides to flee with Adrian to a ranch, but Holt (Andre Braugher) convinces her to stay and not leave her "family". In the trial, Jake brings Langdon to testify against Hawkins. However, Terry and Boyle find too late that Langdon was the one who sent the money to the bank accounts. Langdon commits perjury at the trial by falsely testifying against Jake and Rosa. After consideration, the jury finds Jake and Rosa guilty.

== Reception ==
=== Viewers ===
In its original American broadcast, "Crime and Punishment" was seen by an estimated 1.50 million household viewers and gained a 0.6/2 ratings share among adults aged 18–49, according to Nielsen Media Research. This was 16% decrease in viewership from the previous episode, which was watched by 1.78 million viewers with a 0.7/3 in the 18-49 demographics. This means that 0.6 percent of all households with televisions watched the episode, while 2 percent of all households watching television at that time watched it. With these ratings, Brooklyn Nine-Nine was the second highest rated show on FOX for the night, behind Prison Break, seventh on its timeslot and tenth for the night, behind two episodes of Great News, Prison Break, a rerun of NCIS, Downward Dog, The Flash, Bull, Dancing with the Stars, and The Voice.

=== Critical reviews ===
"Crime and Punishment" received positive reviews from critics. LaToya Ferguson of The A.V. Club gave the episode a "B" grade and wrote, "And it's a really risky choice on Brooklyn Nine-Nine's part. I've written before about how the series can have trouble creating stakes that actually come across as 'real' stakes, and now we have a choice that can really affect the show moving forward. Is it good? Is it bad? I honestly have no idea at this point. It's big, but big can mean so many things. We'll just have to wait and see. Wait, rewatch, and see."

Alan Sepinwall of Uproxx wrote, "Brooklyn Nine-Nine has been one of TV's most reliably funny and happy sitcoms for its entire run, but the fourth season — which concluded tonight with yet another big cliffhanger — was the show's best and most consistent so far." Alexis Gunderson of Paste gave the episode a 8.9 and wrote, "The twists within the twists that lead to Jake and Rosa being found (spoiler) guilty are also surprising, a bit of bait-and-switch that might have been obvious had I been in a procedural headspace looking for twists, but caught me by surprise for being tucked into Brooklyn Nine-Nine."
