= The Last Ride (Brooklyn Nine-Nine) =

- Brooklyn Nine-Nine episode
- Episode no.: Season 4 Episode 15
- Directed by: Linda Mendoza
- Written by: David Phillips
- Cinematography by: Giovani Lampassi
- Editing by: Jason Gill
- Production code: 415
- Original air date: April 25, 2017
- Running time: 22 minutes

Episode chronology
← Previous "Serve & Protect"	Next → "Moo Moo"
- Brooklyn Nine-Nine season 4

"The Last Ride" is the fifteenth episode of the fourth season of the American television police sitcom series Brooklyn Nine-Nine and the 83rd overall episode of the series. The episode was written by David Phillips and directed by Linda Mendoza. It aired on Fox in the United States on April 25, 2017.

The show revolves around the fictitious 99th precinct of the New York Police Department in Brooklyn and the officers and detectives that work in the precinct. In the episode, with a few hours left for the precinct's fate in the balance, Jake and Boyle work to investigate a stolen bicycle that turns out to be a part of a large drug case. Meanwhile, Terry tries to solve a case to catch up to Hitchcock's record while Holt gets Amy through 5 years of mentorship.

The episode was seen by an estimated 1.88 million household viewers and gained 0.7/3 ratings share among adults aged 18–49, according to Nielsen Media Research. The episode received very positive reviews from critics, who praised the writing, performances and emotionality of the episode.

== Plot ==
Captain Holt (Andre Braugher) announces to the precinct that the audit has both the 99th and 74th precincts as the most likely to be shut down, with their own being the prime candidate. Unless the precinct is handed in particular cases, their chances are running out.

With the only case left being that of a stolen bicycle, Jake (Andy Samberg) and Boyle (Joe Lo Truglio) go to investigate. Determined to make their last case the "coolest case ever", they equip their dream gear and find that the case is even bigger than expected as someone stole it to handle a package of heroin. Meeting with the dealers, Jake fakes being one of the candidates to deliver it. Competing with another bicyclist, Jake loses the race but Boyle puts a GPS on the bicycle to find the meeting. Using tactical equipment, they watch the meeting and consider arresting everyone present to save the precinct. However, they decide this goes against their code, and decide to wait for the supplier to show for the arrest, even after it goes past the deadline.

Meanwhile, Holt is convinced by Amy (Melissa Fumero) to speed through five years of (strenuously planned) mentorship before the precinct closes. He manages to teach her, although it only manages to cover a part of the whole mentorship. While Gina (Chelsea Peretti) pulls pranks on the precinct for her live audience, Terry (Terry Crews) finds that he needs to solve a case to surpass Hitchcock (Dirk Blocker) for most solved cases. Terry investigates when a man has his phone stolen, but Hitchcock solves it by finding he broke it on purpose and filed a false report. Rosa (Stephanie Beatriz) then shows him that as he helped everyone in the precinct, he already solved the most cases in the history of the 99th. Holt then announces that the precinct is not getting shut down, thanks to Gina's audience calling the Commissioner after she live-streamed Holt's heartfelt speech to the precinct. Amy is disappointed that all of Holt's remaining teachings have been delivered in a day, but when Holt informs her that it was only the "first volume" of mentorship, she is ecstatic.

== Reception ==
=== Viewers ===
In its original American broadcast, "The Last Ride" was seen by an estimated 1.88 million household viewers and gained a 0.7/3 ratings share among adults aged 18–49, according to Nielsen Media Research. This was slight decrease in viewership from the previous episode, which was watched by 1.91 million viewers with a 0.7/3 in the 18-49 demographics. This means that 0.7 percent of all households with televisions watched the episode, while 3 percent of all households watching television at that time watched it. With these ratings, Brooklyn Nine-Nine was the third highest rated show on FOX for the night, behind The Mick and Prison Break, seventh on its timeslot and sixteenth for the night, behind Agents of S.H.I.E.L.D., 48 Hours: NCIS, a rerun of NCIS, a rerun of Speechless, Imaginary Mary, a rerun of American Housewife, a rerun of The Middle, a rerun of Bull, The Mick, Prison Break, The Flash, two episodes of Great News, Chicago Fire, and The Voice.

=== Critical reviews ===
"The Last Ride" received very positive reviews from critics. LaToya Ferguson of The A.V. Club gave the episode a "B+" grade and wrote, "While Brooklyn Nine-Nine has gone through with big (albeit temporary) shifts in the status quo like new captains and witness protection, those changes were easier to accept than the very idea of the Nine-Nine being shut down. The lead-up to finding out which precinct will be closed has relied on more of a suspension of disbelief than is usually acceptable when it comes to Brooklyn Nine-Nine, but like with a lot of the series' arcs, it’s what it does with the finish that truly matters."

Alan Sepinwall of Uproxx wrote, "But while the two previous episodes in this mini-arc had their ups and downs, 'The Last Ride' was a lot of fun because it used this bogus cliffhanger to essentially do a series finale in miniature: an episode where Jake, Charles, Holt, Amy, Gina, and the rest of the group all think this is their last day working together, and act accordingly." Andy Crump of Paste gave the episode a 8.7 and wrote, "But as much as we laugh, we feel the feels more, even if we can guess the shape of the episode's climax without consulting our old high school geometry textbooks. Brooklyn Nine-Nine is a sitcom through and through, but as ever, its emphasis on characters above all else is what makes it stand out."
