= Pontiac Bandit =

- Brooklyn Nine-Nine episode
- Episode no.: Season 1 Episode 12
- Directed by: Craig Zisk
- Written by: Norm Hiscock: Lakshmi Sundaram
- Cinematography by: Giovani Lampassi
- Editing by: Cortney Carrillo
- Production code: 113
- Original air date: January 7, 2014
- Running time: 22 minutes

Guest appearances
- Craig Robinson as Doug Judy; Dirk Blocker as Michael Hitchcock; Joel McKinnon Miller as Norm Scully; Armelia McQueen as Diane

Episode chronology
← Previous "Christmas"	Next → "The Bet"
- Brooklyn Nine-Nine season 1

"Pontiac Bandit" is the twelfth episode of the first season of the American television police sitcom series Brooklyn Nine-Nine. It was written by series writers Norm Hiscock & Lakshmi Sundaram and directed by Craig Zisk. It aired on Fox in the United States on January 7, 2014. It was the thirteenth episode to be produced but the twelfth to be broadcast.

In this episode, Peralta and Rosa Diaz (Stephanie Beatriz) pursue a criminal known as the "Pontiac Bandit" with the help from an identity thief. Meanwhile, Charles Boyle (Joe Lo Truglio) tries to adjust to the precinct after recovering from his injury. Furthermore, Holt tries to get a home for two puppies. The episode was seen by an estimated 3.44 million household viewers and gained a 1.5/4 ratings share among adults aged 18–49, according to Nielsen Media Research. The episode received mostly positive reviews from critics, who praised Robinson's guest performance as the "Pontiac Bandit".

== Plot ==
Charles Boyle (Joe Lo Truglio) returns to the precinct in a scooter after recovering from being shot.

Rosa Diaz (Stephanie Beatriz) introduces Jake Peralta (Andy Samberg) to an identity thief, Doug Judy (Craig Robinson). Judy has information regarding the "Pontiac Bandit," a criminal Peralta has been seeking for a long time. Judy arranges a meeting with the Bandit and agrees to wear a wire under police surveillance. However, Judy fails to give the police a pre-arranged sign and they raid the place. They initially believe that the "Pontiac Bandit" is Judy's barber (London Kim). However, when cornering him, Judy calls them and reveals that he is the real Pontiac Bandit. Moreover, he is able to stage his own escape with the help of an accomplice.

Raymond Holt (Andre Braugher) tries to find a home for two puppies from his neighbor's dog, but most of the squad members are unable to take them in. Meanwhile, the rest of the precinct is struggling to get used to an injured Boyle. One by one each of them moves their work to the records room until they are discovered by Holt, who reprimands them for how they're treating Boyle. Boyle decides to return home until he is better and Holt gives him the puppies to keep him company.

== Reception ==
=== Viewers ===
In its original American broadcast, "Pontiac Bandit" was seen by an estimated 3.44 million household viewers and gained a 1.5/4 ratings share among adults aged 18–49, according to Nielsen Media Research. This was a 7% decrease in viewership from the previous episode, which was watched by 3.66 million viewers with a 1.6/5 in the 18-49 demographics. This means that 1.5 percent of all households with televisions watched the episode, while 4 percent of all households watching television at that time watched it. With these ratings, Brooklyn Nine-Nine was the second most watched show on FOX for the night, beating Dads and The Mindy Project but behind New Girl, third on its timeslot and ninth for the night in the 18-49 demographics, behind New Girl, The Goldbergs, The Biggest Loser, Chicago Fire, Person of Interest, Agents of S.H.I.E.L.D., Intelligence, and NCIS.

=== Critical reviews ===
"Pontiac Bandit" received mostly positive reviews from critics. Roth Cornet of IGN gave the episode a "great" 8.8 out of 10 and wrote, "Brooklyn Nine-Nine returned with an episode that was firing on all cylinders. The show has truly hit its stride as it heads into the second half of its freshman season."

Molly Eichel of The A.V. Club gave the episode a "B+" grade and wrote, "Brooklyn Nine-Nine returns from its winter hiatus with the sheen of its Golden Globe nominations. The show itself got a best comedy/musical nod, and Andy Samberg can now forever be known as 'Golden Globe nominee' in the best comedic actor category. Even as someone with genuine affection for the show, I saw the noms and thought, 'Really?' I fully believe in the bull-shittiness of awards in general, but the recognition for Brooklyn Nine-Nine was still a surprise."

Alan Sepinwall of HitFix wrote, "The story that provides 'Pontiac Bandit' with its title was of a type I've been hoping Brooklyn would do away with for a while, as Jake again screws up for failing to listen to some clearly wise advice. But it was also so funny, and made such good use of every single member of the ensemble, plus guest star Craig Robinson, that I ultimately didn't mind that much." Aaron Channon of Paste gave the episode a 7.0 out of 10 and wrote, "'Pontiac Bandit,' despite the presence of the great Craig Robinson, is one of Brooklyn Nine-Nine's weakest episodes. The best-case scenario is that, because of Peralta's lone failure, Doug Judy will become a recurring character whose sole purpose is to torment Peralta with his flirtatious bromantic ways and elusiveness."
