= Mr. Santiago =

- Brooklyn Nine-Nine episode
- Episode no.: Season 4 Episode 7
- Directed by: Alex Reid
- Written by: Neil Campbell
- Cinematography by: Giovani Lampassi
- Editing by: Jeremy Reuben
- Production code: 408
- Original air date: November 22, 2016
- Running time: 22 minutes

Guest appearances
- Jason Mantzoukas as Adrian Pimento; Jimmy Smits as Victor Santiago

Episode chronology
← Previous "Monster in the Closet"	Next → "Skyfire Cycle"
- Brooklyn Nine-Nine season 4

"Mr. Santiago" is the seventh episode of the fourth season of the American television police sitcom series Brooklyn Nine-Nine. It is the 75th overall episode of the series and is written by Neil Campbell and directed by Alex Reid. It aired on Fox in the United States on November 22, 2016.

The show revolves around the fictitious 99th precinct of the New York Police Department in Brooklyn and the officers and detectives that work in the precinct. In the episode, Jake intends to bond with Amy's dad during Thanksgiving dinner. They then decide to work on an old case that he couldn't solve 20 years ago. Meanwhile, the gang has a discussion regarding killing a turkey to eat it while Holt gives Adrian money for a license, although he uses it for different purposes.

The episode was seen by an estimated 2.19 million household viewers and gained a 0.9/3 ratings share among adults aged 18–49, according to Nielsen Media Research. The episode received mixed-to-positive reviews from critics, who praised the cast's performances but the storylines and Gina's character received more criticism.

== Plot ==
In the cold open, the squad members try to predict how Holt would react to eating a marshmallow. Boyle ends up being the closest by correctly guessing he would giggle in a high-pitched voice.

It's Thanksgiving and it's Amy's (Melissa Fumero) turn in hosting the dinner at her house, for which she invited her father Victor (Jimmy Smits), a retired cop. Intending to impress him, Jake (Andy Samberg) reveals to Terry (Terry Crews) that he orchestrated a binder that has his interests.

Jake picks Victor up from the airport and begins bonding with him. However, Victor finds the binder but states that he likes Jake, to which he reveals he has an unsolved 20-year old case that Jake could solve. They decide to find the culprit of a bank robbery and confront members of a family. However, the members prove they weren't in the bank at the time and they reveal that Victor already knew they were innocent. As they leave, Victor then tells Jake that he also has a binder with Jake's data and states that he doesn't like him for his attitude, deeming him not right for Amy. They then call Amy on the phone, who reprimands both of them for thinking she needs her father's approval for whoever she dates. Their discussion with Amy ultimately allows them to solve the case by proving the daughter of the family committed the robbery. This gets Victor's respect for Jake.

While they solve the case, the rest of the squad work on the dinner. Due to a lack of turkeys in the market, they're forced to get a real turkey, which Boyle (Joe Lo Truglio) will behead. After Rosa (Stephanie Beatriz) and Gina (Chelsea Peretti) fight to keep it alive, the turkey turns aggressive and locks them in the bathroom. Boyle manages to calm him with food, although he ends up injured. Meanwhile, Holt (Andre Braugher) gives Adrian (Jason Mantzoukas) a $2000 loan to get a private investigator license. However, Adrian decides to spend it to bet on a televised dog show, infuriating Holt, who threatens to sue him. Despite Holt's worries, Adrian's dog wins, earning him $70,000.

== Reception ==
=== Viewers ===
In its original American broadcast, "Mr. Santiago" was seen by an estimated 2.19 million household viewers and gained a 0.9/3 ratings share among adults aged 18–49, according to Nielsen Media Research. This was a slight increase in viewership from the previous episode, which was watched by 2.18 million viewers with a 0.9/3 in the 18-49 demographics. This means that 0.9 percent of all households with televisions watched the episode, while 3 percent of all households watching television at that time watched it. With these ratings, Brooklyn Nine-Nine was the highest rated show on FOX for the night, beating Scream Queens and New Girl, sixth on its timeslot and tenth for the night, behind The Flash, NCIS: New Orleans, American Housewife, Chicago Fire, Bull, The Middle, The Voice, Dancing with the Stars, NCIS, and This Is Us.

=== Critical reviews ===
"Mr. Santiago" received mixed-to-positive reviews from critics. LaToya Ferguson of The A.V. Club gave the episode a "C+" grade and wrote, "So 'Mr. Santiago' hits that mandatory holiday episode designation hard this week, complete with wild, live turkey and disapproving father shenanigans. Unsurprisingly, the Brooklyn Nine-Nine cast (and guest stars Jimmy Smits and Jason Mantzoukas) is more than up for the 'challenge' of hitting all of these episode's somewhat tired beats, but even with its brief moments of zagging where the episode would typically zig, 'Mr. Santiago' isn't an especially hilarious or out there episode of Brooklyn Nine-Nine." Allie Pape from Vulture gave the show a 4 star rating out of 5 and wrote, "The idea of a Thanksgiving episode based on actual conflict around the Thanksgiving table has become somewhat passé in recent years. (Sitcom writers would prefer you save that problem for your own life.) Perhaps that's why this is only Brooklyn Nine-Nine's second Thanksgiving episode in four seasons. 'Mr. Santiago' returns to Amy's apartment — the scene of the last Thanksgiving episode — where it quickly finds ways to get the characters out of the traditional dinner confines, sending most of them out of the house altogether."

Alan Sepinwall of HitFix wrote, "Brooklyn tends to be at its best when it allows its characters to be as smart as possible (well, everyone but Scully and Hitchcock), and also when it sidesteps dumb sitcom cliches, so to have Mr. Santiago be two steps ahead of Jake the entire time — and then for Jake in turn to prove smart enough to actually solve the case that Victor never could — proved far more satisfying than if there had just been a big misunderstanding based on the original binder." Andy Crump of Paste gave the episode a 8.2 and wrote, "'Mr. Santiago' glosses over opportunities for sweetness in character development — the accord Victor and Jake reach at the end is one of mutual respect mixed with mutual love for Amy — but it's suitably loopy and never less than hysterical. (Psychotic Amy is the best Amy. Her thirst for blood outmatches even Boyle's.)"
