= Brooklyn Nine-Nine season 4 =

Brooklyn Nine-Nine
- Season 4
- DVD cover
- Starring: Andy Samberg; Stephanie Beatriz; Terry Crews; Melissa Fumero; Joe Lo Truglio; Chelsea Peretti; Andre Braugher; Dirk Blocker; Joel McKinnon Miller
- No. of episodes: 22

Release
- Original network: Fox
- Original release: September 20, 2016 – May 23, 2017

Season chronology
- ← Previous; Season 3 Next → Season 5

The fourth season of the television sitcom Brooklyn Nine-Nine premiered September 20, 2016 on Fox and ended May 23, 2017 with 22 episodes.

== Summary ==
Jake and Holt are placed in Florida as part of the witness protection program until the Nine-Nine helps them take down Figgis. The squad is subsequently punished by being placed on the night shift, but are put back on the day shift when Captain Jason "C.J." Stentley is transferred from active duty for his incompetence. Charles and Genevieve adopt a son, Nikolaj. Adrian returns and resumes his romance with Rosa, but they call off their wedding and decide to take their time getting to know each other. Jake and Amy move in together after having a bet to see which of them can keep their apartment for catching the most escaped criminals. Gina gets hit by a bus and becomes pregnant with the child of a Boyle cousin, Milton. She also saves the precinct from getting shut down. Terry becomes a victim of racial profiling. Jake and Rosa compete for a spot on their idol Lt. Hawkins' task force, but Hawkins turns out to be a dirty cop and she frames them for bank robbery. They are found guilty and are each sentenced to 15 years in prison.

== Cast ==
=== Main ===
- Andy Samberg as Detective Jake Peralta
- Stephanie Beatriz as Detective Rosa Diaz
- Terry Crews as Sergeant Terry Jeffords
- Melissa Fumero as Detective Amy Santiago
- Joe Lo Truglio as Detective Charles Boyle
- Chelsea Peretti as Gina Linetti
- Andre Braugher as Captain Raymond Holt

=== Starring ===
- Dirk Blocker as Detective Michael Hitchcock
- Joel McKinnon Miller as Detective Norm Scully

=== Recurring ===
- Ken Marino as Captain Jason "C.J." Stentley
- Jason Mantzoukas as Adrian Pimento
- Gina Gershon as Lt. Melanie Hawkins
- Marc Evan Jackson as Kevin Cozner
- Christopher Gehrman as Sam Boyle

=== Guest ===
- Maya Rudolph as U.S. Marshall Karen Haas
- Rhea Perlman as Estelle
- Jorma Taccone as Taylor
- Esther Povitsky as Emily
- Jim O'Heir as Sheriff Reynolds
- Eric Roberts as Jimmy Figgis
- Zooey Deschanel as Jessica Day
- Jimmy Smits as Victor Santiago
- Mary Lynn Rajskub as Genevieve Mirren-Carter
- Marshawn Lynch as himself
- Craig Robinson as Doug Judy
- Charles Baker as George Judy
- Nathan Fillion as Mark Deveraux
- Greg Germann as Gary Lurmax
- L. Scott Caldwell as Laverne Holt
- Ryan Phillippe as Milton Boyle
- Brent Briscoe as Matthew Langdon
- Desmond Harrington as Officer Maldack
- Andy Daly as Jeffrey Bouché

== Episodes ==
Season 4 episodes
No. overall	No. in season	Title	Directed by	Written by	Original release date	Prod. code	U.S. viewers (millions)
69	1	"Coral Palms: Part 1"	Michael McDonald	Dan Goor	September 20, 2016	401	2.39
Six months after being threatened to be killed by Figgis, Jake and Holt continue to live in the witness protection program in Florida, with the only contact to their previous job being U.S. Marshal Karen Haas. While Holt makes the best of a bad situation, Jake desperately wants to go back home to New York. He secretly tries to work the case in a storage unit but is eventually caught by Holt. Jake tries to blackmail Holt by becoming his boss at The Fun Zone, Holt's temporary place of employment. When a woman records the two of them getting hit by go-karts, they try to get the video back with successful results. They then decide to release the video in order to lure Figgis, and take him down themselves.
70	2	"Coral Palms: Part 2"	Trent O'Donnell	Tricia McAlpin	September 27, 2016	402	2.34
Jake and Holt get arrested by Sheriff Reynolds, a local deputy, after a misunderstanding when they purchase guns to take down Figgis. During this time, Figgis sees the viral video and captures U.S. Marshal Karen Haas. Jake and Holt eventually break out of jail and decide to call the Nine-Nine for help. Meanwhile, C.J., the new captain of the precinct, has a hands-off attitude and lets his subordinates do whatever they want. This begins to bother Amy, and she tries to get the captain to toughen up. Later, when the group confronts the captain, he refuses to give them permission to help Jake and Holt.
71	3	"Coral Palms: Part 3"	Payman Benz	Justin Noble	October 4, 2016	403	2.40
Now fugitives, Jake and Holt attempt to avoid the local police while the precinct arrives in Florida from a road trip to help out. They all head to The Fun Zone to lure in Figgis. Meanwhile, Jake and Amy find themselves reconnecting in an awkward way, and Gina tries to help Holt with his injury. Figgis takes Jake's bait and his crew heads with him to The Fun Zone. The precinct takes down the accomplices and Jake ends up facing Figgis. Jake gains the upper hand, but Sheriff Reynolds arrives to arrest Jake and gets shot by Figgis. Figgis holds a gun to Jake's head when Amy arrives, then Amy shoots Jake's leg. Figgis escapes, but is forced to surrender after his car is smashed by Gina and Holt's semi-trailer truck. Back in Brooklyn, the group is scolded by Captain C.J. for going to Florida, and he puts them on the overnight shift as punishment.
72	4	"The Night Shift"	Tristram Shapeero	Matt Murray	October 11, 2016	404	2.13
Jake and Charles try to track a thief, but find much less assistance available on the night shift. Meanwhile, Charles wants to spend time with his recently adopted son, Nikolaj, forcing Jake to work without his partner. He eventually finds the perpetrator, but his leg injury gives the perpetrator a head start. Jake ends up commandeering Jessica Day's car (she says "It's a crossover"), but crashes it into a newspaper stand. The perp gets away, but Jake is happy to be able to bond with Charles' son. Holt also tries to lift the spirits of the precinct after they are put on the night shift, while Amy tries to figure out what Rosa's hiding. She soon learns Rosa is upset because Pimento hasn't yet returned from witness protection. Note: This episode crosses over with the New Girl episode "Homecoming".
73	5	"Halloween IV"	Claire Scanlon	Phil Augusta Jackson	October 18, 2016	405	2.05
A year after Halloween Part III, Jake, Amy and Holt agree on having another heist to prove once and for all who is in fact the true detective/genius in the 99. Holt begins to thwart Jake plans by choosing Charles for his team, while Rosa fully commits to Amy's antics. Meanwhile, Hitchcock and Scully are given the task to watch Terry, as the crew suspects he has something up his sleeve when he refuses to be a part of the heist. Gina proves who the "Ultimate Human/Genius" is.
74	6	"Monster in the Closet"	Nisha Ganatra	Andrew Guest	November 15, 2016	407	2.18
Adrian Pimento shows up in Charles' apartment. He and Rosa try to pick up right where they left off, stating they will get married in 14 hours, which sends wedding planner Amy into high gear. On a long drive with Jake and Gina to retrieve his grandmother's earrings, Adrian keeps seeing signs from the universe that he should not get married, while Rosa gets drunk during the wedding preparation. Adrian and Rosa eventually realize that they have cold feet, and decide to get to know each other better before getting hitched.
75	7	"Mr. Santiago"	Alex Reid	Neil Campbell	November 22, 2016	408	2.19
Amy is hosting Thanksgiving for the Nine-Nine crew and has invited her father, Victor, a retired cop whom Jake has never met. Jake creates a binder with Victor's likes and dislikes in hopes of earning his approval, only to learn that Victor has made a binder on him and does not think Jake is right for Amy. Despite this, the two work together to solve a 20-year-old case of Victor's. Meanwhile, Holt loans Pimento $2,000 to help him get a Private Investigator's license, only to have Pimento gamble it away on a dog show that Holt is watching on TV.
76	8	"Skyfire Cycle"	Michael McDonald	David Phillips	November 29, 2016	406	2.34
When D.C. Parlov, author of the popular Skyfire Cycle book series, starts receiving death threats, Terry, a fan of the books since his teen years, gets a chance to meet his idol. But all is not as it seems, when the threats appear to be an inside job. Meanwhile, the recently returned Kevin argues with Holt over a math puzzle. Amy angers Holt by agreeing with Kevin, while Rosa has a different solution to the problem. Also, Gina tries to turn the Boyle family against Charles and change their annual family vacation locale from Iowa to Aruba.
77	9	"The Overmining"	Dean Holland	Luke Del Tredici	December 6, 2016	409	2.31
Captain C.J. loses key evidence in a drug case, which delights Jake because it may get C.J. kicked off the day shift, allowing Holt and the crew to return. But Holt convinces Jake they have to find the evidence and help C.J. close the case, which gives Holt a clever path to hand C.J. the keys to driving his career out the 99th once and for all. Elsewhere, Terry is under orders to reduce power consumption at the Nine-Nine, and he battles Gina when she refuses to turn off her space heater. Also, Rosa learns of a secret place to which Charles likes to disappear in the wee hours of the night.
78	10	"Captain Latvia"	Jaffar Mahmood	Matt Lawton	December 13, 2016	410	2.15
The Nine-Nine precinct attempts to defeat the MTA Police in the annual Christmas singing competition. Meanwhile, Boyle and Jake attempt to track down the imported toy that Charles bought Nicolaj for Christmas, and find themselves infiltrating the Latvian mob.
79	11	"The Fugitive"	Rebecca Asher	Carol Kolb	January 1, 2017	411	3.49
80	12	"The Fugitive"	Ryan Case	Justin Noble & Jessica Polonsky	January 1, 2017	412	3.49
The squad goes on a manhunt for a group of nine convicts who've escaped from a prison van on the streets of Brooklyn. Amy and Jake form teams and propose a bet on whose team will capture the most convicts, with the loser having to move into the winner's apartment. With the score tied 4–4, Jake decides to let Amy win the bet. The remaining fugitive is revealed to be the foster brother of Doug Judy, the Pontiac Bandit, so Jake enlists the help of his nemesis to track the fugitive down. Meanwhile, back at the precinct, Amy and Gina teach Charles about proper texting etiquette to get him back on the text chain. Gina gets hit by a bus while receiving a text from him.
81	13	"The Audit"	Beth McCarthy Miller	Carly Hallam Tosh	April 11, 2017	413	1.91
Captain Holt tells the squad that crime is down sharply in Brooklyn, but everyone's happiness over this news turns to horror when he then says that the NYPD is looking to shut down one precinct out of the 22 in the borough. All of the squads are being audited, and the 9-9's auditor is Amy's ex-boyfriend Teddy, who hasn't forgotten that Amy dumped him with encouragement from Jake. Jake and Amy end up in a comedy of errors in alternately trying to make nice with Teddy and keep him from finding out they still think he's the most boring man alive. At the precinct, Holt tasks Terry to fix a $21,000 Japanese copier that former Captain C.J. ordered, and Boyle and Diaz have to deal with a rat infestation emergency. Gina returns much too early from being badly injured when hit by a bus and uses her status to help fix the 9-9's maintenance issues, while Teddy eventually recuses himself from auditing his ex's squad. The new auditor is a woman who used to date Terry, despises him in the present, and tells him that she's going to shut the 9-9 down for good.
82	14	"Serve & Protect"	Michael Schur	Andrew Guest & Alexis Wilkinson	April 18, 2017	414	1.91
With Terry's ex-girlfriend Veronica now running the audit of the 9-9, Amy and Gina try to figure out what Terry did wrong during the breakup that has Veronica still holding a grudge, but Terry insists he was as nice about it as possible. Jake and Rosa tackle the case of a missing laptop computer on the set of the TV crime show Serve & Protect, which finds Jake's judgment clouded when the executive producer offers him a "consulting producer" role for the series, and more disruptions from the fact that the star of that show Mark Devereaux is acting like he's really an NYPD detective. Meanwhile, Holt and Charles decide to go over Veronica's head and straight to the Deputy Commissioner. Upon discovering dirt on the DC, the two are at odds over whether they should resort to blackmail.
83	15	"The Last Ride"	Linda Mendoza	David Phillips	April 25, 2017	415	1.88
Holt announces the Nine-Nine has a very good chance of being shut down, stating it is between them and the 74th Precinct. Terry learns he needs to work one more case to catch Hitchcock, who has closed the most cases in the history of the 99th, mainly due to being there 20 years longer. Gina continually pranks the detectives while live-casting herself in front of her audience the "Ginazon". Amy convinces Holt to speed through five years of mentorship before the Nine-Nine closes. Jake and Charles set out on their last case together, which balloons into a big drug bust. They go for the bigger collar, even though it means the case will not be resolved until after HQ's decision. The precinct goes to a bar expecting to be shut down, but Holt soon exclaims they are staying open, thanks to the "Ginazon" protesting to the commissioner's office.
84	16	"Moo Moo"	Maggie Carey	Phil Augusta Jackson	May 2, 2017	418	1.72
Terry experiences racial profiling near his house at night as he is searching for his daughters’ blanket on the street, dropped from the minivan when Jake and Amy drove his daughters home. Holt disagrees that Terry insists to file a complaint to the officer concerned, as it may affect Terry’s career advancement that Holt considers as a step to "change the system". Later, he understands that his position as captain enables him to support Terry as none of his own superiors ever did. Meanwhile, Jake and Amy face the challenges of parenthood as Cagney and Lacey persist on knowing what causes their father to get in trouble.
85	17	"Cop-Con"	Giovani Lampassi	Andy Gosche	May 9, 2017	416	1.79
The Nine-Nine crew attends a crime-fighting convention in Rochester with the intent to party, but Holt insists they are there to learn. Holt is also bucking for a spot on the state board against a long-time rival. When the gang tries to sneak in a party that night, Charles misplaces a laptop that contains Holt's presentation to the board. Meanwhile, Scully falls for a female attendee who is like him in many ways.
86	18	"Chasing Amy"	Luke Del Tredici	Matt Lawton	May 9, 2017	417	1.44
Jake tries to help Amy prepare for a sergeant's exam, but unknown to him, Amy is avoiding the exam because becoming Jake's superior could have a negative effect on their relationship. Meanwhile, Gina is bequeathed an important Boyle family heirloom that belonged to Charles' recently deceased aunt, but she accidentally destroys it. Terry and Holt build a model train set for the kids in the lobby to enjoy and compete over which set is more appealing.
87	19	"Your Honor"	Michael McDonald	David Phillips & Carly Hallam Tosh	May 16, 2017	419	1.65
Jake tries to impress Holt's mother, the Honorable Laverne Holt, while working the case of a break-in at her home. In doing so, he stumbles upon a secret that even Captain Holt doesn't know about his mother. At the precinct, Amy tries to teach a disinterested Gina how to change a tire on her car, while Terry's, Charles' and Rosa's refurnishing of the break room is met with resounding disapproval, especially from Scully and Hitchcock.
88	20	"The Slaughterhouse"	Victor Nelli Jr.	Neil Campbell	May 16, 2017	420	1.38
Jake and Rosa work a drug case and find that they are interfering with an undercover investigation by Lt. Hawkins, whom they both greatly admire. A competition ensues when Hawkins indicates there might be room for one of the two on her task force. Holt tries to get a reluctant Amy to express anger with him when he loses her favorite pen. Meanwhile, Hitchcock is constantly fighting with Scully, stemming from Scully beginning to choose his new girlfriend over him. In the end, Jake discovers that Hawkins and her task force are connected to recent bank robberies.
89	21	"The Bank Job"	Matthew Nodella	Carol Kolb	May 23, 2017	421	1.78
Jake and Rosa try to infiltrate Lt. Hawkins' corrupt operation. They attempt to get on her "good side" by faking corruptness and beating up Adrian Pimento, who is more than willing to help. At the precinct, Terry, Amy and Charles find evidence that Gina may be pregnant. She later reveals she is, and that the father is Boyle's cousin Milton. The following day, a hungover Jake and Rosa are forced to participate in Hawkins' latest bank robbery. When they text Holt and the precinct about where to meet them, they realize Hawkins has given them a fake address and are eventually framed and arrested by Hawkins herself for robbing the banks.
90	22	"Crime and Punishment"	Dan Goor	Justin Noble & Jessica Polonsky	May 23, 2017	422	1.50
After two months have passed from being framed and arrested for the bank robberies, Jake and Rosa prepare to go on trial. Terry and a very stressed Charles hire a hacker to trace the source of Cayman Islands bank accounts that were somehow created in Jake's and Rosa's names. While on bail, Jake and Amy head to Pennsylvania to find a former colleague of Hawkins, who refuses to testify as a witness at first for fear of retribution. He later does, but it is revealed that the man is still working with Hawkins and is the person who transferred the robbery money in the first place. In the end, Jake and Rosa are both found guilty by the jurors.

== Reception ==
=== Ratings ===
Viewership and ratings per episode of Brooklyn Nine-Nine season 4
No.	Title	Air date	Rating/share (18–49)	Viewers (millions)	DVR (18–49)	DVR viewers (millions)	Total (18–49)	Total viewers (millions)
1	"Coral Palms Pt. 1"	September 20, 2016	1.1/4	2.39	—N/a	1.14	—N/a	3.53
2	"Coral Palms Pt. 2"	September 27, 2016	1.0/4	2.34	0.6	1.15	1.6	3.49
3	"Coral Palms Pt. 3"	October 4, 2016	1.0/4	2.40	0.6	1.02	1.6	3.42
4	"The Night Shift"	October 11, 2016	0.9/3	2.13	0.7	1.13	1.6	3.25
5	"Halloween IV"	October 18, 2016	0.9/3	2.05	0.6	—N/a	1.5	—N/a
6	"Monster in the Closet"	November 15, 2016	0.9/3	2.18	0.6	1.02	1.5	3.20
7	"Mr. Santiago"	November 22, 2016	0.9/3	2.19	0.5	0.99	1.4	3.18
8	"Skyfire Cycle"	November 29, 2016	1.0/3	2.34	—N/a	—N/a	—N/a	—N/a
9	"The Overmining"	December 6, 2016	1.0/4	2.31	0.6	1.01	1.6	3.32
10	"Captain Latvia"	December 13, 2016	0.9/4	2.15	0.6	0.91	1.5	3.06
11–12	"The Fugitive"	January 1, 2017	1.3/4	3.49	0.6	0.96	1.9	4.44^{1}
13	"The Audit"	April 11, 2017	0.7/3	1.91	0.5	0.95	1.2	2.85
14	"Serve & Protect"	April 18, 2017	0.7/3	1.91	0.5	0.85	1.2	2.76
15	"The Last Ride"	April 25, 2017	0.7/3	1.88	—N/a	—N/a	—N/a	—N/a
16	"Moo Moo"	May 2, 2017	0.6/3	1.72	0.5	—N/a	1.1	—N/a
17	"Cop-Con"	May 9, 2017	0.7/3	1.79	—N/a	—N/a	—N/a	—N/a
18	"Chasing Amy"	May 9, 2017	0.6/2	1.44	0.5	0.95	1.1	2.39
19	"Your Honor"	May 16, 2017	0.7/3	1.65	—N/a	—N/a	—N/a	—N/a
20	"The Slaughterhouse"	May 16, 2017	0.6/3	1.38	0.4	0.77	1.0	2.14
21	"The Bank Job"	May 23, 2017	0.7/3	1.78	0.4	0.88	1.1	2.66
22	"Crime and Punishment"	May 23, 2017	0.6/2	1.50	0.5	0.91	1.1	2.41

=== Critical response ===
The fourth season received critical acclaim, with many lauding the Florida story arc and the tactful treatment of systematic racism. The review aggregator website Rotten Tomatoes reports a 100% approval rating, with an average score of 8.09/10, based on 13 reviews. The website's consensus reads, "Riotous shenanigans still reign supreme, but Brooklyn Nine-Nine's fourth season also broaches controversial issues with its trademark compassion and eloquent humor."

=== Awards and nominations ===
Award	Date of ceremony	Category	Recipients and nominees	Result
People's Choice Awards	January 18, 2017	Favorite Comedic TV Actor	Andy Samberg	Nominated

^1 Live +7 ratings were not available, so Live +3 ratings have been used instead.
