= Moo Moo (Brooklyn Nine-Nine) =

- Brooklyn Nine-Nine episode
- Episode no.: Season 4 Episode 16
- Directed by: Maggie Carey
- Written by: Phil Augusta Jackson
- Cinematography by: Giovani Lampassi
- Editing by: Jeremy Reuben
- Production code: 418
- Original air date: May 2, 2017
- Running time: 22 minutes

Guest appearances
- Desmond Harrington as Officer Maldack; Mary Holland as Tricia

Episode chronology
← Previous "The Last Ride"	Next → "Cop-Con"
- Brooklyn Nine-Nine season 4

"Moo Moo" is the sixteenth episode of the fourth season of the American television police sitcom series Brooklyn Nine-Nine and the 84th episode of the series. It was written by Phil Augusta Jackson and directed by Maggie Carey. It aired on Fox in the United States on May 2, 2017. It features guest appearances from Desmond Harrington and Mary Holland.

The show revolves around the fictitious 99th precinct of the New York Police Department in Brooklyn and the officers and detectives who work there. In the episode, Terry experiences racial profiling when he is nearly arrested just for walking near his own house at night. He then consults with Holt regarding the right thing to do. While Terry works to solve the problem, Jake and Amy babysit his daughters.

The episode was seen by an estimated 1.72 million household viewers and gained a 0.6/3 ratings share among adults aged 18–49, according to Nielsen Media Research. It received acclaim from critics and audiences, who praised Terry Crews' performance and the subject matter; many deemed it one of the series's best episodes.

== Plot ==
In the cold open, Boyle appears in the same outfit as Terry and asks his colleagues who pull off the look better. To his dismay, they unanimously agree Terry does.

Terry (Terry Crews) decides to apply as a city council liaison for additional responsibilities. To buy himself time to complete the paperwork, he has Jake (Andy Samberg) and Amy (Melissa Fumero) pick up his daughters. During the trip, Cagney's blanket, "Moo Moo", is accidentally thrown out of the car. Upon learning this, Terry heads out into the night to find it.

After he finds the blanket, Terry is stopped by Officer Maldack (Desmond Harrington), who snarls at him for daring to be outside at night and nearly arrests him, not backing off until Terry is able to identify himself as a cop. While discussing the incident of racial profiling with the uniformly shocked and angry precinct (even Hitchcock is furious), Terry decides to meet with Maldack. Maldack apologizes for his behavior, but only because it turns out Terry was a fellow officer. Terry tells Maldack he targeted him for being black and asks for an apology, but Maldack refuses, claiming stopping Terry was "doing his job". Terry decides to file a complaint and asks Holt (Andre Braugher) to submit it. To his surprise, Holt suggests the complaint isn't the best idea. While babysitting Terry's daughters, Jake and Amy explain Terry's problem to them and discuss being a minority in America.

When Terry confronts him, Holt explains he doesn't want to submit the complaint because the fallout from doing so might affect Terry's career. Instead, he tells Terry he should continue to rise through the ranks so he can help change the system. Terry then explains to Holt as an overweight child, a cop saved him from bullies. The gratitude and respect he felt for the cops was the exact opposite of how Maldack made him feel. Holt decides to support Terry and submit the complaint. The next day, Holt tells Terry his application for the liaison job was denied, most likely due to his complaint. However, they both feel they did the right thing.

== Reception ==
=== Viewers ===
In its original American broadcast, "Moo Moo" was seen by an estimated 1.72 million household viewers and gained a 0.6/3 ratings share among adults aged 18–49, according to Nielsen Media Research. This was slight decrease in viewership from the previous episode, which was watched by 1.88 million viewers with a 0.7/3 in the 18-49 demographics. This means that 0.6 percent of all households with televisions watched the episode, while 3 percent of all households watching television at that time watched it. With these ratings, Brooklyn Nine-Nine was the third highest rated show on FOX for the night, behind The Mick and Prison Break, seventh on its timeslot and sixteenth for the night, behind two episodes of Great News, The Mick, Agents of S.H.I.E.L.D., Imaginary Mary, Prison Break, The Flash, The Real O'Neals, NCIS: New Orleans, American Housewife, The Middle, Bull, Chicago Fire, NCIS, and The Voice.

=== Critical reviews ===
"Moo Moo" received acclaim from critics. LaToya Ferguson of The A.V. Club gave it a "B" grade and wrote, "After last week's hilarious faux goodbye to the Nine-Nine, the possibilities were endless for where Brooklyn Nine-Nine could go. I can't personally say an episode about police profiling against one of the Nine-Nine's own is where I thought the show would immediately go—especially not with the episode title 'Moo Moo' —but it's quite a way for the show to kick off May sweeps and get the Nine-Nine back in the groove after weeks of worrying about closing up shop."

Alan Sepinwall of Uproxx wrote, "Fortunately, the serious half of 'Moo Moo' felt honest and real without undercutting the show's usual goofiness, and it felt like a good way to take advantage of both the inclusiveness of the cast — if Terry Crews was the only [Black] regular on the show, this story plays very differently — and the varied skill sets of the ensemble." Andy Crump of Paste gave the episode a 9.3 and wrote, "That doesn't change in 'Moo Moo,' really, but 'Moo Moo' is, perhaps, the fourth season's best beneficiary to date of Brooklyn Nine-Nine's longstanding character developments: Here, the amount of time we've spent investing in its cast pays off with astronomic results, even if there aren't many belly laughs included in those results. Maybe the idea of reduced funny stuff in Brooklyn Nine-Nine is anathema to you."
