= The Bet (Brooklyn Nine-Nine) =

- Brooklyn Nine-Nine episode
- Episode no.: Season 1 Episode 13
- Directed by: Julian Farino
- Written by: Laura McCreary
- Cinematography by: Giovani Lampassi
- Editing by: Sandra Montiel
- Production code: 112
- Original air date: January 14, 2014
- Running time: 22 minutes

Guest appearances
- Dirk Blocker as Michael Hitchcock; Joel McKinnon Miller as Norm Scully; Merrin Dungey as Sharon Jeffords

Episode chronology
← Previous "Pontiac Bandit"	Next → "The Ebony Falcon"
- Brooklyn Nine-Nine season 1

"The Bet" is the thirteenth episode of the first season of the American television police sitcom series Brooklyn Nine-Nine. The episode was written by co-executive producer Laura McCreary and directed by Julian Farino. It aired on Fox in the United States on January 14, 2014. It was the twelfth episode to be produced but the thirteenth to be broadcast.

In this episode, Peralta finally wins the bet he had with Santiago to catch the biggest number of criminals. He then prepares to bring her on the "worst date ever". However, the date is interrupted when they are forced to participate in a stakeout. Meanwhile, Charles Boyle (Joe Lo Truglio) is honored with the Medal of Valor, but suffers effects from medication. The episode was seen by an estimated 3.53 million household viewers and gained a 1.4/4 ratings share among adults aged 18–49, according to Nielsen Media Research. The episode received mostly positive reviews from critics, who praised the performances of the cast, particularly Samberg's and Fumero's.

== Plot ==
Charles Boyle (Joe Lo Truglio) is awarded the Medal of Valor in a ceremony for his previous heroic actions. However, his moment is overshadowed by another recipient of the Medal; a horse called Sgt. Peanut Butter who poops on stage. During a photo session, Boyle falls off the stage and is treated with pain medication. However, the medication makes Boyle reveal the truth to anyone he talks to.

Jake Peralta (Andy Samberg) and Amy Santiago's (Melissa Fumero) competition for most criminals caught is close to its end. They both have the same score in the competition. With one minute left, Santiago catches a criminal, but Peralta reveals he just raided a sex ring and took in 30 men (10 of which get arrested, since it is their second offense and therefore a felony), which helps him win the bet. Peralta then takes Santiago on the "worst date ever."

During the date, Peralta gets to make every decision for Santiago until midnight. They go to Shaw's where the precinct has gone to celebrate Boyle's award before Jake plans on taking her to Times Square and have a choir sing to her to rub her failure in. However, their date is interrupted when Raymond Holt (Andre Braugher) is notified about a chance to stakeout a local robbery operation, and forces the two of them to attend it. During the stakeout, Peralta and Santiago bond over talking about Peralta's car that Santiago would've gotten if she won the bet. Peralta goes as far as declining Holt's offer to get replacements and forgoing his plans for the rest of the night. Posing as a couple, they manage to catch the perps.

At Shaw's, Holt accidentally reveals to Sharon Jeffords (Merrin Dungey) that her husband Terry (Terry Crews) has returned to fieldwork after saving his life, causing her to storm off. Every time Terry attempts to downplay his actions to her, Holt ends up making it worse by immediately contradicting what Terry said in an attempt to improve the situation. The drugged but honest Boyle resolves the situation by properly highlighting Terry's accomplishments while also reprimanding him for lying to his wife.

Meanwhile, Rosa Diaz (Stephanie Beatriz) evades Boyle because she fears he will reveal his feelings for her. However, he reveals that he didn't know she was the one he was saving. Instead, he simply acted out of instinct. This makes Rosa feel better, even if Boyle revealed he still wants to go out with her.

== Reception ==
=== Viewers ===
In its original American broadcast, "The Bet" was seen by an estimated 3.53 million household viewers and gained a 1.4/4 ratings share among adults aged 18–49, according to Nielsen Media Research. This was a slight increase in viewership from the previous episode, which was watched by 3.44 million viewers with a 1.5/4 in the 18-49 demographics. This means that 1.4 percent of all households with televisions watched the episode, while 4 percent of all households watching television at that time watched it. With these ratings, Brooklyn Nine-Nine was the second most watched show on FOX for the night, beating Dads and The Mindy Project but behind New Girl, fourth on its timeslot and ninth for the night in the 18-49 demographics, behind New Girl, The Biggest Loser, The Goldbergs, Chicago Fire, Person of Interest, Agents of S.H.I.E.L.D., NCIS: Los Angeles, and NCIS.

=== Critical reviews ===
"The Bet" received mostly positive reviews from critics. Roth Cornet of IGN gave the episode a "great" 8.5 out of 10 and wrote, "Brooklyn Nine-Nine delivers another great episode following their big Golden Globe win, as Peralta must deal with grown-up feelings and Holt - as much as Holt can - loses his cool."

Molly Eichel of The A.V. Club gave the episode an "A−" grade and wrote, "You have to figure (or at least hope) that 'The Bet' will land a few new pairs of eyeballs intrigued by the out-of-nowhere Golden Globes domination. So, it's a good thing that Brooklyn Nine-Nine came back with an episode that was both sweet and funny, combining some of the best aspects of the show into one entry."

Alan Sepinwall of HitFix wrote, "Beyond that, 'The Bet' was another strong episode for the whole ensemble. Boyle being upstaged by Sgt. Peanut Butter was maybe too similar to L'il Sebastian, but his bout of candor from the painkillers led to a lot of funny moments, plus one absolutely perfect stunned reaction from Stephanie Beatriz after Charles told Rosa of his plan to win her heart by being himself. Holt getting Terry into trouble felt a bit formulaic, but it's also good to see something Holt isn’t good at, and to have Merrin Dungey (Francie!) join the larger ensemble as Terry’s wife Sharon."
