= The Audit (Brooklyn Nine-Nine) =

- Brooklyn Nine-Nine episode
- Episode no.: Season 4 Episode 13
- Directed by: Beth McCarthy-Miller
- Written by: Carly Hallam Tosh
- Cinematography by: Giovani Lampassi
- Editing by: Jason Gill
- Production code: 413
- Original air date: April 11, 2017
- Running time: 22 minutes

Guest appearances
- Kyle Bornheimer as Teddy Wells; Kimberly Hébert Gregory as Veronica Hopkins; Jama Williamson as Rachel

Episode chronology
| ← Previous "The Fugitive" | Next → "Serve & Protect" |
- Brooklyn Nine-Nine season 4

"The Audit" is the thirteenth episode of the fourth season of the American television police sitcom series Brooklyn Nine-Nine and the 81st overall episode of the series. The episode was written by Carly Hallam Tosh and directed by Beth McCarthy-Miller. It aired on Fox in the United States on April 11, 2017.

The show revolves around the fictitious 99th precinct of the New York Police Department in Brooklyn and the officers and detectives that work in the precinct. In the episode, the precinct undergoes an audit when the crime goes down and a precinct has to be shut down. However, the auditor turns out to be Teddy, Amy's ex-boyfriend. While Jake and Amy try to calm Teddy, Holt works to clean the precinct.

The episode was seen by an estimated 1.91 million household viewers and gained a 0.7/3 ratings share among adults aged 18–49, according to Nielsen Media Research. The episode received generally positive reviews from critics, who praised the cast performances.

== Plot ==
After Gina (Chelsea Peretti) recovers from her accident with a halo brace, Holt (Andre Braugher) informs the precinct that while crime in New York has declined, this caused the NYPD to consider shutting down one of the 23 precincts in Brooklyn. As such, an auditor is coming to inspect the precinct.

The auditor, however, turns out to be Teddy (Kyle Bornheimer), Amy's (Melissa Fumero) ex-boyfriend. Jake (Andy Samberg) and Amy spend time with Teddy to prove to him the precinct is fine, although both note he still remains the "most boring person in America". They find that as Teddy left his phone recording, they accidentally said rude things about him. While dining with Teddy and his new girlfriend Rachel (Jama Williamson), Jake and Amy retrieve the phone although they still tell Teddy about it. Teddy then reveals that he still loves Amy and proposes to her in front of Rachel, and is rejected by both.

Meanwhile, in order to pass the audit and give a good impression, Holt tasks Terry (Terry Crews) to fix a $21,000 Japanese copier that former Captain C.J. ordered. Despite the struggle, he manages to translate the instructions and fix it. Also, Boyle (Joe Lo Truglio) is tasked with solving a rat infestation in the precinct. However, Boyle gets stuck in the air vent, and the rats cause him to shake up and break a water pipe, destroying the ceiling and the copier in the process. Holt then uses Gina in order to get sympathy from the NYPD's Facilities crew to fix the damages, and the precinct is cleaned. Teddy arrives and announces that he has decided to recuse himself from auditing the precinct. The new auditor, Veronica Hopkins (Kimberly Hebert Gregory) turns out to be Terry's ex-girlfriend. Despising him, she tells him she will shut down the precinct for good.

== Reception ==
=== Viewers ===
In its original American broadcast, "The Audit" was seen by an estimated 1.91 million household viewers and gained a 0.7/3 ratings share among adults aged 18–49, according to Nielsen Media Research. This was a 46% decrease in viewership from the previous episode, which was watched by 3.49 million viewers with a 1.3/4 in the 18-49 demographics. This means that 0.7 percent of all households with televisions watched the episode, while 3 percent of all households watching television at that time watched it. With these ratings, Brooklyn Nine-Nine was the third highest rated show on FOX for the night, behind The Mick and Prison Break, sixth on its timeslot and fourteenth for the night, behind Agents of S.H.I.E.L.D., a rerun of NCIS: New Orleans, a rerun of Bull, The Mick, two episodes of Trial & Error, Imaginary Mary, a rerun of NCIS, Prison Break, Fresh Off the Boat, American Housewife, The Middle, and The Voice.

=== Critical reviews ===
"The Audit" received generally positive reviews from critics. LaToya Ferguson of The A.V. Club gave the episode a "B" grade and wrote, "But still, the episode is very broad, which is always a risky choice for Brooklyn Nine-Nine. Immature hijinks from Jake and Amy (with an 'of course he was still recording' plot), wacky Japanese copiers for Terry, and coked-up rats for Boyle: That's this episode in a nutshell, which is really just as weird in practice as it is on paper."

Alan Sepinwall of Uproxx wrote, "When last we left our constabulary heroes, Gina had just gotten the full Todd Mulcahy from an oncoming bus. Fortunately, Chelsea Peretti wasn't leaving the show, even temporarily, and 'The Audit' opens with Gina returning to work earlier than she should, a halo brace holding her together but also making her movements painful. It's a good physical comedy showcase for Peretti, particularly when Gina has to pop and lock while screaming in agony." Andy Crump of Paste gave the episode a 8.6 and wrote, "And this is where Brooklyn Nine-Nine excels, and why, perhaps, it's good for the show to take a seemingly unnecessary mid-season break in the wintertime: The quality of banter and sheer comic velocity is extraordinarily high in 'The Audit,' and the gags are built and paid off brilliantly."
