= Superstore season 6 =

Season of television series

Superstore
- Season 6
- Promotional poster with the season premiere's original airdate
- Starring: America Ferrera; Ben Feldman; Lauren Ash; Colton Dunn; Nico Santos; Nichole Sakura; Kaliko Kauahi; Mark McKinney
- No. of episodes: 15

Release
- Original network: NBC
- Original release: October 29, 2020 – March 25, 2021

Season chronology
- ← Previous; Season 5

The sixth and final season of the American sitcom Superstore was ordered on February 11, 2020, and premiered the same year on NBC on October 29. Created by Justin Spitzer, the series continues to follow a group of employees working at Cloud 9, a fictional big-box store in St. Louis, Missouri. The ensemble and supporting cast features America Ferrera, Ben Feldman, Lauren Ash, Colton Dunn, Nico Santos, Nichole Sakura, Kaliko Kauahi, and Mark McKinney.

Production for the season began in September 2020 in the midst of the COVID-19 pandemic. As a test for Universal Television, producers decided that Superstore would create episodes set during the pandemic. In December 2020, NBC announced that the season would serve as the show's last. After filming concluded in February 2021, Ferrera, who had left after the first two episodes, was revealed to return for the series finale.

For the first five episodes, the season aired on Thursdays at 8:00 pm (Eastern), before airing at 8:30 pm beginning with episode 6. The season featured the 100th episode of the series and concluded on March 25, 2021, with a one-hour series finale. "Essential", the season premiere, brought in 2.80 million viewers, while "All Sales Final", the series finale, was viewed by 2.41 million people. Overall, the season received positive reviews from critics, who praised the humor and conclusion of the series.

== Cast ==
=== Main ===
- America Ferrera as Amy Sosa (Note: Credited as a series regular for the first two episodes of the season, uncredited in episode 13 and billed as a "special guest star" in episodes 14 and 15.)
- Ben Feldman as Jonah Simms
- Lauren Ash as Dina Fox
- Colton Dunn as Garrett McNeil
- Nico Santos as Mateo Fernando Aquino Liwanag
- Nichole Sakura as Cheyenne Thompson
- Kaliko Kauahi as Sandra Kaluiokalani
- Mark McKinney as Glenn Sturgis

=== Recurring ===
- Jon Barinholtz as Marcus White
- Kelly Schumann as Justine Sikowitz
- Amir M. Korangy as Sayid
- Irene White as Carol Maloon
- Steve Agee as Isaac
- Baron Vaughn as Ken
- Rory Scovel as Dr. Brian Patterson
- Maria Thayer as Hannah

=== Guest ===
- Kelly Stables as Kelly Watson
- Tony Plana as Ron Sosa
- Marlene Forte as Connie Sosa
- George Salazar as Eric Sosa
- Michael Bunin as Jeff Sutton
- Dave Foley as Lowell Anderson

== Episodes ==
No. overall	No. in season	Title	Directed by	Written by	Original release date	Prod. code	U.S. viewers (millions)
99	1	"Essential"	Victor Nelli, Jr.	Bridget Kyle & Vicky Luu	October 29, 2020	601	2.80
This episode takes place from March to July 2020, as the store deals with the effects of the COVID-19 pandemic in the United States. Amy's new job in California is forced to be postponed for the time being and she continues as store manager. After being called "heroes", Dina and Glenn try to get the customers' approval of their assistance. As toilet paper and other essential products disappear from the shelves, Cheyenne and Sandra come up with a plan to hide products that they purchase later. Amy's name tag: Karla / Anh / Annie / Kyle / Elise
100	2	"California (Part 2)"	Victor Nelli, Jr.	Owen Ellickson	November 5, 2020	522	2.24
As her last day at Cloud 9 lingers, Amy worries that Jonah wants to take their relationship to the next level with an engagement proposal after discovering a missing ring. Later on, the pair get into an argument stating they want different things, professionally and personally, and decide that Jonah is not moving. Meanwhile, with Amy leaving, Dina scrambles to find a new best friend. Also, newly reinstated store manager Glenn asks Mateo and Cheyenne to make a video collage of Amy's time at Cloud 9. Amy's name tag: Lucia Note: This episode was originally written as the preceding season's finale, but aired this season because of production shutdown due to the impact of the COVID-19 pandemic.
101	3	"Floor Supervisor"	Betsy Thomas	Josh Malmuth	November 12, 2020	602	2.35
Amy's departure and Glenn's promotion back to store manager leaves a vacancy in Glenn's old floor supervisor position. Having promised Jerusha he would avoid the stress he previously experienced as store manager, Glenn lets the employees cast a vote for who they want as floor supervisor. Jonah decides to throw his hat into the ring, but Dina suggests that Cheyenne should take the spot, thinking she would be easier to manipulate, though Cheyenne proves to have good ideas of her own and wins the election. Sandra asks Garrett to talk to her foster son about safe sex. After Glenn authorizes "executive decisions" to Mateo, the latter begins to go overboard to the extent of firing Justine.
102	4	"Prize Wheel"	Ryan Case	Laura McCreary	November 19, 2020	603	2.28
To encourage customers to resume shopping in person, the store installs a huge prize wheel as a promotion. Glenn is excited to see customers spinning the wheel, but upon showing up, he announces he was exposed to a COVID-19 positive person in his church choir. He spends the day in his car getting wheel updates from Sandra over the phone. This leaves Dina to run the store and, having frequently criticized Glenn's management style, she is determined to run a tight ship. This does not endear her to the staff, who openly announce they want Glenn back. Meanwhile, Jonah is excited to learn that his dad set up an interview with a corporation focused on alternative energy, and he lets Garrett and Cheyenne know of his desire to move on. Jonah is then disappointed to learn that he does not qualify for the job because he did not finish business school.
103	5	"Hair Care Products"	Charles Stone III	Dayo Adesokan	January 14, 2021	604	2.51
After Cloud 9 changes their policy of locking up Black beauty products, the employees are forced to reckon with systemic racism, with Garrett leading the charge and creating a list of other racist issues that need to be changed, both in the store and with Cloud 9 as a whole. Glenn, still in quarantine, attempts to help out but ends up causing more problems. Meanwhile, after Sandra turns down their party invite due to concerns that they do not take COVID-19 seriously, Cheyenne and Mateo go overboard trying to convince her to change her mind.
104	6	"Biscuit"	Jay Hunter	Justin Shanes	January 21, 2021	605	2.21
After returning from quarantine, Glenn is upset to see the staff now view Dina as the manager instead of him. In order to restore his authority, he asks Bo to recruit his friends to cause chaos in the store, thereby distracting Dina with her old security duties. Meanwhile, Sandra's cat Biscuit is ill, and she asks the staff to pitch in for a necessary surgery. The cat dies before the surgery takes place, however, and Sandra uses the money to buy a diamond necklace with her cat's ashes inside. The necklace is then stolen by one of the rioters. Meanwhile, an error on a return policy has Garrett scrambling to figure out how to return a dialysis machine, a plane propeller, and a giant tire. The episode ends with Dina and Glenn becoming co-store managers, and learning Carol is suing the store.
105	7	"The Trough"	Kim Nguyen	Rene Gube	January 28, 2021	606	2.05
The staff learns that Jonah is still living in Amy's old house and Mateo and Eric trick Kelly into showing up at the store to get Jonah to move on. Both Kelly and Jonah have no interest in getting back together, and it is revealed that Jonah and Marcus have been roommates. Corporate wants information on Carol so they can figure out how to proceed with her suing the store, asking Dina and Glenn to read the employees' private messages and shadow Carol to see if she acts erratically. Cheyenne is put to work with Carol and report anything she does and finds that Carol is not all that she thinks. Also, while reading messages, Dina and Garrett find out there is a new secret spot in the store, known as "the trough". They find it, and while they are inside, nearly kiss.
106	8	"Ground Rules"	Victor Nelli, Jr.	Jen Vierck	February 4, 2021	607	2.22
Sandra asks Jonah to help train her adopted son Tony when he begins his first day at Cloud 9. Later on, Jonah gets increasingly annoyed when Tony stocks things in the wrong place and slacks off, and accidentally hits him. Sandra and others think he did it intentionally. Meanwhile, after their almost romantic encounter, Dina tells Garrett that she and her boyfriend Brian have agreed to an open relationship. Also, Cheyenne asks Mateo to give her ideas on becoming a better floor supervisor, but he mainly just criticizes her personally.
107	9	"Conspiracy"	James Renfroe	Colton Dunn	February 11, 2021	608	1.93
After Garrett forgets a moment that happened when he and Jonah were living together, Jonah becomes upset and questions how good of friends they actually are. Meanwhile, when he learns coupons are now only digital and receives news that he is no longer able to say "Have a heavenly day" to customers, Glenn worries that Zephra is trying to control them, and enlists Sandra and Marcus to spy on Zephra. Also, Cheyenne and Mateo are still at odds, but find themselves out of the spotlight when Sayid is having relationship troubles.
108	10	"Depositions"	Betsy Thomas	John Kazlauskas	February 25, 2021	609	1.90
A lawyer (Hannah) arrives at Cloud 9 to take depositions regarding Carol's lawsuit over being electrocuted by the store cleaning robot. After coaching Glenn prior to his deposition, Jonah forgets his own advice while being deposed and inadvertently implies Glenn was incompetent as floor supervisor. Mateo, who is a day away from getting his ankle monitor removed, goes to great lengths to keep Eugene from testifying, given that Eugene knows Mateo abandoned his required job in optometry to take the job as Glenn's assistant. Meanwhile, Dina gets jealous when she thinks Garrett is flirting with female customers. After realizing she still has feelings for him that go beyond their sex-only relationship, she tries telling him only to have him say he no longer wants to be a part of it.
109	11	"Deep Cleaning"	Ross Novie	Hailey Chavez	March 4, 2021	610	2.30
A year since the pandemic began, Glenn announces that the store will be shut down for the day so the staff can perform a deep cleaning. To raise their spirits, Glenn enlists help from Garrett on organizing a holiday party for the one they could not hold in December, but it spirals out of control. Dina asks for Cheyenne's assistance to help run the clean up, and things go awry when Dina accidentally gets high on cleaning product fumes. Also, Mateo attempts to impress Amy and Eric's parents, but it becomes tense when they encounter Jonah, who unintentionally implies Mateo wants their permission to ask for Eric's hand in marriage.
110	12	"Customer Satisfaction"	Matt Sohn	Bridget Kyle & Vicky Luu	March 11, 2021	611	1.87
Newly reinstated District Manager Jeff returns to Cloud 9 and urges employees to ask customers to fill out the customer experience survey on their receipt, as their store is the lowest in the district for customer satisfaction. Fearing that they will be fired, Glenn and Dina come up with an idea on how to bring up scores, but putting Marcus in charge of one scheme leads to the store being flooded with water. After Cheyenne reveals the employees with the lowest survey scores and banishes them to the back, a miffed Jonah tries to rally the other selected employees to value themselves by slacking off. Also, Mateo enlists Garrett's help to hide his relationship with Eric from Jeff, only to have Jeff later brag about a non-existent boyfriend.
111	13	"Lowell Anderson"	Kabir Akhtar	Rene Gube & Josh Malmuth	March 18, 2021	612	2.33
Lowell, son of Cloud 9's founder, shows up and much to Cheyenne and Glenn's chagrin makes some ill-advised changes to the store. Dina finds she is no longer happy with her relationship with Brian and is scared to break up with him, only to do it when Garrett facetimes him. Sandra tells Jonah she monitors everyone's social media, and they end up stalking Amy's social media to try to find where she is staying for the weekend in California. Before leaving, Lowell reveals Zephra is planning on closing all the Cloud 9 stores, and Cheyenne calls Amy to see if it is true. Amy's name tag: None (Phone call)
112	14	"Perfect Store"	Victor Nelli, Jr.	Owen Ellickson & Laura McCreary	March 25, 2021	613	2.71
Amy travels from California to St. Louis in an attempt to help save the Ozark Highlands Cloud 9 store, after confirming that 95% of all Cloud 9 stores are slated for closure. After a meeting in the break room and a reunion with Jonah, Amy and the crew attempt to clean up the store to prepare for an inspection by a visiting Zephra representative. Actions include introducing "handsome/hot" greeters to the front entrance, rejecting weird customers, and increasing the flower supply, among others in order to look better than the rival branch in Quincy, IL. Their efforts end up turning awry when Marcus and Justine find eight dismembered human feet in a duffel bag. Shortly after, reporters from several news stations cover the incident, interviewing Jonah. Mateo worries that he might get deported if he is not able to find another job, and tries to be Carol's personal assistant before learning her legal settlement with the store was not that much. The inspector reveals that the store is being converted to a Zephra fulfillment center, citing online shopping's continued dominance. Amy decides to quit her corporate job in California. Amy's name tag: None
113	15	"All Sales Final"	Ruben Fleischer	Teleplay by : Jonathan Green & Gabe Miller; Story by : Justin Spitzer	March 25, 2021	614	2.41
One month later, Amy has moved back to St. Louis, and inadvertently gets given her old job by Glenn as the store prepares to close down and transition to online fulfillment. Glenn struggles with the decision of whether to retire or look for another job. Sandra lends a hand to Dina as she struggles with selecting five employees for the new fulfillment center after being promoted to the center's manager. Also, Amy and Jonah try to figure out where their relationship stands following Jonah's breakup from Hannah. The episode ends with Garrett expressing how happy he was working at Cloud 9 and all the friends he made, while a montage of the future plays: Glenn reopens his previous business "Sturgis & Sons" and hires Cheyenne and Mateo to work there. Jonah and Amy get back together and get married and have a child named Carter, while Jonah runs for City Council and Amy lands another executive job. Dina continues to run the new Zephra fulfillment center along with Sandra, Marcus, and Justine while getting back together with Garrett as boyfriend-girlfriend. Amy's name tag: Vangeline

== Production ==
Superstore was renewed for a sixth season on February 11, 2020, with the intention of airing during the 2020–21 United States network television schedule. On February 28, series star America Ferrera announced that she would depart at the end of the fifth season citing new work opportunities. After production delays to the fifth season's final episode due to the COVID-19 pandemic, Ferrera's role was extended; she was included in the first two episodes of the sixth season to wrap up her character's storyline. In November, Kelly Stables was reported to return in the seventh episode to portray Jonah's ex-girlfriend Kelly. Prior to the episode's release, the plot for her return was kept under wraps. Production for the sixth season began in September 2020 with full safety protocols in place amid the pandemic.

This was a show where going escapist just did not make sense. Our characters would be people in a very interesting, tough spot. There was some feeling that we should set multiple episodes in the early period — March, April, May. We definitely wanted to have an episode where we saw [the pandemic] start. We ultimately decided we should not spend too long on the beginning of the pandemic because the whole thing about the pandemic is its constant presence, it being this shadow in people's lives.

— Owen Ellickson on creating an episode surrounding the early stages of the COVID-19 pandemic

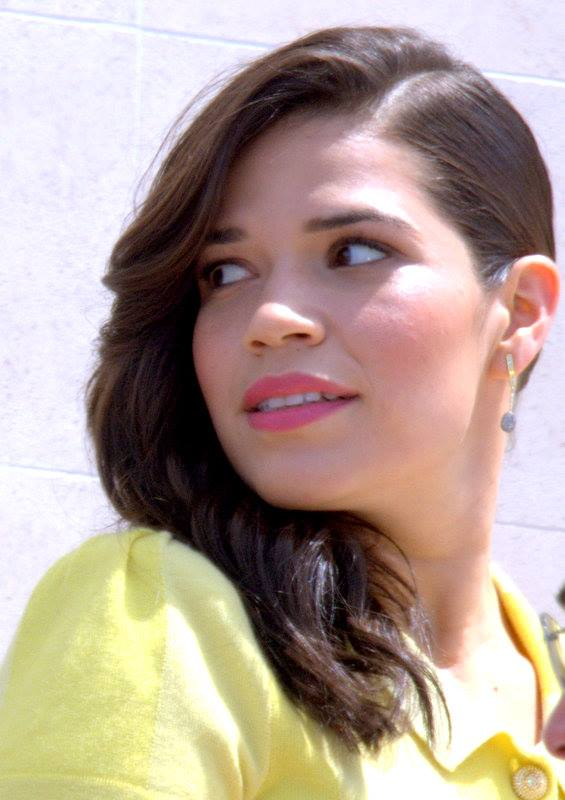
America Ferrera returned for the finale after leaving at the start of the season.

During production, multiple showrunners, writers, and lead actors questioned whether it was the right choice to make a season about the COVID-19 pandemic. In March 2020, producers decided that the topic had to be mentioned due to the show's characters being essential workers, with Superstore serving as a "guinea pig" for Universal Television, producers of the series, to test the idea. This resulted in the creation of a "time jump" in the premiere episode set around various events during the pandemic. Furthermore, writers on the show decided to feature face masks as a key element for the season. However, this resulted in problems with "every single department" during production, causing producer/actor Ben Feldman and actress Lauren Ash to have a session "to test every kind of mask". At one point, face shields were considered but were rejected due to reflections that appeared on cameras. After watching a rough cut of episode 4, writer Owen Ellickson said that the presence of masks felt "brutal" to watch onscreen.

After filming nine episodes by November 25, the show's crew was informed that the sixth season would be the last for Superstore, with the official announcement being released on December 3, 2020. After being in production for several months, the table read for the final episode occurred over Zoom on February 19, 2021, and filming concluded later in the week on February 28; the final scene shot for the series involved the main characters watching their job interviews, and the crew put together a compilation video of highlights and outtakes in lieu of a traditional wrap party. Soon after, NBC revealed that Superstore would conclude on March 25, 2021, with a one-hour series finale, and that Ferrera would return in the final episode. On the decision to bring Ferrera back to the series, Superstore creator Justin Spitzer told Deadline Hollywood that "It was the first question we asked ourselves. As soon as we were told that the show was ending, we called her [...] and she was immediately on board. It just felt the series finale would not have felt like the end without her. We knew we wanted her to come back to the end of this."

== Release and reception ==
=== Broadcast ===
Following its renewal, on September 24, 2020, NBC announced that the sixth season of Superstore would begin airing on October 29, 2020, a change from its original scheduled October 22 premiere. Furthermore, its first five episodes aired on Thursdays at 8:00 pm (Eastern), before airing at 8:30 pm from the sixth episode on January 14, 2021.

=== Critical response ===
On review aggregator Rotten Tomatoes, the sixth season of Superstore holds an approval rating of 92% based on 12 reviews, with an average rating of 9.75/10. The website's critical consensus reads, "As funny and poignant as ever, Superstore closes up shop with a superb sixth season that solidifies its place as one of TVs greatest workplace comedies."

In Entertainment Weekly, Darren Franich said that the season premiere was "instant history with big laughs", as it covered major events that occurred during the COVID-19 pandemic in a humorous way, and called it "a high for the series." Writing for The Verge, Joshua Rivera also complimented the episode, and the start of the season, for being able to tackle the pandemic in a humorous way. From Slate, Rebecca Onion simply called the premiere a "time capsule of pandemic humor", while The Sydney Morning Herald's Brad Newsome described the sixth season of Superstore as a "challenging comedy that's still clever enough to raise a chuckle".

Further reviews after the conclusion of the series with the airing of its one-hour finale were also positive. Ben Travers, from IndieWire, wrote that the series as a whole was not "short on ideas", comparing it the overall premise of The Office. Writing for The A.V. Club, Saloni Gajjar stated that the series finale was able to provide "sweet closure" along with "some hopeful happy endings for all its central characters". Lauding the season and the show as a whole for its characters, Kelly Lawler from USA Today said Superstore was unsuccessful in gaining popularity among shows such as Parks and Recreation and Community, writing that "We probably won't miss the store, but we'll miss its employees dearly." Vulture journalist Kovie Biakolo praised the series for its representation of the working class without reducing their characters to simply those traits, summarizing the season as being able to "exhibit a genuine picture of working-class life: wide-ranging, nuanced, and always meeting at a myriad of intersections."

=== Ratings ===
Viewership and ratings per episode of Superstore season 6
No.	Title	Air date	Rating (18–49)	Viewers (millions)	DVR (18–49)	DVR viewers (millions)	Total (18–49)	Total viewers (millions)	Ref.
1	"Essential"	October 29, 2020	0.6	2.80	0.3	0.89	0.9	3.69	
2	"California (Part 2)"	November 5, 2020	0.5	2.24	0.3	0.71	0.8	2.96	
3	"Floor Supervisor"	November 12, 2020	0.5	2.35	0.4	0.94	0.9	3.29	
4	"Prize Wheel"	November 19, 2020	0.5	2.28	—N/a	—N/a	—N/a	—N/a	
5	"Hair Care Products"	January 14, 2021	0.5	2.51	0.3	0.85	0.8	3.36	
6	"Biscuit"	January 21, 2021	0.4	2.21	0.2	0.64	0.6	2.85	(Note: Live +7 ratings were not available, so Live +3 ratings have been used instead.)
7	"The Trough"	January 28, 2021	0.4	2.05	—N/a	—N/a	—N/a	—N/a	
8	"Ground Rules"	February 4, 2021	0.5	2.22	0.2	0.51	0.6	2.73	
9	"Conspiracy"	February 11, 2021	0.4	1.93	—N/a	—N/a	—N/a	—N/a	
10	"Depositions"	February 25, 2021	0.5	1.90	0.3	0.81	0.7	2.71	
11	"Deep Cleaning"	March 4, 2021	0.4	2.30	0.3	0.79	0.7	3.09	
12	"Customer Satisfaction"	March 11, 2021	0.4	1.87	0.3	—N/a	0.6	—N/a	
13	"Lowell Anderson"	March 18, 2021	0.5	2.33	TBD	TBD	TBD	TBD	
14	"Perfect Store"	March 25, 2021	0.6	2.71	TBD	TBD	TBD	TBD	
15	"All Sales Final"	March 25, 2021	0.5	2.41	TBD	TBD	TBD	TBD	
