= List of Superstore episodes =

List of episodes of American television series Superstore

Superstore is an American comedy television series created by Justin Spitzer, which premiered on NBC on November 30, 2015. The series stars America Ferrera, Ben Feldman, Lauren Ash, Colton Dunn, Nico Santos, Nichole Sakura, Kaliko Kauahi, and Mark McKinney as a group of employees working at a fictional big-box store called "Cloud 9" set in St. Louis, Missouri. On February 11, 2020, the series was renewed for a 15-episode sixth season, which premiered on October 29, 2020. In December 2020, NBC announced that the sixth season would serve as the final season.

During the course of the series, 113 episodes of Superstore aired, concluding on March 25, 2021.

== Series overview ==
Season	Episodes	Originally released	
Season	Episodes	First released	Last released
1	11	November 30, 2015	February 22, 2016
2	22	August 19, 2016	May 4, 2017
3	22	September 28, 2017	May 3, 2018
4	22	October 4, 2018	May 16, 2019
5	21	September 26, 2019	April 23, 2020
6	15	October 29, 2020	March 25, 2021

== Episodes ==
=== Season 1 (2015–16) ===
No. overall	No. in season	Title	Directed by	Written by	Original release date	U.S. viewers (millions)
1	1	"Pilot"	Ruben Fleischer	Justin Spitzer	November 30, 2015	7.21
2	2	"Magazine Profile"	Michael Patrick Jann	Matt Hubbard	November 30, 2015	5.35
3	3	"Shots and Salsa"	Ruben Fleischer	Justin Spitzer	November 30, 2015 (Online); December 28, 2015 (NBC)	2.62
4	4	"Mannequin"	Victor Nelli, Jr.	Jonathan Green & Gabe Miller	January 4, 2016	6.04
5	5	"Shoplifter"	Ruben Fleischer	Jackie Clarke	January 11, 2016	5.38
6	6	"Secret Shopper"	Alex Hardcastle	Lon Zimmet	January 18, 2016	5.66
7	7	"Color Wars"	Andy Ackerman	Jack Kukoda	January 25, 2016	4.93
8	8	"Wedding Day Sale"	Victor Nelli, Jr.	Sierra Teller Ornelas	February 1, 2016	4.89
9	9	"All-Nighter"	Christine Gernon	Eric Ledgin	February 8, 2016	5.19
10	10	"Demotion"	Linda Mendoza	Matt Hubbard & Lon Zimmet	February 15, 2016	3.89
11	11	"Labor"	Beth McCarthy-Miller	Owen Ellickson	February 22, 2016	4.68

=== Season 2 (2016–17) ===
No. overall	No. in season	Title	Directed by	Written by	Original release date	US viewers (millions)
12	1	"Olympics"	Ruben Fleischer	Jonathan Green	August 19, 2016	9.67
13	2	"Strike"	Victor Nelli, Jr.	Jackie Clarke	September 22, 2016	5.45
14	3	"Back to Work"	Michael McDonald	Eric Ledgin	September 29, 2016	4.39
15	4	"Guns, Pills and Birds"	Matt Sohn	Matt Hubbard	October 6, 2016	5.18
16	5	"Spokesman Scandal"	Ken Whittingham	Gabe Miller	October 13, 2016	4.39
17	6	"Dog Adoption Day"	Betsy Thomas	Josh Malmuth	October 20, 2016	4.18
18	7	"Halloween Theft"	Alisa Statman	Karey Dornetto	October 27, 2016	4.21
19	8	"Election Day"	Tristram Shapeero	Bridget Kyle & Vicky Luu	November 3, 2016	3.58
20	9	"Seasonal Help"	Geeta V. Patel	Jackie Clarke	November 10, 2016	4.01
21	10	"Black Friday"	Victor Nelli Jr.	Eric Ledgin	November 10, 2016	3.79
22	11	"Lost and Found"	Jay Chandrasekhar	Sierra Teller Ornelas	January 5, 2017	4.43
23	12	"Rebranding"	Bill Purple	Matt Hubbard	January 12, 2017	4.33
24	13	"Ladies' Lunch"	Todd Biermann	Vanessa Ramos	February 2, 2017	3.99
25	14	"Valentine's Day"	Tristram Shapeero	John Kazlauskas	February 9, 2017	3.54
26	15	"Super Hot Store"	Michael Spiller	Joe Barrasas	February 16, 2017	3.67
27	16	"Wellness Fair"	Alex Reid	Owen Ellickson	February 23, 2017	3.51
28	17	"Integrity Award"	Linda Mendoza	Gabe Miller	March 16, 2017	4.17
29	18	"Mateo's Last Day"	America Ferrera	Jonathan Green	March 23, 2017	4.15
30	19	"Glenn's Kids"	Ruben Fleischer	Sierra Teller Ornelas	April 6, 2017	3.08
31	20	"Spring Cleaning"	Geeta V. Patel	Josh Malmuth	April 20, 2017	3.15
32	21	"Cheyenne's Wedding"	Michael Weaver	Story by : Vanessa Ramos; Teleplay by : Bridget Kyle & Vicky Luu	April 27, 2017	2.77
33	22	"Tornado"	Matt Sohn	Justin Spitzer	May 4, 2017	2.91

=== Season 3 (2017–18) ===
No. overall	No. in season	Title	Directed by	Written by	Original release date	U.S. viewers (millions)
34	1	"Grand Re-Opening"	Matt Sohn	Justin Spitzer	September 28, 2017	4.60
35	2	"Brett's Dead"	Ryan Case	Sierra Teller Ornelas	October 5, 2017	4.45
36	3	"Part-Time Hires"	Todd Biermann	Josh Malmuth	October 12, 2017	4.33
37	4	"Workplace Bullying"	Tristram Shapeero	Bridget Kyle & Vicky Luu	October 19, 2017	4.20
38	5	"Sal's Dead"	Geeta V. Patel	Gabe Miller	October 26, 2017	4.61
39	6	"Health Fund"	Victor Nelli Jr.	Jackie Clarke	November 2, 2017	3.54
40	7	"Christmas Eve"	Todd Biermann	Eric Ledgin	December 5, 2017	4.41
41	8	"Viral Video"	Ken Whittingham	Jonathan Green	January 4, 2018	3.90
42	9	"Golden Globes Party"	Victor Nelli Jr.	Vanessa Ramos	January 11, 2018	3.83
43	10	"High Volume Store"	Jay Hunter	Owen Ellickson	January 18, 2018	3.57
44	11	"Angels and Mermaids"	Michael Spiller	Justin Shanes	January 25, 2018	4.23
45	12	"Groundhog Day"	Jaffar Mahmood	Sierra Teller Ornelas	February 1, 2018	3.43
46	13	"Video Game Release"	America Ferrera	Jackie Clarke	March 1, 2018	3.38
47	14	"Safety Training"	Rebecca Asher	Bridget Kyle & Vicky Luu	March 8, 2018	3.37
48	15	"Amnesty"	Keith Powell	Eric Ledgin	March 15, 2018	3.93
49	16	"Target"	Daniella Eisman	Jonathan Green & Gabe Miller	March 22, 2018	3.85
50	17	"District Manager"	Alex Reid	John Kazlauskas	March 29, 2018	2.96
51	18	"Local Vendors Day"	Geeta V. Patel	Josh Malmuth	April 5, 2018	3.17
52	19	"Lottery"	Ben Feldman	Vanessa Ramos	April 12, 2018	3.08
53	20	"Gender Reveal"	Tristram Shapeero	Lauren Ash	April 19, 2018	2.76
54	21	"Aftermath"	Ryan Case	Justin Shanes & Owen Ellickson	April 26, 2018	2.85
55	22	"Town Hall"	Matt Sohn	Story by : Justin Spitzer; Teleplay by : Jonathan Green & Gabe Miller	May 3, 2018	2.97

=== Season 4 (2018–19) ===
No. overall	No. in season	Title	Directed by	Written by	Original release date	U.S. viewers (millions)
56	1	"Back to School"	Matt Sohn	Jonathan Green	October 4, 2018	3.16
57	2	"Baby Shower"	Jeffrey Blitz	Bridget Kyle & Vicky Luu	October 11, 2018	3.01
58	3	"Toxic Workplace"	Jay Karas	Aaron Lee	October 18, 2018	3.16
59	4	"Costume Competition"	Todd Biermann	Justin Shanes	October 25, 2018	3.06
60	5	"Delivery Day"	Daniella Eisman	Gabe Miller	November 1, 2018	3.21
61	6	"Maternity Leave"	Jackie Clarke	Jackie Clarke	November 8, 2018	3.27
62	7	"New Initiative"	Ken Whittingham	Ben Dougan	November 15, 2018	3.31
63	8	"Managers' Conference"	Phil Traill	Brian Gatewood & Alessandro Tanaka	December 6, 2018	3.36
64	9	"Shadowing Glenn"	Geeta V. Patel	Matt Lawton	December 13, 2018	2.98
65	10	"Cloud 9 Academy"	Jeffrey Blitz	John Kazlauskas	March 7, 2019	3.07
66	11	"Steps Challenge"	Todd Biermann	Bridget Kyle & Vicky Luu	March 14, 2019	3.26
67	12	"Blizzard"	Amy York Rubin	Dayo Adesokan	March 21, 2019	3.86
68	13	"Love Birds"	Mark McKinney	Aaron Lee	March 28, 2019	3.38
69	14	"Minor Crimes"	Ross Novie	L.E. Correia	April 4, 2019	3.11
70	15	"Salary"	James Renfroe	Ben Dougan & Matt Lawton	April 11, 2019	3.37
71	16	"Easter"	Victor Nelli, Jr.	Story by : John Kazlaukas; Teleplay by : Brian Gatewood & Alessandro Tanaka	April 18, 2019	3.04
72	17	"Quinceañera"	Rebecca Asher	Justin Shanes	April 25, 2019	2.95
73	18	"Cloud Green"	Heather Jack	Jonathan Green & Gabe Miller	May 2, 2019	3.01
74	19	"Scanners"	Victor Nelli, Jr.	Dayo Adesokan & L.E. Correia	May 9, 2019	2.91
75	20	"#Cloud9Fail"	Betsy Thomas	John Kazlauskas & Josh Malmuth	May 9, 2019	2.46
76	21	"Sandra's Fight"	America Ferrera	Sean Lee & Jen Vierck	May 16, 2019	2.38
77	22	"Employee Appreciation Day"	Jeffrey Blitz	Justin Spitzer	May 16, 2019	1.95

=== Season 5 (2019–20) ===
No. overall	No. in season	Title	Directed by	Written by	Original release date	U.S. viewers (millions)
78	1	"Cloud 9.0"	Jackie Clarke	Jackie Clarke	September 26, 2019	2.86
79	2	"Testimonials"	Matt Sohn	Bridget Kyle & Vicky Luu	October 3, 2019	2.78
80	3	"Forced Hire"	Victor Nelli, Jr.	Colton Dunn	October 10, 2019	2.79
81	4	"Mall Closing"	Rebecca Asher	Owen Ellickson	October 17, 2019	2.94
82	5	"Self-Care"	Richie Keen	Rene Gube	October 24, 2019	2.84
83	6	"Trick-or-Treat"	Heather Jack	Laura McCreary	October 31, 2019	3.09
84	7	"Shoplifter Rehab"	Chioke Nassor	Justin Shanes	November 7, 2019	2.61
85	8	"Toy Drive"	Jay Hunter	Dayo Adesokan	November 14, 2019	2.76
86	9	"Curbside Pickup"	Catalina Aguilar Mastretta	John Kazlauskas	November 21, 2019	2.65
87	10	"Negotiations"	Betsy Thomas	L.E. Correia	December 12, 2019	2.67
88	11	"Lady Boss"	America Ferrera	Jackie Clarke	January 9, 2020	2.59
89	12	"Myrtle"	Tristram Shapeero	Hailey Chavez	January 16, 2020	2.67
90	13	"Favoritism"	Robert Cohen	Bridget Kyle & Vicky Luu	January 23, 2020	2.73
91	14	"Sandra's Wedding"	Ruben Fleischer	Owen Ellickson	January 30, 2020	2.78
92	15	"Cereal Bar"	Kris Lefcoe	Laura McCreary	February 13, 2020	2.35
93	16	"Employee App"	Justin Spitzer	Justin Shanes	February 20, 2020	2.63
94	17	"Zephra Cares"	Victor Nelli, Jr.	Rene Gube	February 27, 2020	2.57
95	18	"Playdate"	Matt Sohn	Jen Vierck	March 19, 2020	3.59
96	19	"Carol's Back"	Ben Feldman	John Kazlauskas	March 26, 2020	3.41
97	20	"Customer Safari"	Jay Karas	L.E. Correia	April 2, 2020	3.15
98	21	"California (Part 1)"	Betsy Thomas	Dayo Adesokan	April 23, 2020	3.01

=== Season 6 (2020–21) ===
No. overall	No. in season	Title	Directed by	Written by	Original release date	U.S. viewers (millions)
99	1	"Essential"	Victor Nelli, Jr.	Bridget Kyle & Vicky Luu	October 29, 2020	2.80
100	2	"California (Part 2)"	Victor Nelli, Jr.	Owen Ellickson	November 5, 2020	2.24
101	3	"Floor Supervisor"	Betsy Thomas	Josh Malmuth	November 12, 2020	2.35
102	4	"Prize Wheel"	Ryan Case	Laura McCreary	November 19, 2020	2.28
103	5	"Hair Care Products"	Charles Stone III	Dayo Adesokan	January 14, 2021	2.51
104	6	"Biscuit"	Jay Hunter	Justin Shanes	January 21, 2021	2.21
105	7	"The Trough"	Kim Nguyen	Rene Gube	January 28, 2021	2.05
106	8	"Ground Rules"	Victor Nelli, Jr.	Jen Vierck	February 4, 2021	2.22
107	9	"Conspiracy"	James Renfroe	Colton Dunn	February 11, 2021	1.93
108	10	"Depositions"	Betsy Thomas	John Kazlauskas	February 25, 2021	1.90
109	11	"Deep Cleaning"	Ross Novie	Hailey Chavez	March 4, 2021	2.30
110	12	"Customer Satisfaction"	Matt Sohn	Bridget Kyle & Vicky Luu	March 11, 2021	1.87
111	13	"Lowell Anderson"	Kabir Akhtar	Rene Gube & Josh Malmuth	March 18, 2021	2.33
112	14	"Perfect Store"	Victor Nelli, Jr.	Owen Ellickson & Laura McCreary	March 25, 2021	2.71
113	15	"All Sales Final"	Ruben Fleischer	Teleplay by : Jonathan Green & Gabe Miller; Story by : Justin Spitzer	March 25, 2021	2.41

== Ratings ==
Superstore : U.S. viewers per episode (millions)

Season	Episode number																						Average
Season	1	2	3	4	5	6	7	8	9	10	11	12	13	14	15	16	17	18	19	20	21	22	Average
1	7.21	5.35	2.62	6.04	5.38	5.66	4.93	4.89	5.19	3.89	4.68	–											5.08
2	9.67	5.45	4.39	5.18	4.39	4.18	4.21	3.58	4.01	3.79	4.43	4.33	3.99	3.54	3.67	3.51	4.17	4.15	3.08	3.15	2.77	2.91	4.21
3	4.60	4.45	4.33	4.20	4.61	3.54	4.41	3.90	3.83	3.57	4.23	3.43	3.38	3.37	3.93	3.85	2.96	3.17	3.08	2.76	2.85	2.97	3.70
4	3.16	3.01	3.16	3.06	3.21	3.27	3.31	3.36	2.98	3.07	3.26	3.86	3.38	3.11	3.37	3.04	2.95	3.01	2.91	2.46	2.38	1.95	3.06
5	2.86	2.78	2.79	2.94	2.84	3.09	2.61	2.76	2.65	2.67	2.59	2.67	2.73	2.78	2.35	2.63	2.57	3.59	3.41	3.15	3.01	–	2.83
6	2.80	2.24	2.35	2.28	2.51	2.21	2.05	2.22	1.93	1.90	2.30	1.87	2.33	2.71	2.41	–							2.27

Audience measurement performed by Nielsen Media Research
