= Superstore season 5 =

Season of television series

Superstore
- Season 5
- Promotional poster.
- Starring: America Ferrera; Ben Feldman; Lauren Ash; Colton Dunn; Nico Santos; Nichole Bloom; Kaliko Kauahi; Mark McKinney
- No. of episodes: 21

Release
- Original network: NBC
- Original release: September 26, 2019 – April 23, 2020

Season chronology
- ← Previous; Season 4 Next → Season 6

The fifth season of Superstore, the American television series, was ordered on March 4, 2019 and filming began in August 2019. The season premiered on September 26, 2019 on NBC. The series continues to air on its Thursday at 8:00 PM timeslot. The season was set to contain 22 episodes, but production was shut down after the completion of the 21st episode due to the COVID-19 pandemic.

Superstore follows a group of employees working at Cloud 9, a fictional big-box store in St. Louis, Missouri. The ensemble and supporting cast feature America Ferrera, Ben Feldman, Lauren Ash, Colton Dunn, Nico Santos, Nichole Bloom, Mark McKinney, and Kaliko Kauahi. Kauahi joins the regular cast after being credited as a recurring character in seasons 1–4.

== Cast ==
=== Main ===
- America Ferrera as Amy Sosa
- Ben Feldman as Jonah Simms
- Lauren Ash as Dina Fox
- Colton Dunn as Garrett McNeil
- Nico Santos as Mateo Fernando Aquino Liwanag
- Nichole Bloom as Cheyenne Thompson
- Kaliko Kauahi as Sandra Kaluiokalani
- Mark McKinney as Glenn Sturgis

=== Recurring ===
- Jon Barinholtz as Marcus White
- Kelly Stables as Kelly Watson
- Kelly Schumann as Justine Sikowitz
- Irene White as Carol
- Amir M. Korangy as Sayid
- Linda Porter as Myrtle Vartanian
- Michael Bunin as Jeff Sutton
- Chris Grace as Jerry
- Justina Machado as Maya Fonseca
- David Wain as Dan the Optometrist
- Rory Scovel as Dr. Brian Patterson, Dina's new boyfriend

=== Guest cast ===
- Johnny Pemberton as Bo Derek Thompson
- Heidi Gardner as Colleen
- Kerri Kenney-Silver as Jerusha Sturgis
- Jerry Minor as Richard
- Fred Armisen as Kyle
- George Salazar as Eric Sosa
- Ian Gomez as Herb
- Dean Norris as Howard Fox
- Scott MacArthur as Benny
- Jason Ritter as Josh Simms, Jonah's brother
- Fred Melamed as Richard Simms, Jonah's father
- Meagen Fay as Marilyn Simms, Jonah's mother

== Episodes ==
No. overall	No. in season	Title	Directed by	Written by	Original release date	U.S. viewers (millions)
78	1	"Cloud 9.0"	Jackie Clarke	Jackie Clarke	September 26, 2019	2.86
One week after Mateo’s ICE detainment, Dina, Marcus and a reluctant Garrett concoct a plan to break Mateo out. Amy grows concerned about Cheyenne as she hasn’t visited Mateo. Meanwhile, corporate introduces a new Cloud 9 robot floor cleaner, much to the employees' dismay as it might steal their jobs. Also, Sandra wants to tell everyone about her engagement to Jerry, but no one will listen. Amy's name tag: Amanda
79	2	"Testimonials"	Matt Sohn	Bridget Kyle & Vicky Luu	October 3, 2019	2.78
Amy rallies the employees together as Mateo’s deportation lawyer comes to Cloud 9 for testimony in Mateo’s defense. Jeff mentions that corporate only went after Mateo upon learning the Ozark Highlands employees were threatening to unionize, but is afraid to testify to this for fear of losing his job. Meanwhile, after repeated denials from Dina, Sandra is convinced that she’s throwing her a surprise engagement party. Jonah goes behind Dina’s back and tries to organize a party. Also, Cheyenne holds auditions for who should take Mateo’s work locker. Amy's name tag: Maureen
80	3	"Forced Hire"	Victor Nelli, Jr.	Colton Dunn	October 10, 2019	2.79
After discovering that her nemesis Colleen (Heidi Gardner) was transferred to the Ozark Highlands store, Dina blackmails Garrett into getting Colleen to quit. Mateo visits the store and immediately finds himself fixing others' mistakes, ending up working an unpaid day. Glenn and Cheyenne get annoyed with Mateo as he begins to take things too far. Meanwhile, Jonah is forced to hang out with Marcus and the rest of the warehouse crew to get them back on the side of unionizing. Also, Sandra continues to plan for her wedding, albeit on company time. Amy's name tag: Remeny
81	4	"Mall Closing"	Rebecca Asher	Owen Ellickson	October 17, 2019	2.94
Amy announces that the local mall is closing and to expect heavier foot traffic and increased sales, especially from teenagers. Amy soon discovers that Emma is one of the teenagers, and goes to great lengths to not be boring around her daughter's friends. Dina, on the other hand wants to kick everyone out when she notices the teenagers just want to hang out and not buy anything. Meanwhile, Cheyenne discovers that she's not as cool and trendy as she thought she was, while it's the opposite for Sandra as teenagers want to hang out with her. Jonah and Garrett try to trick Mateo into taking a loan while the latter looks for a job. Also, Carol returns to Cloud 9 with a new lease on life. Amy's name tag: Penelope
82	5	"Self-Care"	Richie Keen	Rene Gube	October 24, 2019	2.84
After a series of days in which she worked too hard, Jonah and Cheyenne suggest that Amy should take a nap during work. Trying to cover for Amy, Cheyenne takes a call from an inspector who wants to visit the store a day earlier than planned, with the inspector arriving while the store is a mess. Meanwhile, after Glenn is diagnosed with diabetes, Dina takes control of his diet. Also, Mateo is able to obtain a new position at Cloud 9 as an eye care assistant upon learning that the optical company is separate therefrom, but the optometrist, aware of his new subordinate's undocumented status, blackmails him into becoming his life coach. Amy's name tag: Ollie / Khay
83	6	"Trick-or-Treat"	Heather Jack	Laura McCreary	October 31, 2019	3.09
It’s Halloween time at Cloud 9, and as Amy and Jonah are close to a unionization vote, the new District Manager, Maya, comes to the store. Amy does everything in her power to distract Maya, but things get complicated when Kelly arrives from the Fenton store to drop off their signed union cards and Maya recognizes her. Garrett and Glenn manage the store's haunted house, and Garrett has some fun when Glenn loses his phone and is afraid to go back in. Meanwhile, Marcus wears a complicated dragon outfit, only to be told that the store no longer runs a costume contest. Also, Cheyenne and Mateo judge all the employees to see which one could be a serial killer that's in the news. Amy's name tag: None (in Halloween costume)
84	7	"Shoplifter Rehab"	Chioke Nassor	Justin Shanes	November 7, 2019	2.61
As District Manager Maya continues to observe the store, Jonah and Glenn come up with a plan to make Amy look like a tough store manager and to gain control and respect of the employees. Maya invites Amy to lunch, where she proceeds to tell Amy that she has a great chance to move up with Cloud 9, but not if she's sympathetic to the union movement. Meanwhile, Dina asks Mateo to help her out with an anti-shoplifter seminar. Also, Sandra gets some unexpected bonding time with Carol. Amy's name tag: Mariko
85	8	"Toy Drive"	Jay Hunter	Dayo Adesokan	November 14, 2019	2.76
Amy and Jonah come up with an idea to have Mateo run a toy donation drive for needy kids so he will look good at his deportation hearing. At the same time, a representative from another charity (Fred Armisen) takes business away from Mateo, forcing a string of escalated retaliations to occur. Meanwhile, Sandra asks Glenn to officiate for her upcoming wedding. Also, after being dumped by Colleen, Garrett tries to hide that fact from both Dina and Cheyenne. Amy's name tag: Olufunmi
86	9	"Curbside Pickup"	Catalina Aguilar Mastretta	John Kazlauskas	November 21, 2019	2.65
Amy announces that corporate has introduced the new Cloud 9 Curbside Pickup option for customers, and asks Dina to run the operations along with Jonah and Cheyenne. Things immediately get out of control when numerous orders come in, making them almost impossible to fulfill within the 30 minute promise time. Later on, Dina takes it upon herself to run the service and prove it can be done. Meanwhile, Amy’s brother Eric has been in town for over two weeks, so she pushes him to date Mateo to get him out of her house. Also, Sandra asks Garrett to spend quality time with her fiancé Jerry. Amy's name tag: Jackie
87	10	"Negotiations"	Betsy Thomas	L.E. Correia	December 12, 2019	2.67
Jonah and Sandra travel to Chicago to negotiate a labor contract with corporate. Back in the store, Mateo, Glenn and Garrett have a competition to see who can sell the most useless items to customers. While waiting for news from the union meeting, Amy, Dina and Cheyenne chop down a pine tree outside the store to use for a Christmas display, but they drop it on a transformer unit which causes a blackout. The episode ends with corporate accepting the proposal from Jonah and Sandra. However, Amy receives news from Maya that the Cloud 9 company has been bought out, and the new owners will not recognize any existing labor contracts. Amy's name tag: Courtney
88	11	"Lady Boss"	America Ferrera	Jackie Clarke	January 9, 2020	2.59
Following the acquisition of Cloud 9 by Zephra, the employees begin to jump to conclusions regarding the fate of their ongoing employment. Amy stresses out when produce orders fail to arrive, and begins searching for a new floor supervisor with her sights set on Glenn. Meanwhile, searching for a cause after the failed union efforts, Jonah sets up a mannequin display that comes across as pro-feminist. Led by Marcus, the men start to feel threatened, and take a stand for masculinity in the store. Also, Sandra recruits Dina and Garrett to break the news to Carol that she's not invited to the wedding, with those efforts ultimately backfiring. Amy's name tag: Jamie
89	12	"Myrtle"	Tristram Shapeero	Hailey Chavez	January 16, 2020	2.67
The employees at Cloud 9 mourn the loss of fellow employee Myrtle. Jonah is shocked to discover that Myrtle left him $1,000. Feeling guilty about having the money, Jonah gives it to Glenn to use for funeral costs, but learns he’s giving all the money to his pastor (who asserts he can help ensure Myrtle will get into heaven). Meanwhile, Dina reunites with her father, thinking that he has changed, but soon discovers he's still the same guy. Also, Cheyenne ropes Mateo into a pyramid scheme. Amy's name tag: Anis / Kimia
90	13	"Favoritism"	Robert Cohen	Bridget Kyle & Vicky Luu	January 23, 2020	2.73
When Amy announces that Jonah is being given time off for a corporate meeting and that Mateo is going to replace Myrtle as her new assistant, Marcus and several other employees accuse Amy of showing favoritism in certain cases. Many (Marcus included) ask her to interview them for the assistant position, and Amy is surprised by the results. Meanwhile, Dina and Glenn, now the floor supervisor, clash over who has higher authority when they ask Sandra to set up a display of new Zephra products. Also, Jonah tries to bond with Garrett to prove he is still one of the guys, but ends up causing a rift between Garrett and his friend Randy. Amy's name tag: Helen
91	14	"Sandra's Wedding"	Ruben Fleischer	Owen Ellickson	January 30, 2020	2.78
It’s Sandra’s wedding day and as her maid of honor, Dina is on full alert when she sees signs that Carol is plotting something to ruin the ceremony. With Dina occupied, Amy steps in to assist Sandra by setting up decorations. Jonah has a talk with a catering employee about their pay rate and mentions his Raise the Wage group, which inspires the catering staff to walk out. Meanwhile, Garrett struggles to come up with a best man speech after Glenn steals his. Also, Mateo hesitates to start a new relationship with Amy's brother Eric after being embarrassed by his ankle monitor sounding an alarm. Amy's name tag: None (Sandra's wedding)
92	15	"Cereal Bar"	Kris Lefcoe	Laura McCreary	February 13, 2020	2.35
When Amy announces that Zephra has installed a new cereal bar for the employees, Jonah has suspicions about what the new Cloud 9 owner’s real intentions are. Meanwhile, Dina enlists help from Cheyenne to take down a man (Scott MacArthur) suspected of return scams, but it becomes difficult after the guy begins flirting with Dina. Also, Garrett tries to trick Glenn into giving him paid time off due to mental distress. Amy's name tag: Lynne
93	16	"Employee App"	Justin Spitzer	Justin Shanes	February 20, 2020	2.63
The privacy of its employees is violated after an employee app begins to track their whereabouts. Amy begins to get annoyed when Dina constantly texts her after she discovers emojis. Jonah begins to get skeptical about the app and pranks Garrett in the process. Amy's name tag: Bern
94	17	"Zephra Cares"	Victor Nelli, Jr.	Rene Gube	February 27, 2020	2.57
Amy’s idea about organizing a charity event involving Zephra is jeopardized when Jeff makes a surprising return. Meanwhile, Glenn lends a helping hand to his fellow employees by stealing some of the charity gift bags. Sandra begins to get uncomfortable around Jonah when he asks her to solicit customers to round up the grocery bill for the same charity. Also, Garrett tries to prove to Dina that he is smarter than her. Amy's name tag: Kimball
95	18	"Playdate"	Matt Sohn	Jen Vierck	March 19, 2020	3.59
Forced to take her son Parker to work, Amy grows tired of the criticism of her parenting, especially from Glenn when Jerusha brings their child Rose. Later on, Amy and Glenn battle against each other to see who has the best parenting skills. Meanwhile, Garrett helps Dina plan her first date with new boyfriend Brian after discovering that she made unusual arrangements. Also, Sandra and Cheyenne set out to see if Jonah might be the father of Amy’s child Parker instead of her ex-husband Adam. Amy's name tag: Mary
96	19	"Carol's Back"	Ben Feldman	John Kazlauskas	March 26, 2020	3.41
After Carol returns to work following her suspension for trying to kill Sandra's cat, Amy struggles to rally the employees, given that they all still fear Carol. Meanwhile, Jonah and Cheyenne attend a "Raise the Wage" rally, wherein Cheyenne convinces Jonah that he looks too much like a "narc" to the other protesters. Also, after being assigned to clean the back stock room, Garrett and Mateo use a temp app to get someone else to do the labor. Amy's name tag: Effie
97	20	"Customer Safari"	Jay Karas	L.E. Correia	April 2, 2020	3.15
As Amy takes a day off to have lunch with Jonah's family and Dina has an in-store lunch with new fling Brian, Garrett rallies the employees to play a game of "customer safari" wherein they take pictures of the weirdest customers to earn points. Acting manager Glenn knows something is going on, but is clueless to stop it, so Dina enlists Brian to help her expose the game. At their lunch, Amy urges Jonah to stand up to his condescending brother, Josh (Jason Ritter), which leads to Jonah's parents splitting while Josh's girlfriend leaves him. When Amy returns to work, she gets a phone call and learns that Maya recommended her for a corporate director position in Palo Alto, California. Amy's name tag: Maggie
98	21	"California (Part 1)"	Betsy Thomas	Dayo Adesokan	April 23, 2020	3.01
After being recommended for a corporate job in California, Amy asks Dina to not tell Jonah that she's going. Meanwhile, it's Cheyenne's 21st birthday and Mateo makes suggestions on what to do for her party. Deciding that Mateo's suggestions are lame, Cheyenne turns to Bo for his ideas, which are wildly different. Having heard that Sandra is considering adopting a child, Glenn asks her to foster a 17-year-old, much to her dismay. After Jonah learns about Amy's interview and subsequent decision to accept the job, Jonah reveals that he wants to move to California with her. Amy's name tag: Wunmi

== Production ==
=== Casting ===
In season 5, Kaliko Kauahi, who had portrayed Sandra Kaluiokalani since the first season, was promoted to series regular. Justina Machado joined the cast as a recurring character, playing the new district manager Maya. Heidi Gardner was cast as Dina's nemesis Colleen.

=== America Ferrera’s departure ===
After NBC had initially announced the sixth season renewal of the series, the network revealed on February 28, 2020, that series star America Ferrera would be departing at the end of the fifth season, citing she has new projects and wants to spend more time with her family. However, due to season 5 production being halted by the COVID-19 pandemic, Ferrera returned to finish the story of Amy's departure in season 6.

=== Promotional consideration ===
Episode 17 contained promotional consideration which was furnished by Microsoft.

== Ratings ==
Viewership and ratings per episode of Superstore season 5
No.	Title	Air date	Rating/share (18–49)	Viewers (millions)	DVR (18–49)	Total (18–49)
1	"Cloud 9.0"	September 26, 2019	0.8/4	2.86	0.4	1.2
2	"Testimonials"	October 3, 2019	0.8/4	2.78	0.4	1.1
3	"Forced Hire"	October 10, 2019	0.8/4	2.79	—N/a	—N/a
4	"Mall Closing"	October 17, 2019	0.8/4	2.94	0.5	1.3
5	"Self-Care"	October 24, 2019	0.8/4	2.84	0.3	1.1
6	"Trick-or-Treat"	October 31, 2019	0.7/4	3.09	0.4	1.1
7	"Shoplifter Rehab"	November 7, 2019	0.7/4	2.61	0.4	1.1
8	"Toy Drive"	November 14, 2019	0.8/4	2.76	0.3	1.1
9	"Curbside Pickup"	November 21, 2019	0.7/4	2.65	0.3	1.0
10	"Negotiations"	December 12, 2019	0.6/3	2.67	0.4	1.0
11	"Lady Boss"	January 9, 2020	0.7/3	2.59	0.4	1.0
12	"Myrtle"	January 16, 2020	0.6/4	2.67	0.4	1.0
13	"Favoritism"	January 23, 2020	0.7/4	2.73	0.3	1.0
14	"Sandra’s Wedding"	January 30, 2020	0.7/4	2.78	0.3	1.0
15	"Cereal Bar"	February 13, 2020	0.6	2.35	0.4	1.0
16	"Employee App"	February 20, 2020	0.7	2.63	—N/a	—N/a
17	"Zephra Cares"	February 27, 2020	0.6	2.57	0.3	0.9
18	"Playdate"	March 19, 2020	0.9	3.59	0.4	1.3
19	"Carol's Back"	March 26, 2020	0.9	3.41	—N/a	—N/a
20	"Customer Safari"	April 2, 2020	0.7	3.15	0.3	1.0
21	"California (Part 1)"	April 23, 2020	0.7	3.01	0.3	1.0
