= Calico (disambiguation) =

Calico is a plain-woven cotton textile.

Calico may also refer to:

== Textiles ==
- Calico (American English), the same as chintz

== Plants and animals ==
=== Animals ===
- Calico (goldfish), goldfish that have a type of metallic and transparent scales
- Calico butterfly, a genus of brush-footed butterflies commonly called the crackers, calicoes, or clicks
- Calico cat, a domestic cat, almost always female, with the common three- or four-colored coat pattern calico
- Calico grouper, a species of fish found in Bermuda and the United States

=== Plants ===
- Alternanthera bettzickiana, also known as calico plant
- Aristolochia littoralis, a species of vine also called calico flower
- Flint corn, also called calico corn
- Kalmia latifolia, a species of flowering plant also known as calico-bush
- Loeseliastrum, a genus of flower plants also called calico

== Places ==
- Calico, California, a ghost town restored as a tourist attraction
  - Calico Mountains (California), a mountain range in the Mojave Desert where the ghost town is located
    - Calico Early Man Site, a archaeological site in the mountain range
    - Calico Peaks, mountains within the Calico mountain range
- Calico, North Carolina, an unincorporated community
- Calico, West Virginia, an unincorporated community
- Calico Bay, a bay in North Carolina
- Calico Hills, Humboldt County, Nevada
  - Calico Mountains Wilderness, a wilderness area contained within the hills
- Calico National Recreation Trail, Colorado
- Calico Valley, a valley in Georgia

== People ==
- Tara Calico (born 1969), an American woman who disappeared in 1988
- Tyrone Calico (born 1980), an American football wide receiver
- Calico Cooper (born 1981), an American actress, singer, and dancer, and daughter of the rock and roll musician Alice Cooper and the dancer Sheryl Cooper
- John Rackham (hanged 1720), an English pirate captain in the early 18th century whose likely fictional nickname was calico.
- Calico (footballer) (born 1987), Portuguese footballer

== Arts and entertainment ==
- "Calico", a song from the album Anthology by Alien Ant Farm
- Calico (album), 2023 album by Ryan Beatty
- "Calico", a song from the 1993 album So Tough, by Saint Etienne
- Calico, a fictional research vessel in the 1978-1981 TV series Godzilla
- Dr Calico, a fictional character in the movie Bolt (2008), voiced by Malcolm McDowell
- Calico (board game), a 2020 board game
- "Calico Skies", a song by Paul McCartney's from his 1997 album Flaming Pie
- Calico (comics), a Marvel Comics character and member of the Outliers

== Companies and organizations ==
- Calico (company), subsidiary of Alphabet with a focus on the biology of aging
- CALICO (consortium), an international consortium for information on language learning technology
- Calico Light Weapons Systems, a small firearms manufacturing company currently based in Hillsboro, Oregon
- Calico Mills, one of Ahmedabad's (India) earliest textile mills

== Other uses ==
- Calico Solar Energy Project, a proposed California solar energy plant
- Iowa Central Air Line Railroad, a 19th-century railroad known derisively as the "Calico railroad"

== See also ==
- Calicut (disambiguation), city in India, origin of the word/fabric
