= Kaliko (disambiguation) =

Kaliko may refer to:

- The Keliko people of East Africa
- Euphorbia heterophylla, the kaliko plant
- Kaliko (Oz), a character in the Oz books
- Kaliko, an edge-matching puzzle game played using serpentiles
- Kaliko Kauahi, American actress
- Krizz Kaliko (born 1974), American rapper

== See also ==
- Calico (disambiguation)
