= The District (production company) =

American film production company

- Company type: Privately held company
- Industry: Motion pictures Television
- Founded: June 24, 2014; 11 years ago
- Founder: Ruben Fleischer; David Bernad
- Headquarters: Los Angeles, California, United States

The District is a film and television company started in 2014 by film director Ruben Fleischer and former Rip Cord Productions employee David Bernad.

== History ==
The District was started on June 24, 2014 by film director Ruben Fleischer and Rip Cord Productions employee David Bernard, and it will kick off with a two-year overall deal at Universal Television, allowing it to produce comedies and dramas.

The studio's first production, Superstore, was picked up to series by NBC on May 7, 2015. It eventually become a hit series. Its next project was The Bold Type, which was picked up by Freeform on January 10, 2017.

== Productions ==
=== Film ===
Year	Title	Director	Distributor	Notes
2017	Unicorn Store	Brie Larson	Netflix	co-production with Rip Cord Productions, Rhea Films, Sycamore Pictures, Hercules Film Fund and 51 Entertainment
2021	Bad Trip	Kitao Sakurai	Netflix	co-production with Bron Creative, Orion Pictures, Gorilla Flicks and Helo

=== Television ===
Years	Title	Creator	Network	Notes
2015–2021	Superstore	Justin Spitzer	NBC	co-production with Miller Green Broadcasting (season 5), Spitzer Holding Company, and Universal Television
2017–2021	The Bold Type	Sarah Watson	Freeform	co-production with Sarah Watson Productions and Universal Television
2019–2020	Stumptown	Jason Richman based on Stumptown by: Greg Rucka, Matthew Southworth, Justin Greenwood	ABC	co-production with Don't Tell Mom and ABC Studios
2021–present	The White Lotus	Mike White	HBO	co-production with Pallogram and Rip Cord Productions
2023	Jury Duty	Lee Eisenberg and Gene Stupnitsky	Amazon Freevee	co-production with Picrow, Piece of Work Entertainment and Amazon Studios
2023	White House Plumbers	Alex Gregory and Peter Hyuck	HBO	co-production with wiip and Crash&Salvage
