= Kauahi =

Kauahi is a surname. Notable people with the surname include:

- Kaliko Kauahi (born 1974), American actress
- Kani Kauahi (born 1959), American football coach
