= Calico Railroad =

Calico Railroad may refer to:

- Iowa Central Air Line Railroad, a historic railroad in Iowa, United States
- Waterloo Mining Railroad, a railroad that hauled silver from the mines around Calico, California, United States, from 1888 to 1903
  - Ghost Town & Calico Railroad, a heritage railroad attraction at the Knott's Berry Farm theme park in California, United States, inspired by the Waterloo railroad
