= Supertitlán =

- Genre: Sitcom
- Based on: Superstore by Justin Spitzer
- Developed by: Amaya Muruzábal
- Written by: Joserra Zúñiga; Tania Tinajero
- Directed by: César Rodríguez; Joserra Zúñiga
- Creative directors: Pablo Garza; Pablo Silva González
- Starring: Jesús Zavala; Sofía Espinosa
- Country of origin: Mexico
- Original language: Spanish
- No. of seasons: 1
- No. of episodes: 48

Production
- Executive producers: Karina Blanco; César Rodríguez
- Producers: Suzel Torre Hutt; Celia Iturriaga
- Cinematography: Jaime Andrés Duque; Héctor Maeshiro
- Editors: Edgar Bautista González; José Luis Castellanos
- Running time: 42 minutes
- Production companies: Dopamine; Universal Studio Group

Original release
- Network: Azteca 7
- Release: 30 May – 18 August 2022

Supertitlán is a Mexican television sitcom adapted from the American series Superstore, created by Justin Spitzer. It premiered on Azteca 7 on 30 May 2022. Starring an ensemble cast headed by Jesús Zavala and Sofía Espinosa, Supertitlán follows a group of employees working at a supermarket in Tacubaya, Mexico City.

== Cast ==
=== Main ===
- Jesús Zavala as Jonás Encinas
- Sofía Espinosa as Amelia "Amy"
- Luz Aldán as Diana
- Aldo Escalante as Juan
- Ricardo Peralta as Mateo
- Erika Franco as Michelle
- Azalia Ortiz as Sandra
- Carlos Orozco Plascencia as Gervasio Cárdenas
- Amanda Farah as Remedios
- Laura de Ita as Lola
- Rubén Herrera Díaz as Rafael "Rafita"
- Eugenio Rubio as Adonis
- Harold Azuara as José Daniel "Yoshi"
- Juan Ugarte as Marcos
- Martín Barba as Byron
- Carmen Ramos as Pascualina
- Roberta Burns as Carolina
- Concepción Márquez as Mirta
- Nuria Blanco as Justina

=== Recurring and guest stars ===
- Hamlet Ramírez as Don Güero
- Miguel Gutiérrez as Roman
- Alfredo Jímenez as Adonay "Cara de bébe"
- Mauricio Guzmán as Rogelio "Jefe Apache"
- Paola Izquierdo as Lady Pañales
- Samadhi Domínguez as Alicia
- Daniel Resendíz as Daniel
- Talía Loaria as The thief
- Pascal Nadaud as Mascot instructor
- Omar Villegas as Carlos "Chato"
- Anna Elia García as Mother Severa
- Maribel Quero as Sister Dina
- Emma Escalante as The assistant
- Ana Celeste Montalvo as Emma Ramírez Sosa
- Paulina Gil as Wendy Power
- Lorenzo Pérez as Agustín
- Francisco de la Reguera as Darío del Risco
- Juan Carlos Remolina as José Encinas
- Cristina Montero as Lidia
- Pablo Perroni as Gilberto
- Diana Carreiro as Julieta
- Karla Farfán as Daniela
- Lucrecia Monje as Mother Granja
- Emiliano Camacho as Aguirre
- Lizzy Auna as Nadia
- Sergio Velasco as Paco del Oso
- Bárbara Turbay as Laura Rosas
- Audrey Moreno as Mercedes
- Pilar Flores del Valle as Nazareth
- Adriana Cadeña as Nezareth
- Francisco Calvillo as Pedro Villafuerte
- Carlos Barragán as Jesús
- Mercedes Vaughan as Consuelo
- Alfredo Gatica as Miguel Ramírez
- Aquiles Cervantes as José Carlos
- Marcelia Baetens as Real estate agent
- Christopher Arzarate as Rescuer
- Abraham Jurado as Felipe
- Viviana Serna as Kelly
- Claudia Santiago as History teacher

== Episodes ==
| No. | Title | Directed by | Written by | Original release date | Mexico viewers (millions) |
|---|---|---|---|---|---|
| 1 | "Tienda Piloto" | Pablo Silva Glez & Salvador Suárez Obregón & Erik Baeza & Raúl Caballero | Joserra Zúñiga & Tania Tinajero | 30 May 2022 | 0.77 |
The Supertitlán employees are informed that there will be a sale. Meanwhile, Diana is in charge of holding interviews for the ten new on trial employees and becomes attracted to Jonás.
| 2 | "¿Esto es un asalto?" | Pablo Silva Glez & Salvador Suárez Obregón & Erik Baeza & Raúl Caballero | Salvador Suárez Obregón & Héctor Barrios | 31 May 2022 | 0.50 |
Diana apprehends a woman she suspects has stolen cosmetics. Meanwhile, Gervasio tries to put a stop to a taco stand owner from using the store as an extension of his stand. Byron Mix, an urban singer, buys a ring at the store to propose to Michelle.
| 3 | "Dulce Ana" | Pablo Silva Glez & Salvador Suárez Obregón & Erik Baeza & Raúl Caballero | Paula Rendón & Karin Valecillos | 1 June 2022 | 0.64 |
Gervasio asks Amelia to be in charge of promoting a cake brand, but Amelia refuses as it doesn’t go with her ideals, and Carolina and Mateo offer to do it. Meanwhile, a competition is held to find the person to be Xolo, Supertitlán's mascot.
| 4 | "El Penacho" | Pablo Silva Glez & Salvador Suárez Obregón & Raúl Caballero | Diego Zanassi & Denisse Quintero | 2 June 2022 | 0.63 |
A magazine reporter comes to Supertitlán and Gervasio wants to show why they are different from other supermarkets. The reporter discovers Jonás' secret. Meanwhile, there is a jingle contest for Supertitlán and Michelle sees an opportunity for Byron Mix to participate.
| 5 | "La Guerra De Colores" | Pablo Silva Glez & Salvador Suárez Obregón | Diego Zanassi & Karin Valecillos | 6 June 2022 | 0.48 |
In order to increase sales, Gervasio divides all employees into two teams in a competition to see which team can have the highest number of sales at the end of the day.
| 6 | "Evaluador Sorpresa" | Pablo Silva Glez & Salvador Suárez Obregón & Erik Baeza | Paula Rendón & Tania Tinajero | 7 June 2022 | 0.55 |
Due to the poor results in the efficiency test, a surprise evaluator will arrive at Supertitlán to review everyone's work and will be incognito. Meanwhile, Byron moves on to the next round of the jingle contest and uses the store's facilities to record a video clip for the contest. Jonás is named co-floor supervisor and will be spending more time with Amelia.
| 7 | "El Maniquí" | Pablo Silva Glez & Salvador Suárez Obregón & Erik Baeza & Raúl Caballero | Salvador Suárez Obregón & Denisse Quintero | 8 June 2022 | 0.66 |
Amelia keeps pestering Jonás for being the delicate one of the team, so she takes her joke to the next level with the help of a mannequin. Meanwhile, chaos ensues after Mateo is appointed by Juan, who in turn was appointed by Amelia, to be in charge of all the employees' tasks for the day.
| 8 | "Turno Extra" | Salvador Suárez Obregón & Erik Baeza & Raúl Caballero | Joserra Zúñiga & Tania Tinajero | 9 June 2022 | 0.47 |
All the Supertitlán employees must stay overtime to put up signs with the new image of the store and are locked in, with no one being able to leave. The employees use the time to get to know each other better.
| 9 | "La venta especial de bodas" | Pablo Silva Glez & Salvador Suárez Obregón & Raúl Caballero | Paula Rendón & Tania Tinajero | 13 June 2022 | 0.60 |
Diana is determined to pursue Jonás and resigns from her position as assistant manager to become a saleswoman in order to be closer to him. Meanwhile, Amelia sees her daughter, Emma, trying to steal drinks to go out with her friends.
| 10 | "El buzón de quejas y sugerencias" | Pablo Silva Glez & Salvador Suárez Obregón & Erik Baeza & Raúl Caballero & Tan Sariñana | Salvador Suárez Obregón & Karin Valecillos | 14 June 2022 | 0.76 |
Diana tells Amelia that she is very close to her first date with Jonás, but Jonás gives her excuses to avoid her. Meanwhile, Gervasio offers Amelia and Jonás the assistant manager's job, but they turn it down, although Mateo wants the position.
| 11 | "Yo Soy Wendy Power" | Pablo Silva Glez & Salvador Suárez Obregón & Erik Baeza & Tan Sariñana | Diego Zanassi & Tania Tinajero | 15 June 2022 | 0.52 |
A YouTuber arrives at Supertitlán and makes Lola and Michelle take a new turn in their lives. Meanwhile, Fidencio, a customer who goes daily to take a nap in one of the chairs, dies in the store.
| 12 | "Xolo-Reciclatón" | Pablo Silva Glez & Salvador Suárez Obregón & Erik Baeza & Raúl Caballero | Joserra Zúñiga & Tania Tinajero | 16 June 2022 | 0.62 |
Gervasio starts a recycling program at Supertitlán and asks Don Güero to move his taco stand to install recycling bins. However, Don Güero is forced to move due to the Zero Tolerance to Informal Commerce program.
| 13 | "Labor de parto" | Pablo Silva Glez & Salvador Suárez Obregón & Erik Baeza & Raúl Caballero & Tan Sariñana | Joserra Zúñiga & Mauricio Somuano | 20 June 2022 | 0.50 |
Michelle gives birth to her baby in the sports department. In order to improve the store, Amelia sends Marcos to listen to the concerns and doubts of the customers. Everyone finds out that a second Supertitlán will be opening soon.
| 14 | "Súper Supertitlán" | Pablo Silva Glez & Erik Baeza & Raúl Caballero & Tan Sariñana | Denisse Quintero & Diego Zanassi | 21 June 2022 | 0.59 |
Jonás and Sandra are in charge of the puppy adoption booth at the store and they have to find homes for them, or else they will be euthanized. Meanwhile, all the employees are tired of hearing the good stories about the second Supertitlán store.
| 15 | "Infiltrados" | Pablo Silva Glez & Salvador Suárez Obregón & Erik Baeza & Raúl Caballero & Tan Sariñana | Paula Rendón & Tania Tinajero | 22 June 2022 | 0.50 |
Amelia, Gervasio and Jonás go undercover at the second Supertitlán store and realize that it is superior as it has better facilities and employees. Meanwhile, Byron will be covering for Michelle while she is at home tending to her newborn baby.
| 16 | "Armas y Cocinas" | Pablo Silva Glez & Erik Baeza & Tan Sariñana | Salvador Suárez Obregón & Karin Valecillos | 23 June 2022 | 0.54 |
It's Children's Day and Gervasio sets up a series of activities for his employees and for the customers to have fun. Meanwhile, Jonás has a conflict with one of the best-selling toys, the Super Destroyer Laser Gun, since he is against guns.
| 17 | "Verano En Mayo" | Pablo Silva Glez & Salvador Suárez Obregón & Erik Baeza & Raúl Caballero & Tan Sariñana | Paula Rendón & Tania Tinajero | 27 June 2022 | 0.67 |
Gervasio's new strategy is to bring summer forward to Supertitlán. Meanwhile, Amelia and Jonás' plans to go out together to the movies falter when he, in order to pretend that it's not a date, invites Juan.
| 18 | "La Liguilla" | Pablo Silva Glez & Erik Baeza & Tan Sariñana | Diego Zanassi & Mauricio Somuano | 28 June 2022 | 0.55 |
The Supertitlán 2 employees challenge Supertitlán 1 to a foosball match. Meanwhile, Mateo plans a date at his house for him and Darío, but amidst all the preparations and stress, he applies for a loan and discovers his true origins.
| 19 | "Construcción de Confianza" | Pablo Silva Glez & Salvador Suárez Obregón & Erik Baeza & Raúl Caballero & Tan Sariñana | Salvador Suárez Obregón & Denisse Quintero | 29 June 2022 | 0.64 |
Gervasio brings Paco, a Spanish coach, to Supertitlán so that the employees can work on trust and confidence between them. However, everyone gets food poisoning and Michelle, in the middle of her maternity leave, helps them out in the store.
| 20 | "Miss Supertitlán" | Pablo Silva Glez & Salvador Suárez Obregón & Erik Baeza & Raúl Caballero | Joserra Zúñiga & Karin Valecillos | 30 June 2022 | 0.69 |
Grupo Encinas holds a beauty contest between the two Supertitlán stores to find the image of Supertitlán. Amelia is chosen to compete against Nadia, Jonás' girlfriend.
| 21 | "Tienda Supercaliente" | Pablo Silva Glez & Salvador Suárez Obregón & Erik Baeza & Raúl Caballero & Tan Sariñana | Paula Rendón & Karin Valecillos | 4 July 2022 | 0.68 |
The air conditioning in the store breaks down and Amelia and Jonás decide to try to repair it. Meanwhile, the other employees take advantage of the weather to put on bathing suits and have a get-together.
| 22 | "Cosas Perdidas" | Pablo Silva Glez & Salvador Suárez Obregón & Erik Baeza & Raúl Caballero & Tan Sariñana | Joserra Zúñiga & Denisse Quintero | 5 July 2022 | 0.61 |
The Supertitlán employees organize a raffle to distribute the lost items of customers who have not claimed in more than 3 months. Mateo takes out a pair of shorts, but exchanges them with Amelia, who had won a leather jacket. Jonás and Amelia discover that inside the shorts are $10,000 pesos, so he recommends that she spend it on something she wants. Later everyone finds out and asks her to use the money for something that will benefit everyone.
| 23 | "La Caída de Supertitlán" | Pablo Silva Glez & Salvador Suárez Obregón & Raúl Caballero | Diego Zanassi & Denisse Quintero | 6 July 2022 | 0.71 |
Mr. Encinas must make a decision on which of the two Supertitlán stores will stay open, based on each store's sales. Although Diana believes their store can't improve in one day, Amelia encourages everyone to work as a team in order to win. Meanwhile, Daniela from Supertitlán 2, goes to Gervasio to ask him to hire her, because she believes that the original store is the one that will survive.
| 24 | "Quinceañera" | Pablo Silva Glez & Salvador Suárez Obregón & Erik Baeza & Raúl Caballero | Salvador Suárez Obregón & Tania Tinajero | 7 July 2022 | 0.58 |
When Amelia tells Jonás that she could not throw her daughter Ema a quinceañera party, he decides to organize a party for her. Meanwhile, Mateo keeps Diana's secret about her relationship with Darío for fear of being fired.
| 25 | "Amigos, Simplemente Amigos" | Pablo Silva Glez & Salvador Suárez Obregón & Erik Baeza & Raúl Caballero & Tan Sariñana | Diego Zanassi & Karin Valecillos | 11 July 2022 | 0.74 |
For World Friendship Day, Gervasio comes up with a sales strategy and pairs Amelia and Jonás in the Siamese T-shirt activity. Yoshi tries to get Ema's father Miguel to like him by pretending to be a floor manager. Mr. Encinas agrees to give Jonás the money to continue with his business. Mateo has had enough of Sandra's mythomania, so much so that he believes his boyfriend, Dario, is cheating on him with her.
| 26 | "Premio Felicitlán" | Pablo Silva Glez & Salvador Suárez Obregón & Erik Baeza & Raúl Caballero | Salvador Suárez Obregón & Denisse Quintero | 12 July 2022 | 0.64 |
Jonás decides to stay in Supertitlán. Mateo believes he is the deserving winner of the Felicitlán Award. Gervasio tries to win back customers who now make their purchases online. Jonás helps Michelle and Byron by being the guarantor so they can rent an apartment.
| 27 | "Día de Chicas" | Pablo Silva Glez & Salvador Suárez Obregón & Erik Baeza & Raúl Caballero | Paula Rendón & Tania Tinajero | 13 July 2022 | 0.57 |
The women are taking a course at Grupo Empresarial Encinas, while the men organize a basketball challenge. Also, Gervasio is busy researching more about the Super Nube service.
| 28 | "Noche de Tenochtitlán" | Erik Baeza & Raúl Caballero | Joserra Zúñiga & José Antonio Molina | 14 July 2022 | 0.48 |
Jonás and Gervasio have a sales strategy to beat Súper Nube and they come up with the idea of implementing the Night of Tenochtitlán. As part of the new strategy the store needs temporary employees, so Amelia's husband is hired. Meanwhile, Lola discovers Mateo and Dario secretly kissing, so she thinks they are betraying Sandra.
| 29 | "#VenASupertitlán" | Pablo Silva Glez & Salvador Suárez Obregón & Erik Baeza & Raúl Caballero & Tan Sariñana | Salvador Suárez Obregón & Karin Valecillos | 18 July 2022 | 0.66 |
The employees use all their talents to tackle Súper Nube's grand sales strategy and prevent their customers from leaving them.
| 30 | "El Último Día de Mateo" | Pablo Silva Glez & Salvador Suárez Obregón & Erik Baeza & Raúl Caballero | Paula Rendón & Tania Tinajero | 19 July 2022 | 0.54 |
Mateo prepares to say goodbye to Supertitlán's employees. Meanwhile, Amelia makes mistakes that push her further and further away from Jonás.
| 31 | "Nuevas Estrategias" | Salvador Suárez Obregón & Erik Baeza & Raúl Caballero | Joserra Zúñiga & José Antonio Molina & Karin Valecillos & Denisse Quintero & Tania Tinajero | 20 July 2022 | 0.61 |
Súper Nube continues to sweep the customers' attention, but Gervasio tries to come up with the best strategy to beat them.
| 32 | "La Boda De Michelle" | Salvador Suárez Obregón & Erik Baeza & Raúl Caballero | Diego Zanassi & Denisse Quintero | 21 July 2022 | 0.74 |
Michelle and Byron celebrate their wedding in Supertitlán.
| 33 | "Amelia Se Va" | Erik Baeza & Raúl Caballero | Joserra Zúñiga & José Antonio Molina | 25 July 2022 | 0.64 |
Amelia makes the decision to leave Supertitlán for a new opportunity.
| 34 | "Síndrome Del Locker Vacío" | Pablo Silva Glez & Salvador Suárez Obregón & Erik Baeza & Raúl Caballero | Diego Zanassi & Karin Valecillos | 26 July 2022 | 0.65 |
Amelia faces her first day at Super Nube. Meanwhile, Jonás asks Kelly to move in together; however, they cannot decide on the place they will share.
| 35 | "Amelia En El País De Alicia" | Salvador Suárez Obregón & Erik Baeza & Raúl Caballero | Paula Rendón & Tania Tinajero | 27 July 2022 | 0.67 |
Although Amelia is striving to make Super Nube a more humane place, memories from Supertitlán invade her. Meanwhile, Gervasio is looking for the employee thief who is trying to take his best associates.
| 36 | "¿Dónde Te Agarró El Temblor?" | Salvador Suárez Obregón & Erik Baeza & Raúl Caballero | Paula Rendón & Tania Tinajero | 28 July 2022 | 0.54 |
Diana insists on leading the earthquake drill and the first aid course, but at Dario's insistence, she will have to hire professionals. Meanwhile, Remedios has a premonition that warns her that there will be more than just a drill.
| 37 | "Productores Artesanales" | Salvador Suárez Obregón & Erik Baeza & Raúl Caballero | Salvador Suárez Obregón & Karin Valecillos | 1 August 2022 | 0.65 |
Gervasio's wives come to visit him to sell at the local farmer's market, but he is forced to ask for voluntary help from the Supertitlán associates.
| 38 | "El Divorcio de Amelia" | Salvador Suárez Obregón & Erik Baeza & Raúl Caballero | Paula Rendón & Denisse Quintero | 2 August 2022 | 0.50 |
Miguel promises Emma to take her to the United States and Jonás tries to help Amelia so her daughter won't leave her. Meanwhile, Gervasio takes Byron to Don Güero for a job.
| 39 | "Alicia vs. Súper Nube" | Salvador Suárez Obregón & Erik Baeza & Raúl Caballero | José Antonio Molina & Tania Tinajero | 3 August 2022 | 0.58 |
Gervasio is desperate because Súper Nube continues to impact Supertitlán's sales, and he uses the contacts Amelia made when she was working for the competition to his advantage. Meanwhile, Byron continues to work for Don Güero to get out of debt.
| 40 | "San Judas" | Salvador Suárez Obregón & Erik Baeza & Raúl Caballero | Joserra Zúñiga & Denisse Quintero | 4 August 2022 | 0.71 |
Amelia and Yoshi's mother clash over their differences when it comes to raising their children. Diana becomes obsessed with a thief in disguise at the store, but this could reveal the truth about Jonás.
| 41 | "Día de Muertos" | Salvador Suárez Obregón & Erik Baeza & Raúl Caballero | Diego Zanassi & Tania Tinajero | 8 August 2022 | 0.65 |
Lola is nervous because she will inform her mother that she is leaving home to become independent, while Kelly's jealousy is growing and it worsens when she and Amelia are forced to work together. Mateo asks for Michelle's help to get out of a trouble he's in for trying to look good with Gervasio.
| 42 | "Hadas y Monjas" | Salvador Suárez Obregón & Erik Baeza & Raúl Caballero | Joserra Zúñiga & José Antonio Molina & Karin Valecillos | 9 August 2022 | 0.64 |
Santi insists that Amelia go out with him, Jonás and Kelly on a double date. Meanwhile, Juan is keeping a close eye on Diana, as she is now dating other men, but they all look like him.
| 43 | "Sorpresa" | Salvador Suárez Obregón & Erik Baeza & Raúl Caballero | Paula Rendón & Denisse Quintero | 10 August 2022 | 0.49 |
Yoshi gets Byron the deal that will make him famous, as he will have a duet with Sor Presa. Meanwhile, Amelia feels bad for Kelly, after she ended her relationship with Jonás.
| 44 | "Súper Teen Tlán" | Salvador Suárez Obregón & Erik Baeza & Raúl Caballero | Salvador Suárez Obregón & Karin Valecillos | 11 August 2022 | 0.68 |
A nearby supermarket has closed, and Santi is proposing activations to attract customers. Meanwhile, Kelly continues to suffer from her breakup with Jonás, but that doesn't stop Jonás and Amelia from letting loose with the emotions they have now that they are both single. Amelia's daughter decides to join the Supertitlán team.
| 45 | "Ambiente De Trabajo Tóxico" | Salvador Suárez Obregón & Erik Baeza & Raúl Caballero | Joserra Zúñiga & José Antonio Molina & Tania Tinajero | 15 August 2022 | 0.65 |
Amelia and Jonás do their best to hide their relationship, although it is obvious to everyone what is going on between them. Meanwhile, Remedios and Pascualina plan to make a sexy calendar with the men in the store to sell and help Lola with her problems
| 46 | "El Engaño de Santiago" | Salvador Suárez Obregón & Erik Baeza & Raúl Caballero | Paula Rendón & Denisse Quintero | 16 August 2022 | 0.42 |
Lola and Remedios are convinced that Amelia is pregnant by Jonás after finding a pregnancy test in the bathroom. Meanwhile, Santiago has a plan in his hands but not only against Jonás, as he wants to go against his father's emporium.
| 47 | "El Secreto de Jonás" | Erik Baeza & Raúl Caballero | Diego Zanassi & Karin Valecillos | 17 August 2022 | 0.61 |
Jonás and Amelia are enjoying their love, but Santiago takes it upon himself to jeopardize the truth about Jonás' origin by revealing it all in a magazine.
| 48 | "El Espíritu Navideño" | Erik Baeza & Raúl Caballero | Salvador Suárez Obregón & Tania Tinajero | 18 August 2022 | 0.68 |
Jonás is seeking forgiveness from everyone, especially in the rejection he feels from Amelia, who does not plan on getting back together with him as she feels betrayed. Amelia has to direct the nativity play, where she decides to be the angel and casts Jonás as the devil.

== Production ==
On 22 February 2021, it was reported that a Spanish-language adaptation of the American sitcom Superstore was in development, titled Supertitlan. Filming took place from July to November 2021. On 1 November 2021, the main cast was announced. The series premiered on 30 May 2022. The series consists of 48 episodes.

== Ratings ==
Viewership and ratings per season of Supertitlán
| Season | Timeslot (CT) | Episodes | First aired | | Last aired | | Avg. viewers (millions) |
| Season | Timeslot (CT) | Episodes | Date | Viewers (millions) | Date | Viewers (millions) | Avg. viewers (millions) |
|---|---|---|---|---|---|---|---|
| 1 | Mon–Thurs 8:30 p.m. | 48 | 30 May 2022 | 0.77 | 18 August 2022 | 0.68 | 0.61 |
