= Calicut (disambiguation) =

Calicut, the former name for Kozhikode may refer to:

India

- Former state on Malabar Coast, India ruled by Zamorins (also see History of Kozhikode)
- Kozhikode, Kerala state, India
- Kozhikode district, Kerala

== See also ==
- Kozhikode (disambiguation)
- Calico (disambiguation), the word originates from Calicut
