= Kozhikode (disambiguation) =

Kozhikode or Calicut is a city in Kerala, India. It may also refer to:

- Kozhikode district, a district in Kerala
- Kozhikode metropolitan area, the city and its surrounding metro area
- Kozhikode (Lok Sabha constituency), a constituency in Kerala
- Kingdom of Kozhikode, a polity that ruled the city

== See also ==
- Calicut (disambiguation)
