= Calico, West Virginia =

Unincorporated community in West Virginia, United States

Calico
- Unincorporated community
- Location within the state of West Virginia Calico (the United States)
- Coordinates: 37°38′25″N 82°00′13″W
- Country: United States
- State: West Virginia
- County: Mingo
- Elevation: 1,529 ft (466 m)
- Time zone: UTC-5 (Eastern (EST))
  - Summer (DST): UTC-4 (EDT)
- GNIS ID: 1728744

Calico is an unincorporated community in Mingo County, West Virginia, United States. Its post office is closed.
