= Calico (footballer) =

Portuguese footballer

Personal information
- Full name: Carlos Manuel Almeida Almeida
- Date of birth: 6 December 1987 (age 38)
- Place of birth: Mangualde, Portugal
- Height: 1.82 m (6 ft 0 in)
- Positions: Centre-back; right-back

Team information
- Current team: CD Gouveia

Youth career
- 1996–2004: Mangualde
- 2004–2006: Académico Viseu

Senior career*
Years	Team	Apps	(Gls)
2006–2013	Académico Viseu	189	(10)
2013–2014	União Madeira	16	(0)
2014	Beira-Mar	0	(0)
2014–2023	Lusitano FCV	219	(10)
2023	AD Sátão	20	(0)
2023–	CD Gouveia	0	(0)
- * Club domestic league appearances and goals as of 21:20, 7 January 2024 (UTC)

Carlos Manuel Almeida Almeida (born 6 December 1987), nicknamed Calico is a Portuguese professional footballer who plays as a centre-back or right-back for Campeonato de Portugal club CD Gouveia. He played in the Portuguese second tier for União Madeira.
