= Calico Valley =

Valley in Georgia, United States

Coordinates: 34°22′36.3″N 84°44′19.8″W

Calico Valley is a valley in Bartow County, in the U.S. state of Georgia. The valley contains Calico Creek which emerges from a spring in the valley and runs through the base until it joins the larger Pinelog Creek.

Calico Valley was named from the fact the local women were so fond of wearing calico, according to local history.
