= Betsy Thomas =

American screenwriter

Betsy Thomas (born 1966) is an American television writer and producer living in Los Angeles, California with her husband, writer and actor Adrian Wenner.

Thomas is best known as the creator of the sitcom My Boys that debuted on the cable television network TBS November 28, 2006. She is a writer and executive producer on the show. She also created and executive-produced the short-lived sitcom Run of the House, which aired from September 2003 to May 2004 on The WB. Thomas was also one of the producers of NBC's sitcom, Whitney.

In 2019, Thomas joined other WGA members in firing her agents as part of the Guild's stand against the ATA after the two sides were unable to come to an agreement on a new "Code of Conduct" that addressed the practice of packaging.

Thomas was raised in Franklin, Michigan, with seven brothers and sisters. She attended Detroit Country Day School.

== Filmography ==
=== Film ===
Year	Title	Role	Notes
1998	Pam Flam & the Center of the Universe	Writer/Director	Short

=== Television ===
Year	Title	Role	Notes
1994	My So-Called Life	Writer/Story Editor	9 episodes
2000	Then Came You	Executive Producer	13 episodes
2001	Second to None	Executive Producer	TV movie
2003-04	Run of the House	Executive Producer	19 episodes
2006-10	My Boys	Creator/Director/Executive Producer	40 episodes
2011	Glory Daze	Director	Episode: "Hit Me with Your Test Shot"
2011-12	Whitney	Creator/Director/Executive Producer	61 episodes
2012-13	Guys with Kids	Director/Executive Producer/Writer	16 episodes
2013-20	Mom	Director	2 episodes
2014-15	Men at Work	Director	2 episodes
2014-15	Bad Judge	Executive Producer	Episode: "Face Mask Mom"
2015	Not Sale for Work	Director	TV movie
2015-16	The Carmichael Show	Director	3 episodes
2016	Crunch Time	Executive Producer	TV movie
2016-20	Superstore	Director	2 episodes
2016	Dr. Ken	Director	Episode: "Ken Learns Korean"
2017-18	Superior Donuts	Director/Executive Producer	18 episodes
2018	Alone Together	Director	Episode: "Fertility"
2019	The Neighborhood	Director	Episode: "Welcome to the Yard Sale"
2019	Superstore	Director	2 episodes
2019	The Cool Kids	Director	Episode: "The Friend-aversary"
2019	Abby's	Writer	Episode: "Soda Gun"
2019	Merry Happy Whatever	Director	Episode: "Merry ExMas"
2019	Mad About You	Director	3 episodes
2020-21	The Unicorn	Director	2 episodes
2020	Outmatched	Director	4 episodes
2020	Mr. Iglesias	Director	Episode: "Party of One"
2021	Turner & Hooch	Director	Episode: "The Fur-gitive"
2022	Home Economics	Director	3 episodes
