= Iowa Central Air Line Railroad =

The Iowa Central Air Line Rail Road, also derisively known as the Calico Railroad, is a historic railroad that was planned to operate in Iowa.

The railroad was planned to operate from Lyons, Iowa to Council Bluffs, Iowa and was organized in 1853.

Iowa residents purchased stock and Iowa counties voted bonds to help build the road. Early in 1854 work on the track between Lyons and Iowa City was begun and progressed rapidly.

The funds, however, were inadequate and some were misappropriated. As a result, work was stopped in June and engineers, contractors and laborers, involving some 2,000 persons in all, were left without their pay and without work. The Iowa counties, however, were compelled to redeem their bonds.

The railroad company had a store at Lyons, and the goods (including a supply of calico) were distributed in partial payment to the workers; hence the nickname.
