= Michael Bunin =

American actor

- Born: January 14, 1970 (age 56); Norfolk, Virginia, United States
- Occupation: Actor
- Years active: 1998–present
- Known for: The Soloist; My Boys; The Last Tycoon; Superstore

Michael Louis Bunin (born January 14, 1970) is an American actor, known for playing the role of "Kenny" on the TBS sitcom My Boys. He is a prolific commercial actor having starred in at least 50 national commercials. He has also guest starred on several hit TV shows including Scrubs, C.S.I., Without a Trace, Charmed, Rules of Engagement, and Las Vegas. He is mostly known for his recurring role as Jeff on Superstore.

Though born in Norfolk, VA, most of his youth and young adult life was spent in the Las Vegas Valley, where he attended the University of Nevada, Las Vegas and studied theater arts. His improvisational skills were honed with studies at The Second City Players Workshop in Chicago and the famed Groundlings in Los Angeles.
