= Superstore (TV series) =

American television sitcom (2015–2021)

- Genre: Sitcom; Workplace comedy; Dark comedy; Cringe comedy; Satire
- Created by: Justin Spitzer
- Starring: America Ferrera; Ben Feldman; Lauren Ash; Colton Dunn; Nico Santos; Nichole Sakura; Mark McKinney; Kaliko Kauahi
- Theme music composer: Jesse Novak
- Composer: Mateo Messina
- Country of origin: United States
- Original language: English
- No. of seasons: 6
- No. of episodes: 113 (list of episodes)

Production
- Executive producers: Justin Spitzer; Ruben Fleischer; David Bernad; Gabe Miller; Jonathan Green; Jackie Clarke; America Ferrera (seasons 5–6)
- Producers: Harry J. Lange Jr.; Eric Ledgin; Sierra Teller Ornelas; America Ferrera (seasons 1–4); Ben Feldman (seasons 5–6)
- Production locations: Kmart in Burbank, California (pilot); Universal Studios Hollywood (seasons 1–6)
- Cinematography: Damián Acevedo; Jay Hunter
- Editors: Mark Sadlek; Steven Lang; James Renfroe; Richie Edelson
- Camera setup: Single-camera
- Running time: 22 minutes
- Production companies: Spitzer Holding Company; The District; Universal Television; Miller Green Broadcasting (2019–21)

Original release
- Network: NBC
- Release: November 30, 2015 – March 25, 2021

Related
- Supertitlán

Superstore is an American television sitcom that aired on NBC from November 30, 2015, to March 25, 2021. The series was created and produced by Justin Spitzer. It stars America Ferrera and Ben Feldman, both of whom also served as executive producers. The show follows a group of employees working at Cloud 9, a fictional big-box retail chain located in St. Louis, Missouri. The ensemble cast includes Lauren Ash, Colton Dunn, Nico Santos, Nichole Sakura, Mark McKinney, and Kaliko Kauahi.

A Spanish-language adaptation titled Supertitlán premiered on the Mexican television network Azteca 7 on May 30, 2022. In the United Kingdom, Superstore aired on ITV2 from its premiere until 2025. Starting in January 2026, it will be broadcast on U&Dave in the UK and Ireland on Saturday nights. The series has also been broadcast on Sky One since Autumn 2026.

== Cast and characters ==
=== Main ===
- America Ferrera portrays Amelia "Amy" Dubanowski (née Sosa), (Note: Credited as a series regular up until episode 2 of the sixth season. Ferrera returned in the last three episodes in a "special guest starring" role.) a Cloud 9 employee who starts as an associate and floor supervisor before being promoted to store manager. Amy prefers to wear a different name tag each day because she dislikes strangers using her real name. She has a teenage daughter with her high school sweetheart, Adam, and although they divorce, Amy eventually has another child with him. In the second episode of season 6, Amy leaves the store for a corporate position at Cloud 9, but she returns for the final three episodes.
- Ben Feldman portrays Jonah Simms, a Cloud 9 sales associate and a college student who dropped out of business school. Initially, Jonah struggles with his job in customer service, which he conceals from his upper-middle-class family. He and Mateo are both hired by Dina in the pilot episode of the series. Although he dates other women throughout the show, his attraction to Amy is evident. At the end of season 2, he loses his home to a tornado and subsequently moves in with Garrett.
- Lauren Ash portrays Dina Fox, the intense and no-nonsense assistant store manager at Cloud 9. Having worked for the company for over ten years, she possesses a strong and forthright demeanor. Dina is a strict vegan, though she temporarily compromises her diet in Season 3, Episode 9, titled "Golden Globes Party," to demonstrate her dedication to friendship. She shares her apartment with a large collection of birds, whom she affectionately refers to as her "babies."
- Nico Santos plays Mateo Fernando Aquino Liwanag, a Cloud 9 associate. After discovering that he has unknowingly been living as an undocumented immigrant, Mateo tries to keep his immigration status a secret. However, he is ultimately arrested by ICE at the end of season four. Eventually, he becomes an assistant to the manager, the only position he can take without corporate approval. Mateo is gay and has had romantic relationships with district manager Jeff (played by Michael Bunin) and later with Amy's brother Eric (played by George Salazar). In season six, he and Eric become engaged, and in a flash-forward at the end of the final episode, they are seen proudly displaying their wedding rings.
- Colton Dunn as Garrett McNeil: A sarcastic and indifferent Cloud 9 associate who is a wheelchair user. He is also the in-store announcer, in which capacity he often offers his acerbic commentary and dry humor. He and Dina are dating by the end of season 6, following an on-again, off-again relationship throughout the series.
- Nichole Sakura as Cheyenne Taylor Lee: A Cloud 9 associate later promoted to floor supervisor in the sixth season. She is a pregnant high school student at the start of the series. She gives birth to her daughter, Harmonica, in the store in the first-season finale, and married her boyfriend, Bilbo "Bo" Derek Thompson (Johnny Pemberton) during the second season. Sakura was originally credited with her stage name of Nichole Bloom before returning to using her birth name in the final season.
- Mark McKinney as Glenn Sturgis: Cloud 9's incessantly positive store manager until late in season 4, when he steps down and becomes an associate–and later floor supervisor–to spend more time with his family. After Amy leaves in season 6, he becomes manager again. Glenn is a devout Christian and is a foster father to many children. He has a biological daughter of his own in season 4, with Dina as the surrogate for him and his wife, Jerusha (Kerri Kenney-Silver).
- Kaliko Kauahi as Sandra Kaluiokalani (season 5–6; recurring season 1–4): A meek Cloud 9 employee who has trouble standing up for herself. Throughout the series, she slowly starts to speak up when being wronged. In season 5, she marries Jerry (Chris Grace), and the pair later adopt Glenn's 17-year-old former foster son, Tony (Benjamin Norris).

== Setting ==
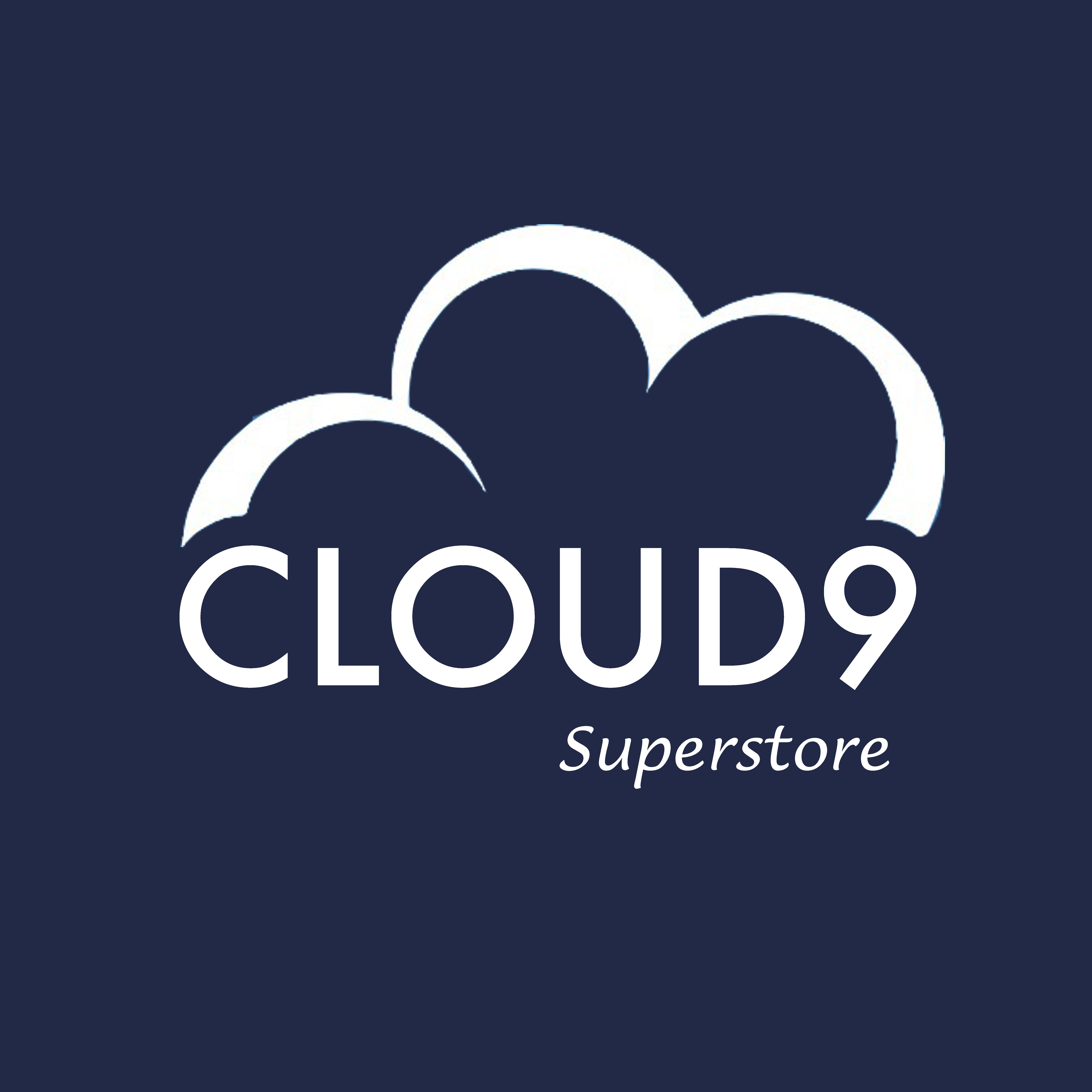
Cloud 9 Superstore logo

The Cloud 9 Superstore is a fictional big box store. In addition to typical American everyday products, Cloud 9 sells guns, liquor, and has a pharmacy. Cloud 9 has its own credit union for its employees in addition to a photo studio. The mascot for Cloud 9 is Daniel Hertzler (as Kyle the Cloud 9 Cloud), until he is arrested and charged with cannibalism.

The corporation, which is based in Chicago, Illinois, does not offer paid maternity leave, health insurance, or paid overtime to its employees. Under Cloud 9 policy, employees may take one bathroom break per shift and are allotted 15 minutes for lunch. Also, in the season one episode "Strike", Cloud 9 sends a union buster.

In an effort to control what is happening in the individual stores, all locks and lights, as well as temperature and music, are controlled from the corporate office. In 2017, Cloud 9 changes its store brand from Halo to Super Cloud. The store also has its own magazine called Stratus.

The show's main characters work at Store 1217, the "Ozark Highlands" store, which is located in St. Louis, Missouri, on Ozark Highlands Road. The store falls under Jeff Sutton, who is district manager from 2006 to 2018, and then again from late 2020 (following Laurie Neustadt in 2018 and Maya from 2019 to 2020). The store is destroyed by a tornado during the season 2 finale and reopens during the season 3 premiere. Other area Cloud 9 locations include Kirkwood, Fenton, Easton, and Bel-Ridge. Additionally, there are locations mentioned in Austin, Texas, and Detroit, Michigan. Cloud 9 has locations in multiple countries, with stores in Beijing, Mumbai, Paris, Vancouver, Taipei, and Mexico City.

== Episodes ==
Season	Episodes	Originally released	
Season	Episodes	First released	Last released
1	11	November 30, 2015	February 22, 2016
2	22	August 19, 2016	May 4, 2017
3	22	September 28, 2017	May 3, 2018
4	22	October 4, 2018	May 16, 2019
5	21	September 26, 2019	April 23, 2020
6	15	October 29, 2020	March 25, 2021

== Production ==
=== Development and filming ===
The series was one of three pilots picked up by NBC on January 14, 2015. The series was the first project for Ruben Fleischer's newly-formed company, The District, as part of a two-year deal with Universal, as he directed the pilot episode. Superstore was officially picked up as a series by NBC on May 7, 2015. The first season consisted of eleven episodes after the episode order was reduced from thirteen on October 19, 2015. NBC announced on November 2, 2015, that the series would premiere on Monday, January 4, 2016, but before the premiere it would air two back-to-back episodes on November 30, 2015, following The Voice.

On February 23, 2016, the series was renewed for a second season by NBC. On May 15, 2016, NBC announced that the series would lead off its Thursday night primetime programming in the 2016–17 season. The second season premiered on September 22, 2016, with a 22-episode order that was announced on September 23, 2016. The season concluded on May 4, 2017.

A special Olympics-themed episode aired on August 19, 2016, during the network's coverage of the 2016 Rio Summer Olympics. On February 21, 2018, NBC renewed the series for a 22-episode fourth season, which premiered on October 4, 2018. On March 4, 2019, NBC renewed the series for a fifth season, which premiered on September 26, 2019. On February 11, 2020, the series was renewed for a sixth season.

In March 2020, production on the show was shut down due to the COVID-19 pandemic, which resulted in the fifth season having 21 episodes instead of the originally-planned 22. The sixth season began filming on September 8, 2020. The season premiered on October 29, 2020. In December 2020, NBC announced that the sixth season would be its last. Production on the final season was completed on February 28, 2021. The series finale aired on March 25, 2021.

The pilot was shot at a redressed Kmart in Burbank, California (with Kmart signage visible throughout the episode), but the rest of the series was shot on sets constructed on two soundstages.

=== Casting ===
It was announced on February 20, 2015, that Lauren Ash had been cast as a series regular, and would be playing Dina, the store's assistant manager. On March 2, 2015, Deadline reported that Superstore had added three other cast members: Colton Dunn, Mark McKinney and Nico Santos. The website reported that Dunn would be playing Garrett, the often-sarcastic peanut gallery and coworker, McKinney was cast to be Glenn, the religiously well meaning store manager, and Santos would be playing Mateo, another new employee and a brown-noser from an impoverished background. On March 12, 2015, Nichole Sakura was announced to have joined the show as Cheyenne, a pregnant teenage employee.

Deadline announced on March 13, 2015, that Ben Feldman had landed the male lead on Superstore, as Jonah, a new employee at the superstore Cloud 9. Three days later, TVLine announced on March 16, 2015, that America Ferrera had been given the female lead as the floor supervisor Amy in the Cloud 9 store. It was also reported that Ferrera was also a producer for the show.

On May 22, 2019, NBC announced that recurring cast member Kaliko Kauahi who portrays Cloud 9 worker Sandra had been upped to a series regular for the fifth season.

==== America Ferrera's departure ====
After NBC had initially announced the sixth season renewal of the series, the network revealed on February 28, 2020, that series star America Ferrera, would be departing the series at the end of the fifth season citing a desire to work on new projects and to spend more time with her family.

After production of the fifth season was cut short by one episode due to the COVID-19 pandemic, Ferrera noted her departure from the show might be delayed into season 6 in order to give her character's arc a proper closure. Ultimately, Ferrera was in the first two episodes of the sixth season as well as the final three episodes.

=== Crossovers ===
Different Cloud 9 store locations have appeared in other series produced by NBCUniversal Television, including Hulu's The Mindy Project, NBC's Good Girls, I Feel Bad and Kenan.

== Reception ==
=== Ratings ===
The series debuted as a "preview" on November 30, 2015, following an episode of The Voice with seven million viewers, making it the second highest new comedy behind Life in Pieces. The series then moved to its regular Monday at 8:00 pm timeslot on January 4, 2016, with more than six million viewers making the highest rated NBC comedy that did not have The Voice as a lead-in since The Michael J. Fox Show back in September 2013.

Season	Time slot (ET/PT)	Episodes	Season premiere		Season finale		TV season	Rank	Viewers (in millions)
Season	Time slot (ET/PT)	Episodes	Date	Viewers (in millions)	Date	Viewers (in millions)	TV season	Rank	Viewers (in millions)
1	Monday 8:00 pm (Note: The premiere episode aired outside of its regular time at Monday 10:00 pm. The third episode aired at Monday 9:00 pm.)	11	November 30, 2015	7.21	February 22, 2016	4.68	2015–16	#66	6.58
2	Thursday 8:00 pm	22	September 22, 2016	5.45	May 4, 2017	2.91	2016–17	#91	4.81
3	Thursday 8:00 pm	22	September 28, 2017	4.60	May 3, 2018	2.97	2017–18	#102	4.87
4	Thursday 8:00 pm	22	October 4, 2018	3.16	May 16, 2019	1.95	2018–19	#113	4.19
5	Thursday 8:00 pm	21	September 26, 2019	2.86	April 23, 2020	3.01	2019–20	#87	3.82
6	Thursday 8:00 pm (1–4, 11, 13–14); Thursday 8:30 pm (5–10, 12, 15)	15	October 29, 2020	2.80	March 25, 2021	2.41	2020–21	#100	3.05

=== Critical reception ===
Critical response of Superstore
Season	Rotten Tomatoes
1	66%
2	100%
3	100%
4	100%
5	100%
6	94%

On Metacritic, the first season has a score of 58 out of 100, indicating "mixed or average reviews" based on reviews from 21 critics. On Rotten Tomatoes, the first season has a 66% rating, based on reviews from 35 critics, with an average rating of 5.00/10. The site's consensus is: "Superstore's talented cast and obvious potential are slightly overshadowed by a tonally jumbled presentation and thin, formulaic writing."

As the first season went along, reviews started to become more positive. Following the finale "Labor", the Los Angeles Times called it one of TV's best new comedies." Pilot Viruet of The A.V. Club wrote that the "first season ... got better and more confident as it moved on", and that the first-season finale "is a nice little cap to a nice little sitcom that could’ve used a little more attention." After the series aired its Olympics special, Variety wrote that the show was "a funny, pointed and essential workplace comedy", and that "there are no weak links in [the] ensemble".

The second season was lauded by critics and has a 100% approval rating on Rotten Tomatoes, based on reviews from seven critics. The third season has 100% approval rating on Rotten Tomatoes based on reviews from 11 critics. The site's consensus reads, "Superstore graduates from the clearance section of network comedies to stake its claim as one of the most lovable ensembles on television, fleshing out its charming cast while expertly teasing out its central romance." The fourth season received critical acclaim with critics saying "Superstore remains a furtively fearless riot in its comedic approach to heavy, timely issues." with a score of 100% on Rotten Tomatoes based on 15 reviews. The fifth season received critical acclaim with a score of 100% on Rotten Tomatoes based on nine reviews. The sixth season has received positive reviews with a score of 92% on Rotten Tomatoes based on 13 reviews.

=== Accolades ===
Year	Award	Category	Nominee(s)	Result	Ref.
2016	Imagen Awards	Best Actress – Television	America Ferrera	Nominated	
2017	Casting Society of America	Outstanding Achievement in Casting – Television Pilot and First Season – Comedy	Susie Farris, Collin Daniel, Brett Greenstein, Sherie Hernandez, Melanie Crescenz	Nominated	
2017	Gracie Awards	Actress in a Leading Role – Comedy or Musical	America Ferrera	Won	
2017	Golden Nymph Awards	TV series Comedy	Superstore	Nominated	
2017	Golden Nymph Awards	Best Actress – Comedy	America Ferrera	Nominated	
2017	Imagen Awards	Best Primetime Television Program – Comedy	Superstore	Nominated	
2018	Golden Reel Award	Outstanding Achievement in Sound Editing – Sound Effects, Foley, Music, Dialogue and ADR for Live Action Broadcast Media Under 30 Minutes	Christopher B. Reeves, Gabrielle Gilbert Reeves, David Mann, Jason Tregoe Newman, Bryant J. Fuhrmann, Joseph T. Sabella, Jesi Ruppel and Gary Marullo	Won	
2018	GLAAD Media Award	Outstanding Comedy Series	Superstore	Nominated	
2018	Teen Choice Awards	Choice Comedy TV Actress	America Ferrera	Nominated	
2018	Critics' Choice Television Award	Best Supporting Actor in a Comedy Series	Nico Santos	Nominated	
2019	Critics' Choice Television Award	Best Supporting Actor in a Comedy Series	Nico Santos	Nominated	
2020	GLAAD Media Awards	Outstanding Comedy Series	Superstore	Nominated	
2021	GLAAD Media Awards	Outstanding Comedy Series	Superstore	Nominated	
2021	TCA Awards	Outstanding Achievement in Comedy	Superstore	Nominated	
2021	Hollywood Critics Association TV Awards	Best Broadcast Network Series, Comedy	Superstore	Nominated	
2021	Hollywood Critics Association TV Awards	Best Supporting Actor in a Broadcast Network or Cable Series, Comedy	Nico Santos	Won	
2021	Hollywood Critics Association TV Awards	Best Supporting Actress in a Broadcast Network or Cable Series, Comedy	Lauren Ash	Nominated	
2022	Writers Guild of America Award	Episodic Comedy	Justin Spitzer (story), Jonathan Green and Gabe Miller (teleplay) for "All Sales Final"	Nominated	

== Cancelled spin-off ==
In December 2020, it was reported that a spin-off, titled Bo & Cheyenne and starring Johnny Pemberton and Nichole Sakura, was in early development at NBC. The series was to be a co-production between Spitzer Holding Company, The District, and Universal Television, with Bridget Kyle and Vicky Luu as writers. On March 25, 2021, following Superstore's series finale, the showrunners stated that they did not factor the potential spin-off into the episode because its development was still in early stages. The following day Kyle said in an interview that the project appeared dead, stating, "Unfortunately, yesterday, NBC notified us that they're not going forward with the Superstore spin-off."

== Spanish-language adaptation ==
In February 2021, it was reported that a Spanish-language adaptation, titled Supertitlán, was in development. Filming took place from July to November 2021. On November 1, 2021, the main cast was announced. The series premiered on May 30, 2022. The first season consists of 48 episodes.

== Home media ==
Season	Release date		
Season	Region 1 DVD	Region 2 DVD	Region 4 DVD
1	August 23, 2016	January 25, 2019	September 5, 2018
2	July 4, 2017	March 29, 2019	September 5, 2018
3	September 4, 2018	N/A	July 3, 2019
4	N/A	N/A	March 4, 2020
5	N/A	N/A	March 3, 2021
6	N/A	N/A	N/A
Complete Series	July 25, 2023	N/A	N/A

The complete series is set to be released on Blu-ray on November 3, 2026.
