= Kris Lefcoe =

Kris Lefcoe is a film director and writer based in New York City. She graduated from the University of Toronto with a degree in philosophy, before attending Norman Jewison's Canadian Film Centre as a Director Resident. Many of Lefcoe's films are dark comedies about contemporary culture.

Kris wrote, directed and produced the comedy pilot Giving Up, which won a number of awards including Overall Best of the Fest, and Best Writing, at the 2017 New York Television Festival, and Best Comedy and Best Director at Seriesfest. The series is executive produced by David Wain (Wet Hot American Summer).

Lefcoe's feature film Public Domain, starring Don McKellar, Nicole DeBoer (Private Eyes, The Dead Zone) and Jason Jones (The Daily Show, The Detour), premiered at the South by Southwest film festival and won the Audience Award for Best Feature at the Beverly Hills Film Festival. The film was installed in a curated program of video art at Art Basel Miami.

Lefcoe wrote and directed a number of notable short films, including Tiny Riot Project, which screened at the Rotterdam Film Festival, was installed at Havana Biennale and Art Basel Miami, and sold to The Sundance Channel, and Can I Get a Witness?, starring Scott Speedman, which premiered at Toronto International Film Festival.

Kris Lefcoe has directed numerous music videos, including Peaches Boys Wanna Be Her. Her work has been nominated Best New Artist MVA and winner of Best Music Video at the Ottawa International Animation Festival.
