= Victor Nelli Jr. =

American television director and producer

- Born: Los Angeles, California, U.S.
- Occupations: Television director and producer
- Years active: 1984–present
- Spouse: Caterina Fiordellisi Nelli

Victor Nelli Jr. is an American television director and producer.

He began his professional career at Viacom, Inc. working as a cinematographer on the MTV and Comedy Central series The Real World, House of Style, Mr. Show with Bob and David, and a number of other series. He eventually made his directorial debut directing an episode of The Bernie Mac Show. His other directorial credits include The Office, the American version of Wilfred, Community, Gilmore Girls, Ugly Betty, My Name Is Earl, Scrubs, Everybody Hates Chris, My Boys, Once Upon a Time, Atypical, Brooklyn Nine-Nine, and Superstore

Nelli was also an executive producer and occasional director for the NBC series Outsourced.
