= Colton Dunn =

American comedian, actor and writer (b. 1977)

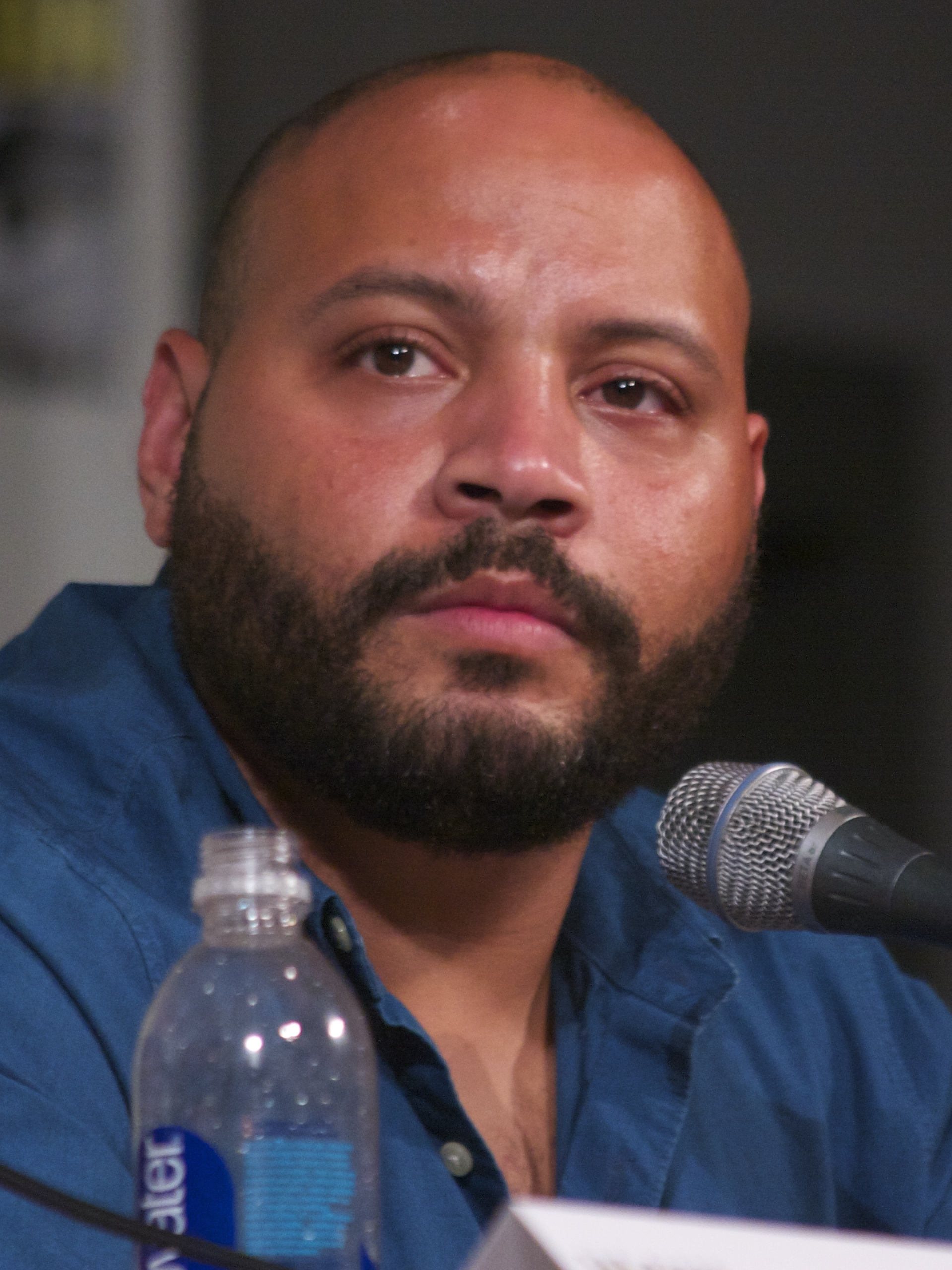
- Dunn at the 2015 Comic-Con International
- Born: Colton McHenry; June 30, 1977 (age 49); Normal, Illinois, U.S.
- Spouse: Jessica Stier
- Children: 2

Comedy career
- Years active: 2001–present
- Medium: Stand-up; film; television

Colton Dunn (born Colton McHenry; June 30, 1977) is an American comedian, actor, writer and producer. He is best known for his roles as Garrett McNeil on the NBC workplace comedy Superstore (2015–2021), Lester Kitchens in the Netflix spy-adventure series The Recruit (2022–2025), and Herman in Lazer Team (2015) and its sequel Lazer Team 2 (2017). As a writer and producer, Dunn has worked on Comedy Central’s Key & Peele (2012–2015) as well as Apple TV’s Widows Bay (2026), for which he received the Primetime Emmy Award for Outstanding Comedy Series.

== Life and career ==
Born in 1977 in Normal, Illinois, Dunn, who is of African American heritage, moved to Saint Paul, Minnesota with his mother when he was a toddler. While attending Saint Paul Central High School, he was involved in theater and joined an improv comedy group. Dunn moved to New York in 1998, and while there, worked for Late Night with Conan O'Brien. He then moved to Los Angeles in 2004.

Prior to working on Key & Peele, Dunn was a writer and performer on madTV, from 2005 to 2009. He has also appeared in Parks and Recreation, Nick Swardson's Pretend Time, Game Shop, Burning Love, a small part on CollegeHumor's If Google Was a Guy, and co-starred as Garrett McNeil in Superstore on NBC. Dunn hosted the comedy variety show RT-ES, produced by Rooster Teeth Productions, and co-starred in their sci-fi action comedy Lazer Team in 2015.

He is an alumnus of the improvisational comedy group Boom Chicago and has performed and taught at the Upright Citizens Brigade Theatre since 1999.

Dunn has received two Emmy Award nominations for Outstanding Writing for a Variety Series for his work on Key & Peele.

In 2019, Dunn appeared on the podcast Hello from the Magic Tavern as a talking crossbow in the episode "Wizard with a Crossbow". He reprised this role in March 2022 in the season 4 episode "Talking Crossbow Visits".

== Filmography ==
=== Film ===
Year	Title	Role	Notes
2003	Phileine Says Sorry	Newsreader 5	
2004	Beep	Greg	Short film
2007	Twisted Fortune	Oliver	
2008	Boner Boyz	Boner Boyz	Short film; also writer and producer
2009	Dow Jones	Homeless Guy	Video short
2010	The Big Dog	Salesman	Short film
2010	LeBron Waynes Makes His Decision: Chicken Wings	LeBron Waynes	Short film; also writer
2010	Hatchet II	Vernon	
2010	Take a Silly One	Sergeant	Video short
2011	Damn Love	Gardener	Short film
2011	Rockin' Out	Colton	Video short; also writer
2011	Forcin' the Blues	Colton	Video short
2013	Unidentified	Dave	
2014	Spirit Town	Buddy Hickel	Short film
2015	The Dramatics: A Comedy	Dennis	
2015	Lazer Team	Herman	
2015	Monster Problems	Julian	Short film
2016	Other People	Dan	
2017	Killing Hasselhoff	Redix	
2017	Lazer Team 2	Herman	
2018	Blockers	Rudy	
2018	Dude	Officer Higgins	
2022	Jackass Forever	—N/a	Writer
2026	Ali G: Who Iz I?		Story co-writer
TBA	Judgment Day	TBA	Post-production

=== Television ===
Year	Title	Role	Notes
2001	Mad TV Live and Almost Legal	Yaris Guy	TV movie
2004	Last Laugh '04	Patron	TV movie
2004–05	Boiling Points		Series regular
2005–09	MadTV	Various	2 episodes; also writer of 55 episodes
2009	Marvel Superheroes: What the--?!	War Machine	Voice
2009	Brothers	Roscoe	Episode: "Pilot"
2009	Brainstorm	Darryl	8 episodes
2010–11	Pretend Time	Various	5 episodes; also writer of 7 episodes
2010–11	The League	Cop	2 episodes
2010–15	Parks and Recreation	Brett Hull	6 episodes
2011	Team Unicorn	Blake	Episode: "SuperHarmony"; also wrote 2 episodes
2011	Honey and Joy	Earl the Clown	
2011	Childrens Hospital	70's Dude	Episode: "The '70s Episode"
2011	Roommate Meeting	Cop	Episode: "Rat Problem Solved"
2012	Game Shop	Derrick	11 episodes; also writer
2012	Sketchy	Agent #1	Episode: "Bourne Again"
2012	NTSF:SD:SUV::	Al	Episode: "Time Angels"
2012	The Funtime Gang	Gary the Giraffe	TV movie
2012–13	Campus Security	Darren Scott	6 episodes
2012–13	Burning Love	Tim	7 episodes
2012–15	Key & Peele	Various	4 episodes; also writer and co-producer of 53 episodes
2012–15	Comedy Bang! Bang!	Various	3 episodes
2013	Happy Endings	Thug	Episode: "The Marry Prankster"
2013	The Arsenio Hall Show	—N/a	Writer of 30 episodes
2014	Kroll Show	Tony	Episode: "Sponsored by Stamps"
2014	NerdTerns	Barry	Episode: "Matt Bennett in Jenny vs. Hallie"
2014	Drunk History	Narrator	Episode: "American Music"
2014	Mr. Pickles	Rich Snob, Darrel	Voice; episode: "The Cheeseman"
2014	This Is Why You're Single	Not Brandon	TV movie
2015	Trevor Moore: High in Church	Doug	TV special
2015	Red Baroness Warrior Single Lady	No Tongue	Episode: "The Good Listener"
2015	RT–ES	Himself (host) / Various	8 episodes; also writer and executive producer
2015–17	Steven Universe	Mr. Smiley	Voice; 4 episodes
2015–21	Superstore	Garrett McNeil	Main cast, 113 episodes; also writer of "Forced Hire" & "Conspiracy"
2016	Lonely and Horny	Ray	Episode: "Topless Maid"
2016	Bad Internet		Episode: "The Year-Long Ad Experience"
2016	CC: Social Scene	Rapper	Episode: "The Perfect Profile Picture"; also writer
2016	Angie Tribeca	Denarius	Episode: "Boyz II Dead"
2016	The Eric Andre Show	—N/a	Additional writer
2016	The Crossroads of History	—N/a	Writer; episode: "Lincoln"
2017	Michael Bolton's Big, Sexy Valentine's Day Special	Chocolatier Customer	Variety special
2017	The Chris Gethard Show	Toilet Paper Salesman	Episode: "Let's Get Scared"
2018–present	Big City Greens	Russell Remington, Brett	Recurring voice role
2020	Where's Waldo	Oliver	Voice; episode: "Trolling Through Iceland"
2021–24	Star Trek: Lower Decks	Captain Dorg / Bargh	Voice; 2 episodes
2021–22	Fairfax	Principal Weston / various	Voice; 11 episodes
2021–22	Middlemost Post	Mayor Peeve / various	Voice; 26 episodes
2022	Pivoting	Brian	5 episodes
2022, 2025	Solar Opposites	Malcolm Gladwell	Voice; 2 episodes
2022–23	Grand Crew	Michael	3 episodes
2022–25	The Recruit	Lester Kitchens	Main role
2023	History of the World, Part II	Conrad Chisholm	4 episodes
2023	The Muppets Mayhem	Barista	Episode: "Track 1: Can You Picture That?"
2023	Strange Planet	Various	Voice; episode: "Family, Fandom, Footorb"
2024	Curb Your Enthusiasm	Club Chef	Episode: "Disgruntled"
2024–25	Krapopolis	Brutus, Odin	Recurring voice role
2025	The Rookie	Matt Wallace	Episode: "The Gala"
2026	Make Some Noise	Himself	Episode: "Ben, Lisa, and Colton Have a Party"
2026	Universal Basic Guys	Hendricks (Voice)	1 episode
2026	Widow's Bay	—N/a	Supervising producer; 10 episodes and writer; episode: "What to Expect on Your Trip"
2026	Life, Larry and the Pursuit of Unhappiness	Dominic	Episode: "Farewell"
