= Lauren Ash =

Canadian actress and comedian (born 1983)

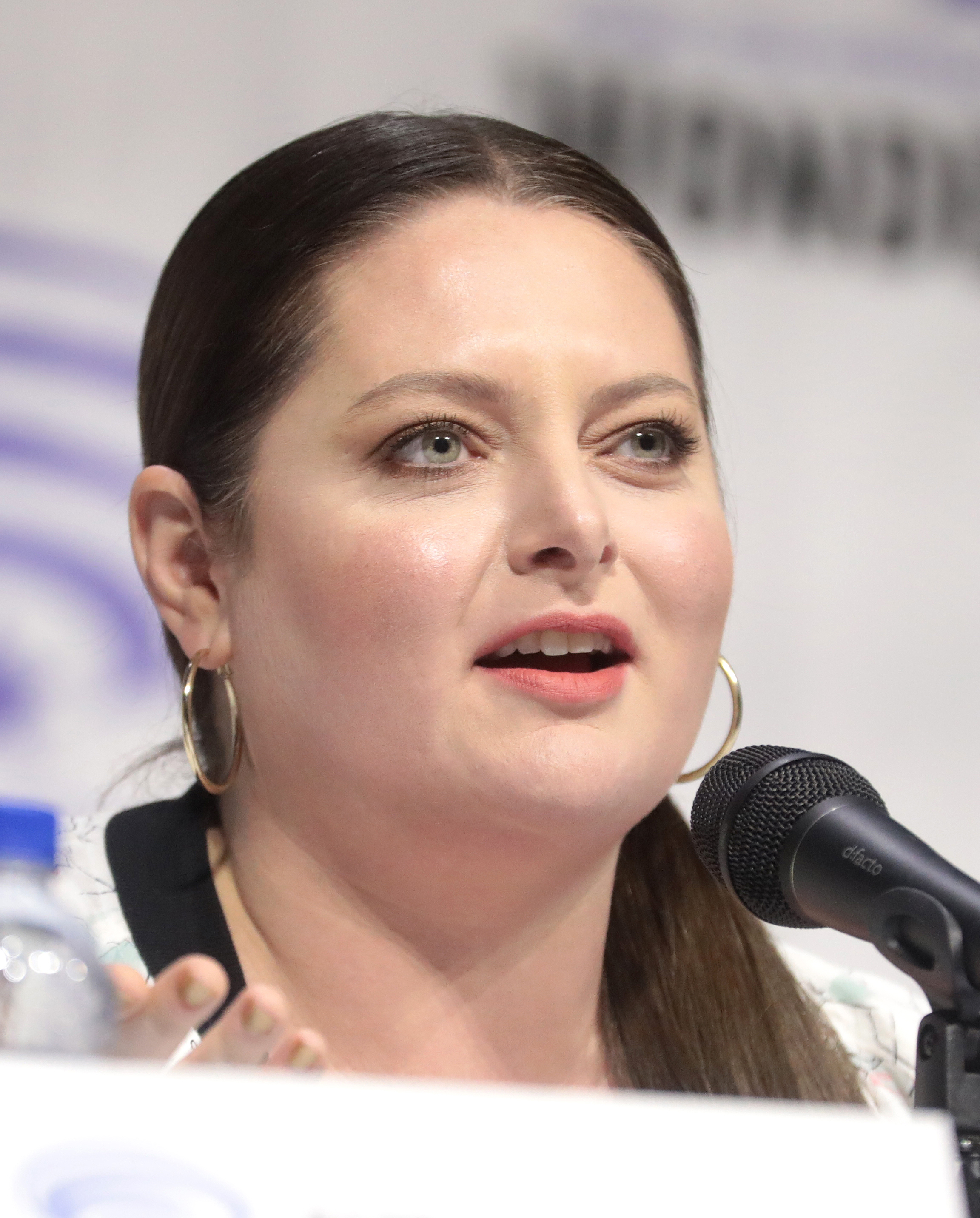
- Ash at the 2019 WonderCon
- Born: Lauren Elizabeth Ash; February 4, 1983 (age 43); Belleville, Ontario, Canada
- Occupations: Actress; musician; comedian
- Years active: 2005–present

Lauren Elizabeth Ash (born February 4, 1983) is a Canadian actress, musician, comedian and writer. Ash is best known among television audiences for her role as Dina Fox on the sitcom Superstore, in which she was also a writer for an episode. She is also an alumna of both Second City Toronto Mainstage and is one half of the sketch comedy duo "Cory!". She is a two-time Canadian Comedy Award winner for Best Female Improviser in 2006 and 2007 and has also won for Best Performance by a Female - Television for Almost Heroes in 2012 and in 2015 won Best Female Performance in a Feature Film for her role as Carol in the film Dirty Singles. Since 2020, Lauren co-hosts her own podcast, "True Crime and Cocktails" along with her cousin, Christy Oxborrow. In 2023, Ash began a music career and in September 2025 she released her debut album.

== Acting career ==
Ash has played various roles in Scare Tactics as well as the Canadian TV series Almost Heroes where she won the Canadian Comedy Award for Best Female Improviser. She also won Best Comedic Play in 2008 and Best Sketch Troupe in 2006.

She had a recurring role in The Ron James Show and made guest appearances in Lost Girl, Cracked, Bomb Girls and Call Me Fitz. Other film and television credits include Video on Trial, Hotbox and the Academy Award-nominated film Lars and the Real Girl. She was also the voice of Sam Goldman in the animated Canadian series The Dating Guy. She was part of the American sitcom Super Fun Night alongside Rebel Wilson and Liza Lapira. She previously appeared in the first season Comedy Central series Another Period as Hortense, having taken over the role from Artemis Pebdani who played her in the pilot.

She won the Canadian Screen Award for Best Supporting Actress in a Comedy Series at the 3rd Canadian Screen Awards for her appearance on Spun Out.

Ash starred as Dina Fox from 2015 to 2021 on the NBC sitcom Superstore.

From 2018 to 2020, she voiced Scorpia in She-Ra and the Princesses of Power.

In 2020, she began a weekly podcast titled True Crime and Cocktails with her cousin Christy Oxborrow.

On April 13, 2021, Variety reported that Ash had signed an overall talent and development deal with NBCUniversal. She will also write a half-hour comedy pilot with Universal Television as part of her contract. She also starred in the Netflix animated comedy Chicago Party Aunt in the same year.

In 2022, Ash has mentioned that she wrote a screenplay and she's looking to pitch her spec.

In 2023, Ash became a series regular playing Lexi Rhodes on the television show, Not Dead Yet. The show was canceled in 2024 after two seasons.

Ash is currently the host of Flavour Network's baking competition shows Halloween Bakeshop and Holiday Bakeshop.

== Music career ==
Ash entered the music field in 2023 with the release of two singles. When asked to describe her musical style, she referenced early 2000 Pop-punk and "if Gwen Stefani fronted Blink-182." In October 2023, Ash released the three song Sad This Christmas EP. In 2025, Ash released the singles and music videos for "Whiplash", "Cool Story, Bro" (the video features appearances by her former Superstore cast members) and "Dumpster Fire". In June 2025 she announced that her first studio album would be released in September 2025 and that she will tour in support of the album. In July 2025 her song "Whiplash" was nominated for Best Rock/Pop Song at the Hollywood Independent Music Awards. The awards ceremony was held on July 30, 2025, at the Avalon Hollywood.

== Filmography ==
=== Film ===
| Year | Title | Role | Notes |
|---|---|---|---|
| 2007 | Lars and the Real Girl | Holly | |
| 2008 | Camille | Waitress | |
| 2011 | Calvin's Dream | Sylvia | |
| 2012 | S is for Bird | Sunny | Short film |
| 2014 | Dirty Singles | Carol | |
| 2014 | Apple's Hack Proof iPhone | | Short film |
| 2015 | Paul Blart: Mall Cop 2 | Mindy | |
| 2017 | The Disaster Artist | Florist | |
| 2021 | Hope. | Woman | Short film; Also director |
| 2023 | Family Switch | Barb | |

=== Television ===
| Year | Title | Role | Notes |
|---|---|---|---|
| 2005–2014 | Video on Trial | Herself | Various appearances as Juror |
| 2006 | The Wilkinsons | Scarlett Tucker | |
| 2006 | Runaway | Police Officer | Episode: "There's No Place Like Home" |
| 2006 | Sketch with Kevin McDonald | Various | Television movie |
| 2007 | Across the River to Motor City | Vicki | Episode: "Walk Like a Man" |
| 2008 | Facebook of Revelations: Robot | A6 | Television short; also writer |
| 2008 | Facebook of Revelations: Puppy | Murray's Wife | Television short; also writer |
| 2008 | Facebook of Revelations: Heroes | Lenore | Television short; also writer |
| 2009 | Howie Do It | | 11 episodes |
| 2009 | Hotbox | | 3 episodes |
| 2009–2010 | The Dating Guy | Sam Goldman, Danica Morris (voices) | 26 episodes |
| 2010–2011, 2013 | The Ron James Show | | 6 episodes |
| 2011 | Almost Heroes | Bernie | 8 episodes |
| 2010–2013 | Scare Tactics | Various | 12 episodes |
| 2012 | Almost Naked Animals | Puma (voice) | 4 episodes |
| 2013 | Bomb Girls | Olga | Episode: "The Quickening" |
| 2013 | Cracked | Officer Kelly Morris | Episode: "Spirited Away" |
| 2013 | Lost Girl | Jane | Episode: "Fae-ge Against the Machine" |
| 2013 | Call Me Fitz | Sidekick Sadie | Episode: "Baby's First Brothel" |
| 2013–2014 | Super Fun Night | Marika | 17 episodes |
| 2014 | Spun Out | Julie Anderson | Episode: "Stalkblocker" |
| 2015 | Another Period | Hortense Bellacourt | 9 episodes |
| 2015–2021 | Superstore | Dina Fox | Main role, 113 episodes; also writer for the episode "Gender Reveal" |
| 2017 | Bill Nye Saves the World | Kale | Episode: "This Diet Is Bananas" |
| 2017, 2018 | Hollywood Game Night | Herself | Multiple episodes |
| 2018, 2023 | $100,000 Pyramid | Herself | Celebrity |
| 2018–2020 | She-Ra and the Princesses of Power | Scorpia (voice) | Main role |
| 2019 | Lip Sync Battle | Herself | Episode: "Ben Feldman vs. Lauren Ash" |
| 2020 | It's Pony | Officer Karen (voice) | Episode: "10 Minute Ticket" |
| 2020 | American Dad! | Paramedic (voice) | Episode: "Businessly Brunette" |
| 2021–2022 | Chicago Party Aunt | Aunt Diane (voice) | Main role |
| 2021 | Awkwafina Is Nora from Queens | Woman at Poolside | Episode: "The Simple Life" |
| 2023 | Kiff | Beryl Chatterley (voice) | Recurring role |
| 2023–2024 | Not Dead Yet | Lexi Rhodes | Series regular |
| 2024 | Hell's Kitchen | Herself | Guest diner; Episode: "Don't Be Fooled" |
| 2024 | Rock Paper Scissors | Sandpaper (voice) | Recurring role |

== Discography ==
=== Albums and EPs ===
- Sad This Christmas EP (October 2023)
- Call Me When You Get This studio album (September 2025)

=== Singles ===
- "Now I Know" (2023)
- "Umbrella (2023)
- "Sad This Christmas" (2023)
- "The One Who Got Away (2024)
- "Pathological" (2024)
- "Whiplash" (2025)
- "Cool Story, Bro" (2025)
- "Dumpster Fire" (2025)

=== Music videos ===
- "Now I Know" (2023)
- "Sad This Christmas" (2023)
- "Whiplash" (2025)
- "Cool Story, Bro" (2025)
- "Dumpster Fire" (2025)

== Awards and nominations ==
Name of the award ceremony, year presented, category, nominee(s) of the award, and the result of the nomination
| Award ceremony | Year | work(s) | Category | Result |
|---|---|---|---|---|
| Hollywood Independent Music Awards | 2025 | "Whiplash" | Best Rock/Pop Song | Nominated |
