= Nico Santos (actor) =

Filipino-American actor and comedian (born 1979)

- Occupations: Actor and comedian
- Years active: 2013–present
- Spouse: Zeke Smith (m. 2023)

Nico Santos is a Filipino-American actor and comedian known for portraying Oliver T'sien in Crazy Rich Asians and sales associate Mateo Liwanag in the NBC series Superstore. For the latter, Santos was twice consecutively nominated for the Critics' Choice Television Award for Best Supporting Actor in a Comedy Series.

== Early life ==
Santos was born in Manila, Philippines. Santos moved with his family to the United States when he was sixteen, settling in Gresham, Oregon. He and his brother attended Gresham's Centennial High School. In his junior year, he attended the Oregon Shakespeare Festival's summer seminar for high school students, where he discovered his love for theater.

Santos attended Southern Oregon University because of its proximity to the Oregon Shakespeare Festival. He studied acting there before switching to costume design due to discouraging remarks from his acting teacher. He came out as gay, his family refused to continue paying for his education, and he dropped out.

== Career ==
Santos worked for several years in the costume department as a dresser at the Oregon Shakespeare Festival.

In 2001, he moved to San Francisco, where he worked at various luxury retail stores in Union Square for eight years while doing comedy, often going to open mics after work. He later moved to Los Angeles in pursuit of a stand-up career, but found it difficult to advance due to comedy club politics.

In 2012, he started appearing regularly on Chelsea Lately, a late-night talk show, as a panelist; he also worked as a restaurant host.

Santos shifted back to acting in 2014. He landed a spot as a writer in the annual CBS Diversity Showcase, which is presented to a agents, casting directors, and other industry professionals. He did some acting after another Asian actor dropped out.

This got him invited to more auditions. In fall 2015, he debuted on the NBC comedy television show Superstore, playing Mateo Liwanag, a gay, undocumented Filipino, often mistaken as Mexican, retail store associate.

Santos performed at the Bridgetown Comedy Festival in 2017.

He had a supporting role, Oliver, in the 2018 romantic comedy Crazy Rich Asians.

In spring 2019, Santos appeared in the Off-Broadway play Happy Talk, written by Jesse Eisenberg and directed by Scott Elliott.

In June 2022, Santos was cast in Guardians of the Galaxy Vol. 3 as Recorder Theel.

== Personal life ==
Santos is gay and married to Zeke Smith, who participated on the 33rd (Millennials vs. Gen X) and 34th (Game Changers) editions of the CBS reality game show Survivor.

The couple met in April 2018 at the GLAAD Media Awards. Queerty named Santos one of the Pride50 "trailblazing individuals who actively ensure society remains moving towards equality, acceptance and dignity for all queer people."

Santos's parents were undocumented before becoming citizens. Santos's mother is supportive of his career and has often attended his open-mic performances.

During the COVID-19 pandemic, Santos' mother and stepfather contracted the virus. His stepfather died while his mother recovered.

== Filmography ==
Key
†	Denotes works that have not yet been released

Film
Year	Title	Role	Notes
2015	Paul Blart: Mall Cop 2	Heath	
2017	The Clapper	Buffet Person	
2018	Crazy Rich Asians	Oliver T'sien	
2021	Wish Dragon	Buckley (voice)	
2023	Guardians of the Galaxy Vol. 3	Recorder Theel	
2023	Happiness for Beginners	Hugh	
2023	The Re-Education of Molly Singer	Pauly	
2026	Roommates	Professor Carasco	

Television
Year	Title	Role	Notes
2012-2013	Chelsea Lately	Himself	Talk Show Roundtable
2014	Ground Floor	Airline Attendant	Episode: "The Decision: Part Two"
2014	Go-Go Boy Interrupted	Nick	4 Episodes
2014	2 Broke Girls	Barry	Episode: "And a Loan for Christmas"
2015–2021	Superstore	Mateo Fernando Aquino Liwanag	Main Role, 113 episodes; Critics' Choice Television Award for Best Supporting Actor in a Comedy Series (2018, 2019)
2016	Noches con Platanito	Himself	Episode: "Lauren Ash/Nico Santos/Damiana Villa/Carlie Craig/Voces del Rancho"
2019-2020	25 Words or Less	Himself	6 episodes
2020	A Little Late with Lilly Singh	Himself	Episode: "Nico Santos, Sabrina Jalees"
2020-2021	The Kelly Clarkson Show	Himself	2 episodes
2021	The Prince	Robert (voice)	2 episodes
2022	Tuca & Bertie	Jamie (voice)	2 episodes
2023	The Muppets Mayhem	Jackson Cannery	Episode: "Track 10: We Will Rock You"
2023	Hailey's On It!	Jonathan (voice)	Recurring role
2023	Is It Cake?	Himself	Episode: "Body By Cake"
2023	The Boss Baby: Back in the Crib	Banker Baby Benny	6 episodes
2024	Not Dead Yet	Teddy Thompson	Episode: "Not Owning it Yet"
2024	After Midnight	Himself	Episode: "Billy Eichner, Nico Santos, Pete Holmes"
2024-25	St. Denis Medical	Rene	2 episodes
2025	Night Court	Dr. Nitelife	Season 3 episode 9 "Ab-ventures in Babysitting"
2025	The Z-Suite	Doug	8 episodes
2025	Krapopolis	Mangela (voice)	Episode: “Nike (The Goddness)”
