= Justin Spitzer =

American screenwriter and producer

- Occupations: Screenwriter, producer
- Years active: 2004–present
- Spouse: Jenna Bans (m. 2007)
- Children: 2

Justin Spitzer is an American television and film writer, producer, and showrunner. He is best known for creating the sitcoms Superstore, American Auto, and St. Denis Medical. His other credits include Scrubs, Courting Alex, and The Office.

== Career ==
Spitzer was an assistant on the sitcom Grounded for Life and on fourteen episodes of the American adaptation of Queer as Folk. From 2008 to 2013, he was a writer and producer for the American adaptation of The Office. In 2013 he wrote a pilot based on The Money Pit that was put into development by NBC but ultimately never aired.

He created the workplace sitcom Superstore, starring America Ferrera and Ben Feldman, which had a midseason premiere on NBC in 2015. He served as showrunner for three seasons before stepping down in 2019 while signing a multi-year deal with NBC and Universal Television. The series continued to run for three more seasons after Spitzer's departure.

In 2020, NBC ordered a pilot for Spitzer's comedy American Auto. The series premiered in 2021 and ran for two seasons before being canceled in 2023. In August 2021, Spitzer had signed a new four-year overall deal with Universal Television.

== Personal life ==
On November 24, 2007, he married producer and writer Jenna Bans. They have two children named Lucy and Phoebe.

He graduated from the Northwestern University School of Communication in 1999.

== Credits ==
=== Producing ===
Television
Year	Title	Notes
2005–2013	The Office	co-executive producer
2014	Mulaney	co-executive producer
2015–2021	Superstore	executive producer, also creator
2021–2023	American Auto	executive producer, also creator
2024–	St. Denis Medical	executive producer, also creator

Television Movie
Year	Title	Notes
2013	Holding Patterns	executive producer

=== Writing ===
Films
Year	Title	Notes
2006	What Are the Odds?	short film

Television
Show	Episode Title	Season	Air Date	Notes
Scrubs	"My Butterfly"	3	March 16, 2004	
Committed	"The Snap Out of it Episode"	1	February 1, 2005	
Courting Alex	"Birthday"	1	March 6, 2006	
The Office	"Back from Vacation"	3	January 4, 2007	
The Office	"Product Recall"	3	April 26, 2007	co-written with Brent Forrester
The Office	"Did I Stutter?"	4	May 1, 2008	co-written with Brent Forrester
The Office	"Moroccan Christmas"	5	December 11, 2008	
The Office	"Michael Scott Paper Company"	5	April 9, 2009	
The Office	"Shareholder Meeting"	6	November 19, 2009	
The Office	"Body Language"	6	April 29, 2010	
The Office	"Costume Contest"	7	October 28, 2010	
The Office	"Dwight K. Schrute, (Acting) Manager"	7	May 12, 2011	
The Office	"Garden Party"	8	October 13, 2011	
The Office	"Angry Andy"	8	April 19, 2012	
The Money Pit	"Pilot"	1		unaired
Mulaney	"Patriot Acts"	1	November 23, 2014	
Superstore	"Pilot"	1	November 30, 2015	
Superstore	"Shots and Salsa"	1	November 30, 2015	
Superstore	"Tornado"	2	May 4, 2017	
Superstore	"Grand Re-Opening"	3	September 28, 2017	
Superstore	"Town Hall"	3	May 3, 2018	Story credit
Superstore	"Employee Appreciation Day"	4	May 16, 2019	
Superstore	"All Sales Final"	6	March 25, 2021	Story credit
American Auto	"Pilot"	1	December 13, 2021	
American Auto	"White Van"	1	December 13, 2021	
American Auto	"Profile"	1	March 8, 2022	co-written with Eric Ledgin
American Auto	"Crisis"	2	January 24, 2023	co-written with Eric Ledgin
St. Denis Medical	"Welcome to St. Denis"	1	November 12, 2024	co-written with Eric Ledgin
St. Denis Medical	"People Just Say Stuff Online"	1	February 4, 2025	co-written with Eric Ledgin

Television Movie
Year	Title	Notes
2013	Holding Patterns	also credited as creator

=== Directing ===
Show	Episode title	Season	Air date	Notes
Superstore	"Employee App"	5	February 20, 2020	

== Nominations ==
Television
Year	Association	Category	Work	Result	Credited As	Ref.
2009	Primetime Emmy Awards	Outstanding Comedy Series	The Office	Nominated	Producer	
2010	Primetime Emmy Awards	Outstanding Comedy Series	The Office	Nominated	Producer	
2011	Primetime Emmy Awards	Outstanding Comedy Series	The Office	Nominated	Supervising Producer	
2022	Writers Guild of America Award	Episodic Comedy	Superstore	Nominated	Teleplay	
