= Kaliko Kauahi =

American actress

- Born: January 11, 1974 (age 52); Lawai, Hawaii, U.S.
- Education: Loyola Marymount University
- Occupation: Actress
- Years active: 2007–present

Kaliko Kauahi is an American actress best known for her role as Sandra Kaluiokalani in NBC's comedy television series Superstore (2015–2021). Additionally, she played the recurring role of Principal Kwan in the Disney Channel series Raven's Home (2018–2019) and has appeared in numerous television shows such as Parks and Recreation and iCarly. She is currently portraying the role of Nurse Val on the NBC sitcom St. Denis Medical.

== Early life ==
Kauahi was born and raised in Lawai Valley on Kaua'i, Hawai'i's south side. She was a boarding student at Kamehameha Schools in Honolulu. She attended Loyola Marymount University, studying communications and recording arts.

== Career ==
Kauahi enrolled in acting classes and began pursuing an acting career in her late 20s, saying: "It just took me that long to admit to myself that this is what I wanted to do and to get over the fear." She first appeared in short films, and landed guest roles on television shows such as Modern Family (2011), Parks and Recreation (2013), The Big Bang Theory (2014), and Brooklyn Nine-Nine (2015). In 2015, she was cast in the recurring role of Sandra on NBC's workplace sitcom Superstore. On May 22, 2019, NBC announced she had been promoted to a series regular for season 5; she remained a series regular for the show’s sixth and final season.

She portrayed Principal Kwan in the Disney Channel television series Raven's Home (2018–2019). She had a guest role as Tammy, a patient and practical animal handler in the NBC sitcom American Auto (2023), in the episode "Dealer Event". In 2023, she also appeared as Danica in Paramount+'s comedy series iCarly, a revival series based on the 2007 Nickelodeon series of the same name. Her appearance on the show was well-received with fans hoping for her character's return for the fourth season. She landed one of the main roles on NBC's medical comedy series St. Denis Medical, which premiered on November 12, 2024. The show follows doctors and nurses at a hospital in Oregon and Kauahi plays a veteran nurse Val. It was renewed for a third season.

== Filmography ==
=== Film ===
Year	Title	Role	Notes
2008	Bad Mother's Handbook	Korean Lunch Guest	TV movie
2009	Tales from the Catholic Church of Elvis!	Obstetric Nurse/Calculus Teacher	
2010	Birds of a Feather	Female Japanese Tourist	TV movie
2011	Birds of a Feather	Hitomi	
2011	Hall Pass	Chief	

=== Television ===
Year	Title	Role	Notes
2007	Mystery ER	Dr. Christine Todd	Episode: "Bittersweet/Ring of Fire"
2007	Chuck	Angry Woman	Episode: "Chuck Versus the Sandworm"
2010	Chuck	Customer	Episode: "Chuck Versus the Living Dead"
2011	Modern Family	Pedicurist	Episode: "Two Monkeys and a Panda"
2011	Southland	Saleswoman	Episode: "Let It Snow"
2013	Don't Trust the B— in Apartment 23	Mrs. Nguyen	Episode: "The Leak"
2013	Parks and Recreation	Khongordzol	2 episodes
2013	Welcome to Hollywood...Florida	Hawaii Five 0	Television Movie
2014	Jimmy Kimmel Live!	Kaliko/Security Guard	Episode: "Jennifer Love Hewitt/Clark Gregg/Clean Bandit"
2014	The Big Bang Theory	Marta	Episode: "The Gorilla Dissolution"
2014	Legit	Jim's Masseuse	1 episode
2014	2 Broke Girls	Booth Woman	1 episode
2015	Brooklyn Nine-Nine	Brenda Hix	Episode: "Ava"
2015	Kroll Show	Mother McMilin	Episode: "The Commonwealth Games"
2015–2021	Superstore	Sandra Kaluiokalani	97 episodes; Main cast seasons 5–6, recurring seasons 1–4
2016	The Soul Man	Window Lady #1	1 episode
2016	Angel from Hell	Jackie	Episode: "Go With Your Gut"
2018–2019	Raven's Home	Principal Kwan	4 episodes
2019	Matt and Dan	Caitlyn	Episode: "Cookie Girl"
2022	Ghosts	Sherry	Episode: "The Liquor License"
2023	American Auto	Tammy	Episode: "Dealer Event"
2023	iCarly	Danica	Episodes: "iGo to Toledo" and "iHave a Proposal"
2024–present	St. Denis Medical	Val	Main role; 34 episodes
