= Labour =

Labour or labor may refer to:

- Childbirth, the delivery of a baby
- Work (human activity), or labour
  - Manual labour, physical work
  - Wage labour, a socioeconomic relationship between a worker and an employer
  - Organized labour and the labour movement, consisting principally of labour unions
  - Labour Party (disambiguation) or Labor Party, a name used by several political parties

== Literature ==
- Labor (journal), an American quarterly on the history of the labor movement
- Labour/Le Travail, an academic journal focusing on the Canadian labour movement
- Labor (Tolstoy book) or The Triumph of the Farmer or Industry and Parasitism (1888)

== Places ==
- La Labor, Honduras
- Labor, Koper, Slovenia

== Other uses ==
- Labour (song), 2023 single by Paris Paloma
- Labor (album), a 2013 album by MEN
- Labor (area), a Spanish customary unit
- "Labor", an episode of TV series Superstore
- Labour (constituency), a functional constituency in Hong Kong elections
- Labors, fictional robots in Patlabor
- "Laboring" (Friday Night Lights), an episode of the TV series Friday Night Lights

== People with the surname ==
- Earle Labor (1928–2022), professor of American literature
- Jérémy Labor (born 1992), French footballer
- Josef Labor (1842–1924), Austrian musician and composer
- Larry Labor, American politician

== See also ==
- Labour Day (disambiguation)
- Labour law
- Labour organization
- Work (disambiguation)
