= Bondarev =

Bondarev (masculine, Cyrillic: Бондарев), also transliterated Bondariew and Bondaryev, or Bondareva (feminine, Cyrillic: Бондарева) is a Russian and Ukrainian surname, derived from the word "бондарь" (cooper). Notable people with the surname include:

- Aleksei Bondarev (born 1987), Russian footballer
- Alexei Bondarev (born 1983), Kazakhstani ice hockey player
- Arseny Bondarev (born 1985), Russian ice hockey player
- Bogdan Bondariew (born 1974), Ukrainian cyclist
- Boris Bondarev (born 1980), Russian diplomat
- Kostyantyn Bondaryev (born 1972), Ukrainian politician
- Lev Bondarev (1932–2005), Russian geographer
- Olga Bondareva(1937–1991), Russian mathematician and economist
- Stanislav Bondarev (born 1968), Russian footballer
- Timofei Bondarev (1820 – 1898), Russian philosopher
- Viktor Bondarev (born 1959), Russian Air Force general
- Vitaliy Bondarev (born 1985), Ukrainian footballer
- Yuri Bondarev (1924–2020), Russian writer

== See also ==
- Igors Bondarevs (born 1974), Latvian ice hockey player
