= Labour Day (disambiguation) =

Labour Day, or Labor Day, is an annual holiday to celebrate the achievements of the workers.

Labor Day or Labour Day may also refer to:

== Holidays ==
- International Workers' Day or Labour Day
- Labour Day (Singapore)
- Labour Day (Canada)
- Labor Day (United States)

== Other uses ==
- Labor Days, a 2001 album by Aesop Rock
- Labour Day (album), a 1988 album by Spirit of the West
- Labor Day (novel), a 2009 novel by Joyce Maynard
  - Labor Day (film), a 2013 film based on the novel
- "Labor Day" (Roseanne), a 1994 television episode
- "Labour Day" (Class of the Titans), a 2006 television episode
- "Labor Day (It's a Holiday)", a song by Black Eyed Peas from Elephunk

== See also ==
- 1935 Labor Day hurricane
- Labor Day in Spain
  - Labor Day in Toledo, Spain
- Mayday (disambiguation)
