= Safety Training =

Safety training provides training for occupational safety and health.

Safety Training may also refer to:

- "Safety Training" (The Office), an episode of the American television series The Office
- "Safety Training" (Superstore), an episode of the American television series Superstore
