= Mayday (disambiguation) =

Mayday, or m'aidez, is an international distress signal.

Mayday, or May Day may also refer to:

== Common uses ==
- May Day, a traditional spring festival held on or around May 1
- May Day or International Workers' Day, an international labor celebration held on May 1

== Arts and entertainment ==
=== Fictional characters ===
- Sam Malone, nicknamed "Mayday", the main character of the television series Cheers
- Mayday Parker, the daughter of Spider-Man in MC2 (Marvel Comics 2)
- May Day (James Bond), a character in the film A View to a Kill, played by Grace Jones
- Mayday, a clone trooper in the animated series Star Wars: The Bad Batch, voiced by Dee Bradley Baker
- Verosika Mayday, a demon in the animated series Helluva Boss, voiced by Cristina Vee

=== Film and television ===
- Mayday (2005 film), an American television film
- Mayday (2021 film), an American film
- Mayday (2026 film), an American film
- Mayday (Canadian TV series), a 2003 documentary series about aviation disasters
- Mayday (British TV series), a 2013 BBC television drama thriller

=== Games ===
- Mayday (game), a 1978 board wargame
- Mayday! Deep Space, a science fiction video game

=== Literature ===
- May Day (play), a comedy play written by George Chapman, first published in 1611
- "May Day" (short story), a 1920 short story by F. Scott Fitzgerald
- May Day, a 1936 novel by John Sommerfield
- Mayday (novel), a 1979 novel by Tom Block and Nelson DeMille
- "Mayday", a short story by William Faulkner renamed Soldiers' Pay, published in 1926

=== Paintings ===
- May Day (painting), an 1812 painting by the British artist William Collins
- Punch or May Day, an 1829 painting by the British artist Benjamin Robert Haydon

=== Music ===
- Mayday (music festival), an electronic music festival

==== Groups ====
- Mayday (Nebraska band), an American rock band
- Mayday (Taiwanese band), a Taiwanese rock band
- ¡Mayday!, an American hip hop group
- Derrick May (musician) (born 1963), American electronic musician also known as "Mayday"

==== Albums ====
- May Day (Matt Pryor album), 2012
- May Day (Matthew Ryan album), 1997
- Mayday (Boys Noize album), 2016
- Mayday (Casey Barnes album), 2024
- Mayday (Hugh Cornwell album), 1999
- Mayday (Myriam Gendron album), 2024
- Mayday (King Cobb Steelie album), 2000
- Mayday (Mark Seymour album), 2015
- Mayday (Troop album), 1998
- Mayday, by The Cells, 2006
- Mayday (single album), by Victon, 2020, or its title track

==== Songs ====
- "May Day", by Chumbawamba from Tubthumper
- "May Day", by Dispatch from Silent Steeples
- "May Day!", by Elvis Perkins from Ash Wednesday
- "Mayday" (April song), 2017
- "Mayday" (Bump of Chicken song), 2007
- "Mayday" (Cam song), 2016
- "Mayday" (Lecrae song), 2012
- "Mayday" (Coldrain song), 2019
- "Mayday" (Three Days Grace song), 2024
- "Mayday", by TheFatRat, 2018
- "Mayday", by Dannic & Lucky Date, featuring Harrison
- "Mayday", by The Go! Team from Semicircle
- "Mayday", by The Libertines from I Get Along EP
- "Mayday", by The Player Piano from Satellite
- "Mayday", by Tomahawk from Mit Gas
- "Mayday!!", by Flobots from Fight with Tools

== Places ==
- May Day, Kansas, United States
- Mayday, Colorado, United States

== Other uses ==
- May Day (Washington College), a tradition at Washington College in Chestertown, Maryland
- Elly Mayday (1988–2019), stage name of Canadian model Ashley Shandrel Luther
- Mayday feature, a prominent feature of Amazon's Kindle Fire HDX device
- Mayday PAC, a crowd-funded, political action committee (PAC) in the United States
- Mayday Rescue Foundation whose chief activity was running the White Helmets organization
- Mayday Hospital, former name of Croydon University Hospital, south London
- Prunus padus, or May Day tree

== See also ==
- The Prince's May Day Network, climate change body in the UK
- Maiday, an English singer-songwriter
- May Days, a period of violence in Barcelona, Spain during the Spanish Civil War
