= Gender Reveal =

Gender Reveal may refer to:

- Gender reveal party
- Transgender § Coming out
- "Gender Reveal" (The Good Doctor), 2021 TV episode
- "Gender Reveal" (Superstore), 2018 TV episode
- Gender Reveal (film)

== See also ==
- Gender Reveal Fire (disambiguation)
