= Superstore season 2 =

Season of television series

Superstore
- Season 2
- Promotional poster
- Starring: America Ferrera; Ben Feldman; Lauren Ash; Colton Dunn; Nico Santos; Nichole Bloom; Mark McKinney
- No. of episodes: 21

Release
- Original network: NBC
- Original release: September 22, 2016 – May 4, 2017

Season chronology
- ← Previous; Season 1 Next → Season 3

The second season of the American television series Superstore was ordered on February 23, 2016. On May 15, 2016, NBC announced that Superstore would be moving to Thursdays in the 8 p.m. time slot, leading off NBC's Thursday night primetime programming in the 2016–17 season. The season premiered on September 22, 2016, and concluded on May 4, 2017. On September 23, 2016, NBC gave the series a full season order of 21 episodes.

Superstore follows a group of employees working at Cloud 9, a fictional big-box store in St. Louis, Missouri. The ensemble and supporting cast features America Ferrera, Ben Feldman, Lauren Ash, Colton Dunn, Nico Santos, Nichole Sakura and Mark McKinney.

== Cast ==
=== Main ===
- America Ferrera as Amy Dubanowski
- Ben Feldman as Jonah Simms
- Lauren Ash as Dina Fox
- Colton Dunn as Garrett McNeil
- Nico Santos as Mateo Fernando Aquino Liwanag
- Nichole Bloom as Cheyenne Tyler Lee
- Mark McKinney as Glenn Sturgis

=== Recurring ===
- Johnny Pemberton as Bo Derek Thompson
- Kaliko Kauahi as Sandra
- Josh Lawson as Tate
- Michael Bunin as Jeff Sutton
- Ryan Gaul as Adam Dubanowski
- Jon Barinholtz as Marcus

=== Co-starring ===
- Linda Porter as Myrtle
- Irene White as Carol
- Kelly Schumann as Justine

=== Guest ===
- Cecily Strong as Missy Jones

== Episodes ==
No. overall	No. in season	Title	Directed by	Written by	Original release date	US viewers (millions)
12	1	"Olympics"	Ruben Fleischer	Jonathan Green	August 19, 2016	9.67
In a special episode taking place in the middle of the season 1 timeline, Cloud 9 celebrates the Summer Olympic Games with an Olympic themed promotion. After Glenn organizes the store's Opening Ceremony with disastrous results, Dina offers to plan an over-the-top Closing Ceremony. Meanwhile, Glenn struggles with what the games are truly about, and Mateo and Jonah discover that Mateo is undocumented. Amy learns that her childhood Olympic hero Missy Jones (guest star Cecily Strong) is stopping by Cloud 9 to promote her new book, and Cheyenne gets down on herself for not being as successful as Missy was at her age. Tara Lipinski, Apolo Ohno, and McKayla Maroney also make cameo appearances. Amy's name tag: Gemma
13	2	"Strike"	Victor Nelli, Jr.	Jackie Clarke	September 22, 2016	5.45
The employee walkout in protest of Glenn's firing prompts District Manager Jeff Sutin (Michael Bunin) to visit the store. He meets with Amy and Jonah, offering everyone's job back including Glenn's, but on the condition that they sign a written apology and have everything go back to normal. This doesn't sit well with Amy and Jonah, so they organize a full-fledged strike. Meanwhile, Garrett hits it off with a woman who showed up to support the strike, but is dismayed when he learns her real beef is against transgender rights. Dina tries hard to get on Jeff's good side, unsuccessfully attempting to break the strike. Eventually, Jeff convinces most of the striking employees to return to work, leaving only Amy and Jonah on the picket line. The two ultimately also decide to go back to work, resolving to fight Cloud 9 from within. Amy's name tag: Amy (carry-over from S1E11)
14	3	"Back to Work"	Michael McDonald	Eric Ledgin	September 29, 2016	4.39
Following the strike, the employees at Cloud 9 return to work and do everything possible to impress Jeff. Amy seeks the help of employee Marcus to run the deli, and asks him to run the meat slicer despite not being trained to do so. Marcus cuts off his own thumb, and Amy tries to get him to the hospital while simultaneously trying to hide the incident from Jeff. Jonah works with Dina to help her write an apology letter and win back the employees she betrayed in the strike, but Dina insists she isn't sorry. Glenn tries his best to prove to Jeff he is a tough, strict boss, while Mateo just wants Jeff to notice his hard work. Meanwhile, Cheyenne returns to Cloud 9 during her maternity leave as a customer, but becomes an unwilling employee again. Amy's name tag: Louise
15	4	"Guns, Pills and Birds"	Matt Sohn	Matt Hubbard	October 6, 2016	5.18
Jonah is assigned to manning the gun counter despite his protests that he is morally opposed to guns. After learning he can refuse to sell a gun to any person he is suspicious of, Jonah starts refusing sales to everyone, causing a gun rights group to protest at Cloud 9. When a crow flies into the store, Dina, Mateo and Garrett team up to get it out. Glenn learns the Cloud 9 pharmacy sells the morning after pill and tries to prevent customers from buying them. Meanwhile, Amy's husband Adam is taking their daughter camping, and Amy is looking forward to a weekend lounging alone at home. But Adam decides to back out when he gets tickets to a conference, causing Amy to take out her frustrations on Jonah and the staff. In a final mishap, Dina captures the crow in a sack and asks Mateo to set it free but through a miscommunication Mateo instead smashes the bird against the floor until it's dead. Amy's name tag: Rachel
16	5	"Spokesman Scandal"	Ken Whittingham	Gabe Miller	October 13, 2016	4.39
A scandal erupts at Cloud 9 when their advertising spokesman Kyle (Nate Torrence) is accused of murdering people and eating their flesh. Glenn learns that marijuana was found in Kyle's possession and thinks he only murdered people because he was high, prompting him to order drug tests for all employees. Dina is more than willing to administer the urine tests. Amy and Jonah have a fun day daring each other to perform various pranks, while Mateo tries to confirm that Jeff is interested in him romantically. When Jeff finally invites him to dinner, however, Mateo is more excited about being right than he is in dating Jeff. Elsewhere, Cheyenne returns to work following her maternity leave and begins to annoy Garrett and Sandra with her baby photos. Amy's name tag: Ella / Heidi
17	6	"Dog Adoption Day"	Betsy Thomas	Josh Malmuth	October 20, 2016	4.18
It's Dog Adoption Day at Cloud 9 and Jonah and Mateo volunteer to help run it. They later find out that any unadopted dogs will be euthanized at the end of the day, so they compete with each other to find homes for all of them. Meanwhile, Amy and Glenn see Cheyenne and Bo fighting about their relationship, and try to help them in different ways. Glenn offers to have the two get married in his church, encouraging Bo to move out of Cheyenne's parents' basement and rent a house. Amy tries to encourage Cheyenne to date more mature guys, which backfires when Cheyenne rekindles a relationship with her high school teacher. Also, after being told by Dina he will lose two hours of pay because he forgot to punch in for work, Garrett watches Dina's every move to make sure she is doing everything by the book. Amy's name tag: Patti
18	7	"Halloween Theft"	Alisa Statman	Karey Dornetto	October 27, 2016	4.21
The Halloween festivities at Cloud 9 are put on hold when Dina launches a full scale investigation into who stole fruit from a backroom storage area. Amy is determined to help find the person responsible so she can get home in time for trick-or-treating with her daughter, Emma. Garrett is flustered over Dina's scandalous Halloween costume, and hates himself for it. Jonah and Cheyenne bond over store gossip, and Cheyenne tells Jonah that everyone thinks he has a crush on Amy. Meanwhile, Mateo tries to prepare a secret date with Jeff. Amy's name tag: None (in Halloween costume)
19	8	"Election Day"	Tristram Shapeero	Bridget Kyle & Vicky Luu	November 3, 2016	3.58
It is Election Day and Cloud 9 becomes an official polling place. Amy and Jonah are not happy with the blatant candidate recommendations in Cloud 9's official voting guide, so they work together to encourage shoppers and co-workers to vote for a candidate that is more labor-friendly. Meanwhile, Dina and Glenn accidentally ruin some ballots and try to cover it up by throwing them out, which causes stress when they learn they could go to jail. Mateo tries to cover his undocumented status by stealing an "I Voted" sticker and telling everyone that he did vote. Also, Amy meets Jonah's new girlfriend Naomi (Azie Tesfai). Amy's name tag: Millie
20	9	"Seasonal Help"	Geeta V. Patel	Jackie Clarke	November 10, 2016	4.01
It's the holiday season at Cloud 9 and Glenn and Dina hire a bunch of seasonal workers, including Adam, Amy's husband. Meanwhile, Garrett and Dina reveal to Jonah that they make an annual wager on which seasonal employee will quit or be fired first, which stokes Jonah's old gambling addiction. Jonah bands all the employees together for a pool and pushes his choice to quit, but it backfires when he learns the employees are all from a "last chance" program at Glenn's church. Multiple employees hint that Amy and Adam's marriage might be in trouble, which pushes Amy to try and prove otherwise by hooking up with Adam in the photo lab. Also, Glenn conducts interviews to hire the perfect store Santa, but ends up hiring Cody. Amy's name tag: Joanne
21	10	"Black Friday"	Victor Nelli Jr.	Eric Ledgin	November 10, 2016	3.79
The Cloud 9 crew deals with the rush of the Black Friday sale. Amy begins to feel sick and suspects that she might be pregnant, causing her to re-evaluate her marriage to Adam. Her sickness turns out to be food poisoning from the staff potluck held before opening hours, which spreads throughout the employees. Jonah uses a video camera to document his first Black Friday sale as an employee. Meanwhile, Garrett begins to get annoyed with Dina suggesting he work harder, but takes charge when the remaining employees give up on working. Garrett and Dina later share a kiss. Glenn takes his wife's muscle relaxers to deal with the stress of Black Friday and shares what's really on his mind. Mateo and Cheyenne take bribes from customers who want sought-after gift items. Amy's name tag: Brittany
22	11	"Lost and Found"	Jay Chandrasekhar	Sierra Teller Ornelas	January 5, 2017	4.43
Cloud 9 celebrates New Year's Day with their annual Lost & Found giveaway, where they give away items left behind by customers to the employees. Amy winds up with a men's jacket, and trades it to Mateo for a pair of cargo shorts. In the shorts, she finds a wad of cash, and Jonah tries to convince her to use the money on something nice for herself. Amy instead is pressured into using the money to upgrading the employee break room; the situation complicates when Sandra backtracks a receipt found in the shorts to locate the customer who lost the money. Elsewhere, Garrett and Dina discuss their recent romantic encounter, while Glenn tries everything to cheer up employees after corporate sends a memo about seasonal affective disorder. Glenn is mostly unsuccessful, but he does cheer up Amy by lending an ear and letting her vent about her recent problems with Adam. Amy's name tag: Bobbie
23	12	"Rebranding"	Bill Purple	Matt Hubbard	January 12, 2017	4.33
Jeff announces that Cloud 9 is rebranding its store brand products from Halo to Super Cloud, and says a Cloud 9 Vice President is arriving to help out with the transition. Jonah then realizes that the VP is Rex (guest star Ravi Patel), one of his Business school friends, and he contemplates going back and finishing his degree. With the Halo products on clearance, Cheyenne scrambles to buy the discounted baby products for Harmonica while working. Mateo accidentally reveals to Jeff a nasty comment Dina made about him. To cover himself, Mateo leads Dina to believe that Sandra is romantically involved with Jeff and might be the snitch. Amy's name tag: Margaret
24	13	"Ladies' Lunch"	Todd Biermann	Vanessa Ramos	February 2, 2017	3.99
Glenn accidentally reveals to all the employees that Amy is in marriage counseling after she has come to work late several times. To cheer Amy up, Dina invites her and the women of Cloud 9 to a luncheon to talk about their feelings. Meanwhile, Jonah and Garrett create a game with the rest of the male employees to pass the time after their credit card system goes down and the store is limited to serving cash-only customers. Sandra continues her fake relationship with Jeff, which annoys Mateo and costs herself a shot at real love. Amy's name tag: Connie
25	14	"Valentine's Day"	Tristram Shapeero	John Kazlauskas	February 9, 2017	3.54
It's Valentine's Day at Cloud 9, and Glenn and Amy are in the sprit of matchmaking. Amy enlists Glenn's help to set up Myrtle with elderly door greeter Arthur (Bernie Kopell), which backfires when Amy discovers that Arthur made sexual remarks toward Myrtle. Meanwhile, with Dina's help, Jonah goes undercover to expose a suspected shoplifter, but he later asks the woman out on a date. Cheyenne takes on a new role as a door greeter, Sandra shows off lavish Valentine's gifts "from Jeff", and Garrett learns who Jeff is really dating and decides to have some fun with Mateo. Amy's name tag: Peggy
26	15	"Super Hot Store"	Michael Spiller	Joe Barrasas	February 16, 2017	3.67
The Cloud 9 store heating system malfunctions, which amplifies the negative attitudes of all the employees. Amy discovers a yogurt spill and asks Marcus, who was recently promoted to the warehouse, to clean it up. When he starts giving her attitude, Amy fires Marcus. The other warehouse employees walk out in protest, so Amy and Jonah recruit some employees to help unload a grocery truck. When corporate can't figure out the glitch that's causing the heating system to malfunction, Glenn takes matters into his own hands by attempting the repair the system himself. Dina and Garrett pass the time in Glenn's air-conditioned office and have another sexual encounter. Amy's name tag: Karen
27	16	"Wellness Fair"	Alex Reid	Owen Ellickson	February 23, 2017	3.51
Amy fake calls in sick to work so she can go to the movies with her daughter, and finds Mateo on a date with Jeff. Thinking that Jeff is cheating on Sandra, Amy confronts Mateo, who confesses that he is the one dating Jeff. Sandra later admits that her relationship with Jeff is fake, and Dina reveals she has been having sex with Garrett. Meanwhile, a wellness fair event is going on at Cloud 9, and Glenn becomes annoyed when Jonah implies that he knows more than Glenn. Amy's name tag: Lucinda
28	17	"Integrity Award"	Linda Mendoza	Gabe Miller	March 16, 2017	4.17
Glenn announces that the Cloud 9 employees must vote for one employee to win the store's Integrity Award, and goes to great lengths to get himself nominated, but becomes jealous when Garrett rescues a war hero's lost dog. Meanwhile, Jonah tags along with Amy and meets her parents while they try to pack up their house and move. Dina takes advantage of Mateo's relationship with Jeff by asking Mateo to get Jeff to fix up the store, including hiring an exterminator for the break room. When Mateo is unsuccessful, he tries to take matters into his own hands and sets off many industrial size bug bombs. At the end of the episode, Jeff says corporate has decided that Mateo must transfer to a store outside his district if they are to continue their relationship. Amy's name tag: Cici
29	18	"Mateo's Last Day"	America Ferrera	Jonathan Green	March 23, 2017	4.15
Mateo decides to take a promotion at a Cloud 9 signature store but hits a roadblock when his undocumented status comes to light. He asks Jonah and Cheyenne to find ways for him to become legal. Meanwhile, Amy and Glenn contact a Cloud 9 customer who wrote mean comments about the store on Yelp, and Dina and Garrett deal with corporate about their relationship. Mateo is not able to tell Jeff that he is undocumented, and tells Jeff that he does not love him, ending their relationship and Mateo's promotion plans. Amy's name tag: Marlow
30	19	"Glenn's Kids"	Ruben Fleischer	Sierra Teller Ornelas	April 6, 2017	3.08
Chaos hits Cloud 9 when Glenn brings his foster children to the store to take a family portrait for his wife Jerusha's birthday. Glenn expresses his disapproval to Amy when he sees Jonah and his oldest foster child, Kristen (guest star Brenda Song), hitting it off, but cannot bring himself to admit it to either of them. Amy tries to handle the conflict discreetly. Meanwhile, Cheyenne seeks help from Dina and Garrett when she loses Glenn's youngest child while babysitting. Mateo tricks some of the kids into doing his job while he continues to mourn his break up with Jeff. Amy's name tag: Susan
31	20	"Spring Cleaning"	Geeta V. Patel	Josh Malmuth	April 20, 2017	3.15
During spring cleaning at Cloud 9, Amy and Garrett go through unclaimed photos and find a woman that they recognize and try to identify her. Meanwhile, Jonah feels like he should spend more time with Glenn as he begins a relationship with Kristen, but soon gets annoyed when Glenn becomes too clingy. Cheyenne's fiancé Bo starts working at Cloud 9, but Cheyenne becomes suspicious when Bo bonds with Dina. At the end of the episode, Glenn receives a call from Jeff revealing that there are upcoming layoffs for each store in the District. Amy's name tag: Jeanne
32	21	"Cheyenne's Wedding"	Michael Weaver	Story by : Vanessa Ramos; Teleplay by : Bridget Kyle & Vicky Luu	April 27, 2017	2.77
It's Cheyenne and Bo's wedding day and Dina puts them in an uncomfortable situation when she invites herself to be a bridesmaid. Meanwhile, Glenn invites Jeff to the wedding to try to change Jeff's mind about the upcoming layoffs. Mateo attempts to avoid Jeff throughout the wedding. Amy brings Adam to the wedding, and she and Jonah try to dodge relationship rumors when they are called "work husband" and "work wife". Amy projects her marriage struggles in her toast to Cheyenne and Bo, causing her relationship with Adam to deteriorate, and Kristen tells Jonah that she "needs a break" from him. Jeff tells Mateo that he hates him for suddenly breaking up with him. Glenn accidentally announces the news about the layoffs to employees at the wedding. Amy's name tag: Hailey
33	22	"Tornado"	Matt Sohn	Justin Spitzer	May 4, 2017	2.91
Chaos hits Cloud 9 when a tornado warning puts the employees on edge. Glenn is faced with the decision of having to lay off six employees. Jonah tries to play off previously calling Amy "sexy" by overusing the word, even when inappropriate. Garrett becomes upset when Dina claims she wouldn't protect him from the tornado any more than she would a total stranger. Meanwhile, tensions rise between Sandra and Carol after Sandra kissed Carol's boyfriend at Cheyenne's wedding. Glenn announces the laid-off employees just before the storm becomes violent. The employees and customers must take shelter when the tornado hits the store. Amy and Jonah become trapped together in the storm and eventually share a kiss. Once the tornado clears, everyone emerges to find the store completely destroyed. Amy's name tag: Dottie Note: This episode was not shown in the Dallas-Fort Worth area through the network's owned station in that market, KXAS-TV due to the storyline involving a tornado hitting a store.

== Production ==
=== Development ===
The day after the first season finale had aired, Superstore was renewed for a second season on NBC. The second season will contain 13 episodes, but on September 21, 2016, the day before the second season premiere, NBC ordered 9 additional scripts, possibly making the episode-count up to 22 episodes. NBC announced on May 15, 2016, that the show had been moved, and would be airing on Thursdays in the time slot 8 p.m. The show will be leading off NBC's Thursday night primetime programming in the 2016–17 season. It was announced the same day that the second season would begin airing on September 22, 2016. On August 3, 2016, it was announced that Michael Bunin would be playing a recurring role in the second season as Jeff, Cloud 9's district manager. A trailer for the new season was released on September 8, 2016. A promotional poster was released on August 5, 2016. On September 23, 2016, NBC gave the series a full season order of 22 episodes.

=== Olympics-themed episode ===
To promote the second season, NBC announced on May 15, 2016, that it would be airing a special Olympics-themed episode of Superstore during the network's coverage of the 2016 Summer Olympics in Rio de Janeiro. On June 30, 2016, it was announced that the episode would be airing on August 19, 2016, in one of the last days in the Olympics. Executive producer Justin Spitzer revealed in an interview during NBC's TCA Press Tour that the plot in the episode would occur in the middle of the first season, not after the first season finale. The episode included guest appearances from real-life Olympic medalists Tara Lipinski, Apolo Ohno and McKayla Maroney, in addition to Cecily Strong who played the fictional Olympic medalist Missy Jones. The episode received a series high of 9.67 million total viewers, up 34 percent from the previous high of 7.21 million, which was achieved in the series premiere. The special episode also achieved a 3.0 rating in the 18-49 demographic, a full point up from the premiere episode's 2.0.

== Ratings ==
No. in series	No. in season	Episode	Air date	Time slot (EST)	Rating/Share (18–49)	Viewers (m)	Timeslot rank
13	1	"Strike"	September 22, 2016	Thursday; 8:00 p.m.	1.5/6	5.45	3
14	2	"Back to Work"	September 29, 2016	Thursday; 8:00 p.m.	1.3/5	4.39	3
15	3	"Guns, Pills and Birds"	October 6, 2016	Thursday; 8:00 p.m.	1.4/5	5.18	3
16	4	"Spokesman Scandal"	October 13, 2016	Thursday; 8:00 p.m.	1.2/5	4.39	3
17	5	"Dog Adoption Day"	October 20, 2016	Thursday; 8:00 p.m.	1.0/4	4.18	4
18	6	"Halloween Theft"	October 27, 2016	Thursday; 8:00 p.m.	1.3/5	4.21	3
19	7	"Election Day"	November 3, 2016	Thursday; 8:00 p.m.	1.1/4	3.58	3
20	8	"Seasonal Help"	November 10, 2016	Thursday; 8:00 p.m.	1.2/5	4.01	3
21	9	"Black Friday"	November 10, 2016	Thursday; 8:00 p.m.	1.3/4	3.79	2
22	10	"Lost and Found"	January 5, 2017	Thursday; 8:00 p.m.	1.2/4	4.43	2
23	11	"Rebranding"	January 12, 2017	Thursday; 8:00 p.m.	1.2/4	4.33	2
24	12	"Ladies' Lunch"	February 2, 2017	Thursday; 8:00 p.m.	1.2/4	3.99	3
25	13	"Valentine's Day"	February 9, 2017	Thursday; 8:00 p.m.	1.1/4	3.54	4
26	14	"Super Hot Store"	February 16, 2017	Thursday; 8:00 p.m.	1.1/4	3.67	4
27	15	"Wellness Fair"	February 23, 2017	Thursday; 8:00 p.m.	1.1/4	3.51	4
28	16	"Integrity Award"	March 16, 2017	Thursday; 8:00 p.m.	1.1/4	4.17	3
29	17	"Mateo's Last Day"	March 23, 2017	Thursday; 8:00 p.m.	1.1/4	4.15	3
30	18	"Glenn's Kids"	April 6, 2017	Thursday; 8:00 p.m.	0.8/3	3.08	4
31	19	"Spring Cleaning"	April 20, 2017	Thursday; 8:00 p.m.	0.9/4	3.15	3
32	20	"Cheyenne's Wedding"	April 27, 2017	Thursday; 8:30 p.m.	0.8/3	2.77	2
33	21	"Tornado"	May 4, 2017	Thursday; 8:30 p.m.	0.8/3	2.91	4

== Home media ==
The Complete Second Season
Set details	Special features
22 episodes; 3-disc set; 420 minutes; English (Dolby Digital 5.1 Surround)	
Release dates
Region 1	Region 4
July 25, 2017	September 5, 2018
