= Labor Day in Spain =

Annual observance

Labor Day in Spain, known there as Día del Trabajador or Primero de Mayo, was first celebrated on May 1, 1889. The way in which Spaniards celebrate Primero de Mayo has varied greatly since then, due primarily to the Francoist State, which lasted from 1936 to 1975. After 4 decades of being prohibited, in 1978 the celebration was finally re-legalized and re-instated as a national holiday, and since then every Primero de Mayo has been marked by protests and manifestations all over the country, in which social advances are celebrated and workers’ rights are revindicated.

== Development ==
=== Origin ===
The date for Spain's Primero de Mayo has the same origin as International Workers' Day: the Haymarket affair in 1886 Chicago. Workers all over the United States had been asking for an 8-hour work day since April, and threatened a strike to begin on May 1 if employers did not compromise. In Chicago, the strike lasted an extra 3 days, and on May 4 turned into a violent clash between protestors and the police. A bomb that killed several policemen led to the imprisonment of over 30 and assassination of 5 accused civilians, which led to a serious discussion regarding workers’ rights by governments all over the world. Finally, in 1889, May 1 was declared International Workers' Day by the Socialist Workers Congress of the Second International. at a conference held in Paris That same year Spain celebrated its very first Día del Trabajador, which was adopted through two different routes by the Spanish labor movement: socialists throwing a ‘labor party’ in an attempt to support that sector of the population while avoiding violence, and anarchists calling a revolutionary strike.

=== Introduction of Primero de Mayo ===
For the first Día del Trabajador, the socialists were worried that there would not be enough participation on the signaled May 1, and were therefore planning on organizing the manifestation on Sunday, May 4 instead. Their concern turned out to be unnecessary, however, since the working class was already organizing itself for manifestations on May 1, as all had heard about the decision made at the conference held in Paris earlier in the year. The anarchists too were planning on having their protests on May 1, as that had been decided as International Workers' Day.

For Spain's first Primero de Mayo, two different manifestations occurred in Madrid, the socialist and anarchist, taking different routes. The socialists organized thousands of workers, who after a public meeting marched to the Council of Ministers to deliver their revindications, then dissolving into smaller protests. The anarchists also participated in public meetings before marching to deliver their revindications to the president of the Congress of Deputies.

The manifestations in Madrid did not involve any notable conflict, but other places in the country saw violence. Socialists in Basque Country had organized a series of acts for the first few days of May, which caused the layoff of many of the main leaders of the protests. This caused many workers to go on strike, leading to a general strike in the area. With more protests and violence, a state of war was declared in Basque Country and tensions did not start dying down until May 21. The socialists ended up obtaining a shorter work day, but one of their other goals, the suppression of canteens and barracks, would have to wait till next year. Anarchist presence in Valencia, Barcelona, Catalonia, and many others places also caused strikes and violence, causing owners to close factories and attracting Civil Guard intervention, but victory was not as clear here as it was for the socialist party.

Spain's first Día del Trabajador showed undeniable success, as even though specific gains were not seen everywhere, both the government and individual bosses become conscious of the fact that the working class needed attention. The violence brought on by the celebration, however, caused the Spanish government to prohibit public manifestations, which meant that Primero de Mayo in 1890 was much less exciting and mobilizing as it had been the year before. Respecting the law, socialists limited their day to a break from work and private celebration, while the anarchists maintained their one-day strike. The following year, however, it was declared that May 1 would be an international manifestation day, and in order to participate both groups would have to rethink their celebrations. With the intention of participating without breaking the law, the socialists decided to focus on fighting for labor laws and rights in celebrations that did not mention social revolutions, reiterating the importance of pacifism. Faced with the inability to protest and seek a revolution, from then on anarchists loss interest in participating in Primero de Mayo.

=== Official holiday ===
Even though el Día del Trabajador originated in 1889 in Spain, it was not declared an official holiday until 1931 with the beginning of the Second Republic. Largo Caballero, then Spain's Minister of Labor, had proposed that the date be made an official holiday, and within weeks of the Second Republic's proclamation the proposal was accepted. Upon acceptance, an estimated 300,000 people marched in Madrid led by the ‘Republic’ (represented by a girl dressed as such), ending where then president Niceto Alcala-Zamora celebrated ‘the end of social antagonism’. With this declaration, the complaints and requests of the workers from all over the country would go directly to the government, allowing a new ‘wave’ of public power.

=== Franco's Primero de Mayo ===
In the middle of the Spanish Civil War, which lasted from 1936 to 1939, Franco abolished the holiday of Primero de Mayo with a decree on April 12, 1937, which also stated that a new holiday dedicated to “Trabajo Nacional,” or National Labor, would later be declared. In March 1938 the “Fuero del Trabajo,” or Code of Labor, was published, establishing that Spain would now celebrate a “Fiesta de la Exaltacion del Trabajo,” or Labor Praising Party, to be held on July 18, his birthday. Since the Republican zone was in no condition to hold real protests mid-war, for the next several years only small, secret acts (mostly in theaters) were held to celebrate the working class's fight against Franco's army.

After the war ended, the labor organizations that had kept some secret activity during the war began to reconvene and organize new protests to fight for the return of the celebrations of Primero de Mayo. A notable protest was that of 1947 in Biscay, which brought to light the problems faced by the population with high living cost and low salaries due to the war. None of the protests would bring any significant improvements to the working class any time soon, as most of them were shut down by Franco.

Almost 20 years after Franco put an end to Primero de Mayo, the Catholic Church intervened. In 1955, Pope Pius XII decided to designate May 1 as Fiesta de San José Artesano, also known as San José Obrero, and Franco incorporated the holiday into the next year. Beginning in 1956, the manifestations in favor of workers’ rights were replaced by masses in churches all over the country in honor of who would become the patron saint of workers. Starting in 1957, Spain's Union Organization of Education and Rest began organizing a ‘union demonstration,’ a sort of art exhibition where groups of workers would play sports and perform dances for the caudillo in the Chamartín stadium. The objective of this was to promote athletic and artistic activities outside of work and to help keep the workers ‘sane’, but it did not last long.

In the 1960s, the reactivation of the labor movement Comisiones Obreras brought on a new protest ‘tradition’ involving May 1. Instead of large manifestations of the 1st itself, the protest was expressed through extra breaks, boycotts to public transportation, and moments of silence in factories on April 30. Additionally, on May 1 itself, small gatherings in front of the vertical union were held. The Francois State's reaction was first to detain and suspend those caught involved in any act of protest, but after a few years of increased support, the reaction became preventative: anyone with a record of being involved in such demonstrations was detained prior to April 30 and kept until the end of any protests. This lessened participation in such protests over the years, so these too failed to bring improvement to workers.

Outside of Spain, refugees of the war and those exiled by Franco continued to celebrate Primero de Mayo, which allowed them to denounce the Spanish State. A notable major Primero de Mayo organization outside of Spain was in 1954 Marseille, France, organized by the Spanish Socialist Worker's Party in protest of Franco's regimen. It was also common that exiled Spaniards incorporate themselves into labor manifestations where they were, holding their own banners in protests in countries like Mexico and France.

=== Post-Franco ===
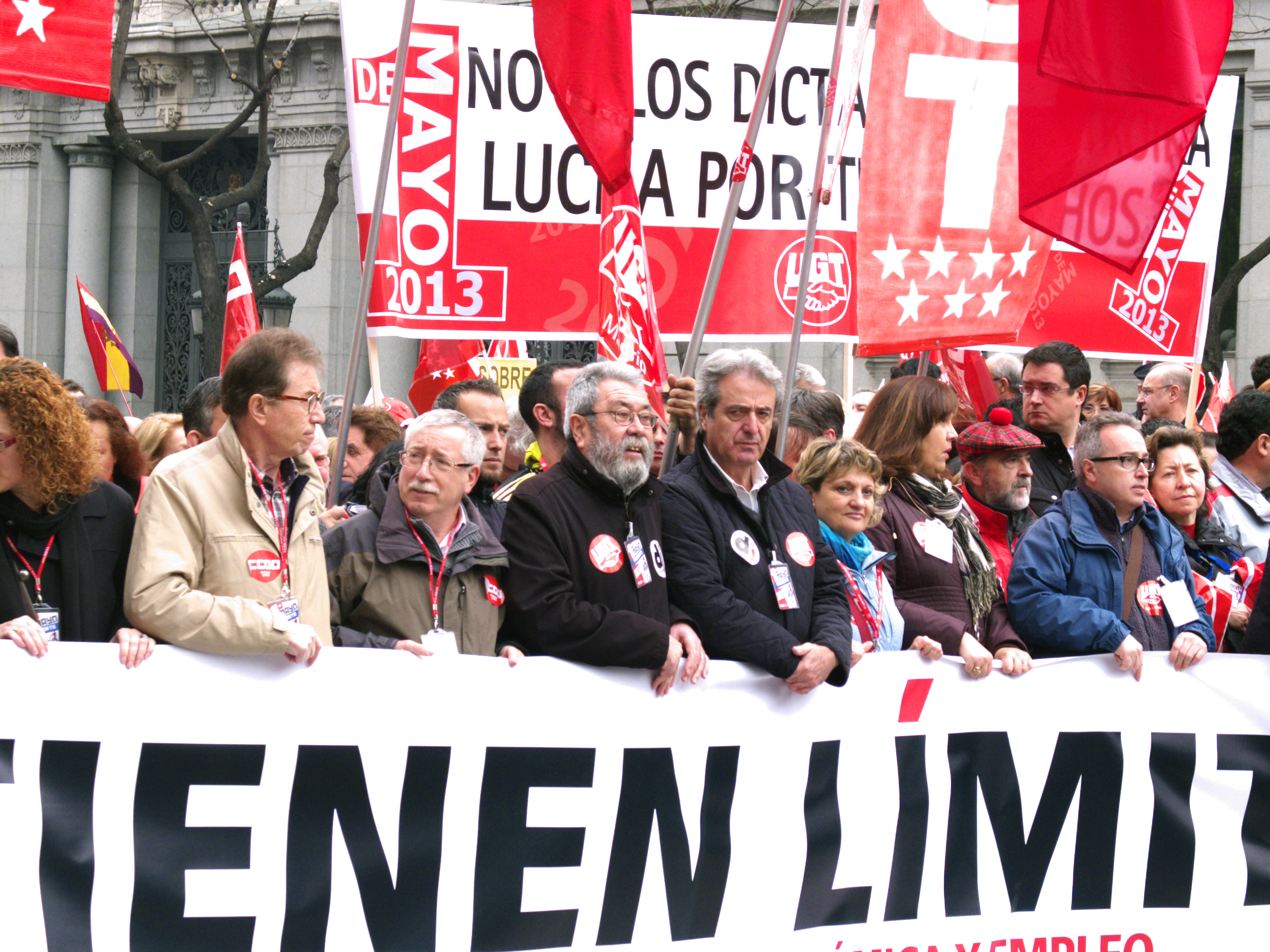
Labor Day in Madrid, 2013; Cándido Méndez (Secretario Gral. de la U.G.T.), Ignacio Fernández Toxo (Secretario Gral. de CC.OO, and others

After the death of Franco in 1975 and the transition to democracy, Primero de Mayo was celebrated a bit more freely, although still not a recognized holiday. Even before officially recognized again, however, the lack of an authoritarian entity continuously repressing the working class's complaints was seen as a large step in the right direction. Primero de Mayo in 1977 marked the beginning of today's Día del Trabajador in Spain, since the major labor unions that had been either stagnant or very slow in their development during Franco's reign were now re-legalized and more active than ever. For the first time in around 4 decades, thousands of members of groups like the Trade Union Confederation of Labor Commissions (CCOO) and the General Union of Workers (UGT) were once again able to protest together on the streets on Madrid, in 1977 specifically protesting for fair wages, stable jobs, and more social protection.

It was not until 1978 that it was re-legalized as a national holiday, and since then every year's Primero de Mayo has worked more and more in favor of the unions who compose the day's manifestations. Since the day has re-claimed its status as a holiday, protesting workers need not occupy their time with mentions of strikes. In recent decades, most unions’ strategies have focused on analyzing their gains and losses in the previous year, organizing meetings and rallies to discuss what rights or assistance they need most for the following year. This allows the protests to be organized, peaceful, and, most importantly, effective, since they have a plan and goal to present to their government and employers.

The holiday's reinstitution by Spain's democracy showed positive results, since the day before 1979's Primero de Mayo the Ministry of Labor announced the creation of approximately 280,000 jobs in the near future. Since then, Primero de Mayo protests have focused on whatever the current needs of the labor division are, much like any other country that celebrates Labor Day. Since it is a national holiday, all schools and most businesses are closed, public transportation runs on a ‘holiday schedule,’ and most commercial centers are closed; restaurants and museums usually stay open, as well as other tourist and entertainment attractions.

== See also ==
- Labor Day in Toledo, Spain
