= Blockbuster (TV series) =

American comedy television series

- Promotional poster
- Genre: Workplace comedy
- Created by: Vanessa Ramos
- Starring: Randall Park; Melissa Fumero; Olga Merediz; Tyler Alvarez; Madeleine Arthur
- Country of origin: United States
- Original language: English
- No. of seasons: 1
- No. of episodes: 10

Production
- Executive producers: John Davis; John Fox; David Caspe; Jackie Clarke; Vanessa Ramos; Randall Park
- Producers: Bridger Winegar; Robert Petrovic; Payman Benz
- Production locations: Vancouver, British Columbia, Canada
- Cinematography: Rick Page
- Camera setup: Single camera
- Running time: 26-28 minutes
- Production companies: Fat Paws; Shark vs. Bear Productions; Davis Entertainment; Universal Television

Original release
- Network: Netflix
- Release: November 3, 2022

Blockbuster is an American workplace comedy television series created by Vanessa Ramos, who also served as showrunner and executive producer. Based upon the Blockbuster brand, the series stars Randall Park as Timmy, the manager in a fictionalized version of the last Blockbuster Video store, set in Grandville, Michigan. The series premiered on Netflix on November 3, 2022 to negative reviews. In December 2022, the series was canceled after one season.

== Cast and characters ==
=== Main ===
- Randall Park as Timmy Yoon, the owner/manager of the last operating Blockbuster Video store on Earth. He is a dreamer and a lover of films.
- Melissa Fumero as Eliza Walker, Timmy's long-time crush and an employee at the store who works to afford her apartment after splitting with her husband
- Olga Merediz as Connie Serrano, an older employee of Blockbuster
- Tyler Alvarez as Carlos Herrera, a young employee at the store who dreams of being a director, much like Quentin Tarantino
- Madeleine Arthur as Hannah Hadman, a young employee of the store who is also Carlos's friend

=== Recurring ===
- J. B. Smoove as Percy Scott, Timmy's best friend and the landlord of the strip-mall in which the store is located
- Kamaia Fairburn as Kayla Scott, Percy's daughter who works at the store
- Leonard Robinson as Aaron Walker, Eliza's husband
- Keegan Connor Tracy as Rene, a potential love interest of Timmy

=== Guest ===
- Ashley Alexander as Mila
- Robyn Bradley as Miranda
- Bobby Moynihan as Stevie, a former child actor

== Episodes ==
No.	Title	Directed by	Written by	Original release date	Prod. code
1	"Pilot"	Payman Benz	Vanessa Ramos	November 3, 2022	101
After receiving notice from his boss that corporate is going under, Timmy Yoon prepares his store as the last Blockbuster store in the world. With the help of Eliza and Percy, Timmy puts together a block party for the strip mall the store is located in. After a balloon explodes via a firework mistake, the store receives online attention when Carlos, a store employee, video tapes the incident. Meanwhile, Percy and Carlos convince Timmy to confess his feelings to Eliza, on whom he has had a crush on since high school.
2	"Blockbuster Daddy"	Payman Benz	Leila Strachan	November 3, 2022	102
Timmy learns that he has to fire someone to keep the store afloat and asks help from Percy. Eliza worries she's not being a good mom after hearing her daughters' new rock album. Carlos tries to set up a special shelf in remembrance of the late local celebrity Hollywood Harold. Timmy and Percy interview the employees to find out the person who doesn't need the job. Timmy decides to fire Hannah but when he struggles with the firing, Kayla, who did not like working at the store, quits. But then Percy secretly tells Timmy that he will pay Kayla's salary so that he can hang out with his daughter more.
3	"Evan and Trevin"	Aleysa Young	Vanessa Ramos & Jackie Clarke	November 3, 2022	103
Halloween brings screams and schemes as Timmy, Eliza, and Percy plot revenge against a pair of teen pranksters. Connie and Kayla launch an investigation. Carlos is upset about Timmy getting a new intern to do the job Carlos did in all the previous years. Timmy's plan to revenge prank the twins backfires as he falls through the skylight. But Eliza saves the day by telling the twin's mother that it was the twins who broke the skylight, getting the twins punished and winning the prank war. Carlos finds out the intern was only being competitive with him as a way to flirt and they kiss but then Carlos finds out that they have an irreconcilable difference. Timmy finds out that Percy is trying to evict him.
4	"The Itsy Bizzies"	Aleysa Young	Bridger Winegar	November 3, 2022	104
A nomination for a small business award has Timmy changing his hair - and a lot more with the help of Connie after finding out that the prize includes $5000. Eliza disagrees and thinks the change is making Timmy lose his real self. Meanwhile, Carlos urges a penny-pinching Hannah to treat herself by convincing her to go to a nail salon. Carlos is disappointed to find out that Hannah picked that shop because she already had a gift certificate and was not planning to spend any real money. Percy finally confesses to Kayla that he is jealous of Timmy getting nominated when he did not. The decorations at the party Timmy organized to woo the judges catch on fire and he gets blacklisted from the competition. But the fire also motivates Hannah to enjoy life a bit more because she realizes that tomorrow is not promised. Carlos confesses to her that he hates the accounting degree he is currently following. Timmy decides to sell his car to pay the rent.
5	"King of Queens"	Katie Locke O'Brien	Rachel Pegram	November 3, 2022	105
When Timmy resolves to move on from his crush and start dating he turns to Percy and Kayla for help. Eliza tries to get her husband to take her to a new French restaurant for date night by dropping not-so-subtle hints. Meanwhile, Carlos is relieved to find out that his ex married herself. Connie and Hannah are trying to figure out what Carlos' type is after he said that he doesn't have a type. Rene asks Timmy out for trivia night and he rebuffs her first. But when he sees that Eliza is going on a date with her husband to the French restaurant, he gets jealous and accepts Rene's invitation. Percy convinces Kayla to message all of Timmy's matches to trivia night to ruin his date but the new ladies bond with Rene. Connie figures out that Carlos' type is self-absorbed people. Timmy finds Eliza at the bar and both realize that their respective dates are going badly.
6	"Parental Control"	Payman Benz	Francisco Cabrera-Feo	November 3, 2022	106
Eliza's tries to get a much-needed night of me-time with a new Korean drama. But before she leaves she suggests Timmy to organize the inventory. All of the staff guilt-trip Eliza to join them working late instead of going home to watch TV. Timmy gets a call from his mother about a family emergency and he leaves early only to find that it was just a petty dispute. Connie is falling asleep by habit and Carlos leaves to study for his exam. Timmy returns, but when his father calls him, he steals Eliza's car keys and goes to see his parents again. Eliza tricks Connie into drinking an energy drink so that she can get her back to doing inventory. Timmy comes back and tells Eliza that he will send everyone home and do inventory by himself.
7	"Intimate Angels"	Katie Locke O'Brien	Brandon James Childs	November 3, 2022	107
Timmy shows the team a movie memorabilia plate he bought from the auction held after the death of Hollywood Harold. Connie comes late to work and everyone mocks her. But they are shocked to find out that Connie was late because her friend Helen died. The team points out to Timmy how much Percy manipulates and uses him. Percy uses the memorabilia plate to heat some foul food in the Blockbuster microwave and Carlos uses this point to finally convince Timmy how badly Percy has been treating him. Eliza, Hannah, and Kayla try to help the grieving Connie find a new friend. Timmy stands up to Percy but he retaliates by cutting water to all other bathrooms but the one in Blockbuster so that all the people at the mall go to the Blockbuster bathroom and disrupt the business. Eliza breaks Connie's weird angel figurine by mistake and when she goes to Patrice to get it fixed, finds out that she too is into it just as much as Connie. Timmy has a rough start with the new arrival Lena but finally manages to ask her out on a date, but seeing them together makes Eliza jealous.
8	"Special Guy Day"	Payman Benz	Jackie Clarke & Tristan Bailey	November 3, 2022	108
Timmy is happy that the finances are finally in the black. But that joy is short-lived as Hannah announces that she cashed the last four of her paychecks that morning. Eliza's day is ruined as Erin, the girl that Aaron cheated with comes to the Blockbuster. Hannah tells Carlos that she is trying to sit for a community college entrance exam but due to her father not filling out some paperwork, she only has one day to study. Timmy is on his way to the bank to deposit some money to prevent Hannah's checks from bouncing when he finds Eliza stress eating and crying. He takes her to a bar instead to cheer her up. Connie and Carlos say that they are going to help Hannah cram for the test. But when Hannah takes the practice test, she fails. The team find out that it was because she is used to a distraction-filled environment rather than a silent one. So the team recreates a noisy environment for her to take the actual test which results in her passing the exam. Meanwhile, Timmy and Eliza are vandalizing a billboard with Aaron's face on it. Timmy sends Eliza home and meets Lena for a date.
9	"Thimble"	Jackie Clarke	Bridger Winegar & Elizabeth Kim	November 3, 2022	109
Ready to move on from Blockbuster, Eliza interviews for a promising new job at a car rental. Timmy tells Connie and Hannah to set up a new interactive display. Timmy doesn't have money to buy snacks to sell so he tries to sell promo snacks. Meanwhile, Kayla is looking for an apartment. But the one she found raises some red flags for Connie and Hannah. Connie is struggling at putting together the display when a customer tries to help her. But she chases him away. Eliza comes back from the interview and tells Timmy that she did not take the job. But this makes him guilty and after consulting two customers, takes off to fix the situation. Connie, Hannah, and Carlos warn Percy about the suspicious apartment Kayla is trying to rent. Timmy finds out that Eliza lied about getting offered the job and that she trash-talked Blockbuster at the interview. Kayla's new apartment turns out to be a scam. But Percy and her bond over talking about the experience. Connie props up the thimble display but when she tries to test it, her thumb gets stuck in it. Timmy promotes Eliza to the assistant manager post but with no pay increment.
10	"Sh*t Storm"	Jackie Clarke	Vanessa Ramos & Mary Nguyen	November 3, 2022	110
The team is decorating the store for the holidays but warnings about an upcoming solar storm worry them. Connie is upset that her new best friend Patrice has not responded to her for two days. Hannah tells Carlos that she convinced Aaron to re-propose to Eliza at the Blockbuster that evening. Stevie, the former actor from an old Christmas movie that Timmy invited draws in a large crowd to everyone's surprise. But while Timmy and Eliza were working up the crowd, Stevie barges onto the stage, very drunk. Timmy and Eliza try to get the DVD signing going but Stevie's foul mouth results in people starting to leave. Carlos finds out that he did not get into film school. The solar storm hits while Timmy walks away dejected. But Lena finally calls him her boyfriend and that lifts his spirits. Meanwhile, Kayla is making a lot of money by selling random essentials to customers who did not stock up before the solar flare. A sudden influx of people is coming to Blockbuster because the Internet is down. Patrice comes to the store accusing Connie of not contacting her. It turns out neither of them can remember who called whom last. But they both agree that they value each other's friendship. Meanwhile, Hannah tries to trick Eliza to get into the breakroom so the proposal could happen. But she doesn't need convincing as she is upset about having to see Lena and Timmy together. Aaron proposes to Eliza but seeing Timmy, she rejects it. Timmy then mistakenly calls Lena Eliza and she cancels their date. A misunderstanding between Stevie and Percy starts a riot and people start looting the Blockbuster store. Timmy tells Eliza he has had enough of trying to make the store work. Meanwhile, Hannah watches the video of Aaron's failed proposal and finds out that Eliza has feelings for Timmy.

== Production ==
=== Development ===
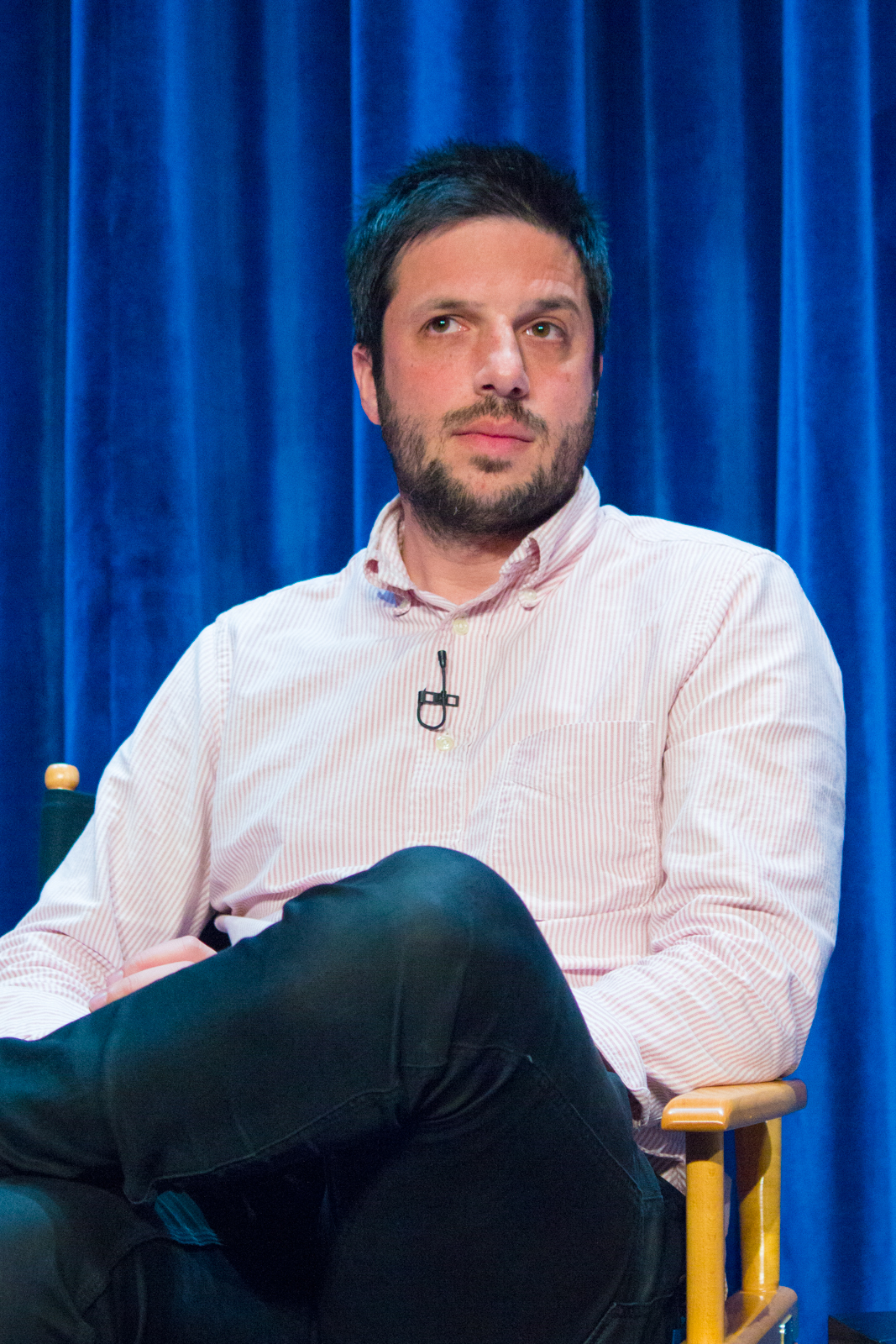
David Caspe serves as writer and executive producer.

Originally, the series was pitched to executives at NBC; however, they were not interested in green-lighting the series. Universal Television began shopping the series to other networks eventually gaining approval from Netflix; Randall Park was then cast in the lead role. Netflix had previously acquired streaming rights to 1091 Pictures' 2020 documentary film The Last Blockbuster.

Netflix officially announced the series on November 17, 2021. The series is created by Vanessa Ramos who previously worked on shows such as Superstore and Brooklyn Nine-Nine. Along with the series announcement it was confirmed that the series would be produced by Davis Entertainment and Universal Television. It was also announced that David Caspe and Jackie Clarke would be serving as writers on the series, and John Davis would serve as an executive producer under Davis Entertainment. Clarke, Caspe, John Fox and Ramos will serve as executive producers with Bridger Winegar and Robert Petrovic serving as co-executive producers. In February 2022, Deadline Hollywood reported that Payman Benz would be directing four episodes of the series including the pilot. Benz will also serve as an executive producer for those four episodes. In addition, Aleysa Young and Katie Locke O'Brien would serve as directors in the first season in addition to Benz. Rick Page serves as cinematographer for the series.

A first look at the series was released on May 5, 2022 during the Netflix Is A Joke festival, the first look included a look at the style of the series as well as a promo featuring Fumero and Park's characters. The series released on November 3, 2022. On December 16, 2022, Netflix canceled the series after one season.

=== Casting ===
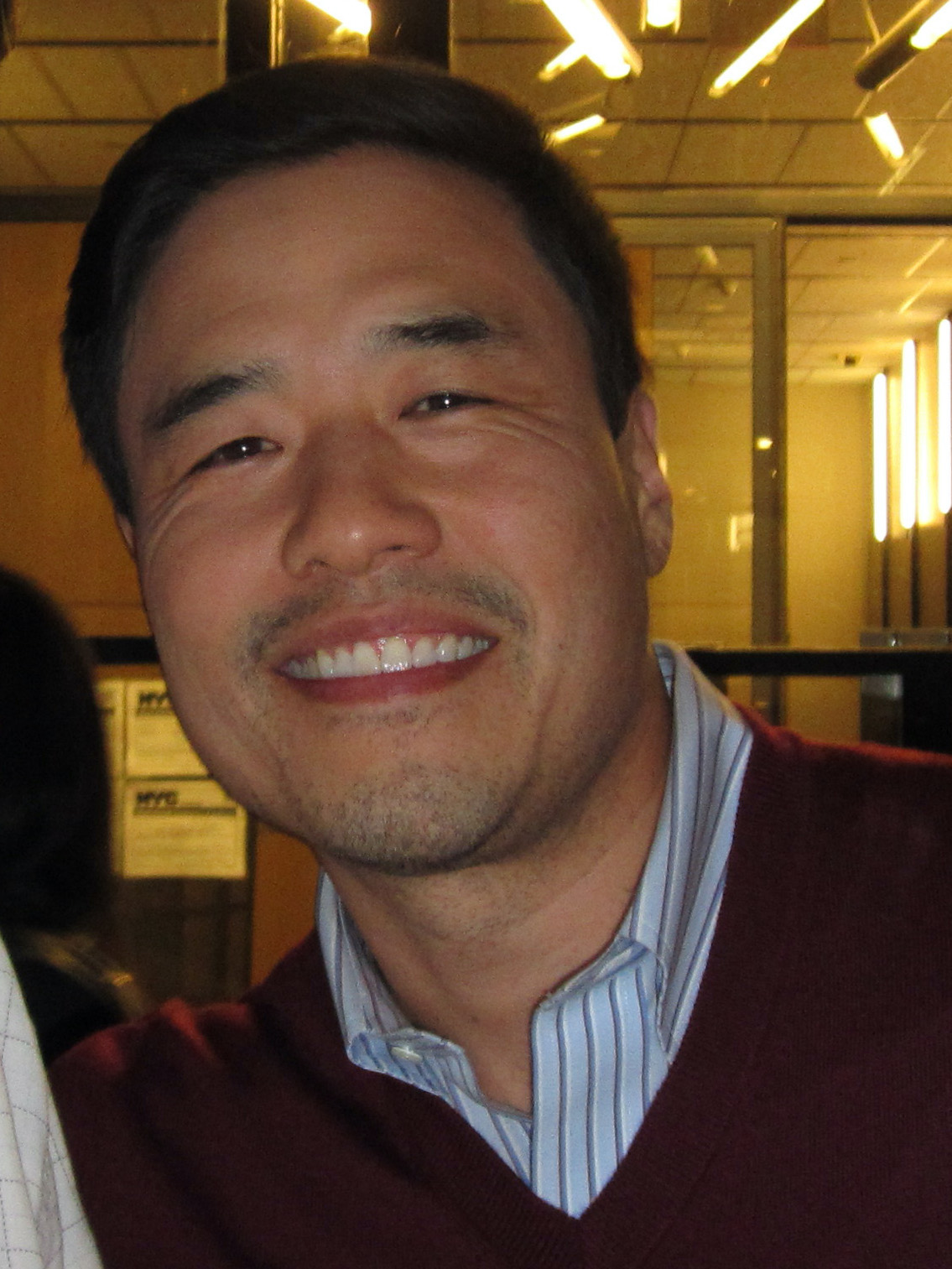
Randall Park (Timmy)

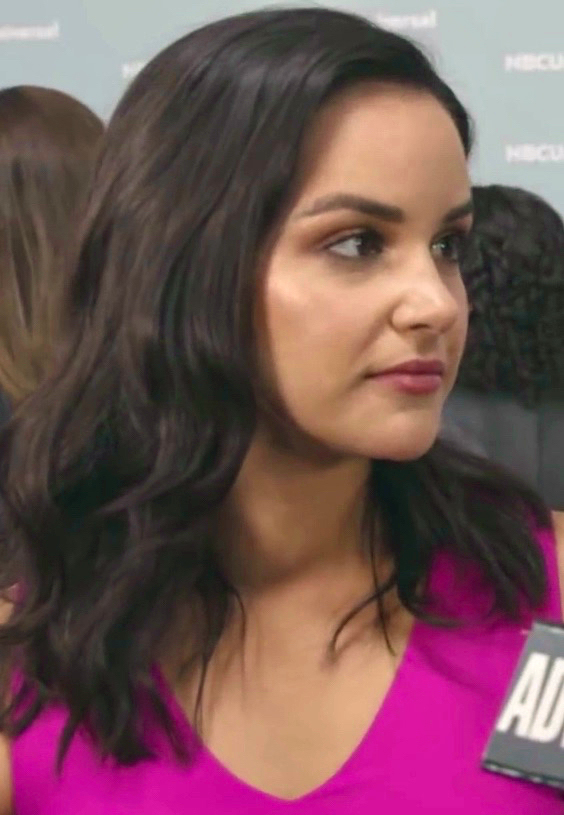
Melissa Fumero (Eliza)

With the announcement of the series in November 2021, Randall Park joined the cast as a character named Timmy, who is described as a dreamer and a lover of movies, per Deadline Hollywood. In February 2022, Melissa Fumero was cast as a character named Eliza who is described as a mother whose marriage to her high school sweetheart is on thin ice, per Hollywood Reporter. In March 2022, Tyler Alvarez, Madeleine Arthur, and Olga Merediz were announced as series regulars playing Carlos, Hannah and Connie, respectively. Additionally, J. B. Smoove was cast as Timmy's best friend Percy and Kamaia Fairburn was cast as Percy's daughter, with both appearing as recurring guest stars. In May 2022, it was reported that Ashley Alexander and Robyn Bradley will appear in guest-starring roles as Mila and Miranda, respectively.

=== Filming ===
Production on the first season began on February 28, 2022. Filming began taking place in Vancouver, Canada, in April 2022, with filming expected to conclude on May 2. However, Fumero confirmed that the series had "almost" wrapped production on May 2 with an Instagram story. Filming for the first season concluded on May 4, 2022.

== Release ==
The sole season of Blockbuster was released onto Netflix on November 3, 2022, and consisted of 10 episodes. A trailer was released on October 7, 2022.

== Reception ==
On the review aggregator website Rotten Tomatoes, 23% of 48 critics' reviews are positive, with an average rating of 4.6/10. The website's consensus reads: "Blockbuster tries to leverage nostalgia for the defunct brand, but this contrived workplace comedy is fatally unfunny -- be kind, rewind, and chuck it into the return bin." Metacritic, which uses a weighted average, assigned a score of 45 out of 100, based on 23 critics, indicating "mixed or average reviews". Out of 9.5k ratings, IMDb viewers give a weighted average of 5.1/10, noting it to be "boring", "unfunny", and very remiscent of Superstore, a previous workplace sitcom by Vanessa Ramos.
