= Labor, Koper =

Labor Laura
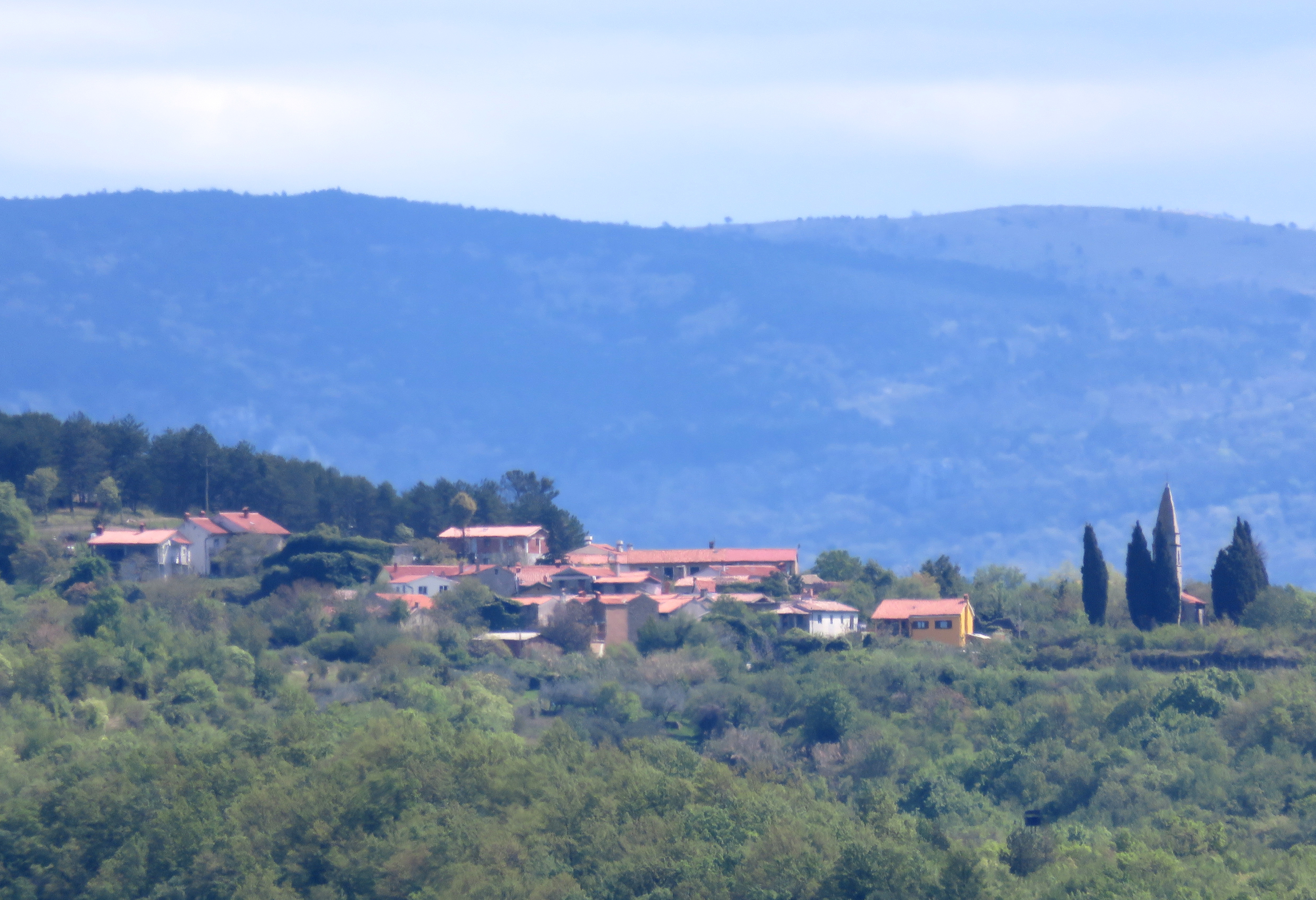

- Location in Slovenia
- Coordinates: 45°28′33.38″N 13°46′21.34″E
- Country: Slovenia
- Traditional region: Littoral
- Statistical region: Coastal–Karst
- Municipality: Koper

Area
  - Total: 4.48 km^{2} (1.73 sq mi)
- Elevation: 328.7 m (1,078 ft)

Population (2002)
  - Total: 36

Labor (pronounced [ˈlaːbɔɾ]; Italian: Laura) is a small village in the City Municipality of Koper in the Littoral region of Slovenia on the border with Croatia.

The local church is dedicated to Saint Martin and belongs to the Parish of Truške.
