= Lev Bondarev =

Soviet and Russian geographer (1932–2005)

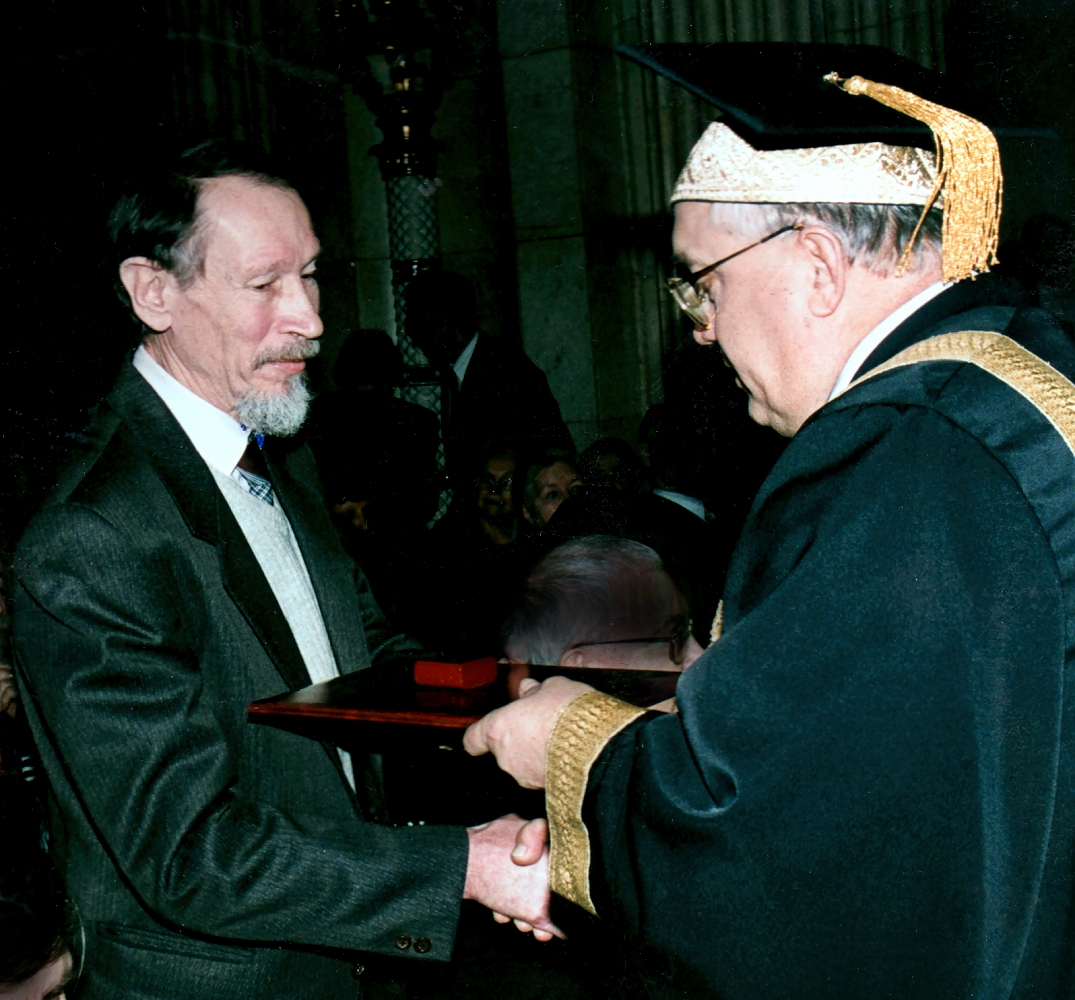
- MSU, 2000
- Born: 12 August 1932 (age 94); Smolensk, Russian SFSR, Soviet Union
- Died: November 5, 2005 (aged 73); Moscow, Russia
- Education: Moscow State University
- Known for: Geomorphology and Glaciology works
- Scientific career
- Fields: Geography
- Workplaces: Moscow State University

Lev Georgievich Bondarev (Russian: Лев Георгиевич Бондарев; 12 August 1932 – 5 November 2005) was a Soviet and Russian geographer, and docent at the Geographical Faculty of the Moscow State University. He was a specialist in Quaternary geology, geomorphology, paleogeography, and geoecology. His research covered a wide range of scientific topics, from the paleogeography of the Pleistocene and glaciology to the problem of the impact of human industrial activity on nature. He participated in numerous expeditions to the mountain regions of Central Asia. He was the author of more than 200 scientific articles and 15 monographs.

He defended the viewpoint about the existence of a higher historical water level and an outflow from Issyk-Kul lake, which differed from the views of I. P. Gerasimov and E. Ya. Rantsman. He was the first to conduct absolute dating using radiocarbon and geochemical methods for the Northern Tien Shan.

== Biography ==
L. G. Bondarev was born on 12 August 1932 in the city of Smolensk into a family of white-collar workers. He received a home education. From an early age, he was accustomed to books and his natural curiosity was encouraged.

During the Great Patriotic War, Lev Bondarev was evacuated to the Siberian city of Kansk. He received his primary education at Kansk Secondary School No. 2.

In 1949, the family returned from evacuation to Smolensk, where Bondarev graduated in 1950 from Secondary School No. 7 with a Gold Medal.

Before the revolution, the building of this school housed the Smolensk Men's Classical Gymnasium, which N. M. Przhevalsky had graduated from with honors. Lev Bondarev's school reference stated:

During his time at school, he proved himself to be an extremely gifted pupil, distinguished by perseverance in his work, diligent, disciplined, and cultured. He received top grades in all subjects. He was the best agitator in his class and a member of the class wall newspaper editorial board.

In 1950, following relatives' advice, he enrolled in the Chemistry Department of Moscow State University, but studied there for only one year. Without consulting anyone, he withdrew his documents from the Chemistry Department and enrolled in the Geographical Faculty of Moscow State University in 1951.

In 1952, he completed the first *general course* of study and summer field practice in Krasnovidovo, Mozhaysky District, and took part in an expedition to the Angara River, where he consciously chose his scientific specialty – geomorphology. As a student, in addition to mandatory practices and expeditions, Bondarev traveled extensively across the country: Moscow Oblast, Tula, Leningrad, Kyiv, Dombay, and other places. To make time for these trips, he successfully took exams ahead of schedule, thereby extending his vacation time.

In 1956, he graduated from Moscow State University with honors. He had a good command of English and German, independently mastered Polish, and practiced Kyrgyz.

On 17 April 1964, he defended his candidate's dissertation (Candidate of Geographical Sciences), approved by the Higher Attestation Commission in November 1964.

In 1978 he graduated from the evening University of Marxism-Leninism.

He held a rank in chess and loved backgammon. He studied yoga and was a proponent of hardening and vegetarianism.

== Scientific activity ==
Bondarev's scientific activity began in the mountains of the Tian Shan and at Issyk-Kul lake.

In 1955, he arrived for his pre-diploma field practice at the Tian Shan Physical Geography Station, where he was assigned to the geomorphological squad. The practice supervisor was the station director R. D. Zabirov and the scientific consultant was I. S. Shchukin of the Geomorphology Department. In his diploma work, Some Questions of the Relief History of the Issyk-Kul Basin, he first proposed the idea of the existence of four lake terraces of Issyk-Kul and substantiated the time of their formation. I. S. Shchukin highly appreciated the diploma work.

From 1956 to 1970, by assignment, he worked at the Tian Shan Physical Geography Station of the Academy of Sciences of the Kirghiz SSR and continued research on the Issyk-Kul basin as a junior research fellow. In his first scientific article, Once Again on the Paleogeographical Riddle of Issyk-Kul, he substantiated the lacustrine origin of the coastal terraces and a higher stand of the lake level in the past.

During the International Geophysical Year (IGY, 1957–1959), field research in the Issyk-Kul basin was interrupted. In 1960, it resumed, and Lev Georgievich headed the coastal squad.

From 1962 to 1965, he actively participated in joint work of the Tian Shan Physical Geography Station and the Geographical Faculty, under the leadership of Academician K. K. Markov on the topic: Stratigraphy and Paleogeography of the Issyk-Kul Basin in the Pleistocene.

For over 10 years, Bondarev devoted himself to glaciology, publishing three monographs, two catalogs of glaciers of Kyrgyzstan, and about 50 scientific and popular science articles based on the research materials. The monograph The Influence of Tectonics on the Evolution of Glaciers and the Formation of Glacial Relief was nominated for the D. N. Anuchin Prize in April 1978 and received many positive reviews.

He paid special attention to the issues of interaction between glaciers and tectonics, the influence of tectonics on the evolution of glaciers and the formation of glacial relief on a planetary scale. According to Academician K. K. Markov:

L. G. Bondarev's publications on these issues essentially substantiate and develop a new direction in geography at the intersection of neotectonics, glaciology, and glacial geomorphology, and the formulation and development of the problem on such a scale has been done for the first time not only in domestic but also in world literature.

A novel aspect of Bondarev's works is the idea of a Holocene glacial maximum, which arose from the analysis of field materials from the Tien Shan and was confirmed by data from Asia Minor, Mexico, and the Himalayas. With a team of Soviet geographers on a ship, he visited the countries: Guinea, Senegal, Morocco, Spain, Italy, Algeria, Malta, and Turkey.

From 1971, he worked at the Geographical Faculty of Moscow State University. As a geographer with broad interests, he was interested and concerned with questions of the influence of human activity on the environment and the migration of elements in nature. Issues of environmental pollution were considered by Bondarev to varying degrees in a number of monographs – "Landscapes, Metals and Man" (1976), "Microelements – Good and Evil" (1984) – and in scientific articles: "The Metal Press on the Biosphere" (1976), "Planet of Winds" (1977), "Will the Iron Age End?" (1979), "The Role of Vegetation in the Migration of Mineral Substances into the Atmosphere" (1981), "Microelements Around Us" (1982), and others.

He participated in the development of planned research themes "History of Lakes of the USSR in the Pleistocene. Geomorphology and Paleogeography of Lake Basins", "Main Issues of Physical Geography", "The Natural Environment of the Pleistocene and Its Change through Interaction with Humans", "Change of the Natural Geochemical Background of the Human Environment under the Influence of Technogenic Activity". In his later years, he conducted research on the fundamental theme "Interaction of Humans and the Environment", with the priority direction being the development of issues of technogenesis and the technosphere.

== Teaching work at Moscow State University ==
In 1971, upon the invitation of Academician K. K. Markov, Bondarev began his teaching and research work at the Geographical Faculty of Moscow State University, in the departments of General Physical Geography and Paleogeography and Environmental Management. At Moscow State University, Bondarev developed new lecture courses for students of the Geographical Faculty and wrote textbooks for them

- Paleoecology and Historical Ecology
- History of Environmental Management
- The Influence of Human Society on the Natural Environment

== Popularization of science ==
In 1988, Bondarev, together with Rudolf Balandin, published the book "Nature and Civilization", which was awarded a 2nd-degree diploma at the All-Union Competition for the Best Work of Popular Science Literature. The authors demonstrated the great importance of the geographical approach in studying changes in the planet's landscapes, as well as for understanding the reasons for the rise and fall of civilizations. Understanding the present and foreseeing the future are determined by knowledge of the past. Therefore, assessing the impact of the modern scientific and technical civilization on the geographical environment is only possible by understanding the general patterns of interaction between humans and nature and the results of the economic activities of previous generations.

Bondarev, through his works, revealed to his contemporaries the forgotten names of outstanding Russian figures:

- Danilo Samoilovich (1744–1805) – a doctor, participant in the Russo-Turkish war, who stopped the plague in Moscow in 1771.
- L. I. Mechnikov (1838–1888) – a geographer, sociologist, and publicist.
- N. N. Shelonsky – a science fiction writer, historian, and popularizer, who published the fantastic novel "In the World of the Future" in 1892.

== Awards and decorations ==
- 1970 – Medal "For Valiant Labor in Commemoration of the 100th Anniversary of the Birth of V. I. Lenin".
- 1988 – Medal "Veteran of Labour". 2nd-degree diploma at the All-Union Competition for the Best Work of Popular Science Literature.
- 2000 – Awarded the honorary title "Honored Teacher of Moscow University" by the Academic Council of Moscow State University.
- 2005 – Jubilee badge "250 Years of Moscow State University named after M. V. Lomonosov".

== Selected publications ==
- Bondarev, L.G. (1963). Essays on the Glaciation of the Ak-Shiyrak Massif (in Russian). Frunze: Publishing House of the Academy of Sciences of the Kirghiz SSR. p. 202.
- Bondarev, L.G.; Orozgozhoyev, B.O. Basins of the Right Tributaries of the Sary-Djaz River between the Mouths of the Ak-Shiyrak and Kuilyu Rivers: Including the Kuilyu River Basin. Resources of Surface Waters of the USSR: Catalog of Glaciers of the USSR. Vol. 14: Central Asia. Iss. 2: Kirghizia; Part 7. (in Russian). Leningrad: Gidrometeoizdat. p. 58.
- Bondarev, L.G. (1970). The Ak-Shiyrak River Basin. Resources of Surface Waters of the USSR: Catalog of Glaciers of the USSR. Vol. 14: Central Asia. Iss. 2: Kirghizia; Part 6. (in Russian). Leningrad: Gidrometeoizdat. p. 54.
- Aleshinskaya, Z.V.; Bondarev, L.G.; Voskresenskaya, T.N.; Leflat, O.N. (1971). K.K. Markov (ed.). Section of the Newest Deposits of the Issyk-Kul Depression (in Russian). Moscow: Moscow University Press. p. 163.
- Bondarev, L.G. (1974). Perpetual Motion: Planetary Movement of Matter and Man (in Russian). Moscow: Mysl. p. 160.
- Bondarev, L.G. (1975). K.K. Markov (ed.). Glaciers and Tectonics (in Russian). Leningrad: Nauka. p. 131.; review: Nikonov A.A. Kniga o vzaimodeystvii tektonicheskikh i lednikovykh yavleny. Geomorfologiya. 1976 issue 3 pages 108–109.
- Bondarev, L.G. (1976). R.D. Zabirov (ed.). The Influence of Tectonics on the Evolution of Glaciers and the Formation of Glacial Relief (in Russian). Frunze: Ilim. p. 136.
- Bondarev, L.G. (1976). Landscapes, Metals and Man (in Russian). Moscow: Mysl. p. 72.
- Bondarev, L.G. (1979). Land Reclaimed from the Sea (in Russian). Moscow: Mysl. p. 88.
- Bondarev, L.G. (1984). Microelements – Good and Evil. Science and Progress (in Russian). Moscow: Znanie. p. 144.
  - 2nd ed. M: YOYO Media, 2012. 146 p.; In Polish: Microelementy dobro i zlo. Warszawa: Not Sigma, 1991. 140 p.
- Balandin, R.K.; Bondarev, L.G. (1988). Nature and Civilization. World of Geography (in Russian). Moscow: Mysl. p. 392. ISBN 5-244-00182-5.
- Bondarev L.G. Paleoecology and Historical Ecology (Textbook) |location=Moscow |publisher=Moscow University Press |year=1998 |pages=108 |language=ru}}
- Bondarev, L.G. (1999). History of Environmental Management (Textbook) (in Russian). Moscow: Moscow University Press. p. 96.
- Bondarev, L.G.; Gorbunova, I.A.; Seversky, E.V. (2000). Aldar Petrovich Gorbunov. Series: Scientist-Permafrost Scholars (in Russian). Yakutsk: Institute of Permafrost Studies, Siberian Branch of the Russian Academy of Sciences. p. 49.

== Literature ==
- Isaev D.I. Voprosy istorii estestvoznaniya i tekhniki v Kirgizii. Frunze: Ilim, 1967 pages 15–17 (Istoriya geomorfologicheskikh issledovany Kirgizii (In Russian)
- Polchasa s L.G. Bondarevym // Nemnogo o mnogom. 1999. M: Geograficheskiy fakul'tet MGU. S. 75–77. [Half an hour with L.G. Bondarev]
- Konyukhov F.F., Konyukhova M.E. Vse ptitsy, vse krylaty. Moscow: Yauza Olma-Press, 2001. 232 p. (In Russian) [Recollection of a meeting with L.G. Bondarev]
- Pamyati L'va Georgiyevicha Bondareva // Materially glyatsiologicheskikh issledovany. Vyp. 100. M.: Institut geografii RAN, 2006. P. 184. [In memory of Lev Georgievich Bondarev]
- Kapitsa A.P. Lev Georgiyevich Bondarev: K 75-letiyu so dnya rozhdeniya // Vestnik MGU. Ser 5. Geografiya. 2007. N 4. P. 80–81 (In Russian) [Lev Georgievich Bondarev (on his 75th birthday)]
- Pamyati L'va Georgiyevicha Bondareva // Izvestiya NAN Kyrgyzskoy Respubliki, 2007, No. 3. Bishkek: Ilim. S. 123–124. [In memory of Lev Georgievich Bondarev]
- Vtorov I.P., Bakov E.K., Korotayev V.N. Glyatsiologicheskiye issledovaniya na Tyan-Shanskoy fiziko-geograficheskoy stantsii i vklad v ikh razvitiye R.D. Zabirova // Voprosy istorii estestvoznaniya i tekhniki. 2020 volume 41, issue 1, pages 143–153 https://vietmag.org/s020596060008430-5-1/ [Glaciological research at the Tien Shan Physical Geography Station and R.D. Zabirov's contribution to its development]
