= The Prince's May Day Network =

The Prince's Mayday Network is a group of businesses committed to taking action on climate change and was founded by Charles III in 2007. The Network is convened by Business in the Community and over 3500 businesses have signed up to date. The 'May Day' name is derived from the May Day distress signal, and was chosen deliberately to communicate the urgency of the climate change message

== The Prince's Mayday Summit ==
=== 2007 Summit ===
The first Prince's Mayday Summit on climate change took place on 1 May 2007. It was held as a call to action on the urgent issue of climate change. Over 1,000 business leaders made over 5,500 pledges to take action on climate change at the event.

The Summit networked one hub event at St. James's Palace and nine regional events across England through video conferencing technology. Companies discussed the science behind climate change and the business imperative of taking action on the issue, with contributions from the Prince of Wales, Jonathon Porritt and Crispin Tickell.

This initial event was followed by 2 further summits in Scotland and Wales in November 2007.

=== 2008 Summit ===
The second Prince's Mayday Summit was held on 1 May 2008. Over 1,600 business leaders attended the Summit at 12 locations across the UK which were linked by satellite to a 'hub' event attended by 160 Chief Executives of leading businesses. Attendees were asked to commit to up to 6 pledges on climate change. Nearly 7,000 pledges were made on the day and:

- 76% of attendees committed to calculate their carbon footprint over the next 12 months
- 60% of attendees committed to report their carbon footprint over the next 12 months

=== 2009 Summit ===
The third Prince's Mayday Summit attracted over 1700 delegates, with another 300 watching it live online and included contributions from Pen Hadow, Ed Miliband, John Ashton and Stuart Rose.

== Mayday Journey ==
Since 2009, the focus of Mayday has moved away from annual events to being what it terms an everyday organisation. A major part of this is the Mayday Journey. The Mayday Journey is an online resource that combines a carbon calculator with guidance designed to help companies develop a carbon strategy. The Journey is divided into four areas: reducing cost, engaging employees, suppliers and customers, building resilience through biodiversity and adaptation and developing a vision, termed transform.

=== Mayday case studies ===
Businesses in the Prince's May Day Network are encouraged to take action on climate change by sharing best practice through publishing case studies of best practice. Over 150 companies have provided case studies, including Adnams Brewery, BT Group and Unipart.

=== Mayday report-back ===
Every year, the Prince of Wales requests that every business in the Prince's May Day Network report-back on the progress they have made against their May Day pledges in the May Day report-back. Over 300 businesses reported back in 2011, which formed the basis for an annual report of members activity.
