= Superstore season 1 =

Season of television series

Superstore
- Season 1
- DVD cover
- Starring: America Ferrera; Ben Feldman; Lauren Ash; Colton Dunn; Nico Santos; Nichole Bloom; Mark McKinney
- No. of episodes: 11

Release
- Original network: NBC
- Original release: November 30, 2015 – February 22, 2016

Season chronology
- Next → Season 2

The first season of Superstore, the American television series, was ordered on January 14, 2015. The series was picked up by NBC on May 7, 2015. It debuted on November 30, 2015, with a two-episode premiere. The series was created by Justin Spitzer, who also serves as an executive producer. The season ended on February 22, 2016. The first season originally had an episode order of 13 episodes, but it was later trimmed by NBC to 11 episodes due to scheduling, and The Voice returning to schedule.

== Synopsis ==
Superstore follows a group of employees working at Cloud 9, a fictional big-box store in St. Louis, Missouri. The ensemble and supporting cast features America Ferrera, Ben Feldman, Lauren Ash, Colton Dunn, Nico Santos, Nichole Bloom and Mark McKinney.

== Cast ==
=== Main cast ===
- America Ferrera as Amy Dubanowski
- Ben Feldman as Jonah Simms
- Lauren Ash as Dina Fox
- Colton Dunn as Garrett McNeil
- Nico Santos as Mateo Fernando Aquino Liwanag
- Nichole Bloom as Cheyenne Tyler Lee
- Mark McKinney as Glenn Sturgis

=== Recurring cast ===
- Johnny Pemberton as Bo Derek Thompson
- Josh Lawson as Tate

=== Co-starring cast ===
- Kaliko Kauahi as Sandra
- Linda Porter as Myrtle
- Sean Whalen as Sal

=== Guest cast ===
- Eliza Coupe as Cynthia
- Isabelle Day as Emma Dubanowski
- Ryan Gaul as Adam Dubanowski
- Jon Barinholtz as Marcus
- Dan Bucatinsky as Steve

== Episodes ==
| No. overall | No. in season | Title | Directed by | Written by | Original release date | U.S. viewers (millions) |
|---|---|---|---|---|---|---|
| 1 | 1 | "Pilot" | Ruben Fleischer | Justin Spitzer | November 30, 2015 | 7.21 |
The new Cloud 9 superstore employee Jonah makes a terrible impression to ten-year expert floor supervisor Amy when he knocks a display over, reprices expensive electronics to 25 cents, and rides shopping carts through the parking lot. Meanwhile, assistant store manager Dina develops a crush on Jonah, and the pregnant Cheyenne gets proposed to by her boyfriend Bo in front of the whole store. Amy's name tag: Ramona
| 2 | 2 | "Magazine Profile" | Michael Patrick Jann | Matt Hubbard | November 30, 2015 | 5.35 |
A reporter named Cynthia (Eliza Coupe) comes to Cloud 9 to do an article on that store location for the intra-company magazine. Glenn makes an awkward impression, and later Cynthia seems to be more interested in Jonah and the two start to make out. Dina catches the two on a store security camera and, angered and heartbroken, forces the employees to attend a meeting on inappropriate sexual contact in the workplace. Meanwhile, Cheyenne and her fiancé come up with a jingle for the store, and Garrett tries to avoid being photographed for the article. Amy's name tag: Diana
| 3 | 3 | "Shots and Salsa" | Ruben Fleischer | Justin Spitzer | November 30, 2015 (Online); December 28, 2015 (NBC) | 2.62 |
Glenn asks Amy and Mateo to work the salsa sample booth, and when they refuse, he asks Carmen, the only other employee of Hispanic descent, which angers Amy. Meanwhile, Jonah is tasked with giving out flu shots in the pharmacy, and allows an old white woman to go to the front of the line. This leads to all the employees having to watch a racial sensitivity video, but Jonah insists he helped the woman because she was old, not because she was white. Amy's name tag: Beatrice
| 4 | 4 | "Mannequin" | Victor Nelli Jr. | Jonathan Green & Gabe Miller | January 4, 2016 | 6.04 |
Amy and Garrett make fun of Jonah when they find a mannequin that looks like him, as Jonah struggles to fit in with the rest of the employees. Cheyenne considers putting her baby up for adoption, causing Glenn and Dina to argue over who would be a better adoptive parent. Meanwhile, Amy delegates the shift chart to Mateo as she is busy pranking Jonah, and Mateo uses the newly acquired power to get revenge on employees who have crossed him. Amy's name tag: Sheila
| 5 | 5 | "Shoplifter" | Ruben Fleischer | Jackie Clarke | January 11, 2016 | 5.38 |
Amy dodges store rules by taking her daughter Emma to work, and asks Jonah for help hiding her. Dina tracks down a shoplifter (Natasha Leggero) with help from Amy. The security video ultimately shows the shoplifter is innocent, putting Dina's job in jeopardy, but Glenn plants a DVD in the "shoplifter's" purse to set off the exit alarm and both parties agree to forget the whole thing. Meanwhile, Cheyenne and Mateo fight over a fancy couch that became half price because an elderly customer died on it. Amy's name tag: Allison
| 6 | 6 | "Secret Shopper" | Alex Hardcastle | Lon Zimmet | January 18, 2016 | 5.66 |
Amy is upset and becomes competitive with Jonah after he gets a perfect score on a company policies test. At the same time, the Cloud 9 employees are scrambling to seek out a secret shopper sent by the Chicago corporate office, leading to chaos and confusion. Mateo and Glenn suspect that the corporate "plant" may be posing as an employee, and they believe it's Jonah because his car is too nice for an associate to have and also has Illinois license plates. Amy reveals her reaction to Jonah's perfect score was caused by fear, because she has just enrolled in college classes. Jonah then reveals a secret of his own. Amy's name tag: Sylvia
| 7 | 7 | "Color Wars" | Andy Ackerman | Jack Kukoda | January 25, 2016 | 4.93 |
Cloud 9's annual "Color Wars" contest pits two halves of the store against each other as the red team and the gold team in a sales battle. Glenn's promise of a pizza party for the winning side does little to interest the staff, until cash-strapped Amy discovers each member of the winning team will also get a $100 bonus. Her attempt to hide this fact from the opposing team proves ineffective. Jonah succeeds in making a big sale worth over $2,000, not realizing the customer is Amy's husband, Adam. Meanwhile, Dina mourns the loss of her pet bird. Amy's name tag: Esmé
| 8 | 8 | "Wedding Day Sale" | Victor Nelli Jr. | Sierra Teller Ornelas | February 1, 2016 | 4.89 |
Cloud 9 holds their annual Wedding Day Sale and Cheyenne and Bo shop for their upcoming wedding, but Amy warns them how hard it'll be to raise their child, which prompts Bo to flee. Amy and Dina go on a road trip to find Bo and retrieve a price scanner he took with him, and the two end up bonding when Dina says being in the store during the Wedding Day sale depresses her. Meanwhile, Jonah and Garrett fight over what Cheyenne should buy for her wedding. Also, Glenn tries to prove his tolerance by helping Mateo prepare an area of the bridal department that appeals to same sex couples. Amy's name tag: Roxy
| 9 | 9 | "All-Nighter" | Christine Gernon | Eric Ledgin | February 8, 2016 | 5.19 |
A late night of hanging signs becomes an all-nighter when the doors are locked and the lights are turned off via corporate computers, causing the trapped Cloud 9 employees to come out of their shells. Amy gets drunk and complains about not going to college when she was younger, Glenn rebels against his regional bosses and talks about being the black sheep of his family, Cheyenne demonstrates her dancing skills, and Dina lures Jonah to the photo dark room to seduce him. Trying to let her down easy, Jonah says he feels uncomfortable making out with his supervisor. The episode ends in a cliffhanger when Dina asks Glenn for a demotion the next morning. Amy's name tag: Elana
| 10 | 10 | "Demotion" | Linda Mendoza | Matt Hubbard & Lon Zimmet | February 15, 2016 | 3.89 |
Amy helps Glenn search for a new assistant manager after Dina steps down to pursue Jonah. Amy does not want the job because it is more work and she has her school commitments. Jonah seeks help from Garrett about breaking the news to Dina that he is not interested in dating her. Garrett also helps Mateo prepare an over-the-top presentation for the assistant manager position. Meanwhile, Dina adjusts to her new position as associate by working with Cheyenne in cosmetics. In the end, Amy accepts the assistant manager job after exhausting all the candidates, and is happy to learn the position provides tuition assistance. Amy's name tag: Molly
| 11 | 11 | "Labor" | Beth McCarthy-Miller | Owen Ellickson | February 22, 2016 | 4.68 |
Cheyenne goes into labor while working and it is revealed that Cloud 9 does not offer paid maternity leave, which prompts Jonah and Amy to call corporate and accidentally get a union buster named Steve (Dan Bucatinsky) sent to the store. Meanwhile, Dina regrets giving up her assistant manager position, especially after learning that Jonah doesn't want to date her. Later on, Glenn tries to get around Cloud 9's maternity policy by "suspending" Cheyenne for six weeks with pay so she can be with her child, but Steve overhears it and Glenn is soon fired. This prompts everyone to walk out of the store in protest, except Dina. As the only employee who didn't walk out, Dina reassumes her assistant manager job and takes charge, with everyone else's jobs hanging in the balance. Amy's name tag: Amy

== Production ==
=== Development ===
The series was one of three pilots picked up by NBC on January 14, 2015, along with the sitcom Crowded; both were green lighted to series status the same day (May 7, 2015). The series was the first project for Ruben Fleischer's newly formed company The District as part of a two-year deal with Universal, as he directed the pilot episode. Superstore was officially picked up as a series on May 7, 2015, by NBC. The first season consisted of eleven episodes, after the episode order was reduced from thirteen on October 19, 2015. It was announced on November 2, 2015, that the show would air the premiere on January 4, 2016, but would be airing two back-to-back episodes on November 30, 2015, following The Voice. A promotional poster was released on November 2, 2015.

=== Casting ===
It was announced on February 20, 2015, that Lauren Ash had been cast as a series regular, and would be playing Dina, the store's assistant manager. On March 2, 2015, Deadline reported that Superstore had added three other cast members, which was Colton Dunn, Mark McKinney and Nico Santos. The website reported that Dunn would be playing Garrett, the often-sarcastic narrator of the piece, McKinney would be playing Glenn, the intensely religious store manager, and Santos would be playing Mateo, another new employee and a brown-noser from an impoverished background. On March 12, 2015, Nichole Bloom was announced to have joined the show as Cheyenne, a very pregnant teenage employee.

Deadline announced on March 13, 2015, that Ben Feldman had landed the male lead in Superstore, as Jonah, a new employee in the superstore Cloud 9. Three days later, TVLine announced on March 16, 2015, that America Ferrera had landed the female lead as the floor supervisor Amy in the Cloud 9 store. It was also reported that Ferrera was also a producer for the show.

== Reception ==
=== Critical reception ===
On Metacritic, the first season has a score of 58 out of 100, indicating "mixed or average" reviews based on reviews from 21 critics. On Rotten Tomatoes, the first season has a 54% rating, based on reviews from 24 critics, with an average rating of 4.4/10. The site's consensus is: "Superstore's talented cast and obvious potential are slightly overshadowed by a tonally jumbled presentation and thin, formulaic writing."

As the first season went along, reviews started to become more positive. Following the finale "Labor", the Los Angeles Times called it one of TV's best new comedies." Pilot Viruet of The A.V. Club wrote that the "first season ... got better and more confident as it moved on", and that the first-season finale "is a nice little cap to a nice little sitcom that could've used a little more attention." After the series aired its Olympics special, Variety wrote that the show was "a funny, pointed and essential workplace comedy", and that "there are no weak links in [the] ensemble".

=== Ratings ===
| No. in series | No. in season | Episode | Air date | Time slot (EST) | Rating/Share (18–49) | Viewers (m) | Timeslot rank |
|---|---|---|---|---|---|---|---|
| 1 | 1 | "Pilot" | November 30, 2015 | Monday 10:00 p.m. | 2.0/6 | 7.21 | 1 |
| 2 | 2 | "Magazine Profile" | November 30, 2015 | Monday 10:30 p.m. | 1.6/5 | 5.35 | 1 |
| 3 | 3 | "Shots and Salsa" | December 28, 2015 | Monday 9:00 p.m. | 0.8/3 | 2.62 | 2 |
| 4 | 4 | "Mannequin" | January 4, 2016 | Monday; 8:00 p.m. | 1.8/6 | 6.04 | 3 |
| 5 | 5 | "Shoplifter" | January 11, 2016 | Monday; 8:00 p.m. | 1.5/4 | 5.38 | 3 |
| 6 | 6 | "Secret Shopper" | January 18, 2016 | Monday; 8:00 p.m. | 1.7/5 | 5.66 | 3 |
| 7 | 7 | "Color Wars" | January 25, 2016 | Monday; 8:00 p.m. | 1.5/4 | 4.93 | 4 |
| 8 | 8 | "Wedding Day Sale" | February 1, 2016 | Monday; 8:00 p.m. | 1.4/5 | 4.89 | 4 |
| 9 | 9 | "All-Nighter" | February 8, 2016 | Monday; 8:00 p.m. | 1.4/5 | 5.19 | 4 |
| 10 | 10 | "Demotion" | February 15, 2016 | Monday; 8:00 p.m. | 1.2/4 | 3.89 | 4 |
| 11 | 11 | "Labor" | February 22, 2016 | Monday; 8:00 p.m. | 1.4/5 | 4.68 | 4 |

== Home media ==
The Complete First Season
| Set details | Special features |
| 11 episodes; 2-disc set; 237 minutes; English (Dolby Digital 5.1 Surround); English SDH, Spanish and French subtitles | Deleted scenes; Gag reel & Bloopers |
Release dates
| Region 1 | Region 4 |
| August 23, 2016 | September 5, 2018 |
