= Mayday! Deep Space =

2015 video game

- Developer: Daniel Wilson
- Publisher: Iron Cloud Entertainment
- Platform: iOS
- Release: January 7, 2015
- Genre: Science fiction
- Mode: Single player

Mayday! Deep Space is a science fiction video game created by developer Daniel Wilson and published by Iron Cloud Entertainment on January 7, 2015. In the game, the player must use simple voice commands to instruct a man who is stuck on a spaceship full of monsters. As of May 2016, the game is available on the Apple App Store, and an Android version is in development.

The game follows the story of an unnamed man, who is stranded on a space ship after the rest of the ship's crew members were mysteriously killed while the man was asleep. The player's role is to guide the man, and keep him alive using commands to tell him what to do.

Mayday! Deep Space generally received mixed opinions from reviewers. Critics praised the voice commands and the unique way the game allowed the player to control the main character. The main criticism for the game was the lack of length, with only a total of forty minutes of gameplay.

== Plot ==
The story begins as the player receives a call from a ship, which is named the USS Appaloosa. The player discovers that a mysterious incident led to the massacre of all of the crew members onboard, bar one. After this, the game follows the sole survivor on the spacecraft, who was on a mission. The goal of the game is to keep the man alive, by avoiding enemies and navigating him through passages and corridors on the ship.

== Gameplay ==
In the game, the main character is portrayed as a blue dot, whilst his enemies are shown as red.

In the game, the man is controlled by simple voice commands from the player, such as "go left", "run faster" and "stop". However, touch controls are also available and can be used instead. There are a total of five playable levels in the game.

Mayday! Deep Space also includes a map on the device the game is being played on, which shows the current surroundings of the player. On the map, the player is displayed as a blue dot, whilst his enemies are displayed as red dots. The game also contains environmental obstacles which must be avoided.

Since the player is leading the man in the game, rather than controlling him, the game only gives partial control over the character. The man generally listens to the player, however, if the player too obviously tries to kill the man, he will not listen to commands.

== Reception ==
Mayday! Deep Space

Aggregate score
| Aggregator | Score |
|---|---|
| Metacritic | 76/100 |

Review scores
| Publication | Score |
|---|---|
| 148Apps | 3/5 |
| Gamezebo | 5/5 |
| AppleNApps | 4/5 |
| Kill Screen | 67/100 |
| Gamer.nl | 6/10 |

The game received mostly average to positive reviews from critics. Many reviews found the use of voice commands to be unique and one of the highlights of the game as a whole. The Verge called the gameplay "simple and intuitive". David Shimomura from Kill Screen praised the game for its pace and mood, and how the games makes the player want to protect the main character, and keep him safe.

However, with only around forty minutes of gameplay, the game was criticized by some reviews for its lack of length.
