= Truške =

Truške Truscolo Kortina (until 1955)
- Village
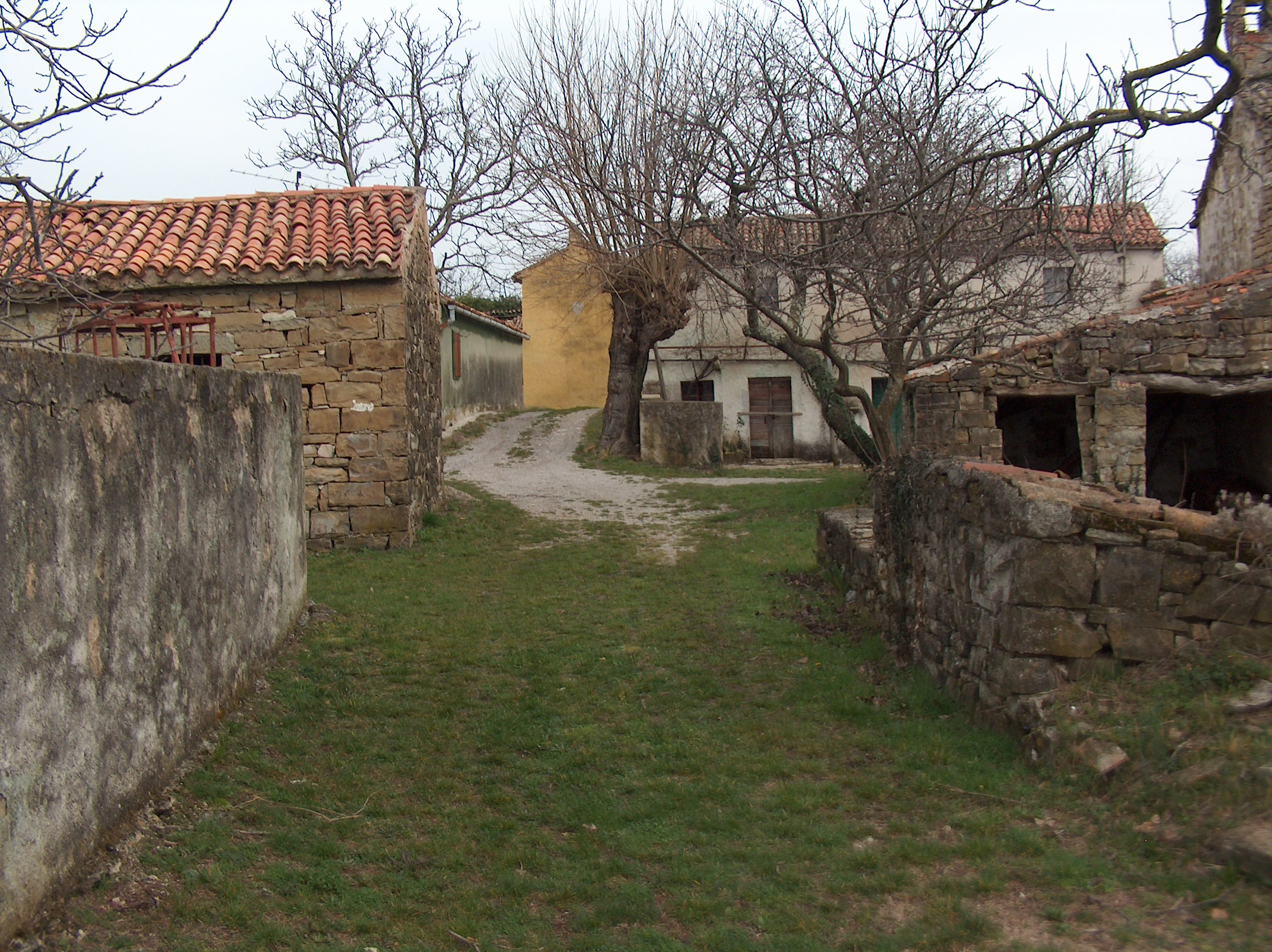

- Location in Slovenia
- Coordinates: 45°29′41.07″N 13°49′25.5″E
- Country: Slovenia
- Traditional region: Littoral
- Statistical region: Coastal–Karst
- Municipality: Koper

Area
  - Total: 4.28 km^{2} (1.65 sq mi)

Population (2002)
  - Total: 47

Truške (pronounced [ˈtɾuːʃkɛ]; Italian: Truscolo) is a village in the City Municipality of Koper in the Littoral region of Slovenia.

== Name ==
The name of the settlement was changed from Kortina (from Italian corte 'manor') to Truške in 1955. The name was changed on the basis of the 1948 Law on Names of Settlements and Designations of Squares, Streets, and Buildings as part of efforts by Slovenia's postwar communist government to remove Italian elements from toponyms.

== Church ==
The parish church, a little away from the village, is dedicated to Saint Cantianus. It is a Baroque church from the 16th century. Its exterior is simple and has a pronounced facade with a bell gable. Its interior houses Baroque equipment. The main altar from 1788 is made of stone and contains a painting of Saint Cantianus. There are also three side altars from the 19th century. The right one contains a painting of Saint Peter and Saint Paul, whereas the first left one contains a painting of Jesus blessing Saint Joseph and the second left one a painting of Saint Lucy and Saint Clare. The Stations of the Cross were created in 1835 by the painter Franc Wissiak. The church was renovated in the 1960s and in 2009.
