= Superstore season 3 =

Season of television series

Superstore
- Season 3
- Starring: America Ferrera; Ben Feldman; Lauren Ash; Colton Dunn; Nico Santos; Nichole Bloom; Mark McKinney
- No. of episodes: 22

Release
- Original network: NBC
- Original release: September 28, 2017 – May 3, 2018

Season chronology
- ← Previous; Season 2 Next → Season 4

The third season of Superstore, the American television series, was ordered on February 14, 2017. The season premiered on September 28, 2017, and contained 22 episodes. The series continues to air in the same timeslot Thursday at 8:00 PM, though the episode "Christmas Eve" aired on Tuesday, December 5. The season concluded on May 3, 2018.

Superstore follows a group of employees working at Cloud 9, a fictional big-box store in St. Louis, Missouri. The ensemble and supporting cast features America Ferrera, Ben Feldman, Lauren Ash, Colton Dunn, Nico Santos, Nichole Bloom and Mark McKinney.

== Cast ==
=== Main ===
- America Ferrera as Amy Dubanowski
- Ben Feldman as Jonah Simms
- Lauren Ash as Dina Fox
- Colton Dunn as Garrett McNeil
- Nico Santos as Mateo Fernando Aquino Liwanag
- Nichole Bloom as Cheyenne Thompson
- Mark McKinney as Glenn Sturgis

=== Recurring ===
- Michael Bunin as Jeff Sutin
- Johnny Pemberton as Bo Derek Thompson
- Kaliko Kauahi as Sandra Kaluiokalani
- Linda Porter as Myrtle Vartanian
- Josh Lawson as Tate Staskiewicz
- Jon Barinholtz as Marcus White
- Kelly Stables as Kelly Watson
- Kelly Schumann as Justine Sikowitz
- Kerri Kenney-Silver as Jerusha Sturgis
- Jennifer Irwin as Laurie Neustadt

== Episodes ==
No. overall	No. in season	Title	Directed by	Written by	Original release date	U.S. viewers (millions)
34	1	"Grand Re-Opening"	Matt Sohn	Justin Spitzer	September 28, 2017	4.60
Two months after the tornado had destroyed the store, the employees of Cloud 9 return to stock the shelves for the reopening. The staff is put in a last minute panic when Glenn misunderstands a memo from Jeff and realizes that the store is supposed to be open sooner rather than later. Jonah and Amy address the issue of their kiss, and Amy informs Jonah that she is divorcing Adam. Meanwhile, Dina gets into an awkward encounter with comedian Howie Mandel, mistaking him for one of the part-timers sent to help with the reopening of the store. Also, after Jonah reveals his apartment complex was destroyed by the tornado, a reluctant Garrett lets Jonah move into his home. Amy's name tag: Phoebe
35	2	"Brett's Dead"	Ryan Case	Sierra Teller Ornelas	October 5, 2017	4.45
The employees at Cloud 9 mourn the loss of fellow employee Brett to the tornado, though they are not sure that he is actually dead. Amy fears that Dina might be dealing with post traumatic stress following the tornado and tries to get her to open up her feelings. Dina eventually does so, but it doesn't quite turn out the way Amy hoped or planned. Meanwhile, Mateo and Cheyenne get out of their responsibilities at work by telling Glenn they were close to Brett, which backfires slightly when Glenn asks them for details about his life. Also, after moving in with Garrett, Jonah's curiosity gets the better of him and he begins asking coworkers how Garrett became paralyzed. Garrett realizes this and makes up stories to mess with Jonah. In the end, Brett turns up alive as he drove home prior to the time the tornado hit. While everyone is relieved that he has turned up alive, Mateo and Cheyenne pretend to converse with Brett in order to convince Glenn, who is watching, that they are friends. Amy's name tag: Madelyn
36	3	"Part-Time Hires"	Todd Biermann	Josh Malmuth	October 12, 2017	4.33
Cloud 9 welcomes new part-time hires, one of them being Amy's daughter Emma. Amy begins to notice Emma slacking off and questions her parenting methods when her daughter begins to talk back. She asks Jonah to intervene, and he only consents when Emma talks back to him, too. He begins to get tough with her when Glenn overhears and tells him to stop. Dina and Garrett mutually agree to take a break from their relationship when Dina reveals that she's seeing a therapist for her post-traumatic stress, but Garrett soon gets annoyed when Dina tells everyone that she "dumped" him; he then turns the tables on her but regrets it. Meanwhile, Mateo begins to flirt with a construction worker, but Cheyenne suspects the guy is just using him for personal gain. Also, another new employee named Kelly (Kelly Stables) begins her first day of work, but receives no help or training because everyone else is too busy dealing with personal issues of their own. The episode ends with Glenn notifying Kelly that she wouldn't be paid for her day's work because she failed to clock in, which frustrates her further. Amy's name tag: Christy
37	4	"Workplace Bullying"	Tristram Shapeero	Bridget Kyle & Vicky Luu	October 19, 2017	4.20
After Jonah acts timid when confronting a robber at the store, Dina chases and tackles the guy. Jeff praises Jonah for doing the right thing, as the company policy is "report, don't confront". This irritates Dina, and she teases Jonah mercilessly for his weakness, getting her in further trouble with Jeff for being a workplace bully. Dina then challenges Jonah to a fight off of company grounds, which leads to embarrassment for Jonah. Dina takes this the wrong way to assume he still has feelings for her, though he never did in the first place. Meanwhile, Glenn has a difficult time firing the lazy security guard who let in the robber. Also, Amy feels hurt when Cheyenne, Mateo and Kelly don't invite her along for their bar trivia night. Amy's name tag: Scarlett
38	5	"Sal's Dead"	Geeta V. Patel	Gabe Miller	October 26, 2017	4.61
The employees of Cloud 9 discover the body of Sal, who had become trapped in the walls. They are instructed not to touch the body until the coroner can arrive. Glenn's attempts to hide the decayed corpse are futile, as the customers think it's a Halloween decoration anyway. Amy has mixed feelings about getting back into dating and when Jonah browses Tinder in front of her, she steals his phone. After scrolling through potential matches, Amy accidentally swipes right when she sees Kelly's profile, then tries desperately to undo her action, with no help from Garrett. Meanwhile, Mateo is sad about being unable to attend his cousin's wedding in the Philippines due to his undocumented status, but Cheyenne thinks she may be able to help when she spots Sal's passport among the things left in his locker. Amy's name tag: Selena
39	6	"Health Fund"	Victor Nelli Jr.	Jackie Clarke	November 2, 2017	3.54
After the group complains about the high deductibles in Cloud 9's employee health plan, Amy puts up a collection jar to help Mateo get treatment for a painful ear infection. This inspires Jonah to start a monthly collection that all employees can contribute to, and take out of when they have deductibles to pay. Amy scoffs at the idea, but after seeing the employees praise Jonah, she wants some of the credit. Amy reconsiders when Jonah tells her the plan is failing, with employees wanting to take much more out of it than they are contributing. Meanwhile, Glenn worries about a mole on his penis, and cannot get a dermatologist appointment scheduled for six months. After a failed attempt to get Tate to look at it, he reluctantly asks Dina. Amy's name tag: Megan
40	7	"Christmas Eve"	Todd Biermann	Eric Ledgin	December 5, 2017	4.41
Amy, trying to prove that she is not just a stick in the mud and can be fun and crazy, gets the staff drunk on Christmas Eve. After calling Adam to back her up on a story she is telling, Amy hears the voice of Adam's new girlfriend, the mother of one of Emma's classmates. Too drunk to drive, Amy, Dina and Cheyenne take scooter carts to confront Adam, and awkwardness ensues. Meanwhile, Jonah and Garrett's roommate issues boil over and they fight it out as Santa and elf, ending with Jonah storming off. When Kelly goes to see if Jonah is okay, they strike up a conversation, and later leave together. Elsewhere, Glenn tries to convince Mateo that Christmas is not just "fine". At the end of the episode, Sandra finds out her boyfriend Jerry is finally out of his coma, and takes a scooter cart to the hospital. Amy's name tag: Grasiela
41	8	"Viral Video"	Ken Whittingham	Jonathan Green	January 4, 2018	3.90
After a video is released of an employee farting into the kitchen cups, Jeff calls a meeting informing the staff to be cautious of what they post online. It is revealed Kelly is making videos on Instagram that bring amusement to everyone on the staff except Amy. Amy learns through one of the videos that Kelly and Jonah are now dating, and she goes to great lengths to make a video more popular than Kelly's, and to prove she is not jealous of the relationship. A video of Amy's goes viral, but the reason behind the view count causes a dent in Cloud 9's reputation. Meanwhile, Mateo has been taking advantage of the policy that for every reward card issued, the employee receives a dollar, and has been making up fake customers. When Glenn finds out, he tries to pry the truth out of him, leading to an awkward situation. Elsewhere, Dina and Cheyenne bond as they monitor the social media activity of all the staff members. Amy's name tag: Caroline
42	9	"Golden Globes Party"	Victor Nelli Jr.	Vanessa Ramos	January 11, 2018	3.83
When Amy throws a Golden Globes party to prove how great she's doing post-divorce, she's forced to enlist Dina and Jonah's help when her barbecue goes awry. The party gets even more shaky, as does Amy's claim that her life is not in shambles, when she cannot figure out how to fix the television and is even unaware of her own wifi password. Meanwhile, Glenn and his wife Jerusha (Kerri Kenney) are forced to conduct some personal business at Amy's home, giving the guests yet another reason to want to leave. Also, Sandra brings boyfriend Jerry to the party, marking his first time in public since coming out of his coma, and Kelly feels left out when Jonah and the others laugh over stories from before she started working with them. Amy's name tag: Yolanda
43	10	"High Volume Store"	Jay Hunter	Owen Ellickson	January 18, 2018	3.57
When Jeff announces that the store needs an $80,000 day to get an upgrade and change from a "Triple A" to a "Quad A" store, the team is a bit hesitant, until they hear of the potential Pizza Hut that will be built into the store. Despite this, Amy, Jonah and Dina set out to discover the pros and cons of the overall change by visiting a Quad A store during lunch. Meanwhile, Glenn reveals that wife Jerusha is unable to get pregnant due to a misshapen uterus. When Cheyenne accidentally volunteers to be his surrogate, she tries desperately to back out. In the end, Dina agrees to be Glenn's surrogate. Amy's name tag: Gail
44	11	"Angels and Mermaids"	Michael Spiller	Justin Shanes	January 25, 2018	4.23
Amy finds herself caught in the middle of a conflict between Cheyenne and her ex-convict mom, Brandi, and realizes that either side she supports will cause her pain, until she ends up on the receiving side of the intervention. Meanwhile, after Dina reads over Glenn's surrogacy contract, she makes some drastic changes to it, resulting in Glenn hiring a lawyer (Matt Oberg). The situation escalates when Dina threatens to have unprotected sex with Marcus, and Glenn pretends to have Sandra be his surrogate instead. Also, Jonah and Kelly are planning an exciting weekend in the Ozarks, complete with puzzles and all, and Garrett, with the apartment to himself, is excited to play video games with his friend Randy. However, when Jonah mocks Kelly for believing in angels, both Jonah and Garrett's weekend plans are jeopardized. Amy's name tag: Teresa
45	12	"Groundhog Day"	Jaffar Mahmood	Sierra Teller Ornelas	February 1, 2018	3.43
After becoming flustered when a customer flirts with her, Amy is bitten by the store groundhog. When Cheyenne and Mateo observe the disaster, Mateo attempts to set Amy up with potential suitors, including his cousin and Marcus. Amy ends up finding an unlikely friendship in Tate the pharmacist, and news of what they did spreads around the store the next day. Meanwhile, Glenn decides Dina should relax in order to have a smooth start to her pregnancy, so Garrett steps up to be the temporary assistant manager. While Garrett is preoccupied with "managing" (playing video games), Jonah takes over the store announcements, with Kelly's help. Amy's name tag: Lynda / Charlotte
46	13	"Video Game Release"	America Ferrera	Jackie Clarke	March 1, 2018	3.38
When gamers invade Cloud 9 for the release of a hot new video game, Barbarian's Gate 3, Jonah tries to help Amy secure a copy of the game, which takes them on an unexpected adventure. Garrett makes a fool of himself in front of his hero Erick Evans (Phil LaMarr), who narrates the video game, then enlists Mateo's help to make a good second impression. Meanwhile, Glenn and Sandra vow to be more assertive with customers after Dina embarrasses them, and instead instigate a breastfeeding "nurse-in". Dina tells Glenn that the implantation worked and that she is now officially pregnant. At the end of the episode, Amy invites Jonah to explore the new video game with her, but he says he made plans with Kelly. Amy then admits to Dina that she may have a crush on Jonah. Amy's name tag: Claudia
47	14	"Safety Training"	Rebecca Asher	Bridget Kyle & Vicky Luu	March 8, 2018	3.37
When a sign Kelly did not hang up correctly falls and injures Mateo, Amy takes the blame because she is trying to be nicer to Kelly as a way to hide her feelings for Jonah. The situation spirals, and ends up with Dina replaying security camera footage to implicate Kelly for hanging the sign, but she instead shows the entire staff the clip of Amy and Jonah kissing during the tornado. Elsewhere, Jeff returns to offer money to Mateo in exchange for him not suing the store, but Mateo is unable to accept the money because the liability waiver would reveal his undocumented status. When Jeff believes he will not take the money because he is still mad about their breakup, Mateo is forced to reveal the truth to him. Hearing about Mateo, Marcus becomes determined to get himself injured in order to receive money. When he is unable to hurt himself, Garrett volunteers to help out. Amy's name tag: Ruby
48	15	"Amnesty"	Keith Powell	Eric Ledgin	March 15, 2018	3.93
When Glenn and Dina offer amnesty to all the employees for any bad things they confess, Garrett and Cheyenne try to decide how to take advantage of it. When Mateo hears of the offer, he worries they know about him being undocumented, and desperately tries to get in contact with Jeff to see if he told anyone about it. At the end of the episode, Jeff appears, revealing to Mateo that he has quit his job. Meanwhile, in the aftermath of Dina showing their kiss, Amy and Jonah try to dispel any rumors that they like each other, but both manage to make it worse than before, with Kelly becoming annoyed. To show Kelly that he likes her and not Amy, Jonah suggests they move in together. Amy's name tag: Kelsey
49	16	"Target"	Daniella Eisman	Jonathan Green & Gabe Miller	March 22, 2018	3.85
After Jeff announces he's leaving Cloud 9 to manage a Target store, Garrett asks Glenn for a raise by leading him to believe that Jeff is poaching Cloud 9 employees. In return, Glenn and Garrett try to poach employees from Target, where they come across Cheyenne, who reveals she works part-time at both stores. Amy goes on a double date with Dina only to find that her date is not who she expected, but finds a friend in the Cloud 9 beverage delivery man who is also at the restaurant. Back at the store, Kelly and Jonah discuss moving in together, with Jonah insisting they lay out furniture to prove the place she likes is too small. Later, Jeff admits to Mateo that he does not actually work at Target, but didn't want his former Cloud 9 crew to know he is unemployed. Amy's name tag: Sam
50	17	"District Manager"	Alex Reid	John Kazlauskas	March 29, 2018	2.96
Laurie, the new district manager, visits the store and decides to make some cuts to save money. After hearing Amy's opinions on particular staff members, Laurie decides to fire Myrtle, much to everyone’s dismay. Amy and Jonah plead with her to reconsider, and search for other ways to make up the money. After hearing the news, Glenn attempts to give Myrtle the best work day possible before he has to let her go. Meanwhile, Mateo struggles to prove his skills on the cash register and enlists Garrett's help in changing his records, while Dina worries that Laurie will be judgmental of her pregnancy and tries different ways to cover it up. Amy's name tag: Kim
51	18	"Local Vendors Day"	Geeta V. Patel	Josh Malmuth	April 5, 2018	3.17
When the store hosts its annual local vendors day, Glenn insists that there is no pressure on employees to purchase any of Jerusha's needlepoint crafts, but when she breaks down after a day of slow sales, Glenn insists that everyone buys something. At other booths, Marcus tries to sell his breast milk cheese, and Garrett attempts to make a woman admit her “craft beer” is just rebottled Bud Light. Meanwhile, when Alex jokingly tells Amy she needs to turn in her "Latina card", she tries to prove him wrong by speaking the little Spanish that she knows, leading to her saying "yes" to something Alex offers in Spanish that she didn't really understand. Amy's name tag: Stella
52	19	"Lottery"	Ben Feldman	Vanessa Ramos	April 12, 2018	3.08
The Cloud 9 employees and customers get lottery fever when the jackpot reaches a record high. As the employees discuss what they would do with their winnings, Jonah irritates Kelly when his "lottery fantasy" doesn't include her. Mateo and Cheyenne wonder aloud if they would still be friends if the other won the jackpot, leading them to pool their money for lotto tickets while agreeing to split the winnings. Garrett keeps talking customers out of playing the lotto by citing the astronomical odds against winning, which angers Dina who is trying to sell more tickets than her rival at a neighboring store. Elsewhere, Jonah encourages Amy to ask Laurie for a raise after Glenn says he's no longer allowed to approve pay increases. This leads to them confronting Laurie as she plays golf, with disastrous results. In the aftermath, Jonah and Amy spend the evening together at the golf course, causing Jonah to forget about a dinner date with Kelly. Amy's name tag: Daisy
53	20	"Gender Reveal"	Tristram Shapeero	Lauren Ash	April 19, 2018	2.76
Glenn and Jerusha receive an envelope containing the gender of their baby, and decide to throw a gender reveal party in the store. However, things go awry when Glenn entrusts Garrett with the envelope, who loses it. Elsewhere, Mateo enlists Jonah to help Jeff face reality by lecturing him about getting a job, and Dina begins freaking out at the realities of delivering a baby. Her paranoia becomes extreme after hearing horror stories from other women, and prompts an unwelcome revelation for Amy: she is also pregnant. When Dina and Cheyenne speculate who the father is, Amy reveals she slept with Adam recently when they both felt alone. At the end of the episode, Amy approaches Jonah in the warehouse and the two share a kiss, followed by her revealing she's pregnant. Amy's name tag: June
54	21	"Aftermath"	Ryan Case	Justin Shanes & Owen Ellickson	April 26, 2018	2.85
The episode begins immediately after Amy and Jonah’s kiss. They attempt to deal with the consequences, but soon get into an argument, culminating in Amy telling Jonah to go to hell. Glenn and Dina enlist Garrett's help to win the store a visit from the CEO for Cloud 9's annual Town Hall meeting, and decide to make a video of the staff recalling their feelings from when the tornado hit the store. Meanwhile, news of Amy's pregnancy spreads around the store, and Cheyenne and Bo offer her some of their old baby clothes. Adam arrives at the store only to learn that he's the father, and Amy breaks up with Alex, while Jonah breaks up with Kelly. Amy's name tag: Malina
55	22	"Town Hall"	Matt Sohn	Story by : Justin Spitzer; Teleplay by : Jonathan Green & Gabe Miller	May 3, 2018	2.97
As the store prepares to host a company-wide live-streamed Town Hall meeting, Amy and Jonah put aside their conflict and rally their co-workers to confront the CEO about why Myrtle was fired. They recruit Jeff to infiltrate the meeting and reveal that all employees over 70 were targeted for dismissal due to higher healthcare costs. To ensure the news gets out, Garrett sets up a hidden camera in a potted plant in case the main camera crew stops filming. Glenn caves under the pressure of speaking to a global audience and farts during his live speech, while Jeff ultimately chickens out when the CEO offers him a regional manager job in Chicago. Later, Jonah and Amy are clearing plants from the set to the photo lab, where they suddenly start having sex; as this happens, Garrett’s camera goes live and captures it, streaming it to all Cloud 9 stores globally. Amy's name tag: Olivia

== Production ==
=== Casting ===
It was announced on July 28, 2017, that Kelly Stables had been cast in a recurring role as new Cloud 9 employee named Kelly, who, as a recently divorced woman, strikes up a relationship with Ben Feldman's character Jonah.

=== Timeslot changes ===
On May 14, 2017, NBC originally announced that Superstore would be moving its timeslot from Thursday at 8:00 PM to Tuesday at 9:00 PM with returning series This Is Us anchoring Thursday night. However, on May 30, 2017, NBC reverted its decision and moved it back to its original timeslot along with returning comedies The Good Place, Will & Grace and Great News.

== Ratings ==
No. in series	No. in season	Episode	Air date	Time slot (EST)	Rating/Share (18–49)	Viewers (m)	Timeslot rank
34	1	"Grand Re-Opening"	September 28, 2017	Thursday; 8:00 p.m.	1.3/5	4.60	3
35	2	"Brett's Dead"	October 5, 2017	Thursday; 8:00 p.m.	1.2/5	4.45	3
36	3	"Part-Time Hires"	October 12, 2017	Thursday; 8:00 p.m.	1.1/4	4.33	3
37	4	"Workplace Bullying"	October 19, 2017	Thursday; 8:00 p.m.	1.1/4	4.20	3
38	5	"Sal’s Dead"	October 26, 2017	Thursday; 8:00 p.m.	1.2/5	4.61	3
39	6	"Health Fund"	November 2, 2017	Thursday; 8:00 p.m.	1.0/4	3.54	3
40	7	"Christmas Eve"	December 5, 2017	Tuesday; 9:30 p.m.	1.1/4	4.41	1
41	8	"Viral Video"	January 4, 2018	Thursday; 8:00 p.m.	1.1/4	3.90	3
42	9	"Golden Globes Party"	January 11, 2018	Thursday; 8:00 p.m.	1.1/4	3.83	2
43	10	"High Volume Store"	January 18, 2018	Thursday; 8:00 p.m.	1.0/4	3.57	4
44	11	"Angels and Mermaids"	January 25, 2018	Thursday; 8:00 p.m.	1.2/5	4.23	2
45	12	"Groundhog Day"	February 1, 2018	Thursday; 8:00 p.m.	1.1/4	3.43	4
46	13	"Video Game Release"	March 1, 2018	Thursday; 8:00 p.m.	0.9/4	3.38	3
47	14	"Safety Training"	March 8, 2018	Thursday; 8:00 p.m.	1.0/4	3.37	3
48	15	"Amnesty"	March 15, 2018	Thursday; 8:00 p.m.	1.0/4	3.93	3
49	16	"Target"	March 22, 2018	Thursday; 8:00 p.m.	1.1/4	3.85	3
50	17	"District Manager"	March 29, 2018	Thursday; 8:00 p.m.	0.8/3	2.96	3
51	18	"Local Vendors Day"	April 5, 2018	Thursday; 8:00 p.m.	0.8/3	3.17	3
52	19	"Lottery"	April 12, 2018	Thursday; 8:00 p.m.	0.9/4	3.08	3
53	20	"Gender Reveal"	April 19, 2018	Thursday; 8:00 p.m.	0.8/3	2.76	3
54	21	"Aftermath"	April 26, 2018	Thursday; 8:00 p.m.	0.7/3	2.85	4
55	22	"Town Hall"	May 3, 2018	Thursday; 8:00 p.m.	0.8/4	2.97	3
