= Timofei Bondarev =

Russian peasant philosopher (1820 - 1898)

Timofej Mikhailovich Bondarev (Тимофе́й Миха́йлович Бо́ндарев 3 April 1820—3 November 1898) was a Russian peasant philosopher. He wrote the treatise The Triumph of the Farmer or Industry and Parasitism, which inspired Leo Tolstoy. Tolstoy saw to its publication in 1888 and 1906.

== Life ==
Bondarev was born a serf in southern Russia. When he was 37, his owner signed a commission to send him to the army for a 25-year conscription period. The conscription forcibly separated Bondarev from his wife and children. In the military, he renounced his Russian Orthodox faith and joined the Subbotniks, a Sabbatarian sect. In 1867 he was arrested for apostasy, discharged from the army, and sentenced to a life in exile on the Yenisei River in far eastern Russia.

As the only literate resident of his village, Bondarev founded a school, where he taught for 30 years in addition to farming. He also developed his philosophy of labor, which he wrote about in his treatise, The Triumph of the Farmer or Industry and Parasitism. His philosophy centered on the concept of "bread-labor", by which all men, regardless of social status, are morally obligated to perform the manual labor necessary to sustain themselves.

Leo Tolstoy read the treatise in 1885 and started a long correspondence with Bondarev. He also went to great lengths to publish the work. The first two attempts were censored, but in 1888, the weekly journal Russkoye Delo (The Russian Cause) published a version edited by Tolstoy, who also provided a supplementary essay. It was translated into English and French in 1890. In 1906, Tolstoy's publishing house The Intermediary published the treatise in book form.
