= The Triumph of the Farmer or Industry and Parasitism =

Book by Timofei Bondarev

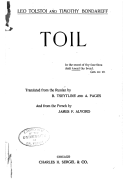
- 1890 English translation, titled Toil
- Author: Timofei Bondarev
- Language: Russian
- Publisher: Russkoye Delo (1888 edited version); The Intermediary (1906)

The Triumph of the Farmer or Industry and Parasitism (Russian: Torzhestvo zemledel'tsa ili Trudoljubie i Tunejadstvo) is a treatise by Russian peasant philosopher Timofei Bondarev. The work details Bondarev's labor philosophy, in particular his idea of "bread-labor", by which every man is responsible for the physical labor required to sustain himself. The treatise captivated writer Leo Tolstoy, who began a long correspondence with Bondarev and endeavored for years to see the work published. An abbreviated version was published in 1888, and the full work was published in 1906.

== Contents ==
The work details Bondarev's philosophy on morality and labor. In particular, Bondarev explicates the theory of "bread-labor", arguing that all men, regardless of social position, are morally obligated to perform the physical labor necessary to sustain themselves. Bondarev took his inspiration from Genesis 3:19, in which God tells Adam after banishing him from the Garden of Eden: "In the sweat of thy face shalt thou eat bread, till thou return unto the ground; for out of it wast thou taken....." Bondarev interprets this not as a curse, but as a commandment that will lead to salvation if followed. According to Bondarev, social inequality, exploitation, and strife are the product of society's failure to adhere to the principal of bread-labor, which he regards as an inexorable moral and religious imperative.

Published versions of the text also generally include an essay by Leo Tolstoy, sometimes known as "Industry and Idleness", which introduces and elaborates upon the work and its ideas.

== History ==
Bondarev was born a serf in southern Russia. In the 1850s, his owner commissioned him into the army for a 25-year term, forcibly separating Bondarev from his wife and children. In the army he abandoned his Russian Orthodox faith and became a Subbotnik. In 1867, he was arrested for apostasy and exiled to a remote village on the Yenisey River for life. As the village's only literate resident, Bondarev founded a school. He spent the next 30 years teaching, farming and developing his philosophy of labor. The culmination of his life's work was his treatise The Triumph of the Farmer or Industry and Parasitism, which he composed primarily in the late 1870s and early 1880s.

In July 1885, another political exile sent a copy of The Triumph of the Farmer to Leo Tolstoy, who had read of it earlier in a journal. Tolstoy was captivated, saying he agreed with "everything in" the manuscript, and started a correspondence with Bondarev, which lasted until Bondarev's death in 1898. Tolstoy went to great lengths to get the work published, but its radical content ran it afoul of government censors. Censors excised it at the last moment from the journal Russian Wealth in 1886 and from Russian Antiquity in 1888. Later in 1888, the weekly Russkoye Delo (The Russian Cause) published an abbreviated version edited by Tolstoy, who also provided a supplementary essay, in issues 12 and 13. The Ministry of Internal Affairs issued a caution and all copies were later destroyed.

== Editions and translations ==
The Triumph of the Farmer or Industry and Parasitism was translated into French and English in 1890. Tolstoy worked with the French publishers to produce the translation by V. Tseytline and A. Pages, released in Paris as Le'on Tolstoi et Timothe' Bondareff: Le travail. That year Mary Cruger produced an English translation in Toronto under the name Labour: The Divine Command. This was based not on the original Russian, but on Tseytline and Page's French version. The same year in Chicago James F. Alvord produced another English translation, also adapted from the French version, under the title Toil. Bondarev was unhappy with the quality of the translation and with the abridgments, and communicated his displeasure to both Tolstoy and to Gleb Uspensky. Finally in 1906, eight years after Bondarev's death, Tolstoy's publishing house The Intermediary published The Triumph of the Farmer or Industry and Parasitism in full, along with Tolstoy's introduction.
