= Labor Day in Toledo, Spain =

Labor Day (el Primero de Mayo or el Día del Trabajador in Spain) began following a workers’ protest in Chicago, United States, in 1886. The protest was originally planned to last one day, but instead lasted several weeks, culminating in the imprisonment and assassination of several protesters.

Labor Day has been recognized internationally since in 1890, although it did not become a holiday in Spain until 1931. Since then, its legal and celebrative status has varied greatly. El Primero de Mayo in Toledo has always differed from the rest of Spain because it coincides with the celebration of la Virgen del Valle (the Virgin of the Valley), the town's main annual pilgrimage.

== Pilgrimage of la Virgen del Valle ==
The Virgen del Valle pilgrimage has been celebrated since 1680 and is Toledo's most populous pilgrimage. It was originally celebrated on August 1, but changed to May to avoid the heat. The main site of the celebration is one of the most visited places of the city, from which one can enjoy the best panoramic view, el Valle de Toledo (Toledo's Valley). The celebration begins on the night of April 30 with parties and reunions between friends and families, which causes 24 hours of heavy work for the town's authorities, since some of the day's traditions are dangerous. Many events require police and firefighter attention during the celebration surrounding the pilgrimage, such as small fires on the hill on which the valley sits, teenagers trying to climb the Rey Moro rock that overlooks the city, and problems with public order.

The hermitage of la Virgen del Valle is located in the Valley of Toledo, from which the Virgin received her name, and was built over the remains of the hermitage for San Pedro de Saelicos. On May 1, the hermitage opens at six thirty in the morning and holds mass every hour from seven to eleven, when the Eucharist is officiated and attended by local authorities and brotherhoods that are invited. Even though the masses themselves attract a large number of people, perhaps the main attraction of the hermitage of la Virgen del Valle is the bell in its interior that many women try to get close enough to ring. The superstition surrounding such bell is that women of marrying age who ring it will find a boyfriend that same year, and those who already have a partner will be married by the year's end. Another tradition involving the hermitage states that pregnant women should collect fennel growing in the surrounding area, as it is believed to give strength to the mother during labor.

Part of the celebration of the Virgin involves carrying a statue of her on foot from the hermitage in the Valley to the city's center, which usually takes place on the afternoon of May 1. For the pilgrimage, authorities close roads and avenues involved in its path, the main one used today being the highway Ronda Toledo. The arrival of the statue to the city finalizes the celebration of la Virgen del Valle.

== Primero de Mayo in Toledo ==
The history of the holiday of el Día del Trabajador starts during Francisco Franco’s dictatorship (1936-75), its return to the status of national holiday – in Toledo is similar to the rest of Spain, but part of the way in which the day is celebrated has a distinct characteristic. Since 1892, the oldest registered Primero de Mayo in Toledo, the theater has played a main part in the holiday’s celebration and the fight for the working class’s rights. On May 1st, 1892, the Teatro Estrella was chosen as the site for a meeting organized by the Socialist Group of Toledo, to which they invited all of Toledo’s workers. The meeting which took place in that theater was crucial for the formation of a labor force in Toledo, since there it was declared that May 1st was a very big day for Toledo’s working class and several workers were persuaded to affiliate themselves with the Socialist Workers’ Party. This reunion, and therefore the theater, were the starting point of the organization of labor unions in Toledo that would fight for workers’ rights in coming years.

In 1931 Toledo, the theater served as a method to organize the protesting workers and avoid chaos during the first Primero de Mayo as a national holiday and under the Second Republic. The Board of Directors of the Casa del Pueblo (People's House), the modern headquarters of the Spanish Socialist Worker's Party in Toledo, fearing violent manifestations that would damage the day's newfound status as a holiday, organized an act at the Teatro de Rojas in celebration of the holiday and in which several important people, both local and from Madrid, would perform. In a message to workers in Toledo who planned to protest, the Board of Directors stated that they organized the act at the theater not only as a celebration, but also as a method to arrange the departure of the manifestation from the theater as a starting point, since the General Workers Union and the Socialist Party would be there at the end of the act to lead the protest. The Board of Directors also asked that the workers bring their banners and flags to the act, as if the manifestation were really starting inside the Teatro de Rojas. On this specific day in Toledo, the theater was the source of inspiration so that the workers would have a peaceful and organized manifestation.

During Francisco Franco's dictatorship, from 1936 to 1975, the theater and el Día del Trabajador were intimately connected throughout all of Spain, and Toledo was no different. During the time in which the holiday was prohibited by Franco, from 1937 to 1977, the republican Spaniards came to celebrate the working class through acts performed behind closed doors in theaters. In Toledo, the majority of acts and meetings probably occurred at the Teatro de Rojas or in the Sala Garcilaso, since around that time these were two of the most utilized spaces by labor organizations. During that time, since all of Spain was using the theater as a medium for secret celebrations, Toledo's Primero de Mayo was not unique in any way besides the pilgrimage for la Virgen del Valle. Similarly to the rest of the country, in 1956 Toledo began celebrating San José Artesano on May 1, as requested by Pope Pius XII and mandated by Franco. A different, but not necessarily unique, aspect of Toledo in 1956 was the support shown to workers and their rights by the church at the city's first mass to San José Artesano. On May 1, former Día del Trabajador, the Workers' Brotherhood of Catholic Action of Toledo gathered in a chapel for a mass in honor of San José Artesano, which was officiated by cardinal doctor Pla y Deniel. Before starting the ceremony, the cardinal directed his words to the workers to subtly express the church's position regarding the dictatorship's demands of the working class in the past. During his speech, doctor Pla y Deniel mentioned that the church wanted to make the world a better place and that the system of distribution of goods be more equative, directly mentioning one of the workers’ main complaints since Primero de Mayo's creation in 1890: the lack of fair wages. The cardinal also called the working class's desires to obtain a better quality of life ‘legitimate aspirations’, suggesting the church's support to workers’ demands to their bosses and government. Even though such demonstration of support by part of the church probably was not unique to Toledo, it was an event that separated the city from several others in Spain that year.

More recently, the theater has continued to take part of the celebration of el Día del Trabajador in Toledo, but in a more indirect way. In 2015, during the first 3 days of May, Toledo acted as a grandiose stage for dozens of street theater performances, put on by 12 different companies coming from all around the world. The festival, planned by the El Greco Foundation and the City Council of Toledo, shared the streets with the Primero de Mayo manifestations in 2014 and 2015, but could not return for a 3rd year due to lack of funds. Even though the connection between such festival and el Día del Trabajador in Toledo may not be clear, the recent presence of a theater festival which uses the streets – also the holiday's main stage – in a city in which the relationship between theater and Primero de Mayo was well established in the past seems to be something worth reflecting upon.
