= Vanessa Ramos =

American television writer

- Education: Texas State University
- Occupation: Writer • Television producer
- Known for: Creator of Blockbuster

Vanessa Ramos is an American television writer and producer. She has written for several television series including Superstore, Bordertown, Crashing and Brooklyn Nine-Nine. She created the workplace comedy series Blockbuster, which ran for one season on Netflix before its cancellation.

== Biography ==
Ramos grew up in San Antonio. She graduated from Texas State University and moved to Los Angeles where she worked at the box office of the improv theater iO West. She eventually started stand-up comedy. She was contracted to write jokes for comedians making TV appearances, and joined the staff of Comedy Central Roast.

She was a writer of the workplace comedy Superstore alongside Sierra Teller Ornelas.

In April 2021, she signed a deal with Universal Television to produce a single-camera workplace comedy, the series Blockbuster, which ran on Netflix but was cancelled after one season. The irony of running on Netflix a show about Blockbuster - whose demise was partly caused by Netflix - was part of the advertising twist about the series. She said she heavily relied on her previous experience writing Brooklyn Nine-Nine for Luke Del Tredici and Dan Goor to create the story-line of Blockbuster.
