= 2019 in Philippine television =

The following is a list of events affecting Philippine television in 2019. Events listed include television show debuts, finales, cancellations, and channel launches, closures and rebrandings, as well as information about controversies and carriage disputes.

== Events ==
=== January ===
- January 1:
  - ABS-CBN Corporation extends the free trial broadcasts of additional digital terrestrial television channels available exclusively on ABS-CBN TV Plus, such as Asianovela Channel, Movie Central, Myx, Jeepney TV and O Shopping.
  - MTVph was officially closed and it was switched back to MTV Asia.
  - After 1 year of carriage disputes, both Solar Entertainment Corporation channels Jack TV and Solar Sports were returned to Sky Cable. Meanwhile, Basketball TV and NBA Premium TV were also returned to Sky Cable, Sky Direct and Sky On Demand as immediately after 2 months of their disputes.
  - Sky Cable terminated GNN on its line-up due to being unable to agree on both sides for the renewal terms on its channel carriage.
- January 4 – After nearly 7 months of preparation and conducting its test broadcast on major cable and satellite providers, RJTV officially started its broadcast on digital terrestrial television with its first two subchannels namely, "RJTV" and "Oras ng Himala" of Jesus is our Shield Worldwide Ministries. It was initially set to launch on July 15, 2018, but delayed to the 1st quarter of 2019, the network plans to accommodate six and 1seg digital channels that will air local & foreign content and considering launch its two "Teleradyo" style subchannels for sister stations Radyo Bandido 810 AM and RJ 100.3 FM.
- January 9 – After 6 years and 10 months, Hyper was rebranded as One Sports, the relaunch of international and localized sports channel in partnership with MVP-owned media properties 5 and ESPN5. WWE Smackdown was the first program aired on the newly rebranded channel.
- January 12 – After 7 years of broadcast, AksyonTV ended its commercial operations on Saturday evening.
- January 13 – 5 gets a new refreshed logo and along with its sister network, AksyonTV officially relaunched as 5 Plus. 5 Plus' programs now airs additional sports content and sports-related programs targeted at millennials; it also serves as a competitor to ABS-CBN's S+A, which also carries the same format. All of Radyo5 simulcast programs moved to the newly launched stand-alone satellite channel under test broadcast, exclusively on pay TV satellite service, Cignal.
- January 24 – ABS-CBN Corporation quietly sold 49% of AMCARA Broadcasting Network to one of the majority shareholders, Rodrigo V. Carandang.

=== February ===
- February 1:
  - Cignal celebrated its 10th anniversary.
  - After almost 11 years of broadcasting, GNN was rebranded as One Media Network. On February 4, the channel has switched its airing of aspect ratio format quality of its programming to widescreen format (16:9) as being converted its mitigation of reception through digital signal reception through free TV, G Sat and digital platforms after 16 years and a month on the usage of broadcast video picture resolution that migrated from fullscreen format (4:3).
- February 2 – People's Television Network celebrated its 45th anniversary of broadcasting on Philippine television.
- February 18 – After 1 month and 5 days of test broadcast, the Radyo5 simulcast channel initially metamorphosed as One PH exclusively on Cignal, a pay TV satellite service. It will be second news channel of the pay satellite service following the launching of the English news channel One News in 2018 and the third channel to use the "One" branding following the rebranding of the sports channel Hyper to One Sports in the previous month.
- February 23 – Mitch Montecarlo Suansane was hailed as the Miss Q & A InterTALAKtic 2019 on It's Showtime. It was held at Smart Araneta Coliseum.

=== March ===
- March 1 – ABS-CBN Corporation extends again for the second time for the free trial broadcasts of additional digital terrestrial television channels available exclusively on ABS-CBN TV Plus, such as Asianovela Channel, Movie Central, Myx, Jeepney TV and O Shopping.
- March 29 – Converge ICT launched its own mobile streaming service, Converge Freedom.
- March 30 – Echo Calingal was proclaimed as BakClash grand winner on Eat Bulaga!.

=== April ===
- April 3 − Derek Ramsay transferred and returned to GMA Network.
- April 7 – The FCPC Baliktanaw was named the grand winner of the first season of World of Dance Philippines.
- April 14 – TAP Sports 1 and TAP Sports 2 were launched by TAP Digital Media Ventures Corporation, exclusively on Sky Cable.
- April 21 − Knowledge Channel moved their channel to DTV Channel 2.01 from DTV Channel 1.05 and began its test broadcast after 4 years as an encrypted channel exclusively on ABS-CBN TV Plus for Mega Manila, Metro Cebu and Cagayan de Oro only.
- April 24 − After 14 years, GMA Network's subsidiary Citynet Network Marketing and Productions and ZOE Broadcasting Network announced a termination of its blocktime deal for airing GMA-produced programs on ZOE's owned Channel 11 effective June 3 as a GMA-owned TV network, GMA News TV (which broadcast on its said channel frequency) was transferred to Citynet's owned Channel 27 the following day.

=== May ===
- May 13–14 – All Philippine TV networks had its special coverage of the 2019 elections.
- May 15
  - GMA Network's digital broadcast transferred to its permanent frequency on Channel 15 from Channel 27, following the termination of blocktime deal between GMA and ZOE on April 24, as the former frequency will be used by GMA News TV from its current frequency on Channel 11 beginning on June 4.
  - The NU Bulldogs wins the UAAP Season 81 men's volleyball championship title after defeating the FEU Tamaraws 2–0 in a best-of-three series. This was their second consecutive volleyball championship title since UAAP Season 76.
- May 18 – The Ateneo Lady Eagles wins the UAAP Season 81 women's volleyball championship title after defeating the UST Golden Tigresses 2–1 in a best-of-three series. This was their third championship title since they won their last title in 2015.
- May 19 – Anton Fausto, Dani Mortel, and Aya Fernandez were named as the new MYX VJs at the end of Myx VJ Search 2019.
- May 23 – The Philippines' female-oriented TV channel, ETC celebrates on its 15th year on free-to-air television.
- May 24 – ABS-CBN continued to celebrate its 65th anniversary of Philippine television. Kapamilya stars, personalities, and employees past and present show support for the network and greeted the anniversary.
- May 30 - Rated K celebrated its 15th anniversary in Philippine television.
- May 31 – Eat Bulaga! introduced their new segment. It is based from the Slippery Stairs game from Japan which is a franchise and adaptation, Rush 4 Win Philippines: Slippery Stairs: produced by Tokyo Broadcasting System.

=== June ===
- June 1:
  - ABS-CBN Corporation extends again for the third time for the free trial broadcasts of additional digital terrestrial television channels available exclusively on ABS-CBN TV Plus, such as Asianovela Channel, Movie Central, Myx, Jeepney TV and O Shopping.
  - ABS-CBN launched "ABS-CBN TV Plus Go", a digital TV dongle for Android smartphones.
  - Jesus the Healer celebrated its 30th anniversary on Philippine television.
- June 3 – Head coach Chot Reyes was replaced by Jane Basas as the new president and CEO of TV5 Network, Inc.
- June 4 – After 8 years of broadcasting on Channel 11, GMA News TV transferred to Channel 27 (which also serves as the station's return on-air in the analog after 18 years of hibernation) due to GMA/Citynet's termination of blocktime agreement with ZOE Broadcasting Network. Their digital broadcast, on the other hand, will move to UHF Channel 15 to continue its digital test broadcast. A one-day extension had been made to midnight, allowing channel 11 viewers to carry news coverage related to the first day of classes in public schools in the country, averting a June 2 deadline.
- June 6 – Living Asia Channel celebrated its 15th anniversary of broadcasting.
- June 12 – The Philippines' leading Pinoy movie pay TV channel, Cinema One, marks its 25th year on cable television.
- June 29 – GMA Network, Inc. plans a new partnership with over-the-top (OTT) digital streaming service Jungo TV to launch the company's networks Front Row Channel and Hallypop to the market; the Philippine launch of Jungo TV's channels will be launched at a later date. It will mark the company's second joint partnership with other media companies in other markets. (GMA already handles programming output content to Fox Filipino, which is owned by Walt Disney Direct-to-Consumer & International from its 2012 launch as a joint programming output content partner with rival TV5 Network, Inc. until the former assumed the exclusive programming output content partner beginning in 2015).

=== July ===
- July 1 – K Movies Pinoy was officially launched of the 24/7 Filipino-dubbed Korean movie pay TV channel in the Philippines.
- July 18 - A bill extending the franchise granted to TV5 Network, Inc. has lapsed into law after President Rodrigo Duterte failed to act on the measure. TV5 Network, Inc., a subsidiary of MediaQuest Holdings under PLDT Beneficial Trust Fund that carries The 5 Network, granted an amendment of its congressional franchise under Republic Act No. 11320 (which previously Republic Act No. 7831), allowing TV5 to operate radio and television stations nationwide.
- July 28 – Zephanie Dimaranan won the first season of Idol Philippines held at the Newport Performing Arts Theater, Resorts World Manila.
- July 30 – Eat Bulaga!, the longest-running noontime show, celebrated its 40th year in Philippine television.
- July 31 – After 5 months and 13 days of initial and soft broadcast, One PH formally launched its official broadcast by Cignal TV being categorized into three blocks: NewsKom (News Komentaryo; newscasts and talk shows), KKK (Katarungan, Karapatan at Kaalaman; public service and infotainment) and SnS (Showbiz and Sports).

=== August ===
- August 4 – Yamyam Gucong of Bohol was hailed as the Pinoy Big Brother: Otso Ultim8 Big Winner held at the AATF Sports Complex in Imus, Cavite.
- August 8 – FPJ's Ang Probinsyano celebrated its record-breaking 1,000th episode on television.
- August 9 – Tonight with Boy Abunda celebrated its record-breaking 1,000th episode on television.
- August 10 – Jin Macapagal of Cebu City was hailed as the Ultimate BidaMan of It's Showtime's BidaMan: The Big Break held at the New Frontier Theater, Quezon City, Metro Manila.
- August 19 – UNTV (owned by Progressive Broadcasting Corporation), along with its sister channel, Truth Channel (owned by the Members Church of God International), have switched its airing of aspect ratio format quality on the channel feed and its programming to high-definition (16:9) as being converted its mitigation of reception through digital signal reception through free TV and cable and satellite providers and other digital platforms after 20 years and eight months on the usage of broadcast video picture resolution that migrated from standard-definition (4:3). However, selected programs like Ang Dating Daan and Itanong mo Kay Soriano remain in standard-definition.

=== September ===
- September 1 – ABS-CBN Corporation extends again for the fourth time for the free trial broadcasts of additional digital terrestrial television channels available exclusively on ABS-CBN TV Plus, such as Asianovela Channel, Movie Central, Myx, Jeepney TV and O Shopping.
- September 12 – SBN migrated its broadcast signal reception to digital terrestrial transmission from switching off its analog frequency in nationwide areas after 27 years.
- September 15 – Kim de Leon and Shayne Sava of StarStruck hailed as the Ultimate Male and Female Survivors.
- September 16 – DZRJ 810 TeleRadyo officially launched, a digital terrestrial and cable service. All of DZRJ 810 AM simulcast programs are newly launched stand-alone digital and cable channel under test broadcast on RJ DigiTV sub-channel, and it is also available via SkyCable Channel 224 in Metro Manila.
- September 24 – The Filipino Channel celebrated its 25th anniversary on global television.
- September 25 – ABS-CBN Corporation jointly ventured with American production company, Electric Entertainment for producing an upcoming American TV series to be filmed entirely in the Philippines.
- September 28 – Elaine Duran from Butuan was hailed as It's Showtime's Tawag ng Tanghalan Year 3 Grand Champion. It was held at Caloocan Sports Complex, Bagumbong, Caloocan.
- September 30 – Easy TV Home, a freemium digital TV subscription service, has ceased its commercial operations while only with free-to-air programming channels will continue after that date.

=== October ===
- October 1
  - After long years of broadcast coverage, Solar Entertainment Corporation has ceased broadcast of the following channels: Basketball TV and NBA Premium TV as the contract with the National Basketball Association expires on that date. ABS-CBN Sports and Fox Sports terminated their contracts with the association after 8 years of broadcasts. After the closure of both networks and the expiration of the Solar/ABS-CBN/FNG contracts, the NBA announced that some games during the 2019–20 season would be streamed live on Facebook and Twitter while the TV broadcast deal is still on hold. Later in November, the NBA has announced that the Nine Media Corporation will assumed the free-to-air television rights for these games during the regular season thru CNN Philippines (which the network's license holder WarnerMedia News & Sports held the U.S. cable rights to the NBA); marking the return of the NBA on RPN Channel 9 since the 2010–11 season. Other BTV programs (including the National Basketball League, the Women's National Basketball League, and Liga ACB) were migrated to Solar Sports except for the EuroLeague which has been transferred to TAP Sports 1.
  - Intercontinental Broadcasting Corporation celebrated its 60th anniversary of broadcasting on Philippine television.
- October 1–31 – It's Showtime, ABS-CBN's hit noontime variety show, celebrated its 10th year in Philippine television dubbed as "Sampu-sample". The program relaunched the classic Showtime format, Sine Mo ‘To, Ansabe and AdVice Ganda.
- October 2 – A massive fire occur inside the Star City theme park in Pasay, where it affected the offices of Manila Broadcasting Company which the radio stations disrupting its regular programming and knocking DZRH News Television (and its radio counterpart) off-the-air which the television viewers lost the channel for cable and satellite providers. Meanwhile, the FM stations and Radyo Natin broadcasts were moved to the alternate studio.
- October 5 - Eat Bulaga! held a world record in the segment Bawal Kumurap Nakamamatay Ng Swerte!, wherein Dabarkads Paolo Ballesteros didn't blink his eye for 1 hour, 17 minutes and 3 seconds, making it a world record for a Philippine television program.
- October 11 - ANC Headlines celebrated its 20th anniversary on Philippine television.
- October 13 - "Mabagal", a song entry composed by Dan Martel Simon Tañedo and interpreted by Daniel Padilla and Moira Dela Torre was named as Himig Handog 2019 grand winner held at ABS-CBN. This was aired on ABS-CBN's "ASAP Natin 'To".
- October 15
  - After 1 month of test broadcast, the DZRJ 810 AM simulcast channel officially metamorphosed as DZRJ 810 RadioVision available in all cable and digital providers, a cable TV and digital service. It will be the first news channel of the pay cable and digital service following the launch of the religious channel Oras ng Himala Channel in 2018, and the third channel to use following the launch of the music channel Rock of Manila TV in the previous month.
  - Rock of Manila TV officially soft-launched on all cable TV and Digital providers in the Philippines. It is owned by the Rajah Broadcasting Network.
  - Radio Philippines Network celebrated its 50th anniversary of broadcasting as a television network.
- October 26
  - Nicole Borromeo (from Cebu) was crowned as Miss Millennial Philippines 2019 of the noontime show, Eat Bulaga! held at the Meralco Theater.
  - J-Crisis (from Sampaloc, Manila) was hailed as the Classic Showtime 10th Anniversary Grand Champion of the noontime show, It's Showtime held at the Newport Performing Arts Theater, Resorts World Manila.
  - Team Vice with Miss Q and A Queens was hailed as Magpasikat 2019 Grand Champion of the noontime show, It's Showtime held at Newport Performing Arts Theater, Resorts World Manila.

=== November ===
- November 1 – Apple TV+, a streaming service owned by Apple Inc., was launched and became available in the Philippines, alongside in about 100 countries.
- November 3 – Vanjoss Bayaban, coached by Sarah Geronimo, won the fourth season of The Voice Kids, the grand finals of which were held at the Newport Performing Arts Theater, Resorts World Manila.
- November 6 – Knowledge Channel celebrates on its 20th year on free-to-air and pay digital television with the theme, "Ang Saya Matuto!".
- November 7 – Kapuso Mo, Jessica Soho celebrated its 15th year in Philippine television.
- November 9 – Ethel Booba from General Santos emerged as the first-ever Tawag ng Tanghalan Celebrity Grand Champion.
- November 19 – The Letran Knights clinched the NCAA Season 95 men's basketball title after defeating their archrivals San Beda Red Lions 2–1 in winner take-all game 3 of the best-of-three finals series held at the SM Mall of Asia Arena in Bay City, Pasay. This was their 18th basketball championship title since they last won in 2015.
- November 20 – The Ateneo Blue Eagles wins the UAAP Season 82 men's basketball championship title after defeating the UST Growling Tigers 2–0 in a best-of-three series. This was their 3rd consecutive title and also the first men's basketball team in UAAP history to pose a 16–0 season win sweep record.
- November 23
  - Paul Maawa of Lucena, Quezon emerged as Mister Q & A 2019.
  - The NU Lady Bulldogs wins the UAAP Season 82 women's basketball championship title after defeating the UST Tigresses 2–0 in a best-of-three series. This was their 6th consecutive title and also their perfect 16–0 win-loss record.
- November 30 – December 11 – All Philippine TV networks had its special coverage of the 2019 Southeast Asian Games.

=== December ===
- December 1 – ABS-CBN Corporation extends again for the fifth time for the free trial broadcasts of additional digital terrestrial television channels available exclusively on ABS-CBN TV Plus, such as Asianovela Channel, Movie Central, Myx, Jeepney TV and O Shopping.
- December 3 – HBO Go, a video-on-demand streaming service owned by Home Box Office, Inc. (operated as a unit of WarnerMedia), was launched and became available in the Philippines.
- December 6 - Since 1999, Unang Hirit celebrates on its 20th year of long-running morning newscast show on Philippine television.
- December 15 – Jeremiah Tiangco won the second season of The Clash.
- December 21 – Mark Michael Garcia from Malabon emerged as the first-ever TNT All-Star Grand Resbak Champion.

=== Unknown (dates) ===
- August – iQiYi, an online video platform owned by Baidu, was expanded its service worldwide including the Philippines.
- August–October – ABS-CBN launches the Kapamilya Love Weekend, a special public service event held in 65 barangays (villages) all over the Philippines. The Kapamilya Love Weekend is a combination of various public services, such as DZMM Kapamilya Day (Metro Manila and Luzon), ABS-CBN TLC (Teaching, Learning and Caring) (Metro Manila and Luzon), ABS-CBN Handog sa Kapamilya (North Luzon), ABS-CBN Grand Halad sa Kapamilya (Cebu), ABS-CBN Serbisyo Patrol (Davao), and Barangay Kapamilya (various areas) with various Kapamilya stars, DZMM anchors, and local personalities. It is organized by the network, in cooperation with ABS-CBN Foundation, ABS-CBN News and ABS-CBN Regional, as it continues to celebrate its 65th year in Philippine television.
- POP TV Pte. Ltd. launched a mass market video-on-demand service, "POPTV", and began its soft operations which include a wide variety of library contents from the local entertainment, as well as Tagalized versions of an international hits.
- TAP Digital Media Ventures Corporation launched "TAP Go", an over-the-top content and video-on-demand platform that carried some programming contents from movies, shows and sports, as well as livestreaming of its owned TV channels.

== Debuts ==
=== ABS-CBN ===
The following are programs that debuted on ABS-CBN:

- January 7: Minute to Win It: Last Man Standing (season 2)
- January 12: World of Dance Philippines (season 1)
- January 21: The General's Daughter
- March 10: G Diaries Season 3: Quest for Love
- March 25: Nang Ngumiti ang Langit
- March 30: DocuCentral Presents
- April 21: Hiwaga ng Kambat and Idol Philippines (season 1)
- April 27: Kuha Mo!
- April 29: Sino ang Maysala?
- May 1: #NoFilter
- May 3: Local Legends
- May 19: Teenage Mutant Ninja Turtles (season 4)
- August 3: The Voice Kids (season 4)
- August 5: Encounter and Gangnam Beauty
- August 10: I Can See Your Voice (season 2)
- August 11: iWant Originals
- August 12: The Killer Bride
- September 8: Parasite Island
- September 9: Pamilya Ko
- September 14: Coke Studio Philippines (season 3)
- September 15: G Diaries Season 4: Share The Love
- September 29: Kapamilya Super Blockbusters
- September 30: Codename: Terrius and Sandugo
- October 7: 100 Days My Prince and Starla
- October 14: Buenos Días Zamboanga (ABS-CBN Zamboanga)
- October 21: I Have a Lover
- November 9: The Misery Index and Your Moment
- November 18: Hotel del Luna
- November 25: Touch Your Heart
- December 8: The Haunted
- December 16: Maupay nga Aga Kapamilya (ABS-CBN Tacloban)

==== Re-runs ====
- January 6: One-Punch Man (season 1)^{1}
- April 7: My Hero Academia (season 1)^{1}
- July 14: Superbook Reimagined (season 4)
- July 20: Honey, Watch Out!
- December 22: The Loud House^{1}

Notes
^ ^{1} Originally aired on Yey!

=== GMA ===
The following are programs that debuted on GMA Network:

- January 7: Whisper
- January 19: Yo-Kai Watch: The Movie
- January 27: The Boobay and Tekla Show
- January 28: Cheese in the Trap and Fire of Eternal Love
- February 4: TODA One I Love
- February 11: Bangkok Love Stories Presents: Charming Girl and Inagaw na Bituin
- February 18: Kara Mia
- February 25: Hiram na Anak
- March 2: One Piece Movie: Gold
- March 4: Dragon Lady
- March 18: Sahaya
- March 25: My Sassy Girl and The Shannara Chronicles
- April 1: Bihag
- April 6: One Piece Film: Z
- April 8: The Crown Princess
- April 22: Love You Two
- April 29: Wolfblood (season 3)
- May 6: Love in Trouble
- May 20: Alex & Amie and Dahil sa Pag-ibig (2019)
- May 27: Are You Human?, Pokémon the Series: XYZ (season 19) and Ugly Duckling
- May 29: Queen of Mystery
- June 1: Detective Conan: Episode 1
- June 10: Home Foodie (season 5)
- June 15: StarStruck (season 7)
- July 1: Aladdin: You Would've Heard the Name and The Better Woman
- July 6: Detective Conan (season 7) and One Piece Movie: Episode of Alabasta
- July 8: Mars Pa More and U-Prince Presents
- July 15: Emperor: Ruler of the Mask
- July 22: Hanggang sa Dulo ng Buhay Ko
- August 3: Agripreneur and One Piece Movie: Episode of Chopper
- August 5: Fairy Tail (season 5)
- August 19: Prima Donnas (season 1)
- September 2: Mr. Sunshine and Wagas
- September 7: One Piece Movie: Giant Mecha Soldier of Karakuri Castle
- September 9: Beautiful Justice
- September 16: The Gift
- September 21: The Clash (season 2)
- September 30: One of the Baes
- October 5: Toppstar TV (season 2)
- October 7: Madrasta
- October 14: Invincible Teacher (season 2)
- October 21: Magkaagaw and Pokémon the Series: Sun & Moon (season 20)
- November 4: Sky Castle
- November 11: Fairy Tail (season 6)
- November 18: Taste of Love
- December 14: Pororo, The Racing Adventure
- December 16: Love Alert
- December 18: Wicked Angel

==== Re-runs ====
- February 2: Ben 10: Alien Force^{2} and Cardcaptor Sakura^{1}^{3}
- February 16: My Little Pony: Friendship Is Magic
- February 25: Ben 10 (2005)^{2}^{6}^{7} and Bleach (season 1)
- April 21/December 1: Yo-kai Watch (season 3)
- June 2: Tobot (seasons 1 to 3)
- June 3: Jackie Chan Adventures^{1}^{5}
- July 20: Ben 10 (2016)
- November 2: Bleach (season 1)
- November 23: Ben 10: Ultimate Alien^{2}
- December 9: Knockout^{8}

Notes
^ ^{1} Originally aired on ABS-CBN
^ ^{2} Originally aired on 5
^ ^{3} Originally aired on Q (now GMA News TV)
^ ^{4} Originally aired on 9TV (now CNN Philippines)
^ ^{5} Originally aired on Jack TV
^ ^{6} Originally aired on CNN Philippines
^ ^{7} Originally aired on C/S (now CNN Philippines)
^ ^{8} Originally aired on TeleAsia Filipino (now defunct)

=== 5 (The 5 Network) ===
The following are programs that debuted on 5:

- January 8: The Flash (season 4)
- January 12: Time Out
- January 13: Sine Squad Sunday
- January 15: Goldie & Bear and The Lion Guard
- January 19: Sine Squad Saturday
- January 20: #TolWagTroll - Respeto Lang: Rap Debattle
- January 24: Shop TV
- February 3: Balwarte 2019
- February 8: Scorpion (season 2)
- February 10: Aja Aja Tayo! (season 2)
- February 12: Aplikante Sa Senado
- February 16: Chooks-to-Go Pilipinas 3x3
- March 4: Agenda with Cito Beltran and The Big Story
- April 21: UFC Fight Night
- May 6: Mickey and the Roadster Racers
- May 19: This is Our Team
- June 8: Thunderbird Sabong Nation
- June 9: StePBAack
- June 23: Ultimate Boxing Series
- July 29: Hokkaido Travel Show
- August 5: Motorcity
- August 26: Morning Calls (Radyo5/One PH simulcast) and The Chiefs
- August 31: Ride PH
- September 7: Totoo Lunas
- September 21: Jumpball
- September 23: One Balita (One PH simulcast), One Balita Pilipinas, Primetime Megahits and Wag Po!
- September 24: Sine Spectacular
- September 28: Saturday Night Specials and Turbo Time
- September 29: Sunday Film Festival
- November 17: Kuwentong Sibol
- November 18: Playground and This is Our Team: SEA Games

==== Re-runs ====
- March 18: Randy Cunningham: 9th Grade Ninja
- April 1: Wander Over Yonder
- May 6: Doc McStuffins
- July 1: Elena of Avalor
- July 22: Kick Buttowski: Suburban Daredevil
- September 23: Kidlat and The Flash (seasons 3 and 4)
- September 24: Kapitan Awesome
- October 5: History with Lourd
- October 21: Demolition Job
- October 26: #ParangNormal Activity and Third Eye
- November 11: Henry Hugglemonster
- November 18: Cassandra: Warrior Angel
- November 25: Enchanted Garden
- December 16: Star Confessions
- December 28: Ang Utol Kong Hoodlum and For Love or Money
- December 29: Pinoy Samurai

=== PTV ===
The following are programs that debuted on People's Television Network:

- January 27: Saludo: Pagpupugay sa Bayaning Pilipino and Tinig ng Marino
- February 18: Amazing Human Powers
- February 23: Magandang Gabi Pilipinas with Caesar Soriano and TNT: Tara, Negosyo Tayo!
- February 24: Isyu One-on-One with Caesar Soriano
- February 25: A Look at Nature & Microworlds
- March 15: Gokui: Chasing the Dream
- March 18: 10 Minutes of Science
- March 19: Wonderful Science
- March 30: United Colors of Cosplay
- May 5: Sacred Monuments of Asia
- May 6: DILG: Tayo Na!
- May 11: Japan in Focus
- May 19: The Digital Comic Encyclopedia
- May 27: Resilaence Against Disaster
- June 2: Traditional Japanese Culture
- June 4: The Beauties of Nature
- June 15: Totoo Lunas
- June 16: One One Earth
- July 1: All About Rice
- July 7: Republic of Seniors
- July 11: DIGONG 8888 Hotline
- July 14: Dagyaw
- July 15: #Cooltura
- August 12: Unlad Pilipinas
- October 5: Lutong-Luto
- November 4: Make and Play
- November 5: Whiz Bang Science
- November 16: Ani at Kita
- November 18: Sulong Pilipinas!
- November 24: Alagang Magaling and Farm Living
- November 25: Passport on Wheels
- December 7: Kain Na!
- December 12: Gramo

=== IBC ===
The following are programs that debuted on IBC:

- January 27: CBA - Pilipinas
- February 4: Power to Unite with Elvira
- February 11: Iskoolmates and Public Eye
- February 17: Mula sa Edukador
- February 18: Chinese News TV (CNTV)
- February 25: Tutok 13
- March 2: Talents Academy
- March 4: Bukas May Kahapon
- March 9: SMAC Pinoy Ito!
- March 19: OOTD: Opisyal of the Day
- March 22: Tilaok TV
- April 29: My Ultimate Modelo 2019
- April 30: #Cooltura (new episodes)
- July 12: Artista Teen Quest 2019
- August 11: Kaibigan Special Sunday
- August 22: Arnelli in da Haus
- September 7: Bitag and Totoo Lunas
- October 3: PNA Newsroom
- October 12: ATC E-Sports Highlights and Pros & Cons with Usec. Joel Sy Egco
- October 19: Pare Kuys
- December 15: Consumer's Desk

==== Re-runs ====
- February 11: Hapi House!, Retro TV, Sic O'Clock News and T.O.D.A.S.

=== Minor networks ===
The following are programs that debuted on minor networks:

- January 6: The Privilege Card on RJ DigiTV
- February 5: Bravo Executive Lounge on RJ DigiTV
- February 11: EZ Shop on RJ DigiTV
- February 18: Agila Pilipinas on Net 25
- March 4: Bangon Na Pilipinas and Edge TV on Light TV
- April 2: The Awesome Life on Light TV
- May 5: Derek Prince Ministries on Light TV
- May 15: Bless Pilipinas on Light TV
- August 11: Negosyo Asenso Atbp. on Net 25
- September 1: Manibela on UNTV
- September 29: Siklista Ako TV on Light TV
- October 5: UCAPehan on Light TV
- December 2: Christmas from the Heart 2019 on SMNI

=== Other channels ===
The following are programs that debuted on other channels:

- January 1: Myx Daily Top 10 on Myx
- January 2: Revenge Body with Khloé Kardashian (season 1) on Metro Channel
- January 5: The Fairly OddParents (season 10) on Yey!
- January 6: ASAP Natin 'To: Encore on Jeepney TV
- January 9: WWE SmackDown on One Sports
- January 10: WWE Bottom Line on One Sports
- January 12: Drop the Mic (season 1) on Jack TV
- January 13: Penn & Teller: Fool Us (season 3) on Jack TV
- January 13: EZ Shop, U.S. NCAA Women's Volleyball, Road to The Nationals and World of X Games on 5 Plus
- January 14: eGG Network, High Noon and U.S. NCAA Women's Gymnastics Championships on 5 Plus
- January 15: The Good Place (season 3) on ETC
- January 18: Asian Tour on 5 Plus
- January 19: Buhay OFW on 5 Plus
- January 20: The F Word USA on ETC
- January 21: The Mighty B! on Yey!
- January 23: The Bold Type (season 2) on ETC
- January 28: Will You Marry Me? on Sari-Sari Channel
- January 28: The Stray Cat on Telenovela Channel
- January 28: U.S. NCAA Swimming and Diving Championships on 5 Plus
- January 29: Jumpball on PBA Rush
- February 1: U.S. NCAA Ice Hockey Championships on 5 Plus
- February 3: Glory Kickboxing on One Sports
- February 9: Celebs Go Dating (season 1) on ETC
- February 11: U.S. NCAA Women's College Basketball on 5 Plus
- February 15: Glory Kickboxing on 5 Plus
- February 17: Magsasaka TV on DZMM TeleRadyo
- February 17: Cage Warriors on One Sports
- February 18: Aksyon, Aksyon Solusyon, Alagang Kapatid, BolJak, Cristy Ferminute, Early All Ready with Cheryl Cosim & Orly Mercado, Morning Calls, One Balita, Panahon.TV, Perfect Morning with Cheryl Cosim, Relasyon, Sa Totoo Lang, Wag Po! and Wanted sa Radyo on One PH
- February 19: Politics as Usual on CNN Philippines
- February 21: Survivor: Edge of Extinction on Jack TV
- February 23: Balita Alas-Singko, Healing Galing sa Radyo5, Love Idol, Metro Sabado, The Chasedown Live, Oplan Asenso, Power and Play, Showbiz FM and Tech Sabado on One PH
- February 24: Talking Heads with Rose Solangon on 5 Plus
- February 24: Cyrus vs. Cyrus: Design and Conquer on ETC
- February 24: Aksyon Sports, Chink Positive, Iba 'Yung Pinoy, Perfect Morning with Mon Gualvez and Word of God Network on One PH
- February 25: Jack's Playlist on Jack TV
- February 25: Tomorrow, With You on Asianovela Channel
- February 27: Model Squad on Metro Channel
- March 4: American Idol (season 17) on ETC
- March 10: Chicken Talk and Family TV Mass on 5 Plus
- March 13: Revenge Body with Khloé Kardashian (season 1) on ETC
- March 13: Marrying My Daughter Twice on GMA News TV
- March 14: Get a Room with Carson and Thom on Metro Channel
- March 17: The Final Pitch (season 3) on CNN Philippines
- March 17: Cosplay Melee on Jack TV
- March 18: That Man Oh Soo on Asianovela Channel
- March 23: Hip Hop Squares (season 2) on Jack TV
- March 23: Are You the One? (season 6) on ETC
- March 24: The Nationals on 5 Plus
- March 24: LWYD Loving What You Do on GMA News TV
- March 24: Pinoy, Panalo Ka! on DZMM TeleRadyo
- March 25: Goodbye Mr. Black on Asianovela Channel
- March 25: Ghost Adventures on Sari Sari Channel
- April 3: The Awesome Life on GMA News TV
- April 8: DocuCentral Presents on ANC
- April 10: DocuCentral Presents on Jeepney TV
- April 13: Myx VJ Search 2019 on Myx
- April 13: Backyard Envy on ETC
- April 15: Gangaa, Lies of the Heart and Twist of Fate on Zee Sine
- April 17: Celebrity Undercover Boss on Jack TV
- April 22: Haikyu!! (season 3) on Yey!
- April 29: Because This Is My First Life on Asianovela Channel
- April 29: One Newsroom and Rush on One News
- April 29: Team Yey! (season 4) on Yey!
- April 30: Cuerpo y Alma on Sari-Sari Channel
- May 1: #NoFilter on DZMM TeleRadyo
- May 3: Kuha Mo! and Local Legends on DZMM TeleRadyo
- May 6: Kuha Mo! on Jeepney TV
- May 8: Local Legends on Jeepney TV
- May 9: #NoFilter on ANC and Jeepney TV
- May 11: Drop the Mic (season 2) on Jack TV
- May 14: Jane the Virgin (season 1) on ETC
- May 14: When a Snail Falls in Love on GMA News TV
- May 20: The Good Wife on Asianovela Channel
- May 20: Chicago Fire (season 5) on Jack TV
- May 26: Top Chef Junior (season 1) on ETC
- May 26: Fit in the City on One News
- May 27: Doraemon (2005) on Yey!
- June 3: Las Amazonas, The Three Sides of Ana and Unforgivable on Telenovela Channel
- June 4: Kay Susan Tayo! sa Super Radyo DZBB and Melo del Prado sa Super Radyo DZBB (Dobol B sa News TV) on GMA News TV
- June 8: DZBB Super Serbisyo, I'm Ready sa DZBB, Isyu Atbp., Pinoy M.D. sa Super Radyo DZBB, Super Balita sa Umaga Weekend and Super Radyo Nationwide Kasama si Melo del Prado on (Dobol B sa News TV) on GMA News TV
- June 9: Buena Manong Balita (Dobol B sa News TV), Dobol B: Bantay Balita sa Kamera (Dobol B sa News TV), Dobol B: Bantay Balita sa Senado (Dobol B sa News TV), Glow Up, Liwanang sa Balita (Dobol B sa News TV), MMDA sa GMA (Dobol B sa News TV) on GMA News TV
- June 9: Penn & Teller: Fool Us (season 4) on Jack TV
- June 15: Ben & Lauren: Happily Ever After? on ETC
- June 22: Good Job on DZMM TeleRadyo
- June 23: Siyensikat on GMA News TV
- June 24: Hana Nochi Hare on Asianovela Channel
- June 24: O Shopping on S+A
- June 26: Destiny Guard on Sari-Sari Channel
- June 29: Power Rangers Dino Charge on Yey!
- July 1: Mag-Badyet Tayo! on One PH
- July 2: Inay Ko Po! on One PH
- July 3: Superstore (season 3) on Jack TV
- July 3: Kwentong Kutsara on One PH
- July 4: Clinica Flavier on One PH
- July 5: Usapang Kapa-ted on One PH
- July 6: Get Out of My Room on ETC
- July 8: Inazuma Eleven GO: Chrono Stone on Yey!
- July 10: Revenge Body with Khloé Kardashian (season 2) on ETC
- July 13: Catching Kelce on ETC
- July 15: Something in the Rain on Asianovela Channel
- July 18: Suits (season 9) on Jack TV
- July 22: Sweet Home Oklahoma (season 1) on ETC
- July 22: The Kasambahays 2 on Sari-Sari Channel
- July 24: So You Think You Can Dance USA (season 14) on Jack TV
- July 27: GMA Regional TV Weekend News and World-Class Kababayan on GMA News TV
- July 29: Stand for Truth on GMA News TV
- July 29: Faney Avenue on Asianovela Channel
- August 3: Face Off (season 13: Battle Royale) on Jack TV
- August 3: Broken Skull Challenge (season 1) on Solar Sports
- August 4: Top Chef Junior (season 2) on ETC
- August 6: Jane the Virgin (season 2) on ETC
- August 6: Making It (season 1) and The 100 (season 5) on Jack TV
- August 11: Mr. Robot (season 3) on Jack TV
- August 12: Chicago Fire (season 6), Superstore (season 4) and The Biggest Loser (season 17: Temptation Nation) on Jack TV
- August 12: Naruto: Shippuden (season 9) on Yey!
- August 18: Ultimate Fighting Championship on Fox Sports Asia
- August 19: Sweet Home Oklahoma (season 2) on ETC
- August 19: A Not So Fake Love Story on Sari-Sari Channel
- August 26: Mother on Asianovela Channel
- August 31: Ride PH on One News
- September 1: Myx Most Viewed on Myx
- September 2: Pinoy Myx Breakout on Myx
- September 6: 2019 NFL season on 5 Plus and One Sports
- September 7: One Up on 5 Plus
- September 7: Power Rangers Dino Super Charge on Yey!
- September 9: The Liar and His Lover on GMA News TV
- September 9: One Balita Pilipinas on One PH
- September 9: The Neighbor on Telenovela Channel
- September 10: Legacies (season 1) and The Ellen DeGeneres Show season 17 on ETC
- September 15: Musiko on INC TV
- September 16: Inazuma Eleven GO: Galaxy on Yey!
- September 22: The Final Pitch (season 4) on CNN Philippines
- September 23: Wikaharian on Knowledge Channel
- September 23: Passion and Power on Telenovela Channel
- September 26: Survivor: Island of the Idols on Jack TV
- September 28: Beh Buti Nga! on Sari-Sari Channel
- September 29: Off-Court Battle on CNN Philippines
- September 30: Cheongdam-dong Scandal on Asianovela Channel
- October 2: DiscoverEats (season 3) on Colours
- October 5: Celebs Go Dating (season 2) on ETC
- October 6: Toppstar TV (season 2) on GMA News TV
- October 7: Elementary (season 6) on Jack TV
- October 7: Yu-Gi-Oh! Arc-V (season 2) on Yey!
- October 9: Great Big Story on CNN Philippines
- October 12: Eucharistia: Pananalangin at Pag-aaral on GMA News TV
- October 12: World of Dance USA (season 1) on Myx
- October 12: Broken Skull Challenge (season 2) on Solar Sports
- October 14: Shimmer and Shine on Yey!
- October 15: Jane the Virgin (season 3) on ETC
- October 19: Beyblade Burst on Yey!
- October 21: Care Bears: Unlock the Magic and Naruto: Shippuden (season 10) on Yey!
- October 21: Two Cops on Asianovela Channel
- October 28: Around the Horn and Pardon the Interruption on 5 Plus
- October 30: The Good Manager on GMA News TV
- November 2: Thank God It's the Weekend on CNN Philippines
- November 3: I Heart PH on CNN Philippines
- November 4: Asian Weekday Movie Fest and Mama Fairy and the Woodcutter on Asianovela Channel
- November 4: TMZ on TV on ETC
- November 9: Power Rangers Ninja Steel on Yey!
- November 10: The Healthy Juan (season 2) on GMA News TV
- November 11: Busina Balita on CNN Philippines
- November 12: Legacies (season 2) on ETC
- November 16: Kuwentong Sibol on 5 Plus
- November 16: Just Fur Babies on CNN Philippines
- November 16: Kaya Mo Yan on DZRH News Television
- November 24: Play is Work on 5 Plus
- December 9: Into the World Again on GMA News TV
- December 15: Gordon, Gino and Fred's Ultimate Road Trip on ETC
- December 16: Boruto: Naruto Next Generations (season 1) on Yey!
- December 23: Live Up to Your Name on Asianovela Channel

==== Re-runs ====
- January 7: Hwayugi: A Korean Odyssey on Asianovela Channel^{1}
- January 7: Your Face Sounds Familiar Kids (season 2) on Jeepney TV^{1}^{5}
- January 9: Royal Pains (season 8) on Jack TV ^{12}
- January 9: Naruto: Shippuden (season 6) on Yey!^{1}^{9}
- January 14: Lastikman on Jeepney TV^{1}^{5}
- January 16: Love O2O on GMA News TV^{2}
- January 21: A Love So Beautiful^{1}, Meteor Garden (2001)^{1}^{2}^{7}^{15} and Weightlifting Fairy^{1} on Asianovela Channel
- January 28: Wild at Heart on Telenovela Channel^{2}
- February 2: Adventure Time on CNN Philippines^{3}
- February 2: Halser Acre on Yey!
- February 4: Goblin^{1} and Signal^{4} on Asianovela Channel
- February 4: The Good Son and Wildflower on Jeepney TV^{1}
- February 4: Charlotte^{1} and Ni Hao, Kai-Lan on Yey!
- February 11: Doctor Crush on Asianovela Channel^{1}
- February 11: Let the Love Begin on Fox Filipino^{2}
- February 11: Pure Love (2014) on Jeepney TV^{1}
- February 11: Care Bears: Welcome to Care-a-Lot on Yey!^{16}
- February 18: Bubble Gum on Asianovela Channel
- February 18: The Best of Gandang Gabi, Vice^{1} and Komiks Presents: Wakasan^{1}^{5} on Jeepney TV
- February 18: Peter Pan and Wendy on Yey!^{1}^{14}
- February 23: Superbook Reimagined (season 1) on Yey!^{1}^{2}
- February 25: Uncontrollably Fond on Asianovela Channel
- February 25: Dong Yi on GMA News TV^{2}
- February 25: A Love to Last^{1}, Precious Hearts Romances Presents: Kristine^{1} and The Kids' Choice^{1}^{5} on Jeepney TV
- March 2: I Can See Your Voice (season 1) and Tanging Yaman on Jeepney TV^{1}
- March 4: Tayo the Little Bus and Yowamushi Pedal^{9} on Yey!
- March 9/September 9: Mako Mermaids (season 2) on GMA News TV^{2}
- March 11: Someone to Watch Over Me on Fox Filipino^{2}
- March 11: Magpahanggang Wakas on Jeepney TV^{1}
- March 16: Metal Fight Beyblade Zero G on Yey!
- March 18: Orange Marmalade^{4}^{7} and What's Wrong with Secretary Kim^{1} on Asianovela Channel
- March 18: Kung Ako'y Iiwan Mo on Jeepney TV^{1}
- March 18: Rascal the Raccoon and Remi, Nobody's Girl^{1} on Yey!
- March 24: Kakabakaba and Wolfblood (season 1) on GMA News TV^{2}
- March 25: The King is in Love on Asianovela Channel^{1}
- March 25: Be My Lady^{1}, Dance Kids^{1}^{5}, I Love OPM^{1}, Kambal sa Uma^{1} and Kokey^{1}^{5} on Jeepney TV
- March 25: Mr. Bean: The Animated Series^{1}^{3}^{14}, Naruto: Shippuden (season 7)^{1}^{9} and Yu-Gi-Oh! Arc-V (season 1)^{7}^{9} on Yey!
- March 30/October 5: One-Punch Man (season 1) on Yey!^{1}
- April 1: Precious Hearts Romances Presents: Bud Brothers on Jeepney TV^{1}
- April 8: Legend of the Blue Sea^{1} and The K2^{4}^{7} on Asianovela Channel
- April 15: Love in the Moonlight^{1}^{7} and Sensory Couple^{4}^{7} on Asianovela Channel
- April 15: Yagit (2014) on Fox Filipino^{2}
- April 15: Ina, Kapatid, Anak on Jeepney TV^{1}
- April 21: Magkaribal on Jeepney TV^{1}
- April 22: Doble Kara (book 2) and We Love OPM on Jeepney TV^{1}
- April 22: Cooking Master Boy on Yey!^{1}^{14}
- April 29: Bet on Your Baby^{1}, Kokey @ Ako^{1}^{5} and Maria Flordeluna^{1} on Jeepney TV
- May 1: UAAP Season 73 men's basketball tournament on Liga^{14}
- May 4: H_{2}O: Just Add Water on GMA News TV^{2}^{15}
- May 4: Agua Bendita on Jeepney TV^{1}
- May 5: Campus Romance on GMA News TV^{2}
- May 6: Palimos ng Pag-ibig on Jeepney TV^{1}
- May 11: May Minamahal on Jeepney TV^{1}
- May 13: My Dearest Intruder on Asianovela Channel^{1}
- May 13: Tanging Yaman on Jeepney TV^{1}
- May 20: Hwarang on Asianovela Channel^{1}
- May 20: Got to Believe on Jeepney TV^{1}
- May 27: I am Not a Robot^{1} and Woman with a Suitcase on Asianovela Channel
- May 27: Iisa Pa Lamang and May Bukas Pa (2009) on Jeepney TV^{1}
- June 3: Dear Friend and Reel Love Presents Tween Hearts on GMA News TV^{2}
- June 3: Two Wives (2014) on Jeepney TV^{1}
- June 3: Naruto: Shippuden (season 8)^{1}^{9} and Samurai X^{1}^{9}^{14}^{15} on Yey!
- June 8: Inday Will Always Love You on GMA News TV^{2}
- June 8: Ningning on Jeepney TV^{1}
- June 9: Karelasyon on GMA News TV^{2}
- June 10: Go Back Couple^{1}, Oh! My Lady^{7} and W^{1} on Asianovela Channel
- June 10: Imortal on Jeepney TV^{1}
- June 15: Since I Found You on Jeepney TV^{1}
- June 24: Mulawin vs. Ravena on Fox Filipino^{2}
- July 1: Heard It Through the Grapevine^{7} and Weightlifting Fairy^{1} on Asianovela Channel
- July 1: Angelito: Batang Ama and Crazy for You on Jeepney TV^{1}
- July 4: America's Next Top Model (cycle 23) on Metro Channel^{10}
- July 8: My Time with You on Asianovela Channel^{1}
- July 8: Pilipinas Got Talent (season 6) on Jeepney TV^{1}
- July 15: Black^{1} and Mask^{7} on Asianovela Channel
- July 22: My Dear Heart and Precious Hearts Romances Presents: Impostor on Jeepney TV^{1}
- August 3: Little Big Shots (season 1) on Jeepney TV^{1}^{5}
- August 5: Encantadia (2016) on Fox Filipino^{2}
- August 5: Sana Maulit Muli on Jeepney TV^{1}
- August 5: Max Steel (2013; season 1) on Yey!^{1}
- August 11: The Better Half on Jeepney TV^{1}
- August 12: My Love Donna^{1} and Signal^{4} on Asianovela Channel
- August 12: The Legal Wife on Jeepney TV^{1}
- August 18: Car Matchmaker (season 3) on Jack TV
- August 19: It Might Be You, Minsan Lang Kita Iibigin and Precious Hearts Romances Presents: Paraiso on Jeepney TV^{1}
- August 22: Pilipinas Got Talent (season 5) on Jeepney TV^{1}
- August 26: Doctor Crush on Asianovela Channel^{1}
- August 26: Dream Dad and Forevermore on Jeepney TV^{1}
- September 2: Meteor Garden II on Asianovela Channel^{1}^{2}^{15}
- September 2: Goin' Bulilit Classics, Princess and I, Rubi (2010) and The Best of MMK on Jeepney TV^{1}
- September 7: Nasaan Ka Nang Kailangan Kita on Jeepney TV^{1}
- September 9: Tomorrow, With You on Asianovela Channel
- September 16: What's Wrong with Secretary Kim on Asianovela Channel^{1}
- September 23: Hwayugi: A Korean Odyssey on Asianovela Channel^{1}
- September 23: Bagito on Jeepney TV^{1}
- October 7: Marriage Contract on GMA News TV^{2}
- October 7: Mirabella on Jeepney TV^{1}
- October 12: Starla Marathon on Yey!^{1}
- October 14: Goodbye Mr. Black and That Man Oh Soo on Asianovela Channel
- October 14: Mako Mermaids (season 3) on GMA News TV^{2}
- October 14: Pilipinas, Game Ka Na Ba? and Walang Hanggan (2012) on Jeepney TV^{1}
- October 16: Angelito: Ang Bagong Yugto on Jeepney TV^{1}
- October 19: The Greatest Love on Jeepney TV^{1}
- October 21: Bridges of Love on Jeepney TV^{1}
- November 4: Case Solved on Fox Filipino^{2}
- November 4: Alien Surf Girls on GMA News TV^{2}
- November 4: The Singing Bee (seasons 6 and 7) on Jeepney TV^{1}
- November 9: Ngayon at Kailanman (2018) on Jeepney TV^{1}
- November 11: Ang Kwarto sa May Hagdanan (season 2)^{8} and Strawberry Lane^{2} on Fox Filipino
- November 11: Precious Hearts Romances Presents: Midnight Phantom on Jeepney TV^{1}
- November 11: Ace of Diamond (season 1) on Yey!
- November 18: Because This Is My First Life and The Good Wife on Asianovela Channel
- November 18: Dugong Buhay on Jeepney TV^{1}
- November 18: Oddbods on Yey!^{3}
- November 25: Oh My G!, Pangako Sa 'Yo (2015), Prinsesa ng Banyera and World of Dance Philippines (season 1) on Jeepney TV^{1}
- December 2: Meteor Garden (2018) on Asianovela Channel^{1}
- December 2: Precious Hearts Romances Presents: Pintada and Sana Bukas pa ang Kahapon on Jeepney TV^{1}
- December 2: America's Next Top Model (cycle 24)^{10} and Best Bars in America (season 2)^{13} on Metro Channel
- December 9: Aliados on GMA News TV^{2}
- December 9: All of Me and Ikaw Ay Pag-Ibig on Jeepney TV^{1}
- December 16: Una Kang Naging Akin on Fox Filipino^{2}
- December 30: Encounter and Gangnam Beauty on Asianovela Channel^{1}
- December 30: Eva Fonda and The Blood Sisters on Jeepney TV^{1}
- Notes
1. ^ ^{a} Originally aired on ABS-CBN
2. ^ ^{b} Originally aired on GMA
3. ^ ^{c} Originally aired on 5
4. ^ ^{d} Originally aired on Cine Mo!
5. ^ ^{e} Originally aired on Yey!
6. ^ ^{f} Originally aired on S+A
7. ^ ^{g} Originally aired on Jeepney TV
8. ^ ^{h} Originally aired on Sari-Sari Channel
9. ^ ^{i} Originally aired on Hero (now defunct)
10. ^ ^{j} Originally aired on ETC
11. ^ ^{k} Originally aired on Jack TV
12. ^ ^{l} Originally aired on 2nd Avenue (now defunct)
13. ^ ^{m} Originally aired on CT (now defunct)
14. ^ ^{n} Originally aired on Studio 23 (now S+A)
15. ^ ^{o} Originally aired on Q (now GMA News TV)
16. ^ ^{p} Originally aired on 9TV (now CNN Philippines)

=== Video streaming services ===
The following are programs that debuted on video streaming services:

- January 5: HIGH on iWant
- January 20: Ultimate Fighting Championship on Fox+
- January 23: HUSH on iWant
- February 15: ZEKElingMagingSHEILA: The Zeke and Sheila's Almost Love Story on iWant
- February 16: Project Feb 14 on iWant
- March 6: Touch Screen on iWant
- April 14: Jhon en Martian on iWant
- May 31: Past, Present, Perfect? on iWant
- July 17: Ang Babae sa Septic Tank 3: The Real Untold Story of Josephine Bracken on iWant
- July 26: Mga Batang Poz on iWant
- August 18: Call Me Tita on iWant
- September 25: Taiwan That You Love on iWant
- October 5: Hinahanap-Hanap Kita on iWant
- October 11: Kargo on iWant
- December 16: Manilennials on iWant
- December 20: Uncoupling on iWant
- December 27: Story of My Life on iWant

== Returning or renamed programs ==
=== Major networks ===
| Show | Last aired | Retitled as/Season/Notes | Channel | Return date |
|---|---|---|---|---|
| Minute to Win It | 2017 (season 1: "Last Man Standing") | Same (season 2: "Last Man Standing") | ABS-CBN | January 7 |
| Philippine Basketball Association | 2018 (season 43: "Governors' Cup") | Same (season 44: "Philippine Cup") | 5 / PBA Rush | January 13 |
| Balwarte | 2016 | Same (2019 Mid-Term Elections edition) | 5 | February 3 |
| Scorpion | 2017 | Same (season 2) | 5 | February 8 |
| Aja Aja Tayo! | 2018 | Same (season 2) | 5 | February 10 |
| G Diaries | 2018 | Same (season 3: Quest For Love and season 4: Share the Love) | ABS-CBN | March 3 (season 3); September 15 (season 4) |
| Pinoy Idol | 2008 (GMA) | Idol Philippines | ABS-CBN | April 21 |
| Wolfblood | 2018 | Same (season 3) | GMA | April 29 |
| Pluma | 2018 | Same (season 4) | ABS-CBN | May 5 |
| Teenage Mutant Ninja Turtles | 2018 | Same (season 4) | ABS-CBN | May 19 |
| Philippine Basketball Association | 2018 (season 44: "Philippine Cup") | Same (season 44: "Commissioner's Cup") | 5 / PBA Rush | May 19 |
| Dahil sa Pag-ibig | 2012 (ABS-CBN) | Same (2019) | GMA | May 20 |
| Home Foodie | 2018 | Same (season 5) | GMA | June 10 |
| StarStruck | 2015 | Same (season 7) | GMA | June 15 |
| Chooks-to-Go Pilipinas 3x3 | 2019 | Same (Inaugural season) | 5 | June 16 (Patriot's Cup); September 1 (Magiting Cup) |
| Detective Conan | 2018 | Same (season 7) | GMA | July 6 |
| Mars | 2019 (GMA News TV) | Mars Pa More | GMA | July 8 |
| 30 for 30 | 2019 | Same | 5 | July 29 |
| Boxing's Greatest Fights | 2019 | Same | 5 | July 30 |
| The Voice Kids | 2016 | Same (season 4) | ABS-CBN | August 3 |
| Fairy Tail | 2016 | Same (seasons 5 and 6) | GMA | August 5 (season 5); November 11 (season 6) |
| I Can See Your Voice | 2019 | Same (season 2) | ABS-CBN | August 10 |
| Coke Studio Philippines | 2018 | Same (season 3) | ABS-CBN | September 14 |
| Philippine Basketball Association | 2018 (season 44: "Commissioner's Cup") | Same (season 44: "Governors' Cup") | 5 / PBA Rush | September 20 |
| The Clash | 2018 | Same (season 2) | GMA | September 21 |
| Toppstar TV | 2019 | Same (season 2) | GMA / GMA News TV | October 5 |
| Invincible Teacher | 2018 | Same (season 2) | GMA | October 14 |

=== State-owned networks ===
| Show | Last aired | Retitled as/Season/Notes | Channel | Return date |
|---|---|---|---|---|
| Chinese News TV (CNTV) | 2019 (Net 25) | Same | IBC | February 25 |
| Cooltura | 2012 | Same (new season / #Cooltura) | IBC | April 30 |
| SMAC Pinoy Ito! | 2019 | Same (season 2) | IBC | July 6 |
| Tilaok TV | 2019 | Same (season 2) | IBC | August 25 |

=== Minor networks ===
| Show | Last aired | Retitled as/Season/Notes | Channel | Return date |
|---|---|---|---|---|
| Manibela | 2016 | Same | UNTV | September 1 |
| UNTV Cup | 2019 | Same (season 8) | UNTV | September 9 |
| CBA - Pilipinas | 2019 (IBC) | Same (2019–20 season) | Light TV | November 9 |

=== Other channels ===
| Show | Last aired | Retitled as/Season/Notes | Channel | Return date |
|---|---|---|---|---|
| ASAP: Encore | 2018 | ASAP Natin 'To: Encore | Jeepney TV | January 6 |
| Royal Pains | 2018 | Same (season 8) | Jack TV | January 9 |
| The Good Place | 2018 | Same (season 3) | ETC on SBN | January 15 |
| The Bold Type | 2018 | Same (season 2) | ETC on SBN | January 23 |
| PBA D-League | 2018 (AksyonTV / PBA Rush; season 7: "Foundation Cup") | Same (season 8: "Aspirants' Cup") | 5 Plus / PBA Rush | February 14 |
| Philippine Super Liga | 2018 (season 6: "All-Filipino Conference") | Same (season 7: "Grand Prix Conference") | 5 Plus / One Sports | February 16 |
| UAAP Men's & Women's Volleyball | 2018 | Same (season 81) | S+A | February 16 |
| Sa Totoo Lang | 2018 (PTV) | Same | One PH | February 18 |
| UAAP Men's Football | 2018 | Same (season 81) | S+A | February 21 |
| Survivor | 2018 (season 37: "David vs. Goliath") | Same (season 38: "Edge of Extinction") | Jack TV | February 21 |
| American Idol | 2018 | Same (season 17) | ETC on SBN / Jack TV (episode 1 and finale episode only) | March 4 |
| The Final Pitch | 2018 | Same (season 3) | CNN Philippines | March 17 |
| Are You the One? | 2018 | Same (season 6) | ETC on SBN | March 23 |
| Haikyu!! | 2017 | Same (season 3) | Yey! | April 22 |
| Team Yey! | 2018 | Same (season 4) | Yey! | April 29 |
| Filoil Flying V Preseason Premier Cup | 2018 (5) | Same (2019 season) | 5 Plus | May 5 |
| Drop the Mic | 2019 | Same (season 2) | Jack TV | May 11 |
| Philippine Super Liga | 2019 (season 7: "Grand Prix Conference") | Same (season 7: "Beach Volleyball Challenge Cup") | 5 Plus / One Sports | May 16 |
| Spikers' Turf | 2018 (season 3: "Open Conference") | Same (season 4: "Reinforced Conference") | One Sports | May 19 |
| Chicago Fire | 2019 | Same (season 5) | Jack TV | May 20 |
| Women's National Basketball Association | 2018 | Same (2019 season) | S+A (Free-to-Air, all games including the playoffs and the finals) / Basketball TV / NBA Premium TV (Cable, all games including quarterfinals and semifinals, until September 25) | May 25 |
| Premier Volleyball League | 2018 (season 2: "Open Conference") | Same (season 3: "Reinforced Conference") | Liga / S+A | May 26 |
| Doraemon | 2016 (GMA) | Same (2005) | Yey! | May 27 |
| Kay Susan Tayo! | 2009 (GMA) | Kay Susan Tayo! sa Super Radyo DZBB | GMA News TV | June 4 |
| Penn & Teller: Fool Us | 2019 | Same (season 4) | Jack TV | June 9 |
| Maharlika Pilipinas Basketball League | 2019 | Same (2019–20 season) | S+A | June 12 (Lakan Cup) |
| Philippine Super Liga | 2019 (season 7: "Beach Volleyball Challenge Cup") | Same (season 7: "All-Filipino Conference") | 5 Plus / One Sports | June 15 |
| O Shopping | 2014 | Same | S+A | June 24 |
| Power Rangers | 2015 (ABS-CBN; season 18: "Megaforce") | Same (season 19: "Dino Charge") | Yey! | June 29 |
| Superstore | 2019 | Same (season 3) | Jack TV | July 3 |
| National Collegiate Athletic Association | 2018 | Same (season 95) | Liga / S+A | July 7 |
| Inazuma Eleven GO | 2017 (season 1) | Same (season 2: "Chrono Stone") | Yey! | July 8 |
| Revenge Body with Khloé Kardashian | 2019 | Same (season 2) | ETC on SBN | July 10 |
| Suits | 2019 | Same (season 9) | Diva / Jack TV | July 18 |
| Saturday Night Live | 2018 | Same (season 43) | Jack TV | July 19 |
| PBA D-League | 2019 (season 8: "Aspirants' Cup") | Same (season 8: "Foundation Cup") | 5 Plus / PBA Rush | July 26 |
| Face Off | 2019 (season 12: "Divide & Conquer") | Same (season 13: "Battle Royale") | Jack TV | August 3 |
| Top Chef Junior | 2019 | Same (season 2) | ETC on SBN | August 4 |
| Jane the Virgin | 2019 | Same (season 2) | ETC on SBN | August 6 |
| The 100 | 2017 | Same (season 5) | Jack TV | August 6 |
| Mr. Robot | 2017 | Same (season 3) | Jack TV | August 11 |
| Premier Volleyball League | 2019 (season 3: "Reinforced Conference") | Same (season 3: "Open Conference") | Liga / S+A | August 11 |
| Chicago Fire | 2019 | Same (season 6) | Jack TV | August 12 |
| Superstore | 2019 | Same (season 4) | Jack TV | August 12 |
| The Biggest Loser USA | 2017 (2nd Avenue; season 16: "Glory Days") | Same (season 17: "Temptation Nation") | Jack TV | August 12 |
| Naruto: Shippuden | 2016 (ABS-CBN) / 2017 (Hero) | Same (season 9) | Yey! | August 12 |
| Spikers' Turf | 2019 (season 4: "Reinforced Conference") | Same (season 4: "Open Conference") | One Sports | August 20 |
| Sweet Home Oklahoma | 2019 | Same (season 2) | ETC on SBN | August 26 |
| University Athletic Association of the Philippines | 2018 | Same (season 82) | Liga / S+A | September 1 |
| Universities and Colleges Basketball League | 2018 (AksyonTV) | Same (season 4) | Solar Sports | September 5 |
| National Football League | 2019 (5) | Same (2019 season) | 5 Plus / One Sports | September 6 |
| Power Rangers | 2019 (season 19: "Dino Charge") | Same (season 19: "Dino Super Charge") | Yey! | September 7 |
| The Ellen DeGeneres Show | 2019 | Same (season 17) | ETC on SBN | September 10 |
| Inazuma Eleven GO | 2019 (season 2: "Chrono Stone") | Same (season 3: "Galaxy") | Yey! | September 16 |
| The Final Pitch | 2019 | Same (season 4) | CNN Philippines | September 22 |
| Philippine Super Liga | 2019 (season 7: "All-Filipino Conference") | Same (season 7: "Invitational Conference") | 5 Plus / One Sports | September 24 |
| Survivor | 2019 (season 38: "Edge of Extinction") | Same (season 39: "Island of the Idols") | Jack TV | September 26 |
| DiscoverEats | 2018 | Same (season 3) | Colours | October 2 |
| Celebs Go Dating | 2019 | Same (season 2) | ETC | October 5 |
| Elementary | 2018 | Same (season 6) | Jack TV | October 7 |
| Yu-Gi-Oh! Arc-V | 2016 (Hero) / 2018 (Jeepney TV) | Same (season 2) | Yey! | October 7 |
| Jane the Virgin | 2019 | Same (season 3) | ETC | October 15 |
| Naruto: Shippuden | 2019 | Same (season 10) | Yey! | October 21 |
| TMZ on TV | 2018 | Same | ETC | November 4 |
| U.S. NCAA Men's College Basketball | 2019 (5) | Same (2019–20 season) | 5 Plus | November 6 |
| Power Rangers | 2019 (season 19: "Dino Super Charge") | Same (season 20: "Ninja Steel") | Yey! | November 9 |
| The Healthy Juan | 2019 | Same (season 2: "Labanan ang Infectious Diseases" and "Kalusugan, Kabuhayan, Kapaligiran") | GMA News TV | November 10 ("Labanan ang Infectious Diseases"); November 11 ("Kalusugan, Kabuhayan, Kapaligiran") |
| Legacies | 2019 | Same (season 2) | ETC | November 12 |
| National Basketball Association | 2019 (ABS-CBN / S+A / Basketball TV / NBA Premium TV) | Same (2019–20 season) | CNN Philippines | November 16 |

== Programs transferring networks ==
=== Major networks ===
| Date | Show | No. of seasons | Moved from | Moved to |
|---|---|---|---|---|
| January 6 | One-Punch Man | 1 | Yey! | ABS-CBN |
| February 2 | Cardcaptor Sakura | —N/a | ABS-CBN / Q (now GMA News TV) | GMA |
| February 2 | Ben 10: Alien Force | —N/a | 5 | GMA |
| April 7 | My Hero Academia | 1 | Yey! | ABS-CBN |
| April 21 | Idol Philippines | —N/a | GMA (as Pinoy Idol) | ABS-CBN (as Idol Philippines) |
| May 20 | Dahil sa Pag-ibig | —N/a | ABS-CBN | GMA (as a remake) |
| June 8 | Thunderbird Sabong Nation | —N/a | S+A | 5 |
| July 8 | Mars | —N/a | GMA News TV (as the original title) | GMA (as Mars Pa More) |
| August 3 | Agripreneur | —N/a | GMA News TV | GMA |
| August 31 | Ride PH | —N/a | GMA News TV | 5 / One News |
| September 2 | Wagas | —N/a | GMA News TV | GMA |
| November 23 | Ben 10: Ultimate Alien | —N/a | 5 | GMA |
| December 22 | The Loud House | —N/a | Yey! | ABS-CBN |

=== State-owned networks ===
| Date | Show | No. of seasons | Moved from | Moved to |
|---|---|---|---|---|
| January 27 | Tinig ng Marino | —N/a | UNTV | PTV |
| February 18 | Chinese News TV (CNTV) | —N/a | Net 25 | IBC |
| February 23 | Magandang Gabi Pilipinas with Ceasar Soriano | —N/a | Inquirer 990 Television | PTV |
| February 24 | Isyu One-on-One with Ceasar Soriano | —N/a | Inquirer 990 Television | PTV |
| July 7 | Republic of Seniors | —N/a | GMA News TV | PTV |
| September 7 | Bitag | —N/a | PTV | IBC |
| October 12 | Pros & Cons with Usec. Joel Sy Egco | —N/a | PTV | IBC |
| November 24 | Alagang Magaling | —N/a | 5 | PTV |

=== Minor networks ===
| Date | Show | No. of seasons | Moved from | Moved to |
|---|---|---|---|---|
| September 7 | Kasangga Mo ang Langit | —N/a | PTV | RJ DigiTV |
| September 7 | Biyaheng Langit | —N/a | PTV | RJ DigiTV |
| November 9 | CBA - Pilipinas | —N/a | IBC | Light TV |

=== Other channels ===
| Date | Show | No. of seasons | Moved from | Moved to |
|---|---|---|---|---|
| January 14 | eGG Network | —N/a | BEAM TV (as a digital sub-channel) | 5 Plus (as a segment block) |
| January 14 | High Noon | —N/a | 5 | 5 Plus |
| January 19 | Buhay OFW | —N/a | AksyonTV (now 5 Plus) | 5 Plus |
| January 21 | Meteor Garden | —N/a | ABS-CBN / GMA / Q (now GMA News TV) / Jeepney TV | Asianovela Channel |
| January 28 | Corazón indomable | —N/a | GMA (as the original title) | Telenovela Channel (as Wild at Heart) |
| February 4 | Signal | —N/a | Cine Mo! | Asianovela Channel |
| February 11 | Doctor Crush | —N/a | ABS-CBN | Asianovela Channel |
| February 18 | Sa Totoo Lang | —N/a | PTV | One PH |
| February 23 | Superbook Reimagined | 1 | ABS-CBN | Yey! |
| February 24 | Talking Heads | —N/a | GMA News TV | 5 Plus |
| February 25 | Dong Yi | —N/a | GMA | GMA News TV |
| March 9 | Mako Mermaids | 2 | GMA | GMA News TV |
| March 10 | Chicken Talk | —N/a | IBC | 5 Plus |
| March 10 | Family TV Mass | —N/a | IBC | 5 Plus |
| March 15 | The Key of David | —N/a | PTV | CNN Philippines |
| March 18 | What's Wrong with Secretary Kim | —N/a | ABS-CBN | Asianovela Channel |
| March 24 | LWYD Loving What You Do | —N/a | PTV | GMA News TV |
| May 5 | Filoil Flying V Preseason Premier Cup | —N/a | 5 | 5 Plus |
| May 14 | Jane the Virgin | 1 | ABS-CBN / Jeepney TV (in Filipino dubbed) | ETC (in original English audio) |
| May 27 | Doraemon | —N/a | GMA (as the 1979 TV series) | Yey! (as the 2005 TV series) |
| June 4 | Kay Susan Tayo! | —N/a | GMA (as Kay Susan Tayo!) | GMA News TV (as Kay Susan Tayo! sa Super Radyo DZBB) |
| June 29 | Power Rangers | 19 | ABS-CBN | Yey! |
| July 4 | America's Next Top Model | 23 | ETC | Metro Channel |
| August 12 | Naruto: Shippuden | 9 | ABS-CBN / Hero (now defunct) | Yey! |
| August 12 | The Biggest Loser USA | 17 | 2nd Avenue (now defunct) | Jack TV |
| August 18 | Ultimate Fighting Championship | —N/a | 5 / AksyonTV (now 5 Plus) / Hyper (now One Sports) | Fox Sports |
| September 5 | Universities and Colleges Basketball League | 4 | AksyonTV (now 5 Plus) | Solar Sports |
| September 6 | National Football League | 100 | 5 | 5 Plus / One Sports |
| September 7 | Yu-Gi-Oh! Arc-V | 2 | Hero (now defunct) / Jeepney TV | Yey! |
| October 28 | Around the Horn | —N/a | 5 | 5 Plus |
| October 28 | Pardon the Interruption | —N/a | 5 | 5 Plus |
| November 6 | U.S. NCAA Men's College Basketball | —N/a | 5 | 5 Plus |
| November 16 | National Basketball Association | 74 | ABS-CBN / S+A / Basketball TV (now defunct) / NBA Premium TV (now defunct) | CNN Philippines |
| November 18 | Oddbods | 1 | 5 | Yey! |

=== Video streaming services ===
| Date | Show | No. of seasons | Moved from | Moved to |
|---|---|---|---|---|
| January 20 | Ultimate Fighting Championship | —N/a | 5 / AksyonTV (now 5 Plus) / Hyper (now One Sports) | Fox+ |

== Milestone episodes ==
The following shows made their Milestone episodes in 2019:

| Show | Network | Episode # | Episode title | Episode air date |
|---|---|---|---|---|
| Eat Bulaga! | GMA | 11,900th | "11,900th episode" | January 4 |
| It's Showtime | ABS-CBN | 2,900th | "#Showtime1stBiyernes2019" | January 4 |
| Ngayon at Kailanman (2018) | ABS-CBN | 100th | "Laban Bawi" | January 4 |
| Meteor Garden (2018) | ABS-CBN | 100th | "The UnF4gettable Finale" | January 4 |
| FPJ's Ang Probinsyano | ABS-CBN | 850th | "Salamat" | January 8 |
| Tonight with Boy Abunda | ABS-CBN | 850th | "Kyle Echarri Interview" | January 8 |
| Ika-5 Utos | GMA | 100th | "Usig" | January 17 |
| My Special Tatay | GMA | 100th | "Bistado" | January 18 |
| Royal Pains | Jack TV | 100th | "Doubt of Africa" | January 23 |
| The Tonight Show Starring Jimmy Fallon | Jack TV | 1,000th | "Molly Shannon/Robert Irwin" | January 24 |
| Wowowin | GMA | 800th | "#Wowowin" | January 25 |
| Playhouse | ABS-CBN | 100th | "Without A Doubt" | February 1 |
| Asawa Ko, Karibal Ko | GMA | 100th | "DNA" | February 14 |
| Kadenang Ginto | ABS-CBN | 100th | "Paglayo" | February 22 |
| Los Bastardos | ABS-CBN | 100th | "Sulyap" | March 1 |
| Onanay | GMA | 150th | "Pagbawi" | March 1 |
| Halik | ABS-CBN | 150th | "Rambulang Halik" | March 8 |
| FPJ's Ang Probinsyano | ABS-CBN | 900th | "Sinungaling" | March 19 |
| Tonight with Boy Abunda | ABS-CBN | 900th | "Mitch Talao Interview" | March 19 |
| My Special Tatay | GMA | 150th | "The Special Finale" | March 29 |
| Daig Kayo ng Lola Ko | GMA | 100th | "100th Episode" | March 31 |
| Tadhana | GMA | 100th | "Chop-chop" | April 27 |
| Kadenang Ginto | ABS-CBN | 150th | "Pagbubunyag" | May 3 |
| Los Bastardos | ABS-CBN | 150th | "Laro" | May 14 |
| FPJ's Ang Probinsyano | ABS-CBN | 950th | "Sapang Bato" | May 30 |
| Tonight with Boy Abunda | ABS-CBN | 950th | "Loisa Andalio Interview" | May 31 |
| The General's Daughter | ABS-CBN | 100th | "Kasado" | June 11 |
| Sunday PinaSaya | GMA | 200th | "Hataw sa Saya" | June 23 |
| Pepito Manaloto | GMA | 350th | "Smart Shoes" | June 29 |
| Dragon Lady | GMA | 100th | "Caught on Cam" | July 1 |
| Chicago Fire | Jack TV | 100th | "One Hundred" | July 1 |
| Kadenang Ginto | ABS-CBN | 200th | "Romina at Leon" | July 16 |
| Sarap, 'Di Ba? | GMA | 350th | "Gayang-gaya Kayang-kaya" | July 20 |
| Los Bastardos | ABS-CBN | 200th | "Giba" | July 24 |
| Sahaya | GMA | 100th | "Buong Pamilya" | August 7 |
| FPJ's Ang Probinsyano | ABS-CBN | 1,000th | "1000" | August 8 |
| Tonight with Boy Abunda | ABS-CBN | 1,000th | "Janella Salvador Interview" | August 9 |
| Nang Ngumiti ang Langit | ABS-CBN | 100th | "Alagang Mikmik" | August 14 |
| The General's Daughter | ABS-CBN | 150th | "Nakamasid" | August 20 |
| Love You Two | GMA | 100th | "Looking for Jake" | September 9 |
| Failon Ngayon | ABS-CBN | 500th | "500th Episode" | September 14 |
| Magandang Buhay | ABS-CBN | 900th | "KontrabiDad" | September 18 |
| Magpakailanman | GMA | 350th | "Ganti ng Beki" | September 21 |
| Kadenang Ginto | ABS-CBN | 250th | "Hinala" | September 24 |
| Dahil sa Pag-ibig (2019) | GMA | 100th | "Finale" | October 4 |
| Bubble Gang | GMA | 1,200th | "1200th Episode" | October 11 |
| The Bottomline with Boy Abunda | ABS-CBN | 500th | "Boy Abunda's Birthday Special (Part 1)" | October 12 |
| FPJ's Ang Probinsyano | ABS-CBN | 1,050th | "Plano" | October 17 |
| Tonight with Boy Abunda | ABS-CBN | 1,050th | "MC & Lassy Interview" | October 18 |
| Kadenang Ginto | ABS-CBN | 300th | "Higpitan" | December 3 |
| FPJ's Ang Probinsyano | ABS-CBN | 1,100th | "Balak" | December 26 |
| Tonight with Boy Abunda | ABS-CBN | 1,100th | "Ricci Rivero Interview" | December 27 |
| The Killer Bride | ABS-CBN | 100th | "Scared to Death" | December 27 |

== Finales ==
=== ABS-CBN ===
The following are programs that ended on ABS-CBN:

- January 4: Meteor Garden (2018)
- January 6: I Can See Your Voice (season 1)
- January 18: Ngayon at Kailanman (2018)
- March 22: Playhouse
- March 23: Pareng Partners
- March 31: One-Punch Man (season 1)
- April 13: DocuCentral Presents
- April 14: Wansapanataym and World of Dance Philippines season 1
- April 24: Red Alert
- April 26: Halik and TNT: Tapatan ni Tunying
- May 12: The Legend of Korra (seasons 3 and 4; rerun)
- May 17: News Patrol Kapampangan (ABS-CBN TV-46 Pampanga)
- July 7: My Hero Academia (season 1)
- July 13: Angel Wings
- July 28: Idol Philippines (season 1)
- August 2: Pinoy Big Brother: Otso Gold
- August 4: Goin' Bulilit and Pinoy Big Brother: Otso
- August 9: Sino ang Maysala?
- August 25: Hiwaga ng Kambat
- September 6: Minute to Win It: Last Man Standing (season 2)
- September 8: G Diaries Season 3: Quest for Love
- September 22: iWant Originals
- September 27: Precious Hearts Romances Presents: Los Bastardos and Encounter
- October 4: Gangnam Beauty and The General's Daughter
- October 18: Nang Ngumiti ang Langit
- November 2: Coke Studio Philippines (season 3)
- November 3: The Voice Kids (season 4)
- November 15: Codename: Terrius
- November 22: 100 Days My Prince
- December 1: Parasite Island
- December 15: Teenage Mutant Ninja Turtles (season 4)
- December 29: Superbook Reimagined (season 4; rerun)

==== Stopped airing ====
| Program | Last airing | Resumed airing | Reason |
|---|---|---|---|
| S.O.C.O.: Scene of the Crime Operatives | November 9 | November 23 | Program pre-empted by the UAAP Season 82 Men's Basketball Finals Game 1 wide coverage on November 16. |
| Kuha Mo! | November 9 | November 23 | Program pre-empted by the UAAP Season 82 Men's Basketball Finals Game 1 wide coverage on November 16. |

=== GMA ===
The following are programs that ended on GMA Network:

- January 4: Something About 1%
- January 12: Toppstar TV (season 1)
- January 25: Rakshasa Street and Whisper
- January 26: Grami's Circus Show (rerun)
- January 27: Ben 10 (2016)
- January 31: Waves of Life
- February 8: Don't Dare to Dream and Ika-5 Utos
- February 10: Sonic Boom
- February 15: Cain at Abel
- February 22: Bangkok Love Stories Presents: Charming Girl, Detective Conan season 6 (rerun), Yo-kai Watch (season 3)
- February 23: Yo-Kai Watch: The Movie
- March 2: Asawa Ko, Karibal Ko
- March 15: Onanay
- March 22: Cheese in the Trap and Fire of Eternal Love
- March 29: My Special Tatay
- March 30: One Piece Movie: GOLD
- April 4: My Golden Life
- April 14: Tobot (season 3)
- April 17: TODA One I Love
- April 26: The Shannara Chronicles (season 1)
- May 3: Hiram na Anak
- May 17: Bleach season 1 (rerun) and Inagaw na Bituin
- May 23: The Crown Princess
- May 24: Ben 10 (2005) and Wolfblood (season 3)
- May 25: One Piece Film: Z
- May 26: Pororo the Little Penguin
- May 28: My Sassy Girl
- May 31: Alex & Amie
- June 1: Light Up and Lifegiver
- June 2: Diyos at Bayan and Jesus the Healer
- June 28: Love in Trouble and Kara Mia
- June 29: Detective Conan: Episode 1
- June 30: Barangay 143 (season 1), Stories for the Soul and Yo-kai Watch (season 3; rerun)
- July 5: Queen of Mystery and Ugly Duckling
- July 11: Are You Human?
- July 14: Ben 10: Alien Force
- July 20: Dragon Lady
- July 27: One Piece Movie: Episode of Alabasta
- August 2: Pokémon the Series: XYZ
- August 16: Bihag
- August 29: Emperor: Ruler of the Mask
- August 30: Aladdin: You Would've Heard the Name (season 1)
- August 31: One Piece Movie: Episode of Chopper
- September 6: Home Foodie (season 5), Sahaya and U-Prince Presents
- September 13: Love You Two
- September 15: StarStruck (season 7)
- September 27: The Better Woman
- September 28: One Piece Movie: Giant Mecha Soldier of Karakuri Castle
- October 4: Dahil sa Pag-ibig (2019)
- October 11: Jackie Chan Adventures (rerun)
- October 13: Ben 10 (2016; rerun)
- October 18: Fairy Tail season 5
- October 19: Hanggang sa Dulo ng Buhay Ko
- October 20: Cardcaptor Sakura
- October 27: Thomas & Friends and Tobot (seasons 1 to 3; rerun)
- October 31: Mr. Sunshine
- November 10: Invincible Teacher season 2
- November 15: Wagas
- November 16: My Little Pony: Friendship Is Magic (rerun)
- November 24: Detective Conan season 7
- December 7: Studio 7 and Toppstar TV (season 2)
- December 8: Pokémon the Series: Sun & Moon
- December 13: Taste of Love
- December 15: The Clash (season 2)
- December 17: Sky Castle
- December 29: Sunday PinaSaya

==== Stopped airing ====
- November 24: The Atom Araullo Specials (reason: Program on series break. The program resumed on May 31, 2020.)

=== 5 (The 5 Network) ===
The following are programs that ended on 5:

- January 11: Ultimate Spider-Man (rerun)
- January 26: Time Out
- January 27: Sidecourt Chef
- February 4: 2018 NFL season
- February 7: The Flash season 4
- March 1: Aksyon Tonite
- March 10: The Chasedown
- March 15: Miles from Tomorrowland
- March 29: The Lion Guard
- April 27: From Helen's Kitchen
- April 28: #TolWagTroll - Respeto Lang: Rap Debattle
- May 3: Wander Over Yonder
- May 4: 2019 PSL Grand Prix Conference and Alagang Magaling
- May 5: Balwarte 2019
- May 7: Aplikante Sa Senado
- May 25: Goldie & Bear
- June 2: Aja Aja Tayo! (season 2)
- June 28: Mickey and the Roadster Racers
- July 12: Doc McStuffins (rerun) and Randy Cunningham: 9th Grade Ninja (rerun)
- July 19: Jake and the Never Land Pirates (rerun)
- July 20: Avengers Assemble (rerun)
- July 28: Shop TV
- August 2: Elena of Avalor (rerun)
- August 16: Hokkaido Travel Show
- August 27: 2019 PSL All-Filipino Conference
- August 30: Motorcity
- September 1: Ultimate Boxing Series
- September 15: Kuwentong Gilas
- September 20: Sine Squad
- September 21: Sine Squad Sabado
- September 22: Sine Squad Sunday and Chooks-to-Go Pilipinas 3x3
- October 19: Basketball Science and This is Our Team
- November 15: Kidlat (rerun)
- November 17: Kapitan Awesome (rerun)
- November 22: The Flash (season 4; rerun)
- November 27: StePBAack
- November 30: Playground and This is Our Team: SEA Games
- December 11: Kick Buttowski: Suburban Daredevil (rerun)
- December 15: Kuwentong Sibol and Shootaround
- December 20: Demolition Job (rerun)
- December 28: Heavy Hitters

==== Stopped airing ====
| Program | Stopped airing | Resumed airing | Reason |
|---|---|---|---|
| Around the Horn | January 11 | April 9 | Program on series break. |
| Around the Horn | August 31 | October 28 (on 5 Plus; now One Sports) | Program on series break. Moved to 5 Plus (now One Sports) on October 28. |
| High Noon | January 11 | January 14 (on 5 Plus; now One Sports) | Program on series break. Moved to 5 Plus (now One Sports) on January 14. |
| #TolWagTroll - Respeto Lang: Rap Debattle | February 3 | March 24 | Program replaced by the second season of Aja Aja Tayo! beginning February 10. Program returned on March 24. |
| Scorpion (season 2) | March 1 | Unknown | Program replaced by Agenda beginning March 4. |
| Boxing's Greatest Fights | March 1 | July 29 and 30 | Program on series break. Program resumed on July 29 and 30. |
| Boxing's Greatest Fights | August 22 | July 11, 2020 (on One Sports) | Program replaced by The Chiefs beginning August 26. Program moved to One Sports on July 11, 2020. |
| WWE Raw | May 7 | January 25, 2020 | Program on series break. Program resumed on January 25, 2020. |
| WWE SmackDown Live | May 8 | January 21, 2020 (on One Sports; now One Sports+) | Program on series break. Moved to One Sports (now One Sports+) on January 21, 2020. |
| 30 for 30 | August 23 | February 8, 2020 (on 5 Plus; now One Sports) | Program replaced by The Chiefs beginning August 26. Program resumed on 5 Plus (now One Sports) on February 8, 2020. |
| Basketball Almanac | August 31 | Program can still be seen on PBA Rush | ESPN5 shows prior to removal, replaced by Sine Squad movies and 2019 FIBA Basketball World Cup. However, the program can still be seen on PBA Rush. |
| Pardon the Interruption | August 31 | October 28 (on 5 Plus; now One Sports) | ESPN5 shows prior to removal, replaced by Sine Squad movies and 2019 FIBA Basketball World Cup. Program moved to 5 Plus (now One Sports) on October 28. |
| The Big Story | September 20 | Program can still be seen on One News | Program replaced by One Balita Pilipinas beginning September 23. However, the program will continued to air on One News. |
| Saturday Night Specials | October 19 | Unknown | Movie block replaced by #ParangNormal Activity and Third Eye reruns beginning October 26. The movie block is absorbed with the Primetime Megahits movie block. |

=== PTV ===
The following are programs that ended on People's Television Network:

- January 21: Marco Polo
- January 22: NHK Documentaries
- February 8: EZ Shop
- February 24: F Talk and Payo Alternatibo
- March 2: Usapang SSS and Yaman sa Kailaliman
- March 10: Sammy and Jimie
- March 17: The Doctor is ln Made More Fun (season 7)
- March 24: Saludo
- April 7: The Key of The David
- April 11: Bagong Bayani TV
- May 4: Sagisag Kultura TV
- May 19: Lumad TV
- May 24: Linya ng Pagbabago
- May 26: Salaam TV
- June 1: Crime Desk
- June 9: Sacred Monuments of Asia
- June 28: Resilinece Against Disaster
- June 30: Tinig ng Marino
- July 6: Bitag
- July 7: The Digital Comic Encyclopedia
- July 14: Buhay Pinoy
- August 30: Biyaheng Langit and Kasangga Mo ang Langit
- September 1: Talitha Kum Healing Mass on TV
- October 4: Pros & Cons with Usec. Joel Sy Egco
- November 4: #Cooltura
- November 6: Insider Exclusive Kapihan
- December 29: Ani at Kita

==== Stopped airing ====
- July 27: PCSO Lottery Draw (reason: temporary suspension of all PCSO lottery games due to alleged "massive" corruption. The program resumed on July 31.)

=== IBC ===
The following are programs that ended on IBC:

- February 11: News Team 13
- February 23: Chicken Talk
- March 3: Family TV Mass
- April 26: Bukas May Kahapon
- May 5: Mula sa Edukador
- May 9: OOTD: Opisyal of the Day
- May 31: My Ultimate Modelo 2019
- July 19: Hapi House! (rerun), Retro TV (rerun), Sic O'Clock News (rerun) and T.O.D.A.S. (rerun)
- August 5: Iskoolmates and Public Eye
- October 13: Kaibigan Special Sunday
- December 28: Artista Teen Quest 2019 and Pare Kuys
- December 29: SMAC Pinoy Ito!

=== Minor networks ===
- February 15: Chinese News TV (CNTV) on Net 25
- July 31: Responde: Tugon Aksyon Ngayon on Net 25
- August 3: Tribe on Net 25
- August 4: Bits 'N Pieces and RYTS: Rule Yourself to Success on Net 25
- November 29: News Light on Light TV
- December 28: UCAPehan on Light TV
- December 29: Young Once Upon a Time on Net 25

==== Unknown dates ====
- Hashtag Pinoy, In Touch with Dr. Charles Stanley, Pisobilities and The 700 Club Asia on Light TV
- Chinatown TV on Net 25

=== Other channels ===
- January 4: Black on Asianovela Channel
- January 4: Minute to Win It: Last Man Standing (season 1) on Jeepney TV
- January 6: Aksyon Sports, Chink Positive, Iba 'Yung Pinoy, Perfect Morning, Word of God Network and WWE Raw on AksyonTV
- January 8: Naruto: Shippuden (season 5) on Yey!
- January 9: Aksyon Solusyon on AksyonTV
- January 10: Aksyon, Alagang Kapatid sa Radyo5, Cristy FerMinute and Serbisyong Kapatid with Cheryl Cosim on AksyonTV
- January 11: 30 for 30, Aksyon Tonite, BolJak, Kwentong Gilas, Morning Calls, Orly at Laila: All Ready!, Orly Mercado: All Ready!, Relasyon, SportsCenter Philippines, Supergirl season 2 and Wanted sa Radyo on AksyonTV
- January 11: Galema: Anak ni Zuma (rerun) on Jeepney TV
- January 11: The Trapp Family Singers (rerun) on Yey!
- January 12: Balita Alas-Singko sa Radyo5, ESPN's Boxing Greatest Fights, Healing Galing sa Radyo5, Heavy Hitters, Love Idols, Metro Sabado, Oplan Asenso and Power and Play on AksyonTV
- January 13: Toppstar TV (season 1) on GMA News TV
- January 15: You're My Destiny on GMA News TV
- January 16: The Bold Type (season 1) on ETC
- January 18: Blood, Go Back Couple and Twenty Again on Asianovela Channel
- January 18: Harvey Beaks on Yey!
- January 19: The Proposal (season 1) on ETC
- January 19: Face Off season 12: Divide & Conquer on Jack TV
- January 25: Me, Myself & I on Jack TV
- January 25: Secrets at the Hotel on Telenovela Channel
- January 27: Konek Todo on DZMM TeleRadyo
- January 27: Journeys: Chronicles of Our Asian Century on Global News Network
- February 1: The Greatest Love on Jeepney TV
- February 1: Heard It Through the Grapevine and Unforgettable Love on Asianovela Channel
- February 8: Good Doctor on Asianovela Channel
- February 8: Buena Familia on Fox Filipino
- February 8: Apoy sa Dagat (rerun) on Jeepney TV
- February 9: Drop the Mic (season 1) on Jack TV
- February 10: Top Chef season 15 on ETC
- February 11: Banana Split: Extra Scoop on Jeepney TV
- February 15: Hwayugi: A Korean Odyssey on Asianovela Channel
- February 15: Project Runway All Stars season 6 on ETC
- February 21: Your Face Sounds Familiar Kids season 2 on Jeepney TV
- February 22: A Love So Beautiful (rerun) and Weightlifting Fairy (rerun) on Asianovela Channel
- February 22: Queen Seon-Deok on GMA News TV
- February 22: Precious Hearts Romances Presents: Bud Brothers (rerun) and Till I Met You on Jeepney TV
- February 23: Banana Sundae: Rescoop and Muling Buksan ang Puso (rerun) on Jeepney TV
- February 24: Home Along Da Riles (rerun) on Jeepney TV
- February 27: Chicago Fire season 4 and Royal Pains (season 8) on Jack TV
- February 28: Suits season 8 on Jack TV
- March 1: Inazuma Eleven GO season 1 (rerun) and Robocar Poli on Yey!
- March 2: Aliados on GMA News TV
- March 8: Ikaw Lang ang Iibigin on Jeepney TV
- March 8: Let the Love Begin on Fox Filipino
- March 10: BeyWarriors: Cyborg (rerun) on Yey!
- March 12: Love O2O on GMA News TV
- March 15: Goblin (rerun), Meteor Garden (2001) and Signal on Asianovela Channel
- March 15: Lastikman (rerun) and Maging Sino Ka Man (2006; rerun) on Jeepney TV
- March 15: Charlotte (rerun) and Peter Pan and Wendy (rerun) on Yey!
- March 22: Bubble Gum (rerun) and Doctor Crush on Asianovela Channel
- March 22: Aryana, Komiks Presents: Wakasan (rerun), The Kids' Choice and The Singing Bee (seasons 6 to 7) on Jeepney TV
- March 22: Simply María on Telenovela Channel
- March 22: Naruto Shippuden season 6 and Yu-Gi-Oh! 5D's season 1 on Yey!
- March 23: Crimson Girl on GMA News TV
- March 24: Cyrus vs. Cyrus: Design and Conquer on ETC
- March 27: The Bold Type (season 2) on ETC
- March 29: @ANCAlerts on ANC
- March 30: Buhay OFW on 5 Plus
- March 31: EZ Shop on 5 Plus
- April 3: This Is Us (season 3) on Iflix
- April 3: Pareng Partners on Jeepney TV
- April 5: The Good Place (season 3) on ETC
- April 5: Orange Marmalade (rerun) and Tomorrow, With You on Asianovela Channel
- April 5: Pareng Partners on DZMM TeleRadyo
- April 6: The F Word USA on ETC
- April 10: Revenge Body with Khloé Kardashian (season 1) on Metro Channel
- April 12: That Man Oh Soo and Uncontrollably Fond (rerun) on Asianovela Channel
- April 12: Someone to Watch Over Me on Fox Filipino
- April 12: Superstore (season 2) on Jack TV
- April 12: Pure Love (2014; rerun) on Jeepney TV
- April 14: Penn & Teller: Fool Us (season 3) on Jack TV
- April 17: Model Squad and Revenge Body with Khloé Kardashian (season 1) on Metro Channel
- April 18: DocuCentral Presents and I Love OPM on Jeepney TV
- April 20: DocuCentral Presents on DZMM Teleradyo
- April 21: Cosplay Melee on Jack TV
- April 24: Red Alert on DZMM Teleradyo
- April 26: What's Wrong with Secretary Kim on Asianovela Channel
- April 26: TNT: Tapatan ni Tunying on DZMM TeleRadyo
- April 26: Dance Kids and Kokey (rerun) on Jeepney TV
- April 26: Rush Hour on One News
- April 27: Reel Action Sabado on GMA News TV
- April 27: Tubig at Langis (rerun) on Jeepney TV
- April 28: Wolfblood (season 1) on GMA News TV
- April 28: One-Punch Man (season 1) (rerun) and Team Yey! (season 3) on Yey!
- April 29: TNT: Tapatan ni Tunying on Jeepney TV
- May 2: Red Alert on Jeepney TV
- May 3: Red Alert on ANC
- May 3: Magpahanggang Wakas on Jeepney TV
- May 3: Haikyu!! (season 3) on Yey!
- May 4: Tanging Yaman (rerun) on Jeepney TV
- May 5: Superbook Reimagined (season 1) on Yey!
- May 8: Revenge Body with Khloé Kardashian (season 1) on ETC
- May 9: Star (season 3) on Iflix
- May 10: Goodbye Mr. Black and The K2 (rerun) on Asianovela Channel
- May 10: Dong Yi on GMA News TV
- May 10: Precious Hearts Romances Presents: Bud Brothers (rerun) on Jeepney TV
- May 12: Dolce Amore (rerun) on Jeepney TV
- May 16: Survivor: Edge of Extinction on Jack TV
- May 16: The Good Son and We Love OPM on Jeepney TV
- May 17: The Big Bang Theory season 12 on Jack TV
- May 17: Legend of the Blue Sea (rerun) and The King is in Love (rerun) on Asianovela Channel
- May 19: Myx VJ Search 2019 on Myx
- May 20: American Idol season 17 on ETC
- May 24: Love in the Moonlight (rerun) and Sensory Couple (rerun) on Asianovela Channel
- May 24: Kokey @ Ako (rerun) and Palimos ng Pag-ibig on Jeepney TV
- May 24: Cooking Master Boy (rerun) on Yey!
- May 25: Celebs Go Dating (season 1) on ETC
- May 25: Day Off on GMA News TV
- May 27: Light Up on GMA News TV
- May 29: Midnight Prayer Helps on GMA News TV
- May 30: Taking Heads on GMA News TV
- May 31: Balita Pilipinas Ngayon, Japanese documentary in English and News to Go on GMA News TV
- May 31: The Best of Gandang Gabi, Vice on Jeepney TV
- May 31: Ask God for Forgiveness... Not Me and Fooled Into Love on Telenovela Channel
- May 31: Naruto: Shippuden season 7 and Yu-Gi-Oh! Arc-V season 1 (rerun) on Yey!
- June 1: Lifegiver, Mako Mermaids (season 2), River of Worship and The Awesome Life on GMA News TV
- June 1: Thunderbird Sabong Nation on S+A
- June 1: Metal Fight Beyblade Zero G (rerun) on Yey!
- June 2: Ang Mahiwagang Baul (rerun), Diyos at Bayan, Fantastikids (rerun), Jesus the Healer, Now Showing, One Day Isang Araw (rerun), Sunday Screening and Worship Word & Wonders on GMA News TV
- June 7: Because This Is My First Life, My Dearest Intruder (rerun) and Twenty Again (rerun) on Asianovela Channel
- June 7: Lobo (rerun) on Jeepney TV
- June 8: Haybol Pinoy on DZMM TeleRadyo
- June 8: Backyard Envy on ETC
- June 8: Drop the Mic (season 2) on Jack TV
- June 8: La Luna Sangre on Jeepney TV
- June 9: The Final Pitch (season 3) on CNN Philippines
- June 12: Jane the Virgin season 1 on ETC
- June 16: LWYD Loving What You Do on GMA News TV
- June 19: Celebrity Undercover Boss on Jack TV
- June 21: The Good Wife on Asianovela Channel
- June 21: Yagit (2014) on Fox Filipino
- June 27: Kung Ako'y Iiwan Mo (rerun) on Jeepney TV
- June 28: Hwarang (rerun) and Woman with a Suitcase (rerun) on Asianovela Channel
- June 28: A Love to Last (rerun) on Jeepney TV
- July 5: I am Not a Robot (rerun) on Asianovela Channel
- July 5: Wildflower on Jeepney TV
- July 6: Are You the One? season 6 on ETC
- July 10: Get a Room with Carson and Thom on Metro Channel
- July 12: Go Back Couple (rerun), Oh! My Lady (rerun) and W (rerun) on Asianovela Channel
- July 18: Agripreneur on GMA News TV
- July 18: Kambal sa Uma (rerun) on Jeepney TV
- July 19: Tanging Yaman (rerun) on Jeepney TV
- July 23: America's Next Top Model (cycle 23) on Metro Channel
- July 26: Hana Nochi Hare on Asianovela Channel
- July 26: The Stray Cat on Telenovela Channel
- July 27: Hip Hop Squares (season 2) on Jack TV
- July 28: Top Chef Junior (season 1) on ETC
- July 28: Fit in the City on One News
- August 1: Crazy for You (rerun) on Jeepney TV
- August 2: Mulawin vs. Ravena on Fox Filipino
- August 3: Ben & Lauren: Happily Ever After? on ETC
- August 4: Magkaribal (rerun) on Jeepney TV
- August 5: Chicago Fire season 5 on Jack TV
- August 7: Superstore season 3 on Jack TV
- August 9: My Time with You (rerun) ans Weightlifting Fairy (rerun) on Asianovela Channel
- August 9: Iisa Pa Lamang (rerun) on Jeepney TV
- August 9: Naruto: Shippuden season 8 on Yey!
- August 12: Sweet Home Oklahoma (season 1) on ETC
- August 15: Ina, Kapatid, Anak (rerun) on Jeepney TV
- August 16: Precious Hearts Romances Presents: Kristine (rerun) and Two Wives (2014; rerun) on Jeepney TV
- August 20: Making It (season 1) on Jack TV
- August 21: Pilipinas Got Talent season 6 on Jeepney TV
- August 23: Mask (rerun) and Something in the Rain on Asianovela Channel
- August 23: Be My Lady and Got to Believe (rerun) on Jeepney TV
- August 24: Get Out of My Room on ETC
- August 25: Mr. Robot (season 3) on Jack TV
- August 25: Top Chef Junior (season 2) on ETC
- August 27: 2019 PSL All-Filipino Conference on 5 Plus and One Sports
- August 28: Revenge Body with Khloe Kardashian (season 2) on ETC
- August 30: Heard It Through the Grapevine (rerun) on Asianovela Channel
- August 30: Saturday Night Live season 43 and The Biggest Loser season 17: Temptation Nation on Jack TV
- August 30: Dahil May Isang Ikaw (rerun), Doble Kara (book 2) and Maria Flordeluna (rerun) on Jeepney TV
- August 31: Catching Kelce on ETC
- August 31: Face Off season 13: Battle Royale on Jack TV
- August 31: Agua Bendita (rerun) on Jeepney TV
- September 1: Penn & Teller: Fool Us (season 4) on Jack TV
- September 1: Power Rangers Dino Charge on Yey!
- September 2: Superstore season 4 on Jack TV
- September 3: The Tonight Show Starring Jimmy Fallon on Jack TV
- September 6: Reel Love Presents Tween Hearts on GMA News TV
- September 6: Las Amazonas on Telenovela Channel
- September 8: Inside Edition on ETC
- September 8: Shop TV on GMA News TV
- September 8: Car Matchmaker (season 3; rerun) on Jack TV
- September 9: Sweet Home Oklahoma (season 2) on ETC
- September 13: My Love Donna (rerun) on Asianovela Channel
- September 13: Chicago Fire season 6 on Jack TV
- September 13: Inazuma Eleven GO: Chrono Stone on Yey!
- September 20: Sana Maulit Muli (rerun) on Jeepney TV
- September 20: Wild at Heart on Telenovela Channel
- September 26: Suits season 9 on Diva
- September 27: Mother and Signal (rerun) on Asianovela Channel
- September 28: Beauty and the Best on DZRH News Television
- September 29: Aksyon Bantay OFW, Tambayan Sessions and Thinking Out Loud on DZRH News Television
- October 1: I-Report: DZRH Interviews and Spotted with Rocky on DZRH News Television
- October 4: Doctor Crush (rerun) on Asianovela Channel
- October 4: The Liar and His Lover on GMA News TV
- October 4: May Bukas Pa (2009; rerun) on Jeepney TV
- October 4: Samurai X (rerun) on Yey!
- October 5: Broken Skull Challenge (season 1) on Solar Sports
- October 10: Pilipinas Got Talent season 5 on Jeepney TV
- October 11: Bet on Your Baby and Minsan Lang Kita Iibigin (rerun) on Jeepney TV
- October 11: Mako Mermaids (season 2; rerun) on GMA News TV
- October 12: Ningning (rerun) on Jeepney TV
- October 13: Chicken Talk on 5 Plus
- October 13: Off-Court Battle on CNN Philippines
- October 13: Pinoy, Panalo Ka! on DZMM TeleRadyo
- October 15: Angelito: Batang Ama (rerun) on Jeepney TV
- October 16: The Legal Wife (rerun) on Jeepney TV
- October 17: 2019 PSL Invitational Conference on 5 Plus and One Sports
- October 18: Tomorrow, With You (rerun) on Asianovela Channel
- October 18: Naruto: Shippuden season 9 on Yey!
- October 19: World-Class Kababayan on GMA News TV
- October 22: 2019 Spikers' Turf Open Conference on One Sports
- October 25: Meteor Garden II on Asianovela Channel
- October 29: Marriage Contract on GMA News TV
- October 29: Legacies (season 1) on ETC
- October 29: The 100 (season 5) on Jack TV
- October 30: So You Think You Can Dance USA (season 14) on Jack TV
- November 1: Faney Avenue, Hwayugi: A Korean Odyssey (rerun) and What's Wrong with Secretary Kim (rerun) on Asianovela Channel
- November 1: Mako Mermaids (season 3) on GMA News TV
- November 1: Dream Dad (rerun) on Jeepney TV
- November 2: Since I Found You on Jeepney TV
- November 3: One-Punch Man (season 1; rerun) and Power Rangers Super Dino Charge on Yey!
- November 7: Imortal (rerun) on Jeepney TV
- November 8: Encantadia (2016) on Fox Filipino
- November 8: Inazuma Eleven GO: Galaxy on Yey!
- November 15: Goodbye Mr. Black (rerun) and That Man Oh Soo (rerun) on Asianovela Channel
- November 15: Bagito (rerun) on Jeepney TV
- November 15: Ang Kwarto sa May Hagdanan (season 2; rerun) on Fox Filipino
- November 22: Be Careful With My Heart (rerun), Mirabella and Precious Hearts Romances Presents: Impostor on Jeepney TV
- November 28: Rubi (2010; rerun) on Jeepney TV
- November 29: Two Cops on Asianovela Channel
- November 29: Precious Hearts Romances Presents: Paraiso on Jeepney TV
- November 30: Broken Skull Challenge (season 2) on Solar Sports
- December 6: Alien Surf Girls and The Good Manager on GMA News TV
- December 6: Forevermore (rerun) and My Dear Heart (rerun) on Jeepney TV
- December 6: Yu-Gi-Oh! Arc-V season 2 on Yey!
- December 8: Toppstar TV (season 2) on GMA News TV
- December 13: Strawberry Lane on Fox Filipino
- December 13: Naruto: Shippuden season 10 on Yey!
- December 14: World of Dance USA season 1 on Myx
- December 15: The Final Pitch (season 4) on CNN Philippines
- December 18: DiscoverEars (season 3) on Colours
- December 19: Survivor: Island of the Idols on Jack TV
- December 20: The Good Wife (rerun) on Asianovela Channel
- December 20: America's Next Top Model (cycle 24) on Metro Channel
- December 27: Because This Is My First Life (rerun) and Mama Fairy and the Woodcutter on Asianovela Channel
- December 27: Bridges of Love (rerun), Precious Hearts Romances Presents: Midnight Phantom and World of Dance Philippines (season 1) on Jeepney TV
- December 28: Myx News and Rock Myx on Myx
- December 29: Gordon, Gino and Fred's Ultimate Road Trip on ETC
- December 30: Myx Throwback on Myx

==== Stopped airing ====
| Program | Channel | Stopped airing | Resumed airing | Reason |
|---|---|---|---|---|
| Be Careful With My Heart (rerun) | Jeepney TV | February 1 | May 19 and 20 | Program on series break. To be replaced with Wildflower as one of cast member is a candidate and part for an upcoming Philippine mid-term election period. Program resumed on May 19 and 20. |
| Love O2O | GMA News TV | February 11 | February 25 | Program pre-empted by The 700 Club Asia telethon special. Both programs resumed on February 25. |
| Crimson Girl | GMA News TV | February 11 | February 25 | Program pre-empted by The 700 Club Asia telethon special. Both programs resumed on February 25. |
| Palibhasa Lalake (rerun) | Jeepney TV | February 15 | Unknown | Program on series break. To be replaced with The Best of Gandang Gabi, Vice! as several cast members are the candidates and part for an upcoming Philippine mid-term election period. |
| Pilipinas, Game Ka Na Ba? (rerun) | Jeepney TV | March 22 | October 14 | Program on series break. To be replaced with Dance Kids as one of game show host is a candidate and part for an upcoming Philippine mid-term election period. Program resumed on October 14. |
| The Garfield Show | Yey! | March 22 | September 2 | Program on series break. To be replaced with Mr. Bean: The Animated Series on March 25. Program resumed on September 2. |
| Goin' Bulilit Classics (rerun) | Jeepney TV | March 29 | September 2 | Program on series break. To be replaced with Komiks Presents: Wakasan on morning timeslot as one of the cast is a candidate and part for an upcoming Philippine mid-term election period. Program resumed on September 2. |
| Marrying My Daughter Twice | GMA News TV | May 20 | September 21, 2020 (on Heart of Asia) | Program pre-empted by The 700 Club Asia telethon special. However, to be replaced with the rerun of GMA Public Affairs programs effective June 3 and later with Inday Will Always Love You (rerun) effective June 10. Program resumed airing on Heart of Asia beginning September 21, 2020. |
| Wagas | GMA News TV | May 25 | September 2 (on GMA Network) | Program on series break. Moved to GMA Network beginning September 2. |
| When a Snail Falls in Love | GMA News TV | May 31 | Unknown | Program replaced by Dear Friend (rerun) on June 3. |
| Mars | GMA News TV | May 31 | July 8 (on GMA Network; as Mars Pa More) | Program on series break. Moved to GMA Network and renamed as Mars Pa More on July 8. |
| The World of Gandang Ricky Reyes | GMA News TV | June 1 | June 23 | Program on series break. Program resumed on June 23. |
| H_{2}O: Just Add Water | GMA News TV | June 2 | Unknown | Program replaced by Inday Will Always Love You (rerun) on June 8. |
| I Can See Your Voice (season 1) | Jeepney TV | July 27 | August 10 (as the second-season premiere on ABS-CBN) | To be replaced with Little Big Shots as the second-season premiere on ABS-CBN beginning August 10. |
| Suits (season 9) | Jack TV | September 12 | The 3 remaining episodes continued on Diva | To be temporary replaced with the encore run of Celebrity Undercover Boss due to via satellite contractual dispute. However, the last three remaining episodes will continue on Diva. |

=== Video streaming services ===
- January 18: Alamat ng Ano on iWant
- January 19: The End on iWant
- January 25: The Good Place season 3 on Iflix
- February 16: Spirits: Reawaken on iWant
- February 23: HIGH on iWant
- March 1: ZEKElingMagingSHEILA: The Zeke and Sheila's Almost Love Story on iWant
- March 6: HUSH on iWant
- March 20: Touch Screen on iWant
- March 23: Project Feb 14 on iWant
- May 12: Jhon en Martian on iWant
- May 14: Arrow season 7 on HOOQ
- May 15: The Flash season 5 on Iflix/HOOQ
- May 20: Supergirl season 4 on HOOQ
- July 12: Past, Present, Perfect? on iWant
- August 28: Ang Babae sa Septic Tank 3: The Real Untold Story of Josephine Bracken on iWant
- August 30: Mga Batang Poz on iWant
- October 6: Call Me Tita on iWant
- October 30: Taiwan That You Love on iWant
- November 23: Hinahanap-Hanap Kita on iWant
- November 8: Kargo on iWant

== Networks ==
The following are a list of free-to-air and cable channels or networks launches and closures in 2019.

=== Launches ===
| Date | Station | Type | Channel | Source |
|---|---|---|---|---|
| January 1 | Da Vinci Kids | Cable and satellite | Sky Cable Channel 142 (Metro Manila) | |
| January 1 | Filmbox ArtHouse | Cable and satellite | Sky Cable Channel 83 (Metro Manila) | |
| February 18 | One PH | Cable and satellite | Cignal Channel 6 (Nationwide) | |
| April 16 | TAP Sports 1 | Cable and satellite | Sky Cable Channel 216 SD / Channel 264 HD (Metro Manila) | |
| April 16 | TAP Sports 2 | Cable and satellite | Sky Cable Channel 265 HD (Metro Manila) | |
| April 16 | TechStorm TV | Cable and satellite | Sky Cable Channel 212 (Metro Manila) | |
| June 16 | GINX Esports TV | Cable and satellite | Sky Cable Channel 213 (Metro Manila) | |
| July 1 | K Movies Pinoy | Cable and satellite | Sky Cable Channel 79 (Metro Manila); Cablelink Channel 44 (Metro Manila) | |
| July 1 | Paramount Channel | Cable and satellite | Sky Cable Channel 85 SD / Channel 263 HD (Metro Manila) | |
| August 10 | Motorvision TV | Cable and satellite | G Sat Channel 31 (Nationwide) | |
| August 10 | Pet & Pal | Cable and satellite | G Sat Channel 32 (Nationwide) | |
| August 10 | Luxe & Life | Cable and satellite | G Sat Channel 33 (Nationwide) | |
| August 10 | Health & Wellness | Cable and satellite | G Sat Channel 34 (Nationwide) | |
| August 10 | Sonlife Broadcasting Network | Cable and satellite | G Sat Channel 38 (Nationwide) | |
| August 10 | My Cinema Europe | Cable and satellite | G Sat Channel 84 (Nationwide) | |
| September 1 | Rock of Manila TV (now RJ Rock TV) | Broadcasting channel | Sky Cable & Destiny Cable Channel 229 (Metro Manila); Channel 29.4 (Metro Manila) | |
| October 15 | DZRJ 810 RadioVision (now Radyo Bandido TV) | Broadcasting channel | Sky Cable & Destiny Cable Channel 224 (Metro Manila); Channel 29.3 (Metro Manila) | |
| December 1 | One Movie (hook-up from Hollywood Movie Channel) | Cable and satellite | G Sat Channel 111 (Nationwide) | |

=== Stations changing network affiliation ===
The following is a list of television stations that have made or will make noteworthy affiliation switches in 2019.

| Date | Station | Channel | Prior affiliation | New affiliation | Notes | Source |
|---|---|---|---|---|---|---|
| June 4 | DZOE-TV | 11 | GMA News TV | silent | On April 24, GMA News TV's parent company GMA Network, Inc. and its Citynet Television subsidiary announced that they will terminating its lease blocktime programming and advertising sales agreement with DZOE-TV's parent company ZOE Broadcasting Network over its channel 11 license after 14 years along with the network's predecessor Q, when DZOE-TV will be go silent after 21 years of broadcasting. The network will moved to channel 27 (see the article below) as the parent company plans to bring back the channel 27 license after 12 years of hibernation from the airwaves (channel 27 frequency was previously held by the predecessor networks Citynet Television from its launch on August 27, 1995 until April 4, 1999, Entertainment Music Channel (EMC) from April to December 1999, and the second over-the-air iteration of Channel [V] Philippines from December 1999 until its July 25, 2001, closure, and also used as a relay to GMA Network In 2004 and then QTV from 2005 until its discontinuation In 2007). In anticipation of the moving of the news channel to their new channel number, its mother network had discontinued airing religious programs produced by Light TV during the weekend with the programs will continued to broadcast on the said network; leaving In Touch with Charles Stanley as the only religious program to carried on both networks, while The 700 Club Asia will be the only religious program to aired exclusively to its mother network (Except only for the show's live telethon specials which are airing on both networks). | |
| June 4 | DWDB-TV | 27 | GMA (DTT test broadcasts) | GMA News TV | | |

=== Rebranded ===
The following is a list of television stations or cable channels that have made or will make noteworthy network rebrands in 2019.

| Date | Rebranded from | Rebranded to | Type | Channel | Source |
|---|---|---|---|---|---|
| January 1 | MTVph | MTV Asia | Cable and satellite | Channel 22 (DTT); EasyTV Home Channel 4 (Metro Manila); Cablelink Channel 42 (Metro Manila); Cignal Channel 151 (Nationwide); Sky Cable Channel 71 (Metro Manila) | |
| January 9 | Hyper | One Sports | Cable and satellite | Cignal Channel 91 (SD) / Channel 261 (HD) (Nationwide); Cablelink Channel 100 (Metro Manila) | |
| January 13 | AksyonTV | 5 Plus | Broadcasting network | Channel 41 (analog feed); Cignal Channel 15 (Nationwide); SatLite Channel 6 (Nationwide); Sky Cable Channel 59 (Metro Manila); Cablelink Channel 11 (Metro Manila) | |
| February 1 | Global News Network | One Media Network | Cable and satellite | Selected terrestrial stations G Sat Channel 1 (Nationwide) | |
| April 1 | Channel NewsAsia | CNA | Cable and satellite | Cignal Channel 134 (Nationwide); Sky Direct Channel 51 (Nationwide); Sky Cable Channel 109 (Metro Manila); Cablelink Channel 21 (Metro Manila) | |
| November 29 | Asian Food Channel | Asian Food Network | Cable and satellite | SkyCable Channel 22 (SD) / Channel 248 (HD) (Metro Manila) & Channel 602 (SD) (Provincial); Cignal Channel 62 (Nationwide) | |

=== Closures ===
| Date | Station | Channel | Sign-on debut | Source |
|---|---|---|---|---|
| January 9 | Hyper | Cignal Channel 91 (SD) / Channel 261 (HD); Cablelink Channel 100 (Metro Manila) | April 14, 2012 | |
| January 12 | AksyonTV | Channel 41 (analog feed); Cignal Channel 6 (Nationwide); SatLite Channel 6 (Nationwide); Sky Cable Channel 59 (Metro Manila); Cablelink Channel 11 (Metro Manila) | February 21, 2011 | |
| January 31 | Global News Network | Selected terrestrial stations G Sat Channel 1 (Nationwide); Sky Cable Channel 213 (Metro Manila); Cablelink Channel 106 (Metro Manila) | March 1, 2008 | |
| April 1 | Gone Viral TV | EasyTV Home Channel 5 (Metro Manila) | May 25, 2018 | |
| June 1 | Sony Channel | Sky Cable Channel 35 (Metro Manila) / Channel 605 (Provincial); Cablelink Channel 39 (Metro Manila); Cignal Channel 120 (Nationwide); SatLite Channel 91 (Nationwide) | October 15, 2014 | |
| July 1 | fyi | Sky Cable Channel 79 (SD) / Channel 200 (HD) (Metro Manila); Cablelink Channel 44 (Metro Manila) | October 6, 2014 | |
| August 1 | beIN Sports 3 | Sky Cable Channel 206 (HD) (Metro Manila); Cignal Channel 94 (Nationwide) | October 15, 2013 | |
| August 16 | Boo | Channel 30 (DTT); EasyTV Home Channel 15 (Metro Manila) | May 25, 2018 | |
| October 1 | Basketball TV | Channel 21 (DTT); EasyTV Home Channel 5 (Metro Manila); Sky Cable Channel 33 (Metro Manila) / Channel 302 (Provincial); Cablelink Channel 60 (Metro Manila); Cignal Channel 95 (Nationwide); SatLite Channel 52 (Nationwide); G Sat Channel 28 (Nationwide) | October 1, 2006 | |
| October 1 | NBA Premium TV | Channel 21 (DTT); EasyTV Home Channel 6 (Metro Manila); Sky Cable Channel 84 (SD) / Channel 175 (HD) (Metro Manila) & Channel 312 (SD) / Channel 762 (HD) (Provincial); Cablelink Channel 350 (HD) (Metro Manila); Cignal Channel 96 (SD) / Channel 262 (HD) (Nationwide); Sky Direct Channel 25 (HD) (Nationwide) | October 16, 2010 | |

=== Stopped broadcasting ===
The following are a list of stations and channels or networks that have stopped broadcasting or (temporarily) off the air in 2019.

| Station | Channel | Stopped broadcasting | Resumed broadcasting | Reason | Source |
|---|---|---|---|---|---|
| DZRH News Television | Cignal Channel 18 (Nationwide); G Sat Channel 135 (Nationwide); SatLite Channel 140 (Nationwide); Cablelink Channel 3 (Metro Manila); Sky Cable Channel 129 (Metro Manila) | October 2 | October 3 (temporary radio feed of DZRH); November 26 | On October 2, a major fire broke out in Star City where its studios are located inside the Manila Broadcasting Company near the theme park, resulting to be temporary suspension of broadcasting and got affected by the fire. Resumed as temporary audio feed only on October 3, using its backup studios at the BSA Twin Towers in Mandaluyong with the network's programming also simulcast by video livestreaming through the station's Facebook page. Resumed its regular broadcasting on November 26, as DZRH moved again to Design Center of the Philippines within CCP Complex on November 11, with its satellite feed being restored. | |

== Awards ==
- July 23: 27th KBP Golden Dove Awards, organized by the Kapisanan ng mga Brodkaster ng Pilipinas
- October 13: 33rd PMPC Star Awards for Television, organized by Philippine Movie Press Club

== Deaths ==
February

- February 9 – Bentong (b. 1964), actor and comedian
- February 11 – Armida Siguion-Reyna (b. 1930), actress
- February 23 – Kristoffer King (b. 1982), actor

March

- March 8 - Boyong Baytion, (b. 1953), comedian and assistant director (Palibhasa Lalake, Abangan Ang Susunod Na Kabanata, Ang TV and Home Along Da Riles)
- March 9 – Chokoleit, (b. 1970), TV host, actor, and comedian
- March 13 – Maria "Bulaklak" Ausente, (b. 1989), former TV Patrol Panay and GMA News correspondent
- March 18 - Augusto Victa, (b. 1931), former TV and radio drama actor.

April

- April 1 - Joseph Ubalde, (b. 1986), former News5 weather anchor; and contributor and researcher of VERA Files

May

- May 31 – Gary Lising, (b. 1942), former comedian.

June

- June 20 – Eddie Garcia, (b. 1929), actor and film director.

July

- July 8 – Chito Arceo, (b. 1949), former actor and television sales executive.

August

- August 19 - Gina Lopez, (b. 1953), former Department of Environment and Natural Resources secretary, chairperson, managing director and TV producer of ABS-CBN Foundation and host of G Diaries.
- August 25 - Mona Lisa, (b. 1922), actress.

September

- September 8 - Lito Legaspi, (b. 1942), actor.

October

- October 5 - Amalia Fuentes, (b. 1940), actress.
- October 8 - Carlos Celdran, (b. 1972), cultural activist and performance artist.

December

- December 9 - Miko Palanca, (b. 1978), actor.
- December 13 - Cesar Apolinario, (b. 1973), GMA News reporter and host of iJuander.

== See also ==
- 2019 in television
