= K Movies Pinoy =

Defunct Pay Television channel in the Philippines

- Country: Philippines
- Broadcast area: Defunct

Programming
- Languages: Tagalog (main); Korean (secondary)
- Picture format: 1080i (16:9 HDTV)

Ownership
- Owner: Viva Communications
- Sister channels: Viva TV; Pinoy Box Office; Tagalized Movie Channel; Sari-Sari Channel

History
- Launched: July 1, 2019 (Test broadcast); August 1, 2019 (Official launch)
- Closed: May 1, 2021

Links
- Website: Archived official website at the Wayback Machine (archived 2021-02-27)

K Movies Pinoy was a Filipino cable channel owned by Viva Communications. It broadcast Filipino-dubbed Korean films 24/7. Most of the films broadcast were action films, but the channel also showcased other genres including romance, thriller, horror and drama as well.

After 21 months of broadcasting, K Movies Pinoy has permanently ceased its operations by Viva Entertainment due to discontinuation of its telecast by content provider. Meanwhile, all Filipino-dubbed Korean movies continues to air on its sister channel, Tagalized Movie Channel.
