= Community Basketball Association =

Philippine regional amateur basketball league

Community Basketball Association (CBA – Pilipinas)
- Sport: Basketball
- Founded: June 2018
- First season: January 27, 2019
- Folded: March 2020
- President: Carlo Maceda
- Commissioner: Pido Jarencio
- Motto: Liga ng Lahing Pilipino
- No. of teams: 12
- Country: Philippines
- Continent: FIBA Asia (Asia)
- Last champions: San Juan Knights; Palayan City Capitals (co-champions)
- Most titles: San Juan Knights (2 Titles)

The Community Basketball Association (CBA – Pilipinas / CBA – Philippines) was a regional-based grassroots basketball tournament based in the Philippines. Founded in June 2018, the league aimed to become an avenue to scout and expose young basketball players from various places across the country. The league was founded by former actor and model-turned-director and basketball enthusiast Carlo Maceda.

16 teams from across Luzon area (Binangonan, Bulacan, Caloocan, Marikina, Manila, General Trias, Malabon, Nueva Ecija, Parañaque, Pasig, Rizal, (Team A & B) Quezon City, San Juan, San Mateo, Valenzuela) participated in the league's 1st Founder's Cup with San Juan Knights EXILE winning the title. All games aired on IBC-13 and ZOE Broadcasting Network's Light TV.

The last tournament the league held was the Next-18 tournament, which was cancelled due to the COVID-19 pandemic.

== Teams ==
=== East Division ===
- Palayan City Capitals
- Binangonan Challengers
- Batang Maynila - Manila Sausage Kings
- Tarlac Troopers
- Arceegee - Malabon Squad
- Nueva Ecija Golden Grains

=== West Division ===
- San Juan Knights NAVY - Go For Gold
- Mabalacat Tribes
- Caloocan Hurricane Saints
- Parañaque High Flyers
- RIZABA Patriots - One Big Wash
- Quezon City - Cleon and Clyde

== CBA NEXT U-18 Teams (2019-2020) ==
- Binangonan Lake Hounds
- Batang Maynila Junior Sausage Kings
- Caloocan Hurricane Big Fans
- Parañaque Perpetual Meatiniks
- San Juan Mapua - Go For Gold
- Quezon City - Batang Kyusi Black Mamba
- Marikina Shoeters
- Pasig Spartans
- Rizal - LSGH Tankers
- RIZABA - Fatima Indus Real Estate
- Nueva Ecija Dragons
- Nueva Ecija Golden Plains
- Nueva Ecija Rainmakers
- Nueva Ecija Warriors
- Arceegee - Malabon Squad
- Valenzuela MYO Selection
