= Superstore season 4 =

Season of television series

Superstore
- Season 4
- Promotional poster.
- Starring: America Ferrera; Ben Feldman; Lauren Ash; Colton Dunn; Nico Santos; Nichole Sakura; Mark McKinney
- No. of episodes: 22

Release
- Original network: NBC
- Original release: October 4, 2018 – May 16, 2019

Season chronology
- ← Previous; Season 3 Next → Season 5

The fourth season of Superstore, the American television series, was ordered on February 21, 2018. The season premiered on October 4, 2018 and contained 22 episodes. The series continued to air in the same timeslot Thursday at 8:00 pm. The season concluded on May 16, 2019.

Superstore follows a group of employees working at Cloud 9, a fictional big-box store in St. Louis, Missouri. The ensemble and supporting cast features America Ferrera, Ben Feldman, Lauren Ash, Colton Dunn, Nico Santos, Nichole Bloom, and Mark McKinney.

== Cast ==
=== Main ===
- America Ferrera as Amy Sosa
- Ben Feldman as Jonah Simms
- Lauren Ash as Dina Fox
- Colton Dunn as Garrett McNeil
- Nico Santos as Mateo Fernando Aquino Liwanag
- Nichole Bloom as Cheyenne Thompson
- Mark McKinney as Glenn Philip Sturgis

=== Recurring ===
- Michael Bunin as Jeff Sutton
- Kaliko Kauahi as Sandra Kaluiokalani
- Johnny Pemberton as Bo Derek Thompson
- Jon Barinholtz as Marcus White
- Linda Porter as Myrtle Vartanian
- Josh Lawson as Tate Staskiewicz
- Kelly Stables as Kelly Watson
- Kelly Schumann as Justine Sikowitz
- Kerri Kenney-Silver as Jerusha Sturgis
- Irene White as Carol
- Amir M. Korangy as Sayid
- Jennifer Irwin as Laurie Neustadt

== Episodes ==
No. overall	No. in season	Title	Directed by	Written by	Original release date	U.S. viewers (millions)
56	1	"Back to School"	Matt Sohn	Jonathan Green	October 4, 2018	3.16
On their first day back from suspension, Amy and Jonah brace themselves for a barrage of jokes and snide comments about their sex video. Jeff goes to extreme lengths to win back Mateo, further alienating himself from the rest of the staff. Meanwhile, Kelly is temporarily put in charge of the store in the middle of a hectic Back to School sale, and panics. At the end of the episode, it is revealed that Amy and Jonah are dating. Amy's name tag: Roz (working at a diner) / Emily
57	2	"Baby Shower"	Jeffrey Blitz	Bridget Kyle & Vicky Luu	October 11, 2018	3.01
Jonah helps Amy get creative to stock up on supplies for her new baby, while Glenn and Jerusha take maternity pictures that inspire Dina to have her own photo shoot – art-directed by Mateo. When word gets around that Amy is having a baby shower, Glenn asks that the party also be celebrated for Jerusha, and for Cheyenne, who is upset she never had a baby shower when she had been pregnant. Amy's name tag: Etta
58	3	"Toxic Workplace"	Jay Karas	Aaron Lee	October 18, 2018	3.16
Amy and Jonah go to great lengths to keep their relationship a secret after being caught carpooling together. Cheyenne decides to put together a carpooling plan for all the employees, but finds it tougher than she thought. Meanwhile, Glenn receives news that Kelly wants to transfer to another Cloud 9 location, causing him to upset multiple Employee of the Month winner Mateo by giving the award to Kelly. Also, Carol continues to fight for Sandra’s boyfriend Jerry, after seeing the two planning to move in together. Amy's name tag: Denise
59	4	"Costume Competition"	Todd Biermann	Justin Shanes	October 25, 2018	3.06
It’s Halloween time at Cloud 9 and Glenn announces a store wide costume contest with the winner receiving one day of paid time off. Amy and Mateo do everything in their power to win by proclaiming other employees' costumes to be offensive or racially insensitive. Jonah is frustrated when no one understands his "Gerry Mander" costume. Meanwhile, Garrett gets annoyed with the store music playing the same Halloween song over and over. Also, Glenn gets haunted by the new Cloud 9 automatic cart collector. Amy's name tag: Harriet / Louise
60	5	"Delivery Day"	Daniella Eisman	Gabe Miller	November 1, 2018	3.21
Dina and Amy go into labor at the same time. Once at the hospital, Amy learns they won't accept her health insurance, and she is forced to switch to a clinic that does. Adam arrives just before his and Amy's son is born, and Jonah decides not to tell him about dating Amy. Dina is forced to have an emergency C-section, delivering a baby girl for Glenn and Jerusha. Meanwhile, Mateo and Garrett round up the Cloud 9 employees to make Dina and Amy cards for their babies, but they argue about what to write in them. Amy's name tag: Mila
61	6	"Maternity Leave"	Jackie Clarke	Jackie Clarke	November 8, 2018	3.27
Amy faces a nightmare day when she learns she doesn't get maternity leave, due to her tenure being restarted following her suspension. Thus, she has to head into work just two days after giving birth. This is made worse by Cheyenne and Mateo learning Amy named her son Parker and attempting to convince her to change the name. Meanwhile, Jonah and Garrett take on hiring the new seasonal help, which turns out to be much more than they bargained for. Elsewhere, Dina, while still recovering from her own birth in the hospital, monitors the store on an iPad with help from Sandra. Amy's name tag: Tara
62	7	"New Initiative"	Ken Whittingham	Ben Dougan	November 15, 2018	3.31
Glenn announces Cloud 9's new "Smaisle" initiative, in which associates are encouraged to engage in small talk with customers. One of the first couples that Amy chats with turns out to be Jonah's visiting parents, who claim that their son is in medical school. Amy tries to keep his secret, but it proves difficult. Meanwhile, Dina and Garrett make a bet over who can hold a smile the longest. Amy's name tag: Gabriela
63	8	"Managers' Conference"	Phil Traill	Brian Gatewood & Alessandro Tanaka	December 6, 2018	3.36
Amy and Jonah use Glenn's passes to travel to Chicago for a Cloud 9 managers conference. They soon realize that the higher ups have very little regard for the floor workers. Meanwhile, Mateo makes the ultimate sacrifice and reveals his undocumented immigrant status. When Glenn finds out, he decides to not report Mateo. Also, Garrett is put in charge of the gift wrapping station and asks Dina for assistance. Amy's name tag: Louisa / Chien (conference)
64	9	"Shadowing Glenn"	Geeta V. Patel	Matt Lawton	December 13, 2018	2.98
Amy approaches Glenn to say she is considering going into the Cloud 9 management training program. An excited Glenn insists that Amy first learn everything he knows about managing a store. Meanwhile, realizing that she is in a dead end job, Dina considers a new career with Jonah’s help. Also, Mateo and Cheyenne discuss starting a business venture together. Amy's name tag: Nola / Ruby
65	10	"Cloud 9 Academy"	Jeffrey Blitz	John Kazlauskas	March 7, 2019	3.07
Amy and Cheyenne attend the Cloud 9 Academy to get insights on the Management training program. During the training, Amy tries to distance herself from Cheyenne, whom she views as a threat to passing the course. Meanwhile, Dina and Garrett babysit Glenn’s daughter while he babyproofs his office, after which he gets trapped in by a babyproof doorknob. Also, Mateo and Jonah organize a rally against the Philippine president in order for Mateo to claim asylum and become a U.S. citizen. Amy's name tag: Amy (Cloud 9 Academy)
66	11	"Steps Challenge"	Todd Biermann	Bridget Kyle & Vicky Luu	March 14, 2019	3.26
Glenn announces that Corporate has an introduced a new program for its employees to do a steps challenge against other Cloud 9 stores for a chance to have lunch with the Cloud 9 Vice President. Amy and Dina take it one step further to sabotage other stores and try to keep them from winning. Meanwhile, Glenn has trouble getting around the store after injuring his ankle. Amy's name tag: Sierra / Cindy / Joanna
67	12	"Blizzard"	Amy York Rubin	Dayo Adesokan	March 21, 2019	3.86
With a massive blizzard barrelling through St. Louis, corporate refuses to let Glenn close the store early, trapping the Cloud 9 employees and a few customers in the store overnight. As the employees try to pass the time, they start to criticize each other’s bad habits. Meanwhile, Sandra reunites with Jerry. Amy's name tag: Yemi
68	13	"Love Birds"	Mark McKinney	Aaron Lee	March 28, 2019	3.38
It’s Valentine's Day and chaos ensues at Cloud 9 when Dina brings her pet birds to work. Later on, Garrett accidentally lets them out of the cage. Meanwhile, Amy and Jonah celebrate their first Valentine's Day together, Cheyenne gives Marcus a tattoo, and Sandra tries to hide from Carol the fact that she is dating Jerry again. Also, Glenn reveals to Amy that he works 16 to 19 hours a day, inspiring him to make a home movie for his child to see in the future. Amy's name tag: Lucia
69	14	"Minor Crimes"	Ross Novie	L.E. Correia	April 4, 2019	3.11
Glenn announces that he has demoted himself from store manager to floor worker, so he can work fewer hours. Dina encourages Amy to apply for store manager, however, District Manager Laurie has already decided to hire her inept son to take Glenn’s place. Later on, Amy catches Laurie doing drugs and has to decide to either blackmail her or look the other way. Meanwhile, Glenn asks for Jonah and Mateo’s help to use his “rainy day fund” (money that corporate allocated for repairs that Glenn stashed instead) to fix up the store. Also, Garrett and Cheyenne adjust to not using their phones during work hours. Amy's name tag: Dani / Hope
70	15	"Salary"	James Renfroe	Ben Dougan & Matt Lawton	April 11, 2019	3.37
Amy begins her first day as the new Store Manager, and is shocked to learn about her high salary, bonuses and perks. Later on, Amy rehires Myrtle as her assistant and Myrtle unintentionally reveals Amy's salary to the entire store. Meanwhile, Glenn begins his first day as a floor worker, and annoys Garrett with his cheerful approach to the job. Dina encourages Jonah and Amy to break up after Amy takes Jonah's side in a debate over expensive security upgrades. Also, Mateo assumes the role of new floor supervisor, even though no one has promoted him. Amy's name tag: Melanie
71	16	"Easter"	Victor Nelli, Jr.	Story by : John Kazlaukas; Teleplay by : Brian Gatewood & Alessandro Tanaka	April 18, 2019	3.04
It’s Easter time at Cloud 9 and Dina is put on high alert when she sees a person dressed as a bunny rabbit stalking around the store. Meanwhile, Amy learns that Dina installed security cameras in the break room, so she uses them to eavesdrop on employees who she fears are talking bad about her. Elsewhere, Glenn worries when he learns he's been promoted from a minor role to the role of Judas in his church's passion play, so he gets Garrett to help him rehearse. At the end of the episode, the man in the bunny rabbit costume is revealed to be Jerry, who is wearing it to sneak around with Sandra without Carol noticing. Amy's name tag: Bea
72	17	"Quinceañera"	Rebecca Asher	Justin Shanes	April 25, 2019	2.95
Jonah begins to feel out of place when Amy invites him to her daughter Emma's quinceañera celebration that her ex husband is also attending. Things begin to head south as Jonah causes multiple incidents, embarrassing himself in front of much of Amy's family. Meanwhile, to pass time at the party, Garrett and Dina flirt with each other while Mateo and Cheyenne become obsessed with seeing Amy cry after hearing she is an ugly crier. Also, Glenn tries to seem less ignorant by researching all there is to know about Honduran culture and quinceañeras. Amy's name tag: Poot
73	18	"Cloud Green"	Heather Jack	Jonathan Green & Gabe Miller	May 2, 2019	3.01
After Amy sees Glenn letting his pastor give away plants in the store for Earth Day while using the forum to sell his book, Dina advises her to discipline him but Glenn is having a hard time giving up his old authority. Meanwhile, Jonah is appointed as the ambassador for the Cloud 9 "Green Initiative" to use recycled products to help save the planet. When things don’t go as planned, Cheyenne appoints herself the new ambassador and moves the group toward social media initiatives that don't really solve anything. Also, Garrett makes fun of Jonah when the latter says he’s like Bono. Amy's name tag: Rowena
74	19	"Scanners"	Victor Nelli, Jr.	Dayo Adesokan & L.E. Correia	May 9, 2019	2.91
Amy is horrified when she finds out that corporate wants to cut employee hours and turns to Dina, who is more than happy to make the announcement. Dina quickly finds the situation troubling when employees share their sob stories as to why they need more hours. Meanwhile, the employees play a version of laser tag with the new Cloud 9 scanners. Also, Mateo learns that Marcus is homeless and lives in the Cloud 9 stock room. Mateo lets slip that he is undocumented, and worries about how well Marcus will hide the secret. Amy's name tag: Adenike
75	20	"#Cloud9Fail"	Betsy Thomas	John Kazlauskas & Josh Malmuth	May 9, 2019	2.46
With the hours cut back, the Cloud 9 store is in shambles and there are messes everywhere. Things take a turn when anonymous tweets about the store go viral. This initially has corporate telling Amy they will add employee hours, but Amy and Jonah take their own tweets too far, forcing a corporate executive to come to the store and investigate. Meanwhile, Cheyenne and Mateo make a garage sale inside the store for extra money, with Garrett joining in to sell off his sneaker collection. Also, while searching for the person responsible for the tweets, Dina discovers old security camera footage showing that Garrett let her birds go on Valentines Day. In retaliation, Dina sets fire to all of his shoes. Amy's name tag: Gloria
76	21	"Sandra's Fight"	America Ferrera	Sean Lee & Jen Vierck	May 16, 2019	2.38
Amy and Dina learn that there is talk of store 1217 being shut down and travel to corporate offices in Chicago in order to convince them otherwise. Amy is horrified to learn that corporate knows about Sandra’s fight for a union, putting her store at the top of the list for closure. Meanwhile, Jonah tries to sabotage the union meeting but comes to realize that he is losing his way for fighting for what’s right, leading to tension between him and Amy. Also, after the news of his releasing Dina's birds is spread, the employees give Garrett the cold shoulder. Amy's name tag: Dwendyna
77	22	"Employee Appreciation Day"	Jeffrey Blitz	Justin Spitzer	May 16, 2019	1.95
The Cloud 9 stores celebrate an “Employee Appreciation Day” in order for corporate to win their employees over. Amy and Jonah are on opposite sides when it comes to forming a union; Amy says she is trying to save all their jobs from a store closure while Jonah accuses her of only looking out for her own high-paying job. Later on, corporate finds out about Mateo’s undocumented status and sends U.S. Immigration and Customs Enforcement (ICE) to the store. Despite the workers' best efforts to keep him safe, Mateo ultimately gives up and is taken away in front of all the employees. Amy then agrees with Jonah that they should fight corporate and unionize. Amy's name tag: Aylin

== Production ==
=== Casting ===
It was announced on September 10, 2018 that former The Middle star Eden Sher had been cast in a guest role as a potential new Cloud 9 employee named Penny, whom Ben Feldman's character Jonah and Colton Dunn’s character Garrett hire during the seasonal months.

== Reception ==
The fourth season received critical acclaim with critics saying “Superstore remains a furtively fearless riot in its comedic approach to heavy and issues of the time” with a score of 100% on Rotten Tomatoes.

== Ratings ==
Viewership and ratings per episode of Superstore season 4
No.	Title	Air date	Rating/share (18–49)	Viewers (millions)	DVR (18–49)	DVR viewers (millions)	Total (18–49)	Total viewers (millions)
1	"Back to School"	October 4, 2018	0.9/4	3.16	0.5	1.27	1.4	4.43
2	"Baby Shower"	October 11, 2018	0.8/4	3.01	0.5	1.23	1.3	4.19
3	"Toxic Workplace"	October 18, 2018	0.9/4	3.16	0.5	1.23	1.4	4.39
4	"Costume Competition"	October 25, 2018	0.9/4	3.06	0.5	1.26	1.4	4.33
5	"Delivery Day"	November 1, 2018	0.9/4	3.21	0.4	1.06	1.3	4.23
6	"Maternity Leave"	November 8, 2018	0.9/4	3.27	0.6	1.25	1.5	4.52
7	"New Initiative"	November 15, 2018	0.9/4	3.31	0.6	1.23	1.5	4.54
8	"Managers’ Conference"	December 6, 2018	0.9/4	3.36	TBD	TBD	TBD	TBD
9	"Shadowing Glenn"	December 13, 2018	0.7/3	2.98	0.5	1.14	1.2	4.12
10	"Cloud 9 Academy"	March 7, 2019	0.8/4	3.07	0.6	1.37	1.4	4.44
11	"Steps Challenge"	March 14, 2019	0.9/5	3.26	0.5	TBD	1.4	TBD
12	"Blizzard"	March 21, 2019	0.9/4	3.86	0.4	TBD	1.3	TBD
13	"Love Birds"	March 28, 2019	0.8/4	3.38	0.5	TBD	1.3	TBD
14	"Minor Crimes"	April 4, 2019	0.8/4	3.11	0.5	1.12	1.3	4.23
15	"Salary"	April 11, 2019	0.9/5	3.37	0.4	TBD	1.3	TBD
16	"Easter"	April 18, 2019	0.9/5	3.04	0.4	TBD	1.3	TBD
17	"Quinceañera"	April 25, 2019	0.7/3	2.95	0.5	TBD	1.2	TBD
18	"Cloud Green"	May 2, 2019	0.9/5	3.01	0.5	TBD	1.4	TBD
19	"Scanners"	May 9, 2019	0.8/5	2.91	0.5	TBD	1.3	TBD
20	"#Cloud9Fail"	May 9, 2019	0.7/4	2.46	0.5	TBD	1.2	TBD
21	"Sandra’s Fight"	May 16, 2019	0.6/3	2.38	0.4	1.07	1.1	3.41
22	"Employee Appreciation Day"	May 16, 2019	0.6/3	1.95	0.5	1.19	1.1	3.14
