= Rashida Olayiwola =

American actress and writer

- Born: Chicago, Illinois, U.S.
- Occupations: Writer, actress, comedian
- Known for: Bailiff Nikki in Jury Duty

Rashida "Sheedz" Olayiwola is an American actress, comedian, and writer. She is best known for her role as Bailiff Nikki on season one of the reality hoax comedy series Jury Duty. She has written for Sherman's Showcase and South Side, and acted in Insecure, A Black Lady Sketch Show, and the Netflix animated series Good Times: Black Again.

== Life and career ==
Olayiwola was born and raised in Chicago. She began acting in college after joining a Black theatre workshop. She won a scholarship to train in improvisational comedy at the Second City. She named Kim Wayans and Debra Wilson as two of her comedic influences.

As a stand-up comedian, she has opened for Arsenio Hall, Hannibal Burress, Zainab Johnson, and others.

Olayiwola was a staff writer for the Chicago-set comedy series South Side co-created by Diallo Riddle and Bashir Salahuddin. She reunited with Riddle and Salahuddin as writer for season two of the IFC variety series Sherman’s Showcase. She was also a writer for the web series The Syd & TP Show, as well as the BET Awards, BET Hip Hop Awards, and the Soul Train Awards. Olayiwola was the head writer for the 2024 BET Awards, the second woman to hold that position after Nefetari Spencer.

As an actress she has appeared in Insecure and A Black Lady Sketch Show. She was a voice actress in the Netflix animated reboot Good Times. In 2023 she gained wider prominence as Bailiff Nikki on the Prime Video series Jury Duty, which received Best Ensemble Cast In A New Scripted Series at the Independent Spirit Awards. She signed with Independent Artist Group in December 2023. Olayiwola was announced as a main cast member in an undisclosed role in the Marvel series Ironheart.
