= Eric Ledgin =

American television writer and producer

- Occupations: Television writer, producer, showrunner
- Years active: 2005–present
- Known for: St. Denis Medical; Superstore; It's Always Sunny in Philadelphia
- Spouse: Kelsey Ledgin (m. 2013)
- Children: 1

Eric Ledgin is an American television writer and producer best known as co-creator and showrunner of the NBC mockumentary sitcom St. Denis Medical. Over a career spanning more than two decades, he has written and produced for several workplace comedies, including Superstore and It's Always Sunny in Philadelphia; he has also worked on WordGirl. He received a Primetime Emmy Award nomination in 2013 for Night Of Too Many Stars: America Comes Together For Autism Programs.

== Early life ==
Ledgin has recalled watching the British version of The Office at around age 23 as a defining creative moment, describing it as the first television show he actively wished he had made himself. By the time he felt he had established himself as a writer, he was 30, and feared the mockumentary format had gone out of fashion; the concern that was later relieved by the success of Abbott Elementary.

== Career ==
=== Early work and late night ===
Ledgin began his career as a writer on Late Night with Jimmy Fallon on NBC. His work on the Comedy Central special Night of Too Many Stars: America Comes Together for Autism Programs earned him a Primetime Emmy Award for Outstanding Writing for a Variety Special nomination in 2013, alongside head writer Eric Slovin and fellow writers including Robert Smigel.

=== It's Always Sunny in Philadelphia ===
Ledgin joined the writing staff of FXX's long-running comedy It's Always Sunny in Philadelphia — the longest-running live-action sitcom in American television history — serving as co-producer and later producer across two seasons (2016–2017).

=== Superstore and Universal Television ===
Ledgin became a producer on Justin Spitzer's NBC comedy Superstore beginning with its premiere in 2015, eventually rising to co-executive producer. He also served as a writer and producer on other Universal Television productions including the HBO series Mrs. Fletcher, the Peacock comedy Rutherford Falls, and NBC's American Auto, on which he was an executive producer for both seasons (2021–2023).

In July 2022, Deadline Hollywood reported that Ledgin had signed an exclusive overall deal with Universal Television to develop and produce new projects across multiple platforms. Jim Donnelly, Universal TV's executive vice president of comedy development, cited Ledgin's contributions to the studio's comedy across Superstore, Rutherford Falls, and American Auto.

=== WordGirl ===
Ledgin also wrote for the PBS Kids animated series WordGirl, contributing scripts across multiple seasons between 2009 and 2015.

== St. Denis Medical ==
In February 2023, NBC ordered a pilot for St. Denis Medical, a mockumentary comedy set at an underfunded, understaffed Oregon hospital, co-created by Ledgin and longtime collaborator Justin Spitzer. The series premiered on NBC in November 2024 and stars Wendi McLendon-Covey, David Alan Grier, Allison Tolman, Josh Lawson, Mekki Leeper, Kahyun Kim, and Kaliko Kauahi.

Ledgin serves as showrunner, a role he has described as drawing on his long history with workplace comedies and his admiration for the mockumentary format. The series was renewed for a second season and subsequently for a third season.

== Filmography ==
Filmography
| Year | Title | Role | Network / Platform |
|---|---|---|---|
| 2007–2015 | WordGirl | Writer | PBS Kids |
| 2009 | Late Night with Jimmy Fallon | Writer | NBC |
| 2012 | Night of Too Many Stars | Writer | Comedy Central |
| 2015–2018 | Superstore | Producer, co-executive producer | NBC |
| 2016–2017 | It's Always Sunny in Philadelphia | Co-producer, producer | FXX |
| 2019 | Mrs. Fletcher | Writer, producer | HBO |
| 2021 | Rutherford Falls | Writer, co-executive producer | Peacock |
| 2021–2023 | American Auto | Writer, executive producer | NBC |
| 2024–present | St. Denis Medical | Co-creator, showrunner, executive producer | NBC; Peacock |

== Accolades ==
Awards and nominations
| Year | Award | Category | Work | Result |
|---|---|---|---|---|
| 2011 | Primetime Emmy Award | Outstanding Writing For A Variety, Music Or Comedy Series | Late Night with Jimmy Fallon | Nominated |
| 2013 | Primetime Emmy Award | Outstanding Writing for a Variety Special | Night of Too Many Stars: America Comes Together for Autism Programs | Nominated |
