= All Happy Families (2023 film) =

2024 film directed by Haroula Rose

- Directed by: Haroula Rose
- Written by: Haroula Rose; Coburn Goss
- Produced by: Liz Cardenas; Coburn Goss; Ian Keiser; Mary Angela Munez; Haroula Rose
- Starring: Josh Radnor; Chandra Russell; Rob Huebel; Becky Ann Baker; Colleen Camp; John Ashton; David Pasquesi; Rodney Crowell
- Cinematography: Johanna Coelho
- Edited by: Caralyn Moore; Alex Márquez
- Music by: Zac Rae; Oliver Hill
- Distributed by: Freestyle Digital Media
- Release date: October 12, 2023 (United States); (limited)
- Running time: 90 minutes
- Country: United States
- Language: English

All Happy Families is a 2023 American comedy-drama film written, directed, and produced by Haroula Rose, with Michael Shannon serving as executive producer. It stars Josh Radnor, Chandra Russell, Rob Huebel, Becky Ann Baker, David Pasquesi, Rodney Crowell and Colleen Camp.

== Plot ==
When the Landry family reunites to renovate their ancestral home, old flames reignite, and new tensions arise. As they navigate love, retirement, and fame, a stunning revelation threatens to upend their family bond and unity.

== Cast ==
- Josh Radnor as Graham Landry
- Chandra Russell as Dana Allen
- Rob Huebel as Will Landry
- Becky Ann Baker as Sue Landry
- Colleen Camp as Lila
- John Ashton as Roy Landry
- Ivy O’Brian as Evie
- David Pasquesi as Jerry
- Rodney Crowell as Dino

== Release ==
All Happy Families premiered in the U.S. at the Chicago International Film Festival on October 12, 2023, and at the Mill Valley Film Festival on October 14, 2023, and had its international premiere at the Galway Film Fleadh on July 12, 2023. In June 2024, it was announced that Freestyle Releasing had acquired the distribution rights for the film, and would release it in a limited theatrical run and on video-on-demand (VOD) soon.

The film competed at several festivals, including Sidewalk Film Festival, Dances With Films, Port Townsend Film Festival, and San Luis Obispo International Film Festival.

== Reception ==
=== Critical response ===
On review aggregator Rotten Tomatoes, the film holds an approval rating of 87% based on 23 reviews, with an average rating of 7.30/10. Metacritic, which uses a weighted average, assigned the film a score of 67 out of 100, based on 4 critics, indicating "generally favorable" reviews.

Richard Roeper of the Chicago Sun-Times gave the film 2 out of 4 stars, writing, "In just 90 minutes, Chicago-born director and co-writer Haroula Rose (“Once Upon a River”) skillfully weaves together a myriad of storylines in a slice-of-life comedy-drama that rings true in every moment. There’s not a single character in this film that doesn’t come across as authentic... it leaves us wanting more. There’s so much more we’d like to discover about this unhappy family."

Nell Minow of RogerEbert.com gave the film three stars, saying, "Strong performances by an excellent cast...… Director Haroula Rose, who co-wrote the film with Coburn Goss, gives it a leisurely, lived-in feeling. The actors, especially Baker, bring layers to the characters that hold our interest, earn our affection, and make us reconsider Tolstoy—there is more than one way to be a happy family." Michael Phillips of the Chicago Tribune wrote: "With actors as good as Becky Ann Baker, co-writer and director Haroula Rose’s second feature keeps one foot in easygoing naturalism."

== Accolades ==
Year	Award	Category	Recipient(s)	Result	Ref.
2023	Chicago International Film Festival	Best Film	Haroula Rose	Nominated	
2023	Mill Valley Film Festival	Best Film	Haroula Rose	Nominated	
