= Chandra Russell =

American actress and writer

- Born: Chicago, Illinois, U.S.
- Education: New York University (BFA)
- Occupations: Actress, writer
- Known for: South Side
- Spouse: Bashir Salahuddin (m. 2017)

Chandra Russell is an American actress and writer. She is known for her performance in the comedy series South Side.

== Life and career ==
Russell was born and raised on the south side of Chicago. She attended Lincoln Park High School. Although she initially wanted to pursue dramatic acting, she stated "comedy just came to me because Chicago is just a naturally very funny city. Everybody in Chicago is sure that they are the funniest person you ever met." Russell trained in acting at New York University Tisch School of the Arts.

Russell co-wrote and starred in the cult YouTube web series Downtown Girls. She gained wider prominence as a lead on the Chicago-set series South Side, co-created by and co-starring her husband, Bashir Salahuddin. She was also in the writer's room and helped develop her character, Officer Turner.

She starred in the 2024 film All Happy Families directed by Haroula Rose and filmed in Chicago. She is developing a comedy project with her Downtown Girls writing partners.

Russell resides with her husband and children in Los Angeles.
