= Digman! =

American animated sitcom

- Genre: Animated sitcom
- Created by: Neil Campbell; Andy Samberg
- Directed by: Mike L. Mayfield (season 1)
- Voices of: Andy Samberg; Mitra Jouhari; Tim Robinson; Guz Khan; Dale Soules; Melissa Fumero; Tim Meadows
- Theme music composer: Trevor Rabin
- Composer: Matthew Compton
- Country of origin: United States
- Original language: English
- No. of seasons: 2
- No. of episodes: 16

Production
- Executive producers: Neil Campbell; Andy Samberg; Ali Bell; Akiva Schaffer; Jorma Taccone; Chris Prynoski; Shannon Prynoski; Antonio Canobbio; Ben Kalina
- Producers: Bre Andrade; Laura Allen
- Running time: 22 minutes
- Production companies: Dandyflower Productions; Lonely Island Classics; Titmouse, Inc.; CBS Studios; MTV Entertainment Studios

Original release
- Network: Comedy Central
- Release: March 22, 2023 – August 27, 2025

Digman! is an American animated sitcom created by Neil Campbell and Andy Samberg. Samberg stars in the titular role as a celebrity archaeologist along with Mitra Jouhari, Tim Robinson, Tim Meadows, Melissa Fumero, Guz Khan, and Dale Soules. The series premiered on March 22, 2023, on Comedy Central.

On May 10, 2023, it was announced that the series was renewed for a second season. On June 16, 2025, it was announced the second season would premiere on July 9, 2025. However, the second season was ultimately delayed to July 23, 2025, as the 27th season of South Park had also been delayed to the same date.

== Premise ==
Digman! is set in a world where archaeologists are celebrities. A retired adventurer haunted by the death of his wife Bella, Rip Digman and his team of experts travel to dangerous parts of the world to unearth legendary artifacts and grow their reputations as fearless adventurers.

== Voice cast ==
=== Main ===
- Andy Samberg as Rip Digman, an adventurer who returns to the world of archaeology after a twelve-year hiatus, following the death of his wife Bella. Samberg voices Digman with a voice based on that of Nicolas Cage.
- Mitra Jouhari as Saltine, Rip's student and current assistant archaeologist. She is Persian.
- Tim Robinson as Swooper Goodfly, Rip's pilot.
- Guz Khan as Zane Troy, Rip's former assistant, current rival and head archaeologist of Quail Eegan's museum.
- Dale Soules as Agatha, Rip's secretary.
- Melissa Fumero as Bella Torres, Rip's deceased wife. In the first season, Rip seeks the Holy Grail to revive her.
- Tim Meadows as Quail Eegan, a billionaire who runs the largest museum in the world.

=== Recurring ===
- Jiavani as Doreen Donker Jr., the co-anchor of Arky TV / various characters
- David Kaye as Howard Toe, the co-anchor of Arky TV / various characters
- Rachel Kaly as Trisket, Zane's assistant who becomes friends with Saltine
- Lauren Lapkus as Gasolina, the former princess of Puffland, who later marries Zane
- Mike Hanford as Billy Themet
- Neil Campbell as various characters
- Eric Bauza as various characters
- Jeffrey Wright as Uncle Christ, Quail's father
- Jorma Taccone as Buddy-Bot, Zane's talking robot
- Amy Sedaris as Senator Stacy Potts, the senator of North Dakota
- Stephanie Beatriz as Ximena
- Tom Kenny as Ice Bergens / Squawkler
- Carl Tart as O'Dooley / Douglas
- Claudia O'Doherty as Australia / Symone

=== Guest voices ===
- Andy Daly as Crank Turner #937
- Harvey Guillén as High Score
- Maya Rudolph as G.A.W.D.
- Jason Schwartzman as Roberto
- Lennon Parham as Lillian
- Joe Lo Truglio as Cale Caesar
- Jane Lynch as Amelia Earhart
- Kyle Mooney as Sludgely
- Daniel Radcliffe as Sebastian Lines
- Edgar Wright as Chap Kingsley
- Cole Escola as Gustavia
- Paul Rust as Kurt
- Marc Evan Jackson as The Speaker
- Kerri Kenney-Silver as Lottie
- Clancy Brown as Yedward
- Kirby Howell-Baptiste as Nigella
- Maurice LaMarche as King Puff
- Steve Buscemi as The Antiquarian
- Fran Gillespie as Nebulosa
- Seth Meyers as Chortles Collins
- Anne Ramsay as Jill
- Beth Grant as Laverne
- Beck Bennett as Carl Crunch
- Mark Hamill as Jasper Jenkins
- Dennis Haysbert as Vernon
- Rekha Shankar as Jaya
- Geraldine Viswanathan as Parisha
- Kate Winslet as Dr. Null
- Fred Armisen as Dr. Freud
- Flula Borg as Fritz
- Nathan Lane as Yorbo
- Kayvan Novak as Sam
- Artemis Pebdani as Mona
- John Waters as Magnus
- Whitmer Thomas as Ringo
- Tatiana Maslany as Vindita

== Episodes ==
Season	Episodes	Originally released	
Season	Episodes	First released	Last released
1	8	March 22, 2023	May 10, 2023
2	8	July 23, 2025	August 27, 2025

=== Season 1 (2023) ===
All episodes of this season were directed by series supervising director, Mike L. Mayfield.

No. overall	No. in season	Title	Written by	Original release date	Prod. code	U.S. viewers (millions)
1	1	"Pilot"	Neil Campbell & Andy Samberg	March 22, 2023	101	0.19
2	2	"Et Tu"	Emily Altman	March 29, 2023	102	0.15
3	3	"Fear of GAWD"	Hunter Toro	April 5, 2023 (Note: This episode premiered on Comedy Central and MTV simultaneously.)	103	0.25
4	4	"The Arky Gala"	Rachel Kaly	April 12, 2023	104	0.14
5	5	"The Mile High Club"	Rekha Shankar	April 19, 2023	105	0.16
6	6	"Shakespeare's Lost Sonnet"	Tim Kalpakis	April 26, 2023	106	0.12
7	7	"The Puff People"	Neil Campbell	May 3, 2023	107	0.15
8	8	"The Grail"	Neil Campbell & Tim Kalpakis	May 10, 2023	108	0.09

=== Season 2 (2025) ===
No. overall	No. in season	Title	Directed by	Written by	Original release date	Prod. code	U.S. viewers (millions)
9	1	"The Hunt for Bella"	Sarah Seember Huisken	Neil Campbell	July 23, 2025	201	0.16
10	2	"Jack and Rose"	Adam Ford	Tim Kalpakis	July 30, 2025	202	0.12
11	3	"A Sari Sight"	Nick Smith	Rekha Shankar	August 6, 2025	203	0.26
12	4	"The Eligible Arky"	Sarah Seember Huisken	Rachel Kaly	August 13, 2025	204	0.11
13	5	"Freud's Couch"	Adam Ford	Tim Zientek	August 13, 2025	205	N/A
14	6	"The Fortune Pursuit"	Nick Smith	Emily Altman & Rekha Shankar	August 20, 2025	206	0.17
15	7	"The Arky Trials"	Sarah Seember Huisken	Hunter Toro	August 20, 2025	207	N/A
16	8	"The Christ Figure"	Adam Ford	Neil Campbell & Andrea Jin	August 27, 2025	208	0.14

== Production ==
Digman! was co-written and co-created by Andy Samberg and Neil Campbell, who was co-executive producer for Brooklyn Nine-Nine. The series is the first written and produced by Samberg, who also stars. It is produced by CBS Studios, MTV Entertainment Studios, Dandyflower Productions, Lonely Island Classics, and Titmouse, Inc. with executive producers Ali Bell, Chris Prynoski, Shannon Prynoski, Antonio Canobbio, and Ben Kalina.

On September 14, 2022, the series regular cast members were announced: Tim Robinson, Mitra Jouhari, Dale Soules, Guz Khan, Melissa Fumero, and Tim Meadows. Several guest cast members were announced on February 13, 2023, including Maya Rudolph, Daniel Radcliffe, Jane Lynch, Edgar Wright, Kyle Mooney, Cole Escola, Lauren Lapkus, Paul Rust, Joe Lo Truglio, Jason Schwartzman, Marc Evan Jackson, Harvey Guillén, Claudia O'Doherty, Kerri Kenney-Silver, Clancy Brown, Mike Hanford, Rachel Kaly, Andy Daly, Lennon Parham, Carl Tart and Kirby Howell-Baptiste.

== Release ==
Digman! premiered on March 22, 2023, on Comedy Central and next day in Canada on CTV Comedy. The first two seasons are available to stream on Paramount+. On March 20, 2026, the first two seasons were made available to stream on Netflix.
