= Jury Duty (2023 TV series) =

American TV series

- Also known as: Jury Duty Presents: Company Retreat (season 2)
- Genre: Reality television hoax
- Created by: Lee Eisenberg; Gene Stupnitsky
- Showrunner: Cody Heller
- Directed by: Jake Szymanski
- Starring: James Marsden; Alan Barinholtz; Susan Berger; Cassandra Blair; David Brown; Kirk Fox; Ross Kimball; Pramode Kumar; Trisha LaFache; Mekki Leeper; Edy Modica; Kerry O'Neill; Rashida Olayiwola; Whitney Rice; Maria Russell; Ishmel Sahid; Ben Seaward; Ron Song; Evan Williams
- Music by: Danny Dunlap; John Nau; Andrew Feltenstein
- Country of origin: United States
- Original language: English
- No. of seasons: 2
- No. of episodes: 16

Production
- Executive producers: David Bernad; Lee Eisenberg; Gene Stupnitsky; Ruben Fleischer; Nicholas Hatton; Cody Heller; Todd Schulman; Jake Szymanski; Andrew Weinberg; Anthony King; Chris Kula; James Marsden
- Producer: Matthew McIntyre
- Cinematography: Chris Darnell
- Editors: Diana Fishman; Steven Rosenthal; Adam Lichtenstein; Mary DeChambres
- Running time: 26–29 minutes
- Production companies: Picrow; The District; Piece of Work Entertainment; Amazon MGM Studios (Note: Credited as Amazon Studios for season 1); Middle Child Pictures (Note: season 2–present)

Original release
- Network: Amazon Freevee
- Release: April 7 – April 21, 2023
- Network: Amazon Prime Video
- Release: March 20, 2026 – present

Jury Duty (also known as Jury Duty Presents: Company Retreat for season 2) is an American reality hoax sitcom television series created by Lee Eisenberg and Gene Stupnitsky, about a fake jury trial. It stars Ronald Gladden as a juror who is unaware of the hoax. James Marsden co-stars alongside an ensemble cast. It premiered on Amazon Freevee on April 7, 2023.

The series received three nominations at the 75th Primetime Emmy Awards, including Outstanding Comedy Series and Outstanding Supporting Actor in a Comedy Series for Marsden. It also received two nominations at the 81st Golden Globes, for Best Television Series – Musical or Comedy and Best Supporting Actor for Marsden. The series also won a Peabody Award.

In February 2025, a second season was confirmed to have already been filmed. Titled Jury Duty Presents: Company Retreat, the season transitions the setting from a courtroom to a corporate environment centered on a family-owned hot sauce business. The second season premiered on Amazon Prime Video on March 20, 2026, following the discontinuation of Freevee. In May 2026, the series was renewed for a third season.

== Premise ==
=== Season 1: Jury Duty ===
The first season chronicles the inner workings of a jury trial in the US through the eyes of juror Ronald Gladden, a solar contractor from San Diego, who is unaware that his jury duty summons was not official, and that everyone in the courtroom aside from him is an actor. Everything that happens, inside and outside the courtroom, is planned.

=== Season 2: Company Retreat ===
The second season follows Anthony Norman, who believes he has been hired as a temporary worker at family-owned business "Rockin' Grandma's Hot Sauce" to help manage the annual company retreat. Like the first season, every participant besides Anthony is an actor.

== Cast ==
=== Season 1 ===
==== Jurors ====
- Ronald Gladden as himself (Juror #6), a solar contractor from San Diego who serves as the jury foreperson and is the only person unaware that the entire trial is a staged hoax.
- James Marsden as himself (Juror #14), an alternate juror who portrays a "heightened," entitled, and self-absorbed parody of his real-life Hollywood persona.
- Mekki Leeper as Noah Price (Juror #11), a socially awkward rideshare driver who misses a long-planned vacation with his girlfriend to serve on the jury.
- Edy Modica as Jeannie Abruzzo (Juror #4), a boisterous and flirtatious juror who develops a strong, persistent romantic attraction to Noah during the trial.
- Ishmel Sahid as Lonnie Coleman (Juror #13), an "unproblematic" alternate juror who joins the main jury after Juror #7 is injured and released from the trial.
- David Brown as Todd Gregory (Juror #2), a socially awkward inventor with an interest in cybernetics who wears his "chair pants" invention to the courtroom.
- Cassandra Blair as Vanessa Jenkins (Juror #8), a self-professed true crime aficionado and "Reddit Bureau of Investigations" member who acts as the jury's lead conspiracy theorist.
- Maria Russell as Inez De Leon (Juror #10), an ambitious "boss babe" who fails to become foreperson but takes charge of the jury's lunch orders and social outings.
- Kirk Fox as Pat McCurdy (Juror #1), a regular juror who works as a commercial driving instructor for the DMV.
- Susan Berger as Barbara Goldstein (Juror #5), a retired woman who frequently falls asleep during the courtroom proceedings.
- Ross Kimball as Ross Kubiak (Juror #12), an affable middle school teacher who is going through a difficult separation from his wife.
- Pramode Kumar as Ravi Chattapodhyay (Juror #3), a sweet-natured and soft-spoken juror.
- Ron Song as Ken Hyun (Juror #9), a soft-spoken and slow-talking business owner who claims to manage two gumball machines.
- Brandon Loeser as Tim Smith (Juror #7), a juror who is dismissed early in the trial after sustaining an injury that requires him to be hospitalized.

==== Other ====
- Alan Barinholtz as Judge Alan Rosen, the presiding judge of the trial who is nearing retirement & frequently manages the courtroom's eccentricities.
- Rashida Olayiwola as Officer Nikki Wilder, the primary bailiff for the trial who maintains order in the courtroom and interacts frequently with the jurors.
- Whitney Rice as Jacquiline Hilgrove, the wealthy and self-described "relatable" plaintiff who owns the boutique business, Cinnamon and Sparrow.
- Ben Seaward as Trevor Morris, the defendant and Cinnamon and Sparrow employee who is accused by Hilgrove of causing significant harm to the business.
- Trisha LaFache as Debra LaSeur, the plaintiff's attorney
- Evan Williams as Shaun Sanders, the lead defense attorney for Trevor Morris, portrayed by a real-life writer from the show's production team.
- Kerry O'Neill as Officer Christine Sugalski, a friendly court security officer who bonds with the jurors and assists Noah in monitoring his girlfriend's social media activity during the trial.
- Peter Hulne as Randy "Cody" Schiller, the shift supervisor at Cinnamon and Sparrow who appears as a key witness for the plaintiff.
- Lisa Gilroy as Genevieve Telford-Warren, a multi-talented social media brand ambassador and "pampered" Instagram influencer who serves as a witness for the plaintiff.

=== Season 2: Company Retreat ===
==== Employees ====
- Anthony Norman as himself, a 25-year-old from Nashville and the only real person in the show, he is a temporary assistant at the fictional Rockin' Grandma's Hot Sauce company who believes he is being filmed for a documentary.
- Blair Beeken as Marjorie Lee, the activities manager and owner of Oak Canyon Ranch, the site of the company's annual retreat.
- Alex Bonifer as Dougie Womack Jr., the well-meaning but directionless son of the company's CEO, who is preparing to inherit and lead Rockin' Grandma's Hot Sauce.
- Warren Burke as Steve Mosley, a high-achieving sales and marketing representative at Rockin' Grandma's Hot Sauce.
- LaNisa Renee Frederick as Jackie Griffin, the distribution and logistics manager at Rockin' Grandma's Hot Sauce and a mother of three who is eager to spend time away from her children.
- Jerry Hauck as Doug Womack, the retiring CEO and founder of Rockin' Grandma's Hot Sauce.
- Erica Hernandez as Kate Martinez, the sales and marketing manager at Rockin' Grandma's Hot Sauce.
- Stephanie Hodge as Helen Schaffer, the cynical accountant at Rockin' Grandma's Hot Sauce.
- Rachel Kaly as Claire Coleman, a remote IT technician and web designer for Rockin' Grandma's who is socially awkward.
- Rob Lathan as "Other" Anthony Gwinn, the sourcing manager at Rockin' Grandma's, often referred to as "Other" Anthony.
- Emily Pendergast as Amy Patterson, the customer relations manager at Rockin' Grandma's and a devoted fan of Taylor Swift.
- Marc-Sully Saint-Fleur as PJ Green, the receptionist at Rockin' Grandma's who maintains an aspiring side career as a "snack influencer".
- Jim Woods as Jimmy Weber, the warehouse manager at Rockin' Grandma's.
- Ryan Perez as Kevin Gomez, the head of human resources at Rockin' Grandma's.

==== Other ====
- Wendy Braun as Elizabeth Prescott, the professional head of Triukas, a private equity group.
- Lisa Gilroy as Christine Westbrook-Clark, a motivational speaker
- Brian Patrick Farrell as Brian DeCoy
- Katy Colloton as Teri Braun
- Dan Perrault as Dan P.
- Ian Roberts as Scott Norris, an Mount Everest climber and motivational speaker
- Jarrad Paul as Graham Gertz, Triukas Brand Strategist
- Roni Lee as Rockin' Grandma
- Nicholas Rutherford as Cole, a realtor who has left behind a personal item at the retreat
- Ryan Vukelich as himself
- Sia as herself

== Episodes ==
=== Series overview ===
Season	Title	Episodes	Originally released		
Season	Title	Episodes	First released	Last released	Network
1	—	8	April 7, 2023	April 21, 2023	Amazon Freevee
2	Company Retreat	8	March 20, 2026	April 3, 2026	Amazon Prime Video

=== Season 1 (2023) ===
No. overall	No. in season	Title	Directed by	Written by	Original release date	Prod. code
1	1	"Voir Dire"	Jake Szymanski	Tanner Bean & Katrina Mathewson	April 7, 2023	JURY101
Ronald Gladden arrives at the Huntington Park Superior Court in Los Angeles to serve on a jury for a civil trial he does not know is being staged. Various jurors attempt to get out of jury duty by offering excuses during the voir dire process. The judge, initially lenient, becomes strict after a lunch break during which he claims his car was broken into. Paparazzi show up to photograph James Marsden, prompting the judge to sequester the jury to avoid potential disruption.
2	2	"Opening Arguments"	Jake Szymanski	Ese Shaw	April 7, 2023	JURY102
The jurors are brought to the hotel where they are to be sequestered and get to know one another over tasks such as ordering meals. Opening arguments take place in the trial, about a garment factory employee who has defecated on shirts. The prosecution presents an animated video depicting the incident, which the defense tries to counter with a video of its own, but it cannot get it to play properly. A juror is injured by a falling shelf and taken away for medical care, causing an alternate to be promoted.
3	3	"Foreperson"	Jake Szymanski	Marcos Gonzalez	April 7, 2023	JURY103
Gladden is made the foreperson of the jury. Todd arrives to court wearing a pair of modified crutches being used as "chair pants". Witnesses are called, who testify to the defendant being a bum. Gladden is tasked with keeping Barbara from dozing off.
4	4	"Field Trip"	Jake Szymanski	Andrew Weinberg	April 7, 2023	JURY104
The jury is given a tour of the factory where the incident took place. Gladden finds marks on the floor where barrels appear to have been suspiciously moved, and later enters a room with a chemical odor and T-shirts. The jury has dinner at a Margaritaville restaurant, during which Noah accidentally becomes drunk and breaks up with his girlfriend, who is strongly suspected of cheating on him.
5	5	"Ineffective Assistance"	Jake Szymanski	Mekki Leeper	April 14, 2023	JURY105
In the face of ineffective counsel, the defendant opts to represent himself. At the hotel, Marsden has Gladden help him rehearse lines for an audition and take the blame for clogging his hotel room's toilet. Gladden wingmans for Noah, who hooks up with Jeannie.
6	6	"Closing Arguments"	Jake Szymanski	Kerry O'Neill	April 14, 2023	JURY106
Gladden plays a game of yut with Ken, who loses and owes him $2,000 (due to a multiplier), which he refuses to take. The jury hears closing arguments in the case, during which the defendant is blocked from testifying about his alleged chemical exposure because it was not part of discovery. Marsden is denied a role in the film he was auditioning for. The jury holds a birthday party for Ross at Hazeltine Park, but Marsden, thinking it is a pity party for him, angrily destroys the cake.
7	7	"Deliberations"	Jake Szymanski	Evan Williams	April 21, 2023	JURY107
The jury enters the deliberations phase. They are initially split, but Gladden persuades them to arrive at a not liable verdict, which he delivers to the judge, who then reveals to him that the trial was faked.
8	8	"The Verdict"	Jake Szymanski	N/A	April 21, 2023	JURY108
Gladden is given a behind-the-scenes tour of how the trial was staged and the show was filmed.

=== Season 2: Company Retreat (2026) ===
No. overall	No. in season	Title	Directed by	Written by	Original release date	Prod. code
9	1	"Onboarding"	Jake Szymanski	Anthony King	March 20, 2026	PALM101
Due to a failed marriage proposal to Amy, Kevin departs on the first day of the retreat and Anthony is left in charge of festivities.
10	2	"Team Building"	Jake Szymanski	Andrew Weinberg	March 20, 2026	PALM102
The group try to earn back the trust of retreat owner Marjorie by searching for missing snacks. Amy makes a bucket list.
11	3	"Soft Launch"	Jake Szymanski	Albertina Rizzo	March 20, 2026	PALM103
Dougie Jr. is officially announced as new CEO at the client cookout, though his new sauce has presentation and recipe faults.
12	4	"Accountability"	Jake Szymanski	Asmita Paranjape & Rachel Hein	March 27, 2026	PALM104
Dougie runs away during a motivational talk, leaving the group to delay pool day and search for him.
13	5	"Offsite"	Jake Szymanski	Kerry O'Neill & Alex Kavutskiy	March 27, 2026	PALM105
Doug explores selling to a private equity group. Kate draws first blood in the Dougcathlon. A hypnotist reveals secrets which threaten the deal.
14	6	"Culture Fit"	Jake Szymanski	Chris Kula	April 3, 2026	PALM106
Kevin conducts HR interviews as Amy had a casual sexual encounter with "other" Anthony. The investors bring Sia to perform at the talent show.
15	7	"Mergers & Acquisitions"	Jake Szymanski	Anthony King	April 3, 2026	PALM107
A ten-year-old time capsule is opened, showing the close bonds of the co-workers. Anthony is sent back and forth as the deal signing is delayed; he overhears the investors true intentions and convinces Doug to reject the sale.
16	8	"Employee Review"	Jake Szymanski	Anthony King	April 3, 2026	PALM108
The hoax is revealed to Anthony, who is given a behind-the-scenes tour interspersed with production clips.

== Production ==
On September 15, 2022, it was reported that a semi-improvised docu-style comedy series starring James Marsden and a group of up-and-coming actors with improv backgrounds had secretly been filmed for Amazon Studios. The 17-day shoot was filmed in a real courtroom south of Los Angeles. According to executive producer Todd Schulman, Jury Duty began as an attempt to make a sitcom like The Office about a trial, with a real person at the center of the show who does not know that he is surrounded by actors. Creators Lee Eisenberg and Gene Stupnitsky both previously worked as writer-producers on The Office.

In order to find a non-actor for the show's lead, an ad was put up on Craigslist. Marsden stars as an alternate version of himself, alongside other actors including Alan Barinholtz, Susan Berger, Cassandra Blair, and Rashida Olayiwola. Marsden was offered his part traditionally. Over 1000 actors submitted to be on the jury with an additional 500 for the judge, prosecutors and defenders – with production wanting people with legal backgrounds for these parts. After the initial self tapes for the jury, finalists such as Berger, Edi Modica, Mekki Leeper, Blair (who also was considered for the part of the bailiff), Ron Song, Whitney Rice (who ended up as the plaintiff) and others were given character prompts and intermixed into a focus group where they would interact with regular people and each other as their promoted characters. Kirk Fox was initially supposed to have more screentime and interactions with Ronald Gladden, but Fox was directed to stay clear of Gladden when production became aware that Gladden was a fan of Parks and Recreation, a show Fox was featured on.

In February 2025, the second season was confirmed to have already been filmed. On May 11, 2026, the series was renewed for a third season.

== Release ==
The series' first four episodes premiered on Amazon Freevee on April 7, 2023, and the fifth and sixth episodes followed on April 14. The final two episodes, including the season finale, were released on April 21, 2023. The second season premiered on March 20, 2026, on Amazon Prime Video.

== Reception ==
=== Critical response ===
The review aggregator website Rotten Tomatoes reported an 84% approval rating based on 37 critic reviews. The website's critics consensus reads, "While this courtroom comedy isn't as tedious as actual jury duty – largely thanks to a very game James Marsden – the verdict is still out on whether its stylistic gambit pays off." Metacritic gave the first season a weighted average score of 51 out of 100 based on seven critic reviews, indicating "mixed or average" reviews.

Rendy Jones of RogerEbert.com called the series "a solid workplace comedy that tells a resonant story of community, delightfully unpacking how it's not just about serving in this world but who you're serving with." Charles Bramesco of The Guardian gave the series 2 out of 5 stars, writing, "With the head of a hidden-camera prank show, the heart of a workplace sitcom, and the body of a true crime documentary, the boundary-blurring new comedy Jury Duty makes for an odd chimera of genres."

The second season received positive reviews. Rotten Tomatoes reported a 92% approval rating based on 26 critic reviews. Metacritic gave the second season a weighted average score of 71 out of 100 based on 13 critic reviews, indicating "generally favorable" reviews.

=== Accolades ===
Award	Year	Category	Nominee(s)	Result	Ref.
American Film Institute Awards	2023	Television Program of the Year	Jury Duty	Won	
Critics' Choice Television Awards	2023	Best Supporting Actor in a Comedy Series	James Marsden	Nominated	
Golden Globe Awards	2023	Best Television Series – Musical or Comedy	Jury Duty	Nominated	
Golden Globe Awards	2023	Best Supporting Actor – Series, Miniseries or Television Film	James Marsden	Nominated	
Hollywood Critics Association TV Awards	2023	Best Streaming Series, Comedy	Jury Duty	Nominated	
Hollywood Critics Association TV Awards	2023	Best Supporting Actor in a Streaming Series, Comedy	James Marsden	Won	
Independent Spirit Awards	2023	Best Ensemble Cast in a New Scripted Series	Alan Barinholtz, Susan Berger, Cassandra Blair, David Brown, Kirk Fox, Ross Kimball, Pramode Kumar, Trisha LaFache, Mekki Leeper, James Marsden, Edy Modica, Kerry O’Neill, Rashida Olayiwola, Whitney Rice, Maria Russell, Ishmel Sahid, Ben Seaward, Ron Song, and Evan Williams	Won	
Independent Spirit Awards	2023	Best New Scripted Series	Jury Duty	Nominated	
Peabody Awards	2023	Entertainment Honoree	Jury Duty	Won	
Primetime Creative Arts Emmy Awards	2023	Outstanding Casting for a Comedy Series	Susie Farris	Nominated	
Primetime Emmy Awards	2023	Outstanding Comedy Series	Jury Duty	Nominated	
Primetime Emmy Awards	2023	Outstanding Supporting Actor in a Comedy Series	James Marsden	Nominated	
Primetime Emmy Awards	2023	Outstanding Writing for a Comedy Series	Mekki Leeper (for "Ineffective Assistance")	Nominated	
Primetime Emmy Awards	2026	Outstanding Writing for a Comedy Series	Anthony King (for "Mergers & Acquisitions")	Nominated	
Producers Guild of America Awards	2023	Outstanding Producer of Episodic Television, Comedy	Jury Duty	Nominated	
TCA Awards	2023	Outstanding New Program	Jury Duty	Nominated	
TCA Awards	2023	Individual Achievement in Comedy	James Marsden	Nominated	
TCA Awards	2023	Outstanding Achievement in Reality Programming	Jury Duty	Won	
Writers Guild of America Awards	2023	Comedy Series	Tanner Bean, Lee Eisenberg, Marcos Gonzalez, Cody Heller, Mekki Leeper, Katrina Mathewson, Kerry O’Neill, Ese Shaw, Gene Stupnitsky, Andrew Weinberg, Evan Williams	Nominated	
Writers Guild of America Awards	2023	New Series	Tanner Bean, Lee Eisenberg, Marcos Gonzalez, Cody Heller, Mekki Leeper, Katrina Mathewson, Kerry O’Neill, Ese Shaw, Gene Stupnitsky, Andrew Weinberg, Evan Williams	Nominated	

== See also ==
- The Joe Schmo Show – a similar hoax show, set around the production of a reality show.
- Invasion Iowa – a reality television hoax show.
- Living the Dream (New Zealand TV series) – a reality television hoax show
