= South Side (TV series) =

American sitcom

- Official promotional poster
- Genre: Sitcom
- Created by: Diallo Riddle; Bashir Salahuddin; Sultan Salahuddin
- Starring: Sultan Salahuddin; Kareme Young; Quincy Young; Chandra Russell; Bashir Salahuddin; Diallo Riddle; Lil Rel Howery; Zuri Salahuddin
- Theme music composer: Sasha Go Hard
- Composer: Daniel D. Crawford
- Country of origin: United States
- Original language: English
- No. of seasons: 3
- No. of episodes: 28

Production
- Executive producers: Michael Blieden; Will A. Miles; Diallo Riddle; Bashir Salahuddin
- Running time: 22 minutes
- Production companies: Emerald Street; The Riddle Entertainment Group; Jax Media; Comedy Partners; MTV Entertainment Studios

Original release
- Network: Comedy Central
- Release: July 24 – September 18, 2019
- Network: HBO Max
- Release: November 11, 2021 – December 29, 2022

South Side is an American sitcom created by Bashir Salahuddin and Diallo Riddle. Filmed and set in the Englewood area of Chicago, it follows two friends (portrayed by Sultan Salahuddin and Kareme Young) who recently graduated from community college and are seeking business success while working at a rent-to-own shop. The show premiered on Comedy Central on July 24, 2019. In August 2019, the series was renewed for a 10-episode second season. The series moved to HBO Max for its second season on November 11, 2021, making the series a "Max Original". The second season premiered on November 11, 2021. In February 2022, the series was renewed for a third season, which premiered on December 8, 2022. In February 2023, the series was cancelled after three seasons.

== Premise ==
South Side centers on "a pair of newly minted community college graduates and small-time hustlers who are always cooking up some petty scheme from black market Viagra to street corner popcorn — with an eye toward upward mobility".

== Cast ==
=== Main ===
- Sultan Salahuddin as Simon James
- Kareme Young as Kareme Odom
- Chandra Russell as Sergeant Turner
- Bashir Salahuddin as Officer Goodnight

=== Recurring ===
- Lil Rel Howery as Terrence Bishop
- Zuri Salahuddin as Stacy
- Quincy Young as Quincy Odom
- Langston Kerman as Adam Bethune
- Diallo Riddle as Allen Gayle
- Nefetari Spencer as Keisha
- Will Miles as Jay-Mal
- Lanre Idewu as Greg the Marine
- Jelani Lofton as Teddy
- Edward Williams III as Travis
- Aaron J. Hart as Aaron
- Rashawn Nadine Scott as Kitty Goodnight
- Michael Brunlieb as Chase Novak
- Ronald L. Conner as Bluto
- Antoine McKay as Uncle Spike
- LaRoyce Hawkins as Michael "Shaw" Owens
- Cole Keriazakos as Josh Goodnight

=== Guest ===
- Nathaniel "Earthquake" Stroman
- Jeff Tweedy
- LisaRaye McCoy
- Kel Mitchell
- Ed Lover
- Deon Cole (season 2)
- Chance the Rapper (seasons 2, 3)
- Vic Mensa (seasons 2, 3)
- Dreezy (season 2)
- Sommore (season 2)
- Rhymefest (season 2)
- Furly Mac as Sensei Terry (season 2)
- Cordae (season 3)
- Donell Jones (season 3)
- Adele Givens (season 3)

== Episodes ==
=== Series overview ===
| Season | Episodes | Originally released | | |
| Season | Episodes | First released | Last released | Network |
|---|---|---|---|---|
| 1 | 10 | July 24, 2019 | September 18, 2019 | Comedy Central |
| 2 | 10 | November 11, 2021 | November 25, 2021 | HBO Max |
| 3 | 8 | December 8, 2022 | December 29, 2022 | HBO Max |

=== Season 1 (2019) ===
| No. overall | No. in season | Title | Directed by | Written by | Original release date | U.S. viewers (millions) |
|---|---|---|---|---|---|---|
| 1 | 1 | "Xbox" | Michael Blieden | Bashir Salahuddin, Diallo Riddle & Sultan Salahuddin | July 24, 2019 | 0.256 |
| 2 | 2 | "Sell Yourself" | Michael Blieden | Bashir Salahuddin & Diallo Riddle | July 31, 2019 | 0.279 |
| 3 | 3 | "Turner Buys a Building" | Michael Blieden | Bashir Salahuddin & Diallo Riddle | August 7, 2019 | 0.316 |
| 4 | 4 | "The Day the Jordans Drop" | Michael Blieden | Langston Kerman | August 14, 2019 | 0.277 |
| 5 | 5 | "Cold Cases" | Michael Blieden | Chauncey B. Raglin-Washington & Bennett Walsh | August 21, 2019 | 0.241 |
| 6 | 6 | "Mongolian Curly" | Michael Blieden | Chandra Russell | August 28, 2019 | 0.262 |
| 7 | 7 | "Chi-town" | Michael Blieden | Sultan Salahuddin | September 4, 2019 | 0.311 |
| 8 | 8 | "Weird White Murderer" | Michael Blieden | Alisha Cowan | September 11, 2019 | 0.246 |
| 9 | 9 | "Mild Sauce Meatballs" | Michael Blieden | Will Miles | September 18, 2019 | 0.210 |
| 10 | 10 | "Litcoin" | Michael Blieden | Michael Blieden | September 18, 2019 | 0.199 |

=== Season 2 (2021) ===
| No. overall | No. in season | Title | Directed by | Written by | Original release date |
|---|---|---|---|---|---|
| 11 | 1 | "Treat Yourself" | Michael Blieden | Alisha Cowan | November 11, 2021 |
| 12 | 2 | "Ambulance" | Michael Blieden | Bashir Salahuddin & Diallo Riddle | November 11, 2021 |
| 13 | 3 | "The Election" | Ismail Salahuddin | Langston Kerman | November 11, 2021 |
| 14 | 4 | "Turner's and Brenda's Day Off" | Michael Blieden | Chandra Russell & Alisha Cowan | November 18, 2021 |
| 15 | 5 | "Life of an Ottoman" | Michael Blieden | Bennett Walsh | November 18, 2021 |
| 16 | 6 | "Chicago's #1 Party Promoter" | Michael Blieden | Will Miles | November 18, 2021 |
| 17 | 7 | "Face Your Fears" | Michael Blieden | Sultan Salahuddin | November 25, 2021 |
| 18 | 8 | "Tornado" | Bashir Salahuddin & Diallo Riddle | Michael Blieden | November 25, 2021 |
| 19 | 9 | "10 Less Minutes" | Michael Blieden | Bashir Salahuddin, Diallo Riddle & Zuri Salahuddin | November 25, 2021 |
| 20 | 10 | "Sarcophacouch" | Michael Blieden | Chandra Russell | November 25, 2021 |

=== Season 3 (2022) ===
| No. overall | No. in season | Title | Directed by | Written by | Original release date |
|---|---|---|---|---|---|
| 21 | 1 | "Heartless" | Michael Blieden | Bashir Salahuddin, Diallo Riddle & Rashida Olayiwola | December 8, 2022 |
| 22 | 2 | "College" | Michael Blieden | Michael Blieden | December 8, 2022 |
| 23 | 3 | "The Laughter" | Bashir Salahuddin & Diallo Riddle | Bennett Walsh | December 15, 2022 |
| 24 | 4 | "South Suburbs" | Michael Blieden | Chandra Russell | December 15, 2022 |
| 25 | 5 | "The Spirt of Kwanzaa" | Michael Blieden | Zuri Salahuddin & Lauren Walker | December 22, 2022 |
| 26 | 6 | "DJ Alderman" | Britt Boardman | Will Miles | December 22, 2022 |
| 27 | 7 | "Super Speed" | Ismail Salahuddin | Alisha Cowan | December 29, 2022 |
| 28 | 8 | "Littlepalooza" | Michael Blieden | Sultan Salahuddin | December 29, 2022 |

== Production ==
=== Development ===
Title screen of season 1

On October 17, 2017, it was announced that Comedy Central had ordered the pilot for South Side from creators Bashir Salahuddin and Diallo Riddle, writing alums from Late Night with Jimmy Fallon. The two also serve as executive producers and co-stars. On May 16, 2019, it was announced that the series would premiere on July 24, 2019.

Showrunners Salahuddin and Riddle stated that South Side was created to portray the South Side of Chicago where Bashir Salahuddin grew up and to show that "[t]here is joy on the South Side and the many Chicagoans who made this show, both in front of and behind the camera, are eager to share that joy." The show is set in Englewood and features local actors and production members from Chicago.

=== Casting ===
Sultan Salahuddin, cast in the lead role of Simon, is the brother of show creator Bashir Salahuddin. Bashir plays Officer Goodnight opposite his real-life wife, Chandra Russell, who portrays Sergeant Turner. Sultan's co-lead, Kareme Young, is the real-life twin brother of cast member Quincy Young, who also plays his brother on the show. Other cast members and guest stars include Chicago natives Lil Rel Howery, Nathaniel "Earthquake" Stroman, LisaRaye McCoy, Chance the Rapper, and Kel Mitchell.

=== Release ===
South Side premiered on July 24, 2019. On August 28, 2019, Comedy Central renewed the series for a 10-episode second season. On August 13, 2020, it was reported that the series' first season was set to be streaming on HBO Max in 2021 and the series moved to HBO Max in November 2021, making the series a "Max Original". The second season was released on November 11, 2021. On February 8, 2022, HBO Max renewed the series for a third season. On February 21, 2023, HBO Max cancelled the series after three seasons.

== Reception ==
South Side received positive critical reception. The first season of the show has a score of 79/100 on review aggregator Metacritic, indicating "generally favorable reviews". Writing for Vanity Fair, Laura Bradley stated: "The writers worked to imbue the series with a diverse cast of characters whose values, socioeconomic status, and ambitions varied widely...the thing all of the show's main characters have in common is their drive." Tambay Obenson wrote in a review for IndieWire, "The creators and cast know this world intimately, and instead of turning their camera on the usual crime and poverty, they find the humor that exists within the mayhem."

Season 2 holds a 100% on review aggregator Rotten Tomatoes based on six critics' reviews.

== Awards and nominations ==
| Year | Award | Category | Nominee | Result | Ref. |
|---|---|---|---|---|---|
| 2022 | Black Reel Awards | Outstanding Guest Actor, Comedy Series | Lil Rel Howery | Nominated | |
| 2022 | Black Reel Awards | Outstanding Comedy Series | Bashir Salahuddin, Diallo Riddle | Nominated | |
| 2022 | NAACP Image Awards | Outstanding Directing in a Comedy Series | Bashir Salahuddin, Diallo Riddle (for "Tornado") | Won | |

== Other media ==
On September 4, 2019, Comedy Central and WBEZ Chicago launched South Side Stories, a podcast collaboration that centers the real-life people and places that inspired the series.
