= St. Denis Medical =

American mockumentary sitcom (2024–present)

- Genre: Mockumentary sitcom; Workplace comedy; Comedy verite
- Created by: Eric Ledgin & Justin Spitzer
- Starring: Wendi McLendon-Covey; Allison Tolman; Josh Lawson; Kahyun Kim; Mekki Leeper; David Alan Grier; Kaliko Kauahi
- Music by: Matthew Blitzer
- Country of origin: United States
- Original language: English
- No. of seasons: 3
- No. of episodes: 39

Production
- Executive producers: Eric Ledgin; Justin Spitzer; Simon Heuer; Ruben Fleischer; Bridget Kyle & Vicky Luu
- Producer: Meg Schave
- Cinematography: Jay Hunter; Justin Duval
- Editors: James Renfroe; Christian Kinnard; Elizabeth Praino; Missy Hernandez; Sascha Stanton-Craven; Emily Trio; Tana Plaengprawat
- Camera setup: Single-camera
- Production companies: More Bees, Inc.; Spitzer Holding Company; Universal Television

Original release
- Network: NBC
- Release: November 12, 2024 – present

St. Denis Medical is an American television mockumentary sitcom created by Justin Spitzer and Eric Ledgin. The series follows the overworked doctors and nurses at an underfunded Oregon hospital. Wendi McLendon-Covey, Allison Tolman, Josh Lawson, Mekki Leeper, Kahyun Kim, Kaliko Kauahi, and David Alan Grier star. St. Denis Medical premiered on November 12, 2024, on NBC. In January 2025, the series was renewed for a second season which premiered on November 3, 2025. In February 2026, the series was renewed for a third season which premiered on November 2, 2026.

== Synopsis ==
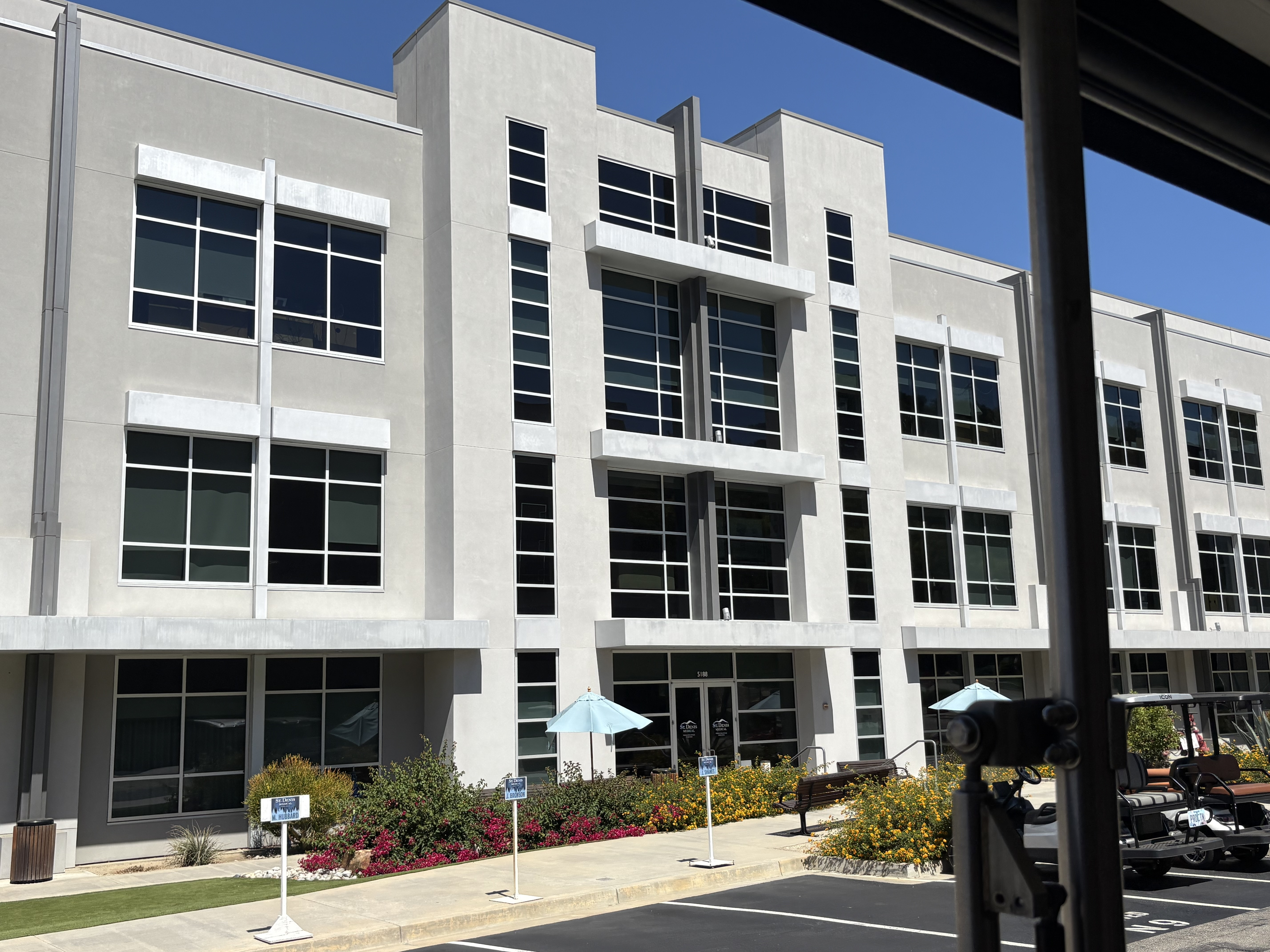
St. Denis Regional Medical Center at Universal Studios Lot, taken on Studio Tour

Per The Hollywood Reporter, "At St. Denis Regional Medical Center, the dedicated doctors and nurses are trying their best to treat patients while maintaining their own sanity."

== Cast and characters ==
=== Main ===
- Wendi McLendon-Covey as Joyce Henderson, the ambitious, kooky executive director of St. Denis Medical, her medical specialty was oncology.
- Allison Tolman as Alex Mazurkian, an empathetic supervising nurse with workaholic tendencies
- Josh Lawson as Bruce Schweitz, a cocky trauma surgeon desperately seeking adulation
- Kahyun Kim as Serena Jung, a self-assured travel nurse with a wild streak.
- Mekki Leeper as Matt Pearson, a newly-hired registered nurse from a religious community in Montana
- David Alan Grier as Ronald “Ron” Leonard, a curmudgeonly emergency physician
- Kaliko Kauahi (Note: Kauahi is credited as guest starring on the first episode, but is credited as a part of the starring cast starting from episode 2.) as Val Kealani, a nurse administrator and surly, no-nonsense veteran of St. Denis

=== Recurring ===
- David Theune as Keith, a patient care tech
- Stephen Schneider as Chaplain Steve, the hospital chaplain
- Kyle Bornheimer as Tim, Alex's husband
- Steve Little as Sanderson, Joyce's ex-boyfriend
- Ariana Madix as Dr. Brooke Emerson (season 2-3), Bruce's ex-girlfriend who is a cardiac surgeon
- Dan Leahy as Brandon, a young nurse
- Jonathan Slavin as Parker, a nurse
- Alexandra Ford as Holly, a nurse
- Emma Pope as Dakota, a nurse

=== Guest ===
- Mindy Sterling as Laurie (season 1), a patient at St. Denis
- Lynn Whitfield as Barb (season 1), a patient's grandmother interested in dating Ron
- Nico Santos as Rene, an experienced RN who is a "mean girl"
- Erinn Hayes as Dr. Stephanie Taylor (season 1), a surgeon
- David Paymer as Bob (season 1), a patient at St. Denis
- Rose Abdoo as Debbie (season 1), a nurse at St. Denis who Joyce tasks Alex with firing
- Dee Dee Rescher as Ruth (season 1), an unhoused patient
- Haneefah Wood as Megan (season 1), a friend of Joyce
- Draymond Green as Lightning Patient (season 2)
- Lauren Weedman as Pam (season 2), an abrasive charge nurse that Alex used to work for
- Jessica Lowe as Violet (season 2), Matt's ex-wife
- Wayne Knight as Dr. Felix Axler, an Interventional Cardiologist at St. Denis (season 2)
- Kristen Schaal as Ashley Lawrence (season 2), Sanderson's new girlfriend who is hired as the hospital's midwife
- Sam Richardson as Michael (season 2), Ron's son
- Damon Wayans as Dr. Highland (season 3), Ron's temporary replacement

== Episodes ==
=== Series overview ===
Season	Episodes	Originally released	
Season	Episodes	First released	Last released
1	18	November 12, 2024	April 29, 2025
2	18	November 3, 2025	April 6, 2026
3	18	November 2, 2026	TBA

=== Season 1 (2024–25) ===
No. overall	No. in season	Title	Directed by	Written by	Original release date	U.S. viewers (millions)
1	1	"Welcome to St. Denis"	Ruben Fleischer	Eric Ledgin & Justin Spitzer	November 12, 2024	3.75
St. Denis Medical, an underfunded hospital in Oregon, welcomes a new nurse, Matt. During his first day at St. Denis, he tries to impress his co-workers and boss. Alex insists to Ron that she will leave on time but keeps finding reasons to stay late. Meanwhile, Joyce purchases an expensive new mammography machine before deciding to return it.
2	2	"A Very Robust Personal Life"	Ruben Fleischer	Sierra Teller Ornelas & Owen Ellickson	November 12, 2024	3.05
When a friend of Joyce's passes away, she has trouble keeping her work and personal lives separate. She attempts to let Alex and others express aspects of their personal lives, only to find that it disrupts work. Elsewhere, a patient tries to set Ron up with her grandmother.
3	3	"Weird Stuff You Can't Explain"	Matt Sohn	Hunter Toro	November 19, 2024	3.11
When a religious patient delays surgery until the arrival of her cross, Ron decries superstition in medicine and declares a hex on the hospital. Val struggles to carry the oversized cross to the hospital room, Bruce becomes interested in astrology, and Matt questions the qualifications of Chaplain Steve.
4	4	"Salamat You Too"	Jason Woliner	Bridget Kyle & Vicky Luu	November 26, 2024	2.66
Alex encounters resistance from the "Filipino Mafia", a catty group of employees, after she rearranges their schedules. Bruce is featured as employee of the quarter, and Ron leaves a note on Serena's car, starting a petty war between them.
5	5	"A Peanut and Caramel-Filled Miracle"	Matt Sohn	Justin Shanes	December 3, 2024	2.74
Bruce and Ron get involved in an escalating spat about a NutRageous candy bar, with both going out of their way to declare who needs the candy bar more. Joyce instructs Alex to fire an underperforming employee, which proves to be difficult, while Matt struggles with a lack of appreciation from patients.
6	6	"Ho-Ho-Hollo"	Heather Jack	Kyle Mack	December 17, 2024	2.75
It's Christmas at St. Denis and Alex and Ron discover that a patient has been lying about having cancer to keep close with his family. Serena helps Joyce improve St. Denis' social media presence. Elsewhere, Bruce and Matt help a patient dressed as Santa who has an engagement ring stuck around his penis, following a failed proposal attempt.
7	7	"50 cc's of Kindness"	Christine Gernon	Emman Sadorra	January 14, 2025	2.75
Upon learning that another hospital has a higher percentage rate of donating blood, Joyce instructs that each staff member donate. This proves to be a challenge for Bruce, who tries to donate blood using a fake arm. Elsewhere, Matt and Alex try to help a pair of prison inmates get along, while Joyce flirts with the corrections officer.
8	8	"Gimme the Scuttlebutt"	Shahrzad Davani	Bridget Kyle & Vicky Luu	January 21, 2025	2.47
When Joyce learns that she is out-of-the-loop on workplace gossip, she finds ways to forcefully insert herself into drama. Alex becomes self-conscious about her sex life with her husband Tim, setting off a desperate effort by the couple to have sex. Meanwhile, Bruce tests a new policy about dating co-workers, and is put off when Val states that she would not have sex with him.
9	9	"You Got to Have a Plan"	Bill Benz	Naomi Ekperigin	January 28, 2025	2.35
Joyce asks Alex to be the executor of her estate after she passes away, which later proves to be a complicated job. Alex puts the work onto Ron, and vice-versa, until both are forced to confront the problem. Hopeful to get close to Serena, Matt helps her deal with a bickering family. Bruce has unexpected DNA test results, and worries about his future.
10	10	"People Just Say Stuff Online"	Ken Whittingham	Eric Ledgin & Justin Spitzer	February 4, 2025	2.41
When Ron upsets a patient, Joyce invites them back after initiating a new policy that the staff be more mindful with their choice of words, even if it affects their health. Bruce confronts his high school bully. Upon reading some of the reviews, Alex uncovers a bad review and insists that it is not written about her.
11	11	"Nobody Even Mentions the Brownies!"	Heather Jack	Justin Shanes	February 11, 2025	2.56
Joyce pushes the staff of St. Denis to upsell patients on non-critical hospital procedures, with the contest winners receiving floor seats to SZA. Matt teams up with Serena, hoping to attend the concert with her. Meanwhile, Alex takes pity on an unhoused patient and employs deception to set her up in the new V.I.P. suite. Bruce and Ron put aside their differences to fix a broken pipe.
12	12	"Buffalo Bruce and Matty the Kid"	Heather Jack	Naomi Ekperigin	February 18, 2025	2.39
When a patients emotional support cat runs loose through St. Denis, Joyce, Bruce and Matt team up to catch it. With the looming threat of a black death disease infecting the cat, they try and keep the situation lowkey. Alex celebrates Serena's birthday, accidentally setting off a series of emotions that have Serena question why she has been at St. Denis for so long.
13	13	"Some Famous Internet Guy"	Phil Traill	Dan White	February 25, 2025	2.31
Joyce hires popular internet singer Colby Twil to entertain the children patients at St Denis. As Bruce tries to impress Colby, Ron notices a bulge on Colby's neck and recommends he get it tested. While waiting for his results Matt and the other staff put on an impromptu talent show. Serena must stall a local reporter to prevent him from leaving before Colby takes the stage. Alex tries to impress her daughter Ella.
14	14	"Listen to Your Ladybugs"	Bill Benz	Teleplay by : Kyle Mack; Story by : Hunter Toro & Justin Shanes	March 11, 2025	2.26
Joyce launches a mammogram initiative and Alex and Serena must step up when Joyce's initial results cause her boyfriend to panic and flee. Ron deals with a patient who has all the answers thanks to the internet and AI, while Matt spins out about a toe injury. A repeated comment from an elderly patient with echolalia causes Bruce to have an existential crisis.
15	15	"Sometimes It's Good to Be Cautious"	Heather Jack	Jeremy Bronson & Hunter Toro	March 25, 2025	2.43
Alex and Bruce disagree on how to inform a young athlete on the risks of a shoulder surgery. Serena and Matt almost drop a patient. Serena says there is nothing to tell, while Matt feels guilty. Ron tries watch a basketball game. Joyce worries about her professional accomplishments when she learns she will be sharing space in her university's alumni magazine with Tiger Woods.
16	16	"Anything to Push Zaluva"	Randall Winston	Jordan Hearne	April 1, 2025	2.11
Ron taunts Joyce that Megan, a pharmaceutical sales representative, is not really Joyce's friend. Joyce sets out to prove him wrong but spirals when he seems right. Ron is then tempted by the offered perks. Alex struggles to let Serena arrange the baby shower for another coworker. Bruce decides to mentor Matt to increase Matt's confidence.
17	17	"Bruce-ic and the Mus-ic"	Trent O'Donnell	Bridget Kyle & Vicky Luu	April 22, 2025	2.07
The staff attend St Denis' annual fundraising gala. Ron and Joyce battle over hosting duties and end up roasting each other. Bruce enters the dance competition solo, determined to win after years of placing second. Serena is one of the dance judges. Alex brings her husband Tim for a childless night, though they disagree about having a third baby. Matt ends up spending most of the night in line at the bar though eats with Serena afterwards.
18	18	"This Place Is Our Everything"	Jeffrey Blitz	Eric Ledgin	April 29, 2025	2.12
A major storm causes St Denis to be packed with patients and understaffed. Alex comes in on her day off to support Tim's vasectomy and is conflicted between her work and her family. Joyce's recent windfall of money for the hospital causes her to approve too much. Ron and Bruce compete for big purchases, but a moment of reflection with Ron causes Joyce to commit to her original idea of a birthing center. Serena tries to find out Matt's type of woman to set him up with someone else, though Val reveals to her that Matt has feelings for Serena herself.

=== Season 2 (2025–26) ===
No. overall	No. in season	Title	Directed by	Written by	Original release date	U.S. viewers (millions)
19	1	"Aloha, Everyone"	Matt Sohn	Eric Ledgin & Kyle Mack	November 3, 2025	2.55
Months later, Alex returns from a Hawaiian vacation determined to keep her chill vibe, even at work, though Ron is offended by her gift for him. Serena finds out Matt requested a different work zone to avoid her and confronts him. He apologizes but says the time apart helped him get over his crush on her. Bruce is annoyed when a patient struck by lightning takes attention off his new tattoo. Joyce panics when the donation benefactor wants to come in and see how the birthing center is progressing.
20	2	"Mama Bear Activated"	Richie Keen	Bridget Kyle & Vicky Luu	November 3, 2025	2.10
When Bruce is attacked in the parking lot, the staff raise fears about the trend of attacks on healthcare workers. Joyce must calm them, with creative tactics as there is no money to upgrade security. Matt tries to help Bruce, who is in denial about his trauma. Ron injures himself when bragging to Serena about his physical strength. Alex calls the local news to discuss the attack only be derailed when it is discovered a wild goose was the one who attacked Bruce.
21	3	"Get Me in the Pod, Brother"	Tristram Shapeero	Justin Shanes	November 10, 2025	2.32
Joyce brings in a new cutting edge body scanner that the staff can use once for free. Bruce is alarmed when his spine shows some minor curvature and Matt's spine is perfect. Joyce soon regrets the noise and radiation from the machine being right next to her office. Alex and Ron disagree about open communication in relationships, making things awkward when including her husband Tim and Serena.
22	4	"Two Docs, One Conf"	Yana Gorskaya	Owen Ellickson	November 17, 2025	2.28
Ron and Bruce are sent to a medical conference at a hotel. Bruce annoys Ron the whole time but Ron ends up looking bad. While trying to make amends, Bruce hurts himself with drunken antics because of what Ron said. At the hospital, during Nurses Appreciation Week, the staff vote for one nurse to receive the Gentle Heart Award. Alex wants to vote for Matt as a nice gesture but is conflicted when the prize comes with a waterpark trip she could send her kids on. Joyce is deeply upset when someone throws away a decorative rock she gave the nurses and Serena must figure out how to avoid being caught.
23	5	"A Strong Cup of Coffee"	Heather Jack	Hunter Toro	November 24, 2025	2.43
Alex is excited when her old mentor, Pam, comes out of retirement but Pam's abrasive nature scares the staff, particularly Bruce. Matt and Serena team up to find out the cause of a patient's sudden bouts of narcolepsy. Joyce annoys Ron and Val after realizing Ron doesn't care about celebrity deaths.
24	6	"I Left a Woman on the Table"	Bill Benz	Eric Ledgin & Kyle Mack	December 1, 2025	N/A
Matt's ex-wife Violet shows up to win him back, shocking everyone. Since she grew up not believing in medical science Matt must string her along until she gets her gallbladder removed. Serena is uncomfortable while Ron considers Matt's old way of life. Joyce joins the team on the floor to prove they can increase their patient discharge numbers without hiring more nurses. Alex and Val try to slow her down. Bruce tries to get back with his ex, Dr. Emerson, but she is currently seeing Chaplain Steve.
25	7	"No Wonder His Kidney Wants Out"	Randall Keenan Winston	Jeremy Bronson	December 8, 2025	N/A
A man who wishes to donate his kidney to his brother anonymously, causes Alex, Ron and Serena to debate if an action can be truly selfless. Alex tries donating anonymously to a dog's surgery for a coworker, but accidentally overpays. People believe the donation was from Ron, so Serena starts telling people Ron is willing to donate to various causes. A building inspector comes to review the birthing center and Joyce is convinced they went on a date five years ago. Bruce enlists Matt to find Bruce a male friend.
26	8	"A Waste of Time and Marble"	Heather Jack	Naomi Ekperigin	December 15, 2025	N/A
As Joyce starts making decisions quickly she offends Rene and much of the other nursing staff. As they consider a walk-out both the nurses and Joyce expect Alex to be their mole on the other side. Serena tries to explain labor disputes to Matt. Joyce's boyfriend Sanderson gets himself into the hospital trying to get her attention. Ron offers sensible choices to improve the relationship, but Sanderson and Bruce ignore them. Sanderson decides to propose and Joyce reluctantly says yes.
27	9	"You're in His Bubble Space"	Bill Benz	Emman Sadorra	January 5, 2026	N/A
Matt and Ron deal with a child that doesn't want a shot, and his parents who believe in gentle parenting. Ron reconsiders his relationship with his adult son. Alex has to help Joyce with wedding planning, but can see Joyce doesn't want to marry Sanderson. Joyce calls off the wedding, devastating him. Another nurse is interested in Matt, and Bruce picks up on Serena's jealousy. Bruce says that people like himself and Serena would never be good for someone like Matt, leading Serena to hook up with Chaplain Steve.
28	10	"This Is From Joyce"	Christine Gernon	Dan White	January 12, 2026	N/A
Serena brings Alex to assist in her Botox and Bubbly party for a group of women, though Alex has suspicions about the age of one of the youthful-looking guests and decides to do some ill-advised detective work. This sets off a chain of events where the hostess' dog accidentally ingests some of the Botox and Alex must claim she is on drugs to save Serena's business. Ron takes Bruce's advice and invests in a new cryptocurrency. Joyce has Matt go between her and Sanderson when returning his stuff, though she gets competitive trying to prove she is better off after the breakup. Joyce inadvertently causes Sanderson to have a meet-cute with another woman.
29	11	"This Isn't Bingo"	Claire Scanlon	Jordan Hearne	January 26, 2026	N/A
Alex hosts a Senior Health Fair but the old folks find Chaplain Steve's activities more fun. Ron is upset when the elderly lady that makes his favorite fudge decides to give it all to Matt. After Bruce unknowingly resuscitates a woman with a DNR in place, he and Joyce end up seeing themselves in her life story, making them self-conscious. Alex finds out that Serena and Chaplain Steve are hooking up.
30	12	"Nod and Agree"	Jay Hunter	Justin Shanes	February 2, 2026	N/A
Ron tries to have a perfect visit with his son Michael, by agreeing with everything Michael says. Things get awkward when Michael insists Ron report a confrontation with cardiologist Dr. Axler to Joyce. Alex deals with people lying to her, after Serena says Val didn't really have jury duty. Bruce wants to buy Matt's secret family juice recipe.
31	13	"A New Best Friend"	Heather Jack	Eric Ledgin & Owen Ellickson	March 2, 2026	N/A
Alex is alarmed when her husband Tim strikes up a friendship with Bruce. Serena must look after Joyce, who ate some psilocybin chocolate. Val taunts Ron about his new leather shoes squeaking. Matt tries to join Bruce and Chaplain's Steve's trivia team and Bruce finds out about Steve and Serena.
32	14	"Happy Birthday, Matty"	Bill Benz	Bridget Kyle & Vicky Luu	March 9, 2026	N/A
As Matt celebrates his birthday for the first time, he chooses an arcade. Joyce mistakenly thinks it's a different type of club, but hooks up with the younger arcade repairman, distracting Ron who just wants to get the high score on Space Invaders. Alex wants to play laser tag but is constantly prevented from it. Steve reveals he is dating Serena in front of everyone. Despite Bruce asking him to be nice to Matt, Steve taunts Matt, leading to a laser tag brawl. Serena dumps Steve.
33	15	"Everybody Loves Portland General"	Rory Kramer	Andy Kushnir	March 16, 2026	N/A
The rival hospital Portland General gives Bruce a job offer, shocking Joyce. She tries to counter but Bruce heads to speak with the staff at the other hospital. Upon making a fool of himself and learning that he would be at the bottom of the totem pole, he returns and makes another counter offer with Joyce. A baby is left with the nurses and Serena uses him to get out of work duties, though quickly is overwhelmed when he gets fussy and needs Alex's help. Matt helps recover Ron's computer password and speaks with Ron's ex-wife when their old joint email receives the reset password.
34	16	"Experience with Human Babies"	Ruben Fleischer	Kyle Mack	March 23, 2026	N/A
The birthing center is almost ready as Joyce and Alex search for a Head Midwife. Joyce is very reluctant when the best candidate is Ashley Lawrence, Sanderson's new girlfriend whom he met in front of Joyce. Joyce eventually hires her. Bruce accompanies Matt on an ambulance ride-along. He becomes trapped on an apartment ledge and encourages Matt to pursue Serena. Ron and Serena both claim ownership over the only good pen in the hospital.
35	17	"Here a Righteous Woman Comes"	Christine Gernon	Naomi Ekperigin & Jeremy Bronson	March 30, 2026	N/A
At the grand opening for the birthing center, Joyce's plans are derailed after she falls off stage while singing with the choir. Concussed, she complains to Alex what a mess her life is, which is heard by everyone at the ceremony through Joyce's documentary mic. Serena and Matt must pose as the first couple going to use the birthing center. Ron and Bruce get their yearly physicals, keeping Ron from a fishing trip. Ron is told he needs triple bypass surgery. Alex gives Joyce the chance to cut the ceremonial ribbon, but she leaves to see Ron. Serena and Matt kiss in the parking lot.
36	18	"We Make Time"	Matt Sohn	Eric Ledgin & Bridget Kyle & Vicky Luu	April 6, 2026	N/A
Ron awaits his surgery, telling no one but Joyce. After walking in on him in a compromising situation, Joyce reveals to Alex that Ron's surgery is imminent and that he does not want any visitors. Alex, who is busy organizing a get-well card and gifts for Ron, questions her bond with him. Bruce finds out Brooke spent the weekend in Las Vegas and worries about her ability to perform Ron's surgery. Matt attempts to talk to Serena about the awkwardness following their kiss, but they are continuously interrupted. Alex finds Ron alone in the stairwell, where Ron reveals he has not told his family about the surgery. Matt and Serena clear the air and agree to start seeing each other. Ron's surgery is successful. While recovering, he asks Alex and Bruce, "Where's my Joyce?"

=== Season 3 (2026) ===
No. overall	No. in season	Title	Directed by	Written by	Original release date	U.S. viewers (millions)
37	1	"He Ain't Noah Wyle"	Yana Gorskaya	Eric Ledgin & Bridget Kyle	November 2, 2026	TBD
Months later, everyone except Alex loves Ron's replacement Dr. Highland. Ron's recovery is going well though Bruce finds him and shows him around prompting Ron to consider leaving. Joyce is up for an award and makes the staff vote for her online. Serena and Matt are still together, Serena wants to avoid labels but officially makes Matt her boyfriend and tells him to stop going to the same church as another nurse. Alex asks Ron to come back, so he agrees. The documentary crew show Ron footage of him asking for Joyce.
38	2	"Is That a Dinosaur?"	Richie Keen	Justin Shanes	November 9, 2026	TBD
On Ron's first day back at work, Joyce directs Serena to give him only easy patients to avoid taxing his body. Ron jumps right into a complex case of a man bitten by an endangered snapping turtle. Val cashes in several IOUs with Alex so she can just chill for the day. Bruce feels insecure that he has no inside jokes in his relationship with Brooke and tries to manufacture some.
39	3	"Yo! St. D"	Yana Gorskaya	Matt Hubbard	November 16, 2026	TBD
A bunch of high schoolers visit St Denis. Alex and Ron argue over the difference between doctors and nurses, making the teens lose interest, though they win them back when a patient agrees to make their case seem more dramatic then it actually is. Bruce tries to mentor a social outcast though ends up being the joke when he is recorded injuring himself. Joyce recruits Matt to help her write a speech to impress the teens.
40	4	"The Intoxicating Aroma of True Love"	TBA	TBA	November 23, 2026	TBD
41	5	"Roads Not Taken"	TBA	TBA	December 7, 2026	TBD

== Production ==
=== Development ===
The pilot was commissioned by NBC in August 2022, with production taking place shortly before the 2023 Writers Guild of America strike. The series was given an official series order in June 2023.

The series is produced by Universal Television, a division of Universal Studio Group, and is executive produced by series creators Eric Ledgin and Justin Spitzer, with Spitzer under his Universal TV-based production banner Spitzer Holding Company, and Simon Heuer, Head of TV Development at Spitzer Holding Company.

St. Denis Medical was moved to the 2024–25 season due to strike-related production delays. In May 2024, it was announced that the series would air in fall 2024. In June 2024, the show received a full season order of 18 episodes. On January 14, 2025, NBC renewed the series for a second season. On February 2, 2026, NBC renewed the series for a third season.

=== Casting ===
Upon the pilot commission, it was confirmed that Wendi McLendon-Covey would lead the series as Joyce. In March 2023, Allison Tolman was cast in the pilot as Alex. Later that month, David Alan Grier, Josh Lawson, Mekki Leeper and Kahyun Kim were confirmed as series regulars before production of the pilot commenced. Kaliko Kauahi was announced as a cast member in March 2024. Stephen Schneider was announced as a recurring cast member in June 2024. Nico Santos was announced as a guest star in September 2024. In August 2025, Ariana Madix joined the cast as a guest star for the second season.

== Broadcast ==
St. Denis Medical premiered on NBC on November 12, 2024. The second season premiered on November 3, 2025. It also streams on Peacock in the United States. The third season premiered on November 2, 2026.

The series was acquired for broadcast in the United Kingdom by the BBC in March 2024. The first season launched on BBC iPlayer, the broadcaster's streaming service, early on June 6, 2025, before a linear premiere on BBC One in a late slot that evening. The second season premiered on May 1, 2026.

In Canada, the series airs on CTV and CTV Comedy Channel, and is available to stream on Crave.

== Reception ==
=== Critical response ===
The review aggregator website Rotten Tomatoes reported an 81% approval rating, based on 27 critic reviews. The website's critics consensus reads, "The prognosis is promising for St. Denis Medical, a tart and well-cast addition to the tried-and-true mockumentary sitcom genre." Metacritic, which uses a weighted average, assigned a score of 66 out of 100 based on 16 critics, indicating "generally favorable" reviews.

=== Ratings ===
The premiere episode's same-day rating was the top-rated scripted show of the night, and the highest-rated scripted launch of a series on broadcast television (without a lead-in from an NFL broadcast) in just under two years. Its total audience increased by 85% in cross-platform viewing in the week post-broadcast, to 7.4 million viewers; the demographic rating also increased, during that time, by 182% to 1.44.

==== Season 1 ====
Viewership and ratings per episode of St. Denis Medical
No.	Title	Air date	Rating/share (18–49)	Viewers (millions)	DVR (18–49)	DVR viewers (millions)	Total (18–49)	Total viewers (millions)	Ref.
1	"Welcome to St. Denis"	November 12, 2024	0.5/6	3.75	0.1	1.01	0.6	4.75	
2	"A Very Robust Personal Life"	November 12, 2024	0.5/5	3.05	0.1	0.87	0.5	3.92	
3	"Weird Stuff You Can't Explain"	November 19, 2024	0.3/4	3.11	0.1	0.77	0.5	3.88	
4	"Salamat You Too"	November 26, 2024	0.3/4	2.66	0.1	0.84	0.4	3.51	
5	"A Peanut and Caramel-Filled Miracle"	December 3, 2024	0.3/4	2.74	0.1	0.57	0.4	3.32	
6	"Ho-Ho-Hollo"	December 17, 2024	0.3/4	2.75	0.1	0.60	0.4	3.35	
7	"50 CC's of Kindness"	January 14, 2025	0.3/3	2.75	0.1	0.64	0.3	3.39	
8	"Gimme the Scuttlebutt"	January 21, 2025	0.3/3	2.47	0.1	0.67	0.3	3.13	
9	"You Got to Have a Plan"	January 28, 2025	0.3/4	2.35	0.1	0.71	0.4	3.07	
10	"People Just Say Stuff Online"	February 4, 2025	0.3/4	2.41	0.1	0.63	0.4	3.03	
11	"Nobody Even Mentions the Brownies!"	February 11, 2025	0.3/4	2.56	0.1	0.58	0.4	3.14	
12	"Buffalo Bruce and Matty the Kid"	February 18, 2025	0.3/4	2.39	0.1	0.63	0.4	3.03	
13	"Some Famous Internet Guy"	February 25, 2025	0.3/4	2.31	0.1	0.55	0.4	2.86	
14	"Listen to Your Ladybugs"	March 11, 2025	0.3/5	2.26	0.1	0.56	0.4	2.82	
15	"Sometimes It's Good to Be Cautious"	March 25, 2025	0.2/4	2.43	0.1	0.56	0.4	2.99	
16	"Anything to Push Zaluva"	April 1, 2025	0.2/3	2.11	0.1	0.58	0.3	2.69	
17	"Bruce-ic and the Mus-ic"	April 22, 2025	0.2/3	2.07	0.1	0.54	0.3	2.61	
18	"This Place Is Our Everything"	April 29, 2025	0.3/4	2.12	0.1	0.54	0.3	2.66	

==== Season 2 ====
Viewership and ratings per episode of St. Denis Medical
No.	Title	Air date	Rating/share (18–49)	Viewers (millions)	DVR (18–49)	DVR viewers (millions)	Total (18–49)	Total viewers (millions)	Ref.
1	"Aloha, Everyone"	November 3, 2025	0.3/4	2.55	0.2	0.64	0.5	3.19	
2	"Mama Bear Activated"	November 3, 2025	0.3/4	2.10	0.2	0.68	0.5	2.78	
3	"Get Me in the Pod, Brother"	November 10, 2025	0.3/4	2.32	0.1	0.59	0.4	2.91	
4	"Two Docs, One Conf"	November 17, 2025	0.3/3	2.28	TBD	TBD	TBD	TBD	
5	"A Strong Cup of Coffee"	November 24, 2025	0.3/4	2.43	TBD	TBD	TBD	TBD	

=== Accolades ===
Year	Award	Category	Recipient(s)	Result	Ref.
2025	Critics' Choice Television Awards	Best Comedy Series	St. Denis Medical	Nominated	
2025	Critics' Choice Television Awards	Best Actor in a Comedy Series	David Alan Grier	Nominated	
2026	Critics' Choice Television Awards	Best Actor in a Comedy Series	David Alan Grier	Nominated	

== See also ==
- Superstore (TV series)
- American Auto (TV series)
- Scrubs (TV series)
- The Office (TV series)
- Parks and Recreation (TV series)
- Abbott Elementary (TV series)
