= Famous (film) =

American psychological thriller film

- Directed by: Jody Hill
- Screenplay by: Chad Hodge
- Based on: Famous by Blake Crouch
- Produced by: Sam Esmail; Chad Hamilton; Michael Sagol; Mark Fasano; Joshua Harris
- Starring: Zac Efron; Phoebe Dynevor; Nicholas Braun; Debby Ryan; Cory Michael Smith; Bill Pullman
- Cinematography: Paul Daley
- Music by: Joseph Stephens
- Production companies: Esmail Corp; Caviar; Gramercy Park Media; CaliWood Pictures; Vacancy Films
- Distributed by: A24
- Country: United States
- Language: English

Famous is an upcoming American psychological thriller film directed by Jody Hill and written by Chad Hodge, based on the 2010 novel by Blake Crouch. It stars Zac Efron, Phoebe Dynevor, Nicholas Braun, Debby Ryan, Cory Michael Smith, and Bill Pullman.

== Synopsis ==
Lance Dunkquist, a 38-year-old loser, uses his uncanny resemblance to movie star James Jansen to pursue his dreams in New York's avant-garde theater scene and Los Angeles.

== Cast ==
- Zac Efron as Lance Dunkquist / James Jansen
- Phoebe Dynevor
- Nicholas Braun
- Debby Ryan
- Cory Michael Smith
- Bill Pullman
- Stephanie Koenig
- Mekki Leeper
- Daniel Zovatto

== Production ==
Announced in February 2024, the film is adapted for the screen by Chad Hodge from the novel by author Blake Crouch. Sam Esmail will produce along with Chad Hamilton through Esmail Corp while Black Bear would handle international sales.

Zac Efron is set to have two roles, playing Hollywood actor James Jansen and his overzealous lookalike fan Lance Dunkquist. In September 2024, Phoebe Dynevor joined the cast of the film. In November 2024, Nicholas Braun, Stephanie Koenig, Debby Ryan, Mekki Leeper and Cory Michael Smith joined the cast, with Daniel Zovatto and Bill Pullman joining in December.

Principal photography began on October 30, 2024 in Atlanta, Georgia, and was expected to last until December 17.

== Release ==
A24 acquired domestic distribution rights to the film in July 2024.
