= Dave Theune =

American comedian and actor

David Theune is an American comedian and actor. His credits include Good Girls, I Am Not Okay With This, The Big Bang Theory, and St. Denis Medical. He performs at UCB Theatre in Los Angeles.

== Career ==
Theune was raised in the small town of Cedar Grove, Wisconsin. He received his bachelor's degree in theatre at University of Wisconsin-Milwaukee. He performed improv at ComedySportz in Milwaukee and iO Theater in Chicago. In 2017 he quit his job to move to Los Angeles to pursue a comedy career. He took classes in improv and sketch at UCB Theatre and eventually joined the house team Bangarang.

Theune has acted in television and film including Florida Girls, Minx, Night Court, Frasier (2023), Santa Clarita Diet, Good Girls, I Am Not Okay With This, The Big Bang Theory, Rim of the World, and Miracle Workers. He portrays supporting character Keith on St. Denis Medical (2024– ).
