= Ronald Gladden =

American actor

- Born: c. 1992 (age 33–34)
- Occupation: Actor
- Years active: 2023–present
- Partner(s): Angelina Celeste (2024–present; engaged)

Ronald Gladden is an American television personality, best known for starring as himself in the American reality hoax sitcom Jury Duty (2023).

== Career ==
In April 2023 Gladden entered the public eye after starring as himself in Jury Duty, an American reality hoax sitcom television series where he was a juror unaware of the hoax. He was cast after responding to a Craigslist advertisement asking for people willing to be part of a jury pool for a civil trial in Southern California that would be covered by a TV documentary crew. He took the opportunity to get paid for a new experience as he continued to search for his next job.

Following the success of Jury Duty, Gladden appeared alongside Ryan Reynolds in a Mint Mobile Ad.

In November 2023, it was announced that Amazon MGM Studios had signed a two-year deal with Gladden to produce, develop, and star in content across platforms.

== Personal life ==
Gladden is a native of Wallowa, Oregon, who moved to San Diego, California to become a solar contractor. Gladden has said he has stayed in contact with the cast and crew of Jury Duty, including James Marsden.

Gladden said, on December 31, 2023, on CNN New Year's Eve Live with Anderson Cooper and Andy Cohen, that he had quit his construction job.

On August 16, 2026, he announced his engagement to his girlfriend, Angelina Celeste.

== Filmography ==
=== Television ===
- Jury Duty (2023)
