= Mekki Leeper =

American writer, actor, and stand-up comedian

- Born: September 9, 1994 (age 32); Chambersburg, Pennsylvania, U.S.
- Occupations: Writer; actor; comedian
- Years active: 2018–present

Mekki Leeper (born September 9, 1994) is a Moroccan-American writer, actor, and stand-up comedian. He is known for his roles on The Sex Lives of College Girls (2021–2022), Jury Duty (2023), and St. Denis Medical (2024–present). For Jury Duty, he received a Primetime Emmy Award nomination for Outstanding Writing for a Comedy Series. His stand-up comedy has been featured on Comedy Central and The Late Late Show with James Corden.

== Life and career ==
Leeper attended Temple University from 2013 until 2017 when he left to pursue his career.

In 2017, Leeper wrote for the White House Correspondents' Dinner. The following year, Vulture included him on their list of "Comedians You Should and Will Know".

In 2019, Leeper received coverage from Time and an ensuing slew of other news media outlets for a fictitious business he created for a Comedy Central special titled 'Control Room'. Posing as 'Oliver Niessen', he claimed to be the CEO of 'Vaev', a parody of an alternative medicine company, which claimed to sell used tissues from someone who was ill for the recipient to breathe in, supposedly inoculating them from illness.

Leeper currently stars on NBC's hit comedy, St. Denis Medical. The show was renewed for a third season in February 2026.

== Filmography ==
=== Film ===
Year	Title	Role	Notes
2023	Fintech	Sean	Short film; also writer, director, and executive producer
2025	Lurker	Moderator	
TBA	Famous	TBA	

=== Television ===
Year	Title	Role	Notes
2018	New Girl	Waiter	Episode: "Tuesday Meeting"
2018	Resolutions	Mekki	Television miniseries; also writer and director
2019	Control Room with Mekki Leeper	Himself	Television special
2019–2020	Crank Yankers	—N/a	16 episodes; writer
2020	Two Joysticks and Couch	Various	Web series; also writer
2021–2022	The Sex Lives of College Girls	Eric Miller	15 episodes
2023	Jury Duty	Noah Price	8 episodes; also writer
2024–present	St. Denis Medical	Matt Pearson	Main role

== Awards and nominations ==
Year	Award	Category	Work	Result	Ref.
2024	Primetime Emmy Awards	Outstanding Writing for a Comedy Series	Jury Duty (for "Ineffective Assistance")	Nominated	
2024	Independent Spirit Awards	Best Ensemble Cast in a New Scripted Series	Jury Duty	Won	
2024	Writers Guild of America Awards	Television: Comedy Series	Jury Duty	Nominated	
2024	Writers Guild of America Awards	Television: New Series	Jury Duty	Nominated	
