= Once Upon a River (film) =

2020 film directed by Haroula Rose

- Directed by: Haroula Rose
- Written by: Haroula Rose
- Based on: Once Upon a River; 2011 novel by Bonnie Jo Campbell
- Produced by: Jacqueline E. Ingram; Haroula Rose
- Starring: Kenadi DelaCerna; John Ashton; Tatanka Means; Lindsay Pulsipher; Sam Straley
- Cinematography: Charlotte Hornsby
- Edited by: Steven Lambiase; Sofi Marshall
- Music by: Zac Rae
- Production companies: Thirty Tigers; Chicago Media Angels; Neon Heart Productions; Glass Bead Films
- Distributed by: Film Movement; Bulldog Film Distribution (United Kingdom)
- Release date: October 2, 2020 (United States)
- Running time: 92 minutes
- Country: United States
- Language: English

Once Upon a River is a 2020 American drama film written, directed and produced by Haroula Rose. It stars Kenadi DelaCerna, John Ashton, Tatanka Means, Lindsay Pulsipher, Sam Straley, and Kenn E. Head. It is based on the best-selling novel by Bonnie Jo Campbell.

The film had its world premiere at the Bentonville Film Festival on May 10, 2019 and went on to play at many other film festivals such as Nashville Film Festival, Sarasota Film Festival, Bend Film Festival, and internationally at Thessaloniki and Evolution Mallorca.

== Premise ==
Once Upon a River is the story of Margo Crane's odyssey on the mythical Stark River in 1970s Michigan. After tragedy befalls her, Margo comes across many friends and foes as she seeks out her estranged mother, only to find her own way of life instead. Often compared to Mark Twain’s Huck Finn, or harkening to Annie Oakley, Once Upon a River is, in the words of Jane Smiley for The New York Times, “an excellent American parable about the consequences of our favorite ideal, freedom.”

== Cast ==
- Kenadi DelaCerna as Margo Crane
- John Ashton as Smoke
- Tatanka Means as Bernard Crane
- Lindsay Pulsipher as Luanne
- Ajuawak Kapashesit as Will
- Sam Straley as Billy Murray
- Dominic Bogart as Brian
- Coburn Goss as Cal Murray
- Josephine Decker as Joanna Murray

== Soundtrack ==
The soundtrack is made of original songs composed for the film by Will Oldham, Rodney Crowell, Peter Bradley Adams, Zac Rae, JD Souther and Haroula Rose.

== Reception ==
On review aggregator Rotten Tomatoes, the film holds an approval rating of 75% based on 32 reviews, with an average rating of 6.50/10. Richard Roeper of the Chicago Sun-Times gave the film three and a half out of four stars, describing the film as "Beautiful. Shocking. Moving. Haunting. Lovely. Lasting. First-time feature writer-director (and Chicago area product) Haroula Rose’s “Once Upon a River” is all that and more. It’s a stark, authentic slice of a certain kind of rough-hewn life — the calloused-hands world we see in gritty films such as “Frozen River” and “Winter’s Bone,” “Leave No Trace” and “American Woman.” There’s no trace of Hollywood glamour or gloss to the story, no hint of actor-y flourishes in the deeply resonant performances. Just a lean, finely crafted, memorably real story announcing the presence of a major new filmmaking talent. “Once Upon a River” is a living prose poem filled with beautifully framed images and featuring some of the strongest writing and acting you’ll find in any movie this year. It’s not to be missed.”

Cath Clarke of The Guardian gave the film three out of five stars, writing, “Mark Twain meets Winter’s Bone in this slice of Americana from first-time feature director Haroula Rose. It opens with a Terrence Malick-ish monologue by 15-year-old Margo (Kenadi DelaCerna): “I missed momma, the way she smelled of cocoa butter and white wine.” A tough, resourceful teenager, Margo lives in a rundown town on the banks of the fictional Stark river in Michigan – the kind of place where skeletons of old cars pile up in front yards. Her mom ran out a year earlier (“The river stink drove her crazy”), leaving Margo and her Native American dad Bernard (Tatanka Means).”

=== Accolades ===
Year	Award	Category	Recipient(s)	Result	Ref.
2018	American Film Festival	US in Progress Award	Haroula Rose	Won	
2019	American Film Festival	Best Film	Haroula Rose	Won	
2019	Bentonville Film Festival	Best Competition Narrative	Haroula Rose	Nominated	
2019	Red Nation Film Festival	Best Film	Haroula Rose	Won	
2019	Red Nation Film Festival	Best Director	Haroula Rose	Won	
2019	Red Nation Film Festival	Outstanding Actor in a Leading Role	Tatanka Means	Won	
2019	Red Nation Film Festival	Outstanding Performance by an Actress in a Leading Role	Kenadi DelaCerna	Nominated	
2019	Tallgrass Film Festival	Stubbornly Independent Award	Haroula Rose	Won	
2019	Vail Film Festival	Narrative Feature	Haroula Rose	Nominated	
2019	Vail Film Festival	Audience Award for Best Film	Haroula Rose	Nominated	
2019	American Indian Film Festival	Best Film	Haroula Rose	Nominated	
2019	American Indian Film Festival	Best Director	Haroula Rose	Nominated	
2019	American Indian Film Festival	Best Supporting Actor	Tatanka Means	Nominated	
2019	American Indian Film Festival	Best Actress	Kenadi DelaCerna	Nominated	
2019	Boston Film Festival	Best Director	Haroula Rose	Won	
2019	Woodstock Film Festival	Best Narrative Feature	Haroula Rose	Nominated	
2019	Thessaloniki Film Festival	WIFT Award	Haroula Rose	Nominated	
2019	Nashville Film Festival	New Directors Competition	Haroula Rose	Nominated	
2020	Sarasota Film Festival	Narrative Feature Film Competition	Haroula Rose	Nominated	
2021	Los Angeles Greek Film Festival	Best Feature Film	Haroula Rose	Nominated	
