= Sherman's Showcase =

American comedy television series

- Genre: Comedy
- Created by: Bashir Salahuddin; Diallo Riddle
- Directed by: Matt Piedmont
- Starring: Bashir Salahuddin; Diallo Riddle
- Country of origin: United States
- Original language: English
- No. of seasons: 2
- No. of episodes: 14 (plus 60-minute special)

Production
- Executive producers: John Legend; Bashir Salahuddin; Diallo Riddle; Mike Jackson; Ty Stiklorious; Frank Scherma; Jim Bouvet; Pete Aronson
- Production location: Glendale, California
- Running time: 22 minutes
- Production companies: The Riddle Entertainment Group; Emerald Street; Get Lifted Film Co.; RadicalMedia

Original release
- Network: IFC
- Release: July 31, 2019 – November 23, 2022

Sherman's Showcase is an American comedy television series created by Bashir Salahuddin and Diallo Riddle. The series premiered on July 31, 2019, on IFC. An hour long "Black History Month Spectacular" aired on June 19, 2020, and that same month a six-episode second season was confirmed, set to air on both IFC and AMC+ in 2022.

== Premise ==
Sherman's Showcase is inspired by variety shows including Soul Train, American Bandstand, The Midnight Special, and In Living Color with each episode hosted by Sherman McDaniel as he takes viewers through time via music and comedy drawn from the forty-year library of a legendary (but fictitious) musical variety show. To do this, the series uses the plot device of presenting a series of paid programs involving the sale of a mostly-complete 23-disc set of 47 seasons of Sherman's Showcase, which are introduced by various celebrity hosts.

== Cast ==
- Bashir Salahuddin as Sherman McDaniels
- Diallo Riddle as Dutch Shepherd

=== Cameos ===
- Common
- Lil Rel Howery
- Tiffany Haddish
- Ray J
- Terrence J
- Damon Wayans Jr.
- Quincy Jones
- Mike Judge
- Ne-Yo
- Marlon Wayans
- Gary Anthony Williams
- Colleen Camp
- Phonte Coleman

== Episodes ==
=== Season 1 (2019) ===
No.	Title	Directed by	Written by	Original release date	US viewers (millions)
1	"Meet Sherman"	Matt Piedmont	Bashir Salahuddin & Diallo Riddle	July 31, 2019	0.105
2	"The Showcase Dancers"	Matt Piedmont	Unknown	July 31, 2019	0.037
3	"Behind the Charade"	Matt Piedmont	Unknown	August 7, 2019	0.149
4	"Enemies"	Matt Piedmont	Unknown	August 14, 2019	0.140
5	"The Ladies of the Showcase"	Matt Piedmont	Unknown	August 21, 2019	N/A
6	"July 8, 1995"	Matt Piedmont	Unknown	August 28, 2019	0.112
7	"White Music"	Matt Piedmont	Unknown	September 4, 2019	N/A
8	"Ray J's Showcase"	Matt Piedmont	Unknown	September 11, 2019	N/A

=== Special ===
No.	Title	Directed by	Written by	Original release date	US viewers (millions)
1	"Black History Month Spectacular"	Matt Piedmont	Bashir Salahuddin, Diallo Riddle, Emily Goldwyn, Rodney Carter, Rob Haze, Will Miles & Zuri Salahuddin	June 19, 2020	0.166
An hour-long look into black icons of past and present, as part of Black History Month (in June).

=== Season 2 (2022) ===
No.	Title	Directed by	Written by	Original release date	US viewers (millions)
1	"Fashion!"	Matt Piedmont	Unknown	October 26, 2022	N/A
Sherman hosts a fashion show but, backstage, it's chaos; Mary J Blige leads a group of singers on an "Ocean's Eleven" mission; how Sherman influenced film director Wes Anderson.
2	"The Sherman's Showcase Awards: Missing at Sea"	Matt Piedmont	Unknown	October 26, 2022	N/A
Recovered black box footage of The 2019 Sherman Showcase Awards, hosted on a boat that went missing.
3	"Sherman From Africa: Live from Lagos"	Matt Piedmont	Unknown	November 2, 2022	N/A
Sherman does a show live from Africa; Sherman becomes a wedding planner, hosts a "Real Housewives" show, makes a movie about soccer and does his own version of Beyonce's "Black is King"; includes part of his failed show Live In Vietnam.
4	"Sherman's 12th Anniversary"	Matt Piedmont	Unknown	November 9, 2022	N/A
Sherman wants a big anniversary special like "MOTOWN 25"; Sherman looks back on his greatest accomplishments, like his cartoon that competed with "Fat Albert", the time he was almost in a James Bond movie and more.
5	"ShermaSnatch"	Unknown	Unknown	November 16, 2022	N/A
6	"Murder at the Shrind"	Unknown	Unknown	November 23, 2022	N/A

== Production ==
=== Development ===
On July 29, 2017, it was announced that IFC had given the production an episodic script order. The series was created by Bashir Salahuddin and Diallo Riddle who were also expected to write and executive produce the potential series.

On May 3, 2018, it was announced that IFC had given the production a series order for a first season consisting of eight episodes. In addition to the previously announced creative team, it was announced that John Legend would serve as an executive producer. Production companies involved with the series include Get Lifted Film Co. and RadicalMedia.

On April 8, 2019, it was announced that the series would premiere on July 31, 2019.

=== Casting ===
Alongside the series order announcement, it was confirmed that Bashir Salahuddin would star as the host of the fictional variety series.

== Reception ==
On review aggregation website Rotten Tomatoes, the series holds an approval rating of 100% with an average rating of 8.58/10, based on 21 reviews. The site's critics consensus reads: "Bold, brisk, and beautiful, Sherman's Showcase is a delightful and stylish sketch show that moves to its own groove and invites everyone to laugh along." Metacritic, which uses a weighted average, assigned the series a score of 76 out of 100 based on 10 critics, indicating "generally favorable reviews".
