= Diallo Riddle =

American writer, producer, actor

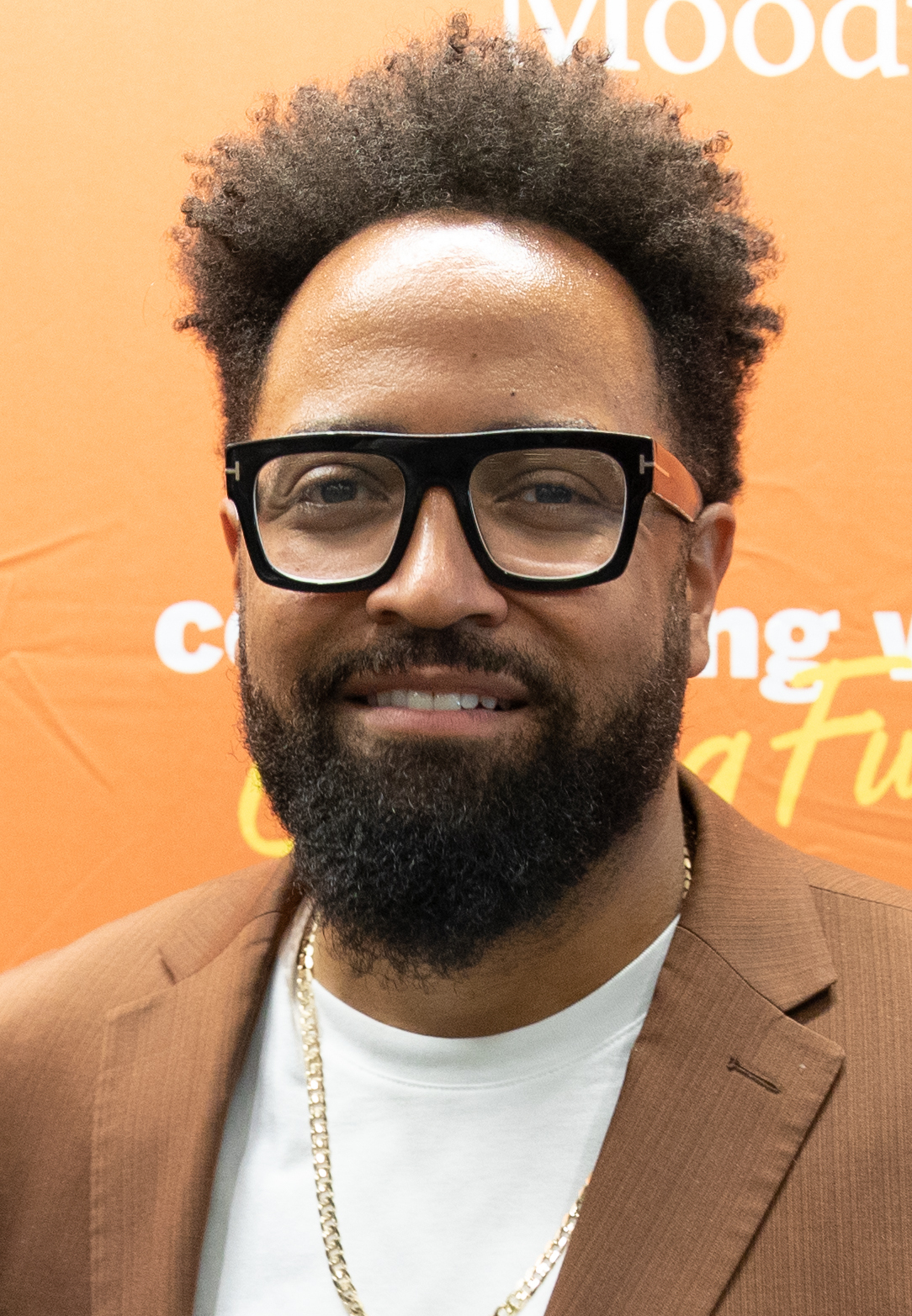
- Born: May 6, 1977 (age 49); Atlanta, Georgia, U.S.
- Education: Harvard University
- Occupations: Television writer, actor, producer, showrunner, and DJ
- Television: Marlon; Late Night With Jimmy Fallon; Silicon Valley
- Partner: Brittany Riddle

Diallo Riddle (born May 6, 1977) is an American writer, producer, actor, showrunner, and DJ. Riddle is best known for his co-starring role as Stevie in the NBC sitcom Marlon, and has been the co-creator of several different television series. He won an NAACP Image Award for his directing on South Side.

== Early life ==
Riddle, who is of African American heritage, was born in Atlanta, Georgia, as the sixth child of American painter and sculptor John Riddle Jr and Carmen Riddle. He attended Benjamin Elijah Mays High School, and later graduated from Harvard University, majoring in history.

== Career ==
After attending Harvard University, Riddle and his writing partner Bashir Salahuddin, started a sketch comedy group called Cleo's Apartment. The group's members included Robin Thede, Thomas Fraser, Wyatt Cenac, Nika King and Nefetari Spencer. The group's stage show was adapted into a web series The Message by AOL and HBO, which aired in 2007.

Riddle, alongside his creative partner Bashir Salahuddin, have launched multiple projects over the years through their production company, J30 Studios. Both have multi-year deals with Warner Bros TV to create and produce TV projects. In August 2022 it was announced the duo will serve as showrunners, executive producers, and writers on “Book of Marlon,” Marlon Wayans’ new comedy inspired by his life and career.

In 2008, he joined the writing staff of Comedy Central's Chocolate News. In 2009, he joined the writing staff of the popular television show Late Night with Jimmy Fallon, where he was also a performer. Among his sketches on the show, Riddle co-wrote Slow Jam The News with Barack Obama and three editions of A History of Rap with Jimmy Fallon and Justin Timberlake.

In 2013, Riddle filmed an HBO pilot for a show called The Reporters. Riddle then received a recurring role for the HBO show Silicon Valley. In 2015, HBO ordered a series written by and starring Riddle named Brothers in Atlanta. However, the order was canceled in early 2016.

In 2017, Riddle became a regular on the NBC's sitcom Marlon, where he played the role of Stevie, the best friend of Marlon Wayans.

The same year, Comedy Central picked up his new comedy show entitled South Side. In 2017, Riddle was also cast in a recurring role on the drama series Rise. Riddle has gone to write for an array of TV series, including The Last O.G., starring Tracy Morgan. Of the projects Riddle has worked on, he has also helped curate the music for the movie Baby Driver, and served as a writer for the television specials Taraji and Terrence’s White Hot Holidays, Maya and Marty, and The Maya Rudolph Show.

On May 3, 2018, it was announced that IFC picked up to series Sherman's Showcase, a scripted musical variety sketch comedy show which Riddle wrote with his writing partner Bashir Salahuddin. The series is produced by John Legend's Get Lifted Film Co. and premiered on July 31, 2019, on IFC.

On September 4, 2019, Comedy Central and WBEZ Chicago launched South Side Stories, a groundbreaking podcast collaboration between a public media organization and a cable television partner that celebrates the real-life people and places that inspired the hit scripted comedy series. The 10 episode podcast series was hosted by both Riddle and Salahuddin.

In 2020, South Side was renewed for another season by Comedy Central, to begin streaming on HBO Max in 2021. The release date for the second season of South Side was 11 November 2021. The third season of South Side was also launched and debuted on August 12, 2022. In June 2020, a second season of the Emmy winning show, Sherman's Showcase was confirmed, set to air on AMC in 2021. The second season of Sherman's Showcase debuted on October 26, 2022.

More recently, the duo of Riddle and Salahuddin signed a deal with Warner Bros. Television Studios.

Since 2023, Riddle has co-hosted the music history podcast One Song.

== Awards and nominations ==
In 2011, Riddle was nominated for the Primetime Emmy Award for Outstanding Writing for a Variety, Music or Comedy Series through his work on Late Night. He was also nominated for a Writers Guild Award. In 2016 he received an additional nomination from the Writers Guild in the category of Comedy/Variety - Sketch Series for his work on Maya & Marty.

In 2019, "Time Loop" from Sherman's Showcase, won the Hollywood Music in Media Award for Best Original Song in a TV Show/Limited Series and in 2021, Riddle was nominated by the NAACP Image Awards for Outstanding Writing in a Television Movie or Special for Sherman’s Showcase Black History Month Spectacular.

In 2022, Riddle was nominated for the NAACP Image Award for Outstanding Directing in a Comedy Series for the “Tornado” episode of South Side.

== Filmography ==
| Year | Title | Credited as | | | Role |
| Year | Title | Producer | Writer | Actor | Role |
|---|---|---|---|---|---|
| 2009-2011 | Late Night with Jimmy Fallon | No | Yes | Yes | Mr. Farouk |
| 2014 | The Maya Rudolph Show | No | Yes | No | |
| 2015 | Taraji and Terrence's White Hot Holidays | No | Yes | No | |
| 2016 | Maya & Marty | No | Yes | No | |
| 2016 | Brothers in Atlanta | Yes | Yes | Yes | Langston |
| 2017 | NBA Awards 2017 | No | Yes | No | |
| 2017-2018 | Marlon | No | No | Yes | Stevie |
| 2018 | The Last O.G. | Yes | Yes | No | |
| 2018 | Rise | No | No | Yes | Andy Kranepool |
| 2015-2019 | Silicon Valley | No | No | Yes | Paul |
| 2019 | Black-ish | No | No | Yes | Reggie |
| 2019–present | South Side | Yes | Yes | Yes | Allen Gayle |
| 2019–present | Sherman's Showcase | Yes | Yes | Yes | Dutch Shepherd |
| 2020 | Curb Your Enthusiasm | No | No | Yes | Fireman |
| 2020 | Indebted | No | No | Yes | Juan Pablo |
| 2021 | Insecure | No | No | Yes | Moderator |
| 2023 | Aqua Teen Hunger Force | No | No | Yes | Terry the Train, voice role |
| 2026 | Life, Larry and the Pursuit of Unhappiness | No | No | Yes | John Appleton |
