= Bashir Salahuddin =

American actor, writer, and comedian (born 1976)

- Born: June 30, 1976 (age 50); Chicago, Illinois, U.S.
- Education: Harvard University (BS)
- Occupations: Actor; writer; comedian
- Years active: 2002–present
- Spouse: Chandra Russell (m. 2017)
- Children: 1
- Relatives: Sultan Salahuddin (brother)

Bashir Salahuddin (born June 30, 1976) is an American actor, writer, and comedian.

== Early life ==
Salahuddin, who is of Panamanian and African American heritage, was born and raised in the South Side of Chicago, Illinois. His father is originally from Panama and moved to Chicago with his family when he was a child. His mother grew up on the city's West Side. They met when they both were students at Southern Illinois University and converted to Islam in the early 1970s. His parents divorced in the early 2000s. Salahuddin grew up with three brothers and two sisters and has two younger half-siblings from his father's second marriage. Salahuddin's father worked as an airplane mechanic for Midway Airlines at Chicago Midway International Airport. As family members of an airline employee, the family was able to fly on many stand-by trips across the U.S. He credits his father with instilling in him what he refers to as the "immigrant work ethic".

Salahuddin was a pre-medical student at Harvard University, graduating in 1998. He performed in several theater productions, including at the Hasty Pudding. He also met and became friends with Diallo Riddle, who would become his writing partner. In his junior year at Harvard, Salahuddin decided he wanted to be an actor and attended the Hangar Theater's training program.

== Career ==
After graduating from Harvard, Salahuddin returned to Chicago and worked as a paralegal in order to save money to be able to move to Los Angeles. When he got to Los Angeles in the early 2000s, he worked as a PA at Warner Brothers and as a waiter. Not getting the work they wanted, Salahuddin and Riddle began making their own web videos. David Alan Grier saw their videos and hired them as a writing team on his show Chocolate News in 2008. Jimmy Fallon then asked them to join the writing staff of Late Night with Jimmy Fallon and they moved to New York City. They stayed on the show for four years.

In January 2016, it was confirmed that the half-hour comedy series Brothers in Atlanta, (based on a 2013 pilot) that HBO had commissioned from Salahuddin and Riddle, had been cancelled. In March 2016, Salahuddin was cast as the male lead in a Hulu pilot comedy, Crushed, co-starring with Regina Hall. In June 2016, the production company Lionsgate announced they were moving production of the pilot from North Carolina to Canada due to North Carolina's governor signing a controversial anti-LGBT law as well as tax incentives available to the production in Vancouver.

As an actor, Salahuddin has appeared on Superstore, Snatched, Arrested Development, Single Parents, Looking and The Mindy Project. He was cast as a recurring character on the Netflix show GLOW, which premiered in 2017.

Together with Riddle, Salahuddin created the comedy show South Side, which premiered on Comedy Central on 24 July 2019. The show centers around two recent community college graduates trying to become entrepreneurs in Chicago's South Side, portrayed by Salahuddin's brother Sultan and Kareme Young. Salahuddin, his wife Chandra Russell and Riddle also star.

Salahuddin and Riddle also created the comedy show Sherman's Showcase, which premiered on IFC on 31 July 2019. The show is part parody of, part homage to shows like Soul Train, American Bandstand and The Midnight Special. Guest stars include John Legend, Questlove, Quincy Jones, Natasha Bedingfield, Tiffany Haddish and Eliza Coupe.

In 2018, it was announced that Salahuddin was cast in Tom Cruise's 2022 action drama Top Gun: Maverick. In 2019, Salahuddin was cast in a leading role in The 24th, a film about the all-black Twenty-Fourth United States Infantry Regiment and the Houston Riot of 1917. The film is co-written and directed by Kevin Willmott. More recently, Salahuddin and Riddle signed a deal with Warner Bros. Television.

== Personal life ==
Salahuddin married actress Chandra Russell in 2017. They have a son.

== Filmography ==
=== Film ===
| Year | Title | Role | Notes |
|---|---|---|---|
| 2006 | Jam | Cop #1 | |
| 2006 | Nailed | Willis | |
| 2017 | Snatched | Morgan Russell | |
| 2018 | Gringo | Stu | |
| 2018 | A Simple Favor | Detective Summervile | |
| 2019 | Marriage Story | Director | |
| 2020 | The 24th | Big Joe | |
| 2021 | Cyrano | Le Bret | |
| 2022 | Top Gun: Maverick | Hondo Coleman | |
| 2023 | Family Switch | Molson | |
| 2024 | Miller's Girl | Boris Fillmore | |
| 2025 | Back in Action | Coach Chris | |
| 2025 | Another Simple Favor | Detective Summervile | |
| 2025 | Diary of a Wimpy Kid: The Last Straw | Mr. Warren | Voice role |

=== Television ===
| Year | Title | Role | Notes |
|---|---|---|---|
| 2003 | Threat Matrix | Tower Supervisor | Episode: "In Plane Sight" |
| 2003 | Miss Match | Group Leader | Episode: "Addicted to Love" |
| 2004 | Oliver Beene | Bouncer | Episode: "Idol Chatter" |
| 2004, 2019 | Arrested Development | David 'G-Man' Barnes / Prisoner | 3 episodes |
| 2005 | Kitchen Confidential | Health-Conscious Patron #3 | Episode: "Dinner Date with Death" |
| 2005 | Grey's Anatomy | Bailey's Husband | Episode: "Bring the Pain" |
| 2006 | Help Me Help You | Cop | Episode: "Perseverance" |
| 2007 | Finish Our Movie | Robert / Dave | 4 episodes |
| 2007 | Bones | Counselor | Episode: "Death in the Saddle" |
| 2008 | Terminator: The Sarah Connor Chronicles | School Security Guard | Episode: "The Turk" |
| 2009–2012 | Late Night with Jimmy Fallon | Various roles | 76 episodes; also writer |
| 2013 | The Mindy Project | Doug | Episode: "The One That Got Away" |
| 2014 | The Tonight Show Starring Jimmy Fallon | Latimore | Episode: "Cameron Diaz/Jim Gaffigan/Future Featuring Pusha T" |
| 2015 | Looking | Malik | 6 episodes |
| 2016 | Looking: The Movie | Malik | Television film |
| 2016 | Crushed | Will | Television film |
| 2016 | Brothers in Atlanta | Moose | Television film |
| 2017 | Curb Your Enthusiasm | Ambulance Driver | Episode: "Fatwa!" |
| 2017 | The Fake News with Ted Nelms | Glen Burke | Episode #1.1 |
| 2017–2019 | GLOW | Keith Bang | 17 episodes |
| 2018, 2019 | Superstore | Pastor Craig | 2 episodes |
| 2019–2022 | South Side | Officer Goodnight | 28 episodes; also writer, creator, and executive producer |
| 2019 | Black-ish | Harold | Episode: "Mad and Boujee" |
| 2019–2020 | Single Parents | Ron | 3 episodes |
| 2019–present | Sherman's Showcase | Sherman McDaniels | 15 episodes; also writer, creator, and executive producer |
| 2020–2023 | American Dad! | Officer / Pawn Shop Owner (voice) | 4 episodes |
| 2022 | Robot Chicken | Vince LaSalle / Wildebeest Husband / Dorothy Zbornak (voice) | Episode: "May Cause an Excess of Ham" |
| 2022 | The Dropout | Brendan Morris | 3 episodes |
| 2023 | Aqua Teen Hunger Force | Pyramid (voice) | 1 episode |
| 2026 | Widow's Bay | Arthur Lloyd | 1 episode |

== Awards and nominations ==
| Year | Award | Category | Nominated work | Result |
|---|---|---|---|---|
| 2011 | 63rd Primetime Emmy Awards | Outstanding Writing for a Variety, Music, or Comedy Series (shared with the others) | Late Night with Jimmy Fallon | Nominated |
| 2012 | 64th Writers Guild of America Awards | Comedy/Variety (Including Talk) – Series (shared with the others) | Late Night with Jimmy Fallon | Nominated |
| 2017 | 69th Writers Guild of America Awards | Comedy/Variety – Sketch Series (shared with the others) | Maya & Marty | Nominated |
| 2018 | 24th Screen Actors Guild Awards | Outstanding Performance by an Ensemble in a Comedy Series (shared with the others) | GLOW | Nominated |
