= Haroula Rose =

Greek-American filmmaker

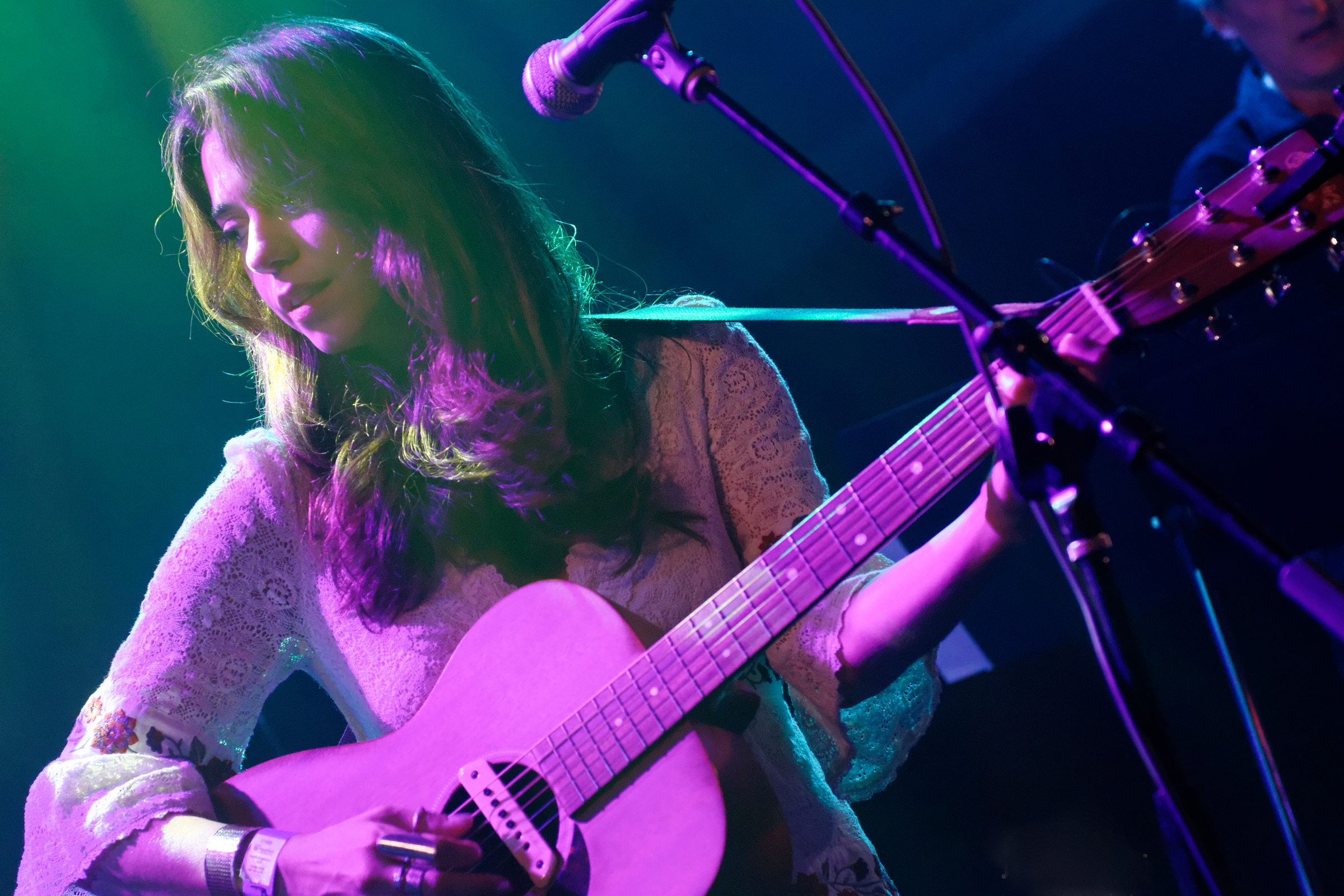
- Rose in 2013
- Born: Haroula Rose Spyropoulos; Chicago, Illinois, United States
- Occupations: Director, Writer, Producer, Musician, Actress
- Years active: 2005–present
- Spouse: Oliver Hill

Haroula Rose is a Greek-American filmmaker, musician and performer. She is best known for her directorial debut Once Upon A River, an adaptation of the best-selling novel by Bonnie Jo Campbell. She is also known for her albums, EPs, singles and remixes.

== Early life ==
Rose was born in Chicago to Greek immigrant parents. She holds a BA and MA degrees from the University of Chicago, and attended the University of Southern California's School of Cinematic Arts for her MFA. After college she was awarded a Fulbright Fellowship to Madrid, where she was an educator and began working on her own writing and films. Upon returning she met Ryan Coogler on her first day of classes, and was an associate producer on Coogler’s first film, Fruitvale Station.

== Career ==
Rose's debut feature film, Once Upon a River, premiered at the Bentonville Film Festival, presented at many film festivals across the world and won the Efebo d'Oro. Her pilot, Lost & Found, premiered at the 2017 Tribeca Film Festival. It also won the Audience Award at the Bentonville Film Festival. Her second feature film, All Happy Families, stars Josh Radnor and Rob Huebel, and premiered at the Chicago International Film Festival on October 12, 2023.

== Personal life ==
Haroula has been married to singer-songwriter and composer Oliver Hill since 2023.

== Filmography ==
Year	Film	Director	Writer	Producer	Note
2009	A Portrait of the Artist	Yes	No	No	Short Film
2013	No Love Song	No	Yes	No	Short Film
2013	Heaven Adores You	No	No	Yes	Documentary
2013	Baby Crazy	Yes	Yes	No	Short Film
2014	Fruitvale Station	No	No	Yes	Feature Film
2015	The Fear of 13	No	No	Yes	Documentary
2015	Be the Movement	Yes	No	No	Documentary
2015	Wedding Dress	Yes	Yes	No	Short Film
2017	Permanent	No	No	Yes	Feature Film
2017	Lost & Found	Yes	Yes	No	TV series
2019	As They Slept	Yes	No	Yes	Short Film
2020	Once Upon a River	Yes	Yes	Yes	Feature Film
2024	All Happy Families	Yes	Yes	Yes	Feature Film

== Discography ==
- 2009 - EP Someday
- 2011 - These Open Roads
- 2013 - EP So Easy
- 2016 - Here the Blue River (Thirty Tigers)
- 2020 - Grass Stains Acoustic EP
- 2022 - Catch the Light
