= Rachel Kaly =

American comedian and actress

- Born: New York, New York, U.S.
- Education: Wesleyan University Hunter College High School
- Occupations: Comedian, actress

Rachel Kaly is an American comedian and actress. Vulture selected her for their 2023 list of Comedians You Should Know.

== Life and career ==
Kaly was born and raised in New York City. She is of Jewish and Middle Eastern descent. Kaly started doing stand up at around nine years old with Gotham Comedy Club's children's comedy troupe. She attended Hunter College High School. She also attended Wesleyan University where she participated in comedy and improv.

The New York Times writer Jason Zinoman referred to her as a "sly, deadpan artist" who "leans into vulnerability." She performed a regular monthly show at Union Hall for which she challenged herself to write new material at each set.

She has openly discussed her mental health struggles in her comedy. Kaly debuted at Edinburgh Fringe Festival 2024 with her show Hospital Hour that focused on her 300 hospitalizations for mental health crises. Kaly co-hosted the podcast Too Far with Robby Hoffman.

In 2026 the pilot Worried, co-starring Kaly and Gideon Adlon, premiered at Sundance Film Festival. In March 2026, Kaly was also a main cast member on season two of Jury Duty.

She is gay.

== Accolades ==
- 2023 Comedians You Should Know, Vulture
