= Brooklyn Nine-Nine season 6 =

Brooklyn Nine-Nine
- Season 6
- DVD cover
- Starring: Andy Samberg; Stephanie Beatriz; Terry Crews; Melissa Fumero; Joe Lo Truglio; Chelsea Peretti; Andre Braugher; Dirk Blocker; Joel McKinnon Miller
- No. of episodes: 18

Release
- Original network: NBC
- Original release: January 10 – May 16, 2019

Season chronology
- ← Previous; Season 5 Next → Season 7

The sixth season of the television sitcom Brooklyn Nine-Nine premiered on January 10, 2019 on NBC and concluded on May 16, 2019. This is the first season to air on NBC (whose partner studio Universal Television produces the show), as the series was canceled on May 10, 2018 by Fox. NBC picked it up for a sixth season shortly after the series had been canceled on May 11, 2018. The season consists of 18 episodes.

== Summary ==
Holt finds out he lost the commissioner position to John Kelly and is sent into a deep depression until Jake and Amy encourage him to stand up to Kelly's regressive policies, resulting in the new commissioner retaliating against the Nine-Nine. Gina quits her job after deciding that her talents would be better spent elsewhere and becomes a successful internet celebrity. Amy and Jake debate on whether they want kids or not. Terry passes the Lieutenant's Exam, and wins the "Cinco de Mayo" Heist aka Halloween Heist for the first time. However the Nine-Nine doesn't have enough funds for him to stay and he finds out that he might be transferred to Staten Island.

Jake and Holt discover that Kelly is using his new anonymous tip app to illegally wiretap the population, forcing them to recruit some of their old rivals to help expose his crimes. Thanks to Jake and Wuntch staging an arrest for a fake kidnapping, Kelly is suspended and Wuntch becomes the acting commissioner. She uses her new position to allow Terry to stay at the Nine-Nine and force Holt to make up for his missing patrol officer days.

== Cast ==
=== Main ===
- Andy Samberg as Detective Jake Peralta
- Stephanie Beatriz as Detective Rosa Diaz
- Terry Crews as Sergeant Terry Jeffords
- Melissa Fumero as Sergeant Amy Santiago
- Joe Lo Truglio as Detective Charles Boyle
- Chelsea Peretti as Gina Linetti (Note: Only credited for the episodes she appears in and is also credited as a special guest star in "Return of the King".)
- Andre Braugher as Captain Raymond Holt
- Dirk Blocker as Detective Michael Hitchcock (Note: Promoted to Main in "A Tale of Two Bandits".)
- Joel McKinnon Miller as Detective Norm Scully/Earl Scully

=== Recurring ===
- Phil Reeves as John Kelly
- Marc Evan Jackson as Kevin Cozner
- Kevin Dorff as Hank
- Olga Merediz as Julia Diaz
- Bertila Damas as Camila Santiago
- Reggie Lee as Ronald Yee
- Antonio Raul Corbo as Nikolaj Boyle
- Drew Tarver as Gary Jennings
- Winston Story as Bill Hummertrout
- Tim Meadows as Caleb John Gosche
- Ken Marino as Jason "C.J." Stentley
- Dean Winters as Keith "The Vulture" Pembroke
- Kyra Sedgwick as Madeline Wuntch
- Cameron Esposito as Jocelyn Pryce

=== Guest ===
- Alan Ritchson as young Scully
- Wyatt Nash as young Hitchcock
- Donna D'Errico as Marissa Costa
- Daniel Di Tomasso as young Gio Costa
- Paul Rust as Mikey Joseph
- Yassir Lester as Quentin Chase
- Mario Lopez as himself
- Eugene Lee Yang as Theo Lorql
- Craig Robinson as Doug Judy
- Nicole Byer as Trudy Judy
- Rob Riggle as Rob Dulubnik
- Michael Mosley as Franco McCoy
- Karan Soni as Gordon Lundt
- Briga Heelan as Keri Brennan
- Jonathan Chase as Seth Haggerty
- Gabe Liedman as Oliver Cox
- Matt Lowe as Beefer
- Lin-Manuel Miranda as David Santiago
- Ike Barinholtz as Gintars Irbe
- David Paymer as William Tate
- Julia Sweeney as Pam
- Oliver Muirhead as Wesley Allister
- Bob Stephenson as Randy
- Sean Astin as Sergeant Knox

== Episodes ==
Season 6 episodes
No. overall	No. in season	Title	Directed by	Written by	Original release date	Prod. code	U.S. viewers (millions)
113	1	"Honeymoon"	Giovani Lampassi	Neil Campbell	January 10, 2019	601	3.54
Jake and Amy use their wedding insurance to spend their honeymoon on a beach resort in Mexico. They end up staying at the same hotel as Holt, who is taking some time off to recover from losing the Commissioner title to John Kelly. When his depression starts ruining their vacation and leads him to consider quitting his job, the newlyweds try to figure out how to lift his spirits. Meanwhile, Terry struggles to lead the precinct during Holt's absence, and Charles tries to find out from Gina why their parents are divorcing.
114	2	"Hitchcock & Scully"	Cortney Carrillo	Lang Fisher	January 17, 2019	602	2.83
Jake and Charles investigate a case from Hitchcock and Scully's younger days to determine if the two older detectives are withholding any stolen cash. Due to Holt's campaign against John Kelly, the Commissioner closes off the lower level and forces most of the departments to work in a tight space, leading to Amy and her officers coming into conflict with Terry and Rosa. Gina helps Holt prepare for a televised interview.
115	3	"The Tattler"	Jennifer Arnold	David Phillips	January 24, 2019	603	2.75
At Jake and Gina's 20-year high-school reunion, Jake and Amy try to find out who framed Jake as "The Tattler" and ruined his senior year while Gina tries marketing herself in front of a potential investor. Holt, Terry, Hitchcock and Scully try winning a radio contest. Charles helps Rosa choose between two potential love interests.
116	4	"Four Movements"	Luke Del Tredici	Phil Augusta Jackson	January 31, 2019	604	2.72
Gina announces to the precinct that she is quitting and plans to have a special "Gina moment" with each of her coworkers in the following two weeks. Holt plays her in a game of chess and questions her future. Rosa and an emotional Amy take her out to brunch. Jake organizes a going away party for her and attempts to invite Mario Lopez.
117	5	"A Tale of Two Bandits"	Cortney Carrillo	Luke Del Tredici	February 7, 2019	605	3.04
Doug Judy fakes his death and works with Jake and Terry to find out who has been replicating his crimes as the Pontiac Bandit, only to discover it is his sister, Trudy Judy. When the firefighters attempt to make Shaw's their new local hangout, the rest of the precinct challenges them to a drinking contest to keep their favorite spot.
118	6	"The Crime Scene"	Michael McDonald	Justin Noble	February 14, 2019	606	2.56
Jake and Rosa are assigned to a complicated murder case that appears to have little to no leads. The investigation becomes even more difficult when Jake promises the victim's mother that they will find the killer.
119	7	"The Honeypot"	Phil Augusta Jackson	Carol Kolb	February 21, 2019	607	2.35
While trying to find a new assistant, Jake and Holt discover that Commissioner Kelly has sent a spy to pose as an applicant. Jake believes they can use the spy against Kelly, while Holt thinks it's best to just get rid of him. Amy tries to clean up the crowded precinct by convincing the others to get rid of their valuable items.
120	8	"He Said, She Said"	Stephanie Beatriz	Lang Fisher	February 28, 2019	609	2.36
Amy and Jake investigate a case where a businesswoman who broke her boss's penis claims he was sexually assaulting her. Amy's past traumatic experience with the subject makes her determined to bring the assailant to justice, even though it means potentially jeopardizing the woman's future. Meanwhile, Terry and Charles think Holt's trying to relive his glory days when he believes his arch nemesis, the Disco Strangler, faked his death during a prison transport and is on the loose.
121	9	"The Golden Child"	Claire Scanlon	Neil Campbell	March 7, 2019	610	1.99
Amy and Jake assist Amy's brother, David, in exposing Brazilian criminals who tried to frame him for drug abuse. Jake tries to prevent Amy's jealousy over David's accomplishments and being their parents' favorite child from overwhelming her. Charles puts Holt's and Terry's acting abilities to the test by having them go undercover in the holding room with a criminal he's trying to get information from.
122	10	"Gintars"	Linda Mendoza	Andy Gosche	March 14, 2019	611	2.05
Nikolaj's birth father, Gintars, arrives in New York to visit his son. When Charles is afraid of being upstaged by him, Jake tries to find a way to get Gintars out of the city. Rosa is annoyed when Amy and Holt invite the famed forensic scientist Dr. Yee to use his experimental flies to inspect a murder case she's been working on. Terry starts panicking when he hears how mites can attach themselves to human hair.
123	11	"The Therapist"	Rebecca Addelman	Jeff Topolski	March 21, 2019	608	2.13
Jake helps Charles investigate a murder case involving a psychiatrist's patient, forcing him to confront his own issues on therapy. Rosa is hesitant to have Holt meet her girlfriend, fearing he'd be too judgmental. Terry is sensitive when Amy accuses him of ordering a book on how to improve his sex life.
124	12	"Casecation"	Beth McCarthy-Miller	Luke Del Tredici	April 11, 2019	612	1.88
With their work lives so busy lately, Jake invites Amy to help him stand guard over a comatose mobster at a hospital while celebrating their anniversary. However, their "casecation" turns tense when they start arguing over whether they want a baby or not.
125	13	"The Bimbo"	Joe Lo Truglio	Paul Welsh & Madeline Walter	April 18, 2019	613	1.78
Jake and Holt investigate a robbery at Kevin's University in hopes of displaying Holt's intellect to Kevin's colleagues. Amy and Terry compete over who can raise their squad's morale over lunchtime activities.
126	14	"Ticking Clocks"	Payman Benz	Carol Kolb	April 25, 2019	615	1.69
On an episode that takes place in real time, Jake and the squad must track down a hacker who has infiltrated the Nine-Nine's servers. As this is going on, Rosa deals with relationship issues, Terry struggles to handle a group of sorority girls, Amy rushes to the precinct from the dentist, and Hitchcock and Scully attempt to cook the perfect lasagna.
127	15	"Return of the King"	Melissa Fumero	Phil Augusta Jackson	May 2, 2019	614	1.65
Since leaving the Nine-Nine, Gina has become a successful internet celebrity. She requests Jake and Terry's help in protecting her against a possible assassin at a live fan meetup, though the two aren't thrilled with how she's blown them off for months. Holt thinks Nikolaj may be a potential child genius and tries to get Charles to change his parenting strategy. Rosa gets stuck in a closet thanks to her bandaged hands and refuses to ask for Amy's help.
128	16	"Cinco de Mayo"	Rebecca Asher	David Phillips	May 9, 2019	616	1.83
To ease some of the stress off of Terry's upcoming Lieutenant's Exam, the group decides to host their annual Halloween Heist (which they were forced to cancel last year) on Cinco de Mayo. Jake teams up with Terry, Holt teams up with Amy, and Charles teams up with Rosa, but everyone is willing to stab each other in the back when they get the chance. Terry proves who the "Ultimate Human/Genius" is and reveals he already passed the Lieutenant's Exam weeks ago.
129	17	"Sicko"	Matthew Nodella	Justin Noble	May 16, 2019	617	1.63
Holt assigns a serial killer case to Jake and Charles and tries to have them avoid using Commissioner John Kelly's new app that allows residents to send in anonymous tips. Terry finds out that he's being transferred to Staten Island since the precinct doesn't have enough money to keep him on as a Lieutenant, so he tries to convince a coworker to quit his job and become a Broadway star. While Kelly's app does help Jake, Charles, and Holt find the killer, they discover that the anonymous tip was sent by one of his subordinates and that he is wiretapping the population. Due to his higher ranking and evidence of Holt texting Jake about bringing Kelly down, they are unable to report his illegal activity.
130	18	"Suicide Squad"	Dan Goor	Dan Goor & Luke Del Tredici	May 16, 2019	618	1.55
To expose Kelly's crimes, Jake recruits the Vulture, C.J., and Madeline Wuntch to stage a kidnapping and bug Kelly. The plan falls apart due to the Vulture and C.J.'s ineptitude and Holt's distrust of Wuntch. Wuntch seemingly betrays the team to Kelly and has them all arrested, but it's later revealed to be a ruse by Jake so she could get access to Kelly's phone. Kelly is suspended and Wuntch becomes acting commissioner until they can find a replacement. As this is going on, Terry is in denial over getting transferred to Staten Island, until Wuntch uses her temporary position to alter the budget and allow Terry to stay at the Nine-Nine. However, because Holt inadvertently revealed to Wuntch that he only spent a month as a uniformed patrolman before becoming a detective, which is in breach of NYPD rules, she forces him back into uniform to make up for his missing time.

== Production ==
=== Cancellation and renewal ===
On May 10, 2018, it was announced that Fox had canceled Brooklyn Nine-Nine. Following the announcement, other networks including Netflix, Hulu, and TBS expressed interest in picking up the series for a sixth season. However, it was subsequently reported that all three networks had declined to pick up the series. A hashtag supporting the renewal of the series also became the number-one trend on Twitter.

On May 11, 2018, the day after the announcement of its cancellation, NBC officially picked up the series for a thirteen-episode sixth season. An NBC executive stated about the series, "Ever since we sold this show to Fox I've regretted letting it get away, and it's high time it came back to its rightful home." On September 7, 2018, NBC ordered five additional episodes for the season, increasing the episode total to eighteen.

=== Casting ===
All current main cast members returned for the sixth season. On October 3, 2018 Chelsea Peretti announced that she would depart the series during the sixth season. Her final scene was filmed in the first full week of November 2018. Peretti's final episode as a main cast member was the fourth episode, entitled "Four Movements"; she returned to the series as a guest star in the fifteenth episode, "Return of the King."

=== Directing ===
Season 6 marks the first season that features episodes directed by a main cast member. Stephanie Beatriz directed the episode "He Said, She Said", which was inspired by the Me Too movement and focuses on the investigation of a sexual assault. Joe Lo Truglio directed the thirteenth episode, titled "The Bimbo" and Melissa Fumero directed "Return of the King", which focuses on the return of Chelsea Peretti's character, Gina Linetti.

== Broadcast ==
The season premiered as a mid-season replacement in the middle of the 2018–19 television season. It aired on Thursdays at 9:00 pm from January 10, 2019.

== Reception ==
=== Ratings ===
Viewership and ratings per episode of Brooklyn Nine-Nine season 6
No.	Title	Air date	Rating/share (18–49)	Viewers (millions)	DVR (18–49)	DVR viewers (millions)	Total (18–49)	Total viewers (millions)
1	"Honeymoon"	January 10, 2019	1.2/5	3.54	0.6	1.28	1.8	4.82
2	"Hitchcock & Scully"	January 17, 2019	0.9/4	2.83	—N/a	—N/a	—N/a	—N/a
3	"The Tattler"	January 24, 2019	0.9/4	2.75	0.4	—N/a	1.3	—N/a
4	"Four Movements"	January 31, 2019	0.8/4	2.72	0.5	0.96	1.3	3.68
5	"A Tale of Two Bandits"	February 7, 2019	0.9/4	3.04	0.4	0.91	1.3	3.93
6	"The Crime Scene"	February 14, 2019	0.8/4	2.56	0.4	0.91	1.2	3.47
7	"The Honeypot"	February 21, 2019	0.8/4	2.35	0.3	0.82	1.1	3.17
8	"He Said, She Said"	February 28, 2019	0.7/3	2.36	0.4	0.88	1.1	3.24
9	"The Golden Child"	March 7, 2019	0.6/3	1.99	0.5	1.00	1.1	2.99
10	"Gintars"	March 14, 2019	0.6/3	2.05	0.4	0.91	1.0	2.96
11	"The Therapist"	March 21, 2019	0.5/3	2.13	0.5	0.87	1.0	3.00
12	"Casecation"	April 11, 2019	0.6/3	1.88	0.3	0.81	0.9	2.69
13	"The Bimbo"	April 18, 2019	0.5/3	1.78	0.5	0.92	1.0	2.70
14	"Ticking Clocks"	April 25, 2019	0.5/2	1.69	0.4	0.88	0.9	2.58
15	"Return of the King"	May 2, 2019	0.5/3	1.65	0.5	0.87	1.0	2.53
16	"Cinco de Mayo"	May 9, 2019	0.6/3	1.83	0.4	0.84	1.0	2.68
17	"Sicko"	May 16, 2019	0.5/3	1.63	0.5	0.92	1.0	2.55
18	"Suicide Squad"	May 16, 2019	0.5/2	1.55	0.5	0.91	1.0	2.46

=== Critical response ===
The sixth season received mostly positive reviews, who praised the many guest stars and the John Kelly storyline, although the pacing received a mixed response. The review aggregator website Rotten Tomatoes reports a 100% approval rating, with an average score of 8.32/10, based on 27 reviews. The website's consensus reads, "Following a period of uncertainty and a shift to NBC, Brooklyn Nine-Nine reemerges with its cast and tone wholly intact."
