= Gintars =

- Brooklyn Nine-Nine episode
- Episode no.: Season 6 Episode 10
- Directed by: Linda Mendoza
- Written by: Andy Gosche
- Cinematography by: Rick Page
- Editing by: Jason Gill
- Production code: 611
- Original air date: March 14, 2019
- Running time: 21 minutes

Guest appearances
- Ike Barinholtz as Gintars Irbe; Reggie Lee as Dr. Ronald Yee; Antonio Raul Corbo as Nikolaj Boyle; Jason Grasl as Jasper Norton; Travis Johns as Alan Thinne

Episode chronology
← Previous "The Golden Child"	Next → "The Therapist"
- Brooklyn Nine-Nine season 6

"Gintars" is the tenth episode of the sixth season of the American television police sitcom series Brooklyn Nine-Nine, and the 122nd overall episode of the series. The episode was written by Andy Gosche and directed by Linda Mendoza. It aired on March 14, 2019 on NBC.

The show revolves around the fictitious 99th precinct of the New York Police Department in Brooklyn and the officers and detectives that work in the precinct. In this episode, Boyle meets Nikolaj's birth father and fears that his presence will make Nikolaj no longer want him as his father. This causes Jake to make a drastic decision to get rid of his birth father. Meanwhile, Holt and Amy ask a famed forensic scientist to help in a murder case, much to Rosa's chagrin.

According to Nielsen Media Research, the episode was seen by an estimated 2.05 million household viewers and gained a 0.6/3 ratings share among adults aged 18–49. The episode received generally positive reviews from critics, who praised Joe Lo Truglio's performance in the episode although Jake's actions and the subplot received mixed reviews.

== Plot ==
While walking on the street, Jake (Andy Samberg) and Boyle (Joe Lo Truglio) find that they are being followed by a stranger (Ike Barinholtz). The stranger catches up to them, revealing he only brought a toy for Boyle's son, Nikolaj. They find out that the stranger is a Latvian man called Gintars, Nikolaj's birth father. Gintars claims that his poor financial situation forced him to give Nikolaj up for adoption but claims to have been more successful ever since. He wants to visit him and threatens to never leave the country until he does so.

Jake accepts to take Gintars to meet him, under the condition that he never reveals his real identity. But as soon as he talks to Nikolaj, Gintars reveals him that he is his real father. They start spending more time together and Boyle grows frustrated when Nikolaj starts calling him "Daddy Gintars". Using a connection in the Counterfeiting Taskforce, Jake tricks Gintars to confess that his business brand is plagiarizing Gap. However, Boyle reveals to Jake that he is now okay with Nikolaj and Gintars meeting more frequently just as the police arrive and arrest Gintars for counterfeiting goods, deporting him to Latvia. Boyle gets mad at this as Nikolaj now feels more abandoned. Jake apologizes for his actions, creating hats that Boyle always wanted both of them to wear, making up for the problem.

Meanwhile, Rosa (Stephanie Beatriz) asks Holt (Andre Braugher) for help in a murder case but based on Holt's and Amy's (Melissa Fumero) suggestion, they seek help from famed forensic scientist Dr. Yee (Reggie Lee), much to Rosa's chagrin. Yee's experimental flies serve as the only method of research and brush off Rosa's observations. However, Rosa finds out that the flies are not as advanced as they thought and confronts Yee about this. Yee confesses to faking everything as his research led to nothing. Rosa uses part of his research to make the criminal confess to the murder. Despite their treatment of Rosa, Holt and Amy don't apologize and instead call Yee to notify him that his research actually solved the case.

== Reception ==
=== Viewers ===
According to Nielsen Media Research, the episode was seen by an estimated 2.05 million household viewers and gained a 0.6/3 ratings share among adults aged 18–49. This means that 0.6 percent of all households with televisions watched the episode, while 3 percent of all households watching television at that time watched it. This was a slight increase over the previous episode, which was watched by 1.99 million viewers and a 0.6/3 ratings share. With DVR factored in, the episode was watched by 2.96 million viewers.

=== Critical reviews ===
"Gintars" received generally positive reviews from critics. Allison Shoemaker of The A.V. Club gave the episode a "B+" rating, writing, "The episode, credited to Andy Gosche, pulls a clever bait and switch, seemingly focusing in on the machinations of Gintars, when in reality the dramatic thrust is that of Best Bud #1 and Best Bud #1. The moment in which that clicks into place instantly casts the rest of the episode in a different light."

Alan Sepinwall of Rolling Stone wrote, "'Gintars' is only the second episode so far this season to spotlight the Peralta/Boyle duo. It's a good one — and a rarity for how the show has featured them together, in that it's about Charles asserting himself and pointing out the ways in which Jake can be a bad friend."
