= Return of the King (Brooklyn Nine-Nine) =

- Brooklyn Nine-Nine episode
- Episode no.: Season 6 Episode 15
- Directed by: Melissa Fumero
- Written by: Phil Augusta Jackson
- Cinematography by: Ryan Page
- Editing by: Ryan Neatha Johnson
- Production code: 614
- Original air date: May 2, 2019
- Running time: 21 minutes

Guest appearances
- Chelsea Peretti as Gina Linetti; Antonio Raul Corbo as Nikolaj Boyle; Miranda de Meo as Francesca Griglio; Emma Fassler as Menla Park; Josh Fingerhut as Marvin Lennox; Marcy Jarreau as Jarcy Marreau; Allishia Knotts as Mariah; Dan Lee as Tom Sriver; Amanda Perez as Janelle; Ian Stanley as Bryan Ungerbert

Episode chronology
| ← Previous "Ticking Clocks" | Next → "Cinco de Mayo" |
- Brooklyn Nine-Nine season 6

"Return of the King" is the fifteenth episode of the sixth season of the American television police sitcom series Brooklyn Nine-Nine, and the 127th overall episode of the series. The episode was written by Phil Augusta Jackson and directed by main cast member Melissa Fumero, in her directorial debut. It aired on May 2, 2019 on NBC.

The show revolves around the fictitious 99th precinct of the New York Police Department in Brooklyn and the officers and detectives that work in the precinct. In this episode, Gina contacts Jake and Terry for help after she fears there will be an assassination attempt at one of her conferences. Meanwhile, Boyle receives some parental guidance from Holt after realizing Nikolaj may be a genius and Rosa refuses to accept help from anyone after her hands are bandaged.

According to Nielsen Media Research, the episode was seen by an estimated 1.65 million household viewers and gained a 0.5/3 ratings share among adults aged 18–49. The episode received generally mixed reviews from critics, who expressed disappointment at Gina's return as well as the subplots.

== Plot ==
Since she left the precinct, Gina (Chelsea Peretti) started her own YouTube channel, G-Hive, where she used religious figures to create her own following, reaching 1 million subscribers. She contacts Jake (Andy Samberg) and Terry (Terry Crews) to help her at a ceremony where she needs police protection due to a possible assassin attending.

During their mission, Jake and Terry notice that Gina is being distant with them, even refusing to talk to them for a meeting. During her conference, Jake gets Gina out of danger before a giant sphere falls onto her. However, at her apartment, Jake and Terry find out that Gina lied to them about being sick and went to a party the previous night; Jake speaks to Gina in a robotic, sarcastic manner that tips her off that he's genuinely pissed at her. While Jake tells Gina that he understands she has a new life but doesn't feel like she even wants to be friends with him anymore, she gets stabbed in the back by the real perpetrator. While waiting for the ambulance, Gina and Jake reconcile and resolve to make time for each other in the future. Gina even reunites Terry with his old friend, a star in the Canadian Football League, the following evening.

Meanwhile, Boyle (Joe Lo Truglio) brings Nikolaj (Antonio Raul Corbo) to the precinct where he manages to solve a problem on Holt's (Andre Braugher) board. Holt assumes Nikolaj is a genius and lambastes Boyle for not nurturing his gifts, stating that the child should be sent to an elite boarding school. Once Holt and Charles both realize Nikolaj is not brilliant after all, Holt apologizes to Charles for undermining him. Also, due to an incident, Rosa (Stephanie Beatriz) is forced to use bandages for her hands, which makes her work more difficult although she refuses Amy's (Melissa Fumero) help. She then accidentally gets trapped in a closet but refuses Amy's help. After so many hours, she finally gives in and asks for her help but Amy reassures her she can do it by herself and Rosa uses her head and shoulder to exit the closet.

== Reception ==
=== Viewers ===
According to Nielsen Media Research, the episode was seen by an estimated 1.65 million household viewers and gained a 0.5/3 ratings share among adults aged 18–49. This means that 0.5 percent of all households with televisions watched the episode, while 3 percent of all households watching television at that time watched it. This was a slight decrease over the previous episode, which was watched by 1.69 million viewers and a 0.5/2 ratings share. With these ratings, Brooklyn Nine-Nine was the fourth highest rated show on NBC for the night behind A.P. Bio, Law & Order: Special Victims Unit and Superstore, fifth on its timeslot and thirteenth for the night, behind A.P. Bio, For the People, Miss USA 2019, S.W.A.T., Law & Order: Special Victims Unit, Life in Pieces, Superstore, Mom, Station 19, Grey's Anatomy, Young Sheldon, and The Big Bang Theory.

With DVR factored in, the episode was watched by 2.53 million viewers.

=== Critical reviews ===
"Return of the King" received generally mixed reviews from critics. LaToya Ferguson of The A.V. Club gave the episode a "B−" rating, writing, "As a 'proper' return episode for Gina Linetti, 'Return Of The King' is honestly a bit of a disappointment. As enjoyable as every plot is, there is honestly a lot of steam in a version of this episode that, like 'Four Movements,' is focused more squarely on Gina (and the rest of the Nine-Nine as extensions of that). This is apparent from the cold open, which lets Confucius, Buddha, and Jesus all know that they can, well, suck it. While it’s technically a proficient pop-in and pop-out for a character/actress who was a series regular for over five seasons, the focus on Gina completely blowing everyone off, just to then have her only acknowledge two of these other characters, doesn't sit well. Especially in an episode that was no doubt promoted based on the return of Gina."

Alan Sepinwall of Rolling Stone wrote, "I’ll be happy if Peretti has another guest spot or three over however long Brooklyn has left, but the point of 'Return of the King' is that she's not really part of the gang anymore, and the credits should reflect that." Nick Harley of Den of Geek wrote, "I couldn't help but love this episode because of Gina. From the meme-oir to her mixing Timothee Chalamet and O.D.B. in her vocal warm-ups, the Gina material always lands for me. But the rest of the episode also manages to keep things funny, and most importantly, fresh, and that's why this will likely be remembered as one of the better episodes of the season. Hopefully like Craig Robinson's appearances at the Pontiac Bandit, the show will be good for one Gina-centric episode a season to keep all of us in the G-Hive satisfied."
