= The Golden Child (Brooklyn Nine-Nine) =

- Brooklyn Nine-Nine episode
- Episode no.: Season 6 Episode 9
- Directed by: Claire Scanlon
- Written by: Neil Campbell
- Cinematography by: Rick Page
- Editing by: Jason Gill
- Production code: 610
- Original air date: March 7, 2019
- Running time: 21 minutes

Guest appearances
- Lin-Manuel Miranda as David Santiago; Bertila Damas as Camila Santiago; Jonathan P. Sims as Alfonso Tucker; Dan Warner as Captain Donovan

Episode chronology
← Previous "He Said, She Said"	Next → "Gintars"
- Brooklyn Nine-Nine season 6

"The Golden Child" is the ninth episode of the sixth season of the American television police sitcom series Brooklyn Nine-Nine, and the 121st overall episode of the series. The episode was written by Neil Campbell and directed by Claire Scanlon. It aired on March 7, 2019, on NBC.

The show revolves around the fictitious 99th precinct of the New York Police Department in Brooklyn and the officers and detectives that work in the precinct. In this episode, Jake and Amy reunite with Amy's brother, David, upsetting Amy as her family always viewed him as the Golden Child of the family. David asks for their help in exposing a group of corrupt cops involved with the Brazilian Mob. Meanwhile, Holt assigns Terry and Boyle to act in character to get information from a criminal in the holding room.

According to Nielsen Media Research, the episode was seen by an estimated 1.99 million household viewers and gained a 0.6/3 ratings share among adults aged 18–49. The episode received positive reviews from critics, who praised Lin-Manuel Miranda's guest performance, although the subplot received a less favorable reception.

== Plot ==
In the cold open, Holt orders Jake to prevent Hitchcock from spilling condiments on himself to testify on a case, but their escalating argument over whether it's possible or not causes Hitchcock to dump spaghetti sauce on his clothes.

Jake (Andy Samberg) is joining Amy (Melissa Fumero) on her family dinner. Amy is not happy, since her brother David (Lin-Manuel Miranda) will show up at the dinner and her parents always view him as the "Golden child" of the family, upsetting her.

The dinner starts in bad mood after Jake and Amy find David and her mother (Bertila Damas) arrived an hour early and it gets worse when they find out that David passed his Lieutenant's exam. However, things change when the police arrive and arrest David for finding cocaine on his desk. Amy feels ecstatic about this, as the image of David now is tarnished. She bails him out of jail, where he reveals that he has been investigating corruption in his department which may be affiliated to the Brazilian mob. Despite Amy's objections, Jake has her assist her brother. In a club where the mob hides their money, they manage to find it in an office but they're pursued by mobsters, with Jake captured in the process. Amy stops her rivalry with her brother and has him shoot the tires of the vehicle, crashing it but saving Jake's life. They dine with her mother again and things seem to have improved, although Jake reveals to Amy that he went on a tirade against Amy's mother, prompting them to leave the dinner.

Meanwhile, Boyle (Joe Lo Truglio) assigns Terry (Terry Crews) and Holt (Andre Braugher) to interrogate a criminal by posing in different roles. Holt and Terry are put in the holding room with the criminal, planning to make him think they're criminals to feel confident. However, Boyle's perfectionism and constant interruptions ruin the operation and their covers are blown. But this turns out to be part of Boyle's plan: expose them and have Rosa (Stephanie Beatriz) enter the room in the guise of an arrestee, which enables her to successfully prompt the dealer to reveal his drug supplier. Boyle reveals that he did not reveal this part of his plan to Terry and Holt out of fear that their lack of acting would expose the mission.

== Production ==
In February 2019, it was announced that Lin-Manuel Miranda would guest star in the show as Amy's brother. Miranda, a fan of the series, showed support for the show on the day it was cancelled, tweeting "RENEW BROOKLYN NINE NINE. I ONLY WATCH LIKE 4 THINGS. THIS IS ONE OF THE THINGS #RenewB99".

== Reception ==
=== Viewers ===
According to Nielsen Media Research, the episode was seen by an estimated 1.99 million household viewers and gained a 0.6/3 ratings share among adults aged 18–49. This means that 0.6 percent of all households with televisions watched the episode, while 3 percent of all households watching television at that time watched it. This was a 16% decrease over the previous episode, which was watched by 2.36 million viewers and a 0.7/3 ratings share. With these ratings, Brooklyn Nine-Nine was the third highest rated show on NBC behind Will & Grace and Superstore, sixth on its timeslot and twelfth for the night, behind Gotham, The Orville, Will & Grace, Superstore, Fam, Station 19, S.W.A.T., Mom, Grey's Anatomy, Young Sheldon, and The Big Bang Theory.

=== Critical reviews ===
"The Golden Child" received positive reviews from critics. LaToya Ferguson of The A.V. Club gave the episode a "B+" rating, writing, "The A-plot in 'The Golden Child' is definitely Melissa Fumero's vehicle, but the B-plot gives everyone involved something truly great to play with. Lin-Manuel Miranda's role as a special guest star thankfully doesn't overpower the episode — again, it only makes Fumero stronger — but I'll also say this: David Santiago is no Doug Judy."

Alan Sepinwall of Rolling Stone wrote, "And I would call the teaser — an expertly melodramatic play on a soldier being assigned a suicide mission, only the mission is Jake being asked to keep Hitchcock from spilling condiments on himself all day — an all-timer; but Brooklyn does these comedy shorts so well, so consistently, it’s just another in a long string of great ones." Linda Maleh of Forbes wrote, "The great thing about Miranda's role is that as Amy's brother, he could easily be brought back on for future episodes, assuming, of course, that the show can find time to work around Miranda's busy schedule. Fumero and Miranda have both expressed their wish on Twitter to have him back on the show at some future date, so there's a lot of hope."
