= Cinco de Mayo (Brooklyn Nine-Nine) =

- Brooklyn Nine-Nine episode
- Episode no.: Season 6 Episode 16
- Directed by: Rebecca Asher
- Written by: David Phillips
- Cinematography by: Ryan Page
- Editing by: Ryan Neatha Johnson
- Production code: 616
- Original air date: May 9, 2019
- Running time: 21 minutes

Guest appearances
- Marc Evan Jackson as Kevin Cozner; Winston Story as Bill; Jake Green as Trent; Tony Nunes as Turner

Episode chronology
← Previous "Return of the King"	Next → "Sicko"
- Brooklyn Nine-Nine season 6

"Cinco de Mayo" is the sixteenth episode of the sixth season of the American television police sitcom series Brooklyn Nine-Nine, and the 128th overall episode of the series. The episode was written by David Phillips and directed by Rebecca Asher. It aired on May 9, 2019 on NBC.

The show revolves around the fictitious 99th precinct of the New York Police Department in Brooklyn and the officers and detectives that work in the precinct. In this episode, after having delayed the Halloween heist due to tragic circumstances, the precinct proceeds with the annual heist which takes place on Cinco de Mayo, just as Terry's Lieutenant Exam is coming up and to help him ease the stress.

According to Nielsen Media Research, the episode was seen by an estimated 1.83 million household viewers and gained a 0.6/3 ratings share among adults aged 18–49. The episode received critical acclaim from critics, who praised the cast's performance and writing, admiring how despite the amount of heists, the show still manages to surprise.

== Plot ==
Terry (Terry Crews) feels stressed out with his Lieutenant's Exam coming up soon. To calm him down, Jake (Andy Samberg) suggests having the new "Halloween Heist" edition despite being Cinco de Mayo, due to the Halloween heist being canceled after an explosion took place and they had to help out.

The subject of the heist will be Scully's (Joel McKinnon Miller) bracelet and everyone has until midnight to retrieve it with Scully and Hitchcock (Dirk Blocker) locked in a closet. Jake teams up with Terry, Holt (Andre Braugher) teams up with Amy (Melissa Fumero) and Boyle (Joe Lo Truglio) teams up with Rosa (Stephanie Beatriz). For his plan, Jake uses Scully's twin, Earl, as a distraction for Holt and Amy, giving enough time for Terry to take out Scully and the bracelet. However, Jake locks Terry and Scully in the interrogation room, intending to be the sole winner due to buying an expensive billboard that contains only his name. But his mention of Earl causes Scully to break the glass, allowing them to flee. The trick is exposed to the bullpen, with Scully revealing that Earl slept with his wife.

During their fight, Boyle steals the bracelet from Jake's pocket and delivers it to Rosa, who knocks him unconscious with chloroform and takes him out of the precinct on a package box. She then delivers the bracelet to Holt, revealing to be working together, and puts the bracelet in Cheddar's toy. But their conversation is overheard by one of Jake's microphones and together with Terry, uses a set of tricks to get Cheddar out with the toy and get the bracelet replaced with a fake one. Jake once again betrays Terry but he escapes and exposes the fake bracelet but to their surprise, Kevin (Marc Evan Jackson) has the real bracelet, citing his displeasure with the number of trophies that Holt brought home, exposing his association with Amy. Charles, having escaped from the box, returns and reveals he's associated with his look-a-like Bill (Winston Story) who the rest of the squad had thought to be dead.

Tired of all the backstabbing and arguing, Terry finally calls out the precinct for their actions, citing that they never cared for his stress. However, he accidentally triggers Jakes voice command which causes a billboard to hit him in the face and give him a minor concussion. With his exam in just a few minutes, they take him to the office, which turns out to be empty. Terry then regains consciousness, revealing himself to have planned everything. He faked the Halloween explosion, as it had to happen on a day he could control, sold the billboard to Jake, and during 6 months, incited everyone's behavior which would cause the betrayals, as well as training Cheddar to deliver the bracelet to him just right outside the building. He also reveals he already passed his Lieutenant exam weeks prior to the heist. Everyone celebrates at the bar, where Scully and his twin reconcile.

== Production ==
After Brooklyn Nine-Nine moved from Fox to NBC, the sixth season was scheduled as a mid-season replacement, meaning it premiered later in the television season, well after Halloween. Due to this timing, the traditional Halloween heist episode could not be aired in its usual slot. Instead, the writers adapted the episode to take place on Cinco de Mayo, maintaining the heist tradition while introducing a new holiday theme. This creative decision allowed the show to continue delivering its popular heist episodes despite the shift in the airing schedule.

== Reception ==
=== Viewers ===
According to Nielsen Media Research, the episode was seen by an estimated 1.83 million household viewers and gained a 0.6/3 ratings share among adults aged 18–49. This means that 0.6 percent of all households with televisions watched the episode, while 3 percent of all households watching television at that time watched it. This was a 10% increase over the previous episode, which was watched by 1.65 million viewers and a 0.5/3 ratings share. With these ratings, Brooklyn Nine-Nine was the fourth highest rated show on NBC for the night behind Law & Order: Special Victims Unit and two Superstore episodes, fourth on its timeslot and eleventh for the night, behind Law & Order: Special Victims Unit, S.W.A.T., two Superstore episodes, Life in Pieces, Station 19, Mom, Grey's Anatomy, Young Sheldon, and The Big Bang Theory.

With DVR factored in, the episode was watched by 2.68 million viewers.

=== Critical reviews ===
"Cinco de Mayo" received critical acclaim from critics. LaToya Ferguson of The A.V. Club gave the episode an "A" rating, writing, "So it should come as no surprise to anyone that the Halloween Heist episodes are the hardest ones for the Brooklyn Nine-Nine writers to write, because especially as time goes on, these are episodes that rely on twists and red herrings and betrayal and intricate plotting. Even if they're extremely absurd moments, like Scully busting through a two-way mirror or the secret tasers or… everything that happens to Terry. These episodes are also even more stuffed full of jokes (typically of the insult variety) than most Brooklyn Nine-Nine episodes, and when it comes to quoting them, it's almost impossible to stop. But that's also part of the Heist's trick, because the joke machine helps make moments like the proposal and Terry acing the Lieutenant exam function as an added surprise, a good-spirited one in an episode full of deception and insults. It all just works."

Alan Sepinwall of Rolling Stone wrote, "Now, everyone goes to such ridiculous lengths to try to win this year that I might worry there's nowhere left to take the heist in Season Seven. But I've had that fear before, and the heist episodes keep working. Even the show seems aware of the pressure to keep topping the last one. 'Five heists was enough,' Rosa insists early on in this one. 'Literally nothing new can happen.' But something new did happen, and it was delightful. So I look forward to what comes next, presumably closer to the actual Halloween." Nick Harley of Den of Geek wrote, "The Cinco de Mayo heist was a clever way to explain why the game wasn't taking place on Halloween and proof that these reoccurring episode formats still have plenty of life left in them. There were more surprising twists and turns in this episode than there have been in the entire season so far. God bless the Halloween Heist, and hopefully with the show coming back for season seven, will get another at the correct time of year in five months."
