= Ticking Clocks =

- Brooklyn Nine-Nine episode
- Episode no.: Season 6 Episode 14
- Directed by: Payman Benz
- Written by: Carol Kolb
- Cinematography by: Rick Page
- Editing by: Jason Gill
- Production code: 615
- Original air date: April 25, 2019
- Running time: 21 minutes

Guest appearances
- Sean Astin as Sergeant Knox; Cameron Esposito as Jocelyn Pryce; Madison Leisle as Whitney Gruber; Elaine Lockhart as Officer Gwen; Mona Mira as Barbara Arbara; Olivia Norman as Jenna Pazhley; Shanna Strong as Heather Monitz-Glausch; James Tang as Officer Andrew Li

Episode chronology
← Previous "The Bimbo"	Next → "Return of the King"
- Brooklyn Nine-Nine season 6

"Ticking Clocks" is the fourteenth episode of the sixth season of the American television police sitcom series Brooklyn Nine-Nine, and the 126th overall episode of the series. The episode was written by Carol Kolb and directed by Payman Benz. It aired on April 25, 2019, on NBC.

The show revolves around the fictitious 99th precinct of the New York Police Department in Brooklyn and the officers and detectives that work in the precinct. In this episode, set in real time, the precinct must investigate a hacker that threatens to delete information in the precinct's server, which will not only expose covers but also delete crucial evidence in many cases.

According to Nielsen Media Research, the episode was seen by an estimated 1.69 million household viewers and gained a 0.5/2 ratings share among adults aged 18–49. The episode received positive reviews from critics, who praised the execution of the concept, although some mentioned that the episode's pace still felt slow despite the "high stakes".

== Plot ==
In the cold open, Hitchcock (Dirk Blocker) and Scully (Joel McKinnon Miller) put a frozen lasagna in the microwave, intending that it will be ready in 21 1/2 minutes. However, they discover they ran out of garlic bread and rush to the grocery store. Jake (Andy Samberg) and Rosa (Stephanie Beatriz) are told by Holt (Andre Braugher) that a hacker is trying to break into the precinct's server to expose the cover of many informants and undercover agents, and unless they find the hacker in the next 19 minutes, Holt will have to use his emergency override to erase the server, and because the NYPD only backs it up twice a year, doing so would erase months of evidence and records.

With help from Sergeant Knox (Sean Astin), they find that the hacker is in the precinct. Holt orders a lockdown in the building and has the squad inspect all floors. Amy (Melissa Fumero), who is at a dentist appointment, hurries to the precinct while Terry (Terry Crews) and Boyle (Joe Lo Truglio) struggle to maintain the peace between a group of warring sorority students in the building. Rosa is visited by her girlfriend, Jocelyn, who says she wants to break up with her because they don't spend time together but agrees to stay so they can discuss it. Rosa confesses to Jake that she plans to make things up with her and then break up with her, saying she is "always the dumper, never the dumpee," though she later admits she genuinely wants Jocelyn back and was merely putting on a front.

To complicate matters, the hacker releases the sorority students from their holding cells, causing chaos to break out around the bullpen. Amy, Hitchcock and Scully return to the precinct just as time starts running out. Knox deduces that the hacker is on another floor but the squad finds no one there. Jake then deduces that Knox is the hacker, and Amy remembers he was caught on camera in a crime she's investigating - Knox only executed his plan because he knew Amy would be at the dentist. Jake texts Holt not to delete the information in the nick of time. Knox finds out, and holds Holt at gunpoint. However, a fire in the toaster oven (due to Hitchcock and Scully's burning garlic bread) distracts him, which allows the precinct to arrest him. Jake suggests to Hitchcock and Scully to eat their lasagna without garlic bread. The last scene shows Hitchcock and Scully eating the lasagna.

== Reception ==
=== Viewers ===
According to Nielsen Media Research, the episode was seen by an estimated 1.69 million household viewers and gained a 0.5/2 ratings share among adults aged 18–49. This means that 0.5 percent of all households with televisions watched the episode, while 2 percent of all households watching television at that time watched it. This was a slight decrease over the previous episode, which was watched by 1.78 million viewers and a 0.5/3 ratings share. With these ratings, Brooklyn Nine-Nine was the third highest rated show on NBC for the night behind Law & Order: Special Victims Unit and Superstore, fifth on its timeslot and eleventh for the night, behind Gotham, The Orville, Law & Order: Special Victims Unit, Superstore, S.W.A.T., Life in Pieces, Mom, the 2019 NFL draft, Young Sheldon, and The Big Bang Theory.

With DVR factored in, the episode was watched by 2.58 million viewers.

=== Critical reviews ===
"Ticking Clocks" received positive reviews from critics. LaToya Ferguson of The A.V. Club gave the episode a "B−" rating, writing, "'Ticking Clocks' is a lofty episode of Brooklyn Nine-Nine, but it isn't a great episode. Under other circumstances, it would probably be a weaker episode. This is an episode that really shows how time lapses make things both more interesting and, more importantly, snappier. The episode certainly tries to keep up the pace, whether it’s Amy’s rush to get to work, Rosa’s rush to make up with Jocelyn, Hitchcock and Scully’s rush to properly time their food, or the rush of saving the server (which of course is stretched out for plot purposes, to “the last possible minute”), but it's very difficult to do so with the real-time aspect covering every inch of it. But in terms of the gimmick and its execution, Brooklyn Nine-Nine succeeds. For a first-time attempt at this sort of approach (like a TV pilot), 'Ticking Clocks' is an ambitious episode that maintains its humor in the face of its obstacles. Hopefully the kinks are worked out by next time."

Alan Sepinwall of Rolling Stone wrote, "There's always a danger that if Brooklyn deviates from the formula too often, that will begin to feel like a formula itself. But most of this year's experiments have felt different enough from one another, as well as from more routine outings like 'The Honeypot.' And if people get upset about too many of them, Goor may have to make like Jake right before each commercial break and cry out, 'Mamma Maglione!'" Nick Harley of Den of Geek gave it a 4 star rating out of 5 and wrote, "Still, these stylistic divergences are interesting enough to sacrifice a few gags, especially when they are presented with new camera techniques and solid character work like Rosa’s acknowledgement of her love for Jocelyn. The series may not be able to surprise us much with the cases on a week to week basis, but it certainly still can by stretching out with format experiences and new emotional beats."
