= The Therapist =

The Therapist may refer to:

- The Therapist (film), a 2021 Nigerian drama film
- "The Therapist" (Brooklyn Nine-Nine), a 2019 television episode
- "The Therapist" (The Old Guys), a 2009 television episode

== See also ==
- Therapist, a person who offers any kinds of therapy
- "The Therapists", an episode of Curb Your Enthusiasm
