= Casecation =

- Brooklyn Nine-Nine episode
- Episode no.: Season 6 Episode 12
- Directed by: Beth McCarthy-Miller
- Written by: Luke Del Tredici
- Cinematography by: Rick Page
- Editing by: Ryan Neatha Jackson
- Production code: 612
- Original air date: April 11, 2019
- Running time: 21 minutes

Guest appearances
- Julia Sweeney as Pam; Marc Evan Jackson as Kevin (voice only); Brie Eley as Cheryl; Nikea Gamby-Turner as Nurse Janet; Cooper Mothersbaugh as Craig

Episode chronology
← Previous "The Therapist"	Next → "The Bimbo"
- Brooklyn Nine-Nine season 6

"Casecation" is the twelfth episode of the sixth season of the American television police sitcom series Brooklyn Nine-Nine, and the 124th overall episode of the series. The episode was written by Luke Del Tredici and directed by Beth McCarthy-Miller. It aired on April 11, 2019 on NBC.

The show revolves around the fictitious 99th precinct of the New York Police Department in Brooklyn and the officers and detectives that work in the precinct. In this episode, Jake and Amy have a "casecation" to celebrate their anniversary while watching over a comatose mobster in his hospital room. However, the evening turns into a debate where both discuss their future as parents as both have different opinions on the subject of having children.

According to Nielsen Media Research, the episode was seen by an estimated 1.88 million household viewers and gained a 0.6/3 ratings share among adults aged 18–49. The episode received mixed-to-positive reviews from critics, who praised the subject matter and Andy Samberg's performance, although Amy's characterization was criticized.

== Plot ==
Jake (Andy Samberg) is assigned to watch over a comatose mobster in the hospital, which prevents him from seeing Amy (Melissa Fumero) more often. He suggests that she accompanies him in the hospital room while watching over the mobster to celebrate their anniversary in something called "Casecation" (singing parody lyrics to Vacation).

While remembering their best moments, an older woman named Pam (Julia Sweeney) appears in the room where she praises their relationship and even questions what their children will be. Amy then finds out that despite the fact that she wants children, Jake is not interested in that. Amy then decides to start a debate for both with Holt (Andre Braugher) and Kevin (Marc Evan Jackson) serving as moderators. Jake's initial statements fail due to his lack of preparation, which prompt him to explain to Amy that he is just scared to be dad because of the absence of his father during most of his life. Amy then reveals she is also scared of this. Things appear to improve but when Jake suggests that they can discuss it later, Amy demands that he gives a final answer very soon, feeling tired of waiting years or she could "start over".

Terry (Terry Crews) and Rosa (Stephanie Beatriz) arrive at the hospital, having been alerted that someone will try to kill the mobster. Rosa accompanies Amy where she sides with her choice of having children. Terry, on the other hand, advises Jake to not have children until he is fully ready, citing his constant lack of sleep and free time. Amy and Rosa intercept a hitman but realize it's just a distraction. Jake enters the mobster's room to discover Pam with a bomb, having been hired by a mobster to kill him so her granddaughter gets $500,000. Jake convinces her to put the bomb down and Pam is arrested. The talk with Pam gives Jake more confidence in being a parent although both Amy and Jake agree to have children whenever they are both ready.

== Reception ==
=== Viewers ===
According to Nielsen Media Research, the episode was seen by an estimated 1.88 million household viewers and gained a 0.6/3 ratings share among adults aged 18–49. This means that 0.6 percent of all households with televisions watched the episode, while 3 percent of all households watching television at that time watched it. This was a 12% decrease over the previous episode, which was watched by 2.13 million viewers and a 0.5/3 ratings share. With these ratings, Brooklyn Nine-Nine was the third highest rated show on NBC for the night behind Law & Order: Special Victims Unit and Superstore, fifth on its timeslot and eleventh for the night, behind The Orville, a S.W.A.T. rerun, Law & Order: Special Victims Unit, Fam, Superstore, Station 19, a Young Sheldon rerun, two The Big Bang Theory reruns and Grey's Anatomy.

With DVR factored in, the episode was watched by 2.96 million viewers.

=== Critical reviews ===
"Casecation" received mixed-to-positive reviews from critics. LaToya Ferguson of The A.V. Club gave the episode a "B+" rating, writing, "Really, it's the bookends that hurt 'Casecation,' because it's funny, honest, and necessary episode outside of that. It's also a proper celebration of Jake and Amy's one-year wedding anniversary that doesn't feel like too much... even though there's that whole pesky bomb thing."

Alan Sepinwall of Rolling Stone wrote, "Around this point in Parks and Rec's run, several characters started having kids. That show, wisely, kept the offspring off-camera for the most part. Brooklyn is even more of a workplace show than Parks was, and while Terry's daughters and Nikolaj have appeared occasionally (and are discussed semi-regularly, in the way that any co-worker with kids might do), it's hard to imagine even the central couple's baby suddenly taking over the show in its remaining seasons. As Amy argues to Jake, it's about time they start taking this seriously if they want to do it, and 'Casecation' deftly balanced the serious nature of the debate with the show's usual goofiness." Nick Harley of Den of Geek wrote, "After what felt like a log [sic] hiatus, yet was really just two weeks, it was great to have the Brooklyn Nine-Nine gang back, and especially great to see them focusing on one plot while expertly utilizing their deep bench of characters."
