= Broke (2020 TV series) =

2020 American sitcom

- Genre: Sitcom
- Created by: Alex Herschlag
- Based on: Pobres Rico by: Adriana Lorenzon; Juan Manuel Cáceres; Liliana Guzmán; Guillermo Restrepo; Héctor Alejandro Moncada; Juan Carlos Troncoso
- Starring: Jaime Camil; Pauley Perrette; Natasha Leggero; Izzy Diaz; Antonio Raul Corbo
- Music by: Frank Ciampi
- Country of origin: United States
- Original language: English
- No. of seasons: 1
- No. of episodes: 13

Production
- Executive producers: Alex Herschlag; Jennie Snyder Urman; Joanna Klein; Jaime Camil; Ben Silverman; Howard T. Owens; Guillermo Restrepo; Gonzalo Cilley; Maria Lucia Hernandez
- Producers: Steve Sandoval (pilot only); Pauley Perrette; Kathy Nawabi
- Cinematography: Peter Smokler
- Editors: Chris Poulos; Pamela Marshall
- Camera setup: Multi-camera
- Running time: 21 minutes
- Production companies: Sunshine Bakery Productions; Sutton Street Productions; Propagate; RCN Televisión; CBS Television Studios

Original release
- Network: CBS
- Release: April 2 – June 25, 2020

Broke is an American television sitcom created by Alex Herschlag that aired on CBS from April 2 to June 25, 2020. The series is based on the Colombian series Pobres Rico. The series follows a single mother who takes in her estranged sister and brother-in-law, and their assistant, after the brother-in-law is written out of his trust fund. It stars Jaime Camil, Pauley Perrette (in her final television role), Natasha Leggero, Izzy Diaz, and Antonio Raul Corbo. In May 2020, the series was canceled after one season.

This marked Pauley Perrette's final on-screen appearance before her retirement in July 2020.

== Premise ==
After a wealthy father cuts off his son financially, the son and daughter-in-law move to Reseda, a neighborhood in Los Angeles, to live in the home of the wife's estranged (and more grounded) sister, a working single mother, and her son.

== Cast and characters ==
=== Main ===
- Jaime Camil as Javier, Elizabeth's spoiled but likeable husband and Jackie's brother-in-law who forms a close bond with his nephew, Sammy. Cut off by his wealthy father, Javier is initially obsessed with trying to regain his trust, but he eventually learns to be patient and make the best of his current situation.
- Pauley Perrette as Jackie Dixon, a confident single mother who works as a bartender to support her son, Sammy, while also trying to start her own business. She takes in her sister and brother-in-law when they need a place to live and begins to repair the poor relationship she has with them.
- Natasha Leggero as Elizabeth, Jackie's estranged sister and Javier's wife. Unlike Javier, she struggles to adjust to living without wealth but slowly comes around to the realization that she and her husband have a valuable opportunity to build their own life.
- Izzy Diaz as Luis Dominguez, Javier's assistant and friend, who resides with the family. He and Javier often converse in Spanish. It's revealed that Luis is still being paid by Javier's father as he is the only person who understands him, the two having been raised together.
- Antonio Raul Corbo as Sammy, Jackie's son with an intensely creative mind. He turns 11 years old in the final episode. Unlike his mother, Sammy is thrilled to have more people in the house, as revealed in his voice-over during the opening title sequence.

=== Recurring ===
- Al Madrigal as Derek, the unpleasant manager at Mitzi's, the bar where Jackie works; he is the son of the bar's owner.
- Fred Stoller as Keith, a regular customer at Mitzi's who frequently hits on Jackie.
- Kyle Bornheimer as Barry, Jackie's ex-husband and Sammy's deadbeat father.

=== Guest ===
- Jack McGee as Ernie, Jackie and Elizabeth's hustler father, currently incarcerated for passing fraudulent checks
- Jordan Harvey as himself, the uncle of a player on Sammy's soccer team
- Elizabeth Ho as Christine, the commissioner of Sammy's soccer league who mistreated Elizabeth when they were kids
- Brandon Kyle Goodman as Luke, Luis' romantic interest
- Natalie Ceballos as Paula, a sales representative for Uncle Juan's Tequila, who sponsors a Cinco de Mayo party at Mitzi's
- Cheech Marin as Don Dominguez, Luis' father who works as Javier's father's assistant
- Phil Buckman as Nick Murray, Jackie's rival contractor, Elizabeth's former boyfriend, and son of Ernie's former business partner
- Christopher Thornton as Max Lefleur
- Merrick McCartha as Mario Jones

== Episodes ==
No.	Title	Directed by	Written by	Original release date	U.S viewers (millions)
1	"Pilot"	Victor Gonzalez	Alex Herschlag	April 2, 2020	7.07
When his father cuts him off for being irresponsible with his money, wealthy socialite Javier and his wife Elizabeth are forced to move in with Jackie, Elizabeth's sister who resents her for running off and not visiting her for many years. When Elizabeth reveals that she and Javier only came because they need a place to crash, it triggers an argument and the sisters mutually agree that Elizabeth and her husband should find somewhere else to stay. Things are further complicated when Javier goes behind Jackie's back and persuades her son Sammy's teacher to let him resubmit an unfinished assignment. When Sammy's project reveals how happy he is now that Javier and Elizabeth are in his life, Jackie relents and agrees to let them stay. Javier's father contacts him, saying he won't restore his son's trust fund unless he can prove he deserves it.
2	"Jobs"	Victor Gonzalez	Alex Herschlag & Jennie Snyder Urman	April 9, 2020	5.27
At Jackie's insistence, both Javier and Elizabeth agree to get jobs; Javier and Luis become ride-share drivers while Elizabeth gets herself hired at a Neiman Marcus as a personal shopper. When Jackie visits, Elizabeth tells her she hates having to work for a living and can't wait for Javier's money to be returned to him. Believing that her sister and brother-in-law have no intention of staying, Jackie insists that Sammy stop spending time with them. Elizabeth tells her not to take out her frustrations on Javier, as he has become rather fond of Sammy and is willing to be the father figure he needs in his life. Javier has a private talk with Jackie and urges her to stop projecting the anger she feels at Sammy's father onto him.
3	"The Dance"	Victor Gonzalez	Craig Gerard & Matthew Zinman	April 16, 2020	5.59
When Jackie needs cash for repairs, Javier and Elizabeth concoct a scheme to collect a debt their rich friends Amir and Sandra owe them to avoid having to reveal that they have no money. However, when the couple refuses to help, Javier loses his cool and has Elizabeth intimidate Amir into handing over all the cash in his pocket. Luis learns that Jackie wants a raise but is too afraid of losing her job to ask Derek. He convinces her to quit so he will finally see she's willing to stand up for herself, but he calls her bluff. Jackie is upset that she has no job, but then Derek shows up at her home; his mother Mitzi forces him to admit that Jackie is a valuable employee and that she deserves a raise.
4	"Mom's Secret"	Victor Gonzalez	Al Madrigal	April 23, 2020	4.78
Jackie and Elizabeth discover that their late mother had an affair with a man named Alex. Javier learns from Luis that he has not sent any of the superficial photos his boss has been collecting to convince his father that he is responsible; furious, Javier decides to prove he can handle hard work by taking a day job as a house painter. Elizabeth and Jackie argue about what to do, as Jackie feels that having an affair is poor judgment and that Elizabeth shouldn't try to find Alex. The sisters go anyway, and find out that Alex is female and that their mother chose to break off the affair to protect their family. Javier, now realizing that Luis was right, apologizes and tells him that they will always be brothers.
5	"Dates"	Victor Gonzalez	Rachel Sweet	April 30, 2020	5.07
After discussing how neither Jackie nor Luis has dated in a long time, Elizabeth and Javier decide to set them up with two random strangers. When both dates go terribly, Jackie and Luis both end up at the bar and start to bond, eventually deciding to make it a regular thing. At home, Javier encourages Elizabeth to take the opportunity to spend more time with Sammy, who looks up to her even though she hardly knows him. At first, she is reluctant (especially after losing her engagement ring) but later enjoys playing with Sammy and taking care of him. This leads to Elizabeth considering a once-unthinkable possibility: unfreezing her eggs and having a child with Javier.
6	"Losing My Religion"	Victor Gonzalez	Grace Parra	May 7, 2020	4.80
Sammy discovers church, which upsets Jackie as she still bears a grudge from when her mother died and her prayers to God failed to help. Javier agrees to stop taking him, but then Sammy goes by himself and admits to his mother that he is too curious to stay away. Javier advises his sister-in-law that she should open up about losing her mother to start working past it. Luis is annoyed when he takes Elizabeth to his favorite spin class and the instructor, Luke, takes a liking to her; Elizabeth deduces that Luis has a crush on him and successfully pushes him to ask the instructor out on a date. Jackie makes a big decision by asking Javier and Elizabeth to become Sammy's godparents in case something happens to her.
7	"Daddy Issues"	Victor Gonzalez	Cindy Caponera	May 14, 2020	4.65
Jackie takes Javier with her to visit her father Ernie in prison, as Javier wants to ask for his blessing to marry Elizabeth. To his surprise, Ernie refuses, claiming that Javier is too irresponsible to be a good husband. Luis gives Elizabeth driving lessons, and they bond over their shared experiences with estranged fathers. Luis secretly calls his father, saying he's ready to patch things up. An enraged Elizabeth goes to see Ernie, who admits the whole thing was a con intended to force her to see him for the first time in years. Realizing that everyone in her family has become too accustomed to lying, Jackie makes her sister and father promise to start being honest with each other and Ernie gives Javier his blessing.
8	"Soccer"	Victor Gonzalez	Julian Kiani	May 21, 2020	4.31
The youth soccer league commissioner, Christine, bans Jackie from attending games after she verbally abuses a referee. The team's coach quits under the stress, and Javier volunteers for the job. Unfortunately, Javier is so well-versed in soccer schemes that he over-complicates things for the kids, and Luis is asked to take over. Javier refuses, but Elizabeth convinces him to put his friend's needs first and he relinquishes his position. Christine rudely refuses to accept Jackie's apology for her actions, so Elizabeth blackmails her with information concerning a rule violation that could get her removed, which forces Christine to overturn her sister's punishment. Luis decides to retire from coaching when professional player Jordan Harvey agrees to be his replacement.
9	"Barry's Back"	Katy Garretson	Aaron Izek & Jenna Martin	May 28, 2020	4.45
Jackie's ex Barry visits her, which gives Jackie the chance to ask him to grant her sole custody of Sammy. Unfortunately, things get complicated when Javier tries to fix things between Jackie and Barry against her wishes, and Barry asks his ex-wife to let him be more involved in parenting Sammy. Javier tries to find the perfect gift for his father's birthday and settles on a handwritten letter expressing how much he misses the close relationship they once had when he was a boy. Luis takes an important step in his own relationship with Luke. Barry becomes jealous of Javier's fatherly bond with Sammy, and Jackie responds by yelling that Barry will never be a good father because he's never there when Sammy needs him. The next day, Barry surprises her by revealing that he is moving back to Reseda.
10	"Sammy's Project"	Katy Garretson	Craig Gerard & Matthew Zinman	June 4, 2020	4.05
After Jackie takes a temporary second job, Barry offers to help Sammy with an ambitious homework assignment: creating a map of the US out of clay, but it goes horribly wrong. Javier and Elizabeth also help Sammy with a visual timeline of American history, during which Elizabeth scolds Javier for refusing to plan for the future. Barry tells Javi that waiting around for something to happen hasn't worked out for him, so he develops a timeline of his and Elizabeth's relationship, complete with a plan to find their own place and start saving money over the next five years. That night, Jackie talks to a disappointed Sammy, telling him to never stop thinking big. She and Barry work all night fixing Sammy's map, and start to mend their broken relationship. Meanwhile, Luis can barely move after going mountain biking with Luke.
11	"Cinco De Mayo"	Phill Lewis	Al Madrigal	June 11, 2020	4.08
For Cinco de Mayo, Jackie arranges for Uncle Juan's Tequila to sponsor a party at the bar, having been promised a lavish bonus by the company representative, Paula. Javier is hired as the emcee, but sinks into depression when he learns that he is not welcome to join his family in Mexico for Mother's Day. Javier's spirits are lifted some after he wins a hot pepper eating contest, then Elizabeth and Luis step up and help him realize that he already has a family with Jackie and Sammy. Jackie catches Barry flirting with Paula and sabotages their relationship out of jealousy, ruining her chance to earn the bonus and take Sammy on a promised trip to the San Diego Zoo. Javier steals a corporate check meant for Derek to help pay for the trip instead. Jackie and Barry discuss their home life, and while Barry wants to give their marriage another try, Jackie forces him to accept that such a thing will never happen.
12	"The Test"	Phill Lewis	Rachel Sweet	June 18, 2020	3.61
When Luis hears his father, Don Dominguez (Cheech Marin), is arriving to visit for the first time since Luis came out three years ago, he hopes it's to reconcile and accept his son for who he is. Instead, Don says he was sent by Javier's father to assess Javier and determine if he's learned the value of money and hard work. Meanwhile, Jackie gets an opportunity to do some handy work at a nursing home, hoping it will be the project she needs to start her own contracting business. She arrives and finds that Nick Murray, son of her father's former partner who ratted him out and put him in jail, has also been hired. As Jackie finds herself in competition with Nick for a larger project at the site, she hires Elizabeth to help her. Elizabeth sees that Nick, her former high school boyfriend, still has feelings for her, and tries to use that to Jackie's advantage. Having sweated out the notes that Don has been writing in his little book, Javier eventually shoves that aside and stands up for Luis when Don is still reluctant to reconcile.
13	"Sammy's Party"	James Widdoes	Alex Herschlag	June 25, 2020	3.68
Jackie continues to express annoyance at Javier and Elizabeth being freeloaders, so they finally decide to look for a place of their own. However, the only apartment they can afford is filthy and cramped. Nevertheless, the couple is happy that they have a chance to live a life of their own, and file an application. The laser tag arena Jackie hired to host Sammy's birthday party is forced to cancel, so she, Luis, Barry, Javier and Elizabeth raid Mitzi's for food and supplies. As the party comes together in the back yard, Javier and Elizabeth reflect over how much more fulfilled they feel by forging their own path without money, while Jackie realizes her relatives are leaving just as she's gotten used to them. Ultimately, she relents and asks them to stay for as long as they want. Noticing all the talents Luis displayed while planning Sammy's party, Javier tells him it's okay if he wants to leave his assistant job, but Luis says he's more than happy to continue in that role. Just as the party is about to begin, a helicopter suddenly lands and blows away the bouncy house, revealing Jackie and Barry kissing. A man steps out, and Javier confirms it is his father.

== Production ==
=== Development ===
On February 22, 2019, it was announced that CBS had given the production a pilot order. The pilot was written by Alex Herschlag who executive produces alongside Jennie Urman Snyder, Camil, Ben Silverman, Joanna Klein, Victor Gonzalez, Gonzalo Cilley, Guillermo Restrepo, and Maria Lucia Hernandez Frieri. Production companies involved with the pilot include Propagate, RCN TV, Resonant TV, Sutton Street Productions and CBS Television Studios. On May 6, 2019, it was announced that the production had been given a series order under the name of Broke. A few days later, it was announced that the series would premiere as a mid-season replacement in the winter-spring of 2020. The series premiered on April 2, 2020. On May 6, 2020, CBS canceled the series after one season, and the series finale aired on June 25, 2020.

=== Casting ===
In February 2019, it was announced that Jaime Camil had been cast in the pilot's lead role. Although the pilot was ordered, in March 2019, it was reported that former NCIS star Pauley Perrette and Natasha Leggero had joined the cast. Along with the announcement of the series order, Izzy Diaz and Antonio Corbo were cast as series regulars.

=== Filming ===
Broke was filmed at Radford Studio Center in Studio City, California, but it is set in Los Angeles, California.

== Release ==
=== Marketing ===
On May 15, 2019, CBS released the first official trailer for the series.

== Reception ==
On Rotten Tomatoes, the series holds an approval rating of 60% based on 5 reviews, with an average rating of 4.25/10. On Metacritic, the series has a weighted average score of 38 out of 100, based on 5 critics, indicating "generally unfavorable reviews".

=== Ratings ===
Viewership and ratings per episode of Broke
No.	Title	Air date	Rating/share (18–49)	Viewers (millions)	DVR (18–49)	DVR viewers (millions)	Total (18–49)	Total viewers (millions)
1	"Pilot"	April 2, 2020	0.9/4	7.07	0.3	1.87	1.20	8.95
2	"Jobs"	April 9, 2020	0.7/3	5.27	0.3	1.62	1.0	6.89
3	"The Dance"	April 16, 2020	0.7/3	5.59	0.3	1.48	0.9	7.07
4	"Mom's Secret"	April 23, 2020	0.6/2	4.78	0.2	1.25	0.8	6.01
5	"Dates"	April 30, 2020	0.6/3	5.07	0.2	1.27	0.8	6.34
6	"Losing My Religion"	May 7, 2020	0.6/3	4.80	0.2	1.43	0.9	6.23
7	"Daddy Issues"	May 14, 2020	0.6/3	4.65	0.2	1.14	0.8	5.79
8	"Soccer"	May 21, 2020	0.5/3	4.31	0.2	1.11	0.7	5.42
9	"Barry's Back"	May 28, 2020	0.6/3	4.45	0.2	1.12	0.8	5.57
10	"Sammy's Project"	June 4, 2020	0.6/3	4.05	0.2	1.05	0.7	5.10
11	"Cinco De Mayo"	June 11, 2020	0.6/3	4.08	0.2	1.07	0.8	5.15
12	"The Test"	June 18, 2020	0.5/2	3.61	0.2	1.03	0.6	4.64
13	"Sammy's Party"	June 25, 2020	0.5/2	3.68	0.1	0.77	0.6	4.45
