= He Said, She Said (Brooklyn Nine-Nine) =

- Brooklyn Nine-Nine episode
- Episode no.: Season 6 Episode 8
- Directed by: Stephanie Beatriz
- Written by: Lang Fisher
- Cinematography by: Rick Page
- Editing by: Ryan Neatha Johnson
- Production code: 609
- Original air date: February 28, 2019
- Running time: 21 minutes

Guest appearances
- Briga Heelan as Keri Brennan; Jonathan Chase as Seth Haggerty; Gabe Liedman as Dr. Oliver Cox; Matt Lowe as Beefer/Steve; Michael Albala as Albert; Hardy Awadjie as Geoff Havili; Mark Beltzman as Lyle; E.J. Callahan as Ernest Zumowski; Magnus Chhan as Trent; Tony Evangelista as Cam; Richard Finkelstein as Disco Strangler; Krista Kalmus as Paula; Jennifer Neala Page as Regina Park; Toni Robinson-May as Alexandra; Peter James Smith as Ron

Episode chronology
| ← Previous "The Honeypot" | Next → "The Golden Child" |
- Brooklyn Nine-Nine season 6

"He Said, She Said" is the eighth episode of the sixth season of the American television police sitcom series Brooklyn Nine-Nine, and the 120th overall episode of the series. The episode was written by Lang Fisher and directed by cast member Stephanie Beatriz, making her directorial debut. It aired on February 28, 2019 on NBC.

The show revolves around the fictitious 99th precinct of the New York Police Department in Brooklyn and the officers and detectives that work in the precinct. In this episode inspired by the Me Too movement, Jake and Amy investigate a case of sexual assault in a company and get in a dilemma when the victim plans to accept a deal to not say anything, which proves to be too personal for Amy. Meanwhile, Holt investigates the death of a criminal he caught years ago, convinced that he faked his death and escaped despite evidence proving otherwise.

According to Nielsen Media Research, the episode was seen by an estimated 2.36 million household viewers and gained a 0.7/3 ratings share among adults aged 18–49. The episode received acclaim from critics, who praised Melissa Fumero's acting, Stephanie Beatriz's directing and its handling of the subject matter, as well as the highly comedic B-Story highlighting Andre Braugher.

== Plot ==
Holt (Andre Braugher) assigns Jake (Andy Samberg) to investigate the case of a businessman, Seth Haggerty (Jonathan Chase), who suffered a broken penis. Jake finds this hilarious but his smile vanishes when Holt finishes the story: Haggerty suffered his injury during an alleged sexual assault attempt. Amy (Melissa Fumero) volunteers to work with Jake on the case and is granted a temporary assignment to the Detective Squad.

Jake and Amy interrogate Haggerty, who presents himself as pro-woman and says his accuser is fabricating her story because he was not interested in her advances. They talk to Keri Brennan (Briga Heelan), the financial analyst who reported the sexual assault and broke his penis. Amy tells her to file charges but Keri changes her mind as the company offered a $2.5 million settlement if she signs a non-disclosure agreement against him; she also thinks her word would not be enough to change the system. Amy convinces her to let them investigate.

Rosa (Stephanie Beatriz) overhears their conversation in the break room. To Amy's surprise, Rosa says Keri should take the deal, because she feels her life will be negatively affected by pressing charges, even if she wins the case. They interview her co-workers, and notice that all of them state mirroring platitudes that everything at the company is "professional". Haggerty's lawyer says that Keri will be terminated for injuring Haggerty.

Amy reveals to Jake that the case is personal for her as the captain at her previous precinct, whom she had viewed as her mentor, once tried to kiss her after he helped her become a detective, feeling she "owed him" — which resulted in her immediate transfer to the 99th precinct. She never told this to anyone, fearing that she would lose out on other promotions. Jake decides to continue helping her and seeks evidence from a co-worker named Beefer, who reveals Haggerty has a text chain with many men in the company where they talk about sexual incidents in the office; Beefer makes it clear that he is helping them solely because having his co-worker's career ruined will earn him a huge promotion. Haggerty is charged with sexual assault but Keri quits the company, feeling she does not have any chance of advancing in the field but stating she has no regrets about pursuing justice. Amy feels saddened but Rosa assures her she helped by showing that one of Keri's co-workers has come forward with her own story.

Meanwhile, Holt is notified that a criminal he caught years ago, Ernest Zumowski (also known as The Disco Strangler), has died during a prison transport. However, Holt is convinced that he faked his death to escape, despite the fact that the killer is over 80 years old and the body's DNA matches with that of Zumowski. A camera reveals Zumowski did fake his death and fled through the woods. Leading a team through the city, Holt manages to recapture Zumowski, though the moment does not feel as satisfying as Holt thought now that Zumowski is an elderly man.

== Production ==
The episode marked Stephanie Beatriz's directorial debut, becoming the first cast member of the series to direct an episode. She stated that NBC ordering 5 more episodes to the season allowed her to ask Dan Goor and David Miner if she could direct an episode, which they allowed. When she was given the script, she said "I felt full of ideas. I felt compelled to tell this story as honestly as I could. Mostly, I felt a very strange yet solid trust that the director who could do this was already inside me." During the production of the episode, she expressed some doubts regarding her job but kept asking herself, "What would Ava DuVernay do?"

Beatriz explained that she received help from Kyra Sedgwick after working on The Closer and on the show itself. She also received help from fellow directors in the show. She said "I had to think about the honest world of Brooklyn Nine-Nine. Yes, there's truth and honesty in our world, but it's also very heightened and moves very quickly. In that way, it's just like a style. We have a style on this show that is very specific and was set up by [directors] Phil Lord and Christopher Miller on the pilot. It's snappy, fast-moving, kind of zany, really charming style. I just had to trust I knew what that style was because I've been working in that world, in that style of comedy, for a little while."

== Reception ==
=== Viewers ===
According to Nielsen Media Research, the episode was seen by an estimated 2.36 million household viewers and gained a 0.7/3 ratings share among adults aged 18–49. This means that 0.7 percent of all households with televisions watched the episode, while 3 percent of all households watching television at that time watched it. This was a slight increase over the previous episode, which was watched by 2.35 million viewers and a 0.8/4 ratings share. With these ratings, Brooklyn Nine-Nine was the second highest rated show on NBC behind The Titan Games, fifth on its timeslot and ninth for the night, behind The Orville, Fam, a Mom rerun, a Young Sheldon rerun, The Titan Games, A Million Little Things, a The Big Bang Theory rerun, and Grey's Anatomy.

With DVR factored in, the episode was watched by 3.24 million viewers.

=== Critical reviews ===
"He Said, She Said" received critical acclaim from critics. LaToya Ferguson of The A.V. Club gave the episode an "A" rating, writing, "It matters that this is also a hilarious episode, with the A-plot showing how you can actually make this type of story funny and the B-plot giving Andre Braugher even more material for his necessary Emmy reel."

Alan Sepinwall of Rolling Stone wrote, "On the whole, 'He Said, She Said' does an impressive job of incorporating a sensitive discussion into the show's usual mission of getting laughs. (And the B-story, where Captain Holt correctly refuses to believe that his oft-discussed nemesis, the Disco Strangler, has died, was pure comedy.) But it also raised some questions about the series that the episode either didn't have the time or the interest to answer." Emily St. James of Vox wrote, "That makes 'He Said, She Said' a curious, knotty episode of an increasingly curious and knotty TV show. But it also means that the episode ends with a surprisingly optimistic call to arms, a gentle insistence that if we let women tell their stories and believe them when they do, we might find those stories are just as compelling as the old, threadbare ones we've been telling for too long. It's easy to get laughs by being mean. It's not easy to get them by being nice, but maybe the attempt is enough."

Liz Shannon Miller of IndieWire gave it a "B+" rating and wrote, "It is, I believe, Brooklyn Nine-Nine doing what it does best: subtly discussing social issues through a multifaceted and complex lens while taking you on a comedy joyride. 'Joyride' isn't strictly accurate; it's a dark episode, one which may invoke a lot of feelings in the women who watch, who recognize their experiences on screen. But 'He Said, She Said' does continue to move the conversation around how to develop #MeToo stories on screen — and conversation in general around this issue, and awareness of its complexities, is essential to perhaps one day solving it." Marissa Martinelli of Slate gave it a "B+" rating and wrote, "'He Said, She Said' handles misconduct with both humor and sensitivity, from the corporate culture closing ranks around one of its own to the case’s outcome, which is optimistic without being overly sunny. Ultimately, the episode argues against its own singularity, as in a poignant scene in which Amy reveals she has been the victim of workplace harassment, something she has in common with 'literally every woman I know.' If the writers really want to stress just how widespread stories like Amy's and Keri's are, they might consider revisiting the topic in Season 7, because sexism, harassment, and assault are everyday occurrences that can't be comprehensively addressed in a single episode, even one as thoughtful as 'He Said, She Said.' There's nothing Very Special about them."
