= Sicko (Brooklyn Nine-Nine) =

- Brooklyn Nine-Nine episode
- Episode no.: Season 6 Episode 17
- Directed by: Matthew Nodella
- Written by: Justin Noble
- Cinematography by: Ryan Page
- Editing by: Jason Gill
- Production code: 617
- Original air date: May 16, 2019
- Running time: 21 minutes

Guest appearances
- Kyra Sedgwick as Chief Wuntch; Ken Marino as Captain Jason "C.J." Stentley; Tim Meadows as Caleb John Gosche; Travis Coles as "Broadway" Brian Floomryde; Gabe Liedman as Dr. Oliver Cox; Phil Reeves as Commissioner John Kelly; Dean Winters as Keith "The Vulture" Pembroke; Tim Kalpakis as Micah Simmons; Celeste Pechous as Monica; Madeline Walter as GIF Woman

Episode chronology
← Previous "Cinco de Mayo"	Next → "Suicide Squad"
- Brooklyn Nine-Nine season 6

"Sicko" is the seventeenth episode of the sixth season of the American television police sitcom series Brooklyn Nine-Nine, and the 129th overall episode of the series. The episode was written by Justin Noble and directed by Matthew Nodella. It aired on May 16, 2019 on NBC, airing back-to-back with the next episode, "Suicide Squad".

The show revolves around the fictitious 99th precinct of the New York Police Department in Brooklyn and the officers and detectives that work in the precinct. In this episode, Jake and Boyle investigate a murder and face pressure from Commissioner Kelly to use his new app which allows civilians to submit evidence to the police, while also facing pressure from Holt not to do so. Meanwhile, Terry faces transference to another precinct as the precinct won't cover his Lieutenant status raise.

According to Nielsen Media Research, the episode was seen by an estimated 1.63 million household viewers and gained a 0.5/3 ratings share among adults aged 18–49. The episode received positive reviews from critics, who praised the writing and the surveillance theme, with many expressing that it perfectly sets up the season finale.

== Plot ==
In the cold open, Jake attempts to prank Holt by altering the podium, but after being warned by Amy and the other squad members that he'll either be mad or won't fall for it, he settles for just moving it half an inch, which drives Holt to laughter.

Holt (Andre Braugher) assigns a murder case to Jake (Andy Samberg) and Boyle (Joe Lo Truglio). Commissioner Kelly appears, advising them to use his new app, HotClues, which allows civilians to send tips to the police. To prove how useless the app can be, Holt tells them not to use the app for help.

Without a single lead, Jake and Boyle visit Jake's prison friend Caleb (Tim Meadows), who tells them that a Reddit user could be the prime suspect and the serial killer. Taunted by Kelly, they end up using a tip from HotClues to identify the killer's hotel room, but the killer manages to escape. Another visit to Caleb makes them realize the killer is looking for a heart transplant and the files reveal that Angelo Rinaldi, a member of a crime family, is the person who solicited a transplant. They arrest him and Holt apologizes to Kelly, thanking him for the app. However, they discover that Kelly's assistant submitted the tip; they further discover that HotClues uses illegal wiretapping throughout all electronic devices in the area to get information. They find after confronting Kelly that they can't reveal any of this, because any criminals that were jailed thanks to the app would be released; in addition, Kelly obtained private text messages where Holt says he wants to do anything to get rid of him, which would discredit him should he go public about Kelly's scheme and ruin his career. In order to help them fight Kelly, Jake assembles a team of people that are "not loyal to anybody": Chief Wuntch (Kyra Sedgwick), Captain Jason "C.J." Stentley (Ken Marino), and Keith "The Vulture" Pembroke (Dean Winters).

Meanwhile, newly-promoted Lieutenant Terry (Terry Crews) finds out that due to the precinct's limited budget not covering his raise, he will be transferred to a Staten Island precinct. Unable to reduce the budget for everything, he realizes the only way for him to stay with his raise in the precinct would be firing somebody. He then talks to an office worker named Brian (Travis Coles) and encourages him to follow his dreams on Broadway, which allows him to avoid firing him. The plan works and Brian announces his plans to quit, but Terry realizes Brian is a terrible singer and won't triumph on Broadway. Seeing that Brian has a family with a poor financial situation, Terry admits that Brian can't sing and convinces him to stay in the precinct, which means Terry will be transferred.

== Reception ==
=== Viewers ===
According to Nielsen Media Research, the episode was seen by an estimated 1.63 million household viewers and gained a 0.5/3 ratings share among adults aged 18–49. This means that 0.5 percent of all households with televisions watched the episode, while 3 percent of all households watching television at that time watched it. This was a 11% decrease over the previous episode, which was watched by 1.83 million viewers and a 0.6/3 ratings share. With these ratings, Brooklyn Nine-Nine was the fourth highest rated show on NBC for the night behind two Superstore episodes and Law & Order: Special Victims Unit, fourth on its timeslot and tenth for the night, behind two Superstore episodes, Law & Order: Special Victims Unit, Station 19, S.W.A.T., Grey's Anatomy, Unraveling the Mystery: A Big Bang Farewell, Young Sheldon, and The Big Bang Theory.

With DVR factored in, the episode was watched by 2.55 million viewers.

=== Critical reviews ===
"Sicko" received positive reviews from critics. LaToya Ferguson of The A.V. Club gave the episode a "B" rating, writing, "'Sicko' is a solid episode for setting up the next episode, but it is a great episode for the return of Jake's prison roommate/cannibal friend Caleb. But mostly, this episode is an exposition dump with a great burn on Reddit and a surprising The Durrells in Corfu mention. The particular 'serial killer' case is all a means to the HotClues app reveal despite the initial bidding war between Jake, Rosa, and Boyle to even get the case. Talk about a bait and switch."

Alan Sepinwall of Rolling Stone wrote, "With the Season Seven renewal coming relatively early, it seemed inevitable that we'd head back into cliffhanger territory. And at first, that's where 'Sicko' and 'The Suicide Squad' seem to be going. 'Sicko' resumes the rivalry between Holt and Commissioner Kelly with the introduction of Kelly's anonymous tips app, HotClues, then takes a twist at the end revealing that the app is just cover for Kelly's Dark Knight-esque illegal wiretapping operation." Nick Harley of Den of Geek gave the episode a 4 star rating out of 5 and wrote, "In its two-part season finale, Brooklyn Nine-Nine delivers all of its best, most reliable tricks; there's an internal fight against police corruption, a wealth of returning supporting characters, a twisty plot, and plenty of rapid-fire jokes."
