= The Honeypot (Brooklyn Nine-Nine) =

- Brooklyn Nine-Nine episode
- Episode no.: Season 6 Episode 7
- Directed by: Phil Augusta Jackson
- Written by: Carol Kolb
- Cinematography by: Giovani Lampassi
- Editing by: Jason Gill
- Production code: 607
- Original air date: February 21, 2019
- Running time: 21 minutes

Episode chronology
← Previous "The Crime Scene"	Next → "He Said, She Said"
- Brooklyn Nine-Nine season 6

"The Honeypot" is the seventh episode of the sixth season of the American television police sitcom series Brooklyn Nine-Nine, and the 119th overall episode of the series. The episode was written by Carol Kolb and directed by Phil Augusta Jackson. It aired on February 21, 2019 on NBC.

The show revolves around the fictitious 99th precinct of the New York Police Department in Brooklyn and the officers and detectives that work in the precinct. In this episode, Jake (Andy Samberg) and Holt (Andre Braugher) discover that Holt's new assistant is actually a spy sent by Commissioner Kelly and decide to use the assistant to spy on Kelly themselves. Meanwhile, Amy (Melissa Fumero) tries to clean out the precinct and discovers a truth about Terry (Terry Crews).

According to Nielsen Media Research, the episode was seen by an estimated 2.35 million household viewers and gained a 0.8/4 ratings share among adults aged 18–49. The episode received positive reviews from critics, who praised the characterization, Karan Soni's guest performance, and both the main plot and subplot.

== Plot ==
In the cold open, Jake, Rosa, and Holt start experiencing events in slow motion after having too much of Boyle's new cold brew coffee.

Jake (Andy Samberg) struggles to find a new assistant for Holt (Andre Braugher) since Gina’s departure from the precinct. Eventually, Jake finds a good candidate, Gordon Lundt (Karan Soni), however Holt claims that during the interview, Gordon was flirting with him.

Eventually, Jake and Holt discover that Gordon was a mole sent by Commissioner John Kelly (Phil Reeves) to spy on the precinct. Holt distracts Gordon by taking him to a barrel museum and infodumps him, but the next day, Gordon approaches them and confirms their suspicions, but tells them that he has fallen in love with Holt for real. Jake suggests using Gordon as a double agent to spy on Kelly, which Holt reluctantly agrees to. However, Gordon triple-crosses them, and Kelly reveals that he plans to twist the story to ruin Holt’s career. But Holt reveals that he got Kelly’s confession on tape, and sends Kelly a list of his demands in retaliation.

Meanwhile, Amy (Melissa Fumero), tired of how cluttered the precinct is (due to Kelly moving the entire precinct to the bullpen), tries to get people to get rid of their personal belongings. She struggles to get Terry (Terry Crews) to get rid of a pair of suspenders he has grown attached to. Eventually, Terry reveals that he was planning on wearing the suspenders on his first day as a Lieutenant, but stashed them away after he failed the Lieutenant’s Exam. Amy, feeling guilty, buys him another pair and assures him that he will pass the test someday. Later, the precinct is restored to its former glory, due to Holt sending Kelly a list of his demands.

== Reception ==
=== Ratings ===
According to Nielsen Media Research, the episode was seen by an estimated 2.35 million household viewers and gained a 0.8/4 ratings share among adults aged 18–49. This means that 0.8 percent of all households with televisions watched the episode, while 4 percent of all households watching television at that time watched it.

=== Critical reviews ===
"The Honeypot" received positive reviews from critics. Kayla Kumari Upadhyaya of The A.V. Club gave the episode an "A−" rating, writing, "[The Honeypot] ends up being a pretty plot-driven episode, Jake and Holt working together to try to figure out if Holt’s droll new assistant was planted by the commissioner to seduce Holt and spy on him. All the comedy about Holt’s idea of what flirting looks like is hilarious. Holt’s rivalry with the commissioner has been a big part of this season, and the commissioner is a solid villain for the show, so it’s fun to watch Holt and Jake pull one over on him in the end. The fact that Holt borrows a bit of Jake’s line of thinking by studying spy movies is a nice little touch that plays into their unlikely but very heartfelt friendship."

Upadhyay also wrote of the subplot, "What initially seems mostly like just a fun little subplot about the co-workers lighting their stuff on fire (when Marie Kondo-ing the office doesn’t work, Amy has to take more drastic measures) ends up landing in a surprisingly emotional place that centers another interpersonal relationship. Amy and Terry have a really sweet moment after he admits to her the real reason why he’s hanging on to unopened suspenders. He’s still feeling low about failing the lieutenant exam, and the suspenders represent that. 'Some things are worth clinging to,' he says, transforming the subplot into something much more meaningful. This show always manages to bring a lot of heart to the table."
