= The Therapist (Brooklyn Nine-Nine) =

- Brooklyn Nine-Nine episode
- Episode no.: Season 6 Episode 11
- Directed by: Rebecca Addelman
- Written by: Jeff Topolski
- Cinematography by: Rick Page
- Editing by: Ryan Neatha Johnson
- Production code: 608
- Original air date: March 21, 2019
- Running time: 21 minutes

Guest appearances
- David Paymer as Dr. Tate; Cameron Esposito as Jocelyn; Fran Gillespie as Sheena; Anna Khaja as Dr. Theresa Moore; Kimberly Condict as Wendy Polm; Sonje Fortag as Tanya Grubvic

Episode chronology
← Previous "Gintars"	Next → "Casecation"
- Brooklyn Nine-Nine season 6

"The Therapist" is the eleventh episode of the sixth season of the American television police sitcom series Brooklyn Nine-Nine, and the 123rd overall episode of the series. The episode was written by Jeff Topolski and directed by Rebecca Addelman. It aired on March 21, 2019 on NBC.

The show revolves around the fictitious 99th precinct of the New York Police Department in Brooklyn and the officers and detectives that work in the precinct. In this episode, Jake and Boyle investigate the death of a patient that attended therapy with a known therapist. In two subplots, Holt wants to meet Rosa's new girlfriend and Amy sets to find out who owns a book that helps improve sex life.

According to Nielsen Media Research, the episode was seen by an estimated 2.13 million household viewers and gained a 0.5/3 ratings share among adults aged 18–49. The episode received generally mixed-to-positive reviews from critics, who praised the subject matter although its execution and subplots received criticism.

== Plot ==
In the cold open, while only speaking words that begin with the letter "B", Jake invents a new game called "Boyle Bullpen Bottle Bowling" alongside a babushka.

Jake (Andy Samberg) helps Boyle (Joe Lo Truglio) with a case focused on the disappearance of a patient of a known therapist, Dr. Tate (David Paymer). Tate is convinced that the patient's significant other may be involved in the case. During this, Terry (Terry Crews) is surprised to see that Jake never went to therapy to help with his multiple issues throughout the series.

After finding the body, Jake and Boyle investigate a prime suspect's apartment but Tate is also with them. After he quickly identifies a lead, Jake is convinced that Tate is the killer and inspects his office, finding a secret book about the victim. As Tate approaches his office, Jake hides himself in another office and fakes being a new patient suffering from dissociative identity disorder. After leaving the office with the book, Jake is held at gunpoint by Tate, who confesses the crime. Jake starts opening up about his problems with therapy, which is actually a distraction so Boyle can track his phone and arrest Tate. Jake then confesses to Boyle that his talk with Tate prompted him to seek more treatment and plans an appointment with a doctor.

Meanwhile, Holt (Andre Braugher) invites Rosa (Stephanie Beatriz) and her new girlfriend Jocelyn to dine with him and Kevin. Rosa declines, explaining that Holt tends to be very judgmental. She eventually agrees to set up a meeting. During a meeting, Holt finds out that the person was an actress hired by Rosa and storms out. He eventually meets Jocelyn (Cameron Esposito) in the precinct where they both bond about being judgmental. Rosa confesses that she didn't want him to meet her as she feared he wouldn't like her and both reconcile. Amy (Melissa Fumero) brings stuff to Terry, which includes How to Please Your Wife: 100 Tips to Take Your Sex Life From Blah to Ahhhh, a sex book. Terry maintains that he never ordered the book and even posts flyers around the bullpen to ask for the real owner. Scully (Joel McKinnon Miller) shows up to pick up the book, claiming to be the owner. However, it's revealed that Terry is in fact the book owner and had Scully pretend to be so he wouldn't be embarrassed.

== Reception ==
=== Viewers ===
According to Nielsen Media Research, the episode was seen by an estimated 2.13 million household viewers and gained a 0.5/3 ratings share among adults aged 18–49. This means that 0.5 percent of all households with televisions watched the episode, while 3 percent of all households watching television at that time watched it. This was a slight increase over the previous episode, which was watched by 2.05 million viewers and a 0.6/3 ratings share. With these ratings, Brooklyn Nine-Nine was the lowest rated show on NBC for the night behind A.P. Bio, Will & Grace, Law & Order: Special Victims Unit and Superstore, fifth on its timeslot and eleventh for the night, behind A.P. Bio, For the People, Gotham, The Orville, Will & Grace, Law & Order: Special Victims Unit, Superstore, Station 19, the 2019 NCAA Division I men's basketball tournament and Grey's Anatomy.

With DVR factored in, the episode was watched by 3.00 million viewers.

=== Critical reviews ===
"The Therapist" received generally mixed-to-positive reviews from critics. LaToya Ferguson of The A.V. Club gave the episode a "B−" rating, writing, "I often feel like Brooklyn Nine-Nine is missing a certain something — not just a third plot — when it goes that route. Where we agree is that this episode seems to 'pay lip service' to the fact that Peralta has a lot of trauma to process — like the prison arc, which this episode mentions — so that it can move on and finally check that dangling aspect of the show off the list. Now Jake will be "fixed," so the idea that Jake very much needs therapy won't keep coming up."

Alan Sepinwall of Rolling Stone wrote, "Had 'The Therapist' done without, say, the Terry/Amy subplot, maybe that climactic scene with Jake stalling Tate by playing patient might have given his problems genuine weight. Instead, it becomes another story that's neither fish nor fowl, teasing at serious issues just enough to get in the way of the humor, but not enough to offer major insight into our main character." Nick Harley of Den of Geek gave the episode a 3.5 out of 5 star rating and wrote, "While overall not a disappointing outing, the episode disappoints more in what it didn't have time to do rather than what it actually did. Brooklyn Nine-Nine will be off a couple of weeks before returning in April. Hopefully when it shows back up, it will stick to the two-plot method instead of three."
