= The Bimbo =

- Brooklyn Nine-Nine episode
- Episode no.: Season 6 Episode 13
- Directed by: Joe Lo Truglio
- Written by: Paul Welsh & Madeline Walter
- Cinematography by: Rick Page
- Editing by: Jason Gill
- Production code: 613
- Original air date: April 18, 2019
- Running time: 21 minutes

Guest appearances
- Marc Evan Jackson as Kevin Cozner; Oliver Muirhead as Dean Wesley Allister; Bob Stephenson as Janitor Randy; Drew Tarver as Gary Jennings; Sarah Claspell as Officer Heather; Brandon Raman as Caleb

Episode chronology
← Previous "Casecation"	Next → "Ticking Clocks"
- Brooklyn Nine-Nine season 6

"The Bimbo" is the thirteenth episode of the sixth season of the American television police sitcom series Brooklyn Nine-Nine, and the 125th overall episode of the series. The episode was written by Patrick Welsh and Madeline Walter and directed by cast member Joe Lo Truglio in his directorial debut. It aired on April 18, 2019, on NBC.

The show revolves around the fictitious 99th precinct of the New York Police Department in Brooklyn and the officers and detectives that work in the precinct. In this episode, Jake and Holt investigate a burglary at Kevin's university, where Holt faces embarrassment due to an incident at a previous party. Meanwhile, Terry and Amy work to raise the squad's morale by taking them to lunch but each one has their method and both compete to see who has the best lunches.

According to Nielsen Media Research, the episode was seen by an estimated 1.78 million household viewers and gained a 0.5/3 ratings share among adults aged 18–49. The episode received very positive reviews from critics, who praised Joe Lo Truglio's directing and Andre Braugher's performance, although the subplot received more criticism.

== Plot ==
In the cold open, Holt punishes Jake for being late to another meeting by developing personalized handshakes with everyone in the room.

Kevin (Marc Evan Jackson) approaches Jake (Andy Samberg) for help in investigating a burglary at Columbia University where someone stole valuable coins from its classics department. However, he asks him not to tell Holt (Andre Braugher) about it for some undisclosed reason. While at the university, Holt arrives and Kevin is forced to confess his association with Jake. He reveals he didn't want him involved due to a previous incident where Holt misremembered a detail at a party and the Dean's (Oliver Muirhead) correction caused him to have a mental breakdown.

Jake and Holt investigate the university and Holt is further humiliated when the Dean says the janitor (Bob Stephenson) found the coins at a professor's desk, potentially ending the investigation. Not willing to backtrack, they continue investigating and find enough evidence to suggest that the Dean himself is the culprit for his footprints. They confront him but the Dean has an alibi as everyone at the party got the same shoes, except for Kevin and Holt. Holt feels lost but Jake reassures him that it is best not to be underestimated. This prompts him to finally solve the case and find that the janitor is the real thief. The Dean still mocks Holt, but Kevin defends Holt, citing that he is far more intelligent than anyone else.

Meanwhile, due to the refrigerator being out of service, Terry (Terry Crews) and Amy (Melissa Fumero) try to raise the squad's morale by taking them to multiple lunchtime activities, with half of the bullpen going with each one. What started as simple paid lunches soon turns into overly complicated activities that everyone eventually has enough of and tries to avoid. After thoughtful consideration, they find their best solution: making the conference room an official lunch room where everyone can use their phones without seeing anyone else.

== Reception ==
=== Viewers ===
According to Nielsen Media Research, the episode was seen by an estimated 1.78 million household viewers and gained a 0.5/3 ratings share among adults aged 18–49. This means that 0.5 percent of all households with televisions watched the episode, while 3 percent of all households watching television at that time watched it. This was a slight decrease over the previous episode, which was watched by 1.88 million viewers and a 0.6/3 ratings share. With these ratings, Brooklyn Nine-Nine was the fourth highest rated show on NBC for the night behind A.P. Bio, a Law & Order: Special Victims Unit rerun and Superstore, fifth on its timeslot and fourteenth for the night, behind A.P. Bio, a Law & Order: Special Victims Unit rerun, For the People, Gotham, The Orville, Station 19, two Life in Pieces episodes, S.W.A.T., Superstore, Mom, Grey's Anatomy, and The Big Bang Theory.

With DVR factored in, the episode was watched by 2.70 million viewers.

=== Critical reviews ===
"The Bimbo" received very positive reviews from critics. LaToya Ferguson of The A.V. Club gave the episode an "A" rating, writing, "As this season of Brooklyn Nine-Nine references its past more than any previous season, even better than hearing these references is seeing how these past issues have affected these characters."

Alan Sepinwall of Rolling Stone wrote, "The Jake/Holt role reversal, and the latest opportunity to spend more time around Holt and Kevin, was so strong, I wouldn't have minded giving the rest of the supporting cast the week off." Nick Harley of Den of Geek gave it a 3.5 star rating out of 5 and wrote, "This is a pretty lightweight episode, but I enjoyed it mainly because I always find the glimpses into Holt's personal life, and his relationship with Kevin, to be illuminating and the perfect use of Jake's straight-man talents. 'The Bimbo' probably won't go down as anyone's favorite episode, but it serves up the right number of laughs and adds new understanding to Holt, so it still qualifies as a successful installment."
