= Chelsea Peretti =

American comedian and actress (born 1978)

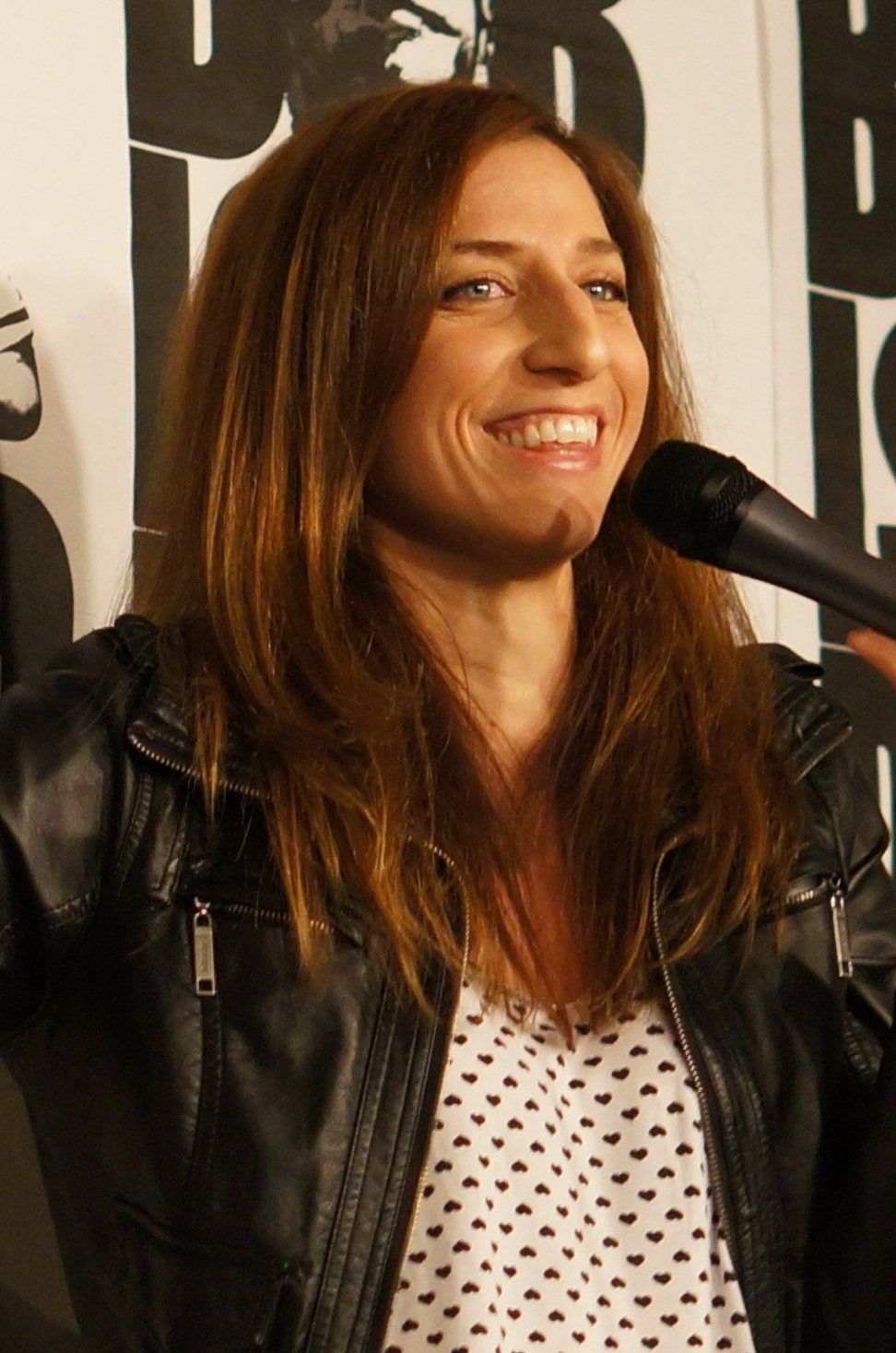
- Peretti in 2013
- Born: February 20, 1978 (age 48); Oakland, California, U.S.
- Education: Barnard College
- Spouse: Jordan Peele (m. 2016)
- Children: 1
- Relatives: Jonah Peretti (brother)

Comedy career
- Years active: 1998–present
- Medium: Stand-up; television; film; music
- Website: chelseaperetti.com

Chelsea Peretti (born February 20, 1978) is an American comedian, actress, and writer. She portrayed Gina Linetti in the comedy series Brooklyn Nine-Nine and has written for various TV series, including Parks and Recreation, Saturday Night Live and Kroll Show.

== Early life and education ==
Peretti was born on February 20, 1978, in Oakland, California, to Amanda Cherkin, a schoolteacher, and Gene Peretti, a criminal defense lawyer and painter. Her father is of Italian and English descent, and her mother is Jewish. Her step-mother was African-American. She was raised in Oakland. She has an older brother, internet entrepreneur Jonah Peretti, co-founder of BuzzFeed and The Huffington Post. Chelsea Peretti attended The College Preparatory School in Oakland. She moved to New York City in 1996 to attend Barnard College, during which time (in her junior year) she took a study year abroad to Royal Holloway, University of London. She graduated in 2000. She attended elementary school with her Brooklyn Nine-Nine co-star Andy Samberg and junior high school with comedian Moshe Kasher.

== Career ==
=== Writing ===
Peretti has written for The Village Voice, Details, Playgirl, Jest, and American Theatre Magazine, as well as online publications including The Huffington Post.

=== Television ===
After moving to Los Angeles, Peretti made appearances on programs such as Kroll Show, Louie, The Sarah Silverman Program, World's Dumbest..., and Tosh.0. She appeared as a guest correspondent on one episode of Lopez Tonight, interviewing local citizens about Prop 8.

Peretti is credited as a story editor on the fourth season of Parks and Recreation from 2011 to 2012.

From 2013 until 2019, Peretti was a series regular on NBC's detective/police comedy Brooklyn Nine-Nine, playing Gina Linetti, until she announced her departure from the show in October 2018. Her departure episode was "Four Movements." She returned later in the season in a guest appearance, in "Return of the King," which premiered May 2, 2019. She also returned for the two-part finale.

=== In other media ===
While in New York, Peretti made short films with Variety SHAC, a comedy troupe she formed in 2004 with Andrea Rosen, Heather Lawless, and Shonali Bhowmik.

She has also made several guest appearances on podcasts, including Doug Loves Movies, How Did This Get Made?, WTF with Marc Maron, You Made It Weird with Pete Holmes, The Todd Glass Show, The Lavender Hour, The Bone Zone with Brendon Walsh and Randy Liedtke, and Comedy Bang! Bang! In October 2012, Peretti launched her own call-in podcast, Call Chelsea Peretti.

In July 2010, Peretti made Variety magazine's "Ten Comics to Watch in 2010" list. Paste ranked her Twitter account #75 on "The 75 Best Twitter Accounts of 2014."

On April 21, 2020, Peretti released an EP titled Foam and Flotsam, a musical comedy concept album about coffee. She created the music in collaboration with Kool Kojak, and the songs feature guests Reggie Watts, Terry Crews, and Juliette Lewis. In tandem with the EP, Peretti also released two accompanying music videos: "Late" and "Oatmilk." Her music style is described as "whimsical yet depressive...[slamming] you into a wall and then [sliding] you up that wall and [releasing] you into a new galaxy."

== Personal life ==
Peretti began dating comedian and filmmaker Jordan Peele in 2013. They got engaged in November 2015. On April 26, 2016, Peretti announced that she and Peele had eloped. They have a son who was born on July 1, 2017.

== Filmography ==
=== Film ===
Year	Title	Role	Notes
2007	Twisted Fortune	Rachel	
2011	Guy Talk	Girl	
2016	Popstar: Never Stop Never Stopping	Brunette CMZ Reporter	
2018	Game Night	Glenda	
2019	Spinster	Gaby	
2020	The Photograph	Sara Rodgers	
2020	Friendsgiving	Claire	
2021	Sing 2	Suki Lane	Voice
2023	Cora Bora	Laurie	
2023	First Time Female Director	Sam Clifford	Also director, writer, and producer
TBA	Cut Off	TBA	Post-production

=== Television ===
Year	Show	Role	Notes
2004	Comedy Lab	Eugene's Friend	Episode: "12:21"
2006	Cheap Seats	Shonda	Episode: "Evel Kneival"
2008–2013	World's Dumbest...	Herself	88 episodes
2009	Bobby Bottleservice		Writer; Episode: "T-Shirt Ideas for Jersey Shore"
2010	Louie	Date	Episode: "Pilot"
2010	The Sarah Silverman Program	Becky	Writer; Episode: "Smellin' of Troy"
2010	WTF with Marc Maron		Writer; TV movie Brooklyn 99
2011	Comedy Central Presents	Herself	Writer; Episode: "Chelsea Peretti"
2011–2012	Parks and Recreation	Zelda	Episode: "Live Ammo"; Writer (2 episodes); Story editor (season 4)
2011–2013	China, IL	Crystal Peppers / Kim Buckett	Voice, 14 episodes
2011–2013	Funny as Hell		Writer; 2 episodes
2012	The Couple	Gigi	2 episodes
2012	Hell's Kitchen	Herself	Season 10, Episode 14
2013	The Greatest Event in Television History	Jackie Rush	Episode: "Too Close for Comfort"
2013	High School USA!	Superintendent Andrea Kunssler	Voice, episode: "Janitor Day"
2013	Saturday Night Live		Writer; 2 episodes
2013–2015	Comedy Bang! Bang!	Delivery Woman / Trey Booth	2 episodes
2013–2015	Kroll Show	Herself / Various Characters	9 episodes Writer (8 episodes); Producer (8 episodes)
2013–2021	Brooklyn Nine-Nine	Gina Linetti	Main role (seasons 1–6), guest role (season 8); 108 episodes
2014	Key & Peele	Art Show Presenter	Episode: "Dicknanigans"
2015	Gravity Falls	Darlene	Voice, episode: "Roadside Attraction"
2015	Drunk History	Ann Druyan	Episode: "Space"
2015–2016	The Big Fat Quiz of Everything	Herself	2 episodes
2016	Animals	Angela	Voice, episode: "Dogs."
2016	New Girl	Gina Linetti	Episode: "Homecoming"
2016	RuPaul's Drag Race All Stars	Herself	Episode: "Revenge of the Queens"
2016	HarmonQuest	Deepak Chopra	Episode: "The Stone Saw Mines"
2016–2018	Future-Worm!	Ennuisha / Mean Little Girl	Voice, 3 episodes
2017	Girls	Chelsea	Episode: "All I Ever Wanted"
2017	Adventure Time	Queen of Ooo	Voice, episode: "Fionna and Cake and Fionna"
2017–2025	Big Mouth	Monica Foreman-Greenwald / Cellsea	Voice, 22 episodes
2018	Alone Together	Tamra	Episode: "Pop-Up"
2018	Another Period	Reporter	Episode: "Sex Nickelodeon"
2018	Inside Jokes	Herself	4 episodes
2018–2019	American Dad!	Dorothy / Angie	Voice, 2 episodes
2019–2020	The Simpsons	Piper / Lauren	Voice, 2 episodes
2019–2020	Harvey Girls Forever	Maria	Voice, 5 episodes
2019–2021	Crank Yankers	Herself	Voice, 2 episodes
2020	Search Party	Patsy Monahan	Episode: "The Whistleblower"
2021–2023	The Great North	Lara Silverblatt / Abigail	Voice, 4 episodes
2022	Nailed It!	Herself	Episode: "Slime Time"
2022–2024	Bob's Burgers	Eleanor / Chelsea	Voice, 4 episodes
2023	My Dad the Bounty Hunter	Pam	Voice
2023–Present	Adventure Time: Fionna and Cake	Queenie	Voice, recurring
2024	Krapopolis	Additional Voices	Voice, episode: "A Krapwork Orange"
2024	Yo Gabba Gabbaland	Herself	Episode: Silly
2025	Am I Being Unreasonable?	Savannah	2 episodes
2026	Very Important People	Jane	1 episode

=== Web ===
Year	Title	Credit	Role	Notes
2009	Chelsea Peretti's All My Exes	Creator	Herself	6 episodes
2014	Chelsea Peretti: One of the Greats	Writer, executive producer	Herself	Netflix special
2025	Tab Time	Actress	Space Casey	1 episode

=== Video games ===
Year	Title	Role	Notes
2008	Grand Theft Auto IV	Lori Williams-Jones	Voice

== Discography ==
=== Studio albums ===
- TBA

=== Extended plays ===
Title	Details
Foam and Flotsam	Released: April 21, 2020; Labels: Self-released; Formats: Digital download, streaming
Phosphorescent Panic	Released: August 11, 2020; Labels: Self-released; Formats: Digital download, streaming

== Awards and nominations ==
Award	Year	Category	Nominated work	Result	Ref.
American Comedy Awards	2014	Best Comedy Supporting Actress – TV	Brooklyn Nine-Nine	Nominated	
Screen Actors Guild Awards	2015	Outstanding Performance by an Ensemble in a Comedy Series	Brooklyn Nine-Nine	Nominated	
Webby Awards	2015	Outstanding Comedic Performance	Chelsea Peretti: One of the Greats	Won	
Writers Guild of America Awards	2012	Television: Comedy Series	Parks and Recreation	Nominated	
Writers Guild of America Awards	2013	Television: Comedy Series	Parks and Recreation	Nominated	
