= Oliver Muirhead =

English character actor (born 1957)

- Born: 29 May 1957 (age 69); London, England
- Occupation: Actor
- Years active: 1974–present

Oliver Muirhead (born 29 May 1957) is an English character actor, known for often portraying pompous country gentlemen. In 1986, he also directed the musical pantomime A Christmas Held Captive. In addition to acting, Muirhead has also lent his voice to various animated series such as P.J. Sparkles and Spider-Man: The Animated Series and the video games Zork: Grand Inquisitor, Dead to Rights, The Hobbit and Eragon.

He is known in the United States for his appearances in 1990s commercials for Tombstone Pizza. He also had a memorable cameo as a sarcastic jeweller in the Friends episode "The One with the Ring".

In 1991, he starred in the soap opera Santa Barbara as Mr. Marx: he hired Gina at the Santa Barbara Sperm Bank.

== Filmography ==
Film
Year	Title	Role	Notes
1989	She's Out of Control	Nigel	
1993	Ghost Brigade	Richard Bradley	Alternative title: The Killing Box and Grey Knight
1996	Spider-Man: Sins of the Fathers	The Spot (Voice)	Direct-to-video release
1997	Swimsuit: The Movie	Jeremy Hollister	
1999	The Duke	Cecil Cavendish	
1999	Austin Powers: The Spy Who Shagged Me	British Colonel	
2000	MVP: Most Valuable Primate	Dr. Peabody	
2002	Man of the Year	Reg	
2005	Fun with Dick and Jane	Account Rep, Grand Cayman Bank	Alternative title: Alternative Career
2006	Garfield: A Tail of Two Kitties	Mr. Greene	Alternative title: Garfield 2
2007	Alvin and the Chipmunks	Butler	
2007	National Treasure: Book of Secrets	Control Room Guard	
2008	An American Carol	Neville Chamberlain	
2008	Super Capers	Herbert Q	
2008	Son of Mourning	JBS News Anchor	
2010	The Social Network	Mr. Kenwright	
2011	Like Crazy	Bernard	
2012	The Beauty Inside	Alex #23	
TBA	You Above All		Filming

Television
Year	Title	Role	Notes
1987	Young Harry Houdini	Bobby	Television film
1989	Tarzan in Manhattan		Television film
1989	Jake and the Fatman	Mr. Pruitt	Episode: "My Shining Hour"
1990–1991	Who's the Boss?	Maitre d' Oliver	2 episodes
1991	Santa Barbara	Mr. Marx	7 episodes
1992–1993	The Legend of Prince Valiant	King Forsythe/Blake of Haven (voice)	2 episodes
1993	Living Single	Waiter	Episode: "Whose Date Is It Anyway?"
1994	Getting By	Niles	Episode: "A Life in the Theater"
1994	Married... with Children	Mr. Blithers	Episode: "Driving Mr. Boondy"
1995	Kirk	Mr. Chumwell	Episode: "Welcome to New York"
1995–1996	Lois & Clark: The New Adventures of Superman	Mr. Sunshine; Manager	2 episodes
1996	Maybe This Time	Mr. Nichols	Episode: "Acting Out"
1996–1997	Spider-Man: The Animated Series	The Spot, Abraham Whistler	Voice, 4 episodes
1996–1998	All That	Health Inspector/Mr. Thezby	2 episodes
1997	Meego	Mr. McQuidy	Episode: "Fatal Attraction"
1997–1998	Unhappily Ever After	Mr. Monteleone	6 episodes
1998	Suddenly Susan	Dr. Hale	Episode: "Poetry in Notion"
1998	Seinfeld	Lubeck	Episode: "The Frogger"
1999	Kenan & Kel	Waiter/Gavin	Episode: "Freezer Burned"
2000	The Beach Boys: An American Family	TV Host	Television film
2000	Friends	The Jeweler	Episode: "The One With the Ring"
2001–2002	Buffy the Vampire Slayer	Phillip	2 episodes
2003	The Parkers	Ben	Episode: "Out with the Old, in with the New"
2003	Will & Grace	Walter	Episode: "Strangers With Candic"
2003	Joan of Arcadia	Proctor God	Episode: "Drive, He Said"
2004	Yes, Dear	Coleman	Episode: "Living with Mr. Savitsky"
2005	Las Vegas	Valet	Episode: "Hide and Sneak"
2006	Lost	Monsignor	Episode: "?"
2006	Gilmore Girls	Arthur Gordon	Episode: "Bridesmaids Revisited"
2007	The Suite Life of Zack & Cody	Mr. Duatch	Episode: "A Nugget of History"
2007	Notes from the Underbelly	Dr. Bob Jennings	Episode: "Julie and Eric's Baby"
2008	iCarly	Harry Joyner	Episode: "iHeart Art"
2009	Bones	Badgley Mormont	Episode: "The Princess and the Pear"
2009	The Big Bang Theory	Dr. Laughlin	Episode: "The Pirate Solution"
2009	NCIS	Jay Danorth	Episode: "Reunion"
2010	True Jackson, VP	Ian the butler	Episode: "True Royal"
2010–2016	Castle	Steven Heisler; Bryce Robert	2 episodes
2011	Pair of Kings	King of the island Cornea	Episode: "Kings and an Eye"
2011	The Secret Life of the American Teenager	Richard Malkovich	Episode: "Deeper and Deeper"
2011	Switched at Birth	Hair Salon owner	3 episodes
2012	Mr. Box Office	Mr. Hennessey	Episode: "Money, Money, Money"
2013	Psych	Julian Drake	Episode: "Santabarbaratown 2"
2013	Mad Men	John Echolls	Episode: "Collaborators"
2013	Jessie	Nigel Pettigrew	Episode: "We Don't Need No Stinkin' Badges"
2014–2015	Mighty Med	Ambrose	2 episodes
2016	2 Broke Girls	Dr. Gomulka	Episode: "And the Two Openings"
2017	General Hospital	Lord Larry Ashton	6 episodes
2019	Brooklyn Nine-Nine	Dean Wesley Allister	Episode: "The Bimbo"
2019	The Good Place	Professor Stjepan Radja	Episode: "The Answer"
2019	Fuller House	Monsieur Guy	Episode: "Hale's Kitchen"
2021	CSI: Vegas	Gary Snyder	Episode: "Waiting in the Wings"
2023	Young Sheldon	Dr. Van Doornewaard	Episode: "A Tornado, a 10-Hour Flight and a Darn Fine Ring"
2025	9-1-1: Lone Star	Dr. Keith Chalmers	Episode: "Homecoming"

Video games
Year	Title	Role	Notes
2002	Dead to Rights	Patch, Marvin Silt, Gofer	
