= Antonio Raul Corbo =

American actor (born 2009)

- Born: June 4, 2009 (age 17)
- Occupation: Actor
- Years active: 2016–present
- Known for: Nikolaj Boyle (Brooklyn Nine-Nine)

Antonio Raul Corbo (born June 4, 2009) is an American actor known for his role as Nikolaj Boyle in the series Brooklyn Nine-Nine.

== Biography ==
Corbo began his acting career in Austin, Texas at the age of 5. He auditioned and made several national commercials.

In 2016, at seven years old, he began his acting career in Los Angeles obtaining his most recognized role in the series Brooklyn Nine-Nine as Nikolaj Boyle; adoptive son of Charles Boyle and Genevieve Mirren-Carter. That same year, he appeared on New Girl as the same character.

His first appearance in Brooklyn Nine-Nine was in 2016 in the chapter called "The Night Shift" belonging to the fourth season. His latest appearance in the series was in 2020, in the episode "Ding Dong", belonging to the show's seventh season.

In 2020, he appeared as Sammy in the CBS series Broke.

== Filmography ==
=== Television ===
Year	Title	Character	Notes
2016	New Girl	Nikolaj Boyle	Episode: "Homecoming"
2016–2020	Brooklyn Nine-Nine	Nikolaj Boyle	6 episodes
2018	The Guest Book	Sam	Episode: "Tonight, You Become a Man"
2018	Teachers	Benji	Episode: "For Poorer or Poorer"
2018	Stuck in the Middle	Hunter	Episode: "Stuck in Camp Chaos"
2018	Great News	Young Chuck	Episode: "Early Retirment"
2018	Alone Together	Bobby	Episode: "Fertility"
2018	Alexa & Katie	Student #5	Episode: "Winter Luau"
2018–2019	We Bare Bears	Additional voices	3 episodes
2019	The Rocketeer	Ben	Recurring role
2019	Into the Dark	Tate	Episode: "Pilgrim"
2020	Infinity Train	Apex Member	Voice, 2 episodes
2020	Broke	Sammy	Main role
2020–2023	Summer Camp Island	Oscar Peltzer	Voice, main role (seasons 3–6)
2023–2024	Princess Power	Felipe, Royal Attendant	Voice, 2 episodes

=== Film ===
Year	Title	Character	Notes
2018	Mary Poppins Returns	Boy	
2018	City of Lies	Young Russell Polle Jr.	
2019	The Secret Life of Pets 2	Additional voices	
2019	Frozen 2	Additional voices	
2020	The SpongeBob Movie: Sponge on the Run	Young SpongeBob SquarePants	Voice
2024	The Life of Chuck	Brian Krantz	
