= Stephanie Beatriz =

Argentinian-born American actress and singer (born 1981)

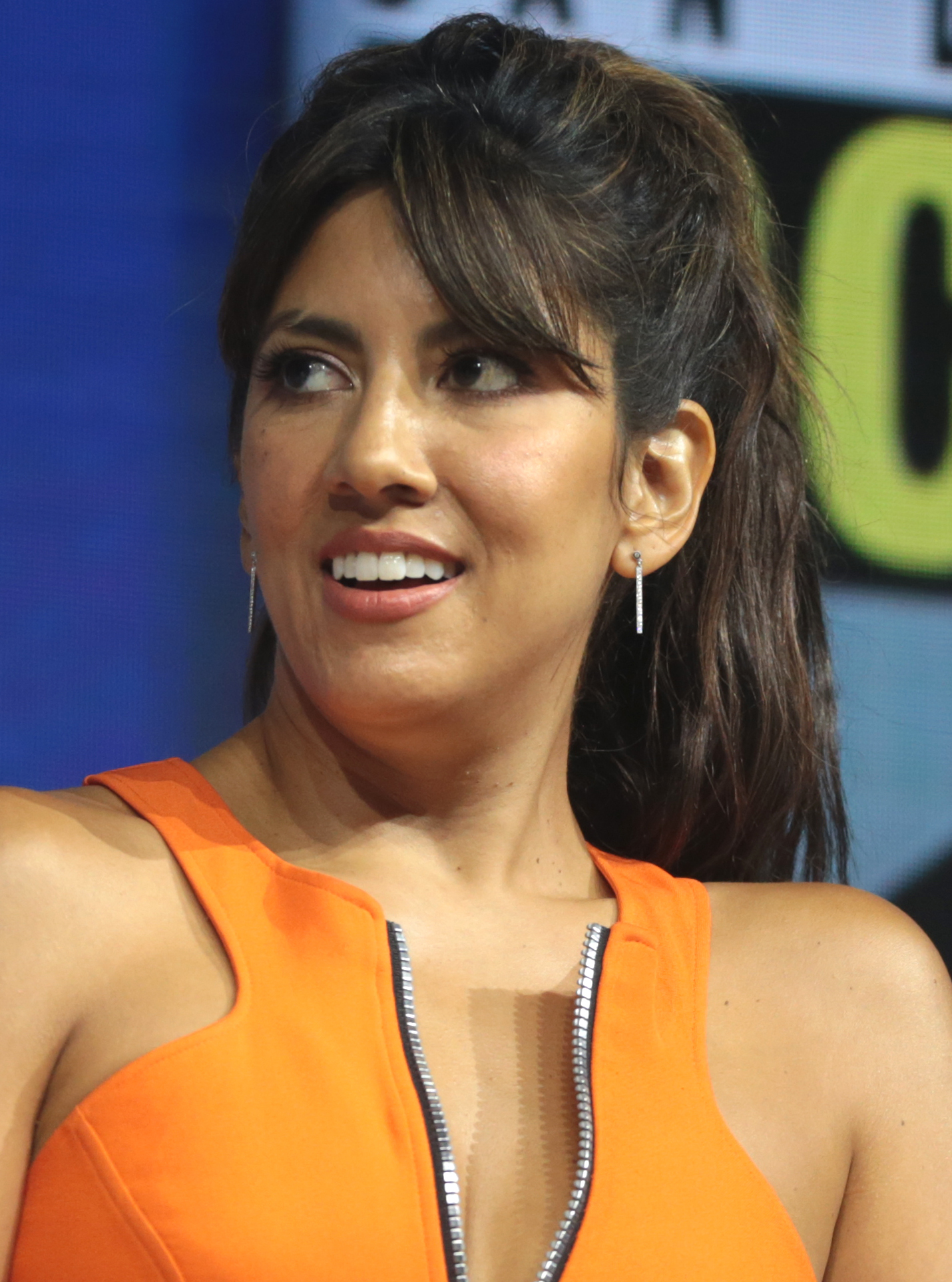
- Beatriz at the 2018 San Diego Comic Con
- Born: Stephanie Beatriz Bischoff Alvizuri; February 10, 1981 (age 45); Neuquén, Argentina
- Citizenship: United States; Argentina; Bolivia (Note: Beatriz has triple citizenship: American (by residence), Argentine(by birth) and Bolivian (by ius sanguinis).)
- Education: Stephens College (BFA)
- Occupations: Actress; singer; voice actor
- Years active: 2002–present
- Spouse: Brad Hoss (m. 2018)
- Children: 1

Stephanie Beatriz Bischoff Alvizuri (born February 10, 1981) is an Argentinian-born American actress and singer. She is best known for playing Detective Rosa Diaz in the Fox/NBC comedy series Brooklyn Nine-Nine (2013–2021) and Quiet in the Peacock action-comedy series Twisted Metal (2023–present).

She also portrayed Carla in the musical film In the Heights (2021), and provided the voices for Mirabel Madrigal in the Disney animated film Encanto (2021) and Vaggie / Vaggi in the adult animated musical series Hazbin Hotel (2024–present).

== Early life and education ==
Stephanie Beatriz Bischoff Alvizuri was born in Neuquén, Argentina, on February 10, 1981, to a Colombian father and a Bolivian mother. She moved to the United States at the age of two with her parents and a younger sister. Beatriz grew up in Webster, Texas, outside of Houston, and attended Clear Brook High School. As a child, her mother took Beatriz and her sister to arts exhibits and events, something she credits for raising her awareness of potential careers in the arts. She became interested in acting after taking speech and debate as an elective, which allowed her to appear in plays. She became a United States citizen at 18.

Beatriz attended the all-women's Stephens College in Columbia, Missouri. After graduating in 2002, she moved to New York City to pursue acting.

== Career ==
=== 2002–2013: Early Work and breakthrough ===
Beatriz performed for three seasons at Oregon Shakespeare Festival, including roles such as Catherine in A View From a Bridge in 2008, Maggie in Cat on a Hot Tin Roof in 2010, and Isabella in Measure for Measure in 2011.

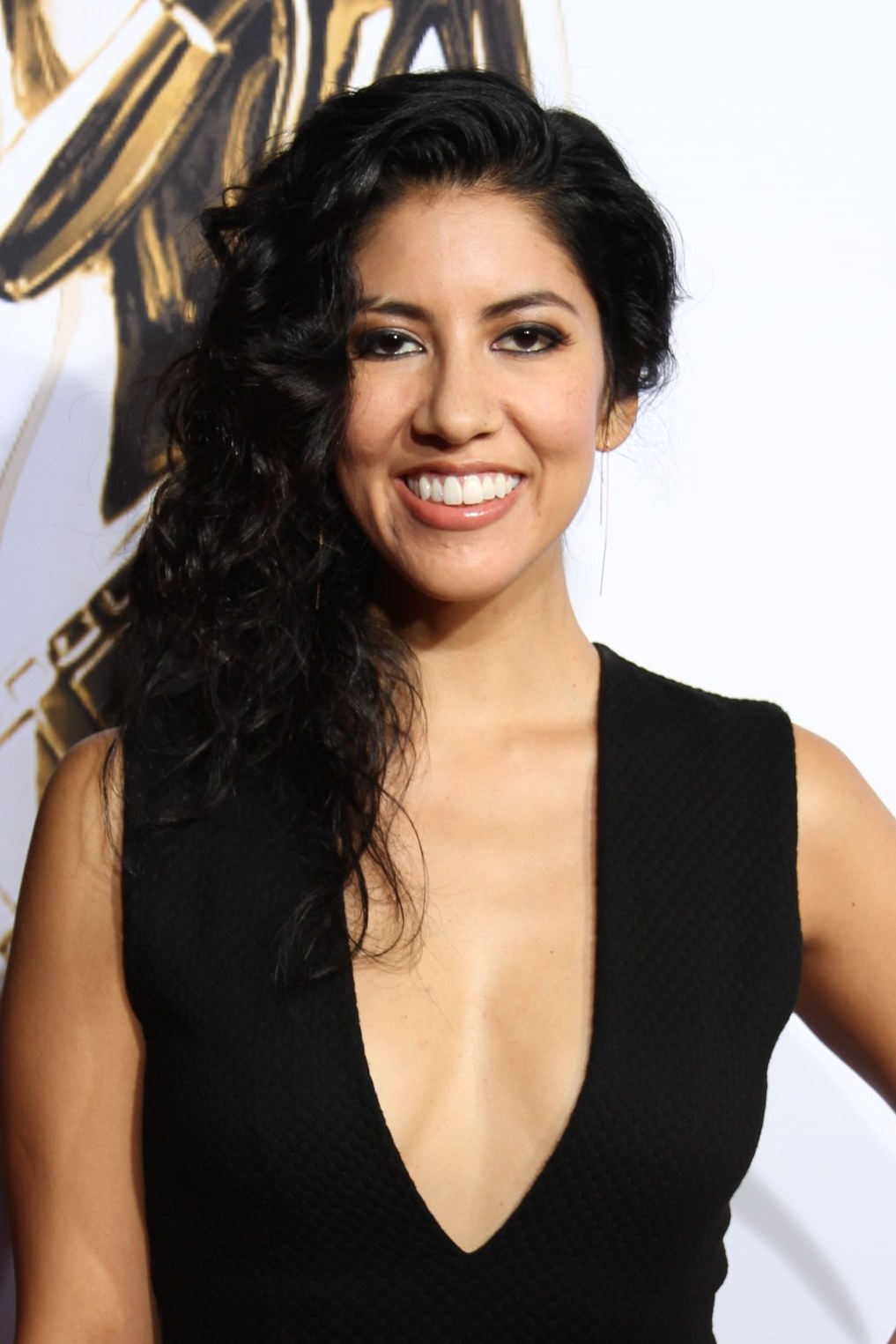
Beatriz in 2014

Beatriz had minor roles in the police procedural television series The Closer and Southland, and a recurring role as Gloria's sister Sonia Ramirez in the ABC comedy series Modern Family.

In 2013, she began portraying Detective Rosa Diaz in the Fox and NBC series Brooklyn Nine-Nine, an action comedy series based around the members of a Brooklyn police precinct. In 2019, she directed the season 6 episode "He Said, She Said". The show ran for eight seasons.

=== 2014–present: Blockbusters + Animated Television and film work ===
Beatriz starred as Bonnie in the independent feature film The Light of the Moon, written and directed by Jessica M. Thompson. The film premiered at the 2017 South by Southwest Film Festival, where it won the Audience Award for Narrative Feature Competition. She received highly positive reviews for her performance, with The Hollywood Reporter stating that "Beatriz offers a powerful ... unflinching, authentic performance," while Variety noted that the film was "harrowingly effective" and Beatriz's performance was "expertly balanced and judged." From 2018 to 2019, she voiced the character Gina Cazador on BoJack Horseman. She was also the voice of General Sweet Mayhem in The Lego Movie 2: The Second Part.

It was announced in 2019 she would be appearing in the 2021 film adaptation of Lin-Manuel Miranda's Tony Award-winning musical In the Heights. She also voiced Mirabel Madrigal, the main character in the Disney animated film Encanto, making it her second collaboration with Miranda of the year.

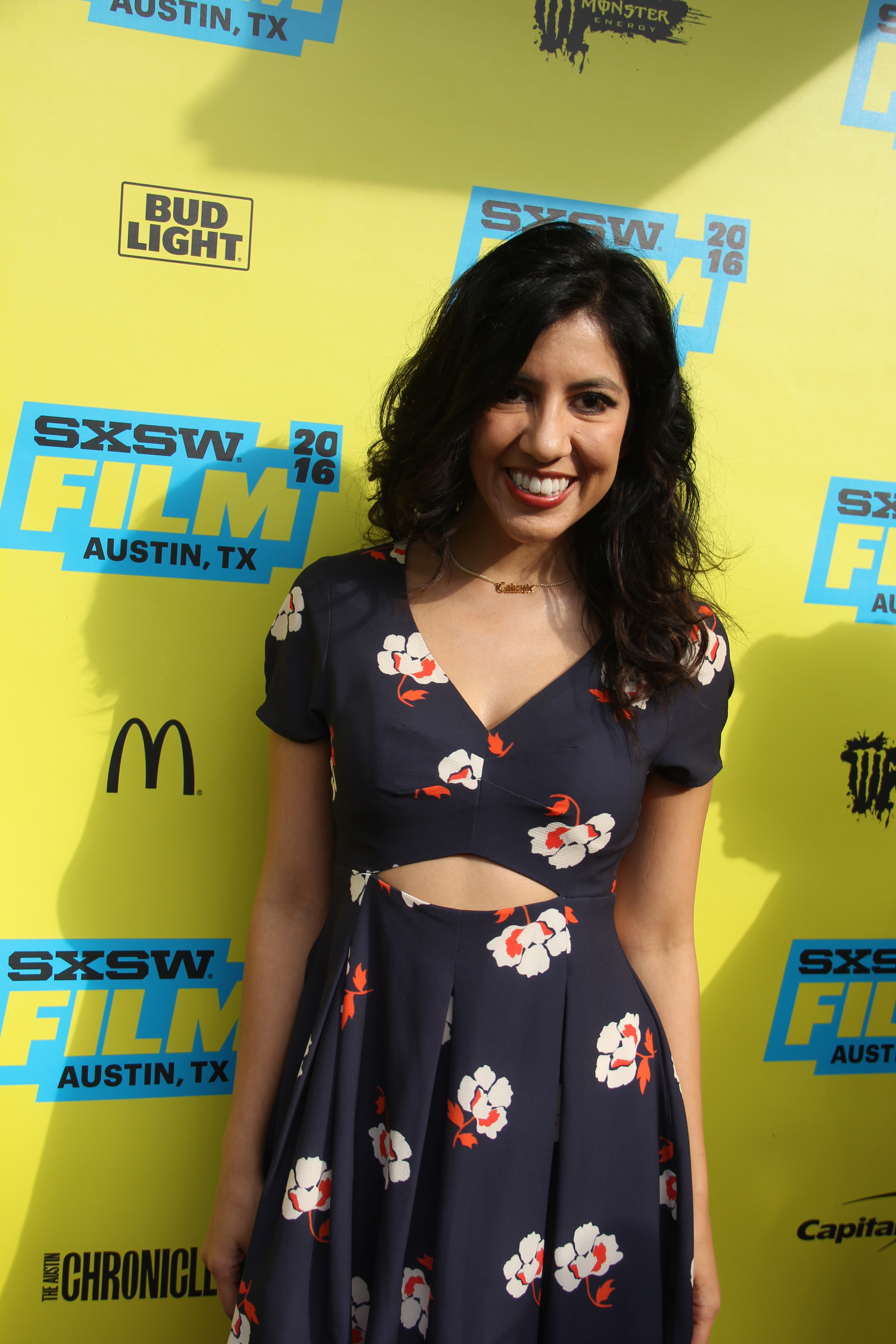
Beatriz in 2016

In 2019, Beatriz and her Brooklyn Nine-Nine co-star Melissa Fumero were the masters of ceremonies at the National Hispanic Media Coalition Impact Awards.

In 2021, Beatriz voiced the lead role in the Texas Rangers-centered crime procedural podcast Tejana. The same year it was announced she voiced Ruby Ortiz in Alpha Betas. She also serves as an executive producer for Tejana and, as of November 2021, was looking to develop a television series based on the characters. She also starred in the sci-fi thriller podcast Solar and hosted Wondery's Twin Flames podcast investigating the dating cult Twin Flames Universe. Since 2024, Beatriz has voiced the character Vaggie / Vaggi in Hazbin Hotel. Also in 2024, Beatriz played the supporting role of Barbara in the sex comedy Doin' It.

== Personal life ==
Beatriz has severe astigmatism and requires glasses to see clearly. She does not wear them in many of her roles, and her eyes are sensitive to contact lenses; she therefore has difficulty hitting her marks while on camera.

She has described herself as suffering from disordered eating, which she developed during college.

Beatriz first realized that she was bisexual around age 12 or 13. She experienced biphobia and bisexual erasure from family and friends. In June 2016, she officially came out to the public.

In October 2017, she announced her engagement to Brad Hoss. They got married on October 6, 2018. In June 2021, she announced her pregnancy, and her daughter was born in August 2021.

== Filmography ==
Key
†	Denotes works that have not yet been released

=== Film ===
Year	Title	Role	Notes
2013	Short Term 12	Jessica	
2014	You're Not You	Jill	
2016	Pee-wee's Big Holiday	Freckles	
2016	Ice Age: Collision Course	Gertie (voice)	
2016	The Pistol Shrimps	Herself	Member of the L.A. City Municipal Dance Squad
2017	The Light of the Moon	Bonnie	Also executive producer
2018	Half Magic	Candy	
2019	The Lego Movie 2: The Second Part	General Sweet Mayhem (voice)	
2021	In the Heights	Carla	
2021	Encanto	Mirabel Madrigal (voice)	
2022	Catwoman: Hunted	Batwoman (voice)	
2022	The Bob's Burgers Movie	Chloe Barbash (voice)	
2023	Reverse the Curse	Mariana	
2023	First Time Female Director	Lisa	
2024	Doin' It	Barbara	
2025	Zootopia 2	Bloats (voice)	Cameo
2026	Don't Say Good Luck	Ms. Parker	

=== Television ===
Year	Title	Role	Notes
2009	The Closer	Camila Santiago	Episode: "The Life"
2012	The Smart One	Natalee	Television film
2013	Southland	Belinda Cargrove	Episode: "Under the Big Top"
2013	Jessie	Salma Espinosa	Episode: "Toy Con"
2013	Hello Ladies	Gatekeeper	Episode: "The Limo"
2013–2019	Modern Family	Sonia Ramirez	4 episodes
2013–2021	Brooklyn Nine-Nine	Rosa Diaz	Main role; 151 episodes, directed the episode "He Said, She Said"
2014	Top Chef Duels	Herself	Episode: "Jen Carroll vs. Nyesha Arrington"
2015	Axe Cop	Hasta Mia (voice)	Episode: "The Center of the Ocean"
2017	The New V.I.P.'s	Elena (voice)	Television film
2017	Danger & Eggs	Sheriff Luke, Captain Banjo	Voice, 4 episodes
2017	@midnight	Herself	Episode: "541"
2017–2022	Bob's Burgers	Chloe Barbash, Julia, Pam, Rachel	Voice, 7 episodes
2018	Hell's Kitchen	Herself (Diner)	Episode: "Fish Out of Water"
2018–2019	BoJack Horseman	Gina Cazador	Voice, 9 episodes
2019	One Day at a Time	Pilar	Episode: "The Funeral"
2019	Into the Dark	Elena	Episode: "Treehouse"
2019	The Unauthorized Bash Brothers Experience	Val Gal	Variety special
2019	Twelve Forever	Conelly	Voice, 2 episodes
2020	Family Guy	Hostess	Voice, episode: "Holly Bibble"
2020	Elena of Avalor	Ixlan	Voice, 3 episodes
2020	Wizards: Tales of Arcadia	Callista, Nemue, Deya The Deliverer	Voice, 7 episodes
2020	Reno 911!	Sofia the Drug Lord	Episode: "Sofia the Drug Lord"
2020–2021	DuckTales	Gosalyn Waddlemeyer	Voice, 2 episodes
2020–2021	Central Park	Enrique	Voice, 2 episodes
2021	Jurassic World Camp Cretaceous	Tiff	Voice, 5 episodes
2021	Devil May Care	Head Demon Gloria	Voice, 7 episodes
2021	The Casagrandes	Blanca Guzman	Voice, episode: "Saving Face"
2021	Q-Force	Mira Popadopolous	Voice, main role
2021	American Dad!	Chardonnay	Voice, episode: "Family Time"
2021	Maya and the Three	Chimi	Voice, main role
2022	Robot Chicken	Alita, Maria Wong	Voice, episode: "May Cause an Excess of Ham"
2022	Dogs in Space	Pepper	Voice, main role (season 2)
2022–present	The Legend of Vox Machina	Lady Kima of Vord	Voice, recurring role
2023–2025	Big Mouth	Lulu	Voice, recurring role
2023–2025	Krapopolis	Daphne	Voice, recurring role
2023–present	Twisted Metal	Quiet	Main role, 22 episodes
2024	Hit-Monkey	Amara	Voice, guest role (season 2)
2024	Creature Commandos	Aisla MacPherson	Voice, episode: "Chapter Four: Chasing Squirrels"
2024	Creature Commandos	Clayface	Voice, episode: "Chapter Five: The Iron Pot"
2024–present	Hazbin Hotel	Vaggie / Vaggi	Voice, main role
2024–present	A Man on the Inside	Didi	Main role
2025	Digman!	Ximena	Voice, 2 episodes
2026	Golden Axe	Druda Hildegrande	Voice, 5 episodes
2026–present	President Curtis	Roe Banks	Voice, main role
TBA	North Woods †	Donalda	Voice, main role

=== Web ===
Year	Title	Role	Notes
2016	WIZARD	Elizabeth (voice)	3 episodes
2021–2022	Alpha Betas	Ruby Ortiz, Jane (voice)	5 episodes; recurring role
2025	Good Mythical Morning	Herself	1 episode

=== Podcasts ===
Year	Title	Role	Production company	Notes
2021	Tejana	Eileen Castillo	Sonoro Media/Telemundo	6 episodes; Executive producer
2021	Whistle Through the Shamrocks	Marilyn Bigfoot	Hat Trick Productions	6 episodes
2022	Twin Flames	host	Wondery	6 episodes
2022	Solar	Dr. Wren Guerrero	CurtCo Media	12 episodes
2022	Why Won't You Date Me?	guest	Team Coco	Episode: "Bisexual Erasure"
2024–2025	More Better with Stephanie and Melissa	Host	My Cultura and iHeartPodcasts	Co-hosted with Melissa Fumero

=== Theatre ===
Year	Title	Role	Notes
2005	Oh, What a Lovely War!	Performer	
2021–2022	2:22 A Ghost Story	Lauren	Gielgud Theatre

=== Video games ===
Year	Title	Voice role	Notes
2023	Disney Dreamlight Valley	Mirabel Madrigal	Added in a February 2023 update
2026	Disney Speedstorm	Mirabel Madrigal	Added in a Season 21 Update

=== Miscellaneous work ===
Year	Title	Role	Notes
2027	Antonio's Fiesta de Encanto	Mirabel Madrigal (voice)	Disney's Animal Kingdom attraction

== Discography ==
=== Charted songs ===
List of charted songs, with year released, selected chart positions, certifications, and album name shown
Title	Year	Peak chart positions										Certifications	Album
Title	Year	US	AUS	CAN	GER	IRE	NLD	NZ	SWE	UK	WW	Certifications	Album
"We Don't Talk About Bruno" (with Carolina Gaitán, Mauro Castillo, Adassa, Rhenzy Feliz, and Diane Guerrero)	2021	1	5	3	71	1	41	4	40	1	1	RIAA: 2× Platinum; ARIA: Platinum; BPI: 2× Platinum; MC: Gold	Encanto
"The Family Madrigal" (with Olga Merediz and Encanto cast)	2021	20	40	31	—	18	—	— (Note: "The Family Madrigal" did not enter the NZ Top 40 Singles Chart, but peaked at number seven on the NZ Hot Singles Chart.)	—	7	20	RIAA: Gold; ARIA: Gold; BPI: Platinum	Encanto
"What Else Can I Do?" (with Diane Guerrero)	2021	27	63	41	—	34	—	— (Note: "What Else Can I Do?" did not enter the NZ Top 40 Singles Chart, but peaked at number nine on the NZ Hot Singles Chart.)	—	29	34	RIAA: Gold; BPI: Silver	Encanto
"Waiting on a Miracle"	2021	48	89	57	—	—	—	—	—	—	51	BPI: Gold	Encanto
"All of You" (with Olga Merediz, John Leguizamo, Adassa, and Maluma)	2021	71	—	83	—	—	—	—	—	—	111	BPI: Silver	Encanto
"You Didn't Know" (with Erika Henningsen, Shoba Narayan, Patina Miller, Jessica Vosk, and Alex Brightman)	2024	— (Note: "You Didn't Know" did not enter the Billboard Hot 100, but peaked at number 25 on the Bubbling Under Hot 100.)	—	—	—	—	—	— (Note: "You Didn't Know" did not enter the NZ Top 40 Singles Chart, but peaked at number 24 on the NZ Hot Singles Chart.)	—	— (Note: "You Didn't Know" did not enter the UK Singles Chart, but peaked at number 47 on the UK Independent Singles Chart.)	—		Hazbin Hotel Original Soundtrack (Pt. 2)
"Easy" (with Erika Henningsen)	2025	—	—	—	—	—	—	— (Note: "Easy" did not enter the NZ Top 40 Singles Chart, but peaked at number 13 on the NZ Hot Singles Chart.)	—	—	—		Hazbin Hotel: Season Two (Original Soundtrack)
"When I Think About the Future" (with Erika Henningsen, Krystina Alabado, Keith David, Kevin Del Aguila, Kimiko Glenn, Shoba Narayan, Christian Borle, Amir Talai, Joel Perez, Lilli Cooper, Jeremy Jordan, Jessica Vosk, Patrick Stump, and Patina Miller)	2025	—	—	—	—	—	—	— (Note: "When I Think About the Future" did not enter the NZ Top 40 Singles Chart, but peaked at number 37 on the NZ Hot Singles Chart.)	—	—	—		Hazbin Hotel: Season Two (Original Soundtrack)
"Hear My Hope" (with Shoba Narayan, Erika Henningsen, Keith David, Kimiko Glenn, Blake Roman, Kevin Del Aguila, Krystina Alabado, Jessica Vosk, Patrick Stump, Alex Brightman, Daphne Rubin-Vega, James Monroe Iglehart, Andrew Durand, Leslie Kritzer, Amir Talai, Alex Newell, Joel Perez, Lilli Cooper, and Christian Borle)	2025	—	—	—	—	—	—	— (Note: "Hear My Hope" did not enter the NZ Top 40 Singles Chart, but peaked at number 20 on the NZ Hot Singles Chart.)	—	—	—		Hazbin Hotel: Season Two (Original Soundtrack)
"—" denotes songs which were not released in that country or did not chart.

=== Guest appearances ===
List of non-single guest appearances, showing other artist(s), year released and album name
Title	Year	Other artist(s)	Album
"5:15"	2019	None	The Lego Movie 2: The Second Part
"In The Heights"	2021	Anthony Ramos; Lin-Manuel Miranda; Olga Merediz; Jimmy Smits; Daphne Rubin-Vega; Dascha Polanco; Corey Hawkins; Gregory Diaz IV; Melissa Barrera	In The Heights
"No Me Diga"	2021	Daphne Rubin-Vega; Dascha Polanco; Leslie Grace; Melissa Barrera	In The Heights
"96,000"	2021	Anthony Ramos; Corey Hawkins; Gregory Diaz IV; Noah Catala; Daphne Rubin-Vega; Dascha Polanco; Melissa Barrera	In The Heights
"Blackout"	2021	Anthony Ramos; Corey Hawkins; Melissa Barrera; Olga Merediz; Gregory Diaz IV; Noah Catala; Daphne Rubin-Vega; Dascha Polanco	In The Heights
"Alabanza"	2021	Anthony Ramos; Leslie Grace; Jimmy Smits; Noah Catala; Melissa Barrera; Corey Hawkins; Gregory Diaz IV; Dascha Polanco; Daphne Rubin-Vega	In The Heights
"Carnaval del Barrio"	2021	Daphne Rubin-Vega; Dascha Polanco; Melissa Barrera; Anthony Ramos; Lin-Manuel Miranda; Corey Hawkins; Gregory Diaz IV; Leslie Grace	In The Heights
"Finale"	2021	Doreen Montalvo; Anthony Ramos; Daphne Rubin-Vega; Dascha Polanco; Jimmy Smits; Lin-Manuel Miranda; Leslie Grace; Melissa Barrera	In The Heights
"Keep It Low Key"	2021	Tituss Burgess; Daveed Diggs; Rory O'Malley	Central Park
"Happy Day in Hell"	2023	Erika Henningsen; Mick Lauer; Keith David; Blake Roman	Hazbin Hotel (Original Soundtrack)
"It Starts with Sorry"	2024	Alex Brightman; Erika Henningsen; Blake Roman	Hazbin Hotel Original Soundtrack (Pt. 1)
"Whatever It Takes"	2024	Daphne Rubin-Vega; James Monroe Iglehart	Hazbin Hotel Original Soundtrack (Pt. 1)
"You Didn't Know"	2024	Erika Henningsen; Shoba Narayan; Patina Miller; Jessica Vosk	Hazbin Hotel Original Soundtrack (Pt. 2)
"More Than Anything - Reprise"	2024	Erika Henningsen	Hazbin Hotel Original Soundtrack (Pt. 3)
"Finale"	2024	Erika Henningsen; Jeremy Jordan; Amir Talai; Blake Roman; Keith David; Christian Borle; Joel Perez; Kimiko Glenn; Krystina Alabado	Hazbin Hotel Original Soundtrack (Pt. 3)
"Hazbin Guarantee (Trust Us)"	2025	Erika Henningsen; Christian Borle; Joel Perez; Lilli Cooper; Kevin Del Aguila; Krystina Alabado; Keith David; Kimiko Glenn; Amir Talai	Hazbin Hotel: Season Two (Original Soundtrack)
"Easy"	2025	Erika Henningsen	Hazbin Hotel: Season Two (Original Soundtrack)
"When I Think About the Future"	2025	Erika Henningsen; Krystina Alabado; Keith David; Kevin Del Aguila; Kimiko Glenn; Amir Talai; Joel Perez; Lilli Cooper; Jeremy Jordan; Jessica Vosk; Patrick Stump; Patina Miller	Hazbin Hotel: Season Two (Original Soundtrack)
"Hear My Hope"	2025	Shoba Narayan; Erika Henningsen; Keith David; Kimiko Glenn; Blake Roman; Kevin Del Aguila; Krystina Alabado; Jessica Vosk; Patrick Stump; Alex Brightman; Daphne Rubin-Vega; James Monroe Iglehart; Andrew Durand; Leslie Kritzer; Amir Talai; Alex Newell; Joel Perez; Lilli Cooper; Christian Borle	Hazbin Hotel: Season Two (Original Soundtrack)

== Awards and nominations ==
Year	Association	Category	Nominated work	Result
2014	Actor Awards	Outstanding Performance by an Ensemble in a Comedy Series	Brooklyn Nine-Nine	Nominated
2014	Imagen Awards	Best Supporting Actress – Television	Brooklyn Nine-Nine	Nominated
2016	Imagen Awards	Best Supporting Actress – Television	Brooklyn Nine-Nine	Nominated
2018	Imagen Awards	Best Supporting Actress – Television	Brooklyn Nine-Nine	Won
2019	Imagen Awards	Best Supporting Actress – Television	Brooklyn Nine-Nine	Nominated
2019	Gracie Awards	Outstanding Actress in a Supporting Role – Comedy or Musical	Brooklyn Nine-Nine	Won
2020	Gracie Awards	Outstanding Actress in a Supporting Role – Comedy or Musical	Brooklyn Nine-Nine	Won
2021	Annie Awards	Outstanding Achievement for Voice Acting in a Feature Production	Encanto	Nominated
2021	Washington D.C. Area Film Critics Association Awards	Best Voice Performance	Encanto	Nominated
2021	Austin Film Critics Association Awards	Best Voice Acting/Animated/Digital Performance	Encanto	Nominated
2022	Hollywood Critics Association Film Awards	Best Animated or VFX Performance	Encanto	Won
2022	Hollywood Critics Association TV Awards	Best Supporting Actress in a Broadcast Network or Cable Series, Comedy	Brooklyn Nine-Nine	Nominated
2022	American Music Awards	Collaboration of the Year	"We Don't Talk About Bruno" from Encanto	Nominated
2022	American Music Awards	Best Pop Song	"We Don't Talk About Bruno" from Encanto	Nominated
2022	MTV Movie & TV Awards	Best Musical Moment	"We Don't Talk About Bruno" from Encanto	Nominated
2022	Imagen Awards	Best Actress	Encanto	Nominated
2023	Brit Awards	International Song	"We Don't Talk About Bruno" from Encanto	Nominated
2023	Grammy Awards	Best Song Written for Visual Media	"We Don't Talk About Bruno" from Encanto	Won
2026	Astra TV Awards	Best Supporting Voice-Over Performance	Hazbin Hotel	Won
2026	Imagen Awards	Best Actor – Comedy	Twisted Metal	Won (tie)
2026	Imagen Awards	Best Voice-Over Actor	Hazbin Hotel	Nominated
