= Judy (surname) =

Judy is the surname of:

- Eric Judy (born 1974), American musician
- John F. Judy (1856–1931), founder of Judyville, Indiana
- Samuel Judy (1773–1838), American pioneer and legislator
- Steven Judy (1956–1981), American mass murderer
- Thomas Judy (1804–1879), American legislator
- Phillip Judy, founder of the Judy Company

== Fictional characters ==
- Doug Judy, recurring character on the American television series Brooklyn Nine-Nine
