= Hitchcock & Scully =

- Brooklyn Nine-Nine episode
- Episode no.: Season 6 Episode 2
- Directed by: Cortney Carrillo
- Written by: Lang Fisher
- Production code: 602
- Original air date: January 17, 2019
- Running time: 21 minutes

Guest appearances
- Alan Ritchson as Young Scully; Wyatt Nash as Young Hitchcock; Phil Reeves as Commissioner Kelly; Donna D'Errico as Marissa Costa; Daniel Di Tomasso as Young Gio Costa; Robert Maffia as Gio Costa; Decker Sadowski as Young Marissa Costa

Episode chronology
← Previous "Honeymoon"	Next → "The Tattler"
- Brooklyn Nine-Nine season 6

"Hitchcock & Scully" is the second episode of the sixth season of the American television police sitcom series Brooklyn Nine-Nine, and the 114th overall episode of the series. The episode was written by Lang Fisher and directed by Cortney Carrillo.

In the episode, Jake and Charles investigate a case from Hitchcock and Scully's younger days to determine if the two older detectives are withholding stolen cash. Due to Holt's campaign against John Kelly, the Commissioner closes off the lower level and forces most of the departments to work in a tight space, leading Amy and her officers into conflict with Terry and Rosa. Gina helps Holt prepare for a television interview but ends up taking it herself.

== Plot ==
In a flashback to 1986, a young Scully (Alan Ritchson), and a young Hitchcock (Wyatt Nash) take down mafia boss Gio Costa (Daniel Di Tomasso) with the help of Marissa Costa (Decker Sadowski), Gio's wife. The episode cuts to the present day with Captain Holt (Andre Braugher) calling Jake Peralta (Andy Samberg) and Charles Boyle (Joe Lo Truglio) into his office to tell them that Hitchcock (Dirk Blocker) and Scully (Joel McKinnon Miller) were contacted by someone in Internal Affairs who has reopened the case. Holt suspects that Commissioner Kelly (Phil Reeves) is trying to create a scandal and sends Jake and Charles to reevaluate the case. Jake and Charles interrogate Hitchcock and Scully. Hitchcock tells Jake that they took down Gio, then intercepted a ton of cocaine and three duffel bags full of cash. However, a photo from the night of the bust shows Hitchcock and Scully with four duffel bags. The detectives then defensively suggest they missed the fourth bag. Jake, suspicious of the duo, decides to continue with the investigation.

In an attempt to prove their innocence, Hitchcock and Scully both turn over their financial records, revealing that Hitchcock has a monthly parking spot for an old sex van that he uses as a home between marriages. Jake and Charles go into the van to find the fourth duffel bag empty. Hitchcock and Scully then lock them in the van and escape in Jake's car. Jake and Charles drive the van to find Hitchcock and Scully at "Wing Slutz" –a restaurant that they patronize frequently. Jake and Charles confront Hitchcock and Scully but the manager steps in and reveals herself to be Marissa (Donna D'Errico). Hitchcock and Scully tell Jake and Charles that Marissa was their criminal informant in the mafia and that they stole the money for her after their captain refused to place her in witness protection. A call comes from Holt saying that Internal Affairs never reopened the case and it was highly likely that Hitchcock and Scully were called by Gio Costa himself. The mafia then shows up having tracked their location although the squad shows up and subdues Costa. Costa gets hold of a gun and fires shots at Marissa, but Hitchcock and Scully jump in front of her, stopping the bullets with tubs of sauce that they strapped to their bodies.

Meanwhile, at the precinct, tensions escalate among the "upstairs people", consisting of Terry (Terry Crews) and the detective squad, and the "downstairs people", Amy (Melissa Fumero) and her uniformed officers, and Holt prepares for a television interview where he intends to speak out against Kelly's new initiatives for the NYPD. Holt misses his interview to help Hitchcock, Scully, Jake, and Charles. Gina (Chelsea Peretti) fills in for him and is proud to break a record for most viewer complaints. Holt apologizes to the squad for his shortsightedness in his pursuit of justice.

== Reception ==
=== Viewers ===
According to Nielsen Media Research, "Hitchcock & Scully" was seen by an estimated 2.83 million household viewers and gained a 0.9/5 share among adults aged 18–49, beating The Good Place and Gotham but behind Law & Order: Special Victims Unit and The Big Bang Theory.

=== Critical reviews ===
"Hitchcock & Scully" was met with positive reception from critics. LaToya Ferguson of The A.V. Club gave the episode a "B+" grade and wrote "from the cold open, the episode is instantly a strange success". Alan Sepinwall of Rolling Stone praised the episode for taking a more in-depth look into the background of the pair. Collider named the episode's cold open one of the best of the series.
