= The Puzzle Master =

- Brooklyn Nine-Nine episode
- Episode no.: Season 5 Episode 15
- Directed by: Akiva Schaffer
- Written by: Lang Fisher
- Cinematography by: Giovani Lampassi
- Editing by: Jeremy Reuben
- Production code: 514
- Original air date: April 8, 2018
- Running time: 22 minutes

Guest appearances
- David Fumero as Melvin Stermley; Will Shortz as Sam Jepsen; Allison Tolman as Olivia Crawford

Episode chronology
← Previous "The Box"	Next → "NutriBoom"
- Brooklyn Nine-Nine season 5

"The Puzzle Master" is the 15th episode of the fifth season of the American television police sitcom series Brooklyn Nine-Nine, and the 105th overall episode of the series. The episode was written by Lang Fisher and directed by Akiva Schaffer. It aired on Fox in the United States on April 8, 2018. The episode features guest appearances from David Fumero, Will Shortz, and Allison Tolman.

The show revolves around the fictitious 99th precinct of the New York Police Department in Brooklyn and the officers and detectives that work in the precinct. In the episode, Jake and Amy work on their last case before Amy becomes a sergeant by working with Amy's favorite puzzle master, Vin Stermley. However, when Vin and Amy bond throughout the investigation, Jake grows jealous. Meanwhile, Holt and Gina meet the competition for Police Commissioner and are intimidated by a young woman in the running while Terry, Rosa, Hitchcock, and Scully debate over who should get the new Detective car.

According to Nielsen Media Research, the episode was seen by an estimated 1.74 million household viewers and gained a 0.8/3 ratings share among adults aged 18–49. The episode received positive reviews from critics, who praised Samberg's performance, character development and writing although the subplots received a mixed response.

== Plot ==
Amy (Melissa Fumero) learns that she has passed her Sergeant's Exam and will be officially promoted in a week. Jake (Andy Samberg) decides to work with her on their last case before she is a sergeant and chooses an investigation of a series of arsons connected with Amy's love for crosswords.

To Amy's delight, Jake brings in the victim, Amy's favorite puzzle author, Melvin Stermley (David Fumero). To Jake's dismay, however, “Vin” turns out to be hunky, personable, and the opposite of the nerd Jake envisioned. Vin and Amy begin bonding throughout the case, causing Jake to feel jealous. Jake comes to believe that Vin's friend Sam Jepsen is starting the fires, but Amy and Vin come to believe that a different person is starting the fires to spell their name. While pursuing a suspect due to Vin's hunch, Jake doesn't follow protocol and monitors Jepsen. However, Jepsen turns out to be innocent and the real arsonist starts a fire where Jake was supposed to guard, angering Amy. After Jake apologizes for his behavior, he solves the case by finding that it was Vin's obsessed neighbor who caused the fires as part of an elaborate marriage proposal and death threat for Vin.

Meanwhile, Holt (Andre Braugher) and Gina (Chelsea Peretti) meet the competition for the Police Commissioner position. At the meeting, Holt is intimidated by Captain Olivia Crawford (Allison Tolman) who is in the running for the position and is opposed to precincts. He considers allying with one of the selectors, Patrick, only for Patrick to claim that Crawford was nominated as a public relations ploy and that the NYPD should not have a female Commissioner. Holt reveals this to the audience, causing a new group to be selected to nominate the Commissioner. As a result, Holt and Crawford depart from the incident as "frenemies."

At the same time, Terry (Terry Crews), Rosa (Stephanie Beatriz), Hitchcock (Dirk Blocker), and Scully (Joel McKinnon Miller) debate over who should get the new Detective car. Terry tries to solve the issue by having them draw names from the basket, but the other three accuse him of cheating after he draws his own name. Eventually, Terry breaks down and confesses. Rosa decides to give it to Terry as she feels that he is willing to help his colleagues whenever in need. She tricks Hitchcock and Scully into agreeing by washing their car and claiming that it is a new model.

== Reception ==
=== Viewers ===
In its original American broadcast, "The Puzzle Master" was seen by an estimated 1.74 million household viewers and gained a 0.8/3 ratings share among adults aged 18–49, according to Nielsen Media Research. This was slight decrease in viewership from the previous episode, which was watched by 1.78 million viewers with a 0.8/3 in the 18-49 demographics. This means that 0.8 percent of all households with televisions watched the episode, while 3 percent of all households watching television at that time watched it. With these ratings, Brooklyn Nine-Nine was the third highest rated show on FOX for the night, beating The Last Man on Earth, and Bob's Burgers but behind Family Guy and The Simpsons, fifth on its timeslot and ninth for the night, behind a rerun of Family Guy, The Simpsons, a rerun of America's Funniest Home Videos, Little Big Shots, Instinct, NCIS: Los Angeles, American Idol, and 60 Minutes.

=== Critical reviews ===
"The Puzzle Master" received positive reviews from critics. Genevieve Valentine of The A.V. Club gave the episode a "B+" grade and wrote, "When a series reaches a certain age, it gets a sense of narrative moving in both directions. There's the history the show has made, and the pull of the future on the shape of the story. Brooklyn Nine-Nine is old enough to have built a world to draw on, but ambitious enough to recognize the need for change. In the past, most of the forward motion has been conveniently sidestepped in order to keep the team together. But whatever happens from here, with Amy on the cusp of becoming a sergeant and Captain Holt hoping to be the next Commissioner, 'The Puzzle Master' feels like it's very deliberately looking ahead."
