= Lang Fisher =

American comedy writer and director

- Born: January 29, 1980 (age 45)
- Education: Columbia University (BA)
- Occupation: Television writer
- Years active: 2007 – present
- Known for: co-creating Never Have I Ever with Mindy Kaling
- Awards: The Peabody Awards (2008)

Lang Fisher (born January 29, 1980) is an American comedy writer and director. She co-created and executive produced the Netflix coming-of-age comedy-drama series, Never Have I Ever.

== Career ==
Fisher graduated from Fountain Valley School of Colorado in 1998 and Columbia University in 2002. At Columbia, she was a member of the annual Varsity Show. Her cast and staff-mates included future actress Jenny Slate, comedian Michelle Collins, Gabe Liedman, who is the show-runner of Netflix animated series Q-Force and Hulu comedy series PEN15, Emmy Award-nominated stage actor Brandon Victor Dixon, managing editor of The Onion and Upworthy co-founder Peter Koechley, Onion News Network founder and director Will Graham, and Robby Mook, manager of Hillary Clinton's 2016 presidential campaign. Her classmates also included award-winning director and producer Susanna Fogel.

She was a staff writer for The Onion as well as its TV spin-off, the Onion News Network, for six years and was a member of its award-winning writing staff before joining 30 Rock as a staff writer in its final season. The episode she co-wrote, "A Goon's Deed in a Weary World", received critical acclaim and was named by Variety magazine as one of the "25 Best TV Episodes of the Decade (2010-2019)" in 2019.

From 2013 to 2017, Fisher wrote, directed and co-executive produced on the romantic comedy series, The Mindy Project. She started writing on the series in season 2. Fisher wrote the 12th episode of season 5, "Mindy Lahiri is a White Man."

From 2017 to 2019, Fisher was a writer and Co-Executive Producer on the police procedural comedy, Brooklyn Nine-Nine. Fisher wrote the 8th episode of the show's 6th season, titled "He Said, She Said." The episode explored sexual assault in the workplace and was Stephanie Beatriz's directorial debut. She also wrote the episodes ''Hitchcock & Scully" and ''The Puzzle Master" for the show.

In 2019, Fisher wrote and co-created Never Have I Ever with Mindy Kaling and serves as the showrunner.

== Filmography ==
Year	Title	Notes
2007–2010	The Onion	Director, writer
2011	Onion News Network	Writer
2013	30 Rock	Writer
2013–2017	The Mindy Project	Co-executive producer, writer, executive story editor, director (1 episode)
2017–2019	Brooklyn Nine-Nine	Co-executive producer, writer
2020–2021	Never Have I Ever	Co-creator, executive producer, writer, director (1 episode)
2025	The Four Seasons	Co-creator, executive producer, showrunner, writer, director (2 episodes)

== Awards ==
Fisher was nominated for the Writers Guild of America Award for Television: Comedy Series in 2014 for her work on 30 Rock. She was nominated in 2021 for the NAACP Image Award for Outstanding Writing in a Comedy Series.

In 2008, she was part of The Onion's team that won the Peabody Awards.
