= The Negotiation (Brooklyn Nine-Nine) =

- Brooklyn Nine-Nine episode
- Episode no.: Season 5 Episode 13
- Directed by: Linda Mendoza
- Written by: Phil Augusta Jackson
- Cinematography by: Giovani Lampassi
- Editing by: Jason Gill
- Production code: 513
- Original air date: March 25, 2018
- Running time: 21 minutes

Guest appearances
- Craig Robinson as Doug Judy; Chris Bauer as Dennis Kole

Episode chronology
← Previous "Safe House"	Next → "The Box"
- Brooklyn Nine-Nine season 5

"The Negotiation" is the 13th episode of the fifth season of the American television police sitcom series Brooklyn Nine-Nine, and the 103rd overall episode of the series. The episode was written by Phil Augusta Jackson and directed by Linda Mendoza. It aired on Fox in the United States on March 25, 2018. The episode features guest appearances from Craig Robinson and Chris Bauer.

The show revolves around the fictitious 99th precinct of the New York Police Department in Brooklyn and the officers and detectives that work in the precinct. In the episode, Jake and Rosa respond to a hostage situation in a jewelry store, only to discover that the perpetrator is Doug Judy, who asks for help regarding his mother's life. Meanwhile, Amy and Gina help Boyle with his food truck while Holt and Terry help Hitchcock pass an interview.

According to Nielsen Media Research, the episode was seen by an estimated 1.83 million household viewers and gained a 0.9/4 ratings share among adults aged 18–49. The episode received positive reviews from critics, who praised Robinson's guest performance.

== Plot ==
Jake (Andy Samberg) is called as a negotiator on a hostage situation in a jewelry store, much to his excitement and to the dismay of Dennis Kole (Chris Bauer), who wanted to act as the negotiator. However, the perpetrator turns out to be Doug Judy (Craig Robinson).

Judy explains that he has upset a drug dealer, Holloway, who will kill his mother if he does not give him the diamonds to pay off an old debt. Instead, they plan to set up Holloway for an arrest and take Judy and the diamonds into custody after, which Judy agrees to as long as his mother is safe. Using Rosa's (Stephanie Beatriz) and Scully's (Joel McKinnon Miller) help, Jake and Judy manage to escape the store with diamonds and meet with the criminal but they're interrupted by Kole, who helps Jake catch the criminal. However, Judy flees with the diamonds, and Jake faces suspension for letting him go. Rosa calls Jake gullible for falling for Judy's plan. Jake is then given instructions to go to a karaoke bar where he retrieves the diamonds, and it is explained that Judy left the diamonds there as a gift for Jake so he will not be suspended.

Meanwhile, Boyle (Joe Lo Truglio) begins his food truck business and Amy (Melissa Fumero) and Gina (Chelsea Peretti) agree to help him. However, his perfectionist attitude and rudeness make them quit. Boyle later apologizes for his behavior, although they won't work for him anymore.

In a separate plot point, Holt (Andre Braugher) and Terry (Terry Crews) have to change Hitchcock's (Dirk Blocker) attitude in order to pass an interview for Holt's commissioner position. Although they only have an hour to prepare, the interview is a success. Holt and Terry ask Hitchcock why he doesn't change his behavior for good, but Hitchcock immediately reverts to his old self.

== Reception ==
=== Viewers ===
In its original American broadcast, "The Negotiation" was seen by an estimated 1.83 million household viewers and gained a 0.9/4 ratings share among adults aged 18–49, according to Nielsen Media Research. This was slight decrease in viewership from the previous episode, which was watched by 1.92 million viewers with a 0.9/4 in the 18-49 demographics. This means that 0.9 percent of all households with televisions watched the episode, while 4 percent of all households watching television at that time watched it. With these ratings, Brooklyn Nine-Nine was the third highest rated show on FOX for the night, beating The Last Man on Earth, and Bob's Burgers but behind Family Guy and The Simpsons, fifth on its timeslot and tenth for the night, behind Family Guy, Little Big Shots, The Simpsons, America's Funniest Home Videos, NCIS: Los Angeles, Instinct, American Idol, 60 Minutes, and an NCAA Tournament game.

=== Critical reviews ===
"The Negotiation" received positive reviews from critics. LaToya Ferguson of The A.V. Club gave the episode a "B+" grade and wrote, "'The Negotiation' obviously exists to have another chapter in the Pontiac Bandit saga, and as such, the other stories in this episode aren't all that fleshed out. (They don't really need to be, as I'll explain.) Even the story that relates to Holt's quest to become Commissioner isn't really about Holt's quest to become Commissioner."

Alan Sepinwall of Uproxx wrote, "'The Negotiation' brings back that tension by forcing Judy back into a life of crime to keep a drug kingpin from killing his mother. On the one hand, it's fun as always to have Samberg and Robinson riffing and singing and enjoying each other's company, and to have Jake constantly aware that he's going too far with this guy. On the other, it felt like he really did go too far, even for this silly, fictionalized version of the NYPD, for everything to turn out okay after Judy returned the stolen diamonds to him."
