= The Box (Brooklyn Nine-Nine) =

- Brooklyn Nine-Nine episode
- Episode no.: Season 5 Episode 14
- Directed by: Claire Scanlon
- Written by: Luke Del Tredici
- Cinematography by: Giovani Lampassi
- Editing by: Jeremy Reuben
- Production code: 516
- Original air date: April 1, 2018
- Running time: 22 minutes

Guest appearances
- Sterling K. Brown as Phillip Davidson; Romy Rosemont as Elaine Nixon

Episode chronology
← Previous "The Negotiation"	Next → "The Puzzle Master"
- Brooklyn Nine-Nine season 5

"The Box" is the 14th episode of the fifth season of the American television police sitcom series Brooklyn Nine-Nine, and the 104th overall episode of the series. The episode was written by Luke Del Tredici and directed by Claire Scanlon. It aired on Fox in the United States on April 1, 2018. The bottle episode features guest appearances from Sterling K. Brown and Romy Rosemont.

The show revolves around the fictitious 99th precinct of the New York Police Department in Brooklyn and the officers and detectives that work in the precinct. In the episode, Jake and Holt spend the night interrogating Phillip Davidson, a dentist who is the prime suspect behind his partner's death. The interrogation turns out to be more difficult than expected when Davidson is able to deflect all accusations as well as manipulate both Jake and Holt into making mistakes.

According to Nielsen Media Research, the episode was seen by an estimated 1.78 million household viewers and gained a 0.8/3 ratings share among adults aged 18–49. The episode received acclaim from critics, who praised Samberg's, Braugher's and Brown's performances, the writing, tension, and homage to the Homicide: Life on the Street episode "Three Men and Adena", which also starred Braugher. For his performance in the episode, Sterling K. Brown was nominated for the Primetime Emmy Award for Outstanding Guest Actor in a Comedy Series.

== Plot ==
Phillip Davidson (Sterling K. Brown), a successful dentist, is called to the precinct to be questioned about his business partner Robert Tupper's death. Jake Peralta (Andy Samberg) informs Captain Holt (Andre Braugher) about the case, prompting Holt to cancel his evening plans to take part in the interrogation. The crime has no physical evidence and, therefore, the two must produce a confession in order to prosecute. Jake's initial questioning falls flat when Davidson anticipates his strategy; Holt improvises a "smart cop–dumb cop" riff that succeeds in getting Davidson to reveal he knew where the body was found despite that detail not being released to the public. Davidson, however, recovers and claims that Tupper's wife told him where the body was found.

The interrogation continues into the night as Davidson heads off their accusations by having an alibi and explanations for any inconsistencies regarding his whereabouts when Tupper was killed. As Jake and Holt's various interrogation tactics repeatedly fail, Davidson manages to erode Jake's trust in Holt and even rattles Holt by mocking PhDs who call themselves "Doctor". Eventually, against Holt's advice, Jake lies about a witness seeing Davidson at the scene of the crime (citing Frazier v. Cupp which allows police to lie in interrogations to elicit confessions), but this too fails as the supposed witness has been dead for over three years. Davidson calls in his lawyer (Romy Rosemont) and calmly awaits the interrogation's time limit.

At the last minute, Jake finally comes up with the solution and confronts Davidson with his theory: Davidson was stealing meds from his office, and Tupper found out and threatened to call the police. Davidson, in Jake's telling, bludgeoned Tupper with a glass trophy and panicked, managing through sheer luck to escape with the body to his uncle's cabin. Davidson repeatedly denies Jake's theory while becoming more and more agitated, and finally blurts out that he killed his partner after meticulous planning, and wasn't just an incapable amateur who "got lucky". As they leave the precinct, Jake tells Holt he realised Davidson wanted them to know how smart he was and that he'd planned the perfect murder, so Jake's constant needling about how lucky he was angered him to the point of confessing. They are then greeted by Charles Boyle (Joe Lo Truglio) coming in, and as the pair realize they spent the whole night in the precinct, they go back in to prepare for another day of work.

== Reception ==
=== Viewers ===
In its original American broadcast, "The Box" was seen by an estimated 1.78 million household viewers and gained a 0.8/3 ratings share among adults aged 18–49, according to Nielsen Media Research. This was slight decrease in viewership from the previous episode, which was watched by 1.83 million viewers with a 0.9/4 in the 18-49 demographics. This means that 0.8 percent of all households with televisions watched the episode, while 3 percent of all households watching television at that time watched it. With these ratings, Brooklyn Nine-Nine was the third highest rated show on FOX for the night, beating The Last Man on Earth, and Bob's Burgers but behind Family Guy and The Simpsons, fourth on its timeslot and tenth for the night, behind a rerun of Roseanne, Deception, Dateline NBC, NCIS: Los Angeles, Family Guy, The Simpsons, American Idol, and Jesus Christ Superstar Live in Concert.

=== Critical response ===
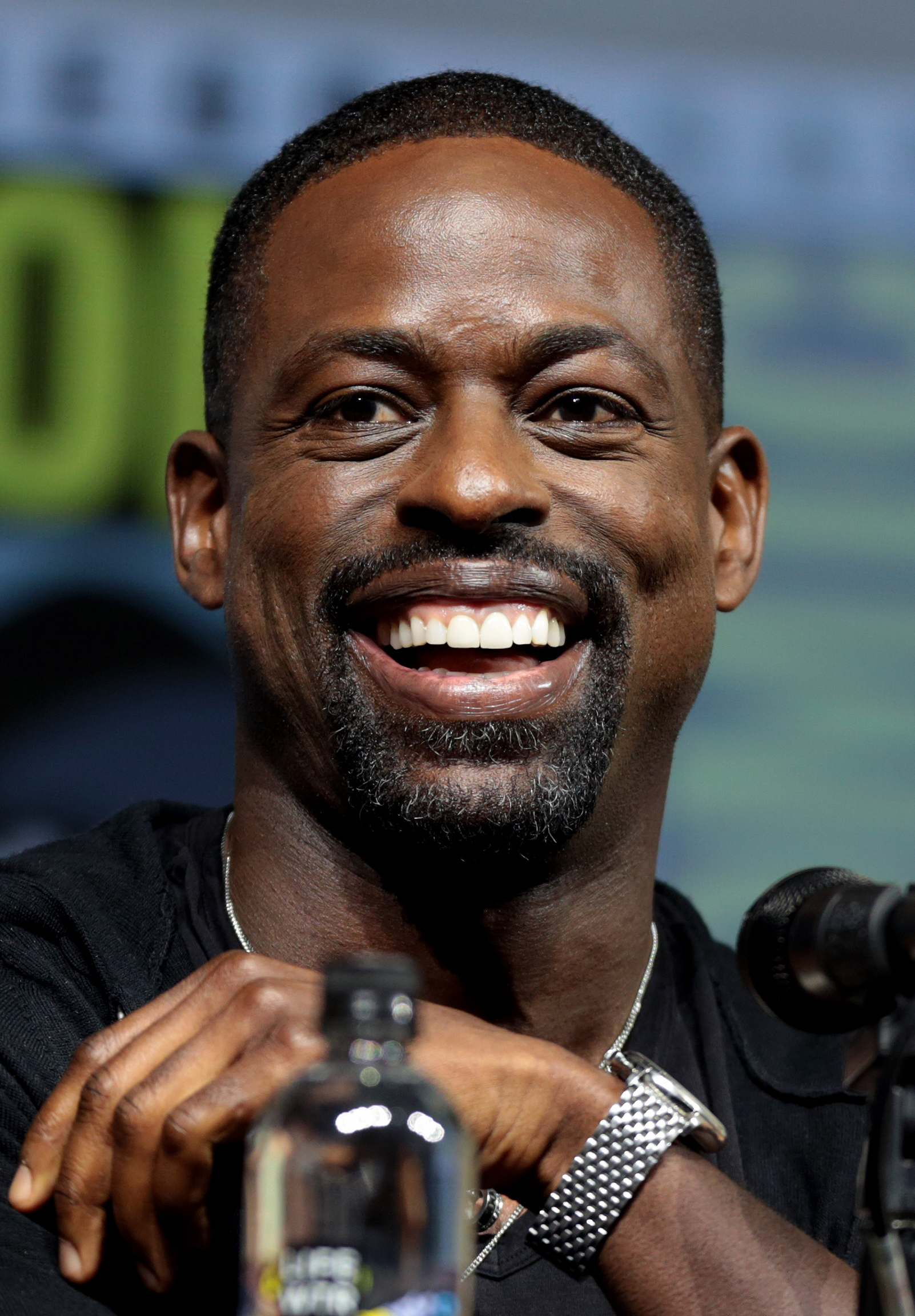
Sterling K. Brown received a Primetime Emmy Award nomination for Outstanding Guest Actor in a Comedy Series for his performance in the episode.

"The Box" received acclaim from critics. LaToya Ferguson of The A.V. Club he gave the episode an "A" grade and wrote, "'The Box' has such a simple but captivating premise, and its execution makes for an instantly rewatchable episode. Plus, Andy Samberg and especially Andre Braugher and Sterling K. Brown put on some damn good performances here. In fact, is it too soon to give Brown the Outstanding Guest Actor in a Comedy Emmy just for his scene saying the victim's name in different ways?" Daniel Kurland of Vulture wrote, "'The Box' gets far with a simple, but effective, structural approach to its interrogation. A lot of the first act has Jake and Raymond sequestered together as they formulate theories and bounce off of each other before they let Davidson into the equation. Holt is also eager to get his hands dirty again as he misses this aspect from his detective days, and Peralta knows an interrogation works better with two people so they can get some sort of Rush Hour/good cop, bad cop dynamic going on."

Steve Greene of IndieWire wrote, "'The Box' is a great example of what 'Brooklyn Nine-Nine' can do when it throws a wrench into its own rhythms. Jokes whizzing by at lightning speed (almost too fast to register Holt asking who Amy Adams is) require performers to cut straight to the punchline and not luxuriate in it too much. Even when Brown has to make those crazy faces in the rapid-fire back-and-forth, he gives it just enough of a difference to show that this is a character who enjoys acting almost as much as Brown seems to." Alan Sepinwall of Uproxx wrote, "Instead, 'The Box' turns out to be a very effective story about Jake once again seeking his boss's approval, and nearly blowing the case in the process. Because the interrogation has to feel real on some level, it's a bit lighter on jokes than your average episode, but still has plenty of humor both silly (Peralta's obnoxious song) and dry (Holt explaining that Jake pretending to be angry is 'like being yelled at by a children's cereal mascot') building up to the moment where Jake solves the puzzle by figuring out how to turn the bad guy's arrogance against him, until Holt drops his usual reserve to let out three consecutive 'Oh, damn!'s." Caroline Framke of Vox wrote, "This sounds easy enough, but make no mistake: The timing of each of these moments is very carefully chosen, by Scanlon during shooting and by Reuben after. Every decision of exactly when to move from one scene or joke to the next is a crucial one, and with 'The Box,' Reuben rose spectacularly to the occasion."
