= Jake & Amy =

- Brooklyn Nine-Nine episode
- Episode no.: Season 5 Episode 22
- Directed by: Dan Goor
- Written by: Dan Goor; Luke Del Tredici
- Cinematography by: Giovani Lampassi
- Editing by: Cortney Carrillo; Jeremy Reuben
- Production code: 522
- Original air date: May 20, 2018
- Running time: 22 minutes

Guest appearances
- Gina Rodriguez as Alicia; Kyle Bornheimer as Teddy Wells; Fred Armisen as Mlepnos; Kyle Gass as Dario Moretti

Episode chronology
← Previous "White Whale"	Next → "Honeymoon"
- Brooklyn Nine-Nine season 5

"Jake & Amy" is the 22nd episode and season finale of the fifth season of the American television police sitcom series Brooklyn Nine-Nine, and the 112th overall episode of the series. The episode was written by series co-creator Dan Goor and Luke Del Tredici, and directed by Goor. It aired on Fox in the United States on May 20, 2018. It was the last episode to air on Fox, following their cancellation of the series and its subsequent pick-up by NBC. The episode features guest appearances from Gina Rodriguez, Kyle Bornheimer, and Fred Armisen, while Kyle Gass co-stars.

The show revolves around the fictitious 99th precinct of the New York Police Department in Brooklyn and the officers and detectives that work in the precinct. In the episode, Jake Peralta (Andy Samberg) and Amy Santiago's (Melissa Fumero) wedding plans go awry when someone threatens to detonate a bomb in their venue, and Amy's ex-boyfriend Teddy Wells (Kyle Bornheimer), turns out to be the anti-bombs squad leader. During this, Raymond Holt (Andre Braugher) finally gets the results of the commissioner position and Terry Jeffords (Terry Crews) and Rosa Diaz (Stephanie Beatriz) try to fix Amy's ruined veil before the wedding.

According to Nielsen Media Research, the episode was seen by an estimated 1.79 million household viewers and gained a 0.8/3 ratings share among adults aged 18–49. The episode received acclaim from critics, who praised the performances, chemistry, writing and resolution to the show's tenure on Fox.

== Plot ==
It is the wedding day of Jake (Andy Samberg) and Amy (Melissa Fumero). The wedding does not go as planned when Amy's veil is ruined and the venue is forced to be evacuated when someone calls Jake with a bomb threat for the venue. The person got the address when Boyle (Joe Lo Truglio) posted the venue's address in the newspaper.

To Jake's and Amy's dismay, Amy's ex-boyfriend Teddy (Kyle Bornheimer) is the leader of the bomb squad that will handle the bomb. Jake, Amy, and Boyle try to find suspects, and discover that the culprit was a criminal (Kyle Gass) Amy had arrested in the past, and that he planted a bomb in the vents. They arrest him, but the bomb remains in the venue and they are told the wedding cannot happen that day. Terry (Terry Crews) has to fix the veil; he and Rosa (Stephanie Beatriz) take a cab driven by a woman named Alicia (Gina Rodriguez), whom Terry tries to hook Rosa up with.

Holt (Andre Braugher) receives an email informing him if he has successfully been appointed Commissioner, and holds off reading it out of fear. To compensate for the wedding, Boyle organizes the precinct to be the wedding ceremony. Holt officiates the wedding and Teddy helps bringing in the rings with a robot, to compensate for the venue. Jake and Amy are officially married. While celebrating at the bar, Holt tells the precinct that he got the results for the Commissioner campaign. He reads it and makes a gesture, leaving the precinct confused as to whether or not he got the position.

== Reception ==
=== Viewers ===
In its original American broadcast, "Jake & Amy" was seen by an estimated 1.79 million household viewers and gained a 0.8/3 ratings share among adults aged 18–49, according to Nielsen Media Research. This was a slight increase in viewership from the previous episode, which was watched by 1.75 million viewers with a 0.8/3 in the 18-49 demographics. This means that 0.8 percent of all households with televisions watched the episode, while 3 percent of all households watching television at that time watched it. With these ratings, Brooklyn Nine-Nine was the third highest rated show on Fox for the night, beating Bob's Burgers but behind Family Guy and The Simpsons, fifth on its timeslot and eight for the night, behind Family Guy, The Simpsons, NCIS: Los Angeles, 60 Minutes, America's Funniest Home Videos, American Idol, and 2018 Billboard Music Awards.

=== Critical reviews ===
"Jake & Amy" received acclaim from critics. LaToya Ferguson of The A.V. Club gave the episode an "A−" grade and wrote, "Because of the way the season set things up for this conclusion, 'White Whale' and 'Jake & Amy' get docked points for not following through on them. Would it have been better had there been no NutriBoom issues in the first place? Had there been an explanation for any last minute wedding planning? Yes, actually. In a self-contained situation, these last two episodes of the season absolutely fulfill every possible thing a Brooklyn Nine-Nine episode needs. But the thing about Brooklyn Nine-Nine is that it's made abundantly clear that 'self-contained situation' isn't exactly the name of the game. As for everything else? Flawless."

Alan Sepinwall of Uproxx wrote, "Where the series tends to blow up its status quo in its season finales, Jake & Amy was largely just a terrific, funny, and charming episode of a show that gets to go be all of those things on a new network next season. And we can worry about Holt's rank when we get there."
