= Honeymoon (Brooklyn Nine-Nine) =

- Brooklyn Nine-Nine episode
- Episode no.: Season 6 Episode 1
- Directed by: Giovani Lampassi
- Written by: Neil Campbell
- Cinematography by: Rick Page
- Editing by: Jason Gill
- Production code: 601
- Original air date: January 10, 2019
- Running time: 21 minutes

Episode chronology
← Previous "Jake & Amy"	Next → "Hitchcock & Scully"
- Brooklyn Nine-Nine season 6

"Honeymoon" is the season premiere of the sixth season of the American television police sitcom series Brooklyn Nine-Nine, and the 113th overall episode of the series. The episode was written by Neil Campbell and directed by Giovani Lampassi. It was the first episode of the series to air on NBC, after the network picked it up when Fox cancelled it in 2018.

The show revolves around the fictitious 99th precinct of the New York Police Department in Brooklyn and the officers and detectives that work in the precinct. In the episode, Jake and Amy go on a honeymoon in a Mexican hotel, but meets Holt (Andre Braugher) in the same hotel, who was taking some time off work as he was depressed from losing the Commissioner title to John Kelly. Back at the precinct, Rosa finds a struggling Terry, who is the interim captain, for advice on what to do about a drug case and Charles tries to find out from Gina why their parents are divorcing.

According to Nielsen Media Research, the episode was seen by an estimated 3.54 million household viewers and gained a 1.2/5 ratings share among adults aged 18–49. The episode received positive reviews from critics, who praised the writing, calling the episode a promising inception of the season under a new network. The episode was also the first of the series to feature bleep censors, which was previously prohibited during its run on FOX.

== Plot ==
Jake (Andy Samberg) and Amy (Melissa Fumero) go on their honeymoon at a Mexican beach resort. Coincidentally, they meet a depressed Holt (Andre Braugher), also staying at the same place. Holt decided to take some time off from work to recover from losing the Commissioner title to John Kelly (Phil Reeves), who was trying to push for a "vigilant policing" initiative. Holt starts to ruin their honeymoon by engaging in depressing monologues and self-wallowing around the newlyweds, such as when the couple is eating dinner, swimming or enjoying a spa session. Amy suggests to invite Holt to join their honeymoon activities to cheer him up. The plan worked, to Jake and Amy's relief, and Holt was starting to feel happier. However, Jake finds out that Holt was planning to quit his job as he was convinced that there was more to life than the NYPD. Consequently, Jake tricks Holt into his and Amy's hotel room to lock him up. Unbeknownst to Amy that Holt was in the room, she comes out dressed up as Holly Gennaro McClane from Die Hard as a form of sexual roleplay and is shocked. The two eventually tie Holt up on the bed to prevent him from leaving and try to talk him out of quitting the NYPD. Holt, in a fit of anger and misery, calls Jake selfish, which causes Amy to chide Holt. Holt eventually escapes, apologizes and offers to extend and compensate their honeymoon. Jake and Amy are then seen continuing their sexual roleplay, with Amy as Holly and Jake as Melvil Dewey. They eventually discover its hard to keep up with the characters and decide to just take their clothes off.

Back at the precinct, Rosa (Stephanie Beatriz) tries to ask Terry (Terry Crews) for advice on a drug case. However, Terry is distressed over taking over the precinct temporarily as he wanted to be a good leader, just like Holt. He attempts to find Holt's manual in order to be a good leader, but realizes that Holt had actually trusted him in making decisions after reading the manual. He gains confidence and proceeds to tell Rosa how to solve her drug case. Meanwhile, Charles (Joe Lo Truglio) attempts to find out from Gina (Chelsea Peretti) why their parents broke up. He tries to get Gina to investigate it with him, but she refuses to do so. Charles dons a mask with Gina's face on it and tries to unlock Gina's phone to find the truth, and finds out that Gina was the one who coerced her mother in to breaking up with Charles' dad. Gina later reveals it was because her mother was cheating on his father, and the reason she did not want to disclose it initially was because she did not want to hurt his feelings.

Jake and Amy come back from their honeymoon to learn that Holt had publicly rebelled against John Kelly's initiative, and as a form of retaliation, John Kelly has moved the entire precinct into the bullpen. Jake and Amy stare in surprise as they watch the overcrowded bullpen going about their business.

== Reception ==
=== Viewers ===
In its original American broadcast, "Honeymoon" was seen by an estimated 3.54 million household viewers and gained a 1.2/5 share among adults aged 18–49, according to Nielsen Media Research. This was almost a 97.8% increase from the previous episode, which was watched by 1.79 million viewers with a 0.8/3 in the 18-49 demographics. This means that 1.2 percent of all households with televisions watched the episode, while 5 percent of all households watching television at that time watched it. With these ratings, Brooklyn Nine-Nine was the third highest rated show on NBC for the night, beating The Good Place but behind Law & Order: SVU and The Titan Games, third on its timeslot and seventh for the night, behind The Big Bang Theory Young Sheldon, Mom, Fam and The Titan Games.

=== Critical reviews ===
"Honeymoon" received positive reviews from critics. LaToya Ferguson of The A.V. Club gave the episode an "A" grade and wrote, "As a season premiere, 'Honeymoon' is exactly the episode you want to start things off on the right foot for Brooklyn Nine-Nine. But the same is also true for its role as a coming out party for Brooklyn Nine-Nine on NBC. It’s not that 'Honeymoon' is the best episode of Brooklyn Nine-Nine, but not only does it impressively accomplish everything it needs to do in one fell swoop, it also does so while keeping the humor level up and setting up for some interesting dynamics moving forward. In that case, it is absolutely exemplary."

Kathryn VanArendonk of Vulture wrote, "It’s easy to forget because Brooklyn Nine-Nine does its job so well, but this is a fundamentally an escapist show. In its sixth season, though, it’s trying to be that without forgetting that it’s also set inside an arm of the government meant to enforce a fundamentally unjust status quo, at a time when the status quo seems to be on the verge of catastrophic collapse. That balancing act is no mean feat."

Alan Sepinwall of Rolling Stone wrote that the episode is a "very promising start to the new era, mainly by being a lot like the old one. What did everybody else think?", but calls the subplots of the episode a "mixed bag".
