= White Whale (Brooklyn Nine-Nine) =

- Brooklyn Nine-Nine episode
- Episode no.: Season 5 Episode 21
- Directed by: Matthew Nodella
- Written by: Matt Lawton; Carol Kolb
- Cinematography by: Giovani Lampassi
- Editing by: Jason Gill
- Production code: 521
- Original air date: May 13, 2018
- Running time: 21 minutes

Guest appearances
- Allison Tolman as Olivia Crawford; Carol Herman as Eunice

Episode chronology
← Previous "Show Me Going"	Next → "Jake & Amy"
- Brooklyn Nine-Nine season 5

"White Whale" is the 21st episode of the fifth season of the American television police sitcom series Brooklyn Nine-Nine, and the 111th overall episode of the series. The episode was written by Matt Lawton & Carol Kolb and directed by Matthew Nodella. It aired on Fox in the United States on May 13, 2018. The episode features guest appearances from Allison Tolman and Carol Herman.

The show revolves around the fictitious 99th precinct of the New York Police Department in Brooklyn and the officers and detectives that work in the precinct. In the episode, Rosa and Amy team up to take down their "white whale" suspect, a ruthless killer who has managed to elude them for seven years. Terry helps Jake tackle his wedding planning chores. Elsewhere, Captain Holt and his rival, Olivia Crawford, try to convince each other to step down in the campaign for Commissioner.

According to Nielsen Media Research, the episode was seen by an estimated 1.75 million household viewers and gained a 0.8/3 ratings share among adults aged 18–49. The episode received very positive reviews from critics, who praised the cast performances, writing and build-up to the season finale.

== Plot ==
Amy (Melissa Fumero) and Rosa (Stephanie Beatriz) find that their "white whale" suspect - a ruthless killer who has managed to elude them for seven years - has been spotted around the city and set to finally catch him. Before leaving, Amy leaves Jake (Andy Samberg) a list of chores he has to tackle before the wedding.

Amy and Rosa interrogate the killer's grandmother in an elderly home but find no information. Then, Amy reveals to Rosa that she accidentally let the killer escape when she inspected another part of the building they were inspecting, upsetting Rosa. While heading out, a woman tells them the killer is in the home and they return to catch him. Amy tries to mend her mistake and jumps off a balcony pursuing the killer, injuring her knee. Rosa explains to Amy that it's normal to make mistakes and she was angry because she lied to her, not for letting him go. They finally catch the killer at his accomplice's home (who was hiding as an orderly) and arrest him.

Meanwhile, Jake has trouble tackling the chores so he asks Terry (Terry Crews) for help. Terry helps him with a few chores but soon finds that due to Jake's over-confidence, he's already over-budget with the wedding before the chores are done. Jake is able to stay within their budget by opting for a cheaper wine package and asking Hitchcock (Dirk Blocker) and Scully (Joel McKinnon Miller) for help packing goody bags in exchange for candy almonds. The group manages to finish everything on the list but Jake accidentally locks Terry's keys inside Terry's minivan as they're preparing to transport the stuff for the wedding to the venue. Jake starts to panic about the keys locked in the car being a sign of a disaster-filled marriage with Amy, but Terry calms him down by saying that his love for Amy won't lead to that. Jake realizes that he would do anything for Amy because of his love for her and proceeds to break the window of Terry's minivan with a rock to get the keys out, and breaking a second window as a part of his adrenaline-filled proclamation.

Also, Holt (Andre Braugher) and Crawford (Allison Tolman) find that the other candidate for Commissioner has a 50% approbation and as such, one of them has to quit the candidacy. After the two argue for the other to withdraw, and Holt rejecting Gina (Chelsea Peretti) and Boyle's (Joe Lo Truglio) idea to spread false rumors about Crawford, Holt decides to submit a letter withdrawing from the commissioner's list but finds that Crawford withdrew as well, forcing Holt, Boyle, Gina, and Crawford to break into 1PP to retrieve the letter. Crawford finds Holt's letter and destroys it but reveals that she sent her withdrawal via e-mail, leaving Holt and John Kelly as the only two remaining candidates.

== Reception ==
=== Viewers ===
In its original American broadcast, "White Whale" was seen by an estimated 1.75 million household viewers and gained a 0.8/3 ratings share among adults aged 18–49, according to Nielsen Media Research. This was 4% increase in viewership from the previous episode, which was watched by 1.67 million viewers with a 0.7/3 in the 18-49 demographics. This means that 0.8 percent of all households with televisions watched the episode, while 3 percent of all households watching television at that time watched it. With these ratings, Brooklyn Nine-Nine was the fourth highest rated show on FOX for the night, behind Bob's Burgers, The Simpsons and Family Guy, fourth on its timeslot and ninth for the night, behind Bob's Burgers, NCIS: Los Angeles, two episodes of 60 Minutes, The Simpsons, Family Guy, America's Funniest Home Videos, and American Idol.

=== Critical reviews ===
"White Whale" received very positive reviews from critics. LaToya Ferguson of The A.V. Club gave the episode an "A−" grade and wrote, "While 'White Whale' may not have the same Very Special Episode vibes of 'Show Me Going,' it's still important in its own way, highlighting the (very funny) support system that is the Nine-Nine. While Gina and Boyle aren't all that helpful with their whisper campaign idea — which is honestly their only idea — the point is still that they're very concerned with helping at all. Even Scully and Hitchcock, while they were bribed to help — and really, it was more like fuel than a bribe — they still helped where they could. 'White Whale' being the first episode to air after Brooklyn Nine-Nine's brush with death feels necessary, as it highlights the strength of these characters when they work together. Now we just have to see how it all ends... for the season."

Alan Sepinwall of Uproxx wrote, "So when I watched this episode, it wasn't with the idea that this could have been the next-to-last episode I'd ever see of this wonderful comedy. It didn't have to carry the weight of me wondering if this would be the last joke about Hitchcock's inappropriate sexual behavior (or, in the case of him wandering around with his penis out, just careless personal grooming), or if I'd feel disappointed that Jake wasn't working one more case before getting married in what may now be the series finale. I was just able to enjoy it for what it was: a fun and nimble episode of a show that's too good to go away just yet, dammit, and now thankfully won't."
