= Thomas Judy =

American politician

Thomas Judy (December 19, 1804 – October 4, 1879) was an American politician.

The son of Samuel Judy, Judy lived in Edwardsville, Illinois. Thomas Judy served in the Illinois House of Representatives in 1852–1853.
