= List of Brooklyn Nine-Nine characters =

Brooklyn Nine-Nine is an American sitcom which premiered in September 2013 on Fox, and later moved to NBC. The show revolves around the detective squad of the fictional 99th Precinct of the New York Police Department, located in Brooklyn.

== Cast ==
=== Main ===
| Character | Actor | Seasons | | | | | | | |
| Character | Actor | 1 | 2 | 3 | 4 | 5 | 6 | 7 | 8 |
|---|---|---|---|---|---|---|---|---|---|
| Jake Peralta | Andy Samberg | Main | Main | Main | Main | Main | Main | Main | Main |
| Rosa Diaz | Stephanie Beatriz | Main | Main | Main | Main | Main | Main | Main | Main |
| Terry Jeffords | Terry Crews | Main | Main | Main | Main | Main | Main | Main | Main |
| Amy Santiago | Melissa Fumero | Main | Main | Main | Main | Main | Main | Main | Main |
| Charles Boyle | Joe Lo Truglio | Main | Main | Main | Main | Main | Main | Main | Main |
| Gina Linetti | Chelsea Peretti | Main (Note: Chelsea Peretti does not appear in the first nine episodes of season 5 due to her maternity leave. She returns in 5x10 and is credited as a series regular through 6x04. She is credited as a special guest star in 6x15.) | Main | Main | Main | Main | Main | | Guest |
| Raymond Holt | Andre Braugher | Main | Main | Main | Main | Main | Main | Main | Main |
| Michael Hitchcock | Dirk Blocker | Recurring | Starring | Starring | Starring | Starring | Main (Note: Promoted to the main cast in 6x05.) | Main | Main |
| Norm Scully | Joel McKinnon Miller | Recurring | Starring | Starring | Starring | Starring | Main | Main | Main |

=== Supporting ===
| Character | Actor | Seasons | | | | | | | |
| Character | Actor | 1 | 2 | 3 | 4 | 5 | 6 | 7 | 8 |
|---|---|---|---|---|---|---|---|---|---|
| Mlepclaynos | Fred Armisen | Recurring | | | | Guest | | | Guest |
| Captain McGintley | Mike Hagerty | Recurring | | | | Guest | | | |
| Deputy Commissioner Podolski | James M. Connor | Recurring | | | | | | | |
| Keith "The Vulture" Pembroke | Dean Winters | Recurring | | Recurring | | Guest | Guest | | |
| Zeke | Jamal Duff | Guest | Guest | Guest | | | | | |
| Fire Marshal Boone | Patton Oswalt | Recurring | | | | | | | |
| Hank | Kevin Dorff | Guest | Recurring | | Guest | Guest | Guest | | |
| Doug Judy | Craig Robinson | Guest | Guest | Guest | Guest | Guest | Guest | Guest | Guest |
| Sharon Jeffords | Merrin Dungey | Guest | Guest | Recurring | | | | | |
| Vivian Ludley | Marilu Henner | Recurring | | | | | | | |
| Kevin Cozner | Marc Evan Jackson | Guest | Recurring | Guest | Guest | Recurring | Recurring | Guest | Recurring |
| Detective Lohank | Matt Walsh | Guest | | Guest | Guest | | | | |
| Teddy Wells | Kyle Bornheimer | Recurring | Recurring | | Guest | Guest | | Guest | Guest |
| Chief Madeline Wuntch | Kyra Sedgwick | | Recurring | Recurring | | | Guest | Guest | |
| Sophia Perez | Eva Longoria | | Recurring | | | | | | |
| Lynn Boyle | Stephen Root | | Recurring | | | | | | |
| Darlene Linetti | Sandra Bernhard | | Recurring | | | | | | |
| Marcus | Nick Cannon | | Recurring | Guest | | | | | |
| Geoffrey Hoytsman | Chris Parnell | | Recurring | | | | | | |
| Roger Peralta | Bradley Whitford | | Guest | Guest | | Guest | | Guest | |
| Oliver Cox | Gabe Liedman | | Guest | Guest | | | Recurring | | |
| Genevieve Mirren-Carter | Mary Lynn Rajskub | | | Recurring | Guest | | | | |
| Adrian Pimento | Jason Mantzoukas | | | Recurring | Recurring | Recurring | | Guest | Guest |
| Maura Figgis | Aida Turturro | | | Recurring | | | | | |
| Bob Annderson | Dennis Haysbert | | | Recurring | | | | | |
| Karen Haas | Maya Rudolph | | | | Recurring | | | | |
| Jason "C.J." Stentley | Ken Marino | | | | Recurring | | Guest | | |
| Sheriff Reynolds | Jim O'Heir | | | | Recurring | | | | |
| Nikolaj Boyle | Antonio Raul Corbo | | | | Recurring | | Recurring | Guest | |
| Bill Hummertrout | Winston Story | | | | Guest | Recurring | Guest | Guest | Guest |
| Veronica Hopkins | Kimberly Hébert Gregory | | | | Recurring | | | | |
| Melanie Hawkins | Gina Gershon | | | | Recurring | Guest | | | |
| Caleb John Gosche | Tim Meadows | | | | | Recurring | Guest | | Guest |
| Jeff Romero | Lou Diamond Phillips | | | | | Recurring | | | |
| Warden Granville | Toby Huss | | | | | Recurring | | | |
| Seamus Murphy | Paul Adelstein | | | | | Recurring | | | |
| Olivia Crawford | Allison Tolman | | | | | Recurring | | | |
| Trudy Judy | Nicole Byer | | | | | | Guest | Guest | Guest |
| John Kelly | Phil Reeves | | | | | | Recurring | | |
| Jocelyn Pryce | Cameron Esposito | | | | | | Recurring | | |
| Debbie Fogle | Vanessa Bayer | | | | | | | Recurring | |
| Frank O'Sullivan | John C. McGinley | | | | | | | | Recurring |

== Main characters ==
=== Jake Peralta ===
Jake Peralta
- Brooklyn Nine-Nine character
- First appearance: "Pilot"
- Created by: Michael Schur; Dan Goor
- Portrayed by: Andy Samberg; Miles Platt (child); Benjamin Steinberg (teenager)

In-universe information
- Full name: Jacob Jeffrey/Sherlock Peralta
- Aliases: Carl Mangerman; Larry Sherbert (WITSEC alias); Various undercover identities
- Nicknames: Girl (Gina), Jake Hammer, Jake Rabbit (Charles), Jp (Terrence), Jake, Jakey, Jakester, Peralta, Babe, Beef Baby, The Tattler (high school)
- Gender: Male
- Title: Detective
- Occupation: Detective (seasons 1–8); Stay-at-home father (season 8); Funzone Assistant Manager (season 4)
- Spouse: Amy Santiago
- Significant others: Dr. Rossi (ex-lover); Jenny Gildenhorn (childhood love interest); Sophia Perez (ex-girlfriend)
- Children: McClane “Mac” Peralta-Santiago (son)
- Relatives: Roger Peralta (father); Karen Peralta (mother); Walter Peralta (grandfather); Kate Peralta (half-sister); Two unnamed half sisters; An unknown number of half brothers; One unnamed uncle
- Nationality: Jewish American

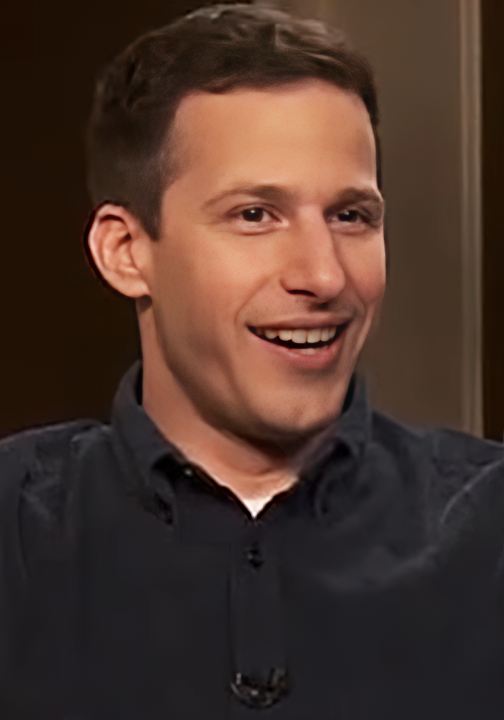
Andy Samberg

Andy Samberg portrays Jacob "Jake" Jeffrey Peralta, the series's protagonist. At the beginning of the series, Peralta is portrayed as an exceptional detective despite his immaturity, engaging in pranks and making childish jokes at the expense of his colleagues. He is fun-loving, sarcastic, and is often motivated by his emotions. Despite his goofiness, Peralta is smart, perceptive, and quick thinking, and as such has the best arrest rate in the precinct. In the pilot, Terry Jeffords explains to Captain Holt that Peralta is his best detective.

Jake's father, Roger Peralta, an airline pilot, abandoned the family during Jake's childhood. Jake initially refuses to celebrate Thanksgiving, since he associates the holiday with his father's absence. After Jake calls his father out for his irresponsible parenting in "Captain Peralta", the two slowly began to mend their relationship. In the season 5 episode "Two Turkeys", Jake finds out he has three half-sisters, along with an unknown number of half-brothers. He meets one of his half-sisters, Kate, in the episode "DFW". He mentions being half Jewish and half Italian in the show.

Jake began his career as a patrol officer with the 74th Precinct and was partnered with Stevie Schillens; the two nicknamed themselves the "Beatsie Boys". He was promoted to detective with the 99th Precinct in 2005. He has a strong emotional tie to his muscle car, a 1967 Ford Mustang, which he buys outright on his first day as a cop. He often quotes and makes references to Die Hard and the Teenage Mutant Ninja Turtles. In "The Bet", it is revealed that Jake is Jewish.

Jake's best friend is co-worker Charles Boyle, who encourages his eventual romance with Amy Santiago. Jake and Gina are childhood friends, while he and Rosa Diaz were classmates at the police academy.

While Jake initially struggles with Captain Holt's strict management style, he matures under Holt's supervision and comes to see the captain as a father figure. In "The Oolong Slayer", Jake achieves his lifelong dream to catch a serial killer, but gives credit for the arrest to the Chief of Brooklyn Detectives in exchange for Holt's transfer back to the 99th Precinct. In season five, Holt puts his career at risk by negotiating with mobster Seamus Murphy in order to free Jake and Rosa from prison. The two also work closely together to bring down Jimmy Figgis after being forced to go into witness protection in Florida.

Peralta continuously pranks and teases his partner Amy Santiago, masking his secret romantic feelings for her. Peralta confessed his feelings to her in "Charges and Specs" before going undercover for a mafia operation. His romantic feelings for her developed further throughout season two and they shared their first kiss in the season finale, "Johnny and Dora". Jake and Amy start dating in "New Captain" and decided to move in together in "Greg and Larry", but don't make it official until season four's "The Fugitive". Jake proposed to Amy at the end of their annual Halloween heist in "HalloVeen" and the two are later married by Captain Holt in the season five finale. In season 7, Amy became pregnant with their child. Their son McClane "Mac" Santiago-Peralta (who was named after John McClane from Die Hard) is born in the season 7 finale.

In the series finale, with Amy's new position taking up more of her time and making their parenting schedule difficult, Jake decides to quit his job to become a stay-at-home dad, not wanting his son to grow up without a father as he did. Jake is the only character, along with Captain Holt, to appear in every episode of the series.

==== Awards and decorations ====
The following are the medals and service awards fictionally worn by Peralta.

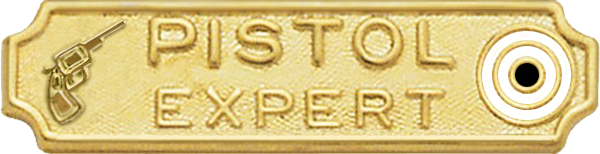
| American Flag Breast Bar |
| NYPD Commendation—Integrity |
| NYPD Excellent Police Duty |
| NYPD Award of Merit |
| Police Gallantry Citation |
| NYPD 150th Commemorative Breast Bar |
| NYPD Firearms Proficiency Bar |

While his commendations are not specifically covered in the series, in the episode "Stakeout", he received a commendation for his work on Rosa's drug task force.

=== Rosa Diaz ===
Rosa Diaz
- First appearance: "Pilot"
- Created by: Dan Goor; Michael Schur
- Portrayed by: Stephanie Beatriz

In-universe information
- Full name: Rosalita Diaz
- Alias: Emily Goldfinch
- Nicknames: Rosie, Ro Ro (Charles)
- Gender: Female
- Occupation: Detective (seasons 1–7); Private Investigator (season 8)
- Significant others: Jocelyn Pryce (ex-girlfriend); Alicia (ex-girlfriend); Adrian Pimento (ex-fiancé); Marcus (ex-boyfriend); Tom (ex-boyfriend); "Becky" (ex-girlfriend); "Tiffany" (ex-girlfriend); Aubrey (ex-lover)
- Relatives: Oscar Diaz (father); Julia Diaz (mother); Diana (niece); Two unnamed sisters
- Nationality: Mexican-American

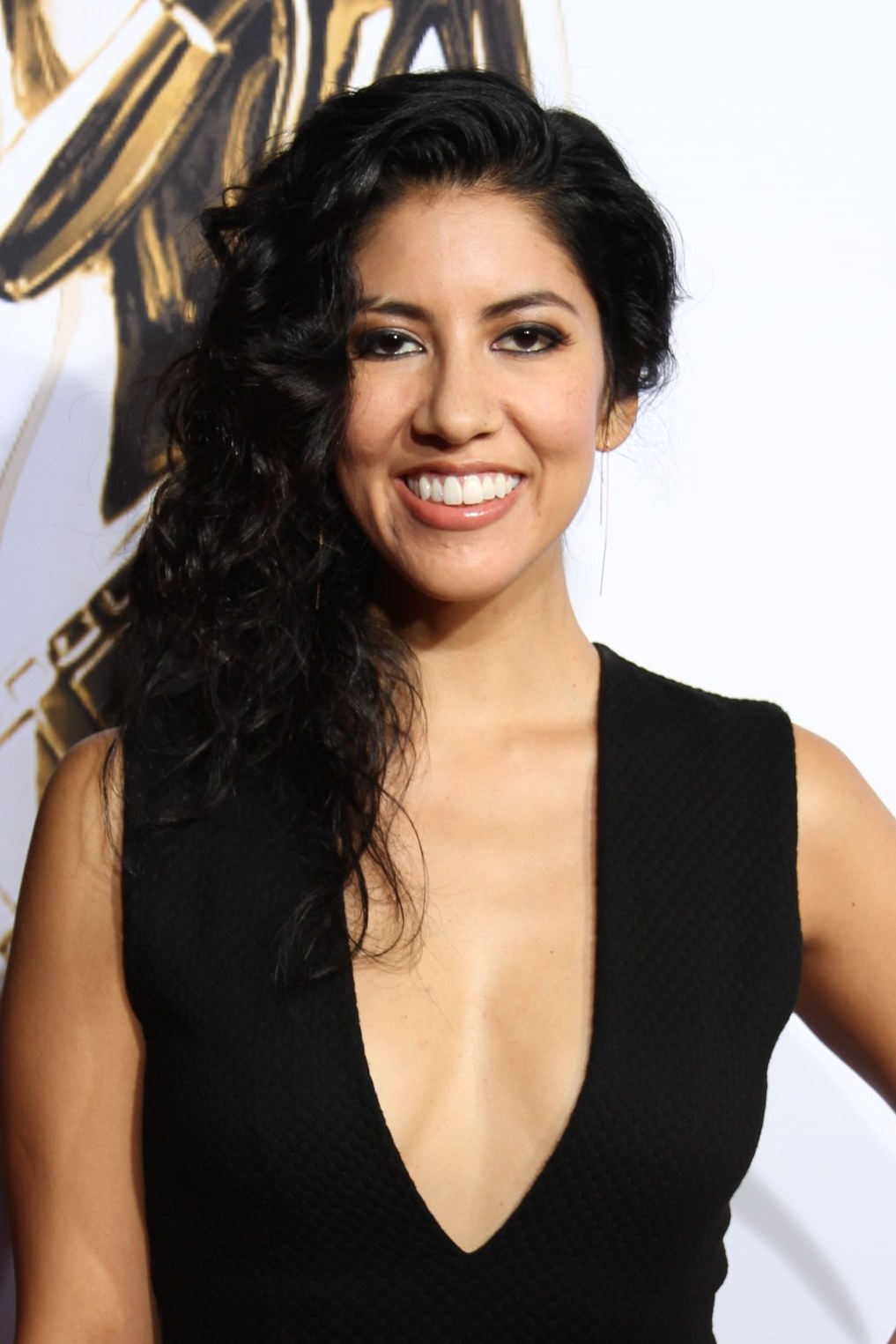
Stephanie Beatriz

Stephanie Beatriz portrays Rosalita "Rosa" Diaz, a smart, tough, and enigmatic detective. Implied to have had a relatively stable and loving childhood, she attended parochial school before transferring to a prestigious ballet school; the pressure on her to succeed there drove her to commit several underage crimes (including home invasion and "beating up ballerinas"), which resulted in her expulsion from ballet school and landing in juvenile detention. In response, her parents effectively cut her dead, leaving Rosa to rebuild her life alone; this convinced her that she should not expect support from her loved ones, leading her to become obsessed with self-sufficiency and privacy and to avoid emotional investment in the lives of others.

Though Rosa is a loyal and effective member of the squad, her anger management issues and lack of compassion for others terrify most of her coworkers. If Rosa is angry enough, they will not even walk past her to go to the bathroom, something Terry and Holt briefly attempt to use to increase precinct efficiency. She is highly secretive about her personal life and information about her is contradictory; it is established that she does not stay in any accommodation for long periods of time and her neighbors know her by not only a different name but a different personality. In the episode "Greg and Larry", Rosa even suggests that her real identity is hidden from the squad itself. As revealed in "Cop-Con", she and Amy are younger than most of the other precinct members as they are hurt by a device that emits a loud noise to those under 35, whereas Jake and Boyle only pretended to be affected by it.

Alongside her proficiency at ballet, at some point Rosa became an accomplished gymnast (which she considers her "deepest shame") and is also highly skilled at yoga and archery. In "White Whale", she tells Amy that she attended both medical school and business school and has a pilot's license. In her spare time, she restores old cars to sell to famous people and has an online business selling homemade jewellery (for which she uses bolt cutters). She is also a dedicated motorcyclist, showing a marked expertise in the riding, care and knowledge of motorbikes.

In Season 2, Rosa dates Captain Holt's nephew Marcus, but breaks up with him due to not being ready for marriage. She later finds love with former undercover detective Adrian Pimento; things move very swiftly, with the two getting engaged in "Paranoia" while chasing a drug dealer through an alley, but their wedding is delayed when Pimento goes off-grid to escape the wrath of mob boss Jimmy Figgis. Once he returns, they agree to marry within twenty-four hours, but decide to slow down after realizing they are rushing their renewed relationship.

At the end of Season 4, Rosa and Jake are framed by their idol Lt. Melanie Hawkins and declared guilty of armed robbery and grand larceny. After several months in prison prior to the start of Season 5, the two are freed thanks to the precinct exposing Hawkins's crimes. Her experience prompts her to reconnect with her family, becoming close with them again, and to end things with Pimento. While on the road trip home from their former captain's funeral, Charles overhears a woman calling her "babe" over the phone, leading Rosa to admit she is bisexual; she subsequently comes out officially to the precinct and her parents, the latter of whom reacts poorly, fracturing their bond once again. However, her father subsequently affirms that he accepts her, but reveals that her mother is not at this stage yet. After several months of waiting for her to initiate a meeting, Rosa eventually reaches out herself; her mother is clearly grateful and they go on to repair their relationship. After coming out, Rosa has several relationships with other women over the course of the series, including an unseen woman that the squad nicknamed "Becky"; a friend of Gina's; a cab driver named Alicia; a woman Charles nicknames "Couscous"; and a cosmetologist named Jocelyn Pryce. In the episode "Valloweaster," she becomes the first three-time Halloween Heist Champion.

In season eight, Rosa leaves the NYPD after losing faith in the system following the George Floyd protests, becoming a private investigator. By the series finale, she is not in a serious relationship nor does she have children, but she makes it clear she is happy where she is in life.

Rosa appeared in every episode of the series but two: "Coral Palms: Part One" and "The Box".

==== Awards and decorations ====
The following are the medals and service awards fictionally worn by Diaz.

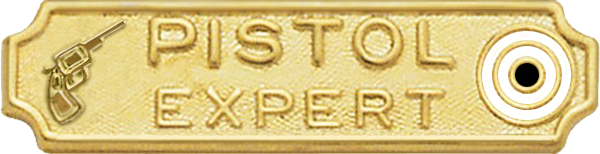
| American Flag Breast Bar |
| NYPD Excellent Police Duty |
| NYPD Firearms Proficiency Bar |

While her commendations are not specifically covered in the series, in the episode "Stakeout", she received a commendation for her work as the leader of a drug Task Force.

=== Terry Jeffords ===
Terry Jeffords
- First appearance: "Pilot"
- Created by: Dan Goor; Michael Schur
- Based on: Terry Crews
- Portrayed by: Terry Crews; Theodore Barnes (child)

In-universe information
- Full name: Terrence Vincent Jeffords
- Gender: Male
- Occupation: Sergeant (seasons 1–6); Lieutenant (seasons 6–8); Captain (season 8)
- Spouse: Sharon Jeffords (wife)
- Significant others: Chiaki (ex-girlfriend); Veronica Hopkins (ex-girlfriend)
- Children: Cagney Jeffords (daughter); Lacey Jeffords (daughter); Ava Jeffords (daughter)
- Relatives: Lawrence Jeffords (brother); Zeke (brother-in-law); Unnamed father (deceased); Unnamed grandmother (deceased)
- Nationality: American

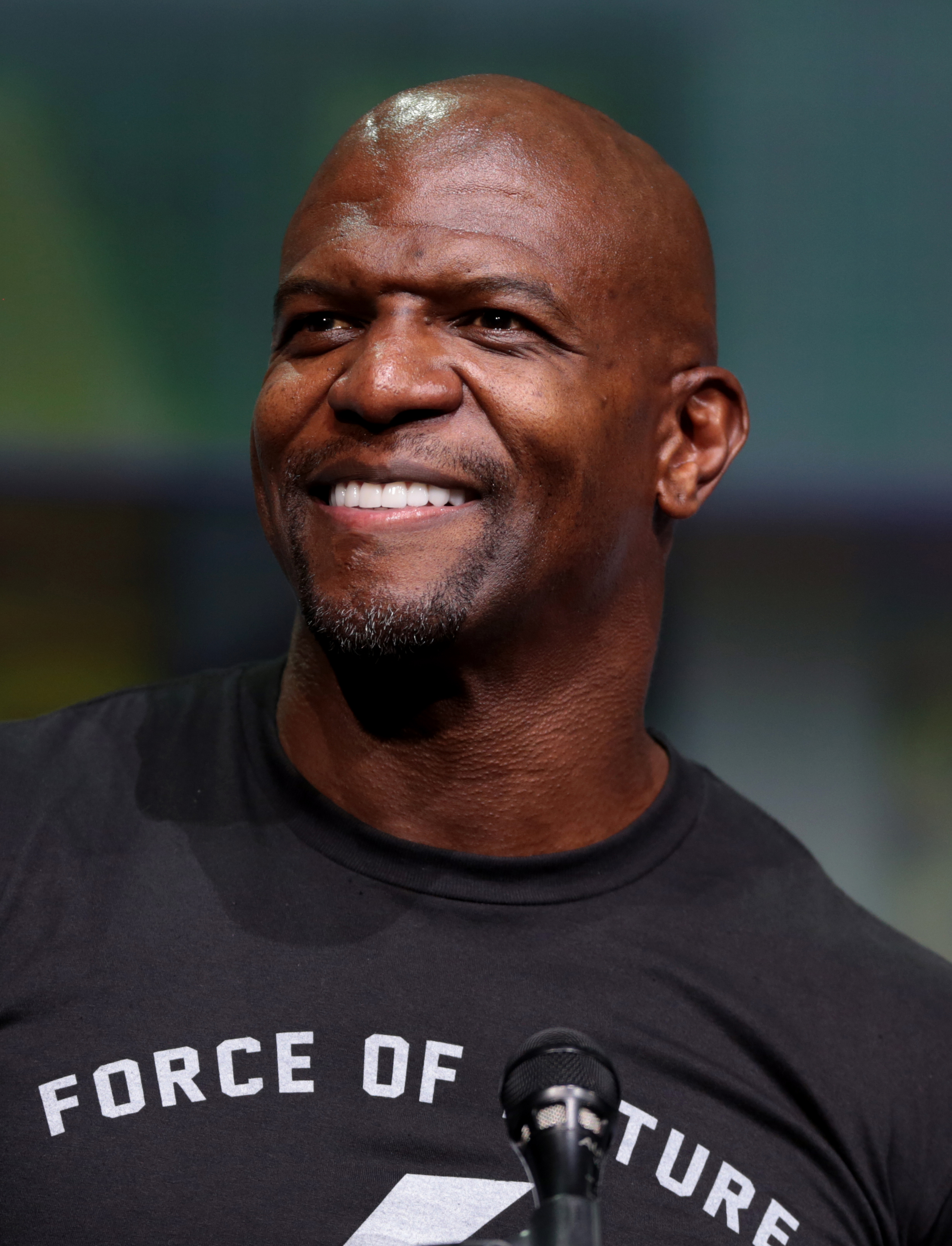
Terry Crews

Terrence Vincent "Terry" Jeffords, the supervisor of the 99th Precinct's detective squad, is based on and portrayed by Terry Crews. An avid bodybuilder, Terry's intimidating size and appearance are contrasted by his gentle-giant persona, being very caring and parental in nature. Jeffords is devoted to his wife and three young daughters, twins Cagney and Lacey, and Ava. He fears the danger of police work because of the possibility that he could leave his children fatherless. Following a panic attack prior to the show's beginning, Terry was removed from fieldwork, but returned after saving Holt's life. He is high-strung, prone to nervous excitement, loves yogurt, and has a tendency to refer to himself in the third person like "Terry loves yogurt". He is an effective and caring leader to the detective squad, often having to play the mature adult in order to keep them in line. Terry Jeffords is also known for being able to run through walls like the Kool-Aid Man but doesn't do it often as it makes him feel as so he is only respected for his muscles.

A running gag throughout the series is for Terry to break things because of his incredible strength. He has been a detective since 1995 and used to be assigned to the 65th Precinct, where he was constantly mocked for a botched case which he and Jake later proved he was correct in. He was a linebacker at Syracuse University, where he graduated magna cum laude, as revealed in "The Swedes". He also studied abroad in Japan while in college and dated a Japanese student named Chiaki who broke his heart.

In season two, Terry almost got a vasectomy at his wife's request, but Jake convinced him not to when he found out Terry secretly wanted to have more kids. His wife became pregnant later in the season and gave birth to their third daughter, Ava, in season three; Terry names Jake as Ava's godfather.

While Terry was satisfied with his role as a sergeant, he aimed to become a lieutenant during the first six seasons. As revealed in "The Honeypot", he brought a new pair of suspenders that he planned to put on after he passed the lieutenant's exam but kept them in the box when he ended up failing and held onto them as a reminder of his higher goals. In "Moo Moo", he attempted to apply to be a city council liaison to take on more responsibilities but was rejected after reporting that another cop racially profiled him. In season six, Terry revealed to the group that he secretly passed the lieutenant's exam weeks before an impromptu 'Cinco de Mayo' heist that the precinct decided to hold to take his mind off the exam. He was nearly transferred to Staten Island, but Acting Commissioner Wuntch used her new position to allow him to stay at the Nine-Nine, primarily by forcing Holt to fulfil a one-year street patrol requirement. In the series finale, after Holt was appointed as the deputy commissioner of the police reform program, Terry succeeded him as the new captain of the 99th Precinct.

Terry appeared in every episode of the series but two: "Coral Palms: Part One" and "The Box".

==== Awards and decorations ====
The following are the medals and service awards fictionally worn by Jeffords.

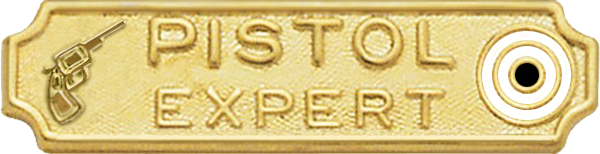
| American Flag Breast Bar |
| World Trade Center Breast Bar |
| NYPD Commendation—Integrity |
| NYPD Unit Citation |
| NYPD Firearms Proficiency Bar |

=== Amy Santiago ===
Amy Santiago
- First appearance: "Pilot"
- Created by: Dan Goor; Michael Schur
- Portrayed by: Melissa Fumero

In-universe information
- Alias: Isabel Cortez (undercover alias)
- Gender: Female
- Occupation: Detective (seasons 1–5); Sergeant (season 5–8); Chief of Police Reform (season 8)
- Spouse: Jake Peralta
- Significant others: Teddy Wells (ex-boyfriend); Constantine Kane (ex-boyfriend); Luke Mueller (ex-boyfriend)
- Children: McClane “Mac” Santiago-Peralta (son)
- Relatives: Victor Santiago (father); Camila Santiago (mother); Tony Santiago (brother); David Santiago (brother); Mason Santiago (nephew); Roger Peralta (father-in-law); Karen Peralta (mother-in-law); Kate Peralta (half sister-in-law); Five unnamed brothers; Two unnamed half sisters-in-law; An unknown number of half brothers-in-law; Unnamed niece
- Nationality: Cuban-American

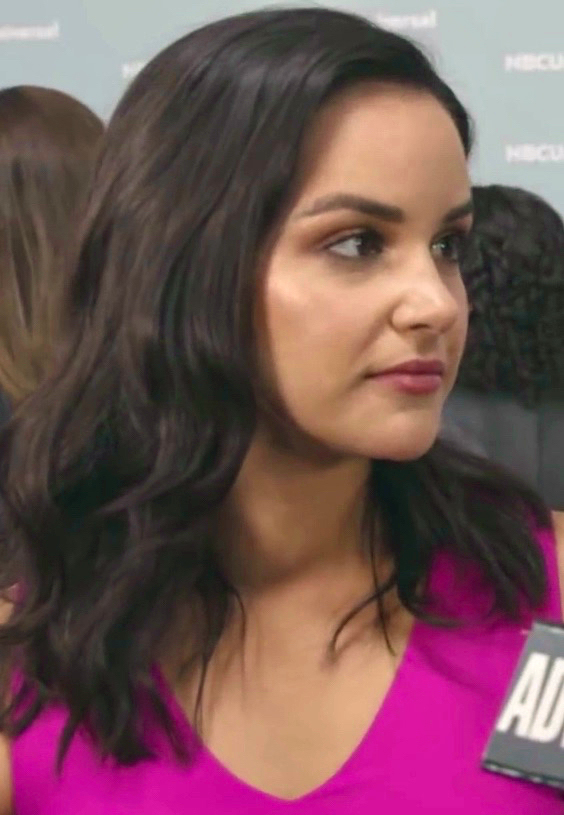
Melissa Fumero

Melissa Fumero portrays Amy Santiago, Jake's uptight, by-the-book, rule-following Cuban-American partner, and later wife. A self-acknowledged type A personality and neurotic overachiever, she continually tried to ingratiate herself with Holt, and any authority figure in arm's reach of her. In the pilot, Terry cites Amy's competitiveness to Holt as a result of her having seven brothers. Amy is a stickler for department protocol and is frequently exasperated by Jake's childishness, as well as the ease with which he succeeds as a detective. She was initially seen as Holt's teacher's pet, but over time is shown to command respect from others.

Amy was originally a patrol officer at the 64th precinct but requested a transfer to the 99th when her captain sexually harassed her shortly after her promotion to detective. She didn't tell anyone for years out of fear of what it would do to her career, until she revealed it to Jake when they were investigating a sexual assault case in "He Said, She Said".

In the season one finale, Jake confessed that he wished something romantic could happen between them. She admitted to having feelings for Jake in "The Road Trip", which instigated issues in her relationship with Teddy Wells. The two shared their first kiss in "Johnny and Dora" and begin dating in "New Captain," although their working relationship did not change at all. They decided to move in together in the season three finale "Greg and Larry", but do not do so until season four's "The Fugitive". Jake proposed to Amy at the end of their annual Halloween heist in "HalloVeen" and the two eventually married in "Jake & Amy". In season seven, Amy became pregnant with Jake's child and gave birth to their son, McClane 'Mac' Santiago-Peralta in the season finale.

Near the end of season three, Amy went undercover as a pregnant inmate in a women's prison in Texas. This was done to cover Melissa Fumero's actual pregnancy at the time without making her character pregnant. Amy's actual pregnancy in season seven occurred when Fumero was pregnant with her second child.

After some uncertainty in taking the sergeant's exam as depicted in "Chasing Amy", she passed the exam and began wearing her sergeant's uniform as well as commanding her own uniformed officers in "NutriBoom". In season eight, thanks to her efforts for the police reform program, Amy was promoted to become chief of the program. The additional responsibilities that came with her job ultimately led Jake to quit so they would not have to worry about Mac's parenting schedule.

In season six's "Casecation", she was revealed to be 36 years old. In "The Golden Child", it is revealed that Amy has a relatively strained relationship with her brother and fellow NYPD lieutenant David Santiago, and Jake later chided her mother for glorifying David's accomplishments over Amy's. Amy enjoys solving crosswords and attending trivia sessions, generally at Jake's expense, who often embarrasses himself when attempting to participate or becomes awkwardly excluded in conversation. She also has a severe allergy to dogs.

Amy appeared in every episode of the series but two: "Coral Palms: Part One" and "The Box".

==== Awards and decorations ====
The following are the medals and service awards fictionally worn by Santiago.

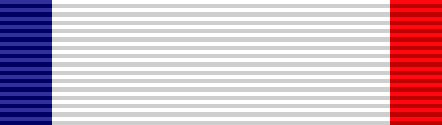
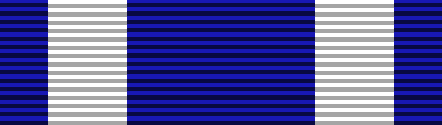
| American Flag Breast Bar |
| NYPD Excellent Police Duty |
| The Commendation—Community Service is awarded for An act which demonstrates devotion to Community service |
| Citation bar for delivering a baby |
| Los Angeles Police Star |
| Human Relations Medal |

=== Charles Boyle ===
Charles Boyle
- First appearance: "Pilot" (2013)
- Last appearance: "The Last Day" (2021)
- Created by: Dan Goor; Michael Schur
- Portrayed by: Joe Lo Truglio

In-universe information
- Gender: Male
- Occupation: Detective
- Spouse: Genevieve Mirren-Carter
- Significant others: Vivian Ludley (ex-fiancée); Gina Linetti (ex-lover); Lt. Singh (ex-lover); Various ex-girlfriends
- Children: Nikolaj Boyle (adopted son)
- Relatives: Lynn Boyle (Father); Darlene Linetti (stepmother); Gina Linetti (stepsister); Sam Boyle (step-cousin); Christina Boyle (step-cousin); Milton Boyle (step-cousin); The Enigma "Iggy" Boyle (niece); Unnamed mother; Unnamed sister; Unnamed father
- Nationality: American

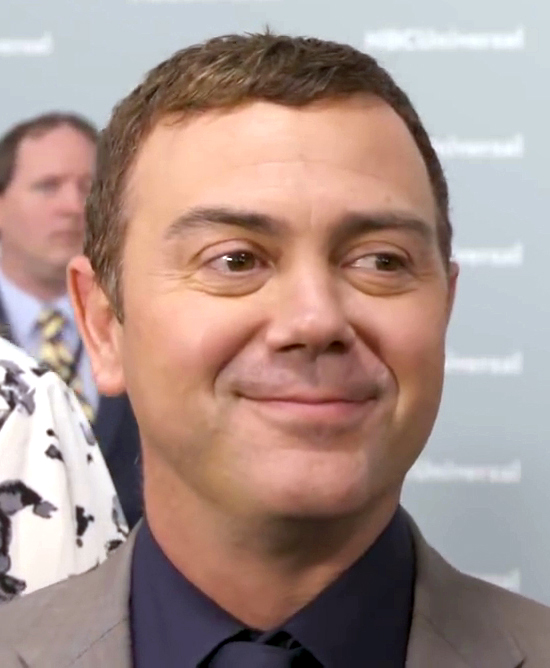
Joe Lo Truglio

Joe Lo Truglio portrays Charles Boyle, a nervous and clumsy but honest and hard-working detective. He is Jake's best friend, and almost completely idolizes him. He is divorced from his wife Eleanor, who had numerous affairs during their marriage, to the point where she has to pay alimony to him. He is also a huge, unapologetic foodie, maintaining a weekly Brooklyn pizza-ranking email and often relishing bizarre foreign cuisine that disgusts his coworkers.

For saving Diaz's life during "Christmas", during which he was shot in the buttocks, he was awarded the NYPD Medal for Valor in "The Bet", though he was overshadowed by a revered and heroic NYPD horse named Sergeant Peanut Butter. He continued to have a one-sided rivalry with Sergeant (later Lieutenant) Peanut Butter until he needed his help in getting Jake to the precinct in the season seven finale. In "The Swedes", it is revealed that Boyle is a graduate of Sarah Lawrence College. In season eight, Charles discovered that he is actually not a Boyle by blood as his mother had an affair with a florist who rivaled his father, but Lynn still raised him as a Boyle regardless. Despite this, he was declared as the "One True Boyle" after he was the only one to successfully open the grandmother sourdough starter jar at the family farm.

In the show's first season, Charles was smitten with Rosa, but he eventually got over her when he started dating Vivian Ludley, whom he met at Holt's birthday party. They get engaged but break up after Charles refused to move to Canada with her. He and Gina start engaging in casual sex in season two, and their brief relationship results in the marriage of his father and Gina's mother. In season three, he started dating Genevieve Mirren-Carter after he and Jake clear her name from an art theft. They eventually move in together and adopt a son from Latvia named Nikolaj.

In season five, Charles started his own food truck business called "The One Thing", which specialized in meatball subs. The truck was burned down by one of Charles' former employees, but he was thankful it happened as running the food truck meant he was spending less time with his family and also building up a large debt. Outside of Hitchcock and Scully, Charles is the only detective not to quit or change ranks by the end of the series. With Jake quitting his job in the series finale, Charles became the new senior detective of the precinct, and his new partner Detective Larkin idolizes him similar to how he idolized Jake.

Charles has a habit of saying things that are overtly sexualized or otherwise inappropriate and rarely realizes it, despite the rest of the squad's disgust. He has appeared in every episode of the series except the season four opener "Coral Palms: Part One".

==== Awards and decorations ====
The following are the medals and service awards fictionally worn by Boyle.

| American Flag Breast Bar |
| NYPD Medal for Valor |
| Honorable mention/Distinguished Service Duty Citation Bar |
| Unidentified award |
| NYPD 150th Commemorative Breast Bar |

=== Gina Linetti ===
Gina Linetti
- First appearance: "Pilot" (2013)
- Last appearance: "The Last Day" (2021)
- Created by: Dan Goor; Michael Schur
- Portrayed by: Chelsea Peretti

In-universe information
- Full name: Regina Linetti
- Gender: Female
- Occupation: Administrator (Seasons 1–6); Internet personality (Season 6–8)
- Significant others: Charles Boyle (ex-lover); Milton Boyle (lover, father of her child); Eight unnamed ex-fiancés
- Children: The Enigma "Iggy" Boyle (daughter)
- Relatives: Darlene Linetti (mother); Lynn Boyle (stepfather); Charles Boyle (stepbrother); Susan Grapecoat (great-aunt); Anthony (nephew); Unnamed sibling; Unnamed father
- Nationality: Italian-American

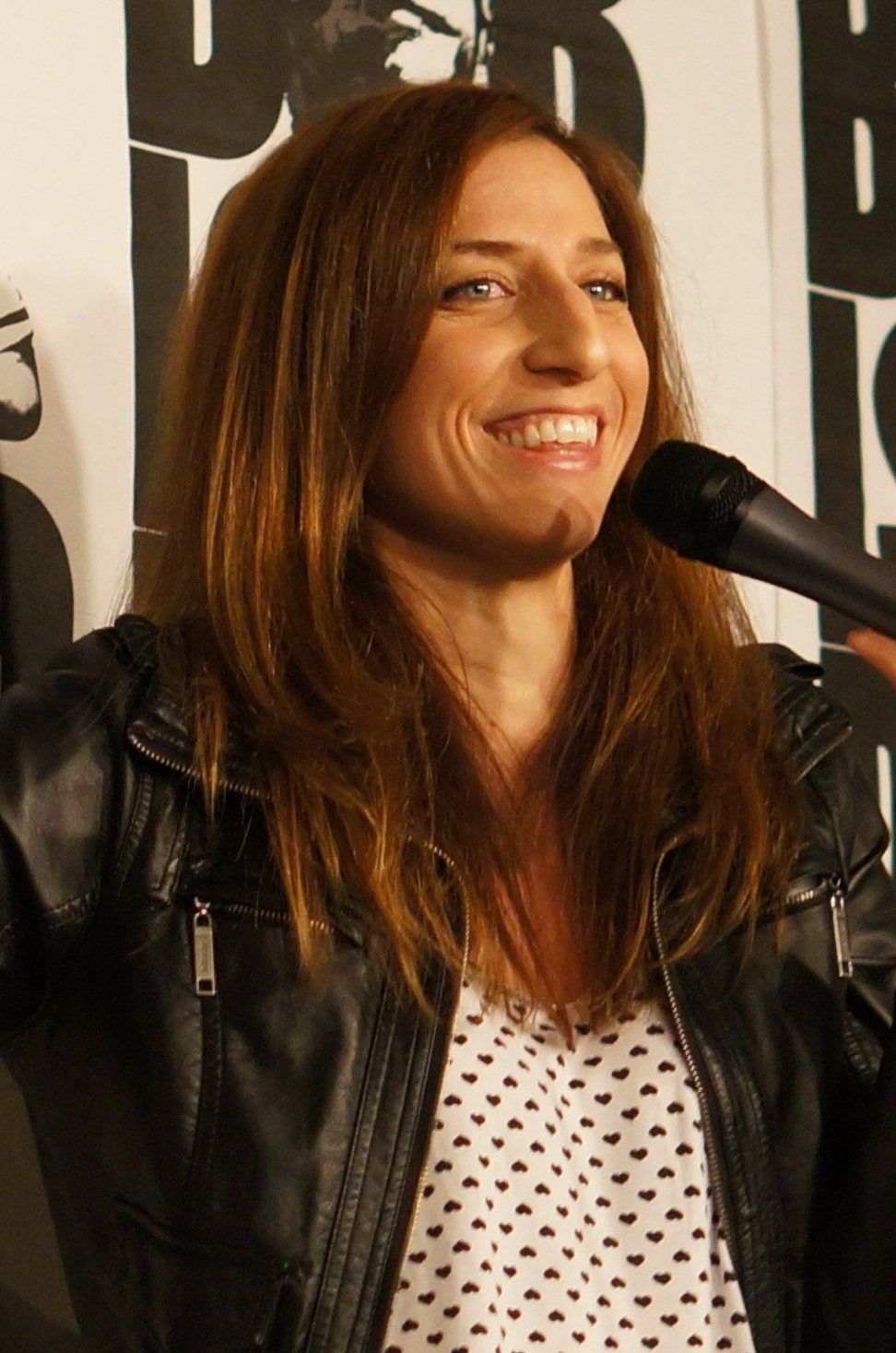
Chelsea Peretti

Chelsea Peretti portrays Regina "Gina" Linetti, the 99th Precinct's sardonic and egomaniacal civilian administrator and Holt's assistant. Despite maintaining a clueless and dimwitted disposition most of the time, she can be surprisingly observant and often demonstrates signs of being more intelligent than she likes to show. As the only civilian in the precinct, Gina often uses her outsider's perspective to assist the other detectives.

Gina is obsessed with social media and is constantly on her phone. It is a running gag to try to pry her from her phone to the point where Holt becomes involved. She is extremely narcissistic and constantly praises and exalts herself, such as claiming to be a better dancer than Britney Spears in the episode "Karen Peralta". In "The Party", to prevent the mostly working class detectives from embarrassing themselves in front of a crowd of academics, Rosa tricks Gina into talking to a group of psychology professors at Holt's birthday party, who then took copious notes about her narcissistic personality. They concluded that she has a complete overlap of ego and id, a condition previously thought to be purely theoretical. The episode also reveals Gina to be a kleptomaniac.

She casually admits on myriad occasions that she doesn't value her colleagues – except for Jake – as people. She was also childhood friends with Jake, who got her the job at the precinct. Gina also ruined Jake's senior year of high school by framing him as "the Tattler", though she did it to protect Jake from getting involved with the wrong crowd. She transferred to the Public relations Division with Holt in "Johnny and Dora", and returned to the 99th Precinct with him in "The Oolong Slayer". In the episode "The Apartment", it is revealed that she has been engaged eight times, but never married.

In "The Fugitive Pt. 2", she declared that Charles' texts are so strange that she would rather get hit by a bus than receive another one from him. At the end of the episode, she received Charles' first unchecked, quality text for her, but while congratulating him, she ironically does indeed get hit by a bus and spends the next few episodes recovering from the incident. The penultimate episode of season four revealed she became pregnant following a relationship with Charles' cousin, Milton (which coincided with Chelsea Peretti's actual pregnancy). She was absent for the first half of season five on maternity leave after giving birth to a girl she nicknames "Iggy" (short for The Enigma).

In the episode "Halloween IV", Gina revealed that in the fourth grade at a classmate's birthday party, a bowling ball fell onto her face. This incident knocked out her two front teeth; she has been wearing false teeth since.

In season six, Jake helps Gina realize that her talents would be better spent elsewhere and she quits her job. She becomes an internet celebrity and hosts a web show called "The G-Hive," in which she gives her viewers life advice. Her work has made her too busy to spend time with her former coworkers, but she is aiming to improve after Jake confronted her for not talking to them for months. In the series finale, Gina appears to have become wealthy from her new job to the point where she can afford an armored truck with "The G-Hive" logo on it.

=== Raymond Holt ===
Raymond Holt
- First appearance: "Pilot"
- Created by: Dan Goor; Michael Schur
- Portrayed by: Andre Braugher; Seth Carr (child)

In-universe information
- Full name: Raymond Jacob Holt
- Alias: Greg Stickney (WITSEC alias)
- Gender: Male
- Occupation: Commanding Officer, NYPD 99th Precinct (seasons 1–6; season 7–8) Head of NYPD public relations (season 3); Patrol officer (season 6–7); Deputy Commissioner of Police Reform (season 8)
- Spouse: Kevin Cozner
- Significant other: Frederick (ex-boyfriend)
- Relatives: Laverne Holt (mother); Unnamed father (deceased); Debbie (sister); Marcus (nephew) Geoffrey Holt (uncle) Martin Cozner (brother-in-law) Carol Wilg (goddaughter) Gary (ex-brother-in-law) Unnamed uncle (deceased)
- Nationality: American

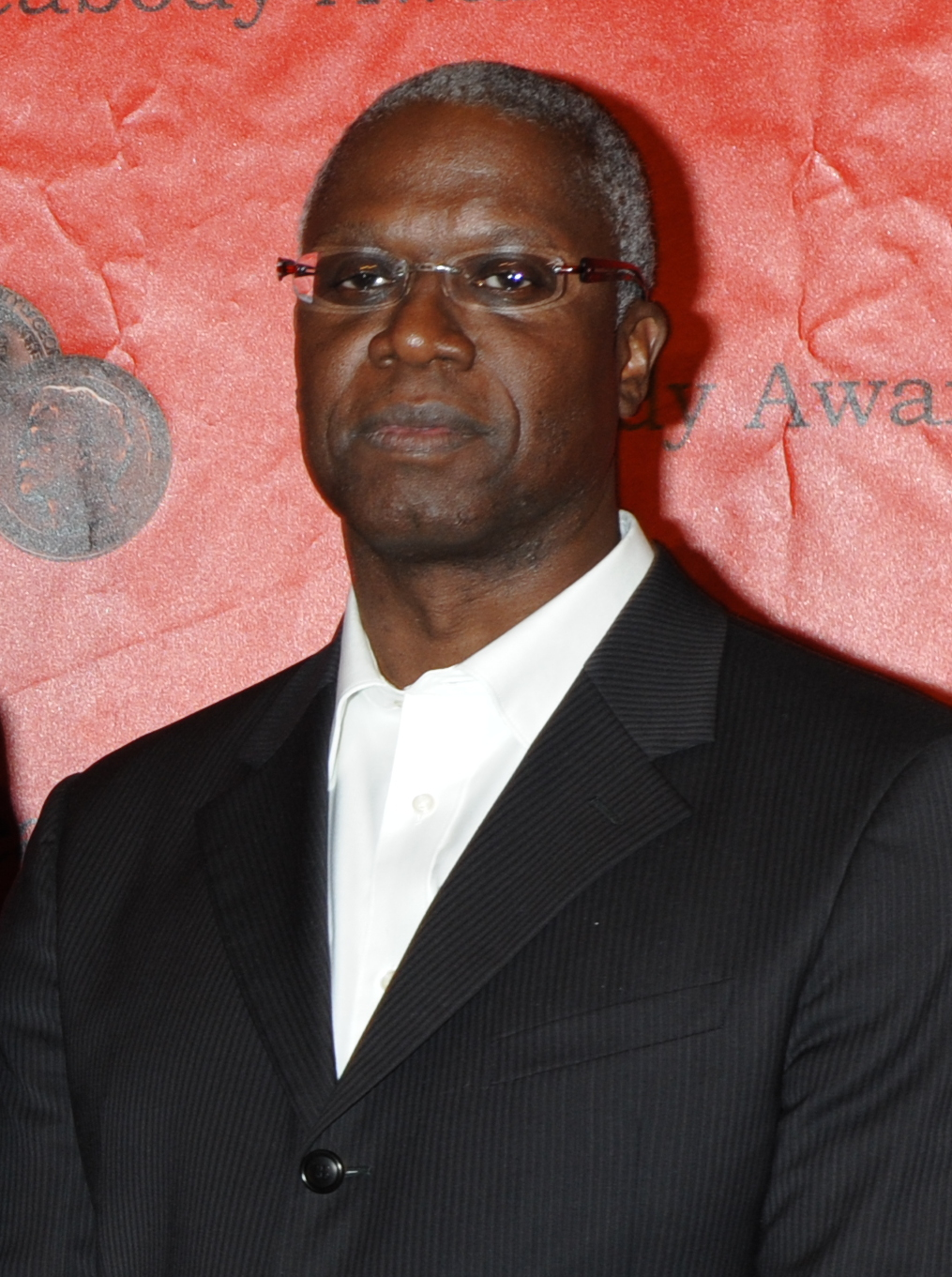
Andre Braugher

Andre Braugher portrays Raymond "Ray" Jacob Holt, the 99th Precinct's strict commanding officer. Holt is known for his cold, calm, robotic manner of speaking, overly formal demeanor, and lack of outwardly visible emotion, although he believes himself quite expressive, and his non-work friends frequently refer to him having a much more fun persona that is rarely seen by his colleagues. He has sophisticated and cultured interests, enjoying classical music, opera, and attending dinner parties with his husband's academic friends. The 99th Precinct is Holt's first command despite many years of outstanding service, and he attributes the delay to prejudice against both his race and homosexuality. He came out in 1987 and led a group that supported LGBTQ African-American NYPD members, which he himself created. He was a homicide detective in the 1980s, and spent twelve years in the Community Affairs Bureau immediately prior to promoting to Captain of the Nine-Nine.

Holt is married to Kevin Cozner, the Chair of Columbia University's Classics department. He and Kevin own a corgi named Cheddar, a well-trained dog to whom they are both significantly attached. Holt had a longstanding professional rivalry with Madeline Wuntch, with whom he came up through the ranks. The two were once friends, but their friendship soured; while his career stalled, she kept advancing. After he and Peralta successfully solve a major case in "The Chopper", Bureau Chief Wuntch nominated him for a promotion to head of the NYPD Public Affairs Division, a promotion he was forced to accept to avoid Wuntch transferring his staff to undesirable precincts. During the number of weeks Holt was in charge of Public Affairs, he was unable to accomplish anything significant thanks to Chief Wuntch's constant micromanaging. After helping Peralta solve a serial killer case, Holt found himself transferred back to command of the Nine-Nine by the Chief of Brooklyn Detectives thanks to Jake giving him credit for the case. He owned a burgundy Chevrolet Corvair named Gertie which was his prized possession until it was stolen in "The Fugitive". Doug Judy purchased him a new identical one and names it Sexarella. He also had a mysterious tattoo that was left unknown until the series finale, where it is revealed to be Kevin's head on the body of Cheddar.

At the end of season three, Jake and Holt were forced to go into witness protection in Florida when they were threatened by crime boss Jimmy "The Butcher" Figgis. He worked at a family entertainment center called the Fun Zone under the alias 'Greg Stickney' until he and Jake baited Figgis into coming to Florida and taking the criminal down with the Nine-Nine, an act the squad was punished for by being put on the night shift. In season five, his life and career were put at risk when he made a deal with mobster Seamus Murphy in exchange for information to clear Jake and Rosa's names from Lt. Hawkins, but the Nine-Nine and Kevin helped him capture Murphy.

Later in season five, Holt learned that the New York City Police Commissioner was retiring at the end of the year and that he was on the shortlist of candidates to replace him. He spent the rest of the season campaigning to win the Commissioner title, but ended up losing to John Kelly. In season six, Holt was encouraged by Jake and Amy to stand up to Kelly's regressive policies, leading the Commissioner to retaliate against the Nine-Nine. However, Peralta and Wuntch team up, without Holt's knowledge, to take Kelly down, resulting in Wuntch being named interim Commissioner. This détente becomes short-lived as Holt was demoted to a uniformed officer by Commissioner Wuntch after she found out he was promoted to detective too soon earlier in his career. Shortly after Wuntch's death, however, he is quickly promoted back to captain in the middle of the seventh season. At the beginning of season eight, Holt and Kevin were separated as a result of the hardships they endured in 2020, but they got back together and started attending couples counseling, which eventually resulted in the two renewing their vows. For his work in the police reform program proposal, he was also promoted to deputy commissioner of the program.

Over the course of the series, Jake matures under his direction and Holt becomes more lighthearted in return; the two acknowledge they have a father-son dynamic with each other. In the series finale, Holt tells Jake if he had a son like him, he would be proud of the man Jake became. Captain Holt is one of two characters, the other being Jake, to appear in every episode.

==== Awards and decorations ====
The following are the medals and service awards fictionally worn by Holt.

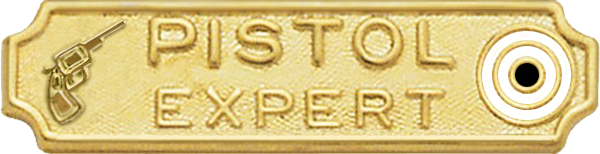
| American Flag Breast Bar |
| World Trade Center Breast Bar |
| NYPD Medal for Valor |
| NYPD Meritorious Police Duty (with numeral "10") |
| NYPD Excellent Police Duty |
| NYPD Firearms Proficiency Bar |

While his commendations are not specifically covered in the series, in the episode "Stakeout", he received a commendation for his supervision of Det. Diaz's drug task force.

=== Michael Hitchcock ===
Michael Hitchcock
- First appearance: "Pilot"
- Created by: Dan Goor; Michael Schur
- Portrayed by: Dirk Blocker; Wyatt Nash (young)

In-universe information
- Gender: Male
- Occupation: Detective 3rd Grade
- Spouses: Lucille (ex-wife); Brandi (ex-wife); Francine (ex-wife); Madison (ex-wife); Bethany (ex-wife); Anna Rubov (ex-wife); two unnamed ex-wives
- Significant other: Jenny (ex-girlfriend)
- Relatives: Unnamed father (deceased); Unnamed step-sister; Unnamed son-in-law
- Nationality: American

Dirk Blocker portrays Michael Hitchcock (season 2–present; recurring season 1), an enthusiastic but clueless detective who has been best friends and partners with Scully for over 30 years. Despite their inept nature, Hitchcock and Scully have both shown on occasion to be competent and even good detectives, though their laziness tends to keep them from demonstrating this most of the time. As revealed in "Hitchcock and Scully", the two were excellent detectives in their youths and had well-built bodies, but their careers and their physiques went downhill after they tried the buffalo wings at their eventual favorite restaurant, Wing Slutz, which they frequently went to for the food and to check in on the manager (who was secretly an informant who helped them bring down a notorious mafia boss). Unlike most police detectives, Hitchcock and Scully are more than happy to do paperwork rather than expend any energy in the field.

The majority of the precinct tends to be disgusted by Hitchcock's more perverted nature and attitude towards women. It is revealed in "The Last Ride" that Hitchcock held the all-time record for closed cases at the 99th Precinct, one more than Jeffords as of that episode. This was mainly due to him being at the precinct twenty years longer than Terry. To celebrate, Hitchcock got a tattoo of himself holding a gun and putting it in his mouth, oblivious to what it actually implies. In season eight, Hitchcock seemingly retired after receiving a package as a result of the COVID-19 pandemic and moved to Brazil while keeping in touch with Scully and the precinct via FaceTime. However, the series finale revealed that he didn't retire and was actually living in his van, allowing him to win the final heist in the series.

Hitchcock appeared in every episode of the series but six: Coral Palms: Part 1, The Box, Balancing, PB & J, Game of Boyles and Renewal.

==== Awards and decorations ====
The following are the medals and service awards fictionally worn by Hitchcock.

| American Flag Breast Bar |

=== Norm Scully ===
Norm Scully
- First appearance: "Pilot"
- Created by: Dan Goor; Michael Schur
- Portrayed by: Joel McKinnon Miller; Alan Ritchson (young)

In-universe information
- Gender: Male
- Occupation: Detective
- Spouse: Kelly (ex-wife)
- Significant others: Cindy Shatz (girlfriend); Lucille (ex-girlfriend)
- Children: 2
- Relatives: Earl Scully (twin brother)
- Nationality: American

Joel McKinnon Miller portrays Norman "Norm" Scully (season 2–present; recurring season 1), a middle-aged, lazy detective who has been best friends and partners with Hitchcock for over 30 years. Scully shows talent as an operatic tenor and French speaker, has an understanding of Morse code and can "make great coffee", according to Jeffords. He also displays an uncanny ability to reassemble shredded documents in one episode. Scully routinely discloses disgusting medical issues like the entire bottom of his foot being a wart or having various strains of fungi. He claims to constantly have medical emergencies, and despite having a pacemaker fitted, he frequently has heart attacks. He often embarrasses himself either unintentionally or willingly and admits to being indifferent to the judgment of others (most frequently, the fellow members of his squad.) In the early seasons, Scully is married and has a dog. The team is unsure which one of them is called Kelly, though it is later revealed in season seven that both of them had this name. After his wife left him, he began dating a woman named Cindy Shatz, who is very similar to him in her attire and personality. He has a twin brother named Earl, also portrayed by Miller. Like Hitchcock, Scully began his NYPD career as a strapping powerhouse detective before devolving into chicken wing-fueled sloth and gluttony, but both men are actually competent even in their decrepitude: at one point when they've cracked one of Boyle's cases, he's shocked when they tell him they would rather be ignored and sidelined than spotlighted, and Rosa and Amy go from being angered when they appear to screw up a case to being genuinely impressed when Scully tells them they deleted a witness' information because she was an illegal immigrant and would have been arrested and deported by ICE (Scully accepts a "punishment" of a one-week paid suspension, as does his partner).

Scully appeared in every episode of the series but three: Coral Palms: Part 1, The Box, PB & J

==== Awards and decorations ====
The following are the medals and service awards fictionally worn by Scully.

| American Flag Breast Bar |
| World Trade Center Breast Bar |
| NYPD Excellent Police Duty |

== Recurring characters ==
=== NYPD and other law enforcement ===
- Patton Oswalt as FDNY Fire Marshal Boone, the fire marshal of the local fire station. He leads the fire department in a rivalry against the detectives of the 99 but reaches a brief understanding with Jake when they discover that they both were abandoned at a young age by their fathers.
- Dean Winters as Captain Keith Pembroke, nicknamed "The Vulture", an obnoxious detective in the Major Crimes Unit notorious for taking over cases that are nearly solved and receiving all of the credit for closing them. He frequently makes lewd comments toward the squad and has a greatly inflated sense of self. After the death of Seth Dozerman, Pembroke became the Commanding Officer of the 99th Precinct until Captain Holt returned, where he treated the squad with disrespect. In "The Venue", the Vulture stole Jake and Amy's venue at the last second to host his wedding to a kind charity worker named Jean Munhroe. When the two discovered that he is unfaithful to Jean and was lying to her about his character, they decided to tell Jean at the cost of the Vulture taking their venue on their wedding night. He is recruited onto Jake's "suicide squad" to help take down Commissioner John Kelly. However, he made a deal with Madeline Wuntch to betray the 99 in exchange for becoming captain of the 69th Precinct, though the betrayal was part of Jake and Wuntch's plan to trick John Kelly. He is a recipient of the American Flag Breast Bar, World Trade Center Breast Bar, NYPD Medal of Honor, and Marine Corps Service Award.
- Kyle Bornheimer as Sergeant Teddy Ramos (né Wells), a detective at the 82nd Precinct. Teddy used to date Amy Santiago, and they resumed their relationship after meeting up at a training exercise. Later Amy broke up with him again because she dislikes his dull personality and is unable to show interest in his home pilsner-brewing hobby. In season four, Teddy evaluated the Nine-Nine when the crime rate dropped and one precinct had to close. He claimed to have changed but Jake and Amy agree that he is still "the most boring man in America". He also admitted to Amy that he still loves her and proposed to her several times over the next few seasons. In season five, Teddy joined the bomb squad to impress Amy and tried unsuccessfully to steal her away from Jake on the day of their wedding. In season seven, Teddy reveals he married someone named Elizabeth Ramos, took her last name, and was expecting a child around the same time Jake and Amy were expecting theirs. Despite having a wife and child, he still wants Amy to marry him.
- Gabe Liedman as Oliver Cox, a lab technician who works as a DNA analyst and coroner at the 99th Precinct.
- Jason Mantzoukas as Adrian Pimento, an emotionally unstable and volatile former detective who returned to the 99th Precinct after spending 12 years undercover in the organization of Jimmy "The Butcher" Figgis. He began dating Rosa in "Cheddar", and the two got engaged in "Paranoia", promptly before Pimento and the 99 were forced to fake his death when Figgis started targeting him. Pimento returned from hiding after Figgis was caught, but was refused his old job at the NYPD and became a Private Investigator. His relationship continued with Rosa, but she later broke up with him in season five. He spent the next couple of months in Alaska before returning to Brooklyn as an insurance agent in "Gray Star Mutual", but was fired and started working at a hand lotion store. In "Pimemento", he became a private investigator once more and started working with celebrities after Jake and Boyle helped him catch a doctor who was drugging Pimento to induce memory loss. In the series finale, after Rosa uses him as a distraction to try and win the final heist, he flew to Canada upon being hired to protect a diamond mine from a pack of wolves.
- James M. Connor as Deputy Commissioner Podolski, the NYPD's arrogant deputy police commissioner who uses his position for his own personal means such as keeping his rebellious son, Trevor, out of jail in "The Tagger".
- Michael G. Hagerty as Captain McGintley, the 99th Precinct's commanding officer before Raymond Holt, who was fired for his ineptitude and his permissive attitude toward the disruptive antics of Jake and his colleagues. McGintley later died in the episode "99" and the squad attended his funeral in Los Angeles.
- Kyra Sedgwick as Chief Madeline Wuntch, a callous and unethical NYPD deputy police chief who shared a deep mutual hostility with Captain Holt. Wuntch and Holt were once partners and friends, but they had a falling out. Holt believed it was because he rejected her sexual advances; however, she later states that his sexuality is the one thing that she respects about him and the hostility is the result of other incidents. Wuntch gained promotions for which Holt was passed over, resulting in Wuntch eventually becoming Holt's direct superior. Wuntch constantly went out of her way to undermine the 99th Precinct, and appeared to take great pleasure in its and Holt's failures; Holt, in turn, gleefully insulted and belittled Wuntch every time their paths crossed. In "The Chopper" and "Johnny and Dora", she culminated her victory over Holt when she made him head of the NYPD Public Affairs Division, where she humiliated him by making him do menial jobs, although he was eventually transferred back to the 99 thanks to Jake. In "Suicide Squad", she helped Jake and the Nine-Nine expose Commissioner Kelly's illegal wiretapping activity and became the acting commissioner until a new one was decided on. She swiftly used this authority to demote Holt to a patrol officer as he had previously revealed he was promoted out of uniform ahead of the usual expected hours, "justifying" her decision as making Holt stick to the rules. Wuntch died in the episode "Ding Dong" from unknown causes and Holt was returned to his usual captain's rank, but left a final move where she forced Holt to organise a respectful memorial for her. At her memorial, Holt admitted that he will genuinely miss her and their rivalry.
- Perry L. Brown as Marcus Marinovich, a judge at the New York Court of Appeals who sometimes oversees cases for the 99. He served as the judge when Peralta and Diaz were on trial in "Crime and Punishment".
- Will Hines as Carl Kurm, the Kings County District Attorney who sometimes works with the 99 during court cases.
- Ken Marino as Captain Jason "C.J." Stentley, the Nine-Nine's temporary, under-qualified captain when Jake and Holt were in witness protection. Not wanting his ineptitude to be evident, he gave everyone everything they asked for until Amy eventually requested he starts being more firm. This backfired after he rejected their request to go to Florida to assist Jake and Holt and he assigned them to the night shift. He was eventually removed from the Captain position after he was rewarded for taking down a major drug dealer (that Jake and Holt primarily took care of) and demonstrated his lack of professionalism in front of a group of reporters. It's revealed that Holt called the reporters in to help the crew return to the day shift. He is recruited onto Jake's "suicide squad" to help take down Commissioner John Kelly, with his role acting as a kidnapping victim, but his incompetence nearly derails their plans.
- Allison Tolman as Captain Olivia Crawford, a candidate for the Commissioner position Holt was also seeking. She holds the belief that precincts should be eliminated, creating a rivalry with Holt. However, she and Holt realized that their competition will split the votes and cause John Kelly to win. She eventually withdrew her candidacy to thank Holt for publicly calling out the selection committee when they admitted they only nominated her for PR purposes and had no intention of actually considering her for the role.
- Matt Walsh as Detective Lohank, a night-shift worker for the 99th precinct who shares Diaz's desk. Lohank is shown to have an unfortunate personal life; his wife is addicted to painkillers, while he has prostate cancer. He owns a summer cabin, dubbed "Stink Puddle Manor", which he lends to Jeffords, Peralta, and Boyle in "Into the Woods".
- Vanessa Bayer as Debbie Fogle, Holt's partner when he got demoted down to patrolman. She doesn't appear to have any friends and is very naive. She mentioned that she became a police officer to solve her twin sister's murder, much to Holt's surprise. It is later revealed that she was a mole for a notorious crime boss named Silvio Nucci and stole machine guns and cocaine from the evidence locker room, the unintended consequence of Boyle telling her to be more assertive. Jake and Rosa initially pretended to be dirty cops so they can get her to lead them to Nucci, but she overpowered both of them after ingesting some of the cocaine. After discovering most of Debbie's bad choices stemmed from her parents treating her poorly, Rosa empathized with her and convinced her to free them so they could take down Nucci together, leading to a cocaine-powered Debbie punching Nucci and knocking him unconscious before the 99's team arrested him. While Debbie was immediately fired and jailed on serious charges after this, Rosa tells Jake the DA is likely to sentence her to "only" 10 years in prison, so Debbie will be able to rebuild her life later on if she has the will to do so.

=== Family and friends of main characters ===
- Kevin Dorff as Hank, the bartender at Shaw's Bar, the squad's favorite bar. He is generally annoyed by the squad's antics but tolerates them because they spend a lot of money.
- Marc Evan Jackson as Professor Kevin M. Cozner, PhD, Holt's husband and the Chair of Columbia University's Classics Department. Kevin dislikes the NYPD due to their racism and homophobia towards Holt, but is more open towards the Ninety-Ninth Precinct when Jake shows him how much they respect and care for Holt. Like his husband, Kevin is cold, sardonic, formal, and unemotional but believes himself expressive (the couple's romantic nicknames for one another are "Captain Raymond Holt" and "Professor Kevin Cozner"); he considers Holt the "funny" one in their relationship. Kevin has a rapport with Gina Linetti, referring to her by her first name (by contrast, he initially takes pains to always call Jake "Peralta"). Kevin and Holt own a Pembroke Welsh Corgi named Cheddar, who is often integral to the Halloween Heist. Kevin and Holt separate in the eighth season after Holt neglects their relationship, but ultimately reconcile and renew their vows.
- Craig Robinson as Doug Judy, aka "The Pontiac Bandit", an intelligent, happy-go-lucky thief and forger who exclusively steals Pontiac vehicles. Judy is first introduced in Season 1 when he is arrested by Rosa; he claims to have information about the Pontiac Bandit; in the end, he reveals himself as the Pontiac Bandit, and escapes. Judy, who subsequently appears in one episode each season, always stays one step ahead of Jake, but by season three considers Jake his best friend; by season four, the feeling is mutual. Judy helps Jake and Holt capture his (Judy's) foster brother, an escaped convicted murderer, and is given immunity for his past crimes. In season five, he gets blackmailed into taking hostages when a shady figure from his past threatens his mother; he enlists Jake's help in taking him down, and escapes again. In season six, Doug fakes his own death when a former associate threatens him; when he, Jake, and Terry investigate, they discover Judy's sister, Trudy, is operating as the new Pontiac Bandit. In season seven, he is engaged to a federal judge named Katherine Joyner and, after a bachelor party in Miami that ends with Jake arresting three members of his wedding party, asks Jake to be his best man. In season eight, he is arrested for his crimes in New Jersey and makes one last attempt to evade Jake, but ends up saving him from one of Trudy's men. However, he escapes after Jake gives him a pen to get out of his handcuffs, and moves to Amsterdam with his wife.
- Eva Longoria as Sophia Perez, a defense attorney whom Jake dates in season two. Jake and Sophia first meet at a bar and engage in a one-night stand before he discovers that she represents a criminal against whom he is testifying. Despite the initial hostility, they soon begin a relationship. Sophia eventually ends the relationship after Jake arrests her boss for drug possession, leaving Jake devastated.
- Jillian Davis as Jenny Gildenhorn, Jake's childhood sweetheart. Throughout the first two seasons, Jake is shown to have a minor obsession with her, stemming from losing her to Eddie Fung at his (Jake's) bar mitzvah. Jenny makes her only appearance in "The Boyle-Linetti Wedding", where Jake sees an opportunity to finally make a move on her. However, she ends up kissing another wedding guest. Tiffany Martin portrays Jenny as a teenager in a flashback.
- Stephen Root as Charles's father Lynn Boyle, a retired florist who is known to get overly eager and take big risks like his son. He marries Gina's mother Darlene, but the two eventually divorce after Darlene cheats on him. In "Game of Boyles", it is revealed that Charles is not his biological son as his wife had an affair with a rival florist, but still chose to raise him like a true Boyle.
- Sandra Bernhard as Gina's mother, Darlene Linetti, a travel agent who shares her daughter's confidence and superstitions. She marries Charles' father Lynn in "The Boyle-Linetti Wedding". Gina convinces her mother to divorce Lynn after discovering she had been cheating on him.
- Marilu Henner as Vivian Ludley, a food author who becomes romantically involved with Boyle. She and Boyle become engaged within weeks of dating, but she breaks it off when Boyle refuses to move to Canada with her.
- Bradley Whitford as Captain Roger Peralta, Jake's absentee father and commercial airline pilot. He left his family when Jake was at a young age and has cheated on his wife with multiple women. He eventually attempts to reconcile with Jake and Karen even when the latter knew about an affair with her best friend. In "Two Turkeys" it's revealed that besides Jake he has three daughters with other women and an unknown number of other sons.
- Katey Sagal as Karen Peralta, Jake's mother. She is a public school art teacher who worked hard to raise Jake as a single mother after Roger left the family. Despite their past, Karen eventually begins dating Roger again much to Jake's discomfort.
- Martin Mull as Admiral Walter Peralta, Jake's paternal grandfather. A retired United States Navy Admiral who has a strained relationship with his son.
- Nasim Pedrad as Katie Peralta, Jake's half-sister on his father's side as a result of Roger's affairs. She lives in Dallas, Texas, and has a chaotic personality that Jake and Amy have a hard time handling.
- Merrin Dungey as Sharon Jeffords, Terry's wife. She is kind and supportive towards her husband and his profession, but can occasionally be stubborn and does not like being lied to. She is often seen taking care of their twin daughters Cagney and Lacey and eventually gives birth to their third daughter Ava in season three.
- Kelsey and Skyler Yates (seasons 3–4) and Dani and Dannah Lockett (season 7) as Cagney and Lacey Jeffords, Terry and Sharon's twin daughters.
- Jamal Duff as Zeke, Terry's unemployed brother-in-law. Zeke has an even more intimidating physique than Terry and is also significantly taller. He often taunts Terry, calling him "Tiny Terry", and mocking his police work, leaving Terry to turn to Captain Holt for help.
- Jimmy Smits as Victor Santiago, Amy's father. He is a retired cop and is shown to be overly organized and competitive like his daughter. He initially does not approve of Amy's relationship with Jake, but changes his mind and respects his daughter's decision after he and Jake solve one of Victor's older cases.
- Bertila Damas as Camila Santiago, Amy's mother. Like her daughter, she can occasionally be over-controlling and competitive.
- Lin-Manuel Miranda as David Santiago, Amy's older brother. He is an NYPD Lieutenant who often makes Amy jealous of his accomplishments and for being their parents' favorite child.
- Nick Cannon as Marcus, Holt's nephew, who begins a romantic relationship with Detective Rosa Diaz in season two. Rosa breaks up with him in season three due to him being too emotional for her and also because he wanted to get married which she was not ready for.
- Niecy Nash as Debbie, Holt's sister. Unlike her brother, she tends to be loud and overdramatic about her life, making it difficult for Holt to be around her.
- L. Scott Caldwell as Laverne Holt, Holt's mother and a federal judge. Holt refers to her as "Your Honor".
- Mary Lynn Rajskub as Genevieve Mirren-Carter, an art curator who was initially framed for stealing her own paintings for the insurance money. She was eventually vindicated by Charles and begins dating him over similar interests. Genevieve and Charles adopted a son, Nikolaj, on whom he dotes.
- Antonio Raul Corbo as Nikolaj Boyle, Charles and Genevieve's adopted Latvian son.
- Danny Trejo as Oscar Diaz, Rosa's father. He is a school teacher who is intimidating and tough like his daughter. When Rosa comes out as bisexual, he doesn't take it well at first but manages to accept his daughter for who she is.
- Olga Merediz as Julia Diaz, Rosa's mother. Unlike her husband, it took longer for her to fully accept her daughter's bisexuality.
- Sarah Baker as Kylie, Amy's only friend outside of the precinct, who works for the Department of Records.
- Cameron Esposito as Jocelyn Pryce, Rosa's former girlfriend who works as a cosmetologist.
- Joel McKinnon Miller as Earl Scully, Norm's twin brother who looks and behaves identically to him. The two had a brief falling out when Norm's wife cheated on him with Earl.
- Winston Story as Bill Hummertrout, a male prostitute whom Charles and Jake hire on the fourth and fifth Halloween heists due to his resemblance to Charles. He later gets the two involved in a pyramid scheme called "Nutriboom," and appears in all the heists starting from the fourth. During the events of the seventh heist, he appears to have become homeless during the six months the heist took place.
- Tim Meadows as Caleb John Gosche, Jake's cellmate, a woodworker who is also a convicted cannibal child murderer. He and Jake become friends in prison and Caleb saves Jake's life when Jeff Romero, a gang leader, identifies Jake as a snitch. He is transferred to a different prison, and Jake occasionally comes to see him for help on cases.

== Antagonists ==
- Chris Parnell as Geoffrey Hoytsman, Sophia's boss at the Public Defender's office who has issues with drugs. Jake arrests him for using cocaine in "The Defense Rests", which ultimately leads to Sophia breaking up with Jake. He returned in "Sabotage", where he attempted to get revenge on Jake for ruining his life, but was foiled by Amy and Rosa.
- Aida Turturro as Maura Figgis, the sister of notorious gangster Jimmy "The Butcher" Figgis. She leads a prison gang in a maximum-security women's penitentiary in Texas. Amy goes undercover as "Isabel Cortez" within the prison to learn the identity of Figgis' FBI contact from Maura.
- Eric Roberts as Jimmy "The Butcher" Figgis, a mobster whom Pimento went undercover to investigate. He made a threat against Jake and Holt's lives, forcing them to go into hiding. After months of witness protection, Jake and Holt lured Figgis into Florida to take him down with help from the Nine-Nine.
- Dennis Haysbert as Bob Annderson, a former partner of Holt's who eventually worked for the FBI. He is brought in to help find info on the mole working for Jimmy "The Butcher" Figgis, but when going to interrogate a witness, Annderson pulls a gun on Holt and revealed that he was the mole the entire time. The Nine-Nine was able to capture Annderson and con him into revealing the files he has on Figgis, leading to Annderson's arrest and the destruction of Figgis' empire.
- Gina Gershon as Lieutenant Melanie Hawkins, the head of the NYPD's most elite task force. Jake and Rosa both admired her and competed against each other for a spot on her team. However, they soon learned that her team was a bank robbery crew. When they tried to work undercover to bring her down, she framed Jake and Rosa and got them convicted for armed robbery. However, Holt received inside information from mobster Seamus Murphy, leading to Hawkins' arrest and Jake and Rosa's exoneration.
- Paul Adelstein as Seamus Murphy, a notorious mobster. He assisted the Nine-Nine in exposing Hawkins' crimes, as the two sides saw Hawkins as a common threat. Murphy offered Amy incriminating information about Hawkins in exchange for a favor, which Holt told her to refuse. Holt later accepted the information himself to keep Amy safe and free Jake and Rosa from prison. When Murphy claimed his favor, Jake and Charles found a way to allow Holt to keep up his end of the bargain while secretly stopping Seamus' illegal activities. When Seamus discovered this, he threatened Kevin's life, leading to Jake and Kevin going into isolation for two months. Holt and Jake are captured by Seamus, but Kevin rescued both of them, and Murphy and his men were apprehended by the FBI.
- Phil Reeves as Commissioner John Kelly. Kelly was named Commissioner at the beginning of Season 6, having won against Holt. His demeanor is extremely condescending and dismissive. Kelly planned to implement a "vigilant policing initiative", which Holt opposed as he believed it would simply be "stop-and-frisk" under a new name. Kelly retaliated by worsening the Nine-Nine's working conditions. In the episode "Sicko", he introduced an app that allows the public to send in anonymous tips; but it is revealed that Kelly has developed the app to cover up the illegal use of a Stingray Phone Tracker to spy on civilians. When Jake and the Nine-Nine—together with the "Suicide Squad", Vulture, CJ, and Madeleine Wuntch—exposed him, he was fired, though Wuntch, as acting Commissioner, told Holt that Kelly had secured a "higher-paying job in the private sector".
- John C. McGinley as Frank O'Sullivan. O'Sullivan is the hard-headed, stubborn, ignorant and bombastic President of the (fictional) NYPD 'Patrolman's Union', and a recurring antagonist in Season 8, constantly getting in the way of the Nine-Nine's attempts to help actually reform the NYPD. He still lives with his mother despite being in his fifties, is a big fan of Billy Joel and views cops as completely infallible and undeserving of any kind of consequences or punishment, regardless of their actions and will defend dirty or overzealous cops with every underhanded trick and loophole he knows. He has a preternaturally high alcohol tolerance, enjoying beers regularly even at breakfast. His LGBTQ views are archaic at best; he attempts to blackmail both Holt and Rosa by threatening to reveal their sexualities to the public and is visibly mystified and annoyed when they tell him that they came out ages ago. Despite his attempts to sabotage the reform program, it passed but O'Sullivan still gets reelected to his position for life, a feat Holt believed was impossible.

== Guest stars (in order of appearance) ==
- Fred Armisen as Mlepnos (also spelled Melipnos or Mlep(clay)nos), a confused foreign man living in a building where a murder took place. The detectives run into Mlepnos in the pilot episode while searching for witnesses. He shows up again in "Operation: Broken Feather". In "Jake & Amy", Hitchcock and Scully recruit him to perform the violin at Jake and Amy's wedding. In his recurring appearances, he denies meeting Jake or Amy before and changes his name.
- Pete Davidson as Steve, an at-risk kid who interrupts and makes fun of Diaz and Santiago. When Gina lists her reasons for joining the program, he still doesn't sign up for the Junior Police program.
- Helen Slayton-Hughes as Ethel Musterberg, a senile woman mistaken for a missing person.
- Mary Elizabeth Ellis as Rossi, a medical examiner whom Jake hooks up with.
- Andy Richter as Hawley, a sarcastic and childish doorman who refuses to assist Jake during routine questioning.
- Kid Cudi as Dustin Whitman, a perpetrator Jake arrests on suspicion of burglary. Whitman mocks Jake by calling him "Joke Peralta" when he learns that Jake does not have sufficient evidence to convict him of a crime, but learns to his regret that he has underestimated Det. Peralta's ability.
- Stacy Keach as Jimmy Brogan, a crime writer from the 1970s whom Peralta greatly admires. Brogan is revealed to be bigoted, racist, homophobic, vengeful, and manipulative, disillusioning Peralta and leading to a physical altercation between the two when Peralta punches Brogan for slurs against Holt.
- Jerry Minor as Jerry Grundhaven, a defense attorney who antagonizes Diaz in court.
- Joey Diaz as Sal, the owner of a pizzeria that got burned down; Jake and Charles have to deal with Fire Marshall Boone on the case.
- Allen Evangelista as "Savant" (Corey Park), the 99th precinct's IT director. He is hired after he hacks the precinct's server out of boredom (he was caught because his mom tipped off the police).
- Adam Sandler as himself, appearing at an auction Jake went undercover at. He proceeds to humiliate Jake onstage.
- Joe Theismann as himself, appearing at an auction Jake went undercover at.
- Nate Torrence as Super Dan, a local vigilante whom Rosa and Amy don't take seriously.
- Sean Whalen as Bill Voss, a criminal with several warrants who accepts a fake trip to the Bahamas before being arrested by Diaz and Jeffords.
- Beth Dover as Janice, a stationery store employee who helps out Charles and Jake when they went to pick up wedding invitations.
- Ian Roberts as Lucas Wint, a civic leader who Jake suspects is laundering money for drug dealers.
- Jenny Slate as Bianca, the girlfriend of a powerful Italian-American mobster.
- Apollo Robbins as Dan "Fingers" McCreary, a thief Jake hires to help steal Holt's watch during the Halloween heist.
- Dan Bakkedahl as Andrew Miller, a lieutenant and investigator from Internal Affairs. He investigates the 99th Precinct for a possible undercover mole until the detectives discover that he himself is spying on the precinct at the behest of Wuntch. Miller has paranoid germophobia.
- Ed Helms as Jack Danger (pronounced donger), an egomaniacal, incompetent, obnoxious agent for the United States Postal Inspection Service whom Jake had to deal with while tracking the Giggle Pig drug gang.
- Nick Kroll as Kendrick, a condescending agent from the Department of Homeland Security who has no respect for the NYPD and makes detectives from the Nine-Nine serve as taped-up "hostages" during a counterterrorism training exercise for Federal law enforcement agencies. Despite Jake leading a 99th rebellion that sees the cops take out nearly all of the Feds, Kendrick manages to "shoot" Jake and informs him the NYPD will not be invited to any future events.
- Garret Dillahunt as Dave Majors, New York City's best detective whom Jake and Amy greatly admire. He takes an interest in Amy much to Jake's dismay, but she turns him down, citing her previous relationship with Teddy.
- Bill Hader as Seth Dozerman, the new Captain of the 99th Precinct after the transfer of Captain Holt to the Public Affairs Division. Within moments of meeting the squad, he rants about their lack of efficiency and his obsession with it, before suffering a heart attack. On his second day, he discloses that he has a genetic heart condition that drastically reduces his life expectancy. He then suffers another heart attack after witnessing Jake and Amy kiss and dies.
- Archie Panjabi as Singh, an NYPD lieutenant who Boyle hooks up with at Dozerman's funeral. He laments being unable to pursue a relationship with her after learning that she is a vegan.
- Jon Daly as Bram Applebaum, a half-Scottish bagpipe player for the NYPD Pipes and Drums, who performs at Dozerman's funeral.
- James Urbaniak as Nick Lingeman, Genevieve's ex-boyfriend and an art gallery owner who Jake and Charles suspect framed Genevieve.
- Stormi Henley as Dvora, Nick's assistant who is romantically interested in him.
- Nick Offerman as Frederick, Holt's ex-boyfriend who broke up with him after Holt threw Frederick's duck ornament off of the Brooklyn Bridge. As a gynecologist, Jake and Holt ask him to help Sharon Jeffords after she goes in labor, with Holt having to confess to throwing away the duck ornament as a condition.
- Anders Holm as Søren Knausgaard, a Swedish Interpol officer who works a case involving stolen jewels from Sweden with Jake and Rosa.
- Riki Lindhome as Agneta Carlsson, a Swedish Interpol officer who works a case involving stolen jewels from Sweden with Jake and Rosa.
- Neil deGrasse Tyson as himself, appearing in the precinct to aid Gina in her study of astrophysics. He is Terry's gym buddy.
- Kathryn Hahn as Eleanor Horstweil, Charles's ex-wife who appears after Charles attempts to withdraw his sperm from cold storage, which was legally under her possession. She holds Charles in very little regard.
- Oscar Nunez as Dr. Porp, a doctor who diagnosed Jake and Holt with the mumps.
- Paul F. Tompkins as Orleans, the captain of the cruise ship that Doug Judy performed piano on when Jake and Amy won a free cruise.
- Damon Wayans Jr. as Stevie Schillens, Jake's former beat partner who comes to the precinct after renovations commence at his own. Charles disregards his presence out of jealousy, and he ends up finding out Schillens is a dirty cop after catching him plant evidence.
- Brad Hall as John William Weichselbraun, a classical oboist who claims his instrument was stolen; also one of Holt's heroes.
- Kate Flannery as "Mean" Marge Bronigan, the precinct's ill-tempered custodian.
- Matt Besser as Holderton, a detective from the 65th precinct who makes fun of Terry for accusing a cat of being a thief.
- Maya Rudolph as Karen Haas, a United States Deputy Marshal who serves as Jake's and Holt's contact while they are in Witness Protection in Florida.
- Rhea Perlman as Estelle, a member of Holt's alias Greg's walking group.
- Jorma Taccone as Taylor, the manager of a children's funhouse Holt works at while hiding as Greg.
- Betsy Sodaro as Jordan Carfton, a lady who took a video that could expose Jake and Holt while they were in Witness Protection.
- Esther Povitsky as Emily, Gina's new assistant granted by Captain Stentley. She's under strict orders from Gina to mock Amy whenever there's an opening.
- Jim O'Heir as Reynolds, a homophobic police sheriff in Florida who detains Jake and Holt after stopping them with a copious number of guns and amount of ammo.
- Zooey Deschanel as Jess Day, a Los Angeles resident who is visiting New York and unwillingly assists Jake in chasing a suspect. Deschanel's appearance is part of a crossover between Brooklyn Nine-Nine and New Girl.
- Fred Melamed as DC Parlov, the author of the Skyfire books, which Terry (and later Jake) are huge fans of. He begins to receive death threats, resulting in Jake and Terry having to protect him. Later the manuscript for his upcoming book is stolen, but it turns out to be an inside job resulting in his arrest.
- Eric Edelstein as Kurt Ovarp, a Skyfire fan who Jake and Terry suspect sent the threat to DC Parlov.
- Marshawn Lynch as himself, who witnesses a prison escape after the transport van crashes (unknowingly caused by himself).
- Charles Baker as George Judy, an escaped convicted murderer, and Doug Judy's former foster brother.
- Jama Williamson as Rachel, Teddy's girlfriend who witnesses him propose to Amy after Jazz brunch.
- Kimberly Hébert Gregory as Veronica Hopkins, Terry's ex-girlfriend and fellow NYPD officer. She holds a massive grudge against Terry for their break-up (as she finds out Terry planned to break up with her a year earlier without telling her) and holds it against the precinct when she's assigned to audit it.
- Nathan Fillion as Mark Deveraux, an actor who plays a detective on a series called Serve & Protect. Deveraux attempts to assist Jake and Rosa when a crime occurs on the show's set, though he's later revealed to be the culprit and is kicked off the show.
- Greg Germann as Gary Lurmax, the executive producer of Serve & Protect. He nearly gives Jake a consulting position on the show, but after Jake lashes out at him and accuses him of a crime he didn't commit, he gets back at Jake by creating an unlikable character on the show named Jake Peralta and has him brutally murdered.
- Kelly Sullivan as Cassie Sinclair, an actress who plays a detective on a series called Serve & Protect. She reports her laptop as stolen, prompting Peralta and Diaz to investigate the set. She is described as rapidly gaining popularity on the show, with a spin-off for her character being developed and causing tensions on the set.
- Kenny Stevenson as Officer Mark, a uniformed officer at the 99 who is brought at the expense of the squad to include someone outside the "inner circle."
- Desmond Harrington as Maldack, an NYPD uniformed officer who used racial profiling to stop and question Sergeant Jeffords in "Moo Moo". After an unsuccessful meeting with Maldack, and much deliberation with Captain Holt, Jeffords filed an official complaint about the incident.
- Andy Daly as Jeffrey Bouche, another rival of Holt's whom he loathes for his chipper attitude and for seemingly undermining his efforts to rise in the NYPD. Holt's suspicions are confirmed after he sabotages his presentation at Cop-Con, filling it with photos from the 99's party the night before.
- Audrey Wasilewski as Cindy Shatz, a Cop-Con attendee who is extremely similar to Scully and later begins dating him.
- Ryan Phillippe as Milton Boyle, Boyle's cousin who begins a relationship with Gina when she becomes pregnant with his child.
- Brent Briscoe as Matthew Langdon, an ex-NYPD officer who went into hiding once learning of Hawkins crookedness. It's later revealed he's an associate of Hawkins, tricking Jake and Rosa into bringing him in as a witness.
- Eugene Cordero as Pandemic, a hacker and friend of Boyle who tries to help clear Peralta and Diaz from crimes.
- Kulap Vilaysack as Jennifer "Nightmare" Huggins, a hacker and colleague of Pandemic who tries to help clear Peralta and Diaz of bank robbery.
- Scott Aukerman as Glandis, a hacker and colleague of Pandemic who tries to help clear Peralta and Diaz of bank robbery.
- Lou Diamond Phillips as Jeff Romero, another inmate whose gang Jake joins.
- Toby Huss as Granville, a prison warden who cuts a deal with Jake to work as a snitch.
- Danielle Aubuchon as Jenny, Hitchcock's prison hook-up, possibly girlfriend, who is incarcerated in the same penitentiary as Diaz.
- Amy Okuda as Chiaki, Terry's temporary girlfriend while living in Japan.
- Maria Thayer as Jean Munhroe, The Vulture's ex-fiancé who works at a charity that provides rice to starving children in Africa.
- Rob Huebel as Landon Lawson, a rival fantasy author to Parlov.
- Reggie Lee as Ronald Yee, a forensics expert whom Holt and Amy try to impress. He is later disgraced for his fraudulent entomology project.
- Paul Scheer as Devin Cathertaur, the Cyber Crimes division leader who takes the precinct's bandwidth.
- Mike Mitchell as Kyle Murphy, Seamus's dimwitted nephew who's been excluded from the Mafia family for his ineptitude.
- Chris Bauer as Dennis Kole, a Negotiator for the NYPD Emergency Service Unit, with the terrible record of having 49 of his first 50 jumpers die. He was called onto what was his first hostage situation in a jewelry store on Atlantic Avenue in "The Negotiation". The hostage-taker, who turned out to be Doug Judy, called for Det. Peralta to negotiate instead, and then later Detectives Diaz and Scully, something that Kole was resentful about.
- Sterling K. Brown as Philip Davidson, a dentist who is a suspect in a murder case that Holt and Peralta interrogate throughout a night.
- Romy Rosemont as Claire Damont, Davidson's lawyer.
- David Fumero as Melvin "Vin" Stermly, Amy's favorite crossword puzzle author who is also a swimsuit model.
- Will Shortz as Sam Jepson, a friend of Vin's who Jake suspects is behind a series of fires.
- Jay Chandrasekhar as himself, who gets conned into being the celebrity spokesperson for the pyramid scheme Nutriboom.
- Kirk Fox as Kurt, Kate Peralta's ex-boyfriend.
- Reginald VelJohnson as himself, whom Charles hires for Jake's Bachelor Party to give a clue for their scavenger hunt but ends up being their designated driver.
- Blake Anderson as Constantine Kane, a member of a rock band whom Amy once dated. He is still in love with Amy and takes a gig to perform at Jake's and Amy's wedding to try to win her back, but Amy burns the contract before it can happen.
- Akiva Schaffer as Brett Booth, a 63rd Precinct detective who is running a task force which Peralta and Boyle both want to join, but Booth refuses them as he still holds Jake accountable for his visual impairment.
- Gina Rodriguez as Alicia, a taxi driver and potential love interest for Rosa whom Terry tries to push towards.
- Kyle Gass as Dario Moretti, a money launderer turned bomber whom Amy arrested. He attempted to ruin Jake's and Amy's nuptials by planting a bomb in the air vents of the recreation center on the day of their wedding.
- Daniel Di Tomasso and Robert Maffia as Gio Costa, a well-mannered drug-running mafia boss whom Hitchcock and Scully apprehended in the 1980s.
- Decker Sadowski and Donna D'Errico as Marisa Costa, ex-wife of criminal Gio Costa, who lives under a pseudonym as Donna, the manager of a Wing Slutz in Marine Park. She worked as a CI for Detectives Hitchcock and Scully in the mid-1980s and aided in the capture of her then-husband for his drug crimes. Hitchcock and Scully stole one of Gio Costa's bags of drug money to help protect her in her new identity, and frequently stopped by Wing Slutz thereafter to check in on Marisa's safety.
- Paul Rust as Mikey Joseph, one of Jake's and Gina's former classmates who is still pursuing his high-school ambitions of making it as a Ska bassist.
- Eugene Lee Yang as a staff member of The Manhattan Club, a bar which Jake and Gina visit.
- Mario Lopez as himself, who gets tricked into attending Gina's going away party only to be rejected.
- Nicole Byer as Trudy Judy, Doug Judy's younger sister who succeeds him as the new "Pontiac Bandit" after discovering his notes. Despite going to prison in her first appearance, she is released early for good behavior and remains close with Doug.
- Rob Riggle as Rob Dulubnik, an FDNY firefighter whom the Nine-Nine compete against to have control over Shaw's.
- Michael Mosley as Franco McCoy, a detective of the NYPD CSU. McCoy is self-enthusiastic to the point of arrogance and clashes with Peralta and Diaz at an 'unsolvable' crime scene.
- Karan Soni as Gordon Lundt, a spy whom Commissioner Kelly sent to spy on Holt. He was trying to get the opening as the Civilian Administrator.
- Briga Heelan as Keri Brennan, an expert in statistical arbitrage, who was sexually assaulted by her boss and decided to press charges in a "he said, she said" scenario.
- Jonathan Chase as Seth Haggerty, a banker who sustained penile injuries at the hands of Brennan.
- Richard Finkelstein and E.J. Callahan as Ernest Zumowski aka "The Disco Strangler", Holt's most infamous collar from his career as a detective, who was initially thought to be dead in a prison van accident.
- Ike Barinholtz as Gintars Irbe, a Latvian clothing counterfeiter who is Nikolaj's biological father.
- David Paymer as William Tate, a therapist with a murdered client. He was investigated by Jake and Charles, and later revealed as the murderer.
- Julia Sweeney as Pam, a patient in the hospital room next to where Jake and Amy are having their "Casecation" and constantly is entering their room.
- Oliver Muirhead as Wesley Allister, the dean of the classics department at the university Kevin works at, who thinks Captain Holt is not intelligent.
- Bob Stephenson as Randy, a janitor at the university who stole the expensive coins and tried to frame another professor.
- Sarah Claspell as Heather, one of the uniformed officers under Santiago's command.
- Sean Astin as Knox, a murder suspect who disguises himself as an NYPD sergeant to erase the evidence of his crime.
- Travis Coles as "Broadway" Brian Floomryde, a would-be performer who works as a civilian administrator in the records department of the 99th Precinct. Jeffords managed to convince Floomryde to quit his job to pursue his Broadway dreams so as to remain at the Precinct; however, after learning that he was vocally untalented and had a young family, Jeffords told Floomryde not to quit.
- Merrick McCartha as Frank Murwin.
- Nicole Bilderback as Julie Kim, the new Captain of the 99th Precinct for a day while Holt spends his time as a patrolman. She makes efforts to connect with everyone in the squad, further shown when she invited them to a party at her house. She views Holt as an inspiration for her police career, requesting to Wuntch to authorize her transfer to the 99 despite the latter's disdain for Holt. She quits after she finds out that Peralta is trying to dig up some dirt on her.
- Jim Rash as Dr. Jones, Pimento's doctor who claims he is suffering from anterograde amnesia when in reality, he is trying to kill Pimento since his wife hired Pimento to investigate if he was having an affair.
- Michael McDonald as Adam Jarver, Wuntch's nephew. He initially pretends to be another nemesis to Wuntch at her memorial at his late aunt's request to expose Holt's insults toward her as a final attempt to ruin her rival's career, but Holt outsmarted both of them by throwing a fake memorial.
- J. K. Simmons as Frank Dillman, a detective respected by Holt for his highly analytical approach. Despite his keen observational skills, he was fired by the NYPD and SFPD and worked part time at a Yarn Barn.
- Eva La Dare as Captain Brenda Shawnks, the lead on the selection panel for the NYPD Police Band.
- Will Hines as Carl Kurm, an Assistant district attorney who tries to get Hitchcock & Scully punished for not taking down the name of a witness needed in court.
- Jon Gabrus as Curt, a firefighter with the FDNY who responded to the 99's call when a blackout trapped Holt & Jeffords in an elevator, and later delivered Santiago's child.
- Jill Basey as Dotty, an elderly civilian who asks Peralta & Boyle for help during a blackout, only to constantly criticise them and later be arrested.
- Ellie Reed as Kayla, a bachelorette whose pedal pub is commandeered by Peralta & Boyle.
- Brendan McNamara as Russ, a suspected drunk-driver who stages a crash to cause a blackout.
- Paul Witten as Todd, a man Amy and Rosa set Holt up on a date with in an attempt to bring him closer to Kevin.
- Joanna Newsom as Caroline Saint-Jacques Renard, the associate principal cellist for the Berlin Philharmonic whom Holt hired to perform during the final heist.
