= Samuel Judy =

American politician

Samuel Judy (August 19, 1773 – January 12, 1838) was a Swiss-born American pioneer, military leader and legislator.

Born in the canton of Basel, Switzerland, Judy and his family moved to Maryland and then to Kaskaskia, Illinois Territory. Judy became a colonel in the Illinois Militia taking part in expeditions against the Native Americans; he was also one of the first settlers in Madison County, Illinois in the Goshen Settlement. In 1814–1815, Judy served in the Illinois Territorial Council of the Illinois Territorial Legislature. He also served as county commissioner for Madison County, Illinois. Judy died in Madison County, Illinois. His son Thomas Judy served in the Illinois General Assembly.

Samuel Judy was also a slave holder. There are bills of sale in the Madison County Recorder's Office recording his purchase of slaves in 1816.
