= David Fumero =

American actor

- Born: December 29, 1972 (age 53); Havana, Cuba
- Occupation: Actor
- Years active: 1997–present
- Spouse: Melissa Gallo (m. 2007)
- Children: 2

David Fumero is an American actor and former fashion model. Fumero is best known for his roles as Cristian Vega on One Life to Live, Mike Sandoval on Power, and as the man who swept Mariah Carey off her feet on the beach in her video for her song "Honey".

== Personal life ==
David Fumero was born on December 29, 1972, in Havana, Cuba. He is a former United States Marine.

On December 9, 2007, Fumero married his One Life to Live co-star Melissa Fumero (née Gallo) who played Adriana Cramer on the show. They have two children together, a son born in March 2016 and another son born in February 2020.

Fumero has frequently criticized the Cuban government on social media. In July 2021, David Fumero made a series of Instagram posts accusing the Cuban government of corruption and using deadly force against unarmed Cuban protestors.

== Filmography ==
=== Film ===
Year	Title	Role	Notes
2005	Carrie's Choice	Ted	Short film
2007	Greetings from the Shore	Benicio Aceveda	
2008	Manhattanites	Juan	
2010	Trio	Sam	Short film
2014	Crazy Bitches	Eddie	Boxxpress.de

=== Television ===
Year	Title	Role	Notes
1998–2011	One Life to Live	Cristian Vega	468 episodes
2008	Law & Order: Criminal Intent	Chef	Episode: "Contract"
2009	Important Things with Demetri Martin	Stand-in	Episode: "Coolness"
2011	Kourtney and Kim Take New York	Himself	Episode: "In a New York Minute"
2011	CSI: Miami	Armando Salazar	Episode: "Last Stand"
2012	CSI: NY	Benny Madera	Episode: "Blood Out"
2015–2017	Power	Mike Sandoval	30 episodes
2017	NCIS: Los Angeles	Miguel Salazar	Episode: "767"
2017	Where's Daddy?	Hector	Television film
2018	Brooklyn Nine-Nine	Melvin "Vin" Stermley	Episode: "The Puzzle Master"
2019	Chicago Fire	John Garrett	Episode: "Until The Weather Breaks”
2019–2020	L.A.'s Finest	Lt. Jason Calloway	Recurring role
2020	Magnum P.I.	Dante	Episode: "Easy Money"
2021	Generation	Delilah's Father	Episode: "Built for Pleasure"
2023	The Equalizer	Diego Alcazar	Episode: "Love Hurts"
2024	S.W.A.T.	Lt. Raul Vignisson	Episode: "Gang Unit"
2025	Matlock	Dino Coletti	Episode: "Tricks of the Trade"
2026	The Pitt	Derek Foster	Episode: "4:00 P.M."

=== Music Videos ===
Year	Artist	Song
1997	Mariah Carey	"Honey"
