= Winston Story =

American actor (born 1971)

- Occupation: Actor
- Years active: 1995–present
- Known for: Grey's Anatomy; Henry Danger; Brooklyn Nine-Nine

Winston Story is an American actor who is best known for his work in Grey's Anatomy, Henry Danger and Brooklyn Nine-Nine.

== Personal life ==
He is of Filipino, Native Hawaiian and Hispanic descent.

== Filmography ==
=== Television ===
| Year | Title | Role | Notes |
|---|---|---|---|
| 1995 | Mighty Morphin Power Rangers | Donais | 3 episodes |
| 1995 | Masked Rider | Robo Rider | 3 episodes |
| 1998 | USA High | Customer | 1 episode |
| 2001 | The X-Files | Bellboy | 1 episode |
| 2001 | Sabrina the Teenage Witch | Joe Fensterblau | 1 episode |
| 2003 | A.U.S.A. | Wedding Coordinator | 1 episode |
| 2003 | Reno 911! | Marijuana Dealer | 1 episode |
| 2003 | Miss Match | Oxford Shirt | 1 episode |
| 2004 | That '70s Show | Dennis | 1 episode |
| 2005 | Hot Properties | Man (uncredited) | 1 episode |
| 2006 | Dexter | Messenger | 1 episode |
| 2007–2009 | Grey's Anatomy | Intern Leo | 19 episodes |
| 2009 | 24 | Hale | 1 episode |
| 2009 | Desperate Housewives | John | 1 episode |
| 2010 | NCIS: Los Angeles | Eddie Fisk | 1 episode |
| 2011 | Victorious | Sgrodis | 1 episode |
| 2013 | Rules of Engagement | Usher | 1 episode |
| 2013 | Booked It! | Dustin | 1 episode |
| 2013 | Film Pigs | Redneck | 2 episodes |
| 2014 | Criminal Minds | Dr. Garnett Packard | 1 episode |
| 2014 | Gang Related | Lab Tech | 1 episode |
| 2014–2019 | You're the Worst | Wallace | 4 episodes |
| 2014–2020 | Henry Danger | Trent Overunder | 33 episodes |
| 2015 | Days of Our Lives | Wally | 2 episodes |
| 2016 | NCIS | Manny | 1 episode |
| 2016 | The Goldbergs | Airline Employee | 1 episode |
| 2016 | Angel from Hell | Husband | 1 episode |
| 2016 | Henry Danger Motion Comic | Trent Overunder (voice) | 1 episode |
| 2016–2021 | Brooklyn Nine-Nine | Bill Hummertrout | 7 episodes |
| 2017 | The Middle | OWP Guy | 1 episode |
| 2018 | The Adventures of Kid Danger | Trent Overunder (voice) | 4 episodes |
| 2019 | Will & Grace | Rex | 1 episode |
| 2019 | Mom | Dane | 1 episode |
| 2019 | It's Always Sunny in Philadelphia | Nurse | 1 episode |
| 2020 | Broke | Charles | 1 episode |
| 2020–2023 | Danger Force | Trent Overunder | 36 episodes |
| 2021 | United States of Al | Eric | 1 episode |
| 2022 | Young Sheldon | Nelson | 1 episodes |
| 2023 | Perry Mason | Elmer Denning | 1 episode |

=== Film ===
| Year | Title | Role | Notes |
|---|---|---|---|
| 2003 | A Whiter Shade of Loud | Jeevdot | Short film |
| 2007 | Live! | Camouflage Guy | |
| 2010 | Killers | Eurocreep | |
| 2013 | 7 Day Gig | Jay | Short film |
| 2015 | Miracle Maker | Desperate Case | Short film |
