= Judy Company =

Judy Company is a geotechnical engineering firm located in Kansas City, Kansas. It was founded in 1922 by a geological engineer named Philip S. Judy, using the name Air Made Well Company.

== History ==
Phillip Judy started his professional career as an investigator for Missouri civic engineering projects. He made his reputation by being an early pioneer of foundation consolidation (soil) by pressure grouting.

The company began its reputation as a notable engineering firm when they were contracted to perform the foundation work for Bagnell Dam on the Osage River in central Missouri. Bagnell Dam was completed in 1931 and is one of two operational hydroelectric power plants in the State of Missouri, the other being Taum Sauk Hydroelectric Power Station. Bagnell Dam formed a fresh water reservoir named Lake of the Ozarks, which, at the time, was one of the largest Man-made lakes on the planet. The foundation and dam structure was engineered to retain 646,000,000,000 US gal.

In 1966 the company was incorporated as the Judy Company, Inc.

== Technological Developments ==
The Judy Company developed "Cell-A-Fill" back fill material. It is a by-product of western coal, and is a self-supporting material that will conform to irregular surfaces without compaction. It is made of water, Class "C" fly ash, and foaming and reactive agents.
