= Bloodfist (disambiguation) =

Bloodfist may refer to any of the following motion pictures:

- Bloodfist
- Bloodfist II
- Bloodfist III: Forced to Fight
- Bloodfist IV: Die Trying
- Bloodfist V: Human Target
- Bloodfist VI: Ground Zero
- Bloodfist VII: Manhunt
- Bloodfist VIII: Trained to Kill
