= Suicide squad =

Suicide Squad is a fictional organization featured in DC Comics books.

Suicide Squad may also refer to:

== Arts ==
=== Films ===
- Suicide Squad (1935 film), an American film directed by Raymond K. Johnson
- Suicide Squad (2016 film), a 2016 American superhero film written and directed by David Ayer
  - Suicide Squad (soundtrack), the soundtrack album for the 2016 film
- Suicide Squad: Hell to Pay, a 2018 American superhero animated cartoon film
- The Suicide Squad (film), a 2021 American superhero film written and directed by James Gunn
  - The Suicide Squad (soundtrack), the soundtrack album for the 2021 film
- Suicide Squadron, the American title for the 1941 British film Dangerous Moonlight

=== Television ===
- Suicide Squad Isekai, a 2024 animated TV series
- Suicide Squad (Arrowverse), a fictional organization appearing in the Arrowverse television franchise
  - "Suicide Squad" (Arrow episode), the name of an episode of Arrow
- "Suicide Squad" (Brooklyn Nine-Nine), the sixth season finale of Brooklyn Nine-Nine

=== Video games ===
- Suicide Squad: Kill the Justice League, an action shooter video game developed by Rocksteady Studios

=== Comics ===
- "The Suicide Squad" (Frew), a 1952 comic book published in Australia by Frew

== Politics ==
- Suicide squad (New Zealand), 25 politicians appointed in 1950 to help abolish their own legislative council
- Suicide squad, the members of the former Queensland Legislative Council who voted for its abolition

== Other ==
- Members of a suicide mission
- A nickname for certain members of the Guggenheim Aeronautical Laboratory
  - The founders of the Jet Propulsion Laboratory (JPL)
- Suicide Squad (hooligan firm), association football hooligan firm linked to Burnley F.C.

== See also ==
- Suicidal Tour
