= The Takeback =

- Brooklyn Nine-Nine episode
- Episode no.: Season 7 Episode 8
- Directed by: Michael McDonald
- Written by: Dewayne Perkins
- Cinematography by: Rick Page
- Editing by: Ryan Neatha Johnson
- Production code: 708
- Original air date: March 19, 2020
- Running time: 21 minutes

Guest appearances
- Craig Robinson as Doug Judy; Nicole Byer as Trudy Judy; Mark Cuban as himself; Omar Adam as Nathan; Erik Alvarez as SWAT Guy; Ty Barnett as Josh; Joshua Dov as Shane Broadman; Rob James as Chuck; Andrea Lareo as Georgina

Episode chronology
← Previous "Ding Dong"	Next → "Dillman"
- Brooklyn Nine-Nine season 7

"The Takeback" is the 8th episode of the seventh season of the American television police sitcom series Brooklyn Nine-Nine, and the 138th overall episode of the series. The episode was written by Dewayne Perkins and directed by Michael McDonald. It aired on March 19, 2020, on NBC.

The show revolves around the fictitious 99th precinct of the New York Police Department in Brooklyn and the officers and detectives that work in the precinct. In this episode, Jake is invited to Doug Judy's bachelor party in Miami but the party soon turns into a mission when they find out that Judy's friends made a heist while in the hotel and they have to pull a "reverse heist" to avoid problems. Meanwhile, Holt returns as the Captain of the precinct but Terry loses an important business card while the rest of the precinct debates on getting a new vending machine.

According to Nielsen Media Research, the episode was seen by an estimated 2.32 million household viewers and gained a 0.7 ratings share among adults aged 18–49. The episode received generally positive reviews from critics, who praised Samberg's and Robinson's chemistry.

== Plot ==
Jake (Andy Samberg) discovers through a criminal that Doug Judy (Craig Robinson) is getting married and he didn't even invite him to the wedding. He confronts Judy about this and he explains that he didn't invite him because his criminal friends wouldn't be comfortable with a cop in the wedding. To compensate this, Judy invites him to his bachelor party in Miami but Jake will have to pose as a criminal.

Jake meets Judy's friends, which include Mark Cuban. In Miami, they run into trouble when they find that Judy's sister, Trudy (Nicole Byer), was released from jail and she nearly blows Jake's cover although they buy her silence. However, Judy's gang reveals that they stole $10 million worth of diamonds from a Russian. With Jake's cover blown, Judy decides that the best option is to make a "reverse heist" and return the diamonds before the Russian finds out. Working with Judy's gang, Jake manages to return the original diamonds. However, Jake calls the Miami police and they arrest Judy's criminal friends for stealing the original diamonds. This disappoints Judy, who refuses to let Jake go back to New York on his private jet. Back in the precinct, Jake receives a wedding invitation from Judy, who tells him that his bride is a judge and didn't want his friends at the wedding so he orchestrated the bachelor party so Jake could arrest his friends. He then asks Jake to be his best man at the wedding, which he accepts.

Meanwhile, Holt (Andre Braugher) is back as the Captain but discovers that his business card on his desk was thrown away and tells Terry (Terry Crews) to find it, not knowing Terry was the one who threw it away. Terry and Rosa replace the card with a new one. Nevertheless, Holt finds out the original one was thrown away, as the new one does not have a message on the back. The card was from a person he couldn't help and the card was a reminder of his failure. To compensate, Terry and Rosa (Stephanie Beatriz) get him the cards of people he actually helped to motivate him. Amy (Melissa Fumero), Boyle (Joe Lo Truglio), Hitchcock (Dirk Blocker), and Scully (Joel McKinnon Miller) explore their options for a third vending machine. They eventually find one but it quickly gets pulled after causing a major blackout in the precinct. Boyle then reveals to Hitchcock and Scully the advantage of not having a third machine: they can punch the machine to get free items.

== Reception ==
=== Viewers ===
According to Nielsen Media Research, the episode was seen by an estimated 2.32 million household viewers and gained a 0.7 ratings share among adults aged 18–49. This means that 0.7 percent of all households with televisions watched the episode. This was a 9% increase over the previous episode, which was watched by 2.12 million viewers and a 0.6 ratings share. With these ratings, Brooklyn Nine-Nine was the fourth highest rated show on NBC for the night behind Will & Grace, Superstore and NBC News, fifth on its timeslot and ninth for the night, behind Will & Grace, A Million Little Things, a Young Sheldon rerun, Superstore, NBC News, Last Man Standing, Station 19, and Grey's Anatomy.

=== Critical reviews ===
"The Takeback" received generally positive reviews from critics. LaToya Ferguson of The A.V. Club gave the episode a "B−" rating, writing, "Brooklyn Nine-Nine does attempt to make up for that choice, in a way, by including a long-established recurring character in the form of Craig Robinson's Doug Judy, the scoundrel and 'best friend' of Jake Peralta. You know, it's easy to just chill when you're chilling with your favorite bro. But unfortunately, 'The Takeback' doesn’t exactly rank high on the list of Doug Judy appearances, and the other plots in the episode range from filler to oddly-timed."

Alan Sepinwall of Rolling Stone wrote, "The premise of this was sound and could have still been fairly compact even as more time was given to Jake and Doug's Miami misadventure. Here, though, we basically got the idea itself and not much else. Like the rest of 'The Takeback,' it works better in theory than reality." Nick Harley of Den of Geek gave it a 4 star rating out of 5 and wrote, "It doesn't matter. Not even some half-baked side plots could keep me from feeling a bit sunnier during this episode, and what more are sitcoms supposed to do? They're supposed to feel comfortable, they're supposed to feel like hangout sessions with familiar friends. Doug Judy and Jake's silly pop culture references made me forget for a minute that I haven't left my house since Monday. That's a successful episode of Brooklyn Nine-Nine in my book."
