= Brooklyn Nine-Nine season 7 =

Brooklyn Nine-Nine
- Season 7
- DVD cover
- Starring: Andy Samberg; Stephanie Beatriz; Terry Crews; Melissa Fumero; Joe Lo Truglio; Dirk Blocker; Joel McKinnon Miller; Andre Braugher
- No. of episodes: 13

Release
- Original network: NBC
- Original release: February 6 – April 23, 2020

Season chronology
- ← Previous; Season 6 Next → Season 8

The seventh season of the television sitcom Brooklyn Nine-Nine premiered on February 6, 2020 on NBC and concluded on April 23, 2020. It is the second season to air on NBC (whose partner studio Universal Television produces the show), after the series was canceled on May 10, 2018 by Fox; the season consists of 13 episodes.

== Summary ==
Holt struggles with adjusting to his demotion to a patrol officer. He eventually returns to his captain position after the unexpected death of his rival, Madeline Wuntch. Jake and Amy decide to start trying to have a baby and eventually find out that they're expecting after struggling to conceive for six months. Charles is accepted into one of Holt's new task forces. For the first time in the precinct's history, the Halloween Heist produces a three-time winner after Rosa wins the Halloween, Valentine's Day, and Easter Heists.

Brooklyn experiences a blackout on the night Amy's water breaks. Amy manages to successfully lead blackout protocols while Jake and Charles stop a group of bank robbers that caused the city-wide chaos. With help from their colleagues, Jake manages to make it to Amy just as she gives birth to their son, McClane "Mac" Peralta-Santiago.

== Cast ==
=== Main ===
- Andy Samberg as Detective Jake Peralta
- Stephanie Beatriz as Detective Rosa Diaz
- Terry Crews as Lieutenant Terry Jeffords
- Melissa Fumero as Sergeant Amy Santiago
- Joe Lo Truglio as Detective Charles Boyle
- Dirk Blocker as Detective Michael Hitchcock
- Joel McKinnon Miller as Detective Norm Scully
- Andre Braugher as Captain Raymond Holt

=== Recurring ===
- Vanessa Bayer as Officer Debbie Fogle
- Kenny Stevenson as Officer Mark

=== Guest ===
- Nicole Bilderback as Julie Kim
- Jason Mantzoukas as Adrian Pimento
- Jim Rash as Dr. Jones
- Paul Welsh as Brad Portenburg
- Christine Estabrook as Margaret Fogle
- Neil Campbell as Larry Britches
- Anna Bogomazova as Anna Rubov
- Kyra Sedgwick as Madeline Wuntch
- Antonio Raul Corbo as Nikolaj Boyle
- Michael McDonald as Adam Jarver
- Craig Robinson as Doug Judy
- Nicole Byer as Trudy Judy
- Mark Cuban as himself
- J. K. Simmons as Frank Dillman
- Bradley Whitford as Roger Peralta
- Martin Mull as Walter Peralta
- Will Hines as Carl Kurm
- Winston Story as Bill Hummertrout
- Kyle Bornheimer as Teddy Ramos
- Marc Evan Jackson as Kevin Cozner
- Matthew Bellows as Frank Kingston
- Jon Gabrus as Curt
- Ellie Reed as Kayla
- Merrick McCartha as Frank Murwin

== Episodes ==
Season 7 episodes
No. overall	No. in season	Title	Directed by	Written by	Original release date	Prod. code	U.S. viewers (millions)
131	1	"Manhunter"	Cortney Carrillo	David Phillips	February 6, 2020	701	2.66
After an assassination attempt on the city councilor, Jake leads a manhunt to find the shooter. He decides to let Holt join the case out of pity for his former captain getting demoted to a patrol officer, but quickly grows frustrated when Holt attempts to upstage him. Amy seeks Rosa's help when she believes she might be pregnant.
132	2	"Captain Kim"	Luke Del Tredici	Carol Kolb	February 6, 2020	702	1.99
Captain Julie Kim arrives as the new captain of the precinct and invites the detectives to her house for a dinner party. While she appears kind and selfless, Jake and Holt don't trust her based on their previous history with captain replacements and try to find out if she's connected to Wuntch. Charles uses Rosa's jacket to reinvent himself as a rebel. Terry becomes uneasy when he finds out one of the caterers at the party is a former convict he arrested.
133	3	"Pimemento"	Michael McDonald	Justin Noble	February 13, 2020	703	1.79
Adrian Pimento gets Jake and Charles to help find out who is trying to kill him as he suffers from short-term memory loss. During the investigation, Jake struggles to keep a secret about him and Amy from Charles. Meanwhile, the rest of the team tries to find an easy way out of a workplace conflict seminar, only to discover their own personal conflicts with each other.
134	4	"The Jimmy Jab Games II"	Neil Campbell	Vanessa Ramos	February 20, 2020	704	1.85
In order to prove he is still fun, Jake brings back the Jimmy Jab Games. Boyle oversees proceedings, and uses his position to encourage Debbie out of her shell, with unexpected consequences. Jake and Hitchcock have a bet on who will win, with Jake and Amy's new sedan on the line. Holt deduces that Rosa has a secret agenda for winning and is determined to find out what it is.
135	5	"Debbie"	Claire Scanlon	Marcy Jarreau	February 27, 2020	705	1.74
The detectives arrest Debbie after discovering that she has stolen cocaine and machine guns from the evidence room to give to a notorious crime boss. Believing Debbie's in over her head, Jake convinces Rosa to help him stage an escape so Debbie can lead them to her boss, but the plan quickly turns south when Debbie becomes addicted to the cocaine. Amy and Holt have a speed reading competition while looking through Debbie's old journals.
136	6	"Trying"	Kim Nguyen	Evan Susser & Van Robichaux	March 5, 2020	706	1.82
In an episode that takes place over the course of six months, Jake and Amy struggle to conceive a child and try experimenting with their sex lives. Holt tries to convince Terry to put him on a different beat. Charles and Rosa secretly raise a continuously growing family of guinea pigs in the precinct. Hitchcock quickly finds love after his last divorce.
137	7	"Ding Dong"	Claire Scanlon	Jess Dweck	March 12, 2020	707	2.12
After Madeline Wuntch dies, Holt learns that one of her final requests was for him to host her memorial. Amy and Rosa try to help Holt avoid speaking negatively about his nemesis, so he doesn't put his career at risk, but it proves difficult when they discover Wuntch had another rival. When Jake tells Charles and Terry he has tickets to the premiere of Kwazy Kupcakes: The Movie, the latter two compete to bring their kids to the film. Amy seemingly experiences some side effects from hormones her doctor gave her and eventually finds out that she's pregnant.
138	8	"The Takeback"	Michael McDonald	Dewayne Perkins	March 19, 2020	708	2.32
Doug Judy invites Jake to attend his bachelor party in Miami after Jake complained about not being invited to the wedding. At the hotel, Doug's friends steal $10,000,000 worth of diamonds, forcing Jake and Doug to pull off a "reverse heist" to avoid serious criminal charges. During Holt's first day back as captain, Terry panics after learning that he threw away one of Holt's most valuable possessions. Amy, Charles, Hitchcock, and Scully explore their options for a third vending machine.
139	9	"Dillman"	Kyra Sedgwick	Paul Welsh & Madeline Walter	March 26, 2020	709	2.14
A glitter bomb goes off on Jake's desk and destroys a crucial piece of evidence for an important case. To find out who brought in the bomb, Holt brings in Frank Dillman, one of the best detectives he knows. Jake attempts to find the culprit before Dillman in hopes of convincing Holt to put him on a new task force.
140	10	"Admiral Peralta"	Linda Mendoza	Neil Campbell	April 2, 2020	710	2.06
While preparing for his child's sex reveal party, Jake attempts to mend his father's relationship with his grandfather and break the "father-son curse" his family appears to have. Amy and Rosa try to track down a witness in an important case that Hitchock and Scully were working on. Holt helps Terry prepare for his audition to the NYPD band.
141	11	"Valloweaster"	Matthew Nodella	Luke Del Tredici & Jeff Topolski	April 9, 2020	711	2.04
For the seventh annual Halloween Heist, each of the participants are handcuffed to one partner and try to steal the gems of "The Infinitude Gobbler." The three teams consist of Jake and Holt, Amy and Charles, and Rosa and Scully. However, they are forced to delay it to Valentine's Day and later Easter due to Cheddar and Scully swallowing the gems during the first two attempts. Rosa proves who the "Ultimate Human/Genius" is and reveals she won on all three holidays.
142	12	"Ransom"	Rebecca Asher	Nick Perdue & Beau Rawlins	April 16, 2020	712	2.05
After Cheddar is kidnapped, Jake agrees to help Holt and Kevin rescue their dog. When the kidnapper requests Kevin to come in person, Jake disguises himself as Kevin to avoid putting Holt's husband in danger. Rosa competes against Teddy to win a stroller that Amy has her eyes set on. Charles and Terry attempt to start a side business with Charles's "bone broth".
143	13	"Lights Out"	Dan Goor	Dan Goor & Luke Del Tredici	April 23, 2020	713	2.24
Brooklyn is hit with a borough-wide blackout. With Terry and Holt stuck in the precinct's elevator, Amy takes charge of blackout emergency protocols just as her water breaks. After receiving the news from Rosa, Jake and Charles attempt to make it to the hospital while minimizing the chaos on the streets. Terry tries to alleviate Holt's fear of elevators by teaching him some hip-hop dance moves. Amy is forced to give birth in the precinct with help from Rosa, Hitchcock, and Scully. Jake manages to make it in time thanks to Charles reluctantly getting help from Lieutenant Peanut Butter. After getting transferred to a hospital, Jake and Amy introduce their colleagues to their son, McClane "Mac" Peralta-Santiago.

== Production ==
On February 27, 2019, NBC renewed the series for a seventh season. The season consists of 13 episodes.

== Broadcast ==
The season premiered as a mid-season replacement in the middle of the 2019–20 television season from February 6, 2020.

== Reception ==
=== Critical response ===
The seventh season received mostly positive reviews, with many praising the humor and police work, although some found the season to be a rehash of the first five seasons.

=== Ratings ===
Viewership and ratings per episode of Brooklyn Nine-Nine season 7
No.	Title	Air date	Rating (18–49)	Viewers (millions)	DVR (18–49)	DVR viewers (millions)	Total (18–49)	Total viewers (millions)
1	"Manhunter"	February 6, 2020	0.7	2.66	TBD	TBD	TBD	TBD
2	"Captain Kim"	February 6, 2020	0.5	1.99	TBD	TBD	TBD	TBD
3	"Pimemento"	February 13, 2020	0.5	1.79	TBD	TBD	TBD	TBD
4	"The Jimmy Jab Games II"	February 20, 2020	0.6	1.85	TBD	TBD	TBD	TBD
5	"Debbie"	February 27, 2020	0.5	1.74	TBD	TBD	TBD	TBD
6	"Trying"	March 5, 2020	0.6	1.82	TBD	TBD	TBD	TBD
7	"Ding Dong"	March 12, 2020	0.6	2.12	TBD	TBD	TBD	TBD
8	"The Takeback"	March 19, 2020	0.7	2.32	TBD	TBD	TBD	TBD
9	"Dillman"	March 26, 2020	0.6	2.14	TBD	TBD	TBD	TBD
10	"Admiral Peralta"	April 2, 2020	0.5	2.06	TBD	TBD	TBD	TBD
11	"Valloweaster"	April 9, 2020	0.6	2.04	TBD	TBD	TBD	TBD
12	"Ransom"	April 16, 2020	0.6	2.05	TBD	TBD	TBD	TBD
13	"Lights Out"	April 23, 2020	0.6	2.24	TBD	TBD	TBD	TBD
