= A Bucket of Blood (1995 film) =

1995 television film by Michael McDonald

- VHS cover
- Genre: Comedy horror
- Based on: A Bucket of Blood; 1959 film by Charles B. Griffith
- Screenplay by: Brendan Broderick; Michael James McDonald
- Directed by: Michael James McDonald
- Starring: Anthony Michael Hall; Justine Bateman
- Music by: David Wurst; Eric Wurst
- Country of origin: United States
- Original language: English

Production
- Executive producers: Roger Corman; Lance H. Robbins
- Producer: Mike Elliott
- Cinematography: Christopher Baffa
- Editor: Roderick Davis
- Running time: 83 minutes
- Production company: Concorde-New Horizons

Original release
- Network: Showtime
- Release: September 12, 1995

A Bucket of Blood (also known as The Death Artist) is a 1995 American comedy horror television film. A remake of the 1959 film of the same name, it follows the original closely, adapting it to a contemporary setting. The film was directed by comedian Michael McDonald, produced by Roger Corman (who produced and directed the original film), and co-written by McDonald and Brendan Broderick, based on the 1959 screenplay by Charles B. Griffith.

The plot revolves around Walter Paisley (Anthony Michael Hall), a socially awkward busboy working at the Jabberjaw, an alternative coffee house which hosts performance art, poetry readings, and live music. Walter wants to be an artist to impress his co-worker Carla (Justine Bateman), but lacks talent. While attempting to create an original sculpture, he accidentally kills his landlady's cat, and hides the dead animal by covering it in plaster and passing it off as a statue. After being acclaimed as a great artist, Walter begins to commit murder to produce new art.

The cast also includes cameos by David Cross, Paul Bartel, Mink Stole, Jennifer Coolidge, and Will Ferrell, in his film debut. The film premiered on Showtime as the tenth episode of Roger Corman Presents, a series of made-for-cable films produced by Corman.

== Plot ==
At a Los Angeles coffee house called the Jabberjaw, several performance artists vie for the attention of Generation X hipsters, including Maxwell, a poet who declares that "life is nothing but a homeless traveler on the RTD of art", Mayolia, who performs monologues holding a toy monkey, Cuff and Link, a pair of sarcastic photographers who intentionally run over animals and photograph the road kill, and "Stupid Girl", who strips nude on stage while playing cello. Other regular attendants at the cafe include an older rich couple looking for art by new talent, and Lou, an undercover cop trying to bust heroin dealers operating in the cafe.

Working for Leonard are busboy Walter and Italian hostess Carla. To impress Carla, who he has a crush on, Walter tries to produce a clay sculpture of her face, but is unsuccessful due to his lack of talent. He hears his landlady's cat Frankie in the wall, discovering that the animal had been mistakenly plastered into the wall, and attempts to cut it out with a knife, but accidentally kills it.

The next morning, Walter decides to cover up the dead animal with plaster and presents it as a "thing I made" called Dead Cat. The regulars and other artists love the "sculpture", and Mayolia gives Walter a necklace containing a nickel bag of heroin, leading Lou to follow Walter back to his apartment and confront him about it, which ends with Walter killing Lou with his frying pan, later deciding to hide the body in plaster and call it "Murdered Man". Leonard, having discovered the dead animal in Walter's first "statue", initially tries to call the police upon hearing about "Murdered Man", but covers up the murder, when a customer offers Leonard a large amount of money for "Dead Cat". At a party for Walter, Alice, who had not been aware of Walter's popularity, insults him, but agrees to pose for his nude statue. At his apartment, Alice taunts Walter, suggesting he is a virgin, and he strangles her to death.

Walter reveals his true feelings for Carla at an art show, only for her to tell him that she doesn't love him, and he immediately asks her to model for him. However, she discovers Walter's dark nature when she finds Alice's body in the nude "sculpture", and runs away from Walter upon learning that he plans to murder her next. Once art critics begin commenting on the "brilliance" of a "creation within a creation", Lou's police partner breaks apart the "statues", revealing the corpses. The officer, along with Walter's friends, run after Walter and Carla, realizing that the artist is a murderer, and, realizing that he is about to be caught, Walter mixes a new batch of plaster, and the cop breaks down the door, revealing to the group that Walter has spattered his body with plaster and hanged himself. The experience leaves Carla mute, Leonard to burn down the Jabberjaw for insurance money and Maxwell to unsuccessfully imitate Walter's "suicide art", dying in the process. Cuff and Link, who always criticized Walter's art and accused him of fraud, finally become successful artists themselves, and live together as roommates, while Mayolia becomes the host of a successful children's television show.

== Cast ==
- Anthony Michael Hall as Walter Paisley
- Justine Bateman as Carla
- Shadoe Stevens as Maxwell
- Sam Lloyd as Leonard
- Jesse D. Goins as Art
- Kin Shriner as Lou
- Sheila Travis as Mayolia
- David Cross as Charlie
- Victor Wilson as Cuff
- Patrick Bristow as Link
- Paul Bartel as Older Man
- Mink Stole as Older Woman
- Julianna McCarthy as Mrs. Swicker
- Will Ferrell as Young Man
- Alan Sues as Art Buyer
- Darcy DeMoss as Alice
- Jennifer Coolidge as Stupid Girl
- Stephen Burrows as Carpenter
- Jim Jackson as Art Critic
- Jennifer Joyce as Woman at Show (as Jennifer Judith Joyce)
- Michael James McDonald as Dancer
- Jim Wise as Guitar Player / Singer
- Tracy Grundland as Art Dealer
- Scott P. Levy as Slezy Agent #1
- Brendan Broderick as Slezy Agent #2
- Matthew Rever as Slezy Agent #3
- Deena Casiano as The Violinist
- Markus Reinhardt as The Cellist

== Production ==
Anthony Michael Hall was cast because of his roles in the Brat Pack films of the 1980s. "That's what people identify him with, for better or worse", said associate producer Darin Spillman. "We were remaking a 1950s film and wanted someone identified with a new generation."

== Reception ==
Joe Bob Briggs gave the film four stars, saying, "They hardly changed the flick at all. It's the same goldurn movie." AllMovie's Fred Beldin wrote, "Although executive producer Corman was probably pleased to see his work refashioned with the gratuitous gore and nudity he couldn't use the first time around, Death Artist is fairly pointless."
