= Lights Out (Brooklyn Nine-Nine) =

- Brooklyn Nine-Nine episode
- Episode no.: Season 7 Episode 13
- Directed by: Dan Goor
- Written by: Dan Goor & Luke Del Tredici
- Cinematography by: Rick Page
- Editing by: Jason Gill
- Production code: 713
- Original air date: April 23, 2020
- Running time: 21 minutes

Guest appearances
- Jon Gabrus as Fireman Curt; Jill Bassey as Dottie; Seth Carr as Young Holt; Lisa Gilroy as Briane; Jason Jin as Officer Rick; Carie Kawa as Samantha; Kenzo Lee as Julian; Brendan McNamara as Russ; Toyin Moses as Officer Maria; Ellie Reed as Kayla

Episode chronology
← Previous "Ransom"	Next → "The Good Ones"
- Brooklyn Nine-Nine season 7

"Lights Out" is the 13th episode and season finale of the seventh season of the American television police sitcom series Brooklyn Nine-Nine, and the 143rd overall episode of the series. The episode was written by series co-creator Dan Goor and executive producer Luke Del Tredici and directed by Goor. It aired on April 23, 2020, on NBC.

The show revolves around the fictitious 99th precinct of the New York Police Department in Brooklyn and the officers and detectives that work in the precinct. In this episode, the Brooklyn borough experiences a blackout, which causes the precinct to go into panic mode, not only because they have to protect the city without technology but also because Amy's water starts breaking.

According to Nielsen Media Research, the episode was seen by an estimated 2.24 million household viewers and gained a 0.6 rating share among adults aged 18–49. The episode received very positive reviews from critics, who praised the cast's performances and ending.

== Plot ==
Amy (Melissa Fumero) prepares to take a three-month maternity leave when the Brooklyn borough suffers a blackout, causing chaos in the streets. Holt (Andre Braugher) and Terry (Terry Crews) end up trapped in the elevator, which prevents them from initiating the blackout protocol so Amy has to do it in their place.

Jake (Andy Samberg) and Boyle (Joe Lo Truglio) have to patrol the streets and catch a criminal. During this, Amy's water breaks and Rosa (Stephanie Beatriz) calls Jake to inform him, although he and Boyle are stuck in traffic and also have to constantly defend civilians and take perps to the precinct. They decide to drop the car off and go on a street trolley. They find that one of the criminals they are taking is responsible for the blackout, as a crew intends to rob all of the area's banks. They manage to catch the criminals and restore power to the borough. During this, Rosa pushes aside her discomfort with childbirth to help Amy, and Terry teaches Holt hip-hop dance moves to distract him from being trapped in the elevator.

Amy starts to go into labor in the break room as there is not enough time to reach the hospital. Hitchcock (Dirk Blocker) and Scully (Joel McKinnon Miller) then let Amy use their bed that they used in another room to give birth while Holt and Terry show Amy their dance routine to keep her distracted during the delivery. Jake and Boyle realize they won't reach the precinct in time with the trolley so Boyle reluctantly calls Lieutenant Peanut Butter, the horse who upstaged him during his Medal of Valor ceremony, to help Jake reach the precinct. Jake arrives in time and with Rosa's and a firefighter's help, Jake and Amy's child is born. At the hospital, the squad meets Amy and Jake's son, McClane "Mac" Peralta-Santiago before checking out Holt and Terry's dance that Rosa recorded on her phone.

== Reception ==
=== Viewers ===
According to Nielsen Media Research, the episode was seen by an estimated 2.24 million household viewers and gained a 0.6 rating share among adults aged 18–49. This means that 0.6 percent of all households with televisions watched the episode. This was a 9% increase over the previous episode, which was watched by 2.05 million viewers and had a 0.6 ratings share. With these ratings, Brooklyn Nine-Nine was the third highest rated show on NBC for the night behind Superstore and Law & Order: Special Victims Unit, sixth on its timeslot and eighth for the night, behind Broke, a Young Sheldon rerun, Superstore, Law & Order: Special Victims Unit, Last Man Standing, Man with a Plan, and the 2020 NFL draft.

=== Critical reviews ===
"Lights Out" received very positive reviews from critics. LaToya Ferguson of The A.V. Club gave the episode a "B" rating, writing, "'Lights Out' wasn't the best episode of this season, but it was able to take its predictable sitcom plots and prove that they can still work in a contemporary context, even if you continue to play them straight. Major credit goes to the cast for their delivery of this material but it also goes to Goor and Del Tredici for understanding what makes these plots work and the necessary beats for breathing some energetic life into them. And despite the simpleness of the plots themselves, this couldn't have been an easy episode to shoot because of the blackout and nighttime components of it all."

Alan Sepinwall of Rolling Stone wrote, "Perhaps best of all, under these strange circumstances in which the episode airs, there’s no cliffhanger of any kind, not even a relatively low-stakes one like Holt’s demotion. With the world still mostly frozen, it’s unclear when TV shows will be allowed to resume production, let alone when the traditional broadcast network's 'midseason' will start. So it could be quite a while before we get to return to the Nine-Nine. With the series again finding a way to age oh-so-gracefully, that wait might feel very long. But 'Lights Out' offered the kind of warmth and silliness that feels right to pause on, until whenever the series, and life, can return to something resembling normalcy." Nick Harley of Den of Geek gave it a 4.5 star rating out of 5 and wrote, "Brooklyn Nine-Nine wasn't always perfect this year, but it hit the mark more often than not. 'Lights Out' made the most of its supporting cast while relying on the leads to sell the emotional beats. It also featured Holt dancing to 'Push It' and honestly, what's better than that?"
