= Manhunt =

Manhunt may refer to:

== Search processes ==
- Manhunt (law enforcement), a search for a dangerous fugitive
- Manhunt (military), a search for a high-value target by special operations forces or intelligence agencies

== Social organisations ==
- Manhunt (social network), an online dating service for gay men
- Manhunt International, an international beauty pageant for men, begun 1993

== Sport ==
- Manhunt (urban game), the name of a number of variations on the game of tag

== Media ==
=== Television ===
==== Series ====
- Manhunt (1959 TV series), a syndicated crime show, starring Victor Jory
- Manhunt (1969 TV series), a drama set in World War II
- Manhunt (2001 TV series), a reality TV on UPN
- Manhunt (2004 TV series), a model competition
- Manhunt (2017 TV series), an American anthology drama series
- Manhunt (2019 TV series), an ITV drama series about the investigations that caught Levi Bellfield and Delroy Grant
- Manhunt (miniseries), a 2024 Apple TV+ miniseries about John Wilkes Booth
- Manhunt – Solving Britain's Crimes, on ITV starting 2006
- Lone Target, a reality TV, a.k.a. Manhunt, 2014

==== Episodes ====
- "Manhunt" (Captain Scarlet), 1967
- "Man Hunt" (Dad's Army), 1969
- "Manhunt" (Due South)
- "Manhunt" (Highlander)
- "Manhunt" (Prison Break)
- "Manhunt" (Star Trek: The Next Generation)
- "Manhunt" (Under the Dome)
- "Manhunt" (The Unit)

=== Film ===
- The Man Hunt, a 1918 American comedy drama film directed by Travers Vale
- Man Hunt (1933 film), a mystery film directed by Irving Cummings
- Man Hunt (1936 film), a comedy film directed by William Clemens
- Man Hunt (1941 film), directed by Fritz Lang
- Man Hunt (1985 film), a Western film directed by Fabrizio De Angelis
- Manhunt (1972 film), also known as The Italian Connection (La mala ordina), a crime film directed by Fernando di Leo
- Kimi yo Fundo no Kawa o Watare, a 1976 Japanese film also known as Manhunt
- Manhunt (2008 film), a Norwegian horror film
- Manhunt (2017 film), directed by John Woo, a remake of Kimi yo Fundo no Kawa o Watare
- Manhunt (2026 film), a Canadian crime drama film directed by Wayne Wapeemukwa
- The Manhunt, or Manhunt in the City, a 1975 Italian film
- Manhunt: The Search for Bin Laden, a 2013 documentary directed by Greg Barker about the hunt for bin Laden
- Bloodfist VII: Manhunt, a 1995 action-adventure film starring Don Wilson
- Manhunt: Luigi Mangione and the CEO Murder - A Special Edition of 20/20, a 2024 documentary

=== Video game ===
- Manhunt (video game), a 2003 video game published by Rockstar Games
- Manhunt 2, a 2007 sequel to the above

=== Other media ===
- Manhunt: The Ten-Year Search for Bin Laden From 9/11 to Abbottabad, a 2012 book by journalist Peter Bergen
- Manhunt: The 12-Day Chase for Lincoln's Killer, a 2007 book by James L. Swanson
- "Manhunt", a song by Karen Kamon from the 1983 film Flashdance
- "Manhunt", a 2003 song by Winnebago Deal on the album Plata O Plomo
- Manhunt (novel), a 2022 sci-fi horror novel by Gretchen Felker-Martin
- Minecraft Manhunt, a web series by YouTuber Dream

== See also ==
- Manhunter (disambiguation)
- Human-hunting, the hunting and killing of human beings for other people's revenge, pleasure, entertainment, sports, or sustenance
