= Manhunter =

Manhunter or Man Hunter may refer to:

== Film ==
- The Man Hunter (1919 film), an American silent western directed by Frank Lloyd
- The Man Hunter (1930 film), an American Rin-Tin-Tin film directed by D. Ross Lederman
- The Man Hunter (1980 film), or Devil Hunter, a horror film directed by Jesús Franco (as "Clifford Brown")
- Manhunter (film), a 1986 adaptation of the 1981 Thomas Harris novel Red Dragon, directed by Michael Mann

== Television ==
- The Manhunter, a 1974 TV series set in the 1930s
- Manhunters: Fugitive Task Force, a 2008 TV series
- Manhunters (TV series), the 2005 British drama which aired on BBC2
- "Manhunter" (Supergirl), a Season 1 episode of American TV Series Supergirl
- "Manhunter" (Brooklyn Nine-Nine), an episode of the seventh season of Brooklyn Nine-Nine

== Games ==
- Manhunter, a Sierra OnLine adventure game series
  - Manhunter: New York, a 1988 adventure game by Sierra Entertainment
  - Manhunter 2: San Francisco
- Manhunter (role-playing game), a tabletop role-playing game

== Literature ==
- Manhunter (comics), numerous superheroes and villains from DC Comics
  - Manhunter (Mark Shaw)
  - Manhunter (Kate Spencer)
- Manhunters (DC Comics), a fictional robot race in the DC Comics Universe

== See also ==
- Manhunt (disambiguation)
- Man the Hunter, a 1966 symposium
- Martian Manhunter, a DC Comics character
- Sigvard Thurneman (1908–1979), leader of the Sala gang
