= Girlboss (TV series) =

2017 American comedy series

- Genre: Comedy
- Created by: Kay Cannon
- Based on: #Girlboss by Sophia Amoruso
- Starring: Britt Robertson; Ellie Reed; Johnny Simmons; Alphonso McAuley
- Composer: Jeff Cardoni
- Country of origin: United States
- Original language: English
- No. of seasons: 1
- No. of episodes: 13

Production
- Executive producers: Kay Cannon; Charlize Theron; Laverne McKinnon; Beth Kono; Christian Ditter; Sophia Amoruso; Kristen Zolner; Brittney Segal; Jane Wiseman
- Producer: Chrisann Verges
- Production locations: San Francisco; Los Angeles
- Running time: 24–29 minutes
- Production companies: Here We Go; Denver and Delilah Productions

Original release
- Network: Netflix
- Release: April 21, 2017

Girlboss is an American comedy television series created by Kay Cannon. The series was released on Netflix on April 21, 2017. The show was cancelled after one season.

== Synopsis ==
The show is based on Sophia Amoruso's 2014 autobiography #Girlboss, which tells the story of how Amoruso started the company Nasty Gal while working as a campus safety host for San Francisco's Academy of Art University.

== Cast ==
=== Main ===
- Britt Robertson as Sophia Marlowe
- Ellie Reed as Annie, Sophia's best friend
- Johnny Simmons as Shane, Sophia's love interest
- Alphonso McAuley as Dax, a bartender studying business and Annie's boyfriend

=== Recurring ===
- Dean Norris as Jay Marlowe, Sophia's dad
- RuPaul Charles as Lionel, Sophia's neighbor
- Melanie Lynskey as Gail, the owner of Remembrances and a vintage clothing seller
- Jim Rash as Mobias, the owner of a consignment shop
- Cole Escola as Nathan
- Nicole Sullivan as Teresa
- Louise Fletcher as Rosie, a bitter old lady
- Norm Macdonald as Rick, Sophia's best and last boss
- Amanda Rea as Bettina
- Macedo (Michelle and Melissa) as members of Shane's band
- Alice Ripley as Kathleen, Sophia's mom

== Production ==
In February 2016, it was announced that Netflix had ordered a series based on Amoruso's autobiography #Girlboss. It was announced that the first season received an order of 13 episodes. In June 2016, Britt Robertson joined the cast of the series. That same month, Johnny Simmons, Alphonso McAuley and Ellie Reed joined the cast. In July 2016, Dean Norris joined the cast in a recurring role.

Principal photography took place in San Francisco and Los Angeles.

== Episodes ==
No.	Title	Directed by	Written by	Original release date
1	"Sophia"	Christian Ditter	Kay Cannon	April 21, 2017
In 2006, 23-year-old Sophia Marlowe is fired from her job at a San Francisco shoe store and behind on her rent. When browsing a consignment store, she buys a vintage 1970s motorcycle jacket for nine dollars and sells it on eBay for $600. This gives her the idea to start her own vintage clothing business on eBay.
2	"The Hern"	Christian Ditter	Kay Cannon	April 21, 2017
Sophia has a crisis in confidence when her business hits a bump. She goes to an estate sale to try to find vintage clothing to sell. She discovers she has a hernia, but has no health insurance.
3	"Thank You, San Francisco"	Christian Ditter	Caroline Williams	April 21, 2017
Desperate to come up with a name for her business, Sophia shows Shane around her beloved San Francisco, counting on the city to give her inspiration. She and Shane have differing opinions on whether it is a date or not.
4	"Ladyshopper99"	Steven Tsuchida	Sonny Lee	April 21, 2017
Terrified of getting a bad review on eBay, Sophia goes to great lengths to make sure a vintage wedding dress is fixed and delivered to a high-strung bride in time for the wedding.
5	"Top 8"	Steven Tsuchida	Eben Russell	April 21, 2017
After having a fight with Annie, Sophia reflects on their friendship, including their initial meeting at a San Francisco Giants game and a rocky trip to Coachella.
6	"Five Percent"	John Riggi	Kay Cannon	April 21, 2017
Shane leaves to go on tour. When she finally gets health insurance, Sophia ponders whether to quit her job at the Academy of Art University to focus solely on Nasty Gal.
7	"Long-Ass Pants"	Amanda Brotchie	Jake Fogelnest	April 21, 2017
Gail, the owner of a competing vintage clothing business in Reno, Nevada, comes out to San Francisco to criticize the way Sophia runs her business. Sophia shows her a night on the town and the two end up unexpectedly bonding.
8	"The Trip"	Amanda Brotchie	Joanna Calo	April 21, 2017
Sophia, Annie, and Dax take a road trip to Los Angeles to visit Shane, who is on tour there. The fun, romantic trip goes sour when Sophia and Shane end up fighting about their jobs. Annie and Dax go on a drug trip, prompting a confession from Dax.
9	"Motherfuckin' Bar Graphs"	Jamie Babbit	Jen Braeden	April 21, 2017
Sophia seeks out a rental space for her business. When she needs a co-signer, she is forced to turn to her dad for help. Eager to prove to him that she is a responsible and capable business owner, she enlists Dax's help, but finds that her father does not totally trust her.
10	"Vintage Fashion Forum"	Jamie Babbit	Caroline Williams & Sonny Lee	April 21, 2017
When Annie asks Sophia for a job at Nasty Gal, she gets an unexpected answer. Sophia's competitors plot to take her down.
11	"Garbage Person"	Jamie Babbit	Kay Cannon & Eben Russell	April 21, 2017
When her business hits a major bump, Sophia takes a trip to visit someone from her past.
12	"I Come Crashing"	Christian Ditter	Kay Cannon	April 21, 2017
With the launch date for her website quickly approaching and much work to do, Sophia and Shane begin to grow distant from one another. Sophia stumbles upon a surprising discovery.
13	"The Launch"	Christian Ditter	Kay Cannon	April 21, 2017
Sophia and Annie throw a party to celebrate the launch of the website, but Sophia is distracted by her problems with Shane.

== Reception ==
Review aggregator Rotten Tomatoes gives the first season a 32% rating based on 25 reviews and an average rating of 5.94/10. Metacritic gives the series a score of 53 out of 100, based on 13 critics, indicating "mixed or average reviews".

Some critics criticized the main character's unlikeability, but praised Robertson's portrayal.

Critics were divided as to whether the show presented a feminist message. Jennifer Wright from New York Post called the show a "feminist fraud" because of Sophia's selfishness. On April 18, 2018, Zimbio criticized the show saying it was "like the weird forgotten cousin of Degrassi".
