= Pimemento =

- Brooklyn Nine-Nine episode
- Episode no.: Season 7 Episode 3
- Directed by: Michael McDonald
- Written by: Justin Noble
- Cinematography by: Rick Page
- Editing by: Jason Gill
- Production code: 703
- Original air date: February 13, 2020
- Running time: 21 minutes

Guest appearances
- Jason Mantzoukas as Adrian Pimento; Jim Rash as Dr. Jones; Paul Welsh as Brad Portenburg; Mann Alfonso as Murk; Lanisa Renee Frederick as Gabby Sholah; Ryan de Quintal as Ned

Episode chronology
← Previous "Captain Kim"	Next → "The Jimmy Jab Games II"
- Brooklyn Nine-Nine season 7

"Pimemento" is the 3rd episode of the seventh season of the American television police sitcom series Brooklyn Nine-Nine, and the 133rd overall episode of the series. The episode was written by Justin Noble and directed by Michael McDonald. It aired on February 13, 2020 on NBC.

The show revolves around the fictitious 99th precinct of the New York Police Department in Brooklyn and the officers and detectives that work in the precinct. In this episode, Adrian Pimento asks Jake and Boyle for help in catching someone who tries to kill him while also dealing with amnesia. Meanwhile, the rest of the team tries to find an easy way out of a workplace conflict seminar, only to discover their own personal conflicts with each other.

According to Nielsen Media Research, the episode was seen by an estimated 1.79 million household viewers and gained a 0.5 ratings share among adults aged 18–49. The episode received positive reviews from critics, although commentators were divided on Pimento's character and storyline.

== Plot ==
In the cold open, Jake finds Hitchcock asleep in the break room once again and tries pranking him by tying his shoelaces together. When they check in on him afterwards, they find him somehow choking on his shoelaces tied around his neck.

Jake (Andy Samberg) has reluctantly promised Amy (Melissa Fumero) that he won't tell Boyle (Joe Lo Truglio) that they are trying to get pregnant because of Boyle's tendency to overreact to everything Jake does, and Jake tries to avoid spending time with Boyle so he won't be tempted to tell him. Meanwhile, Adrian Pimento (Jason Mantzoukas) asks Jake and Boyle for help when he thinks he is being targeted by assassins. However, while Pimento is describing his history of events, they deduce that Pimento is suffering what Jake calls Memento disease and everyone else calls Finding Dory disease (anterograde amnesia), failing to remember anything from the past four months except that his most recent client hired him to find evidence of her husband's adultery.

They interview Pimento's doctor, Dr. Jones (Jim Rash), who explains that the numerous head injuries Pimento received during all of his dangerous missions are the cause of his condition and he has prescribed medication. Later, Pimento is shot in the shoulder by an unknown suspect and is taken to the hospital. While visiting him, Jake, desperate to confide in another person about his plans to start a family, tells Pimento, under the assumption that he will forget it immediately, the same way he has forgotten all of his other new memories. But Pimento refers to how Jake will be a good father in front of Boyle, which hurts Boyle's feelings that Jake didn't tell him first.

Jake deduces that Dr. Jones is the husband of Pimento's client trying to cover up Pimento's discovery of his cheating. Jones tries to restrain Pimento in one of the upper rooms of his skyscraper building, but he escapes onto the ledge. Jake and Boyle repair their friendship and help Pimento get back into the office safely. Pimento's full memory finally returns.

Meanwhile, the rest of the precinct is suffering through the annual Human Resources seminar on workplace conflict. Amy obtains a copy of the manual and suggests everyone study it in advance; this results in getting through the seminar in only four hours. But this backfires when told that the seminar must last the allotted six hours and so they will participate in extra activities to use up the remaining time. The extra activity involves the squad talking about their insecurities and soon, everyone turns against each other by mentioning all their flaws. However, they realize that revealing their flaws actually made them better people by trying to make up for everything.

== Reception ==
=== Viewers ===
According to Nielsen Media Research, the episode was seen by an estimated 1.79 million household viewers and gained a 0.5 ratings share among adults aged 18–49. This means that 0.5 percent of all households with televisions watched the episode. This was a 11% decrease over the previous episode, which was watched by 1.99 million viewers and a 0.5 ratings share. With these ratings, Brooklyn Nine-Nine was the third highest rated show on NBC for the night behind Superstore and Law & Order: Special Victims Unit, seventh on its timeslot and thirteenth for the night, behind Outmatched, Deputy, Superstore, A Million Little Things, Last Man Standing, Carol's Second Act, Law & Order: Special Victims Unit, The Unicorn, Mom, Station 19, Grey's Anatomy, and Young Sheldon.

=== Critical reviews ===
"Pimemento" received positive reviews from critics. LaToya Ferguson of The A.V. Club gave the episode a "B+" rating, writing, "Seven seasons in, Brooklyn Nine-Nine is at a high risk of that happening; and the way Season Six had to function as Brooklyn Nine-Nine 101, the show could've fallen right into that trap and possibly remained there heading into this season. In fact, last week's 'Captain Kim' ended up playing on those quirks. But that was in addition to the rest of what these characters are and have become. Three episodes into Season Seven, the writers seem determined to prove that they still have quite a bit of story to tell with these characters. They're doing a good job so far."

Alan Sepinwall of Rolling Stone wrote, "Watching the show toggle between a Pimento story and one about the dynamics of the squad as a whole, it's strange to think there was a brief period where Pimento was an active, ongoing member of this group. As a recurring guest character, he's not quite as essential as the Pontiac Bandit or the Vulture, but 'Pimemento' suggests there's occasionally a place for that man here." Nick Harley of Den of Geek gave the episode a 3 star rating out of 5 and wrote, "While I've mostly been a fan of Adrian Pimento appearances in the past, 'Pimemento' just doesn't quite do it for me. That being said, if you love the energy and unpredictability that the character brings to the mix, you might give this episode higher marks, and that's completely understandable. However, it just feels like a bunch of recycled plot beats we've seen before redesigned ever so slightly. It's fine, but it's no Finding Dory."
