= Denice Duff =

American actress

- Occupations: Actress; director; photographer
- Spouse: Michael Duff
- Children: 1

Denice Duff is an American actress, director, and photographer, who is best known for her roles as Michelle Morgan in Full Moon Features' Subspecies series and as Amanda Browning in the long-running soap opera series The Young and the Restless.

== Career ==
Duff was discovered by manager Jay Bernstein during a Hollywood Talent Search contest. She worked as an office intern in the contest office and the judges convinced her to audition. She was the only actress of 2000 who auditioned that was picked by Mr. Bernstein for representation.

Brought to the William Morris Agency, her first guest-starring role was on Northern Exposure. Other television roles were on Silk Stalkings, Reasonable Doubts, Matlock, Danger Theatre, The Young and The Restless, General Hospital, and Dream On.

Duff's television movies of the week include Double Jeopardy co-starring Bruce Boxleitner and Rachel Ward, and in Robin Cook's Invasion with Rebecca Gayheart and Luke Perry. She also starred in the movie Vampire Resurrection (2001).

Duff has performed on many nationally televised commercials such as the Fruit of the Loom campaign where she was the girl bopping about her bedroom trying to figure out what to wear and then finally flopping on a chair in nothing but her Fruit of the Loom underwear.

Duff has worked in a variety of films and has starred in such low-budget films as Bloodfist V: Human Target, Hell Comes to Frogtown II and Phoenix. She stars in Full Moon Entertainment's Subspecies series, in parts II, III, and IV.

Duff converted her garage into a photography studio and decided to go professional after test-shooting two friends. She has since photographed hundreds of artists, actors and musicians. In 2015 Duff played the mid wife character Wendy on a few episodes of the long running soap opera Days of Our Lives.

== Personal life ==
She is married to Michael Duff, who is a singer and a guitarist in his band Chalk FarM. They have one daughter, Paris Helena Duff, who is a fashion photographer and model.

== Filmography ==
- Meet Me at the Dog Bar - 1990
- The Second Greatest Story Ever Told - 1991
- Northern Exposure - 1991
- Martial Law II: Undercover (video) - 1991
- Reasonable Doubts (TV series) - 1991
- Matlock - 1992
- Silk Stalkings - 1992
- Double Jeopardy (TV movie) - 1992
- Return to Frogtown - 1992
- Dark Vengeance - 1992
- Danger Theatre (TV series) - 1993
- Subspecies 2: Bloodstone (1993)
- Subspecies 3: Bloodlust (1994)
- Phoenix - 1995
- Subspecies 4: Bloodstorm (1998)
- The Silencing (short) - 2000
- The Seventh Sense (short) - 2001
- The Monster Man (video) - 2001
- Heart of Stone - 2001
- Vampire Resurrection - 2001
- CSI:Miami- 2002
- L.A. Twister - 2004
- Gone But Not Forgotten (TV movie) - 2005
- For Heaven's Sake - 2008
- Night of the Living Dead - 2012
- Trophy Heads - 2014
- Days of Our Lives - 2015, 2018
- Codex - 2016
- Subspecies V: Blood Rise - 2023
