= Ransom (Brooklyn Nine-Nine) =

- Brooklyn Nine-Nine episode
- Episode no.: Season 7 Episode 12
- Directed by: Rebecca Asher
- Written by: Nick Perdue & Beau Rawlins
- Cinematography by: Rick Page
- Editing by: Ryan Neatha Johnson
- Production code: 712
- Original air date: April 16, 2020
- Running time: 21 minutes

Guest appearances
- Kyle Bornheimer as Teddy Ramos; Marc Evan Jackson as Kevin Cozner; Matthew Bellows as Frank Kingston; Chris Cordone as Kenneth Turnip; Anderson Davis as Officer Steph Webbelman; Eben Ham as William S. Londman; Maria Pallas as Gloria; Abhi Trivedi as Reggie

Episode chronology
← Previous "Valloweaster"	Next → "Lights Out"
- Brooklyn Nine-Nine season 7

"Ransom" is the 12th episode of the seventh season of the American television police sitcom series Brooklyn Nine-Nine, and the 142nd overall episode of the series. The episode was written by Nick Perdue and Beau Rawlins and directed by Rebecca Asher. It aired on April 16, 2020, on NBC.

The show revolves around the fictitious 99th precinct of the New York Police Department in Brooklyn and the officers and detectives that work in the precinct. In this episode, Cheddar is kidnapped and Jake agrees to help Holt and Kevin rescue their dog. Meanwhile, Rosa competes against Teddy to win a stroller that Amy has her eyes set on. Boyle and Terry attempt to start a side business with Charles's "bone broth".

According to Nielsen Media Research, the episode was seen by an estimated 2.05 million household viewers and gained a 0.6 ratings share among adults aged 18–49. The episode received critical acclaim from critics, who praised Braugher's performance and the climactic fight scene. Braugher was nominated for a Primetime Emmy Award for Outstanding Supporting Actor in a Comedy Series for his performance in the episode.

== Plot ==
In the cold open, Hitchcock and Scully are the only ones at the precinct and make fun of the others for not showing up, only to be informed by Jake wearing a hazmat suit that the building is being fumigated.

Holt (Andre Braugher) and Kevin (Marc Evan Jackson) inform Jake (Andy Samberg) that Cheddar has been kidnapped after a walk in the park. They then receive a list of demands from the kidnapper, which includes evidence from a 2004 case. They deduce the kidnapper is a person who was jailed and recently got released from jail and now wants revenge.

Finding that the kidnapper has connections to a shell company, they receive a call from the kidnapper Frank Kingston (Matthew Bellows), who demands that Kevin deliver evidence files to a location as he doesn't trust Holt. Not wanting to put Kevin in danger, Jake decides to pose as Kevin and takes lessons from Holt and Kevin to learn his mannerisms. At the meeting point, which coincides with the Shakespeare Festival, Jake takes fake files and meets Kingston, who quickly finds he has guns and a fake beard. Jake frees Cheddar but he is kidnapped. Using a GPS in his pants, Holt leads a raid into the warehouse where Jake is being held. Kingston flees with Jake in a car but Holt jumps onto the car roof and then fights Kingston until he knocks him out with Jake exclaiming that was the coolest thing that's ever happened and Holt saying he has done much cooler as his detective days in the 80's and that they made a movie about it with Jake believing Holt was the inspiration behind Passenger 57 and then after Holt says "I'm too old for this crap" Jake becomes excited that the movie was Lethal Weapon.

Meanwhile, Amy is interested in a brand-new stroller for the baby in a contest where she has to maintain contact with the stroller for the longest time. While checking the stroller, she finds her ex-boyfriend Teddy (Kyle Bornheimer), who recently got married and wants the stroller for his baby. As Amy can't compete in the contest due to her pregnancy, Rosa (Stephanie Beatriz) decides to compete for her. With 20 hours into the game, Rosa loses after she can't stop listening to Teddy's stories and Teddy wins the stroller. To compensate for the loss, Rosa decides to buy her another stroller. Boyle (Joe Lo Truglio) presents Terry (Terry Crews) with a family recipe called "Bone Broth", which cures Terry's physical pain. They decide to get in business with the help of Terry's investor friend. But Terry takes out a key ingredient in the broth and causes the jars to explode. His friend decides not to invest but they recoup the budget from their website by selling it to one of Terry's gym friends.

== Reception ==
=== Viewers ===
According to Nielsen Media Research, the episode was seen by an estimated 2.05 million household viewers and gained a 0.6 ratings share among adults aged 18–49. This means that 0.6 percent of all households with televisions watched the episode. This was a slight increase over the previous episode, which was watched by 2.04 million viewers and a 0.6 ratings share. With these ratings, Brooklyn Nine-Nine was the third highest rated show on NBC for the night behind Will & Grace and Law & Order: Special Victims Unit, fifth on its timeslot and tenth for the night, behind Will & Grace, How to Get Away with Murder, Last Man Standing, Law & Order: Special Victims Unit, Broke, Man with a Plan, Young Sheldon, Station 19, and The Disney Family Singalong.

=== Critical reviews ===
"Ransom" received critical acclaim from critics. LaToya Ferguson of The A.V. Club gave the episode an "A−" rating, writing, "'Ransom' isn't a non-stop action episode, but it provides set-up for it to veer into that territory. Once it does, it so clearly excels there too. It obviously goes with more comedic beats to tell the kidnapping story but once it reaches the episode-ending climax, it unleashes the type of cool action ending and fight scene that Brooklyn Nine-Nine just doesn't usually go for."

Alan Sepinwall of Rolling Stone wrote, "'Ransom' gets to have the best of all possible worlds from this trio. Kevin and Holt get to melt down over Cheddar's abduction, making them both — Holt in particular — act more frantically Peralta-esque, while offering a literal role reversal where Jake has to learn to impersonate Kevin." Nick Harley of Den of Geek gave it a perfect 5 star rating out of 5 and wrote, "'Ransom' works on every level. It even gives us a second slo-mo, crosscut intro for Cheddar the Dog. What more can you ask for? I may have cringed at the sight of a hazmat suit at the beginning of the episode (we live in strange times), but otherwise, this was a particularly noiiiice episode of Brooklyn Nine-Nine. Hopefully next week's finale can live up to it!"
