= Valloweaster =

- Brooklyn Nine-Nine episode
- Episode no.: Season 7 Episode 11
- Directed by: Matthew Nodella
- Written by: Luke Del Tredici & Jeff Topolski
- Cinematography by: Rick Page
- Editing by: Jason Gill
- Production code: 711
- Original air date: April 9, 2020
- Running time: 21 minutes

Guest appearances
- Winston Story as Bill Hummerstrout; Gabe Fonseca as Flower Delivery Guy; Matthew Jones as Dr. Millford Cream; Carmella Riley as Dr. Gabbie Wince; Kenny Stevenson as Officer Mark; Becky Wu as Officer Janice; Stephen Wu as Flower Delivery Guy #2

Episode chronology
← Previous "Admiral Peralta"	Next → "Ransom"
- Brooklyn Nine-Nine season 7

"Valloweaster" is the 11th episode of the seventh season of the American television police sitcom series Brooklyn Nine-Nine, and the 141st overall episode of the series. The episode was written by executive producer Luke Del Tredici and Jeff Topolski and directed by Matthew Nodella. It aired on April 9, 2020, on NBC.

The show revolves around the fictitious 99th precinct of the New York Police Department in Brooklyn and the officers and detectives that work in the precinct. In this episode, the squad prepares for the seventh annual Halloween Heist, where they will team up and compete for "The Infinitude Gobbler." However, the Heist proves to be difficult when constant mistakes keep delaying for 6 months.

According to Nielsen Media Research, the episode was seen by an estimated 2.04 million household viewers and gained a 0.6 ratings share among adults aged 18–49. The episode received critical acclaim from critics, who praised the way the series kept momentum going on the seventh heist, writing and Stephanie Beatriz's performance.

== Plot ==
On Halloween 2019, Jake (Andy Samberg) prepares the new Halloween Heist. Again, the participants will be on teams and will be handcuffed to their partner to avoid betrayals. Rosa (Stephanie Beatriz) is partnered with Scully (Joel McKinnon Miller), Amy (Melissa Fumero) is partnered with Boyle (Joe Lo Truglio), and Jake is partnered with Holt (Andre Braugher). Hitchcock (Dirk Blocker) is left out and Terry (Terry Crews) states he will not participate after his win in the previous heist. The winners will receive "The Infinitude Gobbler" and will need to get three "Gems" by midnight to get it, all three gems will be in Bill's (Winston Story) pocket.

Jake confesses to Holt that he rigged the election so he could be with Holt and that Rosa ends up with Scully. And Amy reveals to Boyle that she indirectly suggested the idea of teams to Jake, as she knows Jake and Holt are too stubborn to work with each other. Jake uses a smoke machine to cover the bullpen, which allows them to get the Gems from Bill. However, Jake trips over a chair and the gems fall from his hand. Holt then uses Cheddar to find the Gems but they discover that while he got the gems, Cheddar swallowed them in the process. Seeing that it will take time to get the Gems out, they decide to delay the Heist until the Gems are out and when the squad has a free day.

On Valentine's Day 2020, the Gems are put back in Bill's pocket. A group of florists start arriving and in the chaos, the Gems are taken by Rosa and Scully, who places them in his mouth. But again, the Gems are swallowed and the group waits until Easter Day to continue with the Heist. Due to health concerns, Scully drops out and Rosa, instead of partnering with Hitchcock, is handcuffed to a filing cabinet. Jake and Holt plan to use people in bunny suits to distract everyone while also wearing one but Amy anticipated this as she had her hired actor to fake being Jake's therapist, suggest the idea to Jake. Hence, she and Boyle also dress as bunnies. In the chaos, Rosa manages to get the Gems and jump off the rooftop to a trampoline. She reveals she gave ham to Cheddar throughout the year and had the Heist delayed so everything could work, receiving help from Terry, who felt left out after a while. The reason for the delays were that due to everyone debating on who was leading with 2 wins, Rosa switched the Gems in all three heists, effectively becoming the first person to win thrice. At Rosa's celebration, the squad starts debating the number of times each one has won.

== Reception ==
=== Viewers ===
According to Nielsen Media Research, the episode was seen by an estimated 2.04 million household viewers and gained a 0.6 ratings share among adults aged 18–49. This means that 0.6 percent of all households with televisions watched the episode. This was a slight decrease over the previous episode, which was watched by 2.06 million viewers and a 0.5 ratings share. With these ratings, Brooklyn Nine-Nine was the second highest rated show on NBC for the night behind Will & Grace, fifth on its timeslot and eleventh for the night, behind Will & Grace, How to Get Away with Murder, Tommy, Last Man Standing, Broke, two Man with a Plan episodes, a Young Sheldon rerun, Station 19, and Grey's Anatomy.

=== Critical reviews ===
"Valloweaster" received critical acclaim from critics. LaToya Ferguson of The A.V. Club gave the episode an "A" rating, writing, "The seventh Halloween Heist of the series, 'Valloweaster' works because the script and the characters acknowledge just how much these Heists have reached a point where everyone can pretty much predict everyone else's moves. That makes it difficult in breaking a story to figure out how which character can outsmart the rest of the squad, but it also makes for some variety in a gimmick that could easily get stale."

Alan Sepinwall of Rolling Stone wrote, "Rosa's ham-assisted victory is so overwhelming, it might inspire either the detectives or the writing team to take a break from heists for a while. And now that everyone from the main cast but Boyle has won, it could feel too predictable if he finally takes home the Infinitude Gobbler next year. But I wouldn't put it past the writers to contrive an excuse for Hitchcock and/or Scully to win, or perhaps a recurring character like Kevin or Pimento swooping in to take it. However difficult it may be to put these episodes together, the payoff has almost always been worth it, and 'Valloweaster' is among the best heists the show has pulled off." Nick Harley of Den of Geek gave it a 4.5 star rating out of 5 and wrote, "Maybe a POV Boyle episode where we watch him pull off the heist from his own perspective, a la It's Always Sunny's 'Being Frank,' taking things to ridiculous new lengths, could be an idea. No matter what the Brooklyn Nine-Nine team decides to do, we're on board. It was nice to know one annual event this time of year went on as planned and delivered."
