= The Jimmy Jab Games II =

- Brooklyn Nine-Nine episode
- Episode no.: Season 7 Episode 4
- Directed by: Neil Campbell
- Written by: Vanessa Ramos
- Cinematography by: Rick Page
- Production code: 704
- Original air date: February 20, 2020
- Running time: 21 minutes

Guest appearances
- Vanessa Bayer as Officer Debbie Fogle; Damon Standifer as Alex; Kenny Stevenson as Officer Mark

Episode chronology
← Previous "Pimemento"	Next → "Debbie"
- Brooklyn Nine-Nine season 7

"The Jimmy Jab Games II" is the 4th episode of the seventh season of the American television police sitcom series Brooklyn Nine-Nine, and the 134th overall episode of the series. The episode was written by Vanessa Ramos and directed by Neil Campbell. It aired on February 20, 2020, on NBC.

The show revolves around the fictitious 99th precinct of the New York Police Department in Brooklyn and the officers and detectives that work in the precinct. In this episode, to prove that he is still fun, Jake decides to bring back the "Jimmy Jab Games" where the winner will get a paid day-off.

According to Nielsen Media Research, the episode was seen by an estimated 1.85 million household viewers and gained a 0.6 ratings share among adults aged 18–49. The episode received mostly positive reviews from critics, with many praising Samberg's and Lo Truglio's performances as well as the ending.

== Plot ==
Terry (Terry Crews) and Amy (Melissa Fumero) prepare to attend a voluntary meeting and leave Jake (Andy Samberg) in charge of the precinct. However, one of Terry's remarks hit Jake with the idea that due to his new commitment to having children, Jake is more responsible. This prompts Jake to continue with "The Jimmy Jab Games" to prove he is still fun. Boyle (Joe Lo Truglio) gives up his spot to become the host and enlists Officer Debbie Fogle (Vanessa Bayer) to take his place.

Before the game, Jake makes a bet with Hitchcock (Dirk Blocker): if Jake wins, Hitchcock will do his paperwork for a year; and if Hitchcock wins, he will get Jake's new car, to the shock of Amy and forcing her to stay. The first competition is a meat-throwing challenge, in which Debbie is eliminated due to her allergy to turkey. In the second and third games, which involve Hide-and-seek and a bomb suit race, Scully and Amy are respectively eliminated. Meanwhile, Holt (Andre Braugher) deduces Rosa (Stephanie Beatriz) wants to propose to her girlfriend, but Rosa reveals that she and her girlfriend have actually broken up.

The fourth game has the squad untangle a lamp's cord and plug it in. Jake wins and secures his spot in the final round, but Holt and Rosa reconcile and decide to quit, ensuring Hitchcock advances to the next round. The final game involves a race throughout the precinct and both Jake and Hitchcock are struggling with multiple injuries and pill abuse. Jake is about to win, but he is too physically weak, so Amy injects him with an EpiPen, which fills him with adrenaline and allows him to win the competition. After the games, Boyle consoles Debbie, telling her she can do anything. Boyle's talk motivates Debbie to sneak into the evidence room, where she steals drugs and guns and walks away.

== Reception ==
=== Viewers ===
According to Nielsen Media Research, the episode was seen by an estimated 1.85 million household viewers and gained a 0.6 ratings share among adults aged 18–49. This means that 0.6 percent of all households with televisions watched the episode. This was a slight increase over the previous episode, which was watched by 1.79 million viewers and a 0.5 ratings share. With these ratings, Brooklyn Nine-Nine was the third highest rated show on NBC for the night behind Superstore and Law & Order: Special Victims Unit, sixth on its timeslot and thirteenth for the night, behind A Million Little Things, Carol's Second Act, The Unicorn, Superstore, Law & Order: Special Victims Unit, Last Man Standing, Mom, Station 19, Young Sheldon, and Grey's Anatomy.

=== Critical reviews ===
"The Jimmy Jab Games II" received mostly positive reviews from critics. LaToya Ferguson of The A.V. Club gave the episode an "A−" rating, writing, "'The Jimmy Jab Games II' is chaotic energy from top to bottom in a way that's similar to the Halloween Heist in a way but, again, without the actual strategy behind it. For that reason, it's for the best that it hasn't become a recurring component of the series."

Alan Sepinwall of Rolling Stone wrote, "When there's an unexpected twist in the latest heist, or when a Doug Judy story really clicks, it can feel even more delightful than a regular Nine-Nine episode, because the traditions have built up greater meaning. But when a revisited device mainly fails to live up to the original, it creates the impression that Brooklyn is just playing its greatest hits for lack of any new ideas at this advanced age." Nick Harley of Den of Geek wrote, "'The Jimmy Jab Games II' was a well-paced, fun installment of Brooklyn Nine-Nine where pretty much everyone was given time to shine. I wouldn't be mad if we saw the games return again in Season 8. I'm excited to see how they follow-up with that twist ending and whether Debbie's turn to crime will have any impact on getting Holt restored to Captain, or whether he'll remain a uniformed officer for a little while longer."
