= Double Jeopardy (1992 film) =

1992 television film directed by Lawrence Schiller

- Genre: Thriller
- Written by: Monte Stettin; Craig Tepper
- Directed by: Lawrence Schiller
- Starring: Rachel Ward; Bruce Boxleitner; Sela Ward; Sally Kirkland
- Music by: Eduard Artemyev
- Country of origin: United States
- Original language: English

Production
- Executive producer: Jay Bernstein
- Producers: Jeffrey Morton; Lawrence Schiller
- Cinematography: Robert Carmichael; Peter Sova
- Editor: Paul Dixon
- Running time: 99 minutes

Original release
- Network: Showtime
- Release: November 21, 1992

Double Jeopardy is a 1992 television thriller film directed by Lawrence Schiller and starring Rachel Ward, Bruce Boxleitner, Sela Ward and Sally Kirkland.

== Plot ==
Jack and Lisa are lovers who rock climb together. 10 years later, they encounter each other again by chance in a Salt Lake City supermarket after having gone their separate ways many years earlier. Jack is now a school administrator, who lives with his lawyer wife, Karen, and young daughter and enjoys a wonderful life. Jack invites Lisa to his house for dinner and to meet his family. Soon however Lisa and Jack begin an affair. Later, Lisa kills her current boyfriend in self-defense and Jack witnesses the whole thing. Lisa goes on trial for murder with Karen as her lawyer. As the movie progresses, Lisa's devious side becomes known. Jack is fired from his job because of the scandal. Lisa has a dark side which is discovered but she can not be re-tried for murder when she was really guilty. Jack re-plays the staged crime in his head and figures out that he was set up and the rape was staged. Lisa sets out to climb The Devil's Needle, a famed climbing spot. Jack and Lisa climb the rock by hand, but Lisa falls and hits her head and dangles in mid air. Police show up and you see a yellow tarp covering the dead body of Lisa. Karen finds a map in the trash and drives out to see him. The movie ends with them looking at each other from a distance.

== Cast ==
- Rachel Ward as Lisa Burns Donnelly
- Bruce Boxleitner as Jack Hart
- Sela Ward as Karen Hart
- Sally Kirkland as Detective Phyllis Camden
- Jay Patterson as Assistant District Attorney
- Denice Duff as Shelley Conoway
- Tom Everett as Frank Jameson
- Aaron Eckhart as Dwayne

== Production ==
Parts of the film were shot in Salt Lake City, Highway 279, Rainbow Rocks and Tombstone Butte in Utah.
