= Ding Dong (Brooklyn Nine-Nine) =

- Brooklyn Nine-Nine episode
- Episode no.: Season 7 Episode 7
- Directed by: Claire Scanlon
- Written by: Jess Dweck
- Cinematography by: Rick Page
- Editing by: Jason Gill
- Production code: 707
- Original air date: March 12, 2020
- Running time: 21 minutes

Guest appearances
- Kyra Sedgwick as Chief Wuntch; Antonio Raul Corbo as Nikolaj Boyle; Michael McDonald as Adam Jarver; Jesse James D'Angelo as Jastin; Dani Lockett as Cagney Jeffords; Dannah Lockett as Lacey Jeffords

Episode chronology
← Previous "Trying"	Next → "The Takeback"
- Brooklyn Nine-Nine season 7

"Ding Dong" is the 7th episode of the seventh season of the American television police sitcom series Brooklyn Nine-Nine, and the 137th overall episode of the series. The episode was written by Jess Dweck and directed by Claire Scanlon. It aired on March 12, 2020, on NBC.

The show revolves around the fictitious 99th precinct of the New York Police Department in Brooklyn and the officers and detectives that work in the precinct. In this episode, Wuntch dies and Holt is selected to officiate her memorial but this is part of her plan to destroy his career. Meanwhile, Jake must choose between Terry or Boyle to take one to a movie premiere.

According to Nielsen Media Research, the episode was seen by an estimated 2.12 million household viewers and gained a 0.6 ratings share among adults aged 18–49. The episode received mostly positive reviews from critics, who praised Andre Braugher's performance, writing and ending.

== Plot ==
The precinct is notified that Commissioner Wuntch (Kyra Sedgwick) has died. Unlike the rest of the precinct, Holt (Andre Braugher) reacts happily to the news until he is sent a last video from Wuntch, who says she wants him to organize her memorial. She did this because high-ranking members of the police are going to attend and she set up Holt to speak honestly (meaning with furious anger) about her in front of them, which would thus damage his career.

Holt receives help from Rosa (Stephanie Beatriz) and Amy (Melissa Fumero), with the latter experiencing emotional overdrive, side effects from taking hormones her doctor had prescribed. At the funeral, Holt meets Adam (Michael McDonald), who describes himself as Wuntch's true nemesis, causing Holt to become jealous. The two initially get along but while Holt prepares to make his speech, Adam reveals himself as Wuntch's nephew and plays a video where Holt recites a speech talking crudely about Wuntch. However, Holt reveals that the memorial is not the real one, as he hired the members of local improv troupes to act as NYPD members because he knew Wuntch would have one last trick up her sleeve. At Wuntch's actual memorial, Holt realizes he will actually miss her and that their mutual loathing made them both better officers, and expresses sincere condolences on her death.

Jake (Andy Samberg) says that he has four tickets to the world premiere of Kwazy Kupcakes: The Movie, leading Terry (Terry Crews) and Boyle (Joe Lo Truglio) to try to convince him to take their respective children to the movie. Unsure of whom to choose, Jake has them decide and they both decide to fight in boxing, which ends with both suffering dangerous injuries. This prompts Jake to officially decide: he will take all three children to the movie by himself and leave Terry and Boyle at home, which the two don't end up minding since it means they have a free night away from their kids.

In the last scene, Amy reveals to Jake that the side effects she is experiencing were not in her prescriptions so she contacted the doctor. It is then revealed that Amy is in fact pregnant and she and Jake embrace in happiness. Boyle, sensing this, wakes up in the middle of the night with a start.

== Reception ==
=== Viewers ===
According to Nielsen Media Research, the episode was seen by an estimated 2.12 million household viewers and gained a 0.6 ratings share among adults aged 18–49. This means that 0.6 percent of all households with televisions watched the episode. This was a 16% increase over the previous episode, which was watched by 1.82 million viewers and a 0.6 ratings share. With these ratings, Brooklyn Nine-Nine was the highest rated show on NBC for the night, fifth on its timeslot and ninth for the night, behind Last Man Standing, A Million Little Things, Carol's Second Act, The Unicorn, Mom, Young Sheldon, Station 19, and Grey's Anatomy.

=== Critical reviews ===
"Ding Dong" received mostly positive reviews from critics. LaToya Ferguson of The A.V. Club gave the episode a "B+" rating, writing, "This is a really fast-paced, joke-heavy plot, one that could easily fall apart when it comes to the emotional and storytelling beats. But it doesn't. Andre Braugher deserves plenty of credit for his performance and his uncanny to play and navigate so many beats as such a deadpan character, but Jess Dweck's script also deserves credit for how tight it is when it comes to this plot."

Alan Sepinwall of Rolling Stone wrote, "But what made last week's 'Trying' so potent — and inspired a lot of couples who have struggled with fertility issues to thank the show for doing it — was how plainly it acknowledged that conception can be a struggle for a lot of people. Having that struggle end in literally the very next episode undercuts that message a bit, even though 'Trying' took place over a period of six months for our heroes. Even inserting one extra episode between the two scenes would have significantly reduced the feeling that it ultimately wasn't that hard for Amy and Jake to solve this problem." Nick Harley of Den of Geek gave it a 4.5 star rating out of 5 and wrote, "With a just a minor hiccup at the end, 'Ding Dong' was everything you could want out of Brooklyn Nine-Nine. Maybe it didn't play with the format like last week's episode, but not every outing needs to reinvent the wheel, so long as it stays true to the characters we love with silly and heartfelt stories."
