= Debbie (Brooklyn Nine-Nine episode) =

- Brooklyn Nine-Nine episode
- Episode no.: Season 7 Episode 5
- Directed by: Claire Scanlon
- Written by: Marcy Jarreau
- Cinematography by: Rick Page
- Editing by: Jason Gill
- Production code: 705
- Original air date: February 27, 2020
- Running time: 21 minutes

Guest appearances
- Vanessa Bayer as Officer Debbie Fogle; Christine Estabrook as Margaret Fogle; Zoran Radanovich as Silvio Nucci

Episode chronology
← Previous "The Jimmy Jab Games II"	Next → "Trying"
- Brooklyn Nine-Nine season 7

"Debbie" is the 5th episode of the seventh season of the American television police sitcom series Brooklyn Nine-Nine, and the 135th overall episode of the series. The episode was written by Marcy Jarreau and directed by Claire Scanlon. It aired on February 27, 2020, on NBC.

The show revolves around the fictitious 99th precinct of the New York Police Department in Brooklyn and the officers and detectives that work in the precinct. In this episode, the precinct investigates Debbie after she steals drugs and guns from an evidence room, intending to sell it to a mobster. Jake and Rosa then infiltrate and pretend to be part of the mobster's payroll in order to get his location.

According to Nielsen Media Research, the episode was seen by an estimated 1.74 million household viewers and gained a 0.5 ratings share among adults aged 18–49. The episode received positive reviews from critics, with praise for Vanessa Bayer's guest performance although the writing received some criticism.

== Plot ==
The precinct is under pressure after twenty bricks of cocaine and machine guns from evidence disappear and are sold off. And unknown to everyone in the building, Debbie (Vanessa Bayer) is responsible for this. Despite her attempts to hide her actions, Hitchcock (Dirk Blocker) overhears her confessing to everything in the ladies room and the rest of the squad quickly deduce it from her odd behavior around them.

After arresting her, the squad discovers that she sold the cocaine and guns to a notorious mobster named Silvio Nucci. With Debbie refusing to testify against Nucci, Jake (Andy Samberg) comes up with a plan: a fake escape attempt, hoping it will lead to Nucci. Jake and Rosa (Stephanie Beatriz) pretend to be part of Nucci's gang to get Debbie out of the precinct and she takes them to her hotel room where she has the cocaine and drugs. However, Debbie starts using the cocaine, which complicates the mission. Debbie's shenanigans infuriate Rosa and she decides to blow her cover, but Debbie's cocaine use makes her stronger and she knocks Rosa out and takes them to the mansion where she is meeting Nucci. Meanwhile, in an attempt to investigate Debbie, the squad recovers her many detailed journals, with some even spanning just half a day. The mission soon turns into a competition for Holt (Andre Braugher) and Amy (Melissa Fumero) to see who can win in a speed reading competition.

Jake attempts to get Debbie's burner phone to get information on Nucci but he is tied to a chair along with Rosa and Debbie's mother (Christine Estabrook), who just visited the mansion and saw Debbie's operation. After watching Debbie and her mom argue, Rosa deduces that many of Debbie's poor life choices stemmed from how her parents treated her. She talks to Debbie and acknowledges the similarities to her own struggles, and promises to help her if she will let them go. Nucci arrives and despite Jake and Rosa pointing their guns, he is still not scared until the precinct arrives to arrest him. He tries to escape with Debbie, but she punches him and knocks him unconscious. Debbie is immediately arrested, but Rosa and Jake agree they will help her get a lighter sentence (around ten years with good behavior instead of thirty) by working with her to express remorse and provide full disclosure, thus restoring their own professional relationship.

== Reception ==
=== Viewers ===
According to Nielsen Media Research, the episode was seen by an estimated 1.74 million household viewers and gained a 0.5 ratings share among adults aged 18–49. This means that 0.5 percent of all households with televisions watched the episode. This was a 6% decrease over the previous episode, which was watched by 1.85 million viewers and a 0.6 ratings share. With these ratings, Brooklyn Nine-Nine was the third highest rated show on NBC for the night behind Superstore and Law & Order: Special Victims Unit, seventh on its timeslot and thirteenth for the night, behind Outmatched, a The Unicorn rerun, a Mom rerun, a Tommy rerun, Superstore, Law & Order: Special Victims Unit, Deputy, A Million Little Things, Last Man Standing, a Young Sheldon rerun, Station 19, and Grey's Anatomy.

=== Critical reviews ===
"Debbie" received positive reviews from critics. LaToya Ferguson of The A.V. Club gave the episode a "B+" rating, writing, "'Debbie' is literally a different type of high from 'The Jimmy Jab Games II.' To be perfectly honest, nothing in this episode trumps Boyle's Greatest Showman bit or Debbie's song from that episode. But despite the possibility of being too overwhelming, it's still another hilarious episode of Brooklyn Nine-Nine."

Alan Sepinwall of Rolling Stone wrote, "We're only five episodes in, but that's more than a third of this abbreviated 13-episode season. Hopefully, we start getting some other kinds of stories with Jake, and soon." Nick Harley of Den of Geek gave it a 3.5 star rating out of 5 and wrote, "Brooklyn Nine-Nine has been solid, if not stellar in its seventh season and second on NBC. So far there's been nothing that would crack our list of the all-time best episodes. There's still plenty of time though, and given the show's track record, I'm sure a classic will pop up here soon."
