= Admiral Peralta =

- Brooklyn Nine-Nine episode
- Episode no.: Season 7 Episode 10
- Directed by: Linda Mendoza
- Written by: Neil Campbell
- Cinematography by: Rick Page
- Editing by: Ryan Neatha Johnson
- Production code: 710
- Original air date: April 2, 2020
- Running time: 21 minutes

Guest appearances
- Bradley Whitford as Roger Peralta; Martin Mull as Walter Peralta; Eva La Dare as Brenda Shawnks; Will Hines as ADA Carl Kurm

Episode chronology
← Previous "Dillman"	Next → "Valloweaster"
- Brooklyn Nine-Nine season 7

"Admiral Peralta" is the 10th episode of the seventh season of the American television police sitcom series Brooklyn Nine-Nine, and the 140th overall episode of the series. The episode was written by Neil Campbell and directed by Linda Mendoza. It aired on April 2, 2020, on NBC.

The show revolves around the fictitious 99th precinct of the New York Police Department in Brooklyn and the officers and detectives that work in the precinct. In this episode, Jake attempts to mend his father's relationship with his grandfather and break the "father-son curse" his family appears to have. Meanwhile, Amy and Rosa try to track down a witness in an important case that Hitchock and Scully were working on. Holt helps Terry prepare for his audition to the NYPD band.

According to Nielsen Media Research, the episode was seen by an estimated 2.06 million household viewers and gained a 0.5 ratings share among adults aged 18–49. The episode received generally positive reviews from critics, although some critics expressed disappointment at the lack of resolution for Whitford's and Mull's characters.

== Plot ==
Jake (Andy Samberg) and Amy (Melissa Fumero) announce to the precinct that they're expecting a baby although the squad shows no surprise nor excitement as Amy basically revealed the pregnancy earlier by hiding herself on many suits or items. Jake then meets with his father Roger (Bradley Whitford) to invite him for his child's gender reveal and upon seeing that Roger's relationship with Jake's grandfather is complicated, Jake decides to patch things up between both of them, while also learning of a supposed curse in his family involving fathers and sons, which his father attributes to one of their ancestors drowning his father in a well and abandoning his baby at the World's Fair.

Jake reunites Roger with his grandfather, Admiral Walter Peralta (Martin Mull). But things start awry when Roger calls him the worst father in the world, citing his constant absence in his childhood and blaming Roger for everything. They start bonding by remembering tragedies from other people in their lives. Things start to go well until they accidentally spill the party's cake, whose color reveals the sex of the baby. They attempt to clean it while blindfolded but just worsen the situation by just expanding the cake and finding out that the baby is a boy. They call Boyle (Joe Lo Truglio) to help make a new cake and finish cleaning. But at the reveal party, the cake's color turns out to be green and Roger and Walter yell at each other, which ends with Walter leaving and Roger cutting his thumb off and being taken to the hospital. Jake visits Roger at the hospital and Roger tells him he will be a great dad, as Jake has shown he is more caring than both Roger and Walter. Jake then shows Amy the real sex of the baby, although they know because Scully (Joel McKinnon Miller) ate the cake.

Meanwhile, Amy and Rosa (Stephanie Beatriz) are notified by the DA to give priority to one of their cases as it involves the Mayor. But Amy already gave the case to Hitchcock (Dirk Blocker) and Scully so they investigate in their place. They find a solid lead but the witness can't testify as Hitchcock and Scully didn't write the witness' name or contact. Amy and Rosa angrily confront Scully and Hitchcock for screwing up but are both stunned when Hitchcock tells them that the witness is an illegal immigrant who feared being deported and they refused to turn that information over to ICE. Without any evidence, the case falls apart and the DA angrily tells Amy and Rosa to be strict with Scully and Hitchcock. They decide to suspend them with a one-week suspension with pay, which they're more than fine with. Terry (Terry Crews) asks for Holt's (Andre Braugher) help in practicing the flute for a NYPD band audition, which he reluctantly accepts. But Holt's perfectionist method leads Terry to quit. At the audition, Holt asks the judges to consider Terry for teaching him more about perseverance and not perfectionism. Terry is hired even though he didn't even audition as he is the only one with a flute.

== Reception ==
=== Viewers ===
According to Nielsen Media Research, the episode was seen by an estimated 2.06 million household viewers and gained a 0.5 ratings share among adults aged 18–49. This means that 0.5 percent of all households with televisions watched the episode. This was a slight decrease over the previous episode, which was watched by 2.14 million viewers and a 0.6 ratings share. With these ratings, Brooklyn Nine-Nine was the third highest rated show on NBC for the night behind Law & Order: Special Victims Unit and Superstore, sixth on its timeslot and twelfth for the night, behind How to Get Away with Murder, Law & Order: Special Victims Unit, Tommy, Superstore, Last Man Standing, Man with a Plan, Broke, Mom, Station 19, Young Sheldon, and Grey's Anatomy.

=== Critical reviews ===
"Admiral Peralta" received generally positive reviews from critics. LaToya Ferguson of The A.V. Club gave the episode an "A−" rating, writing, "'Admiral Peralta' is a Brooklyn Nine-Nine episode that loves a sight gag, as well as one that loves to play with flashbacks, flashforwards, and its camera angles and transitions. These are all things in Brooklyn Nine-Nine's bag of tricks already, but Neil Campbell's script allows director Linda Mendoza to have a lot of fun using all of them."

Alan Sepinwall of Rolling Stone wrote, "So, no, neither 'Admiral Peralta' guest star feels especially well used. But the home stretch leans on what makes the regular characters tick, and has some marvelous comic set pieces, and ultimately that's more than enough to make this one of the season's more satisfying episodes." Nick Harley of Den of Geek gave it a 3.5 star rating out of 5 and wrote, "All in all, despite the appearance of Whitford and Mull, this is a pretty unmemorable episode of Brooklyn Nine-Nine. Not bad, not particularly good, just sort of by the numbers. Next week, Brooklyn Nine-Nine's episode is titled 'Valloweaster' promising some sort of Halloween-Heist hybrid episode. Odds are it will be much more satisfying than this installment."
