= The Crazysitter =

- Directed by: Michael McDonald
- Written by: Michael McDonald
- Produced by: Mike Elliott; Roger Corman
- Starring: Beverly D'Angelo; Ed Begley Jr; Carol Kane; Phil Hartman
- Cinematography: Christopher Baffa; Michael Mickens
- Edited by: Robert Barrere
- Music by: David and Eric Wurst
- Production company: The Pacific Trust
- Distributed by: New Horizons; Libra Pictures International
- Release date: December 31, 1994
- Running time: 92 minutes
- Country: United States
- Language: English

The Crazysitter (also known as Two Much Trouble) is a 1994 American comedy film written and directed by Michael McDonald for producer Roger Corman. It was shot in Canada and released direct-to-video on December 31, 1994.

== Plot ==
The film follows Edie (Beverly D'Angelo), an alcoholic ex-convict struggling to adjust after being released from her cozy den in jail. Seeking ways to get money fast, she gets hired as a nanny to babysit the Van Arsdale family's unruly children. While watching television one day, Edie comes across a tabloid talk show hosted by Adrian Wexler-Jones (Lisa Kudrow) where the panelists discuss child selling, which gives her the idea to sell the Van Arsdale kids for a quick profit. However, things don't go quite as she planned.

== Cast ==
- Beverly D'Angelo as Edie
- Ed Begley Jr as Paul Van Arsdale
- Carol Kane as Treva Van Arsdale
- Brady Bluhm as Jason Van Arsdale
- Rachel Duncan as Bea Van Arsdale
- Lisa Kudrow as Adrian Wexler-Jones
- Phil Hartman as The Salesman
- Nell Carter as The Warden
- Steve Landesberg as Detective Bristol
- Sean Whalen as Carl
- Eric Allan Kramer as Elliot
- Tim Bagley as Mr. White
- Mink Stole as The Nurse
- Rusty Schwimmer as German Nanny
- Mindy Sterling as Nanny With Dog

== Reception ==
The website The Schlock Pit gave the film a mixed review, writing: "will never grace a ‘best kids’ flicks’ list, but there's enough quality on show to render its stay in obscurity unwarranted."

== Home media ==
The film was reissued on DVD by Buena Vista Home Entertainment on February 7, 2006. Scott Weinberg of DVD Talk criticized this release for being "yet another Corman/Dinsey [sic] full-screened and shoddily framed eyesore" and that the audio "sounds like it was recorded via answering machine."
