= Captain Kim =

- Brooklyn Nine-Nine episode
- Episode no.: Season 7 Episode 2
- Directed by: Luke Del Tredici
- Written by: Carol Kolb
- Cinematography by: Rick Page
- Editing by: Emily O'Brien
- Production code: 702
- Original air date: February 6, 2020
- Running time: 21 minutes

Guest appearances
- Nicole Bilderback as Captain Julie Kim; Marcus Folmar as Ronald Palmer; Peter Giles as Nick Slade; John Colella as John Thereford; Elizabeth Liang as Margo Hayes; Shannon McClung as Don Levierel; Angie Patterson as Carol

Episode chronology
← Previous "Manhunter"	Next → "Pimemento"
- Brooklyn Nine-Nine season 7

"Captain Kim" is the 2nd episode of the seventh season of the American television police sitcom series Brooklyn Nine-Nine, and the 132nd overall episode of the series. The episode was written by Carol Kolb and directed by Luke Del Tredici. It aired on February 6, 2020, on NBC, airing back-to-back with the previous episode, "Manhunter".

The show revolves around the fictitious 99th precinct of the New York Police Department in Brooklyn and the officers and detectives that work in the precinct. In this episode, the precinct is introduced to their new captain, Julie Kim. Despite her kind behavior, Jake and Holt are convinced she works with Wuntch and attend a dinner party to prove she works for her. Meanwhile, Boyle uses Rosa's jacket, which gives him more confidence in himself and Terry reunites with a convict he arrested 10 years ago.

According to Nielsen Media Research, the episode was seen by an estimated 1.99 million household viewers and gained a 0.5 ratings share among adults aged 18–49. The episode received very positive reviews from critics, who praised Samberg's and Braugher's acting as well as Nicole Bilderback's guest performance.

== Plot ==
The squad welcomes their new captain, Julie Kim (Nicole Bilderback), who appears to be kind and selfless, finding ways to connect with each member of the squad, such as discussing binders with Amy (Melissa Fumero) or offering Jake (Andy Samberg) a position as an FBI liaison agent. Jake is convinced that this is all an act and sets out to prove that she is actually part of Madeleine Wuntch's vendetta against former-Captain Holt (Andre Braugher).

In order to further get to know her squad, Kim invites them to a dinner party at her house. While she impresses most of the detectives with the number of influential people she knows, Jake and Holt attend only in order to search for evidence to support Jake's theory. Their attempts to get information are constantly thwarted by Amy, who wants to make a good impression on Kim. Meanwhile, Boyle (Joe Lo Truglio) has begun wearing a leather jacket given to him by Rosa (Stephanie Beatriz), which give him confidence. At the party, he flirts with a woman who turns out to be in a relationship, with a man who calls Boyle out. When the man starts crying and feeling hopeless, Boyle gives him the jacket, abandoning his cool persona. One of the catering staff, who are all former convicts getting a second chance in life, reveals that Terry (Terry Crews) is the one who put him in prison, and he's been looking forward to meeting him again. Terry interprets this as a threat.

Jake and Holt discover a locked bedroom on the second floor and that Kim has the only key in her pocket. After Jake pans Holt's attempts to put on a drunken display as a distraction, Holt throws himself down the stairs, which allows Jake to get the key to the room. He finds an e-mail from Wuntch on Kim's computer but he accidentally lets her dog out, a recent rescue whom she'd been keeping safe and quiet away from the party. The dog has an anxiety attack when exposed to the noise and strangers and causes severe damage to Kim's furniture.

Kim has the email read out loud, revealing that Kim had specifically requested the captain's position at the Nine-Nine because she looked up to Holt as a trailblazer for minorities in the NYPD despite Wuntch's unsuccessful attempts to dissuade her. Terry also finds out that the waiter he was suspicious of meant no harm to him. The squad is notified the following day that Kim has obtained a transfer to a different precinct, feeling that the events of the party has ruined any chance of a successful working relationship with the Nine-Nine.

== Reception ==
=== Viewers ===
According to Nielsen Media Research, the episode was seen by an estimated 1.99 million household viewers and gained a 0.5 ratings share among adults aged 18–49. This means that 0.5 percent of all households with televisions watched the episode. This was a 26% decrease over the previous episode, which was watched by 2.66 million viewers and a 0.7 ratings share. With these ratings, Brooklyn Nine-Nine was the highest rated show on NBC for the night, fourth on its timeslot and eighth for the night, behind Last Man Standing, A Million Little Things, The Unicorn, Mom, Station 19, Young Sheldon, and Grey's Anatomy.

=== Critical reviews ===
"Captain Kim" received very positive reviews from critics. LaToya Ferguson of The A.V. Club gave the episode an "A" rating, writing, "'Captain Kim' is a great showcase for both Andre Braugher and Andy Samberg, as well as their back and forth. But unlike the premiere, there's nothing surrounding it (like the manhunt itself) that isn't getting enough attention or weight. Really, it's just a great sign that the first two episodes of this season are as strong as they are at all. Especially seven seasons into a show."

Alan Sepinwall of Rolling Stone wrote, "Any show that lasts into its seventh season will develop certain formulas. While Brooklyn has done better than most at transcending its own clichés, change is not only OK at such an advanced age, it’s almost necessary. Neither “Manhunter” nor “Captain Kim” is a Brooklyn all-timer, but both suggest good things ahead for the year." Nick Harley of Den of Geek gave the episode a 4 star rating out of 5 and wrote, "Season 7 of Brooklyn Nine-Nine starts off strong, utilizing many of the show's strengths while subverting some expectations and taking advantage of Holt's reassignment (for the time being). The series will move to its regularly scheduled, once-a-week slot next week, and we'll see how Holt's story, and Amy's potential pregnancy, develop."
