= Dillman (Brooklyn Nine-Nine) =

- Brooklyn Nine-Nine episode
- Episode no.: Season 7 Episode 9
- Directed by: Kyra Sedgwick
- Written by: Paul Welsh & Madeline Walter
- Cinematography by: Rick Page
- Editing by: Jason Gill
- Production code: 709
- Original air date: March 26, 2020
- Running time: 21 minutes

Guest appearances
- J. K. Simmons as Frank Dillman; Katie Dalmas as Alyssa; Delpaneaux Wills as Officer Howard

Episode chronology
← Previous "The Takeback"	Next → "Admiral Peralta"
- Brooklyn Nine-Nine season 7

"Dillman" is the 9th episode of the seventh season of the American television police sitcom series Brooklyn Nine-Nine, and the 139th overall episode of the series. The episode was written by Paul Welsh and Madeline Walter and directed by recurring cast member Kyra Sedgwick. It aired on March 26, 2020, on NBC.

The show revolves around the fictitious 99th precinct of the New York Police Department in Brooklyn and the officers and detectives that work in the precinct. In this episode, a glitter bomb explodes on Jake's desk and damages crucial evidence on a case. To find out who brought in the bomb, Holt brings in Frank Dillman, one of the best detectives he knows. Jake attempts to find the culprit before Dillman in hopes of convincing Holt to put him on a new task force.

According to Nielsen Media Research, the episode was seen by an estimated 2.14 million household viewers and gained a 0.6 ratings share among adults aged 18–49. The episode received very positive reviews from critics, who praised J.K. Simmons' guest performance, Joe Lo Truglio's acting, Sedgwick's directing and writing.

== Plot ==
Jake (Andy Samberg) asks Holt (Andre Braugher) for a position on his new special task force, citing his records but Holt remains unconvinced. Then, a glitter bomb explodes on Jake's desk, causing damage to the precinct and ruining the only evidence to a murder. Jake panics and accuses a nearby officer of planting it. Holt decides to put the precinct on lockdown until they find the culprit.

To help with the case, Holt calls SFPD Detective Frank Dillman (J. K. Simmons), whom he deems the best detective he's ever worked with. Dillman's strict and fast-learning methods prove to be difficult for Jake to show he can earn the position in the task force so he sets to investigate on his own. He accuses Terry (Terry Crews) after finding his suspenders with glitter but Dillman quickly shoots down the allegation as the glitter is not the same color as the one in the explosion. Dillman then questions Rosa (Stephanie Beatriz) but she proves her innocence because she was watching a soap opera during the events.

Desperate, Jake accuses Holt of being part of the bombing but he reveals he had lunch with Boyle (Joe Lo Truglio) to offer him the task force position. Overhearing Jake and Boyle talk, Dillman then deduces that Jake planted the bomb in order to prove himself to Holt for the task force position. Despite Amy's (Melissa Fumero) defense, Holt suspends Jake. Jake then eventually returns with more evidence: Dillman was fired by the SFPD and now works at a hobby shop and hoped Holt would give him the position at the task force. Dillman confesses to all this but maintains that he didn't plant the bomb. Boyle then arrives and solves the mystery: the culprit was the Assistant District Attorney who wanted evidence destroyed to provide an excuse for losing a weak case at trial and had an officer (who ironically was the first one Jake accused earlier) in the precinct plant the bomb. The officer is arrested and Jake tells Boyle to accept the task force position, citing his performance in solving the case. Dillman realizes Holt doesn't consider him the best detective he has worked with anymore, as Holt lost some respect for him.

== Reception ==
=== Viewers ===
According to Nielsen Media Research, the episode was seen by an estimated 2.14 million household viewers and gained a 0.6 ratings share among adults aged 18–49. This means that 0.6 percent of all households with televisions watched the episode. This was a 8% decrease over the previous episode, which was watched by 2.32 million viewers and a 0.7 ratings share. With these ratings, Brooklyn Nine-Nine was the third highest rated show on NBC for the night behind Law & Order: Special Victims Unit and Superstore, seventh on its timeslot and eleventh for the night, behind Outmatched, A Million Little Things, a Mom rerun, Law & Order: Special Victims Unit, Last Man Standing, two Young Sheldon reruns, Superstore, Station 19, and Grey's Anatomy.

=== Critical reviews ===
"Dillman" received very positive reviews from critics. LaToya Ferguson of The A.V. Club gave the episode a "B" rating, writing, "In addition to being a classic whodunnit, 'Dillman' is a bottle episode with a great guest star and a solid utilization of the entire cast. I'd argue that it's not a showstopping bottle episode like 'The Box' or 'Show Me Going', but it's also not as tension-filled as those episodes. Despite the major implications of the supposed prank-gone-wrong, 'Dillman' pretty much rolls its eyes at the possibility that any member of the squad is actually responsible for the glitter bomb."

Alan Sepinwall of Rolling Stone wrote, "Where 'Trying' was a very different kind of episode than Nine-Nine had tried before, 'Dillman' was just an example of the show playing to all of its strengths at the same time. Expecting something new every week at this stage isn't fair, but it's nice to see some of the old tricks still work when they're executed this well." Nick Harley of Den of Geek gave it a 4.5 star rating out of 5 and wrote, "'Dillman' works both as a great little 'who has done this?' and as a necessary exploration of Jake and Boyle's relationship. As always, I also appreciate Brooklyn Nine-Nine staying focused with just one plot that includes all of the characters. A bottle episode during the time of social distancing? How appropriate."
