= Michael McDonald (comedian) =

American comedian and actor (born 1964)

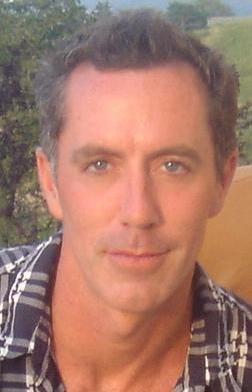
- McDonald in 2010
- Born: Michael James McDonald; December 31, 1964 (age 61); Fullerton, California, U.S.
- Other name: Mike McDonald

Comedy career
- Years active: 1987–present
- Medium: Stand-up, film, television
- Genres: Sketch comedy, improvisational comedy

Michael James McDonald (born December 31, 1964) is an American stand-up comedian, actor, screenwriter, and director. He is best known for starring in the sketch comedy show MADtv from 1998 to 2008, and was the program's longest-tenured cast member, starring in ten seasons.

== Early life ==
McDonald was born in Fullerton, California. When he was nine years old, he was a newspaper delivery boy who delivered the Fullerton News Tribune. He also worked at Naugles in high school. He graduated from St. Juliana Catholic Elementary School in Fullerton, and later went to Servite High School in Anaheim, California, and graduated from the University of Southern California with a business degree. At one point, he taught swim lessons at Loara High School for Anaheim Parks and Recreation where he rose to assistant manager and worked with Gwen Stefani.

After college, a friend took McDonald to see an improv comedy show at The Groundlings Theater. McDonald quit his job at the bank and enrolled in The Groundlings improv program. He was a member of the troupe from 1992 to 1997. During that time, he was also involved in writing and directing films for Roger Corman.

== Career ==
=== Early career ===
McDonald made his television debut on Family Matters. He would guest star in such shows as Seinfeld (in two episodes playing two different parts), Just Shoot Me!, Scrubs and NewsRadio. He also made brief cameos in all three Austin Powers films. McDonald had a starring role with Will Forte and Nicole Sullivan on the short-lived MTV show Clone High as the voice of Gandhi. McDonald appeared as the lead Carly's assistant in the 1996 sitcom, first appearing in season one episode four, Something About a Family Photo.

=== MADtv ===
McDonald joined the cast of MADtv in 1998, eventually becoming the longest-standing cast member in the show's history (ten seasons). He performed several recurring characters, including Stuart Larkin, Rusty Miller, Marvin Tikvah, Sean Gidcomb, Bible Dude, the Depressed Persian Tow Truck Man, Fightin' Ron, and F. Michael McKrofsky of "Real M*********ing Talk". After ten years on MADtv McDonald left the cast, but he was a contributing writer and director for the show's final season.

=== Directing career ===
In addition to directing numerous episodes of various TV series, McDonald also directed the 1994 film The Crazysitter and the 1995 film A Bucket of Blood. McDonald directed 12 episodes of Brooklyn Nine-Nine. He also directed the failed 2019 ABC pilot Unrelated.

McDonald was also a writer, director, and producer of the ABC TV series Cougar Town.

=== Stand-up comedy ===
McDonald has toured at stand-up comedy clubs across the country. His stand-up comedy special Michael McDonald: Model Citizen premiered on Showtime on October 9, 2010.

== Personal life ==
McDonald lived in Hollywood Hills, California until 2024.

== Filmography ==
=== Film ===
Year	Title	Role	Notes
1991	Uncaged	Clean Cut John	
1992	In the Heat of Passion	Nick	
1992	Dance with Death	Henry	
1992	Body Waves	Squirrely	
1992	Final Judgement	Rainy	Video
1992	Bloodfist IV: Die Trying	Newscaster	Video
1993	Full Contact		
1994	Bloodfist V: Human Target	Jewelry Store Manager	Video
1994	Revenge of the Red Baron	Psychiatrist	Writer
1994	The Unborn II	Welfare Worker #1	
1994	Leprechaun 2	Waiter	
1994	No Dessert, Dad, Till You Mow the Lawn	Evil Hypnotist	
1994	In the Heat of Passion II: Unfaithful	Bartender	
1994	The Crazysitter	Mr. Smith	Director; directorial debut
1995	Carnosaur 2	Evac. Team Pilot	
1995	Bloodfist VI: Ground Zero	Corey	Video
1995	Hideaway	Young cop	
1995	Criminal Hearts	Tierney	
1995	Twisted Love	Stoned kid	
1995	Bloodfist VII: Manhunt	Running Officer	Video
1995	A Bucket of Blood	Dancer	Director
1996	Baby Face Nelson	Reporter	
1996	Carnosaur 3: Primal Species	Police Officer Wilson	
1997	Austin Powers: International Man of Mystery	Steve Harmon the Evil Henchman	
1997	Casper: A Spirited Beginning	Sarcastic Protester	Video
1998	Casper Meets Wendy	Spike-Stretch	Video
1998	Richie Rich's Christmas Wish	Montgomery	Video
1999	Austin Powers: The Spy Who Shagged Me	NATO Soldier	
2000	Chump Change	Dack	
2002	Slackers	Economics Professor	
2002	Austin Powers in Goldmember	Royal Guard	
2003	Dickie Roberts: Former Child Star	Maitre d'	
2004	Outing Riley	Andy	
2006	Moonpie	Mitch Henderson	
2013	The Heat	Julian	
2014	Minutes	John Feldman	Short
2015	Spy	Patrick	
2016	The Boss	Bryce Crean	
2016	Ghostbusters	Jonathan	
2018	The Happytime Murders	Ronovan Scargle	
2018	The Loud House: Clyde and His Dads	Howard McBride	Voice, short
2021	Halloween Kills	Little John	
2024	Mother of the Bride	Clay	

=== Television ===
Television appearances by Lyric Bent
Year	Title	Role	Notes
1987	Nightlife	Himself	Episode: "Episode #1.144"
1987	Stand Up America	Himself	
1992	An Evening at the Improv	Himself	Episode: "Episode #9.9"
1992	Revenge of the Nerds III: The Next Generation	Disc Jockey	Television film
1993	Family Matters	Manager	Episode: "Buds 'n' Buns"
1993	The John Larroquette Show	Phil	Episode: "The Past Comes Back"
1994	Revenge of the Nerds IV: Nerds in Love	Party Guest	Television film
1995	Sherman Oaks	Jules	Episode: "Golf, Dating, and the Devil"
1995	Sawbones	Prostitute	Television film
1995	Virtual Seduction	Disoriented Man	Television film
1995	A Bucket of Blood	Dancer	Television film
1995–1996	Seinfeld	Player #2/Jesse	Episode: "The Understudy" & "The Wig Master"
1995–1997	Night Stand with Dick Dietrick	Ray; Chuckie MacDougal	3 episodes
1997	Ellen	The Guy	Episode: "Alone Again ... Naturally"
1997	NewsRadio	Lee	Episode: "Airport"
1998	Instant Comedy with the Groundlings	Himself	Episode: "Episode #1.1 & #1.2"
1998	Just Shoot Me	Reg	Episode: "The Emperor"
1998	The Drew Carey Show	The Parking Attendant	Episode: "From the Earth to the Moon"
1998	National Lampoon's Men in White	Secret Service Agent	Television film
1998–2008	MADtv	Himself/Cast Member	Main cast: seasons 4–13, guest: season 14
1999	Banned in America: The World's Sexiest Commercials	Host	TV special
2001	Passions	The Face in the Pool	Episode: "Episode #1.516-#1.518"
2001–2003	Invader Zim	RoboDad	Voice, recurring role
2001–2009	Scrubs	Mike Davis	Recurring cast: season 1; guest: seasons 2 and 6–8
2002	Greg the Bunny	Leo	Episode: "The Singing Mailman"
2002–2003	Clone High	Gandhi	Voice, main role
2005	Fat Actress	Sam Rascal	Recurring role
2005–2006	7th Heaven	Edward Jameson	Recurring cast: season 10
2005–2009	Kathy Griffin: My Life on the D-List	Himself	Recurring cast: seasons 1–5
2006	Talkshow with Spike Feresten	Himself	Episode: "Michael McDonald"
2006	Desperate Housewives	Steven	Episode: "Silly People"
2006	Lovespring International	Drake	Episode: "The Demuler"
2008	My Boys	Paul	Episode: "Spit Take"
2008	Hannah Montana	Chef Duncan Keats	Episode: "Don't Go Breakin' My Tooth"
2009	Pushing Daisies	Galveston Gus	Episode: "Kerplunk"
2009	Kath & Kim	Neil	Episode: "Home"
2009	Head Case	Stanley	Episode: "Twinkle, Twinkle ..."
2009	Reaper	Mr. Elliott Sprong	Episode: "To Sprong, with Love"
2009	Rita Rocks	Rob Boone	Recurring cast: season 2
2011	Cougar Town	Wayne Gibbons	2 episodes
2012–2013	Web Therapy	Ben Tomlund	Recurring cast: seasons 2–3
2013	House of Lies	Carl Criswell	Recurring cast: season 2
2013	Save Me	Randall	Episode: "Heavenly Hostess"
2014	Community	Ronald Mohammad	Episode: "Basic Story"
2015	Newsreaders	James Jordan	Episode: "A Billionaire Goes to Hell; Sitcom Family"
2016–present	The Loud House	Howard McBride	Voice, recurring role
2017	Superior Donuts	Manfred	Episode: "Painted Love"
2017	Rhett & Link's Buddy System	Enrique	Episode: "Spa Trip"
2017–2018	Nobodies	Blaine Kaine	Recurring cast
2019	Crazy Ex-Girlfriend	Open Mic MC	Episode: "I'm in Love"
2020	Brooklyn Nine-Nine	Adam Jarver	Episode: "Ding Dong"
2022	God's Favorite Idiot	Leviathan	Episode: "God, Satan and All the Good Smells"
2022	What We Do in the Shadows	Gustave Leroy	Episode: "Freddie"
2023	How I Met Your Father	Warren	Episode: "The Reset Button"
2024	Good Times: Black Again	Elon Musk	
2024	It's Florida, Man	John Walsh	Episode: "Speedy" (Season 2, Episode 1)
2026	Life, Larry and the Pursuit of Unhappiness	Bob “The Neighbor”	Episode: “Lincoln” (Season 1, Episode 5)

=== Stand-up specials ===
Year	Title	Role	Notes
2010	Michael McDonald: Model Citizen	Himself	TV special
