= Brendan Broderick =

American author and screenwriter

Brendan Broderick is an American author and screenwriter. A graduate of the Tisch School of the Arts at New York University, his screenwriting credits include numerous B-movies and action films, many made with producer Roger Corman. Titles include Route 9 (1998); Fear of Flying (1999); Spacejacked (1997); House of the Damned; Bloodfist VII: Manhunt (1995), and Bloodfist VI: Ground Zero (1995); A Bucket of Blood and Stranglehold (1994).

His first novel, Play It Straight, was published by Epigram Press in 2012.

In 2023, Broderick wrote and directed the short film RAILROADNYC. The film was an official selection at several festivals, including YoFiFest, Bowery Film Festival and the East Village Film Festival.
