= Macedo (musical group) =

American indie pop duo

- This photo was taken at a live BMI Showcase.

Background information
- Genre: Indie pop
- Years active: 2010–present
- Label: MoonGold Records
- Members: Michelle Macedo; Melissa Macedo
- Website: macedomusic.com

Macedo is an American indie music duo consisting of identical-twin sisters and actors Michelle and Melissa Macedo.

== Early life ==
Twin sisters Michelle and Melissa were born in Pasadena, California. Growing up in a musical family, the sisters began playing piano at age three, and Michelle began playing classical guitar at age 11. Michelle began writing at an early age and became the duo's primary songwriter, while Melissa is responsible for the vocal harmonies and instrumentation. The twins' musical influences included Zero 7, Feist, Ella Fitzgerald, Joni Mitchell and Billie Holiday. They attended an all-girl Catholic high school in Pasadena, where Michelle wrote most of the songs for her solo album La Luna.

== Musical career ==
=== La Luna ===
During her first year of college Michelle recorded and produced her debut solo album, La Luna, for OutTake Records in Boston. She recorded the album in ten hours, performing all the instruments. The sisters separated for the first time when they attended different colleges. Melissa attended Columbia University (Barnard College) in New York City, where she received dual BA degrees in Gender Studies and Theatre. Michelle attended Emerson College in Boston, receiving a BFA in acting.

=== Flags & Boxes ===
While they were apart, Michelle wrote their first album, Flags & Boxes, recorded primarily in Boston with producer Kush Mody alongside engineers Nils Montan and Andrew Oedel at Emerson College radio station WERS. The album was mixed by Justin Gerrish (Vampire Weekend, RaRa Riot). Their music is noted for its vocal harmonies and instrumental range of instruments, including organ and French horn. and the album was reviewed in Vogue India.

=== Paper Doll ===
Michelle and Melissa Macedo released their EP "Paper Doll" on February 4, 2014. A single from the EP, "Your Skin", was premiered by WNYC's Soundcheck. Soundcheck praised the single, saying "'Your Skin' proves to be an equally catchy and emotional break-up kiss-off anthem". "Paper Doll" was co-produced by Khris Kellow (Christina Aguilera, Patti LaBelle).

Another single from the EP, "Like Me Most", was premiered by LadyGunn Magazine. LadyGunn, describing their music said: "While they look great on screen, it's their music that shines through the most. They have been compared to Fiona Apple meets Regina Spektor and at times have R+B influences and hooks that make you sing them out loud, full volume like you are saying all the things you never could to an ex."

The third single, "17", was premiered by Paste Magazine. Paste says the twins are known to be completely opposite in personalities; "The sisters may look alike, but that’s where the similarities end: each brought her own personality to their work, the result is a lesson in duality and teamwork (and a damn nice sounding one, at that)."

==== Ghost Town ====
Michelle and Melissa Macedo released their single "Ghost Town" in April 2017. The following single "Supernatural" was released with a music video via PulseSpikes.

The album Ghost Town received positive critical reception from music publications. Surreal Music Magazine praised the conceptual nature of the album, describing it as following "a darker theme that addresses depression, loneliness, and the feeling of heartbreak" and noting that "the songwriting pair put raw emotions into their lyrical pieces to create songs that listeners can relate to and find comfort in." The publication emphasized that Macedo creates "more than just songs to fill silence, each one tells a story" and highlighted the thoughtful construction of the album, noting that "the flow of the album is very important" and praising the variation that allows "the listener to really follow the story of each song since it is a conceptual album."

Music Notes Global praised the album's social impact, stating: "More than just another album release Macedo used the release of their 'Ghost Town' album to address issues that still haunt us in our daily lives. In the standout statement song 'Take Back the Night' the singing twins speak to the #MeToo movement addressing sexual assault and women empowerment."

==== Pasadena Records and "Paradise" EP ====
In 2020, the band signed with Pasadena Records and released the single "Stronger Now," which climbed to No. 42 on the Top 100 Pop Charts and received national radio play on stations including SiriusXM's 'The Pulse'.

The twins released their EP Paradise in 2021 through Pasadena Records, with the goal of creating something positive during the pandemic. The EP featured a more uplifting sound compared to their previous darker material. The lead single "Can't Imagine (Without You)" was written with producer Chris Chu of The Morning Bends and focused on themes of sisterhood and friendship.The rest of the tracks were written and produced with producing duo darkDark.

==== Recent singles and collaborations ====
The band's singles "Can't Imagine" and "Stronger Now" both garnered national radio play. Their more recent releases include "Block of Ice," which propelled them into international acclaim and radioplay.

"Block of Ice" and "Optimistic" were produced by Jules Duke (The Mystic Braves) and represent an evolutionary pair in the band's discography. "Optimistic" takes a modern spin on 1980s synth-pop and has been described as having "instant earworm status." The song also received a remix by Dresage.

== Acting career ==
=== Film ===
The twins' breakthrough role came in Every Time I Die (2019), a supernatural thriller directed by Robi Michael that had its world premiere at the Cinequest Film & Creativity Festival. The film also starred Marc Menchaca (Ozark), Drew Fonteiro (The Last Ship), and Tyler Dash White.

In 2022, both sisters appeared in Aristotle and Dante Discover the Secrets of the Universe, a coming-of-age romantic drama based on the novel by Benjamin Alire Sáenz. The film premiered at the 47th Toronto International Film Festival. The film served as the opening night film for Outfest Los Angeles 2023. The film was produced by Lin-Manuel Miranda, who had previously narrated the audiobook version of the novel.

The twins also appeared in Blood Heist (2018), which had its world premiere at the Fantasia International Film Festival. The film starred James Franco, Carlito Olivera, Edy Ganem, and Shakira Barrera. The sisters are set to appear in the upcoming sci-fi thriller Night After Night, directed by Josh Lobo. The film stars Johnny Sibilly (Hacks).

In 2025, the twins starred in the horror-comedy Thinestra, directed by Nathan Hertz in his feature directorial debut. Michelle Macedo plays Penny, while Melissa Macedo portrays her malevolent doppelganger Penelope. The film had its world premiere at the 33rd Raindance Film Festival in London. Thinestra won the Vortex Sci-Fi, Fantasy & Horror Award (Feature) Grand Prize at the Rhode Island International Film Festival and is set to have its European premiere at the 58th Sitges International Fantastic Film Festival of Catalonia in October 2025. Written by Avra Fox-Lerner, the film also features Brian Huskey, Shannon Dang, Gavin Stenhouse, and comedian Mary Beth Barone.

=== Television ===
The sisters recurred in the Netflix series "Girlboss" as a twin band called "Animated Discussion". Michelle also appeared in Season 2 of "Goliath" on Amazon Prime. Michelle appeared as Sierra in the season finale of ABC's crime drama "High Potential".

=== Theater ===
Michelle and Melissa co-founded a theater company called, World Kin Ensemble, which has been producing shows aimed to combat sexual assault on college campuses. Around that time they toured act in the touring show, Dirty Talk.

== Discography ==
=== Solo (Michelle Macedo) ===
- La Luna (2007)

=== Macedo (duo) ===
==== Studio albums ====
- Flags & Boxes (2011)
- Ghost Town (2017)

==== Extended plays ====
- Paper Doll (2014)
- Paradise (2021)

==== Singles ====
- "Caught" (2011)
- "Your Skin" (2014)
- "Like Me Most" (2014)
- "17" (2014)
- "Ghost Town" (2017)
- "Supernatural" (2017)
- "Stronger Now" (2020)
- "Can't Imagine (Without You)" (2021)
- "Block of Ice"
- "Optimistic"

==== Cover versions ====
- "Sunroof" (originally by Courtship) – produced by Jeremy Ruzumna
