= Manhunter (Brooklyn Nine-Nine) =

- Brooklyn Nine-Nine episode
- Episode no.: Season 7 Episode 1
- Directed by: Cortney Carrillo
- Written by: David Phillips
- Cinematography by: Rick Page
- Editing by: Jason Gill
- Production code: 701
- Original air date: February 6, 2020
- Running time: 21 minutes

Guest appearances
- Vanessa Bayer as Officer Debbie Fogle; Scott Vance as Chris Renaux; Merrick McCartha as Frank Murwin

Episode chronology
← Previous "Suicide Squad"	Next → "Captain Kim"
- Brooklyn Nine-Nine season 7

"Manhunter" is the season premiere of the seventh season of the American television police sitcom series Brooklyn Nine-Nine, and the 131st overall episode of the series. The episode was written by David Phillips and directed by Cortney Carrillo. It aired on February 6, 2020 on NBC, airing back-to-back with the follow-up episode, "Captain Kim".

The show revolves around the fictitious 99th precinct of the New York Police Department in Brooklyn and the officers and detectives that work in the precinct. In this episode, the precinct must investigate the manhunt for a shooter who participated in an assassination attempt. The manhunt reunites Jake with recently-demoted Holt, but the partnership soon turns into a competition to solve the case. Meanwhile, Amy begins to suspect she might be pregnant.

According to Nielsen Media Research, the episode was seen by an estimated 2.66 million household viewers and gained a 0.7 ratings share among adults aged 18–49. The episode received positive reviews from critics, who praised the cast and the writing.

== Plot ==
Councilman Bosworth is shot while giving a conference and the precinct is assigned to conduct the manhunt for the shooter. Cooperating with Jake (Andy Samberg) in his position as the lead of the investigation is former Captain-demoted-to-patrolman Holt (Andre Braugher), whose enthusiasm for duty leads him to break with proper procedure, which annoys his fellow patrol officer, Debbie Fogle (Vanessa Bayer).

The investigation causes friction between Jake and Holt when Holt starts taking the lead on the case, even acting as the police spokesperson on TV. Jake then gives Holt a fake lead to get him out of the way so Jake can pursue the true lead himself. Jake and Boyle (Joe Lo Truglio) manage to find the shooter and arrest him. Holt, who had seen through Jake's ruse, deduces that Jake arrested the wrong suspect and that an eyewitness who had given them a statement is the real shooter. Angered at being upstaged again, Jake takes Holt off the case but he convinces Debbie to pursue the suspect anyway; they track him down but he gets the drop on them and takes them hostage. Jake and Boyle discover they can track Holt and Debbie through one of the apps on her phone.

Meanwhile, during the operation, Amy (Melissa Fumero) confides in Rosa (Stephanie Beatriz) that despite planning to wait a year, she may be pregnant. Terry (Terry Crews), sees them talking and gets upset because he thinks everyone is badmouthing him behind his back. Rosa suggests that Amy take a pregnancy test, and she drinks water non-stop in an attempt to force herself to urinate. No sooner does she finally get the urge then Jake and Boyle call for the squad to rescue Holt and Debbie. Amy, desperate now to urinate, physically subdues the suspect to bring the standoff to a close.

Both Jake and Holt apologize to each other, showing their mutual respect. Amy's pregnancy test is negative, and her and Jake's disappointment makes them decide to start trying to have children right away.

== Reception ==
=== Viewers ===
According to Nielsen Media Research, the episode was seen by an estimated 2.66 million household viewers and gained a 0.7 ratings share among adults aged 18–49. This means that 0.7 percent of all households with televisions watched the episode. This was a 71% increase over the previous episode, which was watched by 1.55 million viewers and a 0.5/2 ratings share. With these ratings, Brooklyn Nine-Nine was the highest rated show on NBC for the night, fourth on its timeslot and eighth for the night, behind Last Man Standing, A Million Little Things, The Unicorn, Mom, Station 19, Young Sheldon, and Grey's Anatomy.

=== Critical reviews ===
"Manhunter" received positive reviews from critics. LaToya Ferguson of The A.V. Club gave the episode an "A−" rating, writing, "Luckily, the episode is truly strong enough on the comedy and character fronts to make the lack of investment in the case worth it. Amy's possible pregnancy is more interesting than the manhunt, as is the new dynamic at play with Jake and Holt this season."

Alan Sepinwall of Rolling Stone wrote, "Any show that lasts into its seventh season will develop certain formulas. While Brooklyn has done better than most at transcending its own clichés, change is not only OK at such an advanced age, it’s almost necessary. Neither “Manhunter” nor “Captain Kim” is a Brooklyn all-timer, but both suggest good things ahead for the year." Nick Harley of Den of Geek gave the episode a 4 star rating out of 5 and wrote, "Season 7 of Brooklyn Nine-Nine starts off strong, utilizing many of the show's strengths while subverting some expectations and taking advantage of Holt's reassignment (for the time being). The series will move to its regularly scheduled, once-a-week slot next week, and we'll see how Holt's story, and Amy's potential pregnancy, develop."
