= Ellie Reed =

American actress

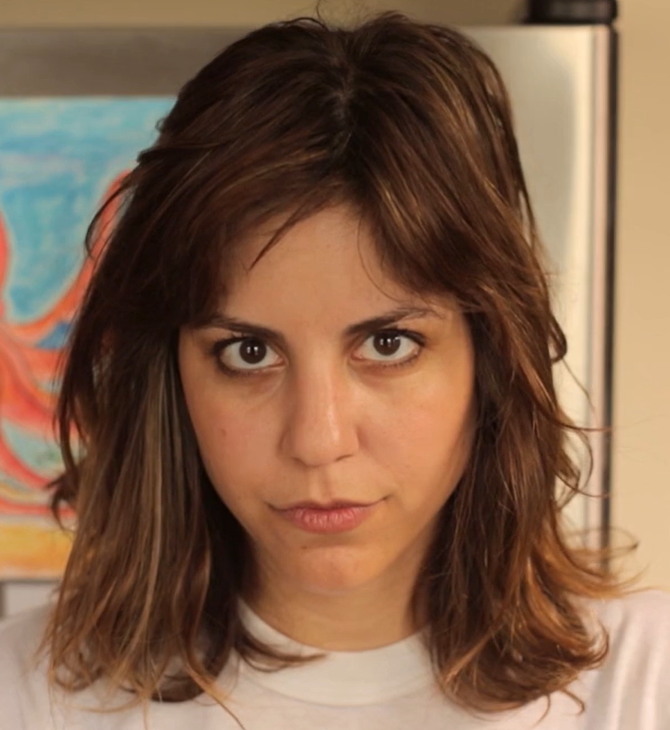
- Ellie Reed in "3 Nights" in 2014
- Born: Deerfield, Illinois, U.S.
- Education: Northwestern University (BA)
- Occupation: Actor
- Writing career
- Years active: 2010–present

Ellie Reed is an American actress who has worked primarily in theatre and television. She is known for playing the best friend of the main character in the Netflix series Girlboss.

== Early life ==
Reed was born in Deerfield, Illinois. She graduated from Northwestern University, and further studied improv programs at The Second City Conservatory and iO Theater in Chicago, Illinois.

== Theatre career ==
Reed joined the Griffin Theatre (Chicago) in 2011 and starred in the productions "No More Dead Dogs," "Letters Home," and "Men Should Weep." She was also involved in the founding of and was casting director of the Buzz22 theatre company in Chicago, where she starred in "Hooters: A Play" and "Quake," as well as "She Kills Monsters" which was part of Steppenwolf Theatre Garage Rep's 2013 production.

Her play The Beecher Sisters had its premiere at Chicago’s Awkward Pause Theatre in 2015.

== Film and television career ==
Reed made her debut screen appearance in the short film Positive Comment in 2010 and went on to appear in three episodes of Touch 'n Dix in 2012. Since then she has appeared in such TV series as Betrayal, Chicago P.D., Empire, Future You, and 2 Broke Girls.

Reed landed a main supporting role as Annie, the best friend of Sophia played by Britt Robertson in Girlboss for 13 episodes in 2017. In 2018, Reed played Sarah Green in the pilot episode of the 2018 ABC reboot of The Greatest American Hero.

In 2019, Reed played the leading role in the film Big House, which was due to have its world premiere at the RiverRun International Film Festival in April 2020.

In 2020 she had a brief cameo in the Brooklyn Nine-Nine episode as Kayla in the episode Lights Out, and starred as Camilla’s girlfriend in CBS/Disney+ series Diary of a Future President.

== Filmography ==
=== Film ===
Year	Title	Role	Notes
2010	Positive Comment	Additional sisters	Short film
2014	3 Nights	Ella	Short film
2016	The Meaning of Christmas (Cookies)		Short film
2017	Ten More	Laurie	Short film
2018	The Greatest American Hero	Sarah Green	ABC pilot
2019	Big House	Claire	Lead role
2021	The Workplace	Kennedy	Short film

=== Television ===
Year	Title	Role	Notes
2012	Touch 'n Dix	Ellie	for 3 episodes
2013	Betrayal	Holly	Episode - That Is Not What Ships Are Built For
2014	Chicago P.D.	Josie Valescu	An Honest Woman
2015	Empire	Fashion VP	Episode - Our Dancing Days
2016	Future You (TV series)	Marney	Episode - Internet Casualties
2016	2 Broke Girls	Claire	Episode - And the Story Telling Show
2017	Girlboss	Annie	main role - 13 episodes
2018	The Big Bang Theory	Jenna	Episode - The Sibling Realignment
2018	The Greatest American Hero	Sarah Green	ABC pilot
2019	I Think You Should Leave with Tim Robinson	Lauren	Episode - Has This Ever Happened to You?
2019	Mom	Mackenzie	Episode - Soup Town and a Little Blonde Mongoose
2020	Brooklyn Nine-Nine	Kayla	Episode - Lights Out
2020-present	Diary of a Future President	Danielle	TV series (3 episodes)

=== Theatre productions ===
Production	Theatre company
No More Dead Dogs	Griffin theatre
Letters Home	Griffin theatre
Men Should Weep	Griffin theatre
Hooters: A Play	Buzz22 Chicago
Quake	Buzz22 Chicago
She Kills Monsters	Steppenwolf Theatre Garage Rep
Naked Mole Rat Gets Dressed	Lifeline Theatre
The Casuals	Jackalope Theatre
House Ensembles Twisty & Moxie	The Second City
Night of the Magician	Screen Door
Sam: A Fairy Tale	Screen Door

== Awards and nominations ==
Year	Award	Category	Nominated work	Result	Ref.
2020	North Hollywood Cinefest	Best Picture (Shared)	Big House	Won	
2020	Rhode Island International Film Festival	Best Feature Film (Shared)	Big House	Won	
