= Suicide Squad (Brooklyn Nine-Nine) =

- Brooklyn Nine-Nine episode
- Episode no.: Season 6 Episode 18
- Directed by: Dan Goor
- Written by: Dan Goor & Luke Del Tredici
- Cinematography by: Ryan Page
- Editing by: Ryan Neatha Johnson
- Production code: 618
- Original air date: May 16, 2019
- Running time: 21 minutes

Guest appearances
- Kyra Sedgwick as Chief Wuntch; Ken Marino as Captain Jason "C.J." Stentley; Phil Reeves as Commissioner John Kelly; Dean Winters as Keith "The Vulture" Pembroke; Chasty Ballesteros as Ana; Doug Hurley as Gerard; Torrance Jordan as ESU Cop; Jude B. Lanston as Archie; Nancy Lantis as Kimble

Episode chronology
← Previous "Sicko"	Next → "Manhunter"
- Brooklyn Nine-Nine season 6

"Suicide Squad" is the eighteenth episode and season finale of the sixth season of the American television police sitcom series Brooklyn Nine-Nine, and the 130th overall episode of the series. The episode was written by series co-creator Dan Goor and Luke Del Tredici and directed by Goor. It aired on May 16, 2019 on NBC, airing back-to-back with the previous episode, "Sicko".

The show revolves around the fictitious 99th precinct of the New York Police Department in Brooklyn and the officers and detectives that work in the precinct. In this episode, Jake assembles a team between the precinct and past enemies in order to take down Kelly's Stingray operation.

According to Nielsen Media Research, the episode was seen by an estimated 1.55 million household viewers and gained a 0.5/2 ratings share among adults aged 18–49. The episode received positive reviews from critics, who praised the writing, cast performances, twists and the ending.

== Plot ==
To help defeat Kelly's (Phil Reeves) app, Jake (Andy Samberg) has brought Chief Wuntch (Kyra Sedgwick), Captain Jason "C.J." Stentley (Ken Marino) and Keith "The Vulture" Pembroke (Dean Winters) for help. Together with Holt (Andre Braugher), Amy (Melissa Fumero), Boyle (Joe Lo Truglio), Terry (Terry Crews) and Rosa (Stephanie Beatriz), they hide in one of the Vulture's apartments to serve as the operation center.

Jake's plan involves committing a fake crime, which will force Kelly to deploy his Stingray phone tracker. The crime will involve the fake kidnapping of C.J., as his high ranking will be enough to impact the police. In order to stall the investigation, the Vulture will be the lead investigator of the case and Wuntch will plant a bug on Kelly's uniform, which will expose his operation. However, the plan goes awry when C.J. resists the kidnapping, inadvertently exposing Jake's face, the Vulture hands Jake's hair to forensics, and Wuntch doesn't plant the bug when she sees that Holt sent Terry and Rosa to spy on her.

Holt and Wuntch then infiltrate a police's party to plant the bug. However, Holt realizes that Wuntch betrayed them and is working with Kelly. An NYPD team then arrests the squad after the Vulture also betrays them, having been promised the position of Captain in the 69th precinct. However, this turns out to be part of the plan, as Wuntch clones Kelly's phone to access all his confidential information, exposing his operation. Holt was unaware of this plan, as he would have otherwise not cooperated. Kelly is fired and Wuntch is temporarily promoted to Commissioner. The squad go to the bar to Terry's farewell party when Holt interrupts the party, saying that Wuntch made some changes in the precinct, which will allow Terry to stay. But Holt is demoted to traffic duty officer due to a conversation he had with Wuntch that he only spent a month as a patrolman before becoming a detective, which is in breach of NYPD rules.

== Reception ==
=== Viewers ===
According to Nielsen Media Research, the episode was seen by an estimated 1.55 million household viewers and gained a 0.5/2 ratings share among adults aged 18–49. This means that 0.5 percent of all households with televisions watched the episode, while 2 percent of all households watching television at that time watched it. This was a slight decrease over the previous episode, which was watched by 1.63 million viewers and a 0.5/3 ratings share. With these ratings, Brooklyn Nine-Nine was the fourth highest rated show on NBC for the night behind two Superstore episodes and Law & Order: Special Victims Unit, fourth on its timeslot and tenth for the night, behind two Superstore episodes, Law & Order: Special Victims Unit, Station 19, S.W.A.T., Grey's Anatomy, Unraveling the Mystery: A Big Bang Farewell, Young Sheldon, and The Big Bang Theory.

With DVR factored in, the episode was watched by 2.46 million viewers.

=== Critical reviews ===
"Suicide Squad" received positive reviews from critics. LaToya Ferguson of The A.V. Club gave the episode an "A−" rating, writing, "Brooklyn Nine-Nine's sixth season is an interesting case. I'm not sure that this is my favorite season overall, but objectively, it took a gamble and did some really interesting and funny things. It also opened itself up to a new audience while providing a love letter to the established one with a closing episode like 'Suicide Squad.' Plus, 'Suicide Squad' is very funny and that's really what fuels it, not just the Nine-Nine vs. the world component."

Alan Sepinwall of Rolling Stone wrote, "This turned out to be one of Brooklyn's best seasons, and this was one of the series’ stronger finales." Nick Harley of Den of Geek gave the episode a 4 star rating out of 5 and wrote, "As I said, this was a fun episode and an incredibly solid season of Brooklyn Nine-Nine in general. The season took plenty of risks, tackling important social issues, experimenting with its format, and even infusing new camera angles and expletives while still rewarding fans that have stuck with this show since the beginning. I think it's one of the best seasons of the show, and I look forward to more. NINE-NIIIINE!!!!"
