= Bloodfist VI: Ground Zero =

- Official DVD cover
- Directed by: Rick Jacobson
- Written by: Brendan Brodick; Rob Kerchner
- Starring: Don Wilson; Marcus Aurelius; Michael Blanks; Anthony Boyer; Cat Sassoon
- Music by: John R. Graham; J. Eric Schmidt
- Production company: Hollywood Road Films
- Distributed by: New Concorde
- Release date: January 31, 1995
- Running time: 86 minutes
- Country: United States
- Language: English

Bloodfist VI: Ground Zero is a 1995 American action film directed by Rick Jacobson and starring Don Wilson, Marcus Aurelius, Michael Blanks, and Anthony Boyer. It was written by Brendan Broderick and Rob Kerchner. A sequel to Bloodfist V: Human Target (1994), it is the sixth installment in the Bloodfist film series.

== Premise ==
Air Force courier Nick Corrigan is dispatched to a remote nuclear missile base in the Midwest. Unbeknownst to him, a group of terrorists has seized control of the base with the intention of launching missiles at major cities across the nation. They imprison Nick within the base to prevent him from thwarting their scheme. However, what the terrorists fail to realize is that Sgt. Corrigan is a seasoned ex-Special Forces operative, fully equipped to neutralize them and their plans, even under the most challenging circumstances.

== Cast ==
- Don "The Dragon" Wilson as Nick Corrigan
- Marcus Aurelius as Sabian
- Michael Blanks as Ahmad
- Anthony Boyer as Miller
- Art Camacho as Rivera
- Ed Crick as Davis
- Robin Curtis as Major Marin
- Vincent DePalma as Captain Hicks
- Alex Desir as Hassad
- Jon Freedman as Forbes
- Jonathan Fuller as Fawkes
- Steve Garvey as Major Tillman
- Randall Shiro Ideishi as Gates
- Wynn Irwin as General Carmichael
- Howard Jackson as Becker
- Dennis Keiffer as Kurtz
- Kevin Knotts as Lucas
- Michael McDonald as Corey (credited as Michael James McDonald)
- Carl A. McGee as Ali
- Catya Sassoon as Tori (credited as Cat Sassoon)
- Matthew Shoehan as Watkins
- Raymond Storti as Perez
- Leonard O. Turner as Colonel Briggs

== Criticism ==
Jack Shaheen lists Bloodfist VI: Ground Zero as one of the most Anti-Arabist films produced by the United States film industry.
