= Suicidal Tour =

1943 football club tour in Brazil

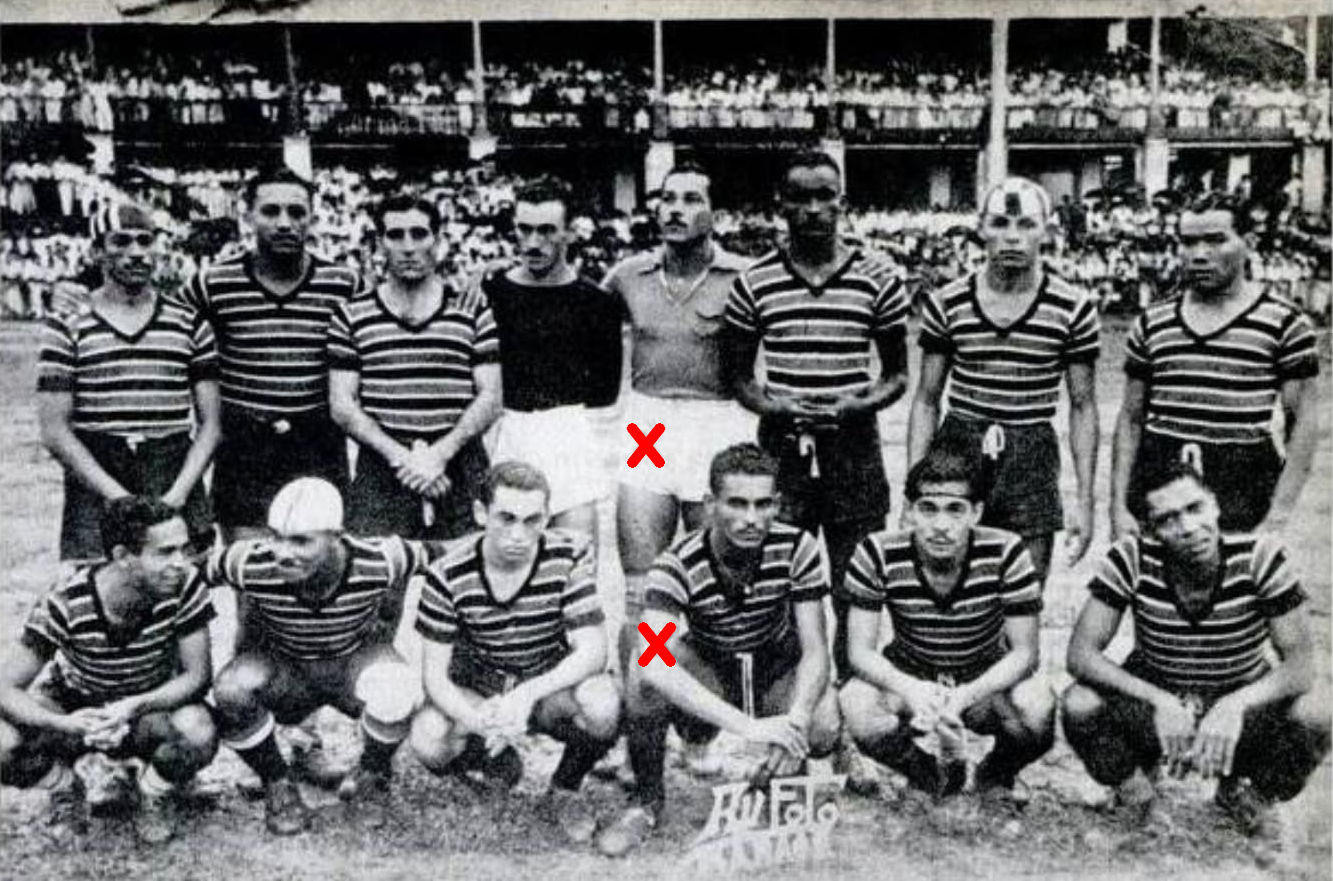
The 1943 Santa Cruz squad. Players marked with a red cross died during the tour.

The Suicidal Tour (Brazilian Portuguese: Excursão Suicida), also known as the Death Tour (Excursão da Morte), took place when Brazilian professional football club Santa Cruz Futebol Clube played a series of at least 26 (Note: Some sources state they played 28 matches.) friendly matches in six different cities across the North Region of Brazil from 2 January 1943 to 29 April 1943, seeking to raise funds. The tour gained its name due to the misfortunes endured by the club, including financial difficulties, the threat of German submarine attacks, and deaths.

The tour began when, looking to recover from a financial crisis, Recife-based Santa Cruz arranged five matches in Belém, Pará. After that, the team was invited to extend their tour to Amazonas. Traveling up the Amazon River for two weeks, Santa Cruz first started experiencing problems in Manaus, where seven members of the team's delegation caught dysentery. Although most of them recovered, two players contracted typhoid fever and died. Two other players left the club to play for Manaus clubs.

Unable to return home by sea due to World War II and needing to cover growing costs, Santa Cruz had to return to Recife by land, playing matches along the way to earn more money. The journey back to Recife had further problems, including a fake arrest warrant for a player, a trip alongside thieves, and two train derailments.

== Background ==
1943 Santa Cruz roster (Note: Players are listed by their first name or nickname, as per Brazilian football tradition. For further information, see Mononym § Other examples.)
Goalkeepers	Defenders	Midfielders	Forwards
King; Eutímio	Cidinho II; Pedrinho; Zé Maria	Omar; Pelado; Capuco; Amaro; Guaberinha	Edésio; Limoeirinho; Cidinho I (Note: Sometimes spelled as "Sidinho I", "Cidinho" and "Sidinho".); Pinhegas; Papeira; França

One of the most popular clubs from Pernambuco, Santa Cruz Futebol Clube, was mired in a deep financial crisis through 1942. The club was performing poorly, owed wages to several of its staff, and had to subsist off the revenue from their suburban football fields and the monthly payments from their associates. (Note: Associates are fans who pay annuity fees for benefits like discounted ticket prices and merchandise. For further information, see Sports club § Organization.)

The club's directors decided to take a short tour of the North Region and play in friendly matches against local clubs. They made a deal with Belém-based club Transviário Esporte Clube, arranging for five games to be played in Belém, each costing Santa Cruz five million Brazilian réis.

Santa Cruz signed four new players for the tour. The team's delegation consisted of sixteen players, a president – who also acted as the treasurer and the team's coach – and a referee from the Pernambuco Sports Federation. The tour started in the middle of World War II, while German U-boats were patrolling the Brazilian coast.

== Natal and Belém ==
A map of Brazil with the locations of the toured cities marked. Santa Cruz's home city of Recife is marked with a blue dot.

Santa Cruz's delegation left Recife, Pernambuco, on 2 January 1943, aboard the steam-powered boat Pará. Due to fears of possible Nazi submarine attacks, the boat had to sail with its lights off while being escorted by two Brazilian Navy ships. Two days later, it arrived at Natal, Rio Grande do Norte, where the Pernambuco team won against the local state team 6‍–‍0.

The delegation then traveled to Belém, Pará, playing five games against teams based in the city. They beat Transviário 7‍–‍2 and Tuna Luso 3‍–‍1, drew with the Pará state team 3‍–‍3 and 4‍–‍4 with Paysandu, and subsequently lost to Remo 5‍–‍3.

== Manaus ==
Although the team's delegation intended the matches in Belém to be the last ones of the excursion, they were invited by Olímpico Clube to travel to Manaus, Amazonas, to play against the local teams, making it the first time a team from Pernambuco visited the city. The delegation left for Manaus on 25 January, traveling up the Amazon River aboard a steamboat towing a shipment of food destined for Acre. Traveling at a speed of ten nautical miles (19 km; 12 mi) per day, it took two weeks for the squad to arrive in the state of Amazonas.

The team arrived at Manaus on 7 February. Tired and playing under heavy rain, they lost their first game in Amazonas 3‍–‍2 to Olímpico. Santa Cruz played four more matches there, winning three times (5‍–‍1 and 5‍–‍4 against Rio Negro and 6‍–‍0 against Nacional) and losing once to the local state team. Shortly after the first match against Rio Negro, the head of the delegation and six players suffered from bouts of dysentery. Under medical orders to eat plenty of fruit and vegetables, avoid certain foods like eggs and crustaceans, and drink only mineral water, they recovered and could participate in the next matches.

After the Manaus matches, the club directors planned for an international leg in Peru and Guyana. However, the Brazilian Sports Federation blocked the trip in response to a request from the Ministry of Foreign Affairs, which advised clubs not to leave the country due to World War II. Facing a 90-day suspension if they proceeded with the trip, the team gave up and returned to Belém aboard the steamboat Fortaleza. Three players, Cidinho, Omar, and França, did not return with the squad, as they were "attracted by good offers" from local teams. While traveling to Belém, two players had a relapse of dysentery. Goalkeeper King and striker Papeira were diagnosed with typhoid fever and hospitalized. Both had disobeyed the medical orders; Papeira played barefoot, had cold showers and a few drinks, while King ate liver and eggs for dinner. The delegation intended to return to Recife as soon as possible, but the Brazilian government prohibited all maritime travel on 1 March, a day after they arrived in Belém.

== Belém to Recife ==
Unable to buy plane tickets and needing to cover food and medical costs, the club had to keep playing matches to earn money. Santa Cruz played against Remo on 2 March, winning 4‍–‍2. Shortly before the match, the Belém police chief received a telegram from Manaus ordering the arrest of defender Pedrinho, who was accused of "doing evil to a 17-year-old girl" during his stay in Manaus. It turned out that the police officer who ordered his arrest was the director of an Amazonas club, and was interested in the player's abilities. As the accusation was falsified, the player was never arrested. He would play for Santa Cruz shortly afterwards, being included in the match against Paysandu on 9 March.

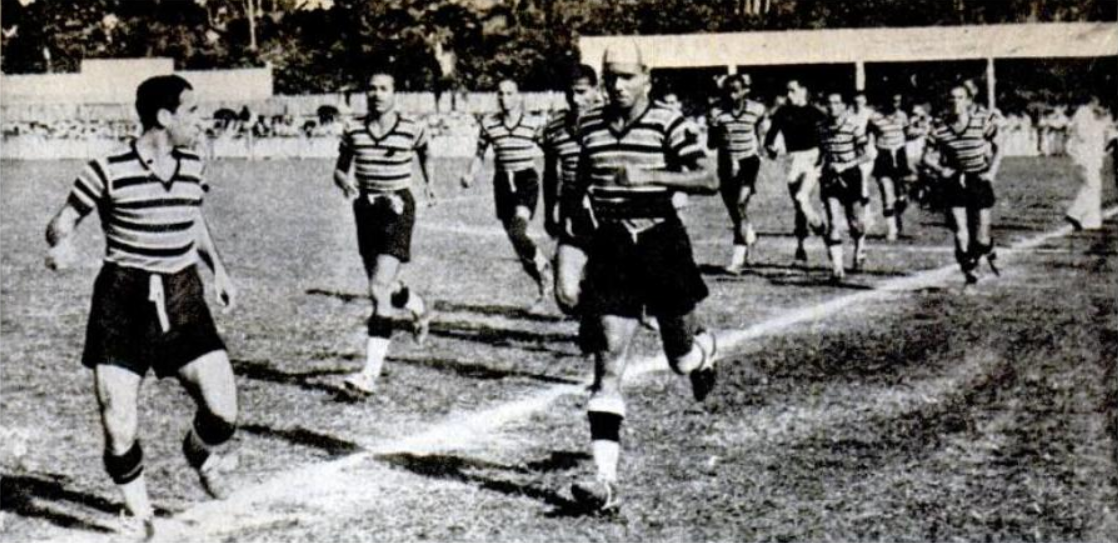
Santa Cruz entering the field before a game in Belém

Santa Cruz suffered their first casualty shortly afterwards, as King died from typhoid fever on 4 March 1943. (Note: Some sources report the date as 3 March.) His funeral was attended by various figures of Pará football, representatives of the CBD and the clubs where he played, and several Pernambuco authorities. The coffin was taken from the Pará Sports Federation headquarters to a cemetery, accompanied by a large crowd. After King's death, Cidinho, who had defected from Santa Cruz a week earlier, returned to the club.

Just three days after the death, the club played against Paysandu. A minute of silence was observed before the match. At 16:30, during the game, the players received the news that Papeira had also died. After the match, the pitch was invaded by fans who commiserated with the players. Paysandu's directors later visited Santa Cruz's delegation and gave them the Cidade do Recife trophy as an act of sympathy. After losing two players, the club directors looked into returning to Recife via air travel, but the hospital and funeral costs left the delegation without money. Santa Cruz played five more games in Belém before starting the journey back via boat to Pernambuco on 28 March.

Traveling first to São Luís, Maranhão, the players had to swap their first-class tickets for third-class ones to save money. They were forced to travel alongside thirty-five thieves being "exported" by Pará police to Maranhão. As a safety measure, the fifteen trophies won by Santa Cruz in the tour were hidden, but this precaution proved unnecessary as the thieves and the players became friends. In São Luís, the boat was detained for security purposes, and the club played six matches there, one of which featured the ship's cook, substituting for an injured player. Santa Cruz originally intended to depart for Recife after a match against Sampaio Corrêa (the fourth in Maranhão), but the delegation decided to play two more matches before leaving. The ship departed at midnight, but had to return to São Luís due to a thunderstorm and the presence of German submarines.

The players then decided to go to Teresina, Piauí, by train. The train derailed twice, but without any casualties. Santa Cruz played another match in Piauí before departing for Fortaleza, Ceará, by bus. There, they played the last match of the excursion, losing to Ceará Sporting Club 3‍–‍2. The excursion ended with either 26 or 28 matches played in total. On 29 April 1943, almost four months after starting the tour, Santa Cruz arrived in Recife. The team began the 1943 season on 2 May with the Campeonato Pernambucano, the state championship. Papeira's suitcase was given to his family, but King's suitcase was lost at sea in São Luís.
