= Bloodfist VII: Manhunt =

- Official DVD cover
- Directed by: Jonathan Winfrey
- Written by: Brendan Broderick; Rob Kerchner
- Produced by: Mike Elliott
- Starring: Don Wilson; Jillian McWhirter; Jonathan Penner; Steven Williams
- Cinematography: Michael Gallagher
- Edited by: Tammis Chandler
- Music by: Elliot Anders; Mike Elliott
- Production company: Hollywood Road Films
- Distributed by: New Concorde
- Release date: 1995
- Running time: 95 min.
- Country: United States
- Language: English

Bloodfist VII: Manhunt is a 1995 American action film directed by Jonathan Winfrey and starring Don Wilson, Jillian McWhirter, Jonathan Penner, and Steven Williams. It was written by Brendan Broderick and Rob Kerchner. A sequel to Bloodfist VI: Ground Zero (1995), it is the seventh installment in the Bloodfist film series.

== Plot summary ==
Jim Trudell is a man pursued. Branded a cop-killer, he must fight simply to stay alive and to clear his name. With the help of the policemen who framed him.

== Cast ==
- Don Wilson as Jim Trudell (credited as Don 'The Dragon' Wilson)
- Jillian McWhirter as Stephanie Williams
- Jonathan Penner as Johnny Marvosa
- Steven Williams as Captain Doyle
- Mindy Seeger as Shelley Zydowski
- Stephen Davies as Special Agent Craig
- Cyril O'Reilly as Tubbs
- Eb Lottimer as Stanton
