= Bloodfist V: Human Target =

- Film poster
- Directed by: Jeff Yonis
- Produced by: Roger Corman
- Starring: Don Wilson; Denice Duff; Steve James
- Music by: David Wurst; Eric Wurst
- Production company: Hollywood Road Films
- Distributed by: New Concorde
- Release date: 1994
- Running time: 83 minutes
- Country: United States
- Language: English

Bloodfist V: Human Target is a 1994 American action film directed by Jeff Yonis and starring Don Wilson, Denice Duff and Steve James. It was written by Rob Kerchner and Jeff Yonis. James succumbed to pancreatic cancer shortly before the movie's release. A sequel to Bloodfist IV: Die Trying (1992), it is the fifth installment in the Bloodfist film series.

== Plot ==
Don "The Dragon" Wilson plays a man who struggles to regain his memory, not knowing who to trust, or even which side he's fighting on.

== Cast ==
- Don "The Dragon" Wilson as Jim Stanton
- Denice Duff as Candy / Michelle
- Steve James as Marcus / Drew Washington
- Kelly Jones Gabriele as Julie
- Wesley Leong as Mr. Wong
- Arin Lustig as Dr. Harding
- Yuji Okumoto as Tommy
- Don Stark as Agent Cory Blake
- Michael Yama as Quan
- Ron Yuan as Sam
- Brian George as U.S. Official
- Remsen Phillips Kerry as Nurse
- Kelly Jones as Doctor's Receptionist
- Sharon Lawrence as Jewelry Store Clerk
