= If I Didn't Know You =

Single by The Red Clay Strays

from the album Grateful
- Released: February 12, 2026
- Genre: Americana; country rock
- Length: 3:28
- Label: RCA; HBYCO
- Songwriters: Natalie Hemby; Drew Nix
- Producer: Dave Cobb

The Red Clay Strays singles chronology
"People Hatin'" (2025)	"If I Didn't Know You" (2026)	"Demons In Your Choir" (2026)

Music video
- "If I Didn't Know You" on YouTube

"If I Didn't Know You" is a song recorded by American country rock band The Red Clay Strays. It was written by Natalie Hemby alongside the band's guitarist Drew Nix, produced by Dave Cobb, and released on February 12, 2026 as the second single from their third studio album Grateful. The music video for the song notably stars comedian Matt Rife.

== Background ==
The Red Clay Strays released their second studio album, and major label debut, Made by These Moments, on July 26, 2024. Rumors of a follow-up began emerging the following year, and were exacerbated by podcaster Joe Rogan, who claimed on his podcast that their third album would be coming in June 2026, something the band later stated that he was not supposed to reveal publicly. The band later officially announced their third album, Grateful on April 23, 2026.

"If I Didn't Know You" was released as the second single on February 12, 2026, and features as the seventh track on the album. In a statement teasing the single, the band posted a short clip of Matt Rife sitting on a bus alongside a snippet of the song's chorus and wrote, "hard to believe this’ll be our first love song released since "Wondering Why". Our next single drops Thursday, February 12th, with a kickass music video starring our buddy @mattrife. Gonna be a good Valentine’s this year".

The band performed the song live for the first time on March 17, 2026 at the Houston Livestock Show and Rodeo.

== Writing and composition ==
The song is a country rock ballad exploring themes of love, growth, gratitude, devotion, and romantic certainty, with the narrator expressing that finding love helped him to keep going and find purpose. Nix explained that the track was inspired by his relationship with his wife Laurie Anne and came from him considering how profoundly she has shaped his life. Of the song, Nix explained, "one day, I was thinking about how thankful I am to have someone who made me want to, as Johnny Cash put it, 'Walk the Line.' I was quite the heathen before my calling, and some of those qualities stayed with me until my wife, Laurie Anne Nix, who was my fiancée at the time, made me want to become a better man. She had high expectations of what her husband should be, and I finally decided to grow up, I don't know what my life would look like if I'd never known her, and honestly, I never want to find out."

== Music video ==
The video for the song was released on February 12, 2026. It was directed by Matthew Coleman, brother of the band's frontman Brandon Coleman, and stars American comedian Matt Rife and his girlfriend, fitness influencer Mariah Morse. In the video, Rife is a lonely man struggling to find meaning in his life who meets Morse by chance when the two board the same bus and begin chatting. When Morse gets off, Rife attempts to track her down in the hopes of establishing a relationship. He ultimately sees her getting onto another bus and chases it down, with the pair later seen moving in together. Rife was a long-time fan of the band prior to starring in the video, having heard "I'm Still Fine" and then falling down a "rabbit hole" of exploring their catalogue. He later finally met them at the Gulf Coast Jam festival in 2025, which led to them asking him to appear in the video for "If I Didn't Know You".

== Charts ==
Chart performance for "If I Didn't Know You"
Chart (2026)	Peak position
US Hot Country Songs (Billboard)	37
US Hot Rock & Alternative Songs (Billboard)	23
