= Demons in Your Choir =

Single by The Red Clay Strays

from the album Grateful
- Released: April 23, 2026
- Genre: Americana; gospel; Southern soul
- Length: 4:16
- Label: RCA; HBYCO
- Songwriters: Brandon Coleman; Dakota Coleman; Matthew Coleman
- Producer: Dave Cobb

The Red Clay Strays singles chronology
"If I Didn't Know You" (2026)	"Demons in Your Choir" (2026)

Music video
- "Demons in Your Choir" on YouTube

"Demons in Your Choir" is a song recorded by American country rock band The Red Clay Strays. It was released on April 23, 2026, via RCA Records as the third single from their third studio album, Grateful. It was written by the band's frontman Brandon Coleman, alongside his brothers Matthew and Dakota Coleman and produced by Dave Cobb.

== Background ==
The Red Clay Strays released their second studio album, and major-label debut, Made by These Moments, on July 26, 2024. Rumors of a follow-up began emerging the following year, and were exacerbated by podcaster Joe Rogan, who claimed on his podcast that their third album would be coming in June 2026, something the band later stated that he was not supposed to reveal publicly. The band later officially announced their third album, Grateful on April 23, 2026.

"Demons in Your Choir" was released as the third single alongside the album announcement on April 23, 2026, and features as the opening track on the album. The band had teased the song a few weeks earlier when they posted a show snippet of music video on social media. They also used a billboard to promote the song's release, which included a number that fans could call to hear part of the track and a message from the band's bass player Andrew Bishop telling them of the release date.

The band performed the song at the 61st Academy of Country Music Awards.

== Writing and composition ==
"Demons in Your Choir" is a gospel-inspired song which explores how even the purest intentions can be laced with sin. The lyrics are from the perspective of a lost soul who risks being led astray by those with darker spirits, referring to them as "demons" in a choir. Discussing the song, frontman and co-writer Brandon Coleman expressed that the track was a "good way to start" the album, as it exemplified a change in sound for the band compared to their previous work.

== Music video ==
The video for the song was released on April 23, 2026, and was directed by Matthew Coleman, one of the song's co-writers. It depicts the band in an empty darkened church performing the track. After the first verse, the lights come on, and the band are joined by a gospel choir. Coleman expressed that having the video be "more performance-based" rather than "narrative-based" like the video for "If I Didn't Know You", Grateful's previous single, was a deliberate choice. The video was filmed over two days.

== Charts ==
Chart performance for "Demons in Your Choir"
Chart (2026)	Peak position
Canada Country (Billboard)	56
US Bubbling Under Hot 100 (Billboard)	3
US Country Airplay (Billboard)	59
US Hot Country Songs (Billboard)	32
US Hot Rock & Alternative Songs (Billboard)	26
