= Wanna Be Loved (disambiguation) =

Wanna Be Loved is a song by the Red Clay Strays.

Wanna Be Loved may also refer to:

- "Wanna Be Loved", a song by DC Talk in their 1998 album Supernatural
- "Wanna Be Loved", a song by Joey Badass from the 2022 album 2000
- "Wanna Be Loved", a song by John Legend from his 2013 album Love in the Future
- "Wanna Be Loved", a song by Michael Rune featuring Natascha Bessez, runner up in Dansk Melodi Grand Prix 2014
