= People Hatin' =

Single by The Red Clay Strays

from the album Grateful
- Released: October 3, 2025
- Genre: Roots rock
- Length: 4:08
- Label: RCA; HBYCO
- Songwriters: Andrew Bishop; Dave Cobb; Brandon Coleman; John Hall; Matthew Coleman; Zach Rishel
- Producer: Dave Cobb

The Red Clay Strays singles chronology
"Drowning" (2024)	"People Hatin'" (2025)	"If I Didn't Know You" (2026)

Music video
- "People Hatin'" on YouTube

"People Hatin'" is a song recorded by American country rock band The Red Clay Strays. It was written by band members Andrew Bishop, Brandon Coleman, John Hall, and Zach Rishel, alongside Matthew Coleman and Dave Cobb, the latter of whom also produced the track. It was released on October 3, 2025 as the lead single from their third studio album Grateful.

== Background ==
The Red Clay Strays released their second studio album, and major label debut, Made by These Moments, on July 26, 2024. Rumors of a follow-up began emerging the following year, and were exacerbated by podcaster Joe Rogan, who claimed on his podcast that their third album would be coming in June 2026, something the band later stated that he was not supposed to reveal publicly. The band later officially announced their third album, Grateful on April 23, 2026.

"People Hatin'" was released on October 3, 2025. Frontman Brandon Coleman stated that the song was recorded in April 2025 and that the band had originally planned to release a different lead single but decided that "People Hatin'" was the right song for the moment following the murder of Charlie Kirk in September and wanting to put out a song expressing their frustrations at political division and calling for unity and tolerance. In their interview with Rogan, Coleman explained, “we got so sick of seeing people put politics above humanity, we actually, we had wrote a song about it in April in the studio, called ‘People Hatin’. We weren’t going to put it out as a single, at first, we were going to do another song, but after the Charlie Kirk thing it was just like, we got together … I think we need to put ‘People Hatin’’ out instead for the first single.” He further stated, “we’ve got to stop killing each other over beliefs, and hating each other over beliefs. Everybody’s race is different, everybody’s experiencing life different, and trying to figure it out the same as you are.”

The band performed the song at the 59th Annual Country Music Association Awards on November 19, 2025.

== Writing and composition ==
Lyrically, "People Hatin'" is the band's response to the division of modern day society. It begins with Coleman singing that he was taught growing up to keep his political opinions to himself, and he expresses his frustration that disagreements now quickly spiral into hostility and people are seemingly incapable of finding common ground with one another. Towards the song's conclusion, Coleman posits that loving one another, particularly those we hate, is the only way towards unity. Sonically, the track features an "angered, repeating chorus", "steady percussion, a long electric guitar bridge and a polished production style that smooths out some of the band’s usual rough edges".

== Music video ==
The song's video was released on October 3, 2025 and was directed by Matthew Coleman, one of the song's co-writers. It features the band performing the song in an all-white room.

== Charts ==
Chart performance for "People Hatin'"
Chart (2025)	Peak position
New Zealand Hot Singles (RMNZ)	35
US Adult Alternative Airplay (Billboard)	27
US Hot Country Songs (Billboard)	38
US Hot Rock & Alternative Songs (Billboard)	15
