= Matt Rife =

American comedian and actor (born 1995)

- Rife in 2024
- Born: Matthew Steven Rife; September 10, 1995 (age 31); Columbus, Ohio, U.S.

Comedy career
- Years active: 2010–present
- Medium: Stand-up; television; film
- Genres: Observational comedy; improvisational comedy; sketch comedy; black comedy; insult comedy; satire
- Subjects: American culture; pop culture; everyday life; self-deprecation; current events
- Website: officialmattrifecomedy.com

Matthew Steven Rife (born September 10, 1995) is an American comedian and actor. He is known for his numerous self-produced comedy specials, namely Only Fans (2021), Matthew Steven Rife (2023), and Walking Red Flag (2023); his 2023 Netflix specials Natural Selection and Lucid, and his Christmas special Unwrapped. Rife is also known for his recurring role on the sketch improv comedy and hip-hop show Wild 'n Out.

== Early life ==
Matthew Steven Rife was born in Columbus, Ohio, and raised in the village of North Lewisburg, Ohio. He also lived in New Albany and Mount Vernon. Rife first took an interest in comedy at 14 years old, when a teacher mentioned a talent show at his high school. After encouragement from a friend, he performed in the show. The next year, he began performing professionally. He has four siblings: three older stepsisters and one younger half-sister.

== Career ==
In 2015, Rife began working as a cast member on Wild 'n Out and in 2017, he was a host on the short-lived reboot of TRL and appeared on MTV's The Challenge: Champs vs. Stars. In 2018, he played a role in the B-movie slasher film Black Pumpkin. Rife is also a paranormal investigator featured on the YouTube channel "Overnight". He was further featured on the television series Bring the Funny in 2019, where he advanced to the semi-final showcase but was eliminated in week 8, and the Netflix special Natural Selection.

Rife has self-produced the comedy specials Only Fans (2021), Matthew Steven Rife (2023), and Walking Red Flag (2023). He also had guest roles on the sketch comedy and improv game show series Wild 'n Out, as Brandon Bliss on the comedy television series Brooklyn Nine-Nine, and as Logan on the sitcom television series Fresh Off the Boat. The New York Times described him in 2022 as "just another struggling road comedian" who then became more popular from TikTok over the following year.

In December 2022, Rife signed with Creative Artists Agency. In April 2023, he released a self-titled special Matthew Steven Rife on Valentine's Day. He then released another special in June 2023 titled Walking Red Flag, focusing on crowd-work. Rife stated that he created an entire special surrounding the topic of audience "red flags" to stop audiences from interrupting his future sets with the bit.

In June 2025, Rife was featured on Forbes Top-Earning Creators list, ranking 7th with estimated earnings of $50 million.

== Controversies ==
On November 15, 2023, Rife released his Netflix standup special Natural Selection, which Vulture reviewed as "half uninspiring dick jokes ... and entirely underwhelming". Cracked stated of the special that the main take aways were "There are lots of women that Rife doesn't care for. He's got it in for waitresses with black eyes (why can't they stay hidden in the kitchen?), hippie chicks, his religious ex, flight attendants who insist on enforcing the rules and the 'heavier set'. The only women he claims to like are the grandmas he wants to bang."

The special attracted controversy due to a domestic violence joke Rife made at the beginning. In a statement in response to the controversy, Rife linked a fake apology note to a website that offered safety helmets for people with disabilities. He attracted further controversy in December 2023 after posting a message to a six-year-old that claimed his mother purchased gifts for him from the profits she earned on the website OnlyFans. He deleted the message after a public rebuke against his comments.

In August 2025, the cosmetics brand e.l.f. released an ad featuring Rife and drag queen Heidi N Closet. The brand immediately received backlash for featuring Rife because of his domestic violence joke made prior. USA Today wrote that, "Rife's alienation of his female audience is the crux of the criticism surrounding e.l.f.'s new ad campaign" and also noted that fans were confused about his involvement in the ad since "Rife has never before been associated with makeup, cosmetics or the beauty space, unlike his commercial co-star". The brand later issued an apology.

In August 2026, Rife garnered controversy when he told an autistic man to commit suicide. He specifically stated, "Sire, you are lifeless douchebag. Please remove yourself from this earth. Absolutely nobody is reading your novels in these comments. You do not matter to anybody. The event has already sold thousands of tickets. Now watch as i [sic] block you and you fall back into nonexistence." This occurred after Rife and his collaborator Elton Castee promoted an event in Salem, Massachusetts on Instagram. In the comments section, Rife stated the above after a man commented about the Salem witch trials on his post. There is no evidence to prove that Rife knew about the man's condition beforehand. The exchange has since been deleted. The family of the man demanded an apology from Rife as a result, and Rife was further criticized for overcharging fees for the event.

== Influences ==
Rife has said his biggest influences in comedy are Dave Chappelle, Ricky Gervais, and Dane Cook. Rife performed at Dave Chappelle's 50th birthday show at Madison Square Garden and has called Chappelle a mentor. He has also said Adam Sandler, Jim Carrey, Jim Varney, David Spade, Pauly Shore, and Robin Williams are people by whom he was influenced.

== Personal life ==
Rife resides in Rhode Island near Burrillville. He identifies as a Christian but is not religious, stating in an Instagram post that "I wear a Jesus cross around my neck for the same reason regular dudes wear NBA player basketball jerseys – I've never met the guy, but I tell people I can dunk like him at LA Fitness."

In his 2021 special Only Fans, Rife discussed his clinical depression and anxiety disorder diagnoses.

Rife and Elton Castee acquired Ed and Lorraine Warren's former home with their Occult Museum in Monroe, Connecticut, in late July 2025. They were to be the legal guardians of the property's haunted artifacts for the following five years. Rife also mentioned that he planned to host tours as well as allow overnight stays at the property.

== Filmography ==
=== Film ===
Year	Title	Role	Notes	Refs.
2015	Room 236	Matt / Premier Poker Club Orlando		
2017	Sophomore Year	Jake Riker		
2018	Black Pumpkin	Flash		
2018	The Debt	Matt	Short film	
2019	American Typecast	Robber No. 2	Short film	
2021	After Masks	Wolf	Segment: "Winners"	
2021	The Elevator	Michael Juniper		
2021	Death Link	Darrin		
2021	Just Swipe	Colin		
2022	North of the 10	Matt Downes		
2022	The Curse of Wolf Mountain	James		
2023	Karma's a Bitch	Kyle		
2023	Candy Flip	Nathan		
2023	Trapped Inn	Connor	Also executive producer	
2023	The Private Eye	Mort Madison		
2023	Don't Suck	Ethan		
2025	I Live Here Now	Travis		
2026	Rolling Loud	Terry		

=== Television ===
Year	Title	Role	Notes	Refs.
2014	Average Joe	Danny	3 episodes	
2015–2017; 2020–2021, 2023	Wild 'n Out	Himself	16 episodes	
2015–2016	Gamer's Guide to Pretty Much Everything	Doyle O'Doyle	2 episodes	
2016	Wild 'N on Tour	Himself	10 episodes	
2016	WTH: Welcome to Howler	Jesse	7 episodes	
2017–2018	The Challenge: Champs vs. Stars	Himself	8 episodes	
2019	Brooklyn Nine-Nine	Brandon Bliss	Episode: "The Tattler"	
2019	Stalked by My Doctor: A Sleepwalker's Nightmare	Leo	Television film	
2019	Bring the Funny	Himself	Episode: "The Open Mic 1"	
2020	Fresh Off the Boat	Logan	Episode: "Mommy and Me"	
2021	Burb Patrol	Alex	10 episodes	
2024	That '90s Show	Travis	Episode: "Friends in Low Places"	
2025	Mo	Jeff	Episode: "Oso Palestino (the Palestinian Bear)"	
2025	Ghost Adventures	Himself	Episode: "Abandoned at Whiskey Pete's"	
2026	Scrubs	Logan Nichols	Episode: "My Poker Face"	
2026	The Altruists	Ryan Salame	Main role	
2026	Hell's Kitchen	Himself	Chef's table guest diner for the red team; Episode: "A Slice Above the Rest"	

=== Stand-up ===
Year	Title	Notes	Ref(s)
2020	ATL Comedy Arts Fest, Volume 2	Also writer	
2021	Matt Rife: Only Fans	Also writer and executive producer; YouTube special	
2023	Matthew Steven Rife	Also writer and executive producer; YouTube special	
2023	Walking Red Flag	Also writer; YouTube special	
2023	Natural Selection	Also writer and executive producer; Netflix special	
2024	Matt Rife: Lucid – A Crowd Work Special	Netflix special	
2025	Matt Rife - A Christmas Crowd Work Special	Netflix special	

=== Music videos ===
Year	Title	Artist	Ref(s)
2026	"If I Didn't Know You"	The Red Clay Strays	
