= Country Music Association Award for Vocal Group of the Year =

Annual music award

- Country: United States
- Presented by: Country Music Association
- First award: 1967
- Currently held by: The Red Clay Strays (2026)

The following list shows the recipients for the Country Music Association Award for Vocal Group of the Year. The award is based on the musical performance of the group on solo country single or album release, as well as their overall contribution to country music during the eligibility period. For the purposes of the award, a group is defined as "an act composed of three or more people, both of whom normally perform together and none of whom are known primarily as individual performing artists", though this was not always the case. In 1970, a separate category was established for vocal duos.

The inaugural recipients were The Stoneman Family in 1967. The Statler Brothers hold the record for most wins in the category, with nine, while three-time recipients Alabama hold the record for most nominations, with twenty one. To date, The Judds and the Dixie Chicks are the only all-female groups to win the award. Zac Brown Band holds the record for most nominations without a win, with twelve.

== Recipients ==
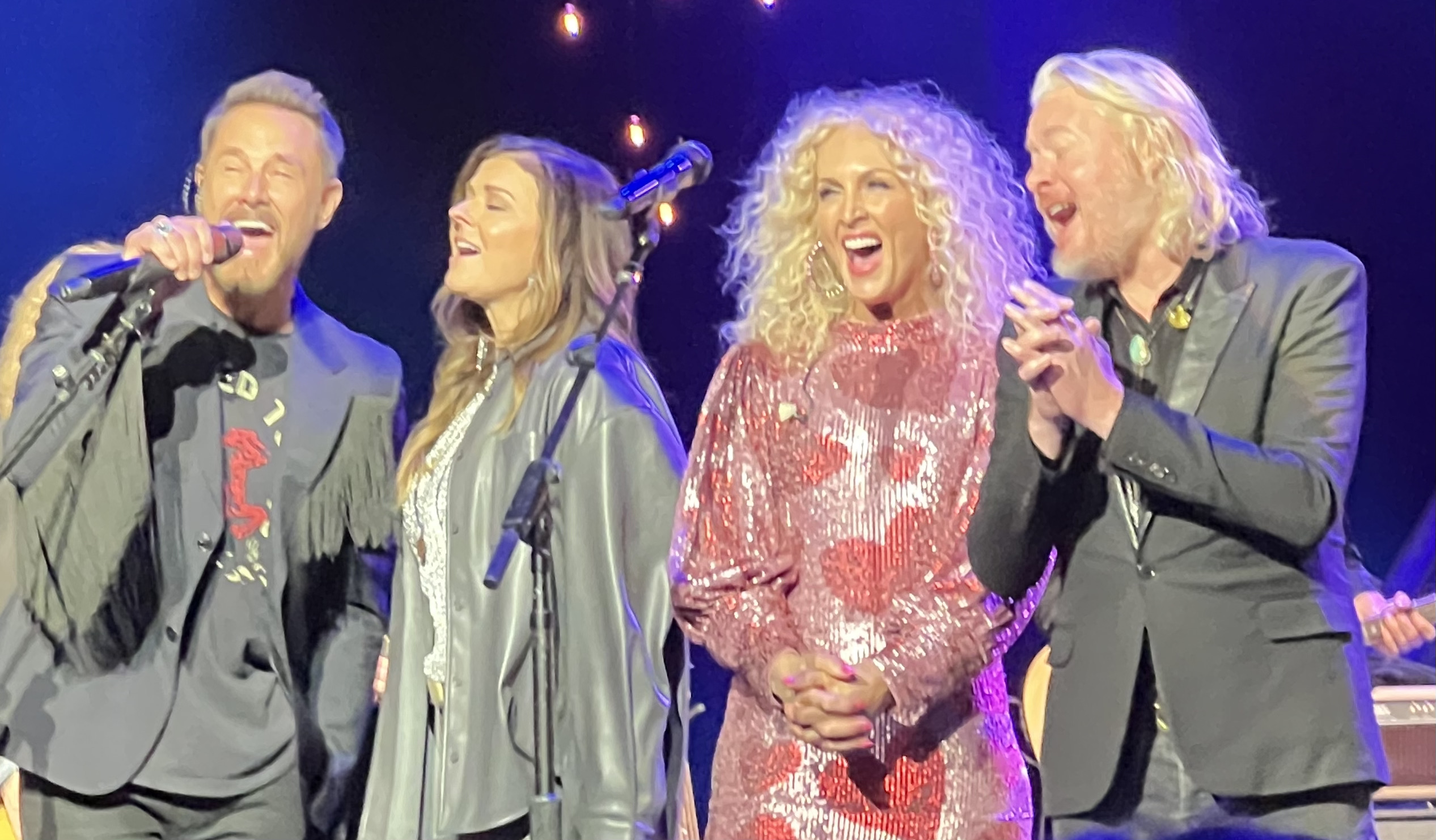
Quartet Little Big Town have six wins in this category.

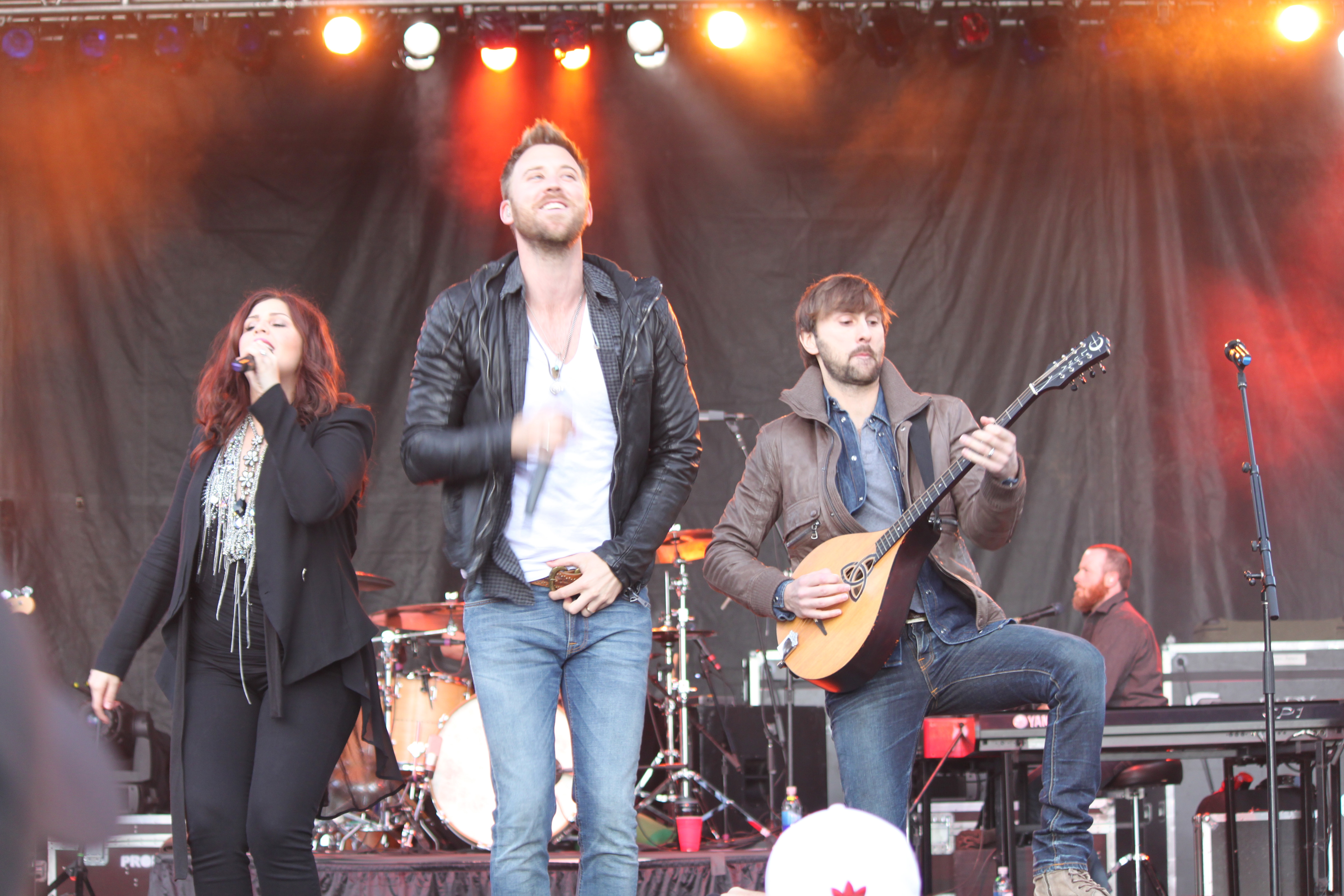
Three-time recipients Lady Antebellum/Lady A.

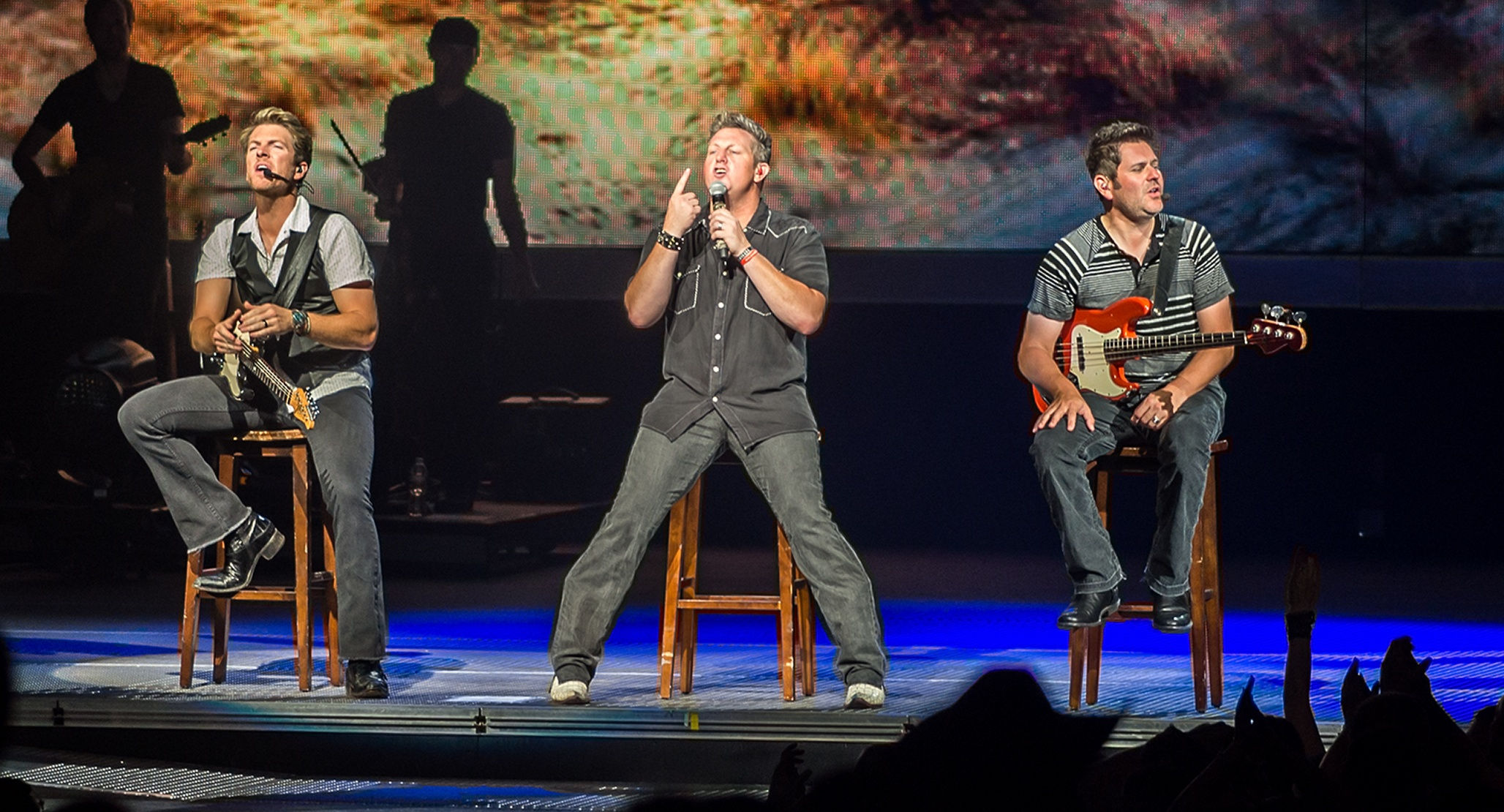
Rascal Flatts have won the award six times.

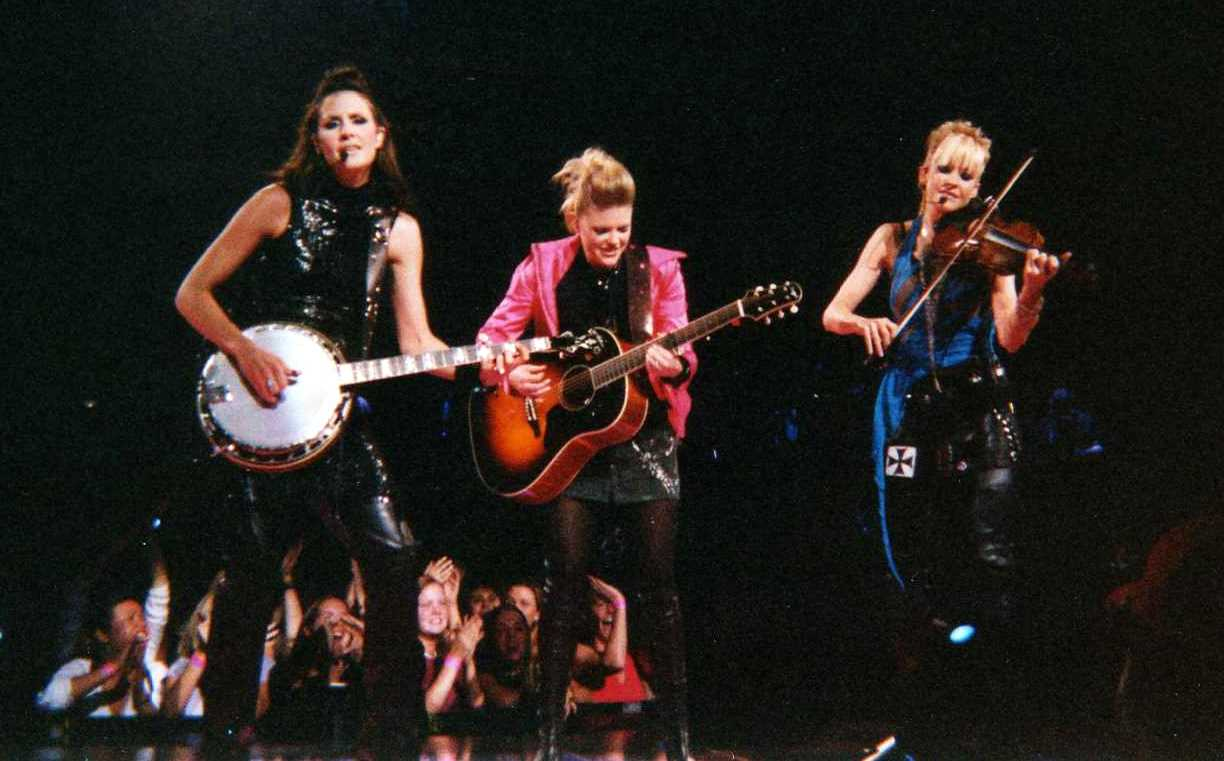
Four-time winners Dixie Chicks.

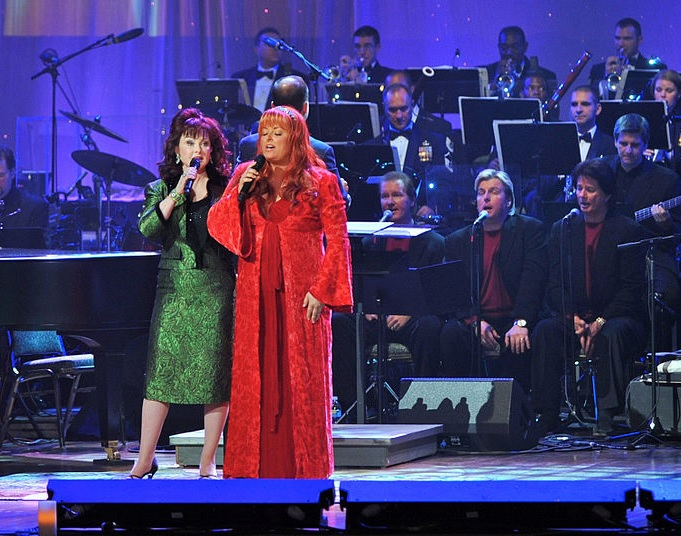
Three-time honorees The Judds were the first all-female winners.

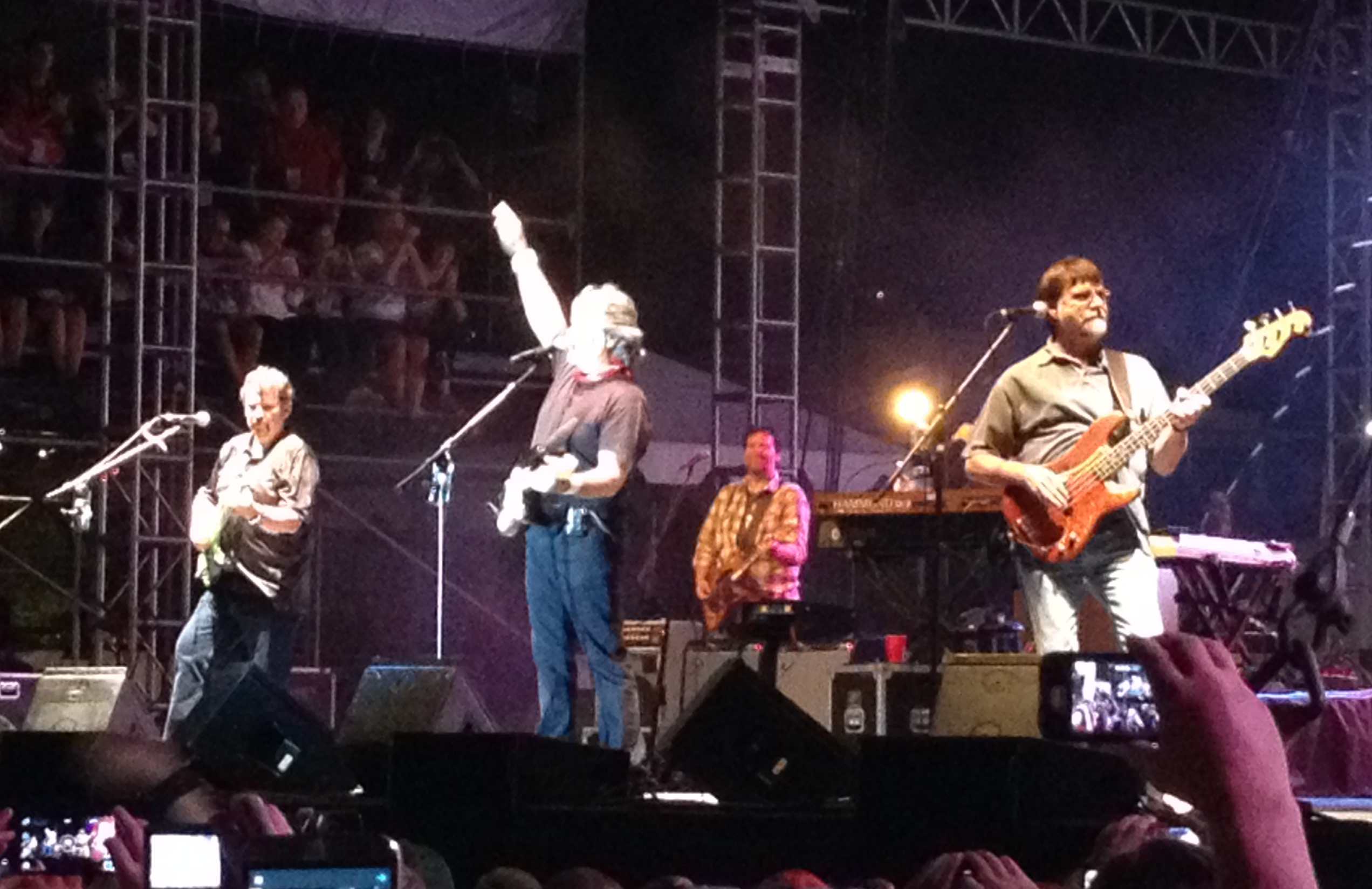
Alabama are three-time recipients of the award.

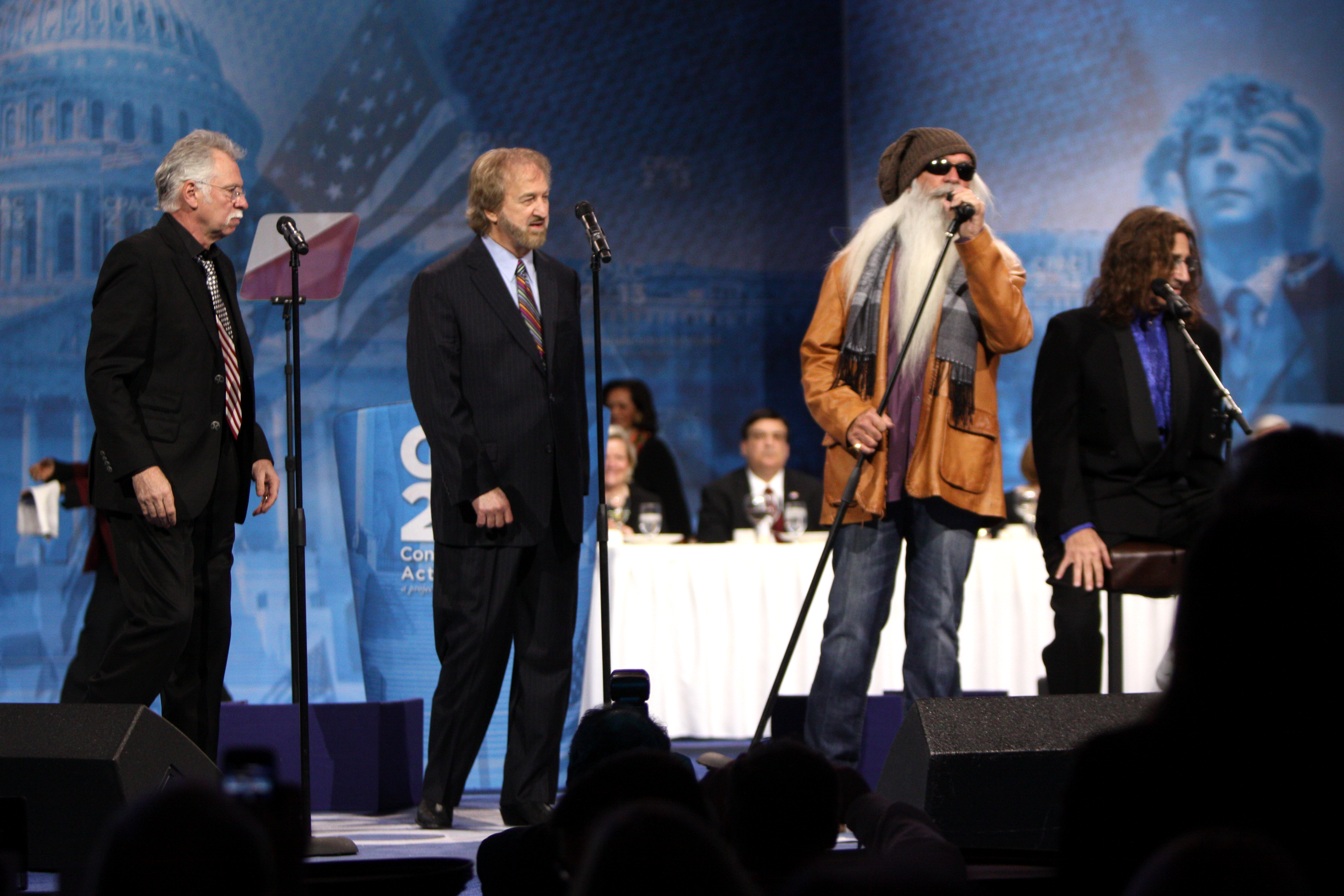
1978 recipients The Oak Ridge Boys.

Year	Winner	Nominees
2026	The Red Clay Strays	Lady A; Little Big Town; Midland; Old Dominion
2025	The Red Clay Strays	Lady A; Little Big Town; Old Dominion; Rascal Flatts
2024	Old Dominion	Lady A; Little Big Town; The Red Clay Strays; Zac Brown Band
2023	Old Dominion	Lady A; Little Big Town; Midland; Zac Brown Band
2022	Old Dominion	Lady A; Little Big Town; Midland; Zac Brown Band
2021	Old Dominion	Lady A; Little Big Town; Midland; Zac Brown Band
2020	Old Dominion	Lady A; Little Big Town; Midland; Rascal Flatts
2019	Old Dominion	Lady Antebellum; Little Big Town; Midland; Zac Brown Band
2018	Old Dominion	Lady Antebellum; LANCO; Little Big Town; Midland
2017	Little Big Town	Old Dominion; Rascal Flatts; Zac Brown Band; Lady Antebellum
2016	Little Big Town	Old Dominion; Rascal Flatts; Zac Brown Band; Lady Antebellum
2015	Little Big Town	Rascal Flatts; The Band Perry; Lady Antebellum; Zac Brown Band
2014	Little Big Town	Eli Young Band; Lady Antebellum; The Band Perry; Zac Brown Band
2013	Little Big Town	Eli Young Band; Lady Antebellum; The Band Perry; Zac Brown Band
2012	Little Big Town	Eli Young Band; Lady Antebellum; The Band Perry; Zac Brown Band
2011	Lady Antebellum	Little Big Town; Rascal Flatts; The Band Perry; Zac Brown Band
2010	Lady Antebellum	Little Big Town; Rascal Flatts; The Band Perry; Zac Brown Band
2009	Lady Antebellum	Eagles; Little Big Town; Rascal Flatts; Zac Brown Band
2008	Rascal Flatts	Eagles; Emerson Drive; Lady Antebellum; Little Big Town
2007	Rascal Flatts	Alison Krauss and Union Station; Dixie Chicks; Emerson Drive; Little Big Town
2006	Rascal Flatts	Alison Krauss and Union Station; Little Big Town; Lonestar; Sugarland
2005	Rascal Flatts	Alison Krauss and Union Station; Diamond Rio; Lonestar; Sugarland
2004	Rascal Flatts	Alabama; Diamond Rio; Lonestar; Trick Pony
2003	Rascal Flatts	Alabama; Diamond Rio; Dixie Chicks; Lonestar
2002	Dixie Chicks	Diamond Rio; Lonestar; Nickel Creek; Rascal Flatts
2001	Lonestar	Alabama; Diamond Rio; Dixie Chicks; Nickel Creek
2000	Dixie Chicks	Alabama; Asleep at the Wheel; Diamond Rio; Lonestar
1999	Dixie Chicks	Alabama; Diamond Rio; Lonestar; The Wilkinsons
1998	Dixie Chicks	Alabama; Diamond Rio; The Mavericks; Sawyer Brown
1997	Diamond Rio	Alabama; The Mavericks; Ricochet; Sawyer Brown
1996	The Mavericks	Alabama; Blackhawk; Diamond Rio; Sawyer Brown
1995	The Mavericks	Blackhawk (band); Diamond Rio; Sawyer Brown; Shenandoah
1994	Diamond Rio	Alabama; Little Texas; Sawyer Brown; Confederate Railroad
1993	Diamond Rio	Alabama; Confederate Railroad; Restless Heart; Sawyer Brown
1992	Diamond Rio	Alabama; McBride & the Ride; Sawyer Brown; Shenandoah
1991	Kentucky Headhunters	Alabama; Diamond Rio; Restless Heart; Shenandoah
1990	Kentucky Headhunters	Desert Rose Band; Highway 101; Restless Heart; Shenandoah
1989	Highway 101	Alabama; Desert Rose Band; Restless Heart; Shenandoah
1988	Highway 101	Alabama; The Forester Sisters; Nitty Gritty Dirt Band; Restless Heart
1987	The Judds	Alabama; Asleep at the Wheel; Exile; Restless Heart
1986	The Judds	Exile; The Forester Sisters; Nitty Gritty Dirt Band; The Oak Ridge Boys
1985	The Judds	Alabama; Exile; The Oak Ridge Boys; The Whites
1984	The Statler Brothers	Alabama; Exile; The Judds; The Oak Ridge Boys
1983	Alabama	The Bellamy Brothers; The Oak Ridge Boys; The Statler Brothers; The Whites
1982	Alabama	Larry Gatlin and The Gatlin Brothers; The Oak Ridge Boys; The Statler Brothers; Tompall & the Glaser Brothers
1981	Alabama	The Bellamy Brothers; Larry Gatlin and The Gatlin Brothers; The Oak Ridge Boys; The Statler Brothers
1980	The Statler Brothers	Alabama; Charlie Daniels Band; Larry Gatlin and The Gatlin Brothers; The Oak Ridge Boys
1979	The Statler Brothers	Charlie Daniels Band; Dave & Sugar; The Kendalls; The Oak Ridge Boys
1978	The Oak Ridge Boys	Dave & Sugar; The Kendalls; Texas Playboys; The Statler Brothers
1977	The Statler Brothers	Asleep at the Wheel; Dave & Sugar; Eagles; The Oak Ridge Boys
1976	The Statler Brothers	Amazing Rhythm Aces; Asleep at the Wheel; Dave & Sugar; Eagles
1975	The Statler Brothers	Asleep at the Wheel; Four Guys; The Osborne Brothers; The Pointer Sisters
1974	The Statler Brothers	Brush Arbor Band; The Buckaroos; The Jordanaires; The Osborne Brothers
1973	The Statler Brothers	The Carter Family; The Jordanaires; The Osborne Brothers; Tompall and the Glaser Brothers
1972	The Statler Brothers	The Carter Family; The Osborne Brothers; Tompall & the Glaser Brothers; The Wilburn Brothers
1971	The Osborne Brothers	The Carter Family; The Hager Brothers; The Statler Brothers; Tompall & the Glaser Brothers
1970	Tompall & the Glaser Brothers	The Carter Family; The Osborne Brothers; Jack Blanchard & Misty Morgan
1969	Johnny Cash and June Carter Cash	Tompall & the Glaser Brothers; Don Gibson and Dottie West; Glen Campbell and Bobbie Gentry; Dolly Parton and Porter Wagoner
1968	Dolly Parton and Porter Wagoner	The Stoneman Family; Archie Campbell and Lorene Mann; Bill Anderson and Jan Howard; Johnny Cash and June Carter Cash
1967	The Stoneman Family	The Anita Kerr Singers; The Browns; The Statler Brothers; Johnny Cash and June Carter Cash; Tammy Wynette and David Houston

== Artists with multiple wins ==
Groups that received multiple awards
Awards	Artist
9	The Statler Brothers
7	Old Dominion
6	Little Big Town
6	Rascal Flatts
4	Diamond Rio
4	Dixie Chicks
3	Alabama
3	Lady Antebellum
3	The Judds
2	Highway 101
2	Kentucky Headhunters
2	The Mavericks
2	The Red Clay Strays

=== Won on first nomination ===
In CMA history, only six groups have won Vocal Group of the Year the very first time they were nominated. They are:

- The Stoneman Family (1967)
- Dolly Parton and Porter Wagoner (1968)
- Highway 101 (1988)
- Kentucky Headhunters (1990)
- The Mavericks (1995)
- Dixie Chicks (1998)

== Artists with multiple nominations ==
21 nominations

- Alabama
- Little Big Town

18 nominations

- Lady Antebellum

15 nominations

- The Statler Brothers
- Diamond Rio

14 nominations

- Rascal Flatts
- Zac Brown Band

10 nominations

- Oak Ridge Boys
- Old Dominion

8 nominations

- Lonestar

7 nominations

- Dixie Chicks
- Sawyer Brown
- Midland

6 nominations

- Osborne Brothers
- Restless Heart
- The Band Perry
- Tompall and the Glaser Brothers

5 nominations

- Asleep at the Wheel
- Shenandoah

4 nominations

- Dave & Sugar
- Eagles
- Exile
- The Carter Family
- The Judds
- The Mavericks

3 nominations

- Alison Krauss & Union Station
- Eli Young Band
- Highway 101
- Johnny Cash and June Carter Cash
- Larry Gatlin and the Gatlin Brothers
- The Red Clay Strays

2 nominations

- Blackhawk
- Charlie Daniels Band
- Confederate Railroad
- Desert Rose Band
- Dolly Parton and Porter Wagoner
- Emerson Drive
- Kentucky Headhunters
- Nickel Creek
- Nitty Gritty Dirt Band
- Sugarland
- The Bellamy Brothers
- The Forester Sisters
- The Jordanaires
- The Kendalls
- The Stoneman Family
- The Whites
