= Four Movements =

- Brooklyn Nine-Nine episode
- Episode no.: Season 6 Episode 4
- Directed by: Luke Del Tredici
- Written by: Phil Augusta Jackson
- Cinematography by: Giovani Lampassi
- Editing by: Jason Gill
- Production code: 604
- Original air date: January 31, 2019
- Running time: 21 minutes

Guest appearances
- Mario Lopez as himself; Eugene Lee Yang as Theo Lorql

Episode chronology
← Previous "The Tattler"	Next → "A Tale of Two Bandits"
- Brooklyn Nine-Nine season 6

"Four Movements" is the fourth episode of the sixth season of the American television police sitcom series Brooklyn Nine-Nine, and the 116th overall episode of the series. The episode was written by David Phillips and directed by Jennifer Arnold. It aired on January 31, 2019 on NBC.

The show revolves around the fictitious 99th precinct of the New York Police Department in Brooklyn and the officers and detectives that work in the precinct. In the episode, Gina announces her decision to leave the precinct to follow her dreams and sets to give everyone a "Gina moment" before she leaves. The episode marks Chelsea Peretti's last episode as a series regular.

According to Nielsen Media Research, the episode was seen by an estimated 2.72 million household viewers and gained a 0.8/4 ratings share among adults aged 18–49. The episode received mostly positive reviews from critics, who praised the episode as a great farewell for Chelsea Peretti.

== Plot ==
Gina (Chelsea Peretti) announces that she is leaving the precinct and will set to spend a "Gina moment" with everyone that she deems unforgettable before quitting in two weeks.

Her first moment is with Captain Holt (Andre Braugher), whom she has been playing chess with and every time, Holt wins. During their games, Holt questions Gina about her choice and worries about health insurance and her own baby, telling her that she needs a plan. Holt eventually comes to realize that even the best-laid plans don't work out, as despite planning for it for a long time he was not able to become Commissioner. Her second moment is a lunch date with Amy (Melissa Fumero) and Rosa (Stephanie Beatriz) where Amy makes an entire book made of Gina's tweets. Gina is embarrassed and asks Amy to burn the book in a fire dump. Amy can't bring herself to do it, and Gina reveals that this was her moment for Amy: telling Amy to be herself and never change. She inadvertently also gets Rosa to get emotional about this.

Her next moment is with Jake, who has set a meeting in a social club with actor Mario Lopez. After narrowly passing the entrance, Jake distracts the bodyguards so Gina can meet the actor and invite him to a party in the bar. However, in the bar, Gina refuses to let Lopez get inside, much to Jake's shock. She reveals that her moment was making clear she didn't need a celebrity there, when she had all she wanted: her friends. The next day and despite the farewell party, she shows up at the precinct and gives Boyle (Joe Lo Truglio) a familiar jar. Terry (Terry Crews) gets annoyed he never got a "Gina moment". Despite this, Gina keeps showing up at work and Jake deduces that she's afraid to leave. After the precinct agrees to support her, they find a Gina golden statue and a video where Gina thanks them for everything and gives Terry his moment by signing him up for a yogurt club.

== Reception ==
=== Viewers ===
In its original American broadcast, "Four Movements" was seen by an estimated 2.72 million household viewers and gained a 0.8/4 share among adults aged 18–49, according to Nielsen Media Research. This was a slight decrease from the previous episode, which was watched by 2.75 million viewers with a 0.9/4 in the 18-49 demographics. This means that 0.8 percent of all households with televisions watched the episode, while 4 percent of all households watching television at that time watched it.

=== Critical reviews ===
"Four Movements" received mostly positive reviews from critics. LaToya Ferguson of The A.V. Club gave the episode an "A" grade and wrote, "Brooklyn Nine-Nine's farewell to Gina Linetti (and Chelsea Peretti) could only end one way—as over-the-top as possible, hopefully without devolving much into cartoon territory — and 'Four Movements,' simply had to live up to that expectation. It does, and it does so in both a hilarious and intelligent manner, bouncing back from last week's set-up episode to give this character a great goodbye. And hopefully, it's a goodbye you can appreciate even if you're not a Gina Linetti fan."

Alan Sepinwall of Rolling Stone wrote: "How appropriate, then, that the marvelous 'Four Movements' was so reminiscent of The Office's 'Goodbye Michael' — not in plot or tone, but in the sense that every different persona of this wildly unpredictable character managed to be on display in the same episode. In seeing her say goodbye to her coworkers, we got to see the many different iterations of Gina Linetti, as well as the many different modes even a show this fundamentally silly can handle."

Nick Harley of Den of Geek gave the episode a 3.5 star rating out of 5 and wrote "While 'Four Movements' doesn't necessarily stick the landing, its imperfect nature mirrors Gina's run on the show itself: random, funny, occasionally able to be touching, and a little extraneous. As much as I enjoy the character, I don't think Gina's absence will be a detriment for the series, and as stated above, I'm sure we'll be seeing the character again sooner rather than later."
