= A Tale of Two Bandits =

- Brooklyn Nine-Nine episode
- Episode no.: Season 6 Episode 5
- Directed by: Cortney Carrillo
- Written by: Luke Del Tredici
- Cinematography by: Giovani Lampassi
- Editing by: Jason Gill
- Production code: 605
- Original air date: February 7, 2019
- Running time: 21 minutes

Guest appearances
- Craig Robinson as Doug Judy; Nicole Byer as Trudy Judy; Rob Riggle as Rob Dulubnik

Episode chronology
← Previous "Four Movements"	Next → "The Crime Scene"
- Brooklyn Nine-Nine season 6

"A Tale of Two Bandits" is the fifth episode of the sixth season of the American television police sitcom series Brooklyn Nine-Nine, and the 117th overall episode of the series. The episode was written by Luke Del Tredici and directed by Cortney Carrillo. It aired on February 7, 2019 on NBC.

The show revolves around the fictitious 99th precinct of the New York Police Department in Brooklyn and the officers and detectives that work in the precinct. In the episode, Doug Judy fakes his death and asks Jake and Terry on help in finding his copycat who's been stealing cars using his MO, later revealed to be his own sister Trudy Judy. Meanwhile, the rest of the squad challenges the firefighters to a drink-off, the prize being Shaw's Bar.

According to Nielsen Media Research, the episode was seen by an estimated 3.04 million household viewers and gained a 0.9/4 ratings share among adults aged 18–49. The episode received mostly positive reviews from critics, who praised Byer's and Robinson's performance.

== Plot ==
Jake (Andy Samberg) and Terry (Terry Crews) discover that Doug Judy (Craig Robinson) has died and go to his funeral. As Jake is giving a eulogy, he sees Judy, alive and well, and realizes that he faked his death.

Judy explains that he faked his death after a major drug lord put a hit out on him after someone stole the lord's favorite Ferrari using Judy’s MO. Jake and Terry agree to help him and agree to meet at a bar where the thief will most likely be. After Terry sends police enforcements to the bar, the trio discover that Judy’s sister Trudy Judy (Nicole Byer) was the one who stole the Ferrari using her brother’s MO. In exchange for a reduced sentence, Trudy agrees to help them recover the Ferrari and set up a sting operation to capture the drug lord. At the sting operation, they manage to arrest the drug lord, but Trudy betrays them and drives away, effectively becoming the new Pontiac Bandit.

Meanwhile, the rest of the squad discovers that the FDNY has taken over Shaw’s Bar and challenge them to a drink-off for the bar. Holt (Andre Braugher) leaves, claiming that it’s not a big deal and they can find another bar. However, after receiving a drunken voicemail from Rosa (Stephanie Beatriz), Holt realizes how much Shaw’s means to the squad and returns, eventually leading the team to victory.

== Reception ==
=== Viewers ===
According to Nielsen Media Research, the episode was seen by an estimated 3.04 million household viewers and gained a 0.9/4 ratings share among adults aged 18–49. This means that 0.9 percent of all households with televisions watched the episode, while 4 percent of all households watching television at that time watched it.

=== Critical response ===
"A Tale of Two Bandits" received mostly positive reviews from critics. Alan Sepinwall of Rolling Stone praised Byer's performance, writing, "The role of Trudy, in addition to allowing for lots of rhymes, got to upend that expectation by revealing that she’s actually an even more ruthless criminal mastermind than her brother, and has been playing Doug, Jake and the rightfully suspicious Terry the entire time. It’s a fun twist, and the closing scenes where we get to see Trudy at her worst have me hoping this isn’t Byer’s last appearance on the show." However, LaToya Ferguson of The A.V. Club gave the episode a C+ and wrote, "While it’s funny for even Jake to get things jumbled after all the misadventures he’s had just with Doug Judy alone, once the episode just keeps referencing things that have happened in the series, this particular narrative approach really sticks out. And as the series just had an episode where a main character leaves to go figure out what’s next for herself, it’s interesting that this episode chooses to look back instead of move forward."
