= The Crime Scene =

- Brooklyn Nine-Nine episode
- Episode no.: Season 6 Episode 6
- Directed by: Michael McDonald
- Written by: Justin Noble
- Cinematography by: Giovani Lampassi
- Editing by: Jason Gill
- Production code: 606
- Original air date: February 14, 2019
- Running time: 21 minutes

Guest appearances
- Michael Mosley as Franco McCoy; Olga Merediz as Julia Diaz

Episode chronology
← Previous "A Tale of Two Bandits"	Next → "The Honeypot"
- Brooklyn Nine-Nine season 6

"The Crime Scene" is the sixth episode of the sixth season of the American television police sitcom series Brooklyn Nine-Nine, and the 118th overall episode of the series. The episode was written by Justin Noble and directed by Michael McDonald. It aired on February 14, 2019 on NBC.

The show revolves around the fictitious 99th precinct of the New York Police Department in Brooklyn and the officers and detectives that work in the precinct. In the episode, Jake (Andy Samberg) and Rosa (Stephanie Beatriz) investigate a murder, which proves to be difficult, especially when Jake promises the victim's mother they'll find the murderer.

According to Nielsen Media Research, the episode was seen by an estimated 2.56 million household viewers and gained a 0.8/4 ratings share among adults aged 18–49. The episode received positive reviews from critics, who praised Jake's characterization and also praised the ending scene.

== Plot ==
Jake (Andy Samberg) and Rosa (Stephanie Beatriz) investigate the murder of a young man. Throughout the episode, Rosa gets numerous different hairstyles, given to her by her girlfriend Jocelyn. After Jake sees how devastated the victim's mother is, he promises her that he will find the killer, much to Rosa's chagrin.

Over the course of two months, Jake goes crazy trying to solve the case, which causes Rosa to worry about him. Eventually, Rosa decides to hand the case over to the Major Crimes unit, upsetting Jake. However, Jake decides to continue trying to solve the case, eventually scaring his wife Amy (Melissa Fumero). Rosa eventually gets him to stop and to admit to the victim's mother that they can't solve the case. However, after seeing that the mother feels guilty for her son's death, Rosa herself decides to reopen the case and solve it.

After reentering the crime scene, Jake and Rosa realize that there was one place which they hadn't checked: the vents. Sure enough, they find a lead, and through security footage, discover that the killer had been hiding in the vents for days before and after the murder, and had escaped using a forensic analyst disguise. With this evidence, they finally manage to catch the killer. At the end of the episode, Rosa reveals to Jake that the way he sympathized with the victim's mother had inspired her to reconcile with her own mother (Olga Merediz), who initially hadn't responded well when Rosa came out as bisexual.

== Reception ==
=== Ratings ===
According to Nielsen Media Research, the episode was seen by an estimated 2.56 million household viewers and gained a 0.8/4 ratings share among adults aged 18–49. This means that 0.8 percent of all households with televisions watched the episode, while 4 percent of all households watching television at that time watched it.

=== Reception ===
"The Crime Scene" received positive reviews from critics. Kayla Kumari Upadhyaya of The A.V. Club gave the episode an "A" rating, writing, "Jake has some serious boundary issues as a result of his parents’ actions, and the way they surface in “The Crime Scene” feels organic and meaningful. Brooklyn Nine-Nine sharply injects this very straightforward plotline with emotional depth like that throughout. His colleagues mock his rookie mistake, but Jake’s promise to the victim’s mother comes from a real place for the character. He messed up, but he did so in a way that doesn’t undercut who he is and what he stands for but rather celebrates it."

Kumari Upadhyaya also wrote of the ending scene, "Brooklyn Nine-Nine also poignantly seizes the opportunity to delve back into some of the character development around Rosa’s sexuality and her coming out process with her parents. While she’s meeting Jocelyn’s parents, she isn’t ready to introduce her to her own parents, because she hasn’t heard from them since she came out as bi. She says outright that it sucks, and it’s moving to see this more vulnerable side of Rosa. The fact that she’s opening up so much to Jake is indicative of their friendship’s weight, too."
