= The Tattler (Brooklyn Nine-Nine) =

- Brooklyn Nine-Nine episode
- Episode no.: Season 6 Episode 3
- Directed by: Jennifer Arnold
- Written by: David Phillips
- Cinematography by: Giovani Lampassi
- Editing by: Jason Gill
- Production code: 603
- Original air date: January 24, 2019
- Running time: 21 minutes

Guest appearances
- Paul Rust as Mikey Joseph; Yassir Lester as Quentin Chase; Matt Rife as Brandon Bliss

Episode chronology
← Previous "Hitchcock & Scully"	Next → "Four Movements"
- Brooklyn Nine-Nine season 6

"The Tattler" is the third episode of the sixth season of the American television police sitcom series Brooklyn Nine-Nine, and the 115th overall episode of the series. The episode was written by David Phillips and directed by Jennifer Arnold.

The show revolves around the fictitious 99th precinct of the New York Police Department in Brooklyn and the officers and detectives that work in the precinct. In the episode, Jake and Gina attend their 20-year high school reunion with Amy, where Jake has been mocked for being the "Tattler" in an incident that ruined his senior year so he and Amy set to find out the real tattler while Gina tries marketing herself in front of a potential investor. Meanwhile, Holt, Terry, Hitchcock, and Scully participate in a radio contest and Boyle tries to help Rosa to choose between two love-interests.

According to Nielsen Media Research, the episode was seen by an estimated 2.75 million household viewers and gained a 0.9/4 ratings share among adults aged 18–49. The episode received generally positive reviews from critics, who praised the high-school parts, although Gina's characterization and the subplots received a more mixed response.

== Plot ==
Jake (Andy Samberg) and Gina (Chelsea Peretti) attend their 20-year high school reunion with Amy (Melissa Fumero) coming with them. Jake is worried, as his high school reputation was affected after an incident where a forthcoming robbery of a school van was cancelled after someone told the principal and everyone assumed it was Jake, earning him the nickname "The Tattler" and ruining his senior year.

At the reunion, Jake is quickly reminded of his "tattler" status and decides to investigate with Amy and find the real tattler. While this happens, Gina meets with a potential investor after she fakes being an app creator. Jake finds out from a fellow classmate that he saw the tattler and had the exact same clothes as Jake. Jake finds out the tattler was actually Gina, as she was the only one with the same clothes. He confronts her, and she reveals that she tattled because Jake could have been involved in the robbery and would wind up in jail, effectively ending his dream of being a cop. She also reveals that the leader of the robbery, Brandon Bliss, didn't come to the reunion as he's on parole in Delaware. He forgives her for this and also tells her that her talents are being wasted in the precinct, encouraging her to follow her dreams.

Meanwhile, Holt (Andre Braugher) finds Terry (Terry Crews), Hitchcock (Dirk Blocker) and Scully (Joel McKinnon Miller) listening to a radio contest, where the host makes a noise and everyone tries to guess it. Holt finds this a waste of time and scoffs off, but eventually comes to join them after Terry incorrectly guesses the answer. Also, Boyle (Joe Lo Truglio) finds that Rosa (Stephanie Beatriz) has two love interests and can't decide which one to choose so he helps her choose with some unorthodox methods.

== Reception ==
=== Viewers ===
In its original American broadcast, "The Tattler" was seen by an estimated 2.75 million household viewers and gained a 0.9/4 share among adults aged 18–49, according to Nielsen Media Research. This was almost a slight decrease from the previous episode, which was watched by 2.83 million viewers with a 0.9/4 in the 18-49 demographics. This means that 0.9 percent of all households with televisions watched the episode, while 4 percent of all households watching television at that time watched it. With these ratings, Brooklyn Nine-Nine was the second highest rated show on NBC for the night, beating The Good Place and Law & Order: SVU, but behind The Titan Games, third on its timeslot and seventh for the night, behind two reruns of The Big Bang Theory, Fam, A Million Little Things, The Titan Games, and Grey's Anatomy.

=== Critical reviews ===
"The Tattler" received generally positive reviews from critics. LaToya Ferguson of The A.V. Club gave the episode a "C+" grade and wrote, "While the idea of taking the plots in this episode back to an old school simplicity is perfectly fine and could've even led to some interesting places, in execution, they just don't. Yes, 'The Tattler' (and Brooklyn Nine-Nine) can be fun without necessarily having to be productive, but this episode doesn't even reach the heights of fun in Nine-Nine that would typically excuse that."

Alan Sepinwall of Rolling Stone wrote "Jake and Gina’s 20th high school reunion is a time for introspection as well as goofiness".
