= Grateful (The Red Clay Strays album) =

Studio album by the Red Clay Strays
- Released: June 5, 2026
- Recorded: 2025–2026
- Studios: RCA Studio A, Nashville, Tennessee; Georgia Mae Studio, Savannah, Georgia
- Genres: Southern rock; Americana; country rock
- Length: 46:19
- Labels: RCA; HBYCO
- Producer: Dave Cobb

The Red Clay Strays chronology
Made by These Moments (2024)	Grateful (2026)

Singles from Grateful
- 1. "People Hatin'" Released: October 3, 2025; 2. "If I Didn't Know You" Released: February 12, 2026; 3. "Demons in Your Choir" Released: April 23, 2026

Grateful is the third studio album by the American southern rock band the Red Clay Strays. Like its predecessor, Made by These Moments, it was produced by Dave Cobb. It was released on June 5, 2026 via RCA Records and was preceded by the singles "People Hatin'", If I Didn't Know You", and "Demons in Your Choir".

== Background ==
The Red Clay Strays released their second studio album, and major label debut, Made by These Moments, on July 26, 2024. Rumors of a follow-up began emerging the following year, and were exacerbated by podcaster Joe Rogan, who claimed on his podcast that their third album would be coming in June 2026, something the band later stated that he was not supposed to reveal publicly.

The lead single from the then-unannounced album, "People Hatin'" was released on October 3, 2025. This was followed by second single "If I Didn't Know You" on February 12, 2026.

The band officially announced their third album, Grateful on April 23, 2026 alongside the release of the third single "Demons in Your Choir" and stated on Instagram, "we put a lot of love into this album and can’t wait for y’all to hear it.". They explained that the eleven track album is a collection of songs that can "spill out of dance halls on Saturday night and fill church steeples on Sunday morning in equal measure" and is a tribute to the faith they had in each other during both the ups and downs of their career so far. Of deciding to call the album Grateful, bassist Andrew Bishop noted, "the title of the album’s a literal meaning to us at this moment in our careers", while frontman Brandon Coleman explained, "Moment of Truth was a big album about having faith in dark times, looking to a higher power and Made by These Moments focused on realizing those dark times that you were having to have faith through, which made you who you are. You made it through when you didn’t think you would. And now we’re at a point where we’re grateful. Looking to God in whatever situation you’re in is a denominator in all of the albums." Coleman also described the album as a "different sounding album genre-wise" compared to the band's previous projects.

== Track listing ==
Grateful track listing
No.	Title	Writer(s)	Length
1.	"Demons in Your Choir"	Matthew Coleman; Brandon Coleman; Dakota Coleman	4:16
2.	"Don't Wanna Know"	M. Coleman; B. Coleman; Dallas Frazier	3:50
3.	"Walking Away"	M. Coleman; B. Coleman; Dave Cobb	4:46
4.	"People Hatin'"	M. Coleman; B. Coleman; John Hall; Cobb; Andrew Bishop; Zach Rishel	4:08
5.	"Revival"	M. Coleman; B. Coleman; Drew Nix	4:27
6.	"Down South"	M. Coleman; Nix	3:45
7.	"If I Didn't Know You"	Nix; Natalie Hemby	3:28
8.	"Fool's Gold"	B. Coleman; M. Coleman; Bishop; Nix; Cobb	4:49
9.	"Can't Fix You"	Nix	3:19
10.	"Do Today"	M. Coleman; Hemby	4:14
11.	"Grateful"	B. Coleman; M. Coleman; Bishop; Nix; Cobb; Ervin Drake; Jimmy Shirl	5:17
Total length:			46:19

== Personnel ==
Credits are adapted from the album's liner notes.

=== The Red Clay Strays ===
- Brandon Coleman – vocals, piano, acoustic guitar
- Drew Nix – electric guitar
- Zach Rishel – electric guitar
- Andrew Bishop – bass
- John Hall – drums
- Sevans Henderson – keyboards, piano

=== Additional contributors ===
- Dave Cobb – electric guitar, guitar, production, mixing
- Shannon Sanders – vocals
- Kellee Halford – vocals
- Olivia Jones – vocals
- Tamica Nicole – vocals
- MarQo Patton – vocals
- Tom Tapley – engineering, mixing
- Phillip Smith – additional engineering
- Ethan Barrette – engineering assistance
- Pete Lyman – mastering
- Daniel Bacigalupi – mastering assistance
- Andrew Brightman – production management
- Soundwaves Creative – art direction, design
- Macie Coleman – photography

== Charts ==
Weekly chart performance for Grateful
Chart (2026)	Peak position
Australian Country Albums (ARIA)	17
Scottish Albums (Official Charts)	50
UK Albums Sales (OCC)	57
UK Americana Albums (Official Charts)	9
UK Christian & Gospel Albums (Official Charts)	1
UK Country Albums (Official Charts)	3
US Billboard 200	39
US Americana/Folk Albums (Billboard)	3
US Top Country Albums (Billboard)	9
