= Wondering Why =

2022 single by the Red Clay Strays

Single by the Red Clay Strays

from the album Moment of Truth
- Released: March 9, 2022
- Genre: Country
- Length: 3:52
- Label: RCA
- Songwriters: Brandon Coleman; Dan Couch; Drew Nix
- Producer: The Red Clay Strays

The Red Clay Strays singles chronology
"Doin' Time" (2022)	"Wondering Why" (2022)	"Sunshine" (Western AF version) (2023)

"Wondering Why" is a song by American country music band the Red Clay Strays, released on March 9, 2022 as the second single from their debut studio album Moment of Truth (2022). A sleeper hit, it found success after going viral on the video-sharing app TikTok in late 2023 and is the band's first song to reach the Billboard Hot 100, debuting at number 93 and peaking at number 71.

== Background ==
The Red Clay Strays' guitarist Drew Nix and lead singer Brandon Coleman, along with songwriter Dan Couch, were inspired to write the song by the notion that the band's commitment to success in music had taken a toll on their romantic partners. According to Nix, "We were like, 'Our women have the short end of the stick of this. I wonder why they even like us.'"

Self-released in March 2022, "Wondering Why" began receiving wider exposure when a video of the Red Clay Strays performing a live version was posted on TikTok on September 3, 2023. The song soundtracked over 60,000 clips on TikTok by the end of 2023 and 71,000 TikTok videos in January 2024. Its popularity has also led to many singers posting their own covers of the song on the platform. In June 2024, it had amassed over 100 million streams on Spotify.

== Composition ==
Described as a "bluesy", the song depicts an unlikely romantic relationship between an upper-class woman and working-class man.

== Critical reception ==
Jessica Nicholson of Billboard gave a positive review, writing that Brandon Coleman's "gruff, impassioned vocal shines here as always, bolstered by the group's exemplary musicianship."

== Chart ==
=== Weekly charts ===
Weekly chart performance for "Wondering Why"
Chart (2023–2025)	Peak position
Canada (Canadian Hot 100)	52
Ireland (IRMA)	72
US Billboard Hot 100	71
US Hot Country Songs (Billboard)	18
US Hot Rock & Alternative Songs (Billboard)	10

=== Year-end charts ===
2024 year-end chart performance for "Wondering Why"
Chart (2024)	Position
US Hot Country Songs (Billboard)	38
US Hot Rock & Alternative Songs (Billboard)	23

== Certifications ==
Region	Certification	Certified units/sales
New Zealand (RMNZ)	2× Platinum	60,000^{‡}
United States (RIAA)	3× Platinum	3,000,000^{‡}
^{‡} Sales+streaming figures based on certification alone.
