= Wanna Be Loved =

2024 single by The Red Clay Strays

Single by The Red Clay Strays

from the album Made by These Moments
- Released: May 22, 2024
- Genre: Country rock
- Length: 3:37
- Label: RCA
- Songwriters: Dakota Coleman; Matthew Coleman
- Producer: Dave Cobb

The Red Clay Strays singles chronology
"Sunshine (Western AF Version)" (2023)	"Wanna Be Loved" (2024)	"Devil in My Ear" (2024)

Music video
- "Wanna Be Loved" on YouTube

"Wanna Be Loved" is a song by American country rock band The Red Clay Strays, released on May 22, 2024, as the lead single from their second studio album, Made by These Moments (2024). It was produced by Dave Cobb.

== Composition ==
The song contains electric guitar and an atmospheric, twangy instrumentation. In the lyrics, Brandon Coleman seeks validation and approval from his partner, dismissing the materialistic pleasures and objectives that many strive for, with a reference to "Fast Cars and Freedom" by Rascal Flatts. He asks for support from God, noting throughout the song that his reliance on faith is a means to build a successful relationship and his self-esteem. The chorus highlights his desperation, as he questions how important he is to his lover. In the second verse, Coleman rejects the idea that "faith can move a mountain" and is determined to continue his "climb", which reflects on his persistence to follow what he believes is the right path and willingness to face the challenges along the way, rather than attempting to avoid his problems. He wonders whether he is being stubborn or showing an act of faith through his dedication, and how God will judge this action. In addition, Coleman opens up about his feelings of fear and isolation, and suggests that he is growing homesick from going on tour. He explains that to feel a sense of being "home", he must find someone who loves and cares about him.

== Critical reception ==
Maxim Mower of Holler wrote that the song's instrumentation "combines ethereally with Brandon Coleman's weighty, charismatic vocals. Coleman's staggered, deliberate delivery and the layers of reverb help to give 'Wanna Be Loved' a retro, old-timey sheen, with the track storming towards a fierce, angsty climax in the outro."

== Music video ==
The music video was released alongside the single. It sees Brandon Coleman climbing through multiple tree houses. In one of them, he leans on a church-style lectern with an open Bible resting upon it.

== Charts ==
Chart performance for "Wanna Be Loved"
Chart (2024)	Peak position
New Zealand Hot Singles (RMNZ)	38
US Billboard Hot 100	100
US Hot Country Songs (Billboard)	27
US Hot Rock & Alternative Songs (Billboard)	18

== Certifications ==
Certifications
Region	Certification	Certified units/sales
New Zealand (RMNZ)	Gold	15,000^{‡}
^{‡} Sales+streaming figures based on certification alone.
