= The Red Clay Strays =

American rock band

- Origin: Mobile, Alabama, U.S.
- Genres: Southern rock; country rock
- Years active: 2016–present
- Labels: RCA Records; Thirty Tigers
- Members: Brandon Coleman; Andrew Bishop; Drew Nix; John Hall; Zach Rishel; Sevans Henderson
- Website: redclaystrays.com

The Red Clay Strays are an American country rock band formed in Mobile, Alabama, best known for their 2022 single "Wondering Why", which had success in late 2023 after going viral on TikTok. It was their first song to chart on the Billboard Hot 100, reaching No. 71.

== Career ==
=== 2016–2020: Initial formation ===
The Red Clay Strays formed as the successor to a cover band in Mobile in 2016, consisting of lead singer Brandon Coleman, bassist Andrew Bishop, and guitarist Drew Nix. As the first band began performing more original material, they regrouped and formed the Red Clay Strays, adding drummer John Hall and guitarist Zach Rishel. The group continued to perform locally in smaller venues in the southeastern United States and built up a regional following, signing with management company Ontourage Management in 2019. In November 2019, they released the single "Good Godly Woman", which was featured in the film Doctor Sleep. The singles "No Way to Know" and "Will the Lord Remember Me" followed in 2020. However, the group had to step back from touring due to COVID-19 lockdowns.

=== 2020–2023: Moment of Truth and continued growth ===
Funded primarily by crowdfunding efforts spurred by manager Cody Payne, the band recorded their debut studio album Moment of Truth in Huntsville, Alabama. The group self-released the album in April 2022 but initially had little commercial success. In 2023, they signed with WME, a talent agency, and began talks with labels. While initially wanting to remain independent, they signed with Thirty Tigers in May 2023. Performances at festivals including Lollapalooza and CMA Fest ensued. In August 2023, they released their first live EP as part of media platform Western AF's YouTube series Live AF.

=== 2023–present: Commercial breakthrough ===
Throughout 2023, the Red Clay Strays started building traction on social media, culminating in "Wondering Why" going viral on TikTok in September. "Wondering Why" was initially released in March 2022 as a single from Moment of Truth and had a boost on streaming services in late 2023 due to the Live AF performance of the song going viral. The song became the group's first song to chart on Billboard when it debuted on the Hot Rock & Alternative Songs chart at No. 33 on the November 25 chart. In December 2023, it became their first Billboard Hot 100 entry and debuted at No. 93 coinciding with their Way Too Long headlining tour, which concluded in March 2024. Also in March 2024, the group signed a record deal with RCA Records and then a global publishing deal with Warner Chappell Music in April 2024.

They added keyboardist and organist Sevans Henderson around that time. In August 2024, the group went on a five-show tour in Europe. It released its second studio album, Made by These Moments, on July 26, 2024, which was produced by Dave Cobb. The lead single from the album, "Wanna Be Loved", was released on May 22, 2024. They also appeared on the Twisters (2024) soundtrack with the song "Caddo County". On October 3, 2025, the Red Clay Strays released a single, "People Hatin'".

== Discography ==
=== Studio albums ===
List of studio albums, with selected chart positions
Title	Details	Peak chart positions							Certifications
Title	Details	US	US Am./ Folk	US Country	SCO	UK Sales	UK Country	UK C&G	Certifications
Moment of Truth	Released: April 29, 2022; Label: Self-released; Formats: Digital download, streaming, vinyl	—	11	29	78	97	4	—	RIAA: Gold
Made by These Moments	Released: July 26, 2024; Label: RCA; Formats: Digital download, streaming, CD, vinyl	29	6	9	53	48	3	—	
Grateful	Released: June 5, 2026; Label: RCA, HBYCO; Formats: Digital download, streaming, CD, vinyl	39	3	9	50	57	3	1	

=== Live albums ===
List of live albums
Title	Details	Peak chart positions
Title	Details	UK Americana
Live at the Ryman	Released: November 15, 2024; Label: RCA; Formats: Digital download, streaming	15

=== Live EPs ===
List of live EPs
Title	Details
The Red Clay Strays (Live AF Session)	Released: August 29, 2023; Label: Western AF; Formats: Digital download, streaming
The Red Clay Strays Live AF from Callaghan's	Released: January 31, 2025; Label: RCA, HBYCO; Formats: Digital download, streaming

=== Singles ===
==== As lead artist ====
List of singles, with selected chart positions, showing year released and album name
Title	Year	Peak chart positions								Certifications	Album
Title	Year	US	US AAA	US Country	US Rock	CAN	CAN Country	IRE	NZ Hot	Certifications	Album
"Good Godly Woman"	2019	—	—	—	—	—	—	—	—		Non-album singles
"No Way to Know"	2020	—	—	—	—	—	—	—	—		Non-album singles
"Will the Lord Remember Me"	2020	—	—	—	—	—	—	—	—		Non-album singles
"Doin' Time"	2022	—	—	—	—	—	—	—	—		Moment of Truth
"Wondering Why"	2022	71	4	18	10	52	—	72	—	RIAA: 3× Platinum; BPI: Silver; RMNZ: 2× Platinum	Moment of Truth
"Sunshine (Western AF Version)" (Note: The single version is the live recording while the version present on the album is the studio version.)	2023	—	—	—	—	—	—	—	—		Moment of Truth
"Wanna Be Loved"	2024	100	15	27	18	—	—	—	38	RMNZ: Gold	Made by These Moments
"Devil in My Ear"	2024	—	—	—	—	—	—	—	—		Made by These Moments
"Drowning"	2024	—	—	—	45	—	—	—	—		Made by These Moments
"People Hatin'"	2025	—	27	38	15	—	—	—	35		Grateful
"If I Didn't Know You"	2026	—	—	37	23	—	—	—	—		Grateful
"Demons in Your Choir"	2026	— (Note: "Demons in Your Choir" did not enter the Billboard Hot 100, but peaked at number 3 on the Bubbling Under Hot 100 chart.)	22	32	26	—	56	—	—		Grateful

==== As featured artist ====
List of featured singles, showing year released and album name
Title	Year	Album
"Momma Loves Me" (Needtobreathe featuring The Red Clay Strays)	2025	The Long Surrender

=== Other charted songs ===
List of other charted songs, with selected chart positions, showing year released and album name
Title	Year	Peak chart positions		Album
Title	Year	US AAA	US Rock	Album
"I'm Still Fine"	2024	30	34	Made by These Moments

=== Guest appearances ===
List of non-single guest appearances, with other performing artists, showing year released and album name
Title	Year	Other artist(s)	Album
"Caddo County"	2024	—N/a	Twisters: The Album

== Tours ==
Headlining

- Way Too Long Tour (2023–2024)
- Get Right Tour (2025)
- Grateful Tour (2026)

Opening

- Hackney Diamonds Tour (2024) (with the Rolling Stones)

== Awards and nominations ==
Year	Association	Category	Nominated work	Result	Ref.
2024	Americana Music Honors & Awards	Emerging Artist of the Year	Themselves	Won	
2024	Country Music Association Awards	Vocal Group of the Year	Themselves	Nominated	
2025	Academy of Country Music Awards	New Vocal Duo or Group of the Year	Themselves	Won	
2025	Country Music Association Awards	Vocal Group of the Year	Themselves	Won	
2026	Country Music Association Awards	Vocal Group of the Year	Themselves	Won	
