= Made by These Moments =

Studio album by the Red Clay Strays
- Released: July 26, 2024
- Length: 42:10
- Label: RCA
- Producer: Dave Cobb

The Red Clay Strays chronology
Moment of Truth (2022)	Made by These Moments (2024)	Grateful (2026)

Singles from Made by These Moments
- 1. "Wanna Be Loved" Released: May 22, 2024; 2. "Devil in My Ear" Released: June 2024; 3. "Drowning" Released: July 2024

Made by These Moments is the second studio album and major-label debut by American country rock band the Red Clay Strays. The album was released on July 26, 2024, via RCA Records. It was produced by Dave Cobb.

The album is the band's first collaboration with Cobb.

== Critical reception ==
Professional ratings
Aggregate scores
Source	Rating
Metacritic	78/100
Review scores
Source	Rating
AllMusic	3.5/5 stars
Classic Rock	3/5 stars
Country Central	8.7/10
Exclaim!	8/10
Holler Country	9/10
Mojo	4/5 stars
Rolling Stone	4/5 stars

According to the review aggregator Metacritic, Made by These Moments received "generally favorable reviews" based on a weighted average score of 78 out of 100 from 5 critic scores.

== Track listing ==
No.	Title	Writer(s)	Length
1.	"Disaster"	Matthew Coleman	4:15
2.	"Wasting Time"	Brandon Coleman; Drew Nix	3:31
3.	"Wanna Be Loved"	Dakota Coleman; M. Coleman; Dave Cobb	3:37
4.	"No One Else Like Me"	B. Coleman; M. Coleman	4:17
5.	"Ramblin'"	Cobb	2:33
6.	"Drowning"	Nix	4:48
7.	"Devil in My Ear"	Nix	3:52
8.	"I'm Still Fine"	M. Coleman	3:53
9.	"On My Knees"	Cobb; The Red Clay Strays	3:24
10.	"Moments"	Anderson East; B. Coleman; M. Coleman; Nix	4:18
11.	"God Does"	Nix	3:42
Total length:			42:10

== Personnel ==
Credits adapted from Tidal.

- Brandon Coleman – vocals, acoustic guitar, electric guitar, piano, keyboards
- Drew Nix – electric guitar, background vocals, harmonica
- Andrew Bishop – bass guitar, background vocals
- John Hall – drums
- Zach Rishel – electric guitar
- Dave Cobb – production, mixing, mastering, electric guitar, percussion, mellotron
- Mark Neill – mastering, mixing
- Lee Dyess – mastering, mixing
- Ethan Barrette – engineer

== Charts ==
Weekly chart performance for Made by These Moments
Chart (2024–2026)	Peak position
Australian Country Albums (ARIA)	13
Scottish Albums (Official Charts)	53
UK Albums Sales (OCC)	41
UK Americana Albums (Official Charts)	7
UK Country Albums (Official Charts)	3
US Billboard 200	29
US Americana/Folk Albums (Billboard)	6
US Top Country Albums (Billboard)	9
