= Beth Dover =

American actress

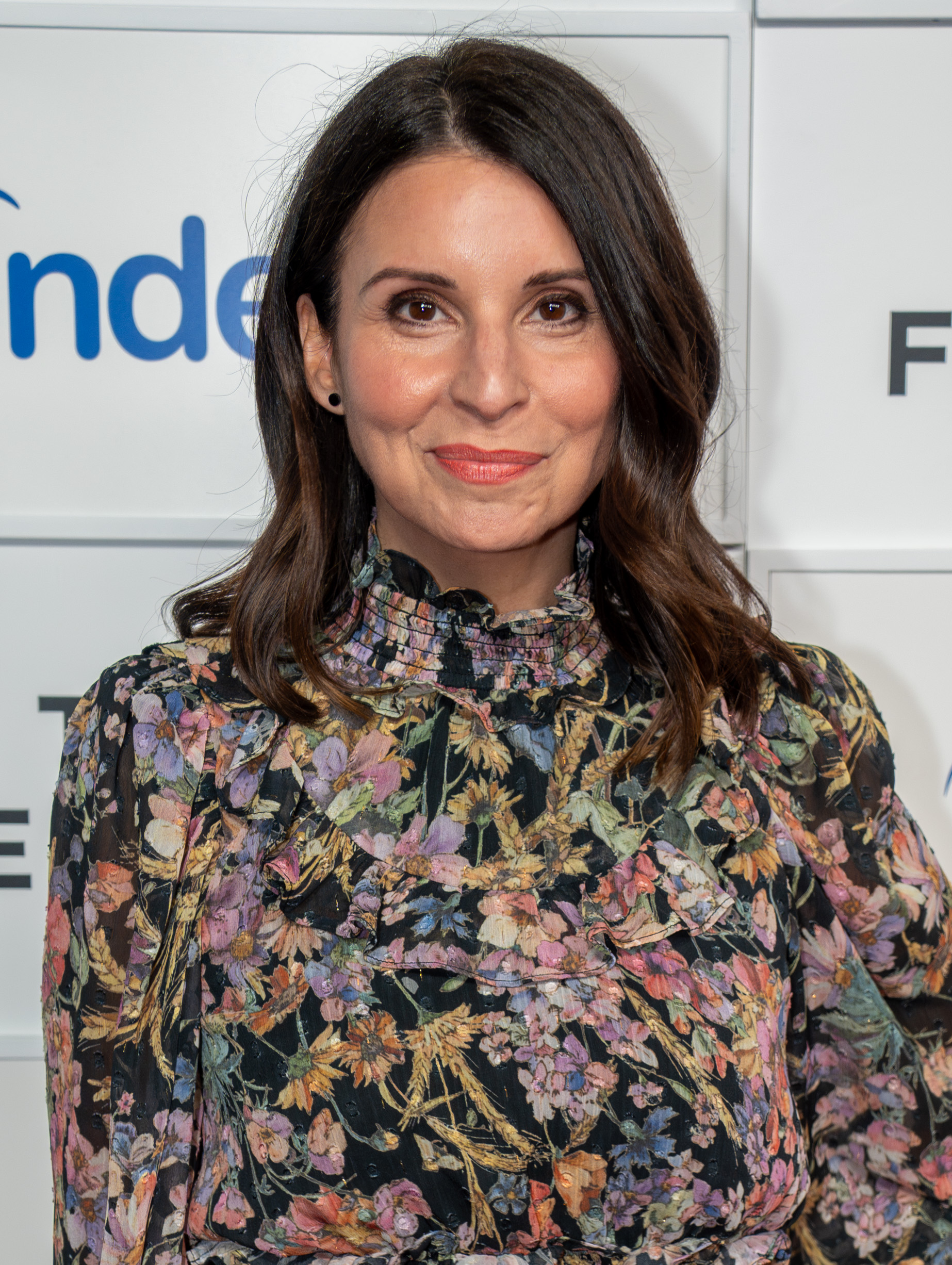
- Dover in 2025
- Born: August 29, 1978 (age 47)
- Occupation: Actress
- Years active: 1991–present
- Spouse: Joe Lo Truglio (m. 2014)
- Children: 1

External image
- Dover in 2012

Beth Dover (born August 29, 1978) is an American actress best known for her role of Linda Ferguson on the Netflix series Orange Is the New Black. She also appears in Comedy Central's Another Period and Netflix's Wet Hot American Summer: Ten Years Later.

== Career ==
Regarding her performance as Linda Ferguson in the comedy-drama series Orange Is the New Black (2015–2019), Dover describes her character as a villain or an antihero remarking, "It's really fun to play a person that lives by a different code of ethics than I do."

Dover starred as Kate in the psychological horror Outpost (2022), a film by her husband Joe Lo Truglio. Filmed in northern Idaho, it tells the story of a woman who takes a job at an outpost in the mountains to escape her abusive relationship.

== Personal life ==
Dover has been married to actor Joe Lo Truglio since April 19, 2014. They have one son, Eli, who was born in 2016.

== Filmography ==
=== Television ===
| Year | Title | Role | Notes |
|---|---|---|---|
| 1991 | Welcome Freshmen | Tandy | Episode: "The Election" |
| 1996 | Kenan & Kel | LeAnne | Episode: "Duh Bomb" |
| 2001 | Guiding Light | Fan | 1 episode |
| 2005 | LAX | Missy | Episode: "Mixed Signals" |
| 2007 | Criminal Minds | Angela Miller | Episode: "Identity" |
| 2009 | Party Down | Cramsey | Episode: "Sin Say Shun Awards Afterparty" |
| 2009 | Hot Sluts | Nikki | 5 episodes |
| 2009 | Secret Girlfriend | Confused lesbian | Episode: "You Hang with Some Lesbians" |
| 2010–2016 | Childrens Hospital | Nurse Beth / Melinda Waller | 20 episodes |
| 2010 | Big Time Rush | Amy | Episode: "Big Time Sneakers" |
| 2011 | Unleashed | Rita | 2 episodes |
| 2011 | Whitney | Madeline | Episode: "Up All Night" |
| 2012–2013 | Burning Love | Lexie | 20 episodes |
| 2013–2015 | Newsreaders | Sadee Deenus | 7 episodes |
| 2013 | You're Whole | Dr. Wendy Talmuch | Episode: "Attitude" |
| 2013 | Dads | Sarah | Episode: "The Glitch That Stole Christmas" |
| 2013 | We Are Men | Lauren | Episode: "We Are Carpe Pontiac" (unaired) |
| 2014 | Brooklyn Nine-Nine | Janice | Episode: "Fancy Brudgom" |
| 2014 | The Meltdown with Jonah and Kumail | Herself | Episode: "The One with the Betrayal" |
| 2014 | Garfunkel and Oates | Fertility nurse | Episode: "Eggs" |
| 2014–2015 | Chasing Life | Morgan | 3 episodes |
| 2015 | Comedy Bang! Bang! | Barbara Aukerman | Episode: "Jesse Tyler Ferguson Wears a Brown Checked Shirt and Stripey Socks" |
| 2015 | Fresh Off the Boat | Kim | Episode: "License to Sell" |
| 2015 | Big Time in Hollywood, FL | Rehab nurse | TV miniseries (2 episodes) |
| 2015–2018 | Another Period | Blanche | 27 episodes |
| 2015–2019 | Orange Is the New Black | Linda Ferguson | 33 episodes |
| 2015 | Wet Hot American Summer: First Day of Camp | Shari | 2 episodes |
| 2015 | Difficult People | Kathy | Episode: "Library Water" |
| 2015 | Truth Be Told | Devorah Goldman | 2 episodes |
| 2016 | New Girl | Cynthia | Episode: "Bob & Carol & Nick & Schmidt" |
| 2016 | Dice | Andrew Dice Clay's ex-girlfriend | Episode: "Ego" |
| 2016 | Son of Zorn | Bridget | Episode: "A Tale of Two Zorns" |
| 2016, 2020 | Bob's Burgers | Caitlin / Annie | Voice role; 2 episodes |
| 2017 | @midnight | Herself | Episode #4.119 |
| 2017 | Wet Hot American Summer: Ten Years Later | Shari | 3 episodes |
| 2017 | Adam Ruins Everything | Jersey Shore-acle | Episode: "Adam Ruins Halloween" |
| 2017 | Do You Want to See a Dead Body? | Beth | Episode: "A Body and an Actor" |
| 2018 | Swedish Dicks | Janane Love-Jones | Episode: "Till Dicks Do Us Part" |
| 2018 | Rob Riggle's Ski Master Academy | C.A.R.O.L. / Goody | 2 episodes |
| 2019 | American Housewife | Ms. Belt | Episode: "American Idol" |
| 2019 | Spirit Riding Free | Judge | Voice role; Episode: "Lucky and the Dressage Sabotage" |
| 2020 | Medical Police | Nurse Beth | 3 episodes |
| 2021 | Tacoma FD | CeeCee | Episode: "Eddie's Exes" |
| 2024 | Nobody Wants This | Talia | Episode: "WAGS" |

=== Film ===
| Year | Title | Role | Notes |
|---|---|---|---|
| 2002 | G | Nancy | |
| 2004 | The Specs | Bar girl | Short film |
| 2005 | The Accident | Jessi | Short film |
| 2005 | Darcy's Off-White Wedding | Assistant | Short film |
| 2006 | Dr. Miracles | Detective Miller | Short film |
| 2007 | The Ten | Sheila Contiella | |
| 2007 | The Shadows | Executive | |
| 2014 | Leonard in Slow Motion | Sheryl | Short film |
| 2014 | Life Partners | Jenn | |
| 2014 | The All-Nighters | Porch girl | Short film |
| 2018 | Little Bitches | Kelly's mother | Uncredited |
| 2018 | The Oath | Kerry Nance | |
| 2021 | Good on Paper | Leslie | |
| 2022 | Scrap | Esther | |
| 2022 | Outpost | Kate | |
| 2023 | The Donor Party | Joyce | |
| 2023 | Helen's Dead | Molly | |
| 2025 | The Napa Boys | Trixie | |
| 2026 | Gail Daughtry and the Celebrity Sex Pass | Helena Bonham Carter | |

=== Web ===
| Year | Title | Role | Notes |
|---|---|---|---|
| 2007 | Wainy Days | Beth | Web series (Episode: "Plugged") |
| 2011 | A Guy Walks Into a Bar | Girl | Web series (Episode: "Rub Daily") |
| 2012 | Some Study That I Used to Know | Teacher | Short film (CollegeHumor Original) |
| 2012 | Batman Blows His Cover | Rachel | Short film (CollegeHumor Original) |
| 2012 | Ringo Wants to Sing More | Teacher | Short film (CollegeHumor Original) |
| 2013 | Batman: The Outtakes | Rachel | Short film (CollegeHumor Original) |
| 2014 | Next Time on Lonny | Gina | Web series (Episode: "The End of Lonny") |
| 2017 | Kevin Pollak's Chat Show | Herself | Guest (1 episode) |
| 2025 | Middle Aged Dad Jam Band | Herself, vocals | YouTube channel (Episode: "Ride Like the Wind (Christopher Cross") |
