= The Terrors of Jordan Mendoza =

- Genre: Comedy horror
- Created by: Jordan Mendoza
- Starring: Jordan Mendoza
- Composer: Christopher Bear
- Country of origin: United States
- Original language: English
- No. of seasons: 1
- No. of episodes: 10

Production
- Executive producers: Jordan Mendoza; David Martin; Jonathan Stern; Aaron Brown
- Producer: Emma Ferreira
- Running time: 11 minutes
- Production companies: Avalon Television; Abominable Pictures; Sasa Pictures; Williams Street

Original release
- Network: Adult Swim
- Release: September 13, 2026 – present

The Terrors of Jordan Mendoza is an American comedy horror television series created by and starring Jordan Mendoza. The series premiered on Adult Swim on September 13, 2026. It follows a fictionalized version of Mendoza as he experiences a series of absurd and frightening dreamscapes. The series combines sketch comedy with elements of surreal horror.

The series was produced for Adult Swim by Avalon Television. Mendoza directs, stars in, executive produces, and writes the series with David Machajewski. Aaron Brown, David Martin and Jonathan Stern also serve as executive producers, while Jim Fagan and David Machajewski are co-executive producers and Emma Ferreira is a producer. Christopher Bear composed the original music.

== Premise ==
The series follows Jordan Mendoza as he navigates a succession of bizarre dreams and nightmares. The sketches use the logic of dreams to place Mendoza in surreal, frightening and comedic situations. Mendoza has said that some of the ideas in the series originated from his own dreams.

== Cast ==
- Jordan Mendoza as himself
- Steve Buscemi as himself / Lt. McMurphy / The Devil
- Marc Maron as Marc Maron Clone
- Fred Armisen
- Gregg Turkington as Principal Jeffers
- Mark Proksch as Mark Thompson
- Wanda Sykes as herself
- Thomas Lennon as Dr. Hanley
- Clea DuVall
- Lake Bell
- Mike Mitchell
- Martha Kelly as Erin / Claire
- Kate Berlant as Riley
- Fred Melamed as Judge Hamilton / Dr. Thomas
- Toby Huss
- Randall Park
- Rob Huebel as Bathroom Patron
- Tom Scharpling
- Chris Parnell as Wedding Speaker
- Haley Joel Osment as Brady the Leprechaun
- Milana Vayntrub
- Eva Victor as Colleen
- Adam Godley
- Kimiko Glenn as Asher's Mother
- Weyes Blood
- Teezo Touchdown
- Lauren Tom as Sandra

Avalon announced the guest cast in October 2025, listing the performers appearing throughout the series.

== Episodes ==
No.	Title	Directed by	Written by	Original release date	US viewers (millions)
1	"Had This Crazy Dream"	Jordan Mendoza	Jordan Mendoza	September 13, 2026	N/A
2	"This Idiot Is Freaking Out"	Jordan Mendoza	Jordan Mendoza and David Machajewski	September 20, 2026	N/A
Segments: "The Letter"
3	"Sometimes I Feel Haunted."	Jordan Mendoza	Jordan Mendoza and David Machajewski	September 27, 2026	N/A
Segments: "The Hospital"
4	"Found a Leprechaun"	Jordan Mendoza	Jordan Mendoza and David Machajewski	October 4, 2026	N/A
Segments: "Small Talk"
5	"I Gotta Relax."	Jordan Mendoza	Jordan Mendoza and David Machajewski	October 11, 2026	N/A
Segments: "Massage"
6	"Finally Got a Good Therapist."	Jordan Mendoza	Jordan Mendoza and David Machajewski	October 18, 2026	N/A
7	"Really Interesting"	Jordan Mendoza	Jordan Mendoza and David Machajewski	October 25, 2026	TBD
Segments: "The Dark Knight Browses"
8	"Oh, Whoa"	Jordan Mendoza	Jordan Mendoza and David Machajewski	November 1, 2026	TBD
Segments: "Sub Shop Spokesman"
9	"I Think We Should Be Buds"	Jordan Mendoza	Jordan Mendoza and David Machajewski	November 8, 2026	TBD
Segments: "Scary Drawings"
10	"What Was I Gonna Say?"	Jordan Mendoza	Jordan Mendoza and David Machajewski	November 15, 2026	TBD
11	"Wow, I Hope That Doesn't Happen to Me"	TBA	TBA	November 22, 2026	TBD
12	"Death"	TBA	TBA	November 29, 2026	TBD
13	"I'm In Love!"	TBA	TBA	December 6, 2026	TBD

== Production ==
=== Development ===
In August 2025, Adult Swim ordered The Terrors of Jordan Mendoza as a live-action quarter-hour sketch comedy series created by and starring Jordan Mendoza. The series was announced as a production of Avalon for Adult Swim.

Mendoza serves as the series' director, lead performer, and executive producer. He writes the show with David Machajewski. Aaron Brown, David Martin and Jonathan Stern also serve as executive producers. Jim Fagan and David Machajewski serve as co-executive producers, Emma Ferreira as producer, and Christopher Bear as composer.

The series draws on Mendoza's dreams and nightmares. In a September 2026 review, Los Angeles Times television critic Robert Lloyd reported that Mendoza had said some of the show's ideas came from actual dreams. Lloyd characterized the program as a sketch show structured around dream logic and surreal situations.

The series was presented by Avalon at MIPCOM in October 2025, when the company announced its guest cast. Avalon also stated that it would distribute the series internationally.

=== Music ===
Christopher Bear composed the original music for the series. Bear's involvement was reported in September 2026 in connection with the series' premiere.

== Release ==
Adult Swim announced in August 2026 that The Terrors of Jordan Mendoza would premiere on September 13, 2026, at midnight Eastern and Pacific Time. The first season consists of 13 episodes, with episodes scheduled to air weekly.
