= Jonathan Stern =

American film producer

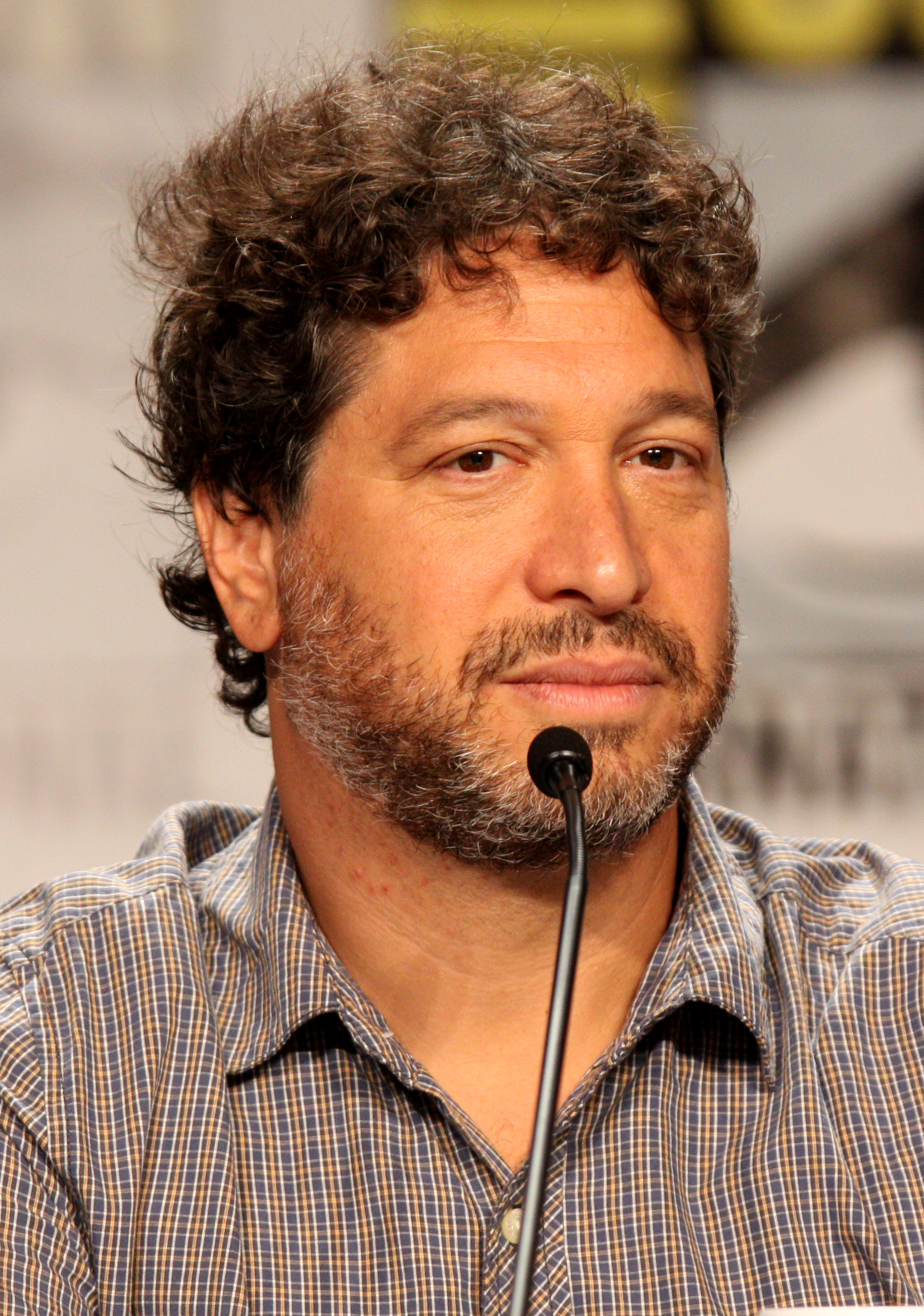
Stern at the 2011 San Diego Comic-Con.

Jonathan Stern is the founder of Abominable Pictures, a creator-driven comedy production company that develops and produces content for television, web and film.

He is the three-time Emmy Award-winning Executive Producer of the television comedies Childrens Hospital, Medical Police, Wet Hot American Summer: First Day of Camp, Wet Hot American Summer: Ten Years Later, Brews Brothers, NTSF:SD:SUV::, You’re Whole, and Newsreaders, Mystery Science Theater 3000, Do You Want to See a Dead Body?, Rob Riggle's Ski Master Academy, Shrink, and Garfunkel & Oates.

In digital, Stern executive produced Yahoo's Burning Love, Wainy Days, Horrible People, Beef, The Hotwives of Las Vegas and The Hotwives of Orlando on Hulu.

He has produced numerous feature films including A Futile and Stupid Gesture, Oxygen, Mexico City, Scotland, PA, The Vagina Monologues, Confess, Diggers, and David Wain’s The Ten. Other past projects include producing the pilot of Louie on FX and directing Stella: Live in Boston.

Stern attended NYU’s Tisch School of the Arts, and graduated in the class of ‘89 with a BFA from the Kanbar Film & TV Program.

In 2015, Jonathan Stern was listed on VideoInk’s 30 Digital Creatives To Know.
