= Garfunkel and Oates (TV series) =

- Genre: Comedy; Musical
- Created by: Riki Lindhome; Kate Micucci
- Directed by: Fred Savage
- Starring: Riki Lindhome; Kate Micucci
- Opening theme: "Wow" by Garfunkel and Oates
- Country of origin: United States
- Original language: English
- No. of seasons: 1
- No. of episodes: 8

Production
- Executive producers: Riki Lindhome; Kate Micucci; Fred Savage; Jonathan Stern; Dennis McNicholas
- Camera setup: Single camera
- Running time: 22 minutes
- Production companies: Hair And Moustache; Abominable Pictures; IFC Original Production

Original release
- Network: IFC
- Release: August 7 – September 25, 2014

Garfunkel and Oates is an American comedy television series created by and starring Riki Lindhome and Kate Micucci, members of the titular musical duo. The series aired from August 7 through September 25, 2014, on IFC. On March 3, 2015, IFC decided not to renew the series for a second season.

== Plot ==
The series follows the personal and professional lives of the comedy folk duo Riki "Garfunkel" Lindhome and Kate "Oates" Micucci, as they attempt to make it big in Hollywood one satirical song at a time.

== Cast ==
- Riki Lindhome as Riki "Garfunkel" Lindhome
- Kate Micucci as Kate "Oates" Micucci

=== Recurring ===
- Natasha Leggero as Vivian St. Charles
- Busy Philipps as Karen
- Sarah Burns as Cheryl Johnson
- Artemis Pebdani as Leora / Janice

=== Guest ===
- Steve Agee as Toy Store Cashier
- Geoffrey Arend as Todd
- Kyle Dunnigan as Josh Duncan
- Rob Huebel as Boomer
- Anthony Jeselnik as Thomas
- Ben Kingsley as himself
- Sugar Lyn Beard as Epiphany
- Abby Elliott as Chevrolet
- Chris Hardwick as himself
- Karen Maruyama as Susie
- Tig Notaro as Pumpernickel Place Producer
- John Oates as Dirty D
- Chris Parnell as Stan
- Lance Barber as Drew
- Ashley Johnson as Jane
- Joel Michaely as Marcus
- T. J. Miller as Matthew
- Noureen DeWulf as Jennifer
- Toby Huss as Tom
- Steve Little as Dennis
- Kevin Pollak as Andrew
- Kulap Vilaysack as Laura
- Rose Abdoo as Magda
- Ike Barinholtz as Director
- Erin Cahill as Jenny
- Eugene Cordero as Fred
- Jonah Ray as Charlie
- Janina Gavankar as Dr. Sharma
- Moshe Kasher as Receptionist
- Dannah Phirman as Meditation Voice
- "Weird Al" Yankovic as himself
- Ari Graynor as Cornish
- B. K. Cannon as Becky
- Beth Dover as Fertility Nurse
- Trevor Einhorn as Graham
- Rich Fulcher as Dr. Patel
- Jimmy Bennett as Braden
- Creed Bratton as Kazoo Man
- Jason Ritter as Jason

== Development and production ==
On January 13, 2011, Garfunkel and Oates signed a deal with HBO for a pilot for a series loosely based on their lives. Lindhome has described it as "Glee with dick jokes". Shortly afterward, HBO passed on the series. In August 2012, HBO posted webisodes on their website.

On April 10, 2013, IFC ordered their own pilot for Garfunkel and Oates, as part of the scripted development slate. On September 30, 2013, IFC officially placed an eight-episode series order on the series, executive produced by Jonathan Stern and Abominable Pictures. A few months later, Fred Savage signed on to executive produce and direct all season one episodes.

On June 2, 2014, IFC announced the series premiere date of August 7, 2014, at 10 pm ET/PT. IFC released the third episode online a week before the series premiere.

On March 3, 2015, IFC announced that the series was canceled after one season. In an interview, Riki Lindhome stated that the network "wanted to do another season but they needed it out by a certain date", which Lindhome could not meet due to commitments for another show on Comedy Central.

== Episodes ==
No.	Title	Directed by	Written by	Original release date	US viewers (millions)
1	"The Fadeaway"	Fred Savage	Riki Lindhome & Courtney Bowman	August 7, 2014	0.199
Stand-up comedians and comedy-music duo Garfunkel and Oates (Kate Micucci and Riki Lindhome) are living in Los Angeles. Riki begins dating a fellow comedian after her boyfriend breaks up with her, believing their recent song was mocking his testicles. Kate gets a call from their agent to audition for an upcoming Ben Kingsley film. When she messes up and calls her agent, she discovers the role was meant for Riki. Meanwhile, Riki decides to break up with her boyfriend, after his stand-up act focuses on their awkward sex.
2	"Rule 34"	Fred Savage	Dennis McNicholas	August 14, 2014	0.205
Riki and Kate discover they are the subject of a porn parody, "Garfinger and Butts". The two girls who starred in this are fans and wish to emulate them. After Chris Hardwick tweets about a song of Garfinger and Butts, the two become bigger than Garfunkel and Oates. The two groups then both get an offer to write a song for Pumpernickel Place (a parody of Sesame Street) about the wedding of Schubert and Sockley (a parody of Bert and Ernie). John Oates plays the bit character Dirty D. The episode ends with Riki and Kate getting an offer to open for Garfinger and Butts.
3	"Speechless"	Fred Savage	Riki Lindhome & Kate Micucci	August 21, 2014	0.103
After their friend starts dating a girl who barely talks, Kate and Riki experiment to see what will happen if they don't talk at all on a blind date. To their surprise, their dates become invested in them, and the two decide to continue these relationships. Riki's new boyfriend makes assumptions about her past due to her not talking, and she finally talks during a football game, with him liking her even more. Unfortunately, he ends it when he discovers many Garfunkel and Oates songs are about their ex-boyfriends' penises. Kate has to break up with her new boyfriend when she finds out he is dating her because he believes she is autistic, as he is into mentally handicapped women.
4	"Road Warriors"	Fred Savage	Jonathan Stern	August 28, 2014	0.206
Riki and Kate go to a show outside the city, where they find a man who has been protesting them for some time in order to discourage female comedians. Riki and Kate encounter several problems with the show when their sound guy quits and the bar owner wants to propose to his girlfriend in the middle of the show. The show ends up going horribly, as the sound guy remains defiant and the owner's girlfriend turns him down after hearing a Garfunkel and Oates song about how miserable life is in one's thirties. Riki and Kate are forced to get a ride back home with their protester.
5	"Hair Swap"	Fred Savage	Dennis McNicholas	September 4, 2014	0.145
Wondering if blondes are hotter in the eyes of men and if brunettes are treated nicer by women, Kate and Riki buy wigs of opposite colors to test their theory. Their hypothesis is proven true when Riki finds their friends treating her much better than usual, and Kate easily picks up a guy at a bar. They end up having to ditch the wigs when Riki is treated worse by the director of the film she is in, and when Kate falls asleep during sex with her one night stand. They surmise at the end that they have learned nothing from this experience.
6	"Third Member"	Fred Savage	Jason Sudeikis & Hanna Christian	September 11, 2014	0.130
While trying to get licenses to legally purchase marijuana, the former third member of Garfunkel and Oates, Jazzy Jeff (now a celebrity known as Cornish), wishes to get revenge on the two for kicking her out of the band, using her celebrity fame and fortune to torture the two. After several hijinks, Cornish's final piece of revenge is buying out all of their next concert tickets to stop anyone from going to the show, and buying all their merchandise to leave none for their fans. This makes Riki and Kate ecstatic, as her revenge has ended up giving them plenty of money.
7	"Eggs"	Fred Savage	Riki Lindhome	September 18, 2014	0.136
Finding out she has little time to give birth before her reproductive system begins failing, Riki begins the process of hormone injections. Also, after meeting a massage therapist, Kate worries she may have Peter Pan Syndrome, meaning she is afraid to grow up. She begins keeping a fear journal, and gives away all of her handmade puppets to separate herself from her childhood. Riki ends up messing up a show for them due to her hormones, and the episode ends on a cliffhanger.
8	"Maturity"	Fred Savage	Riki Lindhome	September 25, 2014	0.088
Riki begins dating her ex, and Kate begins dating a high schooler, hoping he will be on her own level of maturity. This is all happening while Kate is organizing a "kazoo parade," where she gets several people to march down the street while playing the kazoo. Riki ends up getting along marvelously with her ex, but when he discovers she is using hormones to freeze her eggs, he gives her an ultimatum: have kids with him now, or they break up. She chooses to continue her medical procedures, and he ends their relationship. Meanwhile, Kate's boyfriend breaks up with her, as her sexual experience is not enough for him. The next day, Riki's results her in, and none of her eggs are viable, which means she likely won't be able to have children, though she tells their friend Vivian she still wishes to one day have kids. At Kate's kazoo parade, she finds out that the men who attended to join her are perverts, as in internet slang, a "kazoo parade" is when a woman gives a blowjob to several flaccid dicks. Riki finds Kate sitting alone in the park, and suggests they put on the kazoo parade, just the two of them, saying it will allow the reliving of it one last time before finally moving on with their lives. The two do the parade, and the series ends with Riki and Kate sitting together in their apartment. Kate gives a happy ending to her fear journal about growing up, and gives it to Riki for her future child, assuring her that she will have kids one day.

== Reception ==
The series received mostly positive reviews from television critics. On Metacritic, the first season was given a rating of 73 out of 100, indicating "generally favorable reviews". Rob Owen of the Pittsburgh Post-Gazette described the series as "a gem of a little show." Writing for the Los Angeles Times, Robert Lloyd noted that the first episode "is the weakest of the three I've seen," but "Things quickly improve, however, as the women get stranger and more idiosyncratic." Caroline Framke of The A.V. Club awarded the series with a "B−" grade, stating that the series was "promising" but also "struggling to find itself". She also picked up on the comparisons to Flight of the Conchords, noting that "both shows feature hapless heroes and smash cuts to surrealist musical interruptions. While Flight of the Conchords took pride in maintaining a quizzical distance from the audience, Garfunkel and Oates tries to bring us right into Lindhome and Micucci's world alongside them." Mike Hale of The New York Times compared the series to The Mary Tyler Moore Show, stating that "the Mary Tyler Moore connection is clear, and the desirable Riki and second banana Kate have a slight Mary-Rhoda correlation."
