= Newsreaders =

Television series

- Genre: Comedy; Parody; Satire; Black comedy
- Created by: Rob Corddry; Jonathan Stern; David Wain
- Starring: Mather Zickel; Dannah Phirman; Kumail Nanjiani; Beth Dover; Ray Wise
- Country of origin: United States
- Original language: English
- No. of seasons: 2
- No. of episodes: 24

Production
- Executive producers: Jim Margolis; Rob Corddry; Jonathan Stern; David Wain
- Camera setup: Single camera
- Running time: 11 minutes
- Production companies: The Corddry Company; Abominable Pictures; Warner Bros. Studio 2.0; Warner Bros. Television; Williams Street

Original release
- Network: Adult Swim
- Release: January 17, 2013 – February 13, 2015

Related
- Childrens Hospital

Newsreaders is an American television comedy that aired on Cartoon Network's late night programming block Adult Swim. Newsreaders is a spin-off of Childrens Hospital, presented as the fictional television news magazine program Newsreaders. The series premiered January 17, 2013 and ended on February 13, 2015, with a total of 24 episodes over the course of two seasons.

== Cast ==
=== Hosts ===
- Mather Zickel as Louis LaFonda (season 1)
- Alan Tudyk as Reagan Biscayne (season 2)

=== Correspondents ===
- Dannah Phirman as Narge Hemingway
- Beth Dover as Sadee Deenus
- Alison Becker as Xandra Dent
- Kumail Nanjiani as Amir Larussa
- Randall Park as Clavis Kim (season 2)

=== Commentator ===
- Ray Wise as Skip Reming
- David Wain as Jim Davidson (season 2)

== Episodes ==
=== Series overview ===
Season	Episodes	Originally aired	
Season	Episodes	First aired	Last aired
1	10	January 17, 2013	March 21, 2013
2	14	October 23, 2014	February 13, 2015

=== Season 1 (2013) ===
No. overall	No. in season	Title	Directed by	Written by	Original release date	Prod. code	US viewers (millions)
1	1	"Auto Erotic"	Jim Margolis	Jim Margolis	January 17, 2013	104	1.51
Guest stars: Missi Pyle, Brian Posehn, Aaron Staton, Dan Rather
2	2	"Hedge Fun"	Jim Margolis	Rachel Axler	January 24, 2013	109	1.59
Guest stars: Brandon Routh, Lizzy Caplan, Dan Rather, Warren G
3	3	"Hair Razing"	Rhys Thomas	Jim Margolis	January 31, 2013	102	1.61
Guest stars: Dan Bakkedahl, Deanna Russo, Andrea Savage, Malin Åkerman, Lake Bell, Henry Winkler
4	4	"CCSI/Boston"	Joe Burke; Rhys Thomas	Paul Scheer; Rob Corddry & Jason Reich	February 7, 2013	107	1.53
Guest stars: Katie Aselton, Garret Dillahunt, Patrick Fischler, Dennis Haysbert, Kerri Kenney, Joey McIntyre, Dan Rather
5	5	"Gay Camp"	Osmany Rodriguez & Matt Villines	Michael Showalter	February 14, 2013	108	1.61
6	6	"Fit Town, Fat Town"	Joe Burke	Jim Margolis	February 21, 2013	103	1.66
Guest stars: Reid Ewing, Toby Huss, Thomas Lennon, Mary Lynn Rajskub, Dan Rather
7	7	"Unborn Again"	Joe Burke	Jim Margolis	February 28, 2013	105	1.45
Guest stars: Ed Begley Jr., Josh Meyers, Jane Seymour
8	8	"31-Up"	Rhys Thomas	Jonathan Stern	March 7, 2013	106	1.60
Guest stars: Dave Foley, Keir Gilchrist, Rachael Harris
9	9	"Epic Fail"	Osmany Rodriguez & Matt Villines	Rob Corddry & Jason Reich; John Aboud & Michael Colton	March 14, 2013	101	1.60
Skip Reming reports on airport security after 9/11, and Xandra Dent investigates the real intentions of hospital machines. Guest star: Neil Flynn
10	10	"Jr. Newsreaders"	Osmany Rodriguez & Matt Villines	Wyatt Cenac	March 21, 2013	110	1.49
Guest Stars: Bob Clendenin, Piper Mackenzie Harris, Conan O'Brien, Kate Walsh

=== Season 2 (2014–15) ===
Guest appearances in season two include Randall Park (as correspondent Clavis Kim), Billy Ray Cyrus, Malin Åkerman, Rob Huebel (as fictional Childrens Hospital star Rob Heubel), Rob Riggle, Martin Starr, James Urbaniak, Tom Lennon, Danny Pudi, Scott Adsit, Jenna Fischer, Mel Cowan, Ryan Hansen, Marc Evan Jackson, Steve Little, Harold Perrineau, the Sklar Brothers, David Wain, and David Hasselhoff.

No. overall	No. in season	Title	Directed by	Written by	Original release date
11	1	"F-Dancing, Are You Decent?"	Alex Fernie and Jim Margolis	Kevin Kataoka and Jim Margolis	October 23, 2014
Amir LaRussa looks at a new dance trend that has school officials threatening to cancel the prom. And are you a racist? Clavis Kim answers that question. Guest star: David Hasselhoff
12	2	"Motorboating Dads; The Negative $100,000 Question"	Alex Fernie and Paul Scheer	Sam Sklaver and Tim Neenan	October 30, 2014
Sadee Deenus looks at a controversial new parenting trend and Reagan Biscayne exposes the dirty secrets of television game shows. Guest stars: Marc Evan Jackson; Rob Huebel; David Krumholtz; Jay Thomas
13	3	"The Journey of an iPhone; Restaurant Plague"	Alex Fernie and Jim Margolis	Rob Corddry and Kevin Kataoka	November 6, 2014
Xandra Dent traces the path the iPhone takes from mines to your pocket and Amir LaRussa reports on a hot new kind of theme restaurant. Guest stars: Matthew Atkinson; Jerry Minor; Tim de Zarn
14	4	"Roswell, New Mexico; Skip Goes to a Wedding"	Alex Fernie and Jim Margolis	Tim Neenan and Sam Sklaver	November 20, 2014
Sadee Deenus travels to the alien capital of the world and finds some surprises. Skip Reming goes to a wedding and also finds some surprises. Guest stars: John Ross Bowie; Brian Huskey; Seth Morris
15	5	"Headless Football Player; Identity Thief"	Alex Fernie and Paul Scheer	Jim Margolis and William Savage	November 27, 2014
Reagan Biscayne profiles a young athlete who overcame a rare disability to realize his dream, and Sadee Deenus meets an identity thief with a thick Russian accent and a huge problem. Guest stars: Craig Cackowski; Jon Daly
16	6	"Go Nadz; Talkin' News"	Alex Fernie and Jim Margolis	Sam Sklaver	December 4, 2014
Narge Hemingway investigates a controversy in the competitive world of car genitalia. Skip Reming and Rob Riggle chat with Childrens Hospitals' Ingrid Hagerstown. Guest stars: Rob Riggle; Malin Åkerman; Dave Holmes
17	7	"Strip Club Exposé; Long Lost Twins"	Alex Fernie and Jim Margolis	Jon Stern and Rob Corddry & Jim Margolis	December 11, 2014
The news crew go undercover to reveal the truth and lies inside a strip club. Also, lifelong friends discover they're twins who were separated at birth. Guest stars: Diora Baird; Jason Sklar; Randy Sklar
18	8	"America's Unknown President; Reporter on House Arrest"	Alex Fernie and Jim Margolis	Michael Showalter and Rob Corddry	December 18, 2014
Reagan Biscayne looks at a new documentary about an American President forgotten by the history books. Also, what happens when a Newsreaders reporter can't leave her house? Guest stars: Thomas Lennon; Billy Ray Cyrus; Martin Starr; Liz Cackowski
19	9	"A Billionaire Goes to Hell; Sitcom Family"	Alex Fernie and David Wain	Kevin Kataoka & Tim Neenan and Rachel Axler	January 9, 2015
Take a look at billionaire adventurer Reese Ballard's latest improbable quest and then go behind the scenes with America's favorite sitcom family, "The Jordans." Guest stars: Ryan Hansen; Michael McDonald
20	10	"Band Names-R-Us; Put Me in Coach"	Jim Margolis and Paul Scheer	Rob Corddry & Jim Margolis and Sam Sklaver	January 16, 2015
Clavis Kim explores the lucrative world of coming up with names for rock bands. Sadee Deenus profiles a football coach who is revolutionizing his sport. Guest stars: David Hasselhoff; Ian Roberts; Howard Kremer; Armen Weitzman
21	11	"How the Sausage Is Made; Lottery Winners Lose"	Alex Fernie and Paul Scheer	William Savage and Lauren Caltagirone	January 23, 2015
Xandra Dent explores a company that is revolutionizing how sausage is made and Reagan Biscayne meets a lottery winner who makes him really, really angry. Guest stars: Danny Pudi; Kurt Braunohler; Steve Little
22	12	"Jellyfish Sting Clinic; David Hasselhoff"	Jim Margolis	Rob Corddry and Jim Margolis	January 30, 2015
In a Newsreaders exclusive, Amir LaRussa meets a doctor who is employing unorthodox methods to treat jellyfish stings and bites. Also, David Hasslehoff tells salacious tales from the set of Knight Rider. Guest stars: David Hasselhoff; Rhys Darby
23	13	"The FMK Killer; Newsreaders: Behind the Scenes"	Alex Fernie and Paul Scheer	Tim Neenan and Sam Sklaver	February 6, 2015
The first-ever interview with a controversial serial killer and the FBI agents who caught him. Also, a behind-the-scenes look at how popular newsmagazine Newsreaders is made. Guest stars: James Urbaniak; Jenna Fischer; Scott Adsit
24	14	"Creepiest Man Alive, Bomb Sniffing Dogs"	Alex Fernie and Paul Scheer	Tim Neenan and Matt Kriete & Andrew Fleming	February 13, 2015
A behind-the-scenes look at how People of Interest magazine puts together the "Creepiest Man Alive" issue. Also, how dogs are keeping Americans safe. Guest stars: Dan Bakkedahl, Timm Sharp
