= NTSF:SD:SUV:: =

American television comedy

- Also known as: National Terrorism Strike Force: San Diego: Sport Utility Vehicle
- Genre: Parody; Satire; Black comedy
- Created by: Paul Scheer
- Directed by: Eric Appel
- Starring: Paul Scheer; June Diane Raphael; Brandon Johnson; Kate Mulgrew; Rebecca Romijn; Martin Starr; Karen Gillan; Rob Riggle; Peter Serafinowicz
- Theme music composer: Jack Dolgen
- Composers: Dan Marocco; Matt Novack
- Country of origin: United States
- Original language: English
- No. of seasons: 3
- No. of episodes: 39

Production
- Executive producers: Paul Scheer; Jonathan Stern; Curtis Gwinn
- Cinematography: Marco Fargnoli
- Running time: 11 minutes (with the exception of "U-KO'ed" which is 22 minutes)
- Production companies: 2nd Man on the Moon; Abominable Pictures; Williams Street

Original release
- Network: Adult Swim
- Release: July 22, 2011 – December 13, 2013

NTSF:SD:SUV:: (also known as National Terrorism Strike Force: San Diego: Sport Utility Vehicle::) is an American black comedy television series created by Paul Scheer for Adult Swim. It parodies the police procedural and action film genres. The series starred Paul Scheer, June Diane Raphael, Brandon Johnson, Kate Mulgrew, Rebecca Romijn, Martin Starr, Karen Gillan, Rob Riggle, and Peter Serafinowicz. NTSF:SD:SUV:: aired three seasons from July 22, 2011 to December 13, 2013. A number of special episodes were included within the broadcast of the series. In a 2014 interview, Scheer stated that the show is on an indefinite hiatus, with no immediate plans for a return.

== Cast ==
Actor	Role	Notes
Paul Scheer	Trent Hauser	
June Diane Raphael	Piper Ferguson	
Brandon Johnson	Alphonse Bearwalker	
Kate Mulgrew	Kove	
Rebecca Romijn	Jessie Nichols	Seasons 1–2
Martin Starr	Sam Stern	
Karen Gillan	Daisy	Season 3
Rob Riggle	The President of the Navy	
Peter Serafinowicz	the voice of S.A.M.	

== Production ==
Created by comedian Paul Scheer, NTSF:SD:SUV:: (National Terrorism Strike Force: San Diego: Sport Utility Vehicle::) was first featured in a set of mock promotional television advertisements shot as a backdoor pilot and aired during season one broadcasts of Childrens Hospital on Adult Swim. The mock promos starred Scheer as agent Trent Hauser, along with June Diane Raphael, Brandon Johnson, and Rob Riggle. From the mock promos, the program was ordered to series with a 12-episode season, adding Kate Mulgrew, Rebecca Romijn, and Martin Starr to the cast. NTSF:SD:SUV:: premiered on July 21, 2011. The series has aired three seasons, with the third concluding in 2013. In a 2014 interview, Scheer stated that the show is on an indefinite hiatus, with no immediate plans for a return.

== Episodes ==
Season	Episodes	Originally released	
Season	Episodes	First released	Last released
1	12	July 22, 2011	October 7, 2011
2	15	August 10, 2012	June 13, 2013
3	12	July 26, 2013	December 13, 2013

=== Season 1 (2011) ===
No. overall	No. in season	Title	Directed by	Written by	Original release date	Prod. code	U.S. viewers (millions)
1	1	"One Cabeza, Two Cabeza, Three Cabeza...DEAD!"	Eric Appel	Paul Scheer	July 22, 2011	104	N/A
A new alcoholic energy drink is killing University of Southern San Diego students. NTSF must team up with the Food and Drug Administration, despite their mutual mistrust, to follow a lead. Guest stars: J. K. Simmons, Gil Ozeri, Casey Wilson
2	2	"The Birthday Party That Was Neither"	Eric Appel	Owen Burke	July 29, 2011	112	N/A
Each member of NTSF gets a mysterious call from a person who claims they have secret information about them. Unbeknownst to the other members, they each must bring a million dollars to a warehouse, leaving Kove alone at NTSF HQ. When the caller is finally revealed, the team gets a blast from the past. Guest stars: John Cho, Ed Helms, Kerri Kenney-Silver
3	3	"Exes and Oh-No's!"	Eric Appel	Paul Scheer	August 5, 2011	102	1.366
Trent discovers one of his ex-wives has undergone a sex change and is trying to steal a San Diego national treasure. Now he must navigate Kove's jealousy and stop his ex before he falls in love with her/him again. Plus, no one has read Piper's book for book club and the meeting is tonight. Guest star: Rich Fulcher
4	4	"The Risky Business of Being Alone in Your Home"	Eric Appel	Rob Huebel	August 12, 2011	111	N/A
Trent is suspended from NTSF and his old nemesis, wheelchair-using Agent Van Damm, replaces him. While Trent is home alone he must fend off terrorists intent on killing him while his defenses are down. Meanwhile, Van Damm becomes the golden boy of NTSF. But something isn't right about this new guy. Guest stars: Jon Daly, Martin Kove, Johanna Parker, Adam Scott
5	5	"Dolphinnegan's Wake"	Ryan McFaul	Curtis Gwinn	August 19, 2011	108	N/A
A dolphin serial killer is on the loose and the NTSF don't have any leads until Trent visits the deadliest dolphin serial killer in captivity to get a lead on this new killer... before Sam and Jessie are its next victims. Guest stars: John Gemberling, Tony Hale, Mark Hamill (voice), Danielle Schneider
6	6	"Tijuana, We've Got a Problem"	Ryan McFaul	Paul Scheer	August 26, 2011	101	1.291
A stripper-astronaut steals the space shuttle plans and sells them to Mexico. Now NTSF must go into Mexico and stop the evil President Felipe Calderon before they beat the U.S.A. in the space race. Guest stars: Lorenzo Lamas, Gabrielle Union
7	7	"Full Hauser"	Ryan McFaul	B.J. Porter and Corinne Marshall	September 2, 2011	109	N/A
In a parody of Casino Royale, Trent has a chance to catch an international terrorist because the cruise ship the terrorist is traveling on will briefly move through San Diego's territorial waters. Trent goes rogue and pretends he's taking the NTSF team on vacation in a ruse to bust this evil man in international waters. But there's a kink when Piper brings her fiance on the cruise without informing him of her secret identity. Guest stars: Moon Bloodgood, Jeff Goldblum, Curtis Gwinn, Riley Steele
8	8	"Up Periscope, Down with San Diego"	Eric Appel	Jonathan Stern	September 9, 2011	107	1.040
Jessie and Sam are kidnapped by a Japanese sub that's been lost at sea for 70 years that lost its way to Pearl Harbor. Now the NTSF must find them and stop their long-delayed attack on San Diego. Guest stars: Dana Lee, Jerry O'Connell
9	9	"Cause for ConCERN"	Ryan McFaul	Jonathan Stern	September 16, 2011	105	1.372
Trent enters a CERN particle accelerator and winds up in an alternate universe where NTSF are the terrorists. Guest stars: Curtis Gwinn, Katie Walder
10	10	"Piper Doesn't Live Here Anymore"	Ryan McFaul	Paul Scheer	September 23, 2011	103	N/A
Piper's brainwashed alter ego, Isabelle Gareth, a highly trained assassin, is activated after receiving a "special" birthday gift. Now she's hunting down all her NTSF teammates. Meanwhile, in the outside world, Jessie's finally given the appreciation she deserves by a model photographer, but does he have ulterior motives? Guest stars: Seth Morris, Wilmer Valderrama
11	11	"Twistin' the Night Away"	Ryan McFaul	Curtis Gwinn	September 30, 2011	110	1.158
Trent tracks the source of strange occurrences, including a hostage situation with SUVs and Sam's partnership with a creepy new team member. Guest stars: Jackie Clarke, Robert Picardo, Matt Walsh
12	12	"I Left My Heart in Someone's Cooler"	Eric Appel	Adam Pally and Gil Ozeri	October 7, 2011	106	N/A
A time bomb is put in place of the President of the Navy's heart and Trent must find the heart and switch it out before the bomb explodes. Guest stars: Courtney Ford, Adam Pally, Julian Sands

=== Season 2 (2012–2013) ===
No. overall	No. in season	Title	Directed by	Written by	Original release date	Prod. code	U.S. viewers (millions)
13	1	"16 Hop Street"	Curtis Gwinn	Curtis Gwinn	August 10, 2012	205	1.257
Trent and Piper pose undercover as high school students, after a mysterious abductor kidnaps all the popular kids. Guest stars: Max Carver, Jon Daly, Nate Hartley, Zack Pearlman, Alex Russell, Paul Rust, Charlie Saxton, Steven Yeun
14	2	"The Real Bicycle Thief"	Eric Appel	Paul Scheer	August 17, 2012	201	1.264
Trent hunts for restaurant terrorists and goes undercover in the Swedish virtual-reality pedicab-racing circuit. Guest stars: Paul Greene, Jake Johnson, Brie Larson, Alan Tudyk, Damon Wayans, Jr.
15	3	"Sabbath-tage"	Ryan McFaul	Paul Scheer, Curtis Gwinn, and Jonathan Stern	August 24, 2012	208	1.273
Sam takes on a terrorist who attacks the city on a Saturday. Guest stars: Diedrich Bader (voice), Adam Ray, Ike Barinholtz, Alison Brie, Jessica Chaffin, Kerri Kenney
16	4	"Lights, Camera, Assassination"	Eric Appel	Paul Scheer	August 31, 2012	204	1.186
A teen idol shadows Trent and Alphonse during the hunt for a killer who targets Hollywood directors; Kove develops a podcast. Guest stars: Max Greenfield, Caity Lotz, Jason Ritter
17	5	"Time Angels"	Eric Appel	Paul Scheer, Curtis Gwinn, and Jonathan Stern	September 7, 2012	206	N/A
Anti-terrorism time travelers join the team to prevent crimes. Guest stars: John de Lancie, Colton Dunn, Sandy Helberg, Kali Hawk, Stacy Keibler, Natasha Leggero, Nicky Whelan
18	6	"Whack-A-Mole"	Eric Appel	Dan Gregor and Doug Mand	September 14, 2012	211	1.294
The team is blamed for the death of Gary the Killer Whale. Guest stars: Ed Helms, Ellie Kemper
19	7	"Robot Town"	Ryan McFaul	Jonathan Stern	September 21, 2012	202	1.197
Trent visits Robot Town to clear Sam of murder charges. Guest stars: Rob Corddry, Bob Odenkirk, Phil Reeves
20	8	"Comic-Con-Flict"	Ryan McFaul	Paul Scheer and Curtis Gwinn	September 28, 2012	209	1.040
Comic fans pose a threat to authors at a San Diego convention. Guest stars: Dave "Gruber" Allen, Paul Feig, Bill Hader, Jason Mantzoukas, Tami Sagher
21	9	"The Return of Dragon Shumway"	Eric Appel	Curtis Gwinn	October 5, 2012	203	1.049
Piper's fiancee has a difficult time letting go of his ninja past. Guest stars: Curtis Gwinn, Jeff Hiller, Rob Huebel
22	10	"Family Dies"	Eric Appel	Paul Scheer, Curtis Gwinn, and Jonathan Stern	October 19, 2012	207	1.279
Trent must kill his father, but things aren't as easy as they sound. Guest star: Michael Gross
23	11	"Prairie Dog Companion"	Ryan McFaul	Joe Mande	October 26, 2012	212	1.322
When San Diego's technology goes on the fritz, not even Siri can navigate out of this modern day hell. Guest stars: Aziz Ansari, Phil Hendrie, Hal Linden
24	12	"Wasilla Hills Cop"	Paul Scheer	Curtis Gwinn, Paul Scheer, and Jonathan Stern	November 2, 2012	210	1.194
Alphonse goes home to Alaska to investigate his partner's death and repair a rift with his father. Guest stars: Kevin Grevioux, Jay Johnston, Ray Liotta, Erin Pineda, Aubrey Plaza, Steven Williams
25	13	"The NTSF: SD: SUV: HISS Infomercial"	Alex Fernie	Alex Fernie, Nick Wiger	November 9, 2012		
26	14	"Christmas Activity"	Curtis Gwinn	Curtis Gwinn, Paul Scheer, Jonathan Stern	December 6, 2012		
27	15	"Inertia"	Alex Fernie	Alex Fernie, Nick Wiger	June 13, 2013		

=== Season 3 (2013) ===
No. overall	No. in season	Title	Directed by	Written by	Original release date	Prod. code	U.S. viewers (millions)
28	1	"Comic Con-Air"	Daniel Kwan and Daniel Scheinert	Alex Fernie and Nick Wiger	July 26, 2013	310	1.128
Comic-Con's worst villains get loose on an airplane. Guest stars: Summer Glau, Matt L. Jones, Joe Lo Truglio, Natasha Lyonne, Horatio Sanz, Abigail Spencer
29	2	"Hawaii Die-0"	Jack Szymanski	Jonathan Stern	August 2, 2013	304	1.318
The President of the Navy is set to deliver the commencement address at the University of Southern San Diego graduation ceremony. Guest stars: Ed Helms, Jim Piddock
30	3	"Extra Terrorist-rial"	Ryan McFaul	Paul Scheer	August 9, 2013	302	0.979
Trent's nephew harbors an alien that seems peaceful. Guest stars: Toby Huss, Kate Micucci (voice), Garrett Ryan, Michaela Watkins
31	4	"Burn After Killing"	Jake Syzmanski	Paul Scheer	August 16, 2013	301	1.314
In a parody of Skyfall, Commander Kove's little black book is stolen. Guest stars: Candace Bailey, Alia Shawkat
32	5	"TGI Murder"	Danny Jelinek	Paul Scheer	August 23, 2013	303	1.089
The team tries to protect a restaurant chain from violent competitors. Guest stars: Jonny Coyne, Drew Droege, Kathryn Hahn, Tommy "Tiny" Lister, Lance Reddick, Armen Weitzman
33	6	"The Great Train Stoppery"	Paul Scheer	Paul Scheer and Jonathan Stern	August 30, 2013	313	1.042
Time Angels travel to the Wild West. Guest stars: Eliza Dushku, Jayma Mays, Santigold, Xander Berkeley, Colton Dunn, Mo Gaffney, Jackson Rathbone, Matt Walsh
34	7	"A Hard Drive to Swallow"	Alex Fernie	Alex Fernie and Nick Wiger	September 6, 2013	308	0.898
The team must create the perfect viral video in order to save S.A.M. from robot hating extremists. Guest stars: Jon Lajoie, John Morrison, Nick Searcy, Betsy Sodaro, Larry Wilmore
35	8	"Unfrozen Agent Man"	Ryan McFaul	Curtis Gwinn	September 13, 2013	305	1.337
An old agent is brought in after his nemesis, 1960's criminal mastermind Hoffstein, escapes from cryonic imprisonment. Guest stars: Matt Bush, Robert Forster, Brett Gelman, Echo Kellum
36	9	"Trading Faces"	Nick Wiger	Matt Bush and Martin Starr	September 20, 2013	306	0.952
Sam and Trent exchange faces to thwart a terrorist organization. Guest stars: Charles Baker, Jack McBrayer, DC Pierson, Andre Royo, Kristen Schaal
37	10	"U-KO'ed"	Paul Scheer	Part 1: Paul Scheer and Jonathan Stern Part 2: Alex Fernie and Nick Wiger	September 27, 2013	311	1.403
When Alphonse is kidnapped, the team must stop an assassination plot that threatens the reunification of the Little Britain district into greater San Diego. The double-length episode was shot on location in London. Guest stars: Roger Ashton-Griffiths, Julian Barratt, Kelly Brook, Anthony Head, Jerry Minor, Steve Oram, Saskia Reeves, Colin Salmon, Mark Slaughter
38	11	"How Piper Got Her Groove Initially"	Paul Scheer	Erica Oyama	October 4, 2013	309	1.010
In a flashback episode to 2003, University of Southern San Diego student Piper Ferguson is recruited to join an elite national terrorism strike force. Guest star: Tara Macken
39	12	"Wreck the Malls"	Daniel Kwan and Daniel Scheinert	Jonathan Stern	December 13, 2013	307	1.157
In the season finale, the mall is taken over by a terrorist Mall Santa, trapping Trent's children inside, and locking the rest of the team out of doing some last-minute Christmas shopping. Guest star: Thomas Lennon

== Specials ==
=== Webisodes: Inertia ===
No.	Title	Directed by	Written by	Original release date
1	"Bomb Bus"	Alex Fernie	Nick Wiger	August 9, 2012
The maiden voyage of a brand new San Diego bus goes awry, after a terrorist rigs it with a bomb that will detonate if the bus goes faster than zero miles per hour. Trapped on board with a motley crew of San Diegans, Trent must do everything he can to keep the bus parked.
2	"Old Man Jennings"	Alex Fernie	Nick Wiger	August 16, 2012
A stubborn old man makes an impulsive decision about the bomb.
3	"Deputy Chief Brinkley"	Alex Fernie	Alex Fernie	August 23, 2012
Trent gets into a battle over jurisdiction with the San Diego transit authority's tightly wound Deputy Chief.
4	"Becca"	Alex Fernie	Alex Fernie	August 30, 2012
The bus driver's now out of commission. Searching for a hero, Trent recruits the spirited and single Becca for the most important job of all: keeping the bus parked.
5	"Tow Truck"	Alex Fernie	Nick Wiger	September 6, 2012
An external threat endangers everyone on board: a tow truck driver wearing headphones.
6	"Mole on the Bus"	Alex Fernie	Nick Wiger	September 13, 2012
Another threat emerges: Trent learns one of the passengers is secretly a henchman for the terrorist. And it's the one person everyone expected to least expect.
7	"Tensions Rise"	Alex Fernie	Nick Wiger	September 20, 2012
The one man who can prevent the passengers from descending into chaos, Trent must fight to keep them from fighting, starting a gang war, or, worst of all – having a baby.
8	"Sam Stuck in Traffic"	Alex Fernie	Alex Fernie	September 27, 2012
Sam rushes to the scene to help disarm the bus bomb, but will he make it in time when he encounters his deadliest enemy yet: rush hour?
9	"The Baby Carriage"	Alex Fernie	Alex Fernie	October 4, 2012
Tragedy head straight towards the booby-trapped bus when a lone, unattended baby carriage rolls directly into its path. But does it contain a baby or – something else?
10	"The Bomber's Lair"	Alex Fernie	Nick Wiger	October 18, 2012
Piper frantically tries to track down the mad man who planted the bomb. But one wrong step and she falls directly into the clutches of the bomber... and crippling self-doubt.
11	"Rise from Your Grave"	Alex Fernie	Nick Wiger	October 25, 2012
The NTSF:SD:SUV team hatches a plan to get all of the passengers safely off the bus before it explodes. But, as the clock ticks down and secrets from Alphonse's past come to light – will they ever be the same again?
12	"Finale"	Alex Fernie	Nick Wiger	November 1, 2012
The bus-bombing terrorist reveals his master plan to the NTSF:SD:SUV team in the only way he knows how: an evil monologue.

=== Special episodes ===
No.	Title	Directed by	Written by	Original release date	Prod. code	U.S. viewers (millions)
1	"The NTSF:SD:SUV:HISS Infomercial"	Alex Fernie	Alex Fernie and Nick Wiger	November 9, 2012	214	1.095
Trent introduces a new iPhone app to help identify potential terrorists. Guest stars: Adam Pally, Lennon Parham. This special was also aired as part of Infomercials.
2	"Christmas Activity"	Curtis Gwinn	Curtis Gwinn, Paul Scheer, and Jonathan Stern	December 7, 2012	213	1.196
While celebrating Christmas together at Kove's house, the team is attacked by the evil Alaskan Santa Claus. Guest star: Curtis Gwinn, Sonny Surowiec
3	"Inertia"	Alex Fernie	Nick Wiger and Alex Fernie	June 13, 2013	215	1.708
A bomb on a bus is set to explode if the bus goes over zero miles an hour. A condensed edit of the 2012 web series. Guest stars: Matt Braunger, Echo Kellum

=== Spin-off ===
No.	Title	Directed by	Written by	Original release date
1	"Swords, Knives, Very Sharp Objects and Cutlery"	Eric Appel	Rob Huebel	November 27, 2012
An advertisement for Dragon Shumway and his complete Sword Collection.

== International broadcast ==
In Canada, NTSF:SD:SUV:: previously aired on G4's Adult Digital Distraction block, and currently airs on the Canadian version of Adult Swim.
