= Abominable Pictures =

American film and television production company

- Type: Private
- Industry: Television, Film, Digital Media
- Founded: 2006; 20 years ago
- Founder: Jonathan Stern
- Headquarters: United States
- Key people: Jonathan Stern (Founder, Executive Producer)
- Products: Television series, Web series, Films
- Services: Content development and production

Abominable Pictures is an American creator-driven comedy production company that develops and produces content for television, web and film.

== Output ==
Producer Jonathan Stern founded Abominable in 2006 to produce the first season of internet cult-hit Wainy Days with creator and frequent collaborator David Wain. The success of Wainy Days, which released its 40th episode in 2012, was followed by the web series Horrible People and Hot Sluts, both created by A.D. Miles, Funny or Die Presents on HBO, and Childrens Hospital, created by Rob Corddry.

Childrens Hospital became a television show on Adult Swim, where it aired seven seasons and won two Emmy awards.

Abominable has also produced three seasons of procedural-crime comedy NTSF:SD:SUV::, created by Paul Scheer, and two seasons of You’re Whole, created by Michael Ian Black, both on Adult Swim as well as two seasons of Newsreaders, a fake-newsmagazine spinoff of Childrens Hospital and the first season of Garfunkel and Oates which aired on IFC. Abominable has also produced a collection of parody infomercials for Adult Swim; the second and third sets are currently in post-production.

At the same time, Abominable has maintained an active web series slate, led by 3 seasons of the popular, Emmy-nominated Bachelor parody Burning Love for both Yahoo and E!. Abominable recently premiered The Hotwives of Orlando on Hulu to fantastic reviews. It is currently in post-production on the courtroom parody Beef for Paramount Digital. Abominable has a first-look deal with Fox for comedy projects on digital platforms.

Executive Producer Jonathan Stern's past projects as a producer include the pilot of Louie on FX and feature films Oxygen, Mexico City, Scotland, PA, The Vagina Monologues, Confess, Diggers, and David Wain's The Ten.

== Filmography ==
=== Films and television ===
Year	Title
2010–2016	Childrens Hospital
2010-2011	Funny or Die Presents
2011-2013	NTSF:SD:SUV::
2012-2013	Burning Love
2012-2014	You're Whole
2012	Swords, Knives, Very Sharp Objects and Cutlery
2013–2015	Newsreaders
2013	Filthy Sexy Teen$
2013	Broomshakalaka
2013	For-Profit Online University
2014	Garfunkel and Oates
2014	Fartcopter
2014	The Salad Mixxxer
2014	Alpha Chow & Goth Fitness
2014	In Search of Miracle Man
2015	Other Space
2015	Wet Hot American Summer: First Day of Camp
2017–2018	Mystery Science Theater 3000
2017	Wet Hot American Summer: Ten Years Later
2017	Do You Want To See a Dead Body?
2018	A Futile and Stupid Gesture
2020	Medical Police
2020	Brews Brothers
2020	A Very Special G4 Reunion Special
2020	11 Minute Whambam 90’s Ride!
2021	Scooby-Doo, Where Are You Now!
2022	Murderville
2026	The Terrors of Jordan Mendoza

=== Web ===
Year	Title
2007-2012	Wainy Days
2008	Horrible People
2008	Childrens Hospital
2009	Hot Sluts
Example	Garfunkel and Oates
Example	Burning Love
Example	The Hotwives of Orlando
Example	Beef
