= June Diane Raphael =

American actress, comedian, and screenwriter (born 1980)

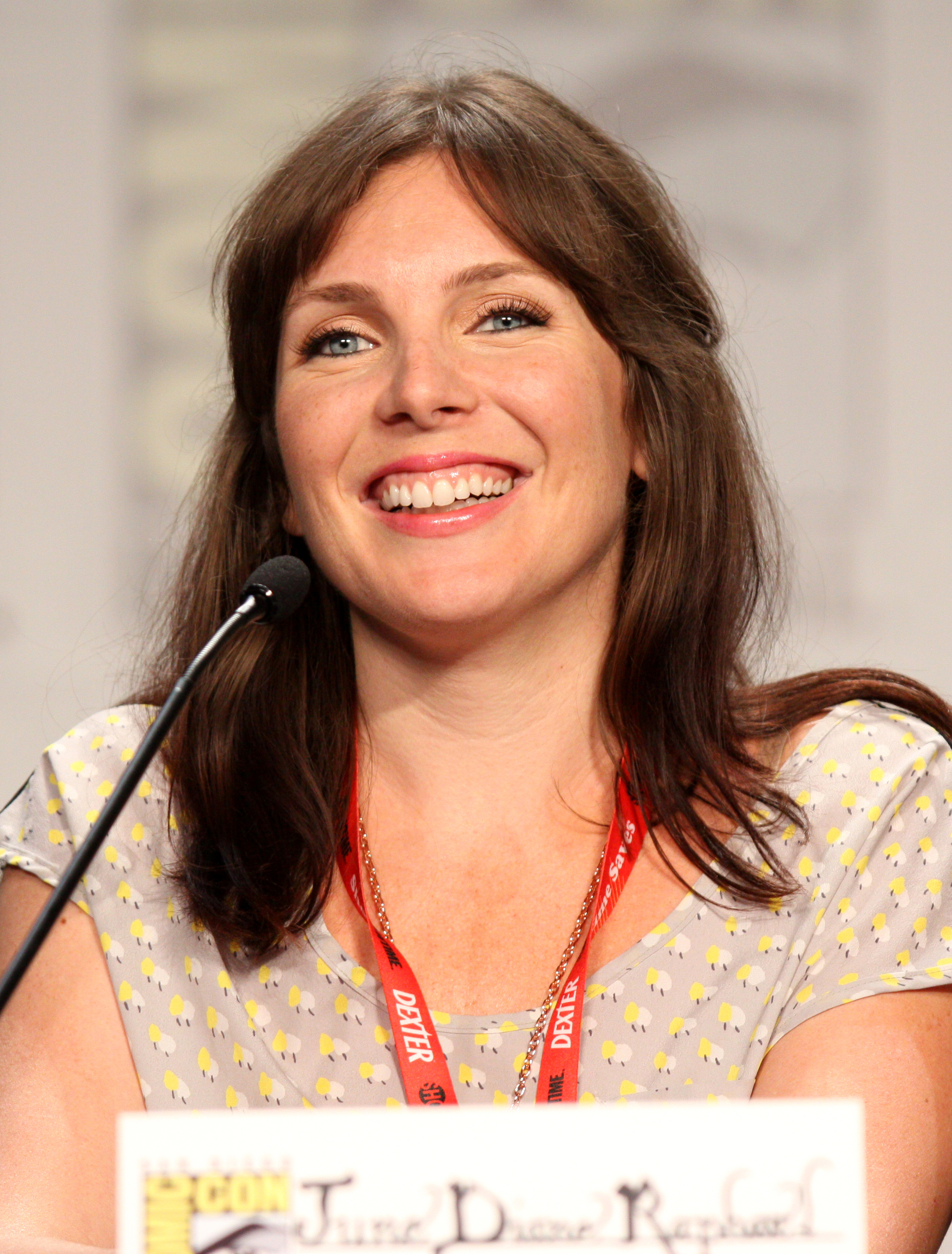
- Raphael at the 2011 San Diego Comic-Con
- Born: January 4, 1980 (age 46); Rockville Centre, New York, U.S.
- Education: New York University (BFA)
- Occupations: Actress; comedian; writer
- Years active: 2002–present
- Spouse: Paul Scheer (m. 2009)
- Children: 2

June Diane Raphael (/ˈreɪfiːl/ RAY-feel; born January 4, 1980) is an American actress, comedian, and screenwriter. She has starred in TV comedy programs Burning Love, Adult Swim's NTSF:SD:SUV::, and Grace and Frankie. Notable film work includes supporting roles in Year One and Unfinished Business, as well as her 2013 Sundance film Ass Backwards, which she co-wrote and starred in with her creative partner Casey Wilson. She currently co-hosts both How Did This Get Made? alongside Jason Mantzoukas and her husband Paul Scheer, and The Deep Dive with Jessica St. Clair.

== Early life ==
Raphael was born and raised in Rockville Centre, New York, to Diane and John Raphael, where she graduated from South Side High School in 1998. She is of Irish descent, and was raised Catholic.

== Career ==
Raphael began her comedy career writing and performing with the Upright Citizens Brigade Theatre (UCB) in New York and later in Los Angeles. Among her best known work at UCB was the long-running sketch show Rode Hard and Put Away Wet, written and performed alongside her comedy partner and best friend Casey Wilson; the stage show ran from 2003 to 2006 in New York and Los Angeles and was an official selection at 2005's US Comedy Arts Festival in Aspen, Colorado. Raphael and Wilson's comedic partnership has since branched out into an active writing career in film and television; they co-wrote their first screenplay for the comedy Bride Wars, in which they also appeared in supporting roles.

As a film and television actress, Raphael has made appearances on shows such as Party Down, Happy Endings, New Girl, and Lady Dynamite and in films such as Long Shot and Blockers. In 2010, Raphael co-starred as Barb in the improvised comedy series Players on Spike TV. She also starred in all three seasons of the web series Burning Love alongside Ken Marino and Michael Ian Black.

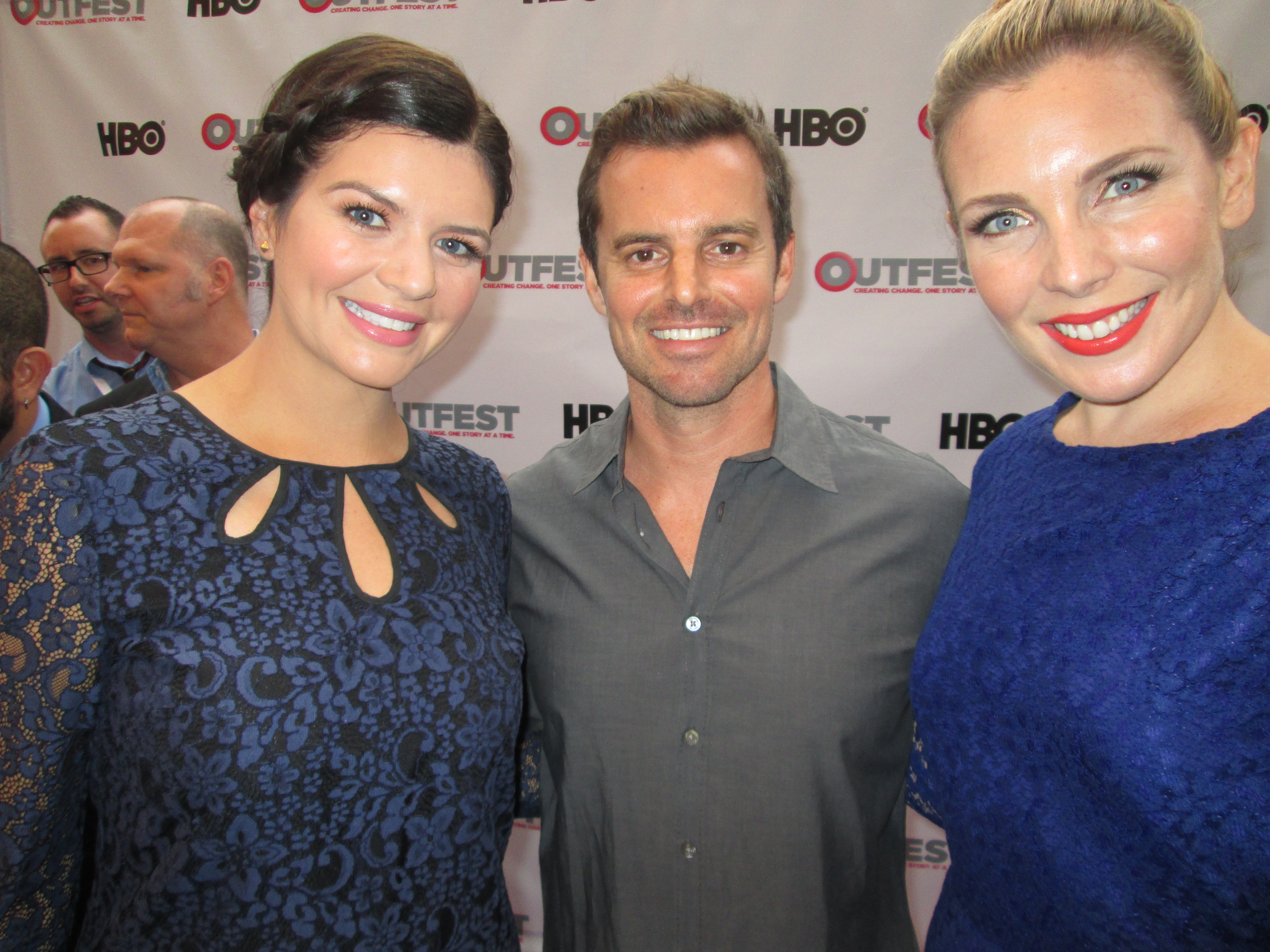
Raphael (right) and Casey Wilson (left) with Ass Backwards director Chris Nelson at the 2013 Outfest film festival

Raphael has collaborated with writing partner Casey Wilson on scripts for film and television. They most recently wrote and starred together in the raunchy female buddy comedy Ass Backwards, which also co-stars Alicia Silverstone, Jon Cryer, Vincent D'Onofrio, Paul Scheer, and Bob Odenkirk. The film premiered at the Sundance Film Festival on January 21, 2013. In 2013 it was reported that Raphael and Wilson were working on a second film to star in together, produced by Will Ferrell and Adam McKay's company Gary Sanchez Productions.

In February 2010, Raphael joined the rotating cast of the Off-Broadway play Love, Loss, and What I Wore (written by Nora Ephron and Delia Ephron) at the Westside Theatre in Manhattan. Raphael and Casey Wilson created the comedic stage show The Realest Real Housewives, which they starred in alongside Jessica St. Clair, Melissa Rauch, Danielle Schneider and Morgan Walsh. The show began running monthly at the Los Angeles Upright Citizens Brigade Theatre in 2011. Raphael also contributed short stories to the 2010 book Worst Laid Plans, based on the long-running stage show, in which she frequently performed.

Raphael co-starred in the Adult Swim action-comedy series NTSF:SD:SUV::, which aired for three seasons from 2011 to 2013. She currently co-hosts with her husband, Paul Scheer, the movie discussion podcast How Did This Get Made? along with comedian Jason Mantzoukas. The podcast is a roundtable discussion where Scheer, Raphael, Mantzoukas and other special guests "try make sense of movies that make absolutely no sense."

In 2015, Raphael joined the main cast of the Netflix comedy series Grace and Frankie, which co-starred Jane Fonda, Lily Tomlin, Martin Sheen and Sam Waterston. It ran until 2022.

Together with Kate Black, Raphael authored the book Represent: The Woman's Guide to Running for Office and Changing the World, a step-by-step guide for women who are considering a political career.

== Personal life ==
Raphael is married to actor-comedian Paul Scheer. They met in January 2004, after first meeting when the artistic director of Manhattan's Upright Citizens Brigade Theatre brought Scheer in to offer advice to Raphael and her comedy partner Casey Wilson on making improvements to their UCB two-woman sketch show. They moved from New York to Los Angeles in 2005. In October 2009, they married at the Santa Barbara Museum of Natural History. They have two sons, born 2014 and 2016.

== Filmography ==
=== Film ===
Year	Title	Role	Notes
2006	The Wedding Weekend	Ted's Tammy	
2006	Caffeine: A Love Story	June	Short film
2007	Zodiac	Mrs. Carol Toschi	
2008	Forgetting Sarah Marshall	Ann at the Bar	
2009	Bride Wars	Amanda	Also writer
2009	Year One	Maya	
2010	The Dry Land	Susie	
2010	Cried Suicide	Jessica	Short film
2010	Going the Distance	Karen	
2010	Weakness	Elizabeth	
2012	Bachelorette	Cool Stripper	
2012	Girl Most Likely	Dara	
2013	Ass Backwards	Kate Fenner	Also writer and executive producer
2013	Anchorman 2: The Legend Continues	Chani's Boss	
2015	Unfinished Business	Susan Truckman	
2015	Bad Night	Ms. Goldstein	
2017	Girlfriend's Day	Karen Lamb	
2017	The Disaster Artist	Robyn Paris	
2018	Blockers	Brenda	
2019	Long Shot	Maggie Millikin	
2020	The High Note	Gail	
2021	Yes Day	Aurora Peterson	Uncredited
2021	8-Bit Christmas	Kathy Doyle	
2022	Cheaper by the Dozen	Anne Vaughn	
2023	Scrambled	Monroe	
2025	Weapons	Donna Morgan	
2025	Freakier Friday	Veronica	
2026	Stop! That! Train!	Chic Woman	

=== Television ===
Year	Title	Role	Notes
2002	Ed	Student	Episode: "Memory Lane"
2007	Derek and Simon: The Show	June	Episode: "I Love You"
2007	Flight of the Conchords	Felicia	Episode: "Girlfriends"
2007	The Very Funny Show	Cast Member	Series regular
2007–2008	Human Giant	Various	4 episodes
2009	In the Motherhood	Liz	Episode: "It Takes a Village Idiot"
2010	Party Down	Danielle Lugozshe	2 episodes
2010	Players	Barb Tolan	Series regular; 10 episodes
2010	Big Lake	Miss Hauser	Episode: "Fad Diet"
2010–2011	Funny or Die Presents	Various Characters	5 episodes
2011	Happy Endings	Melinda Shershow	Episode: "The Shershow Redemption"
2011	Free Agents	Julie	Episode: "Sexin' the Raisin"
2011–2013	NTSF:SD:SUV::	Piper Ferguson	Series regular; 35 episodes
2011–present	American Dad!	Suze Tate, various voices	20 episodes
2012	Animal Practice	Dr. Jill Leiter	3 episodes
2012	Electric City	Eva Jacobs	2 episodes
2012–2013	Burning Love	Julie Gristlewhite	Series regular; 34 episodes
2012–2013	Whitney	Chloe	2 episodes
2012–2018	New Girl	Sadie	8 episodes
2013	Drunk History	Isabella Stewart Gardner	Episode: "Boston"
2013	Kroll Show	Dina Bludd	Episode: "Soaked in Success"
2013	Inside Amy Schumer	Mandy	Episode: "Bridal Shower"
2013	Parks and Recreation	Tynnyfer	Episode: "Doppelgängers"
2014	The Greatest Event in Television History	Emily Scott	Episode: "Bosom Buddies"
2014	The Mason Twins	Pender Mason	TV pilot; also creator, executive producer
2014	BoJack Horseman	Various voices	Episode: "Later"
2014	The Birthday Boys	Barbara O'Shaughnessy	Episode: "Women Are Funny"
2014–2015	The League	Pam	2 episodes
2015	Marry Me	Molly	Episode: "Surprise Me"
2015	The Hotwives of Las Vegas	Jandice	Episode: "Old Friends, New Enemies"
2015–2022	Grace and Frankie	Brianna Hanson	Series regular; 83 episodes
2016	The Muppets	Lucy Royce	2 episodes
2016	Lady Dynamite	Karen Grisham	3 episodes
2016	Another Period	Eleanor Roosevelt	Episode: "Roosevelt"
2016	The Amazing Gayl Pile	Mindy Walker-Fantino	Episode #3.1
2017	Veep	Helen Wright	Episode: "Library"
2017	Bajillion Dollar Propertie$	Sabra	Episode: "The Wheelbarrows"
2017	Playing House	Vanessa	Episode: "None of Your Business"
2017	Curb Your Enthusiasm	Bebe	Episode: "The Accidental Text On Purpose"
2017–2025	Big Mouth	Devin LeSeven (voice)	35 episodes
2018	Little Big Awesome	Sheena (voice)	Episode: "No Throwing Disc Left Behind/Happy Birthday, Here's a Goat!"
2019	Fresh Off the Boat	Guru Sheela	Episode: "Just The Two Of Us"
2019	Splitting Up Together	Tamryn Thomas Vandeloo	Episode: "Baby's First Job Interview"
2019	I'm Sorry	Jill	Episode: "Little Louse on the Prairie"
2020–2021	Black Monday	Corky Harris	8 episodes
2021	The Goldbergs	Pamela	Episode: "Cocoon"
2021	Nine Perfect Strangers	Erin (voice)	Episode: "Random Acts of Mayhem"; uncredited
2021	Star Trek: Lower Decks	Queen Paolana (voice)	Episode: "Where Pleasant Fountains Lie"
2022	Home Economics	Lauren	2 episodes
2022	Everything's Trash	Jax	3 episodes
2022	Little Demon	Amanda (voice)	Episode: "Night of the Leeches"
2023	Moon Girl and Devil Dinosaur	Marcy Muzzler (voice)	Episode: "Like Mother, Like Moon Girl"
2023	The Loud House	Bella "Big" Bucks (voice)	Episode: "Can't Lynn Em All"
2023	Frasier	June Patrick	Episode: "Blind Date"
2023–2024	Based on a True Story	Romy Lipinski	7 episodes
2023–2025	The Morning Show	Ashley Andrews	4 episodes
2023–2025	Abbott Elementary	Elizabeth Washington	3 episodes
2023–2025	Big City Greens	Babe	4 episodes
2024	Krapopolis	Eurynomos' Wife (voice)	Episode: "Hades Nuts"
2025	RuPaul's Drag Race	Herself (guest judge)	Episode: "Drag Baby Mamas"
2025	9-1-1	Tricia Benoit	3 episodes
2026	Mating Season	Fawn (voice)	Main role; 10 episodes
2026	Elle	Eva Woods	Main role
2026	Life, Larry and the Pursuit of Unhappiness	Eliza Donner	Episode: "Lawrence"
