= Do You Want to See a Dead Body? =

American surreal comedy web television series

- Genre: Surreal comedy
- Created by: Owen Burke; Rob Huebel
- Starring: Rob Huebel
- Country of origin: United States
- Original language: English
- No. of seasons: 1
- No. of episodes: 15

Production
- Executive producers: Owen Burke; Rob Huebel; Nicholas Jasenovec; Harper Steele (Note: Credited as Andrew Steele; Steele came out as transgender and changed her name in 2022.); Jonathan Stern
- Producer: David Soldinger
- Camera setup: Single-camera
- Running time: 12–23 minutes
- Production companies: Abominable Pictures; 3 Feet Under; Funny or Die

Original release
- Network: YouTube Premium
- Release: November 17, 2017

Related
- Funny or Die Presents

Do You Want to See a Dead Body? is an American surreal comedy web series created by Owen Burke and Rob Huebel that premiered on November 17, 2017, on YouTube Red.

On April 10, 2019, YouTube canceled the series.

== Premise ==
Do You Want to See a Dead Body? follows "Rob Huebel and his celebrity friends who begrudgingly join him on adventures that see them frolicking at the beach, getting tacos...oh...and seeing a dead body."

== Cast and characters ==
=== Main ===
- Rob Huebel as himself

=== Recurring ===
- Josh Robert Thompson as the voice of Morgan Freeman

=== Guest ===
- Rory Scovel as Cool Pharmacist ("A Body and a Puddle")
- Seth Morris as Nude Beach Bully 1 ("A Body and an Actor")
- John Gemberling as Nude Beach Bully 2 ("A Body and an Actor")
- Ron Funches as Terry ("A Body and a Plane")
- Eugene Cordero as Gregory ("A Body and a High School Reunion")
- Diona Reasonover as Julie ("A Body and Some Pants")
- Brody Stevens as Brody ("A Body and Some Pants)
- Neil Casey as Dead Guy ("A Body and Some Pants")
- Rich Fulcher as Derek ("A Body and an Ex-Con")
- Dana Gaier as Daria ("A Body and a Jet Ski")
- Matthew Glave as Mel ("A Body and a Breakup")
- Monika Smith as Katie ("A Body and a Breakup")
- Brandon Wardell as Edvard ("A Body and a Breakup")

== Episodes ==
| No. | Title | Featured celebrity | Directed by | Written by | Original release date |
|---|---|---|---|---|---|
| 1 | "A Body and a Puddle" | Adam Scott & Terry Crews | Nicholas Jasenovec | Story by : Owen Burke & Rob Huebel; Teleplay by : Rob Huebel | November 17, 2017 |
| 2 | "A Body and Some Quicksand" | John Cho | Nicholas Jasenovec | Alex Fernie & Seth Morris | November 17, 2017 |
| 3 | "A Body and a Mean Dog" | Rob Corddry | Nicholas Jasenovec | Alex Fernie | November 17, 2017 |
| 4 | "A Body and an Actor" | Justin Long | Alex Fernie | Jane Becker & Seth Morris | November 17, 2017 |
| 5 | "A Body and a Plane" | Alexandra Daddario | Alex Fernie | Rob Huebel & Charlie Sanders | November 17, 2017 |
| 6 | "A Body and a High School Reunion" | Joe Lo Truglio | Alex Fernie | Story by : Jane Becker; Teleplay by : Alex Fernie & Rob Huebel | November 17, 2017 |
| 7 | "A Body and a Crater" | Randall Park | Nicholas Jasenovec | Alex Fernie | November 17, 2017 |
| 8 | "A Body and a Train" | Matt Walsh | Alex Fernie | Rob Huebel | November 17, 2017 |
| 9 | "A Body and Some Pants" | Michaela Watkins | Nicholas Jasenovec | Jane Becker & Rob Huebel | November 17, 2017 |
| 10 | "A Body and a Bust" | Horatio Sanz | Alex Fernie | Charlie Sanders | November 17, 2017 |
| 11 | "A Body and an Ex-Con" | Danny Pudi | Alex Fernie | Story by : Rob Huebel; Teleplay by : Seth Morris & Charlie Sanders | November 17, 2017 |
| 12 | "A Body and a Jet Ski" | Lil Rel Howery | Alex Fernie | Alex Fernie | November 17, 2017 |
| 13 | "A Body and a Breakup" | Judy Greer | Nicholas Jasenovec | Story by : Jane Becker; Teleplay by : Alex Fernie & Seth Morris | November 17, 2017 |
| 14 | "A Body and a Bachelor Party" | Adam Pally | Alex Fernie | Alex Fernie & Rob Huebel | November 17, 2017 |
| 15 | "A Body and an Ex-Roommate" | Paul Scheer | Nicholas Jasenovec | Jane Becker & Seth Morris | November 17, 2017 |

== Production ==
=== Background ===
The concept for the series originated out of a recurring sketch from the HBO series Funny or Die Presents. Those sketches eventually made their way to YouTube and the FunnyOrDie website where they received more notability. Rob Huebel and Owen Burke, who created those original sketches, later decided to expand upon them with a full series. Huebel has commented that the show was loosely inspired by his fascination with 1980s projects like Stand by Me (the title of the series being in-reference to a quote from the film) where kids could go off into the wilderness in search of an adventure, in addition to moments from Huebel's own childhood when he and childhood friends would “find Penthouse magazines in these weird forts of teenagers.”

=== Development ===
On June 22, 2017, it was announced that YouTube had given the production a series order for a first season consisting of eight episodes. Executive producers were set to include Rob Huebel, Owen Burke, Nick Jasenovec, and Jonathan Stern. Production companies producing the series include Abominable Pictures and Funny or Die.

=== Casting ===
Alongside the series order announcement, it was confirmed that Rob Huebel would star in the series and that it would feature guest appearances from Adam Scott, Judy Greer, Terry Crews, Craig Robinson, and John Cho, among others.
