= Burning Love (TV series) =

- Genre: Parody; Deadpan
- Created by: Erica Oyama
- Written by: Erica Oyama
- Directed by: Ken Marino
- Starring: Michael Ian Black; Ken Marino; June Diane Raphael
- Country of origin: United States
- No. of seasons: 3
- No. of episodes: 42

Production
- Executive producers: Jonathan Stern; Stuart Cornfeld; Mike Rosenstein; Ken Marino; Erica Oyama; Ben Stiller
- Running time: 12 minutes 22 minutes (syndicated version)
- Production companies: Red Hour Films; Abominable Pictures; Dancing Workfriend; Insurge Pictures; Yahoo! Studios

Original release
- Network: Yahoo! Screen; E! (syndicated version)
- Release: June 4, 2012 – April 29, 2013

Burning Love is a comedy web series that is a spoof of reality dating competition shows like The Bachelor and The Bachelorette. The show was created and written by Erica Oyama, while her husband, Ken Marino, co-produced, directed and starred in the series. Ben Stiller was one of the series' executive producers and appeared in a supporting role.

The show premiered on the web on Yahoo! Screen's Comedy Channel and was later picked up for television. In 2013, the series was nominated for an Emmy Award in the Outstanding Special Class - Short-format Live-Action Entertainment Programs category.

== Cast ==
=== Season 1 ===
- Ken Marino as Mark Orlando, the bachelor
- Michael Ian Black as Bill Tundle, the host

The contestants:

- Kristen Bell as Mandy, a devout Christian
- June Diane Raphael as Julie Gristlewhite, the "damaged goods" contestant
- Ken Jeong as Ballerina, the "exotic" contestant
- Malin Åkerman as Willow, a homeless woman
- Natasha Leggero as Haley, the sex freak
- Abigail Spencer as Annie, the "too perfect" contestant
- Carla Gallo as Tamara P, a blind contestant
- Helen Slayton-Hughes as Agnes, the older woman
- Noureen DeWulf as Titi, the rich contestant
- Morgan Walsh as Vivian, a pregnant contestant
- Jennifer Aniston as Dana, who keeps her identity secret
- Beth Dover as Lexie, a contestant obsessed with Mark
- Erin Muroski as Destiny, the desperate contestant
- Deanna Russo as Tamara G, who has a medical condition - a monkey heart
- Janet Varney as Carly, a lesbian
- Erica Oyama as Shera

Other characters:

- Ben Stiller as Joe Rutherford, the previous season's bachelor
- Christine Taylor as Symphony, Joe's wife he picked from the previous season
- Cindy Caponera as Cindy
- Matt Ballard as Limo Driver
- Chris Farah as Kiki
- Colton Dunn as Tim, the medic
- Brian George as Raj
- Adam Scott as Damien, Mark's "psychiatrist"
- Mo Gaffney as Traci
- Matt Besser as Phil
- Brian Huskey as Hershel, Agnes' son
- Mather Zickel as Brock Glencoe, trainer to the stars
- Kerri Kenney-Silver as Jay, Mark's friend
- Ryan Hansen as the "Cowboy Waiter"
- Paul Scheer as Kip, a stand-up comedian
- Zandy Hartig as Owner of a Burning House

=== Season 2 cast ===
- June Diane Raphael as Julie Gristlewhite, the bachelorette
- Michael Ian Black as Bill Tundle, the host

The contestants:

- Adam Scott as Damien, Mark's former "psychologist"
- Joe Lo Truglio as Alex, the single dad who's emotional about not seeing his son
- Paul Scheer as Robby Z, a party motivator
- Rob Huebel as Simon, a prince
- Jerry O'Connell as Henry, a contractor from Provo, UT and an all-around good guy
- Adam Brody as Max, a decent human being who happens to be Jewish
- Michael Cera as Wally, an intellectual who is a hopeless romantic
- Colin Hanks as Allison, the classy one
- Martin Starr as Leo, the grown up premature baby
- Ryan Hansen as Blaze, the bad boy
- Nick Kroll as Khris, a baby-sitter who recently had a bad breakup
- Kumail Nanjiani as Zakir, the token ethnic contestant
- Nick Thune as Teddy, the musical one
- Brandon Johnson as Trevor, one of the bonus contestants

Other characters:

- Ben Stiller as Joe Rutherford, the bachelor from the show's (fictional) first season, now living in extreme poverty due to bad investments
- Christine Taylor as Symphony, Joe's wife
- Ken Marino as Mark Orlando, the previous season's bachelor
- Deanna Russo as Tamara G, who Mark has since broken up with
- Colton Dunn as Tim, the medic
- Abigail Spencer as Annie, bachelorette on the fictional "Burning Love: Hot for Teacher" season
- Paul Rudd as Annie's ex-fiancée
- Jessica St. Clair as Polly
- Katie Aselton as Idina Blimperson
- Rob Corddry as Lorenzo Blimperson
- Drew Droege as Cyrano Cruze-Shippe
- Rebecca Romijn as Katie
- Jensen Karp as Hot Karl
- Lindsey Kraft as Rebecca
- Janet Varney as Carly

=== Season 3 cast ===
- Michael Ian Black as Bill Tundle, the host

The contestants:

- June Diane Raphael as Julie, the "damaged goods" contestant (Mark's season, Julie's season)
- Joe Lo Truglio as Alex, the single dad who's emotional about not seeing his son (Julie's season)
- Natasha Leggero as Haley, the sex freak (Mark's season)
- Rob Huebel as Simon, a prince (Julie's season)
- Leslie Bibb as Bevarly, the southern party girl (Joe's season)
- Ryan Hansen as Blaze, the bad boy (Julie's season)
- Abigail Spencer as Annie, the "too perfect" contestant (Mark's season, Annie's season)
- Alex Anfanger as Noah, the virgin (Annie's season)
- Carly Craig as Felicia, the hot one (Joe's season)
- Kumail Nanjiani as Zakir, the bonus contestant (Julie's season)
- Helen Slayton-Hughes as Virginia, the twin of Agnes (from Mark's season), the older woman
- Armen Weitzman as Hathwell, the super fan
- Morgan Walsh as Vivian, a formerly pregnant contestant (Mark's season)
- Ken Marino as Mark, the sexy fireman (Mark's season)
- Christine Taylor as Symphony, the regretful winner (Joe's season)
- Beth Dover as Lexie, a contestant obsessed with Blaze (Mark's season)
- Janet Varney as Carly, the lesbian (Mark's season)
- Rob Delaney as Kirk, the life of the party (Annie's season)

Other characters:

- Thomas Lennon as Lev Realness, a pop singer who sleeps with Haley
- Casey Wilson as Aunt Pam, Julie's aunt who gives her and Mark relationship counseling over the phone.
- Jeff Ross as himself
- Seth Rogen as Roger, a trainee medic
- Colton Dunn as Tim, the medic
- Paul Scheer as Robby Z, who returns as a judge for the dancing competition
- Carla Gallo as Tamara P, who returns as a judge for the dancing competition
- David Wain as Reg Durjmah, a "famed raincoat designer" who is the third judge for the dancing competition

== Story and episodes ==
Depending on the season, the show either follows a man or a woman who is looking for the perfect mate from a pool of contestants, or has contestants living together in a mansion competing for a cash prize. Season one showcases fireman Mark Orlando (Ken Marino) as the bachelor. Season two of the series, which premiered in February 2013, stars June Diane Raphael reprising her role as season one contestant Julie, now the bachelorette given the chance to find the perfect man. Season three also premiered in 2013 and starred former contestants from seasons one and two competing for a $900 prize rather than for love (similar to Bachelor spin-off, Bachelor Pad).

=== Season chronology ===
The seasons of the show as listed do not match the internally referenced season chronology because of two fictitious seasons. Internally season one references the Joe Rutherford (Ben Stiller) season, and seasons two and three references the Annie (Abigail Spencer) season. Neither of these seasons was produced but occurred within the fiction of the show with events from those seasons being frequently mentioned during the course of various real episodes. Season three also announced a nonexistent season with superfan Hathwell Crisping.

- Burning Love with Joe Rutherford (nonexistent)
- Burning Love with Mark Orlando (Season One)
- Burning Love: Hot For Teacher with Annie (nonexistent)
- Burning Love with Julie Gristlewhite (Season Two)
- Burning Love: Burning Down The House (Season Three)
- Burning Love: A Fanty Tale with Hathwell Granger Crisping (nonexistent)

=== Season 1 ===
Mark's Call-Out Order
| # | Bachelorettes | Episodes | | | | | | | | |
| # | Bachelorettes | 1 | 2 | 4 | 5 | 6/7 | 8/9/10 | 11 | 13 | 14^{†} |
|---|---|---|---|---|---|---|---|---|---|---|
| 1 | Annie | Tamara G. | Titi | Tamara G. | Annie | Willow | Titi | Annie | Annie | Annie |
| 2 | Agnes | Julie | Julie | Titi | Julie | Titi | Carly | Carly | Carly | Titi |
| 3 | Ballerina | Annie | Lexie | Haley | Tamara G. | Carly | Annie | Titi | Ballerina^{1} | Carly |
| 4 | Carly | Haley | Haley | Agnes | Titi | Tamara G. | Willow | | | Tamara G. |
| 5 | Dana | Mandy | Agnes | Annie | Vivian | Haley | Tamara G. | | | |
| 6 | Destiny | Willow | Willow | Vivian | Carly | Annie | Haley | | | |
| 7 | Haley | Titi | Carly | Willow | Willow | Vivian | | | | |
| 8 | Julie | Carly | Mandy | Carly | Haley | Julie | | | | |
| 9 | Lexie | Agnes | Vivian | Lexi | Agnes | Agnes | | | | |
| 10 | Mandy | Lexie | Annie | Julie | Lexi | | | | | |
| 11 | Shera | Tamara P. | Tamara G. | Mandy | | | | | | |
| 12 | Tamara G. | Destiny | Dana | | | | | | | |
| 13 | Tamara P. | Vivian | Destiny | | | | | | | |
| 14 | Titi | Dana | Tamara P. | | | | | | | |
| 15 | Vivian | Ballerina | Ballerina | | | | | | | |
| 16 | Willow | Shera | | | | | | | | |

- ^{1} Bachelor Mark decided that this contestant was who he wanted to propose to.
- ^{†} The after the final hose ceremony episode.

The contestant was eliminated when bachelorettes first arrived.
The contestant was eliminated during hose ceremony.
The contestant was eliminated by other contestants.
The contestant received hose on group date.
The contestant was eliminated in episode 6 on one-on-one date.
The contestant was eliminated in episode 8 for violating rules.
The contestant was eliminated in episode 9 on two-on-one date.
The contestant was eliminated in the final proposal ceremony.
The contestant was proposed to and accepted proposal.
The contestant was proposed to and rejected proposal.

=== Season 2 ===
Julie's Call-Out Order
| Order | Episode | | | | | | |
| Order | 1/2 | 3/4 | 5 | 6/7 | 8/9/10 | 11 | 12/13 |
|---|---|---|---|---|---|---|---|
| 1 | Blaze | Blaze | Blaze | Simon | Blaze | Alex* | Mark |
| 2 | Simon | Henry | Allison | Leo | Henry | Henry* | Blaze |
| 3 | Alex | Wally | Henry | Henry | Alex | Blaze | Alex |
| 4 | Max | Alex | Alex | Max | Max | | Henry |
| 5 | Leo | Max | Max | Alex | Leo | | |
| 6 | Henry | Allison | Teddy | Blaze | Simon | | |
| 7 | Wally | Teddy | Leo | Teddy | | | |
| 8 | Damien | Leo | Simon | Allison | | | |
| 9 | Robby Z | Simon | Wally | | | | |
| 10 | Teddy | Damien | | | | | |
| 11 | Allison | Robby Z | | | | | |
| 12 | Zakir | Zakir | | | | | |
| 13 | Khris | | | | | | |

- ^{*} Both contestants were given the box simultaneously

The contestant was eliminated at the box ceremony
The contestant was eliminated for being too drunk, getting into a fight, and urinating in the wine cellar.
The contestant was eliminated while on the puppet date for calling it 'dumb'
The contestant left on his own for not being into Julie
The contestant was given a box while on zoo date
The contestant was given a box while on camping date
The contestant left on his own since Julie isn't Jewish
The contestant proposed to Julie but she rejected him
The contestant proposed to Julie but then he had to bounce because he wasn't into Julie
The contestant proposed to Julie who accepted but then removed her acceptance to accept Blaze's then Mark's Proposal
The contestant proposed to Julie and she accepted

=== Season 3: Contestant standings by episode ===
| # | Contestants | Episodes | | | | | | | | | | | | | |
| # | Contestants | 1 | 2 | 3 | 4 | 5 | 6 | 7 | 8 | 9 | 10 | 11 | 12 | 13 | 14 |
|---|---|---|---|---|---|---|---|---|---|---|---|---|---|---|---|
| 1 | Annie | IN | IN | IN | IN | IN | IN | IN | IN | IN | IN | IN | IN | IN | WIN |
| 2 | Blaze | IN | IN | IN | IN | IN | IN | IN | IN | IN | IN | IN | IN | IN | OUT |
| 3 | Julie | IN | IN | IN | IN | IN | IN | IN | IN | IN | IN | OUT | IN | IN | OUT |
| 4 | Mark | IN | IN | IN | IN | IN | IN | IN | IN | IN | IN | IN | IN | IN | OUT |
| 5 | Carly | IN | IN | IN | IN | IN | IN | IN | IN | IN | IN | IN | IN | OUT | |
| 6 | Zakir | IN | IN | IN | IN | IN | IN | IN | IN | IN | IN | IN | IN | OUT | |
| 7 | Felicia | IN | IN | IN | IN | IN | IN | IN | IN | IN | IN | IN | OUT | | |
| 8 | Hathwell | IN | IN | IN | IN | IN | IN | IN | IN | IN | IN | OUT | | | |
| 9 | Simon | IN | IN | IN | IN | IN | IN | IN | IN | IN | OUT | | | | |
| 10 | Virginia | IN | IN | IN | IN | IN | IN | IN | IN | IN | OUT | | | | |
| 11 | Alex | IN | IN | IN | IN | IN | IN | IN | IN | OUT | | | | | |
| 12 | Lexi | IN | IN | IN | IN | IN | IN | IN | IN | OUT | | | | | |
| 13 | Haley | IN | IN | IN | IN | IN | IN | OUT | | | | | | | |
| 14 | Bevarly | IN | IN | IN | IN | OUT | | | | | | | | | |
| 15 | Noah | IN | IN | IN | IN | OUT | | | | | | | | | |
| 16 | Kirk | IN | OUT | | | | | | | | | | | | |
| 17 | Vivian | IN | OUT | | | | | | | | | | | | |
| 18 | Symphony | OUT | | | | | | | | | | | | | |

The contestant won the challenge
The contestant was eliminated by other players
The contestant quit
The contestant was taken on a date by the challenge winner
The contestant was taken on a date by the challenge winner and was granted immunity
The contestant was forced to leave when she was arrested
The contestant left because she was impregnated
The contestant was eliminated when they lost the challenge
The contestant returned because the rule book states that everyone needed a partner
The contestant was voted by the other contestant as a member of the winning couple and chose the money over the relationship, therefore winning overall
The contestant was voted by the other contestant as a member of the winning couple and chose the relationship over the money, therefore losing out on the prize money

== Television ==
The first season of Burning Love had its worldwide television premiere on E! in Australia in January 2013 and E! in America on February 25, 2013. In Canada, the series premiered on Much; a sister to the local version of E!.

The first season premiered in the UK on Netflix in October 2013, edited into a 110-minute movie. The second season premiered on Australia's E! in February 2014, with the third season premiering on March 6, 2014.

== Home media and streaming ==
Season one was released on DVD on November 12, 2013. A year later, seasons two and three were released together as a two-disc set on September 16, 2014.

== International adaptation ==
A French version of the series premiered on October 12, 2020, on Canal+. Titled La Flamme (transl. The Flame), this version was created by Jérémie Galan, Florent Bernard and Jonathan Cohen, who also starred as the bachelor, Marc, in the first season. Ben Stiller is also one of the executive producers of this adaptation. The first season stars Leïla Bekhti, Adèle Exarchopoulos, Marie-Pierre Casey, Florence Foresti, Ana Girardot, Léonie Simaga, Géraldine Nakache, Camille Chamoux, Doria Tillier, Youssef Hajdi, Vincent Dedienne, Laure Calamy, Céline Salette, Angèle, Géraldine Nakache and Pierre Niney. On October 27, 2020, it was renewed for a second season titled Le Flambeau : Les Aventuriers de Chupacabra (transl. The Torch: The Adventurers of Chupacabra), a spoof of the French version of Survivor. It premiered on May 23, 2022.
