= Rob Huebel =

American actor and comedian

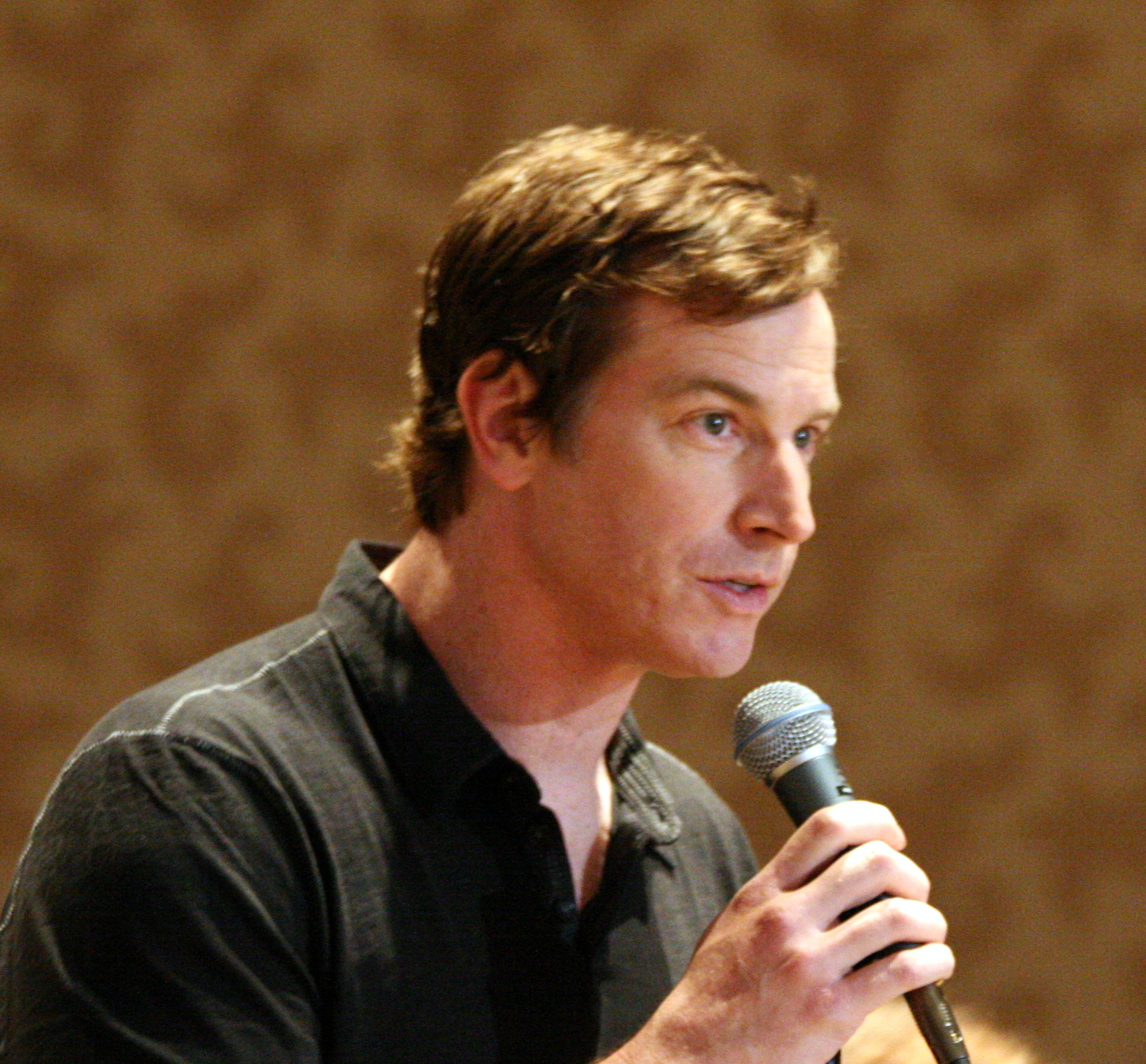
- Huebel in July 2012
- Born: Robert Anderson Huebel; June 4, 1969 (age 57); Alexandria, Virginia, U.S.
- Education: Clemson University (BA)
- Occupations: Comedian; actor
- Years active: 1998–present
- Spouse: Holly Hannula
- Children: 1
- Website: www.robhuebel.com

Robert Anderson Huebel (born June 4, 1969) is an American comedian and actor. He is best known for his sketch comedy work on the MTV series Human Giant and for his role of Dr. Owen Maestro on the Adult Swim series Childrens Hospital. He also appeared as Russell on the FX/FXX series The League and as Len Novak on the Amazon Prime Video series Transparent. In December 2022, Entertainment Weekly called Huebel "the premier d-bag character actor of his generation".

== Early life ==
Huebel was born in Alexandria, Virginia, the son of Louisa and Jared Huebel. He attended Annandale High School in Annandale, Virginia, before attending Clemson University, where he studied marketing in hopes of working in advertising. He later moved to New York and began studying improv comedy at the Upright Citizens Brigade Theater.

== Career ==
Huebel first began improvising when he was 27 by taking classes at the Upright Citizens Brigade Theatre in New York City.

His early work was as a sketch actor on shows such as Late Night with Conan O'Brien and Upright Citizens Brigade. He was nominated for an Emmy award for his work as a producer for Michael Moore's Bravo series The Awful Truth. He worked as a segment producer on The Daily Show with Jon Stewart.

Huebel was a panelist on the VH1 series Best Week Ever, part of the NetZero "Candidate Zero" campaign during the 2004 election. He also appeared on the HBO television series Curb Your Enthusiasm and Fox's Arrested Development.

The comedy partner of Rob Riggle (the two even auditioned for Saturday Night Live during its 30th season [2004–2005], but only Rob Riggle was picked and stayed on the show for a year), the duo have worked with the improvisational comedy troupe Respecto Montalban and at the Upright Citizens Brigade. Huebel and Riggle performed a comedy bit in the documentary Super High Me. Among their best-known work at UCB was their long-running two-man show Kung-Fu Grip, which was eventually showcased at the 2004 HBO Comedy Arts Festival. Huebel was in the movie Blackballed: The Bobby Dukes Story, as Sam Brown with Corddry, Scheer, and Riggle.

Huebel and fellow comedians Aziz Ansari and Paul Scheer are writers, actors, and executive producers in the MTV sketch comedy show Human Giant. Some of Huebel's characters from the show include Samir from "The Shutterbugs" and T.C. Everwood from "Clell Tickle". He guest starred in the 30 Rock episode "MILF Island", and also as Holly's boyfriend A.J. in three episodes of The Office. He played the role of Tevin in the 2009 comedy I Love You, Man. He also co-starred with Rob Corddry in Childrens Hospital.

Huebel continues to regularly perform at the Upright Citizens Brigade Theatre in Los Angeles. He co-hosts the live sketch show "Crash Test" with Paul Scheer twice a month, as well as hosting "The Shit Show", in which he gathers comedian friends and other well-known performers to present the worst scenes in films, television and commercials that they have ever done.

Huebel has written and starred in various filmed sketches for the HBO sketch comedy program Funny or Die Presents. In November 2010, he performed stand-up on The Benson Interruption on Comedy Central.

Huebel appeared in the films The Other Guys (2010), Life as We Know It, Little Fockers, Despicable Me, and The Descendants. In February 2011, he was cast as a lead in the Fox sitcom pilot Family Album and in May he guest starred on ABC's sitcom Modern Family as Glen Whipple in the episode "The One That Got Away". He also appeared in a recurring role on Amazon Studios's Transparent, playing Len Novak.

Huebel appears frequently on the comedy podcast Comedy Bang! Bang! along with starring in his own podcast series on the Earwolf network, Mike Detective. He later appeared in Horrible Bosses 2 (2014) and Barely Lethal (2015).

Huebel has starred as "Inconsiderate Cell-Phone Man" in several PSAs of this title, which are shown in movie theaters to discourage patrons from making calls during the picture.

== Personal life ==
Huebel is married to Holly Hannula. Their daughter, Holden, was born in 2016. She was born premature at 26 weeks and spent the first 117 days of her life in the Neonatal Intensive Care Unit.

== Filmography ==
=== Film ===
Year	Title	Role	Notes
2002	Bowling for Columbine	Corporate Criminal	Uncredited
2004	Blackballed: The Bobby Dukes Story	Sam Brown	
2004	Terrorists	Town Council Member	
2007	Norbit	Excited Man on TV	
2007	7-10 Split	Jerry Lowry	
2008	The Love Guru	Frat Guy	
2009	I Love You, Man	Tevin Downey	
2010	Despicable Me	Anchorman	Voice Cameo
2010	The Other Guys	Officer Watts	
2010	Life as We Know It	Ted	
2010	Orientation Day	Announcer	Voice, short film
2010	Little Fockers	Sleazy Doctor	
2011	Flypaper	Rex Newbauer	
2011	Natural Selection	Martin	
2011	The Descendants	Mark Mitchell	
2012	Celeste & Jesse Forever	Business Man	
2012	What to Expect When You're Expecting	Gabe	
2012	Seeking a Friend for the End of the World	Jeremy	
2012	It's Not You It's Me	Detective Archer	Short film
2013	Hell Baby	Mickey	
2013	Welcome to the Jungle	Phil	
2013	Rapture-Palooza	Morgan	
2014	Date and Switch	Pete	
2014	Horrible Bosses 2	Pinkberry Executive	
2014	A Better You	Coach	
2015	Barely Lethal	Mr. Marcus	
2015	Night Owls	Peter	
2016	Donald Trump's The Art of the Deal: The Movie	Le Club Boss	
2016	Miss Stevens	Walter	
2016	Keanu	Spencer	
2016	Cuddle Party	Drew	Short film
2017	Fun Mom Dinner	Andrew	
2017	How to Be a Latin Lover	Nick	
2017	Baywatch	Captain Don Thorpe	
2017	Izzy Gets the F*ck Across Town	Bennett	
2017	The House	Officer Chandler	
2019	International Falls	Tim	
2020	Valley Girl	Steve Richman	
2020	Have a Good Trip: Adventures in Psychedelics	Himself	
2020	Spontaneous	Charlie Carlyle	
2021	How It Ends	Joe	
2022	The Bob's Burgers Movie	Dizzy Dog Carnie	Voice Cameo
2022	Snow Day	Tom Brandston	
2023	You People	Producer	
2027	Romy and Michele 2	TBA	Filming

=== Television ===
Year	Title	Role	Notes
1998–1999	Upright Citizens Brigade	Various characters	3 episodes
2000	The Awful Truth		Producer; 12 episodes
2000–2001	The Daily Show		Field producer; 4 episodes
2004	McEnroe	Various characters	22 episodes
2005	Arrested Development	Dave Williams	Episode: "Righteous Brothers"
2005	The Showbiz Show with David Spade	Correspondent	
2005	Curb Your Enthusiasm	Dr. Mark	2 episodes
2007	Fat Guy Stuck In Internet	Morgan	2 episodes
2007–2008	Human Giant	Rob / Various characters	20 episodes; also creator, writer, and executive producer
2008	30 Rock	MILF Island Host	Episode: "MILF Island"
2008–2016	Childrens Hospital	Dr. Owen Maestro	79 episodes; also writer
2009	Reno 911!	HMO Advisor #1 / Resort Salesman #2 / Financial Advisor #1	3 episodes
2009	Michael & Michael Have Issues	Jeff	Episode: "Frogbox"
2009	Gary Unmarried	Howard Needleman	3 episodes
2009–2010	The Office	A.J.	3 episodes
2009–2015	The League	Russell / Dr. Deramo	10 episodes
2009–2019	American Dad!	Various voices	5 episodes
2010	Players	Todd	Episode: "Barb's Husband"
2010	Party Down	Mr. Dauntless	Episode: "Not on Your Wife Opening Night"
2010	Pretend Time	Bill	Episode: "Powdered Doughnuts Make Me Go Nuts"
2010	2010 MTV Movie Awards		Writer and segment producer
2010	CollegeHumor Originals	Brock	Episode: "Action Movie Pun Brainstorm"
2010–2011	Funny or Die Presents	Various characters	13 episodes; also writer and executive producer
2011	Traffic Light	Kev	4 episodes
2011	Happy Endings	Alan Fitzgerald	Episode: "You've Got Male"
2011	Modern Family	Glen Whipple	Episode: "The One That Got Away"
2012	The Life & Times of Tim	Matt	Voice, episode: "The Smug Chiropractor/Corporate Disaster"
2012	How I Met Your Mother	Wade Flanagan	Episode: "The Magician's Code"
2012	Up All Night	Jerry	2 episodes
2012	NTSF:SD:SUV::	Dragon Shumway	2 episodes; also writer
2012	17th Critics' Choice Awards	Co-host	Television special
2012	Key & Peele	Blue Falcon	Episode: "#2.9"
2012–2022	Bob's Burgers	Various characters	Voice, 12 episodes
2013	Burning Love	Simon	20 episodes
2013	Kroll Show	Suicidal Rockstar	Episode: "Ice Dating"
2013	Hart of Dixie	Michael Burgess	Episode: "I'm Moving On"
2013	Super Fun Night	Peter Crane	Episode: "Three Men and a Boubier"
2013	The ArScheerio Paul Show	Ultimate Warrior	Episode: "Ultimate Warrior"
2013–2015	Axe Cop	Gray Diamond	Voice, 16 episodes
2013–2015	Comedy Bang! Bang!	Dave Grigsby / Larry Jetski	2 episodes
2013–2015	Drunk History	Juan Francisco Treviño / Pat Garrett	2 episodes
2014	Agents of S.H.I.E.L.D.	Lloyd Rathman	Episode: "The Magical Place"
2014	Parks and Recreation	Harvey Spielyorm	Episode: "Galentine's Day"
2014	Garfunkel and Oates	Boomer	Voice, episode: "The Fadeaway"
2014	The Mindy Project	Andrew	2 episodes
2014	Newsreaders	Rob Huebel	Episode: "Motorboating Dads; the Negative $100,000 Question"
2014–2015	Marry Me	Wes	3 episodes
2014–2019	Transparent	Len Novak	28 episodes
2014–2022	The Goldbergs	John Calabasas	11 episodes
2015	Archer	Patrick (Crash) McCaren	Voice, episode: "The Archer Sanction"
2015	Last Week Tonight with John Oliver	Dad	Episode: "The Internet"
2015	Wet Hot American Summer: First Day of Camp	Brodfard Gilroy	Episode: "Auditions"
2015	Crash Test: With Rob Huebel and Paul Scheer	Rob	TV movie; also writer and executive producer
2015	The Hotwives of Las Vegas	Gynecologist	Episode: "Vaca-Shunned"
2015	Married	Jacob	Episode: "Triggers"
2016	Fresh Off the Boat	Rick	Episode: "Year of the Rat"
2016	Workaholics	Sam	Episode: "The Nuttin' Professor"
2016	Family Guy	Business Meeting Leader	Voice, episode: "Road to India"
2016	Blunt Talk	Dr. Rudy Kamper	2 episodes
2017	Drive Share	Various characters	6 episodes; also creator, writer, director, and executive producer
2017	Hawaii Five-0	Blake Stone	Episode: "Poniu I Ke Aloha"
2017	Angie Tribeca	Sperber Pennington	Episode: "This Sounds Unbelievable, but CSI: Miami Did It"
2017	Wet Hot American Summer: Ten Years Later	Brodfard Gilroy	2 episodes
2017	The Chris Gethard Show	Phone Sex Chewbacca	Episode: "Technology Will Destroy Us All"
2017–2019	Big Mouth	Mr. Lizer	Voice, 6 episodes
2017	Do You Want to See a Dead Body?	Himself	15 episodes; also creator, writer, and executive producer
2017	Brooklyn Nine-Nine	Landon Lawson	Episode: "Return to Skyfire"
2018	The Mayor	Don Viola	Episode: "The Pitch"
2018–2021	Black-ish	Gary	3 episodes
2019	I'm Sorry	Brad	Episode: "Barbara T. Warren"
2019	Unbreakable Kimmy Schmidt	Tad Frye	Episode: "Kimmy Finds a Liar!"
2019	We Bare Bears	Ranger Norm	Voice, episode: "Ranger Norm"
2019	Abby's	Clark	Episode: "Rosie's Band"
2019	Kids Say the Darndest Things	Himself	Episode: "Dad, Plug Your Ears!"
2020	Medical Police	Dr. Owen Maestro	10 episodes
2020	Schooled	John Calabasas	Episode: "Boy Bands"
2020	I Know This Much Is True	Leo	6 episodes
2020	Match Game	Himself	Episode: "Joel McHale, Amanda Seales, Ron Funches, Ana Gasteyer, Rob Huebel, Nikki Glaser"
2021–2024	The Sex Lives of College Girls	Mr. Murray	8 episodes; recurring role
2021	Master of None	Hudson	Voice, episode: "Moments in Love, Chapter 4"
2021	A Million Little Things	Xander Holmes	Episode: "No One Is to Blame"
2022	Murderville	Chadd Worthington / Charles Worthington / Chester Worthington	Episode: "Triplet Homicide"
2022	Ghosts	Ari (Present Day)	Episode: "Trevor's Pants"
2023	Goosebumps	Colin	
2024	Night Court	Pellino	Episode: "Hold the Pickles, Keep the Change"
2024	Grimsburg	Bertram (voice)	Episode: "The Flute Show"
2024	Knuckles	Dylan Beagleton	2 episodes
2025–2026	Running Point	Clint	3 episodes
2026	The Five-Star Weekend	Charlie Kirtley	Episode: "Friday: Arrivals"
2026	Life, Larry and the Pursuit of Unhappiness	Karl Mundt	Episode: "McCarthy"

=== Web series ===
Year	Title	Role	Notes
2017	Guest Grumps	Himself	Episode: "Scooby Doo Mystery Mayhem with Rob Huebel"
2017	Good Mythical Morning	Himself	Episode: "Stuff & Bluff Challenge ft Rob Huebel"
