= You're Whole =

American satirical television series created by Michael Ian Black

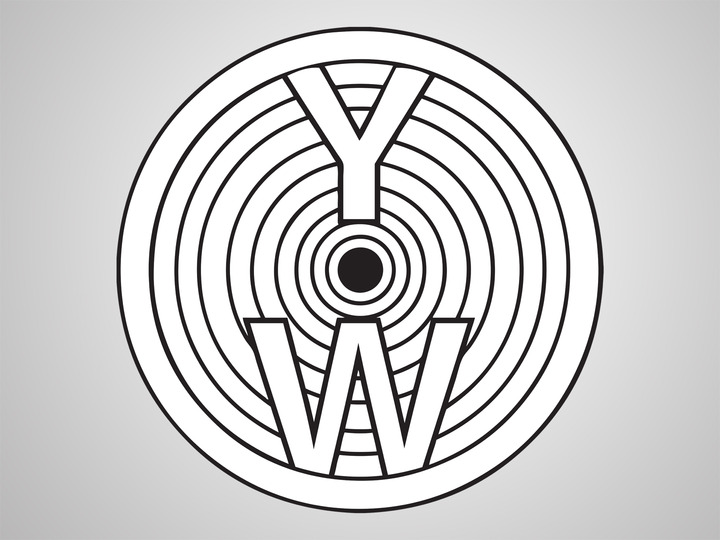
- Genre: Comedy; Satire
- Created by: Michael Ian Black
- Written by: Michael Ian Black
- Directed by: Michael Showalter
- Starring: Michael Ian Black; Cathy Shim
- Country of origin: United States
- Original language: English
- No. of seasons: 2
- No. of episodes: 8

Production
- Executive producers: Jonathan Stern; Michael Ian Black
- Producers: Franny Baldwin; David Soldinger
- Cinematography: Kevin Atkinson; Ron Egozi
- Running time: 11 minutes
- Production companies: Abominable Pictures; Williams Street

Original release
- Network: Adult Swim
- Release: November 5, 2012 – December 2, 2013

You're Whole is an American satirical television series created by Michael Ian Black for Adult Swim. The show parodies self-help infomercials and stars Black as the host, Randall Tyree Mandersohn. In it, Mandersohn advertises his systems of objects and actions designed to help people with their issues. It was the production of Abominable Pictures, with which Black originally consulted with the premise of the show in mind. Meanwhile, Michael Showalter, longtime collaborator of Black, served as the director.

The show originally ran from November 5, 2012 to December 2, 2013, airing two seasons (which are combined to one season on the Adult Swim Website) and totaling eight episodes. Both seasons were broadcast at 4:00 a.m. as part of DVR Theater on Adult Swim. On air, it was promoted as a series of genuine infomercials. Critical reception was positive, with many praising Black's performance. A live performance was held at the 2014 SF Sketchfest, also positively received.

== Synopsis and production ==
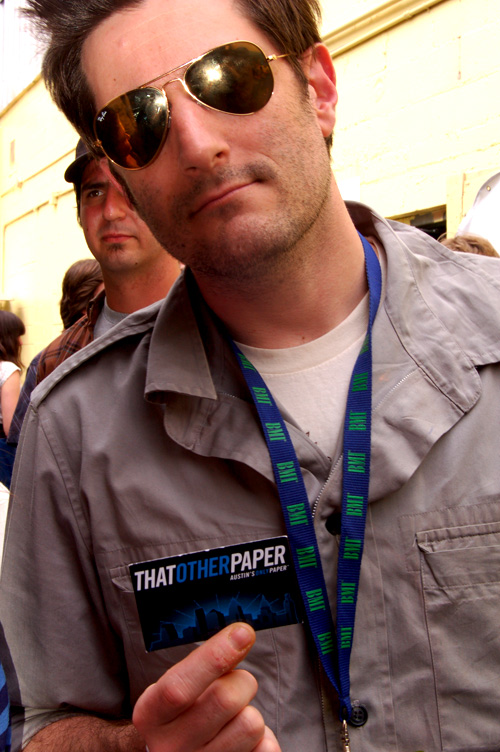
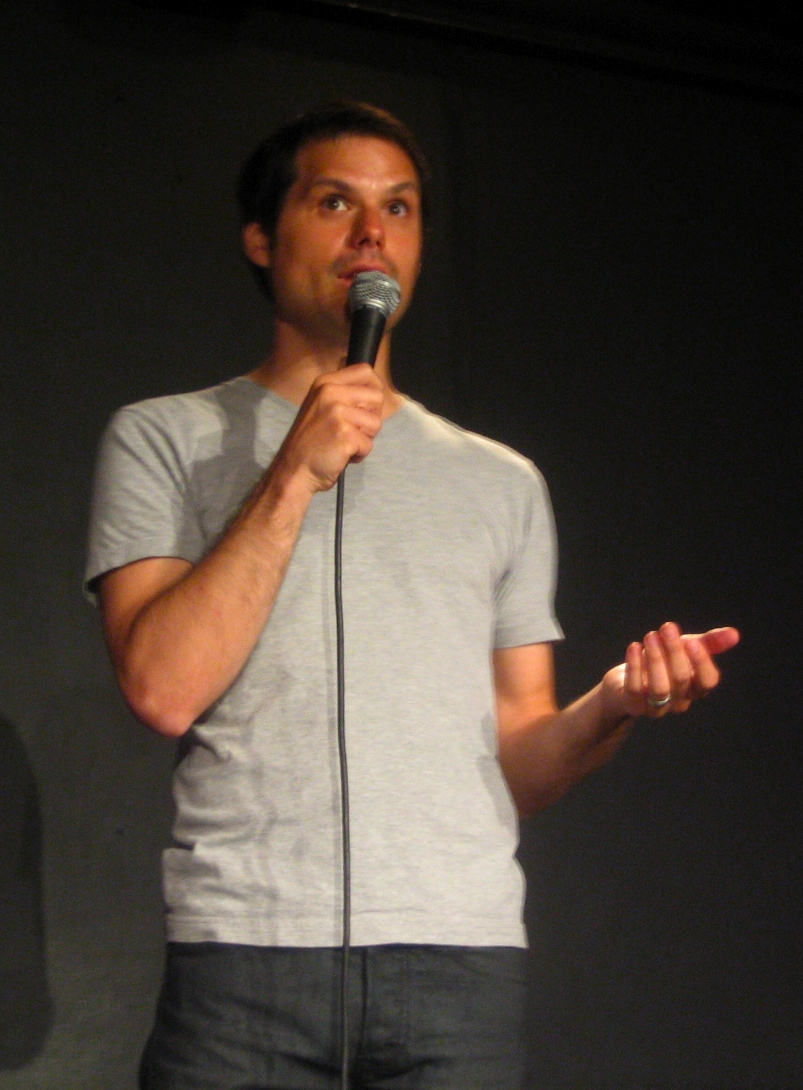
Show director Michael Showalter (left) is a frequent collaborator of creator Michael Ian Black (right).

You're Whole is presented as a parody of self-help infomercials. Each episode is advertised as part of a larger DVD set, consisting of 27 discs. The show features Michael Ian Black as the host, Randall Tyree Mandersohn: a "totally blind", volleyball-obsessed, self-help guru. Along with his wife, Pam (Cathy Shim), Mandersohn aims to help people using his bizarre, convoluted systems of objects and actions. The show was directed by Michael Showalter, a longtime collaborator of Black. Actor Crista Flanagan indicated that the second season was filmed as recently as August 2013.

In a June 2014 interview with the Detroit Metro Times, Black stated that no further seasons would be produced. Writing retrospectively the amount of research put into the show, Black stated that he "didn't spend a lot of time thinking about it", as it would have spoiled "some of the stupidity", joking that "I'm nothing if not stupid". Abominable Pictures producer David Soldinger later wrote that Black had come to the company with the idea in mind, and that, with their other parody infomercial Swords, Knives, Very Sharp Objects and Cutlery, "it was a happy marriage" between their company and Adult Swim.

=== Live performance ===
A live performance of the show was given at the 2014 SF Sketchfest on January 31. In addition to acting, Black and Showalter interlaced it with clips from the show. Art Siriwatt of The Daily Californian observed Showalter to be the "straight man" to Black's antics, with both frequently breaking character. He gave the performance a positive review, writing that "the result was a concise, lighthearted performance that was faithful to the show."

== Broadcast and reception ==
The show premiered on November 5, 2012 on Adult Swim; two seasons have been broadcast, totaling eight episodes. Advertised as a series of genuine infomercials, both seasons were broadcast at 4 a.m., as part of the network's DVR Theater block. The early-morning timeslot was chosen since infomercials usually air during such hours. The first episode was published on YouTube the day after its premiere. One critic—Eliot Glazer of Vulture—called the early morning time slot "terrible", directing readers toward online distribution. Although the show premiered during a graveyard slot in U.S. dayparting, nearly one million viewers (993,000) saw it on air. The second-season premiere marked a slight increase in viewers (996,000), while both maintained a Nielsen rating of 0.7.

Critical reception was positive, with many reviewers praising Black's performance and the satirizing of American self-help gurus, as conveyed through his casual racism and cultural appropriation of foreign rituals. Erik Adams of The A.V. Club found that the show conveys itself "in a manner familiar to anyone who's ever killed time before daylight by flipping through their cable package." Britt Hayes of ScreenCrush called the show "absolutely fantastic" and Black's portrayal "spot-on". Similarly, Aisha Harris of Slate wrote that Black's performance was "wonderfully committed", while the show "has pretty much every common trope of the self-help craze covered", citing the appropriation of foreign customs for Western audiences as "perhaps the most scathing treatment".

Meanwhile, Kelly West of Television Blend highlighted some of the more surreal systems, calling the diet in the premiere episode "a winner". For Splitsider, Bradford Evans dubbed the show "a more mainstream version" of Paid Programming, an unsuccessful pilot that was also pitched as a mock-infomercial. He found that starring Black, "recognizable as a comedic actor," would lead to its success, whereas the former preferred to use unknown actors instead.

== Episodes ==
Season	Episodes	Originally released	
Season	Episodes	First released	Last released
1	3	November 5, 2012	November 19, 2012
2	5	November 4, 2013	December 2, 2013

=== Season 1 (2012) ===
No. overall	No. in season	Title	Original release date	Prod. code	US viewers (millions)
1	1	"Smoothies/Pumpkins/Cookies"	November 5, 2012	101	0.993
Highlights include: the SPC diet—consisting of smoothies, pumpkins and cookies.
2	2	"Finger Puppets/Saxophone/Fish Tank"	November 12, 2012	102	0.803
Highlights include: Finger puppets, saxophones and fish tanks.
3	3	"Tools/Drawing Comics/Spin Class"	November 19, 2012	103	0.943
Highlights include: Working with tools, drawing comics, and "spin class".

=== Season 2 (2013) ===
No. overall	No. in season	Title	Original release date	Prod. code	US viewers (millions)
4	1	"Droppin' the 'G'/Ancient Egypt/Puffy Paints"	November 4, 2013	201	0.996
Highlights include: ancient Egypt and "puffy paints".
5	2	"Lemonade/Fishing/Cupcakes"	November 11, 2013	202	1.027
Highlights include: lemonade, fishing and cupcakes.
6	3	"Finding Love"	November 18, 2013	203	0.829
Randall demonstrates how to find true love using his "Use the Tongue" method.
7	4	"Attitude"	November 25, 2013	204	0.903
Randall addresses the topic of attitude, instructing his audience to walk like panthers while adding "SPiCE" to his "revolutionary" eating system.
8	5	"Propofol/Telescopes/Abraham Lincoln"	December 2, 2013	205	1.057
Highlights include: propofol, telescopes and Abraham Lincoln.
