= Rob Corddry =

American actor and comedian (born 1971)

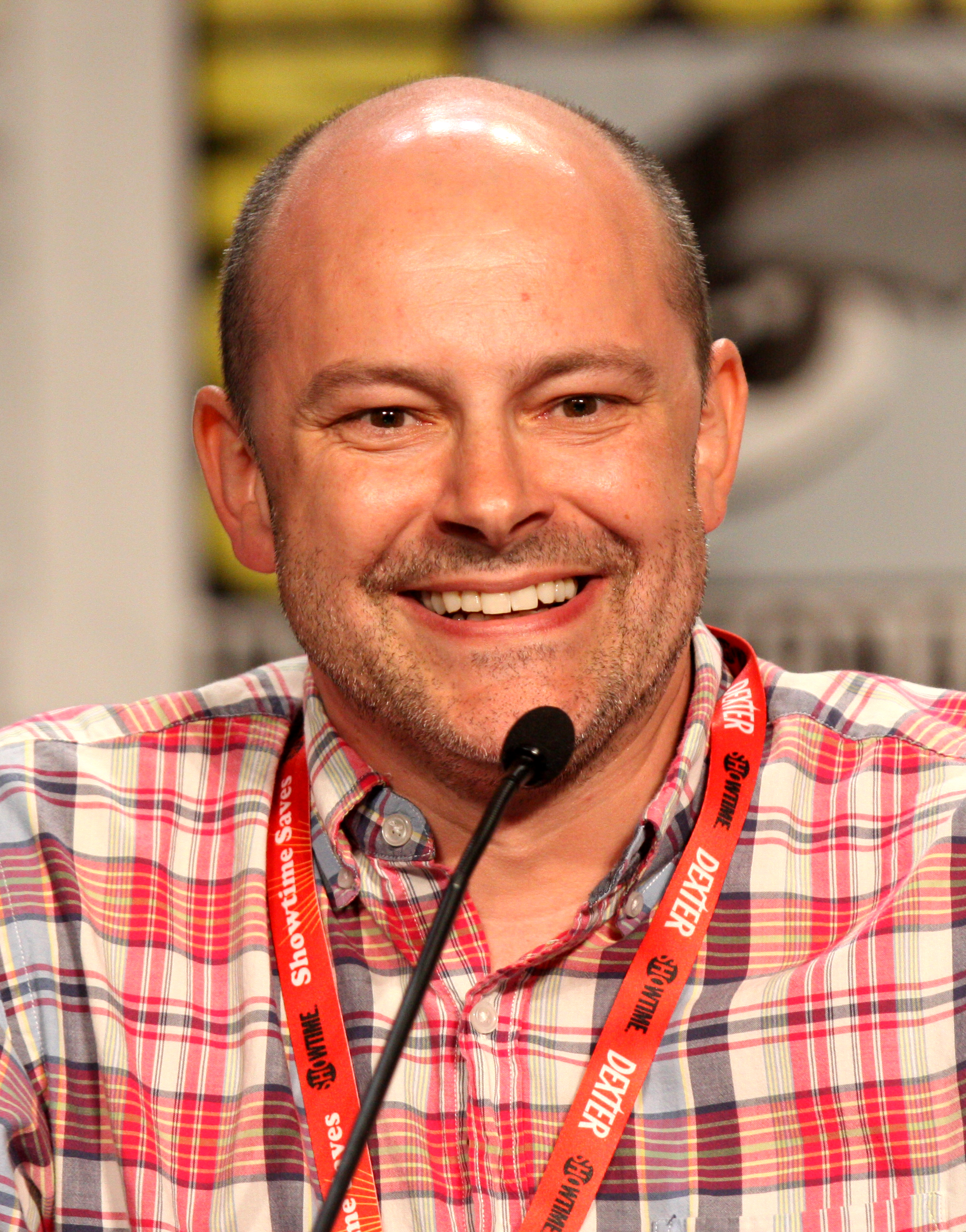
- Corddry at the 2011 San Diego Comic-Con
- Born: Robert William Corddry; February 4, 1971 (age 55); Weymouth, Massachusetts, U.S.
- Education: University of Massachusetts Amherst (BA)
- Occupations: Actor, comedian
- Years active: 1998–present
- Spouse: Sandra Corddry (m. 2002)
- Children: 2
- Relatives: Nate Corddry (brother)

Robert William Corddry (born February 4, 1971) is an American actor and comedian. He is known for his work as a correspondent on The Daily Show with Jon Stewart (2002–2006) and for his starring role in the film Hot Tub Time Machine. He is the creator and star of Adult Swim's Childrens Hospital and has been awarded four Primetime Emmy Awards. He previously starred in the HBO series Ballers and the CBS comedy The Unicorn.

== Early life and education ==
Corddry was born and raised in Weymouth, Massachusetts. His parents are Robin (née Sullivan) and Steven Corddry, who was a Massachusetts Port Authority official. He is the older brother of actor Nate Corddry. Corddry and his brother are both Eagle Scouts from Troop 19, located in Weymouth.

After graduating from Weymouth North High School (1989), Corddry went to the University of Massachusetts Amherst (1989–93). According to an interview in the UMass Amherst alumni magazine, Corddry initially planned to major in journalism but changed his major to English. By his second year, he focused much of his attention on Drama classes and plays including Torch Song Trilogy, Ten Little Indians, Cat on a Hot Tin Roof, Romeo and Juliet, and Reckless. While at UMass, Corddry pledged the Theta chapter of Theta Chi fraternity.

In January 1994, Corddry moved to New York City. His early paying jobs included working as a security guard at The Metropolitan Museum of Art and handing out menus for a Mexican restaurant. He eventually landed acting jobs, including a year-long tour with the National Shakespeare Company.

Corddry trained in improv at the Upright Citizens Brigade Theatre in New York City and performed regularly as a member of the sketch comedy group "The Naked Babies" (with John Ross Bowie, Brian Huskey, and Seth Morris). The group appeared at the 1999 Big Stinkin' International Improv & Sketch Comedy Festival in Austin, Texas. Corddry also spent two years with the sketch comedy group "Third Rail Comedy". His first notable television appearances were on Comedy Central's Upright Citizens Brigade (1998–2000).

== Career ==
=== The Daily Show ===
In spring 2002, he accepted an audition for The Daily Show. His pieces for The Daily Show frequently included references to Boston, Massachusetts, which he considers to be his hometown. On October 4, 2005, his younger brother Nate Corddry made his first appearance as a Daily Show correspondent. On January 12, 2006, Corddry's wife Sandra appeared with him on a Daily Show segment; they welcomed their first child, daughter Sloane Sullivan Corddry, on July 3, 2006. On February 9, 2006 Corddry hosted an episode of The Daily Show due to the absence of Jon Stewart (jokingly because the show's regular host was "in the shop", but in fact because of the birth of Stewart's second child).

On August 15, 2006, Corddry said "I've got like a week and a half left, all bets are off", and then on August 21, 2006, Stewart remarked that Corddry's last day on The Daily Show would be August 24, 2006. Corddry appeared throughout the week, once filing a report from inside a toilet bowl supposedly on board an aircraft transporting John Mark Karr, and another dressed up in a 1970s fashion; Stewart remarked, "It's his last week, and really, we're trying to come up with terrible things for him to have to do."

During that last show on August 24, Corddry aired a self-produced tribute to his four years on the show, going out, as Stewart said, with a "poop joke".

Stewart: That was a very fitting tribute, Rob. We're gonna miss you on the show.
Corddry: Why thank you, Jon. But wherever I go and whatever I do, there'll always be a part of me here.
Stewart: Wow...that's a really sweet thing to say.
Corddry: No no no, I'm not kidding. It's in the second floor men's room, actually. That's what you get for not giving me a proper send off.
Stewart: You're really gonna go out on a poop joke?
Corddry: I have to stay true to myself, Jon.

Corddry cites Stewart as a profound influence on his comedy, crediting Stewart for teaching him how to focus on an idea in order to find the humor in it, and says that his The Daily Show pedigree earned him the clout to make Childrens Hospital.

Among the projects Corddry worked on after leaving The Daily Show was The Winner, a 2007 TV series.

Corddry has since made appearances on the show, both as a guest and as a correspondent.

=== Film roles ===
Corddry played the title character in Blackballed: The Bobby Dukes Story (2004) and Mac, Ben Stiller's character's best friend in The Heartbreak Kid. He has also made appearances in Old School (2003, credited as Robert Corddry), Blades of Glory, Semi-Pro, I Now Pronounce You Chuck and Larry, Failure to Launch and The Ten.

He also appeared in Harold & Kumar Escape from Guantanamo Bay as Ron Fox, a very racist Deputy Secretary of the United States Department of Homeland Security, in W. as Ari Fleischer, and also in What Happens in Vegas. In 2010, he co-starred in the John Cusack film Hot Tub Time Machine and in 2013 he co-starred in Jonathan Levine's Warm Bodies as the zombie M. That same year Corddry made a debut lead voice role as protagonist and head of mission control, Gary Supernova, in the 2013 animated sci-fi comedy Escape from Planet Earth alongside his Hot Tub Time Machine co-star Craig Robinson. Also in 2013 Corddry played Moe in In a World..., a film directed by Lake Bell.

=== Other work ===
Corddry hosted the 10th annual Webby Awards ceremony on June 12, 2006. He starred as the main character in the Fox mid-season comedy The Winner from March 4, 2007 until the series' cancellation. He described the show to Stuff Magazine as "sort of like a fucked-up Wonder Years."

Corddry has appeared in a Curb Your Enthusiasm episode entitled "The Seder" as a sex offender who moves into Larry David's neighborhood. He also appeared in two episodes of Fox's Arrested Development as Moses Taylor, an actor who plays "Frank Wrench", an obsessively by-the-books detective on a fictional television series Wrench. Corddry has also done some voice work as Gordon the animated Devil on Cartoon Network's Weighty Decisions (alongside fellow Daily Show correspondent Ed Helms). He also appeared in a commercial for Cartoon Network's Ed, Edd n Eddy series and a 2001 promotional ad as an anger management therapist to the Townsville Villains of the cartoon series The Powerpuff Girls.

Corddry's voice appears in the History Channel production World War II in HD. He is the voice of World War II soldier and jazz musician Roscoe "Rockie" Blunt.

Corddry wrote, directed, and starred in the web series Childrens Hospital for The WB on its online network at TheWB.com. After talks fell through with Comedy Central, Turner's Adult Swim picked up the series and began airing new episodes August 22, 2010.

On March 29, 2010, he was a co-guest host of WWE Raw with fellow cast member Clark Duke from Hot Tub Time Machine.

Corddry played an important role in proliferating Justin Halpern's Twitter account Shit My Dad Says. An early enthusiast of the quotes made by Halpern's father, Corddry tweeted a link to Shit My Dad Says which "jump-started" the phenomenon, helping expose Halpern's Twitter feed to a larger audience.

Corddry also has starred in three commercials for the Holiday Inn in both 2010 and 2011. He appeared in three episodes of Community playing a lawyer, Alan Connor, an old acquaintance of Jeff Winger, who was also a lawyer.

In August 2011, Corddry appeared on episode 29 of the podcast Back to Work, distributed by the 5by5 podcast network, where he was interviewed by Merlin Mann about his writing and acting career.

In 2012, Corddry began a recurring role on the third season of Happy Endings, playing "The Car Czar", Jane's new boss at the car dealership. He also had a recurring role on the short-lived FOX series Ben and Kate, as Buddy, the boorish owner of the bar where Kate and BJ work, also BJ's on-and-off boyfriend.

As recently as October 2013, Corddry appeared again as a recurring guest on The Jason Ellis Show. A talk show featured exclusively on SiriusXm Satellite Radio, Corddry accepted an invitation to host his own show airing on the soon to be launched "Jason Ellis Channel".

From 2015 to 2019, he starred in the HBO comedy-drama series Ballers.

He was the subject of episode #16, titled "Rob," of the podcast Heavyweight by Jonathan Goldstein.

On December 3, 2019, it was revealed that Corddry would be a host of the revived Top Gear America, which debuted on Motor Trend in January 2021.

Corddry has also appeared in the HBO Max series Bookie.

== Filmography ==
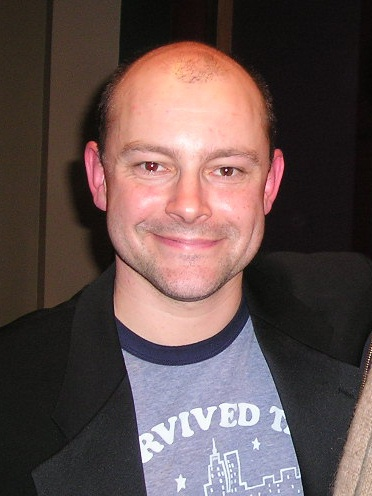
Corddry after speaking at Brown University on December 9, 2005

=== Film ===
Rob Corddry film work
Year	Title	Role	Notes
2003	Old School	Warren	
2004	Blackballed: The Bobby Dukes Story	Bobby Dukes	
2006	Wedding Daze	Kyle	
2006	Unaccompanied Minors	Sam Davenport	
2006	Failure to Launch	Gun Salesman	
2006	Arthur and the Invisibles	Seides	Voice
2007	The Ten	Duane Rosenblum	
2007	The Heartbreak Kid	Mac	
2007	I Now Pronounce You Chuck and Larry	Jim The Protester	
2007	Blades of Glory	Bryce	
2008	What Happens in Vegas	Jeff "Hater" Lewis	
2008	W.	Ari Fleischer	
2008	Semi-Pro	Kyle	
2008	Lower Learning	Principal Harper Billings	
2008	Harold & Kumar Escape from Guantanamo Bay	Ron Fox	
2009	The Winning Season	Terry	
2009	Taking Chances	Mayor Cleveland Fishback	
2010	Hot Tub Time Machine	Lou Dorchen	
2010	Operation: Endgame	Chariot	
2010	Megamind	Metro City Citizen	Uncredited voice cameo
2011	Cedar Rapids	Gary	
2011	Butter	Ethan Emmett	
2012	Seeking a Friend for the End of the World	Warren	
2013	Hell Baby	Jack	
2013	Escape from Planet Earth	Gary Supernova	Voice
2013	Warm Bodies	M / Marcus	
2013	In a World...	Moe	
2013	Pain & Gain	John Mese	
2013	Rapture-Palooza	Mr. Walt House	
2013	The Way, Way Back	Kip	
2014	Jason Nash Is Married	Dan Morrison	
2014	Muppets Most Wanted	First AD	
2014	Sex Tape	Robby Thompson	
2015	Hot Tub Time Machine 2	Lou Dorchen	
2015	Ricked Wicky: Poor Substitute	Himself	Music Video
2016	Office Christmas Party	Jeremy Parker	
2017	How to Be a Latin Lover	Quincy	
2017	Shimmer Lake	Kurt Biltmore	
2017	The Layover	Principal Stan Moss	
2018	Dog Days	Kurt	
2019	Benjamin	Dr. Ed	
2020	Bad Therapy	Bob Howard	
2020	Have a Good Trip: Adventures in Psychedelics	Himself	
2023	80 for Brady	Pat	
2023	The Donor Party	Geoff	
2023	The Senior	Sam Weston	
2024	Waltzing with Brando	Jack Bellin	
2026	The Second Coming of John Cooper	Himself	
2026	Bad Day		Post-production
2026	An Innocent Girl		Filming

=== Television ===
Rob Corddry television work
Year	Title	Role	Notes
1998–2000	Upright Citizens Brigade	Various	6 episodes
2002–2006; 2025	The Daily Show	Correspondent	249 episodes
2004	O'Grady	The Bob	Voice; Episode: "Vacation"
2005	Sunday Pants	Gordon the Devil	Voice; "Weighty Decisions" segments
2005–2017	American Dad!	Various voices	3 episodes
2006	Curb Your Enthusiasm	Rick Leftowitz	Episode: "The Seder"
2006	Arrested Development	Moses Taylor	2 episodes
2007	MADtv	Johnny	1 episode
2007	The Winner	Glen Abbott	6 episodes
2008–2016	Childrens Hospital	Dr. Blake Downs, Cutter Spindell, Rory Spindell	77 episodes; also creator, director, writer and executive producer
2008	The Mighty B!	Doctor, Vet	Voices; Episode: "Bee Patient"
2009	Party Down	Gary	Episode: "Brandix Corporate Retreat"
2009	Law & Order	Jim Leary	Episode: "Human Flesh Search Engine"
2010–2014	Community	Alan Connor	3 episodes
2011	Little in Common	Dennis Weller	Pilot
2011	Running Wilde	Jack Gray	Episode: "Jack's Back"
2011	Glenn Martin, DDS	Randy	Voice; Episode: "Videogame Wizard"
2011	The Life & Times of Tim	Sausage Salesman	Voice; Episode: "The Sausage Salesman"
2012	Family Guy	Ben Jennings	Voice; Episode: "Livin' on a Prayer"
2012–2013	Happy Endings	Lon "The Car Czar" Sarofsky	3 episodes
2012	NTSF:SD:SUV::	Agent Coyote Daniels	Episode: "Robot Town"
2012–2013	Ben and Kate	Buddy	3 episodes
2013	Spy	Tim	Pilot
2013	Burning Love	Lorenzo Blimperson	Episode: "Puppet Show"
2013–2015	Newsreaders	—N/a	Co-creator, writer and executive producer
2014	Trophy Wife	Sensei Rick	Episode: "Foxed Lunch"
2014	Hawaii Five-0	Tony Gibson	Episode: "Ho'i Hou"
2014	Robot Chicken	Various Voices	2 episodes
2014	Comedy Bang! Bang!	Himself	Episode: "Rob Corddry Wears Tan Dress Shoes & Red Socks"
2015–2019	Ballers	Joe Krutel	Series regular; 47 episodes
2016	Teachers	Sam	Episode: "Hall of Shame"
2016	Animals	Earring	Episode: "Rats"
2016	Workaholics	Eric	Episode: "The Nuttin' Professor"
2016–2018	Speechless	Billy DiMeo	3 episodes
2016	Mr. Neighbor's House	—N/a	Television special; executive producer
2017–2018	Drunk History	George Washington, Joseph A. Califano Jr.	2 episodes
2017–2024	Last Week Tonight with John Oliver	Various	4 episodes
2017	Do You Want to See a Dead Body?	Himself	Episode: "A Body and a Mean Dog"
2018	Wrecked	Himself	Episode: "Ballers"
2019	Ryan Hansen Solves Crimes on Television	Himself	Episode: "For Your Inconsideration"
2019	American Princess	Bacon	Episode: "Down There"
2019	What Just Happened??! with Fred Savage	Himself	Episode: "Family"
2019	Bajillion Dollar Propertie$	Inspector Suggs	Episode: "Good Todd Hunting"
2019–2021	The Unicorn	Forrest	Series regular
2020	Medical Police	Blake Downs	2 episodes; also creator, writer, executive producer
2020	Dummy	Phil Goldman	Episode: "Passive Protagonist"
2020–2021	Crossing Swords	The Old King	Voice; 5 episodes
2021–2022	Top Gear America	Himself / Host	21 episodes
2022	Physical	Gary	Episode: "Don't You Go Far"
2023	History of the World, Part II	Vladimir Lenin	2 episodes
2023	The Goldbergs	George Myerson	Episode: "Bev to the Future"
2023	This Fool	Sergeant	2 episodes
2023–2025	Bookie	Walt Dinty	10 episodes
2024	Not Dead Yet	Andrew Michaels	Episode: "Not Solved Yet"
2024	Hit-Monkey	Buddy	Voice; 5 episodes
2026	The Audacity	Tom Ruffage	
2026	Robot Chicken Adult Swim Special	Dr. Blake Downs, Adult Swim AI Robot	Voice; Television Special

=== Video games ===
Rob Corddry video game work
Year	Title	Role
2010	Fallout: New Vegas	Billy Knight

=== Music videos ===
- Ben Folds Five's "Do It Anyway" (2012): Plays sound engineer
- The Mountain Goats "The Legend of Chavo Guerrero" (2015): Plays interviewer

== Awards and honors ==
In 2009, Corddry was nominated for a Streamy Award Best Writing for a Comedy Web Series for Children's Hospital; in 2011, it won Best Sketch/Alternative Comedy in the first annual Comedy Awards.
