= Malin Akerman =

Swedish and American actress (born 1978)

Malin Åkerman
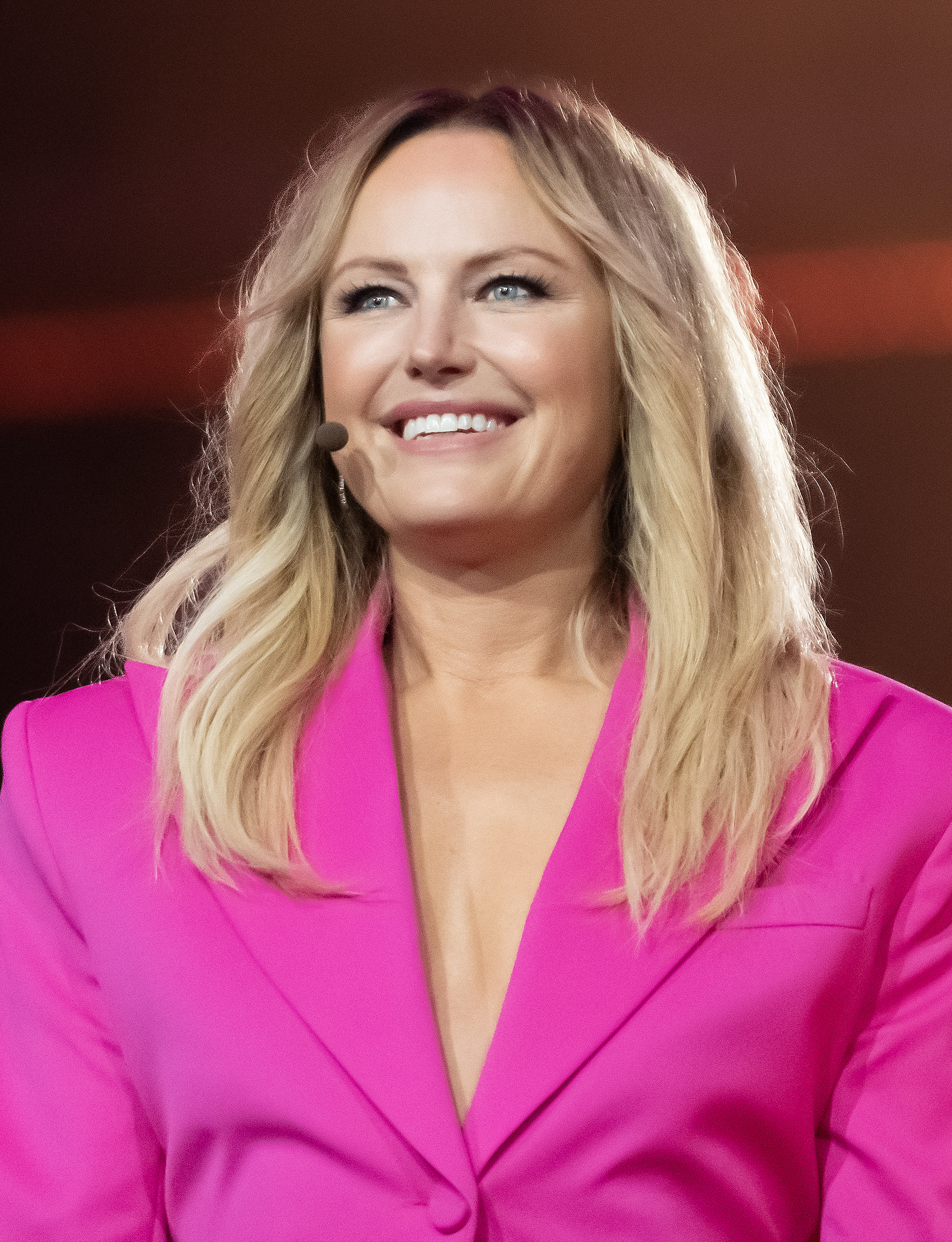
- Akerman in 2024
- Born: Malin Maria Åkerman; 12 May 1978 (age 48); Stockholm, Sweden
- Citizenship: Sweden; United States (since 2018)
- Occupation: Actress
- Years active: 1996–present
- Spouses: Roberto Zincone (m. 2007; div. 2014) Jack Donnelly (m. 2018)
- Children: 1
- Relatives: Jennifer Åkerman (half-sister)

Malin Maria Åkerman (Note: Swedish pronunciation: [ˈmɑ̌ːlɪn ˈôːkɛrˌman]. Although she is widely recognized as 'Malin Akerman', the original 'Åkerman' spelling with the letter Å is retained in Sweden and Swedish-language media.) (born 12 May 1978), often anglicised to Malin Akerman, (Note: English pronunciation: /ˈmɑːlɪn ˈækərmæn/ MAH-lin AK-ər-man.) is a Swedish and American actress. She first appeared in smaller parts in both Canadian and American productions, including The Utopian Society (2003) and Harold & Kumar Go to White Castle (2004). Following a main role on the HBO mockumentary series The Comeback (2005), Akerman co-starred in the commercially successful romantic comedies The Heartbreak Kid (2007) and 27 Dresses (2008). She gained wider recognition for her role as Silk Spectre II in the 2009 superhero film Watchmen, for which she received a Saturn Award nomination for Best Supporting Actress.

She had supporting and starring roles in the box office hits The Proposal (2009), Couples Retreat (2009), and Rampage (2018). Her performance in the comedy horror film The Final Girls (2015) garnered a Fangoria Chainsaw Award nomination. Akerman's other works include the critically acclaimed dramas I'll See You in My Dreams (2015) and To the Stars (2019). On television, she earned critical praise for her lead role on the ABC sitcom Trophy Wife (2013–2014). She was part of the main cast on the Adult Swim comedy series Childrens Hospital from 2010 to 2016, the Showtime drama series Billions from 2016 to 2019, and the Netflix drama series The Hunting Wives from 2025 onward.

Apart from acting and modelling, Akerman had a brief music career in the early 2000s as the lead vocalist for alternative rock band the Petalstones, which released its debut studio album in 2005. She subsequently left the project to focus on her acting career. She has been married twice, first from 2007 to 2014 to Petalstones drummer Roberto Zincone, with whom she has a son, and, since 2018, to English actor Jack Donnelly. Akerman hosted the Eurovision Song Contest 2024 in Malmö alongside Petra Mede.

== Early life and education ==
Akerman was born in Stockholm on 12 May 1978, the daughter of aerobics teacher and part-time model Pia (née Sundström) and insurance broker Magnus Åkerman. When she was two, the family moved to Canada when her father was offered a job there. Four years later her parents divorced and her father moved back to Sweden. Both parents remarried, giving Akerman one half-brother and two half-sisters, including Jennifer Åkerman. After her mother remarried, they moved to Niagara-on-the-Lake, Ontario. Her mother divorced again in Akerman's teenage years. She attended many different schools, including Sir Winston Churchill Secondary School in St. Catharines, Ontario. She visited her father in Falsterbo during school breaks and talked to him regularly on the phone. She cites her parents as "supportive, positive influences" in her life. She was raised as a Buddhist.

In her youth Akerman competed professionally in figure skating for ten years. Her mother introduced her to modelling while she was still in primary school. At age 16, she was discovered by Ford Models at the Pen Centre shopping mall in St. Catharines. She was signed to the agency and later won a contract with skincare company Noxzema. She soon moved to Toronto while attending North Toronto Collegiate Institute and later Dante Alighieri Academy. At the age of 18, inspired by the "helplessness" she sometimes felt during her childhood, she decided to become a child psychologist. She supported her education by modelling for television commercials and catalogue layouts. While studying for a year at York University in Toronto, she was simultaneously offered guest roles on television as a result of her exposure in commercials. She saw the acting roles as further opportunities to pay for her education but found herself enjoying acting, and later dropped out of school to become an actress. She moved to Los Angeles in 2001 to pursue acting full time.

== Career ==
=== Early roles (1997–2008) ===
Akerman made her acting debut on the Canadian science fiction series Earth: Final Conflict in 1997 in a smaller role as a robot. She originally landed a role on an MTV pilot with Rachel McAdams but the project was never picked up by the network. In 2000, she guest starred on Relic Hunter and had a smaller role in the American film The Skulls. The following year she made appearances on the series Doc, Twice in a Lifetime and Witchblade. In 2001 she moved to Los Angeles, California, in hopes of pursuing a broader acting career. At first, she worked as a waitress and stayed at a friend's house. In 2002 she received a role in the film The Utopian Society. The film was edited by Francesco Sondelli, guitarist for alternative rock band Ozono. Sondelli asked Akerman to help the band with song lyrics and later asked her to sing. Akerman subsequently became the band's singer, and they changed their name to the Petalstones. The band's debut album Stung was released in August 2005, but she eventually left to focus on her acting career. She described her singing as "sort of a self-made, self-taught, if-you-can't-hit-the-note-scream-it kind of thing".

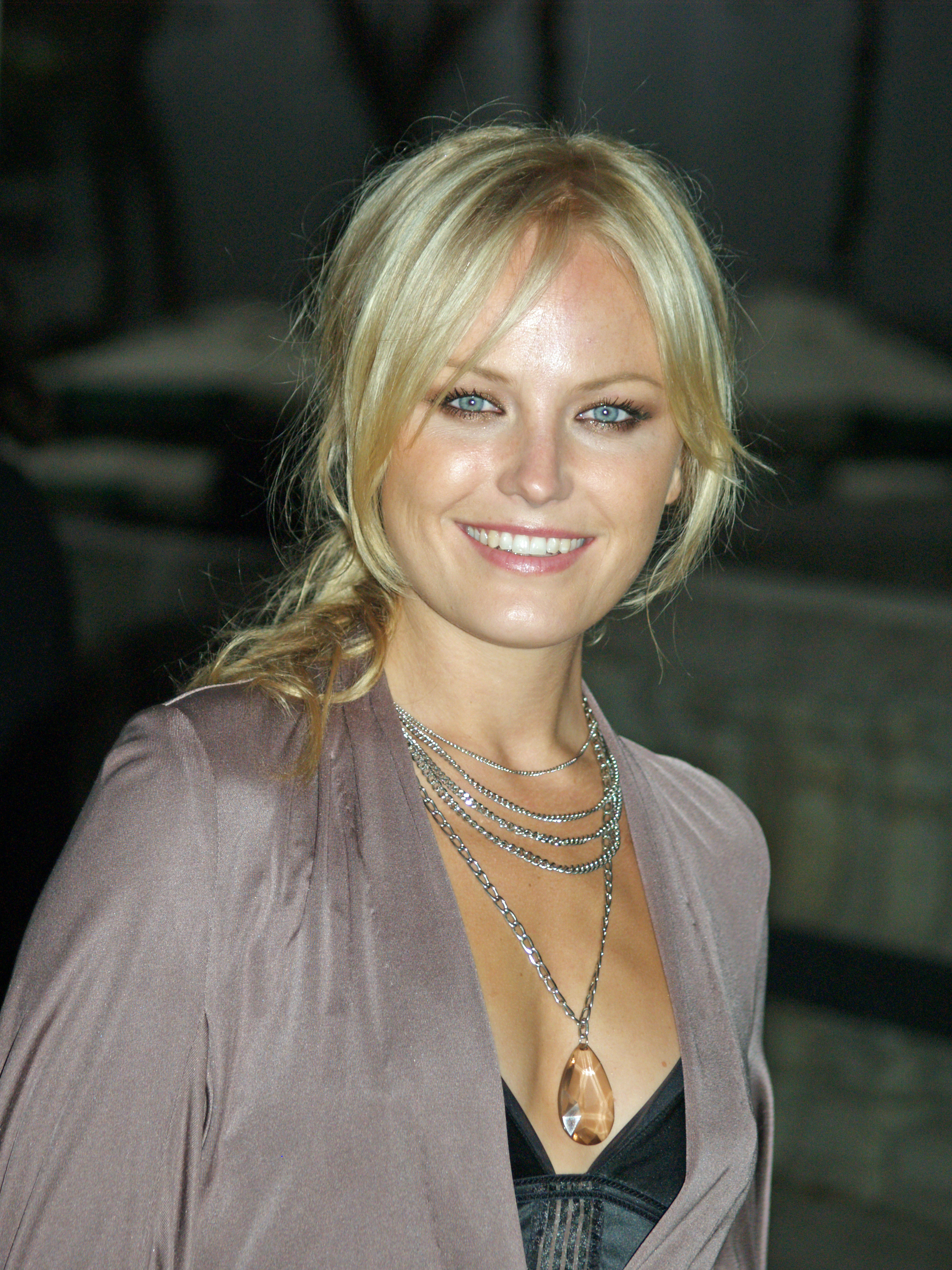
Akerman at New York Fashion Week, September 2008

In 2004, she got a small role in the film Harold & Kumar Go to White Castle, but considered moving back to Canada as most of her auditions failed. She was then cast in a main role as Juna on the HBO television series The Comeback (2005), with Lisa Kudrow in the lead role. Kudrow played a former sitcom star who tried to restart her career. Akerman's appearance on the show garnered media attention and resulted in her being offered more roles. A year later, she guest starred on an episode of Love Monkey and two episodes of Entourage. Before the Entourage episodes aired, she landed a role in the 2007 comedy film The Brothers Solomon. The film was a box office bomb and received largely critical reviews. The same year, she also appeared in the films The Invasion, for which she was uncredited, and Heavy Petting.

Akerman signed up for a role alongside Ben Stiller in the comedy film The Heartbreak Kid, directed by the Farrelly Brothers, in 2006. She played Lila, the newly wedded wife of Stiller's character. The film follows the couple's honeymoon in Mexico, where Stiller's character falls in love with another woman and realizes that the marriage was a mistake. A remake of the 1972 film of the same title, it was released in October 2007 to generally poor reviews, as critics deemed it "neither as daring nor as funny" as the directors' earlier films. Akerman's performance garnered more positive reviews; Desson Thomson of The Washington Post called her a "fabulous comic partner" to Stiller, while Roger Moore of Times Herald-Record asserted that she had outperformed him. The film grossed US$14 million in its opening weekend in the United States, and went on to gross US$127 million globally.

In 2007, Akerman joined the cast of 27 Dresses, a romantic comedy film directed by Anne Fletcher with Katherine Heigl in the lead role. The film follows Heigl's character Jane, who has always been the bridesmaid and dreams of her own wedding. Akerman played Jane's sister Tess. The film was shot during the summer of 2007, and was released in January 2008 to weak critical reception as it was considered "clichéd and mostly forgettable". The film was more successful commercially, with a gross of US$160 million. Akerman played the title role in Bye Bye Sally, a short film directed by Paul Leyden and based on Lisa Mannetti's short story Everybody Wins. The film premiered at the 2009 Newport Beach Film Festival.

=== Breakthrough with Watchmen (2009–2011) ===
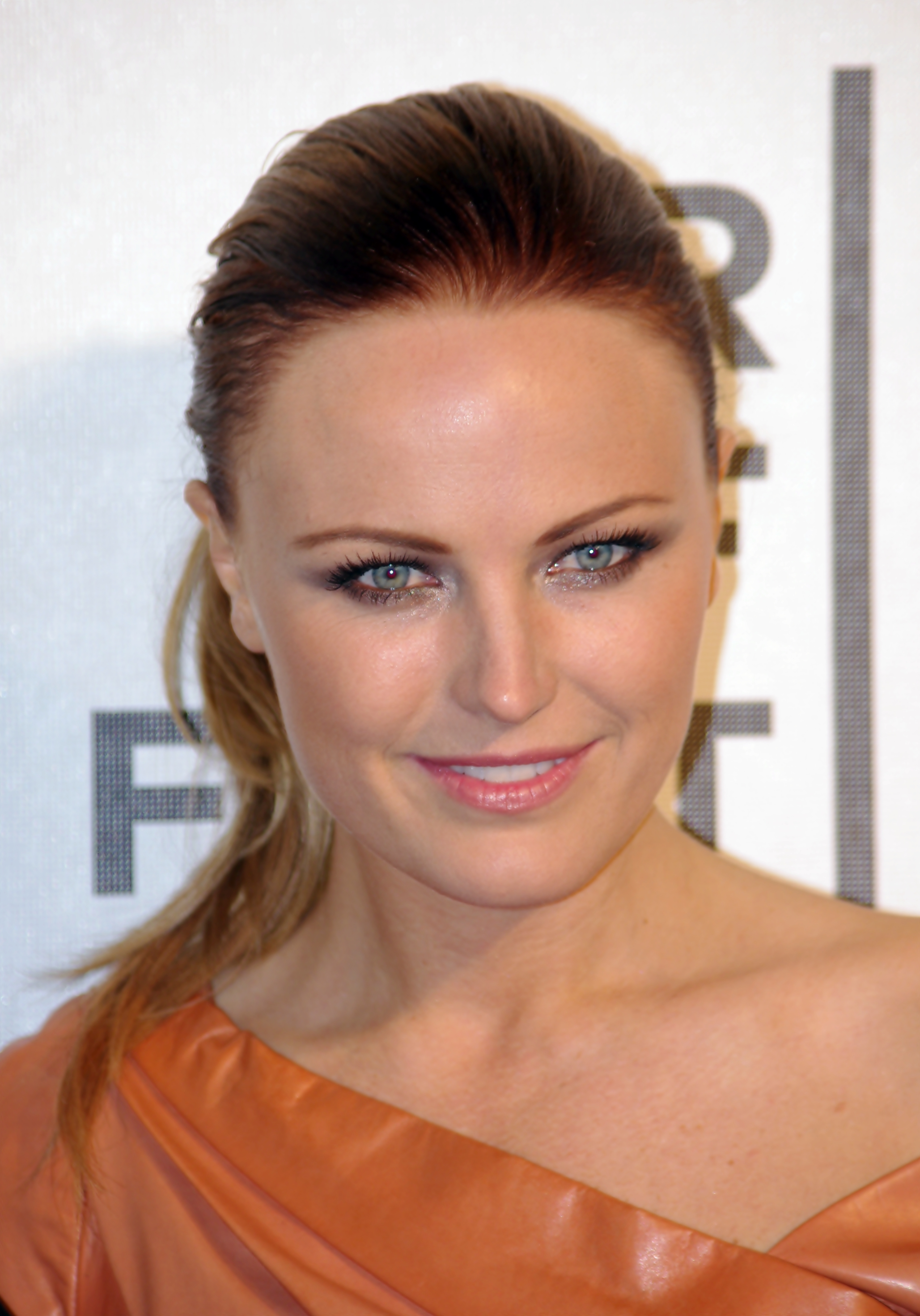
Akerman at the premiere of The Bang Bang Club, April 2011

In 2009, Akerman starred as Silk Spectre II in the superhero film Watchmen, an adaptation of Alan Moore's graphic novel of the same name. Directed by Zack Snyder, the feature film is set in an alternate reality in 1985 where a group of retired vigilantes investigate an apparent conspiracy against them. Snyder favoured Akerman over other more well-known actresses as he felt that they could not play such a serious part. Akerman rehearsed with "months of hardcore training" and went on a very strict diet. She wore a brunette wig, high heels and an uncomfortable latex costume, which provided little protection when performing stunts, and she often bruised herself during filming. Akerman stated that her character carries the emotion of the film as she is the only woman among several men. Premiering in February 2009, the film received generally favourable reviews,grossing US$185 million worldwide. Although Akerman was nominated for a Saturn Award for Best Supporting Actress for her performance in the film, critics were generally negative towards her acting. She also received nominations for a Teen Choice Award and two Scream Awards. In retrospect, she has stated that she struggled with her confidence while shooting the film and "felt way out of [her] league". Watchmen was the largest headlining project of her career at the time which she did not feel prepared for. She said, "I had no training and I was working with these fabulous theater actors who had all the training in the world. I definitely didn't feel worthy of being there."

Akerman appeared in the 2009 romantic comedy film The Proposal, starring Sandra Bullock and Ryan Reynolds in the lead roles. Akerman played a supporting role as Gertrude, the ex-girlfriend of Reynolds' character. Although the film received mixed reviews, it went on to gross US$317 million worldwide. Also in 2009, Akerman starred in the comedy film Couples Retreat, opposite Jon Favreau and Vince Vaughn. The film follows four couples as they travel to a tropical island resort for couples therapy. The film premiered in theatres in October 2009 and grossed US$34 million in its opening weekend in the United States, entering number one at the box office, and totalled US$171 million worldwide. Reception for the film was mainly negative, although Akerman's performance was met with more positive reactions.

In 2010, Akerman co-starred as Annie in the Josh Radnor-directed comedy-drama film Happythankyoumoreplease As her character has alopecia, Akerman shaved off her eyebrows and wore a bald cap to cover her hair. She was originally offered a different part, but felt that she wanted to play Annie as it was different from her previous roles. The film premiered at the Sundance Film Festival in January 2010 and received an audience award for Favorite U.S. Drama. Reviews from critics were polarized, but Akerman received praise. Later in 2010, she guest starred on the How I Met Your Mother episode "The Wedding Bride", and joined the cast of the Adult Swim comedy series Childrens Hospital. Playing the part of the promiscuous Dr. Valerie Flame, Akerman joined during the series' second season along with Henry Winkler. The series was originally a web series and Akerman accepted the role after viewing several webisodes. "It was totally up my alley, my kind of humor", she said of the series. The same year, she played a supporting role in the romantic comedy film The Romantics with Katie Holmes, Josh Duhamel and Anna Paquin. The film premiered in September 2010 on limited release to generally negative reviews.

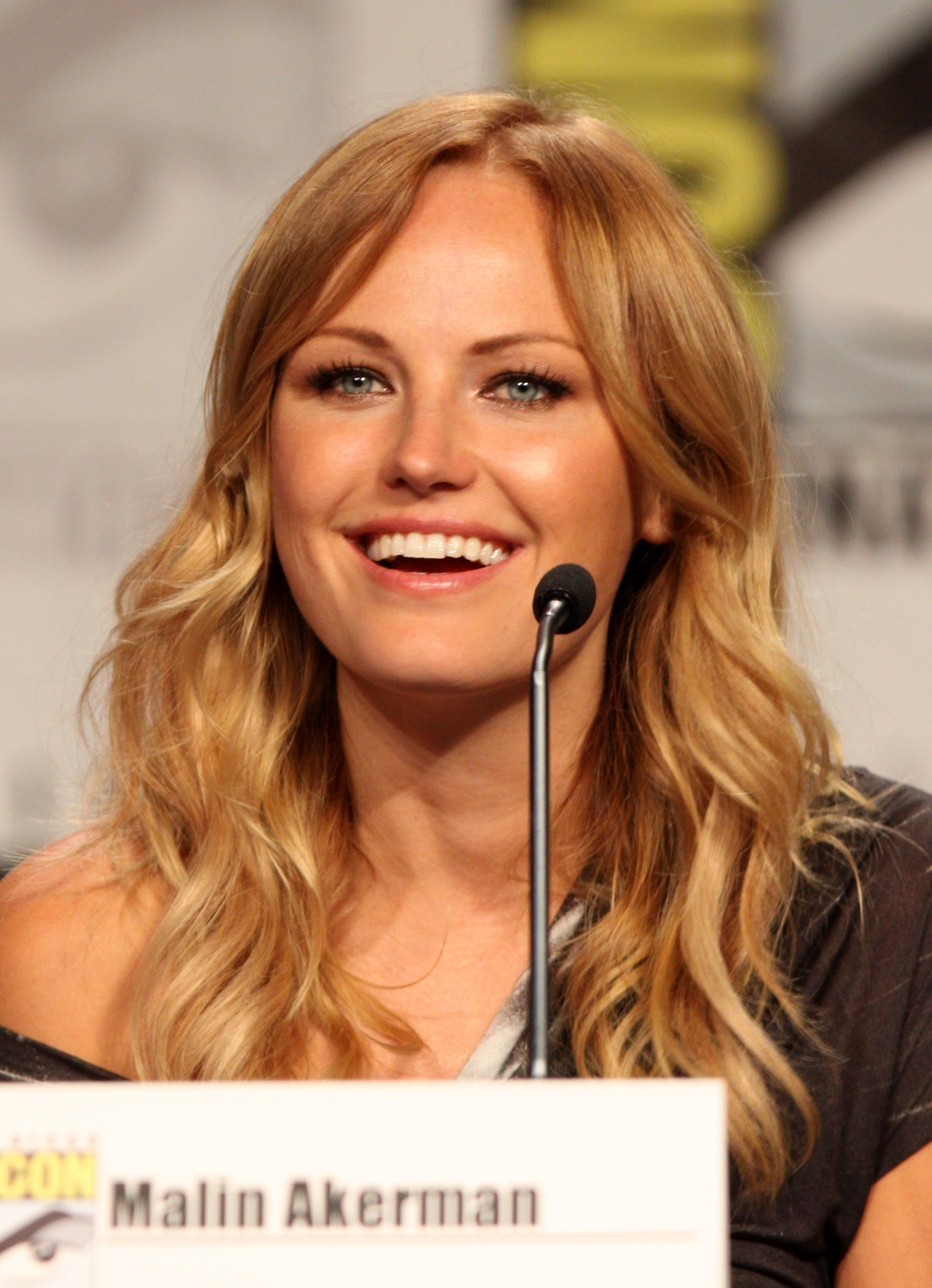
Akerman at 2011 Comic-Con International

In 2010, she starred in Sebastian Gutierrez's comedy film Elektra Luxx opposite Carla Gugino and Joseph Gordon-Levitt. The film is a sequel to 2009's Women in Trouble. Akerman played Trixie, an awkward drug store clerk who falls for Gordon-Levitt's character, who in turn is obsessed with Gugino's character, a retired porn star. Akerman was offered the role during a screening of Women in Trouble. The film premiered in March 2011 on limited release and received generally unfavourable reviews; critics dismissed it as a "bizarre sex comedy". Next, Akerman starred in the lead female role in the film The Bang Bang Club, which follows a group of young photojournalists in South Africa during the final stages of the apartheid. She played Robin Comley, a newspaper photo editor. The film premiered during the 2010 Toronto International Film Festival to mixed reviews from the press. In 2010, Akerman signed up for a part in newcomer Aaron Harvey's Catch .44, a drama-thriller film with Forest Whitaker and Bruce Willis in the male lead roles. The film was generally ignored by critics and movie goers alike.

=== Further film and television work (2012–2014) ===
Akerman had a supporting role in the 2012 comedy film Wanderlust, with Jennifer Aniston and Paul Rudd. The film focuses on an overworked couple who end up at a commune when they try to slow things down. Akerman played Eva, a woman at the commune. The film received mixed to positive reviews from critics, who were divided regarding its humour, but ultimately praised the cast. Wanderlust underperformed at the box office, earning just over US$20 million worldwide during its theatrical run. Akerman appeared in the comedy film The Giant Mechanical Man, which premiered at the Tribeca Film Festival in April 2012 to average reviews. She had a supporting role in the 2012 rock musical film Rock of Ages, based on the stage production of the same name. She played Constance Sack, a journalist who interviews Tom Cruise's character Stacee Jaxx. She hired a vocal coach as her role required her to sing; she and Cruise recorded a duet of Foreigner's "I Want to Know What Love Is" (1984). The duet appears on the soundtrack, which peaked at number five on the Billboard 200 and sold 320,000 copies in the US. Although the film grossed lower than expected, its opening weekend gross in the United States became the third-highest ever for an adaption of a stage production.

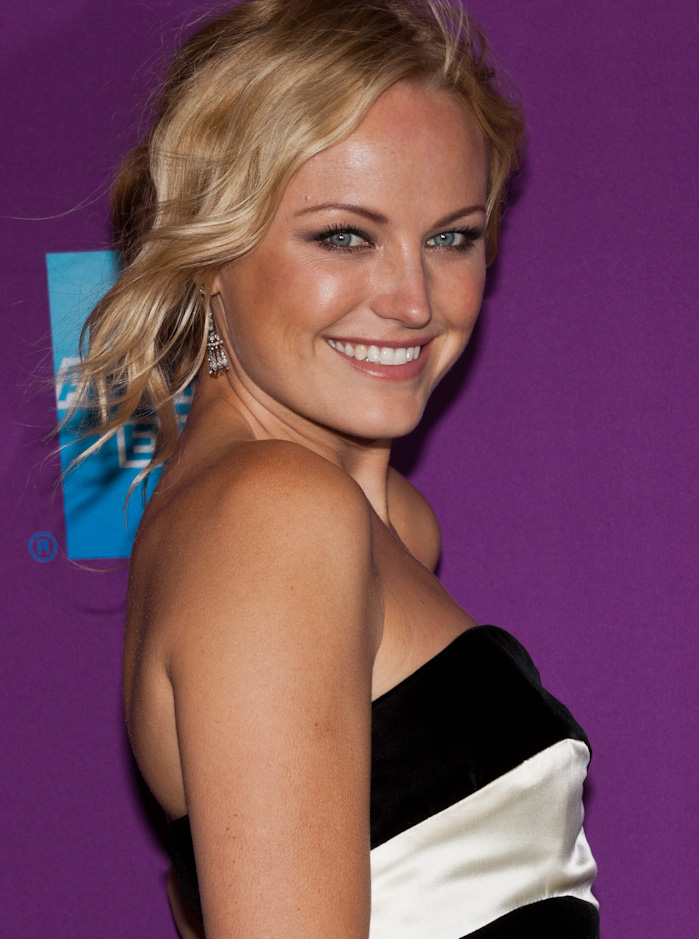
Akerman at the 2012 Tribeca Film Festival

Akerman played opposite Nicolas Cage in the 2012 bank heist action film Stolen. The film received negative reviews from critics and bombed at the box office. Next, Akerman appeared in the crime film Hotel Noir (2012), the comedy horror film Cottage Country (2013), and the action thriller The Numbers Station (2013), all of which were panned by critics. In 2013, Akerman portrayed Debbie Harry in Randall Miller's film CBGB. The film received a limited theatrical release and was met with negative reviews in the press. During this time, she had several guest roles on television, including the series Newsreaders, Robot Chicken, and Welcome to Sweden. From 2012 to 2013, she had a recurring role on ABC's comedy series Suburgatory as Alex, the absent mother of the main character Tessa. Akerman was also a contestant on the comedy series Burning Love (2012), which parodied the reality series The Bachelor.

From 2013 to 2014, Akerman held the lead role on the ABC sitcom Trophy Wife. She played Kate Harrison, the third wife of Bradley Whitford's character. Marcia Gay Harden and Michaela Watkins co-starred as Whitford's two ex-wives. Akerman also served as a producer. She was initially put off by the title, "I saw the title and I said, 'Hell no, I'm not playing a trophy wife!'" However, she changed her mind after reading the script; she liked the writing and how the character is not actually a trophy wife. Executive producer Lee Eisenberg said the title was "always meant to be ironic". The series received positive reviews from critics, who praised the chemistry between the actors. Akerman received critical acclaim for her performance; Gabriel Mizrahi of The Huffington Post deemed her portrayal "terrific", and Matt Webb Mitovich of TVLine opined that she "no less than shines here, coming off as fun-loving but not flaky, warm and not overheated". Several television critics named it one of the best new sitcoms of 2013, and some criticized its title for confusing audiences by suggesting it is about something that it is not. Willa Paskin of Slate regarded the title "terrible" and "an insult to its lovely, daffy main character". Criticism was also directed towards ABC for giving the series a poor time slot. Trophy Wife aired for one season before its cancellation.

=== Recent work (2015–present) ===
Akerman was a main cast member on Yahoo! Screen's short-lived comedy series Sin City Saints (2015), which ran for an eight-episode season. She portrayed Dusty Halford, the lawyer of the eponymous basketball team. Akerman co-starred in Brett Haley's comedy-drama film I'll See You in My Dreams (2015) with Blythe Danner. The film premiered at the 2015 Sundance Film Festival to positive reviews. Also in 2015, she starred in the comedy slasher film The Final Girls with Taissa Farmiga. The film follows a group of high school students who are transported into a slasher film. The film received generally favourable reviews from critics, who noted its "surprising layer of genuine emotion" amidst "the meta amusement". Akerman was nominated for a Fangoria Chainsaw Award for Best Supporting Actress for her performance.

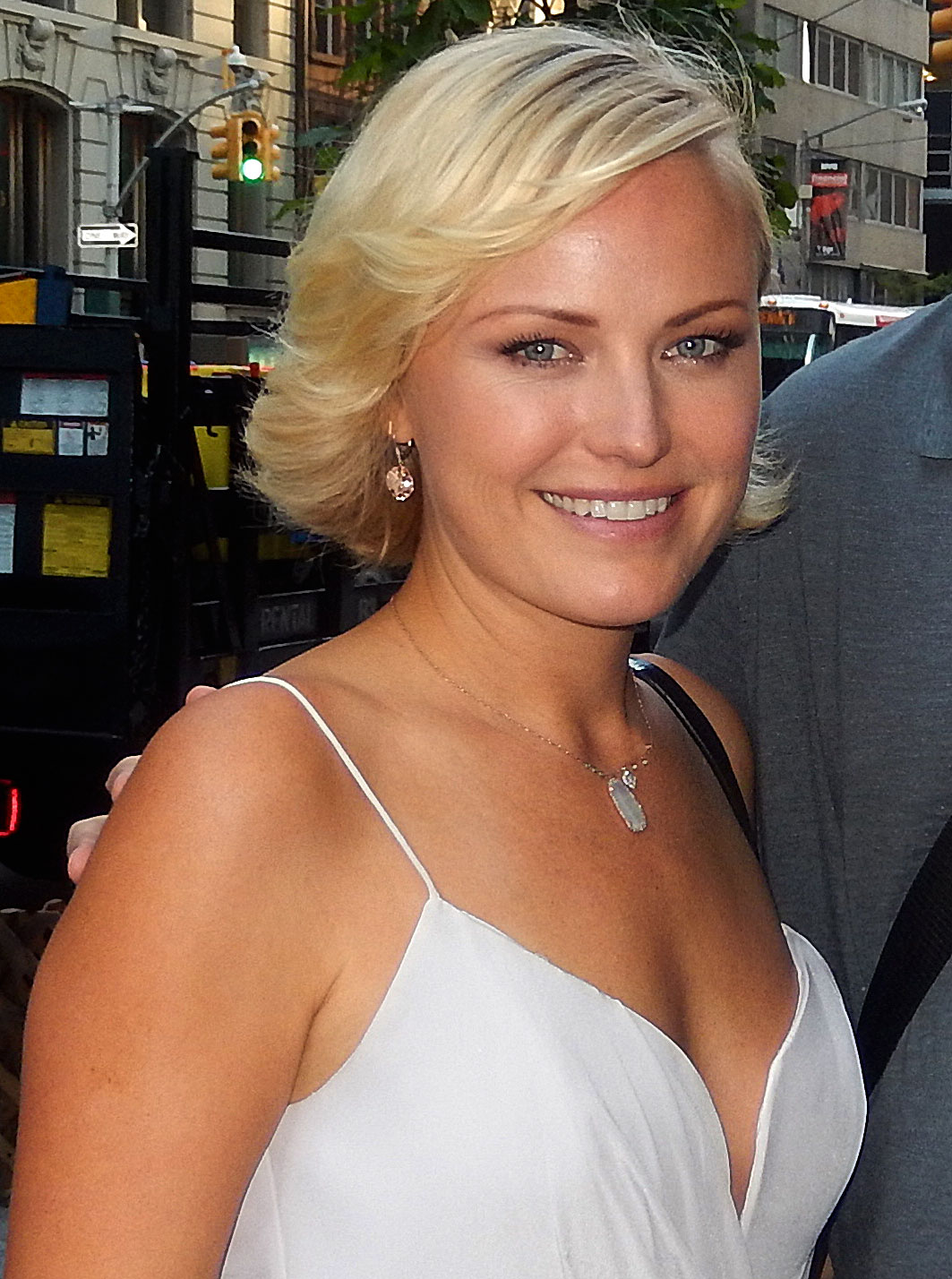
Akerman in July 2015

Akerman acted in two feature films in 2016, Misconduct and The Ticket, both of which received limited release. Critical reception of Misconduct was generally negative, while The Ticket attracted mixed reviews. Akerman's performance in the latter, as the wife of a blind man who regained his sight, was met with positive reception. The same year, Akerman starred alongside Orlando Bloom and Kate Micucci on an episode of the Netflix comedy-drama series Easy, an anthology series with stand-alone episodes of different characters exploring relationships. From 2016 to 2019, Akerman was a main cast member on the Showtime drama series Billions, playing the role of Lara Axelrod, the wife of billionaire hedge fund manager Bobby Axelrod, portrayed by Damian Lewis. Akerman enjoyed playing the character due to her "no-nonsense" attitude. The series received critical acclaim. She stepped into a recurring role for the third season to accommodate for roles in other projects, which was written into the storyline with her character becoming Bobby's ex-wife.

Akerman was cast in Brad Peyton's science fiction monster film Rampage (2018), based on the video game series of the same name, as Claire Wyden, the CEO of a company responsible for the infection and mutation of several animals. She liked playing a villain for the first time as it was a "good challenge". She said, "I don't think she had any redeeming qualities, but I don't think characters have to have redeeming qualities. It's quite fun to just enjoy being evil". The film became a commercial success with a worldwide revenue of US$428 million, ending up as the twenty-first highest-grossing film of 2018. Critical reception was mixed, with some critics deeming it a "brainless blockbuster". In 2019, Akerman made a guest appearance on the Comedy Central educational comedy series Drunk History where she played accused murderer Beulah Annan. Akerman played the role of Grace Richmond, the mother of Liana Liberato's character, in Martha Stephens' coming-of-age drama To the Stars (2019). The film premiered at the 2019 Sundance Film Festival to positive reviews from critics.

Akerman signed on for an NBC drama pilot titled Prism in February 2019. The pilot, directed by Daniel Barnz, details a murder trial told through different perspectives of each key person involved, with Akerman as public defender Rachel Lewis. NBC passed on the project in May 2019. Akerman played her first Swedish-speaking film role in the jukebox musical film A Piece of My Heart, directed by Edward af Sillén and based on music by Swedish singer Tomas Ledin. The film received a Christmas 2019 release in Sweden. She also starred in The Sleepover, directed by Trish Sie for Netflix. Akerman was cast in the comedy film Friendsgiving, directed by Nicol Paone in her directorial debut. Akerman is also a producer on the project. She appeared in an episode of the AMC anthology series Soulmates, which premiered on 5 October 2020. She starred in the comedy film Chick Fight (2020) about an all-female underground fight club.

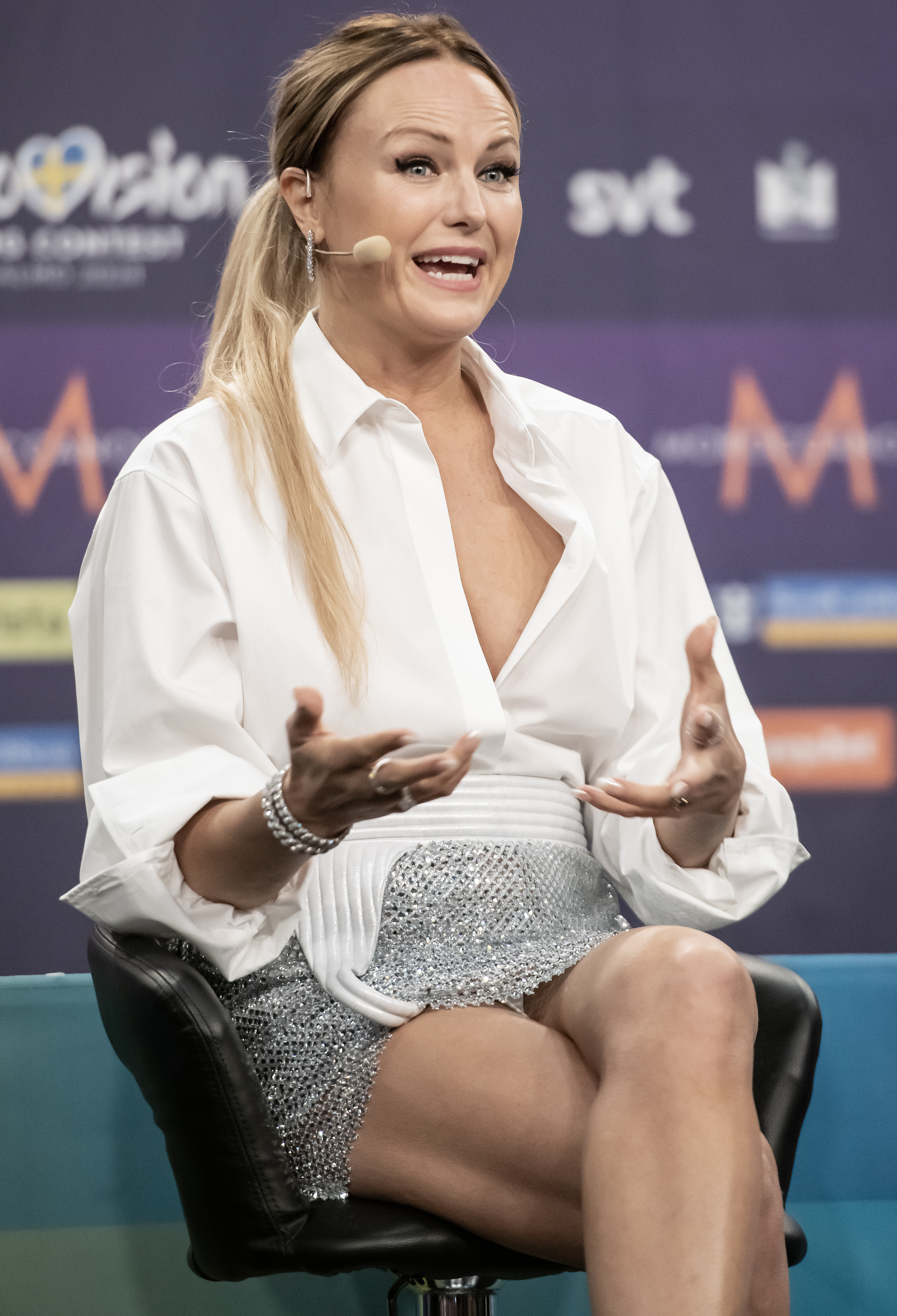
Akerman at the Eurovision 2024 hosts' press conference

In 2020, Akerman played the lead role of Ally in the CBS comedy pilot The Three of Us which was created by Frank Pines. In 2022, she starred in A Week in Paradise, The Aviary, and Slayers.

In 2023, Akerman competed in season nine of The Masked Singer as "Squirrel". While having bested Michael Bolton as "Wolf" and Keenan Allen as "Gargoyle" (who was spared by Jenny McCarthy ringing the Ding Dong Keep It On Bell) on "DC Superheroes Night", she was eliminated on "Sesame Street Night" alongside Lele Pons as "Jackalope". Also in 2023, Akerman starred in The Donor Party, Us or Them. and The Christmas Classic, all of which received limited release. She played her second Swedish-speaking film role in Ett sista race, released in Swedish cinemas in December 2023.

On 5 February 2024, it was announced that Akerman, alongside Petra Mede, would host the Eurovision Song Contest 2024 in Malmö, Sweden. Akerman currently stars in The Hunting Wives alongside Brittany Snow for Netflix, based upon the novel of the same name by May Cobb.

== Personal life ==
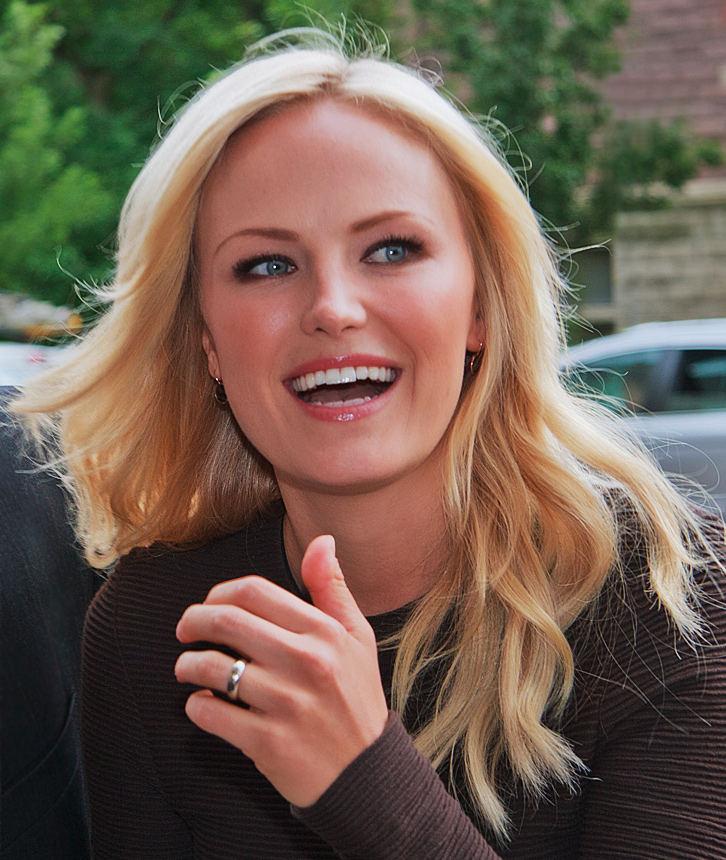
Akerman in September 2010

Having been born in Sweden and raised in Canada, Akerman has said that she has "conflicting feelings" for the two countries. In an interview for Toronto Star, she said, "Every time I'm in Canada I feel more Swedish, and every time I'm in Sweden I feel more Canadian. I belong in both places and I love them both equally." She is a Swedish citizen but not a Canadian one, instead having permanent residency in Canada. She became an American citizen in October 2018. Apart from speaking fluent English and Swedish, she also speaks French, Italian and Spanish.

Akerman met Italian musician Roberto Zincone in 2003, when she was the lead singer for the Petalstones, for which he was the drummer. They usually socialized after band practice, using a dictionary as Zincone could not speak English. They eventually started dating and married in Sorrento in June 2007. In 2013 they had a son named Sebastian. The couple separated in November 2013, and Zincone filed for divorce later that month. In October 2017, Akerman announced her engagement to English actor Jack Donnelly. They married in Tulum in December 2018.

Inspired by her Buddhist upbringing, Akerman has a lotus flower tattoo on her upper back. She also has a tattooed "Z" on her right wrist, which she got to honor Zincone when they were married. Following her separation, she added an "S" over the "Z" in honor of her son.

In 2010, Akerman revealed that she is dyslexic and that it takes her "a long time" to learn her lines: "I get horrified when I have to do table reads with the whole cast, because there's a lot of stuttering coming from me, so I have to do a lot of prep." Because of this, she prefers to improvise her lines.

== Public image ==
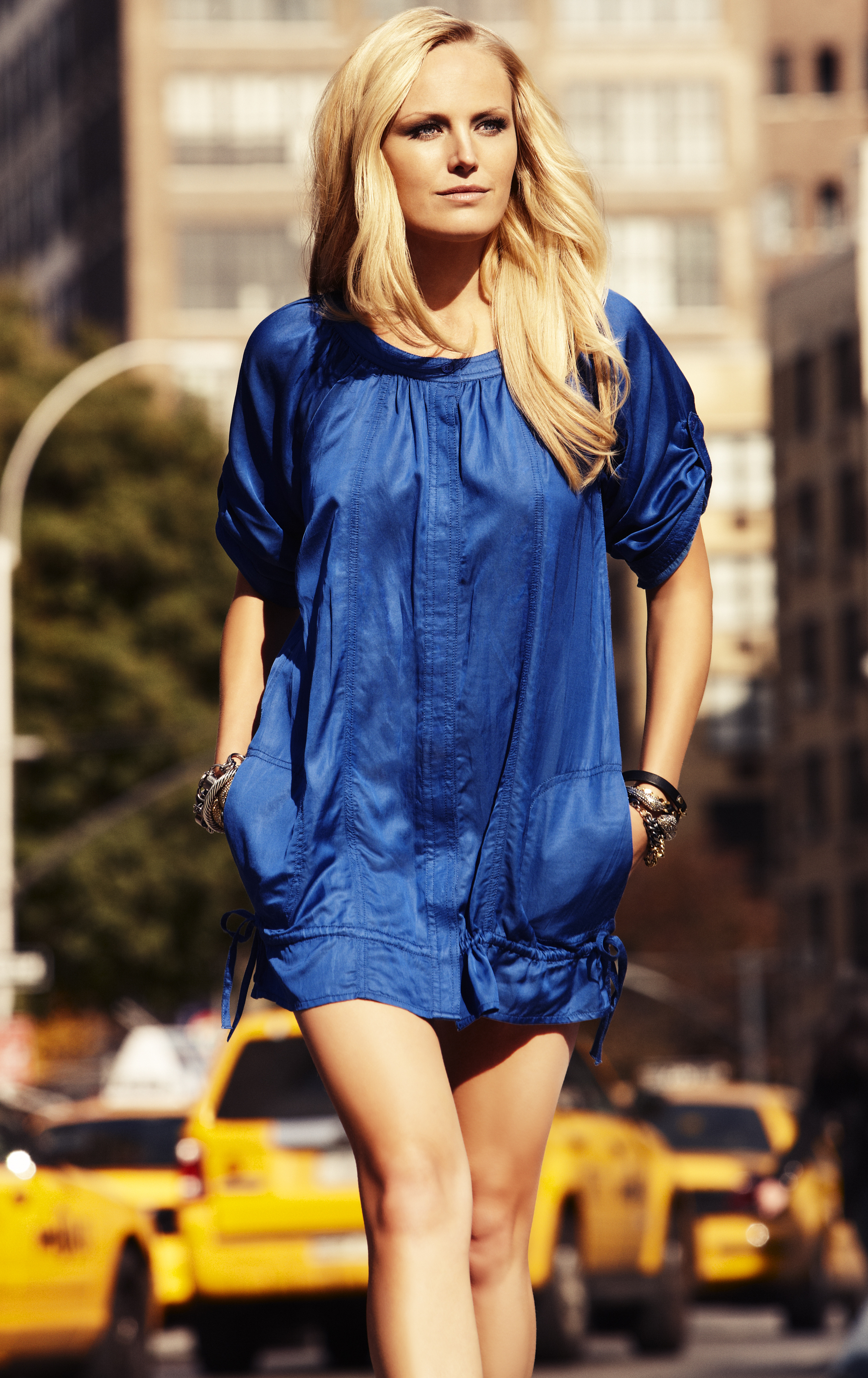
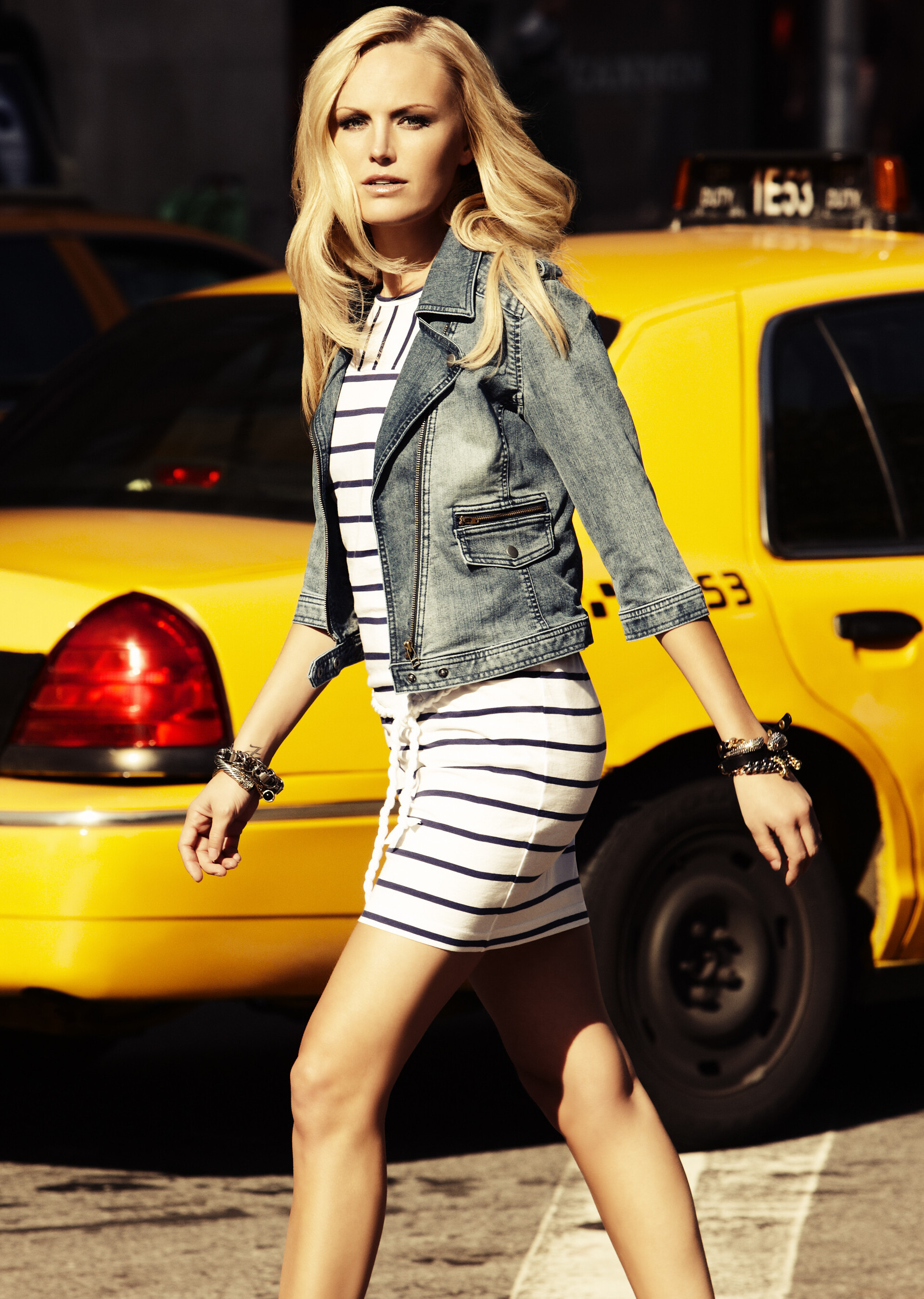
Akerman in a commercial for the Swedish clothing retailer Sisters in 2009

In 2008 Akerman made her first appearance on AskMen.com's "99 Most Desirable Women" list at number 60. The same year men's magazine Maxim placed her at number 59 in their annual "Hot 100" rankings. The following year the magazine ranked her at number four.

In 2012 Akerman travelled to Tanzania with Opportunity International and has since begun support of their international development work, becoming a Young Ambassador for Opportunity in June 2012, and hosting a fundraiser for Opportunity in October 2012. She served food with fellow actress January Jones at the Los Angeles Mission's annual Thanksgiving event in 2021.

== Filmography ==
Key
†	Denotes films that have not yet been released

=== Film ===
Year	Title	Role	Notes
2000	The Skulls	Coed in Caleb's Apartment	
2002	The Fraternity	Tess	Also known as The Circle
2003	The Utopian Society	Tanci	
2004	Harold & Kumar Go to White Castle	Liane	
2007	The Invasion	Autumn	Uncredited
2007	The Brothers Solomon	Tara	
2007	The Heartbreak Kid	Lila	
2007	Heavy Petting	Daphne	
2008	27 Dresses	Tess Nichols	
2009	Bye Bye Sally	Sally	Short film
2009	Watchmen	Laurie Jupiter / Silk Spectre II	
2009	The Proposal	Gertrude	
2009	Couples Retreat	Ronnie	
2010	Happythankyoumoreplease	Annie	
2010	The Romantics	Tripler	
2011	Elektra Luxx	Trixie	
2011	The Bang Bang Club	Robin Comley	
2011	Kaylien	Mom	Short film
2011	Catch .44	Tes	
2012	Wanderlust	Eva	
2012	The Giant Mechanical Man	Jill	
2012	Rock of Ages	Constance Sack	
2012	Stolen	Riley Simms	
2012	Hotel Noir	Swedish Mary	
2013	Cottage Country	Cammie Ryan	
2013	The Numbers Station	Katherine	
2013	CBGB	Debbie Harry	
2015	I'll See You in My Dreams	Katherine Petersen	
2015	The Final Girls	Amanda Cartwright / Nancy	
2015	Unity	Narrator (voice)	Documentary
2016	Misconduct	Emily	
2016	The Ticket	Sam	
2018	Rampage	Claire Wyden	
2019	To the Stars	Grace Richmond	
2019	A Piece of My Heart	Isabella	
2020	The Sleepover	Margot	
2020	Friendsgiving	Molly	Also producer
2020	Chick Fight	Anna	Also producer
2022	A Week in Paradise	Maggie	
2022	The Aviary	Jillian	Also executive producer
2022	Slayers	Beverly Rektor	Also executive producer
2023	The Donor Party	Jaclyn	Also producer
2023	Us or Them	The Officiator	
2023	The Christmas Classic	Elizabeth Bird	
2023	Ett sista race	Tove	
2025	Neighborhood Watch	DeeDee McNally	
2026	Let's Love	Andrea	
TBA	Perfectly Imperfect †	Meg	Post-production

=== Television ===
Year	Title	Role	Notes
1997	Earth: Final Conflict	Avatar	Episode: "Truth"
2000	The Others	Diane Stillman	Episode: "Pilot"
2000	Relic Hunter	Elena	Episode: "Affaire de Coeur"
2001	Twice in a Lifetime	Ramona Dubois	Episode: "Knockout"
2001	Doc	Maddy Dodge	Episode: "Face in the Mirror"
2001	Witchblade	Karen Bronte	Episode: "Conundrum"
2005, 2014, 2026	The Comeback	Juna Millken	Main role (season 1), recurring role (season 2–3); 16 episodes
2006	Love Monkey	Kira Dungen	Episode: "The One That Got Away"
2006	Entourage	Tori	2 episodes
2010	How I Met Your Mother	Movie Stella	Episode: "The Wedding Bride"
2010–2016	Childrens Hospital	Dr. Valerie Flame / Ingrid Hagerstown	Main role (seasons 2–7)
2012	Burning Love	Willow	8 episodes
2012–2013	Suburgatory	Alex Altman	3 episodes
2013, 2014	Newsreaders	Ingrid Hagerstown	2 episodes
2013	Robot Chicken	Black Widow (voice)	Episode: "Robot Fight Accident"
2013–2014	Trophy Wife	Kate Harrison	Main role; also producer
2014	Welcome to Sweden	Malin Åkerman	Episode: "Breakups"
2015	Lip Sync Battle	Herself	Episode: "Stephen Merchant vs. Malin Akerman"
2015	Sin City Saints	Dusty Halford	Main role
2016	Easy	Lucy	Episode: "Utopia"
2016	Comedy Bang! Bang!	Herself	Episode: "Malin Akerman Wears a Black Blouse and Cropped Jeans"
2016–2019	Billions	Lara Axelrod	Main role (seasons 1–3), guest role (season 4)
2019	Drunk History	Beulah Annan	Episode: "Femme Fatales"
2019–2022	Dollface	Celeste	Recurring role
2020	Medical Police	Dr. Valerie Flame	3 episodes
2020	Soulmates	Martha	Episode: "Break on Through"
2023	The Masked Singer	Herself / Squirrel	Season 9 contestant; 2 episodes
2024	Eurovision Song Contest 2024	Co-presenter	with Petra Mede
2025–present	The Hunting Wives	Margo Banks	Main role
2026	Rick and Morty	Uli (voice)	Episode: "Field of Dreams"

== Awards and nominations ==
Year	Award	Category	Nominated work	Result	Ref.
2009	Golden Schmoes Awards	Best T&A of the Year	Watchmen	Won	
2009	Teen Choice Awards	Choice Movie Actress: Action	Watchmen	Nominated	
2009	Scream Awards	Breakout Performance – Female	Watchmen	Nominated	
2009	Scream Awards	Best Superhero	Watchmen	Nominated	
2010	Saturn Awards	Best Supporting Actress	Watchmen	Nominated	
2015	Fright Meter Awards	Best Actress in a Supporting Role	The Final Girls	Nominated	
2016	Fangoria Chainsaw Awards	Best Supporting Actress	The Final Girls	Nominated	

== Notes ==
Preceded by (United Kingdom) Alesha Dixon, Hannah Waddingham, (Ukraine) Julia Sanina and (Republic of Ireland) Graham Norton (final)	Eurovision Song Contest presenter 2024; With: Petra Mede	Succeeded by (Switzerland) Hazel Brugger, Sandra Studer and Michelle Hunziker (final)
