= Friendsgiving =

Meal circa Thanksgiving eaten with friends

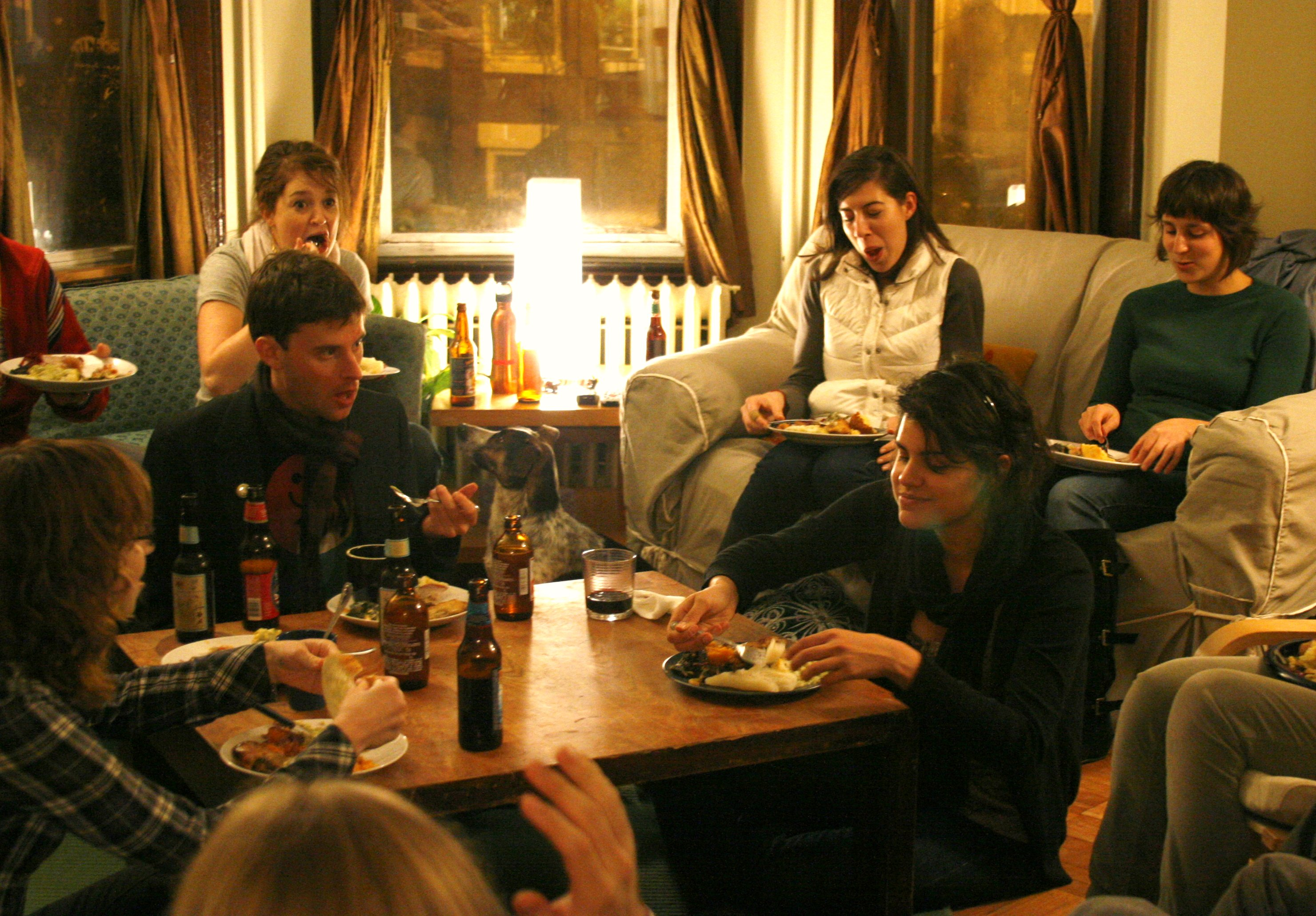
A casual Friendsgiving

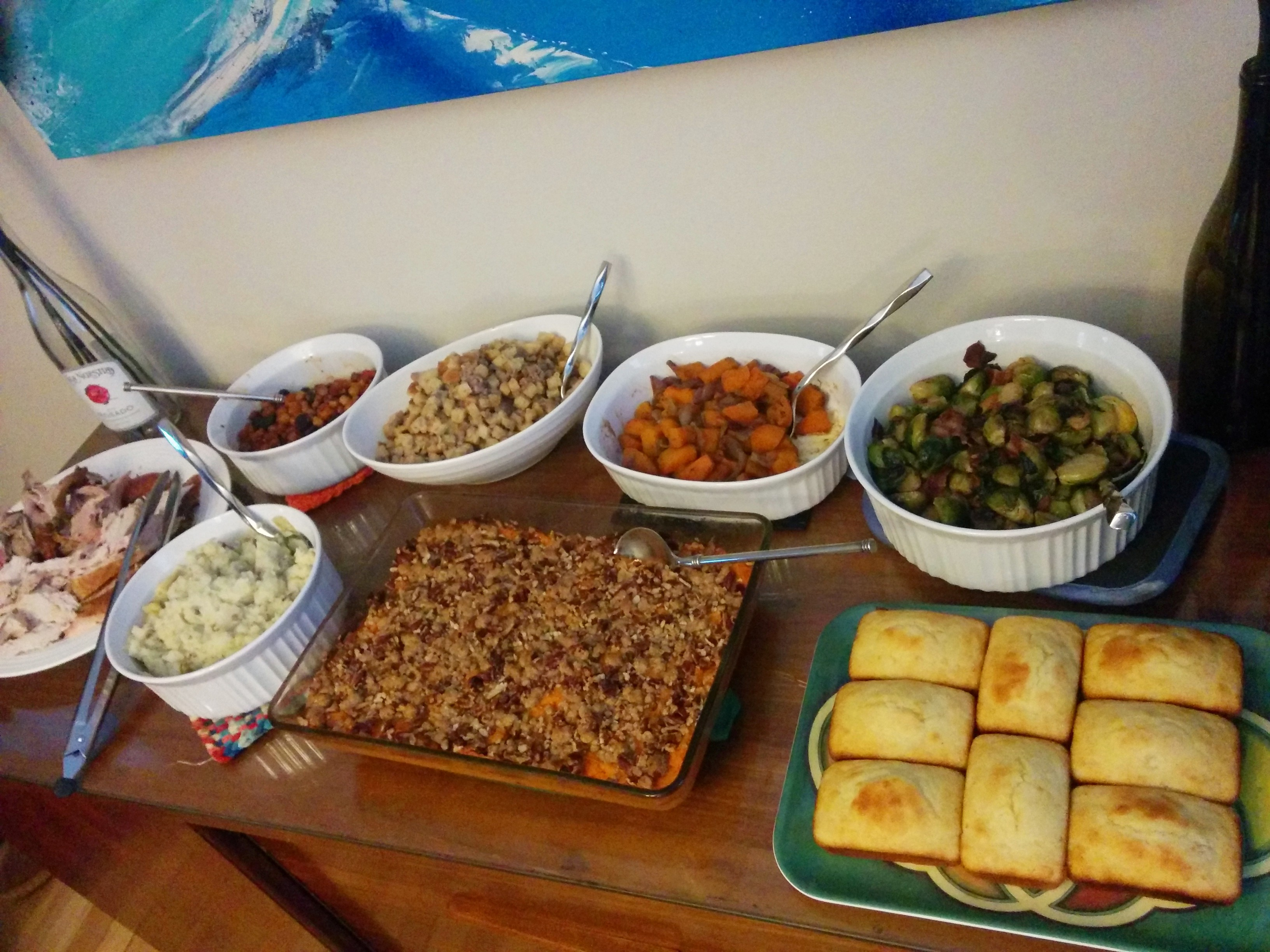
A Friendsgiving spread

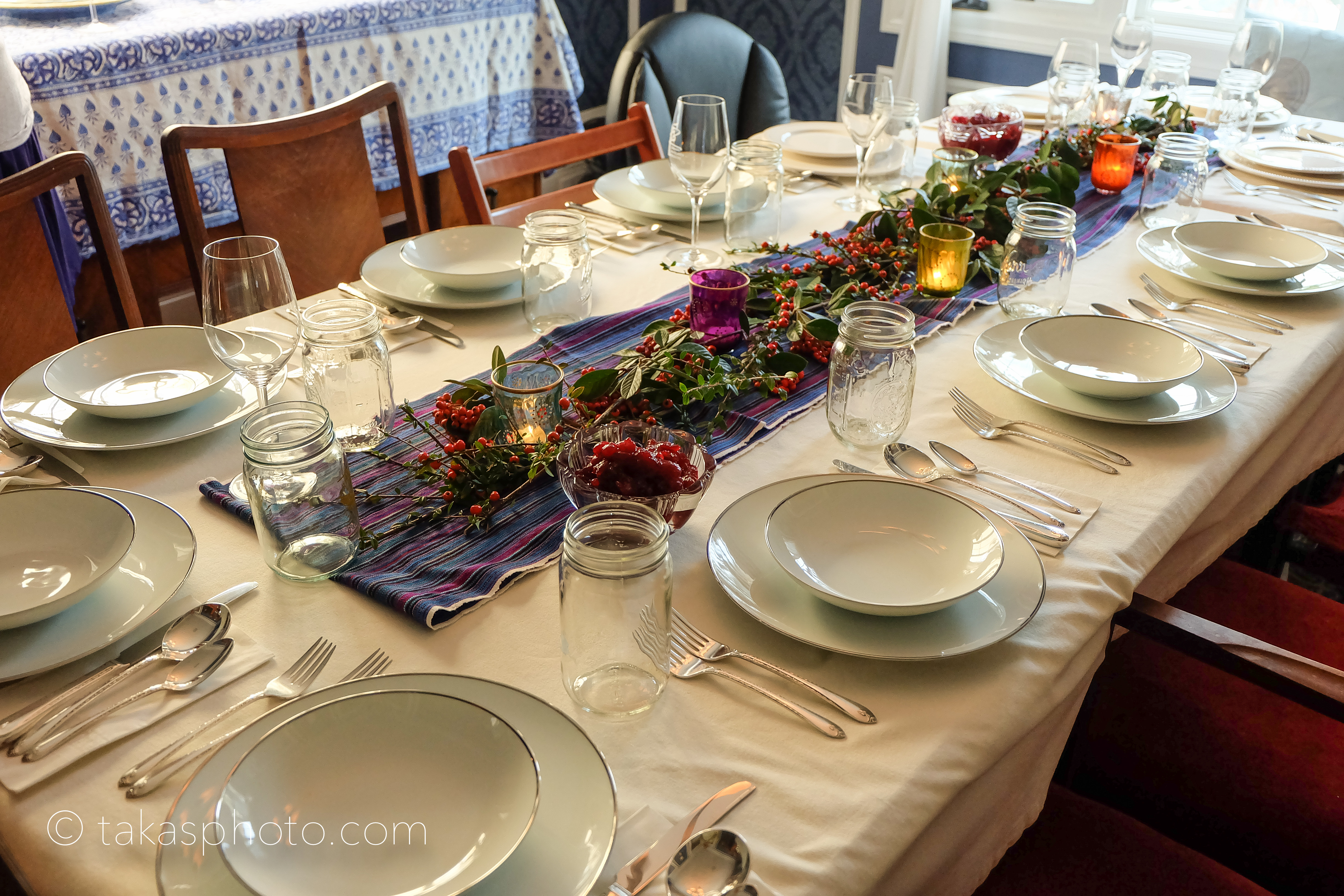
Place setting for a more formal friendsgiving dinner

Friendsgiving is a Thanksgiving-themed feast meal eaten with friends, typically prior to or instead of a family Thanksgiving dinner in the United States.

The meal began as an additional holiday or as an alternative to the traditional family Thanksgiving gathering for people, typically young adults, who could not or did not want to go home for the holiday. For some celebrants, Friendsgiving has evolved from a pre-Thanksgiving gathering to replace traditional Thanksgiving entirely, but most celebrate it as a second and separate event during the Thanksgiving season.

While the term was first used online in 2007, the concept of Thanksgiving celebrated with friends as an alternative to celebrating with family is an older concept that dates back decades.

== Description ==
Friendsgiving is a large meal eaten with friends on or near Thanksgiving. The meal itself is often produced potluck-style, with each participant bringing items. Those celebrated on Thanksgiving Day generally replicate a Thanksgiving dinner, while those that are additional gatherings may or may not. Some people use Friendsgiving to test out new Thanksgiving recipes.

Participants are generally close friends who live in the same area; when produced on Thanksgiving Day the meal is most common in places with many transplants for whom traveling home for the holiday is logistically or emotionally difficult. Articles in 2018 described the event as particularly popular in urban areas and among millennials, though participation has broadened. It is popular in the LGBTQ+ community, many members of which have strained relationships with their biological families.

The meal is also often celebrated among groups of coworkers as a potluck holiday party.

== History ==
A Charlie Brown Thanksgiving, released in 1973, centers around a Thanksgiving meal among friends that closely resembles what would become Friendsgiving, with Woman's World commenting in 2022 that the special portrayed "perhaps an early example of Friendsgiving." Alice Brock and her husband Ray were known for hosting Thanksgiving dinners for their friends in the mid-1960s; many of those who attended the dinners were estranged from their families. These dinners partially inspired the song "Alice's Restaurant", a song that itself became a Thanksgiving tradition; Arlo Guthrie, the author and singer of the song, had attended one of the Brocks' Thanksgiving dinners in 1965.

According to Merriam-Webster, the first use of the term Friendsgiving, a portmanteau of 'friends' and 'Thanksgiving', was in 2007 and referred to an informal meal. While early Friendsgiving meals were alternatives to a family Thanksgiving, the evolution of the concept into an additional (rather than alternative) meal came later. According to NPR, by 2011 the use of the term "(hit) it big".

By 2013 the Emily Post Institute started receiving etiquette questions about the meal. The term wasn't frequently searched on Google prior to 2012, but by 2013 was being searched regularly and from then, searches on the term increased "exponentially" in following years.

The term was added to the Merriam-Webster dictionary in 2020. In 2022 Joe and Jill Biden celebrated a traditional turkey dinner several days before Thanksgiving at a Marine base.

The concept reached the United Kingdom, where Thanksgiving (nor its historic equivalent horkey) is not a public holiday, in the 2020s; a survey indicated that 42% of millennials and Generation Z members had taken part in a Thanksgiving or Friendsgiving meal.

== In media ==
In 2011, a liqueur advertisement with a Friendsgiving theme appeared and the concept was a plot point in an episode of The Real Housewives of New Jersey.

In 2019, Emily Stephenson published The Friendsgiving Handbook. In 2020, Nicol Paone wrote and directed the comedy-drama Friendsgiving for Saban Films.

== Analysis ==
The growth in popularity is attributed to social elements including the chosen family and the evolution of Thanksgiving in the United States from a single-day event into a Thanksgiving season. According to NPR in 2025, as many as 20% of Americans celebrate Friendsgiving.

The New York Times called it "more than just a riff on Thanksgiving". Reason magazine called it "cultural flourishing, not cultural decay". The Washington Post said it allowed participants to "curate" the holiday with their own traditions.

Michael Hendrix of the Manhattan Institute described it as "a table set with lonely millennials practicing traditions of their choosing", arguing it had developed partially a result of delayed household formation among that cohort. Pete Wells wrote in 2019 that the many published 'How to' and 'Rules for' hosting a Friendsgiving are a result of so many of those embracing the event not being experienced at hosting large dinner parties.

Malcolm Harris argues that the use of a "cutesy" portmanteau for a "scraped-together, potluck-style event popular with Millennials...implies approval by the powers that be of Millennial adults’ lower income and lower living standards compared with those of prior generations" and that its development is "an expected manifestation" of that lowered living standard; he called the event "a propaganda weapon used by the ruling class to further their plans for wage stagnation."
