= Chick Fight =

2020 US action comedy film by Paul Leyden

- Official poster
- Directed by: Paul Leyden
- Written by: Joseph Downey
- Produced by: Malin Åkerman; Jordan Beckerman; Ash Christian; Anne Clements; Jordan Yale Levine; Michael J. Rothstein; Benson Taylor
- Starring: Malin Åkerman; Bella Thorne; Dulcé Sloan; Kevin Connolly; Kevin Nash; Alec Mapa; Dominique Jackson; Fortune Feimster; Alec Baldwin
- Cinematography: Steve Holleran
- Edited by: Kevin Armstrong
- Music by: Benson Taylor
- Production companies: Media Finance Capital; YP
- Distributed by: Quiver Distribution; Redbox Entertainment
- Release date: November 13, 2020
- Running time: 97 minutes
- Country: United States
- Language: English
- Box office: $76,774

Chick Fight is a 2020 American action comedy film directed by Paul Leyden from a screenplay by Joseph Downey. It stars Malin Åkerman, Bella Thorne, Dulcé Sloan, Kevin Connolly, Kevin Nash, Alec Mapa, Dominique Jackson, Fortune Feimster and Alec Baldwin.

It was released on November 13, 2020, by Quiver Distribution and Redbox Entertainment.

== Plot ==
Anna Wyncomb works in a coffee shop and her dad, Ed, has dated Chuck since her mom, Mary, died nine months ago. One night, Anna and her best friend Charleen, a police officer, accidentally set the coffee shop on fire after enjoying a joint. Now blaming herself for the incident and totally broke, Charleen takes Anna to the underground all-female fight club and introduces her to Bear, the manager and the referee of the fight club. There, Charleen explains to Anna that the winning fighter puts a dollar bill on the wall with their name on it and the fight club serves as a safe haven for women, who want to cope with the problems of their lives. Charleen persuades Anna that she must agree to fight in order to resolve her problems. Anna reluctantly agrees and fights in her first bout but is easily knocked out. Anna realizes that her mom founded the fight club and has fought several bouts, a secret that her mom kept from Anna her whole life, dying from cancer six months after her final fight.

Anna is then introduced to former boxing coach Jack Murphy, who now works in a restaurant at the beachside and agrees to train her. She later meets Olivia, an undefeated fighter, who antagonizes her and Anna challenges her to a fight, which she accepts. As the days and her training progresses, she wins several fights. Anna is attracted to Roy, the attending doctor for the fight club who also works in the local hospital - despite the fact that he has a relationship with Olivia. However, they end their relationship after a drunken night. However, Anna did not take it seriously and ignores his advances. Anna later witnesses Olivia fighting three girls in the ring and savagely knocking out all of them. Realizing how savage Olivia is, Anna quits, saying that fighting is not the best solution to solving her problems.

The next day, Jack convinces Anna to continue to fight and tells her to "leave behind fear and doubt and take that final step to bravery". Anna then receives a call from Chuck saying that her dad is in the hospital after suffering a heart attack. Arriving there with Charleen already at the room, Ed tells Anna that he knows her mom founded the fight club and has passed its ownership to Anna. Charleen convinces Anna to sell the fight club and start a new life. When Roy appears, Ed persuades Anna to reconnect with him. She apologizes to him, and Roy reveals to her that he never had sex with Olivia and has been only thinking of Anna.

On the night of her fight, with renewed courage, Anna confronts Olivia for the first time in the ring. Anna is overwhelmed by Olivia in early rounds, but as per Jack's advice, Anna uses her headbutt to knock her out, eventually winning the fight and thus marking Olivia's first loss. As the police arrives at the door to raid the fight club, Olivia pays respect to Anna before escaping with the fellow fighters and, despite Charleen's objection, Anna chooses to stay behind, stating that she now takes the ownership of her mom's fight club, and is arrested.

Charleen bails Anna out of jail but Anna is put on trial for her misdemeanor. Aided by her lawyer Chuck and the presiding judge Naomi Andrews, Mary's old friend, Anna is acquitted of all charges. Three months later, Anna has renovated the fight club and she agrees to fight with Charleen as a friendly fight. But the two get knocked out at the same time and call Roy for medical attention. Later, Anna goes to the restaurant to pay Jack for her training fee but is shocked to find that she has to pay much more than she had expected.

== Cast ==
- Malin Åkerman as Anna
- Alec Baldwin as Jack Murphy
- Bella Thorne as Olivia
- Dulcé Sloan as Charleen
- Fortune Feimster as Bear
- Vitoria Setta as Noel
- Kevin Connolly as Dr. Roy
- Alec Mapa as Chuck
- Kevin Nash as Ed
- Dominique Jackson as Naomi
- Mariana Paola Vicente as Marnie
- Nicol Paone as Betty

== Production ==
In September 2019, it was announced Malin Åkerman had joined the cast of the film and serve as a producer with Paul Leyden directing from a screenplay by Joseph Downey. In December 2019, Alec Baldwin and Bella Thorne joined the cast of the film. Principal photography began in January 2020.

== Soundtrack ==
Chick Fight - Round One (Original Motion Picture Soundtrack)

Soundtrack album by Various Artists
- Released: November 13, 2020
- Genre: Pop
- Length: 18:47
- Label: RUNWAY

Singles from Chick Fight - Round One (Original Motion Picture Soundtrack)
- 1. "Bad Bitches" Released: November 13, 2020

The soundtrack was written and produced by Benson Taylor, Taylor also recorded a song with Los Angeles based band, Bones UK, the song briefly features in the official trailer released on October 6, 2020. Jennifer Akerman co-wrote 7 original songs with Taylor, performed under her artist name "Final Child".

== Release ==
In September 2020, Quiver Distribution and Redbox Entertainment acquired distribution rights to the film. It was released on November 13, 2020.

== Reception ==
On the review aggregator website Rotten Tomatoes, 37% of 30 critics' reviews are positive, with an average rating of 4.8/10. On Metacritic, it has a score of 39 based on reviews from 6 critics, indicating "generally unfavorable" reviews.

Frank Scheck of The Hollywood Reporter wrote: "There are some undeniably amusing moments, thanks largely to a cast unafraid to throw themselves into the raunchiness and violence with full abandon, but it's hard to avoid the feeling that the film represents a missed opportunity." Jessica Kiang of Variety wrote: "Instead of the cleavage, hair-pulling and Jerry Springer antics it teases, Chick Fight serves up a blandly formulaic and scrupulously inoffensive tale of female empowerment."
