= Cougars, Inc. =

2011 American comedy film

- Directed by: K. Asher Levin
- Written by: Asher Levin
- Produced by: Amir Cyrus Ahanchian (EP), Graham Larson, Jack Schuster, and Danny Roth; Barry Brooker (EP), Mickey Gooch (EP), Eli Wooten (EP) and Josh Monkarsh (EP)
- Starring: Kyle Gallner; Kathryn Morris; Denise Richards; Jim Belushi; Maeve Quinlan
- Cinematography: Harris Charalambous
- Edited by: Brian Hoey
- Production companies: Sycophant Films; Lookout Films; StoneBrook Entertainment
- Distributed by: Lionsgate
- Release date: May 10, 2011
- Running time: 87 minutes
- Country: United States
- Language: English
- Budget: $1 million

Cougars, Inc., developed under the title Mother's Little Helpers and displayed in the title shot as Cougars Inc., is an American independent comedy written and directed by K. Asher Levin about a college-age teenager, played by Kyle Gallner, and his friends' adventures as escorts to attractive older women. The direct-to-DVD film was released May 10, 2011.

== Cast ==
- Kyle Gallner as Sam
- Kathryn Morris as Alison
- James Belushi as Dan
- Sarah Hyland as Courtney
- Maeve Quinlan as Kitty Lowell
- Cary Alexander as Chuck
- Denise Richards as Judy
- Ryan Pinkston as Jimmy
- Rome Shadanloo as Angie
- Rebecca Mader as Mary
- Christian Murphy as Teddy
