= The Kill Room =

2023 film by Nicol Paone

- Theatrical release poster
- Directed by: Nicol Paone
- Written by: Jonathan Jacobson
- Produced by: Uma Thurman; Bill Kenwright; Dannielle Thomas; Jason Weinberg; Anne Clements; William Rosenfeld; Jon Keeyes; Jordan Yale Levine; Jordan Beckerman; Nicol Paone; Ram Vishwas Hannurkar
- Starring: Uma Thurman; Joe Manganiello; Maya Hawke; Debi Mazar; Dree Hemingway; Samuel L. Jackson
- Cinematography: Bartosz Nalasek
- Edited by: Felipe Vasquez; Gillian Hutshing
- Music by: Jessica Rose Weiss; Jason Soudah
- Production companies: Yale Productions; Idiot Savant Pictures; Sucheta DreamWorks Productions
- Distributed by: Shout! Studios
- Release date: September 28, 2023
- Running time: 98 minutes
- Country: United States
- Language: English
- Box office: $724,285

The Kill Room is a 2023 American crime comedy thriller film directed by Nicol Paone and written by Jonathan Jacobson. It stars Uma Thurman, Joe Manganiello, Maya Hawke, Debi Mazar, Dree Hemingway, and Samuel L. Jackson. The film was released by Shout! Studios on September 28, 2023.

== Plot ==
Gordon uses a store selling bialy bread as a front for laundering money for the mafia. Reggie is a hitman for hire who kills his victims by suffocating them with a plastic bag. Patrice manages an elite art gallery that caters to the rich, but owes some money to a drug dealer, Nate, which she repays with a painting.

Nate meets with Reggie and Gordon and shows them the art piece he received from Patrice, worth $45,000. Impressed with the cost of the painting, Gordon meets with Patrice and proposes using her art for money laundering. She initially declines, but he leaves her his card. Trying to compete with Anika, a rival and flourishing art gallery manager, Patrice visits Gordon in desperation, agreeing to launder money for a cut of the proceeds, and asks for a painting to sell. Reggie, who has no art skills whatsoever, paints a random art piece which he gives to Patrice for money laundering purposes.

Mafia dons Anton and Andrei consent to money laundering via art, and Patrice calls the painter "The Bagman", a nickname for Reggie. The paintings by The Bagman sell for as high as $300,000. The Galvinsons, who are art connoisseurs, enquire about The Bagman's paintings, but are told that they are on the waiting list due to high demand for the artist's work. Patrice visits Reggie at his residence, and sees bags with red coloring on them, but does not realize it to be blood.

Patrice is able to arrange for Reggie to have his own art gallery show, and while talking about the inspiration for his art, comes to the realization that Reggie is a murderer. She undergoes shock, upset that she is involved not only in money laundering, but also in murder. However, The Bagman paintings win critical praise, and Patrice is invited to a dinner with the top mafia members, and is now considered a part of their crime family.

Patrice meets with Gordon and Reggie, and learns that Reggie prefers art to murder, but the mafia does not want to let go of him since he is a valuable asset. They finally agree to free Reggie of his obligations to them if he kills the Russian criminal, Roman Rashnikov. Rashnikov arrives by boat to Patrice's art gallery to meet The Bagman, but is killed by Reggie with a plastic bag. The bag covered with Rashnikov's blood is sold to the Galvinsons as a piece of art. Patrice tells Anton that his fingerprints are on the bag that killed Rashnikov, so she has immunity against him.

== Cast ==
- Uma Thurman as Patrice
- Joe Manganiello as Reggie
- Samuel L. Jackson as Gordon
- Maya Hawke as Grace
- Debi Mazar as the Kimono
- Dree Hemingway as Anika
- Candy Buckley as Mrs. Galvinson
- Larry Pine as Dr. Galvinson
- Jennifer Kim as Mae Li
- Mike Doyle as Rafael Pronto
- Matthew Maher as Nate
- Marianne Rendón as Nicole
- Liv Morgan as Emma
- Tom Pecinka as Anton
- Alexander Sokovikov as Roman Rashnikov
- Amy Keum as Leslie

== Production ==
The film was announced in April 2022, with Uma Thurman and Samuel L. Jackson starring, Jonathan Jacobson writing the screenplay, and Nicol Paone set to direct. In April 2022, it was announced that Joe Manganiello was cast. In May 2022, Dree Hemingway was revealed to have joined the cast. That same month, reality television star Leah McSweeney was revealed to be making her feature film debut in the project, and shortly afterwards Maya Hawke was announced as working with her mother, Thurman, on a project for the first time. In June 2022, WWE wrestler Liv Morgan was announced to have joined the cast.

Principal photography began in New York and New Jersey in early 2022. Filming was reported in Hoboken at Field Colony, a coworking space within an art gallery that was used as the primary shooting location. The furniture was removed and flat floor-to-ceiling flat panels were installed to recreate a 'white box' art gallery. Novado Gallery in Jersey City was used as a secondary art gallery for the film. Filming was scheduled to finish in June 2022, but issues with weather caused a delay and a re-location to Lavallette, New Jersey in October 2022.

== Release ==
In July 2023, Shout! Studios acquired the North American rights to The Kill Room. It was released in the United States on September 28, 2023.

== Reception ==
=== Critical response ===
On the review aggregator website Rotten Tomatoes, 61% of 28 critics' reviews are positive, with an average rating of 6.1/10. The website's consensus reads: "The Kill Room's talented cast and broadly comedic tone make for a reasonably diverting caper, even if its attempts to satirize the art world don't amount to much." Metacritic, which uses a weighted average, assigned the film a score of 58 out of 100, based on 7 critics, indicating "mixed or average" reviews.
