= Fortune Feimster =

American comedian (born 1980)

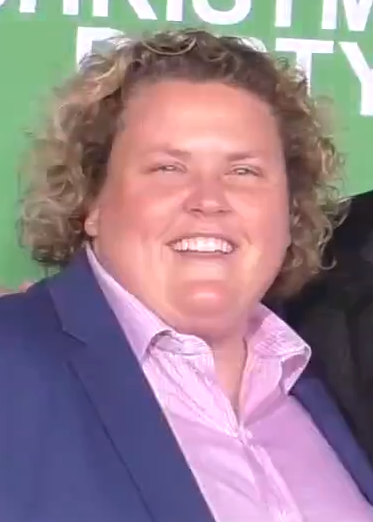
- Feimster at the premiere of Office Christmas Party in 2016
- Born: Emily Fortune Feimster; July 1, 1980 (age 46); Charlotte, North Carolina, U.S.
- Education: Peace College
- Occupations: Comedian, writer, actress
- Years active: 2002–present
- Spouse: Jacquelyn Smith (m. 2020; sep. 2025)

Emily Fortune Feimster (/ˈfiːmstər/; born July 1, 1980) is an American writer, comedian, and actress. Having made her television debut on NBC's Last Comic Standing in 2010, she starred as Colette on The Mindy Project (2015–2017). In July 2019, she began hosting the hit radio show What a Joke with Papa and Fortune with Tom Papa, interviewing comedians and celebrities, the first live programming on the SiriusXM channel Netflix is a Joke. She played Heather in The L Word: Generation Q, a reboot of The L Word.

== Early life and education ==
Feimster was born in Charlotte, North Carolina, to Mike and Ginger Feimster; the youngest of three, with two older brothers, Price and Jay. Fortune is her maternal great-grandmother's maiden name. Growing up in Belmont, North Carolina, she attended Belmont Central Elementary School and Belmont Junior High, subsequently graduating from South Point High School in 1998. That same year, she was presented to society at the Gastonia Debutante Ball. At South Point, she played basketball, softball, and tennis.

She attended Peace College, then a women-only school, and was elected student body president, majored in communications, and played soccer and tennis. She graduated summa cum laude and was the student speaker at commencement in 2002. The graduation speaker was Raleigh native actress Emily Procter, with whom Feimster became acquainted after the graduation.

== Career ==
After living in Spain for a year, she moved to Los Angeles in 2003 to become a personal assistant to Procter and pursue comedy. After connecting with Procter's neighbor, a journalist for the Los Angeles Daily News, Feimster began a seven-year career in entertainment journalism. In 2005, she joined The Groundlings Theatre, studying improv and sketch comedy. After four years, she was selected to join the Groundlings' Sunday Company.

Feimster had a supporting role in the 2025 film Zootopia 2 as Nibbles Maplestick, a beaver who is a conspiracy theorist and podcast host; the film was a critical and commercial success.

== Personal life ==
Feimster came out as a lesbian in 2005 at age 25. In 2016, she began dating kindergarten teacher Jacquelyn Smith, becoming engaged in early 2018. She and Smith own homes in Los Angeles and Belmont, North Carolina. They married in a small ceremony on October 23, 2020. In June 2025, Feimster and Smith announced that they had been separated for an unspecified amount of time and were in the process of divorcing.

== Filmography ==
Key
†	Denotes films that have not yet been released

=== Film ===
Film work by Fortune Feimster
Year	Title	Role	Notes	Ref.
2013	The Secret Lives of Dorks	Janitor		
2015	Life in Color	Zoe		
2016	Office Christmas Party	Lonny		
2018	Social Animals	Sarah-Beth		
2018	Father of the Year	Teacher		
2018	The Happytime Murders	Robin		
2020	Deported	Tammy		
2020	Friendsgiving	Fairy Gay Mother		
2020	Chick Fight	Bear		
2020	Soul	Counselor Jerry D	Voice role	
2021	Barb and Star Go to Vista Del Mar	Pinky		
2021	Yes Day	Jean the Paramedic		
2022	Sex Appeal	Mama Suze		
2023	Family Switch	Coach Kim		
2025	You're Cordially Invited	Captain		
2025	Gabby's Dollhouse: The Movie	Kitty Fridge	Voice role	
2025	Zootopia 2	Nibbles Maplestick	Voice role	
2026	The Dink	Esther		
2026	Paw Patrol: The Dino Movie	Eugenia Bunsen	Voice role	
TBA	Judgment Day †	TBA	Post-production	
TBA	The Fifth Wheel †	TBA	Filming	

=== Television ===
Television work by Fortune Feimster
Year	Title	Role	Notes	Ref.
2010	Last Comic Standing	Herself	4 episodes	
2011–2013	After Lately	Herself	14 episodes	
2011–2014	Chelsea Lately	Round table co-host	158 episodes	
2014	2 Broke Girls	Sherlock Mary	"And the Near Death Experience"	
2014	Workaholics	Jo	"Timechair"	
2014	Mulaney	Mary Jo	3 episodes	
2015	Glee	Butch Melman	"We Built This Glee Club"	
2015	Hot Girls Walk By	Ruth	"Visitors in a Hospital"	
2015	Married	Woman on Rascal	"Mother's Day"	
2015	Drunk History	Herself	"New Mexico"	
2015–2017	The Mindy Project	Collette Kimball-Kinney	Main role (Seasons 4–6); 39 episodes	
2016	Go-Go Boy Interrupted	Fortune	Web series	
2016–2019	Life in Pieces	Dougie	7 episodes	
2017	Chelsea	Ann Coulter / Sarah Huckabee Sanders	5 episodes	
2017	The Standups	Herself	Episode: "With Fortune Feimster"	
2017–2018	Nobodies	Libby	2 episodes	
2017–2019	RuPaul's Drag Race	Herself	3 episodes (including "RuPaul Roast" and "L.A.D.P.!")	
2018	Another Period	Garva	3 episodes	
2018	Dear White People	Christine Halberg	"Volume 2: Chapter IV"	
2018	Champions	Ruby	10 episodes	
2018	Claws	Lauren Zorloni	"Crossroads"	
2018	Foursome	Kimmy	"Stay Linked – Get Inked"	
2018	Niko and the Sword of Light	Brohilda (voice)	"The Thorn of Contention"	
2018	The Fix	Herself	"Let's Fix Artificial Intelligence"	
2018–2023	Summer Camp Island	Ava / various (voice)	25 episodes	
2018–2024	Craig of the Creek	Laura Mercer (voice)	7 episodes	
2019	Historical Roasts	Princess Diana	"Freddie Mercury"	
2019	Tales of The City	Carlin	"A Touch o' Butch"	
2019	American Princess	Sherl	"You Can Always Trust Your Vaganya"	
2019	Sunnyside	Michelle Pinholster	"Pants Full of Sandwiches"	
2019	The Simpsons	Evelyn (voice)	"Livin La Pura Vida"	
2019–2020	The L Word: Generation Q	Heather	3 episodes	
2019–2021	Bless the Harts	Brenda (voice)	26 episodes	
2020	Sweet and Salty	Herself	Netflix Stand-Up Special	
2020	Nailed It!	Herself	"The One with the 90's Theme"	
2021	iCarly	Countess Debra	"iGot Your Back"	
2021	The Mighty Ones	Vibez (voice)	"Bumbleberry/Leaf's Still Cool"	
2021	Q-Force	Louisa Deck (voice)	3 episodes	
2021	Awkwafina Is Nora from Queens	Deimos	2 episodes	
2021	RuPaul's Drag Race All Stars	Herself	"Snatch Game of Love"	
2021–2022	Ada Twist, Scientist	Rosie's Mom (voice)	4 episodes	
2021–2022	Kenan	Pam Fox	14 episodes	
2022	Dicktown	(voice)	"The Mystery of the Marauding Mascot"	
2022	Is It Cake?	Herself (judge)	"Fast Food Fakeout"	
2022	Madagascar: A Little Wild	Manager Cow (voice)	"A Lil Baa Country"	
2022–2023	Firebuds	Flip / Flap (voice)	7 episodes	
2023	Schoolhouse Rock! 50th Anniversary Singalong	Herself	the "Unpack Your Adjectives" segment with Kermit the Frog and Fozzie Bear	
2023	Frog and Toad	Lizard (voice)	2 episodes	
2023	Ten Year Old Tom	(voice)	"Crossing Guard/Poker Game"	
2023	Strange Planet	Megafan #1 / Elderly Being #2 (voice)	"The Flying Machine"	
2023	The Morning Show	Comedian	"The Green Light"	
2023–2024	Velma	Olive (voice)	15 episodes	
2023–2025	FUBAR	Ruth/Roo	16 episodes	
2024	The Sex Lives of College Girls	Bus Passenger	"Welcome Back to Essex"	
2025	StuGo	Scrumptious (voice)	"Phishin' Chip/Shell-Shock!"	
2026	The Hawk	Sam	10 episodes	

=== Podcasts ===
Note: (Note: In addition to hosting her own podcast, Sincerely Fortune, and co-cohosting Handsome with Tig Notaro and Mae Martin, Feimster has appeared on the following:)

Podcast work by Fortune Feimster
Year	Title	Role	Notes	Ref.
2018	Bertcast	Herself	"315"	
2019	Queery	Herself	"112"	
2019	The Margaret Cho	Herself	"Fortune Feimster and Jodi Long"	
2020	This Past Weekend	Herself	"254"	
2020	Anna Faris is Unqualified	Herself	"Fortune Feimster"	
2020	Lovett or Leave It	Herself	"Oh, great. Mike Pence."	
2020	The Sporkful	Herself	"You Can't Hate Yourself Constantly" Says Comic Fortune Feimster"	
2020	The Joe Rogan Experience	Herself	"1440"	
2020	Your Mom's House Podcast	Herself	"567"	
2020	Do You Need A Ride?	Herself	Season 2, episode 53	
2021	Good For You	Herself	"92"	
2021	Bertcast	Herself	"496"	
2021	I Said No Gifts!	Herself	"Fortune Feimster Disobeys Bridger"	
2021	Life Is Short with Justin Long	Herself	"138", "Fortune Feimster 😂"	
2021–2023	Comedy Bang! Bang!	Herself	2 episodes	
2022	Scam Goddess	Herself	"120", "The Scammer Hood of the Traveling Wigs w/ Fortune Feimster"	
2022	Don't Ask Tig	Herself	"Fortune Feimster"	
2022	Bertcast	Herself	"544"	
2022	We Can Do Hard Things with Glennon Doyle	Herself	"Fortune Feimster: A Queer Debutante Walks Into a Hooters..."	
2023	Films To Be Buried With with Brett Goldstein	Herself	"Fortune Feimster #278"	
2024	You Made It Weird with Pete Holmes	Herself	"Fortune Feimster and Mae Martin"	
2024	Family Trips with the Meyers Brothers	Herself	"FORTUNE FEIMSTER Almost Got Trampled by Elephants"	
