= K. Asher Levin =

American filmmaker

K. Asher Levin is an American filmmaker. He wrote and directed the 2022 feature film Slayers.

== Filmography ==
Year	Film	Credited as		
Year	Film	Director	Producer	Writer
2002	Sweetie Pie	Yes	No	Yes
2009	Adventures in Online Dating (short film)	Yes	Yes	Yes
2011	Cougars, Inc.	Yes	Yes	Yes
2017	Alexander IRL	Yes	Yes	No
2017	Too Cool for School (TV movie)	Yes	Yes	No
2022	Dig	Yes	Yes	No
2022	Slayers	Yes	Yes	Yes
2023	Helen's Dead	Yes	Yes	Yes
