= Friendsgiving (film) =

2020 film by Nicol Paone

- Theatrical release poster
- Directed by: Nicol Paone
- Written by: Nicol Paone
- Produced by: Malin Åkerman; Haroon Saleem; Ben Stiller; Nicholas Weinstock
- Starring: Malin Åkerman; Kat Dennings; Aisha Tyler; Chelsea Peretti; Christine Taylor; Jane Seymour; Deon Cole; Wanda Sykes; Margaret Cho; Fortune Feimster; Jack Donnelly; Ryan Hansen
- Cinematography: Neil Shapiro
- Edited by: Julie Cohen
- Music by: Jessica Weiss
- Production companies: Endeavor Content; Rhea Films; Red Hour Productions
- Distributed by: Saban Films
- Release date: October 23, 2020 (United States)
- Running time: 95 minutes
- Country: United States
- Language: English
- Box office: $122,039

Friendsgiving is a 2020 American comedy-drama film written and directed by Nicol Paone in her directorial debut, premiering on October 23, 2020, produced by Saban Films. It stars Malin Åkerman, Kat Dennings, Aisha Tyler, Chelsea Peretti, Christine Taylor, Jane Seymour, Deon Cole, Wanda Sykes, Margaret Cho, Fortune Feimster, Jack Donnelly, and Ryan Hansen. The film received generally negative reviews.

== Plot ==
Molly, a movie actress, and Abby are best friends who have planned to spend a quiet Thanksgiving together. Molly has a five-month-old boy and is going through a divorce, while Abby, who came out as lesbian when she was 29 years old, has spent the past year getting over being dumped by her first girlfriend.

What was supposed to be a low-key holiday with just the two of them becomes a large Friendsgiving dinner party after Molly invites her fling boyfriend Jeff to stay for dinner, as well as her and Abby's mutual friend Lauren with her husband and children. Meanwhile, Lauren invites a few single lesbians to the party to help Abby find a new love interest and start dating again.

Molly's estranged mother, Helen, also arrives unannounced from Sweden to stay with her, mend mother–daughter fences, and acquaint herself with her grandchild. Unbeknownst to Molly, Helen has invited Gunnar, a former boyfriend of Molly who stayed in touch with Helen through Facebook.

Other surprise friends and guests also arrive, including Claire, a recently certified shaman who identifies as a "shawoman", Rick and his new wife Brianne who cannot speak audibly due to Botox injections, and Gus, a gay man whose brother has been missing for seven years.

== Cast ==
- Malin Åkerman as Molly
- Kat Dennings as Abby
- Jane Seymour as Helen
- Aisha Tyler as Lauren
- Chelsea Peretti as Claire
- Christine Taylor as Brianne
- Deon Cole as Dan
- Ryan Hansen as Gunnar
- Wanda Sykes, Margaret Cho and Fortune Feimster as Fairy Gay Mothers
- Jack Donnelly as Jeff
- River Butcher as Denim
- Andrew Santino as Rick
- Dana DeLorenzo as Barbara
- Everly and Savannah Sucher as Eden
- Rose Abdoo as Linda, Abby's mother
- Joe Lando as Handsome Man
- Mike Rose as Gus

== Production ==
In May 2018, it was announced Malin Åkerman, Kat Dennings, Jane Seymour, Aisha Tyler, Chelsea Peretti, Christine Taylor, Deon Cole, Ryan Hansen, Wanda Sykes and Margaret Cho, had been cast in the film, with Nicol Paone directing from a screenplay she wrote. Malin Åkerman, Ben Stiller, Nicholas Weinstock and Harmon Saleem will produce the film, under their Red Hour Films and Endeavor Content banners, respectively.

Principal photography began in May 2018. Production concluded on June 4, 2018.

== Release ==
In November 2019, Saban Capital Group acquired the North American distribution rights to the film for its dedicated division, Saban Films. In February 2020, Vertical Entertainment acquired U.K. distribution rights to the film. It was released on October 23, 2020.

== Critical response ==
Friendsgiving holds a 19% approval rating on review aggregator website Rotten Tomatoes, based on 26 reviews, with an average of 4.4/10.

== Home media ==
The film became available as video on demand in the United States on Netflix on January 21, 2021.
