= Brent Rivera =

American YouTuber and actor (born 1998)

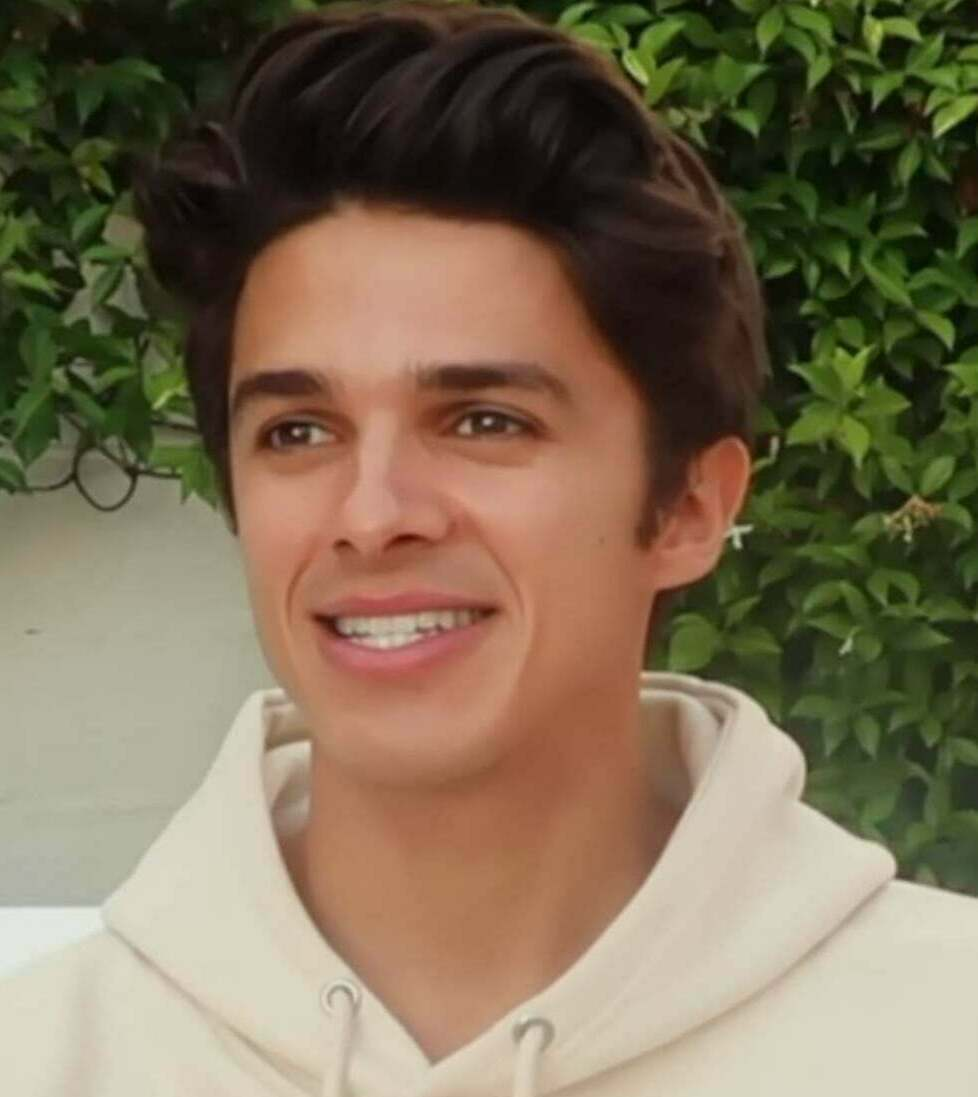
- Rivera in 2020
- Born: Brent Austin Rivera; January 9, 1998 (age 28); Huntington Beach, California, U.S.
- Education: Huntington Beach High School
- Occupations: YouTuber; actor

YouTube information
- Channel: Brent Rivera
- Years active: 2009–present
- Genres: Comedy; vlog
- Subscribers: 42.3 million
- Views: 13 billion
- Last updated: May 25, 2026

Brent Austin Rivera (born January 9, 1998) is an American Internet personality and actor who first gained popularity on the now-defunct video hosting service Vine. He has followings on Instagram, TikTok, and YouTube.

== Biography ==
Brent Austin Rivera was born on January 9, 1998. He has Mexican and Italian ancestry, and is from Huntington Beach, California, where he still lives. Rivera's younger sister, Alexa Brooke "Lexi" Rivera (born June 7, 2001), is also an influencer and appeared with him in the web series Brobot. He also has two older brothers.

Rivera was interested in acting and auditioned for commercials and TV shows in seventh grade. He did not want to be under a producer's oversight, so he started posting on social media platforms such as Instagram, Snapchat and the now defunct Vine in his early teens. Rivera became a prominent Vine star. One selfie earned him 68 thousand likes; academic Alice Marwick wrote that since "Rivera looks like a celebrity, [...] on Instagram, he is treated as one." Because he lives close to Los Angeles, Rivera was able to attend high school and work meetings, something many teenage influencers could not do.

Rivera's father, John, did not pay much attention to his social media until Rivera was recognized at a local hockey game by fans.

Rivera is the co-founder and CEO of Amp Studios, a talent incubator and content group that in 2020 generated 10 billion social media views each month. He also started a pop culture-centric podcast called So Relatable in 2021. In 2015, he participated in Coca-Cola's #MakeItHappy campaign and worked with Hollister Co. in 2019 on their anti-bullying campaign.

== Filmography ==
=== Web roles ===
Year	Title	Role	Network	Notes	Ref.
2017	Alexander IRL	Alexander	YouTube Red	Also producer	
2018	Brobot	Gil	Brat	5 episodes	
2018–2019	Light as a Feather	Issac Salcedo	Hulu	Main role; 2 seasons	
2019	Brent Rivera's Dream Vacation	Himself	AwesomenessTV	7 episodes	

=== Television ===
Year	Title	Role	Network	Notes	Ref.
2020	Group Chat	Himself	Nickelodeon	1 episode (season 1); Main role (season 2)	

== Awards and nominations ==
Year	Award	Category	Result	Ref.
2019	2019 Teen Choice Awards	Choice Male Web Star	Nominated	
2019	9th Streamy Awards	Best in Lifestyle	Nominated	
2020	10th Streamy Awards	Juanpa Zurita's Creator Honor Award	Won	
2021	11th Streamy Awards	Creator Of The Year	Nominated	
2021	11th Streamy Awards	Lifestyle	Nominated	
