= Alexander IRL =

2017 teen dramedy web film

- Promotional poster
- Directed by: K. Asher Levin
- Screenplay by: Brandon Cohen
- Produced by: Rob Fishman; Brent Rivera; K. Asher Levin
- Starring: Nathan Kress; Brent Rivera; Ryan Newman; Bo Mitchell; Marcus Scribner
- Cinematography: Alexander Bergman
- Edited by: Khalie Anderson
- Music by: Taylor Locke; Tim Sommer
- Production company: Blessedly Silent Films
- Distributed by: YouTube Red
- Release date: January 11, 2017
- Running time: 86 minutes
- Country: United States
- Languages: English; Spanish

Alexander IRL is a 2017 American teen comedy-drama web film directed by K. Asher Levin and written by Brandon Cohen. It stars Nathan Kress, Brent Rivera, Ryan Newman, Bo Mitchell, and Marcus Scribner. Produced by Rob Fishman, Levin, and Rivera, it follows a socially enclosed trio named Alexander Finn, Darius, and Stuart (Rivera, Mitchell and Scribner) trying to form their own alter ego by throwing a party and as Alex's brother EJ (Kress) begs him to make an app prototype involving his party. The latter word of the title is an Internet acronym for 'in real life'.

The film was announced in July 2016, with filming occurring shortly after. Internet personalities like Rivera were cast to increase viewership of the film, primarily targeting teenagers. With technology being a recurring motif in the film, production gained partnership with the companies like General Electric, as part of an effort to increase awareness on the industrial internet of things. After a month of delay, Alexander IRL was released on YouTube Red on January 11, 2017, and received mixed reviews on its plot.

== Plot ==
Alexander Finn is a high school student, befriending fellow outcasts Darius and Stuart. Alex has a crush on a girl named Lo, whom popular student Cole Winnard has a crush on too. One day, multimedia teacher Mr. Eskin announces a presentation project, with the theme 'you.' Alex's big brother EJ works at a venture company participating in an app creation challenge using General Electric's cloud to enhance everyday lives. EJ keeps encouraging colleague Ellie to use his ideas, wanting to be the next Mark Zuckerberg.

One day, while Alex and EJ's parents go on a honeymoon out of town, Stu encourages Alex to impress Lo by throwing a party, so that he can give a good impression of himself in his presentation. Meanwhile, Ellie accepts one of EJ's ideas that prevents phone addiction and climate change, and tells EJ to submit a prototype. Alex reveals to EJ about their plan and agrees on a quid pro quo, with EJ asking him to create the prototype and tell the party comers to install it and turn their phones off as a test run. After failed attempts by EJ's party organizer friend Nine, EJ invites students directly, and the party becomes trending on Twitter, bolstering the trio's popularity. Meanwhile, the prototype, Cloud Maximizer 2.0, is finished and accepted.

At the party, everyone agrees on the phone rule. EJ invites colleague Owen Reed, Ellie, and the envious Jonathan to the party. Due to the boisterous mood, Cole, who was known for organizing parties, lost his social status. As a revenge, he gaslights Lo by revealing the mission behind the party after he eavesdropped Darius slamming Alex for caring more about the party mission than him. Jonathan secretly calls the cops for underage drinking. After a raid, EJ and Owen are arrested but released the next day. Lo dumps Alex.

Mr. Eskin tells the class that the presentation is tomorrow, and Alex quickly makes it. As part of his presentation, he apologizes to everyone that is mad at him for his ego, realizing that him masking his true self does not make him seem any better. EJ then appears on stage, announcing the app: IRL (Internet acronym for 'in real life'). After the presentation, Mr. Eskin, Nine, and EJ team up as the founders of IRL. Lo and Alex reconcile, and they become friends back with Darius, and Stu.

== Cast ==
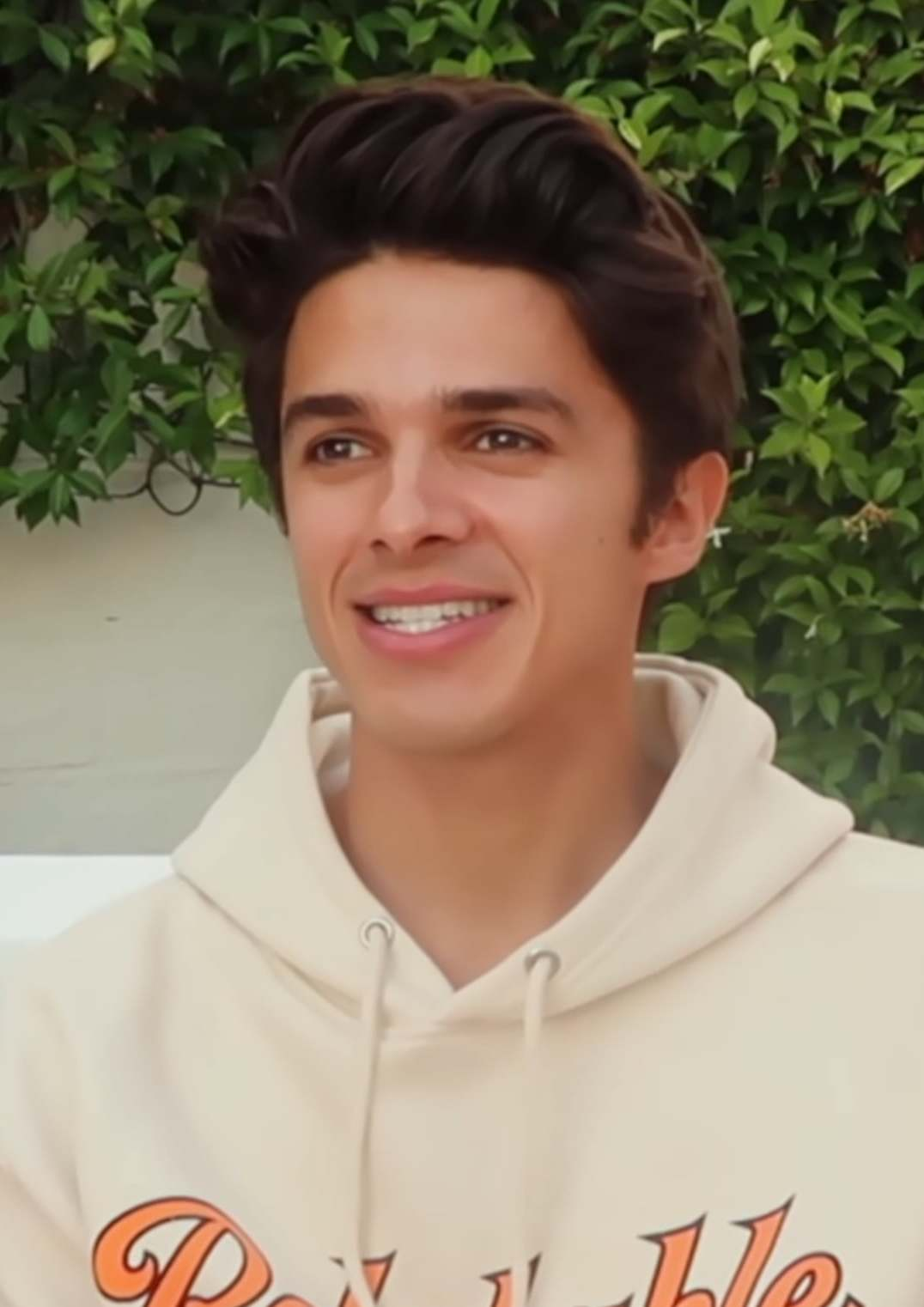
Brent Rivera (pictured 2020) portrays Alexander Finn

- Brent Rivera as Alexander Finn
- Nathan Kress as EJ
- Bo Mitchell as Stuart
- Marcus Scribner as Darius
- Ryan Newman as Lo
- Sarah Gilman as Jamie, Lo's friend
- James Eckhouse as Arthur, Alex and EJ's dad
- Melanie Chartoff as Maurine, Alex and EJ's mom
- Simon Rex as Owen Reed
- Ryan Pinkston as Jonathan
- Jason Nash as Mr. Eskin
- Brennen Taylor as Cole Winnard
- Kevin Iso as Nine

== Production ==
On July 20, 2016, Dave McNary of Variety announced that Kress and Rivera, both being internet personalities, would be starring in an independent teen comedy film titled Alexander IRL, which would start shooting the same week of publication in Los Angeles. K. Asher Levin, the film's director, adapted a screenplay by Brandon Cohen. Rob Fishman, Levin and Rivera become the film's producers. The production team said that they will also be partnering with GE and startups BarkBox, Jack Threads, and Warby Parker. In an interview with director of innovation San Olstein, he said that the film is experimental to GE, and that it makes the industrial internet of things more relatable to a much younger segment than they usually reach out to. They were introduced to the film's synopsis by Fishman.

In order to gain audiences, Levin explained that "The idea was to bring someone like Brent, who has such an incredible reach with people 12-18 and above, to get them to watch one of these movies. Brent allowed us to have a whole captive audience." Levin cited classic teen coming-of-age films, John Hughes' films like American Graffiti (1973), and Dazed and Confused (1993) as influences on the film's narrative, whose theme is "about how young people today are so glued to their phones and to social media," that their online life essentially becomes an alter ego. Being in his first feature film, Rivera faced various pressures, most notably on the schedules and to show up on set, something he doesn't need to be concerned of when making online videos. Rivera reflected on the friendship between all the cast and crew members, that the film's production was like "a big hangout ses[sion]."

In an interview, Rivera and Scribner expressed relatability with the characters they portray. Rivera says he is similar to Alex, an enclosed teenager excessively sticking to his phone, with a narrow social circle. "I think what Alex did [i]s break out of his shell, [and] I get that to a point." However, he stated that the later actions his character does in the film is "not something I would really do." He said that the scene where Alex kisses Lo is his favorite scene to act on. Meanwhile, Scribner reflected on the nerdy traits Darius has. However he said, "I think that's where the similarities kind of taper off, because Darius does not like to have fun. I like to have a bit of fun from time to time." Scribner said that the entire party scene is his favorite part of the film.

== Release ==
On November 18, McNary learned exclusively that the film will be posted on YouTube Red on December 14. Levin states that they're "thrilled that YouTube Red Originals shares our vision of bringing back the teen films that our generation grew up on." The teaser was posted on July 25, 2016, just six days after the Variety announcement, on a channel called Alexander IRL. It features a sliding shot of the three main characters showing off at their school corridor, with the song "We're on Fire" by Airplane Man. The official trailer was then posted on Brent's channel on January 5. There, it is stated to be released on January 11, which contradicts Variety's statement.

A website for the film was made, with the film able to be watched with charge. It is also available on various video on demand platforms, including Amazon Prime Video, Google Play, Vudu, as well as iTunes.

== Reception ==
Brian Castello of Common Sense Media gave the film a 1 out of 5 stars, stating that "While the movie tries to make a perhaps satirical comment on how teens in particular live more through their smartphones than they do 'IRL,' this message gets muddied in what amounts to an incoherent story and unfunny comedy." He pointed the lack of a coherent storyline and "a single 'LOL' moment." He opined that YouTube Red "is determined to put out the worst movies they possibly can, and with this one they keep this trend going." Saying that it is "amateur filmmaking at its absolute worst," Castello thought, "the movie's themes contradict and double-back on themselves so much, it no longer remotely matters what the overall point is, assuming there even is a point."

In another side, Brandchannel wrote that "projects like Alexander IRL are quietly redefining how movies go from idea to audience." It noted that the film is more targeted towards audiences of the young demographic, "whose lives intermingle streaming scripted material with Hollywood films and social-generated content", rather than the old.
