= Group Chat (talk show) =

American reality television program

- Logo for the second season
- Genre: Reality
- Starring: Annie LeBlanc; Jayden Bartels; Brent Rivera
- Country of origin: United States
- Original language: English
- No. of seasons: 2
- No. of episodes: 15

Production
- Camera setup: Webcam
- Running time: 23 minutes
- Production company: Nickelodeon Productions

Original release
- Network: Nickelodeon
- Release: May 23 – October 31, 2020

Group Chat is an American reality television program that aired on Nickelodeon from May 23 to October 31, 2020. It was co-hosted by Annie LeBlanc and Jayden Bartels in its first season, and was hosted by Bartels and Brent Rivera in its second season.

== Overview ==
The program follows the hosts who play games, compete in challenges, and communicate with their guests, virtually via online chat.

== Production ==
Group Chat with Annie & Jayden logo; used (only) for the first season

On May 6, 2020, it was announced that the show was greenlit under the title Group Chat: The Show to be hosted by Annie LeBlanc and Jayden Bartels, along with Nickelodeon's Unfiltered in the midst of the COVID-19 pandemic, necessitating remote filming, with the show premiering as Group Chat with Annie & Jayden on May 23, 2020.

On August 27, 2020, it was announced that Nickelodeon had ordered seven additional episodes for the series, that began airing on September 5. Previous series guest star Brent Rivera succeeded LeBlanc's previous co-host spot.

== Episodes ==
=== Series overview ===
Season	Episodes	Originally released	
Season	Episodes	First released	Last released
1	6	May 23, 2020	June 27, 2020
2	9	September 5, 2020	October 31, 2020

=== Season 1 (2020) ===
No. overall	No. in season	Title	Original release date	Prod. code	U.S. viewers (millions)
Group Chat with Annie & Jayden
1	1	"Brush Your Teeth With Mayo"	May 23, 2020	101	0.48
Guest stars: Brent Rivera, Johnny Orlando
2	2	"Slime Into Your DMs"	May 30, 2020	102	0.43
Guest stars: Anna Cathcart, Peyton List
3	3	"There's A Cockroach In My Room"	June 6, 2020	103	0.31
Guest stars: Baby Ariel, Gabrielle Nevaeh Green
4	4	"Sailing Sausages"	June 13, 2020	104	0.30
Guest stars: Alex Wassabi, Ben Simmons
5	5	"Confetti Clean Up"	June 20, 2020	105	0.25
Guest stars: Sofia Carson, Wolfgang Novogratz
6	6	"Would You Rather Kiss"	June 27, 2020	106	0.31
Guest stars: Joel Courtney, Joey King, Maisie Richardson-Sellers, Taylor Zakhar Perez

=== Season 2 (2020) ===
No. overall	No. in season	Title	Original release date	Prod. code	U.S. viewers (millions)
Group Chat with Jayden & Brent (episode 1–6 & 9)
Group Chat with Young Dylan and That Girl Lay Lay (episode 7 & 8)
7	1	"Sleepover – Duck Duck Poop"	September 5, 2020	107	0.27
Guest stars: Havan Flores, Terrence Little Gardenhigh
8	2	"Group Chat Unleashed – Party Pooper Prank"	September 12, 2020	108	0.33
Guest stars: Iain Armitage, Miles Brown
9	3	"Getting Physical – Tarantula Treats & A Sports Drink Shower"	September 19, 2020	109	0.26
Guest stars: Tony Hawk, Sky Brown
10	4	"Party Time – Wrap Battle"	September 26, 2020	110	0.27
Guest stars: That Girl Lay Lay, Young Dylan
11	5	"Dance Dance Fart"	October 3, 2020	111	0.26
Guest stars: Asher Angel, Sky Katz
12	6	"BFFs – Spill The Slime Tea"	October 10, 2020	112	0.35
Guest stars: Lexi Rivera, Ben Azelart
13	7	"The Takeover Part 1: Donut-Filled Surprise"	October 17, 2020	114	0.29
Hosts: That Girl Lay Lay, Young Dylan Guest stars: Kate Godfrey, Nathan Janak
14	8	"The Takeover Part 2: Tater Tot Toss"	October 24, 2020	115	0.38
Hosts: That Girl Lay Lay, Young Dylan Guest stars: Miya Cech, Bryce Gheisar
15	9	"Halloween – Sliming For Apples"	October 31, 2020	113	0.35
Guest stars: Lilimar Hernandez, Paris Berelc

== Ratings ==
Viewership and ratings per season of Group Chat
Season	Episodes	First aired		Last aired		Avg. viewers (millions)
Season	Episodes	Date	Viewers (millions)	Date	Viewers (millions)	Avg. viewers (millions)
1	6	May 23, 2020	0.48	June 27, 2020	0.31	0.35
2	9	September 5, 2020	0.27	October 31, 2020	0.35	0.31
