= Slayers (film) =

2022 film by K. Asher Levin

- Theatrical release poster
- Directed by: K. Asher Levin
- Screenplay by: K. Asher Levin; Zack Imbrogno
- Story by: K. Asher Levin
- Produced by: Abigail Breslin; K. Asher Levin; Daniel Cummings; Zack Imbrogno; Rob Goodrich; Jason Armstrong
- Starring: Thomas Jane; Kara Hayward; Jack Donnelly; Lydia Hearst; Malin Akerman; Abigail Breslin; Ash T
- Cinematography: Owen Levelle
- Edited by: Marc Fusco; Vahik Pirhamzei; Álex Rodríguez
- Music by: Taylor Locke
- Production company: Buffalo 8
- Distributed by: The Avenue Entertainment
- Release date: October 21, 2022
- Running time: 88 minutes
- Country: United States
- Language: English
- Box office: $40,120

Slayers is a 2022 American comedy horror film, written, produced and directed by K. Asher Levin. It stars Thomas Jane, Kara Hayward, Jack Donnelly, Lydia Hearst, Malin Akerman, and Abigail Breslin. The film was released in theaters and digitally on October 21, 2022, by The Avenue Entertainment.

== Plot ==
The stream team (Flynn, Jack, Liz, and Jules) are a group of famous influencers who have been invited to the home of Stephen Rektor, a billionaire media mogul and pharmaceutical engineer. Unbeknownst to the stream team, Rektor and his family are actually vampires.

En route to the mansion the team meets Elliot Jones, a former television personality who lost his daughter to a vampire attack. Elliot warns the stream team about Rektor but the team dismisses his warning as paranoid ramblings.

At the mansion, the team is quickly separated. David, the team's manager, is tricked by Beverly Rektor and killed. Liz and Jack (who are a couple) are given lucrative offers to work for Rektor promoting a vaccine that will make the world immune to disease, but actually purifies the blood of humanity for vampiric consumption.

Jules is lured to the stables by Harry Rektor with the promise of a date. Flynn (who is Jack's sister), had earlier sensed that something was amiss and discovers Jules being attacked by Harry. Jules is mauled to death by Harry, but Harry is killed when Elliot shows up. Flynn and Elliot then retreat to Elliot's camper where he explains the history of the vampires.

Meanwhile, in the mansion, Liz is given an injection that turns her into a vampire by Beverly while Jack enters a VR world where he meets Stephen Rektor, the vampire leader and Dark Lord.

Stephen and Beverly live forever by drinking blood but also by transferring their blood to another host as their bodies do eventually wear down. Liz and Jack have been chosen as replacements for Stephen and Beverly's old hosts.

Flynn and Elliot assault the mansion in the hope of saving Jack. After overpowering their henchman, they encounter Beverly (who has transferred her blood and spirit into Liz) guarding Stephen and Jack who have not completed their transfer.

Even though Stephen wakes up before the transfer is completed, Elliot and Flynn manage to knock out both Beverly and Stephen. Not knowing any other way to kill a Dark Lord vampire, Elliot elects to stay behind with a bomb as Jack and Flynn escape.

In a post credits scene it is revealed that Elliot was successful in killing Stephen, Beverly and the other vampires and that Jack and Flynn made it to safety.

== Cast ==
- Thomas Jane as Elliot Jones
- Kara Hayward as Flynn Chambers
- Jack Donnelly as Jack Chambers
- Lydia Hearst as Liz Andrews
- Ash T as David Dean
- Malin Akerman as Beverly Rektor
- Abigail Breslin as Jules Ray

== Production ==
In June 2020, it was announced that Kara Hayward, Lydia Hearst, and Jack Donnelly had joined the cast of the horror film With Teeth, with K. Asher Levin directing from a screenplay he wrote, and serving as a producer, with Malin Akerman set to executive produce and eyeing a key role. In September 2020, the film was retitled Slayers, and Abigail Breslin, Åkerman, and Thomas Jane joined the cast, with Breslin serving as a producer and Jane as an executive producer.

Filming took place in Albuquerque, New Mexico in November 2020, during the COVID-19 pandemic.

== Release ==
The film was released in theaters and digitally on October 21, 2022, by The Avenue Entertainment.

=== Critical reception ===
On the review aggregator website Rotten Tomatoes, 22% of 9 critics' reviews are positive, with an average rating of 4/10.

=== Box office ===
As of April 7, 2024, Slayers grossed $40,120 in Russia.
