= The Aviary (2022 film) =

- Theatrical release poster
- Directed by: Chris Cullari; Jennifer Raite
- Screenplay by: Chris Cullari; Jennifer Raite
- Produced by: Marcei A. Brown; Andrew Miller; Jessica Rhoades; Jeanette Volturno
- Starring: Malin Akerman; Sandrine Holt; Lorenza Izzo; Chris Messina
- Cinematography: Elie Smolkin
- Edited by: David Bilow
- Music by: Zac Clark
- Production companies: The Forest Road Company; Catchlight Studios; Stagecoach Entertainment; Pacesetter Productions International
- Distributed by: Saban Films
- Release date: April 29, 2022
- Running time: 96 minutes
- Country: United States
- Language: English

The Aviary is a 2022 American thriller film written and directed by Chris Cullari and Jennifer Raite. It stars Malin Akerman, Sandrine Holt, Lorenza Izzo, and Chris Messina.

It was released on April 29, 2022, by Saban Films to mixed reviews from critics.

== Plot ==
Two women escape from a dangerous cult into the New Mexican desert. They fear the cult's charming and controlling leader might be following them. With dwindling supplies and fraying nerves, they must confront the challenge of evading an enemy who seems to haunt their thoughts.

== Cast ==
- Malin Akerman as Jillian
- Sandrine Holt as Delilah
- Lorenza Izzo as Blair
- Chris Messina as Seth

== Production ==
The Aviary was written and directed by Chris Cullari and Jennifer Raite in their feature film debut. The cult portrayed in the film was inspired by NXIVM and Theranos.

In addition to starring in the film, Akerman also served as executive producer.

== Release ==
In December 2021, Saban Films acquired distribution rights to the film for North America, the U.K., Ireland, Australia, New Zealand, and South Africa. It was released on April 29, 2022.

== Reception ==
On Rotten Tomatoes, The Aviary has a 63% approval rating based on 27 reviews, and an average rating of 5.7/10. The site's critical consensus reads, "The Aviary's adroitly assembled cast lends extra weight to an uneven depiction of how dangerous cults can be." On Metacritic, which assigns a weighted average rating reviews from mainstream critics, the film has a score of 57 out of 100, based on seven critics, indicating "mixed or average" reviews.

Noel Murray of the Los Angeles Times praised the cast and considered the film a "strong feature filmmaking debut" from Cullari and Raite. Murray wrote, "If anything, the movie's biggest weakness is that much of the running time consists of Jillian and Blair's exhausted conversations out in the wilderness ... But an excellent cast and some skillful direction goes a long way toward making The Aviary feel genuinely revealing." Steve Davis of The Austin Chronicle wrote, "[The movie is] eventually undermined by an ever-exhausting concept that might have worked better as an hourlong episode in an anthology series. With a little fine-tuning, the ending would have packed a bigger wallop in a truncated version eliminating a coda that only serves to explain the title. "
