= Jack Donnelly =

English actor (born 1985)

- Born: 28 October 1985 (age 39); Bournemouth, England
- Occupation: Actor
- Years active: 2010–present
- Spouse: Malin Akerman (m. 2018)

Jack Donnelly (born 28 October 1985) is an English actor, best known for his role in BBC series Atlantis, in which he played the role of Jason.

== Early life ==
Donnelly was born the first of four boys in Bournemouth on 28 October 1985, the son of Chrissy Wickham and Tony Donnelly. His mother was the choreographer of Bucks Fizz's winning dance routine at the 1981 Eurovision Song Contest, as well as an actress and former Hot Gossip dance troupe member. He was raised primarily in Ringwood, Hampshire. He attended St Catherine's Primary School in Wimborne Minster, Dorset, and then St Peter's School in Bournemouth. He later joined the Big Little Theatre School in Bournemouth.

== Career ==
Donnelly is a founding member of the improvisational comedy group "Chuckle Duster", which performs occasionally in east London.

Donnelly's first acting was as Jason Winkler in Nickelodeon's TV series House of Anubis. He then guest starred in shows such as Doctors, Threesome, Misfits, Dancing on the Edge. In 2013, he landed a lead role in BBC's fantasy series Atlantis, where he played the role of Jason who washes up on the shores of the ancient and mysterious city of Atlantis. In 2014, he played the role of a cocky footballer Olly Hunter in the wholly improvised spoof documentary United We Fall. In 2016, he guest starred as Samuel Walker in the TV series Death in Paradise.

In 2017, Donnelly played lead role of Prince Adrian in the Hallmark original movie A Royal Winter alongside Merritt Patterson.

== Personal life ==
In October 2017, Donnelly became engaged to Swedish actress Malin Akerman. They were married in Tulum on 1 December 2018.

== Filmography ==
=== Film ===
Year	Title	Role	Notes
2014	United We Fall	Olly Hunter	
2020	Friendsgiving	Jeff	
2022	Slayers	Jack Chambers	

=== Television ===
Year	Title	Role	Notes
2011	House of Anubis	Jason Winkler	Recurring; 30 Episodes
2012	Doctors	Harry Kilber-Bennett	Episode: "Sentence"
2012	Threesome	Pull / Paul	Episode: "Vacuum"
2012	Misfits	White Rabbit	Episode #4.6
2013	Dancing on the Edge	Leopold	Episode #4
2013–2015	Atlantis	Jason	Lead Role; 25 Episodes
2016	Death in Paradise	Samuel Walker	Episode: "The Blood Red Sea"
2017	A Royal Winter	Prince Adrian	TV film
