= Helen's Dead =

2023 film by K. Asher Levin

- Theatrical release poster
- Directed by: K. Asher Levin
- Screenplay by: Amy Brown Carver
- Story by: K. Asher Levin; Amy Brown Carver
- Produced by: K. Asher Levin; Daniel Cummings; Robert Dean; Roy Scott McFarland; Todd Lundbohm; Rob Goodrich; Jason Armstrong
- Starring: Annabelle Dexter-Jones; Tyrese Gibson; Emile Hirsch; Dylan Gelula; Oliver Cooper
- Production company: Stoked Film Group
- Distributed by: Screen Media
- Release date: November 3, 2023
- Country: United States
- Language: English

Helen's Dead is a 2023 American comedy mystery film directed by K. Asher Levin for a screenplay by Amy Brown Carver and story she co-wrote with Levin. It stars Annabelle Dexter-Jones, Tyrese Gibson, Emile Hirsch, Dylan Gelula and Oliver Cooper.

== Plot ==
When a woman discovers that her boyfriend is sleeping with her cousin Helen she plans to confront them at a dinner party, only to find that Helen is dead and everyone there is a suspect.

== Cast ==
- Annabelle Dexter-Jones as Leila
- Emile Hirsch as Adam
- Dylan Gelula as Addie
- Oliver Cooper as Garret
- Tyrese Gibson as Henry
- Matilda Lutz as Helen
- Beth Dover as Molly
- Brian Huskey as George

== Production ==
Principal photography took place in Santa Fe, New Mexico in December 2021. In February 2022, the film entered in post-production.

== Release ==
In September 2023, Screen Media acquired all North American distribution rights and set a release for November 3, 2023, in the "top 10 markets".

== Reception ==
On the review aggregator website Rotten Tomatoes, 17% of 6 critics' reviews are positive, with an average rating of 3.6/10.
