= Nicol Paone =

American comedian, director, writer, and actress

- Occupations: Comedian, director, writer, actress
- Years active: 1998–present

Nicol Paone is an American comedian, director, writer, and actress.

== Background ==
Nicol Paone is an alumna of the Groundlings Sunday Company. In addition to performing on The Big Gay Sketch Show, she has been on Punk'd, Funny or Die, and had a role in the 2009 film Funny People as George's sister. Paone is also a member of the sketch comedy troupe The Deviants.

Paone wrote and directed the 2020 comedy film Friendsgiving. She directed the 2023 film The Kill Room.

Paone is bisexual.
