= List of Andi Mack episodes =

Andi Mack is an American family comedy-drama television series created by Terri Minsky that premiered on Disney Channel on April 7, 2017. It ran for three seasons and 57 episodes, concluding on July 26, 2019. The series stars Peyton Elizabeth Lee, Joshua Rush, Sofia Wylie, Asher Angel, Lilan Bowden, Lauren Tom, and Trent Garrett. It follows 13-year-old Andi Mack and her best friends, Cyrus Goodman and Buffy Driscoll, as they attend middle school.

Andi Mack is the top-rated series on cable television among children ages 6–14. It is the first series on Disney Channel to feature a gay main character, Cyrus Goodman, a distinction that has drawn considerable media attention and was reported in the news as "history". The series has been nominated for and won awards for his coming out storyline, the introduction of which caused a ratings surge.

== Series overview ==
| Season | Episodes | Originally released | |
| Season | Episodes | First released | Last released |
|---|---|---|---|
| 1 | 12 | April 7, 2017 | June 23, 2017 |
| 2 | 25 | October 27, 2017 | August 13, 2018 |
| 3 | 20 | October 8, 2018 | July 26, 2019 |

== Episodes ==
=== Season 1 (2017) ===
| No. overall | No. in season | Title | Directed by | Written by | Original release date | Prod. code | U.S. viewers (millions) |
|---|---|---|---|---|---|---|---|
| 1 | 1 | "13" | Paul Hoen | Terri Minsky | April 7, 2017 | 101 | 1.24 |
| 2 | 2 | "Outside the Box" | Paul Hoen | Terri Minsky | April 7, 2017 | 102 | 1.24 |
As Andi Mack celebrates her 13th birthday, she gets a surprise visit from her older sister, Bex, who announces she will be moving back in with their parents, Celia and Ham. Andi is thrilled about the news and wants to know what Bex has been up to. Bex shares a box of her memories with Andi, though before she does, Celia warns her about the secrets inside, which she wants to keep from Andi. When Bex later discovers Andi is smitten with a boy named Jonah Beck, she arranges to have Jonah give her a Frisbee lesson. Jonah realizes how skilled at Frisbee Andi becomes and asks her to join the Frisbee team at school, but as she decides whether to do so, she discovers he has a girlfriend named Amber. Feeling humiliated, Andi gets upset at Bex, who tells her it is okay not to be perfect. Andi feels better after Jonah texts her. Meanwhile, against Celia's warning, Bex shows Andi a picture hidden deep inside the box which shows Andi as a baby and Bex holding her. Andi finds out the truth: her sister is actually her mother. This infuriates Celia and Ham, but they know they must come to terms with this revelation. After taking time to process this huge change in her life, Andi eventually becomes curious about who her father is, but Bex is not ready to tell her yet. It prompts Andi to take the box to see whether her father's picture is inside it. Andi tells her friends Cyrus and Buffy that she has joined the school frisbee team with Jonah, but has yet to tell them about the more important, life-changing discovery concerning her and Bex. While hanging with Andi in her shack, Cyrus and Buffy come across the picture of Bex with the newborn Andi, concluding Bex has a "secret baby" but not knowing that baby is Andi. Meanwhile, Bex tries to fit in at dinner when Andi, Celia and Ham play a memory game during the meal. Andi tries to impress Jonah by giving him a bracelet she made, a gesture which upsets Amber as she sees the two together. Later, when Cyrus and Buffy keep harping about the secret baby, Andi reveals to them that she is the secret baby while also telling them that Amber is wearing the bracelet she gave to Jonah. Both Andi and Amber stare at each other for several minutes, diverting the attention away from the secret baby talk. Cyrus and Buffy eventually get back to Andi's revelation and have some questions about it. Guest stars: Stoney Westmoreland as Ham, Emily Skinner as Amber, Anson Bagley as Gus Note: Disney Channel premiered these episodes as part of a double-length special episode titled "Tomorrow Starts Today", but they have subsequently been aired and sold as separate regular-length episodes titled "13" and "Outside the Box".
| 3 | 3 | "Shhh!" | David Warren | Erin Dunlap | April 14, 2017 | 103 | 1.19 |
Since the revelation that Bex is Andi's mother, Celia still does not want Andi to call her by different grandmother names. After seeing Mrs. Devlin is the librarian at Andi's school, and recalling that has not changed since she went there, Bex encourages Andi into watching scary movies, which Celia has kept Andi from experiencing. That evening, Andi watches a movie called Shhh!, with Bex there in case she gets too scared, though Bex ends up falling asleep. The movie indeed scares Andi so much, that the next day, she falls asleep in class and receives detention, which prevents her from attending her first Space Otters frisbee match with Jonah. Andi finds out detention is held in the library with Mrs. Devlin, whose "shhh" to quiet her winds up re-triggering her frightened state from the movie. Meanwhile, Buffy joins the track and field relay team and her obsession with winning becomes costly. Later, as Bex goes through a box of things from her youth, and Andi learns more about her, Andi also stumbles across a picture of someone from Bex's past whom she believes to be her father. Guest star: Chelsea T. Zhang as Brittany
| 4 | 4 | "Dancing in the Dark" | Paul Hoen | Phil Baker | April 21, 2017 | 104 | 1.27 |
After Andi questions Bex about the identify of the man in the photo she found, Bex is hesitant and continues avoiding discussion about Andi's father. Cyrus reveals the truth about Bex being Andi's mother to his mother, who later spreads the word across town. Andi receives supportive comments from Jonah and other students at her school, while Celia has an even harder time coping with the relationship change after her neighbor calls her "grandma", which leads her and Ham to take time away from home. In their absence, Bex persuades Andi to have her first party at the house. The party is attended by Andi's schoolmates, Jonah, and even Amber. It turns sour when Amber wants to know who Andi's real father is and asks Andi to reveal him to the guests, causing Andi to retreat to Andi Shack. As Bex starts talking to Andi, Cyrus warns them that Celia and Ham have returned, and the partygoers are told to leave. After Ham sends Andi to bed, Bex tells him that Andi has been persistent with questions about her father. Ham tells Bex that the man who fathered Andi knows she exists, because he told him. Guest stars: Stoney Westmoreland as Ham, Emily Skinner as Amber, Chelsea T. Zhang as Brittany, Garren Stitt as Marty
| 5 | 5 | "It's Not About You" | Joe Menendez | Rayna McClendon | April 28, 2017 | 105 | 1.40 |
Bex is shocked that Ham informed Andi's father about Andi, but Ham made it clear that he needed to know and Andi needs to know about him. When Andi later questions Ham about her father, however, she gets no information. Although Ham has given Bex the email address of Andi's father, all that comes out of any communication is "hey". Meanwhile, Jonah sets up Cyrus on a date with a girl named Iris, as part of a double date with Jonah and Amber. It goes sour when Cyrus gets sick on a carnival ride. Buffy gets into trouble at school over her curly hair and is told by the vice principal to change it. This leads to her not hanging out with Andi, who starts asking questions after she sees Buffy and Bex talking at the Fringe. It boils over when Andi sees the two in the bathroom at home, but she finds out none of what is going on is about her. Buffy reveals to Andi that she messed up her hair while using a flatiron to straighten it and she went to Bex to have her hair fixed, since Buffy's mother is overseas. Andi later gives Bex a lesson on how to properly throw a frisbee. After Bex lets one fly, Andi goes to retrieve it and then sees Amber with a guy, but it is not Jonah. Guest stars: Stoney Westmoreland as Ham, Emily Skinner as Amber, Molly Jackson as Iris Absent: Lauren Tom as Celia Mack
| 6 | 6 | "She Said, She Said" | Paul Hoen | Suzanne Weber | May 5, 2017 | 106 | 1.41 |
After Andi tells Jonah about seeing Amber with another guy, Jonah tells her he will be okay. When she later receives texts to see him at his school locker, Andi rushes to meet him but also confronts Amber, who actually texted her from Jonah's phone and makes her out to be a liar. Hurt by Amber's actions, Andi questions whether she should be talking to Jonah, even though he feels bad about what happened. She contemplates staying home from school and gets help from Cyrus and Buffy to make her sick. Meanwhile, Celia sees Bex is becoming more responsible around the house and later notices her working at the Fringe. Celia also notices Brittany, whom Bex babysat years ago, is Bex's boss. While running track, Buffy meets a familiar face from Andi's party, Marty, who informs her that she is the fastest female runner at school. She finds herself in competition with Marty, who has the school's overall fastest time. As Andi, Bex and Celia argue over Andi's going to school, they hear the doorbell. Bex answers to find a man at the door; it is Bowie, Andi's father. Bex introduces the two, informing them of their relationship, and they look at each other in surprise. Guest stars: Emily Skinner as Amber, Chelsea T. Zhang as Brittany, Garren Stitt as Marty, Trent Garrett as Bowie
| 7 | 7 | "Dad Influence" | Jerry O'Connell | Elena Song | May 12, 2017 | 107 | 1.49 |
Bowie is excited to know his daughter Andi by spending the day with her, but Celia reminds them it is a school day. Bowie manages to get Andi excused from school, right after she learns from Cyrus and Buffy that Jonah and Amber have broken up, and Jonah approaches her with news she hopes is good. When Cyrus and Buffy later realize Andi is not around, they text her to ask where she is and what Jonah told her, but Andi is wondering as much about Jonah and asks her friends to find out. They end up meddling instead, with Cyrus convincing Jonah to follow his heart, despite his insecurities from the break-up, hoping it will lead him to Andi. Meanwhile, Bowie makes the most of his day with Andi, but when she worries about Jonah, Bowie drives her back to school. After she discovers Jonah and Amber have reconciled, she asks Cyrus and Buffy how this could happen, but the two keep silent about their involvement. Andi also tells them she spent the day with her father, while feeling guilty about cutting their day short, realizing he had only the one day, since he is a traveling musician. After Andi talks with Bex about Bowie and learns more about their relationship, the two discover Bowie in Andi's shack. Guest stars: Stoney Westmoreland as Ham, Emily Skinner as Amber, Trent Garrett as Bowie
| 8 | 8 | "Terms of Embarrassment" | Adam Weissman | Sam Wolfson | May 19, 2017 | 108 | 1.48 |
Bowie decides to delay joining his 40-city tour with The Renaissance Boys to be with Andi and Bex, but Celia allows him to stay at the Mack house for only two days. During his extended stay, Bowie meets Andi's friends at school and her teammates on the Space Otters. He records a video with them in it and asks Andi about the boy she keeps talking about, but she feels uncomfortable about her father being around her all the time. On the other hand, Celia is having a change of heart about Bowie after he cooks one of her mother's recipes. Bex and Bowie later have a serious talk at the place the two were last together before their split, with Bowie wanting to be in Andi and Bex's lives more; Bex assures him that he is already a part of their lives. Meanwhile, Cyrus gets offended over a text from Jonah which called him "girly". Buffy works on making Cyrus more like a man, but when Cyrus later asks Jonah about the text, Jonah tells him that autocorrect messed up the text and he really meant to send "gnarly". Bowie starts to realize he has overstayed his welcome after Andi catches him in her bedroom on her computer and wants him not to invade her privacy. When Bex looks at Andi's computer, she sees the video that Bowie made and gets emotional. That prompts Andi to take a look as well and to talk with Bowie afterward, only to find him gone. Guest stars: Stoney Westmoreland as Ham, Trent Garrett as Bowie
| 9 | 9 | "She's Turning into You" | Michael Grossman | Erin Dunlap | June 2, 2017 | 109 | 1.41 |
Andi misses Bowie, and Bex helps to cheer her up. The two buy a variety of vintage clothes, which Celia disapproves, causing her to start questioning Bex's being back home. After enjoying quality time with Bex, Andi begins to wonder why her mother left home at the time of her birth, and while Bex does not reveal any details to Andi, things come out at home when Celia suggests that Bex move out. Meanwhile, Andi is concerned after Jonah passes her in the hallway at school without saying anything. She talks to him to find things are still okay between them. She also offers to help him come up with something for Amber's birthday, including how to express his emotions on her birthday card, but Andi is taken aback when Jonah thinks of her as a "pal" instead of something more. Buffy's competitive nature hits a new low when she discovers one of her track shoes is missing and assumes Marty stole it. She retaliates by taking Marty's shoes and inflicting water damage on them. As for the missing shoe, Cyrus reveals it was in his mother's car, coming out of Buffy's bag during one of her rides home with him. The episode concludes with Andi and Bex moving into a new apartment. Guest star: Garren Stitt as Marty
| 10 | 10 | "Home Away from Home" | Eyal Gordin | Phil Baker | June 9, 2017 | 110 | 1.29 |
Andi and Bex struggle with adjusting to their new home, and problems with the electricity and appliances are making matters worse. Andi has been removed from the home she has known for 13 years, and it is taking a toll, from issues about her laundry and the warm meals to her ability to work on her art. With her crafting supplies in the Andi Shack, she and Bex head back to the Mack house to retrieve them. Celia and Ham notice the two and are willing to welcome them back into their home, but Bex stands by her decision to move out, though she does apologize to Celia for taking Andi without giving her any notice. Ultimately, as Andi's mother, Bex begins to realize what is best for Andi and allows her to go back to Celia and Ham. After Celia returns Andi to be in her new home with Bex, Andi starts to embrace Bex as her mother. Meanwhile, Cyrus wonders where he stands with Iris, thinking their relationship is over. Intending to spend the day at a sporting event with her, Jonah and Amber, he winds up going with just Jonah after Buffy declines to be his date and the other girls think he has moved on. Guest star: Stoney Westmoreland as Ham
| 11 | 11 | "Were We Ever?" | Paul Hoen | Sam Wolfson | June 16, 2017 | 111 | 1.38 |
A new principal, Dr. Metcalf, takes over at Andi's school. He meets Andi, Cyrus and Buffy, and tells Andi her leggings violate the school's dress code. Unaware at first about this dress code, the three eventually object to it when they see all the clothing prohibited. With Bex's help, they stage a protest at the school, with the participating students wearing prison outfits. As this is also happening on picture day, Cyrus gets concerned over how he will look, but Buffy convinces him to go with what they are wearing. Jonah reminds Andi about the team picture for the Space Otters, but when she shows up, he does not see her in the team's uniform and tells her to change into it. With Jonah so focused on the picture, Andi quickly realizes his indifference to her standing up to the dress code—a fight she wins after negotiating with Dr. Metcalf about making the policy more reasonable. Andi and her friends later find out the school will redo picture day in light of the protest. Andi and Jonah have a more serious talk about what has happened, leading her to quit the Space Otters. She stands up to Jonah, wanting him to stop asking her to do things for him. When Jonah asks if they are still friends, Andi responds, "Were we ever?" Guest star: Oliver Vaquer as Dr. Metcalf Absent: Lauren Tom as Celia Mack
| 12 | 12 | "Best Surprise Ever" | Vanessa Parise | Elena Song & Suzanne Weber | June 23, 2017 | 112 | 1.94 |
Jonah is feeling down following Andi's quitting the Space Otters and all but ignoring him after their talk. Even Amber cannot cheer him up, with her friend Kip belittling the sport he loves. Cyrus encourages Jonah to talk to Andi, but when it appears Jonah will have a chance to do so in the school hallway, he notices Andi's excitement about Bowie's return instead. Jonah becomes so depressed that he cancels the Space Otters practice. This also leads to his unequivocal break-up with Amber. Meanwhile, Buffy gives Marty a new pair of shoes, her way of apologizing for what she did to his old ones, though Marty has wanted her to actually say she is sorry. They set a time to race each other to resolve who is faster, but when they worry about how they will react to the result, they call the race off. Andi discovers the reason Bowie came back is tied to Bex, whom he noticed in pictures across several stops on his tour with The Renaissance Boys. Andi arranges for her parents to have a romantic evening, and she also hears a song Bowie wrote for Bex. The next morning, Andi asks Bex how the evening went and hopes the two will get back together, but Bex tells Andi it is unlikely because Bowie's unpredictability makes him inclined not to stay in one place. When Andi talks to Bowie, she realizes his feelings for Bex have changed little over the years, but Bowie agrees with what Bex told Andi. Still, there is hope when Andi sees Bowie unexpectedly take a ring out of one of the blazers he is trying on at a vintage store. Guest stars: Emily Skinner as Amber, Trent Garrett as Bowie, Garren Stitt as Marty, CJ Strong as Kip Absent: Lauren Tom as Celia Mack

=== Season 2 (2017–18) ===
| No. overall | No. in season | Title | Directed by | Written by | Original release date | Prod. code | U.S. viewers (millions) |
|---|---|---|---|---|---|---|---|
| 13 | 1 | "Hey, Who Wants Pizza?" | Eyal Gordin | Terri Minsky | October 27, 2017 | 113–201 | 1.62 |
Andi talks to Bowie about proposing to Bex, while Cyrus introduces Iris as his girlfriend to Andi and Buffy, and Jonah invites Andi, Cyrus and Buffy to a pizza party for the Space Otters. At first, Andi does not want to go to the party, but later changes her mind after talking with Bex. Following the party, Jonah reveals to Andi that he broke up with Amber for good, though Andi had some idea prior to the party when he returned the bracelet she made for him. Andi gives Jonah back the bracelet and gets serious about being with him. While Cyrus is somewhat happy about seeing Andi and Jonah together again, he reveals to Buffy that he is also unhappy because he has romantic feelings for Jonah. Bowie comes over to Andi and Bex's apartment with a pizza and, with Andi's help, finally asks Bex to marry him. Bex's response is simply "um...", but Andi is hopeful she will eventually say yes. Later, while at work, Bex receives another pizza from Bowie, who is also hopeful she will accept his proposal. As Andi and her friends discover Amber as a waitress at The Spoon, Andi tells Buffy about how that is making her uncomfortable but also how nervous she is around Jonah. Buffy thinks Andi is not ready for a serious relationship yet. While the two are talking, Jonah is with Amber outside, which further upsets Andi. Although Jonah says nothing is going on, Buffy warns him not to hurt Andi, causing him to leave the diner. Andi later talks to Jonah and wants their relationship to grow without Amber standing in the way. After having some time to think about Bowie's proposal, Bex reveals to Andi that she is not going to marry him. Guest stars: Stoney Westmoreland as Ham, Trent Garrett as Bowie, Emily Skinner as Amber, Chelsea T. Zhang as Brittany, Molly Jackson as Iris Note: This is a double-length special episode.
| 14 | 2 | "Chinese New Year" | Eyal Gordin | Elena Song | November 3, 2017 | 202 | 1.66 |
Andi is disappointed about Bex saying no to Bowie's marriage proposal and wants Bex to tell Bowie as soon as possible, as he is unaware. With the approach of the Chinese New Year, and Andi and Bex's aunt Mei and cousin Ronald coming over to Celia's house, the news will have to wait. Andi invites Jonah to the new year event, but his not understanding the customs puts Celia on edge, as well as the idea of Andi even having a boyfriend. Meanwhile, Celia wants to show Mei that she can successfully host a Chinese New Year feast and is quite appreciative of Bowie's contributions for the occasion. After Bowie announces that he may have some good news to share, Celia uses the opportunity to make the event special, until Andi hints to Bowie what she already knows and announces to the rest that Bex and Bowie are not getting married. Bowie is saddened by this and leaves. With track season over, Buffy decides to try out for basketball, but with no girls' team at Jefferson Middle School, she signs up for the boys' team. After some practice with Marty, Buffy lets him know how confident she is of making the team, despite her actually being nervous. She feels she needs to outperform the boys to secure a spot. Andi continues to be upset that Bex let Bowie go, but when finding something to eat, she rediscovers that picture which Bex tore up, making her even more upset. She wants to know whether the person in that picture is the reason behind Bex's decision not to marry Bowie. Guest stars: Freda Foh Shen as Mei, Stoney Westmoreland as Ham, Trent Garrett as Bowie, Garren Stitt as Marty, Alan Ko as Ronald
| 15 | 3 | "Friends Like These" | Adam Weissman | Phil Baker | November 10, 2017 | 203 | 1.40 |
Andi grows suspicious when Amber starts having a normal conversation with her. Jonah tells Andi that Amber just wants to be friends, but Andi thinks Amber has not gotten over Jonah. Andi, Cyrus and Buffy try another hangout place to avoid Amber at The Spoon. Meanwhile, Buffy and Marty go through tryouts to make the basketball team, but Buffy gets annoyed by TJ, the team's captain. Despite feeling she will not make the team because of him, Buffy shares the good news with Andi and Cyrus when she does. Marty fails to make the team but is happy for Buffy. Cyrus and Iris spend an evening together at her house and watch a movie, but he becomes uncomfortable following a kiss with her and decides to leave. Andi finds out more about the man in the picture Bex tore up, an ex-boyfriend named Gabriel. Bex has trouble letting him go and tells Andi he is the reason she is insecure about marrying anyone, including Bowie. Andi helps Bex find closure with Gabriel by placing his picture with those of her other ex-boyfriends in her box of memories, which leads to them taking out Bowie's picture. Guest stars: Emily Skinner as Amber, Garren Stitt as Marty, Molly Jackson as Iris, Luke Mullen as TJ Absent: Lauren Tom as Celia Mack
| 16 | 4 | "Mama" | Eyal Gordin | Terri Minsky | November 17, 2017 | 204 | 1.58 |
Celia informs Andi and Bex about a closet clean-out at the Mack house, which is on the anniversary of a day Bex wishes never happened—the day she left 13 years earlier. Bex and Celia tell Andi completely different versions of the story behind that day. Bex eventually reveals that her leaving was tied to Andi's first word as a baby, "mama", directed at Celia. Upon hearing that, Andi feels regret that she caused Bex to leave. Bex tells Andi that her decision was for the best as she wanted her to be happy, and Celia is thankful for the sacrifice Bex made. Meanwhile, Jonah teaches Cyrus how to skateboard, but Cyrus' inability to control the skateboard leads to his going to the hospital. Buffy becomes a friend to her neighbor Millie through a community service project she is doing for school. Later, Celia reveals to Bex that the clean-out was about more than their opportunity to reconcile about that day 13 years ago. She plans to sell the house and leaves it to Bex to tell Andi, news which will devastate her particularly because of Andi Shack. Bex delays mentioning it to Andi. Guest stars: Stoney Westmoreland as Ham, Juliet Mills as Millie
| 17 | 5 | "The Snorpion" | Eyal Gordin | Erin Dunlap | November 24, 2017 | 205 | 1.18 |
After overhearing part of a phone conversation Amber is having with her father, Andi decides to spend time with her by inviting her to a sleepover. Having warned Andi before about Amber by comparing her to a snake in one story, Buffy relays another story to Andi about a frog and a scorpion, and compares Amber to the scorpion—leading to the term "snorpion". At the sleepover, Amber tells Andi that her father lost his job, which is why she is working at The Spoon. With Andi enjoying Amber's company, the two decide to sneak out to an amusement park, where Amber convinces Andi to ride the Ferris wheel. When Amber sees a call from Jonah on Andi's phone, she becomes furious and leaves Andi stranded. This lands Andi in police custody, and Bex and Bowie are left to discipline her after they get home, though Andi ends up deciding her punishment when they cannot come up with one. Meanwhile, Buffy is upset over her teammates not giving her the ball during a basketball game. When she confronts TJ about what she needs to do to change this, she realizes he simply does not want her on the team at all. Also, Bex is working toward her cosmetology certification. Her makeup skills also help Andi fool Amber by thinking that Andi injured herself trying to get down the Ferris wheel. Guest stars: Emily Skinner as Amber, Trent Garrett as Bowie, Luke Mullen as TJ Absent: Lauren Tom as Celia Mack
| 18 | 6 | "I Wanna Hold Your Wristband" | Joe Menendez | Sam Wolfson | December 1, 2017 | 206 | 1.45 |
Andi is nervous about holding hands with Jonah at school, but just as she is about to, the principal, Dr. Metcalf, splits the students into two separate groups, with Andi and Cyrus in group A, and Buffy and Jonah in group B. When Andi figures out that her group has luxuries while Jonah's group struggles over what they are dealt, she decides to switch groups and encourages the rest in her group to do the same, despite Dr. Metcalf's order for the two groups to stay separate. After chaos ensues in the cafeteria over cookies, Dr. Metcalf ends his exercise, getting across to the students that what group they belong in does not give them any advantage or disadvantage. He also asks them how he decided what group they went to, and while Andi contends it was random, she realizes his selections were alphabetically based. The school day ends with Andi and Jonah both holding hands, though Jonah admits having sweaty palms like Andi. When Andi returns home, Bex finally tells her that Celia and Ham are selling the house. The news devastates Andi, prompting her to return to Andi Shack. Guest stars: Trent Garrett as Bowie, Oliver Vaquer as Dr. Metcalf, Anson Bagley as Gus
| 19 | 7 | "Head Over Heels" | Joe Menendez | Erin Dunlap | January 15, 2018 | 207 | 1.31 |
To help Andi take her mind off of Celia and Ham's plans to sell the Mack house, Jonah asks her on a date by inviting her to a virtual reality arcade. Buffy is also invited, but she brings Marty with her so she does not feel like a third wheel, making the occasion a double date, even though the two are not really dating. During his virtual reality adventure, Jonah slips and gets hurt. When Jonah refuses Andi's aid, she worries that he is upset with her after she briefly laughed at his mishap. Andi continues to worry and feels Jonah is avoiding her when she later gets no response to her texts. Despite Jonah denying that he is upset with her after she asked him twice, Andi turns to Bex, who tells her to ask a third time. Andi becomes frustrated waiting for Jonah at school, but when she finally has the chance, she trips and falls as she approaches him to ask the question again. Jonah briefly laughs but assures Andi that he is not upset with her. Meanwhile, Buffy feels comfortable being just friends with Marty but finds out he wants more in their relationship. Also, Cyrus asks Bex for her opinion about a screenplay he has written, but Bex's hesitation to tell him the truth about the script has him setting his sights on making the movie. Guest stars: Garren Stitt as Marty, Chelsea T. Zhang as Brittany Absent: Lauren Tom as Celia Mack
| 20 | 8 | "There's a Mack in the Shack" | Paul Hoen | Elena Song | January 19, 2018 | 208 | 1.28 |
Andi decorates her shack with numerous paper cranes, hoping Celia and Ham will notice and change their mind about selling the house. While talking with Celia, Andi springs a deal of coming over to the house more often, news which delights Celia to the point of allowing Andi to choose her breakfast or dance to loud music. Celia even invites Andi to a tape tunnel exhibit which has her missing school and worrying Bex. When Ham finds out the true reason Andi has been spending more time at the house, he wonders why Celia did not fill him in, but when Bex comes up with a better idea to save Andi Shack, and Celia and Ham explain their plans of seeing the world, Andi begins to accept that selling the house may not be a bad idea. It turns out Celia and Ham need more time to decide where they will live, so they postpone selling the house. Meanwhile, Buffy is asked by her math teacher to tutor a failing student. She bails when she discovers it is TJ, but as he is in jeopardy of being kicked off the basketball team, she will help him if, in return, he starts passing the ball to her during games. Also, Cyrus struggles with getting his chocolate chip muffin at school, but as another concession to Buffy, TJ gives Cyrus tips on claiming it. After Andi, Bex and Celia have fun at a dance class Celia is taking, the three stop at The Spoon. Just as they are about to order some food, Andi sees Jonah enter the diner with a girl named Natalie. Guest stars: Stoney Westmoreland as Ham, Luke Mullen as TJ, Shelby Simmons as Natalie
| 21 | 9 | "You're the One That I Want" | Paul Hoen | Phil Baker | January 26, 2018 | 209 | 1.28 |
Andi finds out from Jonah that Natalie heads the ultimate frisbee team for another school in town, but is wary after Jonah says that Natalie is "just a friend". Amber warns Andi that while she was dating Jonah, he used the same words to refer to Andi. Buffy and Cyrus spy on both Jonah and Natalie at a gathering with "Furious George", one of the top ultimate discheads in the world, but cannot find anything that would make the two more than just friends. Meanwhile, Andi and Jonah have plans to go on a school trip to a Grease singalong, which Buffy and Cyrus are also attending, but Andi learns Jonah has been asked to take part in a video with Natalie and "Furious George", though Jonah says he can get out of it. Unsure whether he does, Andi races over to where the video is being shot, only to hear from Natalie that Jonah is going to the singalong, so she races back to catch the bus, which she almost misses. Bex meets a woman named Miranda, who works at the same plant nursery Bowie does. When Miranda decides she wants to ask Bowie out and wonders how much Bex knows about him, Bex appears supportive, yet uncomfortable. Guest stars: Emily Skinner as Amber, Trent Garrett as Bowie, Shelby Simmons as Natalie, Chloe Hurst as Miranda Absent: Lauren Tom as Celia Mack
| 22 | 10 | "A Good Hair Day" | Paul Hoen and Adam Weissman | Suzanne Weber | February 2, 2018 | 210 | 1.21 |
While Andi and Bowie are having breakfast at The Spoon, Andi discovers from Bowie's driver's license that it is his birthday. Bowie does not want to make a big deal out of it, but Andi wants to throw him a huge surprise party at Celia and Ham's place. She has Bex work out the details, while she attends a Renaissance Festival for most of the day with her friends. Bex sees Bowie at work and tries to get him to Celia and Ham's for a "plant emergency", but Bowie realizes she is trying to get him to the surprise party. Bex finds out the reason Bowie is not in a celebrating mood, as his father's birthday was on the same day but he died three years ago. Despite this, Bex encourages Bowie to come to the party for Andi's sake. He does and has a wonderful time, but he is greatly touched after Andi calls him "dad" for the first time. Meanwhile, Buffy shows Jonah her competitive side in arm wrestling, where he also matches quite well, and later at the Renaissance Festival, they square off in a medieval-style tug o' war, which ends in a draw. Cyrus tries to tell Iris that he does not have any romantic feelings for her, with Iris figuring out he does not like her like a girlfriend; the two agree to just be friends. Guest stars: Stoney Westmoreland as Ham, Trent Garrett as Bowie, Molly Jackson as Iris
| 23 | 11 | "Miniature Gulf" | Paul Hoen | Suzanne Weber | February 9, 2018 | 211 | 1.14 |
While Andi, Bex and Bowie are playing miniature golf, Bowie receives a phone call and Andi wonders who he is talking to. Sensing the body language from both of her parents, Andi is sure Bowie is seeing someone and tries to get information about it. Eventually, she finds out Bowie is dating Miranda and wants to meet her, but Bowie says it is too soon. Andi later has second thoughts about seeing Miranda because it may be too much for her to have possibly another parent-figure. When Andi and Bex go miniature golfing again, by themselves, Andi spots Bowie with Miranda and a little girl, whom she deduces is Miranda's daughter. Meanwhile, Cyrus is tapped by Dr. Metcalf to make an orientation video for new students of Jefferson Middle School and has Jonah film him, but Cyrus gets nervous in front of the camera. Also, Buffy's tutoring TJ gets nowhere as she realizes he is having difficulty even with basic math. Guest stars: Trent Garrett as Bowie, Luke Mullen as TJ, Chloe Hurst as Miranda, Eden Grace Redfield as Morgan Absent: Lauren Tom as Celia Mack
| 24 | 12 | "We Were Never" | Michelle Manning | Sam Wolfson | February 16, 2018 | 212 | 1.37 |
Andi notices Jonah is not wearing the bracelet she gave him because it is falling apart. She offers to fix it, but Jonah tells her "no rush". After Celia and Ham sense something is wrong with Andi, Celia has Andi consult the I Ching and discovers her hexagram is one of a serious nature; Andi is left to interpret what that means. Bex receives her cosmetology certificate and delivers the speech at her graduation. Celia and Ham attend the ceremony, and while Bex is shocked they are there after telling Andi not to invite them, she is pleased when they say they are proud of her. Cyrus prepares for his bar mitzvah and has Jonah look over his wardrobe of suits. TJ is desperate to get his math homework done ahead of a basketball game, by attempting to cheat when he asks Buffy to do it for him. At the basketball game, TJ continues his stubbornness of not passing the ball to Buffy, but when he finally does, Buffy gets a huge surprise from her mother, who is briefly home from a tour of duty and appears at the game. After Andi fixes the bracelet, Jonah tells her that it represents the two being "boyfriend" and "girlfriend", and he does not want to wear it because he is not into labels. This devastates Andi, and after she reflects on what Jonah has done for her, she feels they were never together in the first place. Guest stars: Stoney Westmoreland as Ham, Luke Mullen as TJ, Siena Goines as Pat Driscoll
| 25 | 13 | "Cyrus' Bash-Mitzvah!" | Paul Hoen | Terri Minsky | February 23, 2018 | 213–214 | 1.39 |
Andi continues to be troubled by Jonah when he avoids her during Cyrus' bar mitzvah and party. Cyrus tells Andi that Jonah has not actually broken up with her, but she feels otherwise. Cyrus then tells Andi that he too has romantic feelings for Jonah, which previously only Buffy had known. Later at the party, Andi, Cyrus and Buffy see a fortune teller and discover one thing about each of their futures. Buffy is the most disturbed about what she finds out and hopes it will not come true, about her mother being deployed again. After Buffy confirms her mother is home for a while, she returns to the fortune teller, who reminds her about the whole vision, which suggests she is moving. Andi wonders about having a real boyfriend, and the fortune teller indicates she will, soon. Cyrus and Buffy think it is Jonah, but Andi is not ready to talk to him. She starts spending time with Walker, a caricature artist at the party who gives her a beautiful picture he has drawn of her. Jonah becomes jealous, not knowing who this guy is, and when he asks Cyrus and Buffy about him, they have no clue either. Andi and Jonah finally talk about what is going on, but after Andi says her feelings for him have changed, Jonah suffers a panic attack. After the party, Jonah comes over to Andi's place and despite his opposition to labels, he asks her if she will be his girlfriend, to which she replies, "um...". Meanwhile, Bowie works on discussing Miranda with both Andi and Bex. Despite his new relationship, he tells Andi, in writing he jotted down on a napkin during the party, that he could live without the "universe", but not her. Guest stars: Stoney Westmoreland as Ham, Trent Garrett as Bowie, Luke Mullen as TJ, Darius Marcell as Walker, Peggy Ann Blow as Madame Le Doux, Danny Jacobs as Norman Note: This is a double-length special episode.
| 26 | 14 | "Better to Have Wuvved and Wost" | Kenny Ortega | Jason Dorris | June 4, 2018 | 215 | 1.14 |
Buffy discovers the fortune teller's prediction has come true, with her mother, Pat, being assigned to work in Phoenix. Andi comes up with an idea that will allow Buffy to stay, by having her live with Celia and Ham. While Andi waits to inform Celia about this arrangement, Pat appears to be all right with Buffy being with her friends, except she does not want to miss her any more after all the time they have been apart. Buffy shares that feeling, making Andi and Cyrus realize that moving is for the best. The three plan to make the most of the remaining time they have together, before Buffy moves in 10 days. Meanwhile, Jonah tries to find the right gift for Andi, who does appreciate his thinking of her but is unimpressed by the gifts he comes up with. Bex attempts to reach out to Amber, who has been feeling like an outsider lately, with no friends; things go wrong when Bex gives Amber a makeover. Guest stars: Emily Skinner as Amber, Siena Goines as Pat Driscoll
| 27 | 15 | "Perfect Day 2.0" | Paul Hoen | Erin Dunlap | June 11, 2018 | 216 | 0.95 |
With a week to go until Buffy moves, Andi seeks to recreate the "perfect" day that she, Buffy and Cyrus experienced years ago, which included their first alpine slide. They travel by bicycle to a cider and donut shop they all remember fondly and stop for a treat. Just as they are ready to head for the alpine slide, Buffy and Cyrus discover their bikes are missing. The three later try to get to the slide by police escort, which gets cut short. With Andi and Buffy leaving their stuff in the police car, the three end up completely stranded, and Cyrus' phone, with an almost drained battery, is their only hope. They use it to call Bex, and although Andi indicates nothing wrong on their trip, Bex manages to find them and give them a ride back home. Meanwhile, Bowie finds out about Jonah's panic attacks, but also realizes Jonah has a musical gift after giving him a guitar lesson. Guest star: Trent Garrett as Bowie Absent: Lauren Tom as Celia Mack
| 28 | 16 | "Truth or Truth" | Joe Menendez | Suzanne Weber | June 18, 2018 | 217 | 0.98 |
A power outage at school means a day off for Andi and her friends. Bex sets up a "fort" for Andi in their living room where the two can spend time together by themselves. The two try a BFF quiz from a magazine, and one of the questions frustrates Andi, who wants to know Bex's biggest regret but gets no answer from her. Eventually, Bex reveals to Andi that she regrets not saying yes to Bowie's marriage proposal. Andi wants Bex to relay that to Bowie, but Bex refuses to do so, pointing out that he has moved on. This leads to their first fight, with Andi becoming so hurt that she leaves home and asks Bowie if she can stay with him. Meanwhile, Cyrus coaxes Buffy into playing a board game on their day off. Jonah joins in, and while the three get immersed into the game, Jonah is also becoming increasingly worried about Andi, who is not returning any of his texts. Cyrus and Buffy, who find out Jonah and Andi are truly together, try to assure him that Andi is dealing with something else for the day, because she has not texted them either. Guest star: Trent Garrett as Bowie
| 29 | 17 | "A Walker to Remember" | Joe Menendez | Elena Song | June 25, 2018 | 218 | 0.92 |
When TJ becomes ineligible to play basketball due to his math grades, Cyrus gives him advice about his learning disability to allow him to play. This does not sit well with Buffy, who is starting to make a name for herself on the basketball team. When she discovers TJ told his math teacher about his disability, she becomes more suspicious about Cyrus' motives. TJ's actions end up costing Buffy her spot on the basketball team and her friendship with Cyrus. Meanwhile, Andi gets a surprise phone call from someone not on her contacts list and finds out it is Walker. As the two spend time together at an art gallery, Walker asks for Andi's help with artwork he is trying to create, and they develop a masterpiece. Bowie gets Jonah an appointment with a professional music teacher, but Jonah misses that appointment when he is sidetracked by the artwork both Andi and Walker did. Guest stars: Trent Garrett as Bowie, Luke Mullen as TJ, Darius Marcell as Walker Absent: Lauren Tom as Celia Mack
| 30 | 18 | "Crime Scene: Andi Shack!" | Charles Minsky | Phil Baker | July 2, 2018 | 219 | 1.14 |
When Andi and Bowie are about to head to Celia's house, they see Miranda and her daughter Morgan. Since Miranda needs to do some errands, Andi and Bowie are willing to look after Morgan, and Andi gives her a look at Andi Shack. The girls do some crafting in there until Miranda comes to pick up Morgan, but after they leave, Andi discovers a special bracelet she is making for Bex is missing. She accuses Morgan of taking it after searching thoroughly and tells Bowie, who has a hard time believing her. It turns out Morgan did not take the bracelet, as Bowie finds it later, misplaced in Andi Shack. Though Andi apologizes to Morgan, she is convinced that Miranda is not right for Bowie. Jonah holds a fundraiser breakfast for the Space Otters but struggles with the event because Gus forgot to send the invitations. Cyrus and Buffy eventually show up to help, but their continued fighting about their friendship threatens the fundraiser. As the two learn about Jonah's recent panic attacks, they talk through what has happened, including when TJ first talked to Cyrus and wanted to be his friend, and they end their fighting. Guest stars: Trent Garrett as Bowie, Chloe Hurst as Miranda, Eden Grace Redfield as Morgan, Anson Bagley as Gus
| 31 | 19 | "Andi's Choice" | Paul Hoen | Sam Wolfson | July 9, 2018 | 220 | 1.07 |
Jonah tells Bowie that Andi may not like him anymore, so Bowie encourages him to sing at an open mic night at the Red Rooster and helps him to write the song. Andi, meanwhile, gets another call from Walker, who wants to see her again, but Andi tells him she needs to be with Buffy as her moving day draws near. Walker surprises Andi at The Spoon and also meets Cyrus and Buffy, drawing a picture of the three as Buffy's going-away gift. While Andi enjoys spending time with Walker, she also thinks about Jonah, who later invites her, as well as Cyrus and Buffy, to the open mic night. When it comes time for Jonah to perform, he nervously struggles through his song until he looks at Andi. She reacts favorably to the song by kissing him. Meanwhile, The Fringe suddenly picks up multiple positive reviews, all of which Bex discovers her mother is behind, as well as negative ones against the competition. When that backfires, Celia finds another way to get her daughter noticed, by buying The Fringe, which has been struggling financially. Guest stars: Trent Garrett as Bowie, Chelsea T. Zhang as Brittany, Darius Marcell as Walker
| 32 | 20 | "For the Last Time" | Michelle Manning | Jonathan S. Hurwitz | July 16, 2018 | 221 | 0.83 |
On the last day before Buffy and her mother move to Phoenix, Andi and Cyrus are faced with saying goodbye. After Buffy makes a casual comment about bottling her memories with her friends in a time capsule, Andi and Cyrus decide they want to do that as a way to remember her. Despite her comment, Buffy is against the idea and feels disinclined to say goodbye to her friends. Andi and Cyrus work on building the capsule anyway, hoping Buffy will see it before she leaves the next morning. Jonah also contributes to it, adding a basketball signed by Buffy's teammates, as well as her team jersey. When Andi, Cyrus and Jonah go to Buffy's house that night to surprise her with the time capsule, they discover the Driscolls have already left, without a goodbye. Meanwhile, Ham is upset after finding out from Bex that Celia bought The Fringe, which leads Celia to opt out of the purchase. Guest stars: Stoney Westmoreland as Ham, Siena Goines as Pat Driscoll
| 33 | 21 | "Buffy in a Bottle" | Paul Hoen | Erin Dunlap | July 23, 2018 | 222 | 0.88 |
Andi and Cyrus miss Buffy and try to cope by talking to her time capsule, since they are not hearing from her. Later, Andi invites Walker to her apartment, intending to tell him that she is seeing Jonah. Complicating matters is a pair of shoes Walker gives to her, which he designed from their earlier painting. Although Andi is not inclined to accept the shoes, she reluctantly does after Walker insists she keep them. When Jonah sees Andi wearing the shoes, he becomes upset, aware they came from Walker without her mentioning him by name. Andi worries over Jonah avoiding her afterward, and her anxiety is not eased by his being with Natalie. She wants to talk to Bex about her problem, but with Bex and Celia working on a redesign project for The Fringe, which becomes known as Cloud Ten, Andi feels left out with no one else to talk to. Despite things looking bleak, Andi gets a big surprise when she notices Buffy right outside her apartment. Meanwhile, TJ helps Cyrus deal with his inability to do somersaults. Guest stars: Luke Mullen as TJ, Darius Marcell as Walker, Shelby Simmons as Natalie
| 34 | 22 | "Keep a Lid on It" | Joe Menendez | Joanne Lee | July 30, 2018 | 223 | 0.70 |
With Buffy's return, Andi and Cyrus find out she lives only one hour away from them, much closer than Phoenix, due to government budget cuts changing Pat's assignment. Buffy appreciates her time capsule and wants to peek inside, but the lid is on tight. Andi informs her about the contents, including her basketball jersey and a ball signed by her teammates, which Andi mentions was Jonah's idea. Jonah, meanwhile, tries out for the elite Ultimate team at school, with Cyrus there to support him, and to comfort him when he does not make the team. Cyrus later tells Buffy that he no longer has romantic feelings for Jonah, as his feelings have become those of friendship. That leads Buffy to reveal that she has romantic feelings for someone; when she wants to keep it from Andi, Cyrus immediately believes it is Jonah. Andi works on a new bracelet for Jonah, and while she does, Bex reminds her about the old one, which she thought was discarded but discovers in a memory box Bex started for her. Andi gives Jonah the original bracelet back; they enter into a romantic relationship. Ham informs Andi and Bex that he plans to travel overseas by himself, and while shocked by the news, the women understand he needs the adventure. He lets Celia know during a family dinner. Guest star: Stoney Westmoreland as Ham
| 35 | 23 | "Bought, Lost or Stolen" | Paul Hoen | Phil Baker & Sam Wolfson | August 6, 2018 | 224 | 0.94 |
When Bowie discovers that Morgan is about leave Red Rooster with an unpaid music box, he questions Miranda's handling of the situation. Miranda has Morgan return the item, but Bowie is disturbed over Miranda's not reprimanding her daughter for stealing. In remembering the incident over Andi's missing bracelet which she accused Morgan of taking from Andi Shack, Bowie was sure the bracelet had been misplaced but finds out Miranda planted it back in Andi Shack to cover her daughter's theft. That leads Bowie to break up with Miranda, as he can no longer trust her—and to apologize to Andi for not believing her. Meanwhile, Cyrus notices Amber with one of his therapist parents for counseling, and while he promises to honor the doctor-patient confidentiality, Amber tests him to ensure she can trust him not to reveal any of her secrets. Andi is uncomfortable over Walker's original drawing of her being on exhibit at an art festival, despite its first-place award, but seems relieved after Jonah and Walker's first meeting, at the festival, turns out to be amicable. When Cyrus sees Buffy talking to Walker at the festival, her body language prompts him to think she is attracted to Walker instead of Jonah. Guest stars: Trent Garrett as Bowie, Emily Skinner as Amber, Darius Marcell as Walker, Chloe Hurst as Miranda, Eden Grace Redfield as Morgan
| 36 | 24 | "We're on Cloud Ten" | David Kendall | Elena Song & Suzanne Weber | August 10, 2018 | 225 | 1.01 |
Andi, Bex and Celia are getting word out about the opening of Cloud Ten, formerly The Fringe. Jonah asks Andi on their first true date there, and they spend it at a place with a bunch of trampolines. Andi enjoys the date and asks Jonah on another one, but he declines because he is going to an eight-week camp to improve his Ultimate skills. The news comes as a shock to Andi, who finds out he is leaving the next day. After they say goodbye, she resigns to Andi Shack and finds Celia in there, who is dealing with Ham being away, so the two console each other. With Andi out on her date with Jonah, Bex and Bowie spend time together, rekindling their relationship. Later, while seeing Bex asleep, Bowie tells her he loves her, unaware that she hears him. Bex tells Andi the next day that she is going to propose to Bowie. Meanwhile, Cyrus is seeing animosity between Buffy and Amber, which he discovers after talking to them is superficial hatred, with neither actually holding a grudge against each other. Guest stars: Trent Garrett as Bowie, Emily Skinner as Amber
| 37 | 25 | "The Cake That Takes the Cake" | Paul Hoen | Terri Minsky | August 13, 2018 | 226 | 1.05 |
Bex decides to propose to Bowie, and Andi assists Bex in choosing a ring. They see one with the yin-yang symbol, which they believe perfectly represents Bowie. They decide to hide the ring inside a cake, which they will serve at a dinner party for Bowie, but they are surprised when Bowie brings along his old band mates from The Renaissance Boys with him. Just as Bex is ready to propose to Bowie, one of his band mates asks him to return to The Renaissance Boys for their six-month international tour. Andi and Bex both want him to join the tour, even if it means Bex will have to wait a while longer before she proposes. Meanwhile, Cyrus attempts to encourage Buffy to return to the Jefferson Middle School basketball team by having her face off against TJ in order to remind her how good a player she is. Buffy ends up winning the match against TJ and announces that she is founding the school's first-ever girls' basketball team. Additionally, TJ apologizes to Buffy for the way he treated her when she was on the team and the two ultimately come to a truce. Bowie uncovers the ring that Andi and Bex hid in the cake, but when he inquires about it, both Andi and Bex reply, "um...". Guest stars: Trent Garrett as Bowie, Luke Mullen as TJ, Adam Chambers as Rafe Absent: Asher Angel as Jonah Beck

=== Season 3 (2018–19) ===
| No. overall | No. in season | Title | Directed by | Written by | Original release date | Prod. code | U.S. viewers (millions) |
|---|---|---|---|---|---|---|---|
| 38 | 1 | "The Boys Are Back" | Michelle Manning | Terri Minsky | October 8, 2018 | 301 | 0.90 |
While Andi anxiously awaits Jonah's return from Ultimate camp, she learns about Buffy becoming involved with Walker. She appears fine with the two being together but is really torn over seeing her friend with someone she went out with. Ham returns from his travels, and Andi, Bex and Celia are glad to see him back home. Bowie unexpectedly returns from his international tour with The Renaissance Boys, revealing to Andi and Bex that he actually did not want to go in the first place. He recalls the night Andi and Bex surprised him with the ring, two months earlier, with Bex deciding to put off the marriage proposal until after his tour. Now that Bowie is back home, he and Bex both pop the question to each other and accept each other's proposal. As Andi and her parents celebrate, Jonah returns from camp, but he becomes shocked to hear Andi downgrade their relationship to being just friends. Meanwhile, Cyrus' English accent, acquired from his recent trip to London, annoys Andi and Buffy. Guest stars: Stoney Westmoreland as Ham, Darius Marcell as Walker
| 39 | 2 | "Howling at the Moon Festival" | Paul Hoen | Elena Song | October 15, 2018 | 302 | 0.67 |
Celia invites her sister Mei to the Mack house for the moon festival, intending to announce Bex and Bowie's engagement. After hearing about the soon-to-be newlyweds, Mei shares news that her daughter Ling is expecting twins, irritating Celia in the process. Mei and Ling also ascertain Bex and Bowie's wedding plans, not pleased about it being a simple ceremony at city hall. Meanwhile, Andi invites Jonah to the moon festival, despite wanting to be just friends with him, and Cyrus and Buffy also come. Jonah's experience turns into disaster after sniffing a candle causes him to sneeze, leading to some wax on a nearby wall which ends up spreading in his attempt to remove it. Feeling stressed over what happened, Jonah feels he is not worthy to be Andi's boyfriend, but the two talk more about their changing relationship. Each has thoughts about breaking up, but settle on being friends, instead of a couple. Mei and Ling decide to leave before the release of the floating lanterns, each one containing a written wish. As the lanterns go into the air, one wish falls to the ground, which Andi picks up. Guest stars: Stoney Westmoreland as Ham, Freda Foh Shen as Mei, Nicole Bilderback as Ling
| 40 | 3 | "It's a Dilemna" | Paul Hoen | Erin Dunlap | October 22, 2018 | 303 | 0.69 |
Andi is excited about the color factory coming to town, and Buffy thinks Walker will enjoy the event. After Andi tells her how uncomfortable she feels seeing the two together, Buffy has no problem with not inviting him for her sake. Andi later gets a visit from Walker, who tells her that Buffy did not want him to come to the color factory, so she tells him he can go. Buffy is shocked to see Walker show up, but he assures her that Andi is okay with his being there. In the end, Andi stays home while Cyrus, Buffy, Jonah and Walker all have a great time, causing her to feel left out. Meanwhile, Celia is insistent on a traditional wedding for Bex and decides to set a date without her consent. Bowie attempts to teach a musical hopeful named Shaun, discovering he is no prodigy like Jonah. Also, Cyrus takes dance class to improve his failing grade in physical education. Guest stars: Darius Marcell as Walker, Nick Yiakoumatos as Shaun, Tyler Poelle as Victor
| 41 | 4 | "Hole in the Wall" | Michelle Manning | Sam Wolfson | November 2, 2018 | 304 | 0.67 |
Bex and Bowie surprise Andi by telling her they are moving into a new place, but Andi is more surprised that this place is an adjacent apartment, which Bowie makes an extension of Andi and Bex's. In adjusting to the renovation, Andi and Bex are needing to set ground rules for Bowie after he takes their body care products. Meanwhile, as the only performer at the Red Rooster's open mic night, Jonah writes and sings a new song, which ends up offending Andi. Jonah apologizes to her by performing the same song again, at school, with reworked lyrics. Even though the two like the idea of not being a couple, Andi later offends Jonah by suggesting that either of them could like someone else. Buffy starts the girls' basketball team but struggles as its captain. She asks for TJ's help in molding the team. Guest star: Luke Mullen as TJ Absent: Lauren Tom as Celia Mack
| 42 | 5 | "That Syncing Feeling" | Paul Hoen | Suzanne Weber | November 9, 2018 | 305 | 0.84 |
Andi, Cyrus, Buffy and Jonah go on a canoe trip, and Buffy brings Walker along. Those two pair up in one canoe, while Cyrus and Jonah are in another, leaving Andi the odd one out. Amber sees Andi by herself, and while the two talk in a canoe of their own, Amber points out that Buffy violated the "girl code" by going out with Walker, after Andi had previously gone out with him. Andi and Amber start spending more time together after their canoeing experience, with Cyrus and Buffy barely noticing. Meanwhile, Bowie is faced with giving Shaun another guitar lesson, questioning whether he can teach anybody other than Jonah. Bowie discovers Shaun is only taking lessons to please his father, but notices that Shaun's father, Victor, is passionate about the guitar and gives him a lesson. Andi and Celia do some tasting of wedding cakes for Bex, but they cannot agree on a single cake, forcing Bex to pick between the two they chose. Guest stars: Emily Skinner as Amber, Darius Marcell as Walker, Nick Yiakoumatos as Shaun, Tyler Poelle as Victor
| 43 | 6 | "Cookie Monster" | Paul Hoen | Phil Baker | November 16, 2018 | 306 | 0.89 |
Bowie's mother, Cookie, visits her son and sees her granddaughter Andi for the first time. Andi feels uncomfortable at first, when she sees the apartment rearranged and her parents pampered by Cookie. She eventually understands that Cookie, while going overboard with her gestures, wants to spend the precious time she has with Bowie, as well as her granddaughter, since she is overseas most of the time. Meanwhile, Buffy and Jonah learn that their principal, Dr. Metcalf, has tattoos, causing them to think differently about him. Cyrus joins TJ and his two friends Reed and Lester on a dirt biking adventure, but during that time, Cyrus discovers that Reed has a gun, which belongs to his father. Though Reed only intends to use it for recreation, Cyrus worries about his and TJ's safety and later goes to Dr. Metcalf. A police officer questions Cyrus about the gun. Guest stars: Colleen Camp as Cookie, Luke Mullen as TJ, Oliver Vaquer as Dr. Metcalf, Parker Queenan as Reed
| 44 | 7 | "The New Girls" | Michelle Manning | Elena Song & Suzanne Weber | November 30, 2018 | 307 | 0.83 |
Buffy continues to have difficulty improving the girls' basketball team but sees a new girl at school who may help named Kira. After recruiting her and seeing her impressive play, Buffy sees Kira's attitude about teamwork as a problem and cuts her from the team. Meanwhile, Andi notices a girl with Jonah, but her attempt to talk to her goes unanswered. After Andi discovers from Jonah that the girl, Libby, is deaf, the two girls become friends. When they talk about Jonah, though, Andi tells Libby not to let her stand in the way of dating him. Andi and Buffy keep Cyrus from communicating with TJ, but the two boys eventually talk, with Cyrus finding out that TJ was the one who told the police about the gun. Bex allows Bowie to make some minor repairs at Cloud Ten, while Celia is concerned about Ham's latest project. Guest stars: Millicent Simmonds as Libby, Stoney Westmoreland as Ham, Luke Mullen as TJ, Raquel Justice as Kira
| 45 | 8 | "I Got Your Number" | Joe Menendez | Sam Wolfson | January 18, 2019 | 308 | 0.77 |
Buffy invites Andi to a dance movie night at her place, but on a night Andi has other plans, so they try to reschedule. Andi is looking forward to attending a party with Amber, but when Amber takes her to a warehouse, where a "high school" party is taking place, Andi realizes it is too mature for her. She texts Bowie to get her, while he and Bex are enjoying a surprise night out on their own. In disciplining Andi about her wrong decision, Bowie discovers he is truly becoming a parent. Meanwhile, Cyrus discovers Jonah and TJ have a past when he sees Jonah upset. A few years earlier, the two were teammates in little league baseball, but Jonah has not forgotten that TJ took his uniform. When Cyrus shows them a picture of the team, the number "21" appears on TJ's jersey, the number Jonah wanted and was assigned, but TJ sees it as "12". Jonah becomes aware of TJ's dyscalculia. Guest stars: Emily Skinner as Amber, Luke Mullen as TJ, Faustino Duran as Young Jonah, Avi Angel as Young TJ, Fenton Quinn as Carriage Driver Absent: Lauren Tom as Celia Mack
| 46 | 9 | "Secret Society" | Paul Hoen | Phil Baker | January 25, 2019 | 309 | 0.79 |
Andi, Cyrus and Buffy are informed by Jonah that there is a secret society at Jefferson Middle School, and one of them will be selected to join. Cyrus does not think he will be picked, but he is. Later, Andi is also tapped, but both she and Cyrus stay quiet about the club in front of Buffy. Meanwhile, Bex sees Bowie in a tuxedo that his father wore for his wedding, so she goes shopping for a wedding dress with Celia. When Bex finds the right one, she realizes that Andi is not there to see and holds off on buying it, deciding to show it to her later. Andi is betrayed that she was not involved in the decision, so Bex gives up the dress she wanted. Andi ends up finding another dress that both Bex and Celia agree is the one. Buffy eventually gets selected to join the secret society, but she finds out it is all about Walker asking her to be his fall formal date. Displeased by the silence from her friends, she declines his invitation. Guest stars: Darius Marcell as Walker, George Janko as Ricky
| 47 | 10 | "The Quacks" | Aprill Winney | Erin Dunlap | February 1, 2019 | 310 | 0.84 |
The Jefferson Middle School girls basketball team gets set for their first game, but they are in jeopardy of forfeiting because only four players are present. With the rest of the players deciding not to show up, Buffy adds Andi to the roster. The game is a blowout in favor of their opponents, but Buffy reminds her teammates that their playing at all is an accomplishment in itself. Meanwhile, Amber helps Cyrus with his dance choreography, while Bowie seeks Andi and Bex's opinion on their family name. Also, Jonah is faced with needing to learn sign language, rather than texting, to communicate with Libby, while Buffy reaches out to an old friend, Marty, after rejecting Walker's fall formal proposal. Guest stars: Millicent Simmonds as Libby, Emily Skinner as Amber, Garren Stitt as Marty, Yasmeen Fletcher as Kaitlin, Roni Geva as Mrs. Mendenhall Absent: Lauren Tom as Celia Mack
| 48 | 11 | "One in a Minyan" | Michelle Manning | Jonathan Hurwitz | February 8, 2019 | 311 | 0.76 |
Following the death of Cyrus' grandmother Rose, his family holds shiva to mourn their loss and honor her memory. Andi, Buffy and Jonah attend, as well as Bowie, whose kugel is not received well by the company. One thing Cyrus regrets not telling his grandmother is about his coming out, and he feels it is time to tell Jonah. He goes looking for him, but he then needs to comfort him after seeing him suffer a panic attack. Cyrus eventually tells Jonah that he is gay, mixing it into the conversation about the food. Also during the gathering, Buffy's phone keeps buzzing, and Andi wants to know who is texting her, but Buffy stays silent about it. As Andi is persistent to find out, Buffy finally says it is Marty. TJ arrives at Cyrus' house at the time of this revelation, with no idea who Marty is. Meanwhile, Celia and Andi continue to plan more details about Bex and Bowie's wedding, and they have a disagreement about the centerpiece they will use. Andi gloats because Bex has gone with her choice each time, including the centerpiece. Guest stars: Luke Mullen as TJ, Danny Jacobs as Norman, Jackie Joyner as Leslie
| 49 | 12 | "The Ex Factor" | Paul Hoen | Erin Dunlap | February 22, 2019 | 312 | 0.73 |
Andi, Cyrus and Buffy become suspicious about Jonah when they see him not order anything at The Spoon or after he declines their invitation to go to Adrenaline City. They also notice that he changes his mind when Amber steps in. Eventually, they find out that Jonah's parents are having financial problems after Andi reveals what was on the wish that fell to the ground at the moon festival, which belonged to Jonah. As for Amber's involvement, Andi, Cyrus and Buffy accept that she is helping out Jonah as a friend who can relate to his situation, until they see them kiss. Meanwhile, Bowie runs into Miranda and Morgan again. Miranda promises Bowie that she has improved her parenting, but Bowie sees that overall, she and her daughter have not changed. Celia makes out the wedding invitations, and Bex is about to mail them, but she becomes insecure about getting married after comments from both Miranda and a mailman she confronts. Guest stars: Emily Skinner as Amber, Chloe Hurst as Miranda, Eden Grace Redfield as Morgan
| 50 | 13 | "Mount Rushmore or Less" | Paul Hoen | Suzanne Weber | March 1, 2019 | 313 | 0.79 |
After Principal Metcalf announces Costume Day at school with only two days' notice, Andi and her friends scramble to get a costume ready, deciding on a Mount Rushmore motif. Their commitment to it is jeopardized when Cyrus pairs with TJ on a costume of their own. Buffy and Marty see each other in person for the first time in a while, and Marty reveals he has a girlfriend. With Cyrus bailing on the Mount Rushmore project, Buffy asks Marty to be a part of the costume. Jonah, who tells Andi, Cyrus and Buffy that he and Libby are no longer together, has his hands full with Amber, as she is wanting him to take their rebudding relationship seriously. When Andi sets him straight on his priorities, Jonah ends up dropping out of Mount Rushmore, while Cyrus comes back to that costume, because TJ decided to join Kira on her basketball-themed one. Meanwhile, Andi discovers the wedding invitations that Bex was supposed to mail and becomes disheartened when Bex decides to call the wedding off, as she does not want her "perfect" relationship with Bowie and Andi to be soured by a formal connection. Guest stars: Emily Skinner as Amber, Luke Mullen as TJ, Garren Stitt as Marty, Raquel Justice as Kira Absent: Lauren Tom as Celia Mack
| 51 | 14 | "Hammer Time" | Paul Hoen | Jason Dorris | June 21, 2019 | 314 | 0.62 |
Amber helps Andi release her frustrations about her parents’ canceled wedding by taking her to a rage cage. Bex wants to avoid telling Celia about the wedding until after her birthday. However, during dinner, when Celia notices that Andi, Bex and Bowie are uncomfortable whenever she shows excitement about the wedding, Bex is forced to come clean. Celia angrily leaves the restaurant and stops talking to Bex. Andi later takes her to the rage cage to release the anger. There, Andi meets Amber who admits her frustrations with Jonah because she actually loves him. Meanwhile, Buffy joins Marty for a marathon despite having no training. When she becomes dehydrated, Marty gives up his desire to win and helps her instead. He carries her to finish the race together. Also, Cyrus camps out in his backyard with Jonah to see a meteor shower. Guest stars: Emily Skinner as Amber, Garren Stitt as Marty
| 52 | 15 | "Unloading Zone" | Brent Geisler | Phil Baker | June 21, 2019 | 315 | 0.62 |
Cyrus starts avoiding TJ when he notices TJ spending too much time with Kira. TJ tells Cyrus that he and Kira are just friends. Andi, Buffy, Cyrus and Jonah read about Mint Chip, a clothing company that has been burning clothes worth millions of dollars every year to avoid diluting their brand. To protest, they take the clothes from the company's garbage bins and start giving them out for free. Cyrus takes a cute shirt to TJ at the park but changes his mind when he finds him at the swing set with Kira. He returns to the free sale where he and the rest of the gang are arrested for giving out clothes without the owner's permission. Meanwhile, after receiving a wedding gift from Celia, Bex goes to apologize to her for canceling the wedding, but she refuses to forgive her. Right after, they learn about Andi and her friends' arrest. Guest stars: Luke Mullen as TJ, Raquel Justice as Kira, Ryan Christie as Vivian, Matthew Bellows as Officer Penn
| 53 | 16 | "One Girl's Trash" | Paul Hoen | Elena Song | June 28, 2019 | 316 | 0.60 |
As punishment for their giving away discarded clothes from Mint Chip, Andi, Cyrus, Buffy and Jonah do community service picking up trash. While Andi's friends dread the experience, Andi herself is delighted in finding plenty of crafting materials. At school, Andi discovers her classmates do not really know her after hearing how they describe her, based on her Asian background. This prompts her to work on a huge art project she exhibits at school, aimed at eliminating stereotypes. Jonah asks Amber if she could spend the day with him racing go carts, but as she accepts his invitation, she accidentally blurts that she loves him, which Jonah does not pick up immediately. She says the words "I love you" twice more during their go-carting adventure, but Jonah apparently misinterprets her with the surrounding noise. He later tells Andi that he did hear Amber and fears being in another relationship with her. Meanwhile, Bowie has some regrets about not going through with the wedding after he sees the dress Bex was going to wear. Despite that, he tells her that he wants her to be happy, and she tells him likewise. Guest stars: Emily Skinner as Amber, Felice Heather Monteith as Mrs. Frankel Absent: Lauren Tom as Celia Mack
| 54 | 17 | "Arts and Inhumanities" | Leslie Kolins Small | Sam Wolfson | July 5, 2019 | 317 | 0.60 |
After seeing Andi's artwork display at school, Bex looks into expanding Andi's artistic aptitude. When Andi sees an online application for the Shadyside Academy of Visual Arts in her e-mail, she is overwhelmed by the questions. Bowie suggests that both Andi and Bex tour the SAVA campus in person, and after Andi sees the school for herself, she is convinced she wants to go there. Amber wonders whether anything is wrong with Jonah when he ignores her texts. Jonah says nothing is wrong and covers up what is really going on by telling her that he is learning chess from Cyrus. When Amber confirms that Cyrus cannot play chess, she figures Jonah is lying to her and suggests that he breaks up with her when she overhears the truth from him. As Buffy meets Marty's new girlfriend, Rachel, at the bowling alley, Marty notices Buffy's limping and texts her the number for a foot doctor. Rachel is not pleased and breaks up with Marty after seeing he still has feelings for Buffy. Meanwhile, Buffy's right foot is getting worse with time. Guest stars: Emily Skinner as Amber, Garren Stitt as Marty, Ariana Molkara as Rachel Absent: Lauren Tom as Celia Mack
| 55 | 18 | "Something to Talk A-Boot" | Paul Hoen | Erin Dunlap & Elena Song | July 12, 2019 | 319 | 0.56 |
Andi has completed her online application for SAVA but has second thoughts about submitting it, worrying she may not be good enough to get in. As she ponders over the application on her laptop, she gets surprised by Jonah and decides to seek his advice about what to do, without revealing any details to him. Set to delete her application, Andi gets on her laptop again to discover that SAVA has already received it. Diagnosed with a stress fracture in her right foot, Buffy is on crutches and wearing a boot to protect the foot. While unable to play in the Spikes' final game of the season, she still prepares her players for the game, as the team's captain, despite their lack of confidence. The Spikes manage to play well with Buffy sidelined and secure their first victory. Meanwhile, TJ faces student court after taking a golf cart belonging to the Jefferson Middle School's athletic department, even though he was helping Buffy get to class on time, considering her injury. While Amber is getting over Jonah's break-up with her, she is glad to hear that his father has a new job, and that he and his family are moving into a new place. Guest stars: Emily Skinner as Amber, Luke Mullen as TJ, Anson Bagley as Gus, Yasmeen Fletcher as Kaitlin Absent: Lauren Tom as Celia Mack
| 56 | 19 | "A Moving Day" | Michelle Manning | Suzanne Weber & Sam Wolfson | July 19, 2019 | 320 | 0.60 |
As Jonah and his family prepare to move into their new apartment, Cyrus and Buffy help him transport furniture, crates and other stuff. While looking through one of the crates, Cyrus and Buffy discover videos of Judy Bartholomew, host of a popular web series. When they unexpectedly meet her in person, they find out she is also Jonah's mother. Meanwhile, Bex invites Andi, Bowie and Celia to see a famous but retired chef, claiming that she won a prize to visit his home and be treated to one of his home-cooked meals. They head to Mount Washington, where the chef currently lives, and do plenty of walking. Tired from all the travel, Andi, Bowie and Celia are thinking they are lost, but Bex assures the three they are not. When they finally reach their destination, and see Cyrus and Buffy already there, Bex confesses she made up the whole story about the chef and the meal, but reveals a bigger surprise. She and Bowie get married in this remote location. After the wedding, Andi notices a voicemail on her phone from SAVA. Guest star: Coco Angel as Judy
| 57 | 20 | "We Were Here" | Paul Hoen | Terri Minsky | July 26, 2019 | 321 | 0.65 |
When Celia decides to take another trip, Andi and Bex get set to hold another party at the Mack house. Bex and Bowie have the first dance as newlyweds, in the dress and tuxedo they would have worn at their wedding. Celia later shows up, surprising the guests in a dinosaur costume and realizing how fun the party is. TJ shows up with Kira, but her insensitive comment about Cyrus and seeing how TJ truly feels about him cause the two to split up. Cyrus and TJ talk and discover they have romantic feelings for each other. Buffy and Marty try a normal, banter-free conversation and struggle with it, but Buffy eventually reveals she really likes him. Jonah surprises Andi with the bracelet she made him after they first met, which she thought he had lost. Andi tells everyone that she has been accepted to SAVA after shocking them with her empty shack, as she is now going to need a studio. With her leaving for SAVA, her friends are going to miss her. Jonah takes a picture of Andi, Cyrus and Buffy in front of Andi Shack, in similar fashion to a picture of the three in second grade. Andi pins both pictures inside her shack. Guest stars: Emily Skinner as Amber, Luke Mullen as TJ, Garren Stitt as Marty, Raquel Justice as Kira
