= Joshua Rush =

American actor (born 2001)

- Born: Joshua Nisenson; December 14, 2001 (age 24); Houston, Texas, U.S.
- Other names: Joshua Rush Nisenson; Joshua Nisenson
- Education: University of Utah
- Years active: 2009–present
- Political party: Democratic
- Other political affiliations: Democratic Socialists of America
- Website: joshuaru.sh

External image
- Rush in 2017

Joshua Nisenson (born December 14, 2001), also known as Joshua Rush, is an American actor and political activist. He is known for playing Cyrus Goodman on the Disney Channel series Andi Mack (2017–2019), the first openly-gay character on the network. Rush earned significant praise and media coverage for his performance, as well as a Young Entertainer Award in 2019.

Rush began his career as a child actor, appearing in short films and commercials, and the series Heroes (2009). For his role as Turner in the feature film Parental Guidance (2012), he received two Young Artist Award nominations. His voice roles includes Breehn on the Cartoon Network series Clarence (2014–2016), Bunga on the Disney Junior series The Lion Guard (2016–2019) and the titular character on the DreamWorks series Where's Waldo? (2019–2021).

== Early life and education ==
Rush was born Joshua Nisenson on December 14, 2001, in Houston, Texas, to parents Adam and Beryt (née Kiselstein) Nisenson. His father is a marketing strategist as well as a marriage and family therapist and his mother is a corporate documentary producer. He is Jewish. In December 2019, Rush revealed his intentions to study at New York University's Gallatin School. However, he instead went to the University of Utah, graduating in 2023 with a Bachelor of Arts in political science.

== Career ==
=== Early work (2001–2009) ===
Rush was ten months old when he first appeared in a local television special. By age 2 1/2, he had the ability to identify cars by logo and body style, and was featured on the KHOU morning news in a segment on how to raise "smart kids." Before working on Heroes, Rush appeared on Private Practice, and tailored several film credits, such as Blue Boy, The Journal, and Mindsight. He also acted in commercials for Space Center Houston and Safeco Insurance, and an e-card for americangreetings.com.

In 2009, Rush appeared on The Jay Leno Show as the "Super Duper Nanny Son." The same year he also appeared on Medium as Tanner Campbel, the boy in the banana costume, and on Criminal Minds as Ronny Downey. Rush's first major television role came in 2009 when he was cast on Heroes. He played Zachary Quinto's character, Sylar, at a young age. This recurring role was part of a major plot point in season three. After Heroes, Rush had minor roles on Parenthood, CSI: NY, and Special Agent Oso.

=== Acting breakthrough (2010–2017) ===
In 2010, Rush began portraying a young version of Zachary Levi's character Chuck Bartowski on Chuck. In this role, he worked with such actors as Scott Bakula and Linda Hamilton. Following his work on Chuck, Rush did ADR work on the Hallmark Channel movie November Christmas, and commercials for McDonald's and GameStop. In 2012, Rush appeared as Turner Simmons in the feature film Parental Guidance, which earned him a Young Artist Award nomination as Best Supporting Young Actor Age Ten and Under in a Feature Film.

From 2017 to 2019, he gained prominence through his role as Cyrus Goodman, one of the two best friends of the title character on the Disney Channel series Andi Mack. Rush, who is Jewish, requested Andi Mack creator and executive producer Terri Minsky, also Jewish, to write a bar mitzvah scene for his character, which occurs in Season 2 Episode 13, "Cyrus' Bash-Mitzvah!". Rush's performance was praised, and he is noted for having played the first gay main character on Disney Channel, and the first to have a same-sex love interest, TJ Kippen (Luke Mullen).

Rush also appeared as Jacob in the 2015 thriller film Emelie. He voiced Toby in Netflix and DreamWorks Animation's The Adventures of Puss in Boots and Breehn on Cartoon Network's Clarence. From 2016 to 2019, he voiced Bunga on the Disney Junior series The Lion Guard.

=== Political ventures (2018–present) ===
Rush started a weekly news series on social media in 2018, titled News in a Rush, covering politics and current events in minute-long videos aimed to make younger viewers understand certain topics. Rush volunteered for the 2018 congressional campaigns of Beto O'Rourke, Ben McAdams, Harley Rouda, and Katie Porter. He served as the Under 18 Ambassador for National Absentee Ballot Day.

In 2019, Rush interned at the United States House of Representatives. He told Teen Vogue in an October 2019 interview that he identifies "as a Democrat, probably on the more progressive wing." Rush was a surrogate for the Bernie Sanders 2020 presidential campaign. He then volunteered for Senator Ed Markey's reelection campaign, as well as interviewing several down-ballot congressional candidates. He is a panelist for the Geena Davis Institute on Gender in Media and a member of the Democratic Socialists of America.

In April 2019, it was announced he would voice the titular character in DreamWorks Animation Television series on Universal Kids, Where's Waldo?. In February 2021, Rush announced that he has started a new job as the communications director for the Utah Democratic Party.

In September 2022, Rush visited UNEP where he discussed the recent climate change and the retreat of glaciers since 1850. As of 2023, he is deputy press secretary for California state senator Toni Atkins.

== Personal life ==
Rush came out as bisexual on August 6, 2019. In February 2020, Rush opened up about his parents' divorce and his mental health issues in a Teen Vogue article. He is based between California and Utah.

== Filmography ==
=== Film ===
Year	Title	Role	Notes
2012	Parental Guidance	Turner Simmons	
2013	Saving Lincoln	Tad Lincoln	
2013	Escape from Planet Earth	Young Shanker	Voice role
2014	Mr. Peabody & Sherman	Carl	Voice role
2014	Break Point	Barry	
2015	Emelie	Jacob	
2015	Sex, Death and Bowling	Eli McAllister	

=== Television ===
Year	Title	Role	Notes
2009	Private Practice	Will	1 episode
2009	Medium	Tanner Campbel / Boy in Banana Costume	2 episodes
2009	The Jay Leno Show	Super Duper Nanny Son	1 episode
2009	Criminal Minds	Ronny Downey	1 episode
2009–2010	Heroes	Little Sylar	Recurring role, 6 episodes
2010	CSI: NY	Luke Garito	1 episode
2010	Chuck	Young Chuck	3 episodes
2011	Childrens Hospital	Seth	1 episode
2012	House	Ryan	1 episode
2012	Gravity Falls	Soldier Kid	1 episode
2013	The Cleveland Show	Dudley	1 episode
2014–2016	Clarence	Breehn	Recurring voice role, 15 episodes
2015	40's and Failing	Max	4 episodes
2015	The Lion Guard: Return of the Roar	Bunga	Television film
2015	Bones	Bradley	1 episode
2015–2017	Star vs. the Forces of Evil	Jeremy Birnbaum	Recurring voice role, 5 episodes
2015–2018	The Adventures of Puss in Boots	Toby	Main voice role
2016	The Mr. Peabody & Sherman Show	Wheels	1 episode
2016	The Loud House	Classmate No. 1 / Quarterback	2 episodes
2016–2019	The Lion Guard	Bunga	Main voice role
2017–2019	Andi Mack	Cyrus Goodman	Main role
2019–2021	Where's Waldo?	Waldo	Main voice role

== Awards and nominations ==
Year	Award	Category	Work	Result	Ref.
2012	Young Artist Awards	Best Performance in a Feature Film – Young Ensemble Cast	Parental Guidance	Nominated	
2012	Young Artist Awards	Best Performance in a Feature Film – Supporting Young Actor Ten and Under	Parental Guidance	Nominated	
2019	Young Entertainer Awards	Best Young Ensemble in a Television Series	Andi Mack	Won	
