= Cyrus Goodman =

Character in Andi Mack

- Andi Mack character
- Joshua Rush as Cyrus Goodman in Season 1 Episode 5, "It's Not About You"
- First appearance: "Tomorrow Starts Today" (2017)
- Last appearance: "We Were Here" (2019)
- Created by: Terri Minsky
- Portrayed by: Joshua Rush

In-universe information
- Nicknames: Cy-Guy (by Jonah); Underdog (by TJ); Chocolate Chip Muffin (by TJ)
- Race: Jewish
- Gender: Male (Boy)
- Occupation: Student at Jefferson Middle School
- Significant other: TJ Kippen
- Religion: Judaism
- Nationality: American
- Age: 12 years old (seasons 1–2); 13 years old (seasons 2–3)

Cyrus Goodman is a fictional main character in the American family comedy-drama television series Andi Mack on Disney Channel. The character is portrayed by Joshua Rush and first appeared on television in the pilot episode, "Tomorrow Starts Today". He is the best friend of both Andi Mack and Buffy Driscoll, the title character and a fellow main character, respectively, and attends Jefferson Middle School alongside them.

Cyrus Goodman is notable as the first gay main character on Disney Channel, a distinction that has drawn considerable media attention and was reported in the news as being historic. The series has been nominated for and won awards specifically for Cyrus and his coming out storyline, the introduction of which caused a ratings surge.

== Conception and casting ==
Andi Mack creator and executive producer Terri Minsky has stated in an interview with the Academy of Television Arts & Sciences that the character of Cyrus was inspired by her daughter's friends, most of whom are gay and realized that about themselves when they were middle school students:

[T]he fact that my daughter, most of her close friends are kids who knew at the age of 12, 13, junior high, (Note: In the United States, grades 7–9 were previously organized as junior high school, but grades 6–8 are now organized as middle school. Older Americans may continue to use the former terminology.) that they were gay. I just felt as if, the reality is that Andi would probably have a friend like that.

— Terri Minsky, in an interview with the Academy of Television Arts & Sciences

In August 2016, Andi Mack, created by Lizzie McGuire creator Terri Minsky, was picked up by Disney Channel, with then 14-year-old actor Joshua Rush, the voice of Bunga on the Disney Junior series The Lion Guard, cast as the then 12-year-old Cyrus Goodman. (Note: Cyrus celebrates his bar mitzvah in Season 2 Episode 13, "Cyrus' Bash-Mitzvah!", a coming of age ceremony that is held when a Jewish boy turns 13.)

In March 2017, The New York Times reported on the character in an article about the then-upcoming Disney Channel series prior to its premiere in April 2017.

Actor Joshua Rush, who portrays Cyrus, has stated in interviews with Good Morning America and Us Weekly that he considers it an "honor" for him to be portraying the character, that he is "proud" to portray Cyrus, and that the character is relatable to him because one of his best friends had come out to him first:

I’m really proud to be able to play Cyrus. I think it’s an exciting role to be able to play for Disney. [...] But I think more than anything, it’s an exciting role for these kids that are going to end up seeing Cyrus on their screen and going, "Oh, that’s me! I recognize that and I understand that and I resonate with that." I think it shows those kids that their stories are valid.

— Joshua Rush, in a cast interview with Good Morning America

I was so excited when I first read about it. It’s a real honor. [...] One of my best friends came out to me before anybody else. I wish that I had someone like Buffy on TV to show me how I should have responded.

— Joshua Rush, in an interview with Us Weekly

Disney has stated that it consulted with child development experts as well as Common Sense Media, GLAAD, and PFLAG to develop the character and his coming out storyline.

== Character ==
Cyrus Goodman is the best friend of both Andi Mack and Buffy Driscoll, the title character and a fellow main character, respectively. Along with his friends, he lives in Shadyside in the fictional U.S. state of Midwest and starts the series as a seventh grade student at Jefferson Middle School. The first gay main character on American Disney Channel, Cyrus has come out to Andi, Buffy, and their mutual friend Jonah. Cyrus is Jewish and has celebrated his bar mitzvah, the second depiction of that coming of age ceremony after Lizzie McGuire on Disney Channel.

Cyrus was previously in a relationship with Iris, a girl who Amber and Jonah set him together with, but, while he enjoyed her company because of their shared interests and similar personalities, Cyrus eventually admitted that he had no romantic feelings for her; they amicably broke up and agreed to just be friends. Cyrus previously had a long-term crush on Jonah, which he revealed to Buffy and Andi, but his crush on him later fades away. Cyrus grows close to TJ, the captain of the Jefferson Middle School boys' basketball team, after they bond over their shared personal issues. The two develop feelings for each other and in the series finale, these feelings are made apparent and they hold hands, marking the start of a romantic relationship.

Cyrus enjoys writing screenplays in his free time and playing board games with his friends. His favorite foods are chocolate chip muffins and baby taters.

== Legacy ==
=== Critical reception ===
The character has drawn considerable media attention and Disney's announcement of his coming out was widely reported in the news, both nationally and internationally: BBC News, The Washington Post, ABC News, People, Us Weekly, TVLine, HuffPost, and NPR all described it as "history", while The Hollywood Reporter, Entertainment Weekly, IndieWire, Fortune, the New York Daily News, and the Los Angeles Times all described it as "groundbreaking".

Vogue, E! News, and The Salt Lake Tribune have critiqued the inclusion of the character and his coming out storyline as follows:

Disney has become surprisingly topical. [...] [A]ddressing real-life issues. [...] [A]nother step towards content for kids that is informed by reality. [...] [A]s Cyrus has continued to evolve, he’s been written with respect and nuance. Though he’s dealing with something that sets him apart from his classmates, he is an ordinary kid, not an anomaly.

— Vogue

[T]he benefits of representation are twofold. Not only are you reinforcing the idea to countless scared individuals consuming the media that they exist, they matter and their stories are worth telling, but you're increasing their visibility in a wider landscape, helping to normalize them to a world that may seek to marginalize them or simply ignore them altogether. It's no coincidence that, when then Vice President Joe Biden announced his public support for marriage equality in 2012, he cited Will & Grace as having done more to educate the American public than anything else since. Visibility and accurate representation matter. Period.

— E! News

It’s a process. Cyrus still has a long way to go. So do Andi and Buffy — even in this idealized, fictional world where a middle-schooler feels comfortable coming out to a friend. Maybe kids who watch this show can make the real world more like “Andi Mack.” Shows like this are helping to raise a generation that understands what a better world looks like.

— The Salt Lake Tribune

LGBTQ rights organizations, including GLAAD, PFLAG, and Stonewall, all lauded Disney's inclusion of a character that "reflects the lives and lived experiences" of LGBT youth. Pride commented that the romantic moment between Cyrus and TJ in the series finale is "both the first and the last we get from the Disney Channel’s first real queer relationship between two main characters. It’s an appropriately gentle moment for a show that’s handled its gay character and his storylines in such a relatable human manner. And while fans are sad this is the last moment of Cyrus and TJ...it was certainly an important one."

=== Awards and achievements ===
Cyrus Goodman is the first gay main character and the first character to have uttered the phrase "I'm gay" on Disney Channel.

Andi Mack won the 2018 GLAAD Media Award for Outstanding Kids & Family Programming and the 2018 Academy of Television Arts & Sciences award for Television with a Conscience, specifically for Cyrus Goodman and his coming out storyline.

The introduction of the character's coming out storyline caused the series to experience a ratings surge.

=== Censorship and controversy ===
Andi Mack was censored in Kenya by the Kenya Film Classification Board, criticized by the One Million Moms division of the American Family Association, and voluntarily axed by Disney from air throughout the Middle East and Africa on account of "cultural sensibilities", because of the character and his coming out storyline.

== See also ==
- Howard and Harold McBride of The Loud House, the first married gay couple on Nickelodeon
- Good Luck Charlie, the first Disney Channel series to feature a married gay couple
- The Legend of Korra, the first Nickelodeon animated series to feature LGBT characters
- Doc McStuffins, the first Disney Junior animated series to feature a married gay couple
