= Andi Mack =

American television series

- Genre: Family comedy-drama
- Created by: Terri Minsky
- Starring: Peyton Elizabeth Lee; Joshua Rush; Sofia Wylie; Asher Angel; Lilan Bowden; Lauren Tom; Trent Garrett
- Theme music composer: Amit Ofir; Shridhar Solanki; Erika Nuri Taylor
- Opening theme: "Tomorrow Starts Today" by Sabrina Carpenter
- Composer: Jacob Yoffee
- Country of origin: United States
- Original language: English
- No. of seasons: 3
- No. of episodes: 57 (list of episodes)

Production
- Executive producers: Terri Minsky; Michelle Manning
- Producers: Greg A. Hampson; Jeff T. Miller; Paul Hoen
- Cinematography: Matthew Williams
- Camera setup: Single-camera
- Running time: 18–28 minutes
- Production companies: Go Dog Go; MM Productions; Horizon Productions

Original release
- Network: Disney Channel
- Release: April 7, 2017 – July 26, 2019

Andi Mack is an American family comedy-drama television series created by Terri Minsky that premiered on Disney Channel on April 7, 2017. It ran for three seasons and 57 episodes, concluding on July 26, 2019. The series stars Peyton Elizabeth Lee, Joshua Rush, Sofia Wylie, Asher Angel, Lilan Bowden, Lauren Tom, and Trent Garrett. It follows 13-year-old Andi Mack and her best friends, Cyrus Goodman and Buffy Driscoll, as they attend middle school.

Andi Mack was, for a time, the top-rated series on cable television among children ages 6–14. It is the first series on Disney Channel to feature a gay main character, Cyrus Goodman, a distinction that has drawn considerable media attention and was reported in the news as being historic. The series has been nominated for and won awards for his coming out storyline, the introduction of which caused a ratings surge.

== Plot ==
=== Season 1 ===
On the night of her thirteenth birthday, Andi Mack's world is turned upside down when she discovers that the woman she believed to be her sister, Bex, is actually her mother. Andi joins her middle school frisbee team to get close to Jonah, whom both she and her best friend Cyrus are developing romantic feelings for, while also competing with Jonah's high school girlfriend Amber. Andi reveals her family revelation to her best friends, Cyrus and Buffy, and begins to embrace her mother Bex and bond with her newfound father Bowie.

=== Season 2 ===
Andi tries to convince her parents, Bex and Bowie, to marry each other, but neither proposal is successful. Jonah breaks up with Amber. Cyrus comes out to Buffy. Buffy joins the basketball team and is later asked by her math teacher to tutor the team captain, TJ; when TJ becomes ineligible to be on the team due to his math grades, Cyrus gives him advice about his learning disability to allow him to play. Cyrus comes out to Andi. Andi and Jonah enter into a relationship. Buffy seemingly moves far away, but it is later revealed that she still lives nearby. Bex competes with a town local, Miranda, for Bowie's affection, while conflict ensues between Andi and Miranda's daughter Morgan, which eventually leads Bowie to criticize Miranda for causing him to distrust his daughter Andi; Bex and Bowie rekindle their relationship.

=== Season 3 ===
Bex and Bowie are engaged. Andi tells Jonah that she would like to just be friends with him, to which he agrees. Buffy is dating Walker, which makes Andi uncomfortable. Cyrus joins TJ and his two friends Reed and Lester on a dirt biking adventure, but when Cyrus discovers that Reed has a gun, he tells Principal Metcalf and is later questioned about it by a police officer after TJ reported the incident to the police. Buffy attempts to improve the girls' basketball team, but they are crushed by their opponents in their first game. Cyrus comes out to Jonah. Costume Day is held at Jefferson Middle School. Bex cancels her planned wedding to Bowie. Andi, Cyrus, Buffy, and Jonah are arrested for giving out a company's thrown away clothes for free without the owner's permission. Buffy gets a foot injury which causes her to sit out her team's games for the rest of the season. Andi's art project to combat stereotypes gets a lot of attention, leading her to apply and get accepted to a magnet school for visual arts. Bex plans a surprise wedding for her and Bowie. Marty's girlfriend breaks up with him because of his feelings for Buffy. After denying their feelings for each other, Buffy and Marty eventually admit to liking each other. When Buffy kicks Kira out of her basketball team, Kira befriends TJ to get back at Buffy by hurting Cyrus. Eventually, TJ stands up to Kira, after which he and Cyrus acknowledge their feelings for each other by holding hands.

== Episodes ==
Season	Episodes	Originally released	
Season	Episodes	First released	Last released
1	12	April 7, 2017	June 23, 2017
2	25	October 27, 2017	August 13, 2018
3	20	October 8, 2018	July 26, 2019

== Cast and characters ==
=== Main ===
- Peyton Elizabeth Lee as Andi Mack, a seventh grade student at Jefferson Middle School and the title character
- Joshua Rush as Cyrus Goodman, a seventh grade student at Jefferson Middle School, best friend of Andi, and the first gay main character on Disney Channel
- Sofia Wylie as Buffy Driscoll, a seventh grade student at Jefferson Middle School, best friend of Andi, and captain of the Jefferson Middle School girls' basketball team
- Asher Angel as Jonah Beck, an eighth grade student at Jefferson Middle School, Andi's ex-boyfriend, and captain of the Jefferson Middle School frisbee team
- Lilan Bowden as Rebecca "Bex" Mack, Andi's mother; previously believed by Andi to be her sister
- Lauren Tom as Celia Mack, Andi's grandmother; previously believed by Andi to be her mother
- Trent Garrett as Bowie (Note: Bowie's real first name is revealed to be Steven in "Cookie Monster".) Quinn (recurring, seasons 1–2; main, season 3), Andi's father; previously unknown to Andi

=== Recurring ===
- Stoney Westmoreland as Henry "Ham" Mack, (Note: Ham's last appearance is in "The New Girls", following Stoney Westmoreland's termination from the series and Disney Channel on December 14, 2018) Andi's grandfather; previously believed by Andi to be her father
- Emily Skinner as Amber, a ninth grade high school student, Jonah's ex-girlfriend, and waitress at The Spoon diner
- Chelsea T. Zhang as Brittany (seasons 1–2), a close friend of Bex and her employer
- Garren Stitt as Marty, a student at Jefferson Middle School and a member of the Jefferson Middle School track team
- Luke Mullen as TJ (seasons 2–3), the captain of the Jefferson Middle School boys' basketball team who has dyscalculia and is Cyrus' love interest; his full name is revealed to be Thelonious Jagger Kippen in "We Were Here"
- Chloe Hurst as Miranda (seasons 2–3), a woman who works at a plant nursery with Bowie and goes out with him for a time
- Darius Marcell as Walker (seasons 2–3), a young artist who first meets Andi at Cyrus' bar mitzvah as the hired caricature artist
- Raquel Justice as Kira (season 3), a transfer student and talented basketball player who clashes with Buffy and tries to get between Cyrus and TJ

== Production ==
Development of the series began in 2015 when Disney Channels Worldwide president Gary Marsh convinced writer and producer Terri Minsky to consider developing another series for Disney Channel. Minsky had created the popular sitcom Lizzie McGuire, which aired from 2001 to 2004, but was initially reluctant to create another teen-oriented series. Minsky eventually found inspiration for the series in an article on how actor Jack Nicholson had learned as an adult that the woman he believed to be his sister was actually his mother. Disney Channel ordered a pilot based on the concept in November 2015, and subsequently ordered Andi Mack to series in August 2016. The series started filming in Salt Lake City in September 2016, and finished filming in December 2016.

The first episode became available on the Disney Channel App, On-Demand, Disney Channel's YouTube, iTunes, Amazon, and Google Play on March 10, 2017, while the second episode became available the same day via Disney Channel On-Demand as well as to subscribers using the Disney Channel App. The series premiered on Disney Channel on April 7, 2017. A total of 13 episodes were ordered for the first season; however, only 12 episodes were aired.

Disney Channel renewed the series for a second season on May 25, 2017. The filming of the second season began in July 2017.

On August 20, 2017, five additional episodes were ordered for the second season. One week prior to the season two premiere, a music video for the full version of the series' theme song was released, starring the entire cast. On October 25, 2017, TVLine revealed that in the second season, Cyrus would begin to realize that he has romantic feelings for Jonah, following through from several hints in the first season, making him the first gay main character with a coming out storyline (Note: British series The Lodge was the first Disney Channel series to feature a coming out scene with Josh (Joshua Sinclair-Evans) mentioning that girls are not his type.) on Disney Channel. The second season premiered on Disney Channel on October 27, 2017.

On February 19, 2018, Disney Channel announced that Andi Mack had been renewed for a third season, with the cast informed about the renewal live on Good Morning America by the creator that day. The third season premiered on October 8, 2018. On November 13, 2018, Deadline Hollywood reported that the series would be featuring a two-episode arc—"Cookie Monster" and "The New Girls"—revolving around gun safety and peer pressure. On December 14, 2018, Deadline Hollywood reported that Stoney Westmoreland was fired by Disney Channel because of his arrest by the Salt Lake City Police Department on charges of "enticing a minor" and "dealing in materials harmful to a minor", with scenes from episodes yet to air that would have featured him removed.

On April 24, 2019, it was announced that Andi Mack would end after its third season and the series finale would premiere on July 26, 2019.

== Reception ==
=== Critical ===
The series has been praised for accurately representing the lives of young teenagers, with examples including a learning disability, panic attacks, a bar mitzvah, and the unplanned pregnancy of the mother of the title character. It has also been praised for normalizing the Asian-American experience as being diverse and multi-dimensional, and therefore normalizing diversity. It is the first series on Disney Channel to feature a gay main character, Cyrus Goodman, a distinction which has drawn considerable media attention and was reported in the news as being historic and groundbreaking. Andi Mack became the first series on Disney Channel in which a character has used the phrase "I'm gay", which occurs when Cyrus comes out to Jonah in "One in a Minyan".

=== Ratings ===
The series is the top-rated series on cable television among all children ages 6–14. The introduction of the coming out storyline caused the series to experience a ratings surge.

Viewership and ratings per season of Andi Mack
Season	Episodes	First aired		Last aired		Avg. viewers (millions)
Season	Episodes	Date	Viewers (millions)	Date	Viewers (millions)	Avg. viewers (millions)
1	12	April 7, 2017	1.24	June 23, 2017	1.94	1.39
2	25	October 27, 2017	1.62	August 13, 2018	1.05	1.18
3	20	October 8, 2018	0.90	July 26, 2019	0.65	0.72

=== Awards and nominations ===
The series is the first on Disney Channel to feature a coming out storyline, for which it has been nominated for and won awards, including the 2018 GLAAD Media Award for Outstanding Kids & Family Programming and the 2018 Academy of Television Arts & Sciences award for Television with a Conscience.

Year	Award	Category	Recipient	Result	Ref.
2018	GLAAD Media Award	Outstanding Kids & Family Programming	Andi Mack	Won	
2018	British LGBT Awards	Media Moment of the Year	Cyrus comes out on Andi Mack	Nominated	
2018	Peabody Awards	Children's & Youth Programming	Andi Mack	Nominated	
2018	Television Academy Honors	Television with a Conscience	Andi Mack	Won	
2018	BAFTA Children's Awards	International Live Action	Andi Mack	Nominated	
2019	Writers Guild Awards	Children's Episodic and Specials	"For the Last Time" by Jonathan S. Hurwitz	Nominated	
2019	Kids' Choice Awards	Favorite Female TV Star	Peyton Elizabeth Lee	Nominated	
2019	GLAAD Media Award	Outstanding Kids & Family Programming	Andi Mack	Nominated	
2019	Young Entertainer Awards	Best Young Ensemble in a Television Series	Peyton Elizabeth Lee, Joshua Rush, Sofia Wylie, Asher Angel	Won	
2019	Young Entertainer Awards	Best Leading Young Actress in a Television Series	Sofia Wylie	Nominated	
2019	NAMIC Vision Awards	Children's	Andi Mack	Nominated	
2019	BAFTA Children's Awards	International Live Action	Andi Mack	Nominated	
2020	Casting Society of America	Children's Pilot and Series (Live Action)	Amber Horn, Danielle Aufiero and Steven Tylor O’Connor	Won	
2020	GLAAD Media Awards	Outstanding Kids & Family Programming	Andi Mack	Nominated	
