= Murderville =

Comedic murder-mystery television series

- Genre: Murder-mystery; Procedural crime; Surreal humor
- Based on: Murder in Successville by: Andy Brereton; Avril Spary
- Developed by: Krister Johnson
- Starring: Will Arnett; Haneefah Wood; Lilan Bowden; Phillip Smithey
- Narrated by: Will Arnett; Steven Zirnkilton (opening narration)
- Country of origin: United States
- Original language: English
- No. of seasons: 1
- No. of episodes: 7

Production
- Executive producers: Will Arnett; Krister Johnson; Marc Forman; Jonathan Stern; Peter Principato; Brian Steinberg; Tom Davis; Andy Brereton; James De Frond
- Running time: 29–35 minutes; 52 minutes (special)
- Production companies: Electric Avenue; Abominable Pictures; Mister Krister; Artists First; Tiger Aspect Productions

Original release
- Network: Netflix
- Release: February 3 – December 15, 2022

Murderville is an American comedic murder-mystery television series with improvised elements developed by Krister Johnson for Netflix. The series is based on the BBC Three television series Murder in Successville. Murderville premiered on February 3, 2022, with the release of all six episodes of the first season.

In the original British series, many of the town's residents (including all the murder suspects) are well-known celebrities, played by impersonators. By contrast, in Murderville, the suspects are simply fictional characters.

A Christmas special premiered on December 15, 2022.

== Premise ==
In the town of Murderville, Terry Seattle is a senior detective of the Murderville Police Department and the ex-husband of Rhonda Jenkins-Seattle who works as the chief of police. In each episode, a guest star plays the role of a rookie detective that Rhonda assigns to Terry on a murder investigation. However, the guest is not given a script beforehand and must improvise through the police procedural while attempting to solve the crime.

After meeting at the police station, the detectives visit the murder scene or coroner, then interview three suspects. Typically, the first suspect is questioned in an interrogation room or private office, the second in a location with numerous distractions, and the third involves undercover operations in disguise – often with Terry feeding questions to the rookie through an earpiece. The three suspects are then brought together and Rhonda arrives with uniformed police officers to hear the rookie explain who committed the crime and what clues led them to their determination. Rhonda then reveals if they are correct or not, the clues that were available, and orders the culprit arrested – while firing the rookie if they chose the wrong suspect.

== Cast and characters ==
=== Main ===
- Will Arnett as Terry Seattle, a clumsy senior detective who is going through divorce proceeding with Rhonda. He has a hard time getting over the death of his former partner Lori Griffin who died 15 years prior to the beginning of the series. He also has a tough time getting over his divorce with Rhonda.
- Haneefah Wood as Rhonda Jenkins-Seattle, the chief of police who is in divorce proceedings with Terry
- Lilan Bowden as Amber Kang, a coroner who assists Terry and the respective guest on the murder
- Phillip Smithey as Darren "Daz" Phillips, a detective who starts dating Rhonda and has a poor co-worker relationship with Terry. Smithey did not appear in the holiday special.

=== Co-stars ===
These actors only appear as themselves for one episode within their respective season:

- Conan O'Brien (season 1)
- Marshawn Lynch (season 1; special guest, special)
- Kumail Nanjiani (season 1)
- Annie Murphy (season 1)
- Sharon Stone (season 1)
- Ken Jeong (season 1)
- Jason Bateman (special)
- Maya Rudolph (special)
- Pete Davidson (special)

=== Guest stars ===
==== Season 1 ====
- Alison Becker as Deb Melton, a former magician's assistant who works as a waitress.
- Mary Hollis Inboden as Kathy, the head of an anti-magician movement.
- David Wain as Magic Melvin, a magician.
- Rob Huebel as:
  - Charles Worthington, the son of Cora Washington who succeeds her in the family business.
  - Chester Worthington, the son of Cora Washington and the family outcast who is a doomsdayer and has established his bunker as his own independent nation.
  - Chadd Worthington, the son of Cora Washington who is a failing influencer.
- Ian Gomez as Kevin Rivera, the former business partner of billionaire Seth Gourley.
- Jay Larson as Brad Torker, a former school jock.
- Erinn Hayes as Lisa Capabianco, a former student.
- Nina Pedrad as Nanette Dubois, a chef.
- Erica Hernandez as Ms. Anya Campbell, a kindergarten teacher.
- John Ennis as Vinnie Palmieri, the crime boss of the Food Truck Mafia.
- Irene White as Dr. Jocelyn Alexander, the hospital administrator.
- Samantha Cutaran as Dr. Maddison Chen, the ex-girlfriend of Sebastian Pierce.
- Josh Banday as Dr. Will Gonzalez, an anesthesiologist.
- Nicole Sullivan as Rebecca Hendricks, an entrepreneur.
- Peter Giles as Seamus Doyle, an incarcerated Irish Mob enforcer.
- Phil LaMarr as Donald Barton, the police commissioner of the Murderville Police Department.

==== Special ====
- Kurt Braunohler as Jim Trently, a sportscaster.
- Courtney Parchman as Mia Briggs, the assistant of Johnny Briggs.
- Eliza Coupe as Donna Foccacia, an investor.
- Dennice Cisneros as Angie, the girlfriend of Jim.

=== Special guest stars ===
- Jennifer Aniston as Lori Griffin (season 1), Terry's former partner who was murdered 15 years ago. She only appears in a photograph hanging in Terry's office. Aniston is given a "special thanks" credit in the season one finale.
- Sean Hayes as Johnny Blaze (special), a professional football player who is murdered while dressed as Santa Claus
- Tawny Newsome as Mayor Palmer (special), the Mayor of Murderville who helps Terry and the detectives solve the murder of Johnny Blaze.

== Episodes ==
=== Series overview ===
Series overview
Season	Episodes	Originally released
1	6	February 3, 2022
Special		December 15, 2022

=== Season 1 (2022) ===
No. overall	No. in season	Title	Special guest detective	Directed by	Written by	Original release date
1	1	"The Magician's Assistant"	Conan O'Brien	Brennan Shroff	Teleplay by : Marina Cockenberg & Krister Johnson	February 3, 2022
Terry arrives at the station and is confronted by Rhonda who introduces him to his new partner Conan. Terry tells Conan about his former partner Lori Griffin who was murdered 15 years prior. Before long, both are tasked by Rhonda to solve the murder of a magician's assistant named Sarah. The two interview three suspects: the former magician's assistant Deb who works as a waitress, the rival magician Magic Melvin, and the anti-magician movement leader Kathy. After putting the clues together, Conan declares that Magic Melvin is the killer. Rhonda confirms that he is correct and thanks him for his work as Magic Melvin is arrested.
2	2	"Triplet Homicide"	Marshawn Lynch	Brennan Shroff	Krister Johnson & Kerry O'Neill	February 3, 2022
Terry grieves the loss of his great-aunt. However, Rhonda reveals that Terry's great-aunt died of old age and it has been twelve years since she passed. Rhonda assigns him his new partner Marshawn. After Terry and Marshawn bond over the urn, Rhonda sends them to investigate a recent case, one about the murder of Cora Worthington, an 84-year-old woman who became wealthy by designing dolls. The suspects include her triplet sons: Cora's successor and former partner Charles who had a doll redesign turned down by her, family outcast Chester who sued Cora for trying to evict him and started preparing for doomsday, and failing influencer Chadd who has a gambling problem and was cut off by Cora. After interviewing them, Marshawn concludes that Charles is the killer, but Rhonda reveals he is incorrect and the real killer was Chester. Marshawn is fired by Rhonda for his incorrect conclusion and Chester is arrested. Terry apologizes to Marshawn that things didn't work out for him.
3	3	"Most Likely to Commit Murder"	Kumail Nanjiani	Iain K. Morris	Anna Drezen	February 3, 2022
To avoid his high school reunion because he was known for fainting and farting at the same time, Terry works the night shift whilst Rhonda is headed for a date. Before she leaves she introduces Terry to his next partner Kumail. The two then learn that tech billionaire Seth Gourley was murdered at Terry's high school reunion, forcing Terry to attend after all. Together, Terry and Kumail interview three suspects: Seth's former business partner Kevin Riviera, former school jock Brad Torker, and former student Lisa Capobianco. After putting all of the clues together, Kumail concludes that Brad is the killer. Rhonda reveals that he is correct and Brad is arrested. Terry learns that her date was Detective Daz. Then he ends up fainting and farting.
4	4	"Murder by Soup"	Annie Murphy	Iain K. Morris	Marina Cockenberg & Krister Johnson	February 3, 2022
Upset about Rhonda dating Daz, Terry brings donuts for everyone in the station except for him. Rhonda introduces Terry to his first female partner, Annie. Annie learns that Terry has been sleeping in his office, causing it to be very cluttered. Rhonda orders the duo to solve the murder of chief health inspector Alistair Hale who died at city hall after digesting poisoned soup. They interview three suspects: chef Nanette DuBois, kindergarten teacher Ms. Anya Cortez, and food truck mafia boss Vinny Palmeiri. After analyzing the clues, Annie concludes that Anya is the killer. Rhonda reveals that she is correct, has Anya arrested, and thanks her for her help.
5	5	"Heartless"	Sharon Stone	Iain K. Morris	Hannah Levy & Adriana Robles	February 3, 2022
Terry has been roped into a blatant pyramid scheme called SLUDG. Rhonda assigns his new partner Sharon whom Terry tells not to fall in love with him. The two quickly learn of the recent murder of Sebastian Pierce, a surgeon at City General Hospital. They investigate three suspects: hospital administrator Jocelyn Alexander, Sebastian's ex-girlfriend Maddison Chen, and anesthesiologist Dr. Will Gonzalez. After analyzing the clues, Sharon concludes that Maddison is the killer. Rhonda reveals that she is incorrect and that Dr. Will is the real killer. Sharon is fired from her job and Dr. Will is arrested. Later that night, Terry answers a call to Lori's desk phone from a man who states that he has information about her murder.
6	6	"The Cold Case"	Ken Jeong	Iain K. Morris	Jack Kukoda	February 3, 2022
Continuing from the last episode, Terry convinces Rhonda to re-investigate the murder of Lori Griffin. She gives him the okay while introducing his new partner Ken. Ken and Terry collect clues by recreating the crime scene from the night Lori was murdered. They interview three suspects: Seamus Doyle, an Irish mob enforcer who is currently in prison; entrepreneur Rebecca Hendricks who is on the panel of a Shark Tank-type show called Den of Snakes where Ken pitches the Ice Breakerz project; and the police commissioner Donald Barton who Terry and Rhonda answer to. After putting the clues together, Ken declares that Donald is the killer. Rhonda reveals that he is incorrect and that Rebecca is the culprit. However, Terry realizes that all three suspects had a role in Lori's murder: Rebecca hired Seamus to terrorize the small community so that Rebecca could put her building in and she bribed Donald to have the police officers look the other way. They are all arrested and Rhonda prepares to move into her new unit in the building due to Terry's false claim of knowing the King of Finland. She does allow Terry to move back into her old house once the divorce is finalized. Terry and Ken then walk off to find a way to get their Ice Breakerz product mass-produced as the credits roll.

=== Special (2022) ===
No. overall	No. in season	Title	Special guest detective(s)	Directed by	Written by	Original release date
7	1	"Who Killed Santa? A Murderville Murder Mystery"	Jason Bateman, Maya Rudolph and Pete Davidson	Laura Murphy	Krister Johnson	December 15, 2022
After finalizing his divorce with Rhonda, Terry is introduced to his new partner Jason. Just like Terry, Jason is tasked to provide security for a Santa Claus meet and greet at the City Hall. Upon their arrival, the Santa — quarterback Johnny Blaze — is lethally stabbed with a candy cane. Terry and Jason are tasked by Mayor Palmer to find the killer. They first interview Jim Trently, a sportscaster who had ties to Johnny. After being introduced to their second partner Maya, the team then interrogates Mia Briggs, Johnny's assistant. Terry sends Maya and Jason undercover to interrogate Donna Foccacia, an investor who is angry at Johnny for backing out of a deal. After swiftly being introduced to fourth detective Pete, the team finalizes their guesses on who the murderer is. Maya believes it is Mayor Palmer, Jason believes that Johnny committed suicide, and Pete believes it was Terry. After learning they are all wrong, Jim Trently admits to killing Santa with the help of his girlfriend Angie. Jim and Angie are arrested and the bomb is disarmed. Terry dresses as Santa to deliver the presents to the orphanage which he carelessly distributes. However, he mistakes a present containing noise-cancelling headphones as being for him instead of an orphan (also named Terry), much to the dismay of the orphanage owner.

== Production ==
Krister Johnson serves as showrunner. Anna Drezen, Chadd Gindin, Craig Rowin, Jack Kukoda, Marina Cockenberg, Kerry O'Neill, Hannah Levy, and Adriana Robles also serve as writers. Iain K. Morris and Brennan Shroff shared director duties for each episode. The series was filmed in mid-2021. Murderville was released on February 3, 2022, on Netflix.

According to an interview Will Arnett gave in December 2025, Murderville was not officially canceled, but Netflix was not funding more episodes. Arnett said he had argued to Netflix that the show cost practically nothing to produce, but has nevertheless been unable to procure the required funding.

== Reception ==
The review aggregator website Rotten Tomatoes reported a 74% approval rating with an average rating of 6.4/10, based on 35 critic reviews. The website's critics consensus reads, "Murderville's improvisational premise can lead to stretches of dead air, but the moments of spontaneous inspiration are worthwhile—and it helps to have Will Arnett on the case." Metacritic, which uses a weighted average, assigned a score of 65 out of 100 based on 17 critics, indicating "generally favorable reviews".

Kathryn VanArendonk of Vulture praised the show's concept, writing, "Arnett's flexibility and playfulness are key to making Murderville work, but strong celebrity casting is what keeps its fairly predictable shtick from getting boring."

The Guardian's Jack Seale felt that the original BBC series "was a startling flash of bottled chaos that deserves to be cherished. It doesn't deserve the new US remake, Murderville (Netflix), which hacks off the concept's eccentric rough edges, then makes a mess of the less interesting show that's left."

== See also ==
- Thank God You're Here - American version of an Australian TV series with a similar concept.
