= Garren Stitt =

American actor

Garren Lake Stitt
- Born: Alexandria, Virginia, U.S.
- Other name: Garren Lake
- Occupations: Actor; musician
- Years active: 2011–2022
- Website: www.garrenlake.com

Garren Lake Stitt, often credited as either Garren Lake or LAKE!, is an American actor and singer. He is best known for his roles in General Hospital and Andi Mack with the former earning him a Daytime Emmy Award nomination for Outstanding Younger Actor in a Drama Series.

== Personal life ==
Stitt was born in Alexandria, Virginia. His mother is Brazilian. When he was 3 years old, he moved to California with his single mother, Yvette, and his older brother, Gabriel.

== Career ==
=== Acting ===
Stitt started acting in 2011 with short films and minor television roles. In 2013, he was cast in his first film roles; Love Triangle, the James Franco directed film, Bukowski, and No Ordinary Hero: The SuperDeafy Movie. His first recurring TV role was as Connor in 4 episodes of Nicky, Ricky, Dicky & Dawn.

Stitt landed the major recurring role of Marty (nicknamed Marty from the Party), a competitive charmer on Buffy Driscoll's track team, in Disney Channel's Andi Mack. He temporarily left the show during the second season to film General Hospital but returned for the third.

Stitt replaced Rio Mangini as Oscar Nero on General Hospital in 2017, a role for which he received a 2019 Daytime Emmy nomination for Outstanding Younger Actor in a Drama Series. He left when his character died in 2019.

=== Music ===
In 2021, Stitt started releasing pop music under the name LAKE!, he released his debut single "Dead Roses" in February 2021. The song was described as a "hip hop-alternative track" which finds Lake taking more of a "808 trap drum-driven and melodic pop sound".

== Filmography ==
=== Film ===
Year	Title	Role	Notes
2012	Bear		Short film
2012	The Lady in Pink Show	Samuel	Short film
2013	Death is a Salesman	Kid	Short film
2013	Love Triangle	Christopher	
2013	Bukowski	Rick	
2013	No Ordinary Hero: The SuperDeafy Movie	Sammy the Bully	
2013	Zombeo & Juliécula	Shawn	Short film
2014	Tom Sawyer & Huckleberry Finn	Young boy (uncredited)	
2015	Designer Pups	Caden	
2016	Is That a Gun in Your Pocket?	Lance Keely	

=== Television ===
Year	Title	Role	Notes
2011	Morbid Minutes	Young Tom	Episode: "The Game"
2012	Girl Crazy	Young Marcus	1 episode
2012	Up in Arms	Little Kid #4	Episode: "Hungry Games"
2014	Unusual Suspects	Kenny Conrick	Episode: "Death of Innocence"
2014–2015	Nicky, Ricky, Dicky & Dawn	Connor	4 episodes
2016	Rosewood	Oliver Jacott	Episode: "Eddie & the Empire State of Mind"
2017–2019	Andi Mack	Marty	Recurring role
2017–2019	General Hospital	Oscar Nero	

== Awards and nominations ==
Year	Award	Category	Work	Result	Ref.
2019	Daytime Emmy Award	Outstanding Younger Actor in a Drama Series	General Hospital	Nominated	
