= Lilan Bowden =

American actress (born 1985)

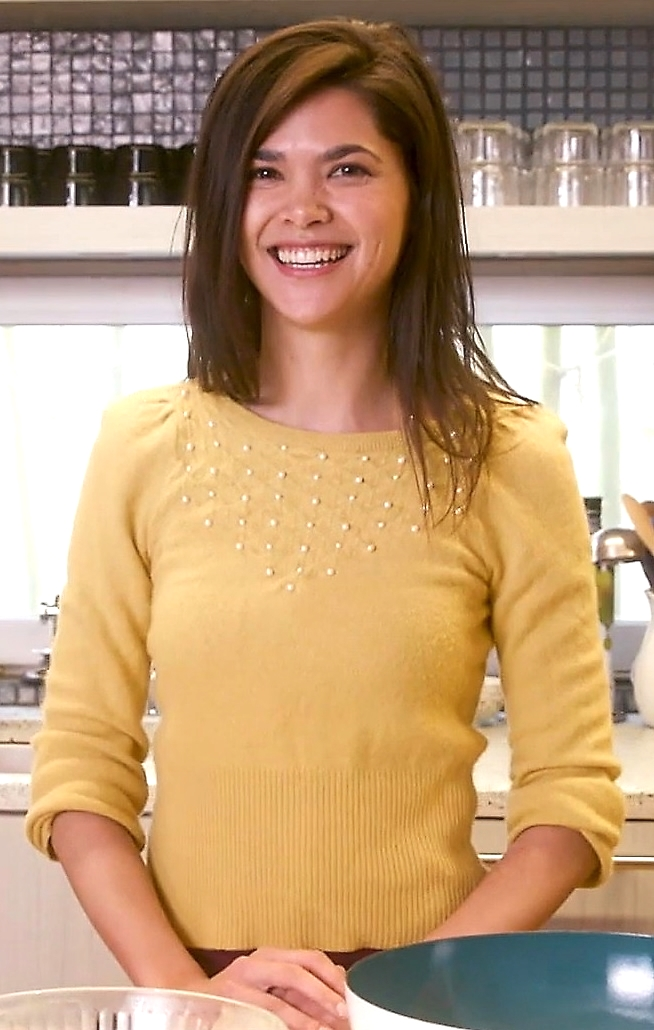
- Bowden in 2018
- Born: Alice Lilan Bowden; September 1, 1985 (age 41); Castro Valley, California, U.S.
- Education: Castro Valley High School
- Alma mater: University of California, Irvine
- Occupation: Actress
- Years active: 2007–present
- Partner(s): Nick Mandernach (2019–present; engaged)
- Children: 1

Alice Lilan Bowden (born September 1, 1985) is an American actress. She is best known for her roles as Rebecca "Bex" Mack in Andi Mack and Amber Kang in the Netflix series Murderville.

== Biography ==
She attended Castro Valley High School where she had joined an improv club and graduated in 2002. Bowden attended University of California, Irvine where she continued to perform in comedy. After graduating, she moved to Los Angeles and joined the Upright Citizens Brigade. She also began writing videos with her writing partner Wilder Smith, featured on Funny or Die during this time.

Bowden began auditioning for roles which was made difficult due to her mixed race heritage. "The roles you get as a minority usually cluster in certain category...I felt like every year I was going out and testing for at least one pilot where I was the sassy, ethnic best friend...I still think that we have a lot of work to do as far as entertaining someone who’s not white for the lead role of TV shows." She suddenly auditioned for the show Andi Mack and got the role of Bex, the single young mother of the title character. "I feel like I hit the jackpot!...It’s so exciting to be a part of a female dominant cast that is an Asian American family and doesn’t fit the model minority." She added that she finds the positive message of the show enticing and feels that she earned the role through perseverance.

Bowden directed the 2020 short film, Becoming Eddie.

== Personal life ==
In 2022, Bowden joined current and past Disney employees who criticized Bob Chapek for refusing to criticize anti-LGBT legislation that was passed in Florida. Bowden came out bisexual on Twitter in March 2022.

She endorsed Eunisses Hernandez, Hugo Soto-Martinez, and Kenneth Mejia during the 2022 Los Angeles elections.

In 2019, Bowden started dating actor, writer, and producer, Nick Mandernach. They became engaged in August 2022 after 3 years of dating.

On May 16, 2023, Bowden announced she was pregnant with their first child.

On July 30, 2023, Bowden revealed she had given birth to their son.

== Filmography ==
=== Filmmaking credits ===
- Becoming Eddie (2020)

=== Film ===
Year	Title	Role	Notes
2008	Sex and the USA	Risa Reagan	
2010	Life After LOST: Ethan Adopts	Betty	Short film; also writer
2010	Interactive Lower Back Tattoos		Short film
2010	The Year That I Was Born	Anna	Short film
2010	Running South	Dream Girl #3	Short film
2011	Princess and the Pony	Chinese News Reporter	Direct-to-Video
2011	Kate Plus 8: College Years	Leah Gosselin	Short film
2011	Toddlers and Tiaras: Where Are They Now?	Pageant Mother	Short film
2011	Zombie Apocalypse	Myrah	Direct-to-Video
2012	Nazis at the Center of the Earth	May Yun	Direct-to-Video
2012	I Survived: Celebrity Massages		Short film
2012	Robby's Birthday	Darlene	Short film
2012	Rise of the Zombies	Jun Nagase	Direct-to-Video
2012	Happy Place		Short film
2013	Sexy Single Solutions	Sexy Hotline Single	Short film
2013	The Gravity Gun	Alyx Vance	Short film
2013	A Leading Man	Andrea	
2013	Lilan and Wilder Get Up Early	Lilan	Short film; also writer
2014	The Liarist		Short film
2014	Malaysia Airlines Is Super Sorry		Short film
2014	Normal Best Friends Say Bye	Lilan	Short film; also writer
2014	OkCupid's Human Experiments		Short film
2014	Super Heroes vs. Game Heroes	Alyx	Short film
2015	The Worst Year of My Life	Bakery Worker	
2015	Til It Happens to You	Lilan	Short film
2016	Wake Up America!	Sandrea	
2016	Rumble in the Valley	Bone	Short film
2016	Dicky Sledgehammer: The Case of Sunday Stone	Detective Yew	
2017	Mr. Roosevelt	Sunni	
2017	Cavemansplaining	Ava	Short film
2017	The Mad Ones	'Slacksters' Monika	
2017	The Vomit Solution to Thirsty Men	Gal on Street / Dance Club Girl	Short film; also writer and director
2017	Linds	Lindsey	Short film
2018	Seven Stages to Achieve Eternal Bliss	Anthea	
2018	The Odd Essay	Athena	
2018	Good Deed	Susan	
2019	The Roommate	Shreya	Short film
2020	Come Find Me	Allison	Short film

=== Television ===
Year	Title	Role	Notes
2007	Gullible Gil	Jane	4 episodes
2009-2015	UCB Comedy Originals	Various	5 episodes
2011	Zombie Apocalypse	Myra	TV movie
2012	The Silicon Assassin Project	Karina	Episode: "The Wall"
2012	Let It Go	Trisha	TV Pilot
2013	NTSF:SD:SUV::	Penny	Episode: "The Great Train Stoppery"
2013	Days of Our Lives	Hotel Clerk	2 episodes
2013	Hart of Dixie	Collette	Episode: "How Do You Like Me Now?"
2013	Youth Large	Karle Busse	TV Pilot
2014	Conan	Lesbian Zombie	Episode: "The Cast of The Walking Dead/White Denim"
2014	The Pete Holmes Show	Chun-Li	Episode: "Paul Scheer: Interview #2"
2014	Jilted Women Retell Classic Love Stories	Scarlett's Bestie	Episode: "Scarlett and Rhett"
2014	Suburgatory	Monique	Episode: "Catch and Release"
2014	Parks and Recreation	Sam Nut	2 episodes
2014	Futurestates	Employer	Episode: "As You Were"
2014	Geek Cred	Super Fan	Episode: "Nerdrage Against the Machine"
2014	Newsreaders	Question Woman	Episode: "Go Nadz; Talkin' News"
2015	Childrens Hospital	Sauna Staffer	Episode: "Codename: Jennifer"
2015	Highly Evolved Human	Breezy	1 episode
2015	Falling Flat	Karen	TV movie
2015	Life in Pieces	Waitress	Episode: "Hospital Boudoir Time-Out Namaste"
2015	Adam Ruins Everything	Network Lawyer	Episode: "Adam Ruins Security
2015	Adam Ruins Everything	Cool Media Gal	Episode: "Adam Ruins Nutrition"
2015	Filthy Preppy Teens	Darcy Bishop	Main cast
2016	The UCB Show		Episode: "Ghost Trusters"
2016	Dice	Hostess	Episode: "Sal Maldonado"
2016	I Am Watching You	Karen	TV movie
2016	This Isn't Working	Susie	Episode: "A Very Special Episode"
2016	Comedy Bang! Bang!	Camper	Episode: "Gillian Jacobs Wears a Gray Checkered Suit and a Red Bow Tie"
2017	Channel Zero	Survivor	TV movie
2017	Love	Doorperson	Episode: "The Work Party"
2017	Lifeline	Jasmine	2 episodes
2017–2019	Andi Mack	Rebecca "Bex" Mack	Main cast
2018	The Joel McHale Show with Joel McHale	Aashleigh R.	Episode: "Coffee Is Delicious"
2018	The 5th Quarter	Wanda Gotski	Episode: "Field of Screams"
2019	Future Man	Fox	Episode: "Countdown to a Prologue"
2019	Drunk History	Elisa Boyer	Episode: "Legacies"
2019	It's Always Sunny in Philadelphia	Sara	Episode: "A Woman's Right to Chop"
2020	Indebted	Hannah	Episode: "Everybody's Talking About Hot Goss"
TBA	Truck'd Up	Lily	TV movie
2022	Murderville	Amber Kang	6 episodes, 1 special
2022, 2025	NCIS	Robin Knight	3 episodes: S20 E8 "Turkey Trot", S22 E11 "For Better or Worse", S22 E16 "Ladies' Night"
2022	Who Killed Santa? A Murderville Murder Mystery (Note: This is a Murderville Christmas special)	Amber Kang	TV movie
2023–present	Shrinking	Tia	9 episodes

=== Web ===
Year	Title	Role	Notes
2014	Gay of Thrones	Herself	Episode: "The Laws of Gay Men"
2015	CollegeHumor's Comedy Music Hall of Fame	Subway Representative	TV special
2015-2016	CollegeHumor Originals	Various	4 episodes
2019	The Filth	Chloe	2 episodes
