= Trent Garrett =

American actor and model (born 1984)

- Born: March 2, 1984 (age 42); Hampton, Virginia, U.S.
- Occupation: Actor
- Years active: 2009–present
- Spouse: Cassie Steele (m. 2018; div. 2021)
- Children: 1

Trent Garrett (born March 2, 1984) is an American actor best known for his roles as Bowie Quinn on the Disney Channel series Andi Mack, Wes on Splitting Up Together, and John on Maggie.

== Early life ==
Garrett was born on March 2, 1984. He was born and raised in Hampton, Virginia. Garrett was the kicker on the Grafton High School football team.

== Career ==
Garrett's film roles include Austin Banks in Boost, Jason in Pocket Listing, and Larry in Martial Science. His first major television role was as Asher Pike in 91 episodes of All My Children. In 2012, he had a recurring role on the ABC Family series, Make It or Break It, playing Brad, who is training to go to the 2012 Olympics for cycling.

In 2017, he landed the recurring role of Bowie, Andi's father on the Disney Channel's hit show Andi Mack, and in Season 3 he was promoted to a series regular.

In 2018, he joined the cast of the ABC sitcom Splitting Up Together. In 2021, he played the role of Parker Freeman on the TNT drama series Animal Kingdom. In 2022, he played the role of John on the Hulu comedy series Maggie.

== Personal life ==
Garrett has a son from a previous relationship who was born in 2015. He married Canadian actress Cassie Steele in 2018. In December 2020, Garrett filed for divorce from Steele.

== Filmography ==
=== Film ===
Year	Title	Role	Notes
2012	Last Call	Ryan	
2012	Slightly Single in L.A.	Jivers	
2013	Martial Science	Larry	
2015	Pocket Listing	Jason	
2016	Boost	Austin Banks	
2016	Underworld: Blood Wars	Michael Corvin	Replacing Scott Speedman from the first two films
2017	Avenge the Cows: The Legend of Loca	Redding	
2017	Interlude in Prague	Ferdinand	
2018	The Cat Burglar	Bobby Lane	Voice role; Short film
2021	Army of Thieves	Mr. Cool Guy	
2023	Give Me an A	Braden	
2025	A Murder Between Friends	Alec	

=== Television ===
Year	Title	Role	Notes
2009	90210	Bru-Dog	Episode: "The Dionysian Debacle"
2010–2011	All My Children	Asher Pike	91 episodes
2012	Make It or Break It	Brad	2 episodes
2012	Baby Daddy	Gene	Episode: "Something Borrowed, Something Ben"
2012	Rebounding	Sid	Unsold television pilot
2012	CSI: NY	Oliver Epps	Episode: "2,918 Miles"
2016	The Deleted	Eric	3 episodes
2016	Hawaii Five-0	Travis Wilson	Episode: "Ka Luhi"
2016–2018	New Girl	Donovan	3 episodes
2017	The Middle	Chester	Episode: "The Confirmation"
2017	A Man for Every Month	Brock	Television film
2017–2019	Andi Mack	Bowie Quinn	Recurring role; 20 episodes (Seasons 1–2); Main role (Season 3)
2018	Kevin (Probably) Saves the World	Charlie	Episode: "The Ugly Sleep"
2018	Here and Now	Randy	2 episodes
2018	Splitting Up Together	Wes	Recurring role; 5 episodes
2019	Lodge 49	Bobby	Episode: "The Slide"
2021	Animal Kingdom	Parker Freeman	2 episodes
2021	Hanna	Taylor	4 episodes
2022	Maggie	John	2 episodes
2023	Carnival Row	Akos	Episode: "New Dawn"
2023	Not Dead Yet	Ross	Episode: 'Not Dating Yet"
2023	Magnum P.I.	Derek Evans	Episode: "Out of Sight, Out of Mind"
2023	The Four Mothers	Alex	Episode: "Spy"

=== Web ===
Year	Title	Role	Notes
2010	Sweety	Charlie Mack	5 episodes

=== Music videos ===
Year	Title	Artist	Notes
2004	Super Duper Love	Joss Stone	

== Filmmaking credits ==
Year	Title	Producer	Director	Notes
2017	Avenge the Cows: The Legend of Loca	Yes	No	
2022–2023	The Four Mothers	Yes	No	2 episodes
2023	Fear the Fog	Yes	No	Short film
2023	Sandcastles	Yes	No	Short film
2023	Truth of Lies	Yes	No	Short film
2023	Click	Yes	No	Short film
TBA	Murder Between Friends	Yes	Yes	
TBA	A.I. Heart U	Yes	No	
