= Terri Minsky =

American television writer and producer

- Born: August 27, 1957 (age 69)
- Occupations: Television writer, producer
- Notable work: Andi Mack; Finding Carter; Lizzie McGuire
- Children: 2
- Family: Norman Steinberg (uncle)

Terri Minsky (born August 27, 1957) is an American television writer and producer who created The Geena Davis Show, Lizzie McGuire, Less Than Perfect, and Andi Mack.

== Early and personal life ==
Minsky grew up in Mt. Lebanon, Pennsylvania and graduated from Mt. Lebanon High School. A mother of two, Minsky published a reflection, "The Mother Load," on balancing time between her work and family in Literary Mama. Minsky is Jewish.

== Career ==
Minsky was a writer for The Wall Street Journal, The Boston Globe, the New York Daily News, Premiere, New York, and Esquire.

Minsky's first writing credits were for episodes of Doctor Doctor in 1989 and Flying Blind in 1992–1993. Minsky was the executive producer of Sherri, a Lifetime series that ran for one season in 2009. In 2014, Minsky co-wrote the pilot for MTV's Finding Carter, which debuted on July 8, 2014, and was the show's executive producer for its first season.

Minsky created and executive produced the GLAAD Award-winning Disney Channel series, Andi Mack, which began development in 2015, production in 2016, and aired from 2017 to 2019. It was also her second TV series for the Disney Channel following 2001's Lizzie McGuire.

Following the end of Andi Mack, in August 2019, it was announced that Minsky had signed a deal to create future series and films for Disney Channel and the upcoming Disney+ streaming service, as her first project under this deal being a revival of Lizzie McGuire. Minsky exited her role as showrunner of the revival on January 9, 2020, after the first two episodes of the series had been filmed due to creative differences with Disney, and the revival has since been cancelled.

== Filmography ==
| Year | Title | Episodes | Role | Notes |
|---|---|---|---|---|
| 1989-1991 | Doctor Doctor | "Two Angry Men" (1991) ... (written by) "When Bad Books Happen to Good People" (1990) ... (written by) "The Last Temptation of Mike" (1990) ... (written by) "Doctors and Other Strangers" (1990) ... (written by) "Torch Song Cardiology" (1989) ... (written by) "Bachelor Doctor" (1989) ... (written by) | Writer | TV series |
| 1992-1993 | Flying Blind | "Unforgiving" (1993) ... (written by) "The Player" (1993) ... (written by) "Desperately Seeking Alicia" (1992) ... (written by) "Prelude to a Brisket" (1992) ... (written by) (producer - 21 episodes) | Writer, producer | TV series |
| 1995 | Clarissa | N/A | Writer, co-executive producer | TV movie, teleplay |
| 1995-1996 | C.P.W | "You Belong to Me!" (1996) ... (written by) "Mermaids Strike Better" (1996) ... (written by) "Public Execution" (1996) ... (written by) "She Danced Only One Summer" (1995) ... (written by) "The History of Gil and Rachel" (1995) ... (written by) "With the Weapons of a Mrs." (1995) ... (written by) "Intrigues" (1995) ... (written by) | Writer | TV series |
| 1997 | Pearl | "Power Play" (1997) ... (written by) | Writer | TV series |
| 1998-1999 | Sex and the City | "Shortcomings" (1999) ... (written by) "The Baby Shower" (1998) ... (written by) | Writer | TV series |
| 2000-2001 | The Geena Davis Show | (created by - 14 episodes, 2000 - 2001) (creator - 8 episodes, 2000) (writer - 2 episodes, 2000) (executive producer - 7 episodes) | Writer, creator, executive producer | TV series |
| 2001-2002 | Lizzie McGuire | (creator - 62 episodes, 2001–2004) (writer - 2 episodes, 2001–2002) "Pool Party" (2001) ... (executive producer) | Writer, creator, executive producer | TV series |
| 2002-2006 | Less Than Perfect | (creator 66 episodes, 2002–2006) (written by - 4 episodes, 2002–2003) (writer - 1 episode, 2004) (executive producer - 22 episodes) | Writer, creator, executive producer | TV series |
| 2003 | The Lizzie McGuire Movie | N/A | Executive producer | Movie |
| 2005 | What's Stevie Thinking? | (created by, 1 episode, 2005) (creator, 1 episode, 2005) (writer - 1 episode, 2005) (executive producer - 1 episode, 2005) | Writer, creator, executive producer | An unsold television pilot produced for Disney Channel |
| 2008 | Cashmere Mafia | "Yours, Mine and Hers" (2008) ... (written by) "Conference Call" (2008) ... (written by) (consulting producer - 4 episodes, 2008) (co-executive producer - 2 episodes, 2008) | Writer, consulting producer, co-executive producer | TV series |
| 2009 | Sherri | "Indecision '09" (2009) ... (written by) (executive producer - 12 episodes) | Writer, executive producer | TV series |
| 2011 | Rip City | N/A | Writer, executive producer | TV movie |
| 2013 | The Carrie Diaries | "The Second Time Around" (2013) ... (written by) "The Long and Winding Road Not Taken" (2013) ... (written by) "Read Before Use" (2013) ... (written by) (co-executive producer - 12 episodes) | Writer, co-executive producer | TV series |
| 2014 | Finding Carter | (developed by - 36 episodes, 2014–2015) (written by - 2 episodes, 2014) (teleplay - 1 episode, 2014) "Drive" (2014) ... (executive producer) | Writer, executive producer | TV series |
| 2016 | Younger | "Jersey, Sure" (2016) ... (written by) | Writer | TV series |
| 2017 | Andi Mack | (created by - 31 episodes, 2017–2018) (written by - 3 episodes, 2017) (creator - 2 episodes, 2017) (executive producer - 25 episodes) | Writer, creator, executive producer | TV series |
