= List of Childrens Hospital episodes =

Childrens Hospital, a situation comedy television and web series created by Rob Corddry, which premiered its first season online on TheWB.com on December 8, 2008. On July 11, 2010, Adult Swim began airing the web episodes in groups of two. Season two began on Adult Swim on August 22, 2010. Season three began on June 2, 2011. Season four began on August 10, 2012. Season five began on July 26, 2013, season six on March 21, 2015, and the seventh and final season on January 22, 2016.

As of April 15, 2016, 10 webisodes and 86 television episodes of Childrens Hospital have aired.

== Series overview ==
Season	Episodes	Originally released		
Season	Episodes	First released	Last released	Network
Web series	10	December 8, 2008		TheWB.com
1	5	July 11, 2010	August 8, 2010	Adult Swim
2	12	August 22, 2010	November 7, 2010	Adult Swim
3	14	June 2, 2011	September 1, 2011	Adult Swim
4	14	August 9, 2012	November 15, 2012	Adult Swim
5	14	July 25, 2013	October 24, 2013	Adult Swim
6	14	March 20, 2015	June 19, 2015	Adult Swim
7	13	January 22, 2016	April 15, 2016	Adult Swim

== Episodes ==
=== Web series (2008) ===
All ten episodes of the web series debuted on December 8, 2008. Each episode was 4–5 minutes long. The credited cast consisted of Lake Bell, Rob Corddry, Erinn Hayes, Rob Huebel, Ken Marino, and Megan Mullally.

No.	Title	Directed by	Written by	Release date
1	"Episode 1"	Rob Corddry	Rob Corddry	December 8, 2008
When Cat breaks up with Glenn, Lola decides to be supportive and break up with her own boyfriend, Owen, by telling him that she has brain cancer. Guest stars: Nate Corddry, Ed Helms, Dannah Feinglass
2	"Episode 2"	Rob Corddry	Rob Corddry	December 8, 2008
Things get tense after Cat sneezed on Lola. Meanwhile, Briggs tries to get Owen back on the police force. Guest stars: Nick Offerman
3	"Episode 3"	Rob Corddry	Rob Corddry	December 8, 2008
The Chief calls a staff meeting to discuss Lola's nonexistent brain tumor. Guest stars: Nate Corddry, Ed Helms, Nick Offerman
4	"Episode 4"	Rob Corddry	Rob Corddry	December 8, 2008
The Chief tries to help a boy who has aged rapidly. Meanwhile, Blake tries to help people via the healing power of laughter. Guest stars: Nick Kroll, Zandy Hartig
5	"Episode 5"	Rob Corddry	Rob Corddry	December 8, 2008
Another doctor tries to use Blake's method: the healing power of laughter. Guest stars: Jamie Denbo, Brooke Dillman, Brian Huskey (in a different role from his current character, Chet the paramedic), Nick Offerman, Jason Sudeikis, Seth Morris, Kulap Vilaysack
6	"Episode 6"	Rob Corddry	Jonathan Stern	December 8, 2008
In this very special episode, things are told from the perspective of a visiting doctor from Puerto Rico. Guest stars: Cutter Garcia, David Wain, Joe Lo Truglio (voice only)
7	"Episode 7"	Rob Corddry	Rob Corddry	December 8, 2008
Glen gets upset about Cat's new boyfriend. Meanwhile, a new doctor may be able to cure The Chief. Guest stars: John Ross Bowie, Nate Corddry, Jamie Denbo, Zandy Hartig, Ed Helms, Nick Kroll, A.D. Miles, Seth Morris, Jason Sudeikis, Kulap Vilaysack
8	"Episode 8"	Rob Corddry	Rob Corddry	December 8, 2008
Blake challenges Nate to a competition where the two doctors must perform surgery using only the healing power of laughter. Guest stars: John Ross Bowie, Nick Kroll, Seth Morris, A.D. Miles
9	"Episode 9"	Rob Corddry	Rob Corddry	December 8, 2008
Blake tells Lola he knows her brain tumor is fake and asks to use "the healing power of laughter" to cure it, in order to upset his rival clown Dr. Nate Schachter. Meanwhile, Glen tries to get revenge on Cat's new boyfriend, six-year-old boy Little Nicky, by giving him a vasectomy. Dr. Max Von Sydow offers to cure The Chief. Guest stars: John Ross Bowie, Jamie Denbo, Zandy Hartig, Nick Kroll, Nick Offerman, Seth Morris
10	"Episode 10"	Rob Corddry	Rob Corddry	December 8, 2008
In the season finale Max performs surgery on The Chief, after which she resembles Eva Longoria. Blake tries to cure Lola's nonexistent tumor with "the healing power of laughter," accidentally killing her in the process. Blake announces his plans to start his own private practice in a spin-off called, Dr. Blake Downs, M.D. At the funeral, Lola is revealed to have faked her death and attended in disguise. Guest stars: John Ross Bowie, Nate Corddry, Jamie Denbo, Ed Helms, Eva Longoria, Nick Offerman, Kulap Vilaysack

=== Season 1 (2010) ===
The ten web episodes were doubled-up and reformatted as 11 minute TV episodes, which began airing on July 11, 2010. Each TV episode features a parody commercial in between the two webisodes, as well as a message from Corddry at the end. The credited cast consisted of Lake Bell, Rob Corddry, Erinn Hayes, Rob Huebel, Ken Marino, and Megan Mullally.

No. overall	No. in season	Title	Directed by	Written by	Original release date
1	1	"A Hospital Isn't a Place"	Rob Corddry	Rob Corddry	July 11, 2010
Webisodes 1 and 2. Faux commercial for the "Epic 12 Hour Season Finale Event" of TV series NTSF:SD:SUV:: (National Terrorism Strike Force: San Diego: Sports Utility Vehicle). In the post-show message from Rob Corddry, Corddry reminisces about plays he used to put on for his male babysitter. Guest stars: Nate Corddry, Ed Helms, Dannah Feinglass (Webisode 1); Michael Cera (voice only), Nick Offerman (Webisode 2) Paul Scheer, June Diane Raphael, Rob Riggle (NTSF commercial)
2	2	"Monkeys, That's What We Are"	Rob Corddry	Rob Corddry	July 18, 2010
Webisodes 3 and 4. Faux commercial for anti-depressant berry drink, Nutricai, endorsed by Chris Elliott. In the post show-message, Corddry reads an excerpt from the #1 National Best Seller, Hospital of Children by Ryan Berg, upon which the series was based. Guest stars: Nate Corddry, Ed Helms, Nick Offerman (Webisode 3); Nick Kroll, Zandy Hartig (Webisode 4) Chris Elliott (Nutricai commercial)
3	3	"Very Special Episode"	Rob Corddry	Rob Corddry (Webisode 5); Jonathan Stern (Webisode 6)	July 25, 2010
Webisodes 5 and 6. Faux commercial for the "Epic 12 Hour Season Finale Event" of TV series NTSF:SD:SUV (National Terrorism Strike Force: San Diego: Sports Utility Vehicle). In the post show-message, Corddry is with "the real Dr. Blake Downs" and "the real Cutter Spindell" (who is actually David Wain). Guest stars: Nick Offerman, Jason Sudeikis, Seth Morris, Jamie Denbo, Brian Huskey (Webisode 5); Michael Cera (voice only), David Wain, Joe Lo Truglio (voice only), Cutter Garcia (Webisode 6) Paul Scheer, June Diane Raphael, Rob Riggle (NTSF commercial)
4	4	"This Kid's Getting a Vasectomy"	Rob Corddry	Rob Corddry	August 1, 2010
Webisodes 7 and 8. Faux commercial for the "Epic 12 Hour Season Finale Event" of TV series NTSF:SD:SUV (National Terrorism Strike Force: San Diego: Sports Utility Vehicle). In the post-show message from Rob Corddry shares where the idea for Childrens Hospital came from. Guest stars: Ed Helms, Nate Corddry, Nick Kroll, Zandy Hartig, Jason Sudeikis, Seth Morris, Jamie Denbo, A.D. Miles, John Ross Bowie (Webisode 7); Michael Cera (voice only), Nick Kroll, Seth Morris, A.D. Miles, John Ross Bowie (Webisode 8) Paul Scheer, June Diane Raphael, Rob Riggle (NTSF commercial)
5	5	"Nut Cutters?"	Rob Corddry	Rob Corddry	August 8, 2010
Webisodes 9 and 10. Faux commercial for the "Epic 12 Hour Season Finale Event" of TV series NTSF:SD:SUV (National Terrorism Strike Force: San Diego: Sports Utility Vehicle). In the post-show message from Rob Corddry plays some clips of his favorite moments from the web series, which all feature only him. Guest stars: Nick Offerman, Nick Kroll, Zandy Hartig, Seth Morris, Jamie Denbo, John Ross Bowie (Webisode 9); Michael Cera (voice only), Eva Longoria, Ed Helms, Nate Corddry, John Ross Bowie, Nick Offerman (Webisode 10) Paul Scheer, June Diane Raphael, Rob Riggle (NTSF commercial)

=== Season 2 (2010) ===
The second season consists of twelve 11 minute episodes. It debuted on August 22, 2010. The credited cast consists of Lake Bell (episodes 1, 2, and 6 only; uncredited in episode 8 and credited with the guest cast in episode 12), Rob Corddry, Erinn Hayes, Rob Huebel, Ken Marino, and Megan Mullally and newcomers Malin Åkerman and Henry Winkler.

No. overall	No. in season	Title	Directed by	Written by	Original release date	Prod. code
6	1	"I See Her Face Everywhere"	Matt Shakman	Rob Corddry	August 22, 2010	201
Cat struggles to get over Lola's death. Sy Mittleman, the new administrator arrives, and the entire staff instantly hates him, except for The Chief who is in love with him. Glenn discovers the cure for cancer is butterfly semen. Blake Downs is given his own spin-off, Blake Downs, M.D., which is promptly canceled, causing him to decide to return to Childrens Hospital. Guest stars: Nick Kroll, Ed Helms (voice only), Renée Victor, Annalise Basso
7	2	"No One Can Replace Her"	Matt Shakman	Rob Corddry	August 29, 2010	202
Cat goes into labor with Little Nicky's baby. Little Nicky's advanced aging disease causes him to take on the tendencies of an old man as the disease begins to kill him. Lola Spratt returns from the hospital to explain that she faked her death, but everyone believes she is a ghost. Blake Downs returns to the hospital, following the failure of his private practice/spin-off. New doctor Valerie Flame takes over narrating duties on the show for Cat Black when complications occur in the birth of she and Nicky's child. Guest stars: Nick Kroll, Zandy Hartig, David Wain, Matt Besser, Ian Roberts, Matt Walsh, Brian Huskey, Beth Dover, Michael Cera
8	3	"I Am Not Afraid of Any Ghost"	Bryan Gordon	Rob Huebel	September 5, 2010	203
Dr. Maestro asks Dr. Flame to stop his heart so that he can find Dr. Spratt in the spirit world. A creepy EMT wants to show The Chief his "sexy costume." Guest stars: Eva Amurri, Zandy Hartig, John Ross Bowie, Marion Ross, Toby Huss, Brian Huskey, Jamie Denbo
9	4	"Give a Painted Brother a Break"	Rob Schrab	Paul Scheer	September 12, 2010	205
Dr. Blake's clown brother comes to visit and borrows money from Dr. Blake to pay off his gambling debts, while telling him it's for an operation. A mascot from a local theme park starts suspiciously, repeatedly bringing in children with broken arms for treatment. The hospital is turned into a youth hostel, and Sy gets conned by an attractive young foreign girl. Guest stars: Zandy Hartig, Kerri Kenney-Silver, Eddie Pepitone, Paul Scheer, Kevin Sussman, Beth Dover, Angela Sarafyan, John Gemberling
10	5	"Joke Overload"	John Inwood	Jason Mantzoukas	September 19, 2010	207
The staff must choose between saving an old black man and a young white kid. Insult comic Jeffrey Ross brings his child into the O.R., but the staff is more concerned with enjoying his humor than treating his child. Two Star Trek nerds dressed in uniforms (one as a Klingon) visit the hospital. Guest stars: Clark Duke, Zandy Hartig, Ernie Hudson, Adam Scott, Jeffrey Ross, Armen Weitzman, Mark L. Young
11	6	"End of the Middle"	David Wain	Jonathan Stern	September 26, 2010	206
An episode of TV news magazine News Readers covering the filming of the final episode of Childrens Hospital, complete with behind the scenes looks at the show. Cutter Spindell (who portrays Blake Downs on the show within the show) interferes to save the series, convincing protesters that they're saving an actual children's hospital. Guest stars: Mather Zickel, Randy and Jason Sklar, Kate Walsh, Abigail Spencer, Jordan Peele, David Wain
12	7	"Frankfurters, Allman Brothers, Death, Frankfurters"	Rob Schrab	Jonathan Stern	October 3, 2010	204
Ben Hayflick (Kurtwood Smith) from the National Division of Health shows up to intimidate Dr. Richie into keeping his cancer cure a secret. One of Valerie's patients is a young psychic girl (Laura Marano) and the staff uses her to get insurance info from a comatose patient. Dr. Maestro treats a child with a knife in his chest, refusing to believe that the knife is causing the kid's medical problems. Guest stars: Kurtwood Smith, Zandy Hartig, Brian Huskey, Will Sasso, Caroline Aaron, John Cho, Laura Marano, Terrell Ransom, Jr.
13	8	"Hot Enough for You?"	David Wain	Rob Corddry & David Wain	October 10, 2010	208
In a parody of Do the Right Thing, a heat wave plagues the hospital leading to violence and several steamy sexual encounters. Guest stars: Keegan-Michael Key, Kurtwood Smith, Zandy Hartig, Lake Bell (uncredited)
14	9	"The Coffee Machine Paid for Itself?"	Bryan Gordon	Ken Marino & Erica Oyama	October 17, 2010	209
Dr. Richie and Rabbi Jewy McJew Jew (David Wain) compete for Dr. Flame's affections. Briggs, Dr. Maestro's old police partner, pays the hospital a visit and Maestro checks his prostate while the two reminisce about a drug bust. Facing a budget crisis, Sy tries to decide between getting rid of the coffee machine or firing one of the doctors. Guest stars: Zandy Hartig, Nick Offerman, David Wain, José Zúñiga
15	10	"Show Me on Montana"	John Inwood	Diablo Cody, Dana Fox, Liz Meriwether & Lorene Scafaria	October 24, 2010	210
It's Take Your Daughter to Work Day at the hospital and the staff all bring in their children. The Chief brings her 27-year-old daughter (Lizzy Caplan) who she keeps treating like a child. Blake Downs brings his five clown-faced daughters whose singing group he coaches. Dr. Richie's daughter discovers a child patient whose plug has fallen out, but she must wait to re-plug him until after sundown since it is Sabbath and she cannot perform any work. Drs. Flame and Maestro try to convince a hermaphrodite which gender to choose, with each doctor vying for their own gender. Guest stars: Steve Agee, Lizzy Caplan, Armen Weitzman
16	11	"You Know No One Can Hear You, Right?"	Ken Marino	Brian Huskey and Rob Corddry	October 31, 2010	211
Dr. Spratt is asked by a right-wing, pro-life Senator (Ed Begley Jr.) to abort his sixteen-year-old son. Dr. Maestro struggles with a ten-year-old kid who keeps beating him up. Guest stars: Ed Begley, Jr., Rachael Harris, Zandy Hartig
17	12	"The Sultan's Finger: Live"	David Wain	Rob Corddry & Jonathan Stern & David Wain	November 7, 2010	212
In this (fake) live episode, the Childrens Hospital doctors must reattach a sultan's finger to his hand. Since the sultan doesn't want to be treated by Jews or clowns, Blake must decide to remove his clown makeup. However, the sultan's finger goes missing, until it is revealed to be with the Chief because she wanted to use the "royal DNA" in it to be with one of the sultan's assistants. Revelations about Cat Black and Valerie Flame are also revealed. Most of this happens as two of the three cameras used to film this episode "live" crash into each other and break, forcing the crew to use only one camera. Guest stars: Lake Bell, Jon Hamm, Anjul Nigam, Faran Tahir, Iqbal Theba, David Wain, Matt Walsh

=== Season 3 (2011) ===
No. overall	No. in season	Title	Directed by	Written by	Original release date	Prod. code	US viewers (millions)
18	1	"Run, Dr. Lola Spratt, Run"	Rob Schrab	Rob Corddry	June 2, 2011	301	1.54
The Childrens Hospital Crew is called in on a Saturday to rescue a child sinking in quicksand, but Dr. Lola Spratt's return is delayed. Guest stars: Ian Abercrombie, Michael Cera, Lisa Edelstein, Rich Fulcher, Jon Hamm, Zandy Hartig, Brian Huskey
19	2	"Ward 8"	Rob Schrab	Jason Mantzoukas	June 9, 2011	307	1.34
Detective Chance Briggs (Nick Offerman) turns up looking for access to Ward 8, ward of criminally insane children, from Dr. Owen Maestro. Dr. Blake Downs returns to his roots in order to help his old girlfriend Britches (Sarah Silverman). Dr. Glenn Richie, now injured after catching his hand in his own car door, has a fling with The Chief. Guest stars: Zachary Gordon, Zandy Hartig, Nick Offerman, Sarah Silverman
20	3	"The Black Doctor"	Steve Pink	Rob Corddry	June 16, 2011	302	1.66
Dr. Blake Downs' new landlord kicks him out for being a clown, so he needs a place to stay. Meanwhile, Dr. Brian (Jordan Peele) returns to Childrens Hospital after leaving his job as a consultant on the medical drama "Black Hospital." Also, Dr. Valerie Flame is attracted to a naked Dr. Cat Black. Guest stars: Jordan Peele, Matthew Perry, Marlon Wayans, Brandon Johnson, Kym Whitley
21	4	"Home Is Where the Hospital Is"	Michael Patrick Jann	Erica Oyama	June 23, 2011	311	1.78
When the group realizes space is limited in their apartment, they resort to having to kick someone out, and Glenn and Lola want to tell the group about their relationship. Meanwhile, Sy has been forced to live in an out-of-order restroom at the hospital. In the end, Glenn and Lola announce their relationship, and decide to move into a room together, solving the space problem in the apartment, while Sy is left hanging after almost getting to stay with the group. Guest stars: Zandy Hartig, Nick Offerman, Jordan Peele, Lindsay Sloane, Thomas Lennon
22	5	"Nip/Tug"	Dylan Kidd	Brian Huskey	June 30, 2011	304	1.59
A new plastic surgeon named Tugg makes Owen and Glenn jealous and eager to get rid of him, until he could possibly solve a mix-up in the maternity ward (where parents are getting the wrong babies). Eventually, Tugg has to leave after taking the blame for the mix-up. Meanwhile, Blake confronts Valerie about her raping of him the previous year, but she just puts him down. Guest stars: Zandy Hartig, Sarah Hyland, Seth Morris, John Ross Bowie
23	6	"The '70s Episode"	Steve Pink	Rob Corddry	July 7, 2011	306	1.40
It's the "Lost Episode" from 1976. Glenn returns from the Vietnam War to be an abortionist. Lola becomes a female doctor and gets no respect. Americans value their hot dogs. Disco! Guest stars: Raphael Bob-Waksberg, Colton Dunn, Jordan Peele, Mike Starr, Morgan Walsh
24	7	"Father's Day"	Tristram Shapeero	Jonathan Stern	July 14, 2011	308	1.59
Lola and Brian try to reunite Cat with her father. Blake waits for a criminal to be executed so that he can cut out his heart and bring it to the hospital before a minor turns 18, at which point Childrens can no longer treat them. Sy runs a urine drive. Guest stars: Paul Ben-Victor, Richard Brooks, Zandy Hartig, Jordan Peele, Jesse Plemons, Sarah Thyre
25	8	"Stryker Bites the Dust"	Dylan Kidd	Rob Huebel & Paul Scheer	July 21, 2011	313	1.38
After a beloved doctor passes away, Sy treats all the doctors to therapy sessions and forbids them from doing any work until they're well again. Meanwhile, Blake deals with the controversy of circus clowns versus city clowns, and the Chief struggles with her strange new hearing aid. Guest stars: Jordan Peele, Rob Riggle, Scott Aukerman, Matt Besser, Lennon Parham, Ian Roberts
26	9	"Childrens Hospital: A Play in Three Acts"	Michael Patrick Jann	Rob Corddry & Jonathan Stern & David Wain	July 28, 2011	314	N/A
Childrens Hospital presents a very special episode that will take you back to simpler times, when ladies wore dresses, men wore top hats and clowns knew their place. Guest stars: Bruce Davison, Kulap Vilaysack
27	10	"Munch by Proxy"	Tristram Shapeero	Rob Corddry	August 4, 2011	305	N/A
Owen shocks everyone when his secret wife (who doesn't believe he's actually a doctor) brings their injured baby daughter to the hospital for treatment. The Chief is horrified by this news, not least because it may lead to her attending a wedding with Chet the paramedic. And Valerie Flame finds herself playing a very high-stakes chess game against a man who could be the Grim Reaper. Guest stars: Holley Fain, Brian Huskey, Michael McKean, Alicia Silverstone
28	11	"The Night Shift"	Rob Schrab	Jason Mantzoukas	August 11, 2011	309	1.63
Frustration abounds at the hospital when the doctors are assigned to work the night shift where they learn the ropes from a European doctor that has joined the team, and tragedy strikes at the hospital when a doctor faces death. Guest stars: Nick Kroll, Paul Scheer, Joanna Angel, Raven Alexis, Jesse Falcon, Brody Stevens
29	12	"The Chet Episode"	Tristram Shapeero	Seth Morris	August 18, 2011	310	1.66
The episode focuses on Chet the paramedic and fellow paramedic Shane who gives Chet advice on asking Chief out, even causing Chet to believe he is a woman due to Shane's smooth talking. However, as the episode progresses, Chet begins to question if Shane is real or imaginary after Shane seemingly disappears after giving advice and when things go wrong. Guest stars: Brian Huskey, Joe Lo Truglio, Jordan Peele, Lauren Weedman
30	13	"Party Down"	Rob Schrab	Rob Schrab	August 25, 2011	312	1.61
A food poisoning incident at a bar mitzvah brings in a large group of patients, prompting Dr Ritchie to have an adult bar mitzvah to make up for his own being cancelled when he was young. Rabbi McJewjew comes by to help out and re-kindles his affair with Valerie. Owen decides to have his foreskin re-attached when Chief mentions that women prefer it because it's more 'masculine'. When his father tells him he hasn't got his foreskin, Owen tries to fool Chief into attaching a piece of balogna only to be stopped just in time by his father (a tailor) who reveals he was never circumcised—just hemmed. Meanwhile, it's Blake's day off. After the credits there is a short appearance by the cast of Party Down including Ken Marino and Megan Mullally in character. Guest stars: David Wain, Lizzy Caplan, Ryan Hansen, Stephen Root, Martin Starr, Kulap Vilaysack
31	14	"Newsreaders"	Rob Schrab	Jonathan Stern	September 1, 2011	303	1.45
It's the second Newsreaders special with Louis LaFonda. In this special, all those sexy actors get their very own spinoff specials. Guest stars: Ike Barinholtz, Jason Mantzoukas, Mather Zickel

=== Season 4 (2012) ===
No. overall	No. in season	Title	Directed by	Written by	Original release date	Prod. code	US viewers (millions)
32	1	"The Boy with the Pancakes Tattoo"	Lake Bell	Ken Marino & Erica Oyama	August 9, 2012	411	1.64
In this episode, which satirizes Contagion, and whose title satirizes The Girl with the Dragon Tattoo, everyone at Childrens Hospital gets amnesia. After that, it looks as though the only way to get rid of the amnesia is to give the amnesia... amnesia. Guest stars: Sean Eaton, Jason Ellis, Zandy Hartig, Gregory Scott Hicks
33	2	"Staff Dance"	Steve Pink	Jonathan Stern	August 16, 2012	409	1.73
Madonna visits the hospital, stunning Owen. Guest stars: James Adomian, Kathryn Burns, Zandy Hartig, Brian Huskey
34	3	"Chief's Origin"	Steve Pink	Rob Corddry	August 23, 2012	410	1.68
Chief recounts her past, but the doctors aren't interested in her tale. Guest stars: Abigail Spencer, Nick Offerman, Erich Bergen, Tom Virtue
35	4	"Free Day"	Rob Schrab	Ken Marino & Erica Oyama	August 30, 2012	401	1.57
Sy assigns the staff to organize the patients' records while he is out of the hospital. However, with his absence, the staff consider it as a free day. Guest stars: Beth Dover, Zandy Hartig, Brian Huskey, Lauri Johnson
36	5	"Behind the Scenes"	Michael Patrick Jann	David Wain	September 6, 2012	406	N/A
While filming an episode of Childrens Hospital, Lynn Williams and Dixie Peters have a romantic rivalry over the director, David Wain, who has divorced the former and married the latter. Meanwhile, Rob Heubel tries to hide his medical condition from the show's crew in order to keep his job with the help of Cutter Spindell. Guest stars: Timothy Busfield, Marston Fobbs, Zandy Hartig, Dele Ogundiran, Josh Sussman, David Wain, Jennifer Westfeldt
37	6	"The Return of the Young Billionaire"	Rob Schrab	Rob Huebel	September 13, 2012	402	1.61
Owen works with a detective to get to the bottom of strange behavior by kids. A young billionaire doggedly courts an uninterested Lola Spratt. Guest stars: Beth Dover, Michael Grant, Nikki Hahn, Zandy Hartig, Michaela Watkins
38	7	"British Hospital"	Tristram Shapeero	Sam Bain	September 20, 2012	408	1.44
A look at the British version of "Childrens Hospital". Guest stars: (For this episode, the following are given star billing in place of the original cast, who are all absent in this episode): Lauren Cohan, Frank Ferrante, Frances Fisher, Sasha Jackson, Dominic Monaghan, Jaime Murray, Jim Piddock, Dileep Rao Other guest stars: Rosalind Ayres, Neil Dale, Rebecca Jane Reid, Peter Serafinowicz (voice only)
39	8	"Ladies Night"	David Wain	Ken Marino & Erica Oyama	September 27, 2012	403	1.42
A promotion for single moms catches the male doctors' attention. Guest stars: Tobin Carter, Barrow Davis, Zandy Hartig, Christina Pickles, Kelly Ryan, Leslie Thurston, Janet Varney, Anna Vocino
40	9	"A Kid Walks in to a Hospital"	Lake Bell	Rob Corddry & Jonathan Stern	October 4, 2012	412	1.35
Sy's spy past comes back to haunt him when his former partner returns to kill him. Guest stars: Paxton Anderson, Beth Dover, Zandy Hartig, Brian Huskey, Tara Macken, Abigail Spencer
41	10	"A Year in the Life"	David Wain	David Wain	October 18, 2012	404	1.55
The events of a full year at the hospital are chronicled, as Sy struggles to turn the hospital's fortunes around, Owen relentlessly hits on Lola, and the Simon Wiesenthal Center tracks Joseph Mengele. Guest stars: Beth Dover, Philip Baker Hall, Zandy Hartig, Tina Huang, Kulap Vilaysack Note: This is the first episode to be rated TV-MA.
42	11	"Attention Staff"	Ken Marino	Rob Corddry	October 25, 2012	413	1.45
The identity of the mysterious public announcement announcer is finally revealed when Blake and Owen look around the corners of the hospital. Meanwhile, Sy tries to warn Sal Viscuso, the PA announcer, but instead sees the ghost of Arthur Childrens. When Blake finally sees Sal, a young boy who has not died, but rather has just not aged since he was experimented on, he chases after him but is outrun by him. "A friend" tells Blake that he won't be able to catch Sal. All this happens while Chief stays in the door, doing nothing but talking. Guest stars: Jon Hamm, Zandy Hartig, Michael Andrew Stock, Michael Cera
43	12	"Childrens Lawspital"	Ken Marino	Jason Mantzoukas	November 1, 2012	414	1.68
Lola has no friends or pets so she gets a law degree and defends Owen, who is charged with murdering a patient by slapping him during surgery. Guest stars: Nate Corddry, Gabriel Sean Elias, Kathryn Hahn, Mark Sarian, Reginald VelJohnson
44	13	"Wisedocs"	Michael Patrick Jann	Rob Corddry	November 8, 2012	407	N/A
Sy succumbs to pressure and allows a wounded Mafia kingpin to be admitted. Detective Briggs changes vocations. Chief has a day off. Guest stars: David Krumholtz, Joey Diaz, Eddie Mekka, Nick Offerman, Michael Cera
45	14	"Eulogy"	Michael Patrick Jann	Jonathan Stern	November 15, 2012	405	1.54
An episode of Newsreaders takes a look at the death of a cast member. Guest stars: Mather Zickel, David Wain, Kevin Pollak

=== Season 5 (2013) ===
No. overall	No. in season	Title	Directed by	Written by	Original release date	Prod. code	US viewers (millions)
46	1	"A New Hope"	Michael Blieden	Rob Corddry	July 25, 2013	501	1.34
Blake comes back from the dead. Meanwhile, the hospital staff relocates to a U.S. Army base in Japan. Guest stars: Keegan-Michael Key, Steve Agee, Jon Hamm
47	2	"Triangles"	Lake Bell	Michael Showalter	August 1, 2013	502	1.63
Blake's son Willy witnesses a murder and it's up to detective Chance Briggs to save the day and also have a lot of sex. Guest stars: Nick Offerman, Jaleel White, François Chau, James Lew
48	3	"The C-Word"	David Wain	Diablo Cody	August 8, 2013	513	1.39
A plane crash interrupts an evening of fun on the base. Owen tangles with a time loop. Guest stars: Christina Kirk, Alice Lo, Logan Miller, James Adomian
49	4	"Country Weekend"	Ken Marino	David Wain	August 15, 2013	510	1.53
Cat and Michael's wedding weekend at a vacation house sees the doctors and their partners entwined in a murder mystery which Owen must solve. Guest stars: Judah Friedlander, Carla Gallo, Richard Kind, Justin Kirk, "Weird Al" Yankovic
50	5	"Imaginary Friends"	Michael Blieden	Jason Mantzoukas	August 22, 2013	506	1.22
Owen and Dr. Santa Claus have to save a ward full of sick imaginary friends from closure. Cat wants to become a mother. Guest stars: Sean Conroy, Brian Doyle-Murray, Alexa Havins, Jay Johnston, Andrew Pifko, Cole Sand, Andrew Santino, Brian Huskey
51	6	"The Gang Gets Sushi"	David Wain	Jonathan Stern & David Wain & M. Charles Willems	August 29, 2013	504	1.33
Lola's spot-on impersonations get her assigned to a government task force as an old love interest complicates matters. Guest stars: Jordan Peele, Nina Franoszek, Wolf Muser
52	7	"Old Fashioned Day"	Timothy Busfield	Michael Showalter	September 5, 2013	509	1.17
It's Old Fashioned Day at Childrens Hospital. And it lasts longer than a day, which allows for a conflict. Guest stars: Laura Chinn, Beth Dover, Carter Hastings, Tim Neenan, James Urbaniak, Steven Weber
53	8	"Spoiler Alert: Owen Gets a Perm"	Lake Bell	Jonathan Stern	September 12, 2013	507	1.64
Owen gets a perm, so Chief and Kat have to trick him into one of Chet's immersive Halloween mazes. Glenn's mouse Chilli dies. Blake doesn't understand modern idiomatic expressions. Guest star: Michael Winslow
54	9	"Wine Tasting"	Timothy Busfield	David Wain and Laura Chinn	September 19, 2013	505	1.20
Sy arranges a wine tasting at the hospital for Valerie and Chief, while Owen poses as Glenn thanks to an unconventional plan. But what will hospital reviewer Levon Bainter think of all this? Guest stars: William Atherton, Beth Dover
55	10	"Blaken"	Michael Blieden	Rob Huebel	October 3, 2013	503	1.29
Blake is kidnapped, while Owen and Sy struggle to keep Paging Doctor Maestro on the air. Chief is homesick and steals the mail. Guest stars: Jessica Chaffin
56	11	"A Lot of Brouhaha Over Zilch"	Ken Marino	Rob Corddry	October 10, 2013	512	1.29
Derrick Childrens plots to wrest control of the hospital from Sy. A parody of Shakespeare plays. Guest stars: John Gemberling, Jon Hamm, Ian Roberts, David Wain
57	12	"My Friend Falcon"	Michael Blieden	Jonathan Stern	October 17, 2013	511	1.39
Childrens Hospital director David Wain shoots a documentary about his relationship with cast member Just Falcon. Guest stars: Kerri Kenney-Silver, Sam Trammell, David Wain
58–59	13–14	"Coming and Going"	Daniel Kwan; Daniel Scheinert	Rob Corddry & Jonathan Stern & David Wain	October 24, 2013	514	1.51
The doctors' stay in Japan comes to a head in a double-episode season finale. Guest stars: Jack McBrayer, David Wain, Michael Cera Note: This is the second and last episode to be rated TV-MA for strong crude language (L).

=== Season 6 (2015) ===
After leaving Japan, the doctors are ready to return to Brazil.

No. overall	No. in season	Title	Directed by	Written by	Original release date	US viewers (millions)
60	1	"Five Years Later"	Marco Fargnoli	Rob Corddry	March 20, 2015	0.99
Owen returns to Childrens Hospital after serving a five year prison sentence. He had previously been arrested for betting on his surgeries. Now he's back and ready to redeem himself. Only, to his dismay, Chief forces him to continue betting on surgeries. Realizing the Chief just got her finger sharpened, Owen has to decide between a life of crime and a death by sharp finger. Guest stars: Zandy Hartig, Keegan-Michael Key, Chris Parnell
61	2	"Codename: Jennifer"	Alex Fernie	Sam Sklaver	March 27, 2015	0.95
Master of a thousand faces Lola Spratt must go on a top secret mission involving the President's bastard child. Meanwhile, Owen and Blake make some jokes and break some laws. Guest stars: Jordan Peele, Beth Dover, Zandy Hartig, Daniel Riordan, Ronny Cox, Julie Bowen
62	3	"We Are Not Our DNA!"	Alex Fernie	Michael Colton & John Aboud	April 3, 2015	0.97
A geneticist named Gene analyzes the staff's DNA, revealing that Valerie and Blake are siblings, Chet is going to die, Nurse Dori is a sociopath, and Sy is actually astronaut Neil Armstrong. Guest stars: Zandy Hartig, Brian Huskey, Joshua Malina
63	4	"Fan Fiction"	Marco Fargnoli	Megan Amram	April 10, 2015	1.26
The winner of a Childrens Hospital fan fiction contest writes an episode for the series, titled "The Lovers, the Fighters, the Heroes, or: Who Cured the Doctor but the Moon and Blood?", which focuses on Nurse Beth and reveals Owen to be a vampire. Guest stars: Liz Cackowski, Beth Dover, Nick Offerman, David Wain
64	5	"With Great Power..."	Tristram Shapeero	Jonathan Stern	April 17, 2015	1.44
Lola has a superpower: she can pout. Only, when a merciless villain with the power of blindness threatens to use his blinding talents to defeat Lola, it seems all hope is lost. It's pouting versus blindness, and only one superpower can win. Guest stars: Richard Benjamin, Max Charles, Zandy Hartig, Brian Huskey, Fred Melamed, David Wain
65	6	"Just Like Cyrano De Bergerac"	Lake Bell	Michael Colton & John Aboud	April 24, 2015	1.22
Glenn talks Blake through a romance, a la Cyrano de Bergerac. Guest stars: James Adomian, Christina Chang, Nick Offerman, Jordan Peele, Paul Scheer, Lindsay Sloane, Cheryl Tiegs, David Wain
66	7	"Up at 5"	Paul Scheer	Rachel Axler	May 1, 2015	1.36
The cast of Childrens Hospital appears on a morning talk show to promote crowdfunding for a Childrens Hospital movie. Guest stars: Constance Wu, Bil Dwyer, David Wain, Mike McCafferty, Ravi Patel; cameo by "Weird Al" Yankovic
67	8	"Koontz Is Coming"	Ken Marino	Rob Corddry	May 8, 2015	1.42
Sy tries to woo an anonymous blogger. The hospital prepares for a fundraiser headlined by Dean Koontz. Guest stars: Tucker Albrizzi, Beth Dover, Zandy Hartig, Patrick Tunney
68	9	"Sperm Bank Heist"	David Wain	Michael Colton & John Aboud	May 15, 2015	1.09
Sy opens a sperm bank. Valerie plans an elaborate heist. Glenn punches a few people. Lola dresses up. Guest stars: Alex Duong, Nathan Fielder
69	10	"Nils Vildervaan, Professional Interventiomalist"	Tristram Shapeero	Michael Showalter	May 22, 2015	1.46
Sy's relationship with his new girlfriend Rhonda is cramping the other doctors' style. Blake and Nurse Dori track down a loose cat. Guest stars: Michael Showalter, Stephnie Weir
70	11	"Me, Owen"	Ken Marino	Jonathan Stern	May 29, 2015	1.274
When a hospital worker is found beheaded, it seems to be a copycat killing of a fifteen-year-old case, which leads to Owen teaming with his old police partner Chance Briggs to find out what's really going on. Guest stars: Nick Offerman, Tony Hale, Tom Fox, Brian Huskey
71	12	"27 Club"	Lake Bell	Sam Sklaver	June 5, 2015	1.285
Chief enjoys a staycation at the hospital. Blake tries to fit in with Owen's bicycling crew. Glenn is dubbed a rock star surgeon by the media, but worries that his impending 27th birthday will lead to his death. Guest stars: Jonathan Brooks, Beth Dover, Robert Forster, Zandy Hartig, Brian Huskey
72	13	"Home Life of a Doctor"	David Wain	Rachel Axler	June 12, 2015	1.193
Glenn has his weekly Shabbat dinner with his family in the Jewish suburbs of São Paulo. Guest stars: Jamie Denbo, Ben Feldman, Zandy Hartig, Mimi Kennedy, Lindsey Kraft, Michael Lerner, Seth Morris, David Wain
73	14	"Kick Me"	Paul Scheer	Rob Corddry	June 19, 2015	1.163
Blake gets revenge on the gang for their relentless pranks. Guest star: Rachel Blanchard

=== Season 7 (2016) ===
No. overall	No. in season	Title	Directed by	Written by	Original release date	US viewers (millions)
74	1	"Kids Hospital"	Alex Fernie	Rob Corddry	January 22, 2016	1.178
After being fired, the doctors find new jobs at a crosstown hospital; Blake turns to a life of crime. Guest stars: Betsy Brandt, Hannibal Buress, Paul Scheer
75	2	"One Million Saved"	David Wain	Krister Johnson	January 29, 2016	1.020
When a rare disease appears, the team must journey into the original Childrens Hospital to find the cure; the doctors try to save the hospital's millionth patient. Guest star: Jon Hamm
76	3	"Sy's Tenure"	Alex Fernie	Jim Margolis	February 5, 2016	1.127
When Sy gets tenure, he wants to use his influence to build a consumer jetpack; Chief is stranded on a dance pedestal; Owen learns how hard it is to be hospital DJ.
77	4	"Doctor Beth"	David Wain	Krister Johnson	February 12, 2016	1.186
Nurse Beth's origins in the Childrens Hospital basement, where she must navigate the social hierarchy of the nurses. Guest Stars: Marla Gibbs, Samm Levine
78	5	"The Show You Watch"	Marco Fargnoli	Megan Amram	February 19, 2016	1.153
A variety show from the 1950s, The Show You Watch, is revered for its weekly visit to Childrens Hospital. Guest Star: Toby Huss
79	6	"DOY"	Alex Fernie	Megan Amram	February 26, 2016	1.188
Blake, Lola and Glenn are excited to attend the Doctor of the Year Convention in Las Vegas; Owen visits his mother. Guest Star: JoBeth Williams
80	7	"Show Me A Hero"	Ryan McFaul	Krister Johnson	March 4, 2016	1.205
Dr. Cat Black has a crisis of faith, spurring the spiritual leaders to compete for her conversion; Glenn wants more respect. Guest Stars: Jason Antoon, Tom Arnold, Dick Cavett, Randall Park, X
81	8	"By the Throat"	Marco Fargnoli	Krister Johnson	March 11, 2016	1.260
When the hospital runs out of tongue depressors, Owen finds himself tangled in a hospital-wide conspiracy. Guest Star: George Wendt
82	9	"Childrens Horsepital"	Danny Jelinek	Jonathan Stern	March 18, 2016	1.121
Chief hides a race horse at the hospital; Lola's college barbershop quartet tries to convince her to rejoin; Glenn glues Blake's hands in his gloves. Guest Stars: Valerie Harper, Will Sasso
83	10	"Through the Eyes of a Falcon"	Ryan McFaul	Jonathan Stern	March 25, 2016	1.171
Just Falcon, who plays Dr. Glenn Richie, invites the cast to his photography exhibition, where their secrets are revealed. Guest star: Molly Shannon
84	11	"Grandparents Day"	Alex Fernie	Gil Ozeri	April 1, 2016	1.066
The hospital celebrates Bring Your Grandparents to Work Day; the doctors struggle with their relatives. Guest stars: Barry Bostwick, Paul Dooley, Shirley Jones
85	12	"Hump Cola"	Danny Jelinek	Michael Showalter	April 8, 2016	1.411
Owen discovers that the fluid in Chief's hump tastes like Coca-Cola; Blake suspects that Glenn is fighting an addiction. Guest stars: Michael Showalter
86	13	"The Grid"	Danny Jelinek	Rob Corddry	April 15, 2016	1.053
When Glenn and Owen have bizarre hallucinations, and Lola fears she is being pursued, the doctors believe a gas leak is responsible. Guest stars: Anne-Marie Johnson
