= Childrens Hospital =

American black comedy television series

- Also known as: Children's Hospital
- Genre: Sitcom; Parody; Satire; Black comedy
- Created by: Rob Corddry
- Developed by: Rob Corddry; Jonathan Stern; David Wain
- Starring: Lake Bell; Rob Corddry; Erinn Hayes; Rob Huebel; Ken Marino; Megan Mullally; Henry Winkler; Malin Åkerman; Zandy Hartig; Brian Huskey
- Narrated by: Lake Bell; Malin Åkerman; Erinn Hayes
- Theme music composer: Amy Miles
- Composer: Matt Novack
- Country of origin: United States
- Original language: English
- No. of seasons: 7
- No. of episodes: 86 (list of episodes)

Production
- Executive producers: Rob Corddry; Jonathan Stern; David Wain
- Running time: 11 minutes
- Production companies: The Corddry Company; Abominable Pictures; Warner Bros. Studio 2.0; Warner Bros. Television; Williams Street

Original release
- Network: TheWB.com; Adult Swim
- Release: July 11, 2010 – April 15, 2016

Related
- NTSF:SD:SUV:: Newsreaders; Medical Police

Childrens Hospital (originally titled Children's Hospital as webisodes) is an American dark comedy web and television series created by Rob Corddry for Cartoon Network's nighttime programming block Adult Swim. The series began as a web series on TheWB.com with ten episodes, roughly five minutes in length, all of which premiered on December 8, 2008. The series ran for seven seasons from July 11, 2010 to April 15, 2016.

The series serves as a parody of medical drama television series, mocking genre conventions with surreal humor. Corddry is part of an ensemble cast portraying the titular hospital's doctors, which also includes Lake Bell, Erinn Hayes, Rob Huebel, Ken Marino and Megan Mullally. Henry Winkler and Malin Åkerman joined the cast starting with the second season as a hospital administrator and a doctor, respectively. Zandy Hartig and Brian Huskey recurred throughout the show's run, eventually joining the main cast for the fifth season.

== Synopsis ==
Childrens Hospital centers on the staff of the titular hospital, a children's hospital named after Dr. Arthur Childrens. The hospital sporadically (and usually without reason) is mentioned as being located within Brazil despite making virtually no effort to conceal that the series is shot in Los Angeles, California, except for the fifth season, which was set at an American military base in Japan. Its webisodes are about 10–12 minutes long, each narrated by mainly Dr. Cat Black (Lake Bell) in Season 1, and by Dr. Valerie Flame (Malin Åkerman) in Season 2.

== Broadcast ==
Though Comedy Central made a competing offer, the show was picked up by Adult Swim after Corddry decided the comedy style was not suited for the half-hour format Comedy Central wanted. Adult Swim offered half-hour or fifteen-minute time slots, and Corddry chose the latter. The original season one webisodes began airing on Adult Swim on July 11, 2010, in groups of two with a new faux-commercial in between the groupings of two webisodes. The channel then debuted the newly produced season two episodes which began airing on August 22, 2010.

On September 1, 2010, Childrens Hospital began airing on the Canadian television channel G4. In Winter 2013, the show was picked up by Much. In Australia Childrens Hospital premiered on cable on Comedy Channel on January 26, 2011, and on ABC's free-to-air channel ABC2 during May–June 2013. The series began airing repeats on American cable channel TBS beginning October 20, 2014.

== Cast and characters ==
The series revolves around the medical staff of Childrens Hospital, featuring an ensemble cast.

These actors receive top billing in the credits:

- Dr. Blake Downs (Rob Corddry) – doctor who does his job while wearing clown make-up and surgical scrubs painted red to appear bloody. He believes in "the healing power of laughter" instead of medicine. The character's outlook on medicine seems to parody Robin Williams's character in the film Patch Adams. His frightening clown makeup, very similar to the style of serial killer John Wayne Gacy's "Pogo the Clown", often scares the child patients. His status as a clown is frequently likened to a race, and one episode implies that his original name was "Mr. Bojiggles". The character is brutally killed at the end of season 4, but revived at the beginning of season 5; the hospital has a series of cloned clown doctors who are taught Blake Downs's history, so that when one dies, another is activated.
- Dr. Catholomule "Cat" Black (Lake Bell) – ex-girlfriend of Glenn Richie, who has a thing for her roommate Lola Spratt. Things became awkward between the women after Cat accidentally sneezed on Lola when making a sexual advance on her. She narrated the show during season 1, usually wandering through the hospital, thinking faux-deep thoughts like the characters on Scrubs and Grey's Anatomy. Cat begins dating Little Nicky (Nick Kroll), a six-year-old boy with advanced aging disease; and she dies giving birth to his child, who also has advanced aging disease. In "The Sultan's Finger," however, it is revealed she didn't die, but somehow lost all her previous medical knowledge. She then regains it and rejoins the main cast beginning with season 3. She briefly takes up nudism at home in "The Black Doctor". In spite of her "thing" with Lola, she rejects Chief's advances in "Ladies' Night". In one episode she reveals that she grew up in Senegal.
- Dr. Glenn Richie (Ken Marino) – a Jewish doctor and ex-boyfriend of Cat Black. He frequently wears a yarmulke but because of his parents' divorce he never had his bar mitzvah until the episode "Party Down". Dr. Richie is the "playboy" of the hospital, having made out with most of the characters except Sy and Blake. Dr. Richie first appeared in The Ten, which also starred Corddry and was directed by producer David Wain. Sal Viscuso's first PA announcement on the show is a reference to this.
- Dr. Owen Maestro (Rob Huebel) – a dim-witted doctor and Lola Spratt's ex-boyfriend. He is a former New York cop who left the force after 9/11. His former police partner Briggs (Nick Offerman) is constantly trying to convince him to come back to the force.
- Chief (Megan Mullally) – the disabled head of the hospital's staff who initially uses crutches to allow her to walk, before switching to a walker in the Season 2 premiere. The male staff members at the hospital often make remarks about their sexual attraction to her. In spite of her Choctaw Indian heritage, her name came from the fact that her mother saw it in a Scrabble board and chose it over "whore". She is a parody of Dr. Kerry Weaver of ER and Dr. Gregory House from House. She had a crush on Sy Mittleman but she publicly acts like she hates him so that the staff thinks she's on their side in the struggle against him; they finally get together in the episode "Hot Enough For You?" but no reference has been made to this ever since. In a Season 2 episode, Lizzy Caplan plays The Chief's daughter, who has her own real estate business. In one of the original webisodes, the doctors heal her crippling illness and she is inexplicably transformed into a younger, more beautiful woman (portrayed by Eva Longoria). In a Season 7 episode, she is addressed as "Chief Rosenberg".
- Dr. Lola Adolf Spratt (Erinn Hayes) – Cat's roommate and Owen Maestro's ex-girlfriend. Cat is obsessed with her. Lola broke up with Owen by pretending she had a tumor, but he began to believe she was serious. Lola faked her death at the end of season 1 because she broke down after getting too many e-mails. She reappears at the hospital in season 2, but no one understands when she explains she faked her death and they all think she is a ghost. When she finally proves she's not a ghost, she reveals she's a gifted ventriloquist, having pretended to die on the operating table by using a long hum simulating a flat-line sound. She is also an attorney since she had "no pets, no friends, no TV" and passed the bar exam the previous summer, as mentioned in "Childrens Lawspital". She narrated the show in its third season. As she revealed in season 2 episode 9, she is a Muslim.
- Dr. Valerie Flame (Malin Åkerman) – (Season 2–7), replaces Cat after her death in the second episode of season 2, taking over the duties of narrating the show until the third-season premiere, when she is replaced by Lola Spratt. Her secret identity is that of Derrick Childrens (Jon Hamm). She has a "love-to-hate" relationship with Blake, raping him in "Hot Enough For You?" and punching him several times in "A Kid Walks into the Hospital" when she declares her love for him by "doing really weird things" to his mind. She was attracted to Cat when she took up nudism in "The Black Doctor" and was briefly the love interest of Dr. Brian.
- Sy Mittleman (Henry Winkler) – (Season 2–7), is the administrator. He runs the insurance company that owns the hospital. He collects butterflies and seems to have a sexual obsession with them. He is the object of much scorn from the staff who dismiss him as "a suit" despite the fact he genuinely cares for the patients and the hospital. Mittleman frequently has to resist The Chief's come-ons. He is happily married with children and has no desire to begin a sexual relationship with her, but he eventually gives in to her advances in the episode "Hot Enough for You?", although this has never been mentioned since. He was an assassin whose daughter tried and failed to kill him in "A Kid Walks into a Hospital".
- Nurse Dori (Zandy Hartig) – (Season 5; recurring seasons 1–4 and 6–7), Nicky's mother, who does not approve of Cat's relationship with her son. After Little Nicky's death she becomes a nurse at Childrens. She was pregnant in season 3 with the father of the child being unknown until "A Year in the Life" when it was revealed to be Blake (in season 4, Nurse Dori's pregnancy stomach also disappeared).
- Chet Mandvanteussen (Brian Huskey) – (Season 5; recurring, seasons 1–4 and 6–7), the creepy paramedic who has a crush on Chief.

=== Recurring ===
- Sal Viscuso (voiced by Michael Cera) – The hospital staffer who speaks over the intercom. He usually speaks only a few lines per credited episode, typically a non sequitur to the plot. The character name—and in fact the bit itself—is a homage to the actor Sal Viscuso, who voiced the unseen P.A. announcer in the TV series M*A*S*H. Cera eventually appears in the episode "Attention Staff" as a young boy whose aging process has stopped (credited as "A Friend"). In this same episode, Michael Andrew Stock briefly appears as Viscuso, though still voiced by Cera.
- Nurse Beth (Beth Dover) – (season 2; season 4–7); a nurse at the hospital, a wide-eyed ingénue who is the subject of viewer fan fiction.
- Officer Chance Briggs (Nick Offerman) – Owen Maestro's former partner, a mustachioed New York city cop.
- Little Nicky (Nick Kroll) – (seasons 1–2), a young boy with a rare rapid aging disease, and later the father of Dr. Black's child (also played by Kroll), who inherits Nicky's disease. Little Nicky takes on the stereotypes of an old man once his disease reaches advanced stages. The disease takes his life in season two.
- Dr. Jason Mantzoukas (Nate Corddry) and Dr. Ed Helms (Ed Helms) – (season 1), two doctors who usually appear together and make sexual remarks about The Chief.
- Dr. Max Von Sydow (John Ross Bowie) – (seasons 1–3), a doctor who tries to cure The Chief's condition.
- Dr. Nate Schacter (Seth Morris) – (season 1), another clown doctor with whom Dr. Blake Downs develops a rivalry.
- Ben Hayflick (Kurtwood Smith) – (season 2), head of the National Division of Health who is trying to suppress Dr. Richie's cancer cure to protect its profits; based on the Cigarette Man from the X-Files.
- Derrick Childrens (Jon Hamm) – (seasons 2–3, 5, 7), the son of the founder of Childrens Hospital and secret identity of Valerie Flame. Hamm also plays young Arthur Childrens in flashbacks.
- Dr. Brian (Jordan Peele) – (seasons 2–3; guest appearance in season 5), a black bisexual doctor who left several years ago to consult on Marlon Wayans' show, Black Hospital, he has recently returned to Childrens Hospital. His catchphrase is "Righteous!"
- Nurse Kulap (Kulap Vilaysack) – (seasons 1–4), one of the nurses at Childrens, most often seen assisting Owen and Glenn in the operating room.
- Arthur Childrens – (season 3), Founder of Childrens Hospital. He only appeared in the 1970s and then stopped making appearances. He originated the quote, "I believe the Childrens are our future."
- Rabbi Jewy McJewJew (David Wain) – (seasons 2–7), Dr. Richie's rival from Hebrew school, and the Childrens Hospital chaplain.
- Louis LaFonda (Mather Zickel) – (seasons 2–4), host of Newsreaders, a TV news magazine, he covers the "real-life" developments on the set of Childrens Hospital, and the status of the "real" actors on the show, the episodes of which essentially treat Childrens Hospital as a show within a show. He, like Dr. Richie, first appeared in The Ten. Newsreaders was spun off as its own show on Adult Swim in 2013.

=== "Behind the scenes" ===
The series occasionally presents fictional "behind-the-scenes" episodes, supposedly chronicling the production of the series. These episodes portray Childrens Hospital as a long-running medical drama and typically feature interviews with the self-absorbed, eccentric cast members (also fictional characters). The first such episodes were presented as clips from a fictional 60 Minutes-style newsmagazine entitled Newsreaders, which was later spun off into its own Adult Swim series. These fictional cast members have stories of their own:

- Cutter Spindell as Blake Downs. When Spindell is introduced, he is the only cast member who enjoys working on the show, and spearheads a campaign to save it from cancelation. Spindell is killed in an accident on set at the end of season 4, and is replaced by his identical twin brother Rory Spindell, a film and stage actor who is loathed by the other performers on the show.
- Dixie Peters, legal name Cynthia Quelson, as Cat Black. Peters is a pretentious actress who is fond of unusual makeup and who has an enormous photograph of herself in her dressing room. She marries series director David Wain, but cheats on him with fellow cast member Just Falcon, and the couple eventually divorces. She and cast member Lynn Williams have a long-standing rivalry over their roles in the show and their complicated relationships with director David Wain.
- Just Falcon as Glenn Richie. Falcon is a deeply eccentric man with little ability to relate to other people. He has a long and tumultuous relationship with David Wain, although Falcon is completely unaware of the strife and considers Wain a close friend. Falcon wears a long beard, which is covered up to film the show. Falcon is largely a parody of Joaquin Phoenix in I'm Still Here.
- Rob Huebel (sometimes spelled Heubel) as Owen Maestro. The pronunciation and spelling of Huebel's name changes from episode to episode. Huebel (the character) is a flamboyant gay man whose tastes in fashion and facial hair run towards the 1970s. He is rarely seen without a drink in his hand, and often throws glitter into the air after making a big announcement.
- Lady Jane Bentick-Smith as Chief. Bentick-Smith is an affable English woman, and apparently a member of the British aristocracy. She has a long history of theater work, and much of her dialogue consists of nonsensical Britishisms.
- Lynn Williams as Lola Spratt. Williams is vain and locked in a constant rivalry with co-star Dixie Peters. When not on camera, she sports a thick unibrow, which she describes as "honest".
- Ingrid Hagerstown as Valerie Flame. Hagerstown is a native Swedish speaker, has virtually no knowledge of English, and learns her lines phonetically. She seems to have little relationship with her coworkers, referring to Cutter Spindell as "the man who plays the clown".
- Fred Nunley as Sy Mittleman. Nunley is a character actor who has been brought in to revive several failing television shows, although never successfully. He has a pathological hatred of children; when he gets a spinoff series that partners him with several child costars, he requests that the producers film their scenes separately and digitally insert his image into the footage of the children.
- Glarion Rudge as Nurse Dori. She is a former lover of David Wain's; his continuing attraction to her is not requited.
- Mark Splorn as Chet Mandvanteussen. Mark is revealed to be having an affair with Dixie's mother during Glenn's photography exhibit.
- Melinda Waller as Nurse Beth. The actress that plays Nurse Beth.
- David Wain as Rabbi Jewy McJewJew. Wain is the series director and has had relationships with Peters, Williams, and Rudge. He has worked with Just Falcon for decades, but views Falcon's work with other directors as a betrayal and seeks to sabotage him, culminating in an incident in which Wain purposely leaves bullets in a gun for a scene in which Falcon's character is to play Russian roulette. He creates the character of McJewJew, who steals Glenn Richie's love interests, in a failed attempt to antagonize the oblivious Falcon.

== Episodes ==
Season	Episodes	Originally released		
Season	Episodes	First released	Last released	Network
Web series	10	December 8, 2008		TheWB.com
1	5	July 11, 2010	August 8, 2010	Adult Swim
2	12	August 22, 2010	November 7, 2010	Adult Swim
3	14	June 2, 2011	September 1, 2011	Adult Swim
4	14	August 9, 2012	November 15, 2012	Adult Swim
5	14	July 25, 2013	October 24, 2013	Adult Swim
6	14	March 20, 2015	June 19, 2015	Adult Swim
7	13	January 22, 2016	April 15, 2016	Adult Swim

== Production ==
During the first three seasons, portions of the show were filmed in North Hollywood Medical Center, the same former hospital used for filming Scrubs and several other movies and television programs, until its demolition in 2011. As a parody of the live episode "Ambush" of ER, the season two finale (aired November 7, 2010) was promoted as a live broadcast.

== Reception ==
=== Ratings ===
Despite the low ratings compared to other cable television series, Childrens Hospital still has received its highest ratings to date on its midnight (Eastern Time) slot. On Friday, September 3, 2010, it pulled in 525,000 viewers while the next Sunday yielded 551,000 (in the 18–34 demographic).

=== Awards ===
Year	Award	Category	Nominee(s)	Result	Ref.
2012	Primetime Emmy Award	Outstanding Short-Format Live-Action Entertainment Program	Rob Corddry, Jonathan Stern, David Wain, Keith Crofford, Nick Weidenfeld, Rich Rosenthal	Won	
2013	Primetime Emmy Award	Outstanding Short-Format Live-Action Entertainment Program	Rob Corddry, Jonathan Stern, David Wain, Nick Weidenfeld, Keith Crofford, Rich Rosenthal	Won	
2014	Primetime Emmy Award	Outstanding Short-Format Live-Action Entertainment Program	Rob Corddry, Jonathan Stern, David Wain, Mike Lazzo, Keith Crofford, Ken Marino	Nominated	
2015	Primetime Emmy Award	Outstanding Short-Format Live-Action Entertainment Program	Rob Corddry, Jonathan Stern, David Wain, Mike Lazzo, Keith Crofford, Ken Marino	Nominated	
2016	Primetime Emmy Award	Outstanding Short Form Comedy or Drama Series	Rob Corddry, Jonathan Stern, David Wain, Keith Crofford, Mike Lazzo, Krister Johnson	Won	
2016	Primetime Emmy Award	Outstanding Actor in a Short Form Comedy or Drama Series	Rob Corddry	Won	
2016	Primetime Emmy Award	Outstanding Actor in a Short Form Comedy or Drama Series	Rob Huebel	Nominated	
2016	Primetime Emmy Award	Outstanding Actress in a Short Form Comedy or Drama Series	Erinn Hayes	Nominated	

== Related projects ==
The mock television advertisements presented with the Adult Swim broadcasts of Childrens Hospital season one tied into future Adult Swim programs. A commercial for a crime procedural parody led to the show NTSF:SD:SUV:: (National Terrorism Strike Force: San Diego: Sport Utility Vehicle), which ran from 2011 to 2013. Similarly, a commercial featuring Chris Elliott promoting a fictional health drink called "Nutricai" turned out to be a tie-in with an episode of Eagleheart, one episode of which featured Elliott's character joining a multi-level marketing business selling the product.

Some episodes of Childrens Hospital featured a fictional TV show called Newsreaders, a parody of the CBS show 60 Minutes; this led to Newsreaders being picked up as its own show on Adult Swim, premiering in January 2013. Former Daily Show co-executive producer Jim Margolis served as showrunner, developing the series with Childrens Hospital creators Wain, Corddry, and Jonathan Stern.

In 2011, Corddry stated that the cast and creative team of Childrens Hospital were working on doing a movie together, separate from Childrens Hospital, with a different story and characters.

In 2020, Netflix premiered Medical Police, a ten-episode spinoff of Childrens Hospital. The show stars Hayes and Huebel as Lola and Owen, who are recruited into a globe-spanning mission to uncover a conspiracy behind a global pandemic and find a cure. Åkerman, Bell, Cera, Corddry, Marino, and Winkler also reprised their Childrens Hospital characters as guest performers.
