= Jarrad Paul =

American actor and filmmaker (born 1976)

- Born: June 20, 1976 (age 50); Miami, Florida, U.S.
- Occupations: Screenwriter; director; actor
- Years active: 1989–present

Jarrad Paul (born June 20, 1976) is an American screenwriter, director and actor.

== Early life and education ==
Paul grew up in Miami, Florida. After graduating from high school, he moved to Los Angeles.

== Career ==
Paul co-created and executive produced the Fox comedy The Grinder starring Rob Lowe and Fred Savage. He also co-wrote and co-directed The D Train starring Jack Black and James Marsden, which was purchased at the 2015 Sundance Film Festival by IFC. During the 1990s Paul had a role on Seinfeld as Darin, Home Improvement as Jason and a recurring role in the 2000s on Monk. In 1999, he co-starred with Jay Mohr in Action as screenwriter Adam Rafkin.

Films he has appeared in include 40 Days and 40 Nights, The Shaggy Dog, and Yes Man, which he also co-wrote.

== Filmography ==
=== Films ===
Year	Title	Role	Notes
1997	Liar Liar	Zit Boy	
2002	40 Days and 40 Nights	Duncan	
2005	Kicking & Screaming	Beantown Employee	
2005	Bewitched	Valet	
2006	The Shaggy Dog	Larry	
2008	Yes Man	Reggie	
2013	Movie 43	Bill	Segment: "The Proposition"

=== TV series ===
Year	Title	Role	Notes
1990	A Family for Joe	Chris Bankston	TV movie
1992	Home Fires	Jesse Kramer	6 episodes
1994	Touched by an Angel	Dink Whitten	Episode: "Show Me the Way to Go Home"
1995	Legend	Skeeter	12 episodes
1995	Family Matters	Kevin	Episode: "Hot Rods to Heck"
1995–1996	Home Improvement	Jason	4 episodes
1996	Weird Science	Puppetman	Episode: "Puppet Love"
1996	Cybill	Director	Episode: "Romancing the Crone"
1997	Men Behaving Badly	Pipsqueak	Episode: "I Am What I Am"
1997	Seinfeld	Darin	Episode: "The Voice"
1997	Buffy the Vampire Slayer	Diego	Episode: "Lie to Me"
1997	Ned and Stacey	Mark	Episode: "I Like Your Moxie" (unaired)
1999	Beverly Hills, 90210	Brian	Episode: "Trials and Tribulations"
1999	Vengeance Unlimited	Adam Krieger	Episode: "Clique"
1999	Rude Awakening	Mohel	Episode: "To Bris or Not to Bris"
1999–2000	Action	Adam Rafkin	13 episodes
2001	CSI: Crime Scene Investigation	Teller	Episode: "Fahrenheit 932"
2001	Dead Last	Dr. Leonard	Episode: "Gastric Distress"
2001–2002	UC: Undercover	Cody	11 episodes
2002	Andy Richter Controls the Universe	Todd	Episode: "Relationship Ripcord"
2004	Century City		Episode: "The Haunting"
2004–2009	Monk	Kevin Dorfman	6 episodes
2007	The Singles Table	Adam Leventhal	6 episodes
2010	Important Things with Demetri Martin	Bill	Episode: "2"
2011	Allen Gregory	Announcer/Brian (voice)	2 episodes
2015	Barely Famous		Episode: "Barely Famous"
2015–2016	The Grinder	Pincus	2 episodes
2019	Huge in France		Episode: "Episode Trois"
2021–2024	Chad	Charles	7 episodes
2023	Platonic	Ian	Episode: "San Diego"
2026	Jury Duty Presents: Company Retreat	Graham Gertz	Episode: "Culture Fit"

=== Writer ===
Year	Title	Notes
1998–2003	Stargate SG-1	4 episodes
2005–2007	Living with Fran	6 episodes
2008	Yes Man	
2011	Allen Gregory	4 episodes, also creator
2015	The D Train	Also co-director
2015–2016	The Grinder	2 episodes, also creator
2019	Huge in France	8 episodes, also creator and director
2026	Little Brother	
