= Medical Police =

2020 American comedy streaming television series

- Promotional release poster
- Genre: Comedy; Crime drama
- Created by: Rob Corddry; Krister Johnson; Jonathan Stern; David Wain
- Directed by: David Wain; Bill Benz
- Starring: Erinn Hayes; Rob Huebel
- Music by: Matt Novack
- Country of origin: United States
- Original language: English
- No. of seasons: 1
- No. of episodes: 10

Production
- Executive producers: Rob Corddry; Krister Johnson; Jonathan Stern; David Wain
- Producers: Franny Baldwin; Marco Fargnoli; David Soldinger
- Cinematography: Marco Fargnoli
- Editors: John Daigle; Dean Pollack; Maura Corey
- Running time: 21–28 minutes
- Production companies: Abominable Pictures; David Wain Productions; Mister Krister; The Corddry Company; Warner Horizon Television

Original release
- Network: Netflix
- Release: January 10, 2020

Related
- Childrens Hospital

Medical Police is an American comedy television series, created by Rob Corddry, Krister Johnson, Jonathan Stern and David Wain, that premiered on Netflix on January 10, 2020. It is a spin-off of the short-form alt-comedy series Childrens Hospital, that parodied medical dramas, whereas Medical Police is a parody of international spy thrillers.

The series stars Erinn Hayes and Rob Huebel as Childrens Hospital doctors Lola Spratt and Owen Maestro. When they discover a world-threatening virus, they are recruited as government agents in a globe-spanning race to find a cure. In the process, they unmask a deep conspiracy amidst the outbreak. Released during the early months of the COVID-19 pandemic, the series' depiction of a global disease outbreak has been described as "inadvertently timely."

== Cast ==
=== Main ===
- Erinn Hayes as Dr. Lola Spratt
- Rob Huebel as Dr. Owen Maestro

=== Recurring/Notable guest stars ===
- Malin Åkerman as Valerie Flame
- Sarayu Rao as Sloane McIntyre
- Rob Corddry as Blake Downs
- Tom Wright as Director Patten
- Lake Bell as Cat Black
- Jason Schwartzman as The Goldfinch
- Fred Melamed as Professor Waters
- Michael Cera as Sal Viscuso (voice only)
- Henry Winkler as Sy Mittleman
- Craig Robinson as Edgar Tooby
- Megan Le as Agent Tran
- Ken Marino as Glenn Richie
- Eric Nenninger as Collins
- Randall Park as Clavis Kim
- Lilly Singh as Baroness Von Eaglesburg

== Episodes ==
| No. | Title | Directed by | Written by | Original release date |
|---|---|---|---|---|
| 1 | "Wheels Up" | David Wain | Rob Corddry, Krister Johnson, Jonathan Stern & David Wain | January 10, 2020 |
Doctor Lola Spratt works late into the night on her research when multiple patients turn up at Childrens Hospital in São Paulo, Brazil, infected with a mysterious virus. Lola's research catches the attention of Sloan McIntyre from the US Centers for Disease Control and Prevention (CDC), which invites both her and her co-worker, Doctor Owen Maestro, to join a special task force investigating the same virus across the world. Suspecting the virus to be part of a global terrorist plot, the CDC takes Lola on a cargo plane along with Owen (who used the plane's bathroom and didn't emerge until mid-flight) to Berlin. However, the plane is suddenly hijacked by terrorists disguising themselves as CDC personnel. After fighting off the terrorists, McIntyre stays behind to crash the plane away from a populated area and tells the doctors to find "The Goldfinch." Owen and Lola are forced to use the parachute of a dead terrorist and manage to safely land in Berlin, where they are held up by German police.
| 2 | "The Goldfinch" | David Wain | Max Silvestri | January 10, 2020 |
Lola and Owen manage to talk their way out of trouble and head to a German hospital, where a similar outbreak of the mysterious virus has occurred. While looking for someone suspicious, they find a young Arab male named Hamsi who flees shortly after spotting them. Lola finds a notebook that seems to point to Hamsi as a suspect in the virus attacks. Lola and Owen chase Hamsi through Berlin and almost capture him when they are suddenly kidnapped by a man who reveals himself to be The Goldfinch. The Goldfinch apologizes for kidnapping them and helps them locate Hamsi again. Owen shoots Hamsi in the arm as he pulls out a "pocket pussy," and Hamsi reveals that his actions and the writings in his notebook had nothing to do with the terrorists, but of planning to lose his virginity. Back in Goldfinch's van, a news report shows that the number of affected cities has increased. Meanwhile, one of the terrorists survives the crash, and finds the IDs of Lola and Owen in the wreckage.
| 3 | "Dumb Doggy" | Bill Benz | Jessica Lee Williamson | January 10, 2020 |
Lola and Owen head to the New Hampshire School of Medicine to ask for help from Lola's old teacher, Professor Waters. Waters finds a signature in the virus from a bioterrorist named Matteo Roberto Neri, leading Lola and Owen to travel to his last-known location in Florence. After infiltrating the main records building, Lola finds another clue about Neri's whereabouts, leading them to a clinic in Sudan. Lola and Owen decide to infiltrate the clinic by posing as interior decorators. Meanwhile, Neri gets word of the American agents' arrival and disguises himself as another patient. Lola and Owen escape Neri's trap and find out that Neri was following someone else's orders, but accidentally bisect him while he tries to escape via truck. As Lola digs through his wallet, she finds a photo revealing that Neri had a twin brother.
| 4 | "Mature Group Action" | Bill Benz | Rob Corddry | January 10, 2020 |
Owen unsuccessfully tries to hack into Neri's phone, while Lola finds out that the water park in the photo's background was taken in France (after mistakenly looking in Denmark). An old man at the waterpark then directs them to the Neri brother's last-known location in a Florida retirement community. Lola and Owen find their old co-worker Dr. Glenn Richie working with the retirees, including Frank Nelson (nee Neri) who refuses to help them. The doctors hatch a plot to infiltrate Frank's house and steal photos of his face for a 3D Printer. Frank holds them at gunpoint, but the doctors put him to sleep by singing Rock-a-bye Baby and steal his scrapbook to create a reference for the 3D printer. Several hours of printing and painting later, the doctors stumble onto the common aspect of the 3D Printer model present at each infection site printing the virus, and call the CDC's Director Patten to shut them all down.
| 5 | "Deuce to Nines, Double Draw" | David Wain | Craig Rowin | January 10, 2020 |
Lola and Owen are about to fly home to São Paulo when Neri's phone receives a text message from someone named Nikolai in Latvia. Though Patten orders them to go home, the doctors instead head to Riga where they meet up with Goldfinch, who directs them to the home of Nikolai's mother, who points them to a silent disco where Nikolai challenges Owen to a card game for information. Meanwhile, Lola's friend Cat is prepping for a talent show in Los Angeles when she stumbles upon another bio-terrorist attack. The viral 3D printer is set to go off if the Applause Meter hits 10, forcing Cat to sabotage her own performance. Unfortunately, the crowd applauds as Cat is loaded into an ambulance, setting off the printer. Back in Riga, the doctors torture Nikolai and find out their next lead is in Shanghai.
| 6 | "The Lasagna as a Whole" | Bill Benz | Jess Dweck | January 10, 2020 |
In Shanghai, Lola and Owen visit former Police Sergeant Edgar Toobey to get weapons before meeting the virus's creator. Though he starts off reluctant after Owen shot him, Toobey decides to arm the two doctors after hearing their whole story. Lola and Owen head to a hotel room with one bed, and practice shooting their guns while drinking. The next day, Lola and Owen head to a public square where Lola spots Professor Waters with the virus cure. Lola demands to know his involvement as CDC agents close in on their position and begin firing. Toobey helps the doctors escape from their pursuers as Waters flees the scene, but Lola and Owen run into McIntyre, who turns them over to the Chinese police.
| 7 | "Everybody Panic!" | Bill Benz | Jonathan Stern | January 10, 2020 |
Lola and Owen are put in the same Chinese prison and find their colleague Dr. Blake Downs also imprisoned there for smuggling a koala. Blake directs them to a woman named Baozi, who asks for help for her nephew in exchange for an escape route, but Baozi sells them out to the guards instead. Later, Patten sends Lavator, his surviving mole from the plane, into the prison to finish off Lola and Owen. Lola and Owen use Blake's red makeup to fake a viral infection, and spark a prison riot, where they are later helped by McIntyre and Waters in their escape. Meanwhile, Cat tries to describe the terrorist she saw to an LAPD sketch artist, but they are unable to find a match.
| 8 | "Just the D" | Bill Benz | Emily Heller | January 10, 2020 |
McIntyre reveals that Patten was the mastermind behind the virus plot from the very beginning, and Waters reveals that he was bluffing about having a cure to draw out the CDC agents. The four decide to work together to finish the cure in Bhutan, where the virus hasn't spread yet. Lola discovers she has a viral rash in the bathroom and leaves the cabin. Owen runs outside and finds Lola, and proclaims his love for her. The two then have sex in the snow. Meanwhile, McIntyre uses her black ops credit card at a convenience store, alerting Patten to their location and leading to their capture. The team is taken back to Atlanta, where Waters tests his cure on Lola, but only makes the infection worse. Goldfinch rescues Lola, Owen, and McIntyre as Waters sacrifices himself to buy them time. While reflecting on Waters' last words, Lola realizes she may have created the original virus.
| 9 | "Real Heavy Hitter" | David Wain | Krister Johnson | January 10, 2020 |
Lola flashes back to her past when she wrote a thesis that Waters later stole to create the virus. She realizes the laptop containing the virus directions is currently at her desk in Childrens Hospital. However, upon returning to the hospital, she finds the desk being sold off at the hospital's Desk Auction Gala. Sy Mittleman refuses to let Lola take her laptop from the desk unless she outbids other "desk aficionados" for the whole desk. As Lola and Owen are about to lose the bidding war, Dr Richie appears with the winning bid to let Lola retrieve her old laptop with the information on it. Meanwhile, CDC commandos infiltrate the hospital to silence Lola and Owen. Lola is saved from a gunman's bullet, but it shatters the laptop.
| 10 | "Everything Goes Back to Normal … or Do They??" | David Wain | Rob Corddry & Krister Johnson | January 10, 2020 |
Lola and Owen break into a disused lab in the hospital to try and create the virus cure. Owen decides to perform experimental brain surgery on Lola to help her remember the entire formula. The other doctors and McIntyre fight back against the CDC gunmen in the hospital, while Lavator infiltrates on her own to finish her mission. Owen manages to kill Lavator, and Lola remembers the missing piece of the cure. Patten appears and threatens to shoot the doctors, but is moved to let them finish making the cure after seeing sick children. At the last moment, the cure is transmitted around the world to the same 3D printers that created the virus. Two weeks later, Childrens Hospital goes back to normal, when Lola receives a call from the new head of the CDC: McIntyre.

== Production ==
After Childrens Hospital ended in 2016, series creator Rob Corddry revealed in 2017 that a spin-off series was in development, describing the new show as a "global thriller" with a season-long serial narrative that shifts across countries, unlike Childrens Hospital which eschewed strict continuity, and was set primarily in Brazil. On February 19, 2019, Netflix announced that it had given the production a series order for a first season consisting of ten half-hour episodes. The series was co-created by Rob Corddry, Jonathan Stern, David Wain, and Krister Johnson, who also serve as executive producers and writers. The show is produced by Warner Horizon Scripted TV, which has an overall deal with producer Jonathan Stern.

== Release ==
On December 16, 2019, Netflix announced that Medical Police would premiere on its streaming service globally on January 10, 2020. On December 19, 2019, a trailer for the series was released.

== Reception ==
On the review aggregator website Rotten Tomatoes, the first season has a 92% approval rating with an average rating of 7.12/10, based on 13 reviews. The website's critical consensus reads, "Cop-doctors finally get their due in Medical Police, a show that works almost as well as a good old fashioned action-adventure as it does a delightfully absurd satire about doctor-cops." On Metacritic, the first season has a weighted average score of 62 out of 100, based on 6 critics, indicating "generally favorable reviews".
