= The Singles Table =

2006 television series

- Genre: Sitcom
- Created by: Bill Martin; Mike Schiff
- Directed by: Adam Bernstein
- Starring: John Cho; Conor Dubin; Jarrad Paul; Rhea Seehorn; Alicia Silverstone
- Country of origin: United States
- Original language: English
- No. of seasons: 1
- No. of episodes: 6

Production
- Executive producers: Bill Martin; Mike Schiff
- Camera setup: Single-camera
- Running time: 30 minutes
- Production companies: Mike and Bill Productions; 20th Century Fox Television

Original release
- Network: NBC

The Singles Table is an American comedy series created by Bill Martin and Mike Schiff that was intended to air on NBC during the 2006-07 television season.

It is notable as being one of few series that were canceled before airing a single episode.

== Summary ==
Because of their relationship status and relationships with the bride and groom, five strangers meet at Table 18, a table in a far corner of a wedding reception that is quickly labeled "the singles table". However, through the course of the event, they each begin to question issues in their lives and vow to make things better. For richer or poorer, these five strangers will become good friends—and, in some cases, they may become more than that.

== Cast ==
- Alicia Silverstone as Georgia
- Conor Dubin as Eli
- Jarrad Paul as Adam
- John Cho as Ivan
- Rhea Seehorn as Stephanie

== Production ==
On February 9, 2006, NBC issued a pilot order for the series. On February 27, Adam Bernstein became attached to direct the pilot. The following day saw Jarrad Paul, Rhea Seehorn and Conor Dubin cast in the roles of Adam, Stephanie and Eli respectively. On March 9, Pascale Hutton was cast as Georgia. On March 15, casting was completed with John Cho being cast in the final role in the series, Ivan.

The series was picked up on May 11, for a thirteen-episode first season.

On May 26, it was reported that producers were recasting the role of Georgia. It was not until September 15 that Alicia Silverstone was cast as Hutton's replacement.

As a result of cost-cutting at NBC and assessing its mid-season needs, it was announced on November 6 that production had been shut down and that only six episodes of the thirteen ordered had been completed.

There were plans to air the series during the summer of 2007, but those plans were subsequently scrapped and, as of now, the series remains unaired.

== Episodes ==
| No. | Title | Prod. code |
|---|---|---|
| 1 | "Pilot" | 1AMN79 |
| 2 | "The Work Dinner" | 1AMN01 |
| 3 | "The Brawl" | 1AMN02 |
| 4 | "Georgia's Big Move" | 1AMN03 |
| 5 | "The Housewarming Party" | 1AMN04 |
| 6 | "The Emergency" | 1AMN05 |

== See also ==
- List of television series canceled before airing an episode
