= Huge in France =

American comedy series

- Genre: Comedy
- Created by: Gad Elmaleh; Andrew Mogel; Jarrad Paul
- Written by: Gad Elmaleh; Andrew Mogel; Jarrad Paul; Sascha Rothchild
- Directed by: Andrew Mogel; Jarrad Paul
- Starring: Gad Elmaleh; Erinn Hayes; Jordan Ver Hoeve; Matthew Del Negro; Scott Keiji Takeda
- Composer: Jeff Cardoni
- Country of origin: United States
- Original languages: English; French
- No. of seasons: 1
- No. of episodes: 8

Production
- Executive producers: Andrew Mogel; Jarrad Paul; Gad Elmaleh; Anna Dokoza; Sascha Rothchild
- Producers: Rachel Shukert; John Blickstead; Trey Kollmer; Hal Olofsson; Arlyn Richardson
- Camera setup: Single-camera
- Running time: 28-34 minutes

Original release
- Network: Netflix
- Release: April 12, 2019

Huge in France is an American comedy television miniseries on Netflix starring Gad Elmaleh as a French comedian who has moved to Los Angeles in an effort to be closer to his son.

The show premiered on April 12, 2019.

== Plot ==
Gad Elmaleh, or simply Gad, is a very popular comedian in France who has decided to move to Los Angeles to become closer to his estranged son, Luke. Luke is aspiring to become a model while his mother Vivian is an author and life coach. Vivian's boyfriend is Jason Alan Ross, a retired actor who is mentoring Luke on modeling.

Gad along with his assistant, Brian, devise various plans to disrupt the relationship between Jason and his old family.

== Cast and characters ==
=== Main cast ===
- Gad Elmaleh as Gad Elmaleh
- Matthew Del Negro as Jason Alan Ross
- Erinn Hayes as Vivian
- Scott Keiji Takeda as Brian Kurihara
- Jordan Ver Hoeve as Luke

=== Recurring ===
- Austin Fryberger as Zene
- Keana Marie as James
- Brittany Ross as Heather
- André Tardieu as Adrian
- Chris D’Elia as himself
- Jerry Seinfeld as himself

== Episodes ==
No. overall	No. in season	Title	Original release date
1	1	"Episode Un"	April 12, 2019
2	2	"Episode Deux"	April 12, 2019
3	3	"Episode Trois"	April 12, 2019
4	4	"Episode Quatre"	April 12, 2019
5	5	"Episode Cinq"	April 12, 2019
6	6	"Episode Six"	April 12, 2019
7	7	"Episode Sept"	April 12, 2019
8	8	"Episode Huit"	April 12, 2019
