= Erinn Hayes =

American actress (born 1976)

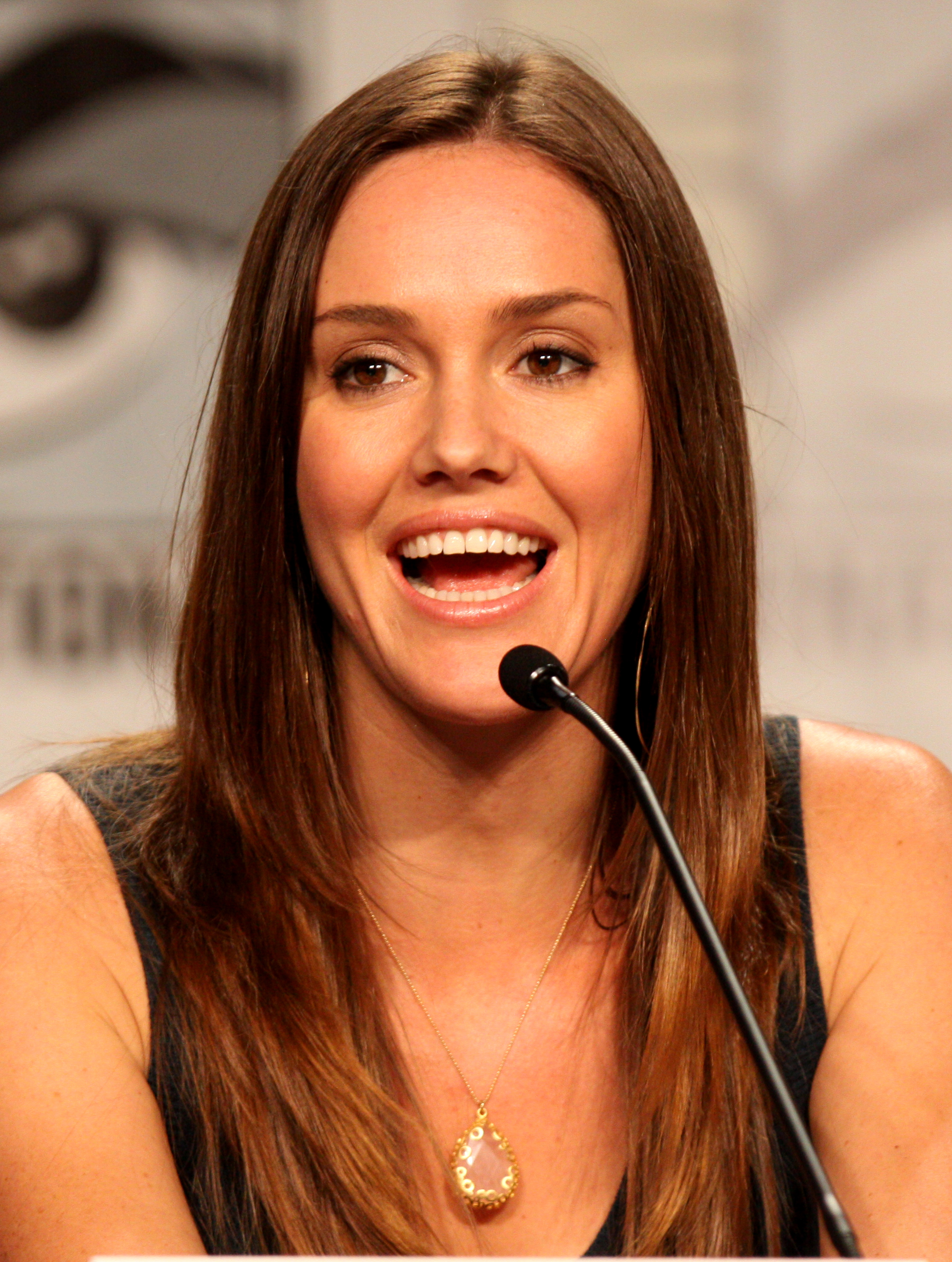
- Hayes at the 2011 San Diego Comic-Con
- Born: Erinn Carter; May 25, 1976 (age 50); San Fernando, California, U.S.
- Education: University of Colorado Boulder
- Occupations: Actress; comedian
- Years active: 2001–present
- Spouse: Jack Hayes (m. 2004)
- Children: 2

Erinn Hayes (née Carter; born May 25, 1976) is an American actress and comedian. She is known for her role as Dr. Lola Spratt on the sitcom Childrens Hospital (2008–2016), which she later reprised in its spin-off series Medical Police (2020). For her role, Hayes received a nomination for the Primetime Emmy Award for Outstanding Actress in a Short Form Comedy or Drama Series in 2016.

She has played roles in a number of network sitcoms, including Alison on The Winner (2007), Melanie Clayton on Worst Week (2008–2009), Sheila on Guys with Kids (2012–2013), and Donna Gable on Kevin Can Wait (2016–2017). Her film credits include It's a Disaster (2012), They Came Together (2014), Band Aid (2017), Bill & Ted Face the Music (2020), and A Christmas Story Christmas (2022).

== Early life ==
Erinn Hayes was born in San Fernando, California. She attended the University of Colorado at Boulder and graduated in 1998 with a Bachelor of Fine Arts degree in performance.

== Career ==
In 2005, Hayes appeared as a chef Becky Sharp on Fox's short-lived Kitchen Confidential. Also, in that same year, she played the role of Pam Dawber in the TV movie Behind the Camera: The Unauthorized Story of Mork & Mindy alongside costar Chris Diamantopoulos. Hayes played Alison on the television show The Winner in 2007.

Hayes played the role of Dr. Lola Spratt in the satirical comedy series Childrens Hospital on Adult Swim. She was nominated for an Emmy for Outstanding Actress in a Short Form Comedy or Drama Series in 2016.

Hayes played the role of Melanie Clayton on the CBS comedy series Worst Week. The series was an Americanized version of the British comedy The Worst Week of My Life. She then later starred on the NBC comedy series Guys with Kids. She starred in films such as It's a Disaster, The Watch, and They Came Together. Hayes co-starred in the second season of Hulu's reality TV parody series The Hotwives of Las Vegas in 2015.

In 2015, she performed as an inmate on the band Dengue Fever's video for the song "No Sudden Moves".

In 2016, Hayes began co-starring in the CBS series Kevin Can Wait, portraying the role of Kevin Gable's wife Donna. Following its renewal after the first season, Hayes was fired from the series for unspecified creative reasons. The series was canceled after its second season.

In April 2019, she played the role of Vivian in the Netflix series Huge in France, co-starring with Gad Elmaleh.

In January 2020, Hayes played the role of Lola Spratt in the series Medical Police, with co-star Rob Huebel, for distribution on Netflix. That same year, she starred as Princess Elizabeth Logan, Ted's wife, in Bill & Ted Face the Music, the third installment in the Bill & Ted film series.

In 2022, Hayes played Ralphie's wife, Sandy Parker, in A Christmas Story Christmas, a sequel to the 1983 film A Christmas Story, for Warner Bros. Pictures, Legendary Pictures, and HBO Max.

== Personal life ==
In 2004, Hayes married her high school sweetheart Jack Hayes, a construction supervisor. They have two daughters.

== Filmography ==
=== Film ===
Year	Title	Role	Notes
2001	Final Stab	Kristin	
2005	Rumor Has It...	Wedding Coordinator	
2012	It's a Disaster	Emma Mandrake	
2012	The Watch	Bob's Wife	
2014	Hits	Maddy	
2014	They Came Together	Valerie	
2014	A Better You	Lindsay	
2014	One-Minute Time Machine	Regina	
2016	Interior Night	Charlotte	
2017	Band Aid	Crystal Vichycoisse	
2017	Fixed	Eve	
2018	Sharon 1.2.3.	Sharon #1	
2020	Holly Slept Over	Marnie	
2020	Bill & Ted Face the Music	Princess Elizabeth	
2021	Witness Infection	Patricia Miola	
2022	A Christmas Story Christmas	Sandy Parker	
2023	The Donor Party	Molly	

=== Television ===
Year	Title	Role	Notes
2001	Providence	Waitress	Episode: "Falling"
2003	On the Spot	Brenda	Main role; 5 episodes
2003	The West Wing	Laura	Episode: "Constituency of One"
2003	Eve	Fiona	Episode: "'Twas The Fight Before Christmas"
2004	CSI: Crime Scene Investigation	Debbie Marlin	Episode: "Butterflied"
2004	North Shore	Eva Latisse	Episode: "Surprise Party"
2004	Everwood	Mindy Wheeler	2 episodes
2004	Will & Grace	Katherine Fallon	Episode: "The Newlydreads"
2004	Significant Others	Cynthia	4 episodes
2005	Behind the Camera: The Unauthorized Story of 'Mork and Mindy'	Pam Dawber	TV movie
2005–2006	Kitchen Confidential	Becky	4 episodes
2006	Modern Men	Barbara	Episode: "The Homewrecker"
2007	Shark	Ellie Davis	Episode: "Teacher's Pet"
2007	Eyes	Gayle Kearney	Episode: "Innocence"
2007	The Winner	Alison McKellar	6 episodes
2008	Family Guy	Jared's Mom (voice)	Episode: "The Former Life of Brian"
2008	Unhitched	Pam	2 episodes
2008–2010	Notes from the Underbelly	Beverly	2 episodes
2008–2016	Childrens Hospital	Lola Spratt	Main role; 65 episodes
2009	Worst Week	Melanie Clayton	Main role; 16 episodes
2009	Hawthorne	Maureen McKinley	Episode: "Mother's Day"
2009	Grey's Anatomy	Cathy Becker	Episode: "I Saw What I Saw"
2010	Romantically Challenged	Vanessa	Episode: "Perry and Rebecca's High School Reunion"
2010	Parenthood	Racquel	6 episodes
2010	Royal Pains	Faith Green	Episode: "Keeping the Faith"
2010	Two and a Half Men	Gretchen	Episode: "The Immortal Mr. Billy Joel"
2011	Desperate Housewives	Lisa	Episode: "And Lots of Security..."
2011–2012	How to Be a Gentleman	Lauren	2 episodes
2012	Suits	Casino Employee	Episode: "All In"
2012–2013	Guys with Kids	Sheila	Main role; 16 episodes
2013	Wedding Band	Emily Corgy	Episode: "End of the World as We Know It"
2013	Robot Chicken	Mother / Daughter / Christmas 2065 Narrator / Reporter (voice)	Episode: "Born Again Virgin Christmas Special"
2013–2015	Parks and Recreation	Annabel Porter	2 episodes
2014	The Mason Twins	Lizzie Mason	Unsold NBC pilot
2014	Workaholics	Miss BS	Episode: "Miss BS"
2014	Growing Up Fisher	Madi	Episode: "Madi About You"
2014	Comedy Bang! Bang!	Dog Thief	Episode: "Steven Yeun Wears Rolled Up Black Jeans & No Socks"
2014	The League	Heather	Episode: "Epi Sexy"
2014	Benched	Francine	Episode: "Solitary Refinement"
2014–2015	New Girl	Ruth	Episodes: "Landline", "Coming Out"
2015	One Big Happy	Kate	Episode: "Crushing It"
2015	The Odd Couple	Dr. Sharon	Episode: "Heal Thyself"
2015	The Hotwives of Las Vegas	Callie Silversan	7 episodes
2015–2024	Last Week Tonight with John Oliver	Maternity / Wife	2 episodes
2016	Transparent	Lisa	Episode: "Exciting and New"
2016–2017	Kevin Can Wait	Donna Gable	Main role (season 1); 24 episodes
2017	Wrecked	Rosa	Episode: "Tony Pepperoni"
2018	A.P. Bio	Trish	Episode: "Freakin' Enamored"
2018	The Dangerous Book for Boys	Beth McKenna	6 episodes
2019	Huge in France	Vivian	Main role
2019	Best Seller	Charleese	Episode: "Pilot"
2020	Medical Police	Dr. Lola Spratt	Main role
2020	Room 104	Linda	Episode: "Oh, Harry!"
2020–2022	The Goldbergs	Jane Bales	8 episodes
2022	Murderville	Lisa Capobianco	Episode: "Most Likely to Commit Murder"
2022	Gaslit	Peggy Ebbitt	2 episodes
2022	Kevin Can F**k Himself	Molly	Episode: "Allison's House"
2024	The Good Doctor	Gilly Howard	Episode: "Date Night"
2024	Sing: Thriller	Additional voice	Miscredited as "Erin Hayes"; Halloween special
2024–present	Grimsburg	Harmony Flute (voice)	26 episodes
2024–2025	St. Denis Medical	Dr. Taylor	2 episodes
2025	The Neighborhood	Clara	Episode: "Welcome to the Pickle"
2025	NCIS	Wendy	Episode: "Close to Home"
2026	It's Not Like That	Lori Soto	Main role
