= Less than Perfect =

American television sitcom (2002–2006)

- Genre: Sitcom
- Created by: Terri Minsky
- Starring: Sara Rue; Sherri Shepherd; Andrea Parker; Zachary Levi; Eric Roberts; Andy Dick; Will Sasso; Patrick Warburton
- Theme music composer: Cary R. Beare; Jason Thomas Gordon; Sky Nicholas; Dan Northchild
- Opening theme: "A Girl Like You" (season 2)
- Composers: Jonathan Wolff; Rich Ragsdale (2002–04); Scott Clausen (2004–06)
- Country of origin: United States
- Original language: English
- No. of seasons: 4
- No. of episodes: 81 (8 unaired) (list of episodes)

Production
- Executive producers: Nina Wass; Eugene Stein; Terri Minsky (2002–03); Christine Zander (2003–06)
- Producer: Sara Rue
- Camera setup: Multi-camera
- Running time: 30 minutes
- Production companies: Wass/Stein Productions; Touchstone Television

Original release
- Network: ABC
- Release: October 1, 2002 – June 6, 2006

Less than Perfect is an American television sitcom created by Terri Minsky and starring Sara Rue and Sherri Shepherd which originally aired on ABC from October 1, 2002, to June 6, 2006. It follows Claude (Rue), who works at a television network named GNB, as well as her friends and colleagues.

== Overview and premise ==
The show centers on Claude Casey (Sara Rue), a young woman who works at GNB, a television network. Though at first a temp who fills in on other assignments, Claude is hired in the pilot by anchor Will Butler (Eric Roberts) to be his assistant. Claude's fellow co-assistants Lydia Weston (Andrea Parker) and Kipp Steadman (Zachary Levi) are unhappy at Claude's arrival, and do everything they can to make her miserable. Luckily, Claude is able to navigate the workplace with the help of her best friends Ramona Platt (Sherri Shepherd) and Owen Kronsky (Andy Dick), who also work at the network in other departments. In season two, two new characters joined the series: Will Sasso as Claude's neighbor and GNB cafeteria head Carl Monari; and Patrick Warburton as Jeb Denton, ladder-climbing news anchor and Lydia's love interest. Sasso, who had recurred throughout the last half of the first season, was upgraded at the beginning of the season; Warburton began as a recurring character in the first half of the season, before being upgraded at midseason.

Much was made at the time of the show's premiere about the central character of the show being a "full figured" woman, and that the title correlated to Claude being "Less Than Perfect." Over the course of the series, Rue lost 30 pounds (14 kg; 2.1 st). She has since become a spokesperson for Jenny Craig and lost a total of 50 pounds (23 kg; 3.6 st). As the series progressed, Rue's figure became less of a focus on the series.

== History ==
Though it was never a ratings juggernaut, Less than Perfect aired at a time when ABC was seeing a large ratings decline across the network. However, the series received steady, respectable ratings, especially for being in the last slot of ABC's Tuesday night sitcom lineup. The overall ratings for season two, which creator Terri Minsky later departed, actually saw an increase from the ratings of season one. However, in its third season, ABC moved the series to its TGIF revival lineup on Friday nights. This led to a major decline in ratings, and put the show at risk for cancellation; VGuide.com featured the show on a list of "Endangered Series." Due to the series being near the threshold for the number of episodes needed for syndication, and the series still earning respectable ratings in the coveted 18–49 demographic, ABC ordered a 13-episode fourth season to air as a mid-season replacement.

For the fourth season, the series underwent a retooling that saw the departure of cast member Eric Roberts. Despite the close renewal, the future of the series was not assured. In January 2006, Zachary Levi said that many of the cast members were ready to move on after filming the season. In March, Sara Rue was cast in a CBS sitcom pilot Play Nice, starring as a woman who runs a toy company with her brother (the pilot was ultimately not picked up). After almost a year off the air, the series returned on April 18, 2006, in its old Tuesday night timeslot.

After airing only three episodes of the fourth season, ABC cancelled Less than Perfect. The series was one of several sitcoms cancelled by the network, as they discontinued both the Tuesday night and Friday night sitcom lineups. ABC initially planned to burn off the remaining nine episodes with fellow cancelled sitcom Rodney, which had taken over its time slot the season prior. ABC ultimately aired only two more episodes before pulling both series off the schedule.

The show joined Lifetime Television's lineup on June 1, 2009 in syndication. The network aired all 81 episodes, including the seven unaired episodes from season four. However, Lifetime dropped the series in 2010. In April 2012, Less Than Perfect joined the lineup of new Canadian network, ABC Spark.

=== Opening credits and theme ===
From the beginning, Less than Perfect had a simple opening sequence, credits which were played over the opening scene of each episode of season one. However, a new theme song and opening sequence were introduced at the beginning of season two. The intro was abandoned after the first seven episodes, reverting to the previous simple credits which lasted until the end of season three. Season four introduced a five-second opening, in which the title can be seen on post-it notes on an office desk, while a brief instrumental version of the theme tune is played.

== Cast and characters ==
=== Main ===
The initial cast of Less than Perfect back row (l-r) Ramona, Kipp and Lydia front row (l-r) Owen, Claude and Will.

- Sara Rue as Claudia "Claude" Casey, the quirky, sweet lead character. From Pittsburgh, Claude works as the executive assistant for GNB anchorman Will Butler. Initially insecure due to the fish out of water template she personifies, Claude gains confidence in herself and her abilities as the series progresses.
- Sherri Shepherd as Ramona Platt, a sassy co-worker and friend of Claude and Owen. She is sometimes bossy and obnoxious, but is still a loyal and caring friend. She dislikes both Kipp and Lydia.
- Andrea Parker as Lydia Weston, one of Claude's "frenemies". She is shallow, snobby, and professionally ambitious, although without noticeable work skills. Lydia finds Claude to be a hick and a walking fashion faux pas. Eventually, Lydia begins a relationship with Jeb Denton, and marries him in the season three finale. In season four, she becomes the producer of Jeb's news segment, and hires Claude as her assistant.
- Zachary Levi as Kipp Steadman, Claude's other frenemy and Lydia's best friend, eventually becomes Jeb Denton's assistant. He is shown to be arrogant, shallow, and snobby, but is more intelligent, and occasionally shows flashes of far more humanity than Lydia (seen in episodes such as The Pimp Hat and Why Are You Hurting Claude?).
- Andy Dick as Owen Kronsky, a seriously offbeat, sensitive, and sometimes clumsy office supply manager with GNB.
- Eric Roberts as Will Butler (seasons 1–3), Claude's charming, but vain boss, a well-known national news anchor. He is a womanizer with several ex-wives. Will unexpectedly (and offstage) quits the network at the start of season 4, forcing Claude to scramble for another position—working for Lydia.
- Will Sasso as Carl Monari (Seasons 2–4; recurring season 1), the cafeteria manager at GNB. He is a friend of Claude, Ramona, and Owen. He lives across the hall from Claude, and becomes her boyfriend in season four.
- Patrick Warburton as Jeb Denton (Seasons 2–4), Will Butler's co-anchor, and Lydia's boyfriend (later husband). Jeb is a mellow, funny, and ambitious news anchor, who is trying to climb the ladder at GNB. He is Kipp's boss, but rarely refers to him by name, mostly as "Secretary." His favorite food is Crab Cakes.

=== Recurring ===
- Josh Braaten as Charlie, Claude's boyfriend from the travel department (Seasons 1 & 3)
- William Ragsdale as Mitch Calgrove, a producer at GNB who Claude dates (Season 2)
- John Eric Bentley as an assistant director who later returns as a director (Seasons 1 & 4)
- French Stewart as Gene Schmidtline, an employee at GNB who has a crush on Ramona (Seasons 2–3)
- Jenny McCarthy as Dani, Will's on-and-off girlfriend (Seasons 1-2)
- Diana-Maria Riva as Vivian, Carl's ex-girlfriend (Seasons 2–3)
- Jonna Tamases as Irene, a co-worker at GNB who offers Claude a job (Season 4)

=== Guest stars ===
- Martin Mull as Buddy Casey, Claude's dad (Season 1)
- Cindy Williams as Joan Casey, Claude's mom (Season 1)
- Joanna Cassidy as Norma (Season 1)
- Michael Boatman as Ted Elliot, a director who employs Claude (Seasons 1 & 2)
- Trista Rehn as herself (Season 1)
- Richard Ruccolo as Bobby Casey, Claude's brother (Season 1)
- Barry Bostwick as Max Damarius (Season 1)
- Nicole Sullivan as Deirdre Bishop, Owen's love interest (Season 1)
- George Wyner as Alan Turnbach, head of GNB news (Seasons 1 & 4)
- Simon Helberg as Arthur (season 2)
- Randee Heller as Mrs. Ross (season 2)
- Gordon Clapp as Detective Martin (season 2)
- Pamela Anderson as Vicki Devorski (season 2)
- Bill Walton as himself (season 2)
- Joanna Kerns and Valerie Harper as Judy and Judith, Owen's lesbian mothers. (seasons 2 & 3)
- Michael Angarano as George Denton, Jeb's son (seasons 2 & 3)
- Lesley Ann Warren as Diane Steadman, Kipp's mom (season 2)
- Brooke Burke as Nurse Benson (season 2)
- James Belushi as sandwich vendor Eddie Smirkoff (season 2)
- John McEnroe as himself (season 2)
- Tori Spelling as Roxanne Fiedler, Claude's childhood best friend. (season 2)
- Lucy Lawless as Tracy Fletcher (season 3)
- Richard Kind as Lance Corcoran (season 3)
- John Di Maggio as Bartender (season 3)
- David Cassidy as Vince (season 3)
- Paula Abdul as Kathleen (season 3)
- Kimberly Williams as Laura (season 3)
- Regis Philbin as Xin Xao Pi (season 3)
- Joan Rivers as Louise (season 3)
- Paul DiMeo, Tracy Hutson & Michael Moloney as themselves, the cast of Extreme Makeover (season 3)
- Star Jones as Dr Curtis (season 3)
- Christopher Knight as Waiter (season 3)
- Joey McIntyre as Ethan (season 4)
- Tony Plana as The Owl Inspector (season 4)
- Natasha Alam as Daniella (season 3)

== Episodes ==
Season	Episodes	Originally released	
Season	Episodes	First released	Last released
1	22	October 1, 2002	May 20, 2003
2	24	September 23, 2003	May 18, 2004
3	22	September 24, 2004	April 15, 2005
4	13 (Note: 8 episodes remained unaired until syndication on Lifetime)	April 18, 2006	June 6, 2006 (Note: The date of ABC's final airing)

== Distribution ==
=== International broadcast ===
Less than Perfect was seen on ATV in Austria, on Nelonen in Finland, on FOX8 (pay TV) and the Seven Network (free to air) in Australia, on MTV Russia in Russia, on Star World for the rest of Asia, on yesSTARS in Israel, on Cuatro in Spain, on Sky Italia's Fox and MTV Italia in Italy, on Kanal 5 in Denmark, on HRT and Fox Life in Croatia, Serbia, Macedonia, Poland and Bulgaria, on TV-First in Belarus. The first seven episodes and episode nine of the final season of Less than Perfect aired on TV2 in New Zealand, with the remaining episodes (eight and 10 through 13) not played. The show also aired on MBC 4 to Arabic speaking viewers. In Turkey, TNT Turkey airs. And ComedyMax currently airs the show for Digiturk subscribers and Comedy Smart airs for D-Smart subscribers. The show was originally screened in the UK and Ireland on ABC1 where it broadcast all episode and repeated the series up until its closure in 2007. It has previously been aired on RTÉ TWO in Ireland, while it also aired on Paramount Comedy 1 (now Comedy Central) in the UK and Ireland, although it is not currently being shown on either of these two networks. As of April 2013, ABC Spark in Canada are broadcasting the show in quadruple bills, twice daily. Lifetime also reran the show for a brief period in 2009. In Italy, it aired on Fox as Perfetti...ma non troppo (Perfect...but not too much) from September 1, 2003 until May 13, 2007.

=== Home media ===
Lionsgate Home Entertainment released the first season of Less than Perfect on DVD in Region 1 on September 7, 2010. An error occurred on the set, in which the episodes appear in production code order rather that order of airdate, causing a particular issue with the season finale, which appears second-to-last and would chronologically be out-of-order if the second season were to be released on DVD.

== Reception ==
=== Critical reception ===
Early reviews for the show found the characterization generally stereotypical, but critics often praised the performance of Sara Rue. USA Today asserted that "in just two episodes, the good guys/bad guys structure and the exaggerated characterizations already are showing signs of wear," although it called Rue a "welcome addition" to TV sitcoms. People magazine likewise criticized the stereotypical characters, but summarized the show as "Hardly perfect but happily Rueful." However, by Season 3, USA Today said the show had "hit its stride." On the review aggregator website Rotten Tomatoes, 33% of 18 critics' reviews are positive, with an average rating of 6.5/10.

=== Ratings ===
Season	Episodes	Timeslot (EDT)	Season premiere	Season finale	TV season	Rank	Viewers (in millions)
1	22	Tuesday 9:30 PM	October 1, 2002	May 20, 2003	2002–03	85	8.10
2	24	Tuesday 9:30 PM	September 23, 2003	May 18, 2004	2003–04	66	8.80
3	22	Friday 9:30 PM	September 24, 2004	April 15, 2005	2004–05	94	6.20
4	13 (Note: 8 episodes remained unaired until syndication on Lifetime.)	Tuesday 9:30 PM	April 18, 2006	June 6, 2006 (Note: The date of ABC's final airing.)	2005–06	115	4.90

=== Awards and nominations ===
Year	Association	Category	Recipient(s)	Result
2003	Teen Choice Awards	Choice Breakout TV Show	Less Than Perfect	Nominated
2003	Satellite Awards	Best Supporting Actor – Musical or Comedy Series	Eric Roberts	Won
2005	BET Comedy Awards	Outstanding Supporting Actress in a Comedy Series	Sherri Shepherd	Nominated
2005	WIN Awards	Outstanding Lead Actress in a Comedy Series	Andrea Parker	Won
