= Big Day =

American television series

- Genre: Sitcom
- Created by: Josh Goldsmith; Cathy Yuspa
- Starring: Marla Sokoloff; Josh Cooke; Wendie Malick; Kurt Fuller; Terry Chen; Miriam Shor; Stephnie Weir; Diora Baird; Stephen Rannazzisi
- Music by: David Schwartz
- Country of origin: United States
- Original language: English
- No. of seasons: 1
- No. of episodes: 13

Production
- Executive producers: Josh Goldsmith; Cathy Yuspa; Matthew Carlson
- Producer: Jason Fisher
- Camera setup: Single-camera
- Running time: 30 minutes
- Production companies: Goldsmith/Yuspa Productions; Sony Pictures Television

Original release
- Network: ABC
- Release: November 28, 2006 – January 30, 2007

Big Day, originally titled A Day in the Life, is an American television sitcom that first aired on ABC from November 28, 2006, to January 30, 2007. The series was co-produced by Josh Goldsmith and Cathy Yuspa and directed by Michael Spiller for Sony Pictures Television.

Originally, it was supposed to debut on October 5, 2006, along with Notes from the Underbelly, but ABC made a last-minute change in its schedule by moving Ugly Betty to Thursday, thus replacing both sitcoms whose "buzz" was not especially promising.

Big Day was broadcast on Tuesdays at 9:00/8:00c. The timeslot was to be filled by another new sitcom that had a better "buzz," The Knights of Prosperity, but ABC moved that program to Wednesdays to make Big Day a priority. According to the ratings, Big Day turned out to be a ratings disappointment.

When Big Day ended its first season on January 30, 2007, only 12 of the 13 produced episodes aired leaving the 13th episode, titled The $10,000 Check, unaired.

On May 15, 2007, ABC officially cancelled the show after the network announced their 2007–2008 fall schedule.

== Synopsis ==
Big Day follows a major event in a couples' life: the wedding day, during the course of one day from all the characters' viewpoints.

All of these events and other obstacles Danny and Alice will have to face before they walk down the aisle and say "I Do", unless someone should stand up and ask why this couple should not marry. Danny worked as a Camp Counselor.

The story arc has similarities to the 2004–2006 BBC series The Worst Week of My Life, which has also been the subject of a FOX pilot (2005), and the CBS sitcom Worst Week (2008).

== Cast and characters ==
| Actor | Character |
|---|---|
| Marla Sokoloff | Alice Hopkins |
| Josh Cooke | Danny Garfinkle |
| Kurt Fuller | Dr. Steve Hopkins |
| Wendie Malick | Jane Hopkins |
| Terry Chen | Johnny |
| Miriam Shor | Becca Hopkins |
| Stephen Rannazzisi | Jay "Skobo" Skobinsky |
| Stephnie Weir | Lorna |
| Diora Baird | Kristin |
| Leslie Odom, Jr. | Freddy |

== Episodes ==
| No. | Title | Directed by | Written by | Original release date |
|---|---|---|---|---|
| 1 | "Pilot" | Michael Spiller | Josh Goldsmith & Cathy Yuspa | November 28, 2006 |
Today is the big day! The moment Danny and Alice were waiting for has arrived. Today is their wedding day, but things for the happy couple soon become complicated.
| 2 | "The World According to Garf" | Michael Spiller | Justin Adler | December 5, 2006 |
When Danny’s father, aka "The Garf", comes in bicycling Maine to assist the wedding, everyone thinks that it couldn’t get more awkward.
| 3 | "Skobo and Alice Hooked Up" | Sarah Pia Anderson | Dan Kopelman | December 12, 2006 |
When Becca and Skobo try to get each other banned from the wedding, secrets start to surface.
| 4 | "The Bachelor Party" | Michael Spiller | Matthew Carlson | December 19, 2006 |
While Lorna deals with a rival wedding planner to get a replacement tent, the guys make a detour to a strip club.
| 5 | "Stolen Vows" | Bryan Cranston | Maggie Bandur | December 19, 2006 |
The couple’s honeymoon island is taken over by rebels, and Danny begs Skobo to use his connections to book an alternative.
| 6 | "Alice Can't Dance" | Michael Spiller | Bill Daly | December 26, 2006 |
Danny and Alice are coached for their big dance by an instructor, but it doesn’t go well.
| 7 | "Boobzilla" | Millicent Shelton | Chrissy Pietrosh & Jessica Goldstein | December 26, 2006 |
Skobo loses the wedding rings while Steve, Becca and Danny are going to the hospital since Steve has been called in for an emergency. Meanwhile, Alice's bridesmaids show up, one of them wearing a dress that shows plenty of her enormous unforeseen breasts.
| 8 | "War with the Neighbors" | Michael Spiller | Bob Nickman | January 2, 2007 |
The next door neighbours are threatening the wedding when they have a huge kid’s birthday party and ultimately end up attacking the staff with paintball guns.
| 9 | "The Unstable Minister" | Adam Arkin | Justin Adler | January 9, 2007 |
During a pre-marital meeting, the minister behaves inappropriately and as a consequence ends up being fired. Steve and Jane quarrel over the costs of the wedding.
| 10 | "Last Chance to Marry Jane" | Michael Spiller | Dan Kopelman | January 16, 2007 |
Jane’s ex-boyfriend shows up and Danny gets cold feet. Lorna hires her ex-fiancé (who dumped her).
| 11 | "Magic Hour" | Victor Nelli Jr. | Maggie Bandur | January 23, 2007 |
Jane’s old boyfriend gets her stoned while they reconnect. Meanwhile, Steve doesn’t want Alice to marry Danny.
| 12 | "The Ceremony" | Michael Spiller | Bill Daly and Chrissy Pietrosh & Jessica Goldstein | January 30, 2007 |
Alice and Danny get stuck when their car breaks down in the middle of nowhere, while back at home Jane and Steve decide to renew their wedding vows.
| 13 | "The $10,000 Gift" | Michael Spiller | Bob Nickman | Unaired |
Steve gives a $10,000 wedding gift to the couple but Alice refuses while Danny is thrilled to accept it.

== Nielsen ratings ==
| Season | Timeslot (EDT) | Series Premiere | Series Finale | TV Season | Rank | Viewers (in millions) |
|---|---|---|---|---|---|---|
| 1 | Tuesday 9:00 P.M. (2006–2007) | November 28, 2006 | January 30, 2007 | 2006–2007 | #118 | 5.3 (#116) |

== International broadcasters ==
| Country | TV Network(s) | Series Premiere | Timeslot |
|---|---|---|---|
| United States | American Broadcasting Company | November 28, 2006 | (cancelled) |
| United Kingdom | ITV2 (First Run); Paramount Comedy 1 (Repeats) | May 15, 2007 | Tuesday's around 11pm (repeated Fridays at 8pm) (ITV2) |
| Turkey | ComedyMax | | |
| Latin America | Sony Entertainment Television | November 5, 2007 | Mondays at 9pm in space "Mentes Peligrosas" ("Dangerous Minds") (repeated Saturdays around 11am) |
| New Zealand | TV2 | February 2008 | Fridays at 7:30pm (final episode aired on May 2) |
| Australia | Nine HD | August 13, 2008 | Wednesdays at 10.30pm (final episode aired on October 15) |
| Belgium | vtm | unknown | Sunday's around 2:30pm |
