= Gary Unmarried =

- Also known as: Project Gary
- Genre: Sitcom
- Created by: Ed Yeager
- Directed by: James Burrows; Ted Wass (pilot)
- Starring: Jay Mohr; Paula Marshall; Ryan Malgarini; Kathryn Newton; Keegan-Michael Key; Brooke D'Orsay; Rob Riggle; Jaime King; Al Madrigal; Ed Begley Jr.
- Theme music composer: Kingsize
- Composer: Paul Buckley
- Country of origin: United States
- Original language: English
- No. of seasons: 2
- No. of episodes: 37 (list of episodes)

Production
- Executive producers: Ed Yeager; James Burrows; Rob DesHotel; Ric Swartzlander; Ira Ungerleider
- Producers: Jill Cargerman; Jay Mohr; Dionne Kirschner
- Camera setup: Multi-camera
- Running time: 30 minutes
- Production companies: Ed Yeager Productions; Rude Mood Productions; CBS Paramount Network Television; CBS Television Studios; ABC Studios

Original release
- Network: CBS
- Release: September 24, 2008 – March 17, 2010

Gary Unmarried is an American sitcom created by Ed Yeager, which ran on CBS from September 24, 2008, to March 17, 2010. The series focuses on a recently divorced couple (Jay Mohr and Paula Marshall) sharing custody of their kids while starting new relationships. The show was produced by ABC Studios and CBS Television Studios, and Yeager and Ric Swartzlander served as executive producers for the first season. The series was known as Project Gary during tapings before premiering on television.

On May 18, 2010, CBS canceled the series after two seasons, leaving an unresolved plotline at the end of the second season.

== Premise ==
The series centers around the life of Gary Brooks (Jay Mohr) and begins three months after he and his ex-wife, Allison Brooks (Paula Marshall), officially divorce. Gary owns a house painting business and bought his own place after his divorce. Now his life revolves around trying to move on from his marriage and get back out into the dating scene while constantly having to deal with his ex-wife because they have two children together.

For these reasons, he has difficulty adjusting to life without Allison, and matters are not helped by their still-antagonistic relationship. Despite their acrimonious relationship and constant flinging of cracks at each other, Gary and Allison affectionately make up at the end of most of their conflicts, as the two seem to have a soft spot for each other underneath all their hostility.

Their teenagers are sent back and forth between them so as to spend time with each parent. Their teenage son, Tom, is a brash 14-year-old who's already had a girl in his bedroom (though at the advice of his father), has tried drinking beer, spoken to Gary as if he's Gary's father, and has even spoken to one of Gary's girlfriends (Vanessa) in a flirtatious manner. Louise, their precocious 12-year-old daughter, is an intellectual who plays the cello, keeps photos of Mahatma Gandhi, Al Gore and Che Guevara on her bedroom walls, and watches C-SPAN.

Allison considers Gary to be irresponsible in his parenting while Gary considers Allison to be boring in her parenting; this is shown whenever they pick up their kids from the other's house. In the pilot episode, Gary starts dating a young divorced mom, Vanessa Flood, while Allison reveals that she's engaged to their former marriage counselor, Dr. Walter Krandall (Ed Begley Jr.). Tom begins a romance of his own when he invites a girl over for the first time. The three couples move forward uncertainly. Vanessa, however, breaks up with Gary after a short-lived relationship because of his inability to quit worrying about Allison.

In Season 2, Gary lands an on-air job at a local sports talk radio station, and eventually starts dating the station's new, young manager, Sasha.

== History ==
The first season ran from September 24, 2008, to May 20, 2009. The series aired Wednesdays at 8:30 pm ET, following fellow CBS sitcom The New Adventures of Old Christine. They replaced the reality show Kid Nation. After an initial order of 13 episodes, CBS announced its order for seven more episodes of Gary Unmarried on November 14, 2008, calling it a full season pickup. On January 7, 2009, the show won the "Favorite New TV Comedy" award at the 35th People's Choice Awards, beating one season cancellations Kath & Kim and Worst Week. On May 10, 2009, it was announced that executive producers Yeager and Swartzlander had left the series over creative differences.

On May 19, 2009, it was announced that Gary Unmarried was officially picked up by CBS for a second season. Season 2 premiered on Wednesday, September 23, 2009, at 8:30 pm ET. It was replaced on the schedule by Accidentally on Purpose in March 2010, and was officially cancelled on May 18 of that year (alongside Accidentally on Purpose and The New Adventures of Old Christine).

== Cast and characters ==
=== Main ===
- Jay Mohr as Gary Brooks, a juvenile, wisecracking, loving, but sneaky, scheming, dishonest divorced father, who's often on some misadventure to keep out of trouble. Despite his deceptiveness and sneakiness, more often than not Gary is caught and fails miserably, resulting in him forcefully trying to justify his actions at the end of most situations. Gary enjoys drinking beer, sports, and playing games with his guy friends.
- Paula Marshall as Allison Brooks, Gary's troublemaking, cynical, sarcastic, and condescending ex-wife and Louise and Tom's mother, who once went on a trip to revisit an "old friend" that she admittedly never got along with—even forcing Gary to involve himself in it. Although generally seen behaving antagonistically and spitefully towards Gary, Allison has a tender side and is needy in terms of love, affection, and emotional support.
- Ryan Malgarini as Tom Brooks, Gary and Allison's brash teenage son who can be just as loving and caring as his mom but can also be just as witty and quick on the draw as his dad
- Laura Marano (in the pilot) and Kathryn Newton (from episode 2 onward) as Louise Brooks, Gary and Allison's sassy daughter; a straight-A student and precocious environmentalist
- Rob Riggle as Mitch Brooks, Gary's half-brother, a former Marine coming back to the United States. He lives in Gary's house, bunking in his nephew's room. He also works with Gary as a house painter.
- Jaime King as Vanessa Flood (season 1), Gary's first post-divorce understanding, affable girlfriend, whom he has a lot in common with and met when his company painted her condo. Much like Gary, she has a child from a previous marriage and has a negative relationship with her ex-husband. Though Vanessa is good-humored for the most part, she isn't the easiest person to get along with when discussing her ex-husband and once almost got into a quarrel with Allison, but Gary broke it up out of concern that Allison would hurt Vanessa.
- Ed Begley Jr. as Dr. Walter Krandall (season 1), a nerdy, instructive psychiatrist and former marriage counselor to Gary and Allison. He and Allison were engaged, but broke up before getting married. He's fifteen years older than Allison, which Gary doesn't hesitate to make insults about.
- Al Madrigal as Dennis Lopez (season 1), Gary's witty best friend and coworker
- Keegan-Michael Key as Curtis (season 2), an old friend of Gary who works at a radio station
- Brooke D'Orsay as Sasha (season 2), the young, gorgeous, overwhelmed radio station manager

== Notable guest stars ==
- David Denman as Mitch / Ronnie, Vanessa's husband whom she has a very contentious relationship with. In episode 6 ("Gary Meets The Gang"), Mitch unwelcomely shows up at the restaurant where Vanessa works. Unaware that it was Vanessa's ex-husband, Gary befriends him. Later on in the episode, Mitch treacherously reveals to Vanessa all the comments Gary made about wishing to play the field despite the fact that he knew Gary was dating Vanessa.
- Charles Henry Wyson as Parker Flood, Vanessa's violent only son with her ex-husband, Ronnie Mitchell. Parker is first seen when Vanessa brings him over to Gary's house to use the restroom. In episode 9 ("Gary Gives Thanks") Parker persistently assaults Tom despite being younger and much smaller than Tom is.
- Max Gail as Jack Brooks, Gary's eccentric father, who visited him for Thanksgiving. He was lured away by Allison to celebrate Thanksgiving over at her place, in effect causing a lot of chaos.
- Kathleen Rose Perkins as Joan Plummer, Louise's favorite teacher who Gary dates after his relationship with Vanessa ends. Gary was originally attracted to Joan's teaching assistant, rather than Joan. To prove to Louise that he wasn't shallow, Gary asked Joan out, discovered that her dowdy clothing hid her attractiveness, but was confronted by Joan, who revealed that she knew Gary was originally interested in the assistant and not her. They eventually dated, however Joan was reluctant to pursue the physical aspect of their relationship.
- Martin Mull as Charlie, Allison's discontented, henpecked, fun-loving father. Charlie is a man who's kept from many of his desires because of his wife. He is first seen on Thanksgiving as well. In retaliation for Allison luring Gary's father to her house, Gary lured Charlie to spend Thanksgiving over at his house. Charlie reveled in the freedom he had away from his wife, Connie. Charlie doesn't hesitate to show his dislike for Allison's fiancé Walter. His nickname for Allison is "Alligator".
- Senyo Amoaku as Ira, a bouncer at Vanessa's work
- Joe Torre stars as himself in an episode. Torre visits Gary at the station and gets attacked twice by Gary's brother.

== Episodes ==
Season	Episodes	Originally released	
Season	Episodes	First released	Last released
1	20	September 24, 2008	May 20, 2009
2	17	September 23, 2009	March 17, 2010

== U.S. ratings ==
Ratings based on Live+Same Day.

=== Seasonal ratings ===
Season	TV Season	Season Premiere	Season Finale	Rank	Viewers (in millions)
1	2008–2009	September 24, 2008	May 20, 2009	#74	7.2
2	2009–2010	September 23, 2009	March 17, 2010	#72	6.65

=== Season 1: 2008-2009 weekly ratings ===
#	Episode	Air Date	Timeslot	18-49	Viewers
1	Pilot	September 24, 2008	Wednesday 8:30 pm	2.3/6	6.84
2	Gary Gets Boundaries	October 1, 2008	Wednesday 8:30 pm	2.2/6	6.97
3	Gary Marries off His Ex	October 8, 2008	Wednesday 8:30 pm	2.2/6	7.43
4	Gary Gets His Stuff Back	October 15, 2008	Wednesday 8:30 pm	2.4/7	7.71
5	Gary Breaks Up His Ex-wife and Girlfriend	October 22, 2008	Wednesday 8:30 pm	2.5/7	7.85
6	Gary Meets The Gang	November 5, 2008	Wednesday 8:30 pm	2.1/6	6.44
7	Gary and Allison's Restaurant	November 12, 2008	Wednesday 8:30 pm	2.1/5	6.71
8	Gary and Allison Brooks	November 19, 2008	Wednesday 8:30 pm	2.7/7	8.14
9	Gary Gives Thanks	November 26, 2008	Wednesday 8:30 pm	2.2/7	7.72
10	Gary Goes First	December 10, 2008	Wednesday 8:30 pm	2.4/7	8.03
11	Gary Toughens Up Tom	December 17, 2008	Wednesday 8:30 pm	2.3/7	7.55
12	Gary Dates Louise's Teacher	January 14, 2009	Wednesday 8:30 pm	2.1/5	7.07
13	Gary Moves Back In	January 21, 2009	Wednesday 8:30 pm	2.2/5	7.07
14	Gary and Dennis' Sister	February 11, 2009	Wednesday 8:30 pm	2.1/5	6.86
15	Gary's Ex-Brother-In-Law	February 18, 2009	Wednesday 8:30 pm	2.1/5	7.26
16	Gary Uses His Veto	March 11, 2009	Wednesday 8:30 pm	2.3/7	7.71
17	Gary Hooks Up Allison	March 18, 2009	Wednesday 8:30 pm	2.3/7	7.57
18	Gary and the Trophy	April 8, 2009	Wednesday 8:30 pm	2.2/7	7.30
19	Gary and His Half Brother	May 6, 2009	Wednesday 8:30 pm	2.0/6	6.66
20	Gary Fixes Allison's Garbage Disposal	May 20, 2009	Wednesday 8:30 pm	1.7/5	5.55

=== Season 2: 2009-2010 weekly ratings ===
#	Episode	Air Date	Timeslot	18-49	Viewers
21	Gary Has a Dream	September 23, 2009	Wednesday 8:30 pm	2.4/7	7.37
22	Gary Promises Too Much	September 30, 2009	Wednesday 8:30 pm	2.3/7	7.08
23	Gary's Demo	October 7, 2009	Wednesday 8:30 pm	2.2/6	7.17
24	Gary Shoots Fish in a Barrel	October 14, 2009	Wednesday 8:30 pm	2.4/7	7.38
25	Gary on the Air	October 21, 2009	Wednesday 8:30 pm	2.2/6	6.76
26	Gary Tries to Do It All	November 4, 2009	Wednesday 8:30 pm	2.0/5	6.29
27	Gary and Allison's Friend	November 11, 2009	Wednesday 8:30 pm	2.4/6	7.30
28	Gary Apologizes	November 18, 2009	Wednesday 8:30 pm	2.4/7	7.00
29	Gary Keeps a Secret	November 25, 2009	Wednesday 8:30 pm	1.8/6	6.68
30	Gary Gives Sasha His Full Attention	December 9, 2009	Wednesday 8:30 pm	2.3/6	7.01
31	Gary Is a Boat Guy	December 16, 2009	Wednesday 8:30 pm	2.5/7	7.76
32	Gary Feels Tom Slipping Away	January 13, 2010	Wednesday 8:30 pm	1.9/5	5.59
33	Gary Has to Choose	January 20, 2010	Wednesday 8:30 pm	1.8/5	5.89
34	Gary Lowers the Bar	February 10, 2010	Wednesday 8:30 pm	2.4/7	7.49
35	Gary's Big Mouth	March 3, 2010	Wednesday 8:30 pm	2.0/5	6.02
36	Gary Tries to Find Something for Mitch	March 10, 2010	Wednesday 8:30 pm	2.2/7	6.83
37	Gary Unmarried?	March 17, 2010	Wednesday 8:30 pm	1.8/5	5.70

== DVD release ==
On February 9, 2010, Walt Disney Studios Home Entertainment (using the ABC Studios brand) released the complete first season of Gary Unmarried on DVD in Region 1.

== International distribution ==
Country	TV Network(s)	Series Premiere	Weekly schedule (local time)	As
United States	CBS	September 24, 2008	Wednesday 8:30 pm	
Brazil	Sony Entertainment Television	October 9, 2010	Saturday 4:30 pm	
Canada	CTV	January 3, 2009	Monday 8:30 pm	
Croatia	Fox Life		Monday to Friday 12.40- 13.05, Monday to Friday 20.15-20.50	Rastavljeni Gary
Ireland	RTÉ Two	May 23, 2011	Monday 8:30 pm	
(Arab League) Arab World	Fox Series	September, 2009/January 23, 2009	Saturday 9:30 pm/Tuesday 8:00 pm	
Germany	Comedy Central	October 6, 2009	TBA	
Netherlands	Veronica	January 5, 2009	Monday-Friday 7:30 pm	
Poland	Comedy Central	Fall 2009	TBA	Rozwodnik Gary (Gary divorcée)
Sweden	Kanal 5	March 5, 2009	Thursday 8:00 pm	Gary
Norway	TVNorge	January 11, 2010	Monday 10:00 pm	Lykkelig skilt (Happily divorced)
Turkey	ComedyMax	August 21, 2009	Monday 8:00 pm	
Italy	Fox, Italia 1	June 17, 2009	Wednesday 9:50 pm	Provaci ancora, Gary! (Try again, Gary!)
South Africa	M-Net	January 2009	Tuesday 7:00 pm	
New Zealand	TV 2	August 21, 2009	Friday 8:00 pm	
Australia	Seven Network	September 3, 2009	Tues/Thurs 7:30 pm	
Portugal	RTP2, Fox Life	October 19, 2009, June 9, 2010	Monday 8:45 pm, Monday-Friday 5:05 pm	
Estonia	Fox Life	January 12, 2010	Wed 9:50 pm	
Latvia	Fox Life	January 12, 2010	Wed 9:50 pm	
Denmark	Kanal 5	March 16, 2010	Tuesday 9:55 pm	
Hungary	Viasat 3	Spring 2010	TBA	Elvált Gary
Austria	ORF 1	March 13, 2010	Saturday 4:30 pm	
Serbia	RTS 1, Fox Life	November 2010, June 2011	Monday-Friday 11:00 pm, Monday-Friday 3:00 pm	Разведени Гари
Indonesia	Star World	July 2012	Monday-Friday 7:00 am IWT	
Bulgaria	Fox Life	July 3, 2010	All Weekdays 15:50 Two Episodes	Разведен (Divorced)
India	Zee Café		Monday-Friday 9:00 pm	

== Awards and nominations ==
- 2009 - People's Choice Awards - Favorite New Comedy - Won
- 2010 - Young Artist Award for Best Performance in a TV Series (Comedy or Drama) Supporting Young Actor-Ryan Malgarini-Won
- 2010 - Young Artist Award for Best Performance in a TV Series (Comedy or Drama) Supporting Young Actress-Kathryn Newton-Won
