= List of Gary Unmarried episodes =

The following is a list of episodes of the television series Gary Unmarried, which originally ran on CBS from September 24, 2008, to March 17, 2010.

A total of 37 episodes of Gary Unmarried have been produced over two seasons.

== Series overview ==
Season	Episodes	Originally released	
Season	Episodes	First released	Last released
1	20	September 24, 2008	May 20, 2009
2	17	September 23, 2009	March 17, 2010

== Episodes ==
=== Season 1 (2008–09) ===
No. overall	No. in season	Title	Directed by	Written by	Original release date	Prod. code	U.S. viewers (millions)
1	1	"Pilot"	Ted Wass	Ed Yeager	September 24, 2008	101	6.84
Painting contractor Gary (Jay Mohr) and his ex-wife (Paula Marshall) navigate kids and new relationships in this comedy, which opens with Allison announcing she is remarrying and Gary getting involved with a client who isn't convinced that he's ready to start dating again.
2	2	"Gary Gets Boundaries"	James Burrows	Ed Yeager	October 1, 2008	102	6.97
When Gary changes clothes in front of Allison, they realize that they are acting the same way they did when they were married. They decide that they need to create some new boundaries in their relationship in order to hold onto their new relationships.
3	3	"Gary Marries off His Ex"	James Burrows	Janae Bakken	October 8, 2008	103	7.43
Gary realises that if he can stop paying spousal support, he can afford much that previously couldn't. He goes about trying to encourage Dr. Krandall to set a date which has implications for his own relationship...
4	4	"Gary Gets His Stuff Back"	James Burrows	Matt Goldman	October 15, 2008	104	7.71
Gary wants his most prized possessions back but Allison isn't budging on anything. When he finds some risque photographs Allison once gave to him, she has no choice but to let him have his pool table so the photos don't get leaked online.
5	5	"Gary Breaks Up His Ex-wife and Girlfriend"	James Burrows	Ira Ungerleider	October 22, 2008	105	7.85
When Allison and Vanessa start becoming good friends, Gary tries to break them up so Allison doesn't taint Vanessa's impression of him with stories he'd rather keep in the past.
6	6	"Gary Meets The Gang"	James Burrows	Susan McMartin	November 5, 2008	106	6.44
Gary decides it's time to get to know Vanessa's friends after Allison throws a party to meet all of Krandell's friends. They both fear that their first impressions didn't go over as well as they could have done and seek refuge with each other, making them realise things need to change.
7	7	"Gary and Allison's Restaurant"	James Burrows	Bill Daly	November 12, 2008	107	6.71
Gary takes Vanessa out on a real date to a special restaurant after she complains that Allison is a constant presence in their lives. He finds out that it is the same one he and Allison used to go to on a regular basis and when Allison turns up he needs to keep her away from Vanessa.
8	8	"Gary and Allison Brooks"	James Burrows	Ed Brown and Scott Parkin	November 19, 2008	108	8.14
Gary and Allison pretend that they are still married when attending their friend's vow renewal ceremony, after much begging from Allison. However, Gary has a hard time following through once he gets there after he is tempted by a beautiful new divorcee.
9	9	"Gary Gives Thanks"	James Burrows	Mark Gross	November 26, 2008	109	7.72
Gary and Allison butt heads over where to host Thanksgiving. Allison tries to have everyone over her house including her parents, whereas Gary wants to have everyone at his house for his first Thanksgiving as a single dad.
10	10	"Gary Goes First"	James Burrows	Julie Bean	December 10, 2008	110	8.03
When Gary discovers that Allison is going to take the kids to their first concert, a not-so-friendly competition kicks off. Gary tries to out-do Allison by exposing the kids to other first experiences, such as Tommy's first shave and buying Louise her first bra.
11	11	"Gary Toughens Up Tom"	James Burrows	Ric Swartzlander	December 17, 2008	111	7.55
Gary decides to create a new bond with his son after seeing Krandall getting on so well with Tom.
12	12	"Gary Dates Louise's Teacher"	James Burrows	Barry Langer	January 14, 2009	112	7.07
Gary decides to prove men don't only want to date pretty women by dating Louise's regular looking teacher.
13	13	"Gary Moves Back In"	James Burrows	Bill Daly and Mark Gross	January 21, 2009	113	7.07
After Allison accidentally floods the first floor of Gary's house, she allows him to temporarily move back in with her.
14	14	"Gary and Dennis' Sister"	James Burrows	Julie Bean and Susan McMartin	February 11, 2009	114	6.86
Gary starts to panic after he and Dennis' sister start to spend much time together, and share a brief kiss, which prompts her to start to smother Gary and Dennis to start talking about the two of them getting married.
15	15	"Gary's Ex-Brother-In-Law"	James Burrows	Mark Jordan Legan and Terry Mulroy	February 18, 2009	115	8.15
Gary learns a lesson about never mixing family with business when he gets faced with an audit from the IRS and needs to lean on Allison's brother for financial support.
16	16	"Gary Uses His Veto"	James Burrows	Jana Hunter and Mitch Hunter	March 11, 2009	116	8.82
Much to Allison's anger, Gary uses his 'veto', that he and Allison get to use once a year, to stop Louise from taking Chinese lessons because he feels she has to many extracurricular activities. But when Gary signs Louise up for golf lessons, Allison ends up using her veto.
17	17	"Gary Hooks Up Allison"	James Burrows	Ira Ungerleider	March 18, 2009	117	7.57
Gary, annoyed with how much time Allison is spending with him at his house after breaking up with Krandall, plays match-maker and tries to find her a new boyfriend.
18	18	"Gary and the Trophy"	James Burrows	Rob DesHotel	April 8, 2009	118	7.30
When Gary's bowling team makes the championship, he tries to motivate them. But when one player quits the team right before the championship game, Gary struggles to find a replacement.
19	19	"Gary and His Half Brother"	James Burrows	Scott Parkin and Ed Brown	May 6, 2009	119	6.66
Gary is forced to become the adult when his half-brother Mitch moves in with him after returning from the war and causes him to lose control of the kids and the house.
20	10	"Gary Fixes Allison's Garbage Disposal"	James Burrows	Ed Yeager and Ric Swartzlander	May 20, 2009	120	5.55
When Gary fixes Allison's garbage disposal, he and Allison find each other in the bedroom repeatedly.

=== Season 2 (2009–10) ===
No. overall	No. in season	Title	Directed by	Written by	Original release date	Prod. code	U.S. viewers (millions)
21	1	"Gary Has A Dream"	James Burrows	Mark Gross	September 23, 2009	201	7.37
Gary decides to call up his old friend Curtis who works at a local radio station, and is thrilled that he is offered a job, thinking he is going to become the next sports newscaster. Allison asks Gary to set a better example for the kids when Tom is happy with his low scores on a career aptitude test. Louise is escorted to her first dance class by Gary's brother Mitch.
22	2	"Gary Promises Too Much"	James Burrows	Sally Bradford	September 30, 2009	203	7.08
When Allison's new boyfriend Howard, who happens to be very wealthy, offers to take Louise and her friends to New York for her birthday, Gary gets in over his head and promises Louise an unrealistic gift.
23	3	"Gary's Demo"	James Burrows	Wil Calhoun	October 7, 2009	202	7.17
Gary tries to get Sasha to listen to his demo tape in the hopes she will let him become the new sportscaster. Meanwhile, Louise protects Tom from a school bully.
24	4	"Gary Shoots Fish in a Barrel"	James Burrows	Ira Ungerleider	October 14, 2009	204	7.38
Gary, Curtis and Mitch decide to have a boy's night out and go to a single's club. While there, Gary is determined to prove to his friends that he can handle a one night stand without getting attached
25	5	"Gary on the Air"	James Burrows	Rob Deshotel	October 21, 2009	205	7.12
When the radio station's sportscaster is arrested, Sasha needs to replace him and give Gary his radio debut. Meanwhile, Louise makes a video of well-wishes for Uncle Mitch and his Marine Corps unit as a part of her schools volunteer week.
26	6	"Gary Tries To Do It All"	James Burrows	Bill Daly	November 4, 2009	206	6.29
Gary finds out that dealing with two careers and two kids is harder to do than he thought it would be.
27	7	"Gary and Allison's Friend"	James Burrows	Julie Bean	November 11, 2009	207	7.70
Allison gets upset when her new friend Sophia prefers spending time with Gary than her.
28	8	"Gary Apologizes"	James Burrows	Jill Cargerman	November 18, 2009	208	7.17
Gary has to put his tail between his legs and go running to Allison, after he fails to properly prepare Thanksgiving dinner for his family and friends.
29	9	"Gary Keeps a Secret"	James Burrows	Brian Keith Etheridge	November 25, 2009	209	6.80
Gary's hands are full when he allows Louise to attend a party with the "popular" kids at the skate ranch and is keeping it a secret from Allison. Meanwhile, Allison grounds Tom for using profane language. Sasha decides to go shopping with Gary when Louise asks for clothes.
30	10	"Gary Gives Sasha His Full Attention"	James Burrows	Mark Gross	December 9, 2009	210	7.16
Sasha wonders whether dating a married man is worth the hassle, after Allison gets in the way on their date.
31	11	"Gary Is A Boat Guy"	James Burrows	Wil Calhoun	December 16, 2009	212	7.92
Gary helps Tom impress a girl by buying a boat. He begrudgingly has to go to Allison's boyfriend for help when it doesn't go as he had planned.
32	12	"Gary Feels Tom Slipping Away"	James Burrows	Kevin Lappin	January 13, 2010	211	5.80
Tom begins mixing with people Gary and Allison don't approve of, so naturally they have to pry into his life. Sasha becomes fond of pro surfer Laird Hamilton.
33	13	"Gary Has To Choose"	James Burrows	Sally Bradford	January 20, 2010	213	5.89
Allison teaches Tom a life lesson about being responsible, and Gary and Sasha get more serious so Gary worries about the repercussions of dating his boss.
34	14	"Gary Lowers the Bar"	James Burrows	Jill Cargerman	February 10, 2010	214	7.50
After receiving a great Valentine's Day gift from Sasha, Gary tries to top his gift for her. Meanwhile, Allison tries, and fails, to bond with Louise and Tom.
35	15	"Gary's Big Mouth"	James Burrows	Bill Daly	March 3, 2010	215	6.02
Gary turns to wrestling in order to settle a feud between him and the wrestling coach, after he fails to help Tom make the team.
36	16	"Gary Tries to Find Something for Mitch"	James Burrows	Sam Johnson	March 10, 2010	216	6.83
When Mitch returns home from overseas, Gary tries to help him figure out what he'll do for a living. Meanwhile, Curtis and Charleen hire Allison as their wedding planner.
37	17	"Gary Unmarried?"	James Burrows	Rob DesHotel and Ira Ungerleider	March 17, 2010	217	5.70
When Gary finds out that he and Allison's divorce papers were never filed, he uses the information to manipulate her into giving him his stuff back. Meanwhile, Allison's sister Rachael comes to town and gives Mitch a makeover.

== Ratings ==
Gary Unmarried : U.S. viewers per episode (millions)

Season	Episode number																			
Season	1	2	3	4	5	6	7	8	9	10	11	12	13	14	15	16	17	18	19	20
1	6.84	6.97	7.43	7.71	7.85	6.44	6.71	8.14	7.72	8.03	7.55	7.07	7.07	6.86	8.15	8.82	7.57	7.30	6.66	5.55
2	7.37	7.08	7.17	7.38	7.12	6.29	7.70	7.17	6.80	7.16	7.92	5.80	5.89	7.50	6.02	6.83	5.70	–		

Audience measurement performed by Nielsen Media Research
