= List of Less Than Perfect episodes =

Less than Perfect is an American sitcom created by Terri Minsky. It was produced by Wass/Stein Productions and Touchstone Television for ABC. The series follows Claude Casey (Sara Rue), a temp, currently working in the supply room of television network GNB, with her quirky friends Ramona Platt (Sherri Shepherd) and Owen Kronsky (Andy Dick), before she is suddenly summoned to the twenty-second floor and appointed the executive assistant of news anchor Will Butler (Eric Roberts), much to the disapproval of her new co-workers, the snobbish Lydia Weston (Andrea Parker) and Kip Steadman (Zachary Levi). Will Sasso and Patrick Warburton additionally join the cast as Carl Monari, Claude's neighbor and cafeteria manager of GNB, and Jeb Denton, Will's co-anchor, respectively.

Less than Perfect consists of 81 episodes over four seasons. The majority aired between October 1, 2002, and June 6, 2006 on ABC, before the series was cancelled; however, eight episodes remained unaired before they were shown on Lifetime in 2009.

== Series overview ==
Season	Episodes	Originally released	
Season	Episodes	First released	Last released
1	22	October 1, 2002	May 20, 2003
2	24	September 23, 2003	May 18, 2004
3	22	September 24, 2004	April 15, 2005
4	13 (Note: 8 episodes remained unaired until syndication on Lifetime)	April 18, 2006	June 6, 2006 (Note: The date of ABC's final airing)

== Episodes ==
=== Season 1 (2002–03) ===
No. overall	No. in season	Title	Directed by	Written by	Original release date	Prod. code	Viewers (millions)
1	1	"Pilot"	Ted Wass	Terri Minsky	October 1, 2002	542-N	10.37
Claude's dream comes true when she moves up from temp to a permanent position as the assistant to news anchor, Will Butler. But all is not quite as she had imagined when she realizes that her new co-workers, Kipp and Lydia, will stop at nothing to sabotage her. Meanwhile Claude's trusty friends, Ramona and Owen, begrudgingly help her transition from the comfort and safety of the fourth floor to the battlefield that is the 22nd floor.
2	2	"Ice Cream With Lydia"	Ted Wass	Christine Zander	October 8, 2002	L212	9.60
When Claude is unexpectedly asked out for dinner with Will, she quickly cancels her double-date plan with Ramona. But when the "date" turns out to be less of one than she anticipated, Claude finds solace in the company of Lydia – who assumes that Claude slept with Will. Meanwhile, Owen tries to assert authority over Kipp when the two feud over an expensive pen.
3	3	"Claude the Liar"	Ted Wass	J.J. Wall	October 15, 2002	L213	8.90
When Claude is forced to lie for Will, she finds it difficult; but after some mentoring from Kipp, she becomes a pro at it. However, she finds herself struggling with morality issues associated with the lies. Meanwhile, the employees attend a company-wide meeting where they have to pick a "floor buddy" – Lydia gets paired with Owen, and Kipp with Ramona.
4	4	"Queen of England"	Ted Wass	Justin Adler	October 22, 2002	L211	9.32
Claude is showered with gifts as Will's new assistant, leaving Kipp and Lydia filled with envy. Kipp deceives Claude by telling her that Will is not fond of her lowly 4th floor buddies, Owen and Ramona, and then Claude inadvertently offends them by saying they cannot visit her on the 22nd floor anymore.
5	5	"The Vacation"	Ted Wass	Tom Hertz	October 29, 2002	L215	9.45
Claude loves her job so much she doesn't want to use her vacation days. After reluctantly agreeing to take a vacation, she feels threatened by Luke, the popular temp who fills in for her.
6	6	"The Pole"	Ted Wass	Cynthia Greenburg	November 5, 2002	L214	7.06
Claude is unable to compete with Lydia for Will's attention, so Ramona drags her to a Strippercize class to help her gain confidence. Meanwhile, Kipp is unhappy with his I.D. photo and convinces Owen to return to his former job as an I.D. photographer.
7	7	"Future Shock"	Ted Wass	Mike Dieffenbach	November 12, 2002	L217	8.61
After having to deal with a bitter, hardened assistant named Roz, Claude worries she will end up the same way if she doesn't doesn't get a life outside of the office.
8	8	"Meet the Folks"	Ted Wass	Terri Minsky	November 19, 2002	L219	8.23
Claude's caught in the middle when her well-meaning, but overprotective parents (Martin Mull and Cindy Williams) come for a visit, and Will backs out of a dinner engagement with them. Meanwhile, Kipp begins losing his edge at work when he becomes smitten with a journalism student.
9	9	"Claude the Heartbreaker"	Ted Wass	Christine Zander	November 26, 2002	L221	9.96
While awaiting a second date with Charlie, Claude accepts a date with Will's godson Oliver (Aaron Buerge). Meanwhile, Kipp uses the son of the network president to get a promotion.
10	10	"One Office Party Too Many"	Ted Wass	Cynthia Greenburg	December 10, 2002	L218	9.06
Everyone arrives at the Christmas party with an agenda... that none of them are able to fulfill.
11	11	"A Claude Casey in Production"	Ted Wass	F.J. Pratt & Dan Cohen	December 17, 2002	L216	8.79
Claude tries to make nice with Kipp by producing a demo of him showing off his anchorman capabilities. However, Claude finds the demo disastrous, and tries to keep Kipp from finding out. Meanwhile, Lydia desperately tries to remind Will of the anniversary of their fling; and Owen becomes addicted to Dr. Phil.
12	12	"Claude's Got a Secret"	Ted Wass	Terri Minsky & Claudia Lonow	January 7, 2003	L223	8.05
As Claude and Charlie try to keep their relationship a secret, Owen and Ramona try to find out what her secret is. Lydia asks big-shot Norma Craft (Joanna Cassidy) to be her mentor, but only succeeds in becoming her confidant. Jealous over Lydia's newfound mentor, Kipp asks Will to be his mentor.
13	13	"Telephone"	Ted Wass	Justin Adler	January 21, 2003	L220	7.68
Will leaves his apartment in the care of Claude as he goes out of town, and encourages to invite her friends over; unfortunately, Lydia and Kipp – who steals a story idea Claude was going to pitch to Will – also invite themselves over. Lydia discovers Will dumped a crystal gazelle that she gave to him during their brief fling into his fish tank and spends the whole evening obsessed with trying to get it out of there. While snooping through Will's "booty-call phone", Kipp discovers his mother has been sleeping with Will.
14	14	"High Maintenance"	Ted Wass	David Blum & Stacy Kramer	February 4, 2003	L225	8.50
Will's new girlfriend Dani (Jenny McCarthy) insists on having Claude run errands for her, Ramona and Owen convince Claude to put her feet down and stop being a pushover. When she finally confronts her, Dani forces him to choose her and Claude, with Claude winning out. When Will becomes depressed following their break-up, Claude has to swallow her pride and convince Dani to reconcile with him. Meanwhile, Lydia and Kipp start sucking up to Ramona and Owen when they find out they have access to the VIP area at an important party.
15	15	"Valentine's Day"	Terry Hughes	Tom Hertz	February 11, 2003	L226	7.99
On Valentine's Day, Lydia is jealous of Claude when Charlie sends a dozen roses to her while on a road trip with his father. The next morning, two dozen roses mysteriously appear on Lydia's desk, and she tries to discover who her secret admirer is. Meanwhile, Owen is seduced by Deirdre (Nicole Sullivan) who only wants him as a sperm donor, leaving Claude and Ramona the mission of opening his eyes to not let a child be raised without a father; and Claude embarrasses herself when Will overhears her talking dirty on the phone with Charlie.
16	16	"Breaking Up"	Ted Wass	Cynthia Greenburg	February 18, 2003	L228	8.23
After breaking up with Charlie, Claude gets sucked into escorting Will's fiancé, Dani, to a bridal shop. When Claude has a meltdown in the dressing room, Ramona orchestrates an impromptu break-up/slumber party, led by Lydia. Meanwhile, Owen and Carl scheme to crash the slumber party from across the hall; and Kipp tries to ghostwrite Will's autobiography, but Will can't seem to come up with any useful stories.
17	17	"Picture Perfect Party"	Terry Hughes	Dan Cohen & F.J. Pratt	March 11, 2003	L227	6.63
In celebration of two years in New York, Claude decides to throw a party at her place. But when Will says he'll go (a direct result from his publicist's attempt to popularize his image), she changes her party from casual to fancy. The only thing she wasn't counting on was Will showing up in casual clothes and turning her party into exactly what she wanted to avoid. In the end, Ramona questions Claude about the reasons of her sadness, and shows her that even though her party might not be the fanciest, people sure are having fun.
18	18	"The New Guy"	Ted Wass	Tom Hertz	March 18, 2003	L222	6.04
Will's contract is up for renewal just as the head of the network arrives, flaunting a new anchor (Bob Odenkirk). Fearing that Will's job is in jeopardy and they'll be replaced, the staff bands together to pull of "The Gum Caper" to ensure Will a new contract.
19	19	"Oh Papa"	Ted Wass	Tom Hertz	April 29, 2003	L231	6.54
After Owen learns that Deirdre is pregnant, Claude tries to arrange a get-together between Owen and his sperm donor father (Barry Bostwick). Feeling self-conscious after seeing a bad picture in the newspaper, Will recruits Lydia to give him a makeover, and Kipp develops a gimmick to get noticed at the office.
20	20	"A Little Love for Lydia"	Ted Wass	J.J. Wall	May 6, 2003	L224	8.39
Claude is caught in the middle when her charming older brother Bobby (Richard Ruccolo) accapts a date with Lydia.
21	21	"Save the Squirrel, But Bet the Over/Under"	Ted Wass	J.J. Wall	May 13, 2003	L229	7.79
Will is asked to host a benefit dinner and chooses a squirrel clinic as the charity, which makes Claude's job of selling tables to the event a difficult one. Carl gets Owen hooked on gambling, and in trouble with a bookie. Lydia and Kipp use Will's name for their own benefit.
22	22	"The Umbrella"	Ted Wass	Justin Adler	May 20, 2003	L230	8.79
New executive producer Ted Elliot (Michael Boatman) is brought into GNB to shake things up. When he offers her with a job amidst the uncertainty, Claude is forced to question her future working for Will.

=== Season 2 (2003–04) ===
No. overall	No. in season	Title	Directed by	Written by	Original release date	Prod. code	Viewers (millions)
23	1	"Choices"	Ted Wass	Justin Adler	September 23, 2003	202	8.90
At Will's urging, Claude takes a job as Mr. Elliot's assistant, leaving her position to be filled by Kipp — who Will can't stand. Meanwhile, Lydia unsuccessfully tries to impress Mr. Elliot; Ramona and Owen fight over a lunchroom meal plan; and Carl hangs around the office after locking himself out of his apartment.
24	2	"From the Office of Will Butler"	Ted Wass	Rob LaZebnik	September 30, 2003	204	10.16
When the video store that Carl works for goes out of business, Claude agrees to turn in an application for him at GNB. She types his resume on stationery that reads, "From the Office of Will Butler," so his application is rushed through and Carl receives a job as the cafeteria manager. However, Claude fears his performance will reflect badly on her. Meanwhile, Kipp's plan to climb up the corporation pyramid backfires when his elderly target ends up wanting him for sexual purposes.
25	3	"It Takes a Pillage"	Ted Wass	J.J. Wall	October 7, 2003	203	9.96
When Claude's apartment is robbed, she decides to call a neighbor meeting and organize her building into a more friendly community. Her good intentions soon turn into an excuse for all neighbors to use her to run their errands. Finally, Claude decides that the building doesn't have to function as a small town and stands up for her freedom, even if it means telling Ramona and Owen that she doesn't want them living there anymore. Meanwhile, Lydia flirts with the new political pundit, Jeb Denton (Patrick Warburton).
26	4	"New York Evening"	Ted Wass	Cynthia Greenburg	October 14, 2003	206	8.53
Claude finds an invitation for a Vogue retrospective at the Guggenheim museum in Will's junk mail, and decides to take Ramona and Owen with her on a glamorous New York evening. But their plans hit a snag when Claude makes the last-minute decision to invite Carl. Meanwhile, Kipp makes a list of his ideal mate's qualities, which he leaves on Lydia's desk – but Jeb finds it and assumes it's Lydia's.
27	5	"Shampoo"	Ted Wass	Terri Minsky	October 21, 2003	201	8.29
Claude uses her high school's website to hook up with a down-on-his-luck former classmate and the sparks instantly fly – until Claude discovers that he's better off than she realized. Meanwhile, Kipp and Lydia fight to get a $100 bottle of shampoo, and Carl gets his feelings hurt when he implements a suggestion box in the cafeteria.
28	6	"Rules"	Ted Wass	Justin Adler	October 28, 2003	207	9.74
When Claude meets a man in the elevator, she refuses to give him her number. So, she takes his instead. She is trying out some new dating rules and decides not to call him until the initial 48 hours are over. There's a Halloween party coming up and Claude decides to take Trevor, but unfortunately his number was in the pocket of the jacket she traded in for a party dress. They track down the new owner, but he washed away Trevor's number. Despite her lack of luck, she manages to meet another guy at the party. Meanwhile, Kipp and Lydia smuggle an illegal cheese in order to impress their superiors and earn promotions, but the cheese is eaten by Ramona, Owen and Carl.
29	7	"All About Claude"	Ted Wass	Chuck Tatham	November 4, 2003	205	11.00
Ramona is on guard when Vicki Devorski (Pamela Anderson), a former temp who stole her boyfriend, comes back to the office. Ramona jealously guards her current boyfriend so Vicki doesn't get her hooks into him. But when Ramona begins to neglect her friends, Vicki tries to make Claude her new best friend, all in an attempt to get at Ramona. Meanwhile, Owen and Carl discover their mutual obsession with catfights and hope to witness one in person.
30	8	"Roomies"	Ted Wass	Cynthia Greenburg	November 18, 2003	209	9.13
Claude and Lydia get stuck rooming together when they travel to the White House Correspondents Dinner in Washington, DC. Lydia has a lot of advice for Claude on how to conduct herself in the nation's capital, but everything changes when Lydia runs into a childhood friend who exposes her middle class background. Meanwhile, Ramona gets upset when Owen asks Carl to move into their shared office space.
31	9	"Claude's Alternative Thanksgiving"	Ted Wass	Christine Zander	November 25, 2003	210	10.24
Claude is throwing her first Thanksgiving for all her friends. Owen's two lesbian moms (Valerie Harper and Joanna Kerns) come to visit and share the holiday. The only problem is that his moms have always assumed that Owen is gay. Hoping to keep up the ruse, Owen asks his friends to play along, including asking Carl to pose as his lover. Meanwhile, Lydia and Kipp both get invited to Will's Thanksgiving party, where Kipp is briefly the star attraction.
32	10	"The Girl Next Door"	Ted Wass	Claudia Lonow	December 2, 2003	208	8.79
After Carl asks Claude out for a spontaneous dinner, the office rumor mill kicks into gear, until Claude has a talk with him about where their relationship is going. Meanwhile, Lydia enlists Ramona as her financial advisor when she gets into financial trouble; and Claude sticks Owen with watching Will's niece (Kat Dennings).
33	11	"Claude the Terminator"	Ted Wass	F.J. Pratt & Dan Cohen	December 9, 2003	211	10.62
Will tells Claude to fire his interior decorator, but Claude doesn't feel up to the task so she enlists Ramona to help... but Ramona quickly becomes drunk with power and begins going beyond the call of duty to help out Claude. Meanwhile, Owen reveals to Carl that Lydia is his ""fantasy girlfriend,"" so Carl claims her too -- and Kipp overhears their conversation.
34	12	"Santa Claude"	Ted Wass	Mike Dieffenbach	December 16, 2003	212	8.89
Claude takes on the task of personally shopping for all of Will's Christmas presents for staff and later for his girlfriend, Dani. Her efforts start to go awry when Lydia and Dani's gifts get switched, making Jeb jealous and offending Dani.
35	13	"What About That!"	Ted Wass	Chuck Tatham	January 6, 2004	214	9.33
After an altercation with the paparazzi, Will enlists Claude to write a public service announcement in hopes that it will clean up his tarnished image. Claude is ecstatic until she learns that he granted Lydia the opportunity to write one too. Meanwhile, Owen and Carl bask in the luxuries of the VIP men's washroom at GNB, but fellow trespasser Kipp tries to keep them from invading his turf.
36	14	"Two Camps"	Ted Wass	Justin Adler	January 27, 2004	215	9.79
When Kipp stirs up a competition with Claude over whether Jeb is a better boss than Will, it escalates until Kipp discovers that Jeb's job is in jeopardy. Meanwhile, Carl gets a thermostat installed in Owen and Ramona's office, which Ramona demands that Owen keeps set on high heat.... leading Owen and Carl to hatch a revenge scheme that goes awry.
37	15	"Love Stinks (Sometimes)"	Ted Wass	Dan Tobin	February 10, 2004	217	8.52
Claude sets her sights on Mitch, the new segment producer. In preparation for their date, Claude starves herself to get into a dress, but problems arise when they get to the restaurant and her drink instantly kicks in. Meanwhile, Will goes to great lengths to get Carl to trade Shaq to him in the office "fantasy basketball game," and Jeb and Lydia each try to determine if they are an exclusive couple.
38	16	"The Crush"	Ted Wass	Rob LaZebnik	February 17, 2004	216	9.38
Lydia agrees to watch Jeb's son, George, when he comes for a visit, but she quickly pawns him off on Claude. But when George develops a raging crush on Claude, Lydia fears that it will hurt her standing with Jeb. Meanwhile, Ramona finally receives her grandmother's prized tomato seeds from probate and schemes with Owen and Carl to plant them outside of Jeb's office -- but they have to contend with Kipp.
39	17	"Claude's Apartment"	Ted Wass	Mike Dieffenbach	February 24, 2004	218	8.88
Claude invites Mitch to her apartment for some dinner and romance, but her friends convince her that her décor is a bit childish. Kipp's mother, Diane (Lesley Ann Warren), steps into town to meet Will Butler for a fling of her own, and swipes one of Claude's childhood drawings to pass off as Kipp's. Meanwhile, Owen gets a motor scooter, Ramona gets tickets to a Mary J. Blige concert, and Lydia makes spa reservations for herself in Diane's name.
40	18	"22 Minus 1 Equals 4"	Skip Collector	Chuck Tatham	March 2, 2004	219	8.58
Mitch uses his power to bump Lydia off the 22nd floor to make Claude happy. Even though Lydia's transfer has made life on the 22nd floor serene, Claude tries to bring her back from the 4th floor to ease Owen and Ramon's suffering. Meanwhile, Carl is angered that they're using his cafeteria to hold a blood drive, but he changes his tune when he meets a gorgeous nurse.
41	19	"Riding in Cars With Falafel"	Jonathan Weiss	J.J. Wall	March 9, 2004	213	8.36
During a transit strike, Claude borrows Carl's beloved Buick Riviera and sets out on a quest with Ramona and Owen to find a better lunch... a quest that promptly ends when Claude wrecks the car. Meanwhile Lydia talks up Kipp in front of Jeb, who promotes Kipp to his assistant -- but Lydia fears that Kipp will reveal unflattering secrets about her.
42	20	"Dating Protocol at GNB"	Ted Wass	Cynthia Greenburg & David Metrick	March 16, 2004	220	7.37
When Mr. Schmidtline holds a "Respect in the Workplace" seminar and cracks down on office romance, Claude fears for her relationship with Mitch... so she sets up Ramona with Schmidtline. Meanwhile, Jeb recruits Carl as a sound man to capture a taped confession from Lydia that he didn't coerce her into their relationship. Kipp calls Owen ""four eyes,"" which he should come to regret when he loses a contact and is caught wearing glasses -- but Owen can't muster a clever remark.
43	21	"Arctic Nights"	Ted Wass	Robert Bruce	April 27, 2004	221	8.63
As Claude takes over editing the company newsletter due to the death of the previous one, she hires Owen to write a review comparing Carl to Eddie Smirkoff (Jim Belushi), the new sandwich guy. Meanwhile Will Butler orders her to destroy videotapes that she thinks are old pornography, but turn out to be evidence of his early career as an actor on a Canadian soap opera.
44	22	"Claude's Roxanne"	Ted Wass	Ron Lux	May 4, 2004	222	8.31
Will hires Claude's old friend, Roxanne Fiedler (Tori Spelling), as a new secretary, even though she's totally unqualified for the job. Meanwhile Kipp is assumed to be going bonkers Gaslight-style, thanks to some pranks by Carl, Owen and Ramona.
45	23	"The Pimp Hat"	Ted Wass	Cynthia Greenburg	May 11, 2004	224	6.54
Claude is heartbroken when Mitch goes on assignment to Budapest, so Owen and Carl try to lift her spirits with a game of "Pimp Hat," where everyone picks a name out of a hat and sets up a date for them. Kipp joins in the game, secretly plotting to ruin everyone's evening, and Lydia becomes jealous that she and Jeb don't have a good "first date story."
46	24	"Claude On One Knee"	Ted Wass	Christine Zander	May 18, 2004	223	9.05
In an effort to get rid of Lydia, Claude helps Jeb realize it's time to propose to Lydia so she can quit her job and stay home. Jeb agrees and enlists Claude's help in setting up a romantic night for the perfect proposal. He also assigns Kipp the task of gathering some guys to hang out with for his final hurrah after the proposal, but all Kipp manages to find are Owen & Carl.

=== Season 3 (2004–05) ===
No. overall	No. in season	Title	Directed by	Written by	Original release date	Prod. code	Viewers (millions)
47	1	"Supply Man Down"	Ted Wass	Mike Dieffenbach	September 24, 2004	303	6.56
Will is jealous of the publicity other network anchors are getting for their pro-social work, so he asks Claude to suggest a policy that can get him some positive press. Claude suggests helping the environment by adopting the "paperless office," but fails to consider how the new policy will affect Owen -- head of office supplies. Meanwhile, Kipp and Carl lose the key to Will's expensive car down an elevator shaft and must journey to the depths of the building to find it.
48	2	"Claude Wants to Know"	Ted Wass	Justin Adler	October 1, 2004	301	5.91
After Caleb (Will Friedle), a co-worker that Claude's dating, tells her he's not ready for a relationship, the very next day she and Ramona see him with another woman. Claude decides to confront Caleb to find out exactly what he didn't like about her. Meanwhile, Owen and Carl befriend Jeb by sharing with him their new hobby, the Roll-O board. And Will, who has started wearing an earring to get more publicity, has his interview with a journalist (Giuliana Depandi) interrupted by Claude's emotional crisis about her dating life.
49	3	"Ain't It a Shame, Claude?"	Ted Wass	Claudia Lonow	October 15, 2004	302	5.63
Claude plays matchmaker between Ramona and the new office hunk, Mike (Erik Palladino), but unwittingly arouses Mike's interest in her. Meanwhile Jeb and Lydia skip out on work to handle affairs that not even Kipp may know about, while Carl has notions of becoming a secret agent and, along with Kipp, puts his "spy skills" to use to uncover the truth about Jeb and Lydia's activities.
50	4	"Ignoring, Lydia"	Ted Wass	Cynthia Greenburg	October 22, 2004	304	5.84
Lydia, obsessed with planning her wedding, is driving her fiance, Jeb, crazy. Jeb decides to pay Claude to listen to Lydia discuss the wedding details so he doesn't have to, but complications result when Lydia begins to think of Claude as a real friend. Meanwhile, it turns out that the publicist assigned to promote Will's new biography, Tracy (Lucy Lawless), is an old flame, and they rekindle their romance. And Owen and Carl find that communicating through walkie talkies allows them to be more candid with each other.
51	5	"Knock, Knock Who's Dead?"	Ted Wass	Rob LaZebnik	October 29, 2004	305	5.98
Ramona and Claude stumble upon an aged co-worker who has passed on, and when no one claims his belongings, Claude resolves to find his next of kin. Ramona, for her part, seizes the opportunity to move into the former colleague's office after finding out that Lydia wants to store her wedding materials in it. But a spirit seems to haunt the office, frightening Ramona and Owen and climaxing with supernatural events on Halloween Night. Meanwhile Carl, decked out as a Musketeer, flirts with a cafeteria patron dressed as a genie, and Lydia and Jeb fight over their costumes for the company Halloween party.
52	6	"From the Chair to the Couch"	Ted Wass	F.J. Pratt & Dan Cohen	November 5, 2004	308	6.34
Will, upset about an on-air blunder during his news broadcast, blames his mistake on his faulty anchor chair. Claude has the chair checked out, learns there's nothing wrong with it, and tells him so. When Will continues to insist the chair was the problem, Claude calls him a diva. Hurt by the comment, Will sends Claude to see his therapist. Meanwhile Lydia sees Will's on-air slip as an opportunity for Jeb to step into the anchor position, and Kipp breaks up with his girlfriend, Annie, but is scared into reuniting with her after he finds a gun in her purse.
53	7	"Shoo-In"	Ted Wass	Terri Minsky	November 12, 2004	309	7.19
Claude applies for the GNB Management Training Program, assured by Ramona that she is a "shoo-in" to be selected. But when Kipp also applies for the program, it remains to be seen what will be Claude's greater obstacle to acceptance, Kipp or her own blossoming confidence. Meanwhile, Jeb learns Lydia plans to stop working once they're married, so he enlists Kipp to convince her otherwise -- but Jeb should be careful what he wishes for; and Owen and Carl conspire to make big money supplying fish to the GNB cafeteria, but their plan is endangered when Ramona becomes suspicious.
54	8	"We're Bad People"	Ted Wass	Chuck Tatham	November 19, 2004	310	6.68
When Claude and Ramona suspect Kipp is bankrolling his Lasik surgery with ill-gotten company money, they go undercover to learn the truth. Meanwhile, Lydia is shocked to learn Jeb is hiding a dirty little secret about the fancy hotel she's chosen for their romantic rendezvous, and Owen and Carl help Will train for the NYC Marathon.
55	9	"Moms the Word"	Ted Wass	Christine Zander	November 26, 2004	307	5.68
It's the day after Thanksgiving and Owen's two moms visit GNB to meet his coworkers. Judy (Joanna Kerns) helps Will with his girlfriend problems and Judith (Valerie Harper) lives vicariously through Carl and Ramona, encouraging them to indulge in her passions for gambling and drinking. Meanwhile, Claude fears losing her job when Owen reveals that she's secretly interviewing for another job, and Lydia's first Thanksgiving with Jeb's family does not go well when his grandmother kicks the bucket under mysterious circumstances.
56	10	"Claude's Romantic Hideaway"	Ted Wass	J.J. Wall	December 3, 2004	306	5.71
When Claude learns Carl's next "romantic" date with Vivian will consist of taking her out for pizza, she steps in to orchestrate a real romantic night for them. But when Vivian finds out Claude masterminded the date -- which takes place at Claude's apartment - she doesn't appreciate the interference in her budding romance with Carl. Meanwhile, jealousy rears its head when Jeb learns of Lydia's past relationship with Will, and a trivia contest brings out Owen and Ramona's competitive sides.
57	11	"Claude's 15 Minutes of Christmas"	Gary Shimokawa	Justin Adler	December 17, 2004	313	6.31
Claude is put in charge of organizing the GNB on-air holiday greeting, but is alarmed to learn that there are strict criteria to determine who can represent the company - putting her in hot water with Owen, Ramona and Carl, to whom she had promised an appearance. Meanwhile Lydia refuses to rearrange her holiday plans with Jeb when he announces they must accommodate his son, George, and Kipp and his new girlfriend, Annie, encounter holiday relationship turbulence.
58	12	"Emotions Eleven"	Ted Wass	Earl Davis	January 7, 2005	311	6.91
The crew arrives at GNB's annual retreat to discover former human resources representative Schmidtline fired up to point out all their workplace flaws. Claude struggles to lead the group in a team-building task, and when things go poorly, they decide to go AWOL. Meanwhile, Will and Jeb are left to fend for themselves in the office.
59	13	"You Can Leave the Lights On"	Ted Wass	Cynthia Greenburg	January 14, 2005	312	6.94
Claude's ex-boyfriend, Charlie, returns to GNB and they decide to give their relationship a second try. Ramona convinces Claude to buy some sexy lingerie to reignite their passion, and Claude finally feels confident enough in her own skin to wear it, but is later embarrassed when she is strip-searched at work. Meanwhile, GNB has reinstated the studio tour, putting pressure on Ramona and Owen to perform as if they had an audience; and Jeb at last seems to appreciate Kipp's work, but when he makes a terrible mistake, Lydia jumps in to help her friend.
60	14	"I Just Don't Like Her"	Jonathan Weiss	Rob LaZebnik	January 21, 2005	314	7.23
Carl's girlfriend, Viv, is friendly to everyone except Claude who, she thinks, is trying to steal Carl away from her. But when Carl breaks up with Viv for ridiculous reasons, Claude makes it her goal to get them back together. Meanwhile, Lydia convinces a restaurant to add Jeb's image on their famed wall, which forces Will off the wall.
61	15	"Playhouse"	Ted Wass	J.J. Wall	January 28, 2005	316	6.55
Claude's boyfriend Charlie temporarily moves in after his landlord pays him ten thousand dollars to move out. However, when Charlie becomes too comfortable with his new wealth and free living arrangements and begins holding auditions for his new band in her apartment, Claude questions her decision. In the meantime, Lydia wants Jeb to take dance lessons to prepare for their wedding, and Owen is the perfect teacher.
62	16	"Distractions"	Skip Collector	Mike Dieffenbach	February 4, 2005	315	7.76
Claude is excited to be starting the GNB Management Training Program with her new boyfriend, Charlie - until Kipp joins the program and befriends Charlie. Meanwhile, Owen volunteers to photograph Lydia and Jeb's wedding, but Lydia is uninterested until she sees his work up at a prominent New York art gallery. Paula Abdul guest stars as Kathleen, Will Butler's girlfriend and art gallery owner.
63	17	"Get Away"	Ted Wass	Suzie V. Freeman & Sarah Jane Cunningham	February 11, 2005	317	7.63
Will gives Claude the keys to his home in the Hamptons for a romantic weekend with Charlie, but when they arrive they're surprised to find that Lydia and Jeb had the same idea. Meanwhile Ramona makes a romantic connection with the geeky computer technician, Morpheus (Mark Curry), Carl and Kipp compete for the affection of the beautiful yet unattainable new producer, Laura (Kimberly Williams-Paisley), and Will gets a private lesson in his office from his tai chi instructor, Xin Xao Pi (Regis Philbin).
64	18	"Pre-Wedded Bliss"	Ted Wass	Emily Cutler	March 4, 2005	318	6.13
Claude steps in to help Lydia and Jeb with their pre-nup, but finds she may have opened a Pandora's Box. Owen offers to help Claude with Will's fan mail, and forges a relationship with one fan in particular, Louise. But when Louise (played by Joan Rivers) shows up at GNB to meet Will, it could be trouble for everyone. Meanwhile Ramona cooks up an internet auction scheme to get back at Kipp for insulting her.
65	19	"Claude's Extreme Makeover"	Ted Wass	Earl Davis	March 25, 2005	319	5.33
Claude wins an extreme apartment makeover by the "Extreme Makeover: Home Edition" design team at a charity auction. While designers Tracy Hutson, Michael Moloney and Paul DiMeo (guest starring as themselves) redesign the apartment, Claude has to spend the night at GNB -- where there is a surprising amount of late night activity and intrigue.
66	20	"Amicably Yours"	Ted Wass	David Metrick	April 1, 2005	320	5.58
Claude discovers that Jeb and Lydia are pretending to be romantically interested in her and Kipp, respectively, as a means of making the other jealous. Meanwhile, Carl makes a long overdue visit to a doctor, played by Star Jones Reynolds, who makes him think he has more ailments than he really does.
67	21	"Casey v. Kronsky"	Ted Wass	F.J. Pratt & Dan Cohen	April 8, 2005	321	5.01
To complete the GNB Management Training Program, Claude and Kipp must supervise a department. Claude is assigned to Supplies, where she struggles to assert her authority over hypersensitive Owen. Meanwhile Kipp is assigned to Operations, which he soon learns is the janitorial department. At first appalled at blue collar life, Kipp later embraces his new masculine side. Lydia fills in as Jeb's secretary, which proves awkward since they've broken up.
68	22	"Claude the Expert"	Ted Wass	Justin Adler	April 15, 2005	322	4.70
Claude encourages Charlie to audition for a band, but then, when he makes the cut and has to leave town indefinitely, she realizes her relationship skills are better applied to Jeb and Lydia. Meanwhile, Owen and Ramona throw a surprise birthday party for Carl, but it turns out to be a much bigger celebration than they'd expected.

=== Season 4 (2006) ===
No. overall	No. in season	Title	Directed by	Written by	Original release date	Prod. code	Viewers (millions)
69	1	"The Devil Wears Burberry, Part I"	Ted Wass	Christine Zander	April 18, 2006	401	4.51
Upon returning from vacation in Italy, Claude learns that her boss, network anchor Will Butler, has resigned, leaving her jobless. Luckily her trusty friends, Owen and Ramona, have secured her a position as a temp on the 4th floor, right back where she started three years ago. Jeb Denton, the new anchorman, has promoted his wife, Lydia, to producer, and Claude's worst nightmare comes true when she's offered a job as Lydia's assistant. She hesitantly accepts the job on condition that she be given more responsibility, but working for Lydia proves to be a dangerous bargain. Meanwhile, Owen becomes addicted to Carl's new soft serve ice cream machine.
70	2	"The Devil Wears Burberry, Part II"	Ted Wass	Rob LaZebnik	April 25, 2006	402	5.42
After quitting as Lydia's assistant, Claude is back to "floater" status. However, the only spot available is working with Lydia, so Claude reluctantly agrees to work for her, but with conditions. Lydia's first major assignment is to produce a complicated segment for the news. She pretends to have everything under control, but ends up breaking down and begging Claude for her help. Claude saves her only after she's given a raise, a promotion and an apology. Meanwhile, Ramona gets a call that she may need to quit and return to the National Guard, leaving Owen and Carl freaking out.
71	3	"A Crush Grows in Brooklyn"	Ted Wass	Claudia Lonow	May 2, 2006	403	4.98
After a long week, Claude, Carl, Ramona and Owen enjoy a night out for happy hour at their favorite bar. A little tipsy, Claude and Carl head home, and, when one thing leads to another, they end up in bed together. They decide to keep it a secret from everyone at work to protect their friendship, but their attraction to each other makes that difficult. Meanwhile, Jeb incites a power struggle between Lydia and Kipp to keep them both distracted and out of his hair.
72	4	"Why Are You Hurting Claude?"	Ted Wass	Dan Cohen & F.J. Pratt	May 30, 2006	404	4.67
Claude reveals to Ramona that she and Carl are sleeping together and asks that she keep it a secret from Owen. Owen then senses that something is going on, so he asks Carl, who reveals nothing. But later that night, Owen pays Carl a visit and ends up walking in on Claude and Carl having sex. Meanwhile, Jeb & Lydia are constantly fighting at work, and Kipp loses his trust fund and looks to Ramona to help him budget his money.
73	5	"Flirting with De-Feet"	Ted Wass	Steve Holland	June 6, 2006	405	3.97
Claude is concerned when Carl doesn't seem to be affected by her flirting with Ethan, the copy repairman. Meanwhile, Ramona finds out that Kipp is making money on the side as a foot model, and she demands to get involved. Owen takes the photos of their feet together, but when they find them online, it turns out that someone has turned their shoot into a bizarre sexual scene.
74	6	"The Owl Specialist"	Ted Wass	Mike Dieffenbach	Unaired	406	N/A
Claude attempts to protect the owls living on her apartment building's roof. When her landlord tells Carl that he's having an owl specialist come take a look at them, Claude thinks he's going to "take them away" and attempts to protect them at all costs. When Lydia asks her to dog sit, however, things do not go as planned. Meanwhile, Owen desperately searches for someone to be his emergency contact.
75	7	"Red Carpet Claude"	Ted Wass	J.J. Wall	Unaired (Note: First aired in syndication on Lifetime on June 18, 2009)	407	N/A
When Jeb is described as boring, Claude decides to get him publicity as a fun guy by getting him into an important party. When Lydia cannot go, Jeb decides to take Claude as his date as a way to thank her. At the red carpet, an uninterested Jeb leaves Claude by herself, causing her to accidentally ends up getting it herself, which angers Lydia.
76	8	"Kipp Steadman's Guide to Dating"	Sheldon Epps	Rob LaZebnik	Unaired (Note: First aired in syndication on Lifetime on June 19, 2009)	408	N/A
When Kipp loses his apartment, Carl decides to take him in. Kipp then gives Carl advice on how to date Claude, realizing he knows a lot more about her than he thought.
77	9	"Reinventing the Wheel"	Trevor Kirschner	Earl Davis	Unaired (Note: First aired in syndication on Lifetime on June 20, 2009)	409	N/A
Owen helps Claude deal with a moody Lydia and Kipp finds out that Jeb picks on him because he is a weak target. Meanwhile, Ramona and Carl learn that they might be related through marriage after Carl recognizes one of his aunts in Ramona's family reunion photos.
78	10	"And the Award Goes to"	Gil Junger	Mike Dieffenbach	Unaired (Note: First aired in syndication on Lifetime on June 20, 2009)	410	N/A
When Lydia feels she doesn't get enough recognition, Jeb and Claude come up with a plan to give her a fake award, but they soon get too over their heads when Lydia gets too excited about the award.
79	11	"I Have An Ear"	Sheldon Epps	Lew Schneider	Unaired (Note: First aired in syndication on Lifetime on June 23, 2009)	411	N/A
Claude and Kipp get into an argument when she is about to become assistant to Lydia and Jeb.
80	12	"Banished and Famished"	Skip Collector	Steve Holland	Unaired (Note: First aired in syndication on Lifetime on June 23, 2009)	412	N/A
Claude convinces Lydia to implement a set of new rules in the office to make working at GNB better for its employees, but when reading the finalized list out loud, she learns that Lydia snuck in one more rule: anyone that doesn't work on the 22nd floor is banned from eating in its lounge, thus forcing Ramona and Owen to eat in their office.
81	13	"Sex, Lies and Office Supplies"	Jonathan Weiss	Earl Davis	Unaired (Note: First aired in syndication on Lifetime on June 24, 2009)	413	N/A
Claude realizes that Lydia is about to cheat on Jeb after hearing a phone call. Apparently, Lydia and the man from London meet once a year, but Claude tries to convince Lydia to end the affair now that she's married. She later wishes she had stayed out of it when she meets the man at a hotel bar later on to end things on Lydia's behalf, as she ends up making out with the guy, despite being in a relationship with Carl.
