= ComedyMax =

- Country: Turkey
- Broadcast area: Turkey

Programming
- Picture format: 4:3 (576i, SDTV)

ComedyMax is a defunct television channel in Turkey, which broadcasts worldwide hit TV series as Turkish subtitled. It is exclusively available for Digiturk satellite package subscribers.

== List of comedy shows on ComedyMax ==
Some of the shows on ComedyMax.

- 10 Things I Hate About You
- 2 Broke Girls
- 3rd Rock from the Sun
- 30 Rock
- According to Jim
- America's Funniest Home Videos
- American Dad!
- Andy Richter Controls the Universe
- Becker
- The Big Bang Theory
- Big Day
- Boy Meets World
- Californication
- Caroline in the City
- Carpoolers
- Cavemen
- Center of the Universe
- Chappelle's Show
- Clueless
- Comedy Central Presents
- Committed
- Complete Savages
- Cosby
- The Cosby Show
- Chappelle's Show
- Cougar Town
- Courting Alex
- Crumbs
- Curb Your Enthusiasm
- Dave's World
- Dilbert
- Dream On
- Drew Carey Show
- Ellen
- Entourage
- Everybody Hates Chris
- Everybody Loves Raymond
- For Your Love
- Frasier
- Freddie
- Friends
- The Game
- Gary Unmarried
- Greetings from Tucson
- Grounded for Life
- Home Improvement
- Hope & Faith
- I'm With Her
- In Case of Emergency
- In-Laws
- Ink
- It's All Relative
- Jake in Progress
- Just Shoot Me!
- Keen Eddie
- King of the Hill
- The King of Queens
- The Knights of Prosperity
- Kristin
- Ladies Man
- Late Night with David Letterman
- Late Show with David Letterman
- Less than Perfect
- Life on a Stick
- Life with Bonnie
- Love, Inc.
- Lovespring International
- Mad About You
- Mad Love
- Melissa & Joey
- Men, Women & Dogs
- The Middle
- Mike & Molly
- Miss Guided
- Modern Family
- Moonlighting
- My Big Fat Greek Life
- My Wife and Kids
- Murphy Brown
- The Naked Truth
- The Nanny
- NewsRadio
- Notes From the Underbelly
- The Office
- Outnumbered
- Out of Practice
- The Parkers
- Perfect Strangers
- Puppets Who Kill
- Psych
- Raising Dad
- Reaper
- Reba
- Rock Me Baby
- Rodney
- Roseanne
- Rules of Engagement
- Samantha Who?
- Second Time Around
- Sex and the City
- She Spies
- The Simpsons
- Slacker Cats
- Son of the Beach
- Sons & Daughters
- Spin City
- Still Standing
- Suburgatory
- Taxi
- The Thin Blue Line
- 'Til Death
- Three Sisters
- Two and a Half Men
- Two Guys and a Girl
- Ugly Betty
- The War at Home
- Watching Ellie
- Weeds
- What I Like About You
- Who's the Boss
- Will And Grace
- Yes, Dear
