= Garen Boyajian =

Canadian actor

- Born: July 5, 1987 (age 38); Toronto, Ontario, Canada
- Occupation: Actor
- Website: www.garenboyajian.com

Garen Boyajian (Armenian: Կարեն Բոյաջյան born July 5, 1987) is a Canadian actor. While continuing to perform in a number of television series and feature films, in 2008 he established a production company with a collection of films in active development.

== Career ==
Boyajian was born in Toronto to a Lebanese born Armenian father and Italian Canadian mother. He studied at Bayview Glen School and continued with an honours degree in business and marketing from York University.

He started acting at age 13, appearing in television commercials and in Aaron Carter music videos. But it was his appearance as a distraught young Arshile Gorky in Atom Egoyan's award-winning Ararat that got the attention of critics. Soon he landed main roles in television series and such as Radio Free Roscoe, ReGenesis, Monster Warriors, The Border. His role in The Cross Road won him "Best Actor Award" in the Monaco International Film Festival. Other film roles included and roles in films most notably Three Veils, The Son of an Afghan Farmer and Bamboo Shark. He has also acted in lead and supporting roles in a number of theatrical productions.

== Filmography ==
=== Film actor ===
Feature films

- 2002: Ararat as Young Arshile Gorky
- 2004: New York Minute as Manjhur
- 2006: Between Truth and Lies as Steve Wright (TV movie)
- 2008: The Cross Road as Salaam
- 2011: Three Veils as Jamal
- 2011: Bamboo Shark as Raj (post-production)
- 2012: The Son of an Afghan Farmer as Sherif
- 2016: The Promise as Eric Boghosian

TV series

- 2001: Screech Owls as Sam (8 episodes - TV series)
- 2003-2005: Radio Free Roscoe as Ed (18 episodes - TV series)
- 2004: Instant Star as Hunter in episode "Even Better Than the Real Thing" (TV series)
- 2004-2008: ReGenesis as Raymond / Nasib Yosuf (11 episodes - TV series)
- 2005: Our Fathers as Vito's Brother (TV movie)
- 2006: Jeff Ltd. as a Persian Child in episode "Ali Baba and the 40 Carpets" (TV series)
- 2006: Monster Warriors as Brighton / Rody (6 episodes - TV series)
- 2008: The Border as Sami / Asif Kafeel (6 episodes - TV series)

Shorts

- 2008: Mookie's Law as Arab
- 2016 : Game Shakers as Burdy

=== Theater actor ===
- A Crooked Man - Lead role (Alianak Productions / Hrant Alianak)
- The Man Who Came to Dinner - Lead role (Bayview Glen Productions / Norm Reynolds)
- Wanda's World - Lead role (Armstrong Productions / Dean Armstrong)

=== Producer ===
- 2008- : The Dove
- 2010- : "Death is a Lonely Business"

== Awards ==
- In 2008, Winner of "Best Actor" at the Monaco International Film Festival for his role as Salaam in The Cross Road
- Co-winner of "Best Ensemble Cast" at the same festival for the same film. Award shared with Shenae Grimes, Tommy Lioutas, Bruce Gooch and Sean O'Neill.
- In 2011, Winner of "Best Actor in a Supporting Role" at the International Filmmaker Festival for his role as Jamal in "Three Veils".
