= Heidi Foss =

Canadian actress, comedian, and writer

Heidi Foss is a Canadian actress, comedian, and writer. In 2001, she won a Canadian Comedy Award honoring her achievements in the field of comedy writing for the Canadian television comedy program This Hour Has 22 Minutes.

Her film and television credits include:

- Arthur - Mary Moo Cow/Patty Jones (voice role)
- Fries with That? - actress/writer
- Obsessed (a 2002 TV drama directed by John Badham) as a prison guard
- Misguided Angels
- In Thru the Out Door
- Doctor*ology
- Fix & Foxi and Friends
- Timothy Goes to School
- Radio Active
- She's So Funny - writer/performer
- Funny Girls - writer/performer
- ToonMarty

Foss has appeared on Comedy Now!, the Just for Laughs television show, Daily Planet, Dr. Katz, Professional Therapist, Ghosts as police officer Sue, and The Mike Bullard Show.

She has provided her voice talents to the animated shows Maggie and the Ferocious Beast, Gerald McBoing-Boing, and Ripley's Believe It or Not!.
