= In Real Life season 3 =

In Real Life
- Season 3
- No. of episodes: 10 (+1 Webisode)

Release
- Original network: YTV
- Original release: October 3 – December 12, 2011

Season chronology
- ← Previous; Season 2

In Real Life is a Canadian reality show where eighteen kids aged 12–14 race across North America and compete in a series of real-life jobs, aimed to "discover the skills, strength, and stamina it takes to make it in real life." The show is developed and produced by Apartment 11 Productions. The show is hosted by Canadian comedian and actress, Sabrina Jalees.

The winner was 14-year-old Zachary Tng from Calgary, Alberta.

The third season premiered on YTV on October 3, 2011 and the season finale aired on December 12, 2011. The Final Webisode, first introduced in Season 2, will return again this season but with a twist - two fans will also have the opportunity to compete alongside the two challengers. This season, challengers will "soldier their way to the top as army recruits, try to avoid the sting of elimination as beekeepers, work on Broadway with the cast and crew of the hit musical Stomp, and perform gravity-defying aerobatics as stunt pilots." As with the previous seasons, the winner walked away with "college tuition money and a dream vacation for 4." The episodes were never released beyond airing.

== Contestants ==
Contestant	Team Colour			Status
Contestant	Week 1 - 4	Week 5 - 7	Week 8 - 10	Status
Zachary Tng, 14, Calgary, Alberta	Yellow Team	Teal Team	Solo	Winner
Sydney Reynolds, 14, Nokomis, Saskatchewan	Pink Team	Yellow Team	Solo	Runner-Up
Abhinav Bhatnagar, 13, Mississauga, Ontario	Yellow Team	Yellow Team	Solo	Eliminated 10th
Anna Walsh, 14, Mount Pearl, NL	Green Team		Solo	Eliminated 9th
Talston Scott, 12, Kelowna, British Columbia	Teal Team		Solo	Eliminated 8th
Sam Krochmal, 14, Edmonton, Alberta	Green Team		Not In; Competition	Eliminated 7th
Brad Howarth, 12, St.Hippolyte, Quebec	Pink Team	Pink Team	Not In; Competition	Eliminated 6th
Msgana Asefaw, 13, Edmonton, Alberta	Teal Team	Pink Team	Not In; Competition	Eliminated 6th
Andreas Murphy, 13, Torbay, NL	Purple Team		Not In; Competition	Eliminated 5th
Kelly Sam, 14, Elk Point, Alberta	Purple Team		Not In; Competition	Eliminated 5th
Amanda Gagnon, 14, Gatineau, Quebec	Orange Team	Not In; Competition	Not In; Competition	Eliminated 4th
Mackenzie Hartloff, 12, Woodbridge, Ontario	Orange Team	Not In; Competition	Not In; Competition	Eliminated 4th
Ashley Hawkins, 13, Niagara Falls, Ontario	Red Team	Not In; Competition	Not In; Competition	Eliminated 3rd
Ted Means, 14, Lethbridge, Alberta	Red Team	Not In; Competition	Not In; Competition	Eliminated 3rd
Eman Osman, 14, Edmonton, Alberta	Blue Team	Not In; Competition	Not In; Competition	Eliminated 2nd
Tanner Kyle, 14, Aylmer, Ontario	Blue Team	Not In; Competition	Not In; Competition	Eliminated 2nd
Chase Martin, 13, Coronach, Saskatchewan	Grey Team	Not In; Competition	Not In; Competition	Eliminated 1st
Louivannah Levasseur, 14, Montreal, Quebec	Grey Team	Not In; Competition	Not In; Competition	Eliminated 1st

- Ages at time of filming
- Mackenzie Hartloff, of the Orange Team, is the younger sister of season one In Real Life runner-up, Maddison Hartloff.

== Results ==
Contestant	Position (by experience)											Average
Contestant	1^{4}	2	3	4^{5}	5^{6}	6	7^{7}	8^{8}	9	10		Average
Zachary	1st^{1}	7th	5th	5th	1st^{2}	1st»^{2}	2nd»^{1} ^{3}	3rd	1st«^{2}	2nd»	1st	2.64
Sydney	4th	5th«	4th	2nd^{2}	2nd⊃^{1}	3rd	1st«^{2}	1st^{1}»	3rd	1st«	2nd	2.55
Abhinav	1st^{1}	7th	5th	5th^{2}	2nd⊃^{1}	3rd	1st«^{2}	4th«	2nd^{1}	3rd		3.30
Anna	8th	6th	1st^{2} ^{3}	4th»	3rd	2nd^{1}	3rd	2nd^{2}	4th»			3.67
Talston	5th	4th	3rd	1st^{1}	1st^{2}	1st»^{2}	2nd»^{1} ^{3}	5th				2.75
Sam	8th	6th	1st^{2} ^{3}	4th»	3rd	2nd^{1}	3rd					3.86
Brad	4th	5th«	4th	2nd^{2}	4th»	4th«						3.83
Msgana	5th	4th	3rd	1st^{1} ^{2}	4th»	4th«						3.50
Andreas	2nd^{2}	3rd»	2nd^{1}	3rd	5th«⊂^{6}							3.00
Kelly	2nd^{2}	3rd»	2nd^{1}	3rd	5th«⊂^{6}							3.00
Amanda	6th	1st^{2}	6th»	6th«								4.75
Mackenzie	6th	1st^{2}	6th»	6th«								4.75
Ted	3rd	2nd^{1}	7th«									4.00
Ashley	3rd	2nd^{1}	7th«									4.00
Eman	7th	8th										7.50
Tanner	7th	8th										7.50
Chase	9th											9.00
Louivannah	9th											9.00

^1 This contestant won the Big Reward
^2 This contestant won the Wrench
^3 This contestant found the Shield
^4 This season, the contestants chose their own teammate after the Obstacle Course challenge
^5 At the end of 4th experience, the five remaining teams had the opportunity to pair up with a new teammate. The original teams were:
Pink Team: Brad and Sydney
Teal Team: Msgana and Talston
Yellow Team: Abhinav and Zachary
^6 Because Brad and Sydney won the wrench in the 4th experience and chose to pair up with a new teammate, two wrenches were used during this experience. Kelly & Andreas received both wrenches
^7 Only one contestant was eliminated during this episode as the two challengers from the last place team competed in a showdown. The winner of this showdown would then continue on in the competition
^8 Beginning in this experience, all teams were dissolved and the remaining challengers competed solo

Red means the contestant was eliminated.
Dark Red means the contestant used a shield but was eliminated.
Purple means the contestant used a shield to escape elimination.
Violet means the contestant used a shield, but won a duel to escape elimination.
Gold means the contestant won the competition.
Silver means the contestant was the runner-up.
» or ⊃ represents the contestant who used the wrench,« or ⊂ represents the contestant who got delayed by it.

== Episode Summary ==
=== Episode 1: Army Recruits ===
Airdate: October 3, 2011 Location: Montreal, Quebec

Tasks	1st place	2nd place	3rd place	4th place	5th place	6th Place	7th Place	8th Place	9th Place	10th Place	11th Place	12th Place	13th Place	14th Place	15th Place	16th Place	17th Place	18th Place
Obstacle Course	Zachary	Louivannah	Brad	Sam	Chase	Tanner	Amanda	Talston	Sydney	Ted	Ashley	Mackenzie	Kelly	Msgana	Abhinav	Anna	Eman	Andreas
Pitching Tents	Red	Yellow	Pink	Purple	Teal	Orange	Green	Grey	Blue									
Paintball Firing	Red	Yellow	Pink	Orange	Green	Teal	Purple	Blue	Grey									
Finding Clue Card and Crossing the Finish Line	Yellow (Big Reward)	Purple (Wrench)	Red	Pink	Teal	Orange	Blue	Green	Grey (Eliminated)									

- Prize: Digital Camera
- Shield: Not Found

Notes:

- The very first task, the obstacle course, was done individually and did not affect team standings, however contestants who placed lowest got to pick their partners.
- 1st To Pick - Andreas picked Kelly and they became the Purple team
- 2nd To Pick - Eman picked Tanner and they became the Blue team
- 3rd To Pick - Anna picked Sam and they became the Green team
- 4th To Pick - Abhinav picked Zach and they became the Yellow team
- 5th To Pick - Msgana picked Talston and they became the Teal team
- 6th To Pick - Mackenzie picked Amanda and they became the Orange team
- 7th To Pick - Ashley picked Ted and they became the Red team
- 8th To Pick - Sydney picked Brad and they became the Pink team
- Not Chosen - Louivannah and Chase were not picked and they became the Grey team
- Kelly would have chosen her partner 6th if she had not been chosen by Andreas
- Ted would have chosen his partner 8th if he had not been chosen by Ashley
- The Blue Team completed the Tent job Second, But the other part of the challenge was to heat up and Eat a Bag of Rations, The Blue Team accidentally Heated up their Rations in their Chemical heating Pad, Eating the rations after they touched the pad could make them sick. They got their Rations confiscated and after the job they were put in Last Place.

=== Episode 2: Beekeepers ===
Airdate: October 10, 2011 Location: Mirabel, Quebec

Tasks	1st place	2nd place	3rd place	4th place	5th place	6th Place	7th Place	8th Place
Find Queen Bee	Orange	Red	Purple	Pink	Yellow	Blue , Green , Teal		
Extracting Honey	Orange	Purple »	Pink «	Red	Teal	Yellow	Green	Blue
Packaging Honey	Orange	Red	Purple	Pink	Teal	Green	Yellow	Blue
Finding Clue Card and Crossing the Finish Line	Orange (Wrench)	Red (Big Reward)	Purple	Teal	Pink	Green	Yellow	Blue (Eliminated)

- Prize: iPod Dock
- Wrench Used on: Pink Team
- Shield Not Found

=== Episode 3: Construction Workers ===
Airdate: October 17, 2011 Location: Ottawa, Ontario

Tasks	1st place	2nd place	3rd place	4th place	5th place	6th Place	7th Place
Mixing Cement	Pink	Orange »	Green♦	Teal	Yellow	Purple	Red «
Building Wall	Green	Yellow	Pink	Purple	Red	Orange	Teal
Installing Roof	Purple	Green	Red, Teal		Pink	Yellow	Orange
Finding Clue Card and Crossing Finish Line	Green (Wrench)	Purple (Big Reward)	Teal	Pink	Yellow	Orange	Red (Eliminated)

- Prize: BMX Bike
- Wrench Used on: Red Team
- Shield: Found by Green Team (Anna, Sam)

=== Episode 4: Stadium Crew ===
Airdate: October 24, 2011 Location: Vancouver, British Columbia

Tasks	1st place	2nd place	3rd place	4th place	5th place	6th Place
Warm-Up Pitcher by Batting and Catching	Yellow	Pink	Purple	Green	Teal	Orange
Mud Baseballs	Teal	Orange	Green	Purple	Yellow	Pink
Selling Hot Dogs	Teal	Pink	Purple	Green »	Yellow	Orange «
Finding Clue Card and Crossing Finish Line	Teal (Big Reward)	Pink (Wrench)	Purple	Green	Yellow	Orange (Eliminated)

- Prize: iPod Scoreboard Dock
- Wrench Used On: Orange Team
- Shield: Not found

Notes:

- At the end of this experience, Sabrina gave the remaining teams an opportunity to split from their teammates, and go with someone else
- Both Brad and Sydney from the Pink Team, Talston from the Teal Team and Zach from the Yellow Team stepped up- Purple and Green Teams stayed together
- Zach and Talston became the new Teal Team, Abhinav and Sydney became the new Yellow Team, and Msgana and Brad became the new Pink Team
- Both Sydney and Brad kept the wrench, meaning both Yellow and Pink now have the wrench

=== Episode 5: Loggers ===
Airdate: November 7, 2011 Location: Squamish, British Columbia

Tasks	1st place	2nd place	3rd place	4th place	5th place
Cut a Log	Pink »	Teal	Green	Yellow	Purple «
Drive Boom Boat	Yellow	Teal	Green	Pink	Purple
Climb Up a Tree	Yellow ⊃	Teal	Green	Pink	Purple ⊂
Finding Clue Card and Crossing Finish Line	Teal (Wrench)	Yellow (Big Reward)	Green	Pink	Purple (Eliminated)

- Prize: Portable DJ Console
- Wrenches Used On: Purple Team during job 1 and job 3
- Shield: Not found

=== Episode 6: Marine Survivalists ===
Airdate: November 14, 2011 Location: Halifax, Nova Scotia

Tasks	1st place	2nd place	3rd place	4th place
Icebreaker Evacuation	Teal	Pink	Yellow, Green	
Helicopter Ditch	Teal	Pink	Green	Yellow
Oil Rig Rescue	Teal »	Pink «	Green	Yellow
Finding Clue Card and Crossing Finish Line	Teal (Wrench)	Green (Big Reward)	Yellow	Pink (Eliminated)

- Prize: Underwater Camera Goggles
- Wrench Used On: Pink Team
- Shield: Not found

=== Episode 7: Broadway Stars ===
Airdate: November 21, 2011 Location: New York City, New York

Tasks	1st place	2nd place	3rd place
Changing Stage Lights	Teal »	Yellow «	Green
Building a Walker	Yellow	Teal ♦	Green
Live Show	Teal	Yellow	Green
Finding Clue Card and Crossing Finish Line	Yellow (Wrench)	Teal (Big Reward) ♦	Green (Sam Eliminated) ♦

- Sam and Anna, from the Green Team, participated in a final showdown - a "Stomp"-off - to determine who would be eliminated. Each challenger was required to perform three short routines from Stomp - musical pipes, wooden sticks and cymbals. Anna was able to complete all routines first and was safe, while Sam was unable to complete any and was eliminated.
- Prize: Portable Karaoke equipment
- Wrench Used on: Yellow Team
- Shield: Found by Teal Team (Talston & Zach)/ Used by Teal Team (Talston & Zach) and Green Team (Sam & Anna)

=== Episode 8: Pizza Chefs ===
Airdate: November 28, 2011 Location: Ridgewood, New Jersey

Tasks	1st place	2nd place	3rd place	4th place	5th place
Making a Batch of Dough	Talston	Zachary	Anna	Sydney	Abhinav
Making Sauce	Sydney »	Talston	Zachary	Anna	Abhinav «
Making a Pizza	Sydney	Talston	Zachary	Anna	Abhinav
Finding Clue Card and Crossing Finish Line	Sydney (Big Reward)	Anna (Wrench)	Zachary	Abhinav	Talston (Eliminated)

- Though Sydney and Abhinav both won the Wrench in the Broadway Stars experience, only one challenger was able to use it. Although Abhinav completed the dough job before Sydney, her dough was deemed the best moving her into fourth and awarding her the wrench while Abhinav was put in last place.
- Prize: Portable Video iWear
- Wrench Used On: Abhinav
- Shield: Not Found

=== Episode 9: Railroad Workers ===
Airdate: December 5, 2011 Location: Pleasant Valley, California

Tasks	1st place	2nd place	3rd place	4th place
Fixing Broken Tracks	Zachary «	Abhinav	Anna »	Sydney
Switching Trains	Abhinav	Sydney	Zachary	Anna
Operating a Train	Zachary	Abhinav	Sydney	Anna
Finding Clue Card and Crossing Finish Line	Zachary (Wrench)	Abhinav (Big Reward)	Sydney	Anna (Eliminated)

- Prize: Seadoo Sea Scooter
- Wrench Used On: Zachary
- Shield: Not Found

=== Episode 10: Stunt Pilots ===
Airdate: December 12, 2011 Location: King City, California

Tasks	1st place	2nd place	3rd place
Cutting Toilet Paper	Zachary »	Abhinav	Sydney «
Finding Clue Card and Finding Hanger Planes	Sydney	Zachary	Abhinav (Eliminated)
Pre-Flight Inspection	Zachary^{1}	Sydney^{0}	
Aerobatic Maneuvers: The Roll, The Loop, and The Humpty Bump	Zachary^{25(10)(7)(7)+ one point}, Sydney^{25(8)(8)(9)}		
Tiebreaker: The Loop and The Humpty Bump	Zachary^{16}(champion)	Sydney^{14} (runner-up)	

Numbers of the superscript indicate total points earned to task; numbers in brackets indicate points earned on that particular task

- Grand Prize: $10,000 scholarship and trip for 4 to Mexico
- Consolation Prize: Tablet Computer
- Wrench Used On: Sydney

Notes:

- Abhinav was eliminated after the second challenge, leaving only Sydney and Zachary to compete in the remainder of the experience.
- Zachary completed the Pre-Flight Inspection first and received a one-point advantage in the final challenge

=== Webisode: Wild Reptile Handlers ===
Viewable online (http://www.inreallife.ytv.com): December 12, 2011

Airdate: December 29, 2011

Location: Saint-Eustache, Quebec and Toronto, Ontario

First introduced in Season 2, the Final Webisode returned this season after the season finale of In Real Life. This season, two fan favourite Challengers who took part in the show participated along with 2 alternates who auditioned for the show in a Final Webisode as Wild Reptile Handlers.

The challengers that were chosen to compete were Ashley and Msgana along with Jonathan Payne from Newfoundland and Noah Cohen from Montreal. The Green Team was Ashley and Noah, and Yellow Team was Msgana and Jonathan. Some of the tasks were to find and feed cockroaches to lizards, weigh a python, feed a boa a dead mouse, and find a clue card in various tarantula tanks. Green was in first the entire time and finished in first. Yellow was last the whole time, and finished Last. There is a shortened version of this episode found on the In Real Life website, while the full version was aired on TV in December 2011.

- First Place Prize: Internet Tablet
- Second Place Prize: Headphones

== Season 3 Records ==
Record	Challenger(s)	Number
Champion (winner)	Zachary	10 Experiences
Most Experience Wins	Zachary	5 Experiences
Most Top Two Finishes	Zachary	6 Experiences
Most Wrenches Won	Zachary	3 Times
Most Times Wrenched^{1}	Sydney	3 Times
Most Big Rewards Won	Abhinav	3 Times
Most Shields Found	Anna, Sam, Talston & Zachary	1 Time
