= Fries with That? =

YTV sitcom

- Created by: Claudio Luca
- Starring: Anne-Marie Baron; Stéfanie Buxton; Giancarlo Caltabiano; Jeanne Bowser; Morgan Kelly
- Music by: Ned Bouhalassa (Original music, Season 1); James Gelfand (Season 2)
- Country of origin: Canada
- Original languages: English; French
- No. of seasons: 2
- No. of episodes: 52

Production
- Running time: 23 minutes
- Production company: Ciné Télé Action Inc.

Original release
- Network: YTV
- Release: 4 April – 18 December 2004

Fries with That? is a Canadian sitcom that aired from April 4 to December 18, 2004.

== Premise ==
The series revolves around a group of high school students who work at a local fast-food restaurant named Bulky's in Montreal. It focuses on many themes such as love, responsibility, friendship, and honesty.

== Principal characters ==
Pattie, cashier. She enjoys playing sports, especially Canadian football and basketball. She uses her athleticism to compensate for her lack of intellect. For example, Pattie uses a unique studying technique, which involves shooting a piece of paper into a makeshift basket in order to learn specific historical events such as July 1, 1867 (Canadian Confederation). Although she is in touch with her masculine side, she is extremely romantic. Her taste for men can vary from an ostracized nerd to a handsome criminal, and she once had feelings for Alex. Her full name is Patricia Johnson.

Tess, cashier. Tess is the free spirit of the crew. Her French accent and last name indicate that she comes from a Francophone household. Her colleagues know her to be extremely creative and artistic. She tends to be rather eccentric, and she believes her aura/soul has a huge presence in her life and should be taken seriously, but is often ignored. She is obsessed with the paranormal and likes to use it as an explanation for everyday occurrences. She is often distracted at work by studying, art projects, deadlines, songs, extra projects, or boys. Her full name is Tess Laverière.

Robyn, cashier, griller, dishwasher. She is the most functional member of the group. She claims to hate men, but has a secret crush on Alex. She hints at the secret several times, but Alex could never figure it out. For example, when Alex and Pattie were mistakenly believed to be in a serious relationship, she indicated with two miniature figurines that they would not be married; she also moped and ate expired chocolate. Her full name is Robyn Cohen.

Alex, burger-flipper. Alex is the typical handsome egotistical teenager. Although he has a reputation of being rude, disgusting, and inconsiderate, he is a loyal friend. He is not very romantic and fails to recognize Robyn's attraction. He tends to be very physical in his relationships and cannot seem to keep his hands off girls that attract him. He also loves to provoke his extremely obsessive assistant manager, Ben Shaw, and they seem to be in a constant state of frustration with each other. His full name is Alexander Kurzi.

Ben is the highly obsessive and greedy assistant manager. He only wants one thing: more profits for Bulky's so that he can get some recognition and finally become the manager. He is sometimes aloof and unpleasant, but other times friendly and accepting. He is a perfectionist and tends to stress easily. Some crewmembers wish he would fall off a bridge, just so they could have a day off. He enjoys making up absurd but "official" sounding rules such as "no member of the crew at Bulky’s is allowed to date another crewmember at Bulky’s." Ben is also an excellent mathematician and greatly enjoys listing and calculating profits. His full name is Benjamin Shaw.

Meiyan, introduced in season two. She loves to annoy Ben, and tried to take his job when he faked his death.

Eddie is not part of the main crew, but rather an employee that transports the supplies from the warehouse to the restaurant. He is portrayed as a simpleton, but revealed he got 100% on all of his provincial exams without cheating. He often replies "____? I'm super good at _____" whenever anyone mentions something they have problems with, but usually, Eddie turns out to not be as good as he says he is. His full name is Eduardo Samisk.

The "head office guy" supervises the restaurant and is constantly bombarding Ben and the crew with threats in order to increase productivity. He tends to be serious, but can be lighthearted, such as when he pulled an April Fool's Day prank on the crew.

== Origin of the series ==
Fries with That? was inspired by the Quebec French language VRAK.TV sitcom Une grenade avec ça? ("A grenade With That?").

== Episodes ==
=== Season 1 ===
Season	Episode No.	Episode Name	Directed By	Written By	Original YTV Airdate
1	1	"The Expendables"	Carl Goldstein	Terence Bowman, Bernard Deniger, & Paul Paré	April 15, 2004
1	2	"Metal Mouth"	Carl Goldstein	Terence Bowman, Bernard Deniger, & Paul Paré	April 14, 2004
1	3	"Coach Pattie"	Adam Weissman	Heidi Foss	April 4, 2004
1	4	"Robyn the Boss"	Adam Weissman	Terence Bowman, Bernard Deniger, & Paul Paré	April 29, 2004
1	5	"Everyone's Alex"	Carl Goldstein	Jackie May	May 17, 2004
1	6	"Help Unwanted"	Carl Goldstein	Shane Simmons	April 20, 2004
1	7	"Where's the Ham?"	Adam Weissman	Terence Bowman, Bernard Deniger, & Paul Paré	May 10, 2004
1	8	"The Ben Effect"	Adam Weissman	Heidi Foss	May 3, 2004
1	9	"The Campaign"	Giles Walker	Terence Bowman, Bernard Deniger, & Paul Paré	May 6, 2004
1	10	"Undercover Guy"	Carl Goldstein	Terence Bowman, Bernard Deniger, & Paul Paré	May 12, 2004
1	11	"Alex's Last Chapter"	Carl Goldstein	Heidi Foss	April 11, 2004
1	12	"Curse of the Tess People"	Giles Walker	Terence Bowman, Bernard Deniger, & Paul Paré	April 19, 2004
1	13	"The Competition"	Giles Walker	Shane Simmons	April 22, 2004
1	14	"Candid Camera"	Carl Goldstein	Scott Faulconbridge	May 19, 2004
1	15	"A Phone for Ben"	Carl Goldstein	Terence Bowman, Bernard Deniger, & Paul Paré	April 21, 2004
1	16	"As Fate would have It"	Sean Dwyer	Scott Faulconbridge	May 11, 2004
1	17	"Mobyn and Myan"	Carl Goldstein	Terence Bowman, Bernard Deniger, & Paul Paré	April 26, 2004
1	18	"The Cold Shoulder"	Carl Goldstein	Shane Simmons	April 27, 2004
1	19	"Music For Your Mouths"	Giles Walker	Heidi Foss	May 5, 2004
1	20	"Tigerman"	Giles Walker	Terence Bowman, Bernard Deniger, & Paul Paré	May 25, 2004
1	21	"Alternative Ben"	Carl Goldstein	Heidi Foss	May 4, 2004
1	22	"Foreign Effects"	Carl Goldstein	Scott Faulconbridge	May 18, 2004
1	23	"The Love Potion"	Giles Walker	Terence Bowman, Bernard Deniger, & Paul Paré	May 20, 2004
1	24	"A Side order of Love"	Giles Walker	Terence Bowman, Bernard Deniger, & Paul Paré	May 24, 2004
1	25	"While Supplies Last"	Giles Walker	Shane Simmons	May 13, 2004
1	26	"Mini Ben"	Giles Walker	Terence Bowman, Bernard Deniger, & Paul Paré	May 28, 2004

=== Season 2 ===
Season	Episode No.	Episode Name	Directed By	Written By	Original YTV Airdate
2	1	"Ben Bites"	Giles Walker	Heidi Foss	September 9, 2004
2	2	"Alex Takes Over"	Giles Walker	Terence Bowman, Bernard Deniger, & Paul Paré	September 14, 2004
2	3	"For a Limited Time Only"	Giles Walker	Shane Simmons	September 16, 2004
2	4	"Burgatron 9000"	Adam Weissman	Shane Simmons	September 21, 2004
2	5	"Dearly Departed"	Giles Walker	Heidi Foss	September 23, 2004
2	6	"The Prankster"	Giles Walker	Scott Faulconbridge	September 28, 2004
2	7	"Peace, Love and Misunderstanding"	Adam Weissman	Terence Bowman, Bernard Deniger, & Paul Paré	September 30, 2004
2	8	"Pass/Fail"	Adam Weissman	Alan Silberberg	October 5, 2004
2	9	"The Soup Kitchen"	Giles Walker	Heidi Foss	October 7, 2004
2	10	"The Food Critic"	Adam Weissman	Heidi Foss	October 12, 2004
2	11	"Heart of the Matter"	Giles Walker	Scott Faulconbridge	October 14, 2004
2	12	"One Alex to Go"	Adam Weissman	Terence Bowman, Bernard Deniger, & Paul Paré	October 19, 2004
2	13	"The Return of a Man Called Smith"	Adam Weissman	Terence Bowman, Bernard Deniger, & Paul Paré	November 4, 2004
2	14	"Drive-thru Speaker Bandit"	Adam Weissman	Heidi Foss	November 9, 2004
2	15	"The Hottie"	Giles Walker	Scott Faulconbridge	September 7, 2004
2	16	"Flipping Over You"	Adam Weissman	Scott Faulconbridge	October 21, 2004
2	17	"The Haunted"	Adam Weissman	Terence Bowman, Bernard Deniger, & Paul Paré	October 28, 2004
2	18	"Mortimer's Makeover"	Giles Walker	Terence Bowman	November 23, 2004
2	19	"Love and War"	Adam Weissman	Terence Bowman, Bernard Deniger, & Paul Paré	November 2, 2004
2	20	"Catering on the Side"	Adam Weissman	Alan Silberberg	November 25, 2004
2	21	"Shake, Cattle and Roll"	Adam Weissman	Shane Simmons	November 30, 2004
2	22	"Love, Robyn Style"	Giles Walker	Terence Bowman, Bernard Deniger, & Paul Paré	December 2, 2004
2	23	"Sleeping with the Fish Sticks"	Adam Weissman	Shane Simmons	November 11, 2004
2	24	"Dirty Burger"	Giles Walker	Philip Kalin-Hajdu	November 18, 2004
2	25	"Robyn... and Eddy"	Adam Weissman	Terence Bowman, Bernard Deniger, & Paul Paré	November 16, 2004
2	26	"It's a Wonderful Christmas Time, Ben Shaw"	Adam Weissman	Terence Bowman, Bernard Deniger, & Paul Paré	December 18, 2004

== Cast ==
- Jeanne Bowser as Pattie Johnson
- Giancarlo Caltabiano as Ben Shaw
- Morgan Kelly as Alex Kurzi
- Stefanie Buxton as Robyn Cohen
- Anne-Marie Baron as Tess Laverriere
- Li Li as Meiyan
- Kent McQuaid as Eddie
- Heidi Foss as the Principal
- Arthur Holden as Head Office Guy
