= Moez Kassam =

Canadian alternative assets manager (born 1980)

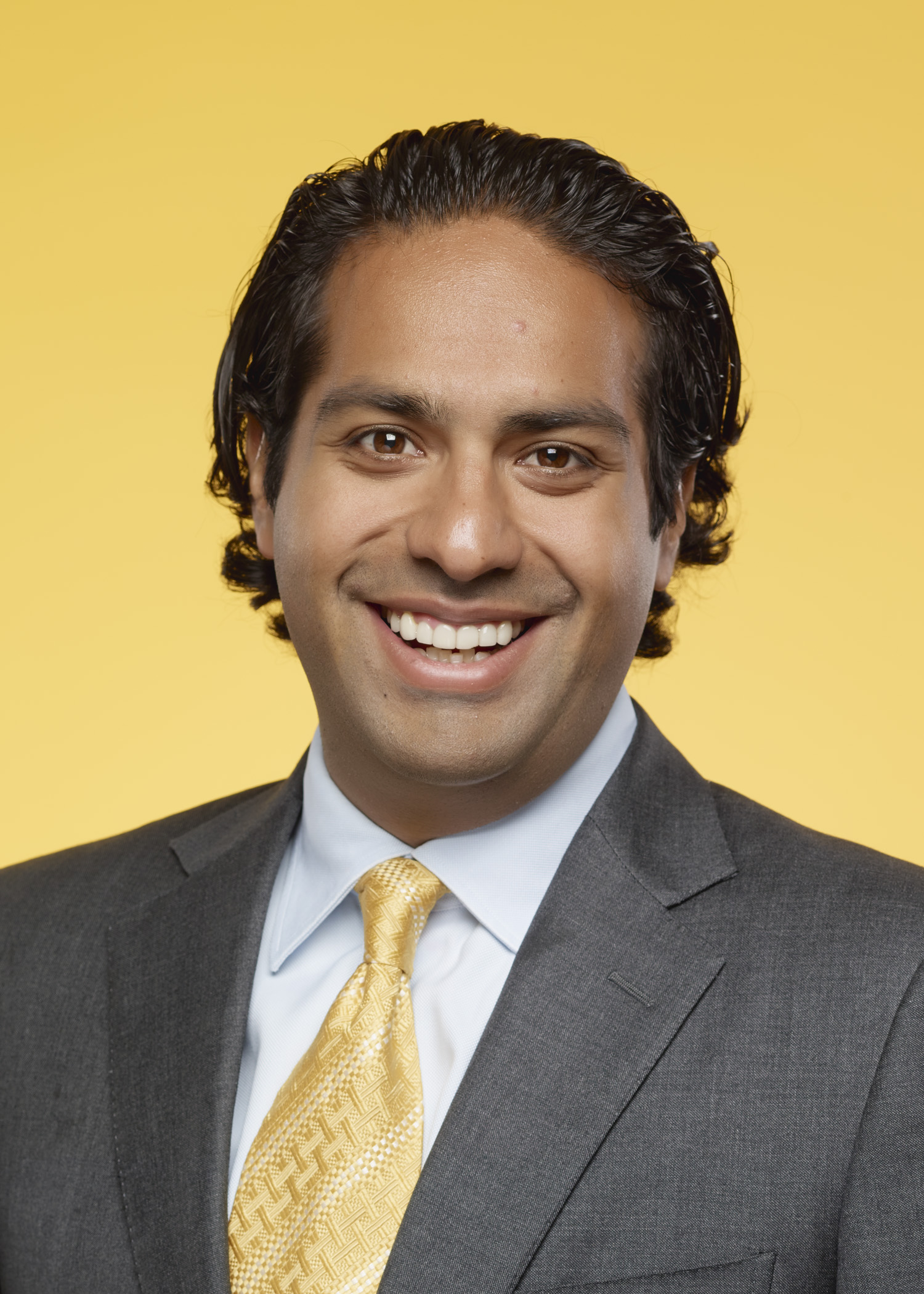
- Born: August 27, 1980 (age 46); Toronto, Ontario, Canada
- Education: University of Western Ontario (B.A.), London Business School (MBA)
- Occupation: Hedge fund manager

Moez Kassam (born August 27, 1980, in Toronto, Ontario) is a Canadian alternative asset manager. He is a founder and principal of Anson Funds, which manages a collection of long-short equity funds - most notably, Anson Investments Master Fund LP (AIMF). Anson Group was founded in 2007. Kassam also received the 2018 Canada's 40 under 40 award. He is on the Board of Directors for the Canadian Olympic Committee foundation.

== Early life and education ==
Kassam was born in 1980 in Toronto, Canada to a Tanzanian-born father and Indian mother. He started school at Bayview Glen School in 1994. His interest in financial markets began after his class placed in the top three schools in the TD Stock Portfolio Challenge (within Ontario). He subsequently attended the University of Western Ontario, graduating in 2002 with a Bachelor of Arts. In 2010, Kassam received an MBA in finance from the London Business School, a constituent college of the University of London.

In 2025, he received and honorary Doctorate of Laws from the Toronto Metropolitan University.

== Career ==
In 2007, Kassam founded Anson Funds, an alternative asset management company that focuses on three core strategies: classic shorts, value longs and opportunistic investments. Anson Group now operates several investment funds including Anson Investments Master Fund (AIMF). He is the primary Portfolio Manager of Anson Investments Management Fund (AIMF), the flagship fund out of a collection of funds managed by Anson Funds. Anson and Kassam has been featured in several publications, such as Barron’s, Bloomberg and Forbes for their distinctive investment strategy. In 2021, Anson Funds posted returns of 45.5% on the back of the retail stock frenzy

In 2025, he received the United Nations Association in Canada Global Citizen Award (UNAC).

== Personal life ==
Moez married Marissa Siegal in 2016, and together they have four children.

== Philanthropy ==
In 2016, Kassam created the Moez and Marissa Kassam Equity Fund to support initiatives that level the playing field and improve health outcomes.

In June 2020, Kassam joined the board of directors for the Canadian Olympic Committee foundation. The Kassam Equity Fund donated $1 million to the Canadian Olympic Foundation to create “Great to Gold”, a data-driven fundraising initiative to support Canadian athletes at the 2024 Summer Olympics in Paris. The initiative helped fund athletes that won gold in several sports and helped deliver 10 of Canada’s 27 medals.At the 2026 Winter Olympics in Milano Cortina, Great to Gold supported 55 athletes and three teams, and athletes it backed won 15 of Canada's 21 medals.

Kassam sits on the board of the Young Presidents Organization (YPO), and Toronto Public Library Foundation.

In March 2021, Moez contributed $1M to Michael Garron Hospital in Toronto. In May 2022, Moez and Marissa Kassam also donated to the Sinai Health Foundation to assist in medical research in neonatal care. They contributed $300,000 to the APPLE Schools Health initiative, which supports healthy eating for children in disadvantaged communities.

Kassam has donated to the University of Toronto, which allowed him to invite Abdulaziz Sachedina to join Emmanuel College at the University of Toronto as a distinguished visiting professor of Islamic Studies. In 2023, the Moez & Marissa Foundation supported the Toronto Foundation for Student Success with the launch of the “‘School Opportunity Fund”’ which provides financial support to schools that need assistance with obtaining resources for their students.

In 2023 and 2024, Kassam was recognized by Toronto Life magazine as one of Toronto’s most influential people due to his philanthropic efforts.

In November 2024, Moez & Marissa Kassam Equity Fund donated $5 million to Toronto Metropolitan University’s new medical school.

In December 2024, Moez & Marissa Kassam Equity Fund donated $15M to Sick Kids Hospital to establish two pediatric research positions and further critical care.
