= Saturday Night Magazine (U.S.) =

- Categories: Lifestyle magazine
- Frequency: Monthly
- Publisher: Michael H. Ritter
- Founded: 2003
- Final issue: 2010
- Company: Andela Publishing, LLC.
- Country: USA
- Website: Snmag.com

Saturday Night Magazine was a lifestyle and entertainment magazine created in 2003 at the University of Southern California by publisher and founder Michael Ritter. Saturday Night Magazine targeted a readership of 18- to 29-year-olds through editorial coverage that includes: celebrities, fashion, sports, politics, music, technology, travel, careers, movies, video games, and comedy. The median age of its readers was 23. Covers featured celebrities and public figures such as: Katy Perry, Shenae Grimes, DJ AM, Emma Stone, Amber Heard, Sophia Bush, Rachel Bilson, Scarlett Johansson, Kristen Bell, Katie Couric, Audrina Patridge, Heidi Montag and Malin Åkerman. It was found on college campuses in Los Angeles, San Francisco, San Diego, Phoenix and Tucson, as well as at many off-campus retail locations. In November 2008, Saturday Night Magazine celebrated its 40th issue. In 2010 the magazine ended publication.

== Saturday Night Magazine features ==
=== "On Tap" ===
Saturday Night Magazine had a weekly section which outlines news and factoids as well as a "so over it" and "so into it" list.

=== "Destination Success" ===
"Destination Success" was the career section of Saturday Night Magazine. It focused on the varying career paths and successes of up and coming talent, entrepreneurs, and trendsetters. Past issues have highlighted: Digg.com founder Kevin Rose, Juicycampus.com founder Matt Ivester, Lauren Bush, LinkedIn co-founder Allen Blue, E! Movie Correspondent Ben Lyons, Craigslist founder Craig Newmark and Pinkberry founder Young Lee.

=== "The Scene" ===
"The Scene" is a monthly guide outlining the newest nightclubs, lounges, bars and restaurants in Los Angeles, San Francisco, San Diego, Phoenix, Scottsdale and Tucson.

=== Music ===
Each issue features a two-page interview with a musical artist. Previous artists featured include Gym Class Heroes, Tori Amos, Phantom Planet, Louis XIV, Death Cab for Cutie, Black Kids, Bloc Party, Steve Aoki, Hot Hot Heat, The Shins and Muse.

=== Car Guide ===
A themed monthly car section which broke down the features, design and specs of new vehicles.

=== Entertainment ===
A six-page section featured reviews of new TV shows, movies, gadgets, video games, DVDs, books and websites. Also included giveaways and celebrity Q&As. Recent featured celebrities include Jorge Garcia, Jared Padalecki, Zach Gilford, Haylie Duff, Kellan Lutz, Aaron Yoo and Drake Bell.

=== "Last Laugh" ===
"Last Laugh" was the comedy section of Saturday Night Magazine which is a photograph series accompanied by captions of comical situations.

== Saturday Night Magazine online ==
Saturday Night Magazine's website (snmag.com) delivered daily updates, archived articles, extended editorial content and interactive extras including contests, giveaways, polls, photos and exclusive videos.

== Annual issues ==
Annual issues included:

- September – Back to School
- October – Best of...
- Dec/Jan – Holiday Gift Guide
- February – Spring Break Travel Issue
- March – Careers Issue
- April – The Future of...
- June – Summer Movie Preview
- July – Swimsuit Issue
