= Blood Honey (film) =

- Theatrical release poster
- Directed by: Jeff Kopas
- Written by: Douglas Taylor; Jeff Kopas
- Produced by: Robert Budreau; Jeff Kopas; Ryan Reaney; Marina Cordoni; Dan Peel; Douglas Taylor
- Starring: Shenae Grimes-Beech; Gil Bellows; Kenneth Mitchell; Don McKellar; Natalie Brown; Morgan Kelly; Scott McCord; Matt Gordon
- Cinematography: D. Gregor Hagey
- Edited by: Mike Reisacher
- Music by: Amin Bhatia
- Production companies: Lumanity Productions; Manitouwabi Films; Vitality Media Productions Inc
- Distributed by: Northern Banner Entertainment (Canada); Super Channel (Canada); Tricoast Worldwide (U.S)
- Release dates: September 1, 2017 (Canada); February 1, 2018 (United States)
- Running time: 95 minutes
- Country: Canada
- Language: English
- Budget: CAD$2.5 million

Blood Honey is a 2017 Canadian thriller film directed by Jeff Kopas from a screenplay written by Douglas Taylor and Jeff Kopas. The film has an ensemble cast including Shenae Grimes-Beech, Gil Bellows, Kenneth Mitchell, Don McKellar, Natalie Brown, Morgan Kelly, Scott McCord and Matt Gordon.

== Plot ==
Tortured by memories of childhood trauma, Jenibel returns, after a decade away, to her family's fly-in hunting lodge to assist her siblings with their dying father, only to find herself stuck in a life-threatening nightmare.

Summoned by her dying father, Jenibel Heath (Shenae Grimes-Beech), after a decade away, reluctantly returns to her beautiful island home, a remote fly-in hunting and fishing lodge. Waiting for her is bitter family dysfunction and the nightmare of her last childhood memory: the suicide of her mother. Soon, Jenibal finds herself burdened with selling off the family lodge, against the wishes of her family and friends. In a harrowing passage through guilt, loyalty, and devastating memories, Jenibel navigates an obstacle course of personal torment that pushes her psyche to the breaking point. What begins as a journey of forgiveness, devolves into a fatal nightmare and a struggle to maintain not just her sanity, but her life.

Jenibel Heath finally faces what she's been avoiding her entire adult life: She's going home.

As a child, following the suicide of her emotionally fragile mother, Jenibel was sent away from her Northern Ontario island home, to be raised and schooled by her aunt in England. Through puberty and adulthood, Jenibel's bitter hatred of her father, Marvin, results in a vow to never return to her unhappy family roots. However, summoned by Marvin's dying wish, she journeys homeward with the hope of achieving forgiveness and acceptance. Immediately upon arriving, undercurrents of menace are evident. Jenibel is haunted by the memory of her mother leaping to her death from the top of the water tower. Her brother, Neil, whose narrow experience has never ventured beyond their island, is notably hostile to her arrival. His behavior betrays a deeply-rooted anger, barely contained. Her younger sister, Linda, born with down-syndrome, reminds Jenibel that she has been gone a very long time, effectively abandoning the entire family.

Marvin, Jenibel's terminally ill father, is hardly frail in his drunken, bitter rants. Indeed, it isn't long before Jenibel regrets making the journey. She is even thwarted in her hope of expressing a measure of forgiveness towards spiteful Marvin.

In a surprising turn of events, Marvin forces a troubling moral dilemma upon Jenibel. While committing a dramatic act of gruesome suicide, he exacts a verbal promise from Jenibel that she will sell the family hunting/fishing business, and the land itself, to finally set the family "free."

Saddled with the burden of this dying wish, Jenibel learns that Marvin has left the family property, assets, and debts, to be shared between herself and her angry brother, Neil. The one catch: Jenibel is bequeathed a 51% share, giving her controlling interest. This empowers her to fulfill her promise to sell the operation against the wishes of her brother, their employees, and even their kindly neighbor and friend, Dr. Bert Morrison.

It's like her father has played a cruel joke on her. In his last dying breath, he has made her responsible for uprooting their entire family history, their livelihood, community, and the protective isolation that has fostered family dysfunction for generations.

Jenibel begins to have strange visions, or waking dreams – nightmarish and terrifying – involving her dead parents, deep-felt guilt, and even lucid fantasies that the island itself wants to swallow her whole. As hostilities build and her hallucinations become more frequent, Jenibel suspects that the others are slowly poisoning her. With everyone around her angrily attempting to prevent her from selling the family business, she becomes desperate to escape.

Her fears prove to be more than just paranoia. In a climactic denouement, Jenibel is thwarted in her attempts to flee and is literally held captive until she submits to the will of the group. In a final, startling twist, Jenibel's growing madness proves to be more effective in setting her family “free” than her father might have imagined. If “freedom” requires personal transformation, Jenibel delivers on her father's wishes in a macabre, unexpected act of vengeance.

== Cast ==
- Shenae Grimes-Beech as Jenibel Heath
- Gil Bellows as Marvin Heath
- Kenneth Mitchell as Neil Heath
- Don McKellar as Dr. Bert Morrison
- Morgan Kelly as Bruce Lippe
- Scott McCord as Joe Bananali
- Matt Gordon as Randal Peters
- Natalie Brown as Natalie Heath
- Rosemary Dunsmore as Louisa Lippe
- Michael Hanrahan as Andre Lippe
- Ellen-Ray Hennessy as Therapist
- Ava Preston as Young Jenibel
- Luke McMillan as Young Bruce
- Krystal Hope Nausbaum as Linda Heath

== Production ==
Blood Honey was directed by Jeff Kopas. Kopas played an important role as a director, and was reviewed as having a decent eye for imbuing scenes with subtle menace. The production began in September 2015 and continued until November 1, 2015. Post-Production was done in Toronto during the winter and spring of 2016.

The film was shot on two remote islands in Georgian Bay, near the small town of Britt in the Parry Sound area of Ontario Canada in the fall of 2015.

== Release ==
=== Marketing ===
A viral marketing campaign began on August 30, 2017, with a publicity stunt. Juan Carlos Noguez Ortiz broke the Guinness World Record for the longest duration with his head fully covered in live bees. Dickey Bee Farm provided the bees for the film and also for the stunt. It was performed at Dundas Square in downtown Toronto in connection with the premiere of the film at nearby Cineplex's Yonge-Dundas Cinema.

Peter Dickey, the master beekeeper said, "We brought 100,000 bees with us, so there are more bees with us today than ever. But we brought the gentle ones so that is very important when we are doing bearding."

== Reception ==
=== Box office ===
Blood Honey did a day and date release and opened in limited theatres in Ottawa on Aug 31 and Toronto on September 1 before expanding to Vancouver and Calgary on September 8 and 12, 2017. In the United States, the film was released on February 1, 2018, at the sametime it was released digitally on iTunes, Google Video, Vimeo on Demand, Comcast, Rogers on Demand, Bell on Demand, Amazon, Hulu, and Superchannel.

=== Critical response ===
On Rotten Tomatoes, the film holds an approval rating of 25%, based on 8 reviews, with a weighted average rating of 4.25/10.

It was described on GetReelMovies as "a quality film that shows the strengths of the Canadian film industry. From the talented cast and crew to the awe-inspiring visuals, there is a lot to like in this unique mind-bender."

Cinema Axis wrote that the film "isn't your typical family drama. While most brim with emotion, the director has added paranoia, mistrust and rivalry to create an unusual psychological thriller."

The Globe and Mail writes "There is a death that director Jeff Kopas wants so badly to be terrifying but unfortunately comes off as silly. Is Jenibel losing her mind? Is everyone at the lodge conspiring against her? Is someone poisoning her? Will she be able to flee to safety? Grimes-Beech delivers a fine performance, and while there are moments of intrigue and a good twist, the whole thing feels as if it's a B-movie horror that wants to be so much more." "
