= Morgan Kelly =

Canadian actor (born 1976)

- Born: 23 June 1976 (age 49); Montreal, Quebec, Canada
- Occupation: Actor
- Years active: 1999–present

Morgan Kelly (born 23 June 1976) is a Canadian actor, best known for his roles on Being Erica and Killjoys.

== Career ==
Kelly is known for his role on Fries with That? as Alexander "Alex" Kurzi. He also appears on Falcon Beach as Lane Bradshaw, a juvenile delinquent and as "Skinny" briefly on Degrassi: The Next Generation. He also played a small part in the film A History of Violence as a friend to the bully who picks on Jack Stall. He played a recurring role in the series Being Erica, and also made a one-episode appearances on Flashpoint, Alphas, and Beauty & the Beast before playing a recurring character on Killjoys.

== Filmography ==
=== Film ===
Year	Title	Role	Notes
2002	Steal	Pink-Faced Guy	
2003	Shattered Glass	Joe	
2003	Hatley High	Darryl	
2004	Fries with That?	Alex	
2005	A History of Violence	Bobby's Buddy	
2007	The Lookout	Marty	
2009	Darkness Waits	Jesse	
2010	Ice Castles	Aiden Reynolds	
2010	New Year	Leon Gilbert	
2013	Long Gone Day	Jake	
2014	Dead of Winter	Marcus	
2016	Rupture	Tommy	
2017	Blood Honey	Bruce Lippe	
2017	The Shape of Water	Pie Guy	

=== Television ===
Year	Title	Role	Notes
Unknown	Undressed	Mike	Unknown episodes
2000	Live Through This	Zack	Television film
2002	Seriously Weird	Gordon	Unknown episode
2003	Deadly Betrayal	Young Adam	Television film
2004	Petits Mythes Urbains	Teen #1	1 Episode: #1.20
2004	Petite Mythes Urbains	Jack	1 Episode: Unknown
2004	The Last Casino	Scott's Housemate #1	Television film
2004	Fries with That?	Alex	Main: 52 episodes
2005	Degrassi: The Next Generation	"Skinny"	1 Episode: #4.22
2005	Tilt	J.J.	1 Episode: #1.5
2005	Living with the Enemy	Rudy	Television film
2006	Between Truth and Lies	Tony Roth	Television film
2006	Banshee	Tony Romano	Television film
2006	Angela's Eyes	Kevin Harlow	1 Episode: #1.4
2006–2007	Falcon Beach	Lane Bradshaw	Main: 26 episodes (Seasons 1–2)
2007	True Crimes: The First 72 Hours	Shawn Barrett	1 Episode: #3.5 (Documentary)
2007	Tell Me You Love Me	Gil	1 Episode: #1.1
2007	All the Good Ones Are Married	Trey	Television film
2008	The Watch	Chad	Television film
2008	Paparazzi Princess: The Paris Hilton Story	Jack	Television film
2009	Manson	Dennis Wilson	Television film documentary
2009	Flashpoint	Jason	1 Episode: #2.17
2009–2011	Being Erica	Brent Kennedy	Main: 48 episodes (Seasons 1–4)
2010	The Last Christmas	Ian La Foret	Television film
2011	Suits	Matt Bailey	1 Episode: #1.12
2012	Murdoch Mysteries	Wade Carson	1 Episode: #5.11
2012	Saving Hope	Kyle	1 Episode: #1.8
2012	Alphas	Tommy	1 Episode: #2.4
2012	The L.A. Complex	Jack	1 Episode: #2.5
2012	Beauty & the Beast	Detective Philmore	Guest: 2 episodes
2013	Played	Paul Devlin	1 Episode: #1.2
2014	Aaliyah: The Princess of R&B	Senior Label Executive	Television film
2015	Open Heart	Nick	2 episodes
2015	The Secret Life of Marilyn Monroe	Tom Kelly	Miniseries (1 episode)
2015	The Strain	Stevens	1 Episode: #2.10
2015	Blood and Water	Clayton Lind	3 episodes
2015–2017	Killjoys	Alvis Akari	Recurring: 16 episodes (Seasons 1–3)
2017	Good Witch	Jim	1 Episode: #3.3
2018	The Expanse	Lieutenant Mancuso	2 Episodes: #3.3 & #3.5
2019	Mindhunter	Paul Bateson	1 Episode: #2.6
2020	Spinning Out	Reggie	4 episodes
2020	The Umbrella Academy	William Gates	1 episode
2020	Tiny Pretty Things	Alan Renfrew	7 episodes
2020	Christmas Unwrapped	Aaron Coleman	Television film
2023	Culprits	Kyle Bedrosian	Recurring
