= In Real Life season 1 =

In Real Life
- Season 1
- No. of episodes: 13

Release
- Original network: YTV
- Original release: March 4 – June 3, 2009

Season chronology
- Next → Season 2

In Real Life (formerly known as In the Real World) is a Canadian reality show where eighteen young contestants aged 12–14 race across North America and compete in a series of real-life jobs, aimed to "discover the skills, strength, and stamina it takes to make it in real life." The show is developed and produced by Apartment 11 Productions.

The first season was originally planned to premiere on February 4, 2009 as In the Real World. but was delayed one month. The first season premiered on March 4, 2009 and concluded on June 3, 2009.

The winner was 13-year-old Ruby-Rae Rogawski from Langley, British Columbia.

== Contestants ==
Contestant	Team Colour			Status
Contestant	Week 1 - 5	Week 6 - 8	Week 9 - 13	Status
Ruby-Rae Rogawski, 13, Langley, British Columbia	Purple Team		Solo	Winner
Maddison Hartloff, 14, Woodbridge, Ontario	Yellow Team		Solo	Runner-Up/Withdrew
Talon Leuchter, 14, Toronto, Ontario	Yellow Team		Solo	Eliminated 10th
Benjamin 'Ben' Moran, 14, Charlottetown, Prince Edward Island	Purple Team		Solo	Eliminated 9th
Graeme Prendergast, 13, Victoria, British Columbia	Brown Team	Red Team	Solo	Eliminated 8th
Aaron Engel, 12, Fort Ellis, Nova Scotia	Red Team	Red Team	Solo	Eliminated 7th
Jaicyea Smith, 13, Toronto, Ontario	Red Team	Grey Team	Not In; Competition	Eliminated 6th
Isiah Lee, 13, Toronto, Ontario	Grey Team	Grey Team	Not In; Competition	Eliminated 6th
Landon Logie, 14, Mississauga, Ontario	Grey Team	Brown Team	Not In; Competition	Eliminated 5th
Tyler Gourley, 13, Abbotsford, British Columbia	Brown Team	Brown Team	Not In; Competition	Eliminated 5th
Jaiden Magnaye, 14, Mississauga, Ontario	Orange Team	Not In; Competition	Not In; Competition	Eliminated 4th
Paige Mann, 13, Beaver Dam, New Brunswick	Orange Team	Not In; Competition	Not In; Competition	Eliminated 4th
Lilith Bentley, 13, Salt Spring Island, British Columbia	Blue Team	Not In; Competition	Not In; Competition	Eliminated 3rd
Paul Best, 14, Ottawa, Ontario	Blue Team	Not In; Competition	Not In; Competition	Eliminated 3rd
Samantha 'Sammi' Campbell-Mymko, 12, Winnipeg, Manitoba	Teal Team	Not In; Competition	Not In; Competition	Eliminated 2nd
Madison Bugeja, 13, Barrie, Ontario	Teal Team	Not In; Competition	Not In; Competition	Eliminated 2nd
Jesse Cabral, 12, Barrie, Ontario	Green Team	Not In; Competition	Not In; Competition	Eliminated 1st
Carlisse Gomez, 13, Scarborough, Ontario	Green Team	Not In; Competition	Not In; Competition	Eliminated 1st

- Ages at time of filming

== Results ==
Contestant	Position (by experience)													Average
Contestant	1	2	3	4	5	6^{5}	7	8^{6}	9^{7}	10	11	12	13^{8}	Average
Ruby-Rae	2nd^{2}	1st^{1}»	2nd^{2}	6th»	1st^{2}	1st^{1}»	1st^{2}«	2nd»^{3}	2nd^{2}	1st^{1}»	2nd^{2}	2nd^{2}»	1st»	1.92
Maddison H	9th	4th«	3rd	3rd	3rd«	2nd^{2}	3rd»^{3}	1st^{1}«	5th	4th	1st^{1}	1st^{1} ^{3}	2nd«^{9}	3.15
Talon	9th	4th«	3rd	3rd	3rd«	2nd^{2}	3rd»^{3}	1st^{1}«	1st^{1} ^{3}	3rd	4th«	3rd«		3.25
Ben	2nd^{2}	1st^{1}»	2nd^{2}	6th»	1st^{2}	1st^{1}»	1st^{2}«	2nd»^{3}	3rd	2nd^{2}«	3rd»			2.18
Graeme	4th	7th	6th	2nd^{2}	4th»	3rd^{4}«	2nd^{1}	3rd	4th	5th				4.00
Aaron	3rd	3rd^{3}	4th	1st^{1}	2nd^{1}	3rd^{4}«	2nd^{1}	3rd	6th					3.00
Jaicyea	3rd	3rd^{3}	4th	1st^{1}	2nd^{1}	5th^{4}	4th							3.14
Isiah	8th	6th	5th«	4th«	5th	5th^{4}	4th							5.50
Landon	8th	6th	5th«	4th«	5th	4th^{4}								5.33
Tyler	4th	7th	6th	2nd^{2}	4th»	4th^{4}								4.50
Jaiden	1st^{1}	8th	7th	5th	6th									5.40
Paige	1st^{1}	8th	7th	5th	6th									5.40
Paul	6th	2nd^{2}	1st^{1}»	7th										4.00
Lilith	6th	2nd^{2}	1st^{1}»	7th										4.00
Madison B	5th	5th	8th											6.00
Samantha	5th	5th	8th											6.00
Jesse	7th	9th												8.00
Carlisse	7th	9th												8.00

^1 This contestant won the big reward
^2 This contestant won the wrench
^3 This contestant found the shield
^4 This contestant received a new team member. The original teams were:
Red Team: Aaron and Jaicyea
Grey Team: Landon and Isiah
Brown Team: Graeme and Tyler
^5 This experience allowed the remaining competitors to swap teams
^6 At the end of this experience, any shields that teams possessed were now out of play
^7 Beginning in this experience, all teams were dissolved and competitors competed alone
^8 Beginning in this experience, any shields that players possessed were now out of play

^9 Maddison quit towards the end of the final experience resulting in Ruby-Rae winning the competition.

Red means the contestant was eliminated.
Blue means the episode was a non-elimination episode, therefore the contestant was not eliminated.
Purple means the contestant used the shield to escape elimination.
Gold means the contestant won the competition.
Silver means the contestant was the runner up.
» represents the contestant who used the wrench, « represents the contestant who got delayed by it.

== Episode Summary ==
=== Episode 1: Auto Racing ===
Aired: Wednesday, March 4, 2009.

Location: Atlanta, Georgia

Tasks	1st place	2nd place	3rd place	4th place	5th place	6th Place	7th Place	8th Place	9th Place
Go Kart Race	Green	Brown	Yellow	Purple	Grey	Orange	Teal	Blue	Red
Locate Garage and Change Air Filter	Yellow	Purple	Teal	Brown	Orange	Red	Blue	Grey	Green
Find Clue Card and Race to the Pit Stop	Yellow	Blue	Purple	Orange	Brown	Red	Teal	Grey	Green
Identify Flags and Crossing the Finish Line	Orange (Big Reward)	Purple (Wrench)	Red	Brown	Teal	Blue	Green	Grey	Yellow (Non-Elimination)

- Prize: Remote Control Go Kart
- Shield: Not Found

=== Episode 2: Alligator Wranglers ===
Aired: Wednesday, March 11, 2009

Location: Florida City, Florida

Tasks	1st place	2nd place	3rd place	4th place	5th place	6th Place	7th Place	8th Place	9th Place
Collect Baby Alligators	Purple	Teal	Yellow	Grey	Orange	Red	Blue	Brown	Green
Collect Adult Alligator	Purple »	Grey	Teal	Blue	Red	Yellow «	Brown	Orange	Green
Feed Alligators	Purple	Teal	Blue	Red	Yellow	Grey	Brown	Orange	Green
Finding Clue Card and Crossing the Finish Line	Purple (Big Reward)	Blue (Wrench)	Red	Yellow	Teal	Grey	Brown	Orange	Green (Eliminated)

- Prize: Air-Boat Ride
- Wrench Used On: Yellow Team
- Shield: Found by Red Team (Aaron & Jaicyea)

=== Episode 3: Rodeo Cowboys and Cowgirls ===
Aired: Wednesday, March 18, 2009

Location: Rose Hill, Kansas

Tasks	1st place	2nd place	3rd place	4th place	5th place	6th Place	7th Place	8th Place
Fake-Bull Riding	Purple , Yellow , Blue , Brown , Orange					Red , Grey		Teal
Tag Bulls	Purple	Brown	Grey	Blue	Yellow	Red	Orange	Teal
Real-Bull Riding	Purple	Brown	Yellow	Blue »	Grey «	Red	Orange	Teal
Finding Clue Card and Crossing the Finish Line	Blue (Big Reward)	Purple (Wrench)	Yellow	Red	Grey	Brown	Orange	Teal (Eliminated)

- Prize: Electric Guitars
- Wrench Used On: Grey Team
- Shield: Not Found

=== Episode 4: Hollywood Stunt Performers ===
Aired: Wednesday, March 25, 2009

Location: Hollywood, Los Angeles, California

Tasks	1st place	2nd place	3rd place	4th place	5th place	6th Place	7th Place
Chase Scene	Purple	Grey	Yellow	Blue	Brown	Red	Orange
Building A Prop-Stool	Red	Yellow	Orange	Brown	Grey «	Purple »	Blue
Re-enact Scene	Yellow	Brown	Red	Grey	Orange	Blue	Purple
Finding Clue Card and Crossing the Finish Line	Red (Big Reward)	Brown (Wrench)	Yellow	Grey	Orange	Purple	Blue (Eliminated)

- Prize: Hollywood Tour
- Wrench Used On: Grey Team
- Shield: Not Found

=== Episode 5: Farm Frenzy ===
Aired: Wednesday, April 8, 2009

Location: Vermilion, Alberta

Tasks	1st place	2nd place	3rd place	4th place	5th place	6th Place
Pig Injections	Purple	Red	Brown	Yellow	Grey	Orange
Move Haybale	Purple	Red	Orange	Yellow	Brown	Grey
Milk a Cow	Purple	Red	Yellow «	Brown »	Grey	Orange
Finding Clue Card and Crossing the Finish Line	Purple (Wrench)	Red (Big Reward)	Yellow	Brown	Grey	Orange (Eliminated)

- Prize: Speedpass to "Galaxy Land" Amusement Park in West Edmonton Mall
- Wrench Used on: Yellow Team
- Shield: Not Found

=== Episode 6: Firefighting ===
Aired: Wednesday, April 15, 2009

Location: Vermilion, Alberta

Tasks	1st place	2nd place	3rd place	4th place	5th place
Moving Hose	Purple	Red	Grey	Yellow	Brown
Smoke Escape	Yellow	Purple »	Brown	Red «	Grey
Putting Out Flames	Purple	Yellow	Red	Brown	Grey
Finding Clue Card and Crossing the Finish Line	Purple (Big Reward)	Yellow (Wrench)	Red	Brown (Eliminated)	Grey ♦

- Prize: Hot Air Balloon Ride
- Wrench Used On: Red Team
- Shield: Not Found/ Used by Grey Team (Isiah & Jaicyea)

Notes

- At the start of the experience, Sabrina gave the remaining teams an opportunity to split from their teammates, and pair up with someone else
- Both Isiah and Landon from the Grey Team, Aaron from the Red Team, and Graeme from the Brown Team stepped up - the Purple and Yellow Teams stayed together
- Aaron and Graeme became the new Red Team, Jaiceya and Isiah became the new Grey Team, and Landon and Tyler became the new Brown Team
- Because Aaron and Jaicyea had a Shield and split up as a team, both challengers took Shields into their new teams - Aaron (Red Team) and Jaicyea (Grey Team)

=== Episode 7: ER ===
Aired: Wednesday, April 22, 2009

Location: Montreal, Quebec

Tasks	1st place	2nd place	3rd place	4th place
Saving Mannequin	Purple	Yellow	Red	Grey
Stitching Pig Foot	Purple	Yellow ♦	Red	Grey
Saving Second Patient	Purple «	Yellow »	Red	Grey
Finding Clue Card and Crossing the Finish Line	Purple (Wrench)	Red (Big Reward)	Yellow	Grey (Eliminated)

- Prize: Nintendo Wii with Trauma Centre: New Blood
- Wrench Used On: Purple Team
- Shield: Found by Yellow Team (Talon & Maddison)

=== Episode 8: Dirty Jobs ===
Aired: Wednesday, April 29, 2009

Location: Côte Saint-Luc & Montreal, Quebec

Tasks	1st place	2nd place	3rd place
Garbage Collecting	Purple	Red	Yellow
Vacuuming Garbage	Red	Purple »	Yellow «
Compacting and Covering Garbage	Yellow	Purple ♦	Red
Finding Clue Card and Crossing the Finish Line	Yellow (Big Reward)	Purple ♦	Red ♦ (Non-Elimination)

- Prize:
- Wrench Used On: Yellow Team
- Shield: Found by Purple Team (Ben & Ruby-Rae)/ Used by Purple Team (Ben & Ruby-Rae) and Red Team (Aaron & Graeme)

Note:

- At the end of this experience, teams were dissolved. The challengers would compete individually beginning in the next experience.
- Because teams were dissolved, the Shield found by the Yellow Team (Talon & Maddison) in experience 7 was discarded.
- All teams in this experience had a shield by the 3rd job

=== Episode 9: The Circus ===
Aired: Wednesday, May 6, 2009

Location: Montreal, Quebec

Tasks	1st place	2nd place	3rd place	4th place	5th place	6th Place
Tight Rope and Riding Bike	Aaron	Talon	Ruby-Rae	Ben	Graeme	Maddison
Trampoline Routine	Aaron	Talon♦	Ruby-Rae	Ben	Graeme	Maddison
Live Performance	Aaron	Talon	Ruby-Rae	Ben	Graeme	Maddison
Finding Clue Card and Crossing the Finish Line	Talon (Big Reward)	Ruby-Rae (Wrench)	Ben	Graeme	Maddison	Aaron (Eliminated)

- Prize: iPod Nano
- Shield: Found by Talon

=== Episode 10: Adventure Guides ===
Aired: Wednesday, May 13, 2009

Location: Whistler, British Columbia

Tasks	1st place	2nd place	3rd place	4th place	5th place
Kayak Race	Talon	Graeme	Maddison	Ben	Ruby-Rae
Forest Navigation	Talon	Ruby-Rae »	Ben «	Maddison	Graeme
Tent Set-Up	Ruby-Rae	Ben	Maddison	Talon	Graeme
Finding Clue Card and Crossing the Finish Line	Ruby-Rae (Big Reward)	Ben (Wrench)	Talon	Maddison	Graeme (Eliminated)

- Prize: Inflatable Kayak
- Wrench Used On: Ben
- Shield: Not Found

=== Episode 11: Police Action ===
Aired: Wednesday, May 20, 2009
Location: Vancouver, British Columbia

Tasks	1st place	2nd place	3rd place	4th place
Police Boat Rescue	Maddison	Ben	Ruby-Rae	Talon
Finding Counterfeit Money	Maddison	Ben »	Ruby-Rae	Talon «
Finding Clue Card and Crossing the Finish Line	Maddison (Big Reward)	Ruby-Rae (Wrench)	Ben (Eliminated)	Talon ♦

- Prize: Binoculars
- Wrench Used On: Talon
- Shield: Not Found/ Used by Talon

=== Episode 12: Elite Forces ===
Aired: Wednesday, May 27, 2009

Location: Chesapeake, Virginia

Tasks	1st place	2nd place	3rd place
Shoot Paintball Targets	Ruby-Rae »	Talon «	Maddison
Build a Fire and Boil Water	Maddison	Ruby-Rae	Talon
Find and Rescue Dummies	Maddison ♦	Ruby-Rae	Talon
Finding Clue Card and Crossing the Finish Line	Maddison (Big Reward)	Ruby-Rae (Wrench)	Talon (Eliminated)

- Prize: Paintball Party for 16
- Wrench Used On: Talon
- Shield: Found by Maddison

Notes:

- This was the final experience in which a Shield could be used.
- With Talon's elimination, All male challengers have been eliminated from the season.

=== Episode 13: Pilots ===
Aired: June 3, 2009

Location: La Jolla, San Diego, California and the Mojave Desert

Tasks	Ruby-Rae	Maddison
Hit Targets While Paragliding	1 Point »	«
Aircraft Escape	1 Point	-
Barrel Rolls	-	3 Points
Dogfight Advantage	Maddison^{1}	
Dogfight (First Attempt)	Hit^{1}	Hit^{1(2)}
Dogfight (Second Attempt)	Champion	Quit

- Champion: Ruby-Rae
- Runner-Up: Maddison
- Prize: $15,000 scholarship, Trip for 4 to Hawaii
- Consolation Prize: Laptop
- Wrench Used on: Maddison

Notes:

- The first three challenges were scored by points. The first challenger to 3 points would receive an advantage of a bonus "hit" in the final challenge - the Dogfight.
- In the Dogfight, the challengers would alternate their roles as the "attacking plane" and the "defending plane." The first challenger to 3 hits would win the competition.
- During the Second Dogfight, Maddison quit, resulting in Ruby-Rae winning the competition.

== Season 1 Records ==
Record	Challenger(s)	Number
Champion (Winner)	Ruby-Rae	13 Experiences
Most Experience Wins	Ruby-Rae	6 Experiences
Most Top Two Finishes	Ruby-Rae	12 Experiences
Most Wrenches Won	Ruby-Rae	7 Times
Most Times Wrenched	Talon	5 Times
Most Big Rewards Won	Ruby-Rae & Maddison H	3 Times
Most Shields Found	Maddison H	2 Times
