= An Insignificant Harvey =

- Directed by: Jeff Kopas
- Written by: Jeff Kopas
- Produced by: Jeff Kopas; Daniel Zuccala
- Starring: Jordan Prentice; Kristin Adams; Steven McCarthy; Art Hindle
- Cinematography: Cabot McNenly
- Edited by: Stuart A. McIntyre; Dev Singh
- Music by: Michael Berec
- Release date: 2011
- Running time: 79 minutes
- Country: Canada
- Language: English

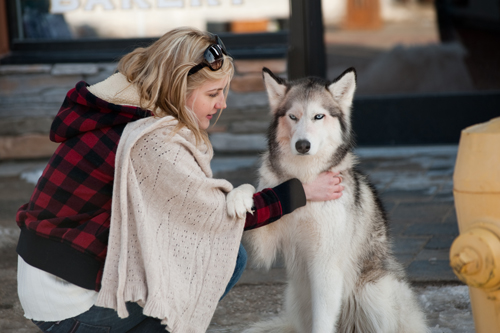
Inca and Dakota. Shot on location in Collingwood, ON Canada in April 2009

An Insignificant Harvey is a 2011 independent Canadian drama film. The film made its world premiere at the Busan International Film Festival in South Korea. The feature-length directorial debut by Canadian director Jeff Kopas, the film profiles the life of Harvey Lippe, a janitor at a small town ski resort, who also happens to be a little person, who has his life dramatically change when he finds a stray husky and falls for an exotic dancer.

The film stars Jordan Prentice as Harvey, Kristin Adams as Dakota, and Steven McCarthy as Lucas.

== Cast ==
- Jordan Prentice as Harvey Lippé
- Kristin Adams as Dakota Dixon
- Steven McCarthy as Lucas Harold
- Art Hindle as Father Asher
- Inca Kopas as Inca
- Philip Williams as Paul Lalone
- Eli Ham as Jason Lalone
- Lee Rumohr as Adam Kane
