= Josh Beech =

English-American indie rock singer, songwriter, musician, photographer and model

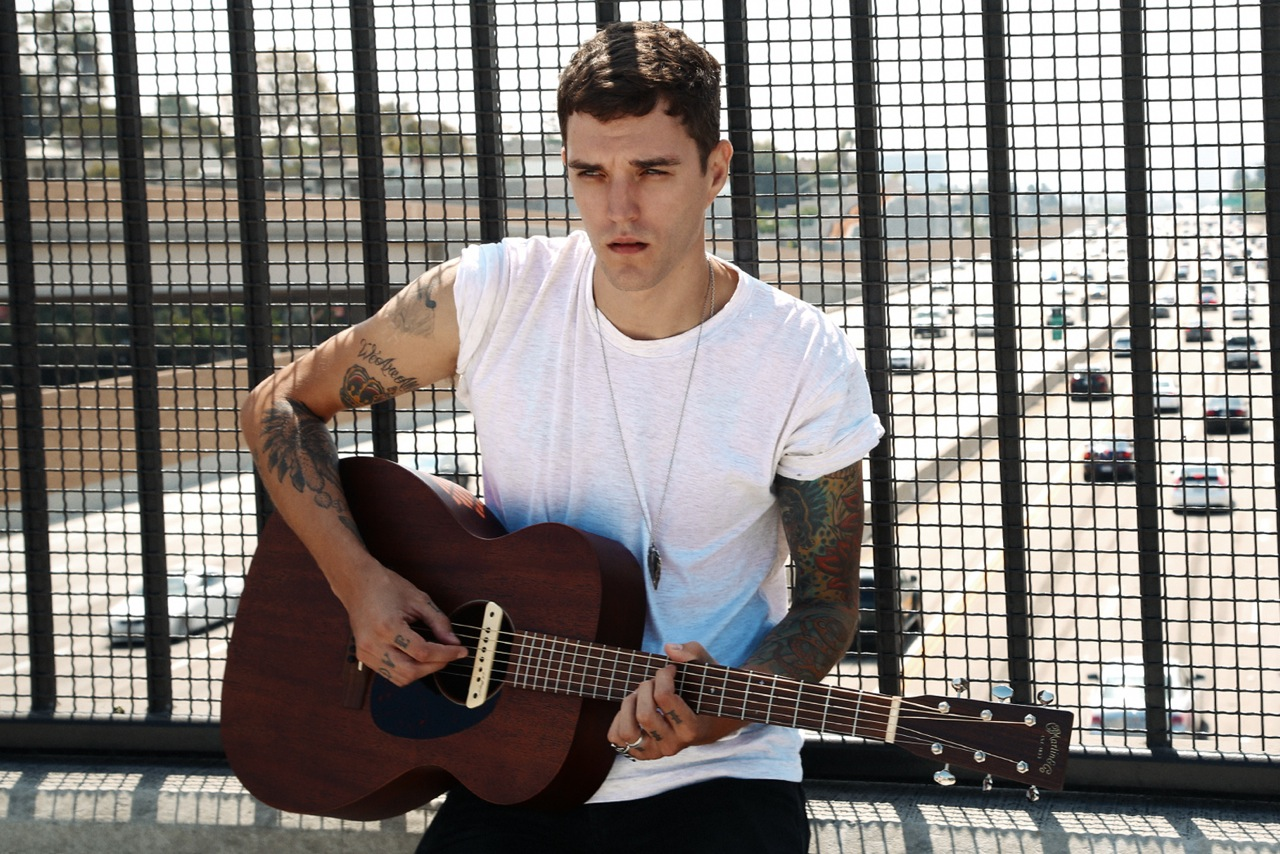
- Born: Joshua William Beech; 26 December 1985 (age 40); Bromley, London, England
- Occupations: Photographer; Creative Director; Singer; songwriter; musician
- Years active: 2008–present
- Spouse: Shenae Grimes (m. 2013)
- Children: 2
- Musical career
- Genres: indie rock, punk rock, alternative
- Instruments: Vocals; guitar
- Website: joshbeechmusic.com

Joshua William Beech (born 26 December 1985) is an English indie rock singer, songwriter, musician, photographer and former model. As a photographer Josh is known worldwide for his black and white portraiture of famous musicians as well as shooting and creative directing global fashion campaigns and editorials. As a model, he is signed to major agencies across the world and has appeared in campaigns and shows for brands such as Givenchy, Burberry, Moschino, Valentino, John Galliano, Tommy Hilfiger, and more. He has also been featured on the cover of Vogue Hommes International, as well as in editorials for i-D Magazine, GQ Italy, Vogue Italia, and Dazed & Confused Magazine. Josh was ranked for multiple years in the top 10 model rankings (models.com).

Beech is signed to Universal Music Group with his namesake band Beech, whose song "Lovers" became a top 40 hit in Germany, Switzerland, Austria and France.

Beech's first solo EP, Fight Strong, released in 2015 was a success in Europe with the lead self titled single climbing to the top 5 in the MTV Italia music charts.

Josh currently has no plans to release new music and is a full time photographer and creative director.

== Early life and music career ==
Beech was born in Bromley in South East London, England. He always wanted to be a musician, playing keyboard at age 10 and guitar at 13. At 16, wanting to form a band but not knowing any vocalists, he began to sing. He became an apprentice at a British acoustic guitar company for a time, also studying music in college.

Beech played in punk bands for years, experimenting with various genres and groups before forming Beech, his band with musical collaborator Oliver Som. The band is signed to Universal Music Group in Germany and Virgin/EMI in the UK; their song "Lovers" made it to number 12 on the German mainstream radio charts in 2013. The song was also featured in the Warner Brothers Pictures family film Keinohrhase und Zweiohrkuken. Their album Letters Written in the Sky is available for purchase worldwide.

Since 2018, Beech has released three singles: "No Trouble", "Left Behind", and "American Current".

== Modeling ==
Beech was scouted as a model by Sherrill Smith at a festival in 2007, soon booking a campaign for Burberry. Rapid bookings followed thereafter, including a record three campaigns for Levi's 501 jeans, as well as the cover of Vogue Hommes International, which was taken by Hedi Slimane. His client list has since expanded to include John Galliano, Valentino, Thierry Mugler, H&M, Moschino, Diesel, Givenchy, Topman, and Tommy Hilfiger, among many others.

He is signed to DNA Model Management, Chapter London, Success Models, and NEXT.

== Personal life ==
Beech married 90210 actress Shenae Grimes on 10 May 2013, in Ashford, Kent. On 27 September 2018, the couple had a daughter named Bowie Scarlett. On 20 December 2019, Beech announced on his Instagram page that he had become an American citizen. On 13 August 2021, the couple had a boy named Kingsley Taylor.
