= Banshee (film) =

- Promotional poster
- Written by: Kirsten Elms (Kirsten McCallion)
- Directed by: Kari Skogland
- Starring: Taryn Manning
- Music by: Ned Bouhalassa
- Country of origin: United States
- Original language: English

Production
- Producer: Kim Berlin
- Cinematography: David Franco
- Editor: Benjamin Duffield
- Running time: 95 minutes

Original release
- Release: June 24, 2006

Banshee is a 2006 American television drama film directed by Kari Skogland, starring Taryn Manning. Following its TV premiere it had a DVD release in several countries.

== Plot ==
Sage Rion, daughter of a deceased garage owner, is a professional car thief. The police know her, but have always failed to convict her. Due to her aptitude to elude the police she is notoriously known as "The Banshee".

One day everything changes when she steals a distinct vintage car (a 66 Dodge Charger) right before a date. Lacking in concentration, she drops her ID card at the crime scene and doesn't realize it.

After she has delivered the car to her fence she returns home only to find a threatening letter. The owner of the stolen car has kidnapped her lover and demands his car back.

Sage brings the car back to the parking area where she stole it and hopes that her lover will be released in exchange. Instead, she finds in her flat two police officers and her lover's corpse.

The police consider her the number one suspect and try to arrest her. She barely escapes and starts an investigation of her own. Hunted by police and by her furious fence, she tracks down the murderer, who turns out to be a serial killer.

Sage saves a cop, Oliver Fitzgerald, from being run over by a train, so he begins to trust her and believes she couldn't have murdered her boyfriend. She tracks the 66 Burgundy Charger, to a maintenance man called John Larch and pays him a visit, but is spotted and escapes before being caught by Larch. She tells the cop Oliver about it, who goes up to Larch's attic and finds DVD recordings of screams, presumably those of his victims and shows them to his chief. Police discover that Friedling is Larch's real last name and enter a hotel room where he stays.

After being captured by her own gang, Sage manages to free herself and goes back home to realize Brenna was at a night club. She visits the night club and learns from the Bartender that Brenna was with the DJ last night. She follows the DJ to a hotel room and finds Brenna's necklace and pictures of various missing girls. She frees Brenna from a locked box and lowers her down the elevator shaft via a firehose.

Oliver arrives there and fights with Larch with help from Sage. Larch is struck one last time with a hammer by Sage before falling down dead. Sage and Oliver walk out exhausted.

== Cast ==
- Taryn Manning as Sage Rion
- Romano Orzari as Eddie Rindall
- Michael Lombardi as Oliver "Fitz" Fitzgerald
- Genelle Williams as Brenna
- Christian Campbell as John Larch
- Tony Calabretta as Mitch Murray
- Morgan Kelly as Tony Romano
- Bronwen Mantel as Mildred Totty
- Nicolas Wright as Jack

== Production ==
Due to the tight schedule Taryn Manning refused to be doubled for the stunts as she later confirmed in an interview.

== Reception ==
New York Post's Linda Stasi considered the film "a new take on chick flicks" but described the story as "flawed". Variety's Laura Fries dismissed the film as "ridiculous, exploitative and downright creepy". David Johnson judged for "DVD Verdict" that Taryn Manning proved herself "more than capable" of carrying the film but he also objected the script as not completely logical.
