= In Real Life (TV series) =

- Created by: Jonathan Finkelstein
- Presented by: Sabrina Jalees
- Country of origin: Canada
- Original language: English
- No. of seasons: 3
- No. of episodes: 33(+2 webisodes)

Production
- Executive producer: Jonathan Patel
- Production company: Apartment 11 Productions

Original release
- Network: YTV; CBC
- Release: March 4, 2009 – December 12, 2011

In Real Life (formerly known as In the Real World) is a Canadian reality show where eighteen young contestants aged 12–14 race across North America and compete in a series of real-life tasks, aimed to "discover the skills, strength, and stamina it takes to make it in real life." The show is developed and produced by Apartment 11 Productions. The show is hosted by Canadian comedian and actress, Sabrina Jalees.

The first season of In Real Life was nominated for the Shaw Rocket Prize in 2010. Sabrina Jalees was nominated as "Best Host in a Pre-School, Children's or Youth Program or Series" in the 2009 Gemini Awards. The show was nominated for "Best Children's or Youth Non-Fiction Program or Series" in the 2011 Gemini Awards. In 2011, Mark Lawrence, the director of In Real Life was nominated for a Leo Award for "Best Direction in a Youth or Children's Program or Series".

The first season was originally planned to premiere on February 4, 2009, as In the Real World but was delayed one month. The first season premiered on March 4, 2009. The second season premiered on October 4, 2010. The third season of the series premiered on October 3, 2011.

== Overview ==
Each season of In Real Life features eighteen kids, aged 12–14, from across Canada competing throughout North America in various real life jobs. At the start of each season, the eighteen challengers are paired up into nine teams of two and given team colours (red, orange, yellow, green, blue, teal, purple, grey, and brown (seasons 1, 2), or pink (season 3)).

In each experience, the challengers compete in three (or more) tasks related to one job in the real world. Each experience also contains a hidden "Shield", which a team can find and use to protect themselves from elimination. The first team/challenger to cross the finish line at the end of each experience is given the choice between two prizes: the "Big Reward" for instant gratification or the "Wrench" which will slow another team down in the next experience. The second team/challenger to cross the finish line receives whichever prize the first team turned down. The last team/challenger to cross the finish line is usually eliminated, unless they possess a "Shield" (and the second last team doesn't) or it is a non-elimination experience (season 1). The shield cannot be used more than once in the competition but if you find it you can keep it for the whole competition. When five teams remain in the competition, they will have the opportunity to split up and pair up with a new teammate. When three teams are left, the teams are dissolved and the challengers will compete as solo competitors.

The winner will receive the title of "In Real Life Champion", college tuition money, and an all-expenses-paid family vacation.

== Seasons ==
Season	Premiere date	Finale date	Contestants	Winner	Runner(s)-Up	Episodes
In Real Life	March 4, 2009	June 3, 2009	18	Ruby-Rae Rogawski	Maddison Hartloff	13
In Real Life 2	October 4, 2010	December 6, 2010	18	Tea Vlatkovic	Sam Mantin	10 + 1 webisode
In Real Life 2	October 4, 2010	December 6, 2010	18	Tea Vlatkovic	Christian van Vilet	10 + 1 webisode
In Real Life 3	October 3, 2011	December 12, 2011	18	Zachary Tng	Sydney Reynolds	10 + 1 webisode

== Awards and nominations ==
Year	Award	Category	Result
2009	Gemini Awards	Sabrina Jalees, Best Host in a Pre-School, Children's Youth Program or Series	Nominated
2010	Shaw Rocket Prize	Best Children's, Youth, or Family Program	Nominated
2011	Leo Awards	Mark Lawrence, Best Direction in a Youth or Children's Program or Series	Nominated
2011	Youth Media Alliance Awards of Excellence	Best Convergent Interactive Content	Nominated
2011	Gemini Awards	Best Children's or Youth Non-Fiction Program or Series	Nominated
2012	Digi Awards	Best in Cross-Platform - Kids	Won
2012	Kidscreen Awards	Viewer's Choice for Best Tweens/Teens Program	Won
2012	Kidscreen Awards	Best Tweens/Teens Companion Website	Nominated
2013	Kidscreen Awards	Best Tweens/Teens Non-Animated or Mixed Series	Won
2013	International Emmy Kids Awards	Best Non-Scripted Entertainment	Nominated
2013	Canadian Screen Awards	Best Cross-Platform Project – Children's and Youth	Nominated
2013	Canadian Screen Awards	Claire Cappelletti, Best Writing in a Lifestyle or Reality/Competition Program or Series	Nominated
2013	Youth Media Alliance Awards of Excellence	Awards of Excellence for Best Television Program, All Genres, Teen Category	Won
2013	Youth Media Alliance Awards of Excellence	Parents' Award	Nominated

== Records ==
Record	Challenger(s)	Season	Number
Most Experience Wins	Ruby-Rae	Season 1	6 Experiences
Most Top Two Finishes	Ruby-Rae	Season 1	12 Experiences
Most Wrenches Won	Ruby-Rae	Season 1	7 Times
Most Times Wrenched^{3}	Talon	Season 1	5 Times
Most Times Wrenched^{3}	Andreas & Kelly	Season 3	2 Times
Most Big Rewards Won^{4}	Ruby-Rae & Maddison H	Season 1	3 Times
Most Big Rewards Won^{4}	Sam & Amber	Season 2	3 Times
Most Big Rewards Won^{4}	Abhinav	Season 3	3 Times
Most Shields Found	Maddison H & Talon	Season 1	2 Times

^3 Talon holds the record for most times wrenched throughout the series, 5, whereas Kelly and Andreas hold the record for most times wrenched in a single experience, 2 times.

^4 Ruby-Rae, Maddison H, Sam, Amber, and Abhinav all tied for this record.
