= The Cross Road =

- Original film poster
- Directed by: Alexandra Thompson
- Written by: Alexandra Thompson
- Produced by: Jordana Aarons
- Starring: Garen Boyajian; Shenae Grimes; Bruce Gooch
- Cinematography: Billy Buttery
- Edited by: Ron Wisman
- Music by: Eric Robertson; Claude Desjardin
- Distributed by: Akits Films
- Release date: December 4, 2008 (Monaco International Film Festival)
- Running time: 48 minutes
- Country: United States
- Language: English

The Cross Road is a 2008 drama film written and directed by Alexandra Thompson. Starring Shenae Grimes as Bridget and Garen Boyajian as Salaam, it is a story of love and intolerance.

== Synopsis ==
The Cross Road is a modern Romeo and Juliet type of story. The Syrian Ahmed family has recently immigrated to the States and chooses to live in Middle America. The family is confronted by the Monroes, an American family who has a great distrust of foreigners, particularly Arabs. Walker Monroe (Bruce Gooch) wants to drive the Syrian family out of their town. Meanwhile, Salaam (Garen Boyajian), the young son of the immigrants has fallen in love with the American family's daughter Bridget (Shenae Grimes). Walker recruits a fatherless teen next door to help him drive the Ahmeds out of his town but in doing so he jeopardizes Salaam's life and his own daughter's happiness.

== Cast ==
- Garen Boyajian as Salaam
- Shenae Grimes as Bridget
- Bruce Gooch as Walker
- Tommy Lioutas as Chris
- Allan Aarons as Costa
- Terry C. Barna as Police Officer #1
- Richard Blackburn as Principal
- Callahan Connor as Steve
- Susan Greenfield as Jane
- Cecilia Jalaidan as Laila
- Sabrina Jalees as Muslim Gi
- Keira Loughran as Art Teacher
- Sean O'Neil as Paul
- Farzad Sadrian as Ali

== Awards and nominations ==
Wins

- Actor Garen Boyajian, winner of "Best Male Actor" at the Monaco International Film Festival for his role in the film as Salaam
- Actors Garen Boyajian, Shenae Grimes, Tommy Lioutas, Bruce Gooch and Sean O'Neill, co-winners of "Best Ensemble Cast" at the same festival
- Director Alexandra Thompson won the AFA Award at the 2008 Angel Film Awards

Nominations

- The film was also nominated for the "Golden Aphrodite Award" at the Cyprus International Film Festival.
