= Jeff Kopas =

Canadian film director

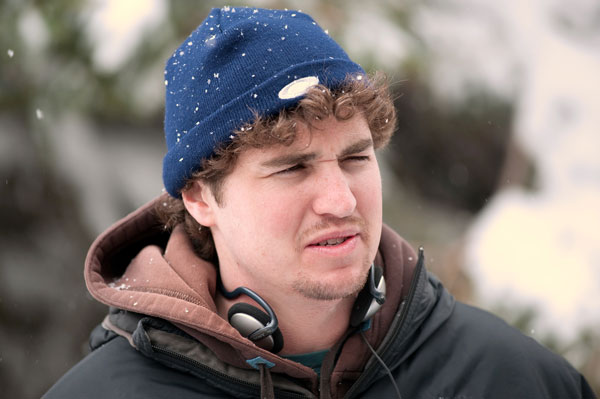
- Kopas directing An Insignificant Harvey
- Born: January 23, 1975 (age 51); Toronto, Ontario, Canada
- Occupations: Writer, producer, director
- Years active: 2001–present
- Spouse: Jen Watson

Jeff Kopas (born January 23, 1975) is a Canadian writer, film director, and producer.

== Early life ==
Kopas grew up in Toronto and attended high school at Royal St. George's College downtown and then Trinity College School in Port Hope, Ontario. He attended Queen's University in Kingston and finished University at Herstmonceux Castle in England, where he received a Bachelor of Arts. After graduating he traveled abroad worked odd jobs until in 2006 he made an hour-long documentary on his climb of Kilimanjaro and sold it to National Geographic, his first professional film. He was then accepted into a directing course at New York University's Tisch School of the Arts, after which he completed six short films (his last being the Bravo Film Dogasaur which was short listed to be placed in the Guggenheim museums, and is distributed by Ouat Media and Shorts International). He directed a variety of nationally broadcast commercial spots and completed several more documentaries.

== Career ==
His first feature film was An Insignificant Harvey, in 2011. The film was picked up by Film Movement for US release at the Sundance Film Festival, it is distributed internationally by Shoreline Entertainment, and in Canada by KinoSmith. The film premiered at the Busan International Film Festival in South Korea. and had an extended national theatrical release across Canada that fall. The film was executive produced by Oscar Winning Producer Don Carmody (Chicago).

He directed his second feature film, the psychological thriller Blood Honey in 2015, co-written with Douglas Taylor and co-produced with Robert Budreau (Born to Be Blue) in 2015. It was released theatrically in Canada by Northern Banner in the fall of 2017. Super Channel purchased the Canadian broadcast rights and Tricoast Entertainment released the film in the United States in the winter of 2018 with Spotlight Pictures taking the international rights at AFM American Film Market. To promote the film, he and his team staged a publicity stunt the day of the public premiere at Yonge-Dundas Square (now Sankofa Square) in downtown Toronto. The stunt involved a twenty-foot inflatable bubble into which they transported four sealed beehives. A beekeeper then opened the hives and over the course of two hours he placed thousands of live bees on a volunteer's entire head (and face), successfully breaking a Guinness record.

He is an alumnus of the Toronto Film Festival Studio Program 2016 and TAP Trans-Atlantic Partners producing program 2016.

In 2017 he began to focus on the creation and development of scripted television, with his first project being a limited series based on the Freedom Riders movement, developed with Alicia Keys and the producer of the documentary Freedom Riders (film) Laurens Grant, which was optioned by Freeform (ABC/Disney) and was in development as of 2018.

== Feature filmography ==
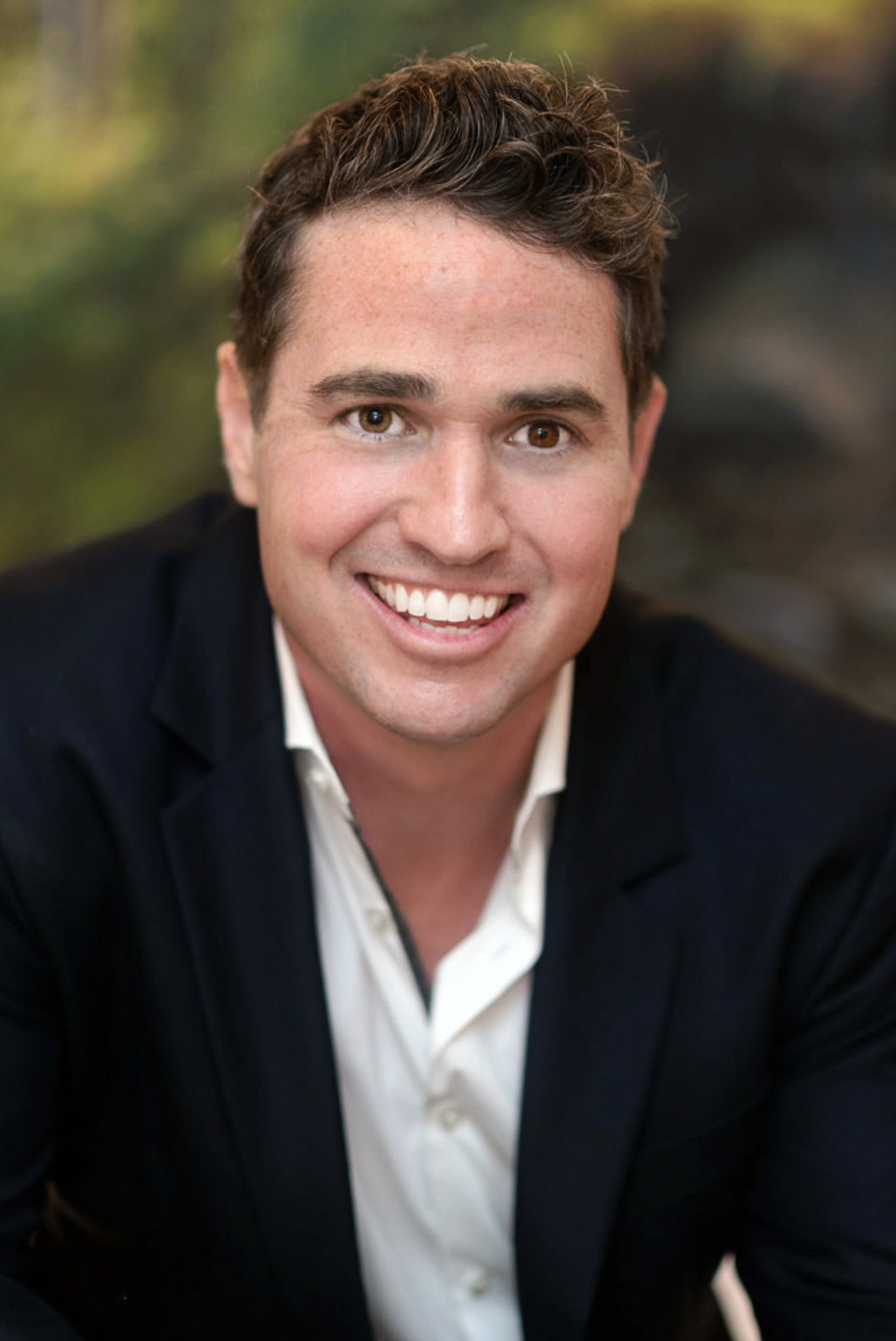
Filmmaker Jeff Kopas

Year	Title	Credited as			Notes
Year	Title	Director	Writer	Producer	Notes
2011	An Insignificant Harvey	Yes	Yes	Yes	Co-produced with Daniel Zuccala
2017	Blood Honey	Yes	Yes	Yes	Co-wrote with Doug Taylor and Co-produced with Robert Budreau and Ryan Reaney
