= Giancarlo Caltabiano =

Canadian actor

- Born: April 6, 1976 (age 50); Canada
- Occupation: Actor
- Years active: 1998–2013

Giancarlo Caltabiano (born April 6, 1976) is a Canadian former actor and entrepreneur, best known as George S. Goodwin III on Radio Active and Ben Shaw on Fries with That?.

Since leaving acting, Caltabiano has operated Chez Geeks, a games shop in Montreal.

== Filmography ==
Television & Films
Year	Title	Role	Notes
2013	The Punisher: No Mercy	Vinnie Rizzo	Short
2011	Another Silence	Young Man at Tony's	Movie
2010–present	Board to Death	Himself - Host	91 episodes
2008	Memory Lanes	Chester Wallace	TV movie
2008	Journey to the Center of the Earth	Leonard	Movie
2007	Moose TV	Small Man	1 episode
2006	Banshee	Jamie	TV movie
2005	Pure	Jamie	Movie
2004	Fries with That?	Ben Shaw	52 episodes
2004	Il Duce Canadese	Tano	TV mini-series
2002	The Last Chapter	Paul O'Connors	TV mini-series
2002	Obsessed	Ozzy the Peep Show Manager	TV movie
2002	Galidor: Defenders of the Outer Dimension	Gropert of the Altans	1 episode
2002	Abandon	Trip Hop Inferno: Dante	Movie
1998–2001	Radio Active	George S. Goodwin III	78 episodes
2000	The List	Teenager #1	Movie
1999	Bonanno: A Godfather	Joe Valachi (Young)	TV movie
1998	The Mystery Files of Shelby Woo	Chip / Reggie In Goofy Snout	2 episodes
