= In Real Life season 2 =

In Real Life
- Season 2
- No. of episodes: 10 (+1 Webisode)

Release
- Original network: YTV
- Original release: October 4 – December 6, 2010

Season chronology
- ← Previous; Season 1 Next → Season 3

In Real Life is a Canadian reality show in which eighteen young contestants aged 12–14 race across North America and compete in a series of real-life jobs, aimed to "discover the skills, strength, and stamina it takes to make it in real life." The show is developed and produced by Apartment 11 Productions.

The second season premiered on YTV on October 4, 2010 and the season finale aired on December 6.

The winner was 13-year-old Tea Vlatkovic from Niagara Falls, Ontario.

New to this season was the introduction of the Final Webisode, which aired exclusively on YTV.com.

== Contestants ==
Contestant	Team colour			Status
Contestant	Week 1	Week 2 – 7	Week 8 – 10	Status
Tea Vlatkovic, 13, Niagara Falls, Ontario	Purple Team		Solo	Winner
Sam Mantin, 14, Guelph, Ontario	Teal Team		Solo	Runners-Up
Christian van Vliet, 14, Inuvik, NWT	Green Team		Solo	Runners-Up
Amber Cotton, 13, Alberton, PEI	Red Team	Purple Team	Solo	Eliminated 9th
Remington Latanville, 13, Weston, Ontario	Green Team		Solo	Eliminated 8th
Allison Panizales, 14, Newmarket, Ontario	Teal Team		Not In; Competition	Eliminated 7th
Shelby Glaze, 14, Regina, Saskatchewan	Grey Team		Not In; Competition	Eliminated 6th
Eric Choi, 13, Vaughan, Ontario	Grey Team		Not In; Competition	Eliminated 6th
Bryanne Hordal, 12, Edmonton, Alberta	Yellow Team		Not In; Competition	Eliminated 5th
Tanner Shantz, 14, London, Ontario	Yellow Team		Not In; Competition	Eliminated 5th
Vanessa Perruzza, 13, Mississauga, Ontario	Brown Team		Not In; Competition	Eliminated 4th
David Krasinski, 12, Guelph, Ontario	Brown Team		Not In; Competition	Eliminated 4th
Sarah Mpoyi, 12, Toronto, Ontario	Blue Team		Not In; Competition	Eliminated 3rd
Daniel St-Onge , 13, Sainte-Thérèse, Quebec	Blue Team		Not In; Competition	Eliminated 3rd
Muhaddisah Batool, 14, Mississauga, Ontario	Orange Team		Not In; Competition	Eliminated 2nd
Tristen Lee, 13, St. John’s, NL	Orange Team		Not In; Competition	Eliminated 2nd
Jumoke Guy, 12, Toronto, Ontario	Red Team	Not In; Competition	Not In; Competition	Eliminated 1st
Eric Zhang, 12, Vancouver, British Columbia	Purple Team	Not In; Competition	Not In; Competition	Eliminated 1st

- Ages at time of filming

== Results ==
Contestant	Position (by experience)										Average
Contestant	1	2^{5}	3	4	5	6	7^{6}	8^{7}	9	10	Average
Tea	5th	1st^{2}	6th»	3rd«	2nd^{1}	2nd^{1}	2nd	1st^{2}	2nd^{2}»	1st»	2.50
Sam	8th	2nd^{1}	1st^{1}	5th^{3}	4th«	1st^{2}«	3rd»	3rd	1st^{1}	2nd	3.00
Christian	4th	7th«	2nd^{2}	4th»	1st^{2}	4th^{3}»	1st«^{1}	4th	3rd«	2nd«	3.20
Amber	9th	1st^{2}	6th»	3rd«	2nd^{1}	2nd^{1}	2nd	2nd^{1}	4th		3.44
Remington	4th	7th«	2nd^{2}	4th»	1st^{2}	4th^{3}»	1st«^{1}	5th			3.50
Allison	8th	2nd^{1}	1st^{1}	5th^{3}	4th«	1st^{2}«	3rd»				3.43
Shelby	2nd^{2}	4th»	5th	2nd^{2}	3rd»	3rd					3.17
Eric C	2nd^{2}	4th»	5th	2nd^{2}	3rd»	3rd					3.17
Bryanne	6th^{3}	6th	4th	1st^{1}	5th						4.40
Tanner	6th^{3}	6th	4th	1st^{1}	5th						4.40
Vanessa	1st^{1}	5th	3rd«	6th							3.75
David	1st^{1}	5th	3rd«	6th							3.75
Sarah	7th	3rd	7th								5.67
Daniel	7th	3rd	7th								5.67
Muhaddisah	3rd	8th									5.50
Tristen	3rd	8th									5.50
Jumoke	9th										9.00
Eric Z	WD^{4}										N/A

^1 This contestant won the big reward
^2 This contestant won the wrench
^3 This contestant found the shield
^4 This contestant withdrew from the competition due to an injury
^5 Some contestants received a new team member. The original teams were:
Red Team: Amber and Jumoke
Purple Team: Tea and Eric Z.
^6 Only one contestant was eliminated during this episode as there was a showdown between the two contestants of the last team. The winner of this showdown would then continue on in the competition
^7 Beginning in this experience, all teams were dissolved and competitors competed alone
Red means the contestant was eliminated.
Dark Red means the contestant used a shield but was eliminated.
Orange means the contestant competed in a duel but was eliminated.
Purple means the contestant used the shield to escape elimination.
Violet means the contestant won a duel to escape elimination.
Pink means the contestant was chosen as a replacement partner to escape elimination.
Gold means the contestant won the competition.
Silver means the contestant was the runner-up.
» represents the contestant who used the wrench, « represents the contestant who got delayed by it.

== Episode Summary ==
=== Episode 1: Wilderness Rescuers ===
Airdate: October 4, 2010

Location: Elora, Ontario

Tasks	1st place	2nd place	3rd place	4th place	5th place	6th place	7th place	8th place	9th place
River Rescue	Teal	Red	Purple	Blue	Green	Orange	Brown , Grey , Yellow ♦		
Mountaintop Rescue	Teal	Grey	Brown	Green	Yellow	Orange	Blue	Red	Purple
Gorge Rescue	Brown	Teal	Grey	Green	Orange	Yellow	Blue	Purple	Red
Finding Clue Card and Crossing the Finish Line	Brown (Big Reward)	Grey (Wrench)	Orange	Green	Purple	Yellow	Blue	Teal	Red (Jumoke Eliminated)

- Eric Zhang of Purple Team withdrew due to injury, and his partner Tea managed to cross the finish line on her own. Red Team came in last, and Tea picked Amber from Red Team to be her new partner, so only Jumoke was eliminated.
- Prize: Camping Set
- Shield: Found by Yellow Team (Bryanne & Tanner)

=== Episode 2: Spies ===
Airdate: October 11, 2010

Location: Montréal and Sainte-Catherine, Quebec

Tasks	1st place	2nd place	3rd place	4th place	5th place	6th place	7th place	8th place
Installing Spying Devices	Purple	Blue	Teal	Green	Grey	Brown	Yellow	Orange
Collecting Intelligence and Finding SuperDelux Icecream	Purple	Green «	Yellow	Teal	Brown	Blue	Grey	Orange
Going Through A Room; While Avoiding Laser Beams	Purple	Teal	Yellow	Blue	Orange	Green	Brown	Grey
Finding Clue Card and Crossing the Finish Line	Purple (Wrench)	Teal (Big Reward)	Blue	Grey	Brown	Yellow	Green	Orange (Eliminated)

- Prize: Portable Video iWear
- Wrench Used on: Green Team
- Shield: Not Found

=== Episode 3: Chefs ===
Airdate: October 18, 2010

Location: Montréal, Québec

Tasks	1st place	2nd place	3rd place	4th place	5th place	6th place	7th place
Butchering a Chicken	Purple »	Teal , Brown « , Blue			Green , Yellow , Grey		
Making a Dish	Teal , Blue		Purple , Brown , Green			Yellow	Grey
Making Parfait	Teal	Yellow	Brown	Green	Grey	Purple	Blue
Finding Clue Card and Crossing the Finish Line	Teal (Big Reward)	Green (Wrench)	Brown	Yellow	Grey	Purple	Blue (Eliminated)

- Prize: Digital Camera
- Wrench Used on: Brown Team
- Shield: Not Found

=== Episode 4: World Class Athletes ===
Airdate: October 25, 2010

Location: Lake Placid, New York

Tasks	1st place	2nd place	3rd place	4th place	5th place	6th place
Luge	Yellow	Purple	Green	Teal	Brown	Grey
Skating	Yellow	Green »	Purple «	Brown	Teal	Grey
Biathlon	Green	Yellow	Grey	Purple	Teal ♦	Brown
Using Clue Card and Decoding to Cross the Finish Line	Yellow (Big Reward)	Grey (Wrench)	Purple	Green	Teal	Brown (Eliminated)

- Prize: Skateboard
- Wrench Used on: Purple Team
- Shield: Found by Teal Team (Sam & Allison)

=== Episode 5: Lobster Fishers ===
Airdate: November 1, 2010

Location: Ingonish, Nova Scotia

Tasks	1st place	2nd place	3rd place	4th place	5th place
Gathering Fishing Supplies	Grey	Teal	Green	Purple	Yellow
Catching 30 Fish	Green	Purple	Teal	Grey	Yellow
Lobster Fishing	Purple	Green	Grey	Teal	Yellow
Finding Clue Card and Crossing the Finish Line	Green (Wrench)	Purple (Big Reward)	Grey	Teal ♦	Yellow (Eliminated) ♦

- Prize: Underwater goggles with cameras
- Wrench Used on: Teal Team
- Shield: Not Found/ Used by Teal Team (Sam & Allison) and Yellow Team (Bryanne & Tanner)

=== Episode 6: Navy Special Ops ===
Airdate: November 8, 2010

Location: Halifax, Nova Scotia

Tasks	1st place	2nd place	3rd place	4th place
Searching Contraband	Teal	Grey	Purple	Green ♦
Decoding and Coding with Flags	Grey	Teal	Green	Purple
Fixing Water Leakage in Flood Simulator	Teal	Grey	Green	Purple
Finding Clue Card and Crossing the Finish Line	Teal (Wrench)	Purple (Big Reward)	Grey (Eliminated)	Green ♦

- Prize: HD Flip Camera
- Wrench Used on: Teal Team
- Shield: Found by Green Team (Remington & Christian)/ Used by Green Team (Remington & Christian)

=== Episode 7: Sheep Ranchers ===
Airdate: November 15, 2010

Location: Lava Hot Springs, Idaho

Tasks	1st place	2nd place	3rd place
Penning Sheep	Teal	Green	Purple
Branding on Sheep	Green «	Purple	Teal »
Sheep Shearing	Green	Purple	Teal
Finding Clue Card and Crossing the Finish Line	Green (Big Reward)	Purple	Teal (Allison Eliminated)

- Sam and Allison, from the Teal Team, participated in a final showdown — roping a target – to determine who would be eliminated. Each challenger was given five different positions, each worth a different score, and five chances to rack up the most points. Sam was able to score a total of 8 points in four tries and was safe. Allison was unable to rope a single target in her five tries and was eliminated.
- Prize: Giant Mountain Bikes
- Wrench Used on: Green Team
- Shield: Not Found

=== Episode 8: Video Game Creators ===
Airdate: November 22, 2010

Location: Chicago, Illinois

Tasks	1st place	2nd place	3rd place	4th place	5th place
Creating a Monster	Tea^{24}	Amber^{23}	Sam^{22}	Christian^{17}	Remington^{14}
Mimicking Monster's Voice	Tea^{34(10)}	Sam^{32(10)}	Amber^{31(8)}	Christian^{23(6)}	Remington^{21(7)}
Motion Capture	Tea^{41(7)}	Sam^{40(8)}, Amber^{40(9)}		Christian^{29(6)}	Remington^{28(7)}
Movement Recording	Amber^{02:20}	Tea^{03:23}	Sam^{05:08}	Christian^{06:52}	Remington^{13:08}
Finding Clue Card and Crossing the Finish Line	Tea (Wrench)	Amber (Big Reward)	Sam	Christian	Remington (Eliminated)

- Starting in Episode 8 teams were dissolved and each challenger competed individually
- Superscript indicates points earned and relative time that each challenger begins to look for the clue card. Superscripts in brackets indicate points earned on that particular task.
- Prize: PSP Go
- Shield: Not Found

=== Episode 9: Dolphin Trainers ===
Airdate: November 29, 2010

Location: Key Largo, Florida

Tasks	1st place	2nd place	3rd place	4th place
Identifying Dolphins	Amber	Tea	Sam	Christian
Calculating Dolphins' Weight	Christian	Tea	Amber	Sam
Preparing Dolphins' Lunch	Sam	Christian	Tea	Amber
Training Dolphins	Christian	Tea	Sam	Amber
Finding Clue Card and Crossing the Finish Line	Sam (Big Reward)	Tea (Wrench)	Christian	Amber (Eliminated)

- Prize: Kodak Playsport Underwater Camera
- Wrench Used on: Christian
- Shield: Not Found

=== Episode 10: Astronauts ===
Airdate: December 6, 2010

Location:Fort Lauderdale, Titusville and Orlando, Florida

Tasks	1st place	2nd place	3rd place
Saying Alphabet Backwards while Spinning	Sam^{3}	Christian^{2}	Tea^{1}
Spacecraft Launching	Christian^{5(3)}	Tea^{3(2)} , Sam^{3(0)}	
Launching Canadarm	Christian^{8(3)}	Tea^{5(2)}	Sam^{4(1)}
Putting on Spacesuits	Christian^{9(1)}	Tea^{8(3)}	Sam^{6(2)}
Space Repair	Tea^{11(3)}», Christian^{11(2)}«		Sam^{8(2)}
Capturing Water Droplets	Tea^{13(2)}	Christian^{12(1)}	Sam^{11(3)}
Hamster Walk Round 1	Tea^{17(4)}	Sam^{15(4)}	Christian^{14(2)}
Hamster Walk Round 2	Tea^{19(2)} (Champion)	Sam^{18(3)} , Christian^{18(4)}	

Numbers of the superscript indicate total points earned to task; numbers in brackets indicate points earned on that particular task.

- Champion Prize: $10,000 Scholarship and Trip for 4 to the Caribbean
- Consolation Prize: Celestron Computerized Telescope
- Wrench Used on: Christian

== Final webisode ==
New to season 2 is the introduction of the final webisode in which two challengers came back to compete in a final showdown. The selection of the two challengers were based on popularity: fans play Race to the Finish on YTV website and put forth their points to their favourite challenger Tristen Lee and Bryanne Hordal were selected to compete. They experienced the training required to be a skydiver. After three rounds of challenges, Tristen won 10 points, and Bryanne won 8 points, making Tristen the Final Webisode winner.

== Season 2 records ==
Record	Challenger(s)	Number
Champion (Winner)	Tea	10 Experiences
Most Experience Wins	Tea & Sam	3 Experiences
Most Top Two Finishes	Tea	7 Experiences
Most Wrenches Won	Tea	3 Times
Most Times Wrenched	Christian	4 Times
Most Big Rewards Won	Sam & Amber	3 Times
Most Shields Found	Allison, Sam, Tanner, Bryanne, Christian & Remington	1 Time
