= Bayview Glen School =

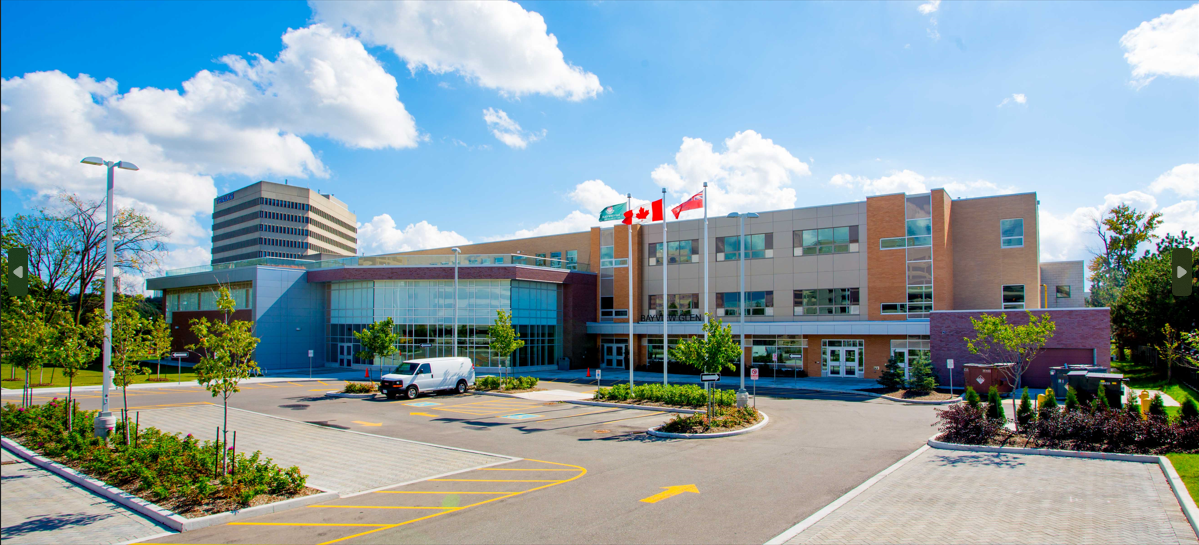

Location
- 85 Moatfield Drive; North York, Toronto, Ontario, M3B 3L6; Canada; 43°45′40.5″N 79°21′03.5″W

Information
- School type: Independent, Elementary School and High School
- Motto: Whole Child. Purposeful Life. Better World.
- Founded: 1962
- School number: 887188
- Principal: James Lee (Head of School)
- Grades: Preschool - Grade 12
- Enrollment: 1145 (2023-2024)
- Language: English
- Colours: Green, gold, grey, navy, white and burgundy
- Mascot: Gryphon
- Website: www.bayviewglen.ca

Bayview Glen School (also known as Bayview Glen or BVG) is an independent, co-educational, university preparatory day school with more than 1,100 students from preschool age 2 to Grade 12, located in the North York district of Toronto, Ontario, Canada.

Bayview Glen is a member of the CIS Ontario, CAIS, NAIS, CCAE, CASE, and Round Square organizations.

== History ==
Bayview Glen was founded in 1962 by L. Doreen (née Barwick) Hopkins as a nursery school and day camp. The school initially was housed in a barn in the Don River Valley near Crescent School. The site now hosts Crestwood school.

By 1964, Bayview Glen had expanded to include students from age two to Grade 1, and an adjoining property was acquired. By 1969, new buildings had been added and the school grew to include students through to Grade 6.

In 1980, Hopkins died, and the L. Doreen Hopkins Foundation took control in overseeing the school. A permanent facility replaced the barn. Space for an upper school was leased from an engineering firm. In 1985, four teachers, and a grade 7 and 8 class opened the renovated office space. Through the rest of the decade, one grade per year was added. In 1989, the valley property was sold and the lower school moved to the Duncan Mill Campus.

In 1991, The Doreen Hopkins Foundation was taken over by the Macmarmon Foundation and Terry Guest was appointed Headmaster. In 1991, Bayview Glen had its first graduating class. In 1998, Bayview Glen acquired the upper school campus located on Moatfield Drive.

In September 2000, the upper school was opened by The Duke of York. The site was complete with a double gymnasium and theatre complex. In 2001, Guest left Bayview Glen and took up the position of Executive Director of Round Square, of which the school is a member. He was succeeded by Stuart Grainger, who was Headmaster until 2003. He is currently the headmaster of Trinity College School in Port Hope.

Eileen Daunt was appointed Head of School in 2003.

Bayview Glen celebrated its 50th anniversary during the 2011–12 academic year. Diana and Simion Kronenfelds raised money for building school facilities, which was later named to honor the notable contributors.

In 2012–2014, Bayview Glen underwent renovations and a building was constructed that would bring the prep school and upper school together. In the spring of 2014, the new Moatfield Campus was reopened by Prince Andrew, on his second visit to the school. The campus offers facilities such as a double gym, an expanded dining hall, a theatre gallery, an alumni hall, new classrooms for specific areas of study, and lounge areas.

In 2022, Eileen Daunt announced her retirement as Head of School, and was succeeded by James Lee.

== In the media ==
Bayview Glen's facilities have appeared in the movie Kiss and Cry, based on the story of one of their alumni Carley Allison (class of 2013), starring Degrassi: The Next Generation co-stars Luke Bilyk and fellow alumna Sarah Fisher

== Notable alumni ==
- Garen Boyajian (2005), actor
- J. Miles Dale (1968), film producer
- Elliotte Friedman, sports journalist
- Yazmeen Jamieson (2016), soccer player for the Jamaica women's national football team
- Moez Kassam (1999), hedge fund manager
- Jordyn Listro (2013), soccer player for the Canada women's national soccer team
- Lisa Sonshine (2000), children's entertainer, member of the Juno-nominated musical duo Sonshine and Broccoli
- Rawlson King (1995), politician
- Zubin Surkari, Canadian national cricketer
- Len Väljas (2006), cross-country skier
- Bree Williamson (1998), actor

== See also ==
- Education in Ontario
- List of secondary schools in Ontario
