= Shenae Grimes-Beech =

Canadian actress (born 1989)

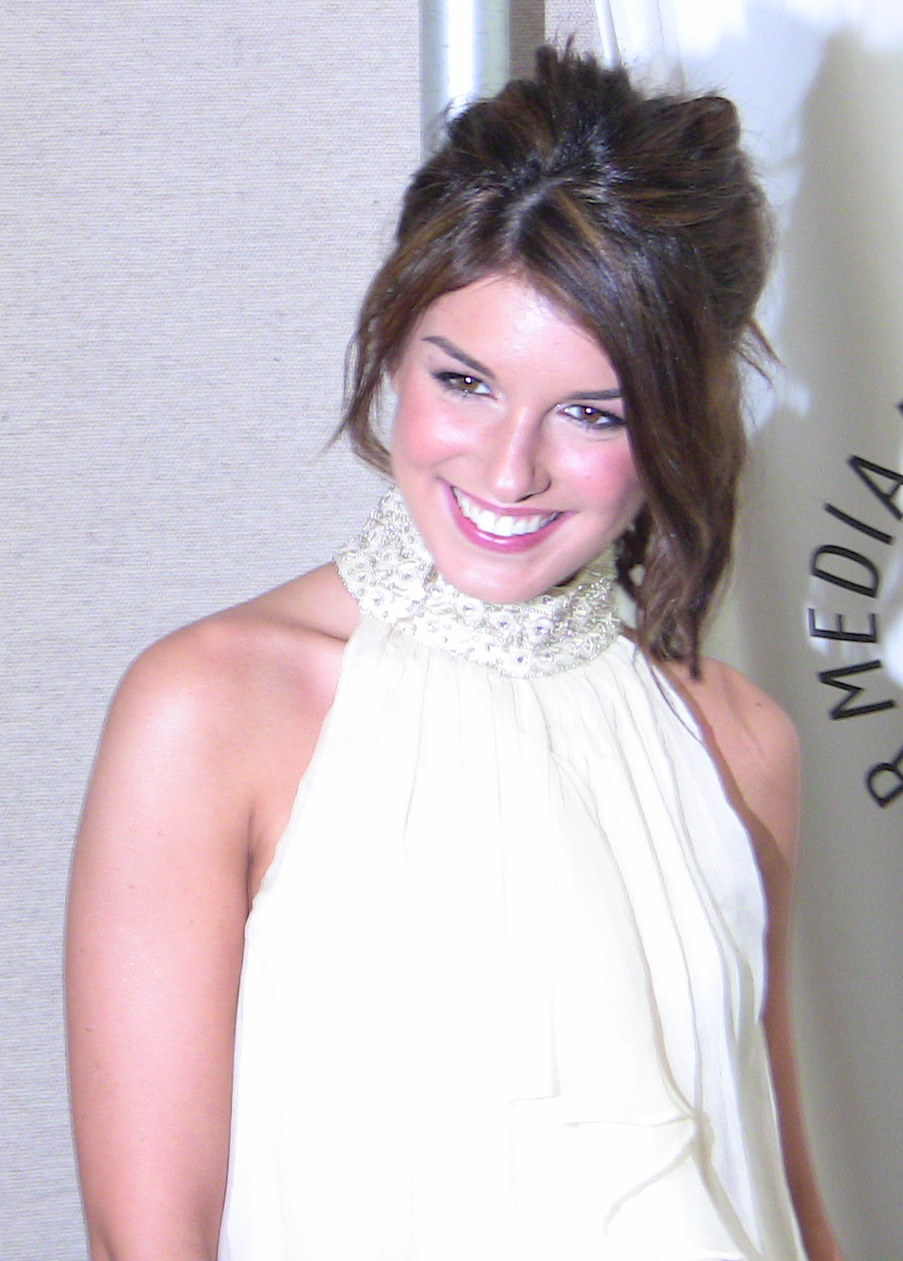
- Grimes at the 90210 Paley Fest at Beverly Hills, California in April 2009
- Born: Shenae Sonya Grimes; October 24, 1989 (age 37); Toronto, Ontario, Canada
- Other name: Shenae Grimes-Beech
- Citizenship: Canada; United States
- Occupation: Actress
- Years active: 2004–present
- Spouse: Josh Beech (m. 2013)
- Children: 2

Shenae Sonya Grimes-Beech (/ʃəˈneɪ/; born October 24, 1989), previously and still commonly credited as Shenae Grimes, is a Canadian actress best known as Annie Wilson on 90210. Prior to that, she had a recurring role on Naturally, Sadie, and was Darcy Edwards on Degrassi: The Next Generation for 4 seasons.

== Early life ==
Grimes was born in Toronto, Ontario, on October 24, 1989. She is of one-quarter Italian descent through a grandmother. Grimes interned at Toronto's FashionTelevision as part of her high school education.

== Career ==
=== Acting ===
Grimes began recurring as Darcy Edwards on Degrassi: The Next Generation in 2004, and became a series regular in 2006. In 2008, Grimes left the series and Canada after being cast as Annie Wilson in 90210, the CW's spin-off of Beverly Hills, 90210.

She also appeared in Picture This with Ashley Tisdale and with her former Degrassi: The Next Generation co-star Lauren Collins, and then in True Confessions of a Hollywood Starlet alongside singer JoJo.

In 2009, Grimes was named one of the world's most beautiful people, without makeup, by People magazine. She also appeared in a music video for rock band Our Lady Peace's single "All You Did Was Save My Life".

Grimes appears in the 2010 silent fashion short film Unzipped. She also participated in YouTuber Freddie Wong's video "Gun Size Matters". She made a cameo in the horror film Scream 4, released in April 2011.

In 2011, she traveled to Japan with her 90210 costars AnnaLynne McCord and Jessica Stroup to attend the Asia Girls Explosion (AGE) in Tokyo, after filming 90210's third-season finale. Grimes was caught up in Japan due to the events of the 2011 Tōhoku earthquake and tsunami. According to the actress, she was at Buddha's temple at the time when the earthquakes first occurred. Consequently, she started a campaign called "Spread the Heart" with the aim of supporting Japan by victim relief after the events of the tsunami and earthquakes. Many celebrities joined the campaign which later became a big movement.

In May 2011, during her 90210 hiatus, she took a six-week internship at Teen Vogue in New York City. She stated that working as an editor for a fashion magazine has always been her dream. In late 2011, she directed a music video for Megan and Liz's original song "Are You Happy Now?" to raise awareness about anti-bullying, in partnership with DoSomething.org. In 2013, Grimes starred in the film Sugar about a runaway girl living on the streets of Venice, Los Angeles.

In 2018, Grimes began playing homicide detective Jacqueline Cooper on CTV's police drama The Detail; the role marked her first time playing an adult character.

=== Other projects ===
Grimes has graced the covers of numerous fashion magazines, including US's Nylon, Vervegirl, Saturday Night Magazine Teen Prom and Dirrty Glam. She also modeled for Teen Vogue and Complex. She has appeared in television commercials for Coffee Crisp.

In 2014, she became the brand ambassador for the Montreal-based Annabelle Cosmetics. As the face of the cosmetics line, she appeared in print and television advertisements to promote the products. Grimes and husband Josh Beech started their own clothing line in 2014 called "Two Halves" that featured jewelry and clothes that were sold online and at the Toronto-based boutique Jonathon + Olivia.

== Personal life ==
Grimes began dating British model and musician Josh Beech in May 2012. In December 2012, after nine months of dating, Grimes announced that she and Beech were engaged. They were married on May 10, 2013, in Ashford, Kent, England. In May 2018, the couple announced that they were expecting their first child; their daughter was born in September 2018. Their second child, a son, was born in August 2021.

On December 20, 2019, Grimes announced on her Instagram page that she had become an American citizen, and now holds dual Canadian-American citizenship.

In 2011, Grimes identified as an atheist. However, in a 2024 interview, she stated that her views had changed, and that she believed in a higher power, but was not a follower of any particular religion.

== Filmography ==
Film roles
Year	Title	Role	Notes
2008	The Cross Road	Bridget	
2009	Dead Like Me: Life After Death	Jennifer Hardick	Direct-to-video film
2011	Scream 4	Trudie	
2013	Empire State	Eleni	
2013	Sugar	Sugar	
2017	Blood Honey	Jenibel Heath	
2018	The Rake	Ashley	

Television roles
Year	Title	Role	Notes
2004–2008	Degrassi: The Next Generation	Darcy Edwards	Recurring role (seasons 4–5); main role (seasons 6–7); special guest star (season 8); 40 episodes
2005	Shania: A Life in Eight Albums	Teenage Shania Twain	Television film
2005	Kevin Hill	Katie Lassman	Episode: "Sacrificial Lambs"
2005–2007	Naturally, Sadie	Arden Alcott	Recurring role; 15 episodes
2006	72 Hours: True Crime	Teenage girl	Episode: "Lust"
2008–2013	90210	Annie Wilson	Main role
2008	Picture This	Cayenne	Television film
2008	True Confessions of a Hollywood Starlet	Marissa Dahl	Television film
2009	Overruled!	Abby	Uncredited; episode: "Style Conscience"
2010	The Hills	Herself	Episode: "Between a Rocker and a Hard Place"
2012	Punk'd	Herself	Episode: "Tyler the Creator"
2012	America's Next Top Model	Herself	Episode: "The Girl Who Cries Home"
2012	Britain & Ireland's Next Top Model	Herself	Cycle 8, episode 12
2014	The Hazing Secret	Megan Harris	Television film
2015	Christmas Incorporated	Riley	Hallmark Movie
2016	Sandra Brown's White Hot	Sayre Hoyle	Television film
2016	Date with Love	Alex Allen	Television film
2016	Newlywed and Dead	Christine	Television film
2017	The Mechanics of Love	Matti Dupree	Television film
2017	iZombie	Piper	Episode: "Dirt Nap Time"
2018	The Detail	Jacqueline "Jack" Cooper	Main role
2022	When I Think of Christmas	Sara	Television film
2023	Time for Her to Come Home for Christmas	Carly	Television film
2025	Love of the Irish	Fiona	Television film

Music video roles
Year	Title	Artist	Notes
2009	"All You Did Was Save My Life"	Our Lady Peace	Shot in Hamilton, Ontario, Canada
2010	"Myself and I"	Shenae Grimes	Grimes' directorial, singing and songwriting debut
2011	"Are You Happy Now?"	Megan & Liz	As director

== Awards and nominations ==
Year	Award	Category	Work	Result	Refs
2006	Young Artist Award	Best Young Ensemble Performance in a TV Series (Comedy or Drama) (Shared with: Dalmar Abuzeid, John Bregar, Deanna Casaluce, Daniel Clark, Lauren Collins, Ryan Cooley, Marc Donato, Jake Epstein, Stacey Farber, Aubrey Graham, Jake Goldsbie, Jamie Johnston, Shane Kippel, Andrea Lewis, Mike Lobel, Miriam McDonald, Melissa McIntyre, Daniel Morrison, Adamo Ruggiero, Cassie Steele and Sarah Barrable-Tishauer)	Degrassi: The Next Generation	Nominated	
2007	Gemini Award	Best Performance in a Children's or Youth Program or Series (Episode "Eyes Without a Face" pt. 2)	Degrassi: The Next Generation	Won	
2008	Monaco International Film Festival	Best Ensemble Cast (Shared with: Tommy Lioutas, Garen Boyajian, Bruce Gooch and Sean O'Neill)	The Cross Road	Won	
2010	Teen Choice Award	Choice TV: Female Scene Stealer	90210	Nominated	
