= Sabrina Jalees =

Canadian comedian

- Born: Toronto, Ontario, Canada
- Education: Toronto Metropolitan University
- Occupations: Actress, comedian
- Years active: 2001–present
- Spouse: Shauna McCann
- Children: 2

Sabrina Jalees is a Canadian comedian, actress, and writer. She has written for various series, and starred as a main cast member alongside Patricia Heaton in the 2019 TV comedy series Carol's Second Act.

== Early life and education ==
The daughter of a Swiss mother and a Pakistani father, she graduated from Earl Haig Secondary School, and later from the Radio and Television Arts program at Toronto Metropolitan University in June 2007.

== Career ==
Jalees wrote a weekly column in the Toronto Star's ID section.

She has made many Canadian media appearances, including as a commentator on MuchMusic's Video on Trial, Stars on Trial and LOL!, as well as a role in the drama series Flashpoint, and Jian Ghomeshi's Monday correspondent on CBC Radio One's Sounds Like Canada in the Summer. She also previously filed a regular segment on Go. She is a former host (until 2010) of Laugh Out Loud on CBC Radio One and a reality TV show for children, In Real Life, airing on YTV. She made a cameo in the video for the song Break This by Hunter Valentine. She narrates the CBBC series Rank the Prank.

She was a writer for Canada's Got Talent and Fraggle Rock: Back to the Rock.

In 2020, she appeared in an episode of Canada's Drag Race, as co-judge of a mini-challenge in the episode "The Snow Ball".

In 2021, she was announced as one of the judges in the first season of Roast Battle Canada. In 2023 she debuted as host of Farming for Love.

== Personal life ==
Jalees came out as a lesbian and was shunned by her extended Muslim family, an experience she relates in her 2013 Canadian comedy tour, "Brownlisted." Her wife, Shauna McCann, is a fashion designer. They have two sons.

== Filmography ==
=== Film ===
Year	Title	Role	Notes
2008	The Cross Road	Muslim Gi	
2015	Portrait of a Serial Monogamist	Sarah	
2023	I Used to Be Funny	Paige	
2024	Doin' It	Jess	
2025	Mile End Kicks	Phoebe Reilly	

=== Television ===
Year	Title	Role	Notes
2005	Mom at Sixteen	Sarah	Television film
2008	Flashpoint	Cassaundra	Episode: "Attention Shoppers"
2009–2011	In Real Life	Herself	Canadian Reality Show
2016	Transparent	Aubree	Episode: "When the Battle Is Over"
2017, 2019	Baroness von Sketch Show	Rita / The Trainer	2 episodes; also writer
2018	Take My Wife	Interviewer	Episode #2.5
2019	Noches con Platanito	Guest	1 episode
2019–2020	Carol's Second Act	Dr. Lexie Gilani	Main role; 18 episodes
2020	Search Party	Amy	Episode: "A Dangerous Union"; also writer
2022	Human Resources	Nadia (voice)	Episode: "Rutgers is for Lovers"
2022	Would I Lie to You?	Self	12 episodes
2022–2024	Fraggle Rock: Back to the Rock	—N/a	Writer; 3 episodes
2023	Farming for Love	Self	Series host
2023–2025	Rubble & Crew	Auntie Crane (voice)	Main role
2025	Black Mirror	Angie	Episode: "Common People"
2026	Mating Season	Penelope the Fox (voice)	Main role
2027	Heated Rivalry †	Farah Jalali	Season 2
