= The Vestibules =

Canadian comedy troupe

The Vestibules, formerly known as Radio Free Vestibule, is a Canadian comedy troupe composed of Terence Bowman, Paul Paré, and Bernard Deniger.

== Career ==
Based in Montreal, the trio began performing in 1987. Students at Montreal's Concordia University, they performed in Montreal-area comedy clubs and produced a radio comedy program for CKUT-FM. They had songs played on the syndicated Dr. Demento radio show, and soon began appearing on CBC Radio's Prime Time, beginning with occasional parody songs and later expanding to a twice-weekly sketch comedy segment; in April 1990, the program gave them a full half-hour special.

The trio was known primarily for absurdist comedy based on pop culture, and resisted humor that was too explicitly political. One sketch which aired on Prime Time in 1990 satirized Canadian radio comedy's predilection for political humor, featuring an audience laughing uproariously at a reference to Meech Lake in the punchline to a deliberately unfunny "anti-joke". One of their most famous pieces was "Jellybellies Forever", a mockumentary about the rise and fall of a children's music group who had been inspired by the legendary supergroup Sharon, Lois, Bram and Young. Their satirical songs included "I Don't Want to Go to Toronto", a parody of Toronto's uptight and elitist image, and "Grunge Song", a parody of early 1990s songwriting which was frequently shown on MuchMusic. Another sketch with rare political overtones was "Looking for a Job in Quebec", in which a nervous anglophone insisted that his surname, O'Leary, was pronounced "Thibodeau".

In 1992, the troupe were given their own weekly series on CBC Radio, as a summer replacement for Royal Canadian Air Farce. In the fall, they returned to Prime Time for the show's final season. After Prime Time's cancellation, their sketches continued to appear on the CBC Radio programs Basic Black and Night Lines, and on follow-up seasons of their summer series.

In 1993, the trio appeared in a segment on A&E's Comedy on the Road, as part of a series of specials taped at the Just for Laughs Festival, and garnered a Gemini Award nomination for Best Comedy Performance for their appearance in CBC Television's Just for Laughs special. In 1994, they collaborated with former Prime Time host Geoff Pevere on X-Ray Vision, a television comedy pilot which aired as a special on CTV but was not picked up as a permanent series.

In 1995, they appeared on CBC Television's Comics!, released their first comedy album Sketches, Songs and Shoes, and became regular contributors to Definitely Not the Opera.

== Name change ==
The trio shortened its name from Radio Free Vestibule to The Vestibules in 1997. In 1998, the troupe were the main writers of the sitcom Radio Active for YTV, and they sold a screenplay for Disco Inferno, a genre-hopping disaster/action/musical comedy film about a discotheque inside a dormant volcano, to MTV Films.

Their second comedy album, Get Spiffy!, was released in 2002. They have since released three further comedy albums and a DVD.

== Personal life ==
Paré is the uncle of actress Jessica Paré.

== Discography ==
- Sketches Songs and Shoes (1995, as Radio Free Vestibule)
- Get Spiffy! (2002)
- Chest of Drawers 5.0 (2005)
- The Complete First Episode (2005, DVD)
- The Jellybellies Forever (2006)
- The Best of the Radio McGill Years volumes 1-4 (2006)
