= Radio Active (TV series) =

- Genre: Sitcom
- Based on: Radio Enfer by François Jobin and Louis Saia
- Written by: Terence Bowman; Paul Paré; Bernard Deniger; Heidi Foss; Shane Simmons; Jennifer Seguin
- Starring: Giancarlo Caltabiano; Lucinda Davis; Melissa Galianos; Vik Sahay; Michael Yarmush; Vanessa Lengies; Susan Glover; Andrew Walker
- Composer: Daniel Vermette
- Country of origin: Canada
- Original language: English
- No. of seasons: 3
- No. of episodes: 78

Production
- Running time: 30 minutes
- Production company: Ciné Télé Action Inc.

Original release
- Network: YTV
- Release: 12 September 1998 – 12 March 2001

Radio Active is a Canadian sitcom television series broadcast on YTV, based on the Quebec French series Radio Enfer, about group of students at Upper Redwood High managing their own school radio station, called Radio Active.

Radio Active ran for a total of 78 episodes and three seasons dating from 12 September 1998, to 12 March 2001.

== Premise ==
Radio Active follows a group of students at Upper Redwood High who have a radio show. Chaos follows as the group try to work together and watching out for the sneaky Ms. Noelle Atoll who always believes they're up to something.

== Cast and characters ==
=== Main cast ===
- Giancarlo Caltabiano as George S. Goodwin III: Known to like Normal Man comics and speaks fondly of his uncle. Though not exactly the most intelligent member of the group, his eccentricity adds variety to the school's radio broadcasts. He has a distinct hairstyle, consisting of many bleached-blond spikes which have been shown to be sharp and hard enough to pierce apples.
- Lucinda Davis as Tanya Panda: Tanya is quiet and enjoys reading horoscopes. She often tries to make peace among the group. She and Morgan are best friends.
- Melissa Galianos as Morgan Leigh: Morgan is the productive, witty and reliable one in the group. She strives to get perfect grades and frequently clashes with Kevin, Roger, and Blair.
- Vik Sahay as Kevin Calvin (Season 1): The captain of the hockey team and all around average jock. He has a big ego and speaks often of the babes of Upper Redwood High. Kevin is frequently the target of Ms Atoll's ire.
- Michael Yarmush as Ethan St. John (Season 1): Ethan fears Miss Atoll and frequently sucks up to her. He admires Kevin's ability to attract girls and appears to have a slight crush on Morgan.
- Ryan Wilner as Roger Richards (seasons 2–3): Roger is one of, if not the most, intelligent of the group. He always gets good marks and is known to suck up to Ms. Atoll. However, he is notably uncool and can be somewhat self-centred.
- Andrew Walker as Blair Resnicky (seasons 2–3): An athletic, arrogant, dim-witted new student who joins Radio Active. He is quite popular with the girls at Upper Redwood and his macho attitude frequently clashes with Morgan.
- Robert Higden as Angus B. Noseworthy: The Vice Principal in charge of discipline, however is laid back and has no self-discipline. He often begins a speech with "I remember when I was your age,...". He and Ms. Atoll attended Upper Redwood as students when they were still in high school.
- Susan Glover as Noelle Atoll: The supervising teacher in charge of Radio Active, whom the group dislikes. Ms. Atoll is an English teacher and tends to hand out multiple detentions for those who work at Radio Active.
- Vanessa Lengies as Sarah Leigh: Morgan's little sister, who constantly annoys and interrupts the group. Mostly noted for her mail delivery on roller blades.

== Episodes ==
=== Season 1: 1998–99 ===
No. overall	No. in season	Title	Directed by	Written by	Original release date
1	1	"Fraudcast"	Ross Francoeur	Terence Bowman, Bernard Deniger and Paul Paré	12 September 1998
2	2	"Quiz Show"	Ross Francoeur	Terence Bowman, Bernard Deniger, Paul Paré and Jennifer Seguin	19 September 1998
3	3	"The Gossip"	Ross Francoeur	Terence Bowman, Bernard Deniger, Paul Paré and Jennifer Seguin	26 September 1998
4	4	"The Evil Empire"	Ross Francoeur	Terence Bowman, Bernard Deniger, Paul Paré and Jennifer Seguin	3 October 1998
5	5	"The CD Case"	Ross Francoeur	Terence Bowman, Bernard Deniger, Paul Paré and Jennifer Seguin	10 October 1998
6	6	"Payola Payback"	Ross Francoeur	Terence Bowman, Bernard Deniger, Paul Paré and Jennifer Seguin	17 October 1998
7	7	"The Big Shot"	Ross Francoeur	Terence Bowman, Bernard Deniger, Paul Paré and Jennifer Seguin	24 October 1998
8	8	"The Great Hypnoto"	François Jobin	Terence Bowman, Bernard Deniger, Paul Paré and Jennifer Seguin	31 October 1998
9	9	"Love Bets"	Ross Francoeur	Terence Bowman, Bernard Deniger, Paul Paré and Jennifer Seguin	7 November 1998
10	10	"The Prima Donna"	François Jobin	Terence Bowman, Bernard Deniger, Paul Paré and Jennifer Seguin	14 November 1998
11	11	"Tanya's Psychic Connection"	Ross Francoeur	Terence Bowman, Bernard Deniger, Paul Paré and Jennifer Seguin	21 November 1998
12	12	"The Replacement"	François Jobin	Terence Bowman, Bernard Deniger, Paul Paré and Jennifer Seguin	28 November 1998
13	13	"The Ticket"	François Jobin	Terence Bowman, Bernard Deniger, Paul Paré and Jennifer Seguin	5 December 1998
14	14	"Boxing Tanya"	François Jobin	Story by : Terence Bowman, Bernard Deniger, Paul Paré and Jennifer Seguin; Teleplay by : Terence Bowman, Bernard Deniger and Paul Paré	12 December 1998
15	15	"Ethan Live"	François Jobin	Story by : Terence Bowman, Bernard Deniger, Paul Paré and Jennifer Seguin; Teleplay by : Terence Bowman, Bernard Deniger and Paul Paré	19 December 1998
16	16	"The Play"	François Jobin	Story by : Terence Bowman, Bernard Deniger, Paul Paré and Jennifer Seguin; Teleplay by : Terence Bowman, Bernard Deniger and Paul Paré	9 January 1999
17	17	"Mr. Moneybags"	François Jobin	Story by : Terence Bowman, Bernard Deniger, Paul Paré and Jennifer Seguin; Teleplay by : Terence Bowman, Bernard Deniger and Paul Paré	16 January 1999
18	18	"The Radio Activists"	François Jobin	Story by : Terence Bowman, Bernard Deniger, Paul Paré and Jennifer Seguin; Teleplay by : Terence Bowman, Bernard Deniger and Paul Paré	23 January 1999
19	19	"The Classy Girl"	François Jobin	Story by : Terence Bowman, Bernard Deniger, Paul Paré and Jennifer Seguin; Teleplay by : Terence Bowman, Bernard Deniger and Paul Paré	30 January 1999
20	20	"Morgan's Day Off"	François Jobin	Story by : Terence Bowman, Bernard Deniger, Paul Paré and Jennifer Seguin; Teleplay by : Terence Bowman, Bernard Deniger and Paul Paré	6 February 1999
21	21	"Stalag 16 1/2"	François Jobin	Story by : Terence Bowman, Bernard Deniger, Paul Paré and Jennifer Seguin; Teleplay by : Terence Bowman, Bernard Deniger and Paul Paré	13 February 1999
22	22	"The Poet"	François Jobin	Story by : Terence Bowman, Bernard Deniger, Paul Paré and Jennifer Seguin; Teleplay by : Terence Bowman, Bernard Deniger and Paul Paré	20 February 1999
23	23	"The Secret Admirer"	François Jobin	Story by : Terence Bowman, Bernard Deniger, Paul Paré and Jennifer Seguin; Teleplay by : Terence Bowman, Bernard Deniger and Paul Paré	27 February 1999
24	24	"Blackmail"	François Jobin	Story by : Terence Bowman, Bernard Deniger, Paul Paré and Jennifer Seguin; Teleplay by : Terence Bowman, Bernard Deniger and Paul Paré	6 March 1999
25	25	"The Substitute"	François Jobin	Story by : Terence Bowman, Bernard Deniger, Paul Paré and Jennifer Seguin; Teleplay by : Terence Bowman, Bernard Deniger and Paul Paré	13 March 1999
26	26	"Ethan Without a Cause"	François Jobim	Story by : Terence Bowman, Bernard Deniger, Paul Paré and Jennifer Seguin; Teleplay by : Terence Bowman, Bernard Deniger and Paul Paré	20 March 1999

=== Season 2: 1999–2000 ===
No. overall	No. in season	Title	Directed by	Written by	Original release date
27	1	"The Leader"	François Jobin	Terence Bowman, Bernard Deniger and Paul Paré	11 September 1999
28	2	"The Invasion"	François Jobin	Heidi Foss	18 September 1999
29	3	"Sock It to Me"	François Jobin	Shane Simmons	25 September 1999
30	4	"Dr. Tanya"	François Jobin	Terence Bowman, Bernard Deniger and Paul Paré	2 October 1999
31	5	"The Interception"	François Jobin	Heidi Foss	9 October 1999
32	6	"The Blaire Resnickie Project"	François Jobin	Shane Simmons	16 October 1999
33	7	"Dark Sarah"	François Jobin	Terence Bowman, Bernard Deniger and Paul Paré	23 October 1999
34	8	"Logic 101"	François Jobin	Terence Bowman, Bernard Deniger and Paul Paré	30 October 1999
35	9	"The Truth and Nothing but the Truth"	François Jobin	Isabelle Langlois	6 November 1999
36	10	"The Big Lie"	François Jobin	Terence Bowman, Bernard Deniger and Paul Paré	13 November 1999
37	11	"The Marathon Broadcast"	François Jobin	Terence Bowman, Bernard Deniger and Paul Paré	20 November 1999
38	12	"The Review"	François Jobin	Heidi Foss	27 November 1999
39	13	"Television Active"	François Jobin	Terence Bowman, Bernard Deniger and Paul Paré	4 December 1999
40	14	"Morgan Unplugged"	François Jobin	Shane Simmons	11 December 1999
41	15	"The Prince and the Pimple"	François Jobin	Shane Simmons	18 December 1999
42	16	"The Junk Food Racket"	François Jobin	Terence Bowman, Bernard Deniger and Paul Paré	8 January 2000
43	17	"Good! Win Hunting"	François Jobin	Heidi Foss	15 January 2000
44	18	"Matchmaker, Matchmaker"	François Jobin	Terence Bowman, Bernard Deniger and Paul Paré	22 January 2000
45	19	"Smart and Smarter"	François Jobin	Terence Bowman, Bernard Deniger and Paul Paré	29 January 2000
46	20	"Disk-Junky"	François Jobin	Heidi Foss	5 February 2000
47	21	"Fashion Police"	François Jobin	Shane Simmons	12 February 2000
48	22	"Morgan and Blaine Sitting in a Tree!"	François Jobin	Terence Bowman, Bernard Deniger and Paul Paré	19 February 2000
49	23	"Miz Atoll Dearest"	François Jobin	Heidi Foss	26 February 2000
50	24	"Daydreams"	François Jobin	Terence Bowman, Bernard Deniger and Paul Paré	4 March 2000
51	25	"Return to Sender"	François Jobin	Shane Simmons	11 March 2000
52	26	"The Fund Raiser"	François Jobin	Terence Bowman, Bernard Deniger and Paul Paré	18 March 2000

=== Season 3: 2000–01 ===
No. overall	No. in season	Title	Directed by	Written by	Original release date
53	1	"The Wrong Man, the Right Rodent"	François Jobin	Shane Simmons	9 September 2000
54	2	"It's a Mad, Mad, Mad Station"	François Jobin	Heidi Foss	16 September 2000
55	3	"Cyrano de Internet"	François Jobin	Terence Bowman, Bernard Deniger and Paul Paré	23 September 2000
56	4	"They Call Me Uncle Tibby"	François Jobin	Terence Bowman, Bernard Deniger and Paul Paré	30 September 2000
57	5	"Lou Ann, the Fan"	François Jobin	Terence Bowman, Bernard Deniger and Paul Paré	7 October 2000
58	6	"Verse Versus Reverse"	François Jobin	Shane Simmons	14 October 2000
59	7	"Death of a Nozzle Salesman"	François Jobin	Terence Bowman, Bernard Deniger and Paul Paré	21 October 2000
60	8	"Cyber Boy"	François Jobin	Unknown	28 October 2000
61	9	"The Model"	François Jobin	Terence Bowman, Bernard Deniger and Paul Paré	4 November 2000
62	10	"Bully for You"	François Jobin	Shane Simmons	11 November 2000
63	11	"Rogercus"	François Jobin	Terence Bowman, Bernard Deniger and Paul Paré	18 November 2000
64	12	"Dead Comic's Society"	François Jobin	Heidi Foss	25 November 2000
65	13	"A Christmas Atoll"	François Jobin	Terence Bowman, Bernard Deniger and Paul Paré	2 December 2000
66	14	"Identity Crisis"	François Jobin	Heidi Foss	9 December 2000
67	15	"Bad Aptitude"	François Jobin	Shane Simmons	16 December 2000
68	16	"Lou Ann's Return"	François Jobin	Terence Bowman, Bernard Deniger and Paul Paré	6 January 2001
69	17	"Paramedic Paramour"	François Jobin	Heidi Foss	13 January 2001
70	18	"The Ratings War"	François Jobin	Terence Bowman, Bernard Deniger and Paul Paré	20 January 2001
71	19	"The Wendy Gwendolyn Conundrum"	François Jobin	Terence Bowman, Bernard Deniger and Paul Paré	27 January 2001
72	20	"Meat Versus Potatoes"	François Jobin	Shane Simmons	3 February 2001
73	21	"Eye to Eye, Pupil to Pupil"	François Jobin	Shane Simmons	10 February 2001
74	22	"Commercial Chaos"	François Jobin	Heidi Foss	17 February 2001
75	23	"No Trouble Atoll"	François Jobin	Terence Bowman, Bernard Deniger and Paul Paré	24 February 2001
76	24	"Culture Shock"	François Jobin	Shane Simmons	3 March 2001
77	25	"Role Reversal"	François Jobin	Terence Bowman, Bernard Deniger and Paul Paré	10 March 2001
78	26	"For Whom the Bell Curve Tolls"	François Jobin	Shane Simmons	12 March 2001

== See also ==
- Radio Free Roscoe, another Canadian teen series with a similar premise
