= Alan Edward Bell =

American film editor

Alan Edward Bell is an American film editor. He has edited such films as Little Manhattan, 500 Days of Summer, The Amazing Spider-Man, The Hunger Games: Catching Fire, The Hunger Games: Mockingjay – Part 1, The Hunger Games: Mockingjay – Part 2, and Red Sparrow.

== Career ==
Bell's mentor when he started working in Hollywood was editor Robert Leighton. Bell served as associate editor on multiple Rob Reiner films, all under Leighton, such as Misery, A Few Good Men, North, and The American President. Bell then graduated to main editor with films such as Reiner's The Story of Us and Alex & Emma, and then started a steady stream of work in the mid-2000s, with films including Little Manhattan, Hoot, The Comebacks, 500 Days of Summer, Gulliver's Travels, and Water for Elephants. Bell then reunited with 500 Days of Summer director Marc Webb for The Amazing Spider-Man. Bell next edited The Hunger Games: Catching Fire for Water for Elephants director Francis Lawrence, and then edited the remainder of the films in The Hunger Games film series, as well as Lawrence's Red Sparrow. In 2022, he worked on the film adaptation of Delia Owens' novel Where the Crawdads Sing, directed by Olivia Newman.

Bell is a member of American Cinema Editors (ACE) and the Academy of Motion Picture Arts and Sciences (AMPAS).

== Filmography ==
Year	Film	Director	Notes
1999	The Story of Us	Rob Reiner	
2000	Bait	Antoine Fuqua	
2002	The Anarchist Cookbook	Jordan Susman	
2003	Alex & Emma	Rob Reiner	
2005	Little Manhattan	Mark Levin Jennifer Flackett	
2006	Hoot	Will Shriner	
2007	The Comebacks	Tom Brady	
2008	Nim's Island	Mark Levin Jennifer Flackett	Co-producer only
2009	500 Days of Summer	Marc Webb	
2010	Gulliver's Travels	Rob Letterman	
2011	Water for Elephants	Francis Lawrence	
2012	The Amazing Spider-Man	Marc Webb	
2013	The Hunger Games: Catching Fire	Francis Lawrence	
2014	The Hunger Games: Mockingjay – Part 1	Francis Lawrence	
2015	The Hunger Games: Mockingjay – Part 2	Francis Lawrence	
2017	The Dark Tower	Nikolaj Arcel	
2018	Red Sparrow	Francis Lawrence	
2021	Fear Street	Leigh Janiak	Supervising editor
2022	Where the Crawdads Sing	Olivia Newman	
