= Mating Season =

- Genre: Adult animation; Romantic comedy; Sex comedy
- Created by: Andrew Goldberg; Nick Kroll; Mark Levin; Jennifer Flackett
- Starring: Zach Woods; Nick Kroll; June Diane Raphael; Sabrina Jalees; Sarah Silverman; Abbi Jacobson; Jack McBrayer; Timothy Olyphant; Ana Gasteyer; Clancy Brown
- Opening theme: "Fooled Around And Fell In Love" by Elvin Bishop
- Ending theme: "Mating Season" by AJR
- Composer: Mark Rivers
- Country of origin: United States
- Original language: English
- No. of seasons: 1
- No. of episodes: 10

Production
- Executive producers: Andrew Goldberg; Nick Kroll; Mark Levin; Jennifer Flackett; Chris Prynoski; Shannon Prynoski; Antonio Canobbio; Ben Kalina
- Running time: 22 mins
- Production companies: Netflix Animation Studios; Brutus Pink; Titmouse, Inc.

Original release
- Network: Netflix
- Release: May 22, 2026

Mating Season is an adult animated romantic comedy television series created by Big Mouth and Human Resources co-creators Andrew Goldberg, Nick Kroll, Mark Levin, and Jennifer Flackett for Netflix, and produced by Titmouse, Inc. The series stars Kroll, Sabrina Jalees, Zach Woods and June Diane Raphael as the lead characters, and follows four forest animals: Ray, Josh, Penelope and Fawn. It was released on May 22, 2026 to positive reviews from critics.

== Plot ==
The series is set in a world of anthropomorphic animals in this raunchy romantic comedy, where a group of forest animals go on wild adventures and discover love in their lives of sex and mating. The group is led by Josh, a bear, Ray, a raccoon, Penelope, a fox, and Fawn, a deer.

== Cast and characters ==
=== Main ===
- Zach Woods as Josh, a timid grizzly bear who wears a green scarf.
- Nick Kroll as Ray, a raccoon wearing red sneakers, and Josh's best friend.
- June Diane Raphael as Fawn, a doe.
- Sabrina Jalees as Penelope, a lesbian red fox, and Fawn's best friend.

=== Recurring ===
- Abbi Jacobson as Summer, a lesbian beagle who was in a forbidden romance with Penelope in Canada.
- Timothy Olyphant as Dylan McDermott (no relation), a wolf who Fawn was in love with around the same time as Penelope and Summer's romance.
- Jack McBrayer as Geoffrey, a burrowing owl who annoys the main characters.
- Annaleigh Ashford as Addy, a swan whom Ray falls in love with.
- Ana Gasteyer and Clancy Brown as Ellen and Robert, Josh's sexually active parents.
- Drew Tarver as Zeke, a moose who dates Fawn before discovering he's gay while fighting for Fawn's love.

=== Guest ===
- Sarah Silverman as Samantha, a striped skunk who gets stuck to Ray (in a copulary tie) after an intimate session.
- Jason Alexander as Alan, Fawn's father.
- David Duchovny as Charles, a deer that Alan hooks up with Fawn briefly.
- Jason Mantzoukas, as AJ, a honey badger.
- Beck Bennett as Arnold, a workout-obsessed goat who dates Fawn, even though the two are not compatible.
- Mark Duplass as Connor, a bobcat who shares a meet-cute with Fawn, despite already being married.
- Carlos Alazraqui as Esteban, a Hispanic-accented groundhog sculptor who, along with his partner, convinces Penelope to "be their unicorn".
- Pamela Adlon as Gina, Ray's deadbeat mom.
- Toks Olagundoye as Claudia (her real name being Colony Sugar), a show horse who falls in love with Josh after running away from her past life.
- Lena Waithe as Alex, a part of the lesbian forager group who Penelope crushes on.
- Aidy Bryant as Nancy, a female grizzly bear who's the guitarist for the lesbian forager group.
- Anna Konkle as Sarah, aka Weird Sarah, Josh´s childhood friend that ends up going on a date with him.
- Vanessa Bayer as Meredith, the first time mom and friend of Fawn.
- Lisa Gilroy
- Natasha Leggero
- Mitra Jouhari as McKayleigh, a horny rabbit that Ray has large amounts of intercourse with, resulting in him overdosing on horny goat weed.
- Matt Rogers as Cody, a lesbophobic ferret who ostracizes Fawn and Penelope for being at a gay bar in support of a gay friend.
- Lauren Lapkus
- Meredith Hagner as Macey, a female groundhog who leaves her underwear at Ray's as an attempt at a second hookup.
- Natalie Morales
- Nasim Pedrad
- Andrew Rannells

== Episodes ==
No.	Title	Directed by	Written by	Original release date
1	"The Copulatory Tie"	Henrique Jardim	Nick Kroll, Andrew Goldberg, Jennifer Flackett & Mark Levin	May 22, 2026
Josh wakes up two weeks after hibernation to find that his girlfriend had left him. Meanwhile, Ray has sex with a skunk but their genitals get stuck together and Fawn attends her mother's funeral and is disgusted to find her father had moved on with a younger woman that he took to the funeral.
2	"The Dating Sites"	Alex Salyer	Jackie Clarke	May 22, 2026
Penelope tries to get in good with a club of lesbian animals, but Fawn unintentionally steals her thunder. Josh attempts to find a new animal to mate with at a tree called Tinklr (based on Tinder). Ray has to retrieve the panties of an attractive gopher who left them at his house, but he sold them to a creepy buffalo.
3	"The Lull"	Ross Bradley	Victor Quinaz	May 22, 2026
To improve his stamina when having sex with a hyperactive rabbit, Ray takes some of Josh's dad's medication that gives him a sexual drive. Penelope visits a psychic mouse, but things take an interesting turn when said mouse brings up an incident Penelope had in Canada. Fawn dates Zeke, a moose, but he's very insecure about his masculinity, so Fawn has him battle another moose to improve his confidence.
4	"The Truth About Canada"	Henrique Jardim	Ashly Burch	May 22, 2026
Penelope and Fawn each tell a tragic story which ties into how they first met; with Penelope entering into a forbidden romance with a foxhound named Summer and Fawn having a relationship with a wild wolf named Dylan.
5	"The Hot Mess"	Alex Salyer	Anna Drezen	May 22, 2026
Ray's deadbeat mother Gina visits him for his birthday and Josh is desperate to protect his friend from Gina's toxic behavior, but Ray really wants to be around his mother. Fawn visits an old friend of her who became a mother and soon becomes insecure when said friend calls her a hot mess. Gina shows Penelope a trick on how to attract animals.
6	"The Horse Who Loved Me"	Ross Bradley	Peter Kelly	May 22, 2026
Josh enters into a relationship with a female horse named Claudia who has an interesting background. Penelope and Fawn are evicted from a gay night club by a rude ferret, Cody, prompting Penelope to fight for her right to attend via a trivia game.
7	"The Polycule"	Henrique Jardim	Laurie Magers	May 22, 2026
Penelope has a threesome with a polyamorous marmot couple but soon gets mixed feelings on the ordeal. Josh and Ray attempt to get laid in an orgy, only to find out that it's painstakingly organized, much to the sex-crazed Ray's frustration. Fawn dates a red lynx named Conner, only to discover a deal-breaking secret after they have a night of passion.
8	"The Passion of Raynal Skidski"	Alex Salyer	Ismael Loutfi	May 22, 2026
Ray begins dating a goose teacher, but insecure feelings arise when he suspects she likes her co-worker Gregg (also a swan). Fawn dates a jock goat, Arnold, but is desperate to be in the relationship that she keeps ignoring his red flags. Josh and Penelope try to be platonic life partners.
9	"The All-Nighter"	Ross Bradley	Kyle Lau	May 22, 2026
After his romance with Addy goes up in smoke, Ray regresses to his party animal ways and Penelope has to pick up the pieces. Fawn reunites with Dylan and learns he's getting married. Josh gets into a strange situation when he begins dating Simone, a seductive mink who's being followed by her deranged ex-boyfriend, AJ, a honey badger.
10	"The Wolf Wedding"	Henrique Jardim	Ashly Burch, Jackie Clarke, and Laurie Magers	May 22, 2026
The friends crash Dylan's wedding and each have their own romantic adventure; Fawn attempts to tell Dylan she still loves him but hits it off with the bride, an antelope named Cynthia. Ray and Josh attempt to have relations with two bridesmaid beavers, but their picks end up being incompatible with them. Penelope hits if off with Jojo, an artist vixen.

== Production ==
Mating Season was first announced by Netflix in April 2025 on the heels of the final season of Big Mouth which was released in May 2025. The series was created by Andrew Goldberg, Nick Kroll, Mark Levin, and Jennifer Flackett, who also served as executive producers. The series came from Brutus Pink and Titmouse, Inc. Casting for the series was announced with Kroll, Sabrina Jalees, Zach Woods and June Diane Raphael on board. Mark Rivers, who composed the score for Big Mouth, returned to provide new songs and music for the series. A soundtrack for the show was released around the same time as the show, including a song provided by the indie band AJR.

== Release ==
Mating Season was released on Netflix on May 22, 2026.

== Reception ==
The review aggregator website Rotten Tomatoes reported a 71% approval rating based on 14 critic reviews, with an average rating of 6.0/10. Metacritic, which uses a weighted average, gave a score of 67 out of 100 based on 9 critics, indicating "generally favorable" reviews.
