= Cake Train =

- Kroll Show episode
- Episode no.: Season 2 Episode 1
- Directed by: Jonathan Krisel
- Written by: Nick Kroll; Jon Daly; Carol Kolb; Jonathan Krisel; John Levenstein; Gabe Liedman; Joe Mande; Christine Nangle; Joe Wengert
- Cinematography by: Christian Sprenger
- Editing by: Bill Benz; Daniel Gray Longino
- Original air date: January 14, 2014
- Running time: 22 minutes

Guest appearances
- Zach Galifianakis as the cake tosser; Bill Burr as the Detective; Will Forte as a photographer; Marc Evan Jackson as Walter 'The Wallet'; Brandon Molale as The Belt; Chelsea Peretti as a Kroll Solutions employee; Lucy Punch as Violet; Jenny Slate as herself, Liz. B and Denise

Episode chronology
← Previous "Please God"	Next → "#canadiansafesex"

"Cake Train" is the first episode of the second season of the American sketch comedy series Kroll Show. The episode was written by series creator Nick Kroll, along with Jon Daly, Ron Funches, Carol Kolb, Jonathan Krisel, John Levenstein, Gabe Liedman, Joe Mande, Christine Nangle and Joe Wengert. In the United States, the episode originally aired on Comedy Central on January 14, 2014.

The episode marks the return of several characters from the previous season, and features Zach Galifianakis in the titular sketch, "Cake Train". The skit was conceived during the writing of the series' pilot episode; the sketch was rejected for its expense during both the production of the pilot and the first season. The series was renewed for a second season consisting of 10 episodes by Comedy Central in January 2013. The episode, which received generally positive critical reception, was watched by 763,000 viewers and received a Nielsen household rating of 0.4 in the 18–49 demographic.

== Synopsis ==
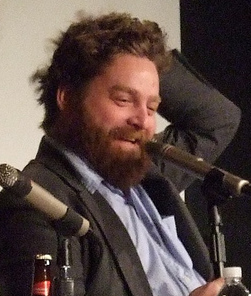
The episode guest stars Zach Galifianakis (pictured) as the cake tosser in "Cake Train".

The episode begins with the titular skit, "Cake Train", featuring people rushing to catch cakes being thrown off a moving train by Zach Galifianakis, filmed in slow motion. Afterwards, in a parody reality television series entitled Dad Academy, C-Czar (Nick Kroll) returns to find a child he had with his girlfriend "Pretty" Liz B. (Jenny Slate) has been birthed, and must learn how to parent. Later, in "PubLIZity", Liz B. and her co-worker and friend, Liz C. (also portrayed by Kroll), must learn to work together while at a public relations firm. Lastly, the Oh, Hello men – Gil Faizon and George St. Geegland (portrayed by Kroll and John Mulaney) – reprise their role in pranking friends and bystanders in their show, Too Much Tuna.

== Production ==
The "Cake Train" sketch was conceived during the writing of the series' pilot episode. As it utilizes a moving train, the sketch was rejected as being "too expensive" during producing of both the pilot and the first season. The series was renewed for a second season consisting of 10 episodes by Comedy Central in January 2013. Bradford Evans of Splitsider described the announcement as a "testament" to its high ratings, faith in the series by the network and its popularity on the Internet. Nick Kroll jokingly stated the sketch became their "priority of the season" after its renewal; the skit was shot last during production, and became the most expensive sketch produced in the series.

The episode marks the return of characters Gil Faizon and George St. Geegland of Oh, Hello since being featured in the season 1 episode, "Too Much Tuna". According to Kroll, the characters were conceived through his and John Mulaney's experiences in New York. The episode also reprises C-Czar since being featured in "Ice Dating" and the characters Liz B. and Liz G. from "Please God". Katy Perry expressed interest in starring on the show through Twitter; Kroll stated that she wanted cast for "PubLIZity", but was busy in a recording session with Diplo.

== Reception ==
"Cake Train" originally aired on January 14, 2014 on Comedy Central in the United States. The episode was watched by 763,000 viewers upon its premiere, and received a Nielsen household rating of 0.4 in the 18–49 demographic. The episode saw digital distribution on Amazon Video, iTunes and Vudu upon its broadcast.

The episode received generally positive critical reception; David Sims of The A.V. Club gave the episode an A−, confident that as a season premiere, "Nick Kroll and his writers have really nailed down how to present the serialized nature of their sketches over the upcoming weeks." He specifically praised the titular sketch as Impressionistic and found it to diverge from the format of the previous season by "[weaving] into the texture of the episode a little bit, giving the audience a strong hit of decadence and absurdity".

Writing for Paste, Laura Jayne Martin scored the episode 8 out of 10, stating that while most of the sketches didn't make her laugh, she noted it to invoke an experience of "internal recognition of humor", where "the joke or concept is funny, but also displays a keen sharpness that lacerates the reality it mocks." Kroll expressed that the titular sketch "is an anomaly within our show in that it's absurdist and it's not terribly character driven. But it's in the spirit of our show in that if we find something funny we'll play it as hard as we can." Erik Voss of Splitsider called the skit "beautifully shot" and stated the episode's "dark undertones, nonsense wordplay, and editing flourishes ... provide the humor here."
