= Alex & Emma =

- Theatrical release poster
- Directed by: Rob Reiner
- Written by: Jeremy Leven
- Produced by: Rob Reiner; Jeremy Leven; Alan Greisman; Todd Black; Elie Samaha
- Starring: Kate Hudson; Luke Wilson; Sophie Marceau; David Paymer
- Cinematography: Gavin Finney
- Edited by: Alan Edward Bell; Robert Leighton
- Music by: Marc Shaiman
- Production companies: Franchise Pictures; Escape Artists
- Distributed by: Warner Bros. Pictures
- Release date: June 20, 2003
- Running time: 96 minutes
- Country: United States
- Language: English
- Budget: $30 million
- Box office: $15.4 million

Alex & Emma is a 2003 American romantic comedy-drama film directed by Rob Reiner and starring Kate Hudson and Luke Wilson. Written by Jeremy Leven, the film is about a writer who must publish a novel in thirty days or face the wrath of loan sharks.

Alex & Emma was released by Warner Bros. Pictures on June 20, 2003. The film received negative reviews from critics and was a box office bomb, grossing $15.4 million against a $30 million budget.

== Plot ==
Alex Sheldon, a struggling writer, has writer's block and is heavily in debt. His publisher will not give him the money for his pending novel until it is finished. Alex must repay US$100,000 to the Cuban mafia and is given a 30-day ultimatum to pay the money he owes or they will kill him. And the only solution to this big problem is to finish his novel. Or rather, to start it, since he has not written one single line. But he has an idea for the story: A comedy about "the powerlessness of being in love, how love devours the insides of a person like a deadly virus".

He decides to hire the services of Emma Dinsmore, a stubborn stenographer, for her help to write the novel. The novel tells the story of Adam Shipley, a writer who has been hired to tutor the children of an attractive French woman. She is going through bad economic times, and Adam falls in love, despite the failed temptations of the au pair.

As Alex dictates his novel to Emma, the movie cuts away to scenes from the novel, where Adam interacts with a series of nannies, and falls for the last one. As they work together, Emma begins to question his ideas. It starts to affect his life as well as his work. They soon fall for each other.

Alas, after finishing the book, Emma discovers that the French woman in the story was based on a real person, a former girlfriend of Alex. His ex just broke up with her latest boyfriend, sitting with him in a café she invites him to a charity ball. Alex soon realizes that the person he really wants to be with is Emma.

After the book is done and handed in to his publisher he pays off his debt. Then, after much prodding, he convinces Emma to rewrite the ending of the book in which Alex has changed. He shows her he wants her to be an important part of his life. Emma loves it, Alex professes his love to her, and they kiss.

== Cast ==
- Kate Hudson as Emma Dinsmore / Ylva / Elsa / Eldora / Anna
- Luke Wilson as Alex Sheldon / Adam Shipley
- Sophie Marceau as Polina Delacroix
- David Paymer as John Shaw
- Rob Reiner as Wirschafter
- François Giroday as Croupier
- Lobo Sebastian as Bobby / Flamenco Dancer No. 1
- Chino XL as Tony / Flamenco Dancer No. 2
- Paul Willson as Whistling John Shaw
- Alexander Wauthier as Andre Delacroix
- Leili Kramer as Michele Delacroix
- Rip Taylor as Polina's Father
- Gigi Bermingham as Madame Blanche
- Jordan Lund as Claude
- Robert Costanzo as Bus Driver
- Cloris Leachman as Grandmother
- Earl Carroll as Bernard Pompier
- Jordi Caballero as Flamenco Dancer No. 3
- Michael St. Michaels as Casino Owner
- Danica Sheridan as Receptionist

== Production ==
Developed under the working title, Loosely Based on a True Love Story, the film is loosely based on a true love story of author Fyodor Dostoevsky, who dictated his 1866 novel, The Gambler in 30 days in order to pay off a gambling debt and, in the process, fell in love with his young stenographer.

The film was modeled after the 1964 Audrey Hepburn film Paris When It Sizzles.

== Reception ==
Alex & Emma was a box-office bomb, grossing $15 million at the box office, against a $30 million production budget.

On review aggregator Rotten Tomatoes, the film holds an 11% approval rating based on 141 reviews, with an average rating of 3.80/10. The site's critical consensus states: "A dull and unfunny comedy where the leads fail to generate any sparks." On Metacritic, the film has a weighted average score of 32 out of 100, based on 35 critics, indicating "generally unfavorable" reviews. Audiences polled by CinemaScore gave the film an average grade of "B−" on an A+ to F scale.

Todd McCarthy of Variety called it "A desperately slight romantic comedy marked by contrived romance and little comedy." Roger Ebert of the Chicago Sun-Times observed that the fictional novel within the film was "complete crap" and was critical of the film, but said it was not as bad as Reiner's The Story of Us.

Peter Travers of Rolling Stone was positive about the cast and wrote: "Reiner gets lucky with his two stars. Wilson has charm to spare, and Hudson brings humor and sexiness to playing Emma and four au pair girls from different countries. But even they can't float a balloon with lead in it." Desson Thomson of The Washington Post wrote: "The inside story is weak, dull and head-poundingly boring, and the outside story is only slightly better, thanks to the lukewarm likability of its two stars."
