= Return to Nim's Island =

2013 film by Brendan Maher

- Theatrical poster
- Based on: Nim at Sea by Wendy Orr
- Written by: Ray Boseley; Cathy Randal
- Directed by: Brendan Maher
- Starring: Bindi Irwin; Matthew Lillard; Toby Wallace; John Waters
- Composer: Nerida Tyson-Chew
- Country of origin: Australia

Production
- Producer: Paula Mazur
- Cinematography: Judd Overton
- Editor: Geoffrey Lamb
- Running time: 90 minutes
- Production companies: Walden Media; Arc Entertainment; The Mazur Kaplan Company; Pictures in Paradise

Original release
- Network: Hallmark Channel
- Release: March 15, 2013

Return to Nim's Island is a 2013 Australian adventure-fantasy film directed by Brendan Maher and starring Bindi Irwin, Matthew Lillard, Toby Wallace and John Waters. It premiered on the Walden Family Theater film series on the Hallmark Channel.

The story is based on the book Nim at Sea by Wendy Orr. It is the sequel to the 2008 film Nim's Island.

== Plot ==
Three years after the events of Nim's Island, the island faces a new challenge. The operators of the ship Buccaneer have gotten permission to build a pirate resort on the island, and 14-year-old Nim and her father pursue separate plans to stop them. Meanwhile, a city boy named Edmund, who has met Nim once before and decided to see her again, has run away from home to the island, inadvertently bringing poachers with him. With her father, Jack Rusoe away on the mainland, Nim must learn to work with Edmund in order to save the island from the poachers.

== Cast ==
- Bindi Irwin as Nim Rusoe
- John Waters as Booker
- Toby Wallace as Edmund
- Matthew Lillard as Jack Rusoe
- Sebastian Gregory as Frankie
- Jack Pearson as Ben
- Nathan Derrick as Felix
- BJ and Friday as Selkie
- Pumpkin as Fred

== Production ==
The film was shot in the Gold Coast, Australia. It was produced by Walden Media and Arc Entertainment in the Walden Family Theater film series on the Hallmark Channel. Return To Nim's Island premiered on 15 March 2013, followed by the DVD release at Walmart on 19 March. It was released in movie theatres in Australia on 4 April 2013.

== Reception ==
Jim Schembri of 3AW rated it 3 out of 5 and wrote: "This message-driven film is perfectly fine for kids around 10, though it is a little light on humour. Adults accompanying said kids, though, are strongly advised not to think too hard as the predictable tale unfolds." Louise Keller of Urban Cinefile praised the "inspired casting of Bindi Irwin" calling her "a natural in the role".
