= Peter Colt =

Peter Colt may refer to:

- Peter Colt, Connecticut State Treasurer (1790–1794)
- Peter Colt, character in Wimbledon (film), a 2004 British romantic comedy film
