= Human Resources (TV series) =

2022 American adult animated sitcom

- Genre: Animated sitcom; Blue comedy; Workplace comedy; Musical
- Created by: Kelly Galuska; Nick Kroll; Andrew Goldberg; Mark Levin; Jennifer Flackett
- Based on: Big Mouth by: Nick Kroll; Andrew Goldberg; Mark Levin; Jennifer Flackett
- Starring: Aidy Bryant; Randall Park; Keke Palmer; David Thewlis; Brandon Kyle Goodman; Maya Rudolph; Nick Kroll
- Opening theme: "Make Me Feel" by Janelle Monáe
- Composer: Mark Rivers
- Country of origin: United States
- Original language: English
- No. of seasons: 2
- No. of episodes: 20

Production
- Executive producers: Kelly Galuska; Nick Kroll; Andrew Goldberg; Mark Levin & Jennifer Flackett
- Producers: Max Silvestri; Mitra Jouhari; Nate Funaro; Abe Forman-Greenwald
- Editor: Felipe Salazar
- Running time: 25–28 minutes
- Production companies: Brutus Pink; Dance Face; Titmouse, Inc.

Original release
- Network: Netflix
- Release: March 18, 2022 – June 9, 2023

Related
- Big Mouth

Human Resources is an American adult animated sitcom that served as a spin-off and subseries to Big Mouth, centering around the workplace of the Hormone Monsters depicted in the series. Created by Kelly Galuska, Nick Kroll, Andrew Goldberg, Mark Levin, and Jennifer Flackett for Netflix, the spin-off series was announced in October 2019. It premiered on March 18, 2022, and stars Aidy Bryant, Randall Park, and Keke Palmer. The series has received positive reviews, and was renewed for a second season in April 2022. The second season was released on June 9, 2023. In April 2023, Netflix confirmed that the series was canceled after two seasons.

== Premise ==
Human Resources is a workplace comedy set in the world of the monsters from Big Mouth, in which the monsters are assigned to a group of human adults as their representation of feelings.

== Cast and characters ==
=== Main ===
- Aidy Bryant as Emmy Fairfax, an amateur female Lovebug that gets assigned to Becca after Sonya was fired from her position.
- Randall Park as Peter "Pete" Doheny, a Logic Rock that represents logic within humans.
- Keke Palmer as Rochelle Hillhurst, a female Lovebug romantically involved with Dante and Emmy's best friend, who is assigned to Doug. Her client in Big Mouth was Missy Foreman-Greenwald.
- David Thewlis as Lionel St. Swithens, a Shame Wizard who haunts children, and sometimes adults, stoking and representing their deepest shame.
- Brandon Kyle Goodman as Walter Las Palmas, a male Lovebug who formed a close bond with Yara throughout her life. After Yara dies, he becomes her granddaughter Natalie's Lovebug. His client in Big Mouth was Nick Birch.
- Maya Rudolph as:
  - Constance "Connie" LaCienega, a Hormone Monstress who helps adolescent females go through puberty. Her clients in Big Mouth were Jessi Glaser and briefly, despite being male, Nick Birch.
  - Grace, an uptight anthropomorphic blue hippopotamus who serves as the manager of Human Resources. She was voiced by Jessica Chaffin in Big Mouth and has a new design.
- Nick Kroll as:
  - Maurice "Maury" Beverley, a raspy-voiced Hormone Monster who helps adolescent males go through puberty. His clients in Big Mouth were Duke Ellington, Andrew Glouberman, and Matthew Macdell.
  - Rick, an elderly disfigured, but experienced Hormone Monster that helps people through words of enthusiasm. His clients in Big Mouth were Coach Steve and Nick Birch.
  - Todd, a zombie who works as an electrician at Human Resources.
  - Kroll also voices the priest who marries Doug and his fiancée, and Cocky Balls-Boa, one of Maury's dicks modeled after Rocky Balboa.

=== Recurring ===
- Pamela Adlon as Sonya Poinsettia, a former Lovebug turned bartender who was fired for having come into contact with Claudia, outside of her assigned human, Becca. Her client in Big Mouth was Jessi Glaser.
- Maria Bamford as:
  - Tito Taylor Thomas the Anxiety Mosquito, a female Mosquito that represents anxiety in humans.
  - Kitty Dukakis the Depression Kitty, an anthropomorphic purple cat employed in the Department of Puberty's Depression Ward. She was voiced by Jean Smart in Big Mouth.
- Ali Wong as Becca Lee, an Asian-American lawyer who becomes a first-time mother, to which the monsters are assigned.
- Mike Birbiglia as Barry, Becca's goofy Jewish husband.
- Bobby Cannavale as Gavin Reeves, an impulsive, intense Hormone Monster who takes his job seriously to Maury's annoyance. He is later killed off in the season finale, "Shitstorm". His client in Big Mouth was briefly Natalie prior to her transition.
  - Cannavale also voices Guyvin, Gavin's identical, but suspiciously nice, twin brother.
- John Gemberling as Tyler Pico, an immature teenage Hormone Monster that was fired from his position for working with Lionel in the second season of Big Mouth. He previously worked as Gavin's assistant, who he gets constantly harassed and abused for his amusement, and serves as Barry's own Hormone Monster.
- Hugh Jackman as Dante the Addiction Angel, who starts the series involved with Emmy but later dates Rochelle.
- Rosie Perez as Petra the Ambition Gremlin, a Gremlin that represents human ambitions.
- Thandiwe Newton as Mona, a British-accented Hormone Monstress that is a chaotic influence on adolescent females. She is often seen holding a lighter in her hand. Her client in Big Mouth was Missy Foreman-Greenwald.
- Harvey Guillén as José, a hapless anthropomorphic Spider who is the Receptionist of Human Resources.
- Tim Robinson as Doug Fredrick, an arrogant newlywed man who is a massive fan of the Phoenix Suns.
- Ashley London as Donna Fredrick, Doug's loving newlywed wife.
- Chris O'Dowd as Flanny O'Lympic, Barry's Lovebug who speaks in an Irish accent.
- Sabrina Jalees as Nadja El-Khoury, a Lebanese-American high school student and Natalie's older sister who gets accepted to the University of California, Berkeley while in a personal conflict with her girlfriend after she got accepted to Rutgers University.
- Josie Totah as Natalie El-Khoury, a transgender teenager who debuted in the fourth season of Big Mouth. In Human Resources, she is revealed to be Nadja's younger sister.
- Nidah Barber-Raymond as Yara El-Khoury, Natalie's and Nadja's ailing paternal grandmother, Amir's mother, Nabilah's mother-in-law, and Walter's client that was close to him.
- Ahmed Mawas as Amir El-Khoury, Natalie's and Nadja's father, Nabilah's husband, and Yara's son.
- Ulka Simone Mohanty as Nabilah El-Khoury, Natalie's and Nadja's mother and Amir's wife.
- Gil Ozeri as Gil, a Hormone Monster and Joe's best friend.
- Joe Wengert as Joe, a Hormone Monster and Gil's best friend.
- Henry Winkler as Keith from Grief, an anthropomorphic sweater from the Grief department.
- Cole Escola as Montel, Maury's and Connie's biological non-binary child who was born during the events of Big Mouth.
- Miley Cyrus as Van, Sarah's nihilistic female Logic Rock who discourages her from opening herself up to others.
- Florence Pugh as Sarah Krumhorn, Van and Emmy's client and Paul's daughter who has become socially withdrawn due to her mom's death and skipping out on her last chance to see her alive.
- Jason Mantzoukas as Ben, Sarah's love interest.
- Eugene Levy as Paul Krumhorn, Sarah's estranged father who is also suffering from the death of his wife.
- Niecy Nash as Hope, an excitable incarnation of hope who encourages others to feel hopeful.
- Isabella Rossellini as General Malice, the head of the Hate Department who tries to recruit Rochelle.
- Jemaine Clement as Simon Sex, a sensitive, shroom-taking Hormone Monster and a friend of Maury.
- Alice Wong as a fictionalized version of herself who consults with a lesbian couple, who are parents with a child struggling to speak.
- Eugene Cordero as Shawn, a mutual friend of Alice's.
- Helen Mirren (season 1) and Juliet Mills (season 2) as Rita St. Swithens, a renowned Shame Wizard and Lionel's mother.

=== Guest stars ===
- Lupita Nyong'o as Asha, a Kenyan Shame Wizard and Arsalan's wife with whom Lionel has a one-night stand.
- Janelle Monáe as Claudia, Becca's doula who once fell in love with Sonya.
- John Mulaney as Andrew Glouberman, a Jewish-American teenage boy and Maury's client who spends much of his time furtively masturbating. A main character from Big Mouth.
- Ariana DeBose as Danielle, Nadja's girlfriend who got accepted to Rutgers University which leads her into a personal conflict.
- James III as Cat Stevens, Barry's male Depression Kitty who is seen wearing headphones on his neck.
- Kayvan Novak as Arsalan, a Shame Wizard and Asha's husband.
- James Adomian as the Need Demon, a demon that manifests Becca's baby.
- Casey Wilson as Empathy Mulholland, an anthropomorphic Owl who represents empathy and the Hormone Monsters sex counselor.
- Jon Lovitz as Schmitty from Pity, a condescending anthropomorphic onion who patronizes individuals who are feeling down.
- Sam Richardson as Tony, a common cold germ
- Jackée Harry as Deb, a woman that Paul goes on a date with for one night.

== Episodes ==
Season	Episodes	Originally released
1	10	March 18, 2022
2	10	June 9, 2023

=== Season 1 (2022) ===
No. overall	No. in season	Title	Directed by	Written by	Original release date
1	1	"Birth"	Henrique Jardim	Kelly Galuska, Nick Kroll, Andrew Goldberg, Mark Levin & Jennifer Flackett	March 18, 2022
When Sonya gets fired, an amateur Lovebug named Emmy tries to take over her client, a stressed-out pregnant lady named Becca. It's Maury's birthday, but he does not feel like celebrating. Joe and Gil get stuck on the elevator and soon end up in a division floor full of monsters of enlightenment.
2	2	"Training Day"	Bryan Francis	Victor Quinaz	March 18, 2022
When the Hormone Monsters' chronic fornicating begins disrupting work, they are forced to take Sensitivity Training, but Mona is quite incorrigible about her horny instincts. In hopes to encourage Emmy, Walter takes her to meet with a client of his, an aging Mid-Eastern woman named Yara. Pete the Logic Rock is annoyed when Rochelle begins encouraging a client they share together named Doug to be superfluous with finances.
3	3	"Bad Mummies"	Alex Salyer	L.E. Correia	March 18, 2022
The Shame Wizard, real name Lionel, is desperate for his mother Rita to approve of him, but soon discovers a shocking secret about her regarding the Depression Kitty. Emmy tries to get Becca to love her child. Connie offers to look after Maury's dicks, but she ends up getting in over her head.
4	4	"Rutgers is for Lovers"	Henrique Jardim	Mitra Jouhari	March 18, 2022
Rochelle and Petra the Ambition Gremlin end up clashing on what college their client Nadja (the sister of Natalie from Big Mouth) should go to based on how it will affect her relationship with her girlfriend Danielle, leading to tensions at the high-school prom. Pete discovers that Emmy and Rochelle have been calling him a awkward nickname behind his back for five decades and is quite ticked off. Maury and Connie attempt to spice up their sex life.
5	5	"Love in the Time of Postpartum"	Bryan Francis	Monique Moses	March 18, 2022
Becca and her husband Barry's marriage begins to hit a rough patch when Becca goes back to work, which leads to both of their monster teams to see if they should divorce. When Maury and Connie find out that Sonya has been drowning her sorrows at a bar, they try to set her up with Rick, leading to strange results.
6	6	"The Addiction Angel"	Alex Salyer	Max Silvestri	March 18, 2022
Dante the Addiction Angel causes a problem when he becomes Doug's new creature and puts him on a strict exercise program for the sake of fitting into his wedding suit. Joe and Gil steal Andrew from Maury to avoid losing their jobs, but they find that Andrew's non-stop masturbating is too much for them. Lionel tries to help Emmy kick her obsession with Dante when he dumps her.
7	7	"International Creature Convention"	Henrique Jardim	Mitra Jouhari & Caleb Hearon	March 18, 2022
The monsters go to a convention in North Korea where Emmy gets angry at Rochelle for being with Dante, Maury and Connie take their relationship to the next level and Lionel is roped into an aggressive threesome with a Shame Wizard couple.
8	8	"The Light"	Bryan Francis	Brandon Kyle Goodman	March 18, 2022
Sonya tells Emmy why she got fired; she hooked up with Becca's doula Claudia who ended up seeing her glow. Maury and Gavin become competitors in a cockfight.
9	9	"It's Almost Over"	Alex Salyer	Victor Quinaz	March 18, 2022
When Yara begins to die, Walter and Pete find themselves visited by a walking sweater named Keith from Grief who tries to help them and Yara's family cope, but they are anything but thrilled to have him. Emmy and Rochelle have a spat at the office regarding what happened at the convention earlier in the season. Note: This episode is dedicated to Willie Garson, who died in 2021, after voicing characters on Big Mouth.
10	10	"Shitstorm"	Henrique Jardim	L.E. Correia	March 18, 2022
A huge storm causes a blackout at Human Resources causing the monsters to be unable to open portals to Earth and Gavin, Pete, Lionel, Petra, Walter, and Dante go to solve the problem. Becca, Doug and their spouses meet during the storm and tensions rise on account of Emmy and Rochelle. Maury gets pregnant but Connie is incredibly apprehensive about parenthood but things may change when Connie tries to save Maury when he gets trapped in the bathroom. Joe and Gil try to eat all of the food in the fridge during the blackout.

=== Season 2 (2023) ===
No. overall	No. in season	Title	Directed by	Written by	Original release date
11	1	"The Jizz Mitzvah"	Alex Salyer	Kelly Galuska	June 9, 2023
On eve of Montel's Jizz Mitzvah (a ceremony where a Hormone Monster masturbates in public), Maury and Connie are befuddled when Montel decides they want to be a Shame Wizard. Emmy gains a new client who is rather adverse to the idea of romance, mostly due to the influence of her romance-hating Logic Rock, Van. Pete is forced to confess that he severed one of Dante the Addiction Angel's 3 penis' in last season's finale, which puts Rochelle in awkward position when Dante requests that she stop being friends with Pete.
12	2	"The Tell-Tale Dick"	Henrique Jardim	Victor Quinaz	June 9, 2023
Pete is being harassed by Dante's severed dick. Lionel gets scared when Gavin's brother, Guyvin, visits and asks him about the details of Gavin's demise last season. Rochelle and Petra visit Rochelle's client Alice, a woman with spinal muscular atrophy, alongside an incarnation of Hope, but a misunderstanding involving a potential date has Rochelle be resentful of Hope.
13	3	"Total RePaul"	Bryan L Francis	Max Silvestri	June 9, 2023
Walter tries to help an elderly client of his named Paul move past his deceased wife Evelyn by taking him on a vacation, but Paul soon feels as though Walter doesn't know him on a personal level. Pete gets advice from Maury on how to get Dante's penis to leave him alone after failing to kill it multiple times. Gil and Joe agree to get rid of a bunch of lobsters in Emmy's apartment in exchange for a special bagel she is saving, but the task proves to be harder than they expected.
14	4	"A League of Their Hormone"	Alex Salyer	L.E. Correia	June 9, 2023
A softball match between the Hormone Monsters and the Shame Wizards leads to Montel, who joined the Shame Wizard team, to be a star player, much to Connie's consternation as she prides herself on being the best softball player there ever was. Emmy's attempts to encourage Sarah to start a relationship with a guy end up turning sour when Sarah's mother is brought up. A Hate Worm-turned Rochelle ends up venting her hatefulness by having intercourse with Pete, who becomes conflicted about the whole ordeal.
15	5	"Rochelle, Rochelle"	Henrique Jardim	Anna Salinas	June 9, 2023
We are shown two timelines of what might happen when Rochelle decides to embrace her Hate Worm identity and what might happen if she decided to be a Love Bug again.
16	6	"Paul Me By Your Name"	Bryan L Francis	Shantira Jackson	June 9, 2023
Walter's Hormone Monster boyfriend, Simon Sex, moves in with him, but Simon's gross habits end up getting on Walter's nerves. Paul decides to date again to take his mind off his late wife. Emmy's drive to find out why Sarah's mother is a touchy subject for her leads her to take a look into the Memory Bank, a section of the monster world where the human memories lie, but she gets more than what she bargained for.
17	7	"Tony: The Life of an Office Cold"	Alex Salyer	Caleb Hearon & Jordan Mendoza	June 9, 2023
A germ named Tony ends up spreading a cold across the office and this leads to almost everyone present getting sick.
18	8	"Pity Party"	Henrique Jardim	L.E. Correia	June 9, 2023
Mona and Lionel throw competing parties against each other and things soon escalate with Maury and Connie in a compromising position with him. Petra is called in to help a non-verbal four-year-old speak up to his lesbian mothers, but when Alice gets involved, things spiral out-of-control.
19	9	"On the Daughterfront"	Bryan L Francis	Max Silvestri & Walter Kelly	June 9, 2023
Emmy resorts to desperate measures to make sure Sarah feels love when her father, previously revealed to be Paul, asks her to get her stuff out of her old bedroom, which leads to a pool of bittersweet memories that has Sarah, and by extension Van, to rethink their stance on love. Montel has to choose between a Hormone Monster college and a Shame Wizard college.
20	10	"Yipee Ki-Hate, Motherf**ker"	Alex Salyer & Chris Ybarra	L.E. Correia	June 9, 2023
Rochelle unintentionally inspires all the hate-themed monsters to crash a holiday party and take over the system and the resulting Die Hard-like scenario has Rochelle regret her hateful ways and tries to save the day. Joe and Gil end up escaping being caught and attempt to take matters into their own hands.

== Production ==
On October 3, 2019, Netflix announced a straight-to-series order for a spin-off series titled Human Resources, set within the show's universe. Kroll, Goldberg, Levin, Flackett, Nate Funaro, and Kelly Galuska were set to executive produce. On June 14, 2021, more details of the series were announced, including casting. Nick Kroll, Maya Rudolph, and David Thewlis reprised their roles for the spin-off as Maurice the Hormone Monster, Connie the Hormone Monstress, and the Shame Wizard, with additional cast members Brandon Kyle Goodman, Keke Palmer, Aidy Bryant, and Randall Park joining the series. On October 15, 2021, it was announced that Pamela Adlon has joined the spin-off, reprising her role as Sonya the Lovebug, and Goodman's and Palmer's roles were revealed. On January 12, 2022, it was reported that Rosie Perez, Jemaine Clement, Thandiwe Newton, Bobby Cannavale, Henry Winkler, and Maria Bamford were cast in the series, with Cannavale, Bamford, Newton and Clement reprising their roles from Big Mouth. The series was released on March 18, 2022.

On March 1, 2022, an official trailer was released with Helen Mirren, Lupita Nyong'o, Chris O'Dowd, Harvey Guillén, Janelle Monáe, Mike Birbiglia, Tim Robinson, Hugh Jackman and Ali Wong joining the spin-off. Jackman previously guest-starred in Big Mouth voicing a fictional version of himself, being depicted as one of Maury's dicks and Wong has voiced recurring character Ali since the third season. Later that same month, Kroll revealed the remainder of the cast for the series through social media. On April 18, 2022, Netflix renewed the series for a second season. On April 24, 2023, it was announced that the second season is going to be the final season. In May 2023, an official trailer was released with Florence Pugh, Miley Cyrus, Eugene Levy, Isabella Rossellini, Sam Richardson, Niecy Nash, and Jason Mantzoukas joining the series. Like Jackman and Wong, Mantzoukas previously voiced acted in Big Mouth as Jay Bilzerian. The final season premiered on June 9, 2023.

== Reception ==
On review aggregator website Rotten Tomatoes, season one holds a 90% approval rating based on 20 critic reviews, with an average rating of 7.4/10. The website's critics consensus reads, "The Hormone Monsters are pushing paper and phalluses in Human Resources, a workplace spinoff of Big Mouth that's just as raunchy and sweet." On Metacritic, the series has a score of 72 out of 100, based on 6 critic reviews, indicating "generally favorable reviews".

Elly Belle of The A.V. Club gave the series a B and said, "Familiarity with Big Mouth may bring in viewers, but Human Resources' distinctive humor and commentary on humanity will keep them watching."
