= Journey to the Center of the Earth (2008 theatrical film) =

American sci-fi adventure film by Eric Brevig

- Theatrical release poster
- Directed by: Eric Brevig
- Screenplay by: Michael D. Weiss; Jennifer Flackett; Mark Levin
- Based on: Journey to the Center of the Earth by Jules Verne
- Produced by: Beau Flynn; Charlotte Huggins
- Starring: Brendan Fraser; Josh Hutcherson; Anita Briem
- Cinematography: Chuck Shuman
- Edited by: Paul Martin Smith; Dirk Westervelt; Steven Rosenblum
- Music by: Andrew Lockington
- Production companies: New Line Cinema; Walden Media
- Distributed by: Warner Bros. Pictures
- Release date: July 11, 2008
- Running time: 93 minutes
- Country: United States
- Language: English
- Budget: $60 million
- Box office: $245 million

Journey to the Center of the Earth (Note: Often marketed as Journey to the Center of the Earth 3-D, or simply Journey 3D) is a 2008 American action-adventure film starring Brendan Fraser in the main role, alongside Josh Hutcherson and Anita Briem. Directed by Eric Brevig, it is an adaptation of Jules Verne's 1864 novel in which the novel exists within the film's universe. The 3D film tells the story of a volcanologist and his nephew who embark on a mission to go look for the former's missing brother with help from an Icelandic guide as they come across the center of the Earth.

Journey to the Center of the Earth was released on July 11, 2008, by Warner Bros. Pictures. It received mixed reviews from critics, and earned $245 million against a $60 million budget. The film also introduced the 4DX movie format, featuring "4D" motion effects in a specially designed cinema in Seoul, South Korea, using tilting seats and other effects to convey motion, wind, sprays of water and sharp air, probe lights to mimic lightning, fog, scents, and other theatrical special effects. A sequel, Journey 2: The Mysterious Island, was released on February 10, 2012, with only Hutcherson returning.

== Plot ==
In 2007, Trevor Anderson is a Bostonian volcanologist whose brother, Max, had disappeared ten years prior. Trevor learns at work that his brother's lab is being shut down because of a lack of funding. Elizabeth, Trevor's sister-in-law, drops off Sean, his 13-year-old nephew, at Trevor's house to spend ten days with him.

When Elizabeth drops him off, she leaves Trevor with a box of items that belonged to Max. Sean suddenly takes interest in what Trevor has to say after he tells him about his father, whom he never really had a chance to know.

In the box, Trevor discovers the novel Journey to the Center of the Earth by Jules Verne. Inside the book, Trevor finds notes written by Max, and realising the notes contain historical data from his seismometers, he brings Sean to his laboratory to check its current readings. After noticing that the readings match those of Max's notes, and that a previously dead seismometer in Iceland has started to transmit again, he decides to go to Iceland to investigate for himself.

Trevor intends to send Sean back to his mother, but relents at the latter's protests, so he brings Sean to Iceland with him. They start by looking for another volcanologist; Sigurbjörn Asgeirsson. When they arrive at Asgeirsson's institution, they meet his daughter Hannah, who informs them he died. She also tells them that both her father and Max believed that Jules Verne's books were factual accounts.

Hannah offers to help them climb up to the seismometer. While hiking the mountain, a lightning storm forces the three into a cave. The cave entrance collapses, trapping them, so they have no alternative but to go deeper into the cave. After descending a volcanic conduit, they stumble upon an abandoned mine.

Trevor, Sean, and Hannah investigate further into the mine and find a volcanic tube with walls containing various gems, including diamonds, which Sean takes. However, the muscovite they are standing on breaks, and they fall down the volcanic tube, taking them to the "Center of the Earth". They continue and discover Max's cave dwelling and his old journal.

Hannah and Trevor discover Max's dead body and bury him. Afterwards, they deduce from Max's journal that they must quickly leave, as the temperature is steadily rising.

Trevor figures out they must go to a geyser that can send them to the surface. They must do this within 48 hours or all of the water to create the geyser will be gone. They also realise they must get out before the temperature rises above 135 degrees. They build a raft to cross the underground ocean, towards the geyser.

During a storm, the trio are attacked by a school of piranhas, and Sean is separated from the group as the raft's sail flies away him holding onto it. Sean later awakes on a shore, and is guided by a glowing bird towards the river that leads to the geyser. At the same time, Trevor and Hannah have made it across the ocean, and they split up as Trevor is determined to find Sean. Sean encounters and flees from an albino Giganotosaurus, and after reuniting with Trevor, Trevor saves him by baiting the Giganotosaurus to fall through a sheet of muscovite. They reunite with Hannah at the river, but when they arrive at the geyser, it is dry. They realise that there is still water on the other side of the walls.

Trevor uses a flare to ignite magnesium in the walls, allowing the water to flow into the magma below, creating a geyser that shoots them out of Mount Vesuvius in Italy. With Sean having carried many diamonds with him, Trevor uses it to fund a new building for his brother's laboratory.

On the final day of Sean's visit with Trevor and Hannah, Trevor hands Sean a book titled "Atlantis" and suggests that they could hang out at Sean's during Christmas break. The glowing bird, also smuggled out by Sean in attempt to keep it as a pet, flies off from his bag.

== Cast ==
- Brendan Fraser as Professor Trevor Anderson, a volcanologist, Sean's paternal uncle and Max's brother.
- Josh Hutcherson as Sean Anderson, Trevor's nephew and Liz & Max's son.
- Aníta Briem as Hannah Ásgeirsdóttir, Sigurbjörn's daughter and Trevor's love interest.
- Seth Meyers as Professor Alan Kitzens
- Jean-Michel Paré as Maxwell "Max" Anderson, Sean's father, Trevor's brother and Liz's husband.
- Jane Wheeler as Elizabeth "Liz" Anderson, Sean's mother, Trevor's sister-in-law and Max's wife.
- Frank Fontaine as Old Man
- Giancarlo Caltabiano as Leonard
- Kaniehtiio Horn as Gum-Chewing Girl
- Garth Gilker as Sigurbjörn Ásgeirsson, Hannah's father.

== Production ==
=== Development and filming ===
In September 2001, Walden Media announced that Eric Brevig was hired and set to direct Journey to the Center of the Earth based on the book of the same name by Jules Verne. Michael D. Weiss, Mark Levin and Jennifer Flackett wrote the script for the film. Beau Flynn and Charlotte Huggins produced the film with the budget of $60 million for release in 2008. In 2003, Brendan Fraser, Anita Briem, Josh Hutcherson, Seth Meyers, Jean-Michel Paré, Jane Wheeler, Giancarlo Caltabiano and Garth Gilker joined the film. Andrew Lockington composed the music for the film. The development and filming of the film were completed in Canada and Iceland in March 2006, followed by principal photography and production which began on April 20. In January 2007, New Line Cinema acquired distribution rights to the film. The film transposes the novel into the present day and is mostly live action, with only the landscape and creatures supplied by computer-generated graphics. The film is projected using Real D Cinema and Dolby 3D.

Josh Hutcherson's character, Sean, is named after the professor and conservation biologist Dr. Sean Anderson.

The computer graphics in the film were produced by the Canadian company Meteor Studios, which declared bankruptcy immediately after having finished work on Journey to the Center of the Earth, leaving its employees and freelancers unpaid after having postponed their paychecks for three months; after a lawsuit and the direct intervention of Brendan Fraser, the former Meteor personnel settled for 70% of what was owed.

== Release ==
=== Marketing ===
The first trailer was shown before screenings of Meet the Robinsons, the re-release of The Nightmare Before Christmas and the release of Beowulf, with the Hannah Montana & Miley Cyrus: Best of Both Worlds Concert, and during the 2008 Kids' Choice Awards. Warner Bros. marketed the film like a theme park attraction. However, the studio had to slightly tweak the campaign (including dropping "3D" from the title) when it became clear that the film would be shown in 3-D in far fewer theaters than anticipated.

=== Theme parks ===
In May 2009, the film premiered as "Journey to the Center of the Earth 4-D" at Stone Mountain Park in Georgia. It also opened in the motion simulator at Dollywood under the same name on June 12 the same year. It also featured the new 4D Cinema at the Weston Super-Mare Grand Pier in the U.K. and was shown in Movieworld on the Gold Coast.

=== Home media ===
Journey to the Center of the Earth was released on DVD and Blu-ray on October 28, 2008, in standard 2D format as well as a magenta / green anaglyph. It opened at #2 at the DVD sales chart behind Tinker Bell, selling 843,224 units in the 1st week which translates to $13,238,617 in revenue. As per the latest figures, 1,642,994 DVD units have been sold, bringing in $25,346,260 in revenue. This doesn't include Blu-ray Disc sales / DVD rentals. The 2008 2-disc BD edition of the movie doesn't conform to the – only later established – 3D Blu-ray specifications, which means that this version doesn't take advantage of any dedicated 3D HDTVs, although it can be watched on 3D HDTVs, as well as on any other TV in anaglyph 3D, by using red-cyan paper glasses (four pairs are included). A 3D Blu-ray version was released on January 17, 2012. Both the "Standard 2D Version" and the 3D BD version, released in 2008 by Roadshow Home Entertainment in Australia, appeared under the title Journey to the Centre of the Earth.

== Reception ==
=== Critical response ===
On Rotten Tomatoes, it has an approval rating of 60% based on 159 reviews with an average rating of 6/10. The website's critical consensus reads: "Modern visuals and an old fashioned storyline make this family adventure/comedy a fast-paced, kitschy ride". Metacritic gave the film a 57 out of 100, based on 35 reviews, indicating "mixed or average" reviews. Audiences surveyed by CinemaScore gave the film a grade "A−" on scale of A to F.

Roger Ebert of the Chicago Sun-Times gave the film two stars out of four, and wrote: "This is a fairly bad movie, and yet at the same time maybe about as good as it could be. There may not be an 8-year-old alive who would not love it." Peter Travers of Rolling Stone gave it two and a half out of four, but warned "Remove a star from the rating if you take this Journey without wearing 3-D glasses. That's where the real fun comes in." Owen Gleiberman of Entertainment Weekly gave it a B− and said "Journey is just the new version of a 1950s comin'-at-ya roller coaster, with a tape measure, trilobite antennae, and giant snapping piranha thrust at the audience."

=== Box office ===
Journey to the Center of the Earth grossed $102 million in the United States and $143 million in other territories for a worldwide total of $245 million.

The film opened at #3 in North America, behind Hellboy II: The Golden Army and Hancock. The film grossed $21 million in 2,811 theaters in its first week of release with an average of $7,477. In its second weekend, it dropped to $12.3 million, and $9.7 million in its third.

=== Accolades ===
Award	Year	Category	Result	Cast/crew
Teen Choice Awards	2008	Choice Summer Movie: Action Adventure	Nominated	
Young Artist Award	2009	Best Performance in a Feature Film – Leading Young Actor	Nominated	Josh Hutcherson
BMI Film & TV Awards	2009		Won	Andrew Lockington
World Soundtrack Awards	2009	Discovery of the Year	Nominated	Andrew Lockington

== Sequel ==
In March 2009, New Line Cinema and Walden Media announced a sequel film, Journey 2: The Mysterious Island, starring Hutcherson, Dwayne Johnson, Michael Caine, Luis Guzman, and Vanessa Hudgens. Fraser and Briem did not return, and Jane Wheeler was replaced by Kristin Davis. Journey 2 was filmed between November 2010 and February 2011 and was released in February 2012. Like the first movie, the sequel was shot in 3D, and the script is loosely based on a Verne novel – The Mysterious Island.

== Journey to the Center of the Earth: 4-D Adventure ==
Journey to the Center of the Earth 4-D Adventure is a 15-minute 4D film shown at various 4D theatres all over the world. It retells the condensed story of the film with the help of 3D projection and sensory effects, including moving seats, wind, mist and scents. Produced by SimEx-Iwerks, the 4D experience premiered in 2009. Locations included Warner Bros. Movie World (2010–2012), Dollywood (2009–2012), Enchanted Kingdom (2009–), Stone Mountain, and Rainbow's End.

== See also ==
- List of films featuring dinosaurs
