= Septuagesimo Uno =

Public park in Manhattan, New York

Coordinates: 40°46′43.2″N 73°59′03.5″W

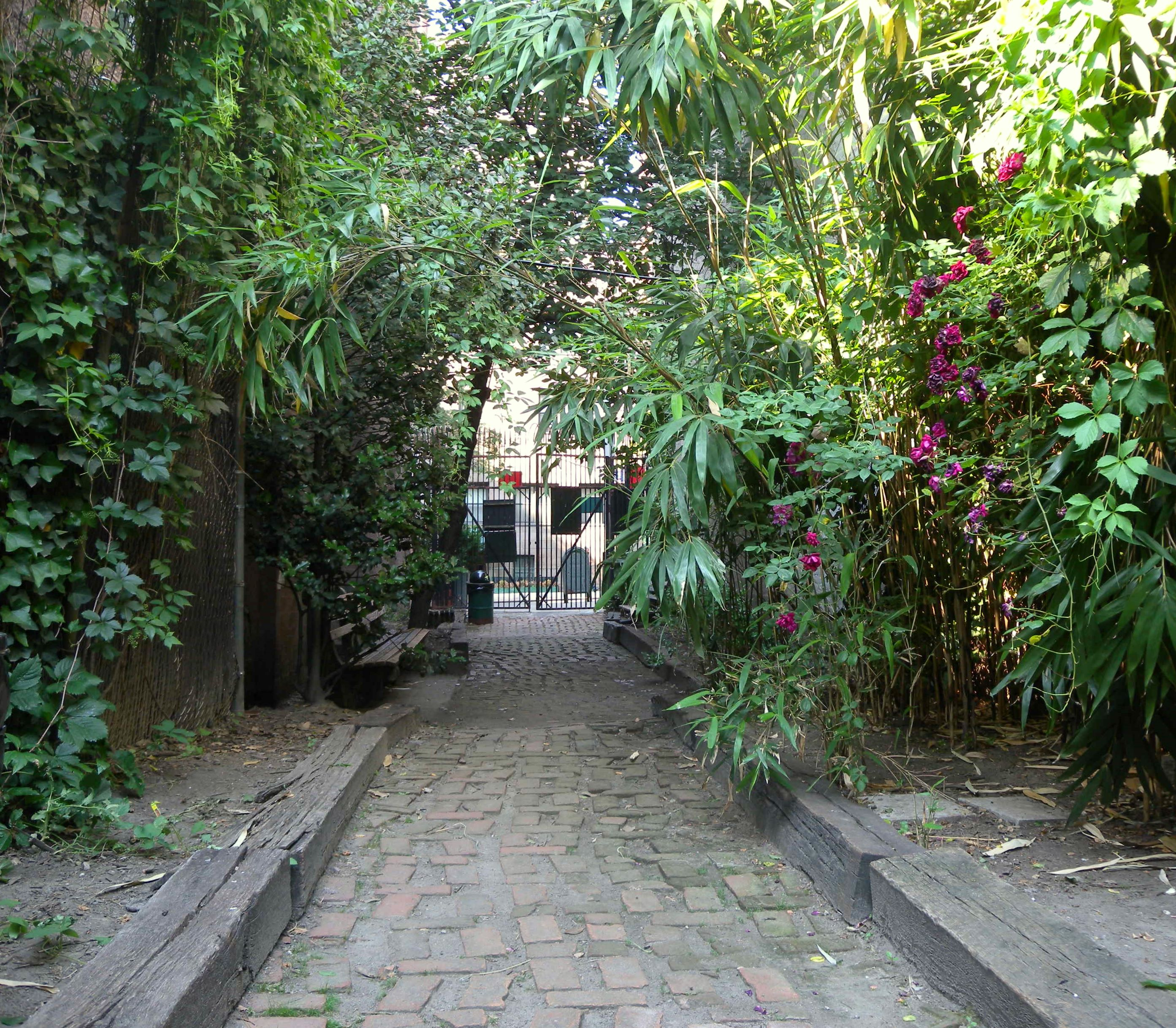

Septuagesimo Uno is a 0.04-acre (160 m^{2}) park on the Upper West Side of the New York City borough of Manhattan. It is located on 71st Street between West End Avenue to the west and the intersection of Broadway and Amsterdam Avenue to the east. The park's name is Latin for "seventy-first". The park is operated and maintained by the New York City Department of Parks and Recreation.

In the 1960s, Mayor John Lindsay started the Vest Pocket Park campaign to acquire vacant land for use as small parks. New York City acquired this property through condemnation on March 28, 1969. In May 1981, the Department of General Services transferred jurisdiction of the property to the New York State Office of Parks, Recreation and Historic Preservation. Originally named "71st Street Plot", in 2000 it was renamed by Parks Commissioner Henry Stern to improve its appeal. It was also featured in the 2005 movie Little Manhattan, starring Josh Hutcherson and Charlie Ray.
