= Loston Harris =

Loston Harris is an American jazz pianist and vocalist. Harris plays primarily from the Great American Songbook in a traditional style. He is a regular performer at various venues in New York City including Jazz at Lincoln Center, has recorded five albums, and appeared in a feature film.

== Biography ==
Loston Harris began his studies at Virginia Commonwealth University as a percussion major. After hearing Harris playing the piano, visiting professor Ellis Marsalis urged the percussionist to switch instruments. Harris later transferred to Howard University, where he studied piano with Geri Allen and Billy Taylor.

In 1995, Harris toured with Wynton Marsalis, and with Marcus Roberts the following year. He has released five albums, the most recent in 2013. Harris also appeared as himself in the 2005 film Little Manhattan. He currently leads the house band at the Carlyle Hotel’s Bemelmans Bar.

== Discography ==
- Stepping Stones (1996)
- Comes Love (1998)
- Timeless (2003)
- Why Try to Change Me Now? (2010)
- Swingfully Yours (2013)
