= Lily Kwong =

American landscape designer

Lily Kwong is a model and landscape designer. She is the founder and director of Studio Lily Kwong, a landscape design firm based in Los Angeles.

== Personal Life ==
Kwong married actor Nick Kroll in November 2020. They have two children together; a son born in January 2021 and a daughter born in November 2023.
