= Kroll Show =

American sketch comedy television series

- Genre: Sketch comedy
- Created by: Nick Kroll; Jonathan Krisel; John Levenstein
- Directed by: Jonathan Krisel
- Starring: Nick Kroll
- Country of origin: United States
- Original language: English
- No. of seasons: 3
- No. of episodes: 30

Production
- Executive producers: Nick Kroll; John Levenstein; Jonathan Krisel; Jim Sharp; Monika Zielinska
- Camera setup: Single
- Running time: 21 minutes
- Production companies: Good at Bizness, Inc. Salt in Wound

Original release
- Network: Comedy Central
- Release: January 16, 2013 – March 24, 2015

Kroll Show is an American sketch comedy television series created by and starring comedian Nick Kroll. John Levenstein and Jonathan Krisel served as the show's executive producers. The series aired on the American cable television network Comedy Central from January 16, 2013, to March 24, 2015.

== Style ==
Kroll Show is a social satire that parodies many aspects of television, the internet, and popular culture. The opening title credits of each episode feature multiple iterations of the show's title as parodies of well-known TV series title cards, brand names, corporate logos, and real-world locations, among them Absolut Vodka, Breaking Bad, Google, In-N-Out Burger, NASCAR and Game of Thrones. The style of the series is heavily influenced by the reality television genre, although it differs in style and content from other "mockumentary"-style series like The Office. Most sketches are written, performed, recorded, and edited to mimic the frenetic pace and melodramatic style of reality TV shows like Duck Dynasty, The Osbournes, and Keeping Up with the Kardashians, with multiple hand-held cameras, rapid editing, flashbacks, cutaway commentaries, and superimposed graphics and text. Each episode is constructed to simulate the effect of "channel surfing" across a range of reality TV shows on cable TV. An exception to the prevailing style of the series is the recurring sketch "Wheels, Ontario", which parodies earnest issues-based teen dramas such as Degrassi Junior High.

Most sketches in the series feature Nick Kroll, who plays multiple characters including dysfunctional teenage dad C-Czar, aspiring entrepreneur and "ghost-bouncer" Bobby Bottleservice, inept publicity agent Liz G. (co-founder of Hollywood PR firm "PubLIZity Public Relations"), California’s premier animal plastic surgeon Dr. Armond, aging prankster Gil Faizon ("Too Much Tuna", "Oh, Hello"), nouveau riche party boy Aspen Bruckenheimer ("Rich Dicks"), Philadelphia-based pawn shop owner Murph ("Pawnsylvania"), and Canadian teen actor/musician Bryan La Croix ("Wheels, Ontario").

Kroll Show completed its third and final season in 2015. Kroll said the decision to end the show was his, and that the show's stories and characters were naturally wrapping up in the third season.

== Cast ==
- Nick Kroll as various characters.

=== Recurring ===
- Jon Daly as various characters including Peter Paparazzo ("Ghost Bouncers"), Wendy Shawn ("Rich Dicks"), Coach Teacher/Gene Creemers ("Wheels, Ontario"), Don ("Pawnsylvania"), Kelsey Grammer ("Chairs")
- Jenny Slate as Liz B. and Denise B. ("PubLIZity"), Ruth Diamond Phillips ("Armond of the House"), Maureen ("Chairs")
- John Mulaney as George St. Geegland ("Too Much Tuna”, “Oh, Hello”)
- Jason Mantzoukas as various characters including Eagle Wing ("Gigolo House"), Spit Decreaux ("Nash Rickey's Rock N' Reunion")
- Seth Morris as various characters including Renick ("Pony Tales"), Bob Ducca
- Chelsea Peretti as Farley ("Bobby Bottleservice and Peter Paparazzo", "Gigolo House")
- Samantha Futerman as Tunes ("Wheels, Ontario")
- Andy Milonakis as Dr. Armond’s son, Roman ("Armond of the House", "Roman's Empire")
- Ron Funches as public defense attorney ("Bounce", "Mercury Poisoning"), therapist in training ("The In Addition Tos")
- Bill Burr as Detective Smart ("Armond of the House")
- Kathryn Hahn as Mikey's mom ("Wheels, Ontario")
- Steve Dildarian as Tim/Steve ("Gigolo House")
- Tonita Castro as Consuela ("Rich Dicks", "El Chupacabra")
- Sarah Dampf as Cassandra (“PubLIZity”)

Guest appearances have included: Nathan Fillion, Zach Galifianakis, Brody Stevens, Amy Poehler, Laura Dern, Will Forte, Jordan Peele, Bruce McCulloch, Brie Larson, Fred Armisen, Andrew Daly, J. B. Smoove, Hannibal Buress, Pete Holmes, Ike Barinholtz, Rance Howard, Tim Heidecker, Ed Helms, Maria Bamford, Brian Stack, Nathan Fielder, Richard Kind, Brian Huskey, Dave Holmes, Rob Huebel, Joe Mande, Adam Pally, June Diane Raphael, Paul Scheer, Casey Wilson, Jane Levy, Marc Evan Jackson, Katy Perry, Makayla Lysiak, Jon Heder, Henry Rollins, Seth Rogen, and James Franco.

== Legacy ==
Some Kroll Show characters directly influenced characters on Kroll's hit Netflix animated series Big Mouth in voice, personality and sometimes appearance. Among others, washed-up 1980s hair-metal vocalist Nash Rickey inspired Maury the Hormone Monster; PubLIZity co-owner Liz B.'s meek niece Denise became nerdy Missy Foreman-Greenwald; and Liz B.'s business partner Liz G. resembles shallow, insecure Lola Skumpy. Many Kroll Show performers voice characters on Big Mouth, including Kroll himself, Mulaney, Slate and Mantzoukas.

== Episodes ==
=== Series overview ===
Season	Episodes	Originally aired	
Season	Episodes	First aired	Last aired
1	8	January 16, 2013	March 6, 2013
2	11	January 14, 2014	March 25, 2014
3	11	January 13, 2015	March 24, 2015

=== Season 1 (2013) ===
No. overall	No. in season	Title	Original release date	US viewers (millions)
1	1	"San Diego Diet"	January 16, 2013	1.18
Sketches include: “Nick’s Mix”; “PubLIZity (Canine Cancer Institute benefit)”; “Sex in the City for Dudes”; “Ref Jeff - Overheard on the Court”; “The San Diego Diet”; and “Wheels, Ontario”
2	2	"Soaked in Success"	January 23, 2013	1.04
Sketches include: “Chikk Klub”; “Rich Dicks (Tijuana)”; “Chikk Klub Presents Soaked in Success”; “Armond of the House”; and “Bobby Bottleservice (Farley video chat)”
3	3	"Secret Room"	January 30, 2013	0.83
Sketches include: “Dinner Table”; “Ghost Bouncers”; “Screws”; “The Adventures of Young Billy Joel”; “Visiting Europe”; “Nash Rickey's time-out concert”; and “Beats & Rice”
4	4	"Too Much Tuna"	February 6, 2013	0.82
Sketches include: “Composite Viewer Prototype”; “Rich Dicks (Gallons)”; “Super Deluxe Fun Loan”; “PubLIZity (Cultured Yogurt Water launch party)”; “El Chupacabra (cheating boyfriend)”; “Digital Money”; “Too Much Tuna (Dr. Jeffrey Gurian, D.D.S.)”; and “Make Money, Fast and Easy”
5	5	"Can I Finish?"	February 13, 2013	0.70
Sketches include: "Drones"; "Fabrice Fabrice"; "Pony Tales”; “Can I Finish?"; "Armond About Town”; and "Electricity"
6	6	"Dine & Dash"	February 20, 2013	0.79
Sketches include: “Post Grad”; “Dine & Dash”; “Roman’s Empire”; “Vargas-Ballasteros Countdown”; “Oh, Hello (basketball)”; and “C-Czar’s Palace”
7	7	"Ice Dating"	February 27, 2013	0.71
Sketches include: “Advertising”; “Ice Dating”; “Oh, Hello (party)”; “Rich Dicks” (driving)”; “El Chupacabra (suicidal rock star)”; and “Ref Jeff - Locked In”
8	8	"Please God"	March 6, 2013	0.93
Sketches include: “Please God”; “Bobby Bottleservice Full Service Wedding Service”; "PubLIZity (Liz G.’s wedding)"; "Too Much Tuna (Elon Faizon)”; "Barking Up the Right Tree"; and “Ref Jeff - Happy Birthday, Bella!”

=== Season 2 (2014) ===
No. overall	No. in season	Title	Original release date	US viewers (millions)
9	1	"Cake Train"	January 14, 2014	0.76
Sketches include: “Cake Train”; “Dad Academy (Making Good Choices Under Pressure)”; “PubLIZity (Liz B.’s pregnancy)”; and “Too Much Tuna (Violet from Great Britain)”
10	2	"#canadiansafesex"	January 21, 2014	0.66
Sketches include: “Show Us Your Songs Toronto”; “Wheels Ontario (‘Not a Regular Day’)”; “Hippie Fights”; “Very Much Reluctant Gigolos”; “Ask Bryan”; and “ntr 2 win”
11	3	"Oh Armond"	January 28, 2014	0.84
Sketches include: “Rocks & Roll”; “Armond of the House Arrest”; and “Rich Dicks (eulogy)”
12	4	"Sponsored by Stamps"	February 4, 2014	0.82
Sketches include: “Ref Jeff - Making Friends”; “Nash Rickey’s Rock N’ Reunion”; “Wheels, Ontario (‘An Interesting Visit’)”; and “Ref Jeff - Overheard College!”
13	5	"Krolling Around With Nick Clown"	February 11, 2014	0.84
Sketches include: “Del Ray Deli”; “Ref Jeff - Signing Bonus”; “Madison Chooses...”; “Get Out!”; “TSA Agent Jeff”; and “A Guide to America”
14	6	"Mother Daughter Sister Wife"	February 18, 2014	0.97
Sketches include: “Gigolo House (Freaky Friday Date Night USA)”; “Oh, Hello (Mother Daughter Sister Wife)”; “Dad Academy (Not Abandoning Your Baby)”; and “Live Letter”
15	7	"Finger Magnets"	February 25, 2014	1.10
Sketches include: “The San Diego Mindset”; “Rich Dicks (finger magnets)”; “PubLIZity (new assistant)”; “The Legend of Young Larry Bird”; and “Fat Dad Dirty House: The Curse of Cassandra”
16	8	"Mercury Poisoning"	March 4, 2014	N/A
Sketches include: “Rich Dicks (flight to Dubai)”; “Dad Academy (Driving Sober)”; “Pawnsylvania (shop swap)”; “Too Much Tuna (prank show)”; “Ronald Funches, Public Defender”; and “Oh, Hello (mercury poisoning)”
17	9	"Bounce"	March 11, 2014	0.78
Sketches include: “Can I Finish?”; “Dad Academy (Sort Of Coming to Terms with My Dad)”; “First to Judgement with Dana Hawke”; “The Ballad of Bobby B”; and “Armand Trial: Uncensored as F***!”
18	10	"Banff Is on Fire"	March 18, 2014	1.10
Sketches include: “Cheatin’”; “Wheels, Ontario (‘Over My Dead Body’)”; “House of Armond”; “Show Us Your Songs Toronto finals”; and “Too Much Love”
19	11	"Blisteritos Presents Dad Academy Graduation Congraduritos Red Carpet Viewing Party"	March 25, 2014	0.84
Sketches include: “Blisteritos”; “PubLIZity (Congraduritos Red Carpet Viewing Party)”; “Dad Academy Graduation Special”; “Rich Dicks (party)”; and “Dad Academy After Dark”

=== Season 3 (2015) ===
No. overall	No. in season	Title	Original release date	US viewers (millions)
20	1	"Gigolo H-O-R-S-E"	January 13, 2015	0.431
Sketches include: "Gigolo House," "Wheels, Ontario," "Dead Girl Town"
21	2	"Pleep Ploop"	January 20, 2015	N/A
Sketches include: "Oh, Hello," "Loser's Bracket," "Show Us Your Songs Commonwealth: In Praise of the Crown"
22	3	"Bangs"	January 27, 2015	N/A
Sketches include: "Rich Dicks," "Publizity," "Too Much Tuna," "Gold Diggers," "Hunt or Gather"
23	4	"Karaoke Bullies"	February 3, 2015	0.526
Sketches include: "Pawnsylvania," "Chairs"
24	5	"The In Addition Tos"	February 10, 2015	0.566
Sketches include: "Toilet Dad," "Hoffman Twins," "Wheels, Ontario"
25	6	"Lizards vs. Penguins"	February 17, 2015	0.537
Sketches include: "Truthlings: What On Earth Will We Do?," "Publizity," "Crab Cab," "The Realists"
26	7	"Twins"	February 24, 2015	0.540
Sketches include: "Señor Feeture," "Wheels, Ontario," "Look Like Dis," "Chairs"
27	8	"The Commonwealth Games"	March 3, 2015	0.549
Sketches include: "Pawnsylvania," "Show Us Your Songs Commonwealth: In Praise of the Crown," "Manchine"
28	9	"Body Bouncers"	March 10, 2015	0.414
Sketches include: "Rich Dicks," "Laws of Attraction"
29	10	"The Time of My Life"	March 17, 2015	0.410
Sketches include: "Armond The World", "Show Us Your Songs Commonwealth: In Praise of the Crown," "Toilet Dad," "The European Guide to Cannibalism"
30	11	"This Has Been Such an Amazing Experience"	March 24, 2015	0.445
Sketches include: "Publizity," "Dead Girl Town," "Rich Dicks," "Armond is Everywhere"
