= Little Manhattan =

2005 US romantic comedy film by Mark Levin

- Theatrical release poster
- Directed by: Mark Levin (Note: Though Levin is credited as the sole director and Flackett as the writer, they assert on the DVD commentary that they shared writing and direction duties.)
- Written by: Jennifer Flackett
- Produced by: Gavin Polone; Arnon Milchan
- Starring: Josh Hutcherson; Bradley Whitford; Cynthia Nixon; Charlie Ray
- Cinematography: Tim Orr
- Edited by: Alan Edward Bell
- Music by: Chad Fischer
- Production companies: Regency Enterprises; Pariah Films
- Distributed by: 20th Century Fox
- Release date: September 30, 2005
- Running time: 90 minutes
- Country: United States
- Language: English
- Box office: $1.1 million

Little Manhattan is a 2005 American romantic comedy-drama film directed by Mark Levin and written by Jennifer Flackett. Josh Hutcherson and Charlotte Ray Rosenberg star. It is set in Manhattan and is about a preteen boy as he experiences his first love.

The film was released by 20th Century Fox on September 30, 2005 to positive reviews from critics and grossed $1.1 million worldwide.

== Plot ==
Gabriel "Gabe" Burton, an adventurous 10 3/4-year-old boy, lives in Manhattan with his parents, Leslie and Adam, who are on the verge of divorcing. Gabe spends most of his free time exploring the city on his scooter. Gabe's daily exploits are noticed and encouraged by the friendly concierge at his building. Eventually, Gabe runs across Rosemary Telesco, an 11-year-old classmate whom he has known since kindergarten, in a karate class. After being partnered with her for sparring, Gabe suddenly notices her as a girl rather than another face in school (even if she is the "third prettiest girl at school" to him). He is elated when they hang out together and is completely enamored with not only Rosemary, but her daily life. Rosemary lives with her loving upper-class parents and adoptive younger sister from China on the edge of Central Park. One day, Gabe takes Rosemary on a tour through Central Park, and another day, they venture across the city to Septuagesimo Uno, Manhattan's smallest park while finding an apartment for rent (for Adam who inevitably will be moving out). Gabe's nervous parents are worried.

Rosemary's family's life is in contrast to Gabe's since Leslie and Adam have declared an awkward truce while waiting for their divorce to be official. As their relationship progresses, Gabe begins to question what is happening to him and why he is falling in love with Rosemary. Complicating matters, Rosemary is going to summer camp for six weeks and her parents will enroll her in a private school afterwards.

Things seem to be going perfectly (too well even), but Gabe's world is turned upside down when he and Rosemary are assigned new sparring partners in karate. Gabe is jealous of Rosemary's new partner, Tim Staples, a tall blonde boy who is much better at self-defense than him. Eventually, Rosemary's parents take them to hear a jazz pianist and singer at The Carlyle, where Rosemary and Gabe finally hold hands. After the show, Rosemary's parents tell them to say good night, and her parents go to buy milk. After they walk off, Gabe and Rosemary talk, but he interrupts her by kissing her. With time quickly running out, Gabe tries to get closer to Rosemary, but only manages to drive her away. In a desperate move to win Rosemary back, Gabe attempts to show off and earn his yellow belt, but painfully fractures his hand attempting to break a board (he was just about to pass the test).

Adam eventually tells Gabe that his marriage with Leslie fell apart because of things they left unsaid. After an argument on the phone on the night he got injured, Gabe goes to find Rosemary at her aunt's wedding reception and declares his love. Taken aback, Rosemary tells him that she does not think she is ready for love, but she is really happy to see Gabe and asks him to dance. As they dance, Gabe muses that he and Rosemary were on different paths—"like two ships that passed in Sheep Meadow (in Central Park)". Gabe returns home and his parents are laughing while reminiscing about their honeymoon. Gabe is pleased and surprised when Adam says he "cleared out some old stuff" and his parents have reconciled. The three happily go out to dinner, and as the movie ends, Gabe summarizes what Rosemary meant to him: "I'm never gonna get another first love. That one's always gonna be her."

== Cast ==
- Josh Hutcherson as Gabriel "Gabe" Burton, the protagonist who falls in love with Rosemary Telesco
- Charlotte Ray Rosenberg (credited as Charlie Ray) as Rosemary Telesco, Gabe's love interest
- Bradley Whitford as Adam Burton, Gabe's father
- Cynthia Nixon as Leslie Burton, Gabe's mother
- John Dossett as Mickey Telesco, Rosemary's father
- Talia Balsam as Jackie Telesco, Rosemary's mother
- Willie Garson as Ralph, the elevator man at Gabe's apartment who is nice to him
- Tonye Patano as Birdie, Rosemary's nanny
- Leigha and Juliette Nicoloro as Mae-Li, Rosemary's three-year-old adoptive sister
- Josh Pais as Ronny, Leslie's new date
- Michael Bush as Max, a boy who is one of Gabe's friends
- Jonah Meyerson as Sam, a boy who is also one of Gabe's friends
- Brian W. Aguiar as Jacob, a boy who is also another of Gabe's friends
- Connor Hutcherson (Josh Hutcherson's younger brother) as the boy who throws up
- Anthony Laflamme as Tim Staples, Rosemary's new karate partner and Gabe's rival
- Mike Chat as himself, Gabe's karate hero
- J. Kyle Manzay as Master Coles, the karate teacher from Gabe and Rosemary's karate class
- Nick Cubbler as Daryl Kitzens, the bully who is beat by Gabe and Rosemary
- Neil Jay Shastri as David Betanahu, Gabe's new karate partner

== Production ==
The original idea for the film was just one sentence in a long list of ideas. Mark Levin and Jennifer Flackett wanted to make a film as director. An adolescent love story had the added benefit of not being a project led by a star actor. They believed they could make it for a reasonable budget. From concept to completed script, it took about two months and the film was greenlit soon afterwards.

== Reception ==
=== Critical response ===
Little Manhattan received mostly positive reviews from film critics. On Rotten Tomatoes it has an approval rating of 77% based on reviews from 31 critics. The site's consensus says, "Little Manhattan is a sweet story of young love that provides an enlightening if pragmatic view on love and courtship." Metacritic gave it a score of 52 based on 10 reviews, indicating "mixed or average" reviews.

BBC's Stella Papamichael wrote that the film was "sweet but not syrupy and heart-warming without being manipulative, this kid flick stands tall among recent Hollywood love stories". Kevin Thomas, writing for the Los Angeles Times, called the film "a handsome charmer about the avalanche of first love... an endearing, affectionately humorous and even lyrical depiction of the dawning of adolescence amid the privileged". Thomas felt the script was "problematic...[Gabe's] speech as soundtrack narrator of his own story is precociously improbable". Jeffrey Lyons of NBC called Little Manhattan "one of the sweetest, most touching films you'll see". Variety's Brian Lowry was less positive about the film, "Resting almost entirely on the shoulders of its young leads, both they and the pic lack the sparkle to sustain what seeks to be a whimsical premise but, except for a few moments, proves ponderous instead." He believed the film belonged on "youth-targeting basic-cable networks" instead of being in cinemas.

=== Box office ===
The film made $36,397 in the opening weekend in the United States and by December 18, 2005, it had grossed $385,373. Its worldwide box office gross was $1,117,920.

== Music ==
The film's score was composed by Chad Fischer, the guitarist and lead singer of Lazlo Bane. The movie featured 18 other songs, half are covers by a variety of musicians, from the well-known The Beatles and Elvis Presley to little-known The Meadows and Loston Harris (the jazz pianist in the film). Chad Fischer contributed several songs to the film both as a performer and producer.

The soundtrack album for the film was not released and half of the songs used are exclusive to the film.

=== Track listing ===
No.	Title	Writer(s)	Artist(s)	Length
1.	"Only the Strong Survive^{[A]}"	Jerry Butler	Elvis Presley	2:42
2.	"Birdland"	Ron Aspery	Ron Aspery
3.	"When the Saints Go Marching In^{[C]}"	Traditional	The All Star Marching Band
4.	"Kung Fu Fighting (Adrian Sherwood On-U-Remix)^{[A]}"	Carl Douglas	Carl Douglas	4:41
5.	"Sleepless in Brooklyn"	Chad Fischer, Timothy Bright and Chris Link	Lazlo Bane
6.	"Younger Yesterday^{[A]}"	Todd Herfindal and Kevin Houlihan	The Meadows	3:15
7.	"New Fast^{[A]}"	Jeff Gramm	Aden	2:27
8.	"Miserable Life"	Chad Fischer and Lyle Workman	Chad Fischer and Lyle Workman
9.	"Burning Flame^{[C]}"	Richard Friedman	Richard Friedman
10.	"Teach Me Tonight^{[C]}"	Sammy Cahn and Gene de Paul	Loston Harris
11.	"Map of My Heart^{[B]}"	Chad Fischer	Chad Fischer	3:24
12.	"Lonely Road^{[A]}"	Erik Schrody	Everlast	3:18
13.	"Polly Wolly Doodle^{[C]}"	Traditional	Susannah Blinkoff
14.	"The Very Thought of You^{[A]}"	Ray Noble	Nat King Cole	3:48
15.	"Love^{[A]}"	Matt White and Paul Umbach	Matt White	2:50
16.	"At Last^{[A]}"	Mack Gordon and Harry Warren	Etta James	3:02
17.	"Love Grows (Where My Rosemary Goes)^{[C]}"	Barry Mason and Tony Macaulay	Freedy Johnston
18.	"In My Life^{[C]}"	John Lennon and Paul McCartney	Matt Scannell

- A Available on other releases
- B Available to listen on Chad Fischer's Myspace page
- C Available by original and/or other musicians
