= Andrew Goldberg (writer) =

American writer

- Born: White Plains, New York, U.S.
- Education: Columbia University (BA); UCLA School of Theater, Film and Television (MFA)
- Occupations: Television writer, producer
- Notable work: Big Mouth and Family Guy
- Children: 2

Andrew Goldberg is an American writer and producer.

Goldberg co-created the Netflix adult animated series Big Mouth with his childhood best friend Nick Kroll, and Mark Levin and Jennifer Flackett, and serves as a writer and executive producer. Prior to that, he wrote for Family Guy. He is also the author of Family Guy: Brian's Guide to Booze, Broads, and the Lost Art of Being a Man, a book published by HarperCollins focusing on Brian Griffin's beliefs.

Goldberg was born and raised in White Plains, New York and is of Jewish descent. He earned his BA at Columbia University in 2000 and his MFA at the UCLA School of Film & Television in 2002.

== Filmography ==
Year	Title	Role
2008–2016	Family Guy	Writer, staff writer, story editor, supervising producer & co-executive producer
2017–2025	Big Mouth	Co-creator, executive producer & writer
2022–2023	Human Resources	Co-creator, executive producer & writer
2026	Mating Season	Co-creator, executive producer & writer
