= The Adam Project =

2022 American film by Shawn Levy

- Official release poster
- Directed by: Shawn Levy
- Written by: Jonathan Tropper; T. S. Nowlin; Jennifer Flackett; Mark Levin
- Produced by: David Ellison; Dana Goldberg; Don Granger; Shawn Levy; Ryan Reynolds
- Starring: Ryan Reynolds; Mark Ruffalo; Jennifer Garner; Walker Scobell; Catherine Keener; Zoe Saldaña
- Cinematography: Tobias Schliessler
- Edited by: Dean Zimmerman; Jonathan Corn
- Music by: Rob Simonsen
- Production companies: Skydance; 21 Laps Entertainment; Maximum Effort
- Distributed by: Netflix
- Release dates: March 9, 2022 (limited theatrical); March 11, 2022 (worldwide)
- Running time: 106 minutes
- Country: United States
- Language: English
- Budget: $116 million

The Adam Project is a 2022 American science fiction action comedy film directed by Shawn Levy and written by Jonathan Tropper, T. S. Nowlin, Jennifer Flackett, and Mark Levin. The film stars Ryan Reynolds, Walker Scobell in his film debut, Mark Ruffalo, Jennifer Garner, Catherine Keener, and Zoe Saldaña. Reynolds plays the title character, a fighter pilot who steals a time jet and lands in 2022, encountering his 12-year-old self (Scobell), who had been dealing with the loss of his father (Ruffalo) the year before, and must work together to prevent the assassination of his wife (Saldaña) and stop the leader from his timeline (Keener) from monopolizing time travel.

Production on the film first began in 2012 with Tom Cruise attached to star. The film then fell into development hell until Netflix acquired the distribution rights. Filming commenced in November 2020 and wrapped in March 2021. Rob Simonsen composed the score.

The Adam Project began a limited "one night only" theatrical release on March 9, 2022, followed by its streaming release on March 11. The film received generally positive reviews from critics, who praised the performances, action sequences, visual effects, and its inspiration from 1980s movies. The film ranks as the third most popular movie on Netflix worldwide, accumulating 157.6 million views in its first 28 days.

== Plot ==
In a dystopian 2050, fighter pilot Adam Reed steals a time jet to escape to 2018 to save his wife, Laura, from assassination. During his escape, he is injured and crash-lands in 2022, where he encounters his 12-year-old self, who has been suspended after being bullied in school and is distant from his mother Ellie after the death of his father Louis Reed the previous year.

At first, Young Adam distrusts his future self but realizes he's telling the truth when 2050 Adam mentions his life and knows his dog. 2050 Adam decides to bring his younger self along to find Laura in 2018 once his injuries are healed. Both Adams are soon attacked by Maya Sorian, the leader of the dystopian world, and her assistant Christos. However, they are saved by Laura, who has faked her death and stayed off-grid in an unknown location, via a gun and the plasmic MAG/CYL.

After briefly losing the pursuers, Laura and the Adams realize that after the invention of time travel by Louis and his subsequent death, Sorian has monopolized the discovery. They find Sorian frequently came and advised her 2018 self to secure her future wealth and power. Laura's hideout is discovered by Christos. Laura holds them off while the two Adams escape, sacrificing herself as she is vaporized by Sorian.

The Adams escape into 2018, where they visit Louis Reed and attempt to enlist his help, but he refuses out of concern for the effects on the time stream. Meanwhile, the 2050 Sorian warns her 2018 self about Adam.

The following day, the two Adams set off to destroy the particle accelerator located underground at Sorian Technologies. They come under attack by Sorian's soldiers waiting for them but are saved by Louis, who has changed his mind and agrees to guide them. He reveals that destroying the machine will not destroy time travel as long as Sorian has his algorithm with the math and constraints to control the process, so decides to destroy the memory unit instead.

Meanwhile, 2050 Sorian captures the younger Adam and holds him hostage as Louis and 2050 Adam remove an algorithm memory unit. 2050 Adam distracts Sorian and Christos enough for younger Adam to free himself, resulting in damage to the electromagnetic seal around the accelerator, which tears the facility apart.

The Reeds manage to take out Christos after a lengthy fight, but the older Sorian threatens to kill Louis, who remains adamant and refuses to hand over the memory unit. She shoots at Louis. However, the path of the armor-piercing bullet is altered by the electromagnetic field and hits 2018 Sorian instead, killing her and hence wiping 2050 Sorian out of existence.

The Reeds barely manage to escape the facility's implosion and return home, where they reconcile by playing a game of catch before the Adams fade out and return to their respective time periods. In 2022, the younger Adam has not been suspended, has let go of his anger, and hugs his mother.

Sometime in the future, an older and much happier Adam meets Laura during a flight training lecture where she realizes, to Adam's amusement, that she has entered the wrong building on the campus. Adam offers to walk her to her building, stating that he has time, and they depart together.

== Cast ==
- Ryan Reynolds as Adam Reed (2050), a time pilot who risks his life to try and uncover the truth behind his wife's disappearance.
  - Walker Scobell as 12-year-old Adam (2022), a bullied, asthmatic sixth grader suffering from depression due to his father dying from a car accident. Levy Reynolds, their team of producers and casting director Carmen Cuba had auditioned hundreds of young actors before eventually landing on Scobell for his acting debut.
  - Isaiah Haegert as 8-year-old Adam (2018).
- Mark Ruffalo as Louis Reed, Adam's father and a brilliant quantum physicist who wrote the algorithm necessary for controlled time travel. Reed died in 2021 in a car accident, and Adam still has depression.
- Jennifer Garner as Ellie Reed, Adam's mother. Garner also portrays her younger self in 2018.
- Catherine Keener as Maya Sorian, a businesswoman who funded Louis' research and later took advantage of his death to monopolize it for her own benefit and create a future where she is the most powerful woman in the world.
  - Keener also portrays her younger self through de-aging, with Lucie Guest as her body double.
- Zoe Saldaña as Laura Shane, Adam's wife and a fellow time pilot left stranded in 2018 after a failed attempt on her life. Saldaña also portrays her alternate version in the changed timeline.
- Alex Mallari Jr. as Christos, Adam and Laura's former colleague, now a ruthless security enforcer employed by Sorian.
- Ben Wilkinson as Derek, Ellie's new boyfriend with a "mouth mullet", as Adam calls it.

== Production ==
=== Development ===
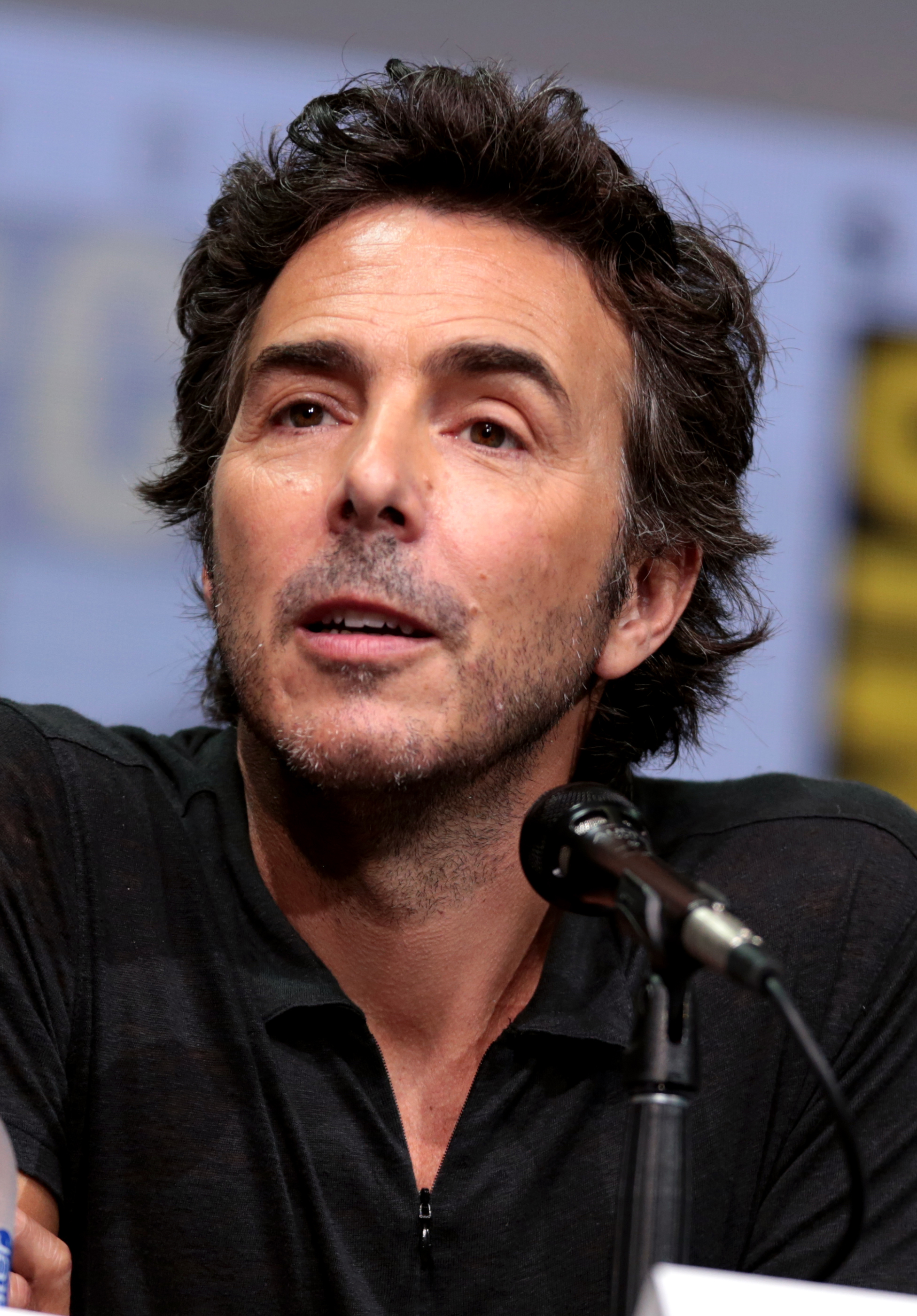
Shawn Levy was confirmed to be the director of the film after Netflix revived the film in July 2020.

The project, a spec script written by T. S. Nowlin, was initially announced as Our Name Is Adam in October 2012. Paramount Pictures became interested in acquiring the film, and Tom Cruise was attached to star.

After remaining in development hell for several years, the film was revived in July 2020 when it was acquired by Netflix, with Shawn Levy as director and Ryan Reynolds set to star after previously collaborating on Free Guy (2021), while the latest draft of the script was written by Jonathan Tropper, from previous drafts by Nowlin, Jennifer Flackett and Mark Levin. In November, Jennifer Garner, Zoe Saldaña, Mark Ruffalo, Catherine Keener, Alex Mallari Jr. and Walker Scobell were added to the cast.

=== Filming ===
Filming commenced in November 2020 in Vancouver, British Columbia, Canada. Filming officially wrapped in March 2021.

=== Visual effects ===
Scanline VFX, DNEG, Lola Visual Effects, Rebels, and Supervixen provided the visual effects for the film. Digital Domain and Proof provided visualization services.

=== Music ===
The Adam Project (Soundtrack from the Netflix Film)

Soundtrack album by Rob Simonsen
- Released: March 11, 2022
- Genre: Film score
- Length: 59:56
- Label: Milan
- Producers: Rob Simonsen; Taylor Lipari-Hassett

Singles from The Adam Project (Soundtrack from the Netflix Film)
- 1. "The Adam Project" Released: March 3, 2022

Rob Simonsen composed the score. A track from the film titled "The Adam Project" was released as a single on March 3, 2022. The soundtrack was released by Milan Records on March 11, 2022.

==== Track listing ====
No.	Title	Length
1.	"The Adam Project"	4:55
2.	"Hallway"	0:38
3.	"Make Good Choices"	2:09
4.	"Forest"	2:55
5.	"Hawking, Zip It"	4:42
6.	"Plan A"	1:53
7.	"You Can Be a Real Jerk"	1:21
8.	"Who's This?"	1:49
9.	"Tell Him"	1:45
10.	"Find Him"	0:40
11.	"Ouchie with the Face"	3:06
12.	"Look Up"	2:54
13.	"I Found You"	2:38
14.	"Echo of This One"	2:01
15.	"They Found Us"	2:46
16.	"Plan"	2:10
17.	"Laura"	1:07
18.	"Punch That Sh*t"	1:59
19.	"Is This Time Travel?"	1:59
20.	"He Doesn't Need Perfect"	1:24
21.	"Butternut Sippy Cup"	3:52
22.	"Take Your Son to Work Day"	1:33
23.	"Supper Time, Spanky"	1:11
24.	"You Never Understood the Science"	2:36
25.	"Catch"	4:27
26.	"I Found You Again"	1:42
Total length:		59:56

== Release ==
The film began a limited theatrical release only on March 9, 2022, at 7:00PM Eastern Standard Time followed by its release on Netflix on March 11.

== Reception ==
=== Audience viewership ===
According to Samba TV, 3 million US households watched The Adam Project in its first weekend streaming on Netflix. Samba TV also showed that 384,000 households watched the film within the first 3-days of that period. The film ranks as the fifth most popular movie on Netflix, with 157.6 million views.

=== Critical response ===
On the review aggregator website Rotten Tomatoes, 68% of 216 critics' reviews are positive, with an average rating of 6.2/10. The website's consensus reads: "Even if it isn't the most original – or memorable – time-travel adventure, The Adam Project gets by with entertaining action and a likable cast." Metacritic, which uses a weighted average, assigned the film a score of 55 out of 100, based on 48 critics, indicating "mixed or average" reviews.

Ryan Leston of IGN gave it 9 out of 10 and called it a mash-up of Back to the Future and The Last Starfighter. He praised Reynolds for his performance and Scobell for his debut performance. Owen Gleiberman of Variety wrote: "The movie is a total trifle, but it’s often a diverting one — a wide-eyed sci-fi adventure with a screwball buoyancy."

=== Accolades ===
Accolades received by The Adam Project
Award	Date of ceremony	Category	Recipient(s)	Result	Ref.
MTV Movie & TV Awards	June 5, 2022	Best Movie	The Adam Project	Nominated	
MTV Movie & TV Awards	June 5, 2022	Best Team	Ryan Reynolds and Walker Scobell	Nominated	
Dragon Awards	September 4, 2022	Best Science Fiction or Fantasy Movie	The Adam Project	Nominated	
People's Choice Awards	December 6, 2022	The Comedy Movie of 2022	The Adam Project	Won	
People's Choice Awards	December 6, 2022	The Male Movie Star of 2022	Ryan Reynolds	Nominated	
People's Choice Awards	December 6, 2022	The Female Movie Star of 2022	Jennifer Garner	Nominated	
People's Choice Awards	December 6, 2022	The Comedy Movie Star of 2022	Jennifer Garner	Nominated	
People's Choice Awards	December 6, 2022	The Comedy Movie Star of 2022	Ryan Reynolds	Nominated	
Nickelodeon Kids' Choice Awards	March 4, 2023	Favorite Movie Actor	Ryan Reynolds	Nominated	
