= Nick Kroll =

American actor and comedian (born 1978)

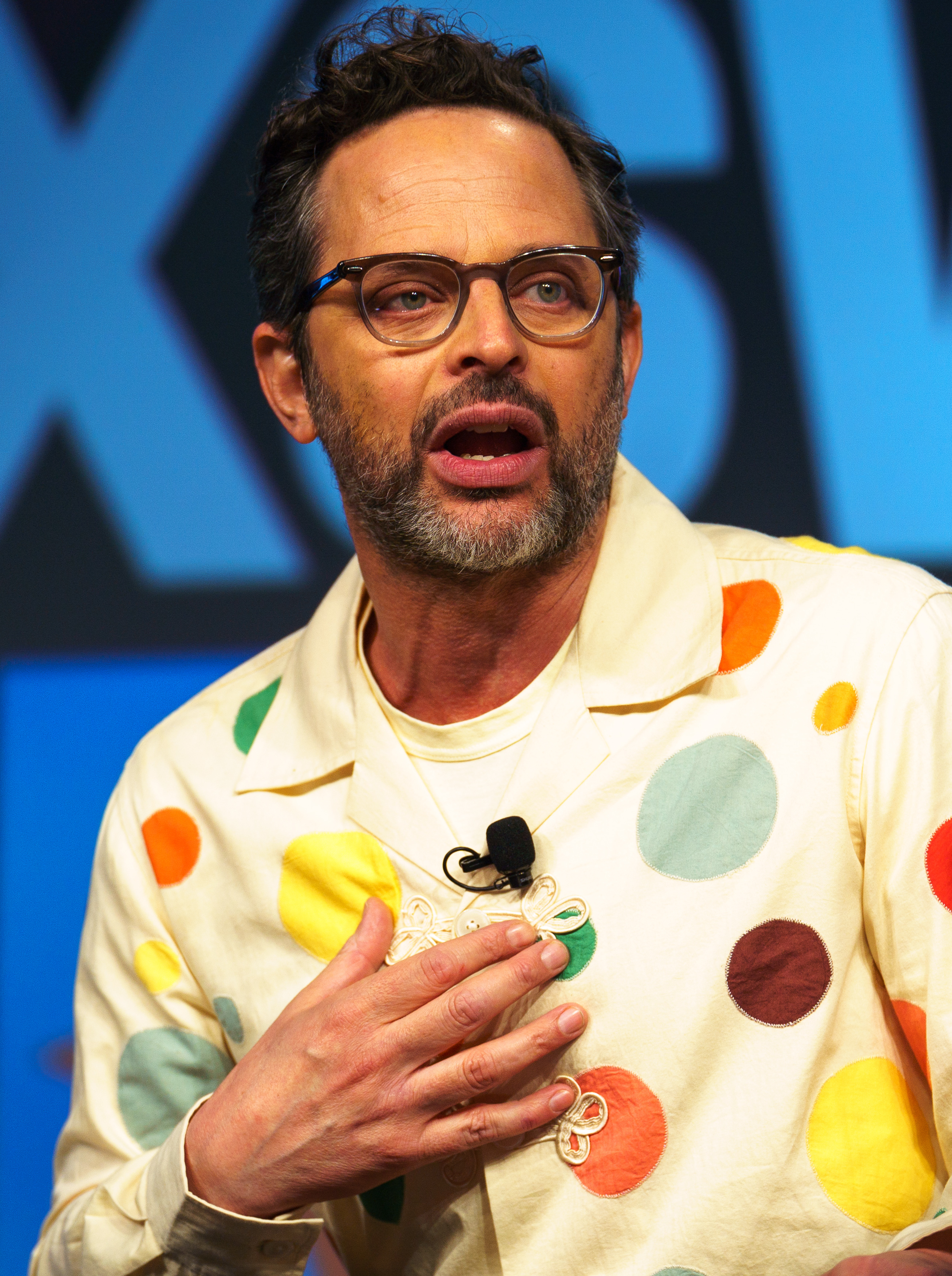
- Kroll in 2024
- Born: Nicholas Kroll; June 5, 1978 (age 48); Rye, New York, U.S.
- Education: Georgetown University (BA)
- Occupations: Actor; comedian; writer; producer
- Years active: 2004–present
- Spouse: Lily Kwong (m. 2020)
- Children: 2
- Father: Jules Kroll
- Relatives: Roger Bennett (brother-in-law); Joseph Altuzarra (cousin-in-law)
- Website: nickkroll.com

Nicholas Kroll (born June 5, 1978) is an American actor, comedian, writer, and producer. He is known for the FX comedy series The League (2009–2015); creating and starring in the Comedy Central series Kroll Show (2013–2015); and starring in and co-creating the animated Netflix series Big Mouth (2017–2025), Human Resources (2022–2023) and Mating Season (2026), as well as the Hulu sketch comedy series History of the World, Part II (2023).

He has acted or voice-acted in films such as I Love You, Man (2009), Get Him to the Greek (2010), Adult Beginners (2014), Vacation (2015), Sausage Party and Sing (both 2016), Captain Underpants: The First Epic Movie (2017), The House (2017), The Secret Life of Pets 2 (2019), Sing 2 and How It Ends (both 2021), The Bob's Burgers Movie (2022), First Time Female Director (2023), Red One (2024) and Smurfs (2025).

== Early life ==
Kroll was born in Rye, New York, on June 5, 1978, to Lynn and Jules Kroll. His father is a billionaire businessman who founded the corporate investigations and risk consulting firm Kroll Inc. The youngest child in the family, Kroll has a brother, Jeremy, and two sisters, Vanessa and Dana. He grew up in a Conservative Jewish family, and attended the Solomon Schechter School of Westchester. He went on to high school at Rye Country Day School. During this time, he briefly attended The Mountain School in Vershire, Vermont, where he developed a fondness for hiking. In 2001, Kroll graduated from Georgetown University. He described himself as a history major who minored in art and Spanish, but found himself "gravitating toward media studies as time went on."

== Career ==
Early in his career, Kroll contributed writing for Comedy Central's Chappelle's Show and MTV's Human Giant. In November and December 2008, he toured with Aziz Ansari on his Glow in the Dark comedy tour in the United States. Kroll's live work is a mix of standup, sketch and characters. In 2011, Comedy Central aired his stand-up special Thank You Very Cool. He has studied and performed regularly at the Upright Citizens Brigade Theater in New York City and Los Angeles and co-hosted the stand-up show Welcome to Our Week with Jessi Klein.

He has performed characters such as Bobby Bottleservice, who has been featured in a number of online videos for the website Funny or Die, including the Ed Hardy Boyz and an audition tape for the MTV show Jersey Shore. Other characters include Ref Jeff and Fabrice Fabrice, and Gil Faizon of The Oh, Hello Show, who he created with writing partner John Mulaney. His character work features prominently in Kroll Show, a sketch comedy show on Comedy Central. Kroll was honored with the Breakout Star of the Year award from the 2013 Just For Laughs festival.

=== The Oh, Hello Show ===
Kroll toured the U.S. alongside John Mulaney in The Oh, Hello Show, with both in character as Gil Faizon and George St. Geegland, respectively. The show premiered on Broadway on September 23, 2016, and ran for six months to positive reviews. The Broadway performance was filmed and released on Netflix in 2017.

=== Television ===
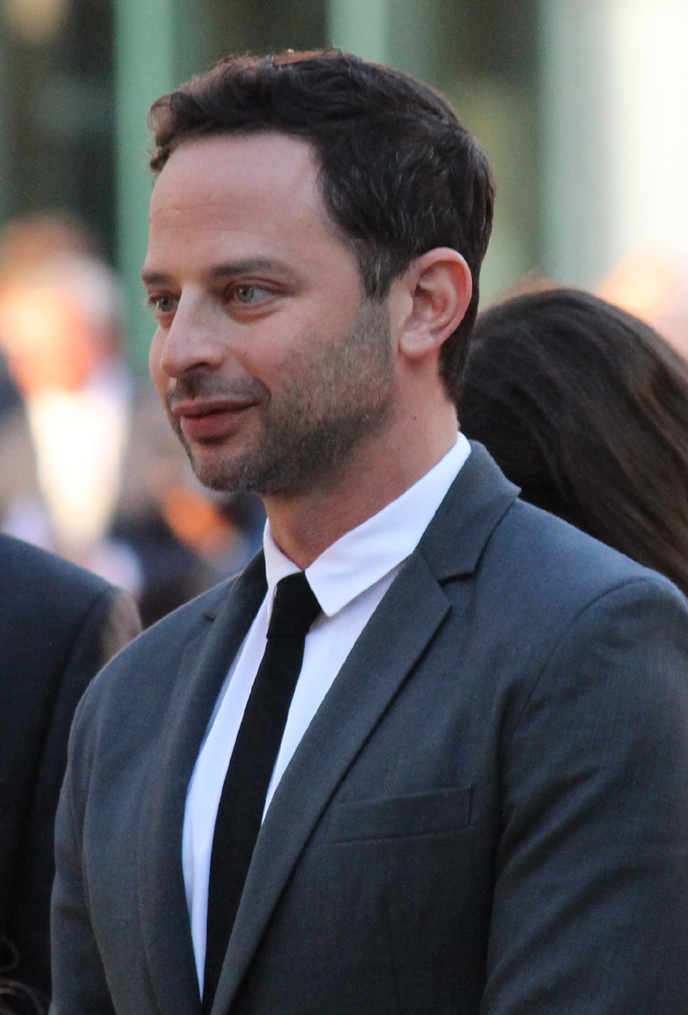
Kroll at the Toronto International Film Festival in 2016.

Kroll's first significant career success came when he co-starred in the ABC sitcom Cavemen, based on the Geico insurance TV commercial characters. Although the show was cancelled after seven episodes, he called his role "the most important experience of my professional career". He went on to VH1's Best Week Ever, and to guest-starring roles on Parks and Recreation, Community, Unbreakable Kimmy Schmidt, and New Girl. He made appearances on numerous Comedy Central series such as Reno 911!, John Oliver's New York Stand Up Show, and The Benson Interruption, both performing as himself and in character.

Kroll had a starring role as Rodney Ruxin in the FXX comedy series The League, which aired October 29, 2009, to December 9, 2015. Concurrently, he created and starred in his own Comedy Central sketch series, Kroll Show, which aired January 16, 2013, to March 24, 2015. Kroll had a recurring role on Childrens Hospital on Adult Swim. His voice work includes the character Stu on the HBO animated series The Life & Times of Tim, Andrew LeGustambos in the animated Fox comedy series Sit Down, Shut Up, and Reuben Grinder in the PBS Kids GO! series WordGirl. Kroll was one of the roasters on the Comedy Central Roast of James Franco.

In 2017, Kroll co-created, wrote, and starred in Big Mouth, an animated television show on Netflix. The show features the experiences of a group of 7th graders in the throes of puberty. Two of the main characters are based on, and named after, Kroll and his best friend from childhood, Andrew Goldberg. Kroll plays Nick, as well as Coach Steve, Maurice the Hormone Monster, Lola, Rick the Hormone Monster, the Jansen twins and Lady Liberty, in addition to several further minor and one-off characters. The show's success led its creators – Kroll, Andrew Goldberg, Mark Levin and Jennifer Flackett – to form the production company Brutus Pink, which works with Titmouse, Inc. to produce other shows for Netflix like the spin-off Human Resources, as well as the series Mating Season.

=== Film ===
Kroll starred in A Good Old Fashioned Orgy and had supporting roles in comedy films such as Sing, Dinner for Schmucks, Date Night, Get Him to the Greek, Adventures of Power, and I Love You Man.

In 2016, Kroll's first villain role was a vaginal douche in the adult animated film Sausage Party. Originally, he played Douche's voice in a British accent, but the team wanted to make a Pixar-like film instead of a Disney Renaissance-like film.

In 2017, Kroll then had a second villain voice role as a villainous mad scientist Professor Poopypants in the DreamWorks animated superhero film Captain Underpants: The First Epic Movie. Although many critics only either mentioned his character in passing, some pointing out his similarities with Albert Einstein, or his "committed" performance, Matt Zoller Seitz took particular note of his performance, praising it as "irrepressibly silly" with "an orange juice spit-take voice". Seitz further stated that "[t]he way Kroll savors every syllable of his alternately peevish, self-pitying and nonsensical dialogue—aided mightily by the animators, who've given the character a fireplug body and a waddling walk—transforms the ridiculous into the sublime." In recent years, Kroll has taken several non-comedic acting roles, such as that of Bernie Cohen in Loving and Rafi Eitan in Operation Finale, both historical drama films.

=== Book ===
In 2005, Kroll published a book, Bar Mitzvah Disco, cowritten with Jules Shell and Roger Bennett.

== Personal life ==
In May 2013, Kroll began dating comedian and actress Amy Poehler. They ended their relationship in 2015.

Kroll met landscape artist Lily Kwong in 2018. They married in November 2020 and their son was born in January 2021. In November 2023, they announced the birth of their daughter.

Kroll's brother-in-law is journalist Roger Bennett, who is married to Kroll's sister Vanessa. Through his wife, his cousin-in-law is fashion designer Joseph Altuzarra.

Before the 2020 United States elections, Kroll and other celebrities participated in the #IDCheck Challenge from VoteRiders to raise awareness about what identification voters need to cast a ballot in the election.

== Filmography ==
=== Film ===
Year	Title	Role	Notes
2008	The Negotiating Table	WGA employee	Short film
2008	Adventures of Power	Versatio Bakir	
2009	I Love You, Man	Larry	
2010	Date Night	The Maître D	
2010	Get Him to the Greek	Kevin McLean	
2010	Dinner for Schmucks	Josh	
2010	Little Fockers	Young Doctor	
2011	A Good Old Fashioned Orgy	Adam Richman	
2014	Adult Beginners	Jake Wenton	Also writer
2015	Vacation	Colorado Cop	
2015	Knight of Cups	Nick	
2016	Joshy	Eric	
2016	My Blind Brother	Bill	
2016	Sausage Party	Douche (voice)	
2016	Loving	Bernie Cohen	
2016	Sing	Gunter (voice)	
2017	Captain Underpants: The First Epic Movie	Professor Poopypants (voice)	
2017	The House	Bob Schaeffer	
2018	Uncle Drew	Mookie	
2018	Operation Finale	Rafi Eitan	
2019	Olympic Dreams	Ezra	Also writer and producer
2019	The Secret Life of Pets 2	Happy Sergei (voice)	
2019	The Addams Family	Uncle Fester (voice)	
2020	Have a Good Trip: Adventures in Psychedelics	Himself	Documentary
2021	How It Ends	Gary	
2021	The Addams Family 2	Uncle Fester (voice)	
2021	Sing 2	Gunter (voice)	
2022	The Bob's Burgers Movie	Scary Carnie (voice)	
2022	Don't Worry Darling	Dean	
2023	First Time Female Director	Clyde	
2024	I Don't Understand You	Dom	
2024	Sing: Thriller	Gunter (voice)	Short film
2024	Red One	Ted	
2025	Smurfs	Chernobog	
2026	Goat	Modo Olachenko (voice)	
2026	Roommates	Brian	

=== Television ===
Year	Title	Role	Notes
2006	CHTV	PSA Announcer	Episode 1: The Pilot
2006	Late Night with Conan O'Brien	Various	Episode: "2269"
2006	Cheap Seats without Ron Parker	Todd Lazarov	Episode: "NFL/MLB Arm Wrestling"
2006	Samurai Love God	(voice)	Miniseries
2007	Human Giant	Fabrice Fabrice, Various, Brolin DiBiasi	2 episodes
2007–2008	Cavemen	Nick Hedge	8 episodes
2008	Best Week Ever	Himself	Episode: "November 14, 2008"
2008–2009	Worst Week	Adam	6 episodes
2008–2011	Childrens Hospital	Nicky, Dr. Geza	6 episodes
2008–2012	The Life & Times of Tim	Stu (voice)	30 episodes
2009	The CollegeHumor Show	Chuck Paulson	Episode: "Rival Site"
2009	Reno 911!	El Chupacabra	3 episodes
2009	Mayne Street	Paparazzo	Episode: "There's Ben"
2009	Sit Down, Shut Up	Andrew LeGustambos (voice)	13 episodes
2009–2010	WordGirl	Reuben Grinder (voice)	2 episodes
2009–2015	The League	Rodney Ruxin	Main cast; also writer
2010	Nick Swardson's Pretend Time	Headmaster	Episode: "I Just Got Voodoo'd"
2010	John Oliver's New York Stand-Up Show	Himself	Episode: "1.1" (as Fabrice Fabrice), "1.5"
2011	Community	Juergen	Episode: "Foosball and Nocturnal Vigilantism"
2011	Portlandia	Daniel Prison	2 episodes
2011–2012	American Dad!	Dry Cleaner, Student, Andy Dick (voice)	4 episodes
2011–2015	Parks and Recreation	The Douche	5 episodes
2012–2016	Comedy Bang! Bang!	Various	5 episodes
2013–2015	Kroll Show	Various characters	23 episodes; also co-creator, executive producer, writer
2013	New Girl	Jamie	Episode: "Chicago"
2013	Burning Love	Khris	4 episodes
2013	The Greatest Event in Television History	Jeremy Bay	Episode: "Hart to Hart"
2013	The Soup	Himself	Episode: "9.55"
2013	Comedy Central Roast of James Franco	Roaster	TV special
2013	Family Guy	Ricky (voice)	Episode: "Into Harmony's Way"
2013	Brody Stevens: Enjoy It!	Himself	3 episodes
2013	The Jeselnik Offensive	Himself	2 episodes
2014	Drunk History	Ronald Reagan	Episode: "Hollywood"
2014	Mulaney	Jesse Tyler Munoz	Episode: "It's a Wonderful Home Alone"
2015	Brooklyn Nine-Nine	Agent Kendrick	Episode: "Windbreaker City"
2015	Unbreakable Kimmy Schmidt	Christopher "Tristafé" Micelli	Episode: "Kimmy Rides a Bike!"
2015	The Grace Helbig Show	Himself	Episode: "Nick Kroll & Tyler Oakley"
2015	The Simpsons	Lem (voice)	Episode: "Halloween of Horror"
2015	SuperMansion	Cleb (voice)	Episode: "Babes In The Wood"
2016	Animals.	Jerry (voice)	Episode: "Pigeons."
2016	Bajillion Dollar Propertie$	Graham Simon	Episode: "Predator Party"
2016	Mr. Neighbor's House	Photo Joe (voice)	TV special
2017	32nd Independent Spirit Awards	Himself (host)	TV special
2017–2021	Bob's Burgers	Mr. Desanto / Customer (voice)	2 episodes
2017	Oh, Hello on Broadway	Gil Faizon	TV special
2017	I'm Sorry	Lon	Episode: "Weekend Alone"
2017–2025	Big Mouth	Nick Birch / Maury the Hormone Monster / Coach Steve / Lola / various voices	81 episodes; also co-creator, executive producer, writer
2017	At Home with Amy Sedaris	Randy Fingerling	Episode: "Gift Giving"
2018	33rd Independent Spirit Awards	Himself (host)	TV special
2018	Explained	Narrator	Episode: "!"
2018	Portlandia	Gil Faizon	Episode: "Peter Follows P!nk"
2019–2022	What We Do in the Shadows	Simon the Devious	3 episodes
2019–2020	Crank Yankers	Himself (voice)	2 episodes
2020	Curb Your Enthusiasm	Restaurant Manager	Episode: "The Ugly Section"
2020	High Maintenance	Nick	Episode: "Trick"
2020	Home Movie: The Princess Bride	Vizzini / Inigo Montoya / Fezzik	Episode: "The Shrieking Eels"
2021	Dickinson	Edgar Allan Poe	Episode: "I'm Nobody! Who Are You?"
2022	Bust Down	DJ Jacuzzi (voice)	Episode: "Party of Two"
2022–2023	Human Resources	Maury the Hormone Monster / Rick / various voices	20 episodes; also co-creator, executive producer, writer
2022	Our Flag Means Death	Gabriel	2 episodes
2022	Roar	Doug	Episode: "The Woman Who Disappeared"
2023	History of the World, Part II	Various	8 episodes; also writer, director, and executive producer
2023	Extrapolations	Alpha (voice)	Episode: "2047: The Fifth Question"
2024	Last Week Tonight with John Oliver	Cantaloupe / Coconut (voice)	Episode: "Medicaid"
2024	John Mulaney Presents: Everybody's in LA	Gil Faizon	Episode: "Paranormal"
2024	Mr. Throwback	Himself	Episode: "Eric Roth Costs a Fortune, Bro"
2024	Krapopolis	Grarg/Jörmungandr (voices)	Episode: "Thor"
2024	The Franchise	Kyle	Episode: "Scene 83: Enter the Gurgler"
2026	Mating Season	Ray the Raccoon (voice)	Main role; also co-creator, executive producer, writer

== Awards and nominations ==
Year	Award	Category	Work	Result
2009	Denver Film Critics Society Award	Denver Film Critics Society Award for Best Acting Ensemble	I Love You, Man	Nominated
2015	People's Choice Award	Favorite Sketch Comedy TV Show	Kroll Show	Nominated
2017	Annie Award	Voice Acting in a Feature Production	Captain Underpants: The First Epic Movie	Nominated
2018	Gotham Award	Breakthrough Series – Long Form	Big Mouth	Nominated
2019	Primetime Emmy Award	Outstanding Animated Program	Big Mouth	Nominated
2020	Primetime Emmy Award	Outstanding Animated Program	Big Mouth	Nominated
2021	Primetime Emmy Award	Outstanding Animated Program	Big Mouth	Nominated
