= Nim's Island =

2008 film by Jennifer Flackett and Mark Levin

- Theatrical release poster
- Directed by: Jennifer Flackett; Mark Levin
- Screenplay by: Joseph Kwong; Paula Mazur; Mark Levin; Jennifer Flackett
- Based on: Nim's Island by Wendy Orr
- Produced by: Paula Mazur
- Starring: Abigail Breslin; Jodie Foster; Gerard Butler
- Cinematography: Stuart Dryburgh
- Edited by: Stuart Levy
- Music by: Patrick Doyle
- Production company: Walden Media
- Distributed by: 20th Century Fox (United States and Canada); Universal Pictures (United Kingdom, Australia, New Zealand, Spain, Latin America and Germany); Summit Entertainment (International)
- Release date: April 4, 2008
- Running time: 96 minutes
- Countries: United States; Australia
- Language: English
- Budget: $37 million
- Box office: $100.1 million

Nim's Island is a 2008 adventure film written and directed by Jennifer Flackett and Mark Levin, and based on the children's story of the same name by Wendy Orr. In the film, a young girl alone on a remote island seeks help from an agoraphobic San Franciscan author. While the author attempts to overcome her agoraphobia to search for her, Nim tries to overcome her fear of losing her father. It stars Abigail Breslin, Jodie Foster, and Gerard Butler, and was released on 4 April 2008 by 20th Century Fox under the "Fox-Walden" joint-venture. The film received mixed reviews from critics, who praised the performances, morals and production values, but criticized the characters, storyline, tone and product placement. It earned $100.1 million on a $37 million budget.

== Plot ==
11-year-old Nim Rusoe lives with her widower marine biologist father Jack on a secret island in the South Pacific. Nim's mother, Emily, died when she was eaten by a blue whale, after it was scared by a ship called The Buccaneer. Nim has several native animals for company: Selkie the sea lion, Fred the bearded dragon, Chica the sea turtle, and Galileo the pelican, and is an avid reader of the "Alex Rover" adventure book series.

Jack leaves on a two-day research trip to find Protozoa nim, a new species of nanoplankton he has named after his daughter. He wants to take Nim along, but she convinces him she can manage on her own and must stay to oversee the imminent hatching of Chica's eggs, both of them agreeing to communicate via satellite phone.

Nim receives an email addressed to her father from "Alex Rover", enquiring about Jack's field of knowledge. She believes it is from the adventurer, but is, in reality, from the author, Alexandra Rover, a neurotic agoraphobe from San Francisco, who believes Nim to be Jack's assistant. They begin to communicate frequently.

Jack's vessel is caught in a cyclone, leaving him stranded in the middle of the ocean and unable to communicate with Nim. Galileo brings Jack things he needs to fix the ship as sharks begin to circle the wreckage. Nim tells Alex her father has not returned as planned, while Alex feels powerless to help, given that she can hardly even open her own door. Eventually, Alex's visions of her character, Alex Rover, help her overcome her agoraphobia and travel to the island to help Nim.

Meanwhile, the island is visited by a cruise liner's crew, who Nim believes to be pirates, as the name of their ship is The Buccaneer, much like the vessel that caused her mother's death. The crew plan to make the island into a tourist destination, much to Nim's horror. When the crew return with tourists two days later, she attempts to make the island unattractive to them by catapulting Fred and various other lizards to shore, then by making a fire in the crater of the volcano and rolling boulders down the slopes to give the appearance of an eruption. In doing so, she inadvertently triggers an actual eruption, leaving the tourists and crew scrambling for the boats. One of them, a pre-teen boy, Edmund, sees and catches up with Nim. He is confused by her presence, and she tells him she lives on the island. He tells his parents, but neither one believes him. Meanwhile, Alex, having travelled through Borneo, Rarotonga and Tuvalu, arrives on The Buccaneer via helicopter during a monsoon, and attempts to explain herself to the crew, who dismiss her as delirious. However, Edmund, who overheard Alex explaining Nim, convinces her that she's not insane. Alex then escapes The Buccaneer on a stolen lifeboat. Nim sees Alex's boat capsize in the stormy sea, and saves her from drowning with the help of Selkie.

Having expected her hero from the books, Nim initially rejects Alex, but she later relents, and they share a meal together. The next morning, Nim breaks down to Alex, fearing that she has now lost both her parents. Luckily, Jack reaches the island windsurfing on a makeshift catamaran, tearfully reuniting with Nim and presenting her with her eponymous nanoplankton. Nim then introduces Jack to Alex, who is amazed at how similar Jack looks to her visions of the "Alex Rover" character.

== Cast ==
- Abigail Breslin as Nim Rusoe
- Jodie Foster as Alexandra "Alex" Rover
- Gerard Butler as Jack Rusoe / Alex Rover
- Anthony Simcoe as First Mate
- Alphonso McAuley as Russell
- Morgan Griffin as Alice
- Michael Carman as Captain
- Christopher Baker as Ensign
- Maddison Joyce as Edmund
- Peter Callan as Edmund's Father
- Rhonda Doyle as Edmund's Mother

== Production ==
Shooting took place on Hinchinbrook Island, off the northeast coast of Queensland, Australia over three weeks and ended in October 2007.

== Reception ==
The review aggregator Rotten Tomatoes reports that 51% of 101 surveyed critics gave the film a positive review; the average rating is 5.7/10. The site's consensus reads: "Despite good intentions, Nim's Island flounders under an implausible storyline, simplistic stock characters, and distracting product placement." Metacritic reported the film had an average score of 55 out of 100 based on 24 reviews. In its opening weekend, Nim's Island grossed $13.3 million in 3,513 theaters in the United States and Canada, ranking #2 at the box office behind 21. The film had a US box office gross of $48 million and a foreign gross of $52 million, for a total gross of $100 million worldwide. The film was nominated by the Visual Effects Society Awards in the category of Outstanding Supporting Visual Effects in a Feature Motion Picture.

== Home media release ==
Nim's Island was released on DVD on 5 August 2008. It opened at #1 at the DVD sales chart, selling 466,326 DVD units and earning $8.4 million. As per the latest figures, 1,013,100 DVD units have been sold, grossing $21.4 million in the US.

== Soundtrack ==
The score to Nim's Island was composed by award-winning composer Patrick Doyle. He recorded his score with the Hollywood Studio Symphony at the Sony Scoring Stage during the week of 3 February 2008. This marked the first time in a decade that he recorded a score in Los Angeles.

The song playing over the closing credits is "Beautiful Day" by U2.

The film's soundtrack CD was released on 8 April 2008 from Varèse Sarabande.

== Sequel ==
A sequel, Return to Nim's Island, was released theatrically in Australia on 4 April 2013 in 77 screens with an opening weekend box office take of AUS$176,848. It aired on the Hallmark Channel on 15 March in the U.S. and was released on DVD 19 March 2013, exclusively to Wal-Mart, and two days later on 21 March worldwide. Box Office Mojo reports AUS$1.1 million in revenues overall.

Bindi Irwin replaced Abigail Breslin as Nim Rusoe, Toby Wallace replaced Maddison Joyce as Edmund, and Matthew Lillard replaced Gerard Butler as Jack Rusoe, Nim's father.
