= Wendy Orr =

Canadian-born Australian writer (born 1968)

- Born: March 27, 1958 (age 68); Edmonton, Alberta, Canada
- Occupation: Author
- Writing career
- Genre: Children's Literature

Wendy Orr is a Canadian-born Australian writer born in Edmonton, Alberta. She is probably best known as the author of Nim's Island, which was made into a film in 2008 starring Jodie Foster, Abigail Breslin and Gerard Butler. In 1995, she received the CBCA Book of the Year, Younger Readers award.

Orr moved to Australia at the age of 21 and now lives in Victoria, on the Mornington Peninsula on a few acres of bushland. She has previously worked as an occupational therapist. In 1991, Orr suffered terrible injuries including a broken neck and two broken ankles when her car was hit by a car travelling at high speed. She spent the next five years dealing with the pain and walking with a cane. It took 15 years to recover but now she is well again. She says, "Readers borrow courage and resilience from books." Qualities Orr has displayed herself creating a huge body of work during her recovery.

== Works ==
Novels

- Peeling the Onion (1996)
- The House At Evelyn's Pond (2001)
- Dragonfly Song (2016)
- Swallow's Dance (2018)
- Cuckoo's Flight (2021)

Children's books

- The Tin Can Puppy (1990)
- Bad Martha (1991)
- Leaving It to You (1992)
- The Great Yackandandah Billy Cart Race (1993)
- Ark in the Park (1994)
- The Laziest Boy in the World (1994)
- Mindblowing! (1994)
- Dirtbikes (1995)
- The Bully Biscuit Gang (1996)
- Yasou Nikki (1996)
- Sally's Painting Room (1997)
- Alroy's Very Nearly Clean Bedroom (1997)
- Poppy's Path (2001)
- Spook's Shack (2003)
- Across the Dark Sea (2006)
- Too Much Stuff! (2006)
- Raven's Mountain (2011)

Paradise series:

1. Paradise Palace (1997)
2. Paradise Gold (1999)

Nim's Island series:

1. Nim's Island (2001)
2. Nim at Sea (2008)
3. Rescue on Nim's Island (2014)

Mokie and Bik series:

1. Mokie and Bik (2007)
2. Mokie and Bik Go to Sea (2008)

Rainbow Street Animal Shelter series:

1. LOST! A Dog Called Bear (2011)
2. MISSING! A Cat Called Buster (2011)
3. WANTED! A Guinea Pig Called Henry (2012)
4. ABANDONED! A Lion Called Kiki (2012)
5. STOLEN! A Pony Called Pebbles (2012)
6. DISCOVERED! A Beagle Called Bella (2013)

Picture books

- Amanda's Dinosaur (1990)
- Aa-choo! (1992)
- Jessica Joan (1994)
- Grandfather Martin (1996)
- Arabella (2000)
- The Princess and Her Panther (2010)

Micki and Daniel series:

1. Pegasus and Ooloomooloo (1993)
2. The Wedding (1993)
3. The Train to the City (1993)
