= Wimbledon (film) =

2004 film by Richard Loncraine

- Theatrical release poster
- Directed by: Richard Loncraine
- Written by: Adam Brooks; Jennifer Flackett; Mark Levin
- Produced by: Tim Bevan; Eric Fellner; Liza Chasin; Mary Richards
- Starring: Paul Bettany; Kirsten Dunst; Sam Neill; Jon Favreau
- Cinematography: Darius Khondji
- Edited by: Humphrey Dixon
- Music by: Edward Shearmur
- Production companies: StudioCanal; Working Title Films
- Distributed by: Universal Pictures (International); Mars Distribution (France)
- Release dates: 17 September 2004 (United States); 24 September 2004 (United Kingdom); 20 October 2004 (France)
- Running time: 98 minutes
- Countries: United Kingdom; United States; France
- Language: English
- Budget: $31 million
- Box office: $41.5 million

Wimbledon is a 2004 romantic comedy sports film directed by Richard Loncraine. It stars Paul Bettany as a veteran tennis player and Kirsten Dunst as a rising tennis star. Sam Neill and Jon Favreau co-star.

== Plot ==
Peter Colt, a British professional tennis player in his thirties whose ranking has slipped from 11th to 119th in the world, has never really had to fight for anything, as his wealthy family allowed him to easily pursue his tennis ambitions. Though he earns a wildcard spot to the Wimbledon tournament, he feels it's time to admit he's getting too old to compete with fitter up-and-coming younger players and intends, after this last Wimbledon, to take a job with a prestigious tennis club.

As Wimbledon begins, he is given the wrong hotel key and meets the American, Lizzie Bradbury, the rising star of women's tennis, who is in the shower when he walks in. They later meet and have what they agree is casual sex, but her interest in him changes his entire perception and gives him the strength to win again. After an unexpected win in the first round, Peter is about to lose his second match but turns it around when he hears Lizzie cheering for him in the crowd. In his third match, he unexpectedly comes up against his training partner and best friend, Dieter Prohl. Peter beats Dieter, who comments that Peter has developed a 'killer instinct', the ability to win the match no matter the cost or the method. Peter's unexpected success makes him a sensation in Britain, as many place their hopes on either him or his next competitor, Tom Cavendish, to deliver a British win at Wimbledon. Peter and Lizzie's relationship progresses despite the disapproval of Lizzie's father Dennis Bradbury, who believes it detrimental to her career.

At a reception for the Wimbledon players at the London Eye, Lizzie is approached by an apparent old flame, arrogant American star and world number 1 Jake Hammond. Hammond deduces that Peter and Lizzie are seeing each other when Peter defends her. When Hammond insults Lizzie, Peter punches him and the couple run away to Peter's flat in Brighton. The next day, Dennis comes to Peter's flat and yells at him for spoiling his daughter's game. Lizzie overhears this and decides to leave Peter and focus on her game. The next day, Peter faces off against Tom Cavendish and beats him when Cavendish sprains his ankle.

The night before their semifinal matches, Peter sneaks into Lizzie's hotel room and persuades her to have sex. The next day, he performs above expectations and wins in straight sets, but Lizzie loses. Lizzie angrily breaks up with Peter, claiming his selfishness and need for sex before a match made her lose and she decides to immediately return to the United States to train.

Peter is set to play in the Wimbledon final against Jake Hammond. At the airport, Lizzie watches an interview on TV in which Peter apologises and declares his love for her. She returns to Wimbledon.

As Lizzie reaches the stadium, Peter has lost the first two sets of the final and is behind in the third. When the game is suspended due to rain, Lizzie appears in the dressing room and forgives him and says she loves him. She tells him the secret of Jake's tricky serves and Peter fights back to win the title (3–6, 2–6, 6–4, 7–6^{(8–6)}, 6–4). Now a national hero in Britain, he and Lizzie get married. With his support, Lizzie goes on to win the U.S. Open and win Wimbledon twice, ultimately achieving her dreams. In the last scene, Peter is with their younger child, a boy, watching Lizzie and their elder child, a girl, playing tennis on a neighbourhood court in New York City.

== Cast ==
- Paul Bettany as Peter Colt
- Kirsten Dunst as Lizzie Bradbury
- Sam Neill as Dennis Bradbury
- James McAvoy as Carl Colt
- Bernard Hill as Edward Colt
- Eleanor Bron as Augusta Colt
- Celia Imrie as Mrs Kenwood
- Nikolaj Coster-Waldau as Dieter Prohl
- Austin Nichols as Jake Hammond
- Jon Favreau as Ron Roth
- Jonathan Timmins as the Ballboy
- Robert Lindsay as Ian Frazier
- Martin Wimbush as Court Official
- Cecilia Dazzi as Billi Clementi

Real tennis professionals on set

- Dominic Inglot as Paul Bettany's tennis double
- Vikas Punna as Ajay Bhatt
- Beti Sekulovski as Lizzie's first opponent
- Murphy Jensen as Ivan Dragomir
- Alun Jones as Tom Cavendish
- Rebecca Dandeniya as Arliyia Rupesinghe
- John McEnroe as himself/commentator
- Chris Evert as herself/commentator
- Mary Carillo as herself/commentator
- John Barrett as himself/commentator
- Pat Cash was the tennis adviser on set and trained the actors.

== Production ==
=== Writing ===
The film is dedicated to Mark McCormack, founder of International Management Group, a management firm for high-level athletes, who died on 16 May 2003.

=== Casting ===
The film used locally recruited Wimbledon residents as extras for the crowd scenes.

Kirsten Dunst was under contract with Harvey Weinstein at Miramax and to complete the contract, she agreed to do the film, provided she could select her costar. She selected Paul Bettany.

=== Filming ===
The actors served with real tennis balls. All others were added digitally to make it appear like they were playing.

=== Locations ===
Some scenes were filmed during the 2003 Championships between matches. It is the only time in the history of the tournament that this has been allowed. Some court scenes with Bettany were filmed at the Stoke Park Country Club, home of The Boodles Challenge. The beachfront scenes were filmed on location in Brighton.

== Reception ==
=== Critical reception ===
Wimbledon received mixed reviews, holding a score of 60% on review aggregator Rotten Tomatoes, based on 144 reviews with an average rating of 5.9/10. The consensus reads, "A predictable, bland rom-com, but Bettany proves to be an appealing lead." It received "average" or "mixed" reviews from Metacritic, a 59 out of 100 based on reviews by 35 critics. Audiences polled by CinemaScore gave the film an average grade of "B+" on an A+ to F scale.

Stephen Holden of The New York Times wrote that Wimbledon was "much more conventional" than Loncraine's previous films but with "cleverer-than-average dialogue and sharply drawn subsidiary characters". Michael Charlotte's review for Empire gave the film three out of five stars, saying, "In tennis parlance, this fires off more moonballs to stay in play than outright winning shots. But Bettany is charming, and thankfully he and Dunst are appealing together".

Roger Ebert gave the film a positive review: "Wimbledon is a well-behaved movie about nice people who have good things happen to them. That's kind of startling, in a world where movie characters, especially in sports movies, occupy the edge of human experience. What a surprise to hear conversation instead of dialogue, and to realize that the villain may actually be right some of the time". He gave the film three out of four stars.

=== Box office ===
The film opened at number four, grossing US$7.1 million in its opening weekend at the North American box office.

== Soundtrack ==
The film's digital soundtrack uses the "Surround EX" format. The song that plays in the trailer of the film is "Everlasting Love" by U2. The film features two songs by the Sugababes: "Caught in a Moment" and "Sometimes", both from the album Three.
