= The Story of Us (1999 film) =

1999 film by Rob Reiner

- Theatrical release poster
- Directed by: Rob Reiner
- Written by: Alan Zweibel; Jessie Nelson
- Produced by: Rob Reiner; Jessie Nelson; Alan Zweibel
- Starring: Bruce Willis; Michelle Pfeiffer
- Cinematography: Michael Chapman
- Edited by: Alan Edward Bell; Robert Leighton
- Music by: Eric Clapton; Marc Shaiman
- Production company: Castle Rock Entertainment
- Distributed by: Universal Pictures; (United States, Canada, Australia and New Zealand); Warner Bros.; (international)
- Release dates: October 13, 1999 (premiere); October 15, 1999 (United States)
- Running time: 95 minutes
- Country: United States
- Languages: English; Italian
- Budget: $50 million
- Box office: $58.9 million

The Story of Us is a 1999 American romantic comedy-drama film directed by Rob Reiner, and starring Bruce Willis and Michelle Pfeiffer as a couple married for 15 years.

The depiction of the marriage through a series of nonlinear flashbacks is reminiscent of Two for the Road (1967) starring Albert Finney and Audrey Hepburn, while the "interview" segments featuring characters addressing the camera directly as a therapist are reminiscent of Reiner's previous film When Harry Met Sally... (1989) starring Billy Crystal and Meg Ryan.

The Story of Us premiered on October 13, 1999 and was released by Universal Pictures on October 15, 1999 in the United States, with Warner Bros. releasing in other territories. The film received negative reviews from critics and grossed $58.9 million against a $50 million budget.

== Plot ==
Ben and Katie Jordan have been married for 15 years and have two children, Erin and Josh, a nice home and a comfortable life. Their initially happy marriage, however, turns into a sham: a performance they deliver daily for the benefit of their children. Behind the scenes they cannot stand each other anymore.

They met while working for a comedy show, and instantly connected. Katie flashes back to moments where they argued, saying eventually they replaced the arguing with silence. After sending their kids off to summer camp, Ben and Katie commence a trial separation, during which both try to recall what it is about the other that led them to fall in love in the first place.

They both meet with their corresponding circles of friends, each sharing what is happening in their relationships, including intimacy, except the Jordans. Ben flashes back to a phone call with Katie, where neither is really listening to the other.

One night, after each of them has a positive flashback, they have a brief call about the kids. Another day, she calls him seeking a number and alerting him that his dry-cleaning was delivered, and he goes to the house for dinner. Both are nervous, but the dinner goes well, so they go to their bedroom. They chat about their various marriage counselors they've seen over the years, then both feel like their corresponding parents are present. While Ben wants to make up, Katie says they first need to repair problems, which leads to an argument where she storms off.

Mid-summer they go to Parents' Day at camp. Ben breaks down upon seeing their kids, but both he and Katie maintain their composure throughout the day. Erin sneaks into their room that night. Ben flashes back to a year ago. Ben and Katie took a trip to Italy, which worked well until they were back home, where they fell back to old patterns.

Back home, Katie goes to a Thai cooking class recommended by a divorcé. He asks her to dinner. In the meantime, Ben goes to dinner with a couple they're friends with. After he has a meltdown, he has an epiphany about her perspective. Rushing home, he finds his wife preparing dinner with the divorcè.

A bit before Ben and Katie go to pick up the kids from camp, they agree on a plan to tell the kids, starting with a nice dinner. On the way, Katie is hit with a wave of memories of their life together, both good and bad. This time Katie cries when seeing the kids. Ben names the restaurant they'd agreed on, but she counter-proposes another. Then she monologues about how they have to take the bad with the good. And they stay together.

== Cast ==
- Bruce Willis as Ben Jordan
- Michelle Pfeiffer as Katie Jordan
- Rita Wilson as Rachel Krogan
- Rob Reiner as Stan Krogan
- Julie Hagerty as Liza
- Tim Matheson as Marty
- Lucy Webb as Joanie Kirby
- Bill Kirchenbauer as Eddie Kirby
- Red Buttons as Arnie Jordan
- Jayne Meadows as Dot
- Tom Poston as Harry
- Betty White as Lillian Jordan

== Reception ==
=== Critical reception ===
The Story of Us received generally negative reviews. On review aggregator website Rotten Tomatoes, the film holds an approval rating of 26% based on 120 reviews, and an average rating of 4.8/10. The website's critical consensus reads, "A lack of chemistry between Bruce Willis and Michelle Pfeiffer fatally undermines the dull and predictable Story of Us." On Metacritic, the film has a weighted average score of 37 out of 100, based on 33 critics, indicating "generally unfavorable reviews". Audiences polled by CinemaScore gave the film an average grade of "B−" on an A+ to F scale.

In The New York Times, Janet Maslin wrote: "The Story of Us offers such an arthritic vision of middle-aged marriage that it feels like the first Jack Lemmon comedy made expressly for the baby boom generation. Perhaps that would explain the casting of Bruce Willis as a jokey but sensitive suburban Dad and Michelle Pfeiffer as his beleaguered spouse. The stars, variously directed by Rob Reiner to kid around, look wistful or scream so hard that their necks turn red, are not helped by the film's elbow-in-the-ribs humor or its overbearing tactics. Though it sets out to explain why this marriage is worth saving, The Story of Us could prompt even single members of the audience to file for divorce."

In the Los Angeles Times, Kenneth Turan wrote: "A wannabe sensitive film that's scared of cutting too deeply, The Story of Us doesn't want to be real enough to jeopardize its homogenized humor. While it's already hard to accept carefully photographed major stars like Willis and Pfeiffer as regular folks with everyday problems, it's even harder when both their fun and their fury seem slickly scripted. Not only don't we feel the Jordans' pain, it's not clear that we even want to... Pfeiffer and Willis acquit themselves as well as the script and direction allow, though Willis' romantic comedy timing does seem to have gotten rusty since his Moonlighting days. Their movie-stars-yelling-at-each-other relationship doesn't feel much more real than the happily married act they put on for their kids."

In the Chicago Sun-Times, Roger Ebert awarded the film a one star and wrote: "Gene Siskel used to ask if a movie was as good as a documentary of the same actors having lunch. Watching The Story of Us, I imagined a documentary of the marriage of, say, Bruce Willis and Demi Moore. I do not say that to score a cheap point, but because Moore and Willis are spirited and intelligent people who no doubt had interesting fights about real issues, and not insipid fights about sitcom issues... there is a restaurant scene in which Willis screams angrily in an unsuccessful (indeed, melancholy) attempt to rip off Meg Ryan's famous restaurant orgasm in Reiner's When Harry Met Sally... At the end of his tirade, Willis jumps up and tells Reiner what he can "shove up the tops of your legs!" Doesn't work, because (a) he's too angry to think up or stop for a punch line, (b) the line isn't funny, and (c) the setup wasn't funny, either, because the concept isn't funny. Oh, and the scene ends with Reiner doing a double-take directly into the camera. How many ways can one scene be mishandled? Who thought this movie would be entertaining? The same person who thinks we need more dialogue about why guys do the wrong thing with rolls of toilet paper. And who thinks the misery of this film can be repaired by a showboat monologue at the end that's well-delivered by Pfeiffer, but reads like an audition scene."

In the San Francisco Chronicle, Mick LaSalle wrote: "Anyone so naive as to turn to Hollywood for a wise and honest statement about marriage deserves this film... One thing the movie accomplishes: It shows how arguments can flare up out of nowhere and become shouting matches. Pfeiffer and Willis are convincingly married in those moments... Reiner compounds dishonest writing with dishonest direction. Though Katie gushes to her husband within earshot of her kids, he never cuts to the children for their reactions. In fact, he tries to make us believe the kids didn't hear a thing. It's typical of The Story of Us, which is not really about marriage. It's about Kodak moments."

In The Washington Post, Stephen Hunter wrote: "Willis seems particularly miscast. His tendencies toward smirkiness have been encouraged and sentimentalized. As for Pfeiffer, she spends so much time screaming at him for failing to fill the windshield wiper fluid container in the van that it's easy to forget she is one of the world's most beautiful women and gifted actresses. Michelle, enough with the mommy crap! Get a cocktail dress and a pair of very high-heeled Steve Maddens, and make us dream about you again."

Empire wrote: "Essentially, it's When Sally Divorced Harry... as Bruce (playing Bruce) and Michelle (the whining wife) try a temporary separation, then proceed to dissect their marriage with the obligatory flashbacks (Bruce Willis with long hair getting the only laugh) and weakly written Nora Ephron-esque chats with witty pals (Bruce gets Reiner and Paul Reiser, Michelle gets Rita Wilson), which only serve to remind us how much better this would have been if Reiner had hired Ephron to write it."

Time Out wrote: "Time has steadily coarsened Reiner's once sure touch for frantic comedy, and although he neutralises the more sentimental elements of Alan Zweibel and Jessie Nelson's banal screenplay, his failure to flesh out or evoke sympathy for either character reduces the movie to an unedifying slanging match."

=== Awards and nominations ===
Colleen Rennison was nominated for a Young Artist Award for Best Performance in a Feature Film - Supporting Young Actress.
