= Mark Levin (director) =

American director, producer and screenwriter

- Born: August 20, 1968 (age 58); Detroit, Michigan, U.S.
- Occupations: Director; screenwriter; producer
- Years active: 1992–present
- Spouse: Jennifer Flackett
- Children: 2

Mark Levin (born August 20, 1968) is an American screenwriter, film director, and television producer. He is best known as the co-creator of the Netflix animated series Big Mouth and its spin-off Human Resources. He also directed the films Little Manhattan and Nim's Island. He is married to his collaborator, the screenwriter and director Jennifer Flackett. They are the creators of The Man's Guide To Love, which began as a successful video blog offering man to man advice on the subject of love. The Man's Guide To Love book will be published by Simon & Schuster, and a feature film they are directing and producing alongside Laurence Mark.

== Career ==
=== Television ===
Levin began his career in television during the 1990s. He served as a writer and producer for the series The Wonder Years. He was also a writer and producer for the television series Missing Persons (produced by Stephen J. Cannell). In 1994, he co-created the science fiction series Earth 2 for NBC, which ran for one season.

In 2017, Levin co-created the adult animated sitcom Big Mouth for Netflix alongside Flackett and comedians Nick Kroll and Andrew Goldberg. The series, based on Kroll and Goldberg's teenage years, has received critical acclaim for its frank portrayal of puberty. Under their production banner, Brutus Pink, Levin and his partners signed a multi-year deal with Netflix in 2019, which led to the creation of the spin-off series Human Resources.

=== Film ===
Levin made his screenwriting debut with the 1998 live-action adaptation of Madeline. He later wrote the screenplay for the romantic comedy Wimbledon (2004).

He made his directorial debut with Little Manhattan (2005), a film centered on the first love of a young boy in New York City. The screenplay was written by his wife, Jennifer Flackett. While Levin received sole directing credit, the couple has stated that they collaborate closely on all aspects of production.

In 2008, Levin co-directed the adventure film Nim's Island with Flackett, starring Jodie Foster, Abigail Breslin, and Gerard Butler. That same year, he was a screenwriter for Journey to the Center of the Earth, starring Brendan Fraser.

== Personal life ==
Levin grew up in Detroit, the son of Donald Marvin Levin. He has one sister and one brother. Levin, his wife and two children live in New York City and Los Angeles. In 2012, Levin & Flackett undertook a one-year journey around-the-world with their two children. Dubbed "A Year To Think," they visited 38 countries and 110 cities across six continents over 365 days, during which they made 120 short films about their experiences. He is of Jewish descent.

== Filmography ==
| Year | Title | Director | Writer |
|---|---|---|---|
| 1998 | Madeline | No | Yes |
| 2004 | Wimbledon | No | Yes |
| 2005 | Little Manhattan | Yes | No |
| 2008 | Nim's Island | Yes | Yes |
| 2008 | Journey to the Center of the Earth | No | Yes |
| 2022 | The Adam Project | No | Yes |
