= Jennifer Flackett =

American screenwriter, producer, and director

- Born: Newton, Massachusetts, U.S.
- Occupations: Screenwriter, producer, director
- Years active: 1988–present
- Spouse: Mark Levin
- Children: 2

Jennifer Flackett is an American screenwriter, producer, and director. In television, she has written for series Beverly Hills, 90210, L.A. Law and Earth 2. As a screenwriter, she wrote on the films Madeline (1998), Wimbledon (2004), Little Manhattan (2005), Journey to the Center of the Earth (2008), and Nim's Island (2008), which she also directed.

Flackett works alongside her husband, fellow director and screenwriter Mark Levin. They are the creators of The Man's Guide to Love, which began as a successful video blog offering man-to-man advice on the subject of love. The Man's Guide to Love book will be published by Simon & Schuster, and a feature film they are directing and producing alongside Laurence Mark. Principal photography on The Man's Guide to Love movie commences in Spring 2015.

In 2017, she co-created the animated sitcom Big Mouth, with Levin, Nick Kroll, and Andrew Goldberg.

In 2014 they were writing and creating the half-hour single-camera TV shows Confusing for NBC, and The Courtship of Eddie's Father for Warner Brothers Television.

Both Flackett and Levin made their directorial debut with the film Little Manhattan, although Flackett was not formally credited for her directing work on the film; she was only credited as a writer.

Flackett grew up in Newton, Massachusetts and graduated from Wesleyan University in 1986.

Levin & Flackett recently returned from a one-year, around-the-world journey with their two children. Dubbed "A Year To Think," they visited 38 countries and 110 cities across six continents over 365 days, during which they made 120 short films about their experiences.

== Filmography ==
Year	Title	Director	Writer
1998	Madeline	No	Yes
2004	Wimbledon	No	Yes
2005	Little Manhattan	No	Yes
2008	Nim's Island	Yes	Yes
2008	Journey to the Center of the Earth	No	Yes
2022	The Adam Project	No	Yes
