= Big Mouth season 3 =

Season of television series

Big Mouth
- Season 3
- Season 3 promotional poster
- Starring: Nick Kroll; John Mulaney; Jessi Klein; Jason Mantzoukas; Jenny Slate; Fred Armisen; Maya Rudolph; Jordan Peele
- No. of episodes: 11

Release
- Original network: Netflix
- Original release: February 8 – October 4, 2019

Season chronology
- ← Previous; Season 2 Next → Season 4

The third season of Big Mouth, an American adult animated coming-of-age sitcom created by Andrew Goldberg, Nick Kroll, Mark Levin, and Jennifer Flackett, was released on Netflix on October 4, 2019; with a Valentine's Day special released several months earlier on February 8, 2019. The series centers on teens based on Kroll and Goldberg's upbringing in suburban New York, with Kroll voicing his fictional younger self. Big Mouth explores puberty while "embrac[ing] a frankness about the human body and sex."

== Cast and characters ==
=== Main ===
- Nick Kroll as Nick Birch, Maurice the Hormone Monster, Coach Steve Steve (President Roosevelt), Rick the Hormone Monster, Lola Skumpy, Ladybug, Michael Shannon, Raccoons, Vin Diesel, Judge Joe Brown, Mila and Lotte Jansen, Sylvester Stallone and others
- John Mulaney as Andrew Glouberman and Detective Florez
- Jessi Klein as Jessi Glaser and
  - Klein also voices Jessi's possible ancestor, Margaret Daniels
- Jason Mantzoukas as Jay Bilzerian
  - Mantzoukas also voices Guy Bilzerian
- Jenny Slate as Missy Foreman-Greenwald, Mirror Missy, Vicky and Waitress
- Fred Armisen as Elliot Birch
  - Armisen also voices Lee Daniels
- Maya Rudolph as Connie the Hormone Monstress, Diane Birch, Principal Barren, Whitney Houston, Miss Clinckscales and others
- Jordan Peele as Ghost of Duke Ellington, Cyrus Forman-Greenwald, Featuring Ludacris, and Ghosts of Freddie Mercury, Burt Reynolds, and Prince

=== Recurring ===
- Andrew Rannells as Matthew MacDell
- Paula Pell as Barbara Glouberman
- Richard Kind as Marty Glouberman
- Seth Morris as Greg Glaser
- Jessica Chaffin as Shannon Glaser
- June Diane Raphael as Devin
- Jak Knight as DeVon
- Neil Casey as Lars and Detective Dumont
- Joe Wengert as Caleb and Lump Humpman
- Fran Gillespie as Samira
- Jon Daly as Judd Birch
- Kat Dennings as Leah Birch
- Chelsea Peretti as Monica Foreman-Greenwald
  - Peretti also voices Cellsea
- Heather Lawless as Jenna "Jay's Mom" Bilzerian
- Mark Duplass and Paul Scheer as Val and Kurt Bilzerian
- Gina Rodriguez as Gina Alvarez
- Rob Huebel as Mr. Terry Lizer
- Zachary Quinto as Aiden
- Michaela Watkins as Cantor Dina Reznick

=== Guest ===
- Ali Wong as Ali
- Gary Cole as Edward MacDell
- Julie White as Kimberly MacDell
- Julie Klausner as Cherry Marashina
- Judd Hirsch as Lewis Glouberman
- David Cross as Skip Glouberman
- Thandie Newton as Mona
- Martin Short as Gordie
- Carol Kane as the Menopause Banshee
- Wanda Sykes as the ghost of Harriet Tubman
- Rob Riggle as Col. Adderall
- Antoni Porowski, Tan France, Karamo Brown, Bobby Berk, and Jonathan Van Ness from Queer Eye as themselves
- Retta as Daisy Ellington
- David Thewlis as Lionel St. Swithens
- Andy Daly as Dr. Wendy Engle, Dr. Granville and Ghost of Harry Houdini
- Kristen Wiig as Jessi's vulva
- Natasha Lyonne as Suzette
- Jean Smart as Kitty Bouchet
- Nathan Fillion as himself
- Jack McBrayer as Nick's pubic hair #1
- Craig Robinson as Harvey Brooks
- Rosa Salazar as Miss Benitez
- Joel Kim Booster as Charles Lu

== Episodes ==
| No. overall | No. in season | Title | Directed by | Written by | Original release date |
|---|---|---|---|---|---|
| 21 | 1 | "My Furry Valentine" | Kim Arndt & Bob Suarez | Story by : Andrew Goldberg, Jennifer Flackett & Joe Wengert; Teleplay by : Emily Altman & Victor Quinaz | February 8, 2019 |
| 21 | 1 | "My Furry Valentine" | Kim Arndt & Bob Suarez | Story by : Nick Kroll, Mark Levin & Kelly Galuska; Teleplay by : Gil Ozeri & Jaboukie Young-White | February 8, 2019 |
On Valentine's Day Nick Birch and Jessi Glaser are feeling down, Jessi over her mom's love life and Nick over having Connie the Hormone Monstress as his new hormone monster. Andrew Glouberman plans to use the day to win back Missy Foreman-Greenwald and it backfires, which results in him physically attacking Lars, a boy in a wheelchair. Jay Bilzerian plans a date with his male and female pillows, but it ends with them breaking up. Matthew, the only openly gay boy in the school, is starting a friendship with Jessi and meets a gay boy. At dinner, with his mother and father, Nick lashes out at the two for the first time. Meanwhile, at the Valentine's Day party at Lola's house, DeVon, the boyfriend of Devin, proposes marriage to her and she says yes.
| 22 | 2 | "Girls Are Angry Too" | Bob Suarez | Hayley Adams, JoEllen Redlingshafer & Kelsey Cressman | October 4, 2019 |
Two weeks have passed after the Valentine's Day party at Lola's house. Jay cuts off Andrew's finger in shop class, Jay's father blaming it on the girls' clothes. The girls protest Mr. Lizer's dress code. Nick and Andrew try to find out what the girls want. Jay, in the midst of his break from masturbating, has sex with a turkey.
| 23 | 3 | "Cellsea" | Bryan Francis | Joe Wengert | October 4, 2019 |
Matthew tries to contact Aiden again. Meanwhile, Nick gets a sentient hand-me-down cell phone from Leah and starts to develop a smartphone addiction, and Andrew unplugs.
| 24 | 4 | "Obsessed" | Joel Moser | Kelly Galuska & Jaboukie Young-White | October 4, 2019 |
Nick's obsession with Cellsea grows. Meanwhile, Matthew goes on his first date with Aiden and Jay collaborates with Missy on her Nathan Fillion/Rock of Gibraltar crossover fanfiction.
| 25 | 5 | "Florida" | Kim Arndt | Victor Quinaz | October 4, 2019 |
Nick goes with Andrew's family to Florida to celebrate Pesach. Meanwhile, Jay is left behind by his family while his house is fumigated, and he ends up living with Nick's family, who treat him with kindness. Andrew starts to have feelings for his flirtatious cousin, Cherry Marashino. Andrew's mother starts going through menopause.
| 26 | 6 | "How To Have An Orgasm" | Bob Suarez | Emily Altman | October 4, 2019 |
Jessi learns more about masturbation and her electric toothbrush, while her mother, Shannon Glaser and Cantor Dina Reznick break up. Meanwhile, Andrew decides to send a dick pic to his cousin, and Nick grows jealous of Jay living in their home.
| 27 | 7 | "Duke" | Bryan Francis | Gil Ozeri & Jak Knight | October 4, 2019 |
The Ghost of Duke Ellington tells the boys the story of how he lost his virginity in 1913.
| 28 | 8 | "Rankings" | Joel Moser | Kelly Galuska | October 4, 2019 |
At DeVon’s bachelor party, the boys make lists of the hottest girls in 7th grade, starting list fever at Bridgeton High, which causes the girls make lists of their own. Meanwhile, after a new pansexual girl named Ali joins the class, Jay finally comes out as bisexual. The episode ends with the "wedding" of DeVon and Devin.
| 29 | 9 | "The ASSes" | Kim Arndt | Joe Wengert & Max Silvestri | October 4, 2019 |
When Jay is prescribed Adderall, he does a better job focusing in class. After doing very well on his Academic Skills Survey (or ASS) other kids start asking for Jay's Adderall, which he sells to them. Jessi's mother starts planning Jessi's life for her, which brings back the Depression Kitty. During one of the final tests, detectives burst into the class and arrest Jay for drug dealing.
| 30 | 10 | "Disclosure the Movie: The Musical!" | Bob Suarez | Emily Altman & Victor Quinaz | October 4, 2019 |
During rehearsals for the spring musical, a musical version of the film Disclosure, Nick playing Michael Douglas and Missy playing Demi Moore, develop sexual tension, which leads Missy to meet her new hormone monstress named Mona, ending in a kiss that Andrew sees. Meanwhile, Mr. Lizer takes advantage of an oblivious Lola and is fired. The Fab Five from Queer Eye make over Coach Steve; afterwards, he gets his old job back.
| 31 | 11 | "Super Mouth" | Bryan Francis & Mike L. Mayfield | Gil Ozeri | October 4, 2019 |
During a freak storm, every student at Bridgeton gains superpowers. Andrew, who is able to become invisible, and Nick, who can change size, start to fight. Missy can control weather with her feelings. Jessi can make people tell the truth with a touch and finds out how she and her mother are moving to the city. The superpowers are later revealed to actually be the imagination of Caleb, drawing their superhero personas while watching them argue and fight. The season ends on a note of uncertainty, as Andrew ends his friendship with Nick, Nick breaks up with Missy, Jessi and Shannon begin the process of selling their house, and Marty sports an eyepatch for some unknown reason.

== Reception ==
=== Critical response ===
Rotten Tomatoes, the third season has an approval rating of 97% based on 33 reviews with an average rating of 8.00 out 10. The website's critics consensus reads, "Like the characters at its center, Big Mouth's third season continues to grow, taking on complicated new issues with the same gross-but-utterly-empathetic eye that made it so lovable in the first place." On Metacritic, it has a score of 84 out of 100 for the third season, based on five critics, indicating "universal acclaim". On Metacritic, it holds a rating of 80 out of 100, based on six critics, indicating "generally favorable reviews".

=== Accolades ===
| Year | Award | Category | Nominee(s) | Result | Ref. |
|---|---|---|---|---|---|
| 2020 | Casting Society of America | Television – Animation | Julie Ashton-Barson | Won | |
| 2020 | Primetime Emmy Awards | Outstanding Animated Program | Big Mouth (for "Disclosure the Movie: The Musical") | Nominated | |
| 2020 | Primetime Emmy Awards | Outstanding Character Voice-Over Performance | Maya Rudolph as Connie the Hormone Monstress (for "How To Have An Orgasm") | Won | |
| 2020 | Primetime Emmy Awards | Outstanding Derivative Interactive Program | Big Mouth Guide to Life | Won | |
