= Big Mouth season 2 =

Season of television series

Big Mouth
- Season 2
- Season 2 promotional poster
- Starring: Nick Kroll; John Mulaney; Jessi Klein; Jason Mantzoukas; Jenny Slate; Fred Armisen; Maya Rudolph; Jordan Peele
- No. of episodes: 10

Release
- Original network: Netflix
- Original release: October 5, 2018

Season chronology
- ← Previous; Season 1 Next → Season 3

The second season of Big Mouth, an American adult animated coming-of-age sitcom created by Andrew Goldberg, Nick Kroll, Mark Levin, and Jennifer Flackett, was released on Netflix on October 5, 2018. The series centers on teens based on Kroll and Goldberg's upbringing in suburban New York, with Kroll voicing his fictional younger self. Big Mouth explores puberty while "embrac[ing] a frankness about the human body and sex."

== Cast and characters ==
=== Main ===
- Nick Kroll as Nick Birch, Maurice the Hormone Monster, Coach Steve, Rick the Hormone Monster, Lola Skumpy, Nick Starr, Mila and Lotte Jensen, a webcam girl, Gina's Abuela, Bad Mitten, Rabbi Poblart and others
- John Mulaney as Andrew Glouberman, Detective Florez and Andrew 3000
- Jessi Klein as Jessi Glaser
- Jason Mantzoukas as Jay Bilzerian, Guy Bilzerian, Radio DJ and Gina's Brother #1
- Jenny Slate as Missy Foreman-Greenwald, Mirror Missy, Taffiny, The Implant and Additional Voices
- Fred Armisen as Elliot Birch, Bob the Hormone Monster and a Bus Driver
- Maya Rudolph as Diane Birch, Connie the Hormone Monstress, Susan, The Pill and Principal Barren
- Jordan Peele as the Ghost of Duke Ellington (1899–1974), Featuring Ludacris, Cyrus Foreman, Priest, Condom and Magician #2

=== Recurring ===
- Andrew Rannells as Matthew MacDell
- Paula Pell as Barbara Glouberman
- Richard Kind as Marty Glouberman
- Seth Morris as Greg Glaser
- Jessica Chaffin as Shannon Glaser, Grace and Intellect Sphinx
- June Diane Raphael as Devin
- Jak Knight as DeVon
- Neil Casey as Lars
- Joe Wengert as Caleb and Additional Voices
- Fran Gilesspie as Samira
- Jon Daly as Judd Birch
- Kat Dennings as Leah Birch
- Chelsea Peretti as Monica Foreman-Greenwald
- Heather Lawless as Jenna "Jay's Mom" Bilzerian
- Nathan Fillion as himself
- David Thewlis as Lionel St. Swithens
- John Gemberling as Tyler
- Gil Ozeri as Wiggles, Brad and Additional Voices
- Gina Rodriguez as Gina Alvarez

=== Guest ===
- Mark Duplass and Paul Scheer as Val and Kurt Bilzerian
- Rob Huebel as Mr. Terry Lizer
- Kristen Bell as Pam
- Jack McBrayer and Craig Robinson as Nick's pubic hairs
- Rosa Salazar as Miss Benitez
- Michaela Watkins as Cantor Dina Reznick
- Natasha Lyonne as Suzette
- Andy Daly as Dr. Wendy Engle and a motel pillow
- Harvey Fierstein as Jerome
- Jean Smart as Depression Kitty
- Bobby Cannavale as Gavin Reeves
- Zach Woods as a sock

== Episodes ==
No. overall	No. in season	Title	Directed by	Written by	Original release date
11	1	"Am I Normal?"	Bob Suarez	Andrew Goldberg	October 5, 2018
Jay and Jessi live life on the lam. Nick questions his hormone monster selection.
12	2	"What Is It About Boobs?"	Bryan Francis	Kelly Galuska	October 5, 2018
After one of their classmates, Gina Alvarez, becomes an early bloomer through breast development, the other boys become more interested in her and the girls start to feel insecure about their own bodies, especially Missy.
13	3	"The Shame Wizard"	Joel Moser	Victor Quinaz	October 5, 2018
After Andrew is caught masturbating to Nick's sister Leah's bathing suit, the Shame Wizard puts him on trial. Meanwhile, Nick ponders if his relationship with Gina is working at all; Jessi, to get back at her mother, starts going bad; and Coach Steve befriends Jay.
14	4	"Steve the Virgin"	Bob Suarez	Joe Wengert	October 5, 2018
After Jay and Rick set him up with Jay's mother, Coach Steve plans to lose his virginity. Meanwhile, Jessi's rebellious streak continues, but she gets caught; Nick, still not over his failed relationship with Gina, goes on a miniature golf double date with Devin, Andrew, and Lola; the Shame Wizard continues to taunt Andrew, but this time, it's over his relationship with the verbally abusive and intense Lola.
15	5	"The Planned Parenthood Show"	Bryan Francis	Emily Altman	October 5, 2018
Coach Steve teaches health class, which he is clearly unqualified for, so the students put on a sketch show about the many things Planned Parenthood provides.
16	6	"Drug Buddies"	Joel Moser	Gil Ozeri	October 5, 2018
Wanting to take their minds off of their problems, and fed up with how life's going for the both of them, Jessi and Nick get high on Jessi's dad's weed gummies. Meanwhile, despite peer pressure from the Shame Wizard Andrew tries to get out of his relationship with Lola.
17	7	"Guy Town"	Bob Suarez	Joe Wengert	October 5, 2018
The other dads and the kids help Greg move into Guy Bilzarian's unsanitary condo, Guy Town. While filming a documentary about the condo, Matthew becomes interested in an elderly gay resident. Nick meets his new Hormone Monster.
18	8	"Dark Side of the Boob"	Bryan Francis	Kelly Galuska	October 5, 2018
(Part 1 of 3) At a school sleepover, the Shame Wizard does his worst to all the students, turning them against each other.
19	9	"Smooch or Share"	Joel Moser	Alex Rubens	October 5, 2018
(Part 2 of 3) To take their minds off the Shame Wizard, Nick suggests they play a variation on the game of Truth or Dare. Meanwhile, the Shame Wizard meets his match with the dimwitted Coach Steve. And lastly, Jessi starts to question her life after everything that has happened.
20	10	"The Department of Puberty"	Bob Suarez	Gil Ozeri	October 5, 2018
(Part 3 of 3) Jessi, having had enough of Connie, escapes to the Department of Puberty, where she becomes trapped by the Depression Kitty. The other kids come to her rescue. Meanwhile, after his kiss with Matthew, Jay questions the possibility of his bisexuality.

== Reception ==
=== Critical response ===
On Rotten Tomatoes, the second season has an approval rating of 100% based on 33 reviews, with an average rating of 8.80 out of 10. The website's critics consensus reads "Poignantly repulsive, Big Mouth continues to confront the awkwardness of adolescence with foul-mouthed glee and an added layer of maturity." On Metacritic, it has a score of 90 out of 100 for the second season, based on nine critics, indicating "universal acclaim".

=== Accolades ===
Year	Award	Category	Nominee(s)	Result	Ref.
2019	Annie Awards	Best General Audience Television/Broadcast Production	Big Mouth (for "The Planned Parenthood Show")	Nominated	
2019	Annie Awards	Outstanding Achievement for Writing in an Animated Television/Broadcast Production	Emily Altman	Nominated	
2019	MTV Movie & TV Awards	Best Show	Big Mouth	Nominated	
2019	MTV Movie & TV Awards	Best Comedic Performance	John Mulaney	Nominated	
2019	Primetime Emmy Awards	Outstanding Animated Program	Big Mouth (for "The Planned Parenthood Show")	Nominated	
