= Big Mouth season 1 =

Season of television series

Big Mouth
- Season 1
- Season 1 promotional poster
- Starring: Nick Kroll; John Mulaney; Jessi Klein; Jason Mantzoukas; Jenny Slate; Fred Armisen; Maya Rudolph; Jordan Peele
- No. of episodes: 10

Release
- Original network: Netflix
- Original release: September 29, 2017

Season chronology
- Next → Season 2

The first season of Big Mouth, an American adult animated coming-of-age sitcom created by Andrew Goldberg, Nick Kroll, Mark Levin, and Jennifer Flackett, premiered on Netflix on September 29, 2017. The series centers on teens based on Kroll and Goldberg's upbringing in suburban New York, with Kroll voicing his fictional younger self. Big Mouth explores puberty while "embrac[ing] a frankness about the human body and sex."

== Cast and characters ==
=== Main ===
- Nick Kroll as Nick Birch, Maurice the Hormone Monster, Steve Coach, Rick the Hormone Monster, Lola, the Statue of Liberty, a profane ladybug, Joe Walsh, the ghosts of Picasso and Richard Burton, Sylvester Stallone and a webcam girl
- John Mulaney as Andrew Glouberman, Mint, Babe the Blue Ox, and Detective Florez
- Jessi Klein as Jessi Glaser
- Jason Mantzoukas as Jay Bilzerian, Guy Bilzerian and Socrates.
- Jenny Slate as Missy Foreman-Greenwald, Ms. Razz and Fake Missy.
- Fred Armisen as Elliot Birch, the ghost of Antonin Scalia and a bus driver
- Maya Rudolph as Diane Birch, Connie the Hormone Monstress, a Bath Mat, the Ghosts of Elizabeth Taylor, Whitney Houston and Pornscape Residents
- Jordan Peele as the Ghost of Duke Ellington (1899–1974), Featuring Ludacris, the ghosts of Freddie Mercury and Prince, Atlanta Claus, a DJ, and Missy's father Cyrus

=== Recurring ===
- Andrew Rannells as Matthew MacDell
- Paula Pell as Barbara Glouberman
- Richard Kind as Marty Glouberman and a Scammer
- Seth Morris as Greg Glaser and a Ninth Grader
- Jessica Chaffin as Shannon Glaser
- June Diane Raphael as Devin
- Jak Knight as DeVon
- Neil Casey as Lars, Detective Dumont and the Pornscape Residents
- Joe Wengert as Caleb, Mr. Albert, Go-Gurt Thief, Teacher
- Jon Daly as Judd Birch, Garrison Keillor, Magician #1
- Kat Dennings as Leah Birch
- Chelsea Peretti as Monica Foreman-Greenwald

=== Guest ===
- Heather Lawless as Jenna "Jay's Mom" Bilzerian
- Mark Duplass and Paul Scheer as Val and Kurt Bilzerian
- Nathan Fillion as himself
- Rob Huebel as Mr. Terry Lizer
- Kristen Bell as Pam and an uninterested girl.
- Jack McBrayer and Craig Robinson as Nick's pubic hairs
- Rosa Salazar as Miss Benitez
- Michaela Watkins as Cantor Dina Reznick
- Zach Woods as Daniel
- Alia Shawkat as Roland
- Kristen Wiig as Jessi's vulva
- Jess Harnell as Dwayne Johnson
- Mae Whitman as Tallulah Levine
- Jon Hamm as a plate of Scallops

== Episodes ==
No. overall	No. in season	Title	Directed by	Written by	Original release date
1	1	"Ejaculation"	Joel Moser	Nick Kroll, Andrew Goldberg, Jennifer Flackett & Mark Levin	September 29, 2017
The days before the Bridgeton Middle School dance, Nick Birch accidentally sees his best friend Andrew Glouberman's penis and attempts to avoid telling Andrew about it. Jealous of Andrew's penis, Nick fights with Andrew and believes he is taking an older girl to the dance, until she turns him down and embarrasses him at the dance. Andrew's Hormone Monster won't leave him alone, and convinces him to masturbate at inappropriate times. Jessi tells Nick that she likes him, and the two have their first kiss together. Nick and Andrew reconcile at the end of the dance. Later, at a new sleepover, Nick sees Andrew's Hormone Monster (who insists he is not a "puberty fairy") leaving his room, whom Andrew had originally assumed to be his imaginary friend.
2	2	"Everybody Bleeds"	Bryan Francis	Kelly Galuska	September 29, 2017
On a school trip to the Statue of Liberty, Jessi Glaser gets her period. Meanwhile, Nick and Jessi attempt to enjoy the perks of being a couple.
3	3	"Am I Gay?"	Mike L. Mayfield	Joe Wengert	September 29, 2017
A trailer for the latest Dwayne Johnson movie has Andrew questioning his sexual orientation. Meanwhile, Jessi and Nick break up.
4	4	"Sleepover: A Harrowing Ordeal of Emotional Brutality"	Joel Moser	Jess Dweck & Victor Quinaz	September 29, 2017
Nick and Andrew sleep over at their weird magician friend, Jay Bilzarian's house. Meanwhile, Jessi and Missy Foreman-Greenwald have a sleepover with popular girls Devin and Lola.
5	5	"Girls Are Horny Too"	Bryan Francis	Emily Altman	September 29, 2017
For a school book report, a popular romance novel becomes trendy among the middle schoolers, and even Andrew's romantically challenged parents. Meanwhile, inspired by the book, Jessi decides to get a new bra.
6	6	"Pillow Talk"	Mike L. Mayfield	Peter A. Knight	September 29, 2017
Jay stays home from school when the pillow he has intercourse with, Pam, becomes pregnant. Meanwhile, Nick and Andrew play hooky to visit Nick's girl friend from camp in the city.
7	7	"Requiem for a Wet Dream"	Joel Moser	Duffy Boudreau	September 29, 2017
During preparations for the science fair, Andrew and Missy start to go out. Meanwhile, Jessi and Matthew, the school's resident gay kid, decide to do their project on how sad Jay's life is as a magician.
8	8	"The Head Push"	Bryan Francis	Emily Altman, Jennifer Flackett & Mark Levin	September 29, 2017
At a high school play cast party, Jay brings some kid booze and Nick attempts to hook up with an older girl.
9	9	"I Survived Jessi's Bat Mitzvah"	Mike L. Mayfield	Kelly Galuska	September 29, 2017
Tensions are high at Jessi's bat mitzvah.
10	10	"The Pornscape"	Joel Moser	Gil Ozeri	September 29, 2017
Andrew finds his way in the land of internet porn. Meanwhile, Jessi and Jay decide to become runaways.

== Reception ==
=== Critical response ===
Big Mouth has received critical acclaim since its release. On Rotten Tomatoes, the first season has an approval rating of 100% based on 23 reviews, with an average rating of 8.10 out of 10. The website's critics consensus reads, "Big Mouth's simplistic animation and scatological humor belie its finely sketched characters and smart, empathetic approach to the messiness of adolescence." On Metacritic, it holds a rating of 80 out of 100, based on six critics, indicating "generally favorable reviews".

=== Accolades ===
Year	Award	Category	Nominee(s)	Result	Ref.
2018	Annie Awards	Best General Audience Television/Broadcast Production	Big Mouth (for "Am I Gay?")	Nominated	
2018	Primetime Emmy Awards	Outstanding Original Music and Lyrics	Mark Rivers (for "Totally Gay")	Nominated	
