= Big Mouth season 4 =

Season of television series

Big Mouth
- Season 4
- Season 4 promotional poster
- Starring: Nick Kroll; John Mulaney; Jessi Klein; Jason Mantzoukas; Jenny Slate; Ayo Edebiri; Fred Armisen; Maya Rudolph; Jordan Peele
- No. of episodes: 10

Release
- Original network: Netflix
- Original release: December 4, 2020

Season chronology
- ← Previous; Season 3 Next → Season 5

The fourth season of Big Mouth, an American adult animated coming-of-age sitcom created by Andrew Goldberg, Nick Kroll, Mark Levin, and Jennifer Flackett, was released on Netflix on December 4, 2020. The series centers on teens based on Kroll and Goldberg's upbringing in suburban New York, with Kroll voicing his fictional younger self. Big Mouth explores puberty while "embrac[ing] a frankness about the human body and sex."

== Cast and characters ==
=== Main ===
- Nick Kroll as Nick Birch, Maurice the Hormone Monster, Coach Steve Steve, Lola Skumpy and Nick Starr
  - Kroll also voices Mila and Lotte Jensen, Rabbi Paulblart, Mark, and Bad Mitten
- John Mulaney as Andrew Glouberman
  - Mulaney also voices Andrew 3000 and Detective Florez
- Jessi Klein as Jessi Glaser
- Jason Mantzoukas as Jay Bilzerian
- Jenny Slate and Ayo Edebiri as Missy Foreman-Greenwald
  - Slate also voices Mirror Missy, Caitlyn, Vicky and others
  - Edebiri also voices Mosaic Missy
- Fred Armisen as Elliot Birch
- Maya Rudolph as Connie the Hormone Monstress and Diane Birch
  - Rudolph also voices Gayle King and Paula
- Jordan Peele as Ghost of Duke Ellington, Featuring Ludacris, Cyrus Forman-Greenwald
  - Peele also voices Sinbad

=== Recurring ===
- Andrew Rannells as Matthew MacDell
- Paula Pell as Barbara Glouberman
- Richard Kind as Marty Glouberman
- Seth Morris as Greg Glaser
- Jessica Chaffin as Shannon Glaser
- Mark Duplass and Paul Scheer as Val and Kurt Bilzerian
  - Scheer also voices a Gap-Toothed Camper
- Jon Daly as Judd Birch
  - Daly also voices Jesus Christ
- Kat Dennings as Leah Birch
- June Diane Raphael as Devin
- Jak Knight as DeVon
- Joe Wengert as Caleb and Lump Humpman
- Fran Gillespie as Samira
- Thandiwe Newton as Mona
- Maria Bamford as Tito Taylor Thomas the Anxiety Mosquito
  - Bamford also voices Nancy, Jessi's therapist.
- Jean Smart as Kitty Bouchet the Depression Kitty
- Seth Rogen as Seth Goldberg
- Alia Shawkat as Roland
- Emily Altman as "Milk"
- Zachary Quinto as Aiden
- Josie Totah as Natalie el-Khoury
- Chelsea Peretti as Monica Foreman-Greenwald
- Gina Rodriguez as Gina Alvarez
- Ali Wong as Ali
- Gary Cole as Edward MacDell
- Julie White as Kimberly MacDell
- Gil Ozeri as Brad and Additional Voices
- Zach Galifianakis as the Gratitoad ^{[4]}
- Sterling K. Brown^{[4]} as Michael Angelo

=== Guest ===
- Heather Lawless as Jenna "Jay's Mom" Bilzerian
- Natasha Lyonne as Suzette
  - Lyonne also voices Nadia Vulvokov
- John Oliver as Harry
- Somali Rose as Missy's overalls
- Lena Waithe as Lena^{[4]}
- Quinta Brunson as Quinta
- Paul Giamatti^{[4]} as Andrew's fece
- Kristen Wiig as Jessi's vulva
- Maya Erskine and Anna Konkle as Misha and Izzy
- David Thewlis as Lionel St. Swithens
- Julie Klausner as Cherry Marashina, formerly Cheryl Glouberman
- Judd Hirsch as Lewis Glouberman
- David Cross as Skip Glouberman
- Rosa Salazar as Miss Benitez
- Michaela Watkins as Cantor Dina Reznick
- Harvey Fierstein as Jerome

== Episodes ==
No. overall	No. in season	Title	Directed by	Written by	Original release date
32	1	"The New Me"	Andres Salaff	Story by : Andrew Goldberg & Patti Harrison; Teleplay by : Andrew Goldberg	December 4, 2020
Nick arrives at camp and meets up with his friend Seth Goldberg. Their cabin meets Natalie, a former member of their cabin who has transitioned. The boys all make her uncomfortable and she ends up switching to a girl's bunk. There, the girls all treat her weirdly and Jessi hates her until she realizes she is all alone and the two become friends. Andrew arrives at camp after his parents drop him off and Nick attempts to make him jealous until Seth and Andrew become friends. Nick starts feeling left out as the two of them are hanging out more. Eventually, he breaks down and runs into the forest where he has a panic attack and is bitten by an Anxiety Mosquito named Tito.
33	2	"The Hugest Period Ever"	Bryan Francis	Kelly Galuska	December 4, 2020
After a disastrous morning of showering with the boys, Nick decides to hold off on showering. Meanwhile, Jessi gets another period at camp and learns how to insert tampons. Meanwhile, Missy and her parents travel to Atlanta to visit her cousins, who help Missy embrace her Black identity.
34	3	"Poop Madness"	Dave Stone	Gil Ozeri	December 4, 2020
On the last day of camp, Nick bombs at the talent show, Andrew deals with constipation, and Seth and Natalie hook up. Back in Westchester, Jay and Lola invite their friends to a pool-warming party.
35	4	"Cafeteria Girls"	Andres Salaff	Emily Altman	December 4, 2020
On the first day of the eighth grade, Nick and Andrew try to hook up with two seventh-grade girls. In New York City, Jessi is having trouble adjusting to her new school.
36	5	"A Very Special 9/11 Episode"	Bryan Francis	Jak Knight	December 4, 2020
The kids at Bridgeton Middle go on a field trip to the National September 11 Memorial & Museum. Nick and Andrew ditch the trip to meet up with Jessi and her new boyfriend, Michael Angelo. Matthew decides to mess with Coach Steve, whose birthday happens to also be on September 11, but feels bad after Coach Steve learns about the attacks. Missy and DeVon also ditch the trip to meet with her cousin Lena, as DeVon teaches Missy about code-switching.
37	6	"Nick Starr"	Dave Stone	Victor Quinaz	December 4, 2020
In the year 2052, Nick is now a successful game show host in a dystopian Earth, with only a robotic assistant modeled on Andrew as company. Shaken by the news of Missy's death, Nick is given two passes for a space ark as the planet will be ending the next day. After going through old contacts, he picks Jessi to join him, now an activist protesting for the downtrodden. While on his way to the funeral, Nick crashes on a street and is taken by Jay to his childhood home, where he and Lola run a sex cult and have Nick's parents as sex slaves. At the funeral for Missy, Nick approaches Jessi, who agrees to go with him. The two flee when a recorded message from Missy plays, revealing that she was murdered and the existence of the space ark. After making their way through angry mobs and wasteland riders, the two proceed to the ark and have sex as the planet is destroyed. However, Nick is unable to perform, and Jessi reveals that she only played him to get access to the ship and destroy it. As Jessi blows up the ship, Nick escapes in a spacesuit with Tito, the anxiety mosquito. However, the entire episode is then revealed as an anxiety dream Nick has on the bus from the previous episode.
38	7	"Four Stories About Hand Stuff"	Andres Salaff	Mitra Jouhari & Brandon Kyle Goodman	December 4, 2020
After being upset from their exclusion from the previous episode, Maury and Connie watch four different stories about giving hand jobs.: "Touched by a Jay-ngel": Rumors fly that DeVon divorced Devin because he would not give her a hand job. After a poor attempt, Jay asks Lola to guide him through his hand job.; "The Hand M-Aiden's Tale": Matthew hangs with Aiden's friends, and Maury suggests Matthew give Aiden a hand job.; "The Glouberman Method": Nick is unimpressed with Andrew's Bob Fosse-esque method of masturbation, so Andrew decides to masturbate without the method, only to get some sad news.; "Blue Balls": Michael Angelo tells Jessi to give him a hand job to satisfy his blue balls, but when Jessi sees Michael Angelo's penis, she laughs, and they break up.
39	8	"The Funeral"	Bryan Francis	Joe Wengert	December 4, 2020
Andrew and his friends attend a funeral for Andrew's zayde, whom Andrew still believes died because he did not masturbate right. Nick wants to tell Jessi about his dream. Meanwhile, Matthew's mother accidentally sees his phone and discovers he is gay and excludes him from the church cook-off. As revenge, Matthew and Aiden decide to compete in the cook-off.
40	9	"Horrority House"	Dave Stone	Emily Altman & Victor Quinaz	December 4, 2020
On Halloween night, the gang goes to a haunted sorority house, where they become the victims of a trippy hazing, despite being underaged and not students at their university. Jay tells Lola that he loves her, but Lola does not reciprocate, which upsets Jay.
41	10	"What Are You Gonna Do?"	Andres Salaff	Gil Ozeri	December 4, 2020
Following the events of the previous episode, Nick's body has been taken over by his darker future self "Nick Starr", who proceeds to push away his friends with his behavior, leaving the present Nick as a "lost soul" in ghostly limbo with Duke. Meanwhile, Matthew comes out to his father, who admits that he had always known and accepts him and comforts him by saying his mother will understand in time. After an attempt to force Starr out of his body fails, Nick manages to recruit Andrew and Missy in a mission to jump into his body and force out Starr. The battle in Nick's mind becomes devastating, with a giant Anxiety Mosquito on Starr's side, with a kaiju-style battle with the Gratitoad (brought by Jessi) but eventually, Starr is defeated, and a scared version of Nick within combines with the real Nick to become one. After this, Rick the Hormone Monster ends the episode with a musical number.

== Reception ==
=== Critical response ===
On Rotten Tomatoes, the fourth season has an approval rating of 100% based on 22 reviews, with an average rating of 8.30 out of 10. The website's critics consensus reads, "Big Mouth's fourth season is another tour de force of empathetic cringe comedy that manages to get even better by finally giving Missy the storyline she deserves." On Metacritic, it has a score of 84 out of 100 for the third season, based on five critics, indicating "universal acclaim".

=== Accolades ===
Year	Award	Category	Nominee(s)	Result	Ref.
2021	Critics' Choice Super Awards	Best Animated Series	Big Mouth	Nominated	
2021	Critics' Choice Super Awards	Best Voice Actor in an Animated Series	Nick Kroll	Nominated	
2021	Critics' Choice Super Awards	Best Voice Actor in an Animated Series	John Mulaney	Nominated	
2021	Critics' Choice Super Awards	Best Voice Actress in an Animated Series	Maya Rudolph	Nominated	
2021	GLAAD Media Awards	Outstanding Comedy Series	Big Mouth	Nominated	
2021	Annie Awards	Outstanding Achievement for Writing in an Animated Television/Broadcast Production	Andrew Goldberg and Patti Harrison	Won	
2021	American Cinema Editors Awards	Best Edited Animation (Non-Theatrical)	Felipe Salazar (for "Nick Starr")	Nominated	
2021	Casting Society of America Awards	Television Animation	Julie Ashton	Won	
2021	NAACP Image Awards	Outstanding Animated Series	Big Mouth	Nominated	
2021	Hollywood Critics Association TV Awards	Best Animated Series or Animated Television Movie	Big Mouth	Nominated	
2021	Primetime Emmy Awards	Outstanding Animated Program	Big Mouth (for "The New Me")	Nominated	
2021	Primetime Emmy Awards	Outstanding Character Voice-Over Performance	Maya Rudolph as Connie the Hormone Monstress	Won	
