= Get the Fuck Out of My House (disambiguation) =

Get the F*ck Out of My House is a Dutch television show.

Get the Fuck Out of My House may also refer to:

- "Get the Fuck Out of My House", a song by 2 Live Crew from As Nasty as They Wanna Be
- "Get the F**k Outta My House", an episode of American TV series Big Mouth
