= List of Big Mouth episodes =

Big Mouth is an American adult animated coming-of-age sitcom created by Andrew Goldberg, Nick Kroll, Mark Levin, and Jennifer Flackett for Netflix. The series centers on teens based on Kroll and Goldberg's upbringing in suburban New York, with Kroll voicing his fictional younger self. Big Mouth explores puberty while "embrac[ing] a frankness about the human body and sex". The series premiered on Netflix on September 29, 2017, and concluded on May 23, 2025.

In July 2019, Netflix renewed the series through to a sixth season. In April 2022, Netflix gave a seventh season order ahead of its sixth season, with the sixth season having been released on October 28, 2022. In April 2023, Netflix renewed the series for an eighth and final season. The eighth season was released on May 23, 2025.

During the course of the series, 81 episodes of Big Mouth were released over eight seasons, between September 29, 2017, and May 23, 2025.

== Series overview ==
Season	Episodes		Originally released
1	10		September 29, 2017
2	10		October 5, 2018
3	11	1	February 8, 2019
3	11	10	October 4, 2019
4	10		December 4, 2020
5	10		November 5, 2021
6	10		October 28, 2022
7	10		October 20, 2023
8	10		May 23, 2025

== Episodes ==
=== Season 1 (2017) ===
No. overall	No. in season	Title	Directed by	Written by	Original release date
1	1	"Ejaculation"	Joel Moser	Nick Kroll, Andrew Goldberg, Jennifer Flackett & Mark Levin	September 29, 2017
2	2	"Everybody Bleeds"	Bryan Francis	Kelly Galuska	September 29, 2017
3	3	"Am I Gay?"	Mike L. Mayfield	Joe Wengert	September 29, 2017
4	4	"Sleepover: A Harrowing Ordeal of Emotional Brutality"	Joel Moser	Jess Dweck & Victor Quinaz	September 29, 2017
5	5	"Girls Are Horny Too"	Bryan Francis	Emily Altman	September 29, 2017
6	6	"Pillow Talk"	Mike L. Mayfield	Peter A. Knight	September 29, 2017
7	7	"Requiem for a Wet Dream"	Joel Moser	Duffy Boudreau	September 29, 2017
8	8	"The Head Push"	Bryan Francis	Emily Altman, Jennifer Flackett & Mark Levin	September 29, 2017
9	9	"I Survived Jessi's Bat Mitzvah"	Mike L. Mayfield	Kelly Galuska	September 29, 2017
10	10	"The Pornscape"	Joel Moser	Gil Ozeri	September 29, 2017

=== Season 2 (2018) ===
No. overall	No. in season	Title	Directed by	Written by	Original release date
11	1	"Am I Normal?"	Bob Suarez	Andrew Goldberg	October 5, 2018
12	2	"What Is It About Boobs?"	Bryan Francis	Kelly Galuska	October 5, 2018
13	3	"The Shame Wizard"	Joel Moser	Victor Quinaz	October 5, 2018
14	4	"Steve the Virgin"	Bob Suarez	Joe Wengert	October 5, 2018
15	5	"The Planned Parenthood Show"	Bryan Francis	Emily Altman	October 5, 2018
16	6	"Drug Buddies"	Joel Moser	Gil Ozeri	October 5, 2018
17	7	"Guy Town"	Bob Suarez	Joe Wengert	October 5, 2018
18	8	"Dark Side of the Boob"	Bryan Francis	Kelly Galuska	October 5, 2018
19	9	"Smooch or Share"	Joel Moser	Alex Rubens	October 5, 2018
20	10	"The Department of Puberty"	Bob Suarez	Gil Ozeri	October 5, 2018

=== Season 3 (2019) ===
No. overall	No. in season	Title	Directed by	Written by	Original release date
21	1	"My Furry Valentine"	Kim Arndt & Bob Suarez	Story by : Andrew Goldberg, Jennifer Flackett & Joe Wengert; Teleplay by : Emily Altman & Victor Quinaz	February 8, 2019
21	1	"My Furry Valentine"	Kim Arndt & Bob Suarez	Story by : Nick Kroll, Mark Levin & Kelly Galuska; Teleplay by : Gil Ozeri & Jaboukie Young-White	February 8, 2019
22	2	"Girls Are Angry Too"	Bob Suarez	Hayley Adams, JoEllen Redlingshafer & Kelsey Cressman	October 4, 2019
23	3	"Cellsea"	Bryan Francis	Joe Wengert	October 4, 2019
24	4	"Obsessed"	Joel Moser	Kelly Galuska & Jaboukie Young-White	October 4, 2019
25	5	"Florida"	Kim Arndt	Victor Quinaz	October 4, 2019
26	6	"How To Have An Orgasm"	Bob Suarez	Emily Altman	October 4, 2019
27	7	"Duke"	Bryan Francis	Gil Ozeri & Jak Knight	October 4, 2019
28	8	"Rankings"	Joel Moser	Kelly Galuska	October 4, 2019
29	9	"The ASSes"	Kim Arndt	Joe Wengert & Max Silvestri	October 4, 2019
30	10	"Disclosure the Movie: The Musical!"	Bob Suarez	Emily Altman & Victor Quinaz	October 4, 2019
31	11	"Super Mouth"	Bryan Francis & Mike L. Mayfield	Gil Ozeri	October 4, 2019

=== Season 4 (2020) ===
No. overall	No. in season	Title	Directed by	Written by	Original release date
32	1	"The New Me"	Andres Salaff	Story by : Andrew Goldberg & Patti Harrison; Teleplay by : Andrew Goldberg	December 4, 2020
33	2	"The Hugest Period Ever"	Bryan Francis	Kelly Galuska	December 4, 2020
34	3	"Poop Madness"	Dave Stone	Gil Ozeri	December 4, 2020
35	4	"Cafeteria Girls"	Andres Salaff	Emily Altman	December 4, 2020
36	5	"A Very Special 9/11 Episode"	Bryan Francis	Jak Knight	December 4, 2020
37	6	"Nick Starr"	Dave Stone	Victor Quinaz	December 4, 2020
38	7	"Four Stories About Hand Stuff"	Andres Salaff	Mitra Jouhari & Brandon Kyle Goodman	December 4, 2020
39	8	"The Funeral"	Bryan Francis	Joe Wengert	December 4, 2020
40	9	"Horrority House"	Dave Stone	Emily Altman & Victor Quinaz	December 4, 2020
41	10	"What Are You Gonna Do?"	Andres Salaff	Gil Ozeri	December 4, 2020

=== Season 5 (2021) ===
No. overall	No. in season	Title	Directed by	Written by	Original release date
42	1	"No Nut November"	Bryan Francis	Gil Ozeri	November 5, 2021
43	2	"The Shane Lizard Rises"	Andres Salaff	Emily Altman & Victor Quinaz	November 5, 2021
44	3	"Lovebugs"	Henrique Jardim	Kelly Galuska	November 5, 2021
45	4	"The Green-Eyed Monster"	Bryan Francis	Joe Wengert	November 5, 2021
46	5	"Thanksgiving"	Andres Salaff	Brandon Kyle Goodman	November 5, 2021
47	6	"Best Friends Make the Best Lovers"	Henrique Jardim	Mitra Jouhari	November 5, 2021
48	7	"I F**king Hate You"	Bryan Francis	Jak Knight	November 5, 2021
49	8	"A Very Big Mouth Christmas"	Henrique Jardim	Joe Wengert & Emily Altman	November 5, 2021
50	9	"Sugarbush"	Andres Salaff	Victor Quinaz	November 5, 2021
51	10	"Re-New Year's Eve"	Bryan Francis	Gil Ozeri	November 5, 2021

=== Season 6 (2022) ===
No. overall	No. in season	Title	Directed by	Written by	Original release date
52	1	"The Hookup House"	Bryan L Francis	Gil Ozeri	October 28, 2022
53	2	"Twenty Two and You"	Alex Salyer	Joe Wengert	October 28, 2022
54	3	"Vagina Shame"	Henrique Jardim	Emily Altman	October 28, 2022
55	4	"Rice Purity Test"	Bryan L Francis	Victor Quinaz	October 28, 2022
56	5	"Andrew's Gonna Touch A Boob Tonight"	Alex Salyer	L.E. Correia	October 28, 2022
57	6	"The Apple Brooch"	Henrique Jardim	Kelsey Krasnigor	October 28, 2022
58	7	"Dadda Dia!"	Bryan L Francis	Gabe Liedman	October 28, 2022
59	8	"Asexual Healing"	Alex Salyer	Shantira Jackson	October 28, 2022
60	9	"The Parents Aren't Alright"	Henrique Jardim	Kelly Galuska	October 28, 2022
61	10	"F**ked Up Friday"	Bryan L Francis	Gil Ozeri	October 28, 2022

=== Season 7 (2023) ===
No. overall	No. in season	Title	Directed by	Written by	Original release date
62	1	"Big Mouth's Going to High School (But Not for Nine More Episodes)"	Chris Ybarra	Victor Quinaz	October 20, 2023
63	2	"Epididymitis"	Paul Scarlata	Joe Wengert	October 20, 2023
64	3	"The Ambition Gremlin"	Bryan L Francis	L.E. Correia	October 20, 2023
65	4	"Day Tripping"	Henrique Jardim	Peter Kelly	October 20, 2023
66	5	"Graduation"	Alex Salyer	Brandon Kyle Goodman	October 20, 2023
67	6	"The International Show"	Alex Salyer	Victor Quinaz, Jess Dweck & Brandon Kyle Goodman	October 20, 2023
68	7	"Get the F**k Outta My House"	Chris Ybarra	Shantira Jackson	October 20, 2023
69	8	"The Bad Hookup"	Paul Scarlata	Fran Gillespie	October 20, 2023
70	9	"Panic! At the Mall"	Bryan L Francis	Joe Wengert & Augustus Schiff	October 20, 2023
71	10	"A Finger in Time"	Henrique Jardim	Gil Ozeri	October 20, 2023

=== Season 8 (2025) ===
No. overall	No. in season	Title	Directed by	Written by	Original release date
72	1	"Homecumming"	Henrique Jardim	Andrew Goldberg	May 23, 2025
73	2	"Cliques, Pricks, and Sonic’s Dick"	Henrique Jardim	Mitra Jouhari	May 23, 2025
74	3	"Why Do We Go Through Puberty?"	Paul Scarlata	Victor Quinaz	May 23, 2025
75	4	"Lola Skumpy: License to Drive"	Ross Bradley	Jess Dweck	May 23, 2025
76	5	"Am I Smoking Too Much Weed?"	Alex Salyer	L.E. Correia	May 23, 2025
77	6	"Everyone Watches Porn"	Henrique Jardim	Walter Kelly & Jasmine Pierce	May 23, 2025
78	7	"Have Some Goddamn Compassion"	Paul Scarlata	Kelly Galuska	May 23, 2025
79	8	"Horny Talky Yes Please"	Ross Bradley	Joe Wengert	May 23, 2025
80	9	"Everything We Forgot to Tell You About Sex"	Alex Salyer	Emily Altman & Peter Kelly	May 23, 2025
81	10	"The Great Unknown"	Henrique Jardim	Gil Ozeri	May 23, 2025
