= It's Always Sunny in Philadelphia season 6 =

2010 season of American television series

It's Always Sunny in Philadelphia
- Season 6
- DVD cover
- Starring: Charlie Day; Glenn Howerton; Rob McElhenney; Kaitlin Olson; Danny DeVito
- No. of episodes: 14

Release
- Original network: FX
- Original release: September 16 – December 16, 2010

Season chronology
- ← Previous; Season 5 Next → Season 7

The sixth season of the American television sitcom series It's Always Sunny in Philadelphia premiered on FX on September 16, 2010. It is the first season of the show to be filmed in high-definition. The season contains 14 episodes and concluded airing on December 16, 2010, with the hour-long Christmas special (which was produced for season 5, however aired as part of season 6). An additional episode called "The Gang Gets Successful" (production code IP06004) was produced for this season, but was not aired, despite scenes from the episode being included in promotional material for season 6. It was later re-edited with new scenes to create the season 7 episode "How Mac Got Fat".

== Cast ==
=== Main cast ===
- Charlie Day as Charlie Kelly
- Glenn Howerton as Dennis Reynolds
- Rob McElhenney as Ronald "Mac" McDonald
- Kaitlin Olson as Deandra "Dee" ("Sweet Dee") Reynolds
- Danny DeVito as Frank Reynolds

=== Special guest cast ===
- René Auberjonois as Dr. Larry Meyers
- Dave Foley as Principal MacIntyre

=== Recurring cast ===
- Mary Elizabeth Ellis as The Waitress
- David Hornsby as Matthew "Cricket" ("Rickety Cricket") Mara
- Artemis Pebdani as Artemis
- Lance Barber as Bill Ponderosa

=== Guest stars ===
- Brittany Daniel as Carmen
- Catherine Reitman as Maureen Ponderosa
- Windell Middlebrooks as Nick
- Andrew Friedman as Jack Kelly
- Brian Unger as Attorney
- Seth Morris as Ted Sally
- Don Swayze as Ray
- Preston Elliott as himself
- Steve Morrison as himself
- Travis Schuldt as Ben the Soldier
- Regan Burns as Swim Club Manager
- Lynne Marie Stewart as Bonnie Kelly
- Sandy Martin as Mrs. Mac
- Jimmi Simpson as Liam McPoyle
- Nate Mooney as Ryan McPoyle
- Thesy Surface as Margaret McPoyle
- Michael Trotter as Eric
- Jason Sudeikis as Schmitty
- Paul Walter Hauser as Richie
- Chad L. Coleman as Z
- Tom Sizemore as Trucker
- Ryan Howard as himself
- Chase Utley as himself
- Cleo King as Nurse Wendy
- Kyle Davis as Lil' Kev
- T.J. Hoban as Rex
- David Huddleston as Eugene Hamilton
- Gregory Scott Cummins as Luther Mac
- Pablo Schreiber as Ricky Falcone
- Ryan Michelle Bathe as Woman Office Worker
- Mike Beaver as Man Office Worker
- Derek Waters as Toy Store Clerk
- Mark Povinelli as Tiny

== Episodes ==
No. overall	No. in season	Title	Directed by	Written by	Original release date	Prod. code	US viewers (millions)
58	1	"Mac Fights Gay Marriage"	Randall Einhorn	Becky Mann & Audra Sielaff	September 16, 2010	XIP06005	2.21
Hearing that Carmen (the trans woman he met in "Charlie Has Cancer" and secretly dated in "Mac Is a Serial Killer") has finished her gender-affirming operations and is married to a man, Mac protests against gay marriage, although everyone else thinks he's jealous that Carmen didn't marry him and that he might be gay because he slept with her before her gender-reassignment. Meanwhile, Dennis marries his high-school crush, whom everyone else hates because of her bad breath caused by a dead tooth; Dee spends time with her crush; and Charlie and Frank marry each other to get health benefits.
59	2	"Dennis Gets Divorced"	Randall Einhorn	Dave Chernin & John Chernin	September 23, 2010	XIP06006	1.68
Disillusioned, Dennis decides to divorce his wife; Charlie and Frank decide to split up; Dee discovers that Bill is cheating on his wife with her.
60	3	"The Gang Buys a Boat"	Randall Einhorn	Charlie Day & Rob McElhenney	September 30, 2010	XIP06001	1.46
The Gang purchases a boat and disagrees on how to use it: Dennis, Mac, and Dee want a party boat, while Charlie and Frank want a shrimp boat.
61	4	"Mac's Big Break"	Randall Einhorn	Rob Rosell	October 7, 2010	XIP06002	1.23
When he correctly answers a trivia question on the radio, Mac wins the chance to take a shot from center ice at a Philadelphia Flyers game for a weekend at the station's beach house. While Charlie trains Mac, Frank, Dennis, Dee take their bar-banter to the Internet with their own podcast.
62	5	"Mac and Charlie: White Trash"	Randall Einhorn	Luvh Rakhe	October 14, 2010	XIP06003	1.48
The Gang tries to get into a fancy upper-class swim club but discover that it is "at capacity"--for them. Dennis and Dee try to convince Charlie and Mac that they are upper-class by pretending that they got into the swim club when they really had to settle with the disgusting public pool. Meanwhile, Mac and Charlie try to fix up their old neighborhood diving pool that is now filled with trash.
63	6	"Mac's Mom Burns Her House Down"	Matt Shakman	Scott Marder & Rob Rosell	October 21, 2010	XIP06008	1.07
Charlie and Mac try to get their mothers to live together in Mrs. Kelly's house after Mrs. Mac burns hers down. When Dee gets sick, Frank tries to take care of her (with Dennis' help) with the ulterior motive that she will take care of him in his old age.
64	7	"Who Got Dee Pregnant?"	Randall Einhorn	Charlie Day & Rob McElhenney	October 28, 2010	XIP06007	1.19
Dee freaks out the Gang when she announces she's pregnant and one of the guys is the father, and they enlist the help of Frank, Artemis, and even the McPoyles to recall their last Halloween party, where Dee claims it happened.
65	8	"The Gang Gets a New Member"	Matt Shakman	David Hornsby	November 4, 2010	XIP06009	1.67
The gang opens a time capsule and tries to make good on the past: Dee takes another shot at acting by visiting her old drama teacher and ends up teaching his unmotivated drama class; Mac, Dennis, and Frank try to get their old gang member Schmitty back into the Gang but Charlie gets jealous of Schmitty trying to replace him so he becomes the janitor at the school Dee is teaching at and claims that they are best friends. Guest stars Jason Sudeikis and Dave Foley.
66	9	"Dee Reynolds: Shaping America's Youth"	Matt Shakman	David Hornsby	November 11, 2010	XIP06010	1.44
Dee continues her new substitute-drama-teacher job and exposes her students to the culture of Paddy's with a field trip to see The Gang's take on the Lethal Weapon series.
67	10	"Charlie Kelly: King of the Rats"	Matt Shakman	Scott Marder & Rob Rosell	November 18, 2010	XIP06011	1.69
Keeping the basement rodent-free drives Charlie to the brink, so Frank encourages The Gang to throw him a surprise party; they get into a frightening situation with "bridge people" and scrap Frank's plans, and use Charlie's "dream book" to plan the party.
68	11	"The Gang Gets Stranded in the Woods"	Matt Shakman	Story by : Luvh Rakhe; Teleplay by : Scott Marder & Rob Rosell	December 2, 2010	XIP06012	1.65
The gang travels to Atlantic City for a charity benefit. When the car crashes into a tree because they were trying to avoid hitting a squirrel, Mac, Dee, and Frank must survive in the woods while Dennis and Charlie hitch a ride to the city. When they get there they pretend to be Frank and Mac and have the night of their lives flying on a private jet and meeting Chase Utley, a baseball player for the Philadelphia Phillies that Mac had long yearned to meet.
69	12	"Dee Gives Birth"	Matt Shakman	David Hornsby & Becky Mann & Audra Sielaff	December 9, 2010	XIP06013	1.46
Dee's blessed event is fast approaching but the guys still don't know who the father is, so Mac, Charlie, and Frank invite all of Dee's former flings to a party while Dennis stays at the hospital with Dee.
70	13	"A Very Sunny Christmas"	Fred Savage	Charlie Day & Rob McElhenney	December 16, 2010 (Note: This episode is a direct to DVD, Blu-ray and digital download movie. It was released on November 17, 2009, and aired on December 16, 2010 on FX as the last episode of season 6. A video disclaimer on the Blu-ray release indicates it was not filmed in high definition, but was upconverted.)	IP05001	1.16
71	14	"A Very Sunny Christmas"	Fred Savage	Charlie Day & Rob McElhenney	December 16, 2010	IP05002	1.16
Christmas has come to Paddy's Pub, but Mac and Charlie's holiday spirit fades when they learn the truth about their childhood Christmases; Dennis and Dee get back at Frank for ruining their childhood Christmases with a "Christmas Carol"-esque scheme. Eventually The Gang comes together (in a new form) to show what Christmas means to them.

== Reception ==
The sixth season received positive reviews. On Rotten Tomatoes, it has an approval rating of 94% with an average score of 8.3 out of 10 based on 16 reviews. The website's critical consensus reads, "Cleverly folding Kaitlin Olson's real-life pregnancy into the plot with characteristic perversity, It's Always Sunny's sixth season sees the Gang trying – and failing – to grow up."

== Home media ==
It's Always Sunny in Philadelphia: The Complete Season 6
Set details	Special features
12 episodes; 2-disc set (Region 1 & 4); Technical specifications: Anamorphic Widescreen (1.78:1); English Dolby Digital 5.1 (DVD), DTS-HD Master Audio 5.1 (Blu-ray); English SDH, French, Spanish subtitles	Four audio commentaries: "The Gang Buys a Boat" "Who Got Dee Pregnant?" "Charlie Kelly: King of Rats" "The Gang Gets Stranded in the Woods": Two featurettes: Legal Advice with Jack Kelly Dennis and Dee's Podcasts: Wilfred pilot episode; "Lethal Weapon 5" extended cut with optional commentary; Deleted and extended scenes; Blooper reel; Blu-ray exclusive game: "The Sunny Flip Cup Trivia Challenge"
Release dates
Region 1	Region 4
September 13, 2011	March 13, 2013
