= The Adult Swim Golf Classic =

2016 TV special directed by Bill Benz

- Genre: Comedy; Sports
- Written by: Jon Daly
- Directed by: Bill Benz
- Starring: Adam Scott; Jon Daly
- Country of origin: United States
- Original language: English

Production
- Executive producers: Mark Costa; Keith Crofford; Jon Daly; Mike Lazzo
- Producer: Inman Young
- Production locations: Trump National Golf Club, Rancho Palos Verdes, California
- Cinematography: Carl Herse
- Editor: Joe Stakun
- Running time: 24 minutes
- Production companies: J.O.N.; Alive and Kicking, Inc.; Williams Street

Original release
- Network: Adult Swim
- Release: April 8, 2016

The Adult Swim Golf Classic is a 2016 sports comedy television special directed by Bill Benz and written by Jon Daly. Set and filmed at the Trump National Golf Club, Los Angeles in Rancho Palos Verdes, California, the special stars Daly and Adam Scott as professional golfers John Daly and Adam Scott playing against each other in a charity golf event set in 1966. It is based on golf matches televised in the 1960s in programs such as Shell's Wonderful World of Golf.

Sponsored by the fast-food sandwich restaurant chain Arby's, the special was broadcast on Adult Swim on April 8, 2016, and was met with generally favorable reviews.

== Premise ==
In a faux documentary sponsored by Arby's (the real-life sponsor of the special), professional golfers John Daly and Adam Scott (portrayed by actors Jon Daly and Adam Scott, who share the same name as the aforementioned golfers) play against each other in a charity golf event in 1966 at the Trump National Golf Club in Rancho Palos Verdes, California. The prize fund for the tournament was $15,000, with proceeds from the tournament going to the golfers' (and the actors') charity of choice ($10,000 to the winner's charity, $5,000 to the loser's charity and $7,500 to each golfer's charity in the event of a tie).

The faux documentary was hosted by Jim Shea (portrayed by Mel Fair) and analyzed by real-life golf instructor Eddie Merrins and Golf Channel sportscaster Gary Williams.

== Cast ==
- Jon Daly as John Daly. In real life, the golfer Daly has not began his professional golfing career until 1987.
- Adam Scott as Adam Scott. In real life, the golfer Scott wasn't born until 1980. In the special, Scott spoke in an American accent, despite the golfer being Australian.
- Eddie Merrins as himself, one of the analysts of the match.
- Gary Williams as himself, one of the analysts of the match.
- Mel Fair as Jim Shea, the host of the faux broadcast.
- Judilin Bosita as Norita, Daly's Cambodian wife.
- Sabina Gadecki as Poppy, Scott's wife.
- Gregory Hoyt as John Daly's caddie
- Jared Canfield as Adam Scott's caddie
- Stuart Silbar as Arthur Boyce
- John Levenstein as Greenskeeper Levenstein
- Todd Andrews as Darren Lake
- Michael Merrins as Michael Anderson
- Orion McCabe as Bagpiper

== Development and production ==
In an interview with Vulture, writer Jon Daly shared that the special was inspired by Shell's Wonderful World of Golf, a TV program that televises golf matches beginning in the 1960s. Daly was introduced to golf by his father, who is a fan of the sport, and has followed the career of golfer John Daly since he was eleven years old due to the admiration to the golfer's humor and the fact that the actor shares the same name as the golfer. Daly's banter with the golfer began when the actor made a website called jondalyisjohndaly.com, where he would upload photos of himself in a golf course dressed as the golfer Daly in order to subversively take over the golfer's SEO on Google. It was a success, where photos of the actor dressed as the golfer were mixed in with actual photos of the golfer in Google image searches for "John Daly".

Daly pitched the idea to actor Adam Scott during filming for The Secret Life of Walter Mitty (2013), where the two actors starred together.

Production for the special took place in two days at the Trump National Golf Club, Los Angeles in Rancho Palos Verdes, California, one day of just the actors playing golf against each other and trying to win and another day for pick-ups and capturing landscape footage at the golf course. The scores of the match in the special are actual results of the actors playing golf scored by real scorekeepers and featured actual referees and caddies. The prize money for the match was real and it was donated to real-life charities, namely St. Jude Children's Research Hospital (for Scott, who would win the match) and Save the Children (for Daly).

== Broadcast ==
The special was broadcast on Adult Swim on Friday, April 8, 2016, at 11:30 PM ET/PT. Coincidentally, the special was broadcast on the same day as the second round of the 2016 Masters Tournament, where the golfer Adam Scott competed.

An extended version of the special, which ran for an hour and 40 minutes, was released on Adult Swim's website on April 10, 2016.

== Reception ==
The special was praised by critics, with Alex McLevy of The A.V. Club giving it a B+ rating and writing that the half-hour television special "delivers continuous laughs, based almost wholly on one fact: Jon Daly and Adam Scott really suck at golf." Neil Genzlinger of The New York Times wrote that everything about the match is painful to watch, "which makes it hilarious, if you’re in a 19th-hole sort of mood."
