= Bust Down =

American sitcom

- Genre: Comedy
- Created by: Langston Kerman; Jak Knight; Chris Redd; Sam Jay
- Directed by: Richie Keene
- Starring: Chris Redd; Sam Jay; Langston Kerman; Jak Knight
- Country of origin: United States
- Original language: English
- No. of seasons: 1
- No. of episodes: 6

Production
- Executive producers: Langston Kerman; Jak Knight; Chris Redd; Sam Jay; Lorne Michaels; Hilary Marx; Andrew Singer; Richie Keen; Guy Stodel
- Camera setup: Single-camera
- Production companies: Broadway Video; Universal Television

Original release
- Network: Peacock
- Release: March 10, 2022

Bust Down is an American comedy television series co-created by and co-starring Langston Kerman, Jak Knight, Chris Redd, and Sam Jay. The series premiered on Peacock on March 10, 2022.

== Plot ==
The series follows a group of friends working low-wage jobs at a casino in Gary, Indiana.

== Cast ==
- Chris Redd as Chris, a valet
- Sam Jay as Sam, a cook
- Langston Kerman as Langston, a janitor
- Jak Knight as Jak, a stockroom worker
- Phi Tran as Tiki, Sam's sidepiece
- DomiNque Perry as Nina, Sam's girlfriend
- Freddie Gibbs as Chauncey, the casino's HR manager
- John Douglas as Rocko, a velet.

== Production ==
Bust Down was produced by Universal Television and Lorne Michaels' Broadway Video. Michaels was executive producer with Hilary Marx, Andrew Singer, Richie Keen, and Guy Stodel, as well as series creators and stars Langston Kerman, Jak Knight, Chris Redd, and Sam Jay. They described the show as predominantly about friendship and their intention for the show's comedy to be "raunchy, irreverent, and complicated."

The series premiered on Peacock on March 10, 2022. All six episodes were released simultaneously.

== Episodes ==
No.	Title	Directed by	Written by	Original release date
1	"Bad Hang"	Richie Keene	Langston Kerman, Jak Knight, Chris Redd, and Sam Jay	March 10, 2022
2	"Post Nut Promises"	Richie Keene	Langston Kerman	March 10, 2022
3	"Beige Rage"	Richie Keene	Jak Knight	March 10, 2022
4	"Pitching Tent"	Richie Keene	Zack Fox	March 10, 2022
5	"Won't He Do It"	Richie Keene	Gary Richardson	March 10, 2022
6	"Party of Two"	Richie Keene	Emmy Blotnick	March 10, 2022

== Reception ==
The series received mainly positive critical reception. It holds a score of 76/100 on review aggregator Metacritic. Angie Han of The Hollywood Reporter praised Bust Down: "the series’ comic voice is admirably bold — and if you’re left cold by one joke, there are usually three more coming right on its tail." Ebony's Savannah Taylor described the show: "abandoning the appeal of respectability politics and good-mannered humor, this show...is the definition of doing hood rat stuff with your friends" and praised the comedy as "just straight up, raw Black tomfoolery." Richard Roeper rated the series 3/4 stars and hailed the "biting social commentary, some ridiculously effective over-the-top physical shtick and a steady stream of laugh-out-loud moments" but also noted that the show "“will have some viewers bailing within the first 10 minutes of the premiere episode." Nina Metz gave Bust Down 3/4 stars in the Chicago Tribune and called the creators and stars "goofy as hell, but also intelligent and thoughtful and self-aware, which allows them to take on otherwise touchy subject matter."
