= Trump National Golf Club, Los Angeles =

Public golf club in Rancho Palos Verdes, California

Trump National Golf Club (Los Angeles)
- Interactive map of Trump National Golf Club (Los Angeles)
- 33.73°N 118.35°W

Club information
- Location: Rancho Palos Verdes, California, U.S.
- Established: January 20, 2006
- Type: Public
- Owner: The Trump Organization
- Total holes: 18
- Website: trumpnationallosangeles.com
- Designed by: Pete Dye and Donald Trump
- Par: 71
- Length: 7,242-yard (6,622 m)
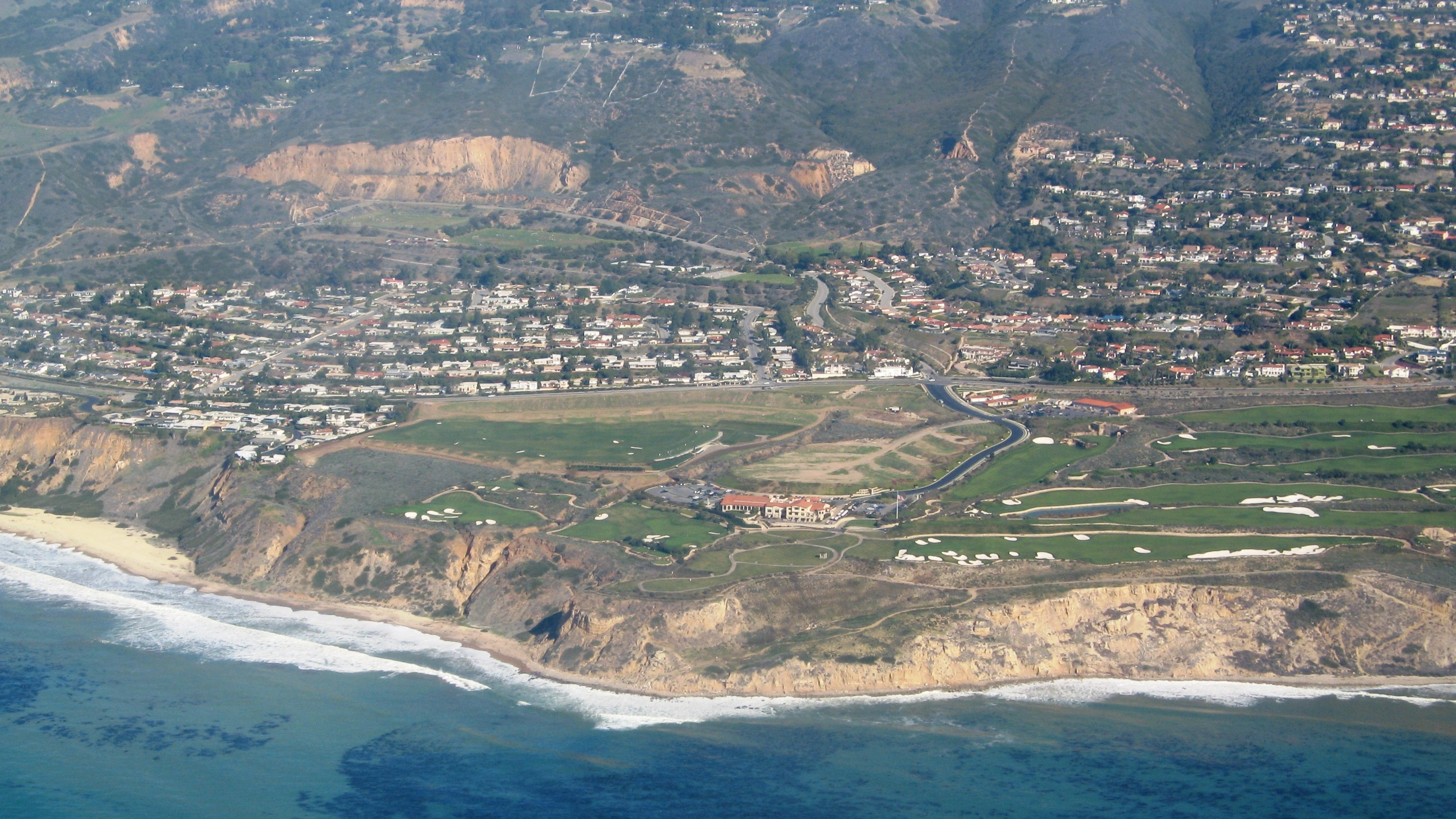
- Aerial view of Trump National Golf Club, Los Angeles in 2010

Trump National Golf Club, Los Angeles is a public golf club in Rancho Palos Verdes, California with a 7,242-yard (6,622 m) course originally designed by Pete Dye, and redesigned by Donald Trump and Tom Fazio. It is owned by The Trump Organization.

Trump National Golf Club Los Angeles was formerly known as Ocean Trails Golf Club, an 18-hole course designed by Dye, which was about to open when a landslide occurred in June 1999, and the 18th hole slid toward the Pacific Ocean. The Ocean Trails Golf Club subsequently went into bankruptcy, and on November 26, 2002, Trump bought the property for $27 million, intending to repair, redesign the course and build homes on adjacent lots. It includes a 45,000 sq ft (4,200 m^{2}) clubhouse.

It is ranked among the Top 100 Courses You Can Play by Golf Magazine. The club is known for its views of the Pacific Ocean and Catalina Island. The course featured three artificial waterfalls until they were removed during the 2011–2017 California drought. The Michael Douglas Pro-Celebrity and Friends Golf Tournament takes place there annually, in April.

At a cost of $264 million, it is the most expensive golf course ever constructed. Trump's representatives claimed the course was worth $10 million in dealing with the L.A. County property tax assessor two years after the course opened.

== History ==
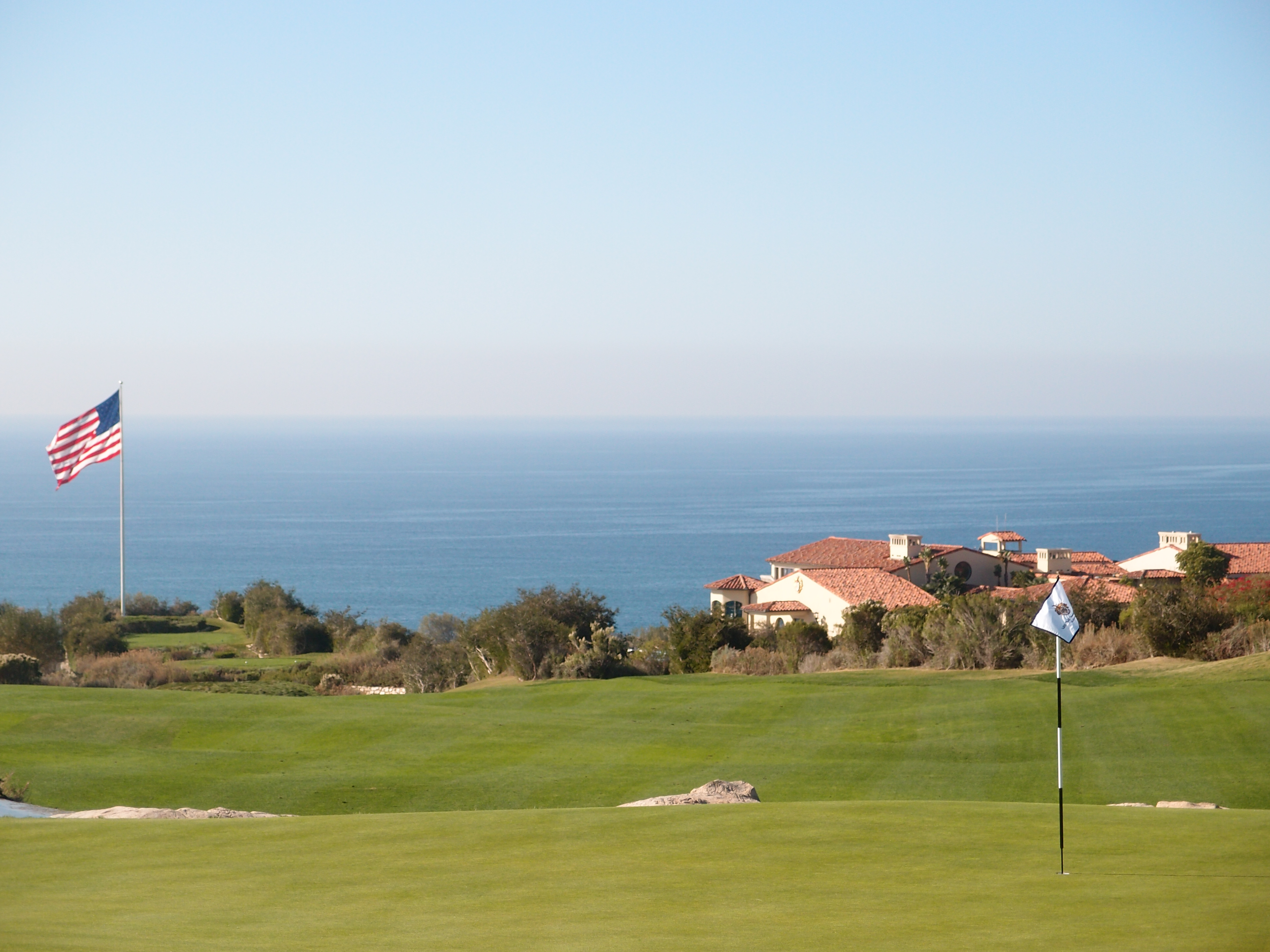
Overlooking the Pacific Ocean

The Ocean Trails Golf Club was part of a 150-acre (0.61 km^{2}) property owned by developer Edward Zuckerman and a partner. Prior to the Zuckerman purchase, the property was used as a farm. The golf course is on the Palos Verdes Peninsula known for its landslides. The height of the peninsula of 1,210 feet (370 m) above sea level and the action of the waves are two main contributing factors for the landslides. The stratification of the sedimentary rock below the course is visible in the high cliffs of the area as it gradually slopes seaward. The sloping and stratification create favorable conditions for the generation of landslides. As a result, homes and roads have been lost to the ocean in that area. In the area occupied by the golf course and its vicinity, there are three ancient landslides which have been named by geologists as A, B, and C respectively. The green of the Ocean Trails golf course 18th hole and half of its fairway were on top of ancient landslide C.

On June 2, 1999, the 10-year, $126 million construction project on the Ocean Trails golf course was almost complete and close to its scheduled opening when a landslide unexpectedly occurred, caused by the sudden reactivation of ancient landslide C, and 980-foot (300 m) of the 18th hole fairway disappeared under the ocean when a fissure parallel to the cliff appeared and subsequently collapsed. An island 705-foot (215 m) long was created due to the landslide, temporarily trapping a local resident. The landslide caused most of the 496-yard (454 m) par 4 18th hole to slide 50-foot (15 m) toward the ocean, including the fairway and green.

Also due to the slide, bike paths, walking paths, the edge of the bluffs and a segment of an LA County sewer line disappeared. It is believed that fluid discharge from the sewer line, probably leaking before the slide, acted as a lubricant on the thin underlying layer of bentonite, which became saturated with liquid sewage in turn, and that acted as a facilitator for the stratified geological accumulations to slide relative to each other. Bentonite, a form of clay, exhibits a low frictional coefficient when wet, i.e. it becomes slippery. The golf course opened with only 15 holes because of the landslide.

The landslide caused the Ocean Trails Golf Course construction project to go into bankruptcy. Covered by insurance funds, a massive geotechnical project was launched to reconstruct the 18th hole using 1,250,000 cubic yards (955,694 m^{3}) of earth to fill it. The stabilization work and the slide caused cosmetic damage to the course. At the time, golf course historian Geoff Shackelford said at the then-projected cost of repair of more than $20 million, the 18th hole would have been "the most expensive single hole in history".

After three years, legal issues between the involved banks and developers caused the geological stabilization work to stop. In 2002, Donald Trump stepped in and bought the 300-acre (1.2 km^{2}) property, including the golf course, with the intention of finalizing construction and repairs by the summer of 2003. On January 20, 2006, the 18-hole Trump National Golf Club Los Angeles opened in Rancho Palos Verdes. The reinforcement fill designed to stabilize the area affected by the slide is located under holes 17 and 18. During the massive geological stabilization process the golf course was open for business. The geological stabilization process was based on a geotechnical design involving the use of geosynthetic materials designed to enhance the cohesion and strength of the landslide fill. Asked about the safety of the work, Trump said: "If I'm ever in California for an earthquake, this is where I want to be standing".

In 2008, Trump sued the city of Rancho Palos Verdes for $100 million, alleging that the city did not allow him to make the improvements needed to maintain the "Trump image." The lawsuit was settled in 2012 for undisclosed terms. In 2015, Trump announced he would forgo his plans to build homes on 16 additional lots and granted an 11.5-acre conservation easement to the Palos Verdes Peninsula Land Conservancy. The same year, the course was scheduled to host the PGA Grand Slam of Golf. However, the tournament was cancelled by the PGA supposedly based on Trump's comments about illegal immigrants. A few sport teams and charities sought to move their charity-golf tournaments to other venues based on politics.

August 02, 2026 a Downey man named Jeanine John Taele was arrested for possession of an unregistered handgun as well as Hollow Point bullets. Taele had allegedly been scoping out the gulf course on multiple occasions and when confronted, he stated he was an employee with the State Department and needed to speak to Marco Rubio. Rand, Jory (August 5, 2026). "Man arrested near Trump LA golf course identified as Marine veteran". ABC7 News (KABC-TV). KABC Television, LLC.

== Media ==
- The Trump National Los Angeles was the setting for the filming of Golf Channel's The Big Break VI: Trump National.
- In the 2008 film Step Brothers, the course was used for the "Catalina Wine Mixer" scenes, doubling as Catalina Island.
- In the 2014 film Horrible Bosses 2, the 'cancel the order' scene was filmed at the golf course.
- The Modern Family 2014 episode "The Wedding (Part 2)" was filmed at the golf course.
- In 2016, it was the filming location for and the subject of the Adult Swim special The Adult Swim Golf Classic which depicted Trump National Los Angeles hosting a golf tournament in 1966 sponsored by the fictional cigarette company Portnoy 100s.

== Scorecard ==
Trump National Golf Club Los Angeles
Tee	Rating/Slope	1	2	3	4	5	6	7	8	9	Out	10	11	12	13	14	15	16	17	18	In	Total
Black	74.6 / 144	379	504	403	169	467	461	573	230	496	3682	440	223	531	441	491	167	338	240	503	3374	7056
Blue	71.9 / 136	334	452	362	150	439	405	544	199	462	3347	330	191	504	413	481	143	300	201	392	2955	6302
White	69.9 / 130	328	425	336	136	388	388	508	168	432	3109	307	135	478	386	461	130	289	183	367	2736	5845
SI	Men's	5	17	13	15	1	11	9	7	3		14	6	12	2	10	16	18	8	4
Par		4	5	4	3	4	4	5	3	4	36	4	3	5	4	5	3	4	3	4	35	71
SI	Women's	5	15	9	17	7	1	3	11	13		10	16	6	2	8	18	14	12	4
Red	67.1 / 121	302	403	276	116	315	358	448	147	398	2763	284	98	457	330	454	114	266	159	334	2496	5259
Gold	63.6 / 111	233	319	224	95	287	328	399	102	355	2362	230	98	416	258	412	91	204	135	301	2135	4497

== See also ==
- Donald Trump and golf
- List of things named after Donald Trump
