= The Gang Buys a Boat =

- It's Always Sunny in Philadelphia episode
- Episode no.: Season 6 Episode 3
- Directed by: Randall Einhorn
- Written by: Charlie Day; Rob McElhenney
- Cinematography by: Peter Smokler
- Editing by: Tim Roche
- Production code: XIP06001
- Original air date: September 30, 2010
- Running time: 22 minutes

Guest appearances
- Seth Morris as Ted Sally; Don Swayze as Ray

Episode chronology
← Previous "Dennis Gets Divorced"	Next → "Mac's Big Break"
- It's Always Sunny in Philadelphia season 6

"The Gang Buys a Boat" is the third episode of the sixth season of the American television sitcom It's Always Sunny in Philadelphia. It is the 60th overall episode of the series, and was written by executive producer Charlie Day and series creator Rob McElhenney, and directed by producer Randall Einhorn. It originally aired on FX on September 30, 2010.

The series follows "The Gang", a group of five misfit friends: twins Dennis and Deandra "(Sweet) Dee" Reynolds, their friends Charlie Kelly and Ronald "Mac" McDonald, and Frank Reynolds, Dennis' and Dee's legal father. The Gang runs the fictional Paddy's Pub, an unsuccessful Irish bar in South Philadelphia. In the episode, The Gang purchases a boat and disagrees on how to use it: Dennis, Mac, and Dee want a party boat, while Charlie and Frank want a shrimp boat.

== Plot ==
Mac (Rob McElhenney), Dennis (Glenn Howerton) and Charlie (Charlie Day) buy a boat, and invite Frank (Danny DeVito) and Dee (Kaitlin Olson) to join them. Mac declares himself captain while Charlie and Frank look for shrimp and oysters. Frank throws the boat keys to Charlie, but misses and throws them in the sea. While shopping for supplies for the boat, Dennis tells Mac how he intends on sleeping with women by implying that something bad would happen if they refuse. Frank and Dee start destroying stuff in the interior of the boat. Charlie, Frank and Dee paint the exterior of the boat while Dennis and Mac prepare for a party.

When Dennis and Mac leave, Charlie reveals to Dee and Frank that he has found the keys. Dennis and Mac arrive at the boat party, but find it full of old men, rather than the young women they were expecting. Mac and Dennis prepare to leave the party when a group of women enter, changing their minds. Charlie throws a SCUBA tank into the interior the boat and it hits a power socket, catching it, and the boat, on fire. Dennis and Mac take their respective ladies to the dock to the boat, but are met by Dee, Frank and Charlie leaving the sea. The boat, fully on fire, sinks into the sea.

== Production ==
The episode was directed by producer Randall Einhorn, and was written by executive producer Charlie Day and series creator Rob McElhenney, all of whom are main actors in the series.

== Reception ==
The episode was watched by 1.46 million viewers on its initial airing. It received positive reviews, with Dave Sims of The A.V. Club saying "I heartily enjoyed it", and giving it an A− rating. In contrast, The Cornell Daily Sun reviewed the episode, calling it "a good episode, but sadly, it doesn’t really stand out on its own."
