= Big Mouth (American TV series) =

American animated sitcom

- Genre: Adult animation; Animated sitcom; Blue comedy; Coming-of-age; Musical; Comedy drama
- Created by: Andrew Goldberg; Nick Kroll; Mark Levin; Jennifer Flackett
- Starring: Nick Kroll; John Mulaney; Jessi Klein; Jason Mantzoukas; Jenny Slate; Fred Armisen; Maya Rudolph; Jordan Peele; Ayo Edebiri; Andrew Rannells
- Opening theme: "Changes" by Charles Bradley
- Composers: Mark Rivers; Patrick Doyle ("Vagina Shame")
- Country of origin: United States
- Original language: English
- No. of seasons: 8
- No. of episodes: 81 (list of episodes)

Production
- Executive producers: Nick Kroll; Andrew Goldberg; Mark Levin; Jennifer Flackett; Blair Fetter; Kristen Zolner; Jane Wiseman
- Producers: Joe Wengert; Gil Ozeri; Kelly Galuska; Emily Altman; Victor Quinaz; Abe Forman-Greenwald; Kelly Cressman
- Editor: Felipe Salazar
- Running time: 25–46 minutes
- Production companies: Good at Bizness, Inc.; Fathouse Industries; Danger Goldberg Productions (seasons 1–5); Brutus Pink (seasons 6–8); Titmouse, Inc.

Original release
- Network: Netflix
- Release: September 29, 2017 – May 23, 2025

Related
- Human Resources

Big Mouth is an American adult animated coming-of-age musical sitcom created by Andrew Goldberg, Nick Kroll, Mark Levin, and Jennifer Flackett for Netflix. The series aired for eight seasons between 2017 and 2025. The series centers on students based on Kroll and Goldberg's upbringing in suburban New York, with Kroll voicing his fictionalized younger self. Big Mouth explores puberty while embracing an openness about the human body and sex.

The first season, consisting of ten episodes, premiered on Netflix on September 29, 2017, and the second season was released on October 5, 2018. The third season was preceded by a Valentine's Day special episode on February 8, 2019, and the rest of the third season was released on October 4, 2019. In July 2019, Netflix renewed the series through to a sixth season. The fourth season was released on December 4, 2020, and the fifth season was released on November 5, 2021. The sixth season premiered on October 28, 2022. A seventh season premiered on October 20, 2023. In April 2023, the series was renewed for an eighth and final season, making it one of Netflix's longest-running original scripted series ever produced. The final season was released on May 23, 2025.

Since its release, the series has received critical acclaim. A spin-off series titled Human Resources debuted on March 18, 2022, and ran for two seasons, concluding on June 9, 2023. In April 2023, Netflix confirmed that the series was canceled after two seasons.

== Plot ==
The series follows a group of middle school teenagers, including best friends Nick Birch and Andrew Glouberman, as they navigate their way through puberty with struggles such as masturbation and sexual arousal all in the Westchester County suburbs of New York. Acting as over-sexualized shoulder angels are the hormone monsters: Maurice (who pesters Andrew and Matthew and occasionally Nick), Connie (who pesters Jessi and Nick and occasionally Missy) and Mona (who mainly pesters Missy). Throughout the series, the kids interact with people and objects who are often personified and offer helpful, yet confusing, advice in their puberty-filled lives including the ghost of Duke Ellington, a French-accented Statue of Liberty, a pillow capable of getting pregnant, a capsule of Adderall, and even Jessi's own vulva, alongside other supernatural creatures that represent a human emotion like The Shame Wizard, the Depression Kitty, Tito the Anxiety Mosquito, and the Lovebugs Walter, Sonya and Rochelle. They seek out their destiny as puberty challenges them mentally and physically.

== Cast and characters ==
=== Main ===
- Nick Kroll as:
  - Nicholas Arsenio "Nick" Birch, an adolescent boy living with his loving and open-minded parents. He also has an older brother named Judd and an older sister named Leah. Throughout the series, Nick is increasingly insecure about his masculinity and overall development as it becomes evident that he is a late bloomer compared to his friends. Occasionally, he learns to appreciate his body and his emotions, with the help of his loved ones and a few other figures.
  - Maurice the Hormone Monster, also known as "Maury", full name Maurice Beverly, is a raspy-voiced monster who follows Andrew around and is responsible for his brooding sexual desires, which frequently occur at inappropriate moments. He is revealed to hail from an alternate dimension where several different creatures, such as himself, represent and manage the stages of human life. He is shown to be able to interact with other boys, such as Nick and Jay. He is also Matthew's hormone monster.
  - Coach Steve, the shrill-voiced middle school gym class teacher who is incompetent and overly talkative, often trying to get his colleagues—or even the students—to hang out (usually to no avail). He is extremely childlike. It is revealed in season 2 that he is a virgin, though he ultimately loses his virginity to Jay's mom, with whom he has a one-night stand after she sexually approaches him. He is the only character unaffected by The Shame Wizard because he is incapable of experiencing shame. In season 3, he has a different job every time he appears until in the episode "Disclosure the Movie: The Musical!" he gets his job back as a gym coach.
  - Rick the Hormone Monster, an old, dysfunctional yet enthusiastic hormone monster who follows Coach Steve and later Nick. He soon retires, however, after Steve loses his virginity, handing his position as Nick's hormone monster to Tyler. He becomes Nick's hormone monster again after Nick and Connie part ways.
  - Lola Ugfuglio Skumpy, an ill-tempered popular girl who is terrified of losing her social status and the approval of her best friend Devin. She has a relationship with Jay in season 4, but it ends badly. Her relationship with Jay becomes on again-off again in the following season.
  - Nick Starr, the future version of Nick who hosts a game show and lives alone with a robot version of Andrew.
  - Stu, Marty's old and weak lovebug, Marty is only convinced to stay by his lovebug. Marty blames Barbara for changing, but she points out that he used to be a sweet romantic, and he is shocked to find out she's been unhappy for years.
  - Kroll also voices Mila and Lotte Janssen, the Statue of Liberty, a profane ladybug, Joe Walsh, the ghosts of Picasso and Richard Burton, Sylvester Stallone, a webcam girl, several tampons, Gina's Abuela, Bad Mitten and Rabbi Poblart.
  - Kroll also appears as himself in live-action in the season five finale, as the person in charge of Human Resources.
- John Mulaney as Andrew Glouberman, Nick's best friend who spends much of his time furtively masturbating. He is Jewish and his dysfunctional family annoys him.
  - Mulaney also voices Mint, Grandpa Andrew, Babe the Blue Ox, and Detective Florez.
- Jessi Klein as Jessica Cobain "Jessi" Glaser, a sarcastic and smart girl. Her father, Greg, is an unemployed stoner and her mother, Shannon, is secretly dating another woman. Her parents later divorce. She gets her period for the first time on a school trip to the Statue of Liberty. Though Jessi has kissed Nick before, specifically in the first episode "Ejaculation", she later has many French kissing make-out sessions with Jay. Like Andrew, she is Jewish, as she has a Bat Mitzvah in "I Survived Jessi's Bat Mitzvah".
  - Klein also voices Jessi's possible ancestor, Margaret Daniels, in "Duke".
- Jason Mantzoukas as Jayzerian Ricflairian "Jay" Bilzerian, a brash teenage boy who is obsessed with magic and sex. He has sex with a pillow that he made into a sex toy. His mom has a one-night stand with Coach Steve in Season 2. He has two older brothers, Kurt and Val, who frequently bully him. His dad is a divorce lawyer, and Jay has a habit of quoting his father's law commercials, often being told by his friends to stop. Jay is obsessed with Nick's mother and father and wishes for a loving family. In season 2, Jay shares a kiss with Matthew, an openly gay boy in school, during a game of "Smooch or Share". After the two kiss, Jay questions his sexual orientation. During season 3, Jay continues to question his sexual orientation but comes to the conclusion he is bisexual. In Season 5, Matthew breaks up with Aiden because he has truer feelings for Jay. Jay and Matthew decide to go to Devin and Devon's New Year's party together.
  - Mantzoukas also voices Guy Bilzerian, Jay's father who is a corrupt divorce lawyer, and the landlord of a seedy all-men motel called "Guy Town". His commercials are well known in the neighborhood and Jay takes every opportunity he can to quote them, to the ire of his classmates.
  - Mantzoukas also voices the ghost of Socrates.
- Jenny Slate (seasons 1–4) and Ayo Edebiri (seasons 4–8) as Melissa "Missy" Foreman-Greenwald, a nerdy and kind girl who is a frequent target of Andrew's affection. Missy sometimes has trouble relating to her peers due to her sheltered upbringing and general naiveté, but during Season 3, she starts to mature (both physically and emotionally) and eventually gains her own hormone monster, Mona. In season 4, Missy also begins exploring (and more deeply embracing) her African-American heritage.
  - Slate also voiced Mirror Missy, Missy's verbally abusive reflection, meant to represent the insecurities over her body, as well as Missy's repressed anger.
  - Slate also voices Caitlin Grafton, Greg's new girlfriend and mother of Jessi's half-sister, Delilah.
  - Slate also voices Vicky, Cherry's delinquent friend, Taffiny, a pharmacist, a Planned Parenthood nurse, Ms. Razz, The Implant, the Fuck Gremlin, and Matthew's sister, Britney.
  - Slate stepped down as Missy's voice actress near the end of season 4, believing the role of an African-American character should be voiced by an African-American actress.
  - Edebiri is initially heard as Mosaic Missy, an amalgamation of all of Missy's different alter-egos and personality traits.
  - Edebiri also voices Maya.
- Fred Armisen as Elliot Birch (often referred to as Dr. Birch), Nick's loving father, who is a doctor and frequently shares inappropriate stories. His real name is William McGregor, as revealed in season 6.
  - Armisen also voices the ghost of Antonin Scalia, a bus driver, Stavros, and Bob the Hormone Monster.
- Maya Rudolph as:
  - Connie the Hormone Monstress, full name Constance LaCienega, who initially follows Jessi (and sometimes Missy) around and encourages them to embrace their wildest desires. By the end of the second season, she becomes Nick's hormone monster, despite him being a boy, which works well for them both.
  - Diane Birch, Nick's loving mother.
  - Bonrad "Bonnie" LaCienega, Connie's twin sister, and Leah's hormone monster. Bonnie is a little more uptight than her twin sister and has an extreme dislike of Maury.
  - Rudolph also voices a bath mat, the ghosts of Elizabeth Taylor and Whitney Houston, Principal Barren, Miss Clinkscales, Ellington's piano teacher, Gayle King, and Missy's aunt.
- Jordan Peele as the Ghost of Duke Ellington (1899–1974), the jazz musician whose spirit now lives in Nick's attic and sometimes offers him advice.
  - Featuring Ludacris, Jay's pitbull, who suffers from a rare medical condition that causes him to become cripplingly self-aware.
  - Balthazar, one of the Knights of St. Joseph representing Lola's pubic hairs.
  - Peele also voices the ghosts of Freddie Mercury, David Bowie, and Prince, Atlanta Claus, a DJ, Missy's father Cyrus, Patrick Ewing, Missy's grandmother, and Santa Claus.
    - Brendan McCreary provides the ghost of Freddie Mercury's singing voice.

=== Recurring ===
- Andrew Rannells as Matthew MacDell, a flamboyantly gay student with a love of drama.
- Paula Pell as Barbara Glouberman, Andrew's mother and Marty's wife.
- Richard Kind as Marty Glouberman, Andrew's grumpy and overbearing father, Barbara's husband and lover of scallops.
- Seth Morris as Greg Glaser, the perpetually stoned father of Jessi Glaser and the ex-husband of Shannon Glaser.
- Jessica Chaffin as Shannon Glaser, the mother of Jessi Glaser and the unfaithful ex-wife of Greg Glaser.
- June Diane Raphael as Devin LeSeven, a popular student at school who frequently mocks other characters.
- Jak Knight as DeVon Furtive-Oldman, the ex-husband of Devin and another popular student, who suffers from childhood arthritis.
- Gina Rodriguez as Gina Alvarez, a very physically developed Paraguayan girl on Missy and Jessi's soccer team whose sudden pubertal development causes a stir at school.
- Neil Casey as Lars, a student in a wheelchair.
  - Casey also voices Detective Dumont.
- Joe Wengert as Caleb Linden, a student, implied to be on the autism spectrum.
  - Wengert also voices Lump Humpman, a priest, Leore Paulblart the Ponytail Killer, and Stan the Hormone Monster.
  - Wengert also voices Joe, an older Hormone Monster from Human Resources who, with Gil, becomes Elijah's Hormone Monster.
- Fran Gilesspie as Samira, a student who speaks quietly and begins dating Ali.
- Jon Daly as Judd Birch, the dark yet caring older brother of Nick and Leah Birch, and the son of Diane and Elliot Birch. In "Nick Starr", the Judd of 2052 now rules over "Juddstown", offering sanctuary the day before the end of the world.
  - Daly also voices Jesus Christ & Pumbaa, Timon's boyfriend.
- Kat Dennings (seasons 1–4) with Chloe Fineman (seasons 5–8) as Leah Birch, the older sister of Nick Birch and younger sister of Judd Birch.
  - Fineman also voices Delilah, Jessi's newborn half-sister, Greg and Caitlin's daughter, Timon, & Jourdan.
- Chelsea Peretti as Monica Foreman-Greenwald, Missy's mother and Cyrus' wife.
  - Peretti also voices Cellsea, Nick's sentient cell phone that he received from Leah, and "The Pill"
- Heather Lawless as Jenna "Jay's Mom" Bilzerian, Jay's mother.
- Mark Duplass as Val Bilzerian, an older, bullying brother to Jay Bilzerian.
  - Duplass also voices a clerk.
- Paul Scheer as Kurt Bilzerian, another older, bullying brother to Jay Bilzerian.
  - Scheer also voices a gap-toothed male camper.
- Nathan Fillion as himself, Missy's celebrity crush.
  - Fillion also voices Nate, the leader of the robotics club.
- Rob Huebel as Mr. Terry Lizer, a teacher at the school.
- David Thewlis as Lionel St. Swithens, a Shame Wizard and the Hormone Monsters' mortal enemy who haunts the kids, stoking their deepest shame.
- John Gemberling as Tyler Pico, Nick's immature hormone monster.
  - Gemberling also voices a security guard.
- Gil Ozeri as Wiggles, Missy's stuffed toy.
  - Ozeri also voices Brad, a couch cushion.
  - Ozeri also voices Gil, an older Hormone Monster from Human Resources, who, with Joe, becomes Elijah's Hormone Monsters.
- Kristen Bell as Pam, a pillow Jay has a sexual relationship with.
  - Bell also voices an uninterested girl.
- Jack McBrayer as Nick's pubic hair #1
- Craig Robinson as Nick's pubic hair #2
- Rosa Salazar as Miss Benitez, a seventh-grade teacher.
- Michaela Watkins as Cantor Dina Reznick, Shannon Glaser's love interest who serves as the Cantor of the Temple Beth Amphetamine.
- Zach Woods as Daniel, a boy Leah is interested in.
  - Woods also voices a sock.
  - Woods also voices Andrew Rubenfeld, Nick's friend at private school.
- Natasha Lyonne as Suzette, a motel pillow.
  - Lyonne also voices Nadia Vulvokov, her character from Russian Doll and Ms. Dunn, a high school health class teacher.
- Alia Shawkat as Roland, a friend of Nick's who lives in Manhattan, New York.
- Kristen Wiig as Jessi's vulva.
  - Wiig also voices Beatrice, the vulva's evil twin whenever she has a yeast infection.
- Andy Daly as Dr. Wendy Engle, Nick's doctor.
  - Daly also voices a motel pillow and the ghost of Harry Houdini.
- Harvey Fierstein as Jerome, an older gay man who lives in Guy Town.
- Jean Smart (seasons 2–4) and Maria Bamford (season 8) as Kitty Bouchet the Depression Kitty, an anthropomorphic purple cat employed in the Department of Puberty's Depression Ward.
- Bobby Cannavale as Gavin Reeves, an intense Hormone Monster that Nick hopes to have Tyler replaced, who works as his assistant and gets abused by.
  - Cannavale also voices Nick Starr's agent.
- Zachary Quinto as Aiden, Matthew's ex-boyfriend.
- Ali Wong as Ali Chen, a pansexual new student at Bridgeton Middle School.
- Carlos Alazraqui as Gustavo, the male character in the book The Rock of Gibraltar.
- Gary Cole as Edward MacDell, Matthew's father. A U.S. Navy veteran who knows that his son is gay.
- Julie White as Kimberly MacDell, Matthew's mother.
- Julie Klausner as Cherry Marashina, formerly Cheryl Glouberman, Andrew's attractive cousin in Florida.
- Judd Hirsch as Lewis Glouberman, Andrew's late grandfather.
- David Cross as Skip Glouberman, Marty's brother and Andrew's uncle.
- Thandiwe Newton as Mona, Missy's British-accented hormone monstress.
- Maria Bamford as Tito Taylor Thomas the Anxiety Mosquito.
  - Bamford also voices Nancy, Jessi's therapist.
- John Oliver as Harry, a camp counselor.
- Seth Rogen as Seth Goldberg, a Canadian camper.
- Emily Altman as "Milk", a male camper who is often told to "shut the fuck up" and brings up his father's friend, Bob Reedy.
- Somali Rose as Missy's overalls.
- Zach Galifianakis as the Gratitoad, a talking toad that expresses gratitude.
- Josie Totah as Natalie el-Khoury, a transgender camper.
- Lena Waithe as Lena, one of Missy's cousins.
- Quinta Brunson as Quinta, one of Missy's cousins.
  - Brunson also voiced a girl at a bar that was hit on by young Duke Ellington in "Duke".
- Sterling K. Brown as Michael Angelo, Jessi's ex-boyfriend in New York.
- Brandon Kyle Goodman as Walter Las Palmas, Nick's Lovebug turned hate-worm.
- Keke Palmer as Rochelle Hillhurst, Missy's lovebug who was a hate-worm.
- Pamela Adlon as Sonya Poinsetta, Jessi's lovebug.
- Kristen Schaal as Bernadette "Bernie" Sanders, a girl that Andrew met during skiing with Nick's family, who shares her name with the Vermont Senator.
- Jemaine Clement as Simon Sex, a sensitive, shroom-taking Hormone Monster.
- Brian Tyree Henry as Elijah, an asexual religious African-American kid who Missy is in love with.
- Chris O'Dowd as Flanny O'Lympic, Andrew's Irish accented lovebug that debuted in Human Resources.
- Peter Capaldi as Seamus MacGregor, Nick's long lost Scottish grandfather and Elliot's estranged father who was his coach in nipple twisting.
- Cole Escola as Montel, Maury's and Connie's biological non-binary child.
- Megan Thee Stallion as Megan, a Hormone Monstress modeled after the rapper.
- Zazie Beetz as Danni, Megan's client.
- Stephanie Beatriz as Lulu, a High School Student at Bridgeton High.
- Billy Porter as Ocean, a High School Student at Bridgeton High who leads the School's Queer Choir.
- Patrick Page as Dread, a giant black blob who embodies an excess of human fear.
- Whitmer Thomas as Camden, one of the Burnouts at Bridgeton High who becomes Jessi's boyfriend.

=== Guest ===
- Jess Harnell as Dwayne Johnson, a depiction of the former wrestler turned actor who is starring in a fictional film about Paul Bunyan.
- Nasim Pedrad as Fatima, the female character in the book The Rock of Gibraltar.
- Mae Whitman as Tallulah Levine, a friend of Leah's who takes a liking to Nick.
- Jon Hamm as a plate of Scallops, with which Marty has a secret obsession.
- Martin Short as Gordie, the main character of the Canadian Netflix hit, Gordie's Journey.
- Carol Kane as the Menopause Banshee, a banshee that represents female menopause.
- Wanda Sykes as the ghost of Harriet Tubman.
- Rob Riggle as Col. Adderall, the personification of the ADHD medication.
- Antoni Porowski, Tan France, Karamo Brown, Bobby Berk, and Jonathan Van Ness from Queer Eye as themselves, sent to makeover Coach Steve.
- Retta as Daisy Ellington, Duke Ellington's mother.
- Paul Giamatti as Andrew's feces, an internal representation of constipation within Andrew that made him develop "Poop Madness".
- Maya Erskine and Anna Konkle as Misha and Izzy, two seventh-graders Nick and Andrew hook up with, and the stars of their own Netflix series, Cafeteria Girls. Their characters are a reference to their show PEN15.
- Aidy Bryant as Emmy Fairfax, a female Lovebug, a friend of Walter's, and Devin's Hateworm.
- Kumail Nanjiani as himself, where he was seen in a video discussing "No Nut November" during a workout routine.
- Adam Scott as Dylan Keating, a school teacher with whom Andrew is infatuated.
- Hugh Jackman as himself, a fictitious version of the actor depicted as one of Maury's talking dicks.
- Annaleigh Ashford as The Rice Purity Test, an anthropomorphic quiz.
- Amber Ruffin as Amber, Elijah's aunt
- Ira Glass as himself, who can be heard through an audio podcast.
- Jeff Goldblum as the Apple Brooch
- Steve-O as himself (in live-action), in a Cameo for Lola
- Tyler the Creator as Jesus
- Juliet Mills as Rita St. Swithens, the Grand Dame of Humiliation and Lionel's mother. She was previously voiced by Helen Mirren in Human Resources.
- Adam Levine, Ed Helms and Matt Rogers as members of the boy band, Bros 4 Life.
- Lupita Nyong’o as Asha, a Kenyan Shame Wizard.
- Padma Lakshmi as Priya, Marissa's mother
- Maitreyi Ramakrishnan as Marissa, an Indian-American girl who moved across where Andrew lives.
- Rosie Perez as Petra the Ambition Gremlin, a Gremlin that represents human ambitions.
- Randall Park as Peter "Pete" Doheny, a Logic Rock that represents logic within humans.
- Lin-Manuel Miranda as a Puerto Rican pubic hair
- Don Cheadle as himself.
- Steve Buscemi as Mr. Pink, Andrew Rubenfeld's cat.
- Holly Hunter as Coco, the Compassion Pachyderm.
- James III as Cat Stevens, Camden's depression kitty.
- Cynthia Erivo as Missy's vagina.
- Natalie Decker as herself.
- Paul Frees as Maurice the Hormone Monster, Matthew MacDell
- Mel Blanc as Rick the Hormone Monster.

== Episodes ==
Season	Episodes		Originally released
1	10		September 29, 2017
2	10		October 5, 2018
3	11	1	February 8, 2019
3	11	10	October 4, 2019
4	10		December 4, 2020
5	10		November 5, 2021
6	10		October 28, 2022
7	10		October 20, 2023
8	10		May 23, 2025

== Production ==
=== Development ===
TV writer Andrew Goldberg and screenwriter-directors Jennifer Flackett and Mark Levin approached Nick Kroll, Goldberg's best friend since childhood, with the idea to develop a show about going through puberty. Kroll and Goldberg used their divergent pubertal experiences as a centerpiece of the show, because Kroll was a late bloomer while Goldberg went through the physical changes of puberty very early. Big Mouth was also partially inspired to help aid teenagers in states with abstinence-based sex education. Many of their experiences are featured in the show, such as Kroll's first kiss, and Goldberg's parents waxing his mustache. The show also includes an experience of their childhood friend, Lizzie, who the character of Jessi is based on, getting her first period on a school trip to the Statue of Liberty. According to Kroll in an interview on NPR, Big Mouth "takes an equal look at what it's like for girls and women, the process of going through puberty, which I think has not been quite as explored in most popular culture." Netflix announced they had picked up Big Mouth in June 2016.

On June 24, 2020, Jenny Slate stepped down from voicing Missy Foreman-Greenwald so that a Black actress could have the role in the wake of the George Floyd protests. Slate's final time voicing Missy is in the fourth season as she recorded her lines in advance. Ayo Edebiri was cast to replace Slate as Missy. Her first appearance as Missy is in "Horrority House", the penultimate episode of the fourth season. On April 24, 2023, Netflix renewed the series for an eighth and final season. In April 2024, Netflix confirmed that the eighth and final season was set to air in 2025. The final season was released May 23, 2025.

== Music ==
The first soundtrack album of songs from the TV series was released alongside season three on October 4, 2019.

Super Songs of Big Mouth Vol. 1 (Music from the Netflix Original Series)

Soundtrack album by Various artists
- Released: October 4, 2019
- Recorded: 2016–2019
- Genre: TV soundtrack
- Length: 33:58
- Label: Netflix Studios

No.	Title	Performer(s)	Length
1.	"Totally Gay"	Mark Rivers	1:42
2.	"I Love My Body"	Maya Rudolph	1:54
3.	"Valentine's Day"	Fred Armisen, Jak Knight, Jason Mantzoukas, Jessi Klein, Nick Kroll, Richard Kind	2:09
4.	"Never Lost in New York City"	Jordan Peele	1:07
5.	"I Am The Hormone Monstress (dialogue)"	Rudolph, Klein	0:21
6.	"Sexy Red Bra"	Rudolph, Rivers	1:37
7.	"Slut Walk"	Ileen Goldsmith, Crissy Guerrero, Knight, Mantzoukas, Klein, Kroll	1:21
8.	"Guy Town"	Rivers, Jerry Minor, Mantzoukas, Marvin Robinson	1:32
9.	"Why Does Nobody (Get How Great I Am?)"	Klein, Rudolph, Kroll	1:26
10.	"You Look Beautiful, Steve (dialogue)"	Kroll	0:22
11.	"Sex On A Lady"	Kroll, Rivers	1:31
12.	"Life Is a Fucked Up Mess"	Klein, Jessica Chaffin, John Mulaney, Kroll, Kind, Seth Morris	1:22
13.	"Disclosure (The Musical)"	Andrew Rannells, Klein, Mulaney, June Diane Raphael, Rivers, Kroll	2:25
14.	"Anything Goes in Florida"	Kroll, Rivers	1:28
15.	"Perfectly Gross Little Dirtbag (dialogue)"	Kroll, Mulaney	0:20
16.	"Shame"	David Thewlis, Rivers	2:07
17.	"The Spectrum of Sexuality"	Martin Short, Brendan McCreary, Peele, Rivers, Rudolph	1:58
18.	"You've Got the Power Now"	Kroll, Jenny Slate, Thandie Newton, Rudolph	0:52
19.	"Slice O' Your Pie"	Peele	1:10
20.	"I Feel Like Shit (This Must Be Love)"	Slate, Mulaney	1:15
21.	"Sex on a Lady (credits version)"	Craig Robinson	2:20
22.	"Who Needs a Boy?"	Rannells, Goldsmith, Rudolph, Kroll	1:55
23.	"Everybody's Going Through Changes (written by Anthony Frank Iommi, Ozzy Osbourne, Terence Michael Butler, and W.T. Ward)"	Rudolph, Peele	1:44
Total length:			33:58

The second soundtrack album of songs from the TV series was released alongside season six on October 28, 2022.

All songs written by Mark Rivers except where indicated.

Super Songs of Big Mouth Vol. 2 (Music from the Netflix Series)

Soundtrack album by Various artists
- Released: October 28, 2022
- Recorded: 2020–2022
- Genre: TV soundtrack
- Length: 37:45
- Label: Netflix Studios

No.	Title	Performer(s)	Length
1.	"The Previously on Big Mouth Song"	feat. Mark Rivers	2:01
2.	"Best Friends Make The Best Lovers (Cast Version)"	Maya Rudolph feat. Rivers, Crissy Guerrero	1:55
3.	"Hot Pocket Party"	Nick Kroll feat. Andrew Rannells, Rivers and Joe Wengert	1:18
4.	"Poop Madness"	Rivers	2:11
5.	"Girl, We Got With Your Mom"	Ed Helms and Matt Rogers with Adam Levine	1:49
6.	"How Great You Are"	Kroll	0:42
7.	"Sucks Bein' Me"	Kroll	1:29
8.	"Tonight!"	Kroll, John Mulaney, Jason Mantzoukas and Paula Pell	1:33
9.	"Do You Feel the Love?"	Brandon Kyle Goodman and Kroll feat. Rivers and Guerrero	1:53
10.	"I Used to Be Her Favorite"	Rannells	1:40
11.	"I'm Fucking Lola!"	Kroll feat. Rannells, Jon Daly, Wengert and Rivers	2:03
12.	"Cafeteria Girls"	Rivers	1:02
13.	"I'm So Horny"	Rivers	1:46
14.	"Feels So Good to Hate"	Ayo Edebiri and Kroll feat. Goodman and Keke Palmer	1:50
15.	"The Rice Purity Test"	Annaleigh Ashford	0:59
16.	"The You That's in Your Heart"	Cole Escola and Rudolph	1:50
17.	"Lola and Jay"	Kroll and Kristen Rivers	1:41
18.	"You'll Always Have Shame"	David Thewlis feat. Rivers and Guerrero	1:57
19.	"Rodney's Lament"	Daly	0:51
20.	"Dads Out the Ass"	Kroll, Helms and Rogers with Levine	1:29
21.	"Code Switching"	Jak Knight	1:38
22.	"Helpless"	Big Mouth cast	1:44
23.	"What're You Gonna Do?"	Kroll feat. Rudolph, Jean Smart and Rivers	1:47
24.	"Changes (Orchestral Version)"	Patrick Doyle and Mary Carewe	0:37
Total length:			37:45

== Release ==
The first season, consisting of ten episodes, premiered on Netflix on September 29, 2017. On October 24, 2017, it was confirmed that a second season had been ordered, which was released on October 5, 2018. On November 17, 2018, Netflix announced that Big Mouth had been renewed for a third season. The third season was preceded by a Valentine's Day special episode on February 8, 2019. On July 26, 2019, Netflix renewed the series through to a sixth season. On August 21, 2019, it was reported that the third season was set to be released on October 4, 2019. The fourth season was released on December 4, 2020. The fifth season was released on November 5, 2021. In April 2022, Netflix renewed the show for a seventh season, ahead of the sixth-season premiere. The sixth season was released on October 28, 2022. The seventh season was released on October 20, 2023. The eighth and final season was released on May 23, 2025.

== Reception ==
=== Critical response ===
Critical response of Big Mouth
Season	Rotten Tomatoes	Metacritic
1	100% (24 reviews)	80 (6 reviews)
2	100% (33 reviews)	90 (9 reviews)
3	97% (33 reviews)	84 (5 reviews)
4	100% (24 reviews)	88 (4 reviews)
5	100% (6 reviews)	N/A (1 review)
6	N/A (4 reviews)	N/A (3 reviews)
7	71% (7 reviews)	68 (4 reviews)
8	100% (7 reviews)	73 (4 reviews)

Big Mouth has received critical acclaim. On Rotten Tomatoes, the first season has an approval rating of 100% based on 23 reviews, with an average rating of 8.10 out of 10. The website's critics consensus reads, "Big Mouth's simplistic animation and scatological humor belie its finely sketched characters and smart, empathetic approach to the messiness of adolescence." On Metacritic, it holds a rating of 80 out of 100, based on six critics.

On Rotten Tomatoes, the second season has an approval rating of 100% based on 33 reviews, with an average rating of 8.80 out of 10. The website's critics consensus reads "Poignantly repulsive, Big Mouth continues to confront the awkwardness of adolescence with foul-mouthed glee and an added layer of maturity." On Metacritic, it has a score of 90 out of 100 for the second season, based on nine critics.

On Rotten Tomatoes, the third season has an approval rating of 97% based on 33 reviews with an average rating of 8.00 out 10. The website's critics consensus reads, "Like the characters at its center, Big Mouth's third season continues to grow, taking on complicated new issues with the same gross-but-utterly-empathetic eye that made it so lovable in the first place." On Metacritic, it has a score of 84 out of 100 for the third season, based on five critics.

On Rotten Tomatoes, the fourth season has an approval rating of 100% based on 22 reviews, with an average rating of 8.30 out of 10. The website's critics consensus reads, "Big Mouth's fourth season is another tour de force of empathetic cringe comedy that manages to get even better by finally giving Missy the storyline she deserves." On Metacritic, it has a score of 88 out of 100 for the fourth season, based on four critics.

On Rotten Tomatoes, the fifth season has an approval rating of 100% based on five reviews.

On Rotten Tomatoes, the sixth season has an approval rating of 100% based on four reviews. On Metacritic, it has a score of 84 out of 100 for the sixth season, based on three critics.

On Rotten Tomatoes, the seventh season has an approval rating of 71% based on seven reviews. On Metacritic, the seventh season has a score of 68 out of 100, based on four critics.

Vox described the first season as sharp and jarring depicting the awkwardness of pubescence, post-pubescence, and pre-pubescence. Erik Adams from The A.V. Club awarded the second season an "A−". Adams praised the cast, especially Thewlis, and the experimentation of this season, commenting that "it's shown that it deserves to be included in any conversation about TV's animated greats."

=== Accolades ===
Year	Award	Category	Nominee(s)	Result	Ref.
2018	Annie Awards	Best General Audience Television/Broadcast Production	Big Mouth (for "Am I Gay?")	Nominated	
2018	Primetime Emmy Awards	Outstanding Original Music and Lyrics	Mark Rivers (for "Totally Gay")	Nominated	
2019	Annie Awards	Best General Audience Television/Broadcast Production	Big Mouth (for "The Planned Parenthood Show")	Nominated	
2019	Annie Awards	Outstanding Achievement for Writing in an Animated Television/Broadcast Production	Emily Altman	Nominated	
2019	MTV Movie & TV Awards	Best Show	Big Mouth	Nominated	
2019	MTV Movie & TV Awards	Best Comedic Performance	John Mulaney	Nominated	
2019	Primetime Emmy Awards	Outstanding Animated Program	Big Mouth (for "The Planned Parenthood Show")	Nominated	
2020	Casting Society of America	Television – Animation	Julie Ashton-Barson	Won	
2020	Primetime Emmy Awards	Outstanding Animated Program	Big Mouth (for "Disclosure the Movie: The Musical")	Nominated	
2020	Primetime Emmy Awards	Outstanding Character Voice-Over Performance	Maya Rudolph as Connie the Hormone Monstress (for "How To Have An Orgasm")	Won	
2020	Primetime Emmy Awards	Outstanding Derivative Interactive Program	Big Mouth Guide to Life	Won	
2021	Critics' Choice Super Awards	Best Animated Series	Big Mouth	Nominated	
2021	Critics' Choice Super Awards	Best Voice Actor in an Animated Series	Nick Kroll	Nominated	
2021	Critics' Choice Super Awards	Best Voice Actor in an Animated Series	John Mulaney	Nominated	
2021	Critics' Choice Super Awards	Best Voice Actress in an Animated Series	Maya Rudolph	Nominated	
2021	GLAAD Media Awards	Outstanding Comedy Series	Big Mouth	Nominated	
2021	Annie Awards	Outstanding Achievement for Writing in an Animated Television/Broadcast Production	Andrew Goldberg and Patti Harrison	Won	
2021	American Cinema Editors Awards	Best Edited Animation (Non-Theatrical)	Felipe Salazar (for "Nick Starr")	Nominated	
2021	Casting Society of America Awards	Television Animation	Julie Ashton	Won	
2021	NAACP Image Awards	Outstanding Animated Series	Big Mouth	Nominated	
2021	Hollywood Critics Association TV Awards	Best Animated Series or Animated Television Movie	Big Mouth	Nominated	
2021	Primetime Emmy Awards	Outstanding Animated Program	Big Mouth (for "The New Me")	Nominated	
2021	Primetime Emmy Awards	Outstanding Character Voice-Over Performance	Maya Rudolph as Connie the Hormone Monstress (for "A Very Special 9/11 Episode")	Won	
2022	Casting Society of America Awards	Television Animation	Julie Ashton	Won	
2022	NAACP Image Awards	Outstanding Animated Series	Big Mouth	Nominated	
2022	Hollywood Critics Association TV Awards	Best Streaming Animated Series or Television Movie	Big Mouth	Nominated	
2022	Primetime Emmy Awards	Outstanding Character Voice-Over Performance	Maya Rudolph as Connie the Hormone Monstress (for "A Very Big Mouth Christmas")	Nominated	
2023	Casting Society of America Awards	Television Animation	Julie Ashton	Won	
2023	Primetime Emmy Awards	Outstanding Character Voice-Over Performance	Maya Rudolph as Connie the Hormone Monstress (for "Asexual Healing")	Won	
2024	Casting Society of America Awards	Television Animation	Julie Ashton	Won	
2024	Primetime Emmy Awards	Outstanding Character Voice-Over Performance	Maya Rudolph as Connie the Hormone Monstress (for "The Ambition Gremlin")	Won	
2025	Casting Society of America Awards	Television Animation	Julie Ashton	Nominated	
2025	Primetime Emmy Awards	Outstanding Character Voice-Over Performance	Maya Rudolph as Connie the Hormone Monstress (for "Why Do We Go Through Puberty?")	Nominated	

== Spin-off ==
On October 3, 2019, Netflix announced a straight-to-series order for a spin-off series titled Human Resources, set within the show's universe. Kroll, Goldberg, Levin, Flackett and Kelly Galuska will produce. On June 14, 2021, more details of the series were announced, including casting. Kroll, Rudolph, Thewlis, Bryant, Cannavale, Newton, Bamford, Goodman, Palmer, Clement and Adlon reprised their roles for the spin-off, with additional cast members Randall Park, Rosie Perez, and Henry Winkler joining the series. It was released on March 18, 2022. Human Resources then released its second and final season on June 9, 2023.

== In other media ==
Detective Florez made a silent cameo appearance in the 2022 live-action/animated hybrid film Chip 'n Dale: Rescue Rangers.
