= Gil Ozeri =

American comedian, actor, and writer

Gil Ozeri is an American comedian, actor, and writer, known for his work writing for Brooklyn Nine-Nine, Big Mouth, and Happy Endings.

== Career ==
Ozeri started his comedy career with the Upright Citizens Brigade (UCB) in New York, and has continued to collaborate with many fellow UCB actors, including Ben Schwartz, Jon Daly, and Adam Pally. In addition to his television writing, he has gained attention for making short, surreal videos released via Snapchat. He has garnered attention for stunts involving watching marathons of the entirety of the television shows Two and a Half Men and Entourage.

In April 2019, he was announced as a main cast member in an NBC pilot, Friends-in-Law.

Ozeri appeared on The George Lucas Talk Show charity fundraiser The George Lucas Talk Show All Day Star Wars Movie Watch Along.

== Personal life ==
Ozeri is Jewish. In 2017, Ozeri tweeted that his maternal grandfather was a Holocaust survivor and refugee, and that his father's parents were Yemeni Jews who, in 1948, were airlifted to Israel.

== Filmography ==
=== Film ===
Year	Title	Role	Notes
2015	Slow Learners	Dan	
2020	Uncorked	Richie	
2020	Death of a Telemarketer	Justin	

=== Television ===
Year	Title	Role	Notes
2006	Late Night with Conan O'Brien	Various	Episode #14.25
2007	Starveillance	Corey	3 episodes
2007	Bronx World Travelers	Gil #2	2 episodes
2009	CollegeHumor Originals	Sayid	Episode: "Sayid from Lost Bombs at Stand-Up"
2009–2011	UCB Comedy Originals	Len Bycel	3 episodes
2010–2011	The Back Room	Various roles	4 episodes
2011	Happy Endings	Yoni	Episode: "Of Mice & Jazz-Kwon-Do"; also writer
2011	NTSF:SD:SUV::	College Kid 3-D	Episode: "One Cabeza, Two Cabeza, Three Cabeza... Dead!"; also writer
2012	Friday Night Dinner	Gary Fisher	Television film
2013, 2014	Comedy Bang! Bang!	Alfie Gaye / Billy Big Mouth Guy	2 episodes
2014	Duty	Lonnie	Television film
2016, 2018	Another Period	Harry Houdini / Waiter	2 episodes
2016	American Dad!		Voice, episode: "The Unincludeds"
2017	Drive Share	Driver	Episode: "Balls Deep"
2017	Powerless	Zane	Episode: "Cold Season"
2017	Animals	Chuck	Voice, episode: "Roaches"
2017–2025	Big Mouth	Gil, Various roles	Voice, 24 episodes; also writer
2018	LA to Vegas	Dummy	Voice, episode: "Overbooked"
2019	American Housewife	Man	Episode: "Phone Free Day"
2020	BlackAF	Danny	7 episodes
2020	Search Party	Cop #1	Episode: "The Accused Woman"
2020	Hoops	Isaac	Voice, 8 episodes
2021	Curb Your Enthusiasm	New Young Larry	Episode: "The Mormon Advantage"
2022	Star Trek: Lower Decks	Ferengi Pit Boss	Voice, episode: "Hear All, Trust Nothing"
2022–2023	Human Resources	Gil, Various roles	Voice, 15 episodes
2023	History of the World, Part II	Joot the Space Dreidel / Zakher	2 episodes
2023	How I Met Your Father	Yoni	Episode: "Working Girls"
2024	Monsters: The Lyle and Erik Menendez Story	Dr. William Vicary	2 episodes
