= Jon Daly =

American actor and comedian (born 1977)

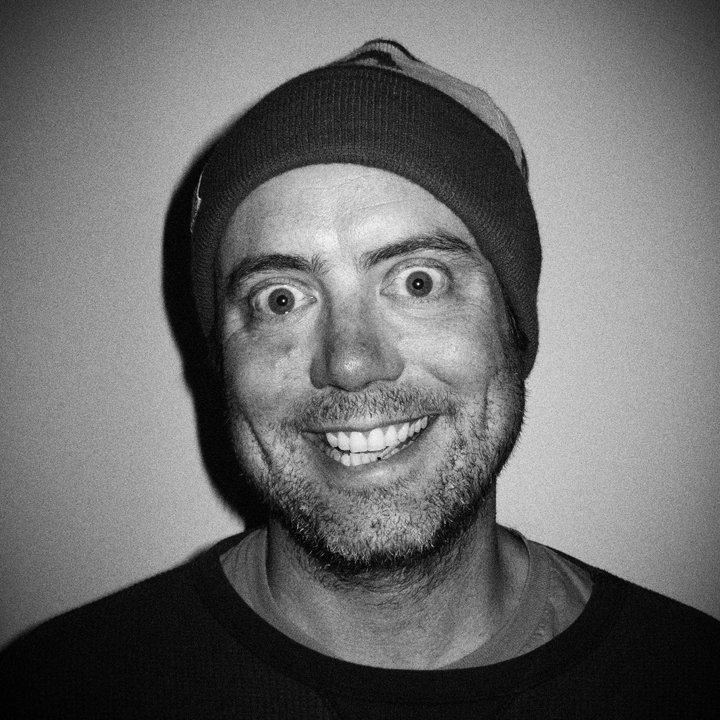
- Born: Jonathan Barney Daly; April 14, 1977 (age 49); Pittsburgh, Pennsylvania, U.S.
- Other names: Jonathan C. Daly; Jon C. Daly
- Occupations: Actor; comedian; writer; producer

Jonathan Barney Daly (born April 14, 1977), sometimes credited as Jonathan C. Daly, Jon C. Daly, or Jon Daly, is an American actor, comedian, writer and producer best known for his sketch comedy work on the Comedy Central series Kroll Show. In 2013, he starred as Hobbes in the Amazon Studios original series Betas, and also played Agent Filippo in Zoolander 2 (2016).

== Early life and education ==
Daly was born and raised in Pittsburgh, Pennsylvania. He first became involved in improv performing in Pittsburgh when he was 16 at a show called "Friday Night Improvs" at the University of Pittsburgh and continued performing while attending the University of North Carolina School of the Arts.

== Career ==
Daly has been a regular performer at the Upright Citizens Brigade Theatre (UCB) for over ten years where he performed in the improv group "Mother". He continues to perform at the theater's Los Angeles division. Some of his notable work at UCB was performing in the sketch groups such as Mother and Mr. A$$ and creating characters such as Sappity Tappity and Bill Cosby-Bukowski. Daly has appeared in films such as The Secret Life of Walter Mitty, Mystery Team, Bride Wars, Blackballed: The Bobby Dukes Story, and College Road Trip. He starred as Hobbes in the Amazon Studios comedy series Betas in 2013 and was also a recurring sketch performer and writer/producer on Comedy Central's Kroll Show.

Daly has had recurring roles on The Life & Times of Tim, Happy Endings, NTSF:SD:SUV::, Drunk History, Family Guy, and IFC's Comedy Bang! Bang!, as well as making guest appearances on comedy programs such as Parks and Recreation (appearing only in the first episode and last episode, six years apart), The Inbetweeners, Key & Peele, Bob's Burgers, Nick Swardson's Pretend Time, and Mr. Neighbor's House. He has also written for the MTV sketch series Human Giant and the Scott Aukerman & B. J. Porter created sketch pilot The Right Now! Show.

Daly and frequent writing partner and collaborator Brett Gelman also performed for many years as the comedy rap duo "Cracked Out". Their EP The Fleetwood Crack was made available for download on their website in 2007. Daly is also a frequent guest on Earwolf podcasts such as Comedy Bang! Bang! and improv4humans. In November 2012, he started his own podcast for the Earwolf network, Rafflecast, which ran for 30 episodes. In 2017, Daly began appearing as Arnie Brown in the Showtime comedy series I'm Dying Up Here.

== Filmography ==
=== Film ===
Year	Title	Role	Notes
2002	13th Child	Anthony	Credited as Jonathan C. Daly
2004	Blackballed: The Bobby Dukes Story	Mayhem Team Member	
2006	This Is Our City	MC Record Deal	Short film; also writer
2006	The Cracktion Movie	MC Record Deal	Short film; also writer
2006	Fukkin' Ya Momz in Da Ass	MC Record Deal	Short film; also writer
2008	Stick It in Detroit	Matt "Wojo" Wojoiechowski	
2008	College Road Trip	Campus Security	
2009	Bride Wars	Head Set	
2009	Mystery Team	Greg	
2009	Ed Hardy Boyz: The Case of the Missing Sick Belt Buckle	Peter Paparazzo	Short film; also writer
2010	Human Centipede Anonymous	Jon	Short film; also writer
2010	My Imaginary Friend is Fabio	Jon Daly	Short film; also writer
2011	BillCosby Bukowski	Bill Cosby	Short film; also writer
2011	Bieber 2051	Future Justin Bieber	Short film; also writer
2011	Ed Hardy Boyz 2: The Case of When That Hot Filipina Girl Lost; Her Tramp Stamp at Mini-Golf	Peter Paparazzo	Short film; writer
2011	Ticklish Cage	Ticklish Cage / Jack Tickleson	Short film; also writer
2011	Engine Block	Harry	Short film
2012	The Sappity Tappity Show	Sappity Tappity	Short film; also writer
2013	OowieWanna	Uncle Richard	Short film
2013	The Secret Life of Walter Mitty	Tim Naughton	
2014	The Horse Raised by Sphere	Needy-Tardy (voice)	Short film
2015	Addicted to Fresno	Boris Lipka	
2015	That Dog	Sprite (voice)	Short film
2016	Hail, Caesar!	Cop at French Postcard House	
2016	Zoolander 2	Agent Flippo	
2016	Masterminds	Detective	
2017	Lemon	Toby	
2017	All Nighter	Jimothy	
2017	Austin Found	Donald Wilson	
2018	Making Babies	Caesar	
2018	A Futile and Stupid Gesture	Bill Murray	
2021	Happily	Donald	
2022	King Tweety	Diego von Schniffenstein (voice)	
2022	Something from Tiffany's	Tattoo Customer	Uncredited
2023	The Donor Party	Reese	
2024	Destroy All Neighbors	Swig	

=== Television ===
Year	Title	Role	Notes
2007	Fat Guy Stuck in Internet	Coffee Burned Co-Worker	Episode: "Threshold"
2007	Nick Cannon Presents: Short Circuitz		Consultant writer
2007–2008	Human Giant	Vroom Vroom / MC Record Deal / Sappity Tappity	2 episodes
2009 & 2015	Parks and Recreation	Drunk / John	2 episodes
2010	The Adventures of Señor Toro	Golfer	Episode: "Automobull"
2010	Players	Meat Stix Fan	Episode: "Mr. Meat Snak Stix"
2010	Nick Swardson's Pretend Time	Batman	Episode: "Monday Morning Meltdown"
2010–2012	The Life & Times of Tim	Various (voice)	14 episodes
2011–2012	NTSF:SD:SUV::	Billy Pittman / Chad	2 episodes
2011–2012	Happy Endings	Brody Daniels	2 episodes
2012	The Inbetweeners	Jed Remis	Episode: "The Field Trip"
2012–2014	Comedy Bang! Bang!	Bill Cosby-Bukowski / The Devil / Barry R.	4 episodes
2013–2014	Betas	Hobbes	11 episodes
2013–2015	Kroll Show	Various	26 episodes; also writer and co-executive producer
2014	Next Time on Lonny	Trent	2 episodes
2014	Drunk History	Kris Kristofferson	Episode: "American Music"
2014	The Meltdown with Jonah and Kumail	Ryan Gosling	Episode: "The One with the Party Fouls"
2014	BoJack Horseman	Additional voices	Episode: "BoJack Horseman: The BoJack Horseman Story, Chapter One"
2014	Newsreaders	Fred Barkley / Johnny Hogwild	Episode: "Headless Football Player; Identity Thief"
2014–2015	The Eric Andre Show		Wrote 10 episodes
2014–2017	Family Guy	Various voices	10 episodes
2015	Regular Show	Teddy, Ore, Stock Broke Guy (voices)	Episode: "Married and Broke"
2015	Man Seeking Woman	Daniel	Episode: "Gavel"
2015	Scheer-RL	Fred Durst	Episode: "Limp Bizkit"
2015	Brooklyn Nine-Nine	Brian Applebaum	Episode: "The Funeral"
2015	Life in Pieces	Steffan	Episode: "Hospital Boudoir Time-Out Namaste"
2015	Long Live the Royals	King Rufus, Knight #3, Bystander (voices)	Miniseries
2015–2016	TripTank	Various voices	4 episodes
2015–2018	Another Period	Officer Kerttrussel O'Kelly	11 episodes
2015–2023	Bob's Burgers	Sasha / various (voice)	6 episodes
2016	Fresh Off the Boat	Ricky	Episode: "Love and Loopholes"
2016	Party Legends	Himself	Episode: "What Are You Into?"
2016	The Adult Swim Golf Classic	John Daly	Television special; also writer and executive producer
2016	Lady Dynamite	Thad	Episode: "I Love You"
2016	Zoolander: Super Model	The Paparocto (voice)	Unknown episodes
2016	The Amazing Gayl Pile	Jeff	2 episodes
2016	Son of Zorn	Tom	Episode: "Return to Orange County"
2016	Mr. Neighbor's House	Terry the Demon	Television special
2016	Andy Richter's Home for the Holidays	Sappity Tappity	Television special
2016–2018	Archer	Whitney Stratton IV, Ivy (voices)	2 episodes
2017	The UCB Show	Actor	Episode: "Twenty GIFs of Gifts"
2017	Jeff & Some Aliens	Chet (voice)	6 episodes
2017	New Girl	Professor PP Hornsyld	Episode: "Rumspringa"
2017	Animals.	Todd (voice)	Episode: "Rats"
2017	Playing House	Duff	Episode: "Paging Doctor Yes Please"
2017	One Mississippi	Donkey	Episode: "Who Do You Think You Are?"
2017	Future Man	Owl	Episode: "A Date with Destiny"
2017	The Fake News with Ted Nelms	Jesse D	Episode: "Episode One"
2017–2018	I'm Dying Up Here	Arnie Brown	18 episodes
2017–2023	American Dad!	Various voices	11 episodes
2017–2025	Big Mouth	Judd Birch / various (voice)	41 episodes
2018	Corporate	Jeff	Episode: "Corporate Retreat"
2018	Into the Dark	Finn	Episode: "Pooka!"
2018	Happy Together	Oliver	Episode: "A Claire-Free Lifestyle"
2019	Those Who Can't	Skaat	Episode: "SKAppily Ever After"
2019–2022	Tuca & Bertie	(voice)	4 episodes
2020	Curb Your Enthusiasm	Mailman	2 episodes
2020	Modern Family	Doug	Episode: "I'm Going to Miss This"
2020	Brews Brothers	Stojan	Episode: "Krachtbal"
2020–2023	Miracle Workers	Dr. Goodman / General Puddin / Dr. Crazybrainz	4 episodes
2021	Solar Opposites	(voice)	Episode: "The Earth Eraser"
2021	Made for Love	Biff Reidelsberger	Episode: "I Want a Lawyer"
2021	M.O.D.O.K.	Super-Adaptoid (voice)	10 episodes
2021	Home Economics	Sweaty Guy	Episode: "Bottle Service, $800 Plus Tip (25% Suggested)"
2021–2023	Ten Year Old Tom	Janitor / various (voice)	7 episodes
2022	Inside Job	Jagg Hand (voice)	Episode: "Brettwork"
2023	History of the World, Part II	Glenn	2 episodes
2024–present	Fallout	Snake Oil Salesman	3 episodes
2024	The Great North	Miami / Tyler (voice)	2 episodes
2025	Twisted Metal	Emperor	Episode: "LZGTBZY"
2026	Regular Show: The Lost Tapes	Grub Gobbler / various (voice)	Episode: "Secret Menu Item"

=== Web series ===
Year	Title	Role	Notes
2018	Pittsburgh Dad	Buzzy DeRocco	Credited as Jon Daly

=== Music videos ===
Year	Artist	Title	Role
2014	Duck Sauce	"NRG"	Dr. Dale Rattington
