= Jak Knight =

American actor (1993–2022)

- Born: Jakim Maulana; November 6, 1993; Seattle, Washington, U.S.
- Died: July 14, 2022 (aged 28); Los Angeles, California, U.S.
- Occupations: Actor; comedian; writer
- Years active: 2014–2022

Jakim Maulana (November 6, 1993 – July 14, 2022), better known by his stage name Jak Knight, was an American actor and stand-up comedian. He was best known for his roles as DeVon in the animated Netflix sitcom Big Mouth and Jak in the Peacock comedy series Bust Down.

== Early life ==
Knight was born as Jakim Maulana in Seattle, Washington, on November 6, 1993.

== Career ==
He appeared in the 2014 movie LieGuys as an iPhone cameraman in his debut acting role.

From 2017 until his death in 2022, he provided the voice of DeVon in the Netflix adult animated sitcom Big Mouth.

In 2020, he provided vocal passages as interludes on Limbo, an album made by hip-hop artist and friend of Knight, Aminé.

In March 2022, four months before his death, he starred in the Peacock comedy series Bust Down, alongside Langston Kerman, Chris Redd and Sam Jay.

== Personal life ==
He resided in Los Angeles.

=== Death ===
On July 14, 2022, Knight was found dead on an embankment in Los Angeles, California, at age 28. His cause of death was determined to be suicide. Many celebrities, including Kumail Nanjiani, Tim Dillon, Max Silvestri, James Adomian, Chance the Rapper, Hannibal Buress, Blake Anderson and Vanessa Ramos, reacted to Knight's death by paying tribute on Twitter.

== Filmography ==
Year	Title	Role	Notes
2014	LieGuys	iPhone camera man	Episode: "Faking a Worldstar Fight"
2017–2022	Big Mouth	DeVon / Tall Guy / Gina's brother #2 (voice)	29 episodes
2021	American Dad!	Stiles (voice)	2 episodes
2021–2022	Pause with Sam Jay	Party regular	13 episodes
2022	Bust Down	Jak	6 episodes; also writer and executive producer
2022	That Damn Michael Che	William	Episode: "Your Past, Your Present"
2023	First Time Female Director	Simon	Posthumous release
