= Seth Morris =

American actor, comedian, and writer

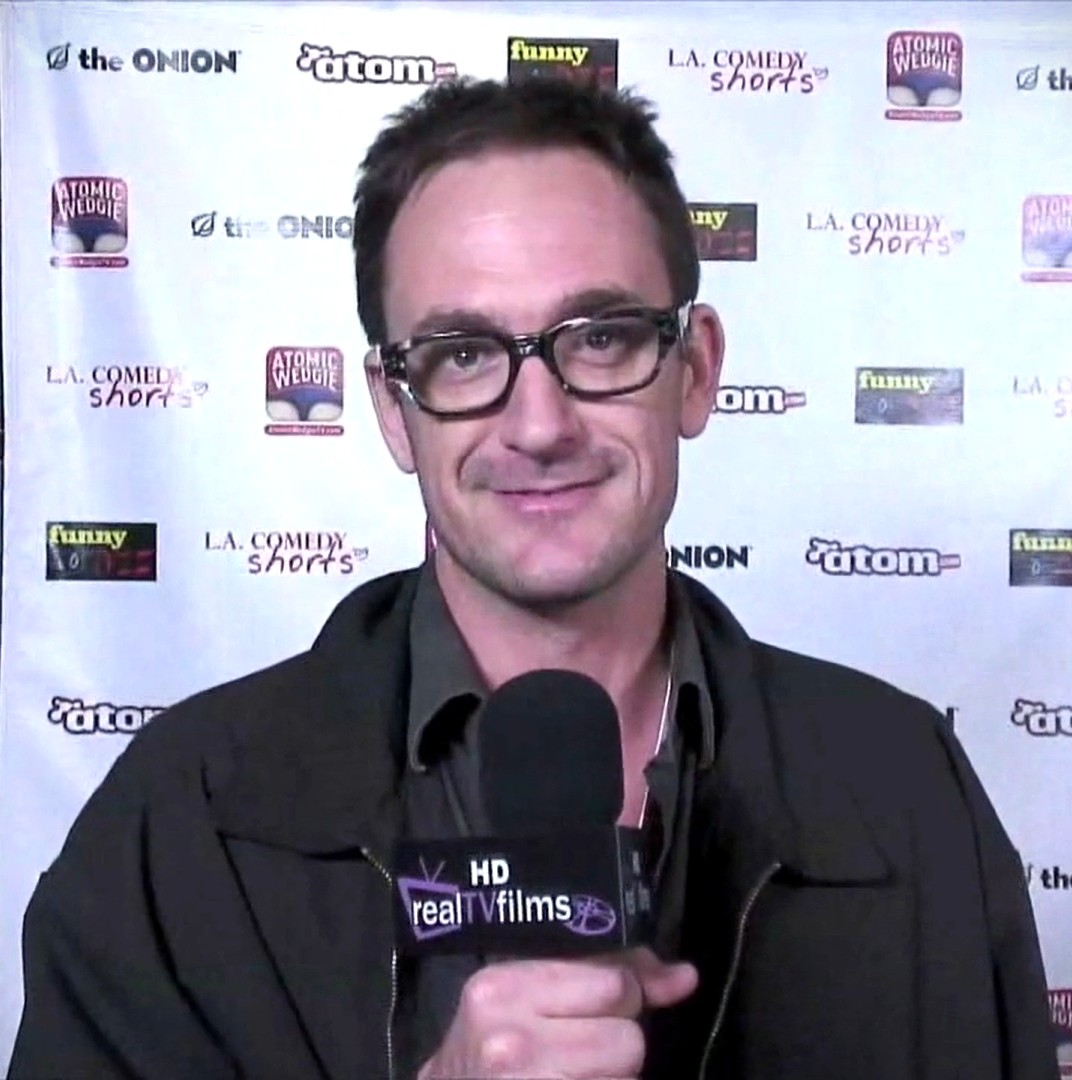
- Morris in 2009
- Born: May 21, 1970 (age 56); Marin County, California, U.S.
- Education: University of California, Santa Cruz
- Occupations: Actor; comedian; writer
- Years active: 1998–present

External image
- Morris in 2012

Seth Morris (born May 21, 1970) is an American actor, comedian, and writer known for his recurring roles on programs such as Go On, Happy Endings, The Hotwives of Orlando, The League, Kroll Show, and Childrens Hospital.

== Early life ==
Morris is originally from Marin County, California, the younger of two boys, and attended Novato High School. After graduating, he began traveling and attended community college. He briefly attended University of California, Santa Cruz and took a six-month bicycling trip across the country, from San Francisco to Florida.

Morris has had numerous odd jobs including caretaking with developmentally disabled people at group homes, teaching kids, and working at a health food and yoga store in New York City.

== Career ==
Morris started a career in comedy after moving to New York City, performing at the Upright Citizens Brigade Theatre (UCB) as an improviser and sketch comedian. He later moved to Los Angeles and became the first Artistic Director of the theater's Los Angeles division for many years and was a member of the four-man sketch group "The Naked Babies" with comedians Rob Corddry, Brian Huskey, and John Ross Bowie. The group appeared at the 1999 Big Stinkin' International Improv & Sketch Comedy Festival in Austin, Texas. After stepping down as artistic director, he started out as the first staff writer hired by Funny or Die.

He wrote and appeared with a recurring role on the Adult Swim series Childrens Hospital. Morris also recurred as Scotty on the ABC comedy series Happy Endings and as Danny on the NBC comedy series Go On. Other programs Morris appeared in regularly included Late Night with Conan O'Brien, the HBO sketch series Funny or Die Presents, and the MTV prank show Damage Control.

Morris has also made numerous guest appearances on comedy programs such as Curb Your Enthusiasm, Parks and Recreation, The League, Reno 911!, Crossballs, It's Always Sunny In Philadelphia, Maron, How I Met Your Mother, Broad City, Big Lake, Human Giant, and Nick Swardson's Pretend Time. He has appeared in films such as The Dictator, Step Brothers, Blackballed: The Bobby Dukes Story, and I Love You, Man. In 2012, Daily Variety reported that Yahoo had announced the comedy project First Dates With Toby Harris, featuring Morris, as part of its original comedy slate for Yahoo Screen.

Morris is a frequent writer and director for the humor website Funny Or Die. He is also known for his regular appearances on the Comedy Bang! Bang! podcast and television series, most often playing Bob Ducca, the hypochondriac ex-stepfather of host Scott Aukerman. Morris also hosted his own podcast on the Earwolf podcasting network, Affirmation Nation with Bob Ducca, which debuted in 2011, ran for 144 episodes, and stopped airing on February 29, 2012. As of October 1, 2014, Affirmation Nation released its first of a new run of episodes. However, on May 6, 2015, he published the last episode of Affirmation Nation. He wrote for the Comedy Central sketch series Kroll Show. Morris has also costarred in the Hulu series The Hotwives of Orlando.

== Filmography ==
=== Film ===
Year	Title	Character	Notes
2004	Blackballed: The Bobby Dukes Story	Crosby Peters	
2008	Step Brothers	Doctor	
2009	I Love You, Man	Barry's Buddy	
2009	Miss March	Boss	
2011	No Strings Attached	Man with Dog	
2011	Cedar Rapids	Uncle Ken	
2011	High Road	Dirty Carl	
2012	The Dictator	Pregnant Woman's Husband	
2012	The Campaign	Confession Husband	
2014	All Stars	Joel Levitan	
2014	A Better You	Massage Therapist	
2015	Hell and Back	Atheist (voice)	
2016	Get a Job	Lon Zimmet	
2017	Bad Match	Ronald Dale	

=== Television ===
Year	Title	Character	Notes
1998–2006	Late Night with Conan O'Brien	Various	
1999	Upright Citizens Brigade	The Real Jesus	Episode: "Spaghetti Jesus"
2002	Contest Searchlight	Hotel Worker	Episode #1.1
2004	Crossballs	Various	Also writer
2005	Love, Inc.	Evan	Episode: "The Honeymooners"
2005	Damage Control	Various	
2007	Human Giant	Steve	Episode: "Kneel Before Zerg"
2007	Cavemen	Sapiens	Episode: "Her Embarrassed of Caveman"
2007–2009	Curb Your Enthusiasm	Dr. Schaffer / ENT Doctor	2 episodes
2008–2015	Childrens Hospital	Dr. Nate Schachter/Tug Spano/Various	9 episodes; also writer
2009	How I Met Your Mother	Director	Episode: "The Possimpible"
2009	Reno 911!	Jesus	Episode: "Stoner Jesus"
2010	Players	Skipper Sunnyside	Episode: "Cumdog Millionaire"
2010	Big Lake	Tre O'Neill	Episode: "The Interview"
2010	It's Always Sunny in Philadelphia	Ted Sally	Episode: "The Gang Buys a Boat"
2010–2011	Funny or Die Presents	Various	4 episodes
2010–2014	The League	Bill Haddock	6 episodes
2011	United States of Tara	Michelle	Episode: "The Full Fuck You Finger"
2011	Traffic Light	Big Dad	Episode: "Bonebag"
2011	NTSF:SD:SUV::	Danny Reboot	Episode: "Piper Doesn't Live Here Anymore"
2011	Nick Swardson's Pretend Time	Mourner	Episode: "PETA Not on Set"
2011	Fred 2: Night of the Living Fred	Mr. Jake Devlin	TV movie
2011–2013	Happy Endings	Scotty	6 episodes
2012, 2015	Comedy Bang! Bang!	Bob Ducca / Nelz Hebber	2 episodes
2012–2013	Go On	Danny	19 episodes
2013	The Greatest Event in Television History	Channon Flowers	Episode: "Too Close for Comfort"
2013–2015	Kroll Show	Bob Ducca, Various Characters	9 episodes; also writer
2014–2015	Parks and Recreation	Mike Patterson	2 episodes
2014	Broad City	John	Episode: "The Last Supper"
2014	The Neighbors	Oscar Walton	Episode: "Close Encounters of the Bird Kind"
2014	You're Whole	Father, Abraham Lincoln	Episode: "Propofol/Telescopes/Abraham Lincoln"
2014–2016	Maron	Jeremy	2 episodes
2014	The Hotwives of Orlando	T.J.	7 episodes
2014	Newsreaders	Westley	Episode: "Roswell, New Mexico; Skip Goes to a Wedding"
2014	Key and Peele	Audience Member #1	Episode: "Sex Addict Wendell"
2015	Bad Judge	Ethan	Episode: "Naked and Afraid"
2015	Workaholics	Landon	Episode: "Dorm Daze"
2015	Brooklyn Nine-Nine	Agent Piln	Episode: "Windbreaker City"
2015	Bob's Burgers	Baker (voice)	Episode: "Eat, Spray, Linda"
2015	The Comedians	Seth from The Seth & Brian Show	Episode: "Orange You the New Black Guy"
2015	The Hotwives of Las Vegas	Tim	Episode: "The Reunion"
2015	Filthy Preppy Teen$	Demon	Episode #1.6
2016–2018	Love	Evan	8 episodes
2016	The UCB Show	Purple Jeff	Episode: "Cock Rings Are No Joke"
2016	Bajillion Dollar Propertie$	Shoshua	Episode: "Amir Is Glenn's Mentor"; also writer, co-executive producer, and director
2016	Modern Family	James	Episode: "The Party"
2016	Lady Dynamite	Director	Episode: "Mein Ramp"
2016–2019	Veep	Bill Jaeger	6 episodes
2016	Wander Over Yonder	Neckbeard (voice)	2 episodes
2016	Take My Wife	Damon	Episode: "Feature"
2016–2018	The Good Place	Wallace	4 episodes
2016	Mary + Jane	The Professor	Episode: "Neighborhood Watch"
2017	Tour de Pharmacy	Mick Porterhouse	TV movie
2017–2025	Big Mouth	Greg Glaser (voice)	28 episodes
2017	Ghosted	Keith	Episode: "Whispers"
2017	Do You Want to See a Dead Body?	Nude Beach Bully 1	Episode: "A Body and an Actor (with Justin Long)"; also writer
2018	Liza on Demand	Rudy	Episode: "Elite Status"
2018	For the People	Michael Gallagher	Episode: "This Is What I Wanted to Say"
2018	Alone Together	James	Episode: "Murder House"
2018	The Conners	Republican Man at Mall	Episode: "The Separation of Church and Dan"
2019	Superstore	ICE Agent Robson	Episode: "Employee Appreciation Day"
2019	American Princess	Bare Your Soul MC	Episode: "Queen, Interrupted"
2019	Mr. Mom	Stan	2 episodes
2019	Black Jesus	Louie	Episode: "The Real Jesus of Compton"
2020–2022	Close Enough	Anders (voice)	5 episodes
2021	The Big Leap	Kevin Perkins	5 episodes
2022	I Love That for You	Carl	Episode: "Impeccable She Casuals"
2022	Star Trek: Lower Decks	Illustor (voice)	Episode: "Crisis Point II: Paradoxus"
2023	History of the World, Part II	Various	3 episodes
2023	Party Down	Ted Fine	Episode: "Once Upon a Time Proms Away Prom-otional Event"
2024	Chicago Med	Paul Moore	Episode: "What Happens in the Dark Always Comes to Light"
2026	Life, Larry and the Pursuit of Unhappiness	Andrew Johnson	Episode: "Lincoln"
