= Brooklyn Nine-Nine season 2 =

Brooklyn Nine-Nine
- Season 2
- DVD cover
- Starring: Andy Samberg; Stephanie Beatriz; Terry Crews; Melissa Fumero; Joe Lo Truglio; Chelsea Peretti; Andre Braugher; Dirk Blocker; Joel McKinnon Miller
- No. of episodes: 23

Release
- Original network: Fox
- Original release: September 28, 2014 – May 17, 2015

Season chronology
- ← Previous; Season 1 Next → Season 3

The second season of the television sitcom Brooklyn Nine-Nine premiered September 28, 2014, on Fox, and ended May 17, 2015, with 23 episodes.

== Summary ==
Jake returns to the precinct after going undercover to help take down the mafia. After struggling to get over his feelings for Amy, he begins a relationship with defense lawyer Sophia Perez, which ends based on their conflicting professions. Amy decides to break up with Teddy due to his dull personality.

Charles and Gina attempt to keep their secret relationship before deciding to expose it to the precinct after Jake and Amy catch them in the act. After ending it, they end up accidentally hooking up Charles' father with Gina's mother. They initially attempt to break it up, but eventually accept it as their parents get married. Meanwhile, Rosa begins a relationship with Holt's nephew Marcus.

Holt engages in a battle of wits with his old colleague turned rival, Deputy Commissioner Madeline Wuntch. She initially tricks him into accepting a high budget to combat a newer drug on the market called "Giggle Pig", but a task force led by Rosa ultimately succeeds in taking down the operation with assistance from Jake and the Pontiac Bandit.

When they eventually stop a high-stakes robbery case with Wuntch's assistance, she reveals she helped them succeed so Holt could become the head of the NYPD Public Affairs Division, resulting in him leaving the Nine-Nine. Amy and Jake kiss while they are on an undercover job and a relationship develops.

== Cast ==
=== Main ===
- Andy Samberg as Detective Jake Peralta
- Stephanie Beatriz as Detective Rosa Diaz
- Terry Crews as Sergeant Terry Jeffords
- Melissa Fumero as Detective Amy Santiago
- Joe Lo Truglio as Detective Charles Boyle
- Chelsea Peretti as Gina Linetti
- Andre Braugher as Captain Raymond Holt

=== Starring ===
- Dirk Blocker as Detective Michael Hitchcock
- Joel McKinnon Miller as Detective Norm Scully

=== Recurring ===
- Kyra Sedgwick as Deputy Commissioner Madelyn Wuntch
- Nick Cannon as Marcus
- Eva Longoria as Sophia Perez
- Stephen Root as Lynn Boyle
- Sandra Bernhard as Darlene Linetti

=== Guest ===
- Jenny Slate as Bianca
- Dan Bakkedahl as Lieutenant Andrew Miller
- Ed Helms as Jack Danger
- Craig Robinson as Doug Judy
- Nick Kroll as Agent Kendrick
- Garret Dillahunt as Detective Dave Majors
- Bradley Whitford as Captain Roger Peralta
- Chris Parnell as Geoffrey Hoytsman
- Makayla Lysiak as Tricia

== Episodes ==
Season 2 episodes
No. overall	No. in season	Title	Directed by	Written by	Original release date	Prod. code	U.S. viewers (millions)
23	1	"Undercover"	Dean Holland	Luke Del Tredici	September 28, 2014	201	5.46
Jake makes a triumphant return from his undercover assignment with the FBI, but when he discovers one of his targets had made an escape, he goes back undercover with help from Boyle to complete the mission. Amy is still dating Teddy, so Jake tells her that he didn’t mean what he said earlier about him liking her. Captain Holt forces Amy and Rosa to do a series of drills involving Terry acting out various scenarios, without explaining why. Gina is worried Boyle will tell Jake about their tryst together, but he manages not to out of fear of Gina.
24	2	"Chocolate Milk"	Fred Goss	Gabe Liedman	October 5, 2014	202	3.31
Jake steps in to help Terry when he has a key medical appointment to get a vasectomy, but quickly becomes frustrated when Terry denies his true feelings and insists Jake is just "a work friend, not a friend-friend." Captain Holt's fears about the NYPD's reorganization are realized when his old adversary Madeleine Wuntch, now the Deputy Commissioner shows up to conduct a critical review of the 99th's competence. Boyle scrambles for a date to the engagement party of his ex-wife and her boyfriend (who are also his landlords) until Diaz steps in to help him out. Jake tries to get Terry out of his vasectomy after Terry confesses that he doesn’t want it.
25	3	"The Jimmy Jab Games"	Rebecca Asher	Lakshmi Sundaram	October 12, 2014	203	4.51
The combination of a travel delay for the soon-arriving Serbian President's motorcade and a meeting for Captain Holt and Terry at 1 Police Plaza leads to a wacky competition amongst the detectives known as the Jimmy Jab Games (so named because of Peralta's misunderstanding of former Iranian President Mahmoud Ahmadinejad's name). Peralta wants the number of Rosa's attractive friend, while Gina orders Boyle to snatch a tape from an oblivious but ultimately vindictive Hitchcock. Holt and Wuntch's feud spirals forward when they fight over funding to investigate a new drug showing up in the precinct named 'Gigglepig'. Jake realizes that he still has feelings for Amy and lets her win the Jimmy Jabs. Rosa gives her friend Katie’s number to Jake even after his loss to help him move on.
26	4	"Halloween II"	Eric Appel	Prentice Penny	October 19, 2014	204	5.22
Eager to engage in another Halloween bet following Peralta's win the previous year, Peralta and Holt raise the stakes, and Jake enlists a repeat offender to help snag the captain's watch before midnight, or he will have to do five weekends of free overtime – the actual outcome. Meanwhile, Amy and Rosa are upset when Terry doesn't punish Gina for skipping out on her duties at the precinct to attend dance practice. It is revealed that Gina has been secretly going back to college which has caused her to miss dance rehearsals. The Halloween bet takes a turn when Jake and Boyle try to retrieve Holt’s watch that “Fingers” stole. In the end Holt wins the bet and reveals that he has been planning the revenge ever since his defeat last year.
27	5	"The Mole"	Victor Nelli, Jr.	Laura McCreary	November 2, 2014	205	3.41
When an internal affairs investigator arrives with news regarding a possible mole in the precinct, Jake and Holt race to discover the mole before Wuntch does. Meanwhile, Rosa and Terry infiltrate a silent disco to find "Giggle Pig" suppliers and get a win for the task force, and Jake and Amy stumble upon Boyle and Gina's dirty little secret.
28	6	"Jake and Sophia"	Michael McDonald	Tricia McAlpin & David Phillips	November 9, 2014	206	3.99
Eager to join the dating pool, Jake hits it off with a woman named Sophia who later reveals herself to be the attorney defending a perp Jake arrested. Rosa urges Amy to run for union rep to replace the incompetent Scully, and Charles and Gina fight over a non-refundable hotel room reservation they made before ending their affair.
29	7	"Lockdown"	Linda Mendoza	Luke Del Tredici	November 16, 2014	208	4.53
Jake is given command of the precinct when Holt and Terry are called to a meeting. When a mysterious powder puts the precinct on lockdown, Jake struggles to maintain morale while Amy insists he be forthright about the situation. While Holt and Terry monitor the situation from Terry's home, Terry tries to appease his brother-in-law by claiming Holt is overbearing.
30	8	"USPIS"	Ken Whittingham	Brian Reich	November 23, 2014	207	3.04
When Rosa gives Jake a new lead on "Giggle Pig", he and Charles are forced to contend with a self-righteous and incompetent U.S. Postal Inspection Service agent. Holt, Terry, and Gina attempt to help Amy with her cigarette addiction.
31	9	"The Road Trip"	Beth McCarthy-Miller	Brigitte Munoz-Liebowitz	November 30, 2014	209	3.11
When Jake and Amy have to stay at a B&B in upstate New York on a work trip, Jake invites Sophia to share the evening with him, arranging for Teddy to join Amy as well, but his surprise backfires when he discovers that Amy is planning to break up with Teddy, which causes problems not only for Amy and Teddy but also for Jake and Sophia. Meanwhile, Boyle struggles to teach Holt how to properly cook for his anniversary breakfast with Kevin, and Terry and Gina struggle to convince a very sick Rosa that she should go home.
32	10	"The Pontiac Bandit Returns"	Max Winkler	Matt O'Brien	December 7, 2014	210	4.32
Jake and Rosa manage to capture the Pontiac Bandit, Doug Judy, who negotiates a deal in exchange for information on the ringleader of the Giggle Pig ring, Tito Ruiz. Meanwhile, Charles and Gina discover a Christmas gift from Charles' father to Gina's mother, and determine to sabotage their parents' relationship. While making a collage for Capt. Holt, Amy discovers a mistake in one of the Captain's past cases.
33	11	"Stakeout"	Tristram Shapeero	Laura McCreary & Tricia McAlpin	December 14, 2014	211	3.52
A lead on Ukrainian mob activities leads Jake and Boyle to set up a stakeout that ends up covering eight days—and also causes escalating conflicts between the two "roommates". Elsewhere, Amy and Gina react strongly when they find out they're the basis for characters in a book Terry wrote for his daughters, while Rosa and Holt go from basking in commendations for the Giggle Pig task force to being uneasy about Rosa's new relationship with Holt's nephew Marcus.
34	12	"Beach House"	Tim Kirkby	Lakshmi Sundaram & David Phillips	January 4, 2015	212	6.12
Charles brings the detectives to his ex-wife’s beach house for another detectives-only fun weekend, but Jake invites Captain Holt along, since he learns that, because of his sexuality, Holt never was invited to any party while on the NYPD. However, because of Holt's old fashioned manners, the weekend soon becomes dull. Meanwhile, Gina wants to know which personality Amy becomes after a 6th drink.
35	13	"Payback"	Victor Nelli, Jr.	Norm Hiscock & Brigitte Munoz-Liebowitz	January 11, 2015	213	3.29
When Terry asks Jake to pay back an amount of money he owes him, Jake finds out that Terry and his wife are expecting another child. Jake endeavors to settle all of his debts with his coworkers in an effort to preserve Terry's secret. He ends up selling his beloved car to pay back Terry, which earns him the title of godfather despite him revealing the secret to everyone. Meanwhile, Amy is ecstatic to work a case with Captain Holt until he solves it almost immediately and she gives him food poisoning.
36	14	"The Defense Rests"	Jamie Babbit	Prentice Penny & Matt O'Brien	January 25, 2015	214	2.79
When Sophia's job gets in the way of her relationship with Jake, Jake tries to smooth things over with her boss but ends up having to arrest him after finding him taking cocaine. Meanwhile, Wuntch needs Holt's help for a job recommendation, and Charles tries to get Gina's blessing for their parents' wedding.
37	15	"Windbreaker City"	Craig Zisk	Gabe Liedman	February 8, 2015	215	2.59
The Nine-Nine are the only non-federal agency invited to the annual Inter-Agency Anti-Terrorism Drill. The squad turns the tables on Homeland Security, with Jake trying to get over Sophia, and Rosa and Amy competing for a weekend off. Meanwhile, Holt gets upset when he and Gina get the same score on a psychiatric evaluation as he believes he is better than her.
38	16	"The Wednesday Incident"	Claire Scanlon	Laura McCreary	February 15, 2015	216	2.08
Captain Holt is in a bad mood, and Jake teams up with Kevin and Gina in an attempt to prove it isn't his fault and ends up finding out that he was stabbed. Meanwhile, Charles tries to get a confession out of a geriatric suspect who pretends to be senile and adorable whenever Amy and Rosa are around.
39	17	"Boyle-Linetti Wedding"	Dean Holland	Matt O'Brien	March 1, 2015	217	3.61
On the day of the wedding of Charles' father and Gina's mother, the squad is forced to deal with various mishaps, like Jake and Amy leaving to pursue a perp and Jake losing the rings in the scuffle, and Charles' dad getting cold feet.
40	18	"Captain Peralta"	Eric Appel	Dan Goor	March 8, 2015	218	3.11
Jake's father, an air-line pilot, comes to visit and it is revealed that he is battling a drug-smuggling charge in Canada. Jake, Boyle and a French-fluent Scully travel to Quebec to investigate the situation. Captain Holt gives the rest of the detectives a brain-teaser that not even he can solve.
41	19	"Sabotage"	Jay Karas	Brian Reich	March 15, 2015	219	2.96
Jake becomes the victim of a series of unfortunate events, including a failed drug test that results in his suspension, and suspects that someone is deliberately targeting him, who turns out to be Sophia's ex-boss who wants revenge on Jake for ruining his life. Rosa and Amy are assigned to investigate. Holt and Terry must find a way to reassure Gina that her dance troupe is important after missing one of her performances. Meanwhile, with Jake suspended, Boyle gets a helping hand on his case from Scully and Hitchcock, who might be more competent than they have led others to believe.
42	20	"AC/DC"	Linda Mendoza	Kylie Condon	April 26, 2015	222	2.78
Jake injures himself on a case but he still tries to catch the perpetrator against Terry's advice. He tricks Charles to go with him on a vacation but takes him to a motel instead where they try to pursue the criminal. Terry tracks them down and tries to take them home but Jake pursues the criminal and gets hit by a car, injuring himself severely. Rosa, Amy and Gina are invited to Captain Holt's house for dinner. But things go awry and Amy and Gina end up getting drunk.
43	21	"Det. Dave Majors"	Michael McDonald	Gabe Liedman & Lakshmi Sundaram	May 3, 2015	220	2.72
Both Jake and Amy are assigned to a case which is being handled by a veteran detective from major crimes, Detective Majors. After working a day on the case, he takes Jake to "Cop Only" bar where he tells him that he plans to ask Amy out after the case is wrapped up. Jake tries to ask Amy out before the case but he fails. Back at the precinct, a manager from a private security firm comes to talk to Terry about the job application. Charles and Gina realize that Terry is planning to leave the police force and they try to persuade him to stay.
44	22	"The Chopper"	Phil Traill	Tricia McAlpin & David Phillips	May 10, 2015	221	2.56
Jake and Boyle are assigned to a high-profile bank robber case with Wuntch's full support. Holt becomes extremely suspicious of Wuntch's motives and gets involved in the case himself to stop Jake from messing it up. Back at the precinct, Gina, Amy and Rosa help Terry in conducting a field trip for children and end up traumatizing them.
45	23	"Johnny and Dora"	Dean Holland	Luke Del Tredici	May 17, 2015	223	2.35
Jake and Amy have to go undercover to catch an identity thief, an assignment that brings them uncomfortably closer, but they finally get together after Holt's sudden departure by kissing in the filing room. Meanwhile, Captain Holt searches for a letter to give him the upper hand over Wuntch and prevent his upcoming promotion, which unfortunately doesn't work and he ends up having to say an emotional goodbye to the squad.

== Reception ==
=== Critical response ===
The second season received critical acclaim. The review aggregator website Rotten Tomatoes reports a 100% approval rating, with an average score of 7.96/10, based on 17 reviews. The website's consensus reads, "Brooklyn Nine-Nine's winning cast, appealing characters and wacky gags make it good comfort food."

=== Awards and nominations ===
Award	Date of ceremony	Category	Recipients and nominees	Result
Screen Actors Guild Awards	January 21, 2015	Outstanding Performance by an Ensemble in a Comedy Series	Brooklyn Nine-Nine	Nominated
NAACP Image Award	February 6, 2015	Outstanding Actor in a Comedy Series	Andre Braugher	Nominated
NAACP Image Award	February 6, 2015	Outstanding Supporting Actor in a Comedy Series	Terry Crews	Nominated
Satellite Awards	February 15, 2015	Best Television Series, Comedy or Musical	Brooklyn Nine-Nine	Nominated
NHMC Impact Awards	February 20, 2015	Outstanding Achievements and Contributions to the Positive Portrayals of Latinos in Media	Melissa Fumero	Won
GLAAD Media Awards	March 21, 2015	Outstanding Comedy Series	Brooklyn Nine-Nine	Nominated
Teen Choice Awards	August 16, 2015	Choice TV Actor: Comedy	Andy Samberg	Nominated
Imagen Awards	August 21, 2015	Best Supporting Actress – Television	Melissa Fumero	Nominated
Imagen Awards	August 21, 2015	Best Primetime Television Program – Comedy	Brooklyn Nine-Nine	Nominated
Creative Arts Emmy Awards	September 12, 2015	Outstanding Stunt Coordination for a Comedy Series or Variety Program	Brooklyn Nine-Nine	Won
67th Primetime Emmy Awards	September 20, 2015	Outstanding Supporting Actor in a Comedy Series	Andre Braugher	Nominated
People's Choice Awards	January 6, 2016	Favorite Comedic TV Actor	Andy Samberg	Nominated
