= The Mole (Brooklyn Nine-Nine) =

- Brooklyn Nine-Nine episode
- Episode no.: Season 2 Episode 5
- Directed by: Victor Nelli, Jr.
- Written by: Laura McCreary
- Cinematography by: Giovani Lampassi
- Editing by: Sandra Montiel
- Production code: 205
- Original air date: November 2, 2014
- Running time: 22 minutes

Guest appearances
- Kyra Sedgwick as Madeline Wuntch; Marc Evan Jackson as Kevin Cozner; Dan Bakkedahl as Andrew Miller

Episode chronology
← Previous "Halloween II"	Next → "Jake and Sophia"
- Brooklyn Nine-Nine season 2

"The Mole" is the fifth episode of the second season of the American television police sitcom series Brooklyn Nine-Nine. It is the 27th overall episode of the series and is written by Laura McCreary and directed by Victor Nelli, Jr. It aired on Fox in the United States on November 2, 2014.

The show revolves around the fictitious 99th precinct of the New York Police Department in Brooklyn and the officers and detectives that work in the precinct. Jake Peralta (Andy Samberg) is an immature yet a very talented detective in the precinct with an astounding record of crimes solved, putting him in a competition with fellow detective Amy Santiago (Melissa Fumero). The precinct's status changes when the Captain is retiring and a new commanding officer, Cpt. Raymond Holt (Andre Braugher) is appointed as the newest Captain. This creates a conflict between Jake and Holt over their respective methods in the field. In the episode, Jake and Holt are looking for a mole who is seemingly retrieving information from the offices. However, Jake becomes concerned as he retrieved some files and worries he will become a prime suspect in the case. Meanwhile, Terry and Rosa go undercover to a silent disco to investigate the new drug.

The episode was seen by an estimated 3.41 million household viewers and gained a 1.7/4 ratings share among adults aged 18–49, according to Nielsen Media Research. The episode received mostly positive reviews from critics, who praised the performances, especially Braugher's as well as the writing. For his performance in the episode, Braugher was nominated for a Primetime Emmy Award for Outstanding Supporting Actor in a Comedy Series.

== Plot ==
The precinct is visited by Lt. Miller (Dan Bakkedahl) from Internal Affairs, who is investigating a mole who has been passing information to criminal organizations. Jake (Andy Samberg) realizes that he left some case files in his apartment, and asks Amy (Melissa Fumero) for help in retrieving them.

After being teased by Wuntch (Kyra Sedgwick), Holt (Andre Braugher) assigns Terry (Terry Crews) and Rosa (Stephanie Beatriz) to lead an investigation into a silent disco which may have customers using "Giggle Pig". Terry becomes paranoid when he worries about the future of his daughters after finding out that a dealer in the disco attended their school, but Rosa reassures him that they will turn out well with him as their father.

Jake and Amy stop by Gina's (Chelsea Peretti) apartment (which previously belonged to Jake) to retrieve files but they run into her and Boyle (Joe Lo Truglio) about to have sex. Jake takes the files to the precinct but is caught by Miller, who accuses him of being the mole and suspends him. After working with Holt all night to catch the mole, Jake finally realizes that Miller is just in the precinct to get information for Wuntch, as she can't access it. They confront her and blackmail her to leave the precinct alone. Gina later reveals her relationship with Boyle to the whole precinct as Amy made her realize the rest of them would quickly get over it after the initial shock.

== Reception ==
=== Viewers ===
In its original American broadcast, "The Mole" was seen by an estimated 3.41 million household viewers and gained a 1.7/4 ratings share among adults aged 18–49, according to Nielsen Media Research. This was a 35% decrease in viewership from the previous episode, which was watched by 5.22 million viewers with a 2.5/7 in the 18-49 demographics. This means that 1.7 percent of all households with televisions watched the episode, while 4 percent of all households watching television at that time watched it. With these ratings, Brooklyn Nine-Nine was the second most watched show on FOX for the night, beating Mulaney and Bob's Burgers but behind The Simpsons, sixth on its timeslot and fifth for the night, behind Madam Secretary, The Simpsons, Once Upon a Time, 60 Minutes, and NBC Sunday Night Football.

=== Critical reviews ===
"The Mole" received mostly positive reviews from critics. LaToya Ferguson of The A.V. Club gave the episode an "A−" grade and wrote, "'The Mole' is one of those episodes of television where, even though it hits all of its beats well and to satisfaction, there's every chance that extending the episode would somehow make it even stronger. Remember when NBC would 'Super Size' its sitcoms? Unlike those shows, Brooklyn Nine-Nine could actually benefit even more from that."

Jackson McHenry of Entertainment Weekly wrote, "The cops on Brooklyn Nine-Nine catch criminals, but the show spent this week tripping up its characters. The episode ran on basic sitcom rules and structures, but it ran on all cylinders, and it was a lot of fun." Allie Pape from Vulture gave the show a 3 star rating out of 5 and wrote, "'The Mole' is dead-set on pushing several different plotlines forward, but it may have bitten off more than it can chew for one episode, as a lot of the jokes this go-round feel tired. (A guy so germophobic, he can’t touch anyone? A “good” kid secretly selling drugs? Wrecking someone's new car via a powdered doughnut? B99, you can do better.) Even the overall premise is based around a cliché: The 'somebody's been lying and everyone's under suspicion' episode is a long-standing tradition in sitcom culture, one that's been yielding diminishing returns in recent years."

Alan Sepinwall of HitFix wrote, "I feel like season 2 still has yet to find a higher gear and give us an episode (or, better, run of episodes) as great as we saw the show could be last season, but each outing has been fun and smart, and 'The Mole' did a strong job with all three plots." Andy Crump of Paste gave the episode an 8.4 and wrote, "There's a lot to laugh about here - Samberg's climactic 'whaaaaaaaa' and Terry's headphone check in the silent disco in particular, but Melissa Fumero's line-read of her texting history with Gina is probably the funniest non-Braugher moment 'The Mole' has to offer. Since Brooklyn Nine-Nine's premiere, we've known that Braugher is its secret weapon; now we have proof that he's one of its essential building blocks. But more than that, 'The Mole' reminds us of just how good the show can be when it puts one of its supporting troupe members on center stage, and lets Samberg sit in the passenger seat. (Unless he's spilling powdered donuts on the dash)."
