= Stakeout (disambiguation) =

A stakeout is the hidden surveillance of a location or person for the purpose of gathering evidence

Stakeout or Stake Out may also refer to:

== Film and TV ==
- Stakeout (1958 film), a Japanese drama film by Yoshitarō Nomura
- Stakeout (1987 film), a detective/comedy film starring Richard Dreyfuss and Emilio Estevez
- Stakeout (2013 film) or Cold Eyes, a South Korean crime film
- Stake Out (game show), a 2001 British programme
- Stakeout (Transformers), a fictional character from the Transformer universe

Episodes

- "Stakeout" (Amphibia)
- "Stakeout" (Brooklyn Nine-Nine)
- "Stake Out" (The Professionals)
- "The Stakeout" (Inside No. 9)
- "The Stakeout" (The Legend of Korra)
- "The Stakeout" (Parks and Recreation)
- "The Stake Out" (Seinfeld)

== Other uses ==
- Stakeout, crime novel by Parnell Hall (writer) 2013
- The Ithaca 37 Stakeout shotgun, a shortened, pistol grip version of the normal Ithaca Model 37 shotgun
- The process of staking out a construction site in construction surveying.
