= USPIS (disambiguation) =

USPIS is an acronym for the United States Postal Inspection Service.

USPIS may also refer to:

- "USPIS" (Brooklyn Nine-Nine), episode of the TV series
- UN/LOCODE:USPIS, for Port Isabel, Texas
