= Windbreaker City =

- Brooklyn Nine-Nine episode
- Episode no.: Season 2 Episode 15
- Directed by: Craig Zisk
- Written by: Gabe Liedman
- Cinematography by: Giovani Lampassi
- Editing by: Sandra Montiel
- Production code: 215
- Original air date: February 8, 2015
- Running time: 22 minutes

Guest appearances
- Nick Kroll as Agent Kendrick; Eva Longoria as Sophia Perez; Seth Morris as Agent Piln

Episode chronology
← Previous "The Defense Rests"	Next → "The Wednesday Incident"
- Brooklyn Nine-Nine season 2

"Windbreaker City" is the fifteenth episode of the second season of the American television police sitcom series Brooklyn Nine-Nine. It is the 37th overall episode of the series and is written by Gabe Liedman and directed by Craig Zisk. It aired on Fox in the United States on February 8, 2015.

The show revolves around the fictitious 99th precinct of the New York Police Department in Brooklyn and the officers and detectives that work in the precinct. In the episode, the precinct takes part in the annual Inter-Agency Anti-Terrorism Drill. The precinct is the only non-federal agency to attend. They are met with hostility, as they're seen as inferiors by the Department of Homeland Security, which prompts them to break character from their roles as hostages for a Die Hard-style takeover of the drill. Meanwhile, Holt finds out he has the same score as Gina's in a psychological test, while Rosa and Amy compete for a weekend off.

The episode was seen by an estimated 2.59 million household viewers and gained a 1.2/3 ratings share among adults aged 18–49, according to Nielsen Media Research. The episode received positive reviews from critics, who praised the cast and Nick Kroll's performance although some felt it felt repetitive to Tactical Village.

== Plot ==
Terry (Terry Crews) announces that as part of the United States Department of Homeland Security (DHS), the precinct has been offered a place in the annual Inter-Agency Anti-Terrorism Drill, being the only non-federal agency to be invited. Throughout the day, Jake (Andy Samberg) keeps waiting for a text message from Sophia (Eva Longoria), who ended their relationship in the previous episode.

Arriving at the drill, the precinct is welcomed with hostility from Agent Kendrick (Nick Kroll), the DHS leader. The precinct is given the role of hostages, which disappoints them. Jake convinces the others to fight back against the designated terrorists, in the style of Die Hard. After managing to take out the designated terrorists, Charles convinces the others to take on the remaining federal agents. Jake and Kendrick then get into an argument, and decide to compete for who will be the last man standing. After only Jake and Kendrick are left, Kendrick pretends to surrender, but shoots a paintball at Jake using a gun taped to his back in the style of John McClane. As a result of their rebellion, the precinct are banned by Kendrick from future exercises.

Meanwhile, Amy (Melissa Fumero) and Rosa (Stephanie Beatriz) compete to get a weekend off work. Deciding to use the drill as an opportunity, Amy shoots Rosa, only to be shot herself. Afterwards, Amy lets Rosa have the weekend, as Rosa wants her parents to meet Marcus. Holt (Andre Braugher) decides to take Gina's (Chelsea Peretti) psychological test and is stunned to find they have the same score.

== Reception ==
=== Viewers ===
In its original American broadcast, "Windbreaker City" was seen by an estimated 2.59 million household viewers and gained a 1.2/3 ratings share among adults aged 18–49, according to Nielsen Media Research. This was a slight decrease in viewership from the previous episode, which was watched by 2.79 million viewers with a 1.2/3 in the 18-49 demographics. This means that 1.2 percent of all households with televisions watched the episode, while 3 percent of all households watching television at that time watched it. With these ratings, Brooklyn Nine-Nine was the third most watched show on FOX for the night, beating Bob's Burgers, but behind The Simpsons and Family Guy, third on its timeslot and sixth for the night, behind The Simpsons, Family Guy, America's Funniest Home Videos, 60 Minutes and the 57th Annual Grammy Awards.

=== Critical reviews ===
"Windbreaker City" received positive reviews from critics. LaToya Ferguson of The A.V. Club gave the episode an "A" grade and wrote, "'Windbreaker City' is an excellent title for an episode, as it's the name of my imaginary crime novel about crooked cops and the men and women who love them. At least, that's the first thing that popped into my mind upon reading the episode title, not that it would be out of the realm of possibilities for Brooklyn Nine-Nine." Allie Pape from Vulture gave the show a 4 star rating out of 5 and wrote, "For a show that once had action-comedy aspirations but has pretty much gone full workplace comedy at this point (not a bad thing, by any means), this episode is a bit of a throwback."

Alan Sepinwall of HitFix wrote, "Still, some amusing moments (I liked the running gag about Boyle's dog being consigned to Hell), plus Nick Kroll got to pull the duct-taped gun trick (setting up the later moment where Jake and Sophia are back to viewing the other as Hans Gruber). Not bad, but they've done this exact episode better before." Andy Crump of Paste gave the episode a 7.8 and wrote, "'Windbreaker City' is a terrific diversion. Sometimes, that's all an episode needs to be; fun, energetic, nicely shot, and absolutely hilarious. Everyone gets to be who they're supposed to be, whether it's Peralta cajoling everyone into taking his ill-advised lead, Boyle acting creepy in ways that only Boyle can, Terry going ham over a perceived slight on his physique, Amy doing her power poses, or Rosa playing with her cards close to the vest."
