= The Pontiac Bandit Returns =

- Brooklyn Nine-Nine episode
- Episode no.: Season 2 Episode 10
- Directed by: Max Winkler
- Written by: Matt O'Brien
- Cinematography by: Giovani Lampassi
- Editing by: Cortney Carrillo; Sandra Montiel
- Production code: 210
- Original air date: December 7, 2014
- Running time: 22 minutes

Guest appearances
- Craig Robinson as Doug Judy; Stephen Root as Lynn Boyle; Sandra Bernhard as Darlene Linetti; Luis Moncada as Tito Ruiz (Note: Credited as "Randall".)

Episode chronology
← Previous "The Road Trip"	Next → "Stakeout"
- Brooklyn Nine-Nine season 2

"The Pontiac Bandit Returns" is the tenth episode of the second season of the American television police sitcom series Brooklyn Nine-Nine. It is the 32nd overall episode of the series and is written by Matt O'Brien and directed by Max Winkler. It aired on Fox in the United States on December 7, 2014. The episode guest stars Craig Robinson, Stephen Root, Sandra Bernhard, and Luis Moncada.

The show revolves around the fictitious 99th precinct of the New York Police Department in Brooklyn and the officers and detectives that work in the precinct. In the episode, the Pontiac Bandit (Robinson) is finally arrested but he reveals he has inner information regarding the Giggle Pig ring and seeks special treatment in exchange for his cooperation. Meanwhile, Santiago (Melissa Fumero) finds Holt (Andre Braugher) may have made a mistake during one of his earlier cases, and Boyle (Joe Lo Truglio) and Gina (Chelsea Peretti) find out something regarding their parents' (Root and Bernhard) relationship.

The episode was seen by an estimated 4.32 million household viewers and gained a 2.1/6 ratings share among adults aged 18–49, according to Nielsen Media Research. The episode received critical acclaim from critics, who praised Jake's and Judy's dynamic and chemistry, as well as Craig Robinson's performance.

== Plot ==
Posing as a Santa, Jake (Andy Samberg) manages to catch Doug Judy (Craig Robinson) with the help of Rosa (Stephanie Beatriz). However, Doug Judy seeks special treatment as he possesses information regarding the ringleader behind the Giggle Pig ring, Tito Ruiz. Despite Jake's skepticism, Holt (Andre Braugher) and Rosa accept his offer.

Judy demands special treatment such as getting an expensive hotel room, meal, and Rosa being nice to him. Jake becomes paranoid at every opportunity, sensing Judy could escape, but Judy shrugs it off. Jake, Rosa, and Judy arrive at Tito's sting, where they prove their loyalty by having Jake break into a car. After meeting Tito, they raid the Giggle Pig warehouse with operatives. Jake catches Judy as he attempts to escape, but is forced to let him go when he sees Tito is fleeing. Jake catches Tito, but Judy escapes. Boyle (Joe Lo Truglio) shows Gina (Chelsea Peretti) a Christmas gift that his father intended to give her mother. They open the gift and find out it is a digital scale. Later, while dining with their parents, they find out their parents are planning to move in together. Afterward, Boyle and Gina decide to work together on dismantling their relationship.

Meanwhile, Holt (Andre Braugher) invites everyone to a Christmas celebration, but maintains a strict "no gift" policy. Nevertheless, Amy (Melissa Fumero) creates a collage focused on Holt's cases and accomplishments. However, while investigating, she finds out that one of his cases involving an arsonist may end up as a mistake, as the arsonist could be innocent of several of the fires they were charged with. Despite trepidations, Amy reports the mistake to Holt. Holt then explains to her that he does not accept gifts because he does not like bootlickers, but having a mistake like this pointed is the opposite of that, and asks her to help him investigate the case.

== Reception ==
=== Viewers ===
In its original American broadcast, "The Pontiac Bandit Returns" was seen by an estimated 4.32 million household viewers and gained a 2.1/6 ratings share among adults aged 18–49, according to Nielsen Media Research. This was a slight increase in viewership from the previous episode, which was watched by 3.11 million viewers with a 1.4/3 in the 18-49 demographics. This means that 2.1 percent of all households with televisions watched the episode, while 6 percent of all households watching television at that time watched it. With these ratings, Brooklyn Nine-Nine was the third most watched show on FOX for the night, beating Bob's Burgers but behind Family Guy and The Simpsons, fourth on its timeslot and fifth for the night, behind Family Guy, The Simpsons, Football Night in America, and NBC Sunday Night Football.

=== Critical reviews ===
"The Pontiac Bandit Returns" received critical acclaim from critics. LaToya Ferguson of The A.V. Club gave the episode an "A" grade and wrote, "'The Pontiac Bandit Returns' finally provides this season of Brooklyn Nine-Nine with a sequel episode that works just as well, if not better, than the original, while also adding a little something new to the equation."

Jackson McHenry of Entertainment Weekly wrote, "Brooklyn Nine-Nine's a show about detectives, which means it's a show about people who are fundamentally unforgiving. Sure, the members of its police squad have a lot of fun, but they're ultimately there to bag thieves and solve crimes—not let people off easy. So the funny thing about the Pontiac Bandit, a.k.a. Doug Judy (a.k.a. actor Craig Robinson of The Office, who returns this week after his stellar episode last season), is that he's the most relaxed character on Brooklyn Nine-Nine." Allie Pape from Vulture gave the show a perfect 5 star rating out of 5 and wrote, "I like the Brooklyn Nine-Nine I have, and I'm sure an entire galaxy of lovable, irascible perps might end up becoming grating, but Robinson's endearing-slacker vibe melds so perfectly with Peralta's (and plays so beautifully off Rosa's sullen deadpan) that it's hard to resist wanting him to be in every episode."

Alan Sepinwall of HitFix wrote, "The original Pontiac Bandit episode was a highlight of season 1, and it wasn't surprising in the least that Schur, Goor and company would want Craig Robinson to come back and goof around some more with Andy Samberg. What makes the Jake/Doug rivalry work so well is how fundamentally good-natured Doug is, and how simpatico these two men are; if they weren't on opposite sides of the law, it'd be easy to imagine them as best friends." Andy Crump of Paste gave the episode a 9.0 and wrote, "Brooklyn Nine-Nine has built up a head of steam as it heads into its winter break, and continues to balance a number of different threads and relationships along the way. In light of the second season's uneven start, that newfound inertia is as noticeable as it is welcome. Between drug busts and wacky fun, the show has found its stride once more, and not a moment too soon."
