= Captain Peralta =

- Brooklyn Nine-Nine episode
- Episode no.: Season 2 Episode 18
- Directed by: Eric Appel
- Written by: Dan Goor
- Cinematography by: Giovani Lampassi
- Editing by: Cortney Carrillo
- Production code: 218
- Original air date: March 8, 2015
- Running time: 22 minutes

Guest appearances
- Bradley Whitford as Roger Peralta

Episode chronology
← Previous "Boyle-Linetti Wedding"	Next → "Sabotage"
- Brooklyn Nine-Nine season 2

"Captain Peralta" is the eighteenth episode of the second season of the American television police sitcom series Brooklyn Nine-Nine. It is the 40th overall episode of the series and is written by series co-creator Dan Goor and directed by Eric Appel. It aired on Fox in the United States on March 8, 2015.

The show revolves around the fictitious 99th precinct of the New York Police Department in Brooklyn and the officers and detectives that work in the precinct. In the episode, Jake's father comes to visit him, but his visit turns out to be a call for help with clearing him of a drugs charge he received in Canada. Meanwhile, Holt gives the precinct a brain-teaser that he can't even solve.

The episode was seen by an estimated 3.11 million household viewers and gained a 1.5/4 ratings share among adults aged 18–49, according to Nielsen Media Research. The episode received very positive reviews from critics, who praised Samberg's and Whitford's performances in the episode.

== Plot ==
In the cold open, Boyle grows a goatee that he calls "Bianca", which the rest of the squad is disgusted by. Holt has Terry and Jake forcibly shave it off him.

Jake's (Andy Samberg) father, Captain Roger Peralta (Bradley Whitford), an airline pilot, comes to visit him and he's ecstatic to spend time with him. During dinner, Roger reveals that he's facing a drugs charge in Canada due to pills appearing in his baggage and that's why he's visiting Jake.

Jake decides to help his dad and flies to Drummondville Airport with Boyle (Joe Lo Truglio) and Scully (Joel McKinnon Miller), who's fluent in French. At arrival, Roger is taken into custody by the police after pills are found in his apartment. After investigating one of his exes, Jake finds that one of them framed Roger after she discovered Roger's affair with another woman. Roger is freed, but is unable to attend his celebration at a bar. Jake finally confronts him for his absence throughout his life, deeming him an irresponsible father.

Meanwhile, Holt (Andre Braugher) gives Amy (Melissa Fumero), Rosa (Stephanie Beatriz), Gina (Chelsea Peretti) and Terry (Terry Crews) a brain-teaser, and anyone who solves it will earn two tickets for a Beyoncé concert. Despite their best efforts, no one manages to solve it. Gina and Rosa find out that Holt does not even know the answer, something he confesses to, as the brain-teaser was done 20 years ago by his former commanding officer whom he planned to meet. After taking Gina's advice of showing his job position, Holt gives her the tickets.

== Reception ==
=== Viewers ===
In its original American broadcast, "Captain Peralta" was seen by an estimated 3.11 million household viewers and gained a 1.5/4 ratings share among adults aged 18–49, according to Nielsen Media Research. This was a 14% decrease in viewership from the previous episode, which was watched by 3.61 million viewers with a 1.8/5 in the 18-49 demographics. This means that 1.5 percent of all households with televisions watched the episode, while 4 percent of all households watching television at that time watched it. With these ratings, Brooklyn Nine-Nine was the fourth most watched show on FOX for the night, beating Bob's Burgers, but behind The Simpsons, The Last Man on Earth and Family Guy, third on its timeslot and fifth for the night, behind The Simpsons, The Last Man on Earth, Family Guy, and Once Upon a Time.

=== Critical reviews ===
"Captain Peralta" received very positive reviews from critics. LaToya Ferguson of The A.V. Club gave the episode an "A" grade and wrote, "'Captain Peralta' really is a funny episode, and a large part of that straight up humor —with less gravitas, at least — is the B-plot: Captain Holt's impossible brain teaser." Allie Pape from Vulture gave the show a perfect 5 star rating out of 5 and wrote, "We've known for a long time that Jake Peralta comes preloaded with a whole host of daddy issues, which is why it's interesting that the show has waited this long to bring on his actual dad."

Alan Sepinwall of HitFix wrote, "Even stripped down to two stories instead of the show's usual three, 'Captain Peralta' bit off more than it could reasonably chew in terms of its title plot. Jake's abandonment by his father Roger is one of the defining events of his life, so the idea of Roger trying to patch things up is a big deal – even though it turned out, as Charles assumed, that he was just going to let Jake down yet again." Andy Crump of Paste gave the episode a 9.0 rating and wrote, "Whether it's Gina's #nerdfail campaign against Amy, Terry flexing his brain, or Jake failing to understand father/son relationships, 'Captain Peralta' is a highlight in the show's sophomore go-round."
