= The Wednesday Incident =

- Brooklyn Nine-Nine episode
- Episode no.: Season 2 Episode 16
- Directed by: Claire Scanlon
- Written by: Laura McCreary
- Cinematography by: Giovani Lampassi
- Editing by: Sandra Montiel
- Production code: 216
- Original air date: February 15, 2015
- Running time: 22 minutes

Guest appearances
- Garry Marshall as Marvin Miller; Marc Evan Jackson as Kevin Cozner; James Morrison as Dan Yaeger

Episode chronology
← Previous "Windbreaker City"	Next → "Boyle-Linetti Wedding"
- Brooklyn Nine-Nine season 2

"The Wednesday Incident" is the sixteenth episode of the second season of the American television police sitcom series Brooklyn Nine-Nine. It is the 38th overall episode of the series and is written by Laura McCreary and directed by Claire Scanlon. It aired on Fox in the United States on February 15, 2015. The episode features guest appearances by Garry Marshall, Marc Evan Jackson, and James Morrison, with a cameo appearance from Katie Dippold.

The show revolves around the fictitious 99th precinct of the New York Police Department in Brooklyn and the officers and detectives that work in the precinct. In the episode, Holt arrives at the precinct in a bad mood and Jake sets out to prove he wasn't the cause of Holt's mood. Meanwhile, Boyle arrests an old man suspected of robbing a bank, but Amy and Rosa fail to see his real nature.

The episode was seen by an estimated 2.08 million household viewers and gained a 0.9/2 ratings share among adults aged 18–49, according to Nielsen Media Research. The episode received positive reviews from critics, who praised the writing, Garry Marshall's performance, as well as Holt's and Kevin's scenes in the episode.

== Plot ==
While Jake (Andy Samberg) prepares to lead an operation, the organized crime unit is handed the case by Captain Holt (Andre Braugher), who is in a bad mood and cancels overtime hours. The precinct blames Jake for Holt's bad mood, as Jake's bad handling of a champagne's cork ended up turning on the sprinkler system and ruined Holt's office (referred to as "The Wednesday Incident").

Jake sets out to prove it wasn't his fault and that Holt was already in a bad mood before he got to his office. He teams up with Gina (Chelsea Peretti) and Kevin (Marc Evan Jackson) to find out what caused Holt's mood. Soon, they find out that Holt skipped his fencing classes, which disappoints Kevin, as Holt has been lying to him. Jake discovers through security cameras that Holt was assaulted by three thugs and was stabbed, which caused his bad mood. However, this ends up causing friction in Holt's and Kevin's marriage. After Jake finds the address of the last thug, Holt tells him that he was in a bad mood due to embarrassment at his own recklessness, but asserts that Jake isn't the problem. Holt and Kevin solve their problem.

Meanwhile, Boyle (Joe Lo Truglio) brings in an old man named Marvin Miller (Garry Marshall), claiming he stole a huge chunk of money from a bank. This upsets Rosa (Stephanie Beatriz) and Amy (Melissa Fumero), as they doubt a man of his age would do such a thing. While Rosa and Amy aren't around, Marvin calmly tells Boyle about all the crimes he committed and confesses to the robbery. When Boyle tries to make him confess, Marvin dies. Later, Rosa and Amy apologize to Boyle for not believing him, as they found evidence that proved Marvin committed the crimes.

== Reception ==
=== Viewers ===
In its original American broadcast, "The Wednesday Incident" was seen by an estimated 2.08 million household viewers and gained a 0.9/2 ratings share among adults aged 18–49, according to Nielsen Media Research. This was a 20% decrease in viewership from the previous episode, which was watched by 2.59 million viewers with a 1.2/3 in the 18-49 demographics. This means that 0.9 percent of all households with televisions watched the episode, while 2 percent of all households watching television at that time watched it. With these ratings, Brooklyn Nine-Nine was the third most watched show on FOX for the night, beating Bob's Burgers, but behind The Simpsons and Family Guy, fifth on its timeslot and ninth for the night, behind Undercover Boss, The Simpsons, CSI: Crime Scene Investigation, Family Guy, 60 Minutes, America's Funniest Home Videos, The Bachelor and the Saturday Night Live 40th Anniversary Special.

=== Critical reviews ===
"The Wednesday Incident" received positive reviews from critics. LaToya Ferguson of The A.V. Club gave the episode a "B+" grade and wrote, "'The Wednesday Incident' (apparently referring to Jake setting off the sprinklers in Holt's office) is an episode that goes by so quickly that, at first, it's easy to miss that there's really not a lot going on. There's barely even in C-plot in Terry's need to keep the precinct in order given Holt's mood, and the B-plot is mostly a few solid jokes that go by just as fast as the episode. It's very much a more easy breezy episode compared to what Brooklyn Nine-Nine usually does; for all of Brooklyn Nine-Nine's wackiness, it's typically a tightly plotted and structured comedy." Allie Pape from Vulture gave the show a 3 star rating out of 5 and wrote, "I'd hate to be among those responsible for coming up with 22 episodes' worth of plot every season, but by any reasonable standard, 'The Wednesday Incident' is an air ball, doing pretty much nothing to move any of Brooklyn Nine-Nine's recurring plotlines forward and not delivering many laughs with its one-off, hit-the-reset-button premise."

Alan Sepinwall of HitFix wrote, "After a couple of slightly off episodes, it was nice to get an episode so strong that Terry pop-locking against a spray-painted robot street performer was just a minor treat."
