= Boyle–Linetti Wedding =

- Brooklyn Nine-Nine episode
- Episode no.: Season 2 Episode 17
- Directed by: Dean Holland
- Written by: Matt O'Brien
- Cinematography by: Giovani Lampassi
- Editing by: Sandra Montiel
- Production code: 217
- Original air date: March 1, 2015
- Running time: 22 minutes

Guest appearances
- Sandra Bernhard as Darlene Linetti; Stephen Root as Lynn Boyle; Nick Cannon as Marcus; Marc Evan Jackson as Kevin Cozner

Episode chronology
← Previous "The Wednesday Incident"	Next → "Captain Peralta"
- Brooklyn Nine-Nine season 2

"Boyle–Linetti Wedding" is the seventeenth episode of the second season of the American television police sitcom series Brooklyn Nine-Nine. It is the 39th overall episode of the series and is written by Matt O'Brien and directed by Dean Holland. It aired on Fox in the United States on March 1, 2015.

The show revolves around the fictitious 99th precinct of the New York Police Department in Brooklyn and the officers and detectives that work in the precinct. In the episode, Lynn Boyle's and Darlene Linetti's wedding arrives but the precinct is filled with many problems, such as Jake losing the wedding ring, Holt struggling to come up with a speech as minister and Boyle having to control his father when he gets nervous.

The episode was seen by an estimated 3.61 million household viewers and gained a 1.8/5 ratings share among adults aged 18–49, according to Nielsen Media Research. The episode received positive reviews from critics, who praised the cast performance as well as the writing.

== Plot ==
The wedding of Lynn Boyle (Stephen Root) and Darlene Linetti (Sandra Bernhard) is approaching and Gina (Chelsea Peretti) and Boyle (Joe Lo Truglio) are making their best effort to make a perfect wedding. As the minister has left, Gina asks Terry (Terry Crews) to become the minister. After Terry's failed attempts (due to him constantly breaking down while reading it), Gina has Holt (Andre Braugher) act as the minister.

Jake (Andy Samberg) is assigned to get the wedding ring and also plans to meet with a former classmate who dumped him. However, he agrees to help Amy (Melissa Fumero) catch a perp before the wedding. They catch the perp and arrive at the wedding. However, Jake discovers he lost the ring while fighting the perp and they go back to retrieve it. They find it but it gets stuck on Jake's finger. They return to the wedding where Terry pulls the ring off his finger. However, he also finds that the classmate dumped him again for another man.

While helping with the wedding, Gina finds that Lynn is suffering a nervous breakdown. As Boyle fails to make him reason, Gina manages to convince him about his bright future with Darlene. The wedding goes as planned and Holt delivers a great speech at the wedding, remarking that he delivered something he wanted for his and Kevin's (Marc Evan Jackson) wedding. After the wedding, Holt and Kevin discuss holding a proper wedding.

== Reception ==
=== Viewers ===
In its original American broadcast, "Boyle–Linetti Wedding" was seen by an estimated 3.61 million household viewers and gained a 1.8/5 ratings share among adults aged 18–49, according to Nielsen Media Research. This was a 73% increase in viewership from the previous episode, which was watched by 2.08 million viewers with a 0.9/2 in the 18-49 demographics. This means that 1.8 percent of all households with televisions watched the episode, while 5 percent of all households watching television at that time watched it. With these ratings, Brooklyn Nine-Nine was the third most watched show on FOX for the night, beating Bob's Burgers, but behind The Simpsons and The Last Man on Earth, third on its timeslot and fourth for the night, behind The Simpsons, Once Upon a Time, and The Last Man on Earth.

=== Critical reviews ===
"Boyle–Linetti Wedding" received positive reviews from critics. LaToya Ferguson of The A.V. Club gave the episode a "B+" grade and wrote, "As I mentioned before, this episode would benefit from being longer for those weaker storylines, but the parts of the episode that work, they really, really work." Allie Pape from Vulture gave the show a perfect 5 star rating out of 5 and wrote, "'Boyle–Linetti Wedding' is a jumping-off point for the show to explore how each member of the squad does love, and for longtime fans invested in these characters, the results are often surprisingly moving."

Alan Sepinwall of HitFix wrote, "Beyond that, lots to like here on the comedy front: the way Andy Samberg pronounced 'Fung,' Holt the robot struggling to say something emotional, Peralta's ecstasy over learning Amy once played french horn in high school jazz band, Rosa inadvertently making Boyle's dad panic about the wedding (and Boyle's own panic and misunderstanding of wedding traditions), and even Gina's mom listing the best days of her life." Andy Crump of Paste gave the episode a 7.4 rating and wrote, "That the main event of 'Boyle–Linetti Wedding' is so good to make up for its shortcomings says a lot about the quality of Brooklyn Nine-Nine's writing, though as usual the show works even at its weakest. At the same time, we know how good it can be at the height of its excellence. Seeing it dip from that peak even a little is inevitably going to feel a tad disappointing."
