= The Defense Rests (Brooklyn Nine-Nine) =

- Brooklyn Nine-Nine episode
- Episode no.: Season 2 Episode 14
- Directed by: Jamie Babbit
- Written by: Prentice Penny & Matt O'Brien
- Cinematography by: Giovani Lampassi
- Editing by: Cortney Carrillo
- Production code: 214
- Original air date: January 25, 2015
- Running time: 22 minutes

Guest appearances
- Kyra Sedgwick as Madeline Wuntch; Eva Longoria as Sophia Perez; Stephen Root as Lynn Boyle; Chris Parnell as Geoffrey Hoytsman

Episode chronology
← Previous "Payback"	Next → "Windbreaker City"
- Brooklyn Nine-Nine season 2

"The Defense Rests" is the fourteenth episode of the second season of the American television police sitcom series Brooklyn Nine-Nine. It is the 36th overall episode of the series and is written by Prentice Penny & Matt O'Brien and directed by Jamie Babbit. It aired on Fox in the United States on January 25, 2015.

The show revolves around the fictitious 99th precinct of the New York Police Department in Brooklyn and the officers and detectives that work in the precinct. In the episode, Jake's relationship with Sophia becomes distant when she asks for them to take a pause. Finding out that her boss is the reason, Jake decides to smooth the situation by bonding with him. Jake discovers Sophia's boss taking cocaine in a bathroom and arrests him. Meanwhile, Holt deals with a dilemma related to giving Wuntch a recommendation letter so she can leave the city, while Boyle tries to get Gina's blessing for his father's wedding.

The episode was seen by an estimated 2.79 million household viewers and gained a 1.2/3 ratings share among adults aged 18–49, according to Nielsen Media Research. The episode received positive reviews from critics, who praised Andy Samberg's performance and Holt's storyline.

== Plot ==
In the cold open, the squad tries to figure out how to solve the ant infestation in the precinct. Holt recommends opening the windows to freeze them out, but it only leads to the ants infiltrating their winter coats.

Jake (Andy Samberg) notes that Sophia (Eva Longoria) has remained distant recently. She explains that her co-workers do not like cops, especially her boss. She asks for a "pause" in their relationship. Jake decides to talk to her boss, Geoffrey (Chris Parnell), to smooth the situation.

Jake brings Terry (Terry Crews) as help to a charity event where Sophia's co-workers and Geoffrey are in attendance. Despite initially getting a lukewarm response, Jake and Geoffrey bond over betting on competitive acts. However, when Jake goes to the restroom, he finds Geoffrey snorting cocaine and arrests him. An upset Sophia arrives at the precinct, planning to defend Geoffrey. After a heated argument, Sophia breaks up with Jake, citing that their occupations don't work together.

Meanwhile, Holt (Andre Braugher) finds out that Wuntch (Kyra Sedgwick) is planning to leave New York to join the police force in Boston. Wuntch asks Holt for a recommendation letter. Holt consults with Rosa (Stephanie Beatriz) in order to decide what to do. Rosa tells Holt that even if he wants revenge, he should be nice. He ends up writing the letter, but discovers that Wuntch planned to stay on the New York force and used the other position as leverage. Wuntch kisses Holt on the lips, stunning him. Boyle (Joe Lo Truglio) is constantly bullied by Gina (Chelsea Peretti), as she does not want to give his father (Stephen Root) her blessing to marry her mother. After a talk with Boyle's father, she gives him her blessing, but threatens Boyle's life.

== Reception ==
=== Viewers ===
In its original American broadcast, "The Defense Rests" was seen by an estimated 2.79 million household viewers and gained a 1.2/3 ratings share among adults aged 18–49, according to Nielsen Media Research. This was a 16% decrease in viewership from the previous episode, which was watched by 3.29 million viewers with a 1.5/4 in the 18-49 demographics. This means that 1.2 percent of all households with televisions watched the episode, while 3 percent of all households watching television at that time watched it. With these ratings, Brooklyn Nine-Nine was the third most watched show on FOX for the night, beating Bob's Burgers, but behind Family Guy and The Simpsons, fourth on its timeslot and seventh for the night, behind CSI: Crime Scene Investigation, Undercover Boss, Family Guy, The Simpsons, America's Funniest Home Videos, and Miss Universe 2014.

=== Critical reviews ===
"The Defense Rests" received positive reviews from critics. LaToya Ferguson of The A.V. Club gave the episode a "B+" grade and wrote, "'The Defense Rests' is an endlessly amusing episode, as well as slightly heartbreaking, but it's also a bit… strange. The episode runs a spectrum of tones and emotions, but luckily, it's able to balance them so it's not a jarring shift along the way." Allie Pape from Vulture gave the show a 4 star rating out of 5 and wrote, "The show doesn't often do more serious beats, but it's surprisingly good at getting them right when it does, and both Jake and Sophia's breakup scene and the final bit with Holt, Peralta, and Terry drinking in the bar are surprisingly poignant."

Alan Sepinwall of HitFix wrote, "Not one of their strongest episodes this season, but still plenty of laughs." Andy Crump of Paste gave the episode a 7.9 and wrote, "Amazingly, 'Defense Rests' never feels overstuffed or bloated by sheer weight of material; each segment is also rife with great one-liners and visual gags, and best of all, we finally learn how tall Terry is in egg rolls. (Twenty five.) Asses are sexier than snakes, no one can savor a moment like Holt, Terry just can't read the vibe, defense attorneys are savage jerks (even when they're being nice), and the best revenge is sabotaging your enemy's auto-correct. (Wuntch to 'butt.' Sophia to 'butt.' The hilarity is endless.) And best of all, three oft-revisited narratives get pushed ahead to new places, moving Brooklyn Nine-Nine as a show ahead with them."
