= AC/DC (Brooklyn Nine-Nine) =

- Brooklyn Nine-Nine episode
- Episode no.: Season 2 Episode 20
- Directed by: Linda Mendoza
- Written by: Kylie Condon
- Cinematography by: Giovani Lampassi
- Editing by: Cortney Carrillo
- Production code: 222
- Original air date: April 26, 2015
- Running time: 22 minutes

Guest appearances
- Marc Evan Jackson as Kevin Cozner; Nick Cannon as Marcus

Episode chronology
← Previous "Sabotage"	Next → "Det. Dave Majors"
- Brooklyn Nine-Nine season 2

"AC/DC" is the twentieth episode of the second season of the American television police sitcom series Brooklyn Nine-Nine. It is the 42nd overall episode of the series and is written by Kylie Condon and directed by Linda Mendoza. It aired on Fox in the United States on April 26, 2015.

The show revolves around the fictitious 99th precinct of the New York Police Department in Brooklyn and the officers and detectives that work in the precinct. In the episode, Jake gets hurt while pursuing a suspect and is told to rest while healing. He decides to go with Boyle to Atlantic City for vacation, but it turns out he's following the suspect. Meanwhile, Holt and Kevin hold a dinner in their house to meet Rosa and Marcus, although the meeting soon becomes problematic.

The episode was seen by an estimated 2.78 million household viewers and gained a 1.5/4 ratings share among adults aged 18–49, according to Nielsen Media Research. The episode received generally positive reviews from critics, who praised Andy Samberg's performance.

== Plot ==
Jake (Andy Samberg) and Boyle (Joe Lo Truglio) pursue a perp as he runs above the cars on a crowded city street. Jake runs as well, but ends up falling in a car's sunroof, injuring himself. Back in the precinct, Jake is told by Terry (Terry Crews) to go home and rest while he is healing.

After a few days, Jake and Boyle depart for Atlantic City to take vacations at a four-star hotel, calling the trip: Atlantic City/Dudes Club. However, once they arrive, Charles sees they are at a seedy motel instead, and Jake reveals to Boyle they're following the perp, much to Boyle's disappointment. Jake then renames the trip Atlantic City/Detectives Club. A few hours later, Terry shows up in the hotel, as Boyle informed him. Then, they find the perp and go after him. However, Jake is hit by an incoming Atlantic City police cruiser (previously called by Terry), injuring himself severely. At the hospital, Jake explains to Terry that the reason why he can't leave the case open is because he blames himself for when he stopped working on a case while he went on vacation with some friends, resulting in two civilians being shot in a fight involving his suspect. After some advice, Jake decides to rest and departs to Atlantic City for a real trip with Boyle to make up for their promise.

Holt (Andre Braugher) tells Rosa (Stephanie Beatriz) that Kevin (Marc Evan Jackson) wants to set up dinner to meet her and Marcus (Nick Cannon). Fearing the dinner may go awry, Holt invites Amy (Melissa Fumero) and Gina (Chelsea Peretti) to the dinner as well. However, Amy and Gina's subway train is delayed and they fail to get to the dinner, and the two decide to get drunk instead. At the dinner, Rosa leaves abruptly, telling Holt she fears she may be pregnant and the dinner ends. The next day, Rosa reveals to Holt she isn't pregnant and thanks him for the dinner.

== Reception ==
=== Viewers ===
In its original American broadcast, "AC/DC" was seen by an estimated 2.78 million household viewers and gained a 1.5/4 ratings share among adults aged 18–49, according to Nielsen Media Research. This was a slight decrease in viewership from the previous episode, which was watched by 2.96 million viewers with a 1.4/4 in the 18-49 demographics. This means that 1.5 percent of all households with televisions watched the episode, while 4 percent of all households watching television at that time watched it. With these ratings, Brooklyn Nine-Nine was the third most watched show on FOX for the night, beating Bob's Burgers and The Last Man on Earth, but behind The Simpsons and Family Guy, third on its timeslot and sixth for the night, behind The Simpsons, America's Funniest Home Videos, Family Guy, Secrets and Lies, and Once Upon a Time.

=== Critical reviews ===
"AC/DC" received generally positive reviews from critics. Kayla Kumari Upadhyaya of The A.V. Club gave the episode a "B" grade and wrote, "While 'AC/DC' isn't the best of said season, it's still a very useful episode to re-enter the world after a month and a half-long absence." Allie Pape from Vulture gave the show a 4 star rating out of 5 and wrote, "That was one hell of a plot carrot for B99 to dangle and then immediately snatch away, all the more so because we're getting to the end of the show's second season, and aside from Terry having a third baby and Boyle and Gina's parents getting hitched, literally nothing has changed for any of the show's core cast."

Alan Sepinwall of HitFix wrote, "Having said that, this was another very funny episode, and with a nice balance of styles." Andy Crump of Paste gave the episode a 9.3 rating and wrote, "In context with its sitcom trappings, 'AC/DC' satisfies in grand fashion. We can't ask for more than that."
