= Johnny and Dora =

- Brooklyn Nine-Nine episode
- Episode no.: Season 2 Episode 23
- Directed by: Dean Holland
- Written by: Luke Del Tredici
- Cinematography by: Giovani Lampassi
- Editing by: Cortney Carrillo; Sandra Montiel
- Production code: 223
- Original air date: May 17, 2015
- Running time: 22 minutes

Guest appearances
- Kyra Sedgwick as Madeline Wuntch; Nick Cannon as Marcus; Billy Merritt as Wayne Tercelle; Ray Abruzzo as Michael Augustine

Episode chronology
← Previous "The Chopper"	Next → "New Captain"
- Brooklyn Nine-Nine season 2

"Johnny and Dora" is the twenty-third episode and season finale of the second season of the American television police sitcom series Brooklyn Nine-Nine. It is the 45th overall episode of the series and is written by Luke Del Tredici and directed by Dean Holland. It aired on Fox in the United States on May 17, 2015.

The show revolves around the fictitious 99th precinct of the New York Police Department in Brooklyn and the officers and detectives that work in the precinct. In the episode, Jake and Amy have to go undercover to catch an identity thief, an assignment that brings them uncomfortably closer. Meanwhile, Holt tasks Terry and Gina with retrieving a letter that could help him win against Wuntch and prevent him from getting the promotion.

The episode was seen by an estimated 2.35 million household viewers and gained a 1.1/4 ratings share among adults aged 18–49, according to Nielsen Media Research. The episode received critical acclaim from critics, who praised Samberg's, Fumero's and Braugher's performances in the episode.

== Plot ==
In the cold open, the squad pays their respects to the old vending machine that's getting replaced, but rush to get free candy when the janitor accidentally drops and breaks it.

Jake (Andy Samberg) and Amy (Melissa Fumero) are pursuing an identity thief with the help of Boyle (Joe Lo Truglio) and Rosa (Stephanie Beatriz). During the mission, Jake explains to Amy that he had earlier planned to ask her out for a date which is why he was reluctant to work the case with her.

Jake and Amy go undercover at a restaurant posing as an engaged couple and find the identity thief, who is about to handle a package. Throughout the operation, they kiss in order to pose as a couple. After catching the thief and his buyer, they discuss what happened during the operation and whether they have feelings for each other. Meanwhile, Boyle tries to organize a birthday surprise for Rosa, but she despises her birthday. Rosa finds out that Marcus (Nick Cannon) has booked a bar for a date only for themselves. Marcus reveals that this is all thanks to Boyle.

Meanwhile, Holt (Andre Braugher) tells Terry (Terry Crews) and Gina (Chelsea Peretti) about his situation with Wuntch (Kyra Sedgwick), and asks if they could retrieve a letter that Wuntch previously wrote to use against her. Terry and Gina manage to retrieve it and hand it to Holt, who shows it to Wuntch, claiming that he has evidence of what she did and he tells her to reconsider her plans. However, she informs him that if he reports her, she will make sure everyone in the precinct is moved to different places. Holt decides to accept the offer and has an emotional goodbye with the precinct, only to be joined by Gina as well. Jake and Amy share a real kiss in the filing room until they're told that the new captain has arrived.

== Reception ==
=== Viewers ===
In its original American broadcast, "Johnny and Dora" was seen by an estimated 2.35 million household viewers and gained a 1.1/4 ratings share among adults aged 18–49, according to Nielsen Media Research. This was a slight decrease in viewership from the previous episode, which was watched by 2.56 million viewers with a 1.3/4 in the 18-49 demographics. This means that 1.1 percent of all households with televisions watched the episode, while 4 percent of all households watching television at that time watched it. With these ratings, Brooklyn Nine-Nine was the third most watched show on FOX for the night, beating Bob's Burgers but behind Family Guy, and The Simpsons, third on its timeslot and fifth for the night, behind The Simpsons, Family Guy, America's Funniest Home Videos, and the 2015 Billboard Music Awards.

=== Critical reviews ===
"Johnny and Dora" received critical acclaim from critics. LaToya Ferguson of The A.V. Club gave the episode an "A−" grade and wrote, "In fact, 'Johnny And Dora' is one of the more in-tone, self-assured episodes of season two. It's the right note to leave the show on, especially with this season's up and downs." Allie Pape from Vulture gave the show a 4 star rating out of 5 and wrote, "I'm proud of the show for painting itself into this challenging corner, especially because the real-life NYPD certainly has no end of major issues when it comes to PR; while I doubt we're going to see a Fox sitcom take on police brutality, the move could allow B99 to mine some of the many topical issues surrounding modern police departments."
