= Lockdown (Brooklyn Nine-Nine) =

- Brooklyn Nine-Nine episode
- Episode no.: Season 2 Episode 7
- Directed by: Linda Mendoza
- Written by: Luke Del Tredici
- Cinematography by: Giovani Lampassi
- Editing by: Cortney Carrillo
- Production code: 208
- Original air date: November 16, 2014
- Running time: 22 minutes

Guest appearance
- Morgan Walsh as Tanya

Episode chronology
← Previous "Jake and Sophia"	Next → "USPIS"
- Brooklyn Nine-Nine season 2

"Lockdown" is the seventh episode of the second season of the American television police sitcom series Brooklyn Nine-Nine. It is the 29th overall episode of the series and is written by co-executive producer Luke Del Tredici and directed by Linda Mendoza. It aired on Fox in the United States on November 16, 2014. It's the eight episode of the season to be produced but it's the seventh to be broadcast.

The show revolves around the fictitious 99th precinct of the New York Police Department in Brooklyn and the officers and detectives that work in the precinct. Jake Peralta (Andy Samberg) is an immature yet very talented detective in the precinct with an astounding record of crimes solved, putting him in a competition with fellow detective Amy Santiago (Melissa Fumero). The precinct's status changes when the Captain is retiring and a new commanding officer, Cpt. Raymond Holt (Andre Braugher) is appointed as the newest Captain. This creates a conflict between Jake and Holt over their respective methods in the field. In the episode, Jake is appointed Captain of the precinct when Holt and Terry leave for a charity event on Thanksgiving. However, the precinct goes on a lockdown when a mysterious powder spreads through it, which results in the HAZMAT unit working to determine if the powder is toxic.

The episode was seen by an estimated 4.53 million household viewers and gained a 2.2/5 ratings share among adults aged 18–49, according to Nielsen Media Research. The episode received mixed-to-positive reviews from critics, who praised Samberg's performance in the episode but criticized the episode's focus on Jake while leaving most of the supporting cast sidelined.

== Plot ==
In the cold open, Jake tries to one-up Amy at expressing condolences to Holt for his uncle passing, but sends an email from his personal email, which has "My Stinky Butt" as his signature.

Holt (Andre Braugher) and Terry (Terry Crews) leave for a charity event at Brighton Beach and put Jake (Andy Samberg) in charge of the precinct. Just when everyone is about to leave for Thanksgiving, Boyle (Joe Lo Truglio) accidentally gets a package that contains a rare powder, forcing the precinct to go lockdown as other packages were sent to other precincts in the recent days.

The incident forces Holt and Terry to skip the event and stop at Terry's house to monitor the situation. However, Terry's brother-in-law, Zeke (Jamal Duff), is in the house and is constantly bullying him. Zeke then begins to make amends with Terry when he believes that Terry has a terrible boss just like him. When Terry and Holt leave for the precinct, Terry asks Holt to act as a bad boss in front of him.

With the building placed under quarantine by the HAZMAT unit, Jake tries to calm everyone in an attempt to smooth the situation. However, when a man who is a lawyer discovers that the powder may be toxic, he reveals it to everyone, causing a mutiny. Using advice from Amy (Melissa Fumero), Jake makes his position known to everyone, threatening to arrest everyone who challenges his authority. Just then, the HAZMAT unit returns and proclaims that the powder isn't toxic. Shortly thereafter, Holt and Terry return to hear the good news.

== Reception ==
=== Viewers ===
In its original American broadcast, "Lockdown" was seen by an estimated 4.53 million household viewers and gained a 2.2/5 ratings share among adults aged 18–49, according to Nielsen Media Research. This was a 13% increase in viewership from the previous episode, which was watched by 3.99 million viewers with a 1.9/5 in the 18-49 demographics. This means that 2.2 percent of all households with televisions watched the episode, while 5 percent of all households watching television at that time watched it. With these ratings, Brooklyn Nine-Nine was the second most watched show on FOX for the night, beating Bob's Burgers and Family Guy but behind The Simpsons, fifth on its timeslot and fifth for the night, behind Once Upon a Time, The Simpsons, The OT, and NBC Sunday Night Football.

=== Critical reviews ===
"Lockdown" received mixed-to-positive reviews from critics. LaToya Ferguson of The A.V. Club gave the episode a "C" grade and wrote, "To those viewers who have been finding season two of Brooklyn Nine-Nine to be weaker than season one, 'Lockdown' might actually be the perfect example of that dip. Throughout the entire episode, there's just constant shallow characterization — which is extremely uncharacteristic at this point in the series —that takes Brooklyn Nine-Nine to a dark place, quality-wise. That's because it takes it to The Jake Peralta Show. Jake Peralta is a good character, and I've sung his praises in most (if not all) of these reviews, but when the show makes him the sole focus and only relies him, with everyone else as nothing more than his sounding boards, the downshift in quality is palpable."

Jackson McHenry of Entertainment Weekly wrote, "While 'Lockdown' all but forgets that history — Jake says he hates the holiday because 'the pilgrims were murderers and turkeys taste like napkins' — it does dig into Jake's surprisingly deep neurosis, and specifically his irrepressible desire to please everyone. In doing so, 'Lockdown' manages to put another spin on Andy Samberg's typically broad performance, making his eternally upbeat attitude seem manic and even desperate. It's not a perfect episode by any means, but it opens up a lot of possibilities for the character." Allie Pape from Vulture gave the show a 3 star rating out of 5 and wrote, "'Lockdown' lacked the absurdist zip of some of the other stuck-in-the-precinct episodes, like 'The Jimmy Jab Games' or the first Halloween episode. (The closest we got: Boyle doing the 'Single Ladies' dance, with two perps backing him up from behind the doors of the holding cell.) It still boasted plenty of good laugh lines, but I would have loved to see more advantage taken of the wild cast of characters stuck in there, who were more or less reduced to an angry mob despite getting some really awesome team nicknames."

Alan Sepinwall of HitFix wrote, "'Lockdown' felt like a throwback to those frustrating episodes from early in the first season where Jake would spend 80 percent of the episode ignoring obviously wise advice from Captain Holt, getting deeper and deeper into trouble until he finally listened. It's a pattern I'd hoped both Jake and the show had moved beyond, but here we got a variation on it, with Amy playing the role of Holt – even though, technically, the whole story was about Jake having to fill in for the captain on Thanksgiving. That Jake wants to be everybody's buddy, rather than the stern authority figure he's temporarily replacing, fits his character, but the whole A-story dragged as we waited for Jake to stop being such an idiot. With that many characters stuck in one location, there were some amusing moments in the margins (my favorite was Boyle doing the 'Single Ladies' dance with the hookers), but on a whole, this one didn't work." Andy Crump of Paste gave the episode a 6.8 and wrote, "'Lockdown' has a strong set-up and great jokes at its fingertips, but it doesn't have much direction, either. That leads to a whole lot of nothing, instead of growth among the show’s primary and secondary cast members; if anybody really learns anything here, it's Jake, put in charge over Amy for reasons that the script treats as perfunctory."
