= Jake and Sophia =

- Brooklyn Nine-Nine episode
- Episode no.: Season 2 Episode 6
- Directed by: Michael McDonald
- Written by: Tricia McAlpin & David Phillips
- Cinematography by: Giovani Lampassi
- Editing by: Cortney Carrillo
- Production code: 206
- Original air date: November 9, 2014
- Running time: 22 minutes

Guest appearances
- Eva Longoria as Sophia Perez; Stephen Root as Lynn Boyle; Sandra Bernhard as Darlene Linetti

Episode chronology
← Previous "The Mole"	Next → "Lockdown"
- Brooklyn Nine-Nine season 2

"Jake and Sophia" is the sixth episode of the second season of the American television police sitcom series Brooklyn Nine-Nine. It is the 28th overall episode of the series and is written by Tricia McAlpin & David Phillips and directed by Michael McDonald. It aired on Fox in the United States on November 9, 2014.

The show revolves around the fictitious 99th precinct of the New York Police Department in Brooklyn and the officers and detectives that work in the precinct. Jake Peralta (Andy Samberg) is an immature yet very talented detective in the precinct with an astounding record of crimes solved, putting him in a competition with fellow detective Amy Santiago (Melissa Fumero). The precinct's status changes when the Captain is retiring and a new commanding officer, Cpt. Raymond Holt (Andre Braugher) is appointed as the newest Captain. This creates a conflict between Jake and Holt over their respective methods in the field. In the episode, Jake has a romantic encounter with a woman named Sophia but he then finds out that she's an attorney representing a criminal Jake arrested. Meanwhile, Amy runs for union rep as Scully is not a good representative for the union while Boyle and Gina fight for a reservation date they organized before they broke up.

The episode was seen by an estimated 3.99 million household viewers and gained a 1.9/5 ratings share among adults aged 18–49, according to Nielsen Media Research. The episode received mostly positive reviews from critics, who praised Eva Longoria's performance in the episode as well as Boyle's and Gina's subplot.

== Plot ==
In the cold open, Jake and the squad speculate why Amy is late for work for the first time. Holt ends up correctly predicting that she was held up at the bank.

Jake (Andy Samberg), eager to get into the dating scene, clicks with Sophia (Eva Longoria), who turns out to be the defense lawyer for a criminal Jake caught. Jake tries to have Sophia thrown off the case, but the judge refuses. The two struggle to put aside their night out to behave professionally in court. To Jake's dismay, the criminal is declared not guilty. Despite this, Sofia and Jake decide to give their relationship a shot as long as they do not interfere or talk about their work lives.

Rosa (Stephanie Beatriz) urges Amy (Melissa Fumero) to run for union rep to replace an incompetent Scully (Joel McKinnon Miller). Amy refuses because she doesn't want to stand up to management, afraid that it will affect her chances of becoming Captain one day. Despite initially refusing to intervene, Holt encourages Amy to run as he had to challenge higher authority multiple times on his path to becoming Captain. Amy decides to run and even gets Scully's approval when she agrees to bring back party subs to union meetings.

Meanwhile, Boyle (Joe Lo Truglio) and Gina (Chelsea Peretti) fight over a non-refundable hotel room reservation they made before they ended their affair, resorting to a number of dirty tactics against each other. They both get each other to work on the night of the reservation and end up giving it to their parents, resulting in Boyle's father hooking up with Gina's mother.

== Reception ==
=== Viewers ===
In its original American broadcast, "Jake and Sophia" was seen by an estimated 3.99 million household viewers and gained a 1.9/5 ratings share among adults aged 18–49, according to Nielsen Media Research. This was a 17% increase in viewership from the previous episode, which was watched by 3.41 million viewers with a 1.7/4 in the 18-49 demographics. This means that 1.9 percent of all households with televisions watched the episode, while 5 percent of all households watching television at that time watched it. With these ratings, Brooklyn Nine-Nine was the second most watched show on FOX for the night, beating Mulaney and Family Guy but behind The Simpsons, fifth on its timeslot and fifth for the night, behind Once Upon a Time, The Simpsons, The OT, and NBC Sunday Night Football.

=== Critical reviews ===
"Jake and Sophia" received mostly positive reviews from critics. LaToya Ferguson of The A.V. Club gave the episode a "B" grade and wrote, "All of this being said, 'Jake And Sophia' isn't uproariously hilarious or as quotable as the earlier episodes of this season. However, it still brings something to the table. In fact, the line readings are some of the best of the season, and that actually elevates the episode's quality. It's still a fun and funny episode of television. But in a lot of ways, the humor in 'Jake And Sophia' is subtler than that of the previous episodes."

Jackson McHenry of Entertainment Weekly wrote, "Amy Santiago is Brooklyn Nine-Nine's unsung hero. Captain Holt's been the season's obvious perfectly enunciating standout. Gina has lines, and Chelsea Peretti's line readings, that rocket her into the weird comedy stratosphere. Andy Samberg's Jake has enthusiasm and star power, while Terry and Rosa are simply powerful (self-conscious and unselfconscious varieties respectively). And Boyle’s Brooklyn‘s bumbling Tom Bombadil—harmless and charming, but somehow essential." Allie Pape from Vulture gave the show a 3 star rating out of 5 and wrote, "Eva Longoria hasn't been much of a screen presence since Desperate Housewives ascended to that omniscient voice-over palace in the sky back in 2012, and it was nice to see her pop up in tonight's Brooklyn Nine-Nine, the first of what will apparently be a three-episode arc for district attorney Sophia Perez. (In case you were wondering where Longoria's been, the short answer is producing EVERYTHING.) It's a shame the show couldn't have found a slightly less-hackneyed plotline than 'accidentally slept with the enemy' to introduce her, especially after Arrested Development's Julia Louis-Dreyfus arc pretty much rode that trope into the ground, but Longoria is an appealing presence here, even if her character isn't very fleshed-out."

Alan Sepinwall of HitFix wrote, "'Jake and Sophia' was a great example of what Schur and Goor talked about before season 1: that point a good sitcom reaches where the characters have become so specific that you can place them into any story and it’s inherently funny because they're the ones in that story." Andy Crump of Paste gave the episode an 8.0 and wrote, "Whether Brooklyn Nine-Nine will circle back around to his feelings for his coworker remains to be seen, but that's probably a 'yes' (and you can put decent odds on Sophia's career as a defense attorney remaining a sticking point for as long as Longoria sticks around). For now, 'Jake and Sophia' has shifted the pecking order in ways that hopefully prove meaningful in the long run; in other words, it's just another solid installment from one of the most remarkably progressive sitcoms on the market. (And how about the Stephen Root/Sandra Bernhard cameo at the end?! Please let their newfound fling recur again and again.)"
