= Sabotage (Brooklyn Nine-Nine) =

- Brooklyn Nine-Nine episode
- Episode no.: Season 2 Episode 19
- Directed by: Jay Karas
- Written by: Brian Reich
- Cinematography by: Giovani Lampassi
- Editing by: Sandra Montiel
- Production code: 219
- Original air date: March 15, 2015
- Running time: 22 minutes

Guest appearance
- Chris Parnell as Geoffrey Hoytsman

Episode chronology
← Previous "Captain Peralta"	Next → "AC/DC"
- Brooklyn Nine-Nine season 2

"Sabotage" is the nineteenth episode of the second season of the American television police sitcom series Brooklyn Nine-Nine. It is the 41st overall episode of the series and is written by Brian Reich and directed by Jay Karas. It aired on Fox in the United States on March 15, 2015.

The show revolves around the fictitious 99th precinct of the New York Police Department in Brooklyn and the officers and detectives that work in the precinct. In the episode, Jake is told that due to a failed drug test, he's suspended and due to the recent unfortunate things that have happened to him, he begins to suspect someone is trying to sabotage him. Holt asks Rosa and Amy for help with investigating. Meanwhile, Boyle is forced to work with Hitchcock and Scully on a case and finds that they're very good detectives. Also, Holt looks for a solution when he misses one of Gina's performances.

The episode was seen by an estimated 2.96 million household viewers and gained a 1.4/4 ratings share among adults aged 18–49, according to Nielsen Media Research. The episode received generally positive reviews from critics, who praised Parnell's guest performance.

== Plot ==
After a few days where many unfortunate things happen to him, Jake (Andy Samberg) is told by Holt (Andre Braugher) that he failed a drug test, as labs found cocaine and methamphetamine in his urine. While Holt believes Jake did not do it, he has to suspend him.

Holt then tasks Amy (Melissa Fumero) and Rosa (Stephanie Beatriz) with investigating the possible sabotage. Throughout the day, Jake keeps trying to help them, much to their dismay. Later, Jake is kidnapped by Geoffrey Hoytsman (Chris Parnell), who is revealed to be the one that orchestrated the sabotage. Hoytsman blames Jake for ruining his life. Geoffrey tries to make Jake confess to framing him and absolve him of everything at gunpoint, but is found and arrested by Rosa and Amy. Jake is subsequently cleared of all charges.

Meanwhile, Boyle (Joe Lo Truglio) is forced to work with Hitchcock (Dirk Blocker) and Scully (Joel McKinnon Miller) on a case. After Hitchcock and Scully fail to take the case seriously, Boyle calls them "the most incompetent detectives". Later, Hitchcock and Scully tell Boyle that they managed to solve the case, proving to be smarter than what everyone thinks. However, due to their unwillingness to go off-desk, they ask Boyle not to tell anyone. Holt tells Gina (Chelsea Peretti) that he missed one of her dance performances. This depresses Gina, who decides to quit dancing. Taking advice from Terry (Terry Crews) about lying, Holt gives her a chance to perform at an important event.

== Reception ==
=== Viewers ===
In its original American broadcast, "Sabotage" was seen by an estimated 2.96 million household viewers and gained a 1.4/4 ratings share among adults aged 18–49, according to Nielsen Media Research. This was a slight decrease in viewership from the previous episode, which was watched by 3.11 million viewers with a 1.5/4 in the 18-49 demographics. This means that 1.4 percent of all households with televisions watched the episode, while 4 percent of all households watching television at that time watched it. With these ratings, Brooklyn Nine-Nine was the fourth most watched show on FOX for the night, beating Bob's Burgers, but behind The Simpsons, The Last Man on Earth and Family Guy, third on its timeslot and seventh for the night, behind Secrets and Lies, The Simpsons, 60 Minutes, The Last Man on Earth, Family Guy, and Once Upon a Time.

=== Critical reviews ===
"Sabotage" received generally positive reviews from critics. Kayla Kumari Upadhyaya of The A.V. Club gave the episode a "B−" grade and wrote, "'Sabotage' doesn't necessarily work against or pedal backwards from any of that, but it certainly doesn't continue the careful character work that Brooklyn Nine-Nine has accomplished lately." Allie Pape from Vulture gave the show a 3 star rating out of 5 and wrote, "With just three episodes left in the season, I'm really scratching my head as to where this is all going. At least the Gigglepig story line offered an end-to-end form for the front half of this season, and the past two episodes' digging into family matters provided some interesting emotional beats."

Alan Sepinwall of HitFix wrote, "Of late, 'Brooklyn' has toggled back and forth between episodes with two stories and episodes with three, and the latter group often ends up feeling rushed throughout. That mostly wasn't the case with the subplots of 'Sabotage,' which each had a couple of funny ideas at their core – Holt and Terry disagree about whether to lie to Gina about missing her dance performance, and Boyle is forced to work a case with Scully and Hitchcock, who turn out to be secretly competent – and executed them well." Andy Crump of Paste gave the episode an 8.5 rating and wrote, "There are enough good wisecracks and character beats here to justify 'Sabotage,' but they don't make up for the lax writing and missed opportunities."
