= New Captain =

- Brooklyn Nine-Nine episode
- Episode no.: Season 3 Episode 1
- Directed by: Michael Schur
- Written by: Matt Murray
- Cinematography by: Giovani Lampassi
- Editing by: Sandra Montiel
- Production code: 301
- Original air date: September 27, 2015
- Running time: 22 minutes

Guest appearances
- Kyra Sedgwick as Madeline Wuntch; Bill Hader as Seth Dozerman; Dean Winters as Keith "The Vulture" Pembroke

Episode chronology
← Previous "Johnny and Dora"	Next → "The Funeral"
- Brooklyn Nine-Nine season 3

"New Captain" is the first episode and season premiere of the third season of the American television police sitcom series Brooklyn Nine-Nine. It is the 46th overall episode of the series and is written by Matt Murray and directed by Michael Schur. It aired on Fox in the United States on September 27, 2015.

The show revolves around the fictitious 99th precinct of the New York Police Department in Brooklyn and the officers and detectives that work in the precinct. In the episode, Jake and Amy decide to pursue a relationship after revealing their feelings for each other. Also, the precinct welcomes a new captain named Seth Dozerman, who makes the precinct's life impossible by giving them "Dozerpads" in order to accomplish their tasks. Meanwhile, Holt and Gina adjust to their new roles in the PR department.

The episode was seen by an estimated 3.14 million household viewers and gained a 1.5/4 ratings share among adults aged 18–49, according to Nielsen Media Research. The episode received critical acclaim from critics, who praised Hader's guest performance as well as Jake's and Amy's character development.

== Plot ==
The new captain, Seth Dozerman (Bill Hader), arrives at the precinct. Introducing himself as efficiency-obsessed and addicted to timekeeping, he constantly suffers heart attacks. He gives the precinct "Dozerpads", which they will need to accomplish something every 55 minutes.

Jake (Andy Samberg) and Amy (Melissa Fumero) discuss revealing their feelings for each other and decide to pursue a slow and mature relationship. However, after their first date, they sleep together. When they face getting discovered by Boyle (Joe Lo Truglio), Jake meets with Dozerman, acting as efficiency-obsessed as him, earning his respect. However, when Jake and Amy kiss in the filing room, Dozerman finds them and threatens consequences. However, he gets a severe heart attack, dying and exposing their relationship to everyone. Amy takes this as a sign that their relationship can't continue and they break up, but they then decide to get back together, no rules involved. However, the precinct is informed that The Vulture (Dean Winters) is their new Captain, promising that everything will get worse.

Meanwhile, Holt (Andre Braugher) and Gina (Chelsea Peretti) adjust to their new roles in the Public Relations Department. Holt is annoyed with his unproductive co-workers, who have spent weeks debating the name of the department's mascot, which is a pigeon. After he criticizes the wasted time on naming the mascot, Wuntch (Kyra Sedgwick) makes him the person who must wear the costume. Holt plans on quitting, but after advice from Gina, he decides to continue working.

== Reception ==
=== Viewers ===
In its original American broadcast, "New Captain" was seen by an estimated 3.14 million household viewers and gained a 1.5/4 ratings share among adults aged 18–49, according to Nielsen Media Research. This was a 33% increase in viewership from the previous episode, which was watched by 2.35 million viewers with a 1.1/4 in the 18-49 demographics. This means that 1.5 percent of all households with televisions watched the episode, while 4 percent of all households watching television at that time watched it. With these ratings, Brooklyn Nine-Nine was the second most watched show on FOX for the night, beating Bob's Burgers, The Last Man on Earth, and Family Guy but behind The Simpsons, fourth on its timeslot and eight for the night, behind The Simpsons, Once Upon a Time, the CSI: Crime Scene Investigation finale, Quantico, 60 Minutes, and Sunday Night Football.

=== Critical reviews ===
"New Captain" received critical acclaim from critics. LaToya Ferguson of The A.V. Club gave the episode a "B+" grade and wrote, "Now three seasons in, Brooklyn Nine-Nine has made it clear that it's very eager to embrace change. Stagnation can kill a series' quality, and Brooklyn Nine-Nine apparently sees that and has decided to make sure that no one can ever say that stagnation was ever one of the series’ problems." Allie Pape from Vulture gave the show a 4 star rating out of 5 and wrote, "I love Winters and this character and hope that he'll last at least a few episodes longer than Hader did. Treat a Timberlake like a Fatone at your peril, Brooklyn Nine-Nine."

Alan Sepinwall of HitFix wrote, "Fortunately, 'New Captain' does, indeed, have a lot of fun with this inevitably temporary change in the status quo." Andy Crump of Paste gave the episode an 8.5 rating and wrote, "The decision to favor substance over chuckles might seem stupid on paper, but it's smart in practice, and, as Terry reminds us, 'stupid' is a no-no word. Brooklyn Nine-Nine has redefined itself several times over throughout its brief lifespan. With 'New Captain,' the show has taken big steps toward doing so yet again."
