= The Road Trip (Brooklyn Nine-Nine) =

- Brooklyn Nine-Nine episode
- Episode no.: Season 2 Episode 9
- Directed by: Beth McCarthy-Miller
- Written by: Brigitte Munoz-Liebowitz
- Cinematography by: Giovani Lampassi
- Editing by: Sandra Montiel
- Production code: 209
- Original air date: November 30, 2014
- Running time: 22 minutes

Guest appearances
- Eva Longoria as Sophia Perez; Kyle Bornheimer as Teddy Wells

Episode chronology
← Previous "USPIS"	Next → "The Pontiac Bandit Returns"
- Brooklyn Nine-Nine season 2

"The Road Trip" is the ninth episode of the second season of the American television police sitcom series Brooklyn Nine-Nine. It is the 31st overall episode of the series and is written by Brigitte Munoz-Liebowitz and directed by Beth McCarthy-Miller. It aired on Fox in the United States on November 30, 2014.

In the episode, Jake and Amy are assigned to go on a work trip together. Jake seizes the opportunity to invite Sophia and Teddy as well for a romantic weekend, but soon discovers that Amy wants to break up with Teddy. Meanwhile, Boyle helps Holt learn the art of cooking for his and Kevin's anniversary, while Rosa refuses to go home when she catches a cold.

The episode was seen by an estimated 3.11 million household viewers and gained a 1.4/3 ratings share among adults aged 18–49, according to Nielsen Media Research. The episode received critical acclaim from critics, who praised Jake's and Amy's storyline and character development.

== Plot ==
In the cold open, Jake and Boyle prepare to go undercover as longshoremen to bust a cargo smuggling ring, only to find out the leader turned himself in. Holt however lets them stay in character for a few minutes.

Captain Holt (Andre Braugher) assigns Jake (Andy Samberg) and Amy (Melissa Fumero) to go on a work trip to transfer a criminal who skipped bail and fled upstate. Holt also asks Boyle (Joe Lo Truglio) for help with learning how to cook a breakfast for his and Kevin's anniversary. When he doesn't learn the lesson, Holt storms out of his classes.

Seeing they are staying at a bed and breakfast, Jake decides to invite Sophia (Eva Longoria) for a romantic weekend. As a gesture, he also invites Teddy (Kyle Bornheimer) for the weekend. However, he is scolded by Amy, as she was about to break up with Teddy. Jake and Sophia decide to help her control her emotions during dinner. However, Teddy's behavior does not change, leading Amy to break up with him. Teddy suspects that the break-up has to do with Jake and Amy's feelings for each another. This also upsets Sophia, who storms out. Jake manages to make up with Sophia, while Amy feels the break-up was the right thing to do.

Meanwhile, Terry (Terry Crews) and Gina (Chelsea Peretti) notice that Rosa (Stephanie Beatriz) has a cold and suggest she should go home, to no avail. Later, when Rosa coughs in front of a perp, Gina locks her down for the rest of the day. The following morning, Rosa wakes up better, but agrees to go home to recover. Holt apologizes to Boyle for his behavior. He reveals that he read Boyle's cooking blog and managed to make the meal he and Kevin ate on their first anniversary.

== Reception ==
=== Viewers ===
In its original American broadcast, "The Road Trip" was seen by an estimated 3.11 million household viewers and gained a 1.4/3 ratings share among adults aged 18–49, according to Nielsen Media Research. This was a slight increase in viewership from the previous episode, which was watched by 3.04 million viewers with a 1.5/4 in the 18-49 demographics. This means that 1.4 percent of all households with televisions watched the episode, while 3 percent of all households watching television at that time watched it. With these ratings, Brooklyn Nine-Nine was the most watched show on FOX for the night, beating Mulaney, and Bob's Burgers, fifth on its timeslot and eight for the night, behind CSI: Crime Scene Investigation, The Mentalist, Madam Secretary, Once Upon a Time, Football Night in America, 60 Minutes, and NBC Sunday Night Football.

=== Critical reviews ===
"The Road Trip" received critical acclaim from critics. LaToya Ferguson of The A.V. Club gave the episode an "A" grade and wrote, "'The Road Trip' really is another excellent episode for the ensemble, maintaining the strength of the series as a whole alongside the drama of the entire Jake/Amy relationship. Unlike the first few episodes of this season, Jake and Amy's past or present (or even future) feelings for each other don't come across as too much too soon ('Undercover') or tacked on for angst's sake."

Jackson McHenry of Entertainment Weekly wrote, "I can't help but think of 'Road Trip' as a nasty, beautiful little joke. The episode promises big changes and seemingly delivers on them: Amy breaks up with Teddy, Jake learns that Amy used to like him back. The romantic spark is hotter than it's been in months. Jake and Amy drive back to Brooklyn together, the opportunity for a big moment gets set up... and then Brooklyn Nine-Nine doesn't pull the trigger." Allie Pape from Vulture gave the show a perfect 5 star rating out of 5 and wrote, "Brooklyn Nine-Nine is on a roll right now, following up last week's hilarious 'USPIS' with another winner that actually has some emotional stakes behind it. The show has been far too timid about moving the ball forward on Jake and Amy's romantic story line, so isolating them in a romantic B&B was a perfect way to raise the stakes in what's got to be one of the slowest-burning will-they-or-won’t-theys in TV history."

Alan Sepinwall of HitFix wrote, "Now that was more like it. After a couple of episodes with weak Peralta stories, 'Road Trip' was a half-hour where all three plots clicked." Andy Crump of Paste gave the episode a 9.5 and wrote, "And that's what makes 'The Road Trip' so engrossing: the chance to see these characters battle against their own worst tendencies, whether it's Diaz's obstinacy, Holt's impatience, or Amy's perfectionism. Brooklyn Nine-Nine is all about the laughs for sure, but it's also about growth and development, and 'The Road Trip' brims over with all of these and more."
