= Beach House (Brooklyn Nine-Nine) =

- Brooklyn Nine-Nine episode
- Episode no.: Season 2 Episode 12
- Directed by: Tim Kirkby
- Written by: Lakshmi Sundaram & David Phillips
- Cinematography by: Giovani Lampassi
- Editing by: Cortney Carrillo
- Production code: 212
- Original air date: January 4, 2015
- Running time: 22 minutes

Guest appearances
- Nick Cannon as Marcus

Episode chronology
← Previous "Stakeout"	Next → "Payback"
- Brooklyn Nine-Nine season 2

"Beach House" is the twelfth episode of the second season of the American television police sitcom series Brooklyn Nine-Nine. It is the 34th overall episode of the series and is written by Lakshmi Sundaram & David Phillips and directed by Tim Kirkby. It aired on Fox in the United States on January 4, 2015.

In the episode, Boyle invites the precinct on a detectives-only weekend at his ex-wife's beach house while he retains it. However, upon hearing that Holt has never gone to social events during his detective days due to his sexuality, Jake invites Holt to the house. However, due to Holt's nature, the weekend turns dull. Meanwhile, Boyle helps Rosa in her relationship with Marcus, while Gina tries to find out what happens when Amy finishes a sixth drink.

The episode was seen by an estimated 6.12 million household viewers and gained a 3.0/8 ratings share among adults aged 18–49, according to Nielsen Media Research, hitting series highs in 18-49 demo. The episode received mostly positive reviews from critics, who praised Braugher's performance and the cold open in the episode, although the Gina-Amy subplot received a mixed response.

== Plot ==
In the cold open, Jake speculates that Holt is not wearing pants in his office after accidentally spilling soup on them. He makes multiple attempts to prove it, but after Holt confirms his suspicions, Jake also accidentally spills soup on his pants, leading to both of them sitting behind Holt's desk pantless.

Boyle (Joe Lo Truglio) announces that as part of his divorce, he will get a beach house for a limited time and sets a detectives-only fun weekend, which everyone accepts. While talking to Holt (Andre Braugher), Jake (Andy Samberg) finds that he wasn't invited to social events during his days as a detective due to his race and sexuality. Feeling bad for him, he decides to invite Holt to the house, much to everyone's chagrin.

However, Holt's old fashioned manners end up causing the weekend to be boring, such as refusing to gossip during dinner, walking on the beach for more than an hour during winter, turning off the bubbles in a hot tub, and listening to recorder music played by Joram Leifgrum. Jake suggests having two parties at the same time; one in the lower area of the house and another one with Holt. Jake asks members of the gang to take turns switching places between the two parties. However, Holt finds out and storms off, saddened. Jake talks to him and after some time, Holt returns to the party to play a game. In the game, players must decide if Holt said certain things or if they were made up.

During the weekend, Gina (Chelsea Peretti) tries to find out which personality Amy (Melissa Fumero) becomes after having a 6th drink. After having many drinks, Amy shows up in a sad state, which is unrelated to her energized aptitude. Meanwhile, Boyle helps Rosa figure (Stephanie Beatriz) out a texting situation between her and her boyfriend, Marcus (Nick Cannon).

== Reception ==
=== Viewers ===
In its original American broadcast, "Beach House" was seen by an estimated 6.12 million household viewers and gained a 3.0/8 ratings share among adults aged 18–49, according to Nielsen Media Research. This was a massive 73% increase in viewership from the previous episode, which was watched by 3.52 million viewers with a 1.5/4 in the 18-49 demographics. This means that 3.0 percent of all households with televisions watched the episode, while 8 percent of all households watching television at that time watched it. With these ratings, Brooklyn Nine-Nine was the second most watched show on FOX for the night, beating Bob's Burgers and Family Guy but behind The Simpsons, second on its timeslot and third for the night, behind The Simpsons, and Football Night in America.

=== Critical reviews ===
"Beach House" received mostly positive reviews from critics. LaToya Ferguson of The A.V. Club gave the episode a "B" grade and wrote, "Wrapping this up, it's important to note that there's nothing inherently wrong with a show being 'too much of a sitcom' once in awhile (or even all of the time). As long as the goal of making the audience laugh is achieved, that’s sometimes all you really need from a sitcom. But Brooklyn Nine-Nine has shown itself to be a series that can do so much more, and that's where the need for it to be so much more comes from. Having the knowledge or at least faith that the show won't simply rely on such tropes on a regular basis is part of what prevents 'Beach House' from being a mess. (Also, it's pretty darn funny.) This is a show with writers and a cast that work too hard to even allow it to be a mess. 'Beach House' is fun, and you know what? Maybe that’s all that an episode needs to be right now coming off of hiatus."

Allie Pape from Vulture gave the show a 3 star rating out of 5 and wrote, "But while the conflicts in 'Beach House' are feather-light, the episode has a fun, easygoing vibe that B99's frequent juggling of multiple plot threads often obviates. Vacation Terry's commitment to his fanny pack, what happens when Amy gets extra-drunk, and Scully and Hitchcock's desire to rope Holt into investing in an offshore casino are barely plotlines, but they fall nicely into the overarching sense of relaxation and play in the episode, and even when they don't necessarily go anywhere (I could have told you at minute four that Six-Drink Amy was a depressive, something even the show found so unfunny after all the hype that it didn't even bother to elaborate on it), it's a pleasant, meandering ride with plenty of good jokes to spare."

Alan Sepinwall of HitFix wrote, "'Beach House' was yet another episode of the season where the four-act structure resulted in a super abrupt ending – Captain Holt and the detectives are finally enjoying each other's company, and then BOOM!, cut to the production company logos – but everything leading up to that was pretty terrific." Andy Crump of Paste gave the episode an 8.9 and wrote, "It's such a great moment that its quick passing almost feels like a stumbling block. But, just as we accept the things Boyle, Terry, Gina, et al do as being in character, so too is Holt's reconciliation with Peralta a perfectly Holtish thing to do. And so 'Beach House' ends as it begins, with a terrific Braugher punchline delivered as only he could. Brooklyn Nine-Nine wasn't on break that long, but it's great to have it back; similarly, 'Beach House' isn’t a plot-pushing episode, but it's great to see so much attention placed on the characters. After all, they're what we tune in for week in and week out."
