= Det. Dave Majors =

- Brooklyn Nine-Nine episode
- Episode no.: Season 2 Episode 21
- Directed by: Michael McDonald
- Written by: Gabe Liedman & Lakshmi Sundaram
- Cinematography by: Giovani Lampassi
- Editing by: Cortney Carrillo; Sandra Montiel
- Production code: 220
- Original air date: May 3, 2015
- Running time: 22 minutes

Guest appearances
- Garret Dillahunt as Dave Majors; Gabe Liedman as Oliver Cox; Cedric Yarbrough as Steve

Episode chronology
← Previous "AC/DC"	Next → "The Chopper"
- Brooklyn Nine-Nine season 2

"Det. Dave Majors" is the twenty-first episode of the second season of the American television police sitcom series Brooklyn Nine-Nine. It is the 43rd overall episode of the series and is written by Gabe Liedman & Lakshmi Sundaram and directed by Michael McDonald. It aired on Fox in the United States on May 3, 2015.

The show revolves around the fictitious 99th precinct of the New York Police Department in Brooklyn and the officers and detectives that work in the precinct. In the episode, Jake and Amy are assigned to work on a case with a veteran detective named Dave Majors. Jake is ecstatic to work with him, until he finds that he plans to ask Amy to go on a date with him. Meanwhile, Terry is offered a new job with much better treatment and payment, prompting Boyle and Gina to try to convince him otherwise.

The episode was seen by an estimated 2.72 million household viewers and gained a 1.2/4 ratings share among adults aged 18–49, according to Nielsen Media Research. The episode received positive reviews from critics, who praised the cold open, Andy Samberg's performance, and Dillahunt's guest performance.

== Plot ==
In the cold open, the squad is surprised to see Rosa wearing a pink shirt. Boyle questions why they don't make fun of her for it, but it leads to them teasing him about a purple tie he wore in the past.

Jake (Andy Samberg) and Amy (Melissa Fumero) are investigating some robberies in the area when they're informed that they'll work with respected Major Crimes Detective Dave Majors (Garret Dillahunt) from another precinct as a joint case. This makes both of them ecstatic as they both admire his work.

While working on the case, Majors takes Jake with him to a "cop only" bar for a drink. While Jake is at first happy to work with him, Majors tells Jake that he plans to ask Amy out on a date when they finish the case. This worries Jake, as he still has feelings for Amy. Throughout the day, he tries to ask Amy to go out with him but fails at every occasion. After the case is over, Majors takes Amy to the bar while Jake tries to intervene but he is stopped by the doorman (Cedric Yarbrough). The next day, Jake finds that Amy turned down the date, as she doesn't want to date cops, disappointing Jake. However, it's revealed that Amy also has feelings for Jake.

Meanwhile, Holt (Andre Braugher) meets with Gary Shaw (Craig Stepp), thinking Shaw wants to give him a new job position at his private security firm due to wanting to recruit Holt for years. However, Shaw reveals that he intends to offer the job to Terry (Terry Crews), who wants the job as he needs money with a new baby on the way. Seeing this, Boyle (Joe Lo Truglio) and Gina (Chelsea Peretti) try to show Terry the benefits of the precinct, only for Holt to continue giving him more work and stress. The next day, Terry reveals he turned down the offer, as Holt's assignments show him that he loves his job.

== Reception ==
=== Viewers ===
In its original American broadcast, "Det. Dave Majors" was seen by an estimated 2.72 million household viewers and gained a 1.2/4 ratings share among adults aged 18–49, according to Nielsen Media Research. This was a slight decrease in viewership from the previous episode, which was watched by 2.78 million viewers with a 1.5/4 in the 18-49 demographics. This means that 1.2 percent of all households with televisions watched the episode, while 4 percent of all households watching television at that time watched it. With these ratings, Brooklyn Nine-Nine was the fourth most watched show on FOX for the night, beating Bob's Burgers, but behind The Simpsons, The Last Man on Earth and Family Guy, third on its timeslot and eight for the night, behind Revenge, The Simpsons, The Last Man on Earth, America's Funniest Home Videos, Family Guy, Once Upon a Time, and Secrets and Lies.

=== Critical reviews ===
"Det. Dave Majors" received positive reviews from critics. Kayla Kumari Upadhyaya of The A.V. Club gave the episode an "A−" grade and wrote, "'Det. Dave Majors' brings back that competitive nature, if only for part of an episode, with Jake and Amy competing to get on Detective Dave Majors (the fantastic Garret Dillahunt) of the 9-3's good side in a joint, baby mask, check cashing robbery case (which is just as weird as it sounds, though less consequential)." Allie Pape from Vulture gave the show a perfect 5 star rating out of 5 and wrote, "My biggest issue with Brooklyn Nine-Nine continues to be how many episodes go by without the characters actually wanting much of anything. So 'Det. Dave Majors' was a blast of barrelproof whiskey-scented fresh air with a delightfully fizzy orange-soda back."

Alan Sepinwall of HitFix wrote, "Fortunately, the slow-burning flirtation between Peralta and Santiago has consistently been an area where taking Jake seriously has worked, and we got another strong example of that in the well-balanced 'Det. Dave Majors.'" Andy Crump of Paste gave the episode an 8.9 rating and wrote, "'Det. Dave Majors' feels like a much-needed shot in the arm to that flagging storyline. At worst, the episode hinges on a guest appearance by the reliably terrific Garret Dillahunt, who lends his many and varied talents toward portraying the hotshot detective of the title."
