= Payback (Brooklyn Nine-Nine) =

- Brooklyn Nine-Nine episode
- Episode no.: Season 2 Episode 13
- Directed by: Victor Nelli Jr.
- Written by: Norm Hiscock & Brigitte Munoz-Liebowitz
- Cinematography by: Giovani Lampassi
- Editing by: Sandra Montiel
- Production code: 213
- Original air date: January 11, 2015
- Running time: 22 minutes

Guest appearances
- Merrin Dungey as Sharon Jeffords; Allen Evangelista as Savant

Episode chronology
← Previous "Beach House"	Next → "The Defense Rests"
- Brooklyn Nine-Nine season 2

"Payback" is the thirteenth episode of the second season of the American television police sitcom series Brooklyn Nine-Nine. It is the 35th overall episode of the series and is written by Norm Hiscock & Brigitte Munoz-Liebowitz and directed by Victor Nelli Jr. It aired on Fox in the United States on January 11, 2015.

The show revolves around the fictitious 99th precinct of the New York Police Department in Brooklyn and the officers and detectives that work in the precinct. In the episode, Terry asks Jake to pay back money he owes him and Jake finds out Terry's wife is pregnant, therefore, he needs the money. He decides to pay Terry, but the rest of the precinct's suspicion causes Jake to hold it off by settling debts and doing favors. Meanwhile, Amy is ecstatic to work with Holt on a case, but not everything works out.

The episode was seen by an estimated 3.29 million household viewers and gained a 1.5/4 ratings share among adults aged 18–49, according to Nielsen Media Research. The episode received generally positive reviews from critics, who praised Andy Samberg's performance but the plot of the episode received criticism.

== Plot ==
In the cold open, Rosa asks the squad for tips on how to celebrate Marcus's birthday.

Terry (Terry Crews) asks Jake (Andy Samberg) for owed money, which surprises Jake, as Terry doesn't usually seek the money he's loaned Jake back. After a little investigation, Terry admits to Jake that his wife is expecting another baby and he needs the money to cover the costs. Jake decides to give him money and asks to be the child's godfather, to which Terry says he will consider if he keeps silent about the secret for a month.

The other detectives begin to suspect Terry and Jake's behavior, so Jake decides to pay them back by settling their debts and doing favors for them. However, he accidentally sends an e-mail to the whole precinct, revealing the pregnancy of Terry's wife. After convincing everyone to remain quiet about the secret, Jake distracts Terry while the rest of the squad deletes his e-mail. However, Holt (Andre Braugher) congratulates Terry and his wife on the news, upsetting him. Jake then gives Terry the rest of the money by selling his car, which surprises Terry. Terry decides to let Jake be the godfather.

Meanwhile, Amy (Melissa Fumero) finds a mistake in one of Holt's old cases and is ecstatic, as she will work with Holt on the case. However, Holt solves the case quickly and both set out to find the case's real culprit. While waiting in the car, they decide to eat street food which Amy recommends. They soon find out that the culprit died months ago and Holt experiences food poisoning due to Amy's food selection. Amy worries that these setbacks will sour her relationship with Holt. However, he reassures her that even the worst incidents can help strengthen a bond.

== Reception ==
=== Viewers ===
In its original American broadcast, "Payback" was seen by an estimated 3.29 million household viewers and gained a 1.5/4 ratings share among adults aged 18–49, according to Nielsen Media Research. This was a 47% decrease in viewership from the previous episode, which was watched by 6.12 million viewers with a 3.0/8 in the 18-49 demographics. This means that 1.5 percent of all households with televisions watched the episode, while 4 percent of all households watching television at that time watched it. With these ratings, Brooklyn Nine-Nine was the fourth most watched show on FOX for the night, behind Bob's Burgers, Madam Secretary, Family Guy, and The Simpsons, fourth on its timeslot and seventh for the night, behind Bob's Burgers, Family Guy, The Simpsons, 60 Minutes, the 72nd Golden Globe Awards, and an NFL game.

=== Critical reviews ===
"Payback" received generally positive reviews from critics. LaToya Ferguson of The A.V. Club gave the episode a "B−" grade and wrote, "So having 'Payback' be an episode that features the very late 1990s/early 2000s trope of the accidental message to the world at large and, to a lesser extent, a rhyming bit that ends in toilet humor, it almost feels like this episode of the culmination of the show's odd, increasingly predictable pattern. Where 'Stakeout' at least made the 'no-no list' a gateway to an honest look into the relationship between Jake and Boyle, 'Payback' takes the Jake and Terry dynamic that was so fascinating back in 'Chocolate Milk' and somewhat sullies it with a couple of tired tropes." Allie Pape from Vulture gave the show a perfect 5 star rating out of 5 and wrote, "Given the potential seriousness of its A plot, it's all the more impressive that 'Payback' is one of the show's funniest episodes ever on a line-to-line level, eliciting some straight-up guffaws over on my couch."

Alan Sepinwall of HitFix wrote, "They've done better this season, but 'Payback' was still fun. I just wish they could do something about the four-act formatting, but I can't imagine FOX giving in on this stupid point, unfortunately." Andy Crump of Paste gave the episode a 7.8 and wrote, "The episode fits nicely into Brooklyn Nine-Nine's canon — it's a big old reference guide to any number of Season Two plot threads — which lends it an air of belonging. 'Payback' is a solid bit of connective tissue. It's the easy story writing that ends up taking it down a couple of pegs."
