= Cedric Yarbrough =

American actor (born 1973)

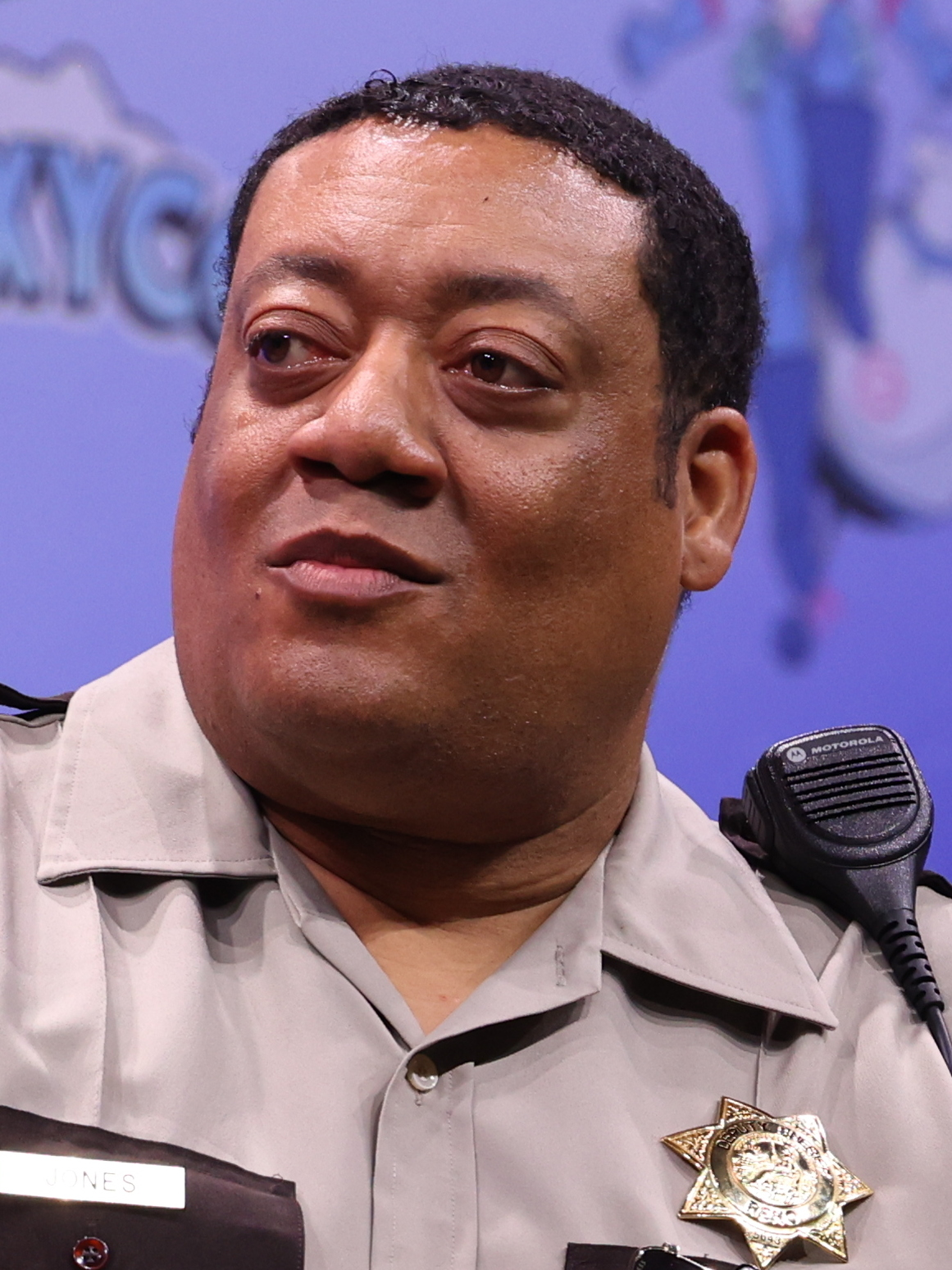
- Yarbrough as Deputy Jones at GalaxyCon Richmond in 2025
- Born: March 20, 1973 (age 53); Burnsville, Minnesota, U.S.
- Occupations: Actor; comedian
- Years active: 2000–present

Cedric Yarbrough (/ˈsiːdrɪk/ SEE-drick; born March 20, 1973) is an American actor and comedian. He has starred in the series Reno 911! as Deputy S. Jones and as Kenneth on the ABC sitcom Speechless, as well as voicing Gerald Fitzgerald on the Netflix comedy Paradise PD, Officer Meow Meow Fuzzyface on the Netflix comedy-drama BoJack Horseman, and Tom DuBois and Colonel H. Stinkmeaner on the Adult Swim sitcom The Boondocks.

== Early life ==
Yarbrough, who is of African-American heritage, was born in Burnsville, Minnesota. He attended Burnsville Senior High School and later Minnesota State University, Mankato. He is also an alumnus of Dudley Riggs's Brave New Workshop in Minneapolis.

== Career ==
Yarbrough starred as Deputy S. (Sven) Jones in the television series Reno 911!, which aired from 2003 to 2009 on Comedy Central. The series returned for a seventh season in 2020 on Quibi and for an eighth season in 2022 on The Roku Channel as Reno 911! Defunded. He also appeared in both of the feature length films, 2007's Reno 911!: Miami and 2021's Reno 911! The Hunt for QAnon.

He also starred in the film Meet the Fockers in 2004 in the role of a prison guard. Later, he provided the voice of Tom DuBois and Colonel H. Stinkmeaner on The Boondocks, Chocolate Giddy-up on Black Dynamite, and Firestorm in Justice League: Crisis on Two Earths.

From 2016–2019, he co-starred in the ABC sitcom Speechless as Kenneth Clements. He has also had recurring roles in series including The Goldbergs and Rake. On Carol's Second Act, which premiered in 2019, he stars as Nurse Dennis, which started out as a recurring role before being promoted to series regular early in the first season.

== Filmography ==
=== Film ===
Year	Title	Role	Notes
2000	Mulligan	King	
2004	Meet the Fockers	Prison Guard	
2005	The 40-Year-Old Virgin	Dad at Health Clinic	
2006	Unaccompanied Minors	Melvin Goldfinch	
2007	Cook Off!	Jericho	
2007	Reno 911!: Miami	Deputy S. Jones	
2007	Closing Escrow	Bobby	
2007	Entry Level	Sam	
2008	Drillbit Taylor	Bernie	
2008	Get Smart	Tate	
2008	Four Christmases	Stan	
2009	Black Dynamite	Chocolate Giddy-Up	
2009	Miss March	Doctor	
2010	Justice League: Crisis on Two Earths	Firestorm	Voice, direct-to-video
2012	Beverly Hills Chihuahua 3: Viva la Fiesta!	Hollis	Video
2013	I Know That Voice	Himself	Documentary film
2015	Justice League: Throne of Atlantis	Submarine Technician	Voice, direct-to-video
2015	Batman Unlimited: Monster Mayhem	Silas Stone	Voice, direct-to-video
2016	The Boss	Tito	
2016	Amateur Night	Zoley	
2017	The 60 Yard Line	David Cartwright	
2017	The House	Reggie	
2023	The Donor Party	Harrison	
2023	Please Don't Destroy: The Treasure of Foggy Mountain	Gates	
2024	Kung Fu Panda 4	Bull Officer #1 / Ram Foreman / Questioned Boar	Voice
2024	Unfrosted	Toucan Sam	
2024	Juror #2	Marcus	
TBA	Nutmeg & Mistletoe †	TBA	Post-production

=== Television ===
Year	Title	Role	Notes
2002	Andy Richter Controls the Universe	Other Andy	Episode: "The Second Episode"
2003	The Parkers	Brian	Episode: "The Mack Is Like Wo!"
2003–2009, 2020–2022	Reno 911!	Deputy S. Jones	123 episodes
2004	Arrested Development	Sergeant Baker	Episode: "Sad Sack"
2004	Broken	Doctor Tom	Short
2005	The Bernie Mac Show	Monroe	Episode: "Who Gives This Bride"
2005	The Bad Girl's Guide	Kip	Episode: "The Guide to Switching Partners"
2005	Love, Inc.	Matt	Episode: "Living Single"
2005–2014	The Boondocks	Tom DuBois, Colonel H. Stinkmeaner	Voice, 53 episodes
2009	Tracey Ullman's State of the Union		Episode #2.4
2009–2012	The Penguins of Madagascar	Officer X	Voice, 7 episodes
2010	Chuck	Neil	Episode: "Chuck Versus the Beard"
2010	Bones	Lawrence Belomo	Episode: "The Babe in the Bar"
2011	$h*! My Dad Says	Jimmy	Episode: "Well Suitored"
2011	Svetlana		Episode: "Milking It"
2011	Curb Your Enthusiasm	Customer #1	Episode: "Vow of Silence"
2011, 2013	Big Time Rush	Chief Lieutenant Officer, Detective	2 episodes
2012, 2014	Key & Peele	Ruben / Hunter	2 episodes
2012–2015	Black Dynamite	Chocolate Giddy-Up	Voice, 5 episodes
2012–2016	The Soul Man	Paul	5 episodes
2013	Ben and Kate	Loan Officer	Episode: "Girl Problems"
2013	Men at Work	Tony	Episode: "Will Work for Milo"
2013	Betas	Jon Carlo	Episode: "Takin' It to the Streets"
2013–2016	Comedy Bang! Bang!	Donald / Steve Smiley	5 episodes
2013–2023	The Goldbergs	Vic	23 episodes
2014	Rake	Jules	3 episodes
2014	Hot in Cleveland	LeBron	Voice, episode: "The Animated Episode"
2014	American Dad!	Security Guard	Voice, 2 episodes
2014	Benched	Morris	4 episodes
2014–2019	BoJack Horseman	Officer Meow-Meow Fuzzyface	Voice, 8 episodes
2014, 2023	Family Guy	Board Member / Lobster	Voice, 2 episodes
2015	Young & Hungry	Coleman	2 episodes
2015	Crazy Ex-Girlfriend	Calvin Young	2 episodes
2015	Brooklyn Nine-Nine	Steve	Episode: "Det. Dave Majors"
2015	Documentary Now!	Pawn Shop Owner	Episode: "The Eye Doesn't Lie"
2016	Bajillion Dollar Propertie$	Trent Adler	Episode: "Inside Joke"
2016	Baby Daddy	Tim Turner	Episode: "Stupid Cupid"
2016	Bella and the Bulldogs	Colonel Dixon	Episode: "Doggone Record Breaker"
2016	Ballers	Clyde Jackson	2 episodes
2016	Son of Zorn	Bill	Episode: "The Weekend Warrior"
2016–2018	Skylanders Academy	Broccoli Guy, Wind-up	Voice, 10 episodes
2016–2019	Speechless	Kenneth Clements	Main role, 63 episodes
2017	One Day at a Time	Jerry	Episode: "A Snowman's Tale"
2017	Blaze and the Monster Machines	Nelson	Voice, 5 episodes
2017	Mike Tyson Mysteries	Neil deGrasse Tyson	Voice, episode: "Help a Brother Out"
2017	Dice	Russell Patterson	4 episodes
2017–2018	We Bare Bears	Various	Voice, 2 episodes
2017–2018	New Looney Tunes	Eagle Scout	Voice, 3 episodes
2018–2019	Milo Murphy's Law	Khone	Voice, 3 episodes
2018–2022	Paradise PD	Gerald Fitzgerald	Voice, 40 episodes
2019	The Jellies!	Wesley Patterson	Voice, episode: "Crash for Cash"
2019–2020	Carol's Second Act	Nurse Dennis	17 episodes
2019–2022	Puppy Dog Pals	Hal Summers, Keido, Al, Darius's Dad	Voice, 5 episodes
2020	Where's Waldo?	Wizard Dustybeard	Voice, episode: "Riddle Me This, Egypt"
2021	Reno 911! The Hunt for QAnon	Deputy S. Jones	TV movie
2022	Reno 911! It's a Wonderful Heist	Deputy S. Jones	TV movie
2023	Last Week Tonight with John Oliver	Ron	Episode: "HOAs"
2023	Lucky Hank	Paul Rourke	Main cast
2023	Star Wars: Visions	Old Prisoner	Voice, episode: "The Pit"
2023	The Muppets Mayhem	Police Officer Axl	Episode: "Track 6: Fortunate Son"
2023	Fired on Mars	Jaxton Olivier	Voice, 6 episodes
2023	Captain Fall	Chief O'Neil	Voice, 3 episodes
2023	Strange Planet	Various	Voice, 2 episodes
2024	Not Dead Yet	Paul	Episode: "Not Solved Yet"
2024	Rock Paper Scissors	Rock's Dad	Voice, episode: "The Family Business"
2024	That '90s Show	Otis	Episode: "Life Is a Highway"
2024–2025	Krapopolis	Kolax	Voice, 15 episodes
2024–2026	Batman: Caped Crusader	Rupert Thorne, Linton Midnite, Waylon Jones, Judge	Voice, 7 episodes
2025	Hamster & Gretel	The Handyman	Voice, episode: "Last Train to Dullsville/Fred of State"
2025	The Neighborhood	Grant	Episode: "Welcome to the Sting"
2025	Leverage: Redemption	Mayor Armond Bruster	Episode: "The Shakedown in Clone-Town Job"
2025	Haunted Hotel	Additional voices	Voice, 3 episodes
2025	All's Fair	Det. Ray Delgado	Episode: "Everybody Dance Now"
2026	Hey A.J.!	Neon Cleon	Voice, episode: "Building Blockers/Bein' Neon Cleon"
2026	Strip Law		Voice, 2 episodes
2026	Ghosts	Chief Manningham	Episode: "The Investor"
2026	Bob's Burgers	Repairman	Voice, episode: "Stuck in the Middle with Hu(go)"
2026	King of the Hill		Voice, episode: "Hank Ruffles Some Feathers"

=== Theatre ===
Year	Title	Role	Venue
2003	Aladdin	Sultan	Disney's California Adventure, Hyperion Theater
2026	Iceboy!	Floyd Richards	Chicago, Goodman Theatre
