= The Chopper =

- Brooklyn Nine-Nine episode
- Episode no.: Season 2 Episode 22
- Directed by: Phil Traill
- Written by: Tricia McAlpin & David Phillips
- Cinematography by: Giovani Lampassi
- Editing by: Sandra Montiel
- Production code: 221
- Original air date: May 10, 2015
- Running time: 22 minutes

Guest appearances
- Kyra Sedgwick as Madeline Wuntch; Mo Gaffney as Dr. Susman

Episode chronology
← Previous "Det. Dave Majors"	Next → "Johnny and Dora"
- Brooklyn Nine-Nine season 2

"The Chopper" is the twenty-second episode of the second season of the American television police sitcom series Brooklyn Nine-Nine. It is the 44th overall episode of the series and is written by Tricia McAlpin & David Phillips and directed by Phil Traill. It aired on Fox in the United States on May 10, 2015.

The show revolves around the fictitious 99th precinct of the New York Police Department in Brooklyn and the officers and detectives that work in the precinct. In the episode, Jake and Boyle are assigned to a high-profile bank robber case with Wuntch's full support but Holt decides to involve himself, as he is suspicious of her. Meanwhile, Terry and the rest of the precinct conduct a field trip for children and show them the precinct but Amy ends up traumatizing them.

The episode was seen by an estimated 2.56 million household viewers and gained a 1.3/4 ratings share among adults aged 18–49, according to Nielsen Media Research. The episode received positive reviews from critics, who praised Holt's character development as well as the writing.

== Plot ==
In the cold open, the squad competes over who can get Gina to look away from her phone. Terry ends up winning by changing his relationship status online, but upsets his wife in the process.

Jake (Andy Samberg) and Boyle (Joe Lo Truglio) are investigating a years-old bank robbery where the money was never recovered and two of the four robbers have been murdered since they were all released from prison. Lacking resources, they ask Deputy Chief Wuntch (Kyra Sedgwick) for help. To their surprise, she accepts to support the operation, even providing them with a helicopter.

While Jake and Boyle are ecstatic, Holt (Andre Braugher) is suspicious of Wuntch's intentions. In order to find out, he decides to join the operation in the field. After interrogating the third ex-convict and putting him in custody, they fly to a farm to find the last remaining ex-con who is now suspected of having murdered the others to keep all the money for himself. However, they find him dead and the ex-con in custody has escaped, upsetting Holt. After being given advice by Jake, Holt conducts another investigation and they find the suspect in a basement with all the money. While Jake and Boyle are lauded as heroes, Wuntch tells Holt that she wanted him to have the success so that he could get a promotion to a desk job and leave the precinct, shocking him.

Meanwhile, Terry (Terry Crews) tells the precinct that a school is planning a field trip to the precinct and asks for help in conducting it accordingly. While the trip starts well, Amy (Melissa Fumero) and Rosa (Stephanie Beatriz) decide to show the kids photos of many corpses and crime scenes, ending up traumatizing them and causing the instructor to leave in disgust. However, Amy manages to prove to the instructor that the kids managed to learn more about the forensic science, impressing her.

== Reception ==
=== Viewers ===
In its original American broadcast, "The Chopper" was seen by an estimated 2.56 million household viewers and gained a 1.3/4 ratings share among adults aged 18–49, according to Nielsen Media Research. This was a slight decrease in viewership from the previous episode, which was watched by 2.72 million viewers with a 1.2/4 in the 18-49 demographics. This means that 1.3 percent of all households with televisions watched the episode, while 4 percent of all households watching television at that time watched it. With these ratings, Brooklyn Nine-Nine was the most watched show on FOX for the night, beating Bob's Burgers, Family Guy, and The Simpsons, second on its timeslot and fourth for the night, behind Revenge, America's Funniest Home Videos, and Once Upon a Time.

=== Critical reviews ===
"The Chopper" received positive reviews from critics. Kayla Kumari Upadhyaya of The A.V. Club gave the episode a "B+" grade and wrote, "As the penultimate episode of season two, 'The Chopper' clearly ends up mostly being the set up for the finale, but it's still a very solid episode with a good A-plot." Allie Pape from Vulture gave the show a 4 star rating out of 5 and wrote, "You could practically feel the collective childlike glee of Brooklyn Nine-Nine's entire creative team in the moment that gives its episode this title: Peralta, Boyle, and Holt jumping into a field from a real-life helicopter." Andy Crump of Paste gave the episode a 9.0 rating and wrote, "Maybe the lack of poise in the B-plot is a good thing, though. If interoffice feuding gives 'The Chopper' its engine, exemplary fatherhood is its anchor."
