= Phil Traill =

British television and film director (born 1973)

- Born: June 6, 1973 (age 53); New Jersey, U.S.
- Occupations: Film and television director
- Years active: 1998–present

Phil Traill (born June 6, 1973) is a British television and film director.

== Biography ==
Traill was born in New Jersey but moved to London at the age of six. There, he attended and graduated from Newcastle University with a degree in English and film studies.

He started his career in the UK by directing short films, TV shows and music videos for leading production companies. In 2006, he moved back to the United States, currently living in Los Angeles. Since moving to the US, Traill has directed over 100 episodes of American television.

== Filmography ==
=== Writer ===
- Opal Dream (2006)

=== Director ===
- All About Steve (2009)
- Chalet Girl (2011)
- Good Burger 2 (2023)

=== Television ===
| Year | Show | Notes |
|---|---|---|
| 2009–2010 | 10 Things I Hate About You | 2 episodes |
| 2009–2011 | Men of a Certain Age | 3 episodes |
| 2009 | Cougar Town | Episode: "Two Gunslingers" |
| 2012–2018 | The Middle | 25 episodes |
| 2014 | Selfie | Episode: "Un-Tag My Heart" |
| 2015 | Brooklyn Nine-Nine | Episode: "The Chopper" |
| 2015 | Black-ish | Episode: "Andre From Marseille" |
| 2015 | The Last Man on Earth | Episode: "Sweet Melissa" |
| 2015 | The Grinder | Episode: "Dedicating This One to the Crew" |
| 2015 | Modern Family | Episode: "Thunk in the Trunk" |
| 2016 | The Real O'Neals | Episode: "The Real Spring Fever" |
| 2018 | Alex, Inc. | Episode: "The Internet Trolls" |
| 2018 | I Feel Bad | Episode: "We're Not Fun Anymore" |
| 2019–2020 | Good Girls | 3 episodes |
| 2022–2023 | Single Drunk Female | 3 episodes |
| 2022–2023 | American Auto | 2 episodes |
| 2025 | Grosse Pointe Garden Society | 2 episodes |
