= Stakeout (Brooklyn Nine-Nine) =

- Brooklyn Nine-Nine episode
- Episode no.: Season 2 Episode 11
- Directed by: Tristram Shapeero
- Written by: Laura McCreary & Tricia McAlpin
- Cinematography by: Giovani Lampassi
- Editing by: Sandra Montiel
- Production code: 211
- Original air date: December 14, 2014
- Running time: 22 minutes

Guest appearances
- Kyra Sedgwick as Madeline Wuntch; Nick Cannon as Marcus; Marc Evan Jackson as Kevin Cozner

Episode chronology
← Previous "The Pontiac Bandit Returns"	Next → "Beach House"
- Brooklyn Nine-Nine season 2

"Stakeout" is the eleventh episode of the second season of the American television police sitcom series Brooklyn Nine-Nine. It is the 33rd overall episode of the series and is written by Laura McCreary & Tricia McAlpin and directed by Tristram Shapeero. It aired on Fox in the United States on December 14, 2014.

== Plot ==
After Holt (Andre Braugher), Jake (Andy Samberg), and Rosa (Stephanie Beatriz) are honored by Deputy Wuntch (Kyra Sedgwick), the precinct is informed about a possible lead into Alexei Bisko (Dimiter Marinov), a Ukrainian mobster. In order to monitor the possible drop-house, two squads must lead a stakeout in a condemned hotel over 8 days. Jake and Boyle (Joe Lo Truglio) volunteer to cover the eight days.

On day 2, Jake becomes annoyed by Boyle's habit of chewing with his mouth open and Boyle is annoyed by Jake's eating habits. They decide to create a "no-no list" so they both can't do certain things. However, as the time passes, the lists keeps growing to the point of putting the operation in jeopardy. During a fight that ends their friendship, an angered Boyle throws a ball through the window, which alerts the drop-house and ruins the operation. Forced by Holt to check door to door, Jake and Boyle catch Bisko and rekindle their friendship.

Amy (Melissa Fumero) and Gina (Chelsea Peretti) find some drawings Terry (Terry Crews) has done for a book he plans to give to his daughters. The drawings are based on people in the precinct. However, they read the story and find their characters are bad representations of themselves and confront Terry. Terry defends it, stating that the characterizations are "nonsense". Meanwhile, Rosa meets Holt's nephew, Marcus (Nick Cannon). She ends up forming a relationship with him, which leaves Holt in an uncomfortable state.

== Reception ==
=== Viewers ===
In its original American broadcast, "Stakeout" was seen by an estimated 3.52 million household viewers and gained a 1.5/4 ratings share among adults aged 18–49, according to Nielsen Media Research. This was a 19% decrease in viewership from the previous episode, which was watched by 4.32 million viewers with a 2.1/6 in the 18-49 demographics. This means that 1.5 percent of all households with televisions watched the episode, while 4 percent of all households watching television at that time watched it. With these ratings, Brooklyn Nine-Nine was the second most watched show on FOX for the night, beating Bob's Burgers and Family Guy but behind The Simpsons, fifth on its timeslot and sixth for the night, behind Once Upon a Time, Undercover Boss, The Simpsons, Football Night in America, and NBC Sunday Night Football.

=== Critical reviews ===
"Stakeout" received positive reviews from critics. LaToya Ferguson of The A.V. Club gave the episode a "B+" grade and wrote, "This is simply a typical (which is by no means an insult) Brooklyn Nine-Nine episode to end the year. Still, 'Stakeout' is a highly funny episode that maintains the second season's hot streak right now."

Jackson McHenry of Entertainment Weekly wrote, "'Stakeout' had three plots that linked thematically, but Brooklyn Nine-Nine never had them intersect. This is a division that pops up in most episodes, and while it works, the show could benefit from some more formal experimentation."

Allie Pape from Vulture gave the show a 3 star rating out of 5 and wrote, "Boyle and Peralta's ride-or-die friendship is one of the bedrocks of Brooklyn Nine-Nine, so it makes sense that the show would eventually find a way to test it. But it turns out that turning these best bros against each other is not only kinda sad, it's also not that funny."
