= The Apartment (Brooklyn Nine-Nine) =

- Brooklyn Nine-Nine episode
- Episode no.: Season 1 Episode 18
- Directed by: Tucker Gates
- Written by: David Quandt
- Cinematography by: Giovani Lampassi
- Editing by: Sandra Montiel
- Production code: 118
- Original air date: February 25, 2014
- Running time: 22 minutes

Guest appearances
- Matt Walsh as Lohank; Dirk Blocker as Michael Hitchcock; Joel McKinnon Miller as Norm Scully; Brian Huskey as Mr. Henders; Bob McCracken as Frank Spond

Episode chronology
← Previous "Full Boyle"	Next → "Tactical Village"
- Brooklyn Nine-Nine season 1

"The Apartment" is the eighteenth episode of the first season of the American television police sitcom series Brooklyn Nine-Nine. Written by David Quandt and directed by Tucker Gates, it aired on Fox on February 25, 2014 in the United States.

In the episode, Jake is notified that his apartment is going through new rules. He must pay additional money if he wants to keep it. Meanwhile, Holt conducts interrogatories for each detective. The episode was seen by an estimated 2.66 million household viewers and gained a 1.3/3 ratings share among adults aged 18–49, according to Nielsen Media Research. The episode received mostly positive reviews from critics, who praised Andy Samberg's performance, the cold open, and the writing.

== Plot ==
In the cold open, Jake ends up accidentally calling Holt "Dad" while interrogating a robbery suspect, leading the rest of the precinct to make fun of him while also getting the suspect to admit his alibi was a lie.

Jake Peralta (Andy Samberg) has been living in his deceased grandmother's apartment. He learns that it is going co-op but due to ignoring his mail, only finds out the day of the deadline, and he will have to pay nearly a half million dollars to keep living there. After finding out that he is bankrupt due to frivolous spending, he goes to a loan shark for a down payment, but when it fails, Gina Linetti (Chelsea Peretti) convinces him to search for a new apartment instead. When there do not appear to be a lot of good options, Gina offers to buy the apartment to rent to him. Hating the idea of her being his new landlord, he kicks her out. After some reflection, Jake ultimately apologizes to Gina and suggests that she buys his apartment for herself (as she is also attached to it having visited it multiple times growing up) while he will sublet her apartment.

Raymond Holt (Andre Braugher) starts collecting self-evaluations from the detectives, leading to much stress within the department, especially for Amy Santiago (Melissa Fumero), who struggles to realize what her biggest flaw is. Terry eventually confronts him about it, and Holt compliments him for standing up for his squad. After a discussion with Jake, Amy realizes her biggest weakness is she's overly concerned of what Holt thinks of her.

Charles Boyle (Joe Lo Truglio) and Rosa Diaz (Stephanie Beatriz) take revenge on unhygienic co-worker Lohank (Matt Walsh), who uses Rosa's desk on the weekend shift. Ultimately, they end up feeling sympathy for him after he tells them sad details about his personal life. Later, as they leave work, Boyle apologizes to Diaz for his behavior being weird in trying to ask her out over the last year.

== Reception ==
=== Viewers ===
In its original American broadcast, "The Apartment" was seen by an estimated 2.66 million household viewers and gained a 1.3/3 ratings share among adults aged 18–49, according to Nielsen Media Research. This was an 8% decrease in viewership from the previous episode, which was watched by 2.88 million viewers with a 1.2/3 in the 18-49 demographics. This means that 1.3 percent of all households with televisions watched the episode, while 3 percent of all households watching television at that time watched it. With these ratings, Brooklyn Nine-Nine was the second most watched show on FOX for the night, beating Glee but behind New Girl, fifth on its timeslot and tenth for the night, behind New Girl, Person of Interest, Chicago Fire, a rerun of Growing Up Fisher, NCIS: Los Angeles, a rerun of About a Boy, The Bachelor, NCIS, and The Voice.

=== Critical reviews ===
"The Apartment" received mostly positive reviews from critics. Roth Cornet of IGN gave the episode a "great" 8.8 out of 10 and wrote, "'The Apartment' gave each of the characters an opportunity to grow, while staying true to what we've know of them. Mixing up the pairings always yields interesting results, and there was something appealing about the idea that Jake's childhood muck-up buddy Gina has somehow sailed past him on the maturity barometer. I don't know what the world would look like with a Hitchcock sans a Scully, though."

Molly Eichel of The A.V. Club gave the episode a "B−" grade and wrote, "Maybe the Gina fluctuations wouldn't have been as noticeable if the other characters hadn’t participated in plots that only highlighted their already well-worn tropes. Brooklyn Nine-Nine has eschewed the natural fallback of police work that characterized the season's earlier episodes to instead focus on the inter-office relationships of its characters. These plots could have really happened on any other show."

Alan Sepinwall of HitFix wrote, "'The Apartment' tried to pull off a trick the show tried earlier in the season in 'Pontiac Bandit,' by giving one of the characters a relationship with Jake that preceded their assignment to this precinct. That time, it was Peralta and Diaz as police academy classmates; here, it's that Jake and Gina are such close friends dating back to childhood that Jake got her the job as a department aide."
