= USPIS (Brooklyn Nine-Nine) =

- Brooklyn Nine-Nine episode
- Episode no.: Season 2 Episode 8
- Directed by: Ken Whittingham
- Written by: Brian Reich
- Cinematography by: Giovani Lampassi
- Editing by: Sandra Montiel
- Production code: 207
- Original air date: November 23, 2014
- Running time: 22 minutes

Guest appearance
- Ed Helms as Jack Danger

Episode chronology
← Previous "Lockdown"	Next → "The Road Trip"
- Brooklyn Nine-Nine season 2

"USPIS" is the eighth episode of the second season of the American television police sitcom series Brooklyn Nine-Nine. It is the 30th overall episode of the series and is written by Brian Reich and directed by Ken Whittingham. It aired on Fox in the United States on November 23, 2014. It was the seventh episode of the season to be produced but the eighth to be broadcast.

In the episode, Rosa is leading a task force focusing on the "Giggle Pig" drug and enlists Jake to participate in the operation. They also need to work with United States Postal Inspection Service (USPIS) and are partnered with the incompetent Agent Jack Danger (Ed Helms). Meanwhile, Holt and Terry seek to help Amy overcome her cigarette addiction. The episode was seen by an estimated 3.04 million household viewers and gained a 1.5/4 ratings share among adults aged 18–49, according to Nielsen Media Research. The episode received critical acclaim from critics, who praised Ed Helms' guest performance, the cast and the writing in particular and noting it as one of the show's best episodes.

== Plot ==
In the cold open the squad members are informed that they missed Scully's birthday party. They pool in money to compensate, though it's revealed to be a ploy by Hitchcock and Scully.

Rosa (Stephanie Beatriz) is leading a task force on "Giggle Pig" drug operations and asks Jake (Andy Samberg) to participate in the force but asks him and Boyle (Joe Lo Truglio) to get help from the USPIS due to the drug operations' use of post boxes.

Terry (Terry Crews), Holt (Andre Braugher) and Gina (Chelsea Peretti) begin to note Amy (Melissa Fumero) acting strangely and soon find out that she has decided to quit her tobacco addiction, but is having trouble due to stress. Terry tries to help her overcome it with the same techniques he used for his overeating addiction but fails. Holt and Gina also try to help her with exercise and meditation respectively but she still fails to pass it. Holt manages to make her see that she's just being an extreme perfectionist and tells her she should reconsider her issues.

Jake and Boyle visit USPIS Agent Jack Danger (pronounced 'Donger') (Ed Helms), who is self-righteous and incompetent, believing the USPIS to be superior to the NYPD as well as other federal agencies. During an investigation to find where the drug is supplied through mailboxes, Danger's ineptitude stops Jake from catching a supplier. When Danger refuses to lend them a list with the suspects unless they go with USPIS's methods, Jake and Boyle steal the list and arrest the supplier. However, their actions receive punishment as their case is handed to USPIS. Jake, realizing that this reflects poorly on Rosa, decides to apologize to Danger, who decides to hand back the case, though not without Jake enduring a boring and longwinded lecture about the history of the U.S. Postal Service. The Nine-Nine and USPIS lead a raid on a drug ring and arrest everyone inside, although Danger knocks himself out by the entrance.

== Reception ==
=== Viewers ===
In its original American broadcast, "USPIS" was seen by an estimated 3.04 million household viewers and gained a 1.5/4 ratings share among adults aged 18–49, according to Nielsen Media Research. This was a 33% decrease in viewership from the previous episode, which was watched by 4.53 million viewers with a 2.2/5 in the 18-49 demographics. This means that 1.5 percent of all households with televisions watched the episode, while 4 percent of all households watching television at that time watched it. With these ratings, Brooklyn Nine-Nine was the second most watched show on FOX for the night, beating Mulaney, Bob's Burgers and Family Guy but behind The Simpsons, fifth on its timeslot and sixth for the night, behind The Simpsons, Madam Secretary, American Music Awards of 2014, Football Night in America, and NBC Sunday Night Football.

=== Critical reviews ===
"USPIS" received critical acclaim from critics. LaToya Ferguson of The A.V. Club gave the episode an "A" grade and wrote, "As it turns out, all Brooklyn Nine-Nine needed to get back into the swing of things is to up the penis and butt jokes. That's mostly true of life too. 'USPIS' is an episode that's full of such simple — on paper — juvenile humor, and it's the strongest episode of the season for it."

Jackson McHenry of Entertainment Weekly wrote, "As much as I enjoyed the time spent with Danger, 'USPIS' gets most of its energy from the clash between Diaz and Jake. He's mad that he has to work with Danger. She's mad that he's making her task force look bad. The plot's an interesting look at how workplace friendships get twisted by shifts of power — they used to be equals, and now they have to recognize that they aren't — but it moves too quickly to fully register." Allie Pape from Vulture gave the show a 4 star rating out of 5 and wrote, "USPIS's reinterpretation of 'going postal' as a positive ('Maury went postal and brought in muffins for everyone!'), and Peralta's hilarious apology to Danger ('I'm sorry I said The Postman was a flop. I'm sorry I said that Forever stamps are a lie, because the Earth will eventually be swallowed by the sun') were among the many highlights. When it comes to delivering consistent laughs, this episode is proof positive that B99 is better than any RoboCop."

Alan Sepinwall of HitFix wrote, "'USPIS' is a classical type of sitcom episode, one that's built around a beloved guest star coming in to do his schtick while all the regular characters react to him doing it. But what happens when the guest and/or his schtick aren't so beloved anymore?" Andy Crump of Paste gave the episode a 9.0 and wrote, "If 'USPIS' stumbles, it's in the rushed climax, where we actually get to see about thirty seconds of cop action, as Diaz leads the charge to crack down on some Giggle Pig peddlers. But we don't watch Brooklyn Nine-Nine for the same reasons we watch, say, The Shield. We watch it for punchlines and for love of the Nine-Nine's officers. 'USPIS' emphasizes both wonderfully, while advancing Brooklyn Nine-Nine's diegesis. This isn't just a bounce back from 'Lockdown,' it's a high point for the season."
