= Tactical Village =

- Brooklyn Nine-Nine episode
- Episode no.: Season 1 Episode 19
- Directed by: Fred Goss
- Written by: Luke Del Tredici
- Cinematography by: Giovani Lampassi
- Editing by: Cortney Carrillo
- Production code: 119
- Original air date: March 4, 2014
- Running time: 22 minutes

Guest appearances
- Marilu Henner as Vivian Ludley; Kyle Bornheimer as Teddy Wells; Dirk Blocker as Michael Hitchcock; Joel McKinnon Miller as Norm Scully; Charlie Sanders as Ronnie

Episode chronology
← Previous "The Apartment"	Next → "Fancy Brudgom"
- Brooklyn Nine-Nine season 1

"Tactical Village" is the nineteenth episode of the first season of the American television police sitcom series Brooklyn Nine-Nine. The episode, written by co-executive producer Luke Del Tredici and directed by Fred Goss aired on Fox in the United States on March 4, 2014.

In the episode, the precinct must complete a course in a "tactical village" for operations training. While there, Amy runs into her ex-boyfriend Teddy Wells (Kyle Bornheimer), whom she may still have feelings for. Meanwhile, Rosa Diaz (Stephanie Beatriz) gets furious when she is not invited to Charles Boyle's (Joe Lo Truglio) wedding. Furthermore, Holt and Gina Linetti (Chelsea Peretti) get addicted to a mobile app. The episode was seen by an estimated 2.61 million household viewers and gained a 1.3/3 ratings share among adults aged 18–49, according to Nielsen Media Research. The episode received positive reviews from critics, who praised the cast and the setting for the episode.

== Plot ==
The precinct must attend a "tactical village" where they and other precincts run paintball simulations and test new equipment. Jake Peralta (Andy Samberg) and others in the squad are ecstatic, as they essentially get to fool around instead of meeting any actual training goals. Meanwhile, Charles Boyle (Joe Lo Truglio) gives save-the-date announcements for his wedding to everyone in the precinct except Rosa Diaz (Stephanie Beatriz). Despite saying that it does not affect her, she angrily fires a portable ultrasonic weapon and other weaponry in a passive-aggressive rage directed towards Boyle.

At the tactical village, Amy Santiago (Melissa Fumero) runs into her former boyfriend Teddy Wells (Kyle Bornheimer), which makes Peralta jealous. Upon learning that Teddy and his team have beaten the NYPD course record for fastest time, Peralta forgoes his previous intentions and rallies the squad to beat Teddy's record instead. Jeffords (Terry Crews) coordinates the precinct, while Scully (Joel McKinnon Miller) is instructed to have no involvement. The precinct succeeds in breaking the record.

While alone, Diaz confesses her feelings to Boyle and apologizes for her actions. This leads to Boyle stating that not inviting Rosa was Vivian's idea. After completing the training, the gang goes to a bar to celebrate. Boyle confesses to Diaz that he did not invite her because of his previous feelings for her, but ultimately decides to invite her anyway. To Peralta's dismay, Santiago decides to go on another date with Teddy. Meanwhile, Gina Linetti (Chelsea Peretti) introduces Raymond Holt (Andre Braugher) to a mobile app named Kwazy Kupcakes. Holt ends up becoming addicted to the game. When he learns that Michael Hitchcock (Dirk Blocker) is also at the same level in the game as him, he ends up dropping it.

At the celebration in the bar, both Holt and Gina agree that the game was 'stupid', but fun, lending to its simplicity and enticing qualities.

== Reception ==
=== Viewers ===
In its original American broadcast, "Tactical Village" was seen by an estimated 2.61 million household viewers and gained a 1.3/3 ratings share among adults aged 18–49, according to Nielsen Media Research. This was a slight decrease in viewership from the previous episode, which was watched by 2.66 million viewers with a 1.3/3 in the 18-49 demographics. This means that 1.3 percent of all households with televisions watched the episode, while 3 percent of all households watching television at that time watched it. With these ratings, Brooklyn Nine-Nine was the second most watched show on FOX for the night, beating Glee but behind New Girl, sixth on its timeslot and eleventh for the night, behind New Girl, The Goldbergs, Person of Interest, Agents of S.H.I.E.L.D., Growing Up Fisher, Chicago Fire, NCIS: Los Angeles, About a Boy, NCIS, and The Voice.

=== Critical reviews ===
"Tactical Village" received positive reviews from critics. Roth Cornet of IGN gave the episode a "great" 8 out of 10 and wrote, "'Tactical Village' put the focus on the burgeoning relationships in the series. Boyle and Diaz took a step forward, one back, and another forward in their renewed friendship. Meanwhile, Jake discovers that timing can be crucial when it comes to getting the trophy and the girl. There was a slightly disjointed feel to the episode on the whole, but the individual bits were hilarious."

Molly Eichel of The A.V. Club gave the episode an "A−" grade and wrote, "After a lackluster episode, Brooklyn Nine-Nine felt like it bounced back for 'Tactical Village.' This was a more mature episode, both structurally and in the way it pushed the relationships of each of its characters forward. 'Tactical Village' was ostensibly about team bonding, but its main plot didn't deal with the team as a whole. Instead, it looked at two central pairs, defining their paths for the rest of the season. Going into the homestretch, 'Tactical Village' had a depth to it that had been missing from the previous episodes, especially throughout the emotional lives of the characters."

Alan Sepinwall of HitFix wrote, "Really, though, we're at the point where unless they make a misstep or do something truly extraordinary, all I can say some weeks is that the show continues to bring its A-game, and I'm very pleased that I get to watch it."
