= Sea of Tranquility (novel) =

2022 novel by Emily St. John Mandel

- Cover of the first U.S. edition
- Author: Emily St. John Mandel
- Audio read by: John Lee, Dylan Moore, Arthur Morey, Kirsten Potter
- Language: English
- Publisher: Alfred A. Knopf (USA); Pan Macmillan (UK)
- Publication date: 5 April 2022
- Publication place: Canada
- Media type: Print (hardback)
- Pages: 255
- ISBN: 9780593321447 (First Edition U.S. Hardcover)
- OCLC: 1251739463
- Dewey Decimal: 813/.6
- LC Class: PR9199.4.M3347 S43 2022
- Website: www.emilymandel.com/sea-of-tranquility

Sea of Tranquility is a 2022 novel by the Canadian writer Emily St. John Mandel. It is Mandel's sixth novel and a work of speculative fiction.

Written during the COVID-19 pandemic, the novel considers "what constitutes reality, how time flows, and what memory is in the context of perception" by pondering the simulation hypothesis and time travel.

== Name ==
The novel is named after the Mare Tranquillitatis, a lunar mare. In the novel, the lunar mare is the site of the first extraterrestrial human colony.

== Plot ==
=== Edwin (1912) ===
In 1912, Edwin St. John St. Andrew, youngest grandson of an English earl, scandalizes his father at a dinner party by criticizing the British Raj, and is exiled to Canada as a remittance man. Passive in nature, Edwin drifts from Halifax west to Victoria, British Columbia. Beset by ennui because of Victoria's similarity to English high society, Edwin travels to Caiette, a fictional settlement (which also appeared in Mandel's previous novel The Glass Hotel) on the sparsely inhabited Vancouver Island. Venturing into a forest, Edwin suddenly finds himself within a vast, dark space, hearing a violin and other sounds he cannot recognize. The experience lasts only a few seconds. A stranger named Roberts, claiming to be a priest (but is in fact the same time traveler introduced later in the novel), questions him about this experience, but flees when Edwin becomes suspicious.

=== Mirella (2020) ===
In January 2020, years after Vincent Alkaitis's disappearance during the events of The Glass Hotel, her friend Mirella Kessler seeks her whereabouts and attends an audiovisual art performance by Vincent's brother, Paul Smith. Paul plays a childhood video filmed by Vincent in which, like Edwin, she is momentarily transported from a forest to a dark, train station-like space where a violin is heard. Mirella is devastated upon learning of Vincent's disappearance at sea. Then, as a man named Gaspery-Jacques Roberts (who accidentally betrays foreknowledge of the COVID-19 pandemic) questions her about the video, Mirella is disturbed to recognize him, seemingly not having aged, from a traumatic murder scene which she witnessed as a child in Ohio.

=== Olive (2203) ===
In 2203, novelist Olive Llewellyn, a native of a Moon colony, is away from her husband and daughter on a weeks-long Earthbound international book tour. She headlines numerous media events and lectures, promoting her breakthrough novel, Marienbad, about an imaginary influenza pandemic; all the while, reports of a string of real-world viral outbreaks escape her attention. Gaspery-Jacques, who shares the first name of a character in Marienbad, interviews Olive as a journalist, and questions her about a passage in Marienbad describing a character in a spaceport hearing a violin and being transported.

=== Gaspery-Jacques (2401) ===
Two centuries after Olive's time, Gaspery-Jacques (who was indeed named after the character she created) works an uneventful job as a hotel detective in another Moon colony. His prodigy sister, Zoey, who followed in their late mother's footsteps as a physicist, confides in him her research into Edwin, Vincent, and Olive's experiences of having swapped places, impossibly, across centuries. Zoey believes that this anomaly supports the simulation hypothesis, their mother's field of research, if it represents data corruption in the simulation.

Zoey admits that she works, under strict secrecy, at the Time Institute, a government agency wielding sole legal authority over time travel, which will officially investigate this anomaly. Impatient to escape his humdrum life, and despite warnings about the institute's ruthless bureaucracy, Gaspery-Jacques discovers a mutual friend at the Institute who eagerly recruits him to join the investigation. After years of training, Gaspery-Jacques travels to the past to interview each possible witness of the anomaly. Because he is officially briefed on each interviewee's life and ultimate fate, he is warned that deliberately changing the past, however well-intentioned, is punishable by being forcibly stranded in the past.

After uneventfully interviewing Alan Sami, an elderly man who played the violin in Oklahoma City Airship Terminal, Gaspery-Jacques interviews Olive, also learning little. Knowing that she is about to die during an imminent global pandemic, he defies protocols and warns her to return home immediately. Trusting his warning, Olive avoids her fate and safely reunites with her family as the pandemic erupts.

Zoey urges Gaspery-Jacques to go on the lam, but he persuades her to help him continue investigating the anomaly, incriminating herself as well. He witnesses the anomaly at the same time as Vincent, then travels to 1918 to accomplish his true goal: to personally assure Edwin of his sanity, saving him from being committed to an insane asylum. Returning to the Time Institute, Gaspery-Jacques is arrested alongside Zoey, but he does not regret his actions even upon learning that Edwin's ultimate death from the Spanish flu remains unchanged. Gaspery-Jacques's punishment is carried out by forced time-travel to 20th-century Ohio, where, at the murder scene that Mirella witnessed, he is framed and left to be arrested and sentenced to life in prison.

Years later, Zoey, who has joined another organization with time travel technology, saves a sixty-year-old Gaspery-Jacques from his incarceration, bringing him to safe lodging near Oklahoma City in 2172. To evade the Time Institute, he receives a new identity and facial surgery, becoming Alan Sami. He realizes that he himself will cause the anomaly by the meeting of his past and future selves at the spaceport. Decades later, having learned the violin and moved to Oklahoma City, Alan plays at the Airship Terminal on the destined day, seeing reality corrupt and repair itself as Edwin, Vincent, Olive, and his past selves all appear before him.

== Themes and influences ==
The character of Edwin is loosely based on one of Mandel's great-grandfathers.

Many reviewers (Ron Charles, Yvonne C. Garrett, Laird Hunt, Bethanne Patrick and Marcel Theroux) have remarked on the similarities between Olive and Mandel: Like Mandel's Station Eleven, Olive has written a book about a fictional pandemic before an actual pandemic happened. Laird Hunt calls Olive "unquestionably a stand-in for Mandel herself". Garrett has argued in her review of Sea of Tranquility, that Mandel − through the eyes of Olive − has detailed her own experience of the COVID-19 pandemic, which occurred during the writing of the novel. An example of this is a sentence detailing the human experience of the pandemic: "the panic, the lockdown, the constant sirens, technology exhaustion, the shifting and rethinking of personal and career priorities."

== Reception ==
=== Reviews ===
Yvonne C. Garrett has called Sea of Tranquility in The Brooklyn Rail "beautifully written" being an "equal parts vast and intimate, quiet and thrilling contemplation on humanity, physics, time, and what it means to be alive." In The Guardian, Marcel Theroux considered the work to be "hugely ambitious in scope, yet also intimate and written with a graceful and beguiling fluency". In his mind "the keynote of this book" was that "[s]omeone's world is always ending". Ron Charles sees Sea of Tranquility in The Washington Post as "science fiction that keeps its science largely in abeyance, as dark matter for a story about loneliness, grief and finding purpose." Laird Hunt argued in The New York Times that Sea of Tranquility is "one of [Mandel's] finest novels" and "one of her most satisfying forays into the arena of speculative fiction". Bethanne Patrick saw "a novel that is pure pleasure to read." In the Los Angeles Times she argued that Mandel is a superb stylist – "you see the strands and later the beautiful results, but your eyes simply cannot follow what comes in between."

Constance Grady, writing for Vox, reviewed the plot more critically. She argues that the "loveliness of Mandel's sentences [...] stands in jarring contrast to the clumsiness of her plotting." In her mind "[t]he different sections of this novel are linked by a time travel mystery, and the mystery's resolution [...] is so pat and clichéd that if [she] were to describe [...] the setup [...] [one] would know immediately how it all worked out." Writing in the Financial Times, Christian Lorentzen sees the work in a clearly negative light: He argued that "Sea of Tranquility is a book where every new element subtracts from the reader's experience. The characters are simplistic, the dialogue flat, and the descriptive passages exercise either in gauzy wonder at nature or dreary despair about the dehumanised technoscape. A book like Sea of Tranquility is a sign of a genre's exhaustion."

In the Washington Independent Review of Books, Andrea M. Pawley has remarked on the similarities between the novel and Last Year at Marienbad, a 1961 avant-garde French film, and stated that "the work informed St. John Mandel's writing of this novel".

=== Accolades ===
In 2022, the book was listed on Barack Obama's annual summer reading list and named as one of his favorite books of the year. The novel was longlisted for the 2023 Andrew Carnegie Medal for Excellence in Fiction. It was picked by Stephen Bush as one of the Financial Times critics’ picks for best books of 2022. Furthermore, it was one of Amazon's 20 Best Books of the Year for 2022.

The novel won the Goodreads Choice Awards for Best Science Fiction 2022.

== Planned adaptation ==
In April 2022, it was announced that HBO Max will adapt the novel and The Glass Hotel into television series, each produced by Paramount Television Studios with Mandel and Patrick Somerville co-writing. The project was shelved later that year.
