= Patrick Somerville =

American novelist and television writer

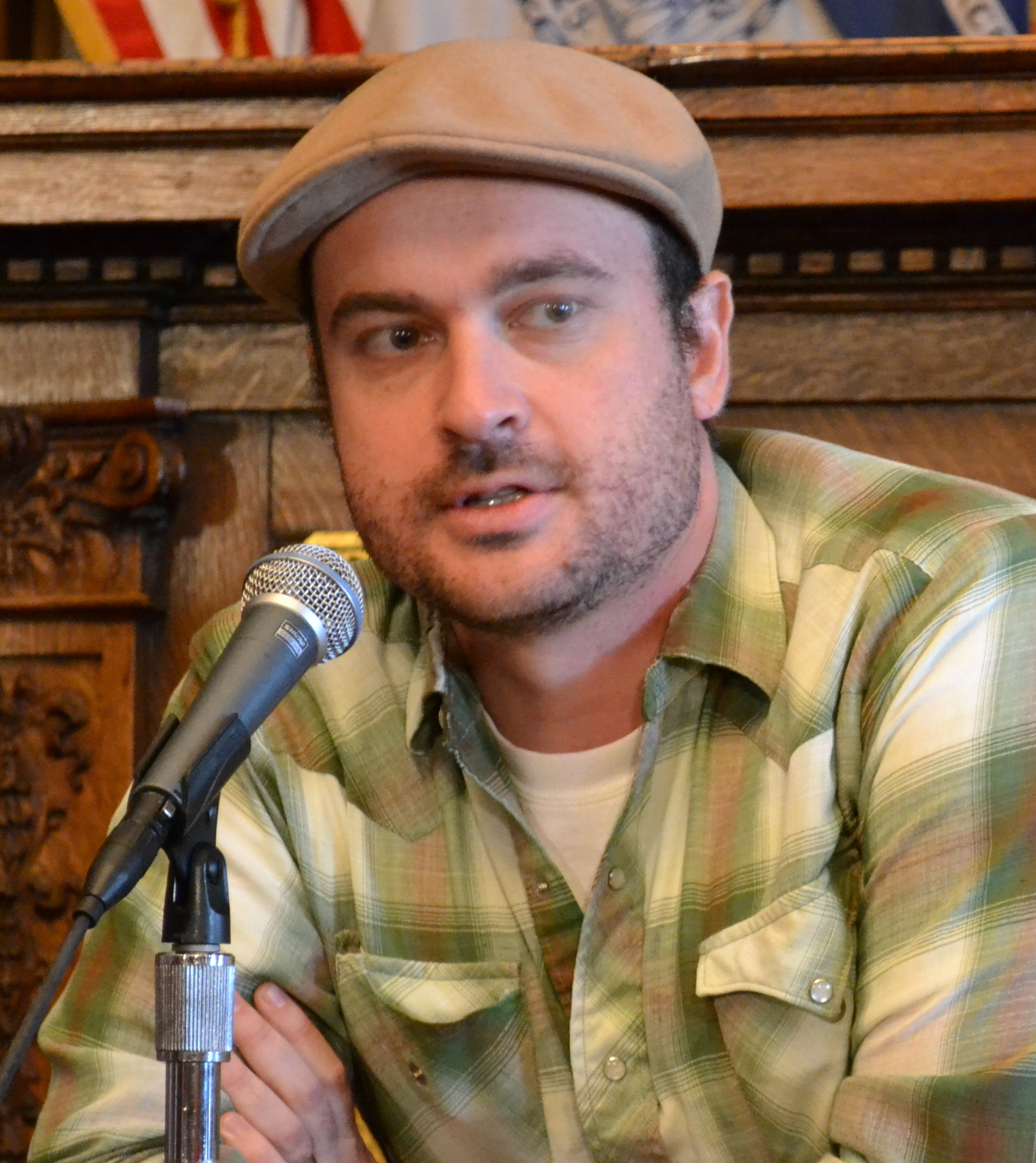
- Somerville at Brooklyn Book Festival, 2011
- Born: April 14, 1979 (age 47)
- Writing career
- Genre: novel

Patrick Somerville (born April 14, 1979) is an American novelist and television writer living in Chicago, Illinois, United States.

== Career ==
=== Novels ===
Somerville graduated from Cornell University in 2005. He published his debut novel, The Cradle, in 2009 and his second novel This Bright River in 2012.

=== Television ===
In 2013, Somerville joined the writing staff of The Bridge, where he wrote two episodes of the series. From 2015 to 2017, he was a writer on the HBO series The Leftovers. In October 2016, it was announced that Somerville would write the Netflix series Maniac. In December 2017, he signed a deal to develop new TV and digital projects exclusively for Paramount Television (now Paramount Television Studios). In October 2019, it was announced that he would be the writer and showrunner for a 10 episode HBO Max miniseries Station Eleven. He was also the showrunner for the first season of the series Made for Love.

In April 2022, it was announced that Somerville and Emily St. John Mandel would adapt The Glass Hotel and Sea of Tranquility as two Station Eleven followup series for HBO Max. However, later that year the projects were shelved due to ongoing upheaval at HBO and parent company Warner Brothers.

Amid fears in late 2022 that Station Eleven might be dropped by HBO from its streaming platform, Somerville promised to "purchase one acre of land somewhere in the Mojave desert and just play it on loop, projected on a rock, forever," a viewing experience described by Mandel as "optimal."

In July 2025, it was announced that Somerville would serve as showrunner for the Wolfenstein adaptation for Amazon Prime Video.

=== Film ===
Somerville is set to write and produce an original script, Ursa Major, directed by Jonathan and Josh Baker for XYZ Films. Mary Elizabeth Winstead and Xochitl Gomez are attached to star in the film.

== Publications ==
=== Novels ===
- The Cradle (2009)
- This Bright River (2012)

=== Short story collections ===
- Trouble: Stories (2006)
- The Universe in Miniature in Miniature (2010)

== Filmography ==
Year	Title	Credited as			Notes
Year	Title	Creator	Writer	Producer	Notes
2013–2014	The Bridge	No	Yes	No	4 episodes
2014	24: Live Another Day	No	Yes	No	2 episodes
2015–2017	The Leftovers	No	Yes	Yes	As writer (4 episodes); As co-producer (season 2); As supervising producer (season 3)
2018	Maniac	Yes	Yes	Executive	Miniseries (10 episodes)
2021–2022	Made for Love	Co-creator	Yes	Executive	Co-created with Alissa Nutting, Dean Bakopoulos and Christina Lee; As writer (3 episodes)
2021–2022	Station Eleven	Yes	Yes	Executive	Miniseries (10 episodes)
2025	Predator: Badlands	No	Yes	No	Credited for "additional literary material (not on-screen)"
TBA	Ursa Major	No	Yes	Yes	Pre-production
