= Made for Love =

Made for Love may refer to:

- Made for Love (film), a 1926 American silent drama film
- Made for Love (novel), a 2017 novel by Alissa Nutting
- Made for Love (TV series), an American television series, based on the novel
