= Alissa Nutting =

American author, professor (born 1980 or 1981)

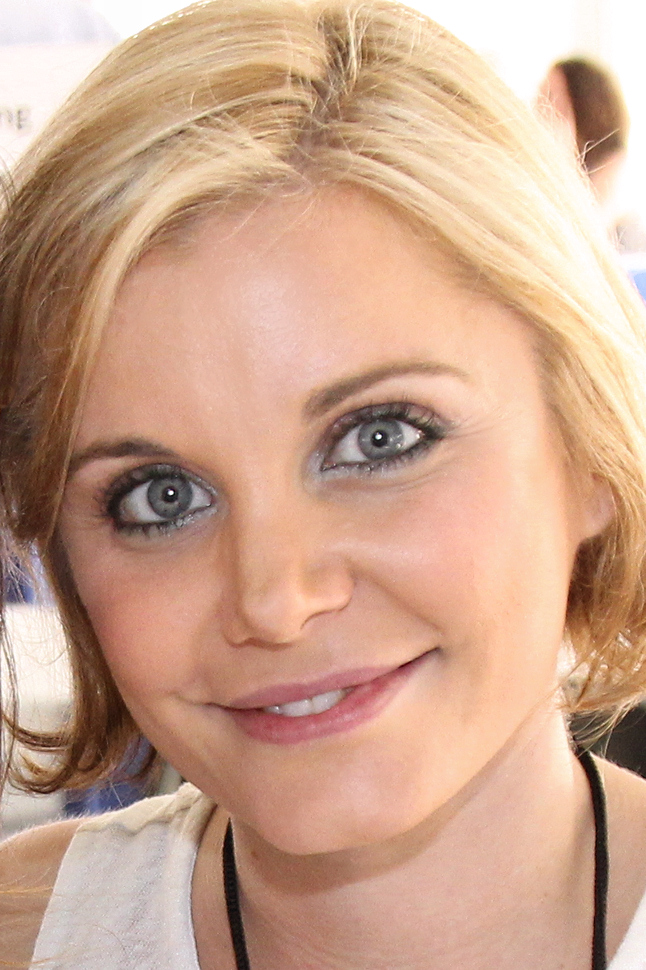
- Nutting at the 2017 Texas Book festival
- Born: Michigan
- Education: University of Florida; University of Alabama (MFA)
- Occupation: Writer
- Spouse(s): Shawn Nutting (divorced); Dean Bakopoulos (divorced)
- Children: 1
- Writing career
- Notable work: Tampa

Alissa Nutting (born 1980 or 1981) is an American author, creative writing professor and television writer. Her writing has appeared in Tin House, Fence, BOMB and the fairy tale anthology My Mother She Killed Me, My Father He Ate Me.

== Early career ==
Nutting attended Bloomingdale High School in Valrico, Florida. She received a bachelor's degree from the University of Florida and a Master of Fine Arts from the University of Alabama. At the University of Alabama, she served as editor of the Black Warrior Review. Nutting has taught creative writing at John Carroll University, the University of Nevada, Las Vegas, and Grinnell College.

== Writing ==
Nutting is author of the short story collection Unclean Jobs for Women and Girls. The book was selected by judge Ben Marcus as winner of the 6th Starcherone Prize for Innovative Fiction. The book, published by now-defunct Starcherone Books, was a 2010 ForeWord Book of the Year finalist, as well as an Eric Hoffer Montaigne Medal finalist for thought-provoking texts.

Tampa is a novel that combines erotica, satire and social criticism. It claims to address double standards like gender-based expectations of women, regarding beauty and the great extent of mischief for which women may be forgiven provided they are young and beauteous. The novel centres on a middle-school teacher who has sexual relations with her students. Nutting was inspired by Debra Lafave, a teacher charged with having sex with her under-age students in 2005. Nutting went to high school with Lafave; seeing someone she knew on the news raised her awareness of the issue of female predators. The book was banned in many bookstores for being too explicit.

When asked if it was difficult to come in and out of perspective with a deranged character Nutting replied: "It was like going under anesthesia—once I was inside it, I felt like I had to make the most of it because it was so difficult to go in and out. I ended up writing in really marathon sessions, 7–8 hours at a time. After I was done each day I had this hangover feeling—my body felt a grand fatigue even though I'd been seated the whole time. It took me a while to become verbal again after writing." She also explains how her publisher and editors understood that the content needed to be explicit and they didn’t ask her to tone it down.

She contributed to The &NOW Awards 2: The Best Innovative Writing (&NOW Books, May 2013).

Her writing has appeared in The Norton Introduction to Literature, Fence, Tin House, The New York Times, Bomb, Conduit, and O: The Oprah Magazine.

In her first television work, she co-created Made for Love with Dean Bakopoulos, Patrick Somerville and Christina Lee, based on her novel of the same name. The series premiered on HBO Max on April 1, 2021 and it was cancelled in July 2022 after two seasons following the merger of HBO Max's parent company WarnerMedia with Discovery, Inc. to become Warner Bros. Discovery.

Nutting would later go on to co-create Teenage Euthanasia with Alyson Levy for Adult Swim, which premiered on the network on September 6, 2021 and was renewed for a second season. The series was cancelled after two seasons.

In September 2025, Apple TV ordered the miniseries The Off Weeks created by Nutting, with Jessica Chastain and Ben Stiller starring as leads.

== Personal life ==
Nutting's first husband was Shawn Nutting, a tattoo artist. In 2013, Nutting gave birth to their daughter Sparrow Jane before the couple split up. Her second marriage was to novelist Dean Bakopoulos. It also ended in divorce. Following this, Nutting came out as gay.

== Bibliography ==
- Unclean Jobs for Women and Girls, Starcherone Books: Buffalo, New York. 2010. ISBN 978-0-984213320
- Tampa, Ecco. 2013. ISBN 978-0062280541
- Made for Love, Ecco, 2017 ISBN 978-0062280558

== Filmography ==
=== Film ===
- False Positive (2021; story)

=== Television ===
Year	Title	Creator	Writer	Executive Producer	Notes
2021–2022	Made for Love	Yes	Yes	Yes	Also acted as Trish (1 episode); based on her novel of the same name
2021–2023	Teenage Euthanasia	Yes	Yes	Yes	Various voice roles (6 episodes)
TBA	The Off Weeks †	Yes	Yes	Yes	Upcoming miniseries
