= Tampa (novel) =

2013 debut novel by Alissa Nutting

- First edition
- Author: Alissa Nutting
- Language: English
- Genre: Tragedy; Thriller
- Publisher: Ecco
- Publication date: 2 July 2013
- Publication place: United States
- Media type: Print (hardback and paperback)
- Pages: 336
- ISBN: 978-0062280541

Tampa is a thriller novel and the debut novel by author Alissa Nutting. Published in 2013, it follows middle school teacher Celeste Price, who grooms and molests one of her young male students.

== Plot ==
In Tampa, Florida, Celeste Price is a 26-year-old woman who is secretly a hebephile. Unhappy in her marriage with a wealthy police officer named Ford, she pursues a new career path where she will have easy access to young boys, specifically those of 14 years of age. The novel opens before her first day as an English teacher at Jefferson Junior High, where she plans to groom a student.

Celeste targets a shy student named Jack Patrick. She repeatedly directs classroom discussions toward sexual matters and begins to keep Jack after class to groom him.

Celeste discovers Jack's address and drives to his house to stalk him. She hides in her car and masturbates as she watches him doing mundane things through the windows. One night, she watches him masturbate in his bedroom. The next day, she keeps Jack after class and tells him what she saw, though claims she just happened to be in the area and accidentally came across his house. Jack is humiliated, but Celeste confesses her attraction to him and the two begin a relationship.

A week later, Celeste picks up Jack from his house under the pretense of working on a school project; that night, she molests Jack.

Later, Jack and Celeste begin meeting at his house while his divorcee father, Buck, is at work. Celeste lays out strict rules for their relationship, including that they may only communicate through a burner phone that she gives him. Things quickly become strained as Jack wants a more emotional relationship with her, while Celeste is only interested in him physically. He writes her poetry, asks her to tell him she loves him, and insinuates that they can be publicly together once he turns eighteen, a thought that revolts Celeste.

One day, Buck comes home earlier than expected and begins flirting with Celeste. Later, Jack suggests that Celeste seduce him so they can see each other more often. Celeste seduces Buck, but does not have sex with him. After Buck gives her a spare key, Celeste begins visiting Jack more frequently.

Before Jack leaves Tampa to visit his mother over Christmas break, he confides to Celeste that he feels threatened by his father's interest in her, which she downplays and finds humorous.

Before the start of the spring semester, Buck unexpectedly returns home early. To distract him, Celeste has sex with him, nearly vomiting during the encounter. Jack sees the pair having sex and runs off. Celeste is unable to say goodbye to Jack or explain what happened. Later that night, she is bombarded with calls from Jack, which she ignores.

Before class the next day, Celeste becomes increasingly paranoid that Buck was bribing Jack into manipulating her or that Jack killed him out of anger. Jack arrives angry at Celeste, believing that she wanted his father all along. Desperate to convince Jack that she is not interested in Buck, Celeste forces him into painful, unsatisfying anal sex. Afterward, Jack takes a photo of a nude Celeste, which is against her rules. Planning to take his phone to delete it later, she allows him to keep the photo.

Celeste and Jack continue their relationship, although Jack worries about being caught again, and Celeste is becoming unsatisfied. She proposes they drug Buck, to which Jack reluctantly agrees. Celeste spikes Buck's wine with the same drugs (Ambien) she uses to knock herself out during sex with her husband, and once he is unconscious, she drags him up to his bedroom where she then proceeds to molest Jack.

Returning home unexpectedly one day, Buck witnesses Celeste molesting Jack, the shock of it causing him a heart attack. Celeste watches him die idly, making no effort to help him. In Jack's room, Celeste asks him to fondle her breasts before informing him of his father's death, and a distraught Jack runs away from the room. Celeste tries and fails to find the nude photo of her on his phone. Once he returns, she performs oral sex on him and then instructs him to wait before calling emergency services. She leaves the scene, taking the burner phone with her.

After two weeks of truancy, Jack calls Celeste and asks her to visit him after school, which she reluctantly accepts. There, Jack reveals that once the school year ends, he will move in with his mother in Crystal Springs. Celeste molests him despite his despondency.

Over summer vacation, Jack occasionally visits, but Celeste is jaded by his emotional troubles and plans to end their relationship. Ford's new work schedule allows him to stay home more often, making it harder for Celeste to avoid him. She fantasizes about the new students to choose from in the upcoming school year.

When school starts again, Celeste sets her sights on a boy named Boyd Manning. Because he is not as shy as Jack, Celeste is concerned about his ability to be discreet, but her grooming of him progresses rapidly. Boyd's parents are married, so Celeste and Boyd primarily meet at Buck's vacant house for privacy. Celeste also continues her abuse of Jack, keeping both boys unaware of each other.

One night, while Celeste and Boyd are at Buck's house, Jack suddenly appears. He attacks Boyd, inflicting a severe wound on the other boy's head, before berating Celeste for abandoning him. When Jack flees, Celeste grabs a knife and runs after him, naked and covered in Boyd's blood. Police arrive and take Celeste in for questioning. Upon discovering the nude photo of her on Jack's SIM card, law enforcement begins to suspect she may have been abusing the boys. The interrogation is interrupted by an attorney hired by Ford's family. Celeste is told that she must publicly apologize to Ford for her infidelity, and is offered $15,000 if she weeps while doing so.

The case becomes a media circus, wherein Celeste plays the role of a young, innocent woman desperate for affection. At the trial, the defense argues that Celeste is too attractive to go to prison. One night during the trial, Ford arrives drunk at Celeste's cell to confront her, trying to make sense of their relationship, but she rebuffs him. Ford leaves in tears, never seeing her again.

Boyd and Jack are called to the stand at the trial the next day. Boyd delivers an over-eager testimony, making their relationship appear consensual. Jack tearfully answers questions while Celeste suppresses disgust at his appearance, which has matured during his six months in juvenile detention. The next day, the prosecution offers Celeste a plea bargain – she is placed on probation for four years, cannot go near a school or spend any unsupervised time with minors, and has to attend group therapy.

A year later, Celeste is given permission to move to a different town where she gets a job at a cabana bar under a fake name. Despite extensive therapy, she continues to assault teenage boys whose families visit the beach. To stay aroused by her memory of Jack and Boyd, she imagines that on the night Jack discovered her with Boyd, Boyd had died from his injuries, and she managed to kill Jack before the police arrived.

== Background ==
Tampa is the debut novel of Alissa Nutting, an essayist and creative writing professor whose first book was the 2010 short story collection Unclean Jobs for Women and Girls. Nutting was inspired by Debra Lafave, a Tampa teacher charged with raping one of her middle school students in 2005. Nutting went to high school with Lafave; seeing someone she knew on the news raised her awareness of the issue of female predators and changed her mind about the reality of underage male rape.

== Reception ==
The detail of sexual content gained mixed reactions from critics. Some bookstores declined to offer the novel for sale for being too explicit in its depiction of child sexual abuse by women.

In August 2016, filmmaker Harmony Korine stated that he was working on an adaptation of the novel. In September 2017, Korine confirmed a script had been finished, with no updates since.
