= Emily St. John Mandel =

Canadian writer (born 1979)

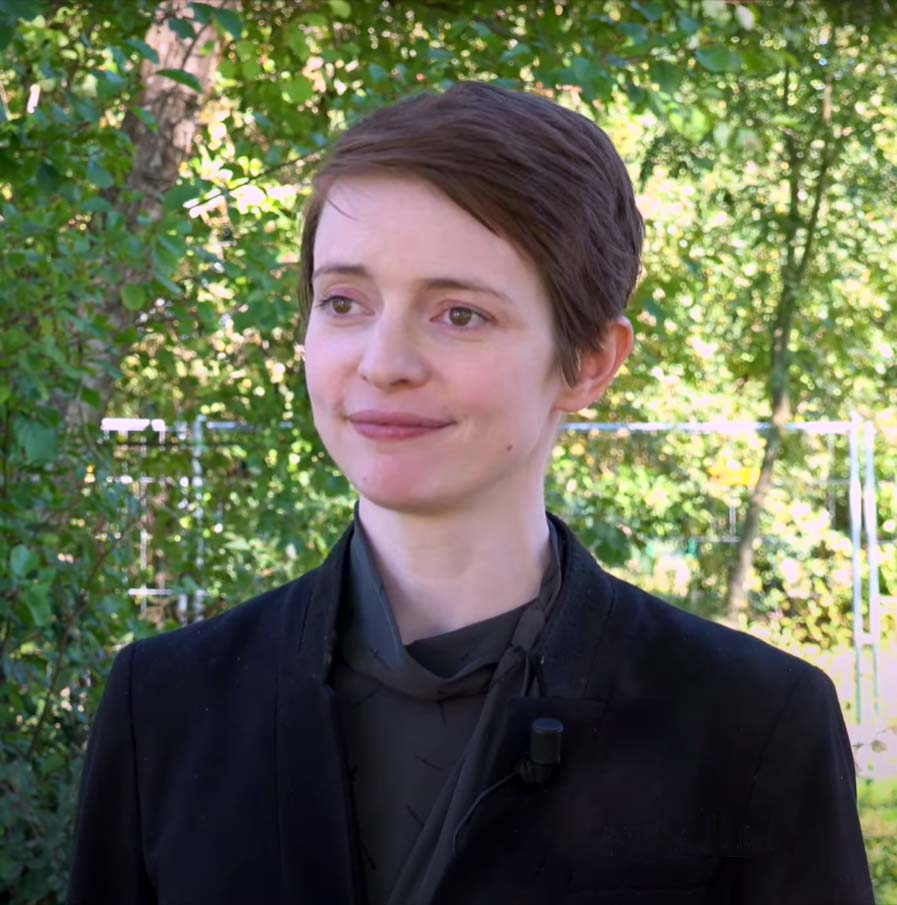
- Mandel in 2017
- Born: Emily St. John Fairbanks; 1979 (age 46–47); Merville, British Columbia, Canada
- Education: School of Toronto Dance Theatre
- Occupation: Author
- Spouses: Kevin Mandel (div. 2022); Laura Barisonzi (m. 2025)
- Children: 1
- Writing career
- Language: English
- Notable awards: Arthur C. Clarke Award
- Website: www.emilymandel.com

Emily St. John Mandel (/seɪntˈdʒɒn mænˈdɛl/; née Fairbanks; born 1979, is a Canadian novelist and essayist. She has written seven novels, including Station Eleven (2014), The Glass Hotel (2020), Sea of Tranquility (2022), and Exit Party (2026). Station Eleven, which has been translated into 33 languages, has been adapted into a limited series on HBO Max. The Glass Hotel was translated into twenty languages and was selected by Barack Obama as one of his favorite books of 2020. Sea of Tranquility was published in April 2022 and debuted at number three on The New York Times Best Seller list.

== Early life ==
Mandel was born in spring 1979 in Merville, British Columbia, Canada. Her Canadian mother is a social worker and her American father is a plumber. St. John, her grandmother's surname, is her middle name.

When she was ten years old, she moved with her parents and four siblings to Denman Island, which is 20 miles (32 km) south of Merville near Union Bay. She was home-schooled there until the age of fifteen, during which time she began keeping a daily diary. She left high school when she was eighteen to study contemporary dance at The School of Toronto Dance Theatre.

She worked with independent choreographers. She was also administrative assistant at a Manhattan architecture firm and helped with grants at the Anderson Center for Cancer Research at Rockefeller University.

== Career ==
In 2002, Mandel began writing her first novel, Last Night in Montreal, while living in Montreal. She is a staff writer for The Millions, an online magazine. In 2012, she used the Goodreads database to write an article for The Millions, analyzing statistics relating to novels with titles in "The ___'s Daughter" pattern. In 2016, she wrote a subsequent article, analyzing statistics relating to novels that included the word "girl" in the title. One of her findings was that the girl of the title is "significantly more likely to end up dead" if the author of the book is male.

=== Novels ===
Mandel's first three novels are Last Night in Montreal (2009), The Singer's Gun (2009), and The Lola Quartet (2012). Unbridled Books published all three novels.

Last Night in Montreal follows a young woman with a secret who cannot seem to settle in one city. When she is pursued by a private detective and a former lover, she is forced to come to terms with her own past and the secrets that haunt a childhood she cannot remember.

The Singer's Gun tells the story of Anton Waker, who grew up surrounded by corruption, but has now decided to live a more honourable life. His life unravels when his cousin blackmails him into doing one last job. As a result, his forged Harvard diploma is revealed, and his secretary disappears. Anton must choose between his loyalty to his family and his desire to live life with integrity.

The Lola Quartet is a literary noir novel that takes place in Florida following the 2008 financial crisis. Gavin, a recently fired journalist and former jazz musician, is contacted by his sister who believes she has discovered a daughter he never knew he had. Jobless, Gavin returns to his hometown and begins searching for his unknown child and the supposed mother—his high school girlfriend.

==== Station Eleven ====
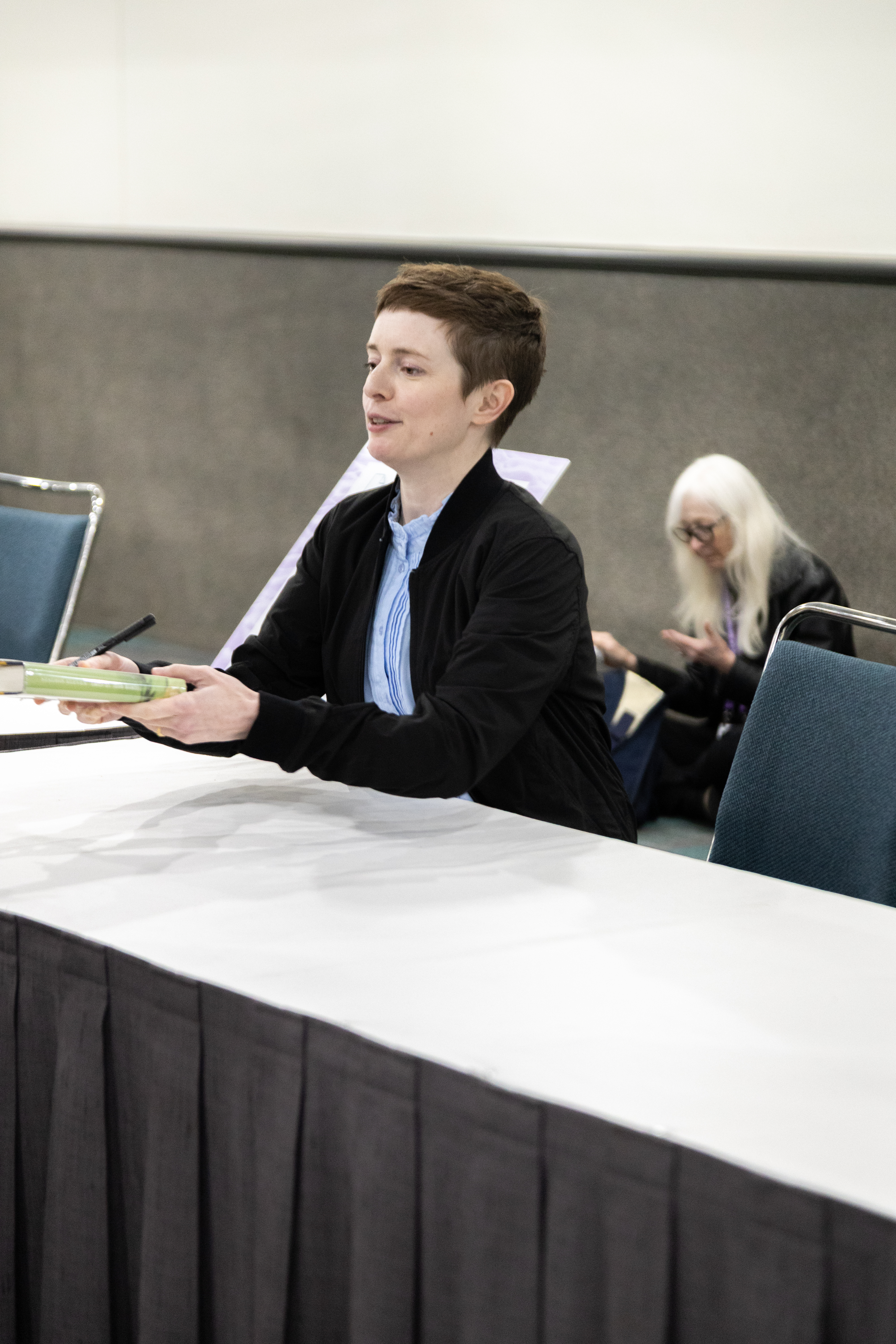
Mandel in 2025.

Mandel's fourth novel, Station Eleven (2014), is a post-apocalyptic novel set in the near future in a world ravaged by the effects of a virus and follows a troupe of Shakespearean actors who travel from town to town around the Great Lakes region. It was nominated for the National Book Award, the PEN/Faulkner Award for Fiction and the Baileys Women's Prize for Fiction, and won the Arthur C. Clarke Award and the Toronto Book Award. A film adaptation of the novel was developed by producer Scott Steindorff. The resulting ten-episode limited mini-series on HBO Max, Station Eleven, premiered on December 16, 2021.

Station Eleven was selected for the 2023 edition of Canada Reads, where it was championed by actor Michael Greyeyes. It was listed by The New York Times as one of the "100 Best Books of the 21st Century" in 2024.

==== The Glass Hotel ====
Her fifth novel, a mystery thriller titled The Glass Hotel, was shortlisted for the Giller Prize in 2020 and was recommended by Barack Obama when he released a list of his favourite books from 2020. In August 2019, NBCUniversal International Studios acquired the rights to The Glass Hotel for a television series adaptation, with producer Lark Productions. Mandel is writing the screenplay.

==== Sea of Tranquility ====
Mandel's sixth novel, Sea of Tranquility, was published in 2022. It is a work of speculative fiction and explores questions pertaining to time travel and the simulation hypothesis. It debuted at number 3 on The New York Times Best Seller list for "Combined Print & E-Book Fiction," and number 2 for "Hardcover Fiction." Barack Obama included the novel on his list of favourite books from 2022.

== Personal life ==
After studying dance, Mandel lived in Toronto and Montreal before relocating to New York City. She was married to Kevin Mandel, a writer and executive recruiter, with whom she has a daughter, born in 2015. They divorced in 2022.

In 2025, Mandel married Laura Barisonzi, a photographer and director, at the Greenlight Bookstore in Brooklyn, New York. As of 2026, she lives in Brooklyn, New York, and Echo Park, Los Angeles.

== Publications ==
=== Novels ===
- —— (2009). Last Night in Montreal. Unbridled Books. ISBN 9781932961683.
- —— (2010). The Singer's Gun. Unbridled Books. ISBN 9781936071647.
- —— (2012). The Lola Quartet. Unbridled Books. ISBN 9781609530808.
- —— (2014). Station Eleven. Knopf. ISBN 9780385353304.
- —— (2020). The Glass Hotel. Knopf. ISBN 9780525521143.
- —— (2022). Sea of Tranquility. Knopf. ISBN 9781529083491.
- —— (September 15, 2026). Exit Party. Knopf. ISBN 9780593321461.

=== Short stories ===
- —— (2011). "The Chameleon Machine". In Jeff Martin (ed.). The Late American Novel. W. W. Norton & Company. ISBN 9781593764043.
- —— (2012). "Drifter". In Maxim Jakubowski (ed.). Venice Noir. Akashic Books. ISBN 9781617750731.
- —— (2013). "Drifter". In Lisa Scottoline (ed.). The Best American Mystery Stories 2013. Houghton Mifflin Harcourt. ISBN 9780544319530.
- —— (2013). "Long Trains Leaving". In Sari Botton (ed.). Goodbye to All That: Writers on Loving and Leaving New York. Seal Press. ISBN 9781580054942.
- —— (2013). "The Violinist". In Jeff Martin (ed.). Imaginary Oklahoma. This Land Press. ISBN 9781480036291.
- —— (2017). "Mr. Thursday". In Preston Grassmann (ed.). Out of the Ruins. Titan Books. ISBN 9781789097399.

=== Essays ===
- "Emilie" in The Millions (April 19, 2010)
- "Nicholas Carr's The Shallows: What the Internet Is Doing to Our Brains" in The Millions (October 25, 2010)
- "On Bad Reviews" in The Millions (February 7, 2011)
- "The Second Life of Irmgard Keun" in The Millions (February 7, 2011)
- "Irène Némirovsky, Suite Française, and The Mirador" in The Millions (September 2, 2011)
- "The ___'s Daughter" in The Millions (March 28, 2012)
- "Eating Dirt: On Charlotte Gill and the Life of the Treeplanter" in The Millions (September 6, 2012)
- "Susanna Moore, Cheryl Strayed, and the Place Where the Writers Work" in The Millions (October 4, 2012)
- "Strange Long Dream: Justin Cronin's The Twelve" in The Millions (October 15, 2012)
- "Drinking at the End of the World: Lars Iver's Exodus" in The Millions (February 22, 2013)
- "I Await the Devil's Friend Request: On Social Media and Mary MacLane" in The Millions (March 29, 2013)
- "The Bulldozing Powers of Cheap" in The Millions (June 28, 2013)
- "Motherless Tacoma: On Eric Barnes's Something Pretty, Something Beautiful" in The Millions (July 11, 2013)
- "A Woman's Unraveling: On Suzanne Rindell's The Other Typist" in The Millions (July 31, 2013)
- "The Asking is Both Graceful and Profound: On the Stories of Josephine Rowe" in The Millions (August 8, 2013)
- "On the Pleasures and Solitudes of Quiet Books" in The Millions (August 27, 2013)
- "A Closed World: On By Grand Central Station I Sat Down and Wept" in The Millions (March 7, 2014)
- "You'll Probably Never Catch Ebola—So Why Is the Disease So Terrifying?" in The New Republic (August 12, 2014)
- "Susan Sontag, Essayist and So Much Else" in Humanities, 35:5 (September/October 2014)
- "The Land of Ice and Snow: On Lars Iyer's Wittgenstein Jr." in The Millions (November 24, 2014)
- "The Year of Numbered Rooms" in Humanities, 37:2 (Spring 2016)
- "The Gone Girl with the Dragon Tattoo on the Train" in FiveThirtyEight (October 2016)
- "A Year in Reading: Emily St. John Mandel" in The Millions (December 2, 2017)
- "Year in Reading: Emily St. John Mandel" in The Millions (December 23, 2018)

== Awards and nominations ==
- 2014: Prix Mystère de la Critique, Best Foreign Novel for The Singer's Gun
- 2014: finalist, National Book Award for Station Eleven
- 2015: Arthur C. Clarke Award for Station Eleven
- 2015: Toronto Book Award for Station Eleven
- 2015: finalist, PEN/Faulkner Award for Fiction for Station Eleven
- 2015: longlisted, Baileys Women's Prize for Fiction for Station Eleven
- 2017: Prix des Libraires du Québec, Novel Category Outside Quebec for Station Eleven
- 2020: shortlisted for Scotiabank Giller Prize for The Glass Hotel
- 2022: Goodreads Choice Awards, Best Science Fiction for Sea of Tranquility
