= Don't Come Back from the Moon =

- Film poster
- Directed by: Bruce Thierry Cheung
- Screenplay by: Bruce Thierry Cheung; Dean Bakopoulos
- Based on: Please Don’t Come Back from the Moon by Dean Bakopoulos
- Produced by: Jay Davis; James Franco; Lauren Hoekstra; Vince Jolivette
- Starring: Jeffrey Wahlberg; Alyssa Elle Steinacker; Rashida Jones; James Franco; Henry Hopper
- Cinematography: Chananun Chotrungroj
- Edited by: Joe Murphy
- Music by: Johnny Jewel
- Production companies: Elysium Bandini Studios; Kalamalka Productions
- Distributed by: Brainstorm Media
- Release dates: June 20, 2017 (LAFF); January 18, 2019 (United States)
- Running time: 98 minutes
- Country: United States
- Language: English

Don't Come Back from the Moon is a 2017 American independent drama film written and directed by Bruce Thierry Cheung. It is based on Dean Bakopoulos' 2005 novel, Please Don’t Come Back from the Moon. Filmed in Bombay Beach, CA, it stars Jeffrey Wahlberg, Alyssa Elle Steinacker, Rashida Jones, James Franco, and Henry Hopper.

The film premiered at the LA Film Festival on June 20, 2017, and was theatrically released in the United States on January 18, 2019.

== Plot ==
Sixteen-year-old Mickey Smalley lives with his mother Eva and little brother Kolya. Their father, Roman, has become the latest in a line of men to leave the town without a trace. As his mother slips into despair, Mickey and his friends wonder what has become of their fathers.

== Cast ==
- Jeffrey Wahlberg as Mickey Smalley
- Alyssa Elle Steinacker as Sonya Stecko
- Rashida Jones as Eva Smalley
- James Franco as Roman Smalley
- Henry Hopper as Ray
- Zackary Arthur as Kolya Smalley
- Hale Lytle as Nick
- Jeremiah Noe as Uncle John
- Cheyenne Haynes as Jodie
- Ambar Velazquez as Summer
- Anthony Ontiveros as Val
- Scott Crane as Budd Stecko

== Reception ==
On review aggregator Rotten Tomatoes, the film holds an approval rating of 88% based on 17 reviews, with an average rating of 6.90/10. Metacritic gives the film a weighted average score of 63 out of 100, based on 8 critics, indicating "generally favorable" reviews.

Joe Leydon of Variety called Don't Come Back from the Moon, "An artful and affecting mix of harshly defined specifics and impressionistic storytelling".

Rex Reed of The New York Observer called the film "very small, with a very big emotional force that unfolds through the eyes of 16-year-old [boy]", which is "sensitively played by promising newcomer Jeffrey Wahlberg".

Odie Henderson criticized the film's lack of importance, writing that "The Moon deserves better symbolism", while Sheri Linden of The Hollywood Reporter, praised the film for being "poignant and visually striking".

Writing for the Los Angeles Times, Robert Abele was quoted saying that "If Don't Come Back From the Moon isn't entirely successful, it means well as an engaged, considerate tour of a recognizably broken landscape".

According to Jeannette Catsoulis of The New York Times, "The [film's] emotional potency is undeniable, its slow crescendo of wounded feelings and shimmering photography leaving unexpected imprints on the eyes and heart".

== Accolades ==
- 2017 Woodstock Film Festival: Best Narrative Feature. Honorable Mention (win) – Bruce Thierry Cheung, Editing Award For Narrative Feature (win) – Joe Murphy
