= Jane Got a Gun =

2015 American action western film by Gavin O'Connor

- Theatrical release poster
- Directed by: Gavin O'Connor
- Screenplay by: Brian Duffield; Anthony Tambakis; Joel Edgerton
- Story by: Brian Duffield
- Produced by: Natalie Portman; Aleen Keshishian; Zack Schiller; Mary Regency Boies; Scott Steindorff; Scott LaStaiti; Terry Dougas
- Starring: Natalie Portman; Joel Edgerton; Noah Emmerich; Rodrigo Santoro; Boyd Holbrook; Ewan McGregor
- Cinematography: Mandy Walker
- Edited by: Alan Cody
- Music by: Lisa Gerrard; Marcello De Francisci
- Production companies: Boies/Schiller Film Group; Handsomecharlie Films; 1821 Pictures; Stone Village; WeatherVane Productions
- Distributed by: The Weinstein Company
- Release dates: December 31, 2015 (Germany); January 29, 2016 (United States)
- Running time: 98 minutes
- Country: United States
- Language: English
- Budget: $25 million
- Box office: $3.8 million

Jane Got a Gun is a 2015 American Western film directed by Gavin O'Connor and written by Brian Duffield, Joel Edgerton, and Anthony Tambakis. The film stars Natalie Portman, Joel Edgerton, Noah Emmerich, Rodrigo Santoro, Boyd Holbrook and Ewan McGregor.

After a long period of production issues since 2012, involving director and casting changes, principal photography began on March 21, 2013. The film was released on January 29, 2016.

The film was shown on October 12, 2017 at the 7th Almería Western Film Festival.

== Plot ==
Jane and her husband Bill "Ham" Hammond live in an isolated house with their five-year-old daughter Katie. One day, Ham returns home with several serious bullet wounds. As Jane is tending to his injuries, Ham tells her that the Bishop Boys, a group of criminals that Ham used to ride with, are coming for him.

Ham's injuries have rendered him helpless, so Jane takes her daughter to safety with a woman that she trusts. She then rides to the home of a neighbour and former fiancé, Dan Frost, and asks him to help her protect her family from the Bishop Boys. Dan, a surly man living in a squalid house, bitterly refuses.

Jane rides into town to buy guns and ammunition and find help. As she is leaving the shop, she is waylaid and dragged into an alley by one of the Bishop gang who threatens her at gunpoint. Jane claims that she has not seen Hammond in years, but the man recognizes the gun she is carrying as Ham's and demands that she take him back to her house. However, Dan Frost suddenly appears and tells the thug to leave Jane alone. Jane draws her gun and kills the outlaw.

Leaving the body in the alley, Jane and Dan ride back to her house. Ham is still alive, but very weak. Dan has changed his mind about helping Jane, so they start preparing for the expected attack from the Bishop gang.

Bishop sets out with his gang to find Ham. One of his men chances upon Jane's house and recognizes Jane, but Dan kills and buries him before he can raise an alarm. Dan digs a shallow trench in Jane's front yard, and they fill it with jars containing kerosene, nails and pieces of glass.

Flashbacks show that Jane and Dan were once engaged, but he enlisted in the army to fight in the American Civil War. Captured by the enemy, he was held for years in a prison camp, but when he finally returned home, Jane had left. He travelled from state to state trying to find her, showing her photograph in every town. Eventually, he heard that she had moved west on a wagon-train led by John Bishop. Dan talked to Bishop, who told him that, during the journey, Ham and Jane ran off together. He said that he would gladly help Dan to track them down, as he had his own scores to settle with Ham, but Dan refused, saying that he preferred to ride alone. Dan eventually found Jane, but by then, she was married to Ham and they had had a child. Heartbroken, Dan realized that he had lost her forever.

Later, Jane tells Dan her side of the story. After Dan left to enlist, she discovered that she was pregnant. When Dan did not return or write, she assumed that he was dead, and life in Jane's war-torn town had become so wretched that she decided to take her daughter Mary and move West on the Bishop wagon train. Too late, she and the other women on the wagon-train realized that Bishop intended to start a brothel, forcing the helpless women into prostitution.

Ham, having taken a fancy to Jane during the wagon-train journey, told Bishop that he wanted to marry her. But Bishop told Ham that Jane was his "property". Later, Ham found that Jane and her daughter had gone missing; searching for Mary, he saw a child's boot in the river and assumed that the child has drowned. He went to the brothel where Jane had been forced to work, killed some of Bishop's men, rescued her, and told her that Mary was dead.

Back in the present, the Bishop gang finally arrive at Jane's house under cover of darkness and riddle the house with bullets. Dan and Jane fire into the booby-trapped ditch, igniting the kerosene "bombs". Most of the gang are killed, but some – including Bishop himself – escape. Jane and Dan manage to move the dying Ham into a shallow storage space beneath the floor, to protect him from the gunfire, but the strain is too much for him and he dies. Dan and Jane continue to fight it out with the remaining gang members, although both are wounded. Finally, Bishop (the only gang member left alive) manages to corner Dan and is about to kill him, when Jane sneaks up behind Bishop and draws her gun on him. Trying to persuade her not to kill him, Bishop tells Jane that Mary is not dead, as she had thought. Jane shoots him several times, wounding him badly, until, in his agony, he reveals that Mary is at the brothel. Jane then kills Bishop.

Jane and Dan go to the brothel and find their daughter, Mary, who is working as a servant. Jane takes the bodies of Bishop and his gang to the sheriff and collects a huge reward. Then she, Dan, Mary and Katie ride off together to start a new life as a family.

== Cast ==
- Natalie Portman as Jane Hammond
- Joel Edgerton as Dan Frost
- Noah Emmerich as Bill "Ham" Hammond
- Rodrigo Santoro as Fitchum
- Boyd Holbrook as Vic Owen
- Ewan McGregor as John Bishop
- Alex Manette as Buck
- James Burnett as Cunny Charlie
- Sam Quinn as Slow Jeremiah

== Production ==
The original script was written by Brian Duffield. Duffield's script appeared on the 2011 edition of the Black List, an annual survey of the most popular unproduced screenplays by development executives.

In May 2012, it was announced that Natalie Portman would star in the film as the title character Jane Hammond and that Lynne Ramsay would direct. In August 2012, Michael Fassbender was reported as being in talks to play the role of Dan Frost, Jane's ex-lover. In December 2012, Joel Edgerton was cast as John Bishop, the villain of the film. On February 4, 2013, Rodrigo Santoro was announced to have joined the cast, playing a character named Fitchum. On March 11, 2013, it was revealed that Fassbender left the film due to scheduling conflicts with X-Men: Days of Future Past. Ramsay then recast Edgerton in the vacated role of Dan Frost and cast Jude Law in the role of John Bishop. On March 19, 2013, it was announced that Ramsay had left the production. On March 20, Gavin O'Connor was announced as her replacement. The same day, it was also announced that Law had left the film, for the reason that he had signed on to work with Ramsay.

Cinematographer Darius Khondji also left the production, and was replaced by Mandy Walker. Edgerton and Anthony Tambakis, co-screenwriter of O'Connor's previous film Warrior, were then hired to rewrite Duffield's script. On April 5, 2013, it was announced that Bradley Cooper would replace Law in the role of John Bishop. On April 10, 2013, it was announced that Noah Emmerich had been cast in the final lead role of Bill Hammond, Jane's husband. On May 1, 2013, it was announced that Cooper was withdrawing from the film. Cooper revealed that he was leaving because of scheduling conflicts with American Hustle. On May 6, 2013, Ewan McGregor was announced to take over the role of John Bishop from Cooper. On June 3, 2013, Boyd Holbrook was announced to be playing the younger brother of John Bishop.

== Release ==
=== Marketing ===
In January 2015, the first images from the film were released online. On October 5, 2015, the first international poster was released. On October 21, 2015 the first international trailer was released. On December 7, 2015, the second and final international trailer was released.

=== Distribution ===
Originally, the film was acquired for distribution in the United States at the Marché du Film by Relativity Media and The Weinstein Company, with Relativity handling theatrical distribution and TWC preparing marketing materials; CBS Films and Focus Features were among the studios interested in acquiring the film as well. The film was originally announced that it would be released on August 29, 2014, which the studio cancelled on April 10, 2014. On April 24, 2014, the studio set a release date for February 20, 2015 for the film, which was later moved back to September 4. In July 2015, Relativity Media filed for Chapter 11 bankruptcy; the film's producers barely managed to take back rights to the film prior to the filing. The Weinstein Company then re-acquired distribution rights in September that year. However, the film was then scheduled for a release sometime in February 2016, diminishing its makers' hopes for an awards-qualifying run. TWC nevertheless made efforts to heavily market the film for its European release in November 2015. Ultimately, the film was released in the United States on January 29, 2016.

== Reception ==
=== Box office ===
Jane Got a Gun was a box office bomb. It grossed $1.5 million in the United States and Canada and $2.3 million in other territories for a worldwide total of $3.8 million, plus $1.8 million with home video sales, against a production budget of $25 million. The film was released in North America on January 29, 2016, with a projected opening weekend gross around $1 million from 1,210 theaters. However, the film only grossed $865,572 with a per theater average of $691. It is the worst wide release opening for The Weinstein Company.

=== Critical response ===
On Rotten Tomatoes, the film has an approval rating of 42%, based on 85 reviews, with an average rating of 5.22/10. The site's consensus reads: "Jane Got a Gun flounders between campy Western and hard-hitting revisionist take on the genre, leaving Natalie Portman's committed performance stranded in the dust." On Metacritic the film has a score of 49 out of 100, based on 17 critics, indicating "mixed or average" reviews.

Joe Leydon of Variety called the film "a solidly-made and conventionally-satisfying Western," and wrote: "For those who have perused the countless accounts of last-minute cast changes, musical directors' chairs and repeatedly-delayed release dates, it may be difficult to objectively judge what actually appears on screen here without being distracted by thoughts of what could have been, or should have been." Michael Rechtshaffen of the Los Angeles Times wrote: "Jane Got A Gun may not have reinvented the wagon wheel, but it rolls out as a sturdy, well-crafted genre piece despite its rocky road to the screen."

Jordan Mintzer of The Hollywood Reporter wrote: "Filming on location in New Mexico, O'Connor and his team make strong use of the stark and sometimes-breathtaking exteriors, even if the drama is often confined to the Hammond homestead. Other tech contributions are solid, though this is a film whose production history may ultimately prove more memorable than what's been produced: In Jane Got a Gun, the real bullets were the ones fired behind the camera." Mintzer also said: "A handful of plot twists are not enough to compensate for an overtly heavy, often dreary affair that rides straight into the final standoff with little elegance and a wagon train of pathos." Chris Nashawaty of Entertainment Weekly wrote: "Since the film's last-minute rewrites, casting switcheroos, and musical chairs behind the camera are irrelevant to the actual quality of the movie, I'll avoid rehashing them here, save to say that the disarray shows on screen."

== See also ==
- Second weekend in box office performance § Second-weekend drop
