= Trevor Henderson =

Canadian horror artist (born 1986)

- Born: April 11, 1986 (age 40); Toronto, Ontario, Canada
- Education: OCAD University
- Occupations: Illustrator, creature concept designer, author
- Years active: 2010–present
- Known for: Faux found footage, digital horror art, internet cryptids
- Notable work: Siren Head, Cartoon Cat, Long Horse, Scarewaves

Trevor Henderson (born April 11, 1986) is a Canadian illustrator, concept designer, and writer who rose to fame in the late 2010s through his work on Instagram. He is best known for his creatures such as Siren Head, Cartoon Cat and Long Horse. He also wrote the teen horror duology Scarewaves, and in the fall of 2022, he created the horror podcast Mayfair Watchers Society, becoming its chief creative director and mastermind.

== Early life and education ==
Henderson was born in Toronto, Canada, on April 11, 1986. He currently resides in Toronto, where he actively pursues creative pursuits and posts his work on Instagram. Trevor Henderson graduated from the OCAD University.

His early work in 2012 was in the acid body horror style, from which he moved on to his own recognizable style. The artist's work is unique in its "Unnerving Images" style, which involves creating eerie creatures over real images. In interviews, Henderson has often spoken of his love for the Found footage genre, which creates the impression that what is shown on screen is actually happening in real life.

== Career ==
When he started his artistic journey in 2018, Henderson says he drew monsters every day using photos people sent him online. Until 2020, Henderson combined painting and working in retail. According to the artist, his last attempt was at a bookstore, which he left two months before the start of COVID-19 pandemic, to completely switch to freelancing.

In the early 2020s, Henderson began expanding his scope of work by incorporating freelance work. In the fall of 2022, he launched a horror anthology audio podcast called Mayfair Watchers Society in collaboration with the renowned horror network Bloody FM. The project is based entirely on the creatures and ideas of Henderson. As of 2026, over 70 episodes have aired, each featuring terrifying creatures in the fictional town of Mayfair.

In late 2023, he wrote the first installment of a young adult horror book series, Scarewaves, which was entirely written and illustrated by the artist. On August 5, 2025, Henderson released a sequel, Scarewaves: Beyond the Grave. Henderson has illustrated over 20 horror books. Henderson's illustration work has garnered recognition in leading national media outlets; in 2024, The New York Times singled out his artwork for the horror novella Stay on the Line.

== Examples of characters ==
=== Siren Head ===
One of Henderson's most recognizable characters, Siren Head, was created in August 19, 2018. Siren Head is a 40ft (12m) tall humanoid monster, with its body consisting of rusted metal and mummified skin. It has two functioning metal sirens in place of a head with wires attached to its neck, with some depictions having human like jaws and teeth, and a snake-like tongue within the sirens. Siren Head is known to be very dangerous, it is an apex predator that uses sound to attract prey. Its sirens often blare garbled music, Emergency Alert System broadcasts, and people speaking or screaming for help. Siren Head can also mimic the voices of people in order to lure prey. Siren Head also is believed to be very powerful due to its size, and can move silently but with immense speed. It is spotted in remote areas, the woods, and suburban towns. Often blending in with the environment to trick prey. The creature's main concept was a cryptid embodying the numbers station phenomenon, which was of great interest to the artist at the time. The monster first appeared on Instagram on August 19, 2018. Henderson himself, recalling the first few days after its publication, noted: "It got a couple of likes. People were like, 'This design is really cool,' and then nothing happened for six months".

The character was first noticed at the end of 2018, when an acquaintance of Henderson, Modus Interactive, asked for permission to create a small video game featuring Siren Head. The game and character soon went viral in 2020, as video bloggers on YouTube like, Markiplier played the game. In April 2020, a CGI video made by VFX TikToker Alex Howard of a giant Siren Head towering over a city went viral on social media. Writers of PC Gamer and the Daily Dot compared the character to Slender Man. The character also became the subject of Internet memes, as fan art, and animations went viral. The character is remembered as one of the most popular horror characters created on the internet.

In 2020, the idea of including the creature in SCP Foundation canon was also actively promoted, but Henderson responded to this proposal: "I really like it. There’s a lot of great stuff there. But once something gets put on the SCP Foundation website, it becomes Creative Commons licensed. So, in a sense, it becomes public domain. So, trying to spread misinformation about Siren Head [being part of the SCP project] is kind of a way of taking this character away from its creator".

In 2026, it was announced that a film adaption based on the character was in development at Warner Bros., with Zach Cregger and Brian Duffield writing, with the latter also directing, and Henderson serving as Executive Producer.

=== Cartoon Cat ===
Cartoon Cat first appeared on Henderson's Instagram in August 4, 2018, as a rubber hose style cartoon with large eyes, a toothy grin, a cat-like head. and long limbs. Cartoon Cat is an ancient hollow rot that uses the collective human awareness and memories of old cartoons as a passageway to manifest into reality and wreak violent havoc. It is depicted in abandoned places such as malls. Its body is entirely malleable, as it is able to stretch, bend, and contort its body. Cartoon Cat also has the ability to shape shift, warp reality, and has cartoon physics. It is known to be incredibly sadistic, as it toys with its victims before killing them. While the character didn't get nearly as popular as Siren Head, it still became a viral internet meme in 2020, and became one of the most popular internet horror characters.

On July 13, 2026, it was announced that a film adaption based on the character was in development at Sony's TriStar Pictures, marking Henderson's second feature deal after Siren Head.

=== Long Horse ===
Long Horse first appeared on a post on Trevor Henderson’s instagram on August 24th, 2018, with the caption saying “I had that nightmare again, about the horse on the stairs.” Long Horse appears to be a horse’s skull lacking a lower jaw, connected to a seemingly infinite neck, making it look like it’s levitating. Long Horse possesses the abilities to predict disasters and teleport, and makes decisions with benevolence, as it uses these abilities to warn others.
