= The Glass Hotel =

2020 novel by Emily St. John Mandel

- Cover of first edition
- Author: Emily St. John Mandel
- Audio read by: Dylan Moore
- Language: English
- Set in: Canada; United States
- Publisher: HarperCollins
- Publication date: 24 March 2020
- Publication place: Canada
- Media type: Print (hardback and paperback)
- Pages: 320
- ISBN: 9781443455725 (hardback)
- OCLC: 1128887395
- Dewey Decimal: 813/.6
- LC Class: PR9199.4.M3347 G53 2020
- Website: www.emilymandel.com/glasshotel.html

The Glass Hotel is a 2020 novel by Canadian writer Emily St. John Mandel. It is Mandel's fifth novel, and the first since winning the Arthur C. Clarke Award with her novel Station Eleven in 2015. It follows the aftermath of a disturbing graffiti incident at a hotel on Vancouver Island and the collapse of an international Ponzi scheme.

== Plot summary ==
Paul is a lonely student at the University of Toronto. At a nightclub, he gives some tablets to band members he was hoping to befriend and one of them dies shortly after. Paul flees to the apartment of his half-sister Vincent.

Five years later, Paul and Vincent work at a hotel on the northernmost tip of Vancouver Island in the fictional Caiette, which is based on the real hamlet Quatsino. Graffiti is discovered written on a window in the lobby with an acid marker, saying, "Why don't you swallow broken glass." Paul is immediately suspected and leaves before being fired. The graffiti would appear to be intended for Jonathan Alkaitis, a wealthy investor who owns the hotel. Vincent, who is working the bar, soon enters a relationship with Alkaitis (pretending to be his wife) and moves into his house in Connecticut. Her life becomes one of extreme wealth and accommodating her partner.

Alkaitis is arrested and it is revealed that his investment success is a Ponzi scheme. His complicit staff reacts in different ways to their impending demise. One flees the country, another writes an elaborate confession. Alkaitis is sentenced to 170 years in prison, where he dreams of a "counter-life" in which he escaped to a hotel in Dubai. He is often haunted by the people he defrauded.

After the collapse of the scheme, Vincent discovers that Paul has taken old videotapes of hers as the basis for musical compositions. Refusing to confront him, she takes a job as a cook on a shipping freighter. She disappears from the ship in the midst of a storm. Her onboard boyfriend is suspected of killing her. Leon Prevant, who lost his life savings investing with Alkaitis, is sent to help investigate. His co-investigator instructs him to cover up possibly incriminating evidence from an interview.

Paul finds some success as a composer. He has a long-term heroin addiction.

In an epilogue, it is revealed Vincent fell from the ship after becoming distracted by a vision of one of Alkaitis' investors. As she drowns, she experiences a series of apparent hallucinations (some of which have been referenced by other characters earlier in the book) of Alkaitis, Paul, and finally her mother, who disappeared herself when Vincent was a small child.

== Inspiration ==
Jonathan Alkaitis's Ponzi scheme is based on the crimes of Bernie Madoff. Mandel said, "I do want to be clear about this book: it's not about any real people. It's not about Madoff — or Madoff's family or Madoff's actual staff — but the crime is the same. That was my starting point. The thing that fascinated me the most was the staff involved. I found myself thinking, 'Who are these people who show up at work every morning to perpetuate a massive crime?'"

As with Station Eleven (2014), Mandel is inspired by the "invisible world" of shipping and the "ghost fleet" of freighters off the shore of Malaysia after the 2008 financial crisis. The Glass Hotel includes a reference to the "Georgia flu," the illness which drove the plot of Station Eleven. However, in this novel, the illness never became a pandemic. Two characters from Station Eleven (shipping consultants Miranda and Leon) also appear in The Glass Hotel.

== Television series ==
In April 2022, it was announced that HBO Max will be adapting the novel into a television series, produced by Paramount Television Studios with Mandel and Patrick Somerville co-writing. However, the project was shelved as Mandel moved on to work on her new novel Exit Party which features some of her characters from The Glass Hotel and another one of her books The Singer's Gun.

== Reception ==
The Atlantic said, "The Glass Hotel is a jigsaw puzzle missing its box. At the book's start, what exactly it is about or even who the major figures are is unclear. The structure is virtuosic, as the fragments of the story coalesce by the end of the narrative into a richly satisfying shape. There are wonderful moments of lyricism." The New Yorker said, "Mandel's gift is to weave realism out of extremity. She plants her flag where the ordinary and the astonishing meet, where everyday people pause to wonder how, exactly, it came to this. She is our bard of waking up in the wrong timeline."

NPR said, "In Vincent and Paul, Mandel has created two of the most memorable characters in recent American [sic] fiction. The two are both haunted by longing and self-doubt, trying in vain to run away from their respective demons." Seth Mandel at The Washington Examiner agreed, "Mandel's characters are crisply drawn, all sharp lines and living color. Everyone in the book is witty; no one is particularly likable. But taken together, their overlapping stories are gripping."

Former President of the United States Barack Obama included the book on his list of favorite books of 2020.

== Awards and nominations ==
- Shortlist, 2020 Giller Prize
- Longlist, 2021 Andrew Carnegie Medal for Excellence in Fiction
