= Dean Bakopoulos =

American writer (born 1975)

- Born: 1975 (age 50–51); Dearborn Heights, Michigan, U.S.
- Education: University of Michigan (BA); University of Wisconsin–Madison (MFA)
- Occupation: Writer
- Spouse: Alissa Nutting (m. 2015) Divorced

Dean Bakopoulos (born 1975 in Dearborn Heights, Michigan) is an American writer. He is a two-time National Endowment for the Arts fellow, a Guggenheim Fellow, and a tenured professor and chair of the Cinematic Arts department at the University of Iowa. Bakopoulos has a B.A. from the University of Michigan and an M.F.A. degree from the University of Wisconsin-Madison. He is also a faculty member in the Warren Wilson College MFA Program for Writers.

== Life and career ==
Please Don't Come Back from the Moon (2005) was his debut novel, about fathers in Maple Rock, Detroit abandoning their families under a strange compulsion to go to the Moon. It is narrated by the young Mikey, a would-be writer, whose father feels the same desire to leave. The New York Times said it "deftly weld[ed] magic realism with social satire". Entertainment Weekly gave it a B− saying it turned into a very conventional coming-of-age story. People gave it 3.5/4.

In 2017, James Franco's Rabbit Bandini films released a film version of the novel, entitled Don't Come Back from the Moon, starring Franco, Rashida Jones, and Jeffrey Wahlberg. Bruce Thierry Cheung directed the film version, which was co-written by Bakopoulos.

My American Unhappiness (2011), his second novel, is narrated by Zeke Pappas, a young man compiling an inventory of American unhappiness for a struggling non-profit organization. The New York Times found Bakopoulos charming but the book too frivolous and arch. The Los Angeles Times found that some of the characters were one-dimensional, there only to advance the plot, but found the satire was pleasantly combined with warmth and affection for its subjects.

Summerlong, his third novel, was published by Ecco in June 2015. It was named a "best book" of 2017 by National Public Radio, which praised its sadly funny vibe, saying, "this book nails the entropy of adulthood."

An Apple TV series based on Bakopoulos's original solo spec pilot, The Off Weeks is currently filming in New York, with Ben Stiller and Jessica Chastain attached to star. Bakopoulos is co-creator and executive producer of the series. In addition, a TV adaptation of his short story "The Dog" is now in development at Film Nation, with Bakopoulos attached to showrun and executive produce.

== Personal life ==
Bakopoulos has two children from his first marriage. In September 2015 he married Alissa Nutting. They created Made For Love, a television series based on Nutting's novel Made For Love, which premiered on HBO Max in 2021 and starred Cristin Milioti, Ray Romano, and Noma Dumezweni. They divorced after the show's second season.

== Bibliography ==
- Please Don't Come Back from the Moon, Harcourt (2005)
- My American Unhappiness, Houghton Mifflin Harcourt (2011)
- Summerlong, Ecco Press (June, 2015)
