= The Off Weeks =

Upcoming American drama miniseries

- Genre: Drama
- Created by: Alissa Nutting; Dean Bakopoulos
- Showrunner: Alissa Nutting
- Starring: Jessica Chastain; Ben Stiller; Arian Moayed; Annaleigh Ashford; John Cho; Richard Gere
- Country of origin: United States
- Original language: English

Production
- Executive producers: Alissa Nutting; Michael Showalter; Jessica Chastain; Ben Stiller; Dean Bakopoulos; Paul Lee; Gabriel Fisher; John Lesher; Kelly Carmichael; Jordana Mollick; Peter Principato; Allen Fischer; Brian Steinberg
- Production companies: Apple Studios; wiip; Artists First; Semi-Formal Productions; Freckle Films; Red Hour Films

Original release
- Network: Apple TV

The Off Weeks is an upcoming American drama television miniseries created by Alissa Nutting and Dean Bakopoulos for Apple TV, starring Jessica Chastain and Ben Stiller. The project originated with an original, semi-autobiographical pilot script from Bakopoulos.

== Premise ==
When divorce throws writing professor Gus Adler's life into chaos, he struggles to hold things together during "on weeks" when he has custody of his kids. But in his "off weeks", he's falling dangerously in love with Stella West, a mysterious woman whose arrival puts Gus' on-week duties and off-week ambitions on a fatal collision course.

== Cast ==
=== Main ===
- Jessica Chastain as Stella West
- Ben Stiller as Gus Adler
- Arian Moayed as Angelo
- Annaleigh Ashford as Jade
- Richard Gere as Jonathan
- John Cho

=== Recurring ===
- Zoë Winters as Jenny Adler
- Ravi Patel as Drew
- Will Yun Lee as Willy
- Tony Macht as Kel
- Tom Francis

== Production ==
It was announced in September 2025 that Apple TV has greenlit the series from creators Alissa Nutting and Dean Bakopoulos, with Michael Showalter set to serve as director. Jessica Chastain and Ben Stiller were cast to star. Richard Gere, Arian Moayed, Annaleigh Ashford would be announced to join the cast throughout January 2026. In February, John Cho, Zoë Winters, Ravi Patel, Will Yun Lee and Tony Macht were cast in recurring roles. Tom Francis joined the cast in May. The cast also includes Harlow Jane.

Scenes for the series were shot in New Rochelle, New York in late February 2026. Production also occurred at the Mediapro Studios in Westchester, New York.

Production officially wrapped in May 2026.
