= Exit Party =

2026 novel by Emily St. John Mandel

- Author: Emily St. John Mandel
- Language: English
- Genre: Dystopian
- Publisher: Alfred A. Knopf
- Publication date: 15 September 2026
- Publication place: United States
- ISBN: 9780593321461
- OCLC: 1559989165

Exit Party is a 2026 dystopian novel by Canadian author Emily St. John Mandel, inspired by a shelved adaptation of one of her books, The Glass Hotel (2020). The novel takes place in Los Angeles and Paris in the aftermath of the collapse of the United States, and an alternate reality where the country is an oppressive one-party state. The novel includes characters from other books by Mandel, including The Singer's Gun and The Glass Hotel.

== Premise ==
In the year 2031, where a coup and subsequent civil war have broken the United States apart into new republics and volatile territories controlled by warring militias, Ari Waker and her roommate attend a party where the host, Kareem, vanishes into thin air. Waker soon discovers that an apparent double of Kareem's girlfriend, Gloria, has appeared in her world, and knew a version of Waker in her own. The novel follows multiple interlocking characters and timelines across two versions of the U.S., all seemingly connected by a painting, Swan Dive.

== Reception ==
The New York Times gave Exit Party a positive review, noting it would "rightly entrance new readers while gripping Mandel’s existing ones." Publishers Weekly said in a starred review that Exit Party was a bracing commentary on the dangers of divisiveness and surveillance, adding the propulsive plot is fuelled by the unfolding mystery of the opening party scene. Kirkus Reviews said the book was a thrilling read and a virtuoso demonstration of the moral and philosophical possibilities of speculative fiction. Booklist and BookPage awarded it starred reviews while both The Book Reporter and The Arts Desk also raved about the novel.

== Television adaptation ==
Mandel's earlier novel, Station Eleven, was adapted into an acclaimed miniseries by HBO, and in October 2025, a bidding war began for the rights to Exit Party, with WandaVision writer Jac Schaeffer attached as showrunner alongside Mandel. In March 2026, Portland animation company Laika Studios, under its live-action division LAIKA Live-Action, purchased the television rights with Emma Stone and Dave McCary's company Fruit Tree executive producing.
