= Station Eleven (miniseries) =

2021 American dystopian fiction miniseries

- Genre: Drama; Dystopian fiction; Post-apocalyptic
- Created by: Patrick Somerville
- Based on: Station Eleven by Emily St. John Mandel
- Starring: Mackenzie Davis; Himesh Patel; Matilda Lawler; David Wilmot; Nabhaan Rizwan; Daniel Zovatto; Philippine Velge; Lori Petty
- Music by: Dan Romer
- Country of origin: United States
- Original language: English
- No. of episodes: 10

Production
- Executive producers: Patrick Somerville; Jessica Rhoades; Scott Steindorff; Dylan Russell; Scott Delman; Jeremy Podeswa; Hiro Murai; Nate Matteson
- Producers: Emily St. John Mandel; Claire Welland; David Eisenberg; Stephanie Jacob-Goldman
- Production locations: Chicago; Toronto; Mississauga
- Cinematography: Christian Sprenger; Steve Cosens; Daniel Grant
- Editors: Issac Hagy; Karoliina Tuovinen; Kyle Reiter; Anna Hauger; Yoni Reiss; David Eisenberg; Anthony McAfee
- Running time: 44–59 minutes
- Production companies: Super Frog; Pacesetter Productions; Stone Village Television; Shadowfox Productions; Tractor Beam; Paramount Television Studios

Original release
- Network: HBO Max
- Release: December 16, 2021 – January 13, 2022

Station Eleven is an American post-apocalyptic dystopian fiction television miniseries created by Patrick Somerville loosely based on the 2014 novel of the same name by Emily St. John Mandel. The miniseries premiered on HBO Max on December 16, 2021, and ran for ten episodes until January 13, 2022.

It received critical acclaim and was nominated for seven Primetime Emmy Awards, including Outstanding Lead Actor in a Limited or Anthology Series or Movie for Himesh Patel.

== Premise ==
Twenty years after a flu pandemic resulted in the collapse of civilization, a group of survivors who make their living as traveling performers encounter a violent cult led by a man whose past is unknowingly linked to a member of the troupe.

== Cast ==
=== Main ===
- Mackenzie Davis as Kirsten Raymonde, a young woman who is now the star actress with the Traveling Symphony
  - Matilda Lawler as young Kirsten, an eight year old stage actress at the onset of the pandemic who was starring in a production of King Lear with Arthur Leander
- Himesh Patel as Jeevan Chaudhary, an audience member the night of the pandemic who takes care of the young Kirsten
- David Wilmot as Clark Thompson, Arthur Leander's former best friend who now leads an isolated compound at the Severn City airport
- Nabhaan Rizwan as Frank Chaudhary, Jeevan's brother, a writer who became a recluse after an injury left him disabled
- Daniel Zovatto as Tyler Leander, the son of Arthur and Elizabeth. He leads a group of rogue children.
  - Julian Obradors as young Tyler
- Philippine Velge as Alexandra, a younger member of the Traveling Symphony
- Lori Petty as Sarah, the co-founder of the Traveling Symphony

=== Recurring ===
- Gael García Bernal as Arthur Leander, a famous actor who dies on stage the night the pandemic began, formerly married to Miranda and Elizabeth, father to Tyler
- Danielle Deadwyler as Miranda Carroll, Arthur's first wife and the author of the graphic novel Station Eleven
- Caitlin FitzGerald as Elizabeth, Arthur's second wife and Tyler's mother, who became a famous actress in German cinema
- Andy McQueen as Sayid, a member of the Traveling Symphony
- David Cross as Gil, a founder of the Traveling Symphony and Sarah's former partner
- Enrico Colantoni as Brian, Elizabeth's associate and an agent for the Museum of Civilization
- Deborah Cox as Wendy, a member of the Traveling Symphony
- Luca Villacis as Cody
- Prince Amponsah as August, a member of the Traveling Symphony
- Dylan Taylor as Dan
- Joe Pingue as Dieter, a member of the Traveling Symphony
- Maxwell McCabe-Lokos as Vlad
- Ajahnis Charley as Chrysanthemum
- Milton Barnes as Miles, an employee at the Severn City airport who forms a romantic relationship with Clark
- Kate Moyer as Haley Butterscotch
- Sarah Orenstein as Katrina, Gil's wife and the woman he left Sarah for
- Timothy Simons as Jim, Miranda's coworker

== Episodes ==
| No. | Title | Directed by | Written by | Original release date |
|---|---|---|---|---|
| 1 | "Wheel of Fire" | Hiro Murai | Patrick Somerville | December 16, 2021 |
In December 2020, famous actor Arthur Leander dies on stage during a Chicago production of King Lear. Audience member Jeevan Chaudhary, who attempts to help despite his inexperience, accompanies abandoned child actor Kirsten Raymonde home. On the way, Jeevan receives a call from his doctor sister Siya warning that a deadly virus has come from Europe into America. Unable to contact Kirsten's parents at her home, Jeevan and Kirsten are forced to buy several grocery carts' worth of food and barricade themselves inside the apartment of Jeevan's brother Frank, a writer. From his windows, they watch a plane fall from the sky and crash. Eighty days later, Jeevan and Kirsten leave the apartment to a snowy wasteland filled with abandoned cars, humanity having been decimated by the flu pandemic. Twenty years later, adult Kirsten rehearses a play while reading a copy of a graphic novel called Station Eleven that had once been given to Arthur Leander. The title of this episode comes from a line from King Lear, Act IV Scene 7: "But I am bound upon a wheel of fire, / That mine own tears do scald like molten lead."
| 2 | "A Hawk from a Handsaw" | Jeremy Podeswa | Patrick Somerville | December 16, 2021 |
Two years after the outbreak of the virus, a lone Kirsten comes across a composer named Sarah who leads and performs for the Traveling Symphony, a nomadic group of actors and musicians who perform William Shakespeare plays on a defined tour path called the "Wheel"; Sarah invites Kirsten to join. Kirsten grows up to become the Symphony's star actress. Arriving at Lake Michigan, Kirsten and fellow actor Alex, who was born after the pandemic, meet a suspicious man, David, and supposedly his teenage son Cody. They lie about their origins and David quotes Station Eleven, which Kirsten believes only she has read due to her having the only copy. Kirsten also finds hook-shaped symbols in the woods that reference Station Eleven's illustrations, and becomes wary; Alex, however, sympathizes with the two. The Symphony puts on Hamlet, during which Kirsten flashes back to the outset of the virus, when she, Jeevan, and Frank learn her parents are deceased via text message. After the play, an emissary from a secret community called the Museum of Civilization approaches Sarah to perform there, but she refuses to stray from the Wheel. Kirsten confronts David about the book, and after he threatens that the Symphony members will "disappear" if they don't give him refuge, she stabs him; he goes on to reference a prophecy and further quotes from Station Eleven. The next morning, Kirsten finds that Cody has taken David and fled, the latter having survived and painted the hook symbol with his blood. The title of this episode comes from a line from Hamlet, Act II Scene 2: "I am but mad north-north-west. When the wind is southerly, I know a hawk from a handsaw."
| 3 | "Hurricane" | Hiro Murai | Shannon Houston | December 16, 2021 |
In the past, Arthur meets and spends time with Miranda, the author of Station Eleven who works in logistics. In 2007, they are married and living together but clash because of media attention and their different approaches: Arthur is often away but Miranda is often absent, and Miranda is unwilling to dedicate herself to her art. Arthur shows her unfinished graphic novel to costar Elizabeth, and Miranda leaves him after setting the pool house and her graphic novel on fire. In 2020, Miranda visits Arthur to deliver a published copy of the graphic novel and gives him two copies, an additional one for his son Tyler. She agrees to meet him after she returns from her work trip. Miranda attempts to flee her work trip in Malaysia as the virus spreads, but then she is told by mutual friend Clark Thompson that Arthur died on stage that night. Out of grief, she stumbles and irretrievably drops the keys she needs to escape. The logistics of her exit plan broken, Miranda is forced to stay in Malaysia. She attempts a futile secondary plan of taping up her hotel room vents and doors. As she dies, she hallucinates being visited by the astronaut protagonist, Dr. Eleven, from her graphic novel come to life.
| 4 | "Rosencrantz and Guildenstern Aren't Dead" | Helen Shaver | Nick Cuse | December 23, 2021 |
One year after the pandemic sets in, Jeevan and Kirsten are living alone in a cabin. One day, Station Eleven goes missing, resulting in an argument between the two. Jeevan eventually leaves to go find it, but Kirsten finds it outside the next morning and Jeevan nowhere to be found. In the present, Kirsten warns Alex to be wary of outsiders such as David, but Alex rebuffs her and claims that anyone born before the pandemic is unnecessarily cautious. After again rebuffing the man from the Museum of Civilization, the Symphony comes upon a fork in the road. The Symphony used to split the group between musicians and actors to travel to a performance town and a country club called Pingtree respectively, but stopped the practice when Sarah's ex-husband and the Symphony's former director, Gil, settled down with his new wife in Pingtree; they now run a community of professors. While preparing to head to the performance town, Alex finds a note that reads "beware of the Prophet" (David), who runs a cult of children by preying on their naivete to claim there was never a pandemic and abducting them from various towns. Alex shows this to Kirsten, who reveals she hid Station Eleven in Pingtree. In order to check in on the book, Kirsten tricks Sarah into splitting the Symphony to visit Pingtree. When they arrive, they discover the Prophet has already taken all the children of their community. In order to alleviate the professors' pain, Sarah decides to perform a modern adaptation of Hamlet for them, with Alex in her first leading role. While the Symphony rehearses, Kirsten recovers Station Eleven, which she had hidden in Gil's office. Meeting with Gil, Kirsten requests he rejoin the Symphony, but he refuses. The play is a success, but Alex leaves on horseback after a fight with Kirsten, which mirrors the fight Kirsten had with Jeevan. As Kirsten prepares to look for her, she encounters one of the children, who is wearing a mine that Gil set after the Prophet's attack as an explosive belt. Kirsten chases the child, who joins another child that is meeting with Gil. While quoting Station Eleven, the two children hug Gil, setting off the mines and killing all three of them, though Kirsten survives the blast. The title of this episode comes from characters from Hamlet, as longtime friends Arthur and Clark refer to themselves as Rosencrantz and Guildenstern, and from the play, Rosencrantz and Guildenstern Are Dead.
| 5 | "The Severn City Airport" | Lucy Tcherniak | Cord Jefferson | December 23, 2021 |
At the outset of the pandemic, Clark is stuck at Severn City Airport with Elizabeth, Arthur's second wife; and Tyler, Arthur and Elizabeth's moody child. Clark rallies the people inside the airport, who set up a settlement complete with solar panels and gardens, while a plane full of travellers is left stranded on the tarmac after potential exposure to the virus. Elizabeth gives Tyler a copy of Station Eleven that Arthur sent and lies to him that Arthur also sent him many letters that she destroyed out of jealousy. Tyler finds a survivor on the plane who might have natural immunity, but the community is paranoid of infection, and in the chaos, security guard Miles shoots the survivor. Tyler and Elizabeth are forced to quarantine for a month due to exposure to the survivor, during which Tyler obsessively reads Station Eleven. Clark begins to build the Museum of Civilization. Tyler sets the plane on the tarmac aflame, faking his death. Tyler is revealed to be the Prophet.
| 6 | "Survival Is Insufficient" | Helen Shaver | Sarah McCarron | December 30, 2021 |
Kirsten sets off in search of Alex, who has disappeared after the attack orchestrated by The Prophet. Alex is discovered to have returned to Pingtree with the group, but Kirsten decides to go after the Prophet alone as she feels responsible for the deadly attack on Gil and the death threats against the entire Traveling Symphony. It is revealed that young Kirsten finally decided to put away Station Eleven in order to care for baby Alex. Under pressure, Sarah agrees to take the group to the Museum of Civilization to perform when she learns the other half of their group has been brought there. Upon arrival at the airport, which has running electricity, Sarah has a heart attack. In the woods, Kirsten meets with the Prophet, who is wounded, and his group of children (or "post-pans," born after the pandemic) who welcome her to their group. The Prophet convinces Kirsten that the Symphony is in danger from the Museum of Civilization and she agrees to help him gain access to the community at Severn City Airport. On their journey, Kirsten and the group are attacked by the Red Bandanas, a violent group.
| 7 | "Goodbye My Damaged Home" | Lucy Tcherniak | Kim Steele | December 30, 2021 |
Kirsten fights off all the Bandanas, protecting the Prophet and the other children, but Cody dies and she is poisoned. Delirious, Kirsten revisits memories from her younger self, remembering her time with Jeevan in his brother Frank's apartment at the beginning of the virus outbreak. Prior to their arrival, Frank dumps his stash of heroin after Siya calls him. Jeevan later finds his drug paraphernalia, which leads to an argument between them. Frank and Kirsten bond over Station Eleven, while Jeevan worries about survival and hallucinating, calls out to Siya for guidance. As their food supply dwindles, Jeevan wants to leave the apartment, but Frank refuses, believing Jeevan cannot survive supporting both him and Kirsten due to his hip injury. Before they leave, Kirsten has them put on her play adaptation of Station Eleven. During the performance, an intruder arrives to take over the apartment, but Frank refuses to leave his home. The intruder kills Frank and Jeevan kills the intruder. Jeevan and Kirsten head east, and adult Kirsten says goodbye to Frank.
| 8 | "Who's There?" | Helen Shaver | Patrick Somerville and Sarah McCarron | January 6, 2022 |
Kirsten and the Prophet continue on their way to Severn City Airport, where the rest of the Traveling Symphony are being held in quarantine prior to their performance. After Miles finds the duo out in the woods, Clark welcomes Kirsten and the Prophet to the airport community, but has them perform a scene from a play to prove they are actors. The duo improvise a sequence from Station Eleven. Afterwards, Kirsten reunites with the Traveling Symphony, but is devastated to learn Sarah has suffered a heart attack and no one has seen her since. Kirsten discovers the Prophet's connection to the Museum of Civilization and the Station Eleven graphic novel. The Prophet is reunited with Clark and Elizabeth, but refuses to acknowledge them as he sets fire to the Museum of Civilization. Sarah makes Kirsten promise to not tell the troupe of her death until after the play. Prior to the outbreak, Arthur takes the sober Clark on a bender. They fight over their divergent paths in life, Clark having failed at acting and turned to business, and over Miranda. The next morning, Clark insults Arthur's parenting before realizing Tyler and Elizabeth were there. The title of this episode references the first line of Hamlet: "Who's there?"
| 9 | "Dr. Chaudhary" | Jeremy Podeswa | Will Weggel and Patrick Somerville | January 6, 2022 |
Almost a year after the outset of the virus, Kirsten and Jeevan seek refuge in a lakeside cabin during winter. Kirsten is often distracted reading Station Eleven. Jeevan argues that they need to find more people, while Kirsten is mad that Jeevan made them leave Frank's apartment. Jeevan finds a radio and lies to a stranger that he is a doctor. While searching houses for supplies, Kirsten is reading and lets Jeevan get attacked by the stranger; he escapes, and tosses Kirsten's graphic novel as they head back. That night Kirsten finds out and the two have an argument. Jeevan goes out at night to retrieve the graphic novel only to be attacked by a wolf. Waking up to a mangled foot, he passes out just meters from the cabin and is found by the stranger, Lara, who had continued searching for him. Jeevan is forced to recover from his foot amputation amongst a group of pregnant women – synchronized by conception during the first days of virus power outages. Their only doctor, Terry, is overwhelmed by the pending births. Jeevan is devastated to learn that Kirsten has disappeared, but stays at the makeshift birth center (a big-box store) and handles some of the near simultaneous births, earning the name "Doctor". In the present, Jeevan lives with Lara and their children at a lakeside cabin. Jeevan leaves for a medical house call.
| 10 | "Unbroken Circle" | Jeremy Podeswa | Patrick Somerville | January 13, 2022 |
At the outset of the virus outbreak, Miranda asks Clark to care for Elizabeth and Tyler. Before her death, she calls the pilot of the plane arriving from Chicago and convinces him to keep all passengers on board when arriving at Severn City Airport to protect those inside. In the present, Kirsten and the Traveling Symphony are freed from their quarantine to perform a play for the community at the airport. Jeevan also arrives at the airport to tend to Clark's burn injuries after the museum fire and sits with Sarah as she peacefully passes away. The Traveling Symphony performs Hamlet. Kirsten reveals, to Elizabeth and Clark, her connection to Arthur. Elizabeth and Clark agree to let Tyler perform as Hamlet, while they will play Gertrude and Claudius, with Kirsten directing. During the play, Tyler pulls a knife on Clark, who says he loved Arthur, too. Tyler forgives Clark and Elizabeth. One of The Prophet's children suddenly appears at the airport wearing a land mine, and Kirsten shows her the Station Eleven graphic novel to show her it was only a story. Jeevan finally reunites with Kirsten. Elizabeth and Tyler peacefully leave the airport with hundreds of children, including Alex, who makes up with Kirsten. Jeevan and Kirsten go their separate ways but promise to reunite next year at the airport, which Kirsten adds to the Wheel.

== Production ==
=== Development ===
In February 2015, producer Scott Steindorff acquired the TV and film rights to the novel. The series was ordered by the streaming service HBO Max on June 25, 2019, and created by Patrick Somerville, with Hiro Murai attached as a director. Both were executive producers, alongside Scott Delman, Dylan Russell, Scott Steindorff, Jessica Rhoades, Jeremy Podeswa, and Nate Matteson. The miniseries premiered on December 16, 2021. Podeswa, Helen Shaver, and Lucy Tcherniak also directed episodes.

=== Differences from novel ===
Somerville made several major changes from the original novel's plot, such as creating a more significant relationship between Jeevan and Kirsten, and giving Tyler the Prophet a less villainous presence and a redemptive arc. In addition, the Canadian setting of the majority of the novel is replaced with an American setting. Though much of the Year Zero setting in the original novel is St. John-Mandel's native Toronto, Somerville moved the action to his own native Chicago. Ironically, due to the COVID-19 pandemic, shooting was moved from Chicago to Mississauga, a city bordering Toronto.

=== Casting ===
In October 2019, Mackenzie Davis, Himesh Patel and David Wilmot were cast to star in the series. Matilda Lawler would be added in November 2019. In January 2020, Gael García Bernal was cast in a recurring role. In February 2020, Danielle Deadwyler joined the cast in a recurring capacity. Nabhaan Rizwan and Philippine Velge would join as series leads in March 2020. In April 2021, Daniel Zovatto and Lori Petty joined the cast in lead roles, while Andy McQueen, David Cross, Enrico Colantoni, Julian Obradors, and Deborah Cox joined the cast in recurring roles. Luca Villacis, Prince Amponsah, Dylan Taylor, Joe Pingue, Maxwell McCabe-Lokos, Ajahnis Charley, Milton Barnes and Kate Moyer joined the cast in recurring capacities in June 2021.

=== Filming ===
Filming began in Chicago in January 2020. Due to the COVID-19 pandemic, production moved to Mississauga on February 1, 2021, and concluded on July 9, 2021.

== Release ==
The first three episodes premiered on HBO Max on December 16, 2021.

=== Home media ===
The miniseries was released on 4K Ultra HD Blu-ray, Blu-ray, and DVD on February 21, 2023, by Paramount Home Entertainment.

== Reception ==
On Rotten Tomatoes, it has a 98% approval rating based on 57 reviews. The website's critics consensus reads, "Station Eleven rewards patient viewers with an insightful and thematically rich assertion that—even in the post-apocalypse—the show must go on." On the review aggregator Metacritic, the series has a weighted average score of 81 out of 100 based on 27 critics, indicating "universal acclaim".

Jen Chaney, in Vulture, writes of the show's theme: "Text from Miranda’s comic, which was passed on to young Kirsten in the early days of the pandemic, echoes throughout the episodes as though its verses are biblical. 'I remember damage' is a line uttered more than once; 'I don’t want to live the wrong life and then die' is another... a reflection of how fiction and art can feel as though they’ve been tailored specifically to the present and the contours of one’s own private heart. ... Music, theater, and literature can provide both an escape from our circumstances and a way of processing them that becomes forever intertwined with those circumstances."

=== Accolades ===
| Year | Ceremony | Category | Recipient(s) | Result | Ref. |
|---|---|---|---|---|---|
| 2022 | Critics' Choice Super Awards | Best Science Fiction/Fantasy Series | Station Eleven | Won | |
| 2022 | Critics' Choice Super Awards | Best Actress in a Science Fiction/Fantasy Series | Mackenzie Davis | Won | |
| 2022 | Directors Guild of America Awards | Outstanding Directorial Achievement in Movies for Television and Limited Series | Hiro Murai (for "Wheel of Fire") | Nominated | |
| 2022 | GLAAD Media Awards | Outstanding Limited or Anthology Series | Station Eleven | Nominated | |
| 2022 | Gotham Independent Film Awards | Breakthrough Series – Long Form | Station Eleven | Nominated | |
| 2022 | Gotham Independent Film Awards | Outstanding Performance in a New Series | Matilda Lawler | Nominated | |
| 2022 | Hollywood Critics Association TV Awards | Best Streaming Limited or Anthology Series | Station Eleven | Nominated | |
| 2022 | Hollywood Critics Association TV Awards | Best Directing in a Streaming Limited or Anthology Series | Hiro Murai (for "Wheel of Fire") | Nominated | |
| 2022 | Hollywood Critics Association TV Awards | Best Writing in a Streaming Limited or Anthology Series | Patrick Somerville (for "Unbroken Circle") | Nominated | |
| 2022 | Location Managers Guild Awards | Outstanding Locations in Limited Anthology Television | Srdjan Vilotijevic, Elmer Jones, Stefan Nikolov, Stuart Berberich | Won | |
| 2022 | Peabody Awards | Entertainment | Station Eleven | Nominated | |
| 2022 | Primetime Emmy Awards | Outstanding Lead Actor in a Limited or Anthology Series or Movie | Himesh Patel | Nominated | |
| 2022 | Primetime Emmy Awards | Outstanding Directing for a Limited or Anthology Series or Movie | Hiro Murai (for "Wheel of Fire") | Nominated | |
| 2022 | Primetime Emmy Awards | Outstanding Writing for a Limited or Anthology Series or Movie | Patrick Somerville (for "Unbroken Circle") | Nominated | |
| 2022 | Primetime Creative Arts Emmy Awards | Outstanding Cinematography for a Limited or Anthology Series or Movie | Christian Sprenger (for "Wheel of Fire") | Nominated | |
| 2022 | Primetime Creative Arts Emmy Awards | Outstanding Music Composition for a Limited or Anthology Series, Movie or Special | Dan Romer (for "Unbroken Circle") | Nominated | |
| 2022 | Primetime Creative Arts Emmy Awards | Outstanding Single-Camera Picture Editing for a Limited or Anthology Series or Movie | David Eisenberg, Anna Hauger, Anthony McAfee, and Yoni Reiss (for "Unbroken Circle") | Nominated | |
| 2022 | Primetime Creative Arts Emmy Awards | Outstanding Sound Editing for a Limited or Anthology Series, Movie or Special | Bradley North, Tiffany S. Griffith, Chuck Michael, Matt Manselle, Matt Telsey, Lodge Worster, and Brian Straub (for "Wheel of Fire") | Nominated | |
| 2022 | Television Critics Association Awards | Outstanding Achievement in Movies, Miniseries and Specials | Station Eleven | Nominated | |
| 2022 | USC Scripter Awards | Best Television Adaptation | Patrick Somerville (for "Wheel of Fire"); Based on the novel by Emily St. John Mandel | Nominated | |
| 2023 | Art Directors Guild Awards | Excellence in Production Design for a Television Movie or Limited Series | Ruth Ammon | Nominated | |
| 2023 | Critics' Choice Awards | Best Limited Series | Station Eleven | Nominated | |
| 2023 | Directors Guild of America Awards | Outstanding Directorial Achievement in Limited Series or Movies for Television | Jeremy Podeswa (for "Unbroken Circle") | Nominated | |
| 2023 | Directors Guild of America Awards | Outstanding Directorial Achievement in Limited Series or Movies for Television | Helen Shaver (for "Who's There?") | Won | |
| 2023 | Independent Spirit Awards | Best New Scripted Series | Patrick Somerville, Jessica Rhoades, Scott Steindorff, Dylan Russell, Scott Delman, Jeremy Podeswa, Hiro Murai, Nate Matteson, David Nicksay, Nick Cuse | Nominated | |
| 2023 | Independent Spirit Awards | Best Lead Performance in a New Scripted Series | Himesh Patel | Nominated | |
| 2023 | Independent Spirit Awards | Best Supporting Performance in a New Scripted Series | Danielle Deadwyler | Nominated | |
