= Unclean Jobs for Women and Girls =

Book by Alissa Nutting

- Author: Alissa Nutting
- Cover artist: Catrin Welz-Stein
- Language: English
- Genre: Fiction
- Published: October 1, 2010 (Starcherone Books)
- Publication place: United States
- Pages: 188
- Awards: Starcherone Prize for Innovative Fiction
- ISBN: 9780984213320
- OCLC: 794493974

Unclean Jobs for Women and Girls is the debut short story collection of author Alissa Nutting, winner of the Sixth Starcherone Prize for Innovative Fiction. The book was a ForeWord Book of the Year finalist, as well as an Eric Hoffer Montaigne Medal finalist for thought-provoking texts.

Unclean Jobs for Women and Girls, which was first published by Starcherone Books in October 2010 and reprinted in August 2011 by the same publisher, features eighteen dark but humorous short stories that investigates the world of women and girls and their jobs in contemporary society. American novelist Lydia Millet said about the book: "[Alissa] Nutting's outrageous writing makes my face split with laughter ... She's glorious chaos and utterly original."

== Sources ==
- Nutting, Alissa (October 1, 2010). Unclean Jobs for Women and Girls. Buffalo, NY: Starcherone Books. ISBN 9780984213351. OCLC 794493974.
  - All editions and formats at WorldCat.
