= Made for Love (TV series) =

2021 American TV series

- Official poster
- Genre: Dark comedy; Comedy drama; Science fiction; Tragicomedy
- Created by: Alissa Nutting & Dean Bakopoulos and Patrick Somerville and Christina Lee
- Based on: Made for Love by Alissa Nutting
- Showrunners: Patrick Somerville; Alissa Nutting; Christina Lee
- Starring: Cristin Milioti; Billy Magnussen; Dan Bakkedahl; Noma Dumezweni; Ray Romano; Augusto Aguilera; Caleb Foote; Sarunas J. Jackson
- Music by: Keefus Ciancia
- Country of origin: United States
- Original language: English
- No. of seasons: 2
- No. of episodes: 16

Production
- Executive producers: Christina Lee; Alissa Nutting; Patrick Somerville; Dean Bakopoulos; Liza Chasin; SJ Clarkson; Daisy Mayer
- Producers: Janet Knutsen; Cristin Milioti; Andres Anglade
- Cinematography: Nathaniel Goodman; Brandon Mastrippolito
- Editors: Andy Morrish; Al LeVine; Anthony McAfee
- Running time: 25–29 minutes
- Production companies: Ghost Moon; 3dot Productions; Paramount Television Studios

Original release
- Network: HBO Max
- Release: April 1, 2021 – May 19, 2022

Made for Love is an American science fiction dark comedy-drama television series based on the 2017 novel of the same name by creator Alissa Nutting. The series premiered on HBO Max on April 1, 2021. It stars Cristin Milioti, Billy Magnussen and Ray Romano. In June 2021, the series was renewed for a second season which premiered on April 28, 2022. Despite positive response to the series, in June 2022, the series was canceled after two seasons following the merger of HBO Max's parent company WarnerMedia with Discovery, Inc. to become Warner Bros. Discovery. It was removed from HBO Max in December 2022.

== Premise ==
After a woman escapes from a suffocating 10-year marriage to a tech billionaire, she discovers her husband had her fitted with a tracking device. The device, which he implanted in her brain, allows him to track her location, watch her live, and know her "emotional data" as she tries to regain her independence.

== Cast ==
=== Main ===
- Cristin Milioti as Hazel Green
- Billy Magnussen as Byron Gogol
- Dan Bakkedahl as Herringbone
- Noma Dumezweni as Dr Fiffany Hodeck
- Ray Romano as Herbert Green
- Augusto Aguilera as the Liver (season 1)
- Caleb Foote as Bennett Hobbes (season 2; recurring season 1)
- Sarunas J. Jackson as Jay / Jasper (season 2; guest starring season 1)

=== Recurring ===
- Patti Harrison as Bangles de la Morga
- Kym Whitley as Judiff
- Dutch Johnson as Bruce
- Raymond Lee as Keefus / Jeff (season 2)
- Angela Lin as Dr. Hau (season 2)
- Ashley Madekwe as Zelda (season 2)
- Chris Diamantopoulos as Agent Hank Walsh (season 2)
- Travis Van Winkle as Aaron Benson (season 2)
- James Urbaniak as Gogol interviewer (season 2)
- Paula Abdul as Anydoors (season 2)

== Production ==
=== Development ===
Made for Love is an adaptation of the novel of the same name by Alissa Nutting. WarnerMedia gave the series a greenlight in June 2019 for their streaming service HBO Max. Patrick Somerville was the original season one showrunner and writer, with S. J. Clarkson directing. He was replaced as season one showrunner by Christina Lee. Made for Love was the first original series from HBO Max. On June 28, 2021, HBO Max renewed the series for a second season. Executive producers Christina Lee and Alissa Nutting were showrunners for season two. The series was canceled after two seasons on June 10, 2022. An official statement on the series cancellation from representatives from HBO Max said:

"We are tremendously grateful for the truly spectacular journey of these past two seasons, courtesy of Alissa Nutting, Christina Lee, Cristin, Billy, Ray, and the entire Made for Love cast and creative team – especially Zelda the talking dolphin and everyone's favorite synthetic love interest, Diane. Like a Gogol chip, the series will always be on our minds."

Made for Love was removed from HBO Max in late December 2022.

=== Casting ===
In July 2019, Cristin Milioti was cast to lead the series. Ray Romano was added in September 2019, with his deal only for one season. Noma Dumezweni would join in October 2019, with Billy Magnussen, Dan Bakkedahl and Augusto Aguilera added in November 2019. In December 2019, Raymond Lee was cast in a recurring role. In July 2021, Caleb Foote was promoted as a series regular for the second season. In November 2021, Sarunas J. Jackson who guest starred on the first season was promoted to a series regular while Chris Diamantopoulos and Angela Lin were cast in recurring roles with Paula Abdul to guest star for the second season.

== Episodes ==
=== Series overview ===
Season	Episodes	Originally released	
Season	Episodes	First released	Last released
1	8	April 1, 2021	April 15, 2021
2	8	April 28, 2022	May 19, 2022

=== Season 1 (2021) ===
No. overall	No. in season	Title	Directed by	Written by	Original release date
1	1	"User One"	Stephanie Laing	Alissa Nutting & Dean Bakopoulos & Patrick Somerville & Christina Lee	April 1, 2021
Hazel Green, wife of billionaire tech CEO Byron Gogol, escapes from the Hub, a massive virtual reality complex where they lived together for 10 years without leaving. She hitches a ride with a radio DJ who drops her off. Hazel, fearing she is being tracked, runs into a strip club and steals some clothes. Lyle, an employee close to her husband, finds Hazel and in the ensuing encounter she chops off some of his fingers then flees. Hazel hitches a ride to her dad's hometown, where she encounters a stranger receiving a call from Byron, informing her that Byron has implanted a device called "Made For Love" in her brain that tracks her sight, emotions, and whereabouts. Hazels runs into her dad's home where she finds him having sex with a sex doll named Diane. In shock, she faints and falls over. Flashback: 24 hours before escaping, Hazel's every move is being tracked by Byron's devices. She attends Gogol Inc's board meeting, where Byron reveals he knows she is lying about being happy.
2	2	"I Want a Divorce"	Alethea Jones	Alissa Nutting & Dean Bakopoulos & Patrick Somerville & Christina Lee	April 1, 2021
Hazel wakes up and tells her father, Herb, that she wants to leave Byron. She leaves the house with a shotgun, and encounters Lyle again. After failing to convince her to come with him, she shoots him several times, leaving him injured. Herb picks Hazel up and they try to find Herb's old plane to help her escape. They go to a bar called The Spotted Rose where Herb joins a mechanical bull-riding contest against the new owners of the plane - if he wins, Hazel can borrow the plane. Unfortunately, Herb is thrown off the bull and the two head back to Herb's house in defeat, only to find Byron and several security detail waiting for them. Hazel walks in and tells Byron, "I want a divorce." Flashback: Hazel loses consciousness, shattering a glass. Byron's lackeys shave off a lock of her hair and surgically implant the Made for Love chip in her brain.
3	3	"I Want This Thing Out of My Head"	Alethea Jones	Alissa Nutting & Sarah Solemani	April 1, 2021
Byron argues with Hazel about her indecisiveness and how he loves her even if she never fully loved him. Hazel sees through his manipulation, and when she asks to be able to take walks and smell things, he offers to make improvements on the Hub. She goes on a walk and finds the bartender from The Spotted Rose. She asks the bartender to masturbate while looking at her, which Byron witnesses via the chip. Byron leaves Herb's house in a fit of rage but once in bed, he watches her on his phone. Flashback: Hazel and Byron are interviewed for an episode of Weekend America where viewers learn more about the Hub, the secret little virtual world where recluse Byron has hidden away with Hazel since their first date (which ended in elopement). An interview is also made with Dr. Hodeck who reveals the chip implant was meant to help collect data on animals' emotions. When Byron unveils a commercial, starring him and a virtual likeness of Hazel, for the chip that will allow a couple to merge their consciousness, Hazel is visibly unsettled by the idea. It's also revealed that Dr. Hodeck's test subject, a dolphin named Zelda, helped Hazel escape the Hub by showing her a secret panel in the pool.
4	4	"I Want a New Life"	Stephanie Laing	Kim Steele & Sarah McCarron	April 8, 2021
In an effort to convince Hazel to come back to the Hub, Byron seeks to build a smell cube for her, and sends his assistant Bennett out to provide Hazel with some sample scents. Herb demands Hazel pay rent to continue staying with him. To make ends meet, Hazel steals phones from unwitting Yoga students and pawns them. She encounters her old friend Bangles at the pawn shop just as Bennett arrives to have Hazel smell the samples. Bangles and Hazel force Bennett to leave. They go back to Herb's home and after drinking alcohol, they taunt Byron by having Bangles moon Hazel, which Byron sees through her eyes. Meanwhile, Dr. Hodeck tries to find Zelda, fearing Byron did something to the dolphin that inadvertently helped Hazel escape. Flashback: During Hazel's college years, Byron finds Hazel scamming college students by selling fraudulent tickets. He asks her out on a first date, which is in a mobile virtual reality cube. After awing her by showing her the capabilities of the cube, he convinces her to marry him and to leave with him on the same night.
5	5	"I Want a Lawyer"	Stephanie Laing	Christina Lee	April 8, 2021
At the recommendation of Bangles, Hazel and her father go to a bowling alley to meet with a divorce lawyer who owes her cousin a favor. After much hesitation, Hazel reveals her husband is the billionaire tech mogul, Byron Gogol. The lawyer believes the chip in her brain is their ace, and physical proof he did something to her without her consent but seeing all this, Byron quickly hacks into the bowling alley TVs (showing incriminating photos of the lawyer) and after a quick phone call, the lawyer runs off. Byron commands Bennett to implant a chip into his head so he and Hazel can fully merge, even though Dr. Hodeck had previously warned that would kill her. Dr. Hodeck makes a deal with her ex-husband to sell the chip, the most valuable, revolutionary piece of software and she recruits Lyle to help find Hazel - they find her collapsed on a road after the apparent merge. Flashback: Dr Hodeck presents the revolutionary application of a cranial chip implant via data collected from Zelda. Her excitement over the possibilities of animal communication is stopped when Byron insists the chip would be better used in human application so there would be no secrets or lies between people.
6	6	"I Want You to Give a F*** About Me"	Stephanie Laing	Sarah McCarron & Sarah LaBrie	April 8, 2021
After telling Dr. Hodeck and Lyle that she now does not want the chip removed (as per the lawyer's advice), she is ultimately let go and Dr. Hodeck decides to give money to Lyle, who had his entire identity erased by Byron for apparently helping Hazel earlier. When Dr. Hodeck tries to quit, Byron traps her in the "pasture cube". Feeling betrayed and frustrated, Byron runs several beach simulations to try and figure out how to win over Hazel before realizing he needs to experience the real world, despite his fear and loathing of it. After Hazel gets upset that her father didn't care she was missing for hours, he brings an old flame to help her - Sister Judiff. The newly converted nun promises to get information but they can never see each other so Byron won't know who she is and try to scare her off. Hazel and her father go to visit her mother's grave and find it's gone because her father sold the burial plot.
7	7	"I Want to Feel Normal"	Stephanie Laing	Alissa Nutting	April 15, 2021
Hazel gets a job cleaning bathrooms at the bowling alley, hoping the things she sees repulses Byron. He's not actually watching her though because he insisted on trying to be normal while out in the real world, and got himself cornered by paparazzi. Lyle takes Bennett hostage and tries to bargain for his job and his identity back. Byron initially accepts his deal before leading him into the pasture cube to join Dr. Hodeck. Hazel convinces her dad to take his "synthetic companion" out on a real date. Byron gives a live press conference to the paparazzi and makes sure the TVs at the restaurant are tuned into his announcement about wanting to connect on a personal level. Hazel gets a chance to fly the plane her father built and sold, if only to feel a little taste of freedom. When Hazel and her father go home, they're greeted by one of Byron's drones - that drops off divorce papers. Flashback: For their anniversary, Hazel cautiously suggests the two of them go out to see a concert by her old favorite band, Warpaint. Byron hesitates and she backpedals but he quickly agrees. She is initially excited for a chance to leave the Hub and finally interact with the real world but finds he created a virtual replica of the concert venue into a cube, and hired the band. She offers a strained smile while he covers his ears, not liking the music.
8	8	"Let's Meet"	Stephanie Laing	Alissa Nutting & Patrick Somerville & Christina Lee	April 15, 2021
At Byron's request, Hazel meets him in person to sign the divorce papers but she picks the location - the local Sunrise Diner. He tries to argue for her to come back to the Hub, claiming things are better in his artificial, digital perfection than out in the real world but she is adamant she was imprisoned with no choices in her life. They go back and forth with him offering to be vulnerable and surprising them both with how much he lets loose. She still wants a divorce and he offers one last plea. Judiff and Herb head to the diner to spy on them and overhear Byron revealing to Hazel that her father has pancreatic cancer and if she goes back with him, he can save her father with his technology. She initially doesn't believe him and meets with her dad back home to celebrate her divorce with drinks. In the end, Hazel drugs her father and takes him and his things with her to the Hub where Byron is waiting for her.

=== Season 2 (2022) ===
No. overall	No. in season	Title	Directed by	Written by	Original release date
9	1	"I Have a Rotten Finger"	Daisy Mayer	Christina Lee & Alissa Nutting	April 28, 2022
10	2	"We're Losing Time"	Daisy Mayer	Jovan Robinson	April 28, 2022
11	3	"Diane...We're In Trouble"	Lisa Satriano	Shepard Boucher	May 5, 2022
12	4	"Another Byron, Another Hazel"	Nathaniel Goodman	Christina Lee	May 5, 2022
13	5	"You're Not the First"	Daisy von Scherler Mayer	Alissa Nutting	May 12, 2022
14	6	"Alice? Are You Listening?"	Daisy von Scherler Mayer	Shepard Boucher & Asmin Pathare	May 12, 2022
15	7	"Under Open Sky"	Wendey Stanzler	Christina Lee & Alissa Nutting	May 19, 2022
16	8	"Hazel vs. Hazel"	Wendey Stanzler	Christina Lee & Alissa Nutting	May 19, 2022

== Release ==
The series premiered on April 1, 2021, with the first 3 episodes available immediately. The second season premiered on April 28, 2022, with two episodes being released weekly.

== Reception ==
=== Critical response ===
For the first season, review aggregator Rotten Tomatoes reported an approval rating of 94% based on 54 critic reviews, with an average rating of 7.20/10. The website's critics consensus reads,"Made for Love's satirical riffs on technology are undeniably clever, but the most valuable special effects in this twisty odyssey are Cristin Milioti's charisma and comedic timing." Metacritic gave the first season a weighted average score of 68 out of 100 based on 18 critic reviews, indicating "generally favorable reviews".

Nina Metz of the Chicago Tribune rated the series 3.5/4 and found the series "cheekily bewitching, both sardonic and deeply deeply disturbing..." Ben Travers of IndieWire gave the series a B− and said, "Herbert is the proof that Made for Love still knows the real deal: that true love can't be quantified, only felt. The more the show lets us feel it, the better off it will be."

=== Accolades ===
Award	Date of ceremony	Category	Recipient(s)	Result	Ref.
Hollywood Critics Association TV Awards	August 29, 2021	Best Actress in a Streaming Series, Comedy	Cristin Milioti	Nominated	
Hollywood Critics Association TV Awards	August 29, 2021	Best Supporting Actor in a Streaming Series, Comedy	Ray Romano	Nominated	
Primetime Emmy Awards	September 19, 2021	Outstanding Cinematography for a Single-Camera Series (Half-Hour)	Nathaniel Goodman (for "User One")	Nominated	
Critics' Choice Television Awards	March 13, 2022	Best Supporting Actor in a Comedy Series	Ray Romano	Nominated	
