= Scott Steindorff =

International television and film producer and writer (born 1960)

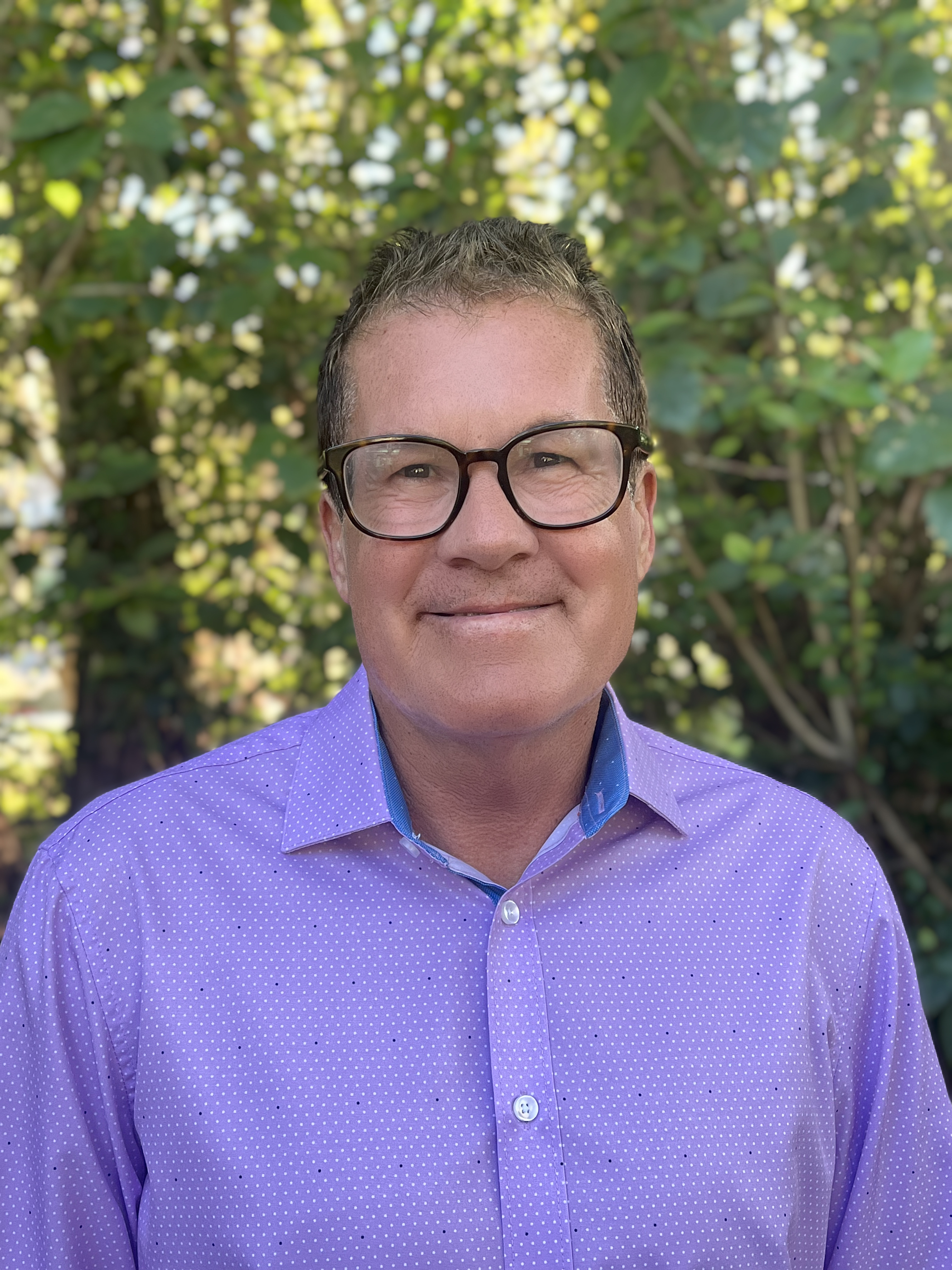
- Steindorff in 2022
- Born: Robert Scott Steindorff; September 2, 1960 (age 66); Minnesota, US
- Occupations: Television and film producer, writer, creator, entrepreneur
- Years active: 1995-present

Robert Scott Steindorff (born September 2, 1960) is an American television and film producer and writer, as well as an autism advocate.

== Early life and education ==
Steindorff was born in Minnesota and moved to Arizona during his childhood. He attended Arizona State University with a double major in theater and business.

== Career ==
Steindorff joined his father's real estate business and worked in real estate for twenty years. He eventually moved to California to pursue a film career, and continued to work as a real estate consultant. His real estate consultant work for Caesars Palace in Las Vegas helped him become an entertainment consultant for the venue, and he wrote for the EFX show at the MGM Grand Las Vegas. At age 35, he decided to become a producer.

In 1998, Steindorff formed the film production company Stone Village Productions. His first acquisition was "Night Magic" by Tom Tryon, to be adapted for a movie and for the stage. In 2012, his company expanded into a joint venture with Exclusive Media.

He has produced or executive produced Chef, Jane Got a Gun, Las Vegas, The Lincoln Lawyer, Penelope, Empire Falls, The Human Stain, Love in the Time of Cholera, and other works.

In January 2020, Steindorff joined the School of Art and Film at Arizona State University as a professor of practice.

In 2020, it was announced that Steindorff would be directing and producing the documentary Understanding Autism. Steindorff has said he developed the idea for the documentary after his diagnosis as an adult with the autism spectrum condition Asperger's. Simon Baron-Cohen of the University of Cambridge Autism Research Centre has been cast to host and interview other participants in the documentary, which include researchers and people with autism spectrum conditions. Understanding Autism was broadcast on PBS in March 2024.

In 2021, after acquiring the rights to develop the LA Magazine cover story "Shrooms! Shamans! Kosher LSD! Why Los Angeles Is Suddenly Tripping Out", Steindorff announced plans to work as the executive producer for a television series, Psychedelic City, as well as a related metaverse platform.

Steindorff worked as an executive producer on the television miniseries Station Eleven in 2021. Airing on HBO Max, Station Eleven is a post-apocalyptic saga based on the 2014 novel of the same name by Emily St. John Mandel. The miniseries was nominated for 49 awards, including 7 Primetime Emmys. It won 17 awards, including Best Science Fiction/Fantasy Series at the 2022 Critics' Choice Super Awards.

As of 2024, Steindorff is in production on In Search of Love, a documentary investigating the complexities of love, exploring the neuroscience behind the emotion, the enchantment of love, and the commitment necessary to maintain relationships. This project will interview subjects from all around the world, including singer-songwriter Shania Twain.

Another Steindorff production is another self-directed project, ADHD: Wired Differently. The film examines how ADHD affects functioning, relationships, and happiness.

== Filmography ==
=== Film ===
Year	Title	Credit	Notes	Status
2003	The Human Stain	Producer		
2006	Penelope	Producer		
2006	Turistas	Producer		
2007	Love in the Time of Cholera	Producer		
2009	Stan Helsing	Producer		
2011	The Lincoln Lawyer	Producer		
2013	Gimme Shelter	Executive producer		
2014	Chef	Executive producer		
2015	The D Train	Producer		
2015	Jane Got a Gun	Producer		
2024	Understanding Autism	Director/Producer		
TBA	The Caretaker	Producer		
TBA	ADHD: Wired Differently	Director/Producer		
TBA	In Search of Love	Director/Producer		

=== Television ===
Year	Title	Credit	Notes	Status
2003−08	Las Vegas	Executive producer		
2005	Empire Falls	Executive producer		
2017	Fire Chasers	Executive producer	Documentary	
2021−22	Station Eleven	Executive producer		
TBA	Butch Cassidy	Producer		
TBA	Frankenstein	Producer		
TBA	The Maidens	Producer		
TBA	Unsettled	Producer		
TBA	The Psychology of Stupidity	Producer		
TBA	Under the Wave at Waimea	Producer		
TBA	Just Watch Me	Producer		
TBA	The Last Day	Producer		
TBA	Austin	Producer		
TBA	Psychedelic City	Executive producer		
TBA	Waking Up	Producer		

Miscellaneous crew

Year	Title	Role
2005−07	Las Vegas	Consultant Creative consultant

As an actor

Year	Film	Role	Notes
1992	Double Trouble	Health Club Manager	Direct-to-video

Thanks

Year	Film	Role
2012	The Iceman	Special thanks

== Awards ==
- The miniseries Empire Falls received 10 Emmy Award nominations and the Golden Globe Award for Best Mini-series or Motion Picture Made for Television
- Station Eleven was nominated for Best Television Adaptation at the 2022 USC Scripter Awards,
- Station Eleven was nominated for Outstanding Lead Actor in a Limited or Anthology Series at the 2022 Primetime Emmy Awards, Nominated for Outstanding Directing for a Limited or Anthology Series or Movie at the 2022 Primetime Emmy Awards, Nominated for Outstanding Single-Camera Picture Editing for a Limited or Anthology Series or Movie at the 2022 Primetime Emmy Awards, Nominated for Outstanding Writing for a Limited or Anthology Series or Movie at the 2022 Primetime Emmy Awards, Nominated for Outstanding Music Composition for a Limited or Anthology Series, Movie, or Special (Original Dramatic Score) at the 2022 Primetime Emmy Awards, Nominated for Outstanding Cinematography for a Limited or Anthology Series. or Movie at the 2022 Primetime Emmy Awards, Nominated for Outstanding Sound Editing for a Limited or Anthology Series, Movie, or Special at the 2022 Primetime Emmy Awards.
- Station Eleven was nominated for the 2022 Dorian TV Awards for Best TV Movie or Limited Series.
- Station Eleven won Best Science Fiction/Fantasy Series and Best Actress in a Science Fiction/Fantasy Series at the 2022 Critics Choice Super Awards.
- Station Eleven was nominated for the 2022 USC Scripter Award in Television.
- Station Eleven was nominated for the 2022 Gold Derby Awards for best Limited Series.
- Station Eleven was nominated for the 2022 Gotham Awards for best Breakthrough Series (Longform), and most Outstanding Performance in a New Series.
- Station Eleven was nominated for the 2022 Hollywood Critics Association Television Awards for Best Writing in a Streaming Limited Series, Anthology Series, or movie, and Best Directing in a Streaming Limited Series, Anthology, Series, or Movie.
- Station Eleven was nominated for the 2022 Imagen Foundation Awards for Best Supporting Actor (Television Drama).
- Station Eleven won the 2022 International Online Cinema Awards for Best Actor in a Limited Series or TV Movie, and was nominated for Best Limited Series or TV Movie, Best Actress in a Limited Series or TV Movie, Best Supporting Actress in a Limited Series or TV Movie, Best Directing for a Limited Series or TV Movie, Best Writing for a Limited Series or TV Movie, and Best Ensemble in a Limited Series or TV Movie.
- Station Eleven won the 2022 Location Managers Guild International Awards for most Outstanding Locations in a Television Serial Program, Anthology, or Limited Series.
- Station Eleven won the 2022 Online Film and Television Association award for Best Cinematography in a Motion Picture, Limited, or Anthology Series, and was nominated for Best Direction of a Motion Picture or Limited Series, Best Writing of a Motion Picture or Limited Series, Best Music Composition in a Motion Picture, Limited, or Anthology Series, Best Picture Editing in a Motion Picture, Limited, or Anthology Series, and Best Makeup (Prosthetic).
- Station Eleven was nominated for the 2022 Peabody Award for Entertainment.
- Station Eleven won the 2022 Pena de Prata Award for best Breakthrough Performance in a Limited Series, Best Supporting Acting in a Limited Series, Best Limited Series or Anthology Series or TV Special, Best Episode in a Limited Series, Best Ensemble in a Limited Series or Anthology Series or TV Special, and was nominated for the best Breakthrough Performance in a Limited Series, Best Lead Acting in a Limited Series, Best Supporting Acting in a Limited Series, Best Episode in a Limited Series.
- Station Eleven won the 2022 ReFrame award for IMDbPros Top 200 Most Popular TV Titles 2021–2022.
- Station Eleven was nominated for the 2022 Television Critics Association Awards for most Outstanding Achievement in Movies, Miniseries, or Specials.
- Station Eleven was nominated for Best Edited Limited Series at the 2023 American Cinema Editors Awards.
- Station Eleven was nominated for 2023 Art Directors Guild Award for Best Television Movie or Limited Series.
- Station Eleven was nominated for Best Limited Series at the 2023 Critics Choice Awards.
- Station Eleven won the 2023 Directors Guild of America Award for Outstanding Directorial Achievement in Movies for Television and Limited Series, and was nominated for most Outstanding Directorial Achievement in Movies for Television and Limited Series.
- Station Eleven won the 2023 Directors Guild of Canada Award for Outstanding Directorial Achievement in Movies for Television and Mini-Series.
- Station Eleven was nominated for the 2023 Film Independent Spirit Awards for Best Lead Performance in a New Scripted Series, Best Supporting Performance in a New Scripted Series, and Best New Scripted Series.
- Station Eleven was nominated for the 2023 CAFTCAD Awards for Excellence in Crafts (Textile Arts) and Excellence in Crafts (Costume Illustration).

== Personal life ==
Steindorff has three children, Jamie, Jessica, and Jonathan. Steindorff is an avid skier and tennis player, residing in Malibu, CA. Steindorff is an advocate for spectrum disorders such as autism and ADHD. He is currently researching and writing a project on AI.
