= Greenlight Bookstore =

Bookstore in Brooklyn, New York

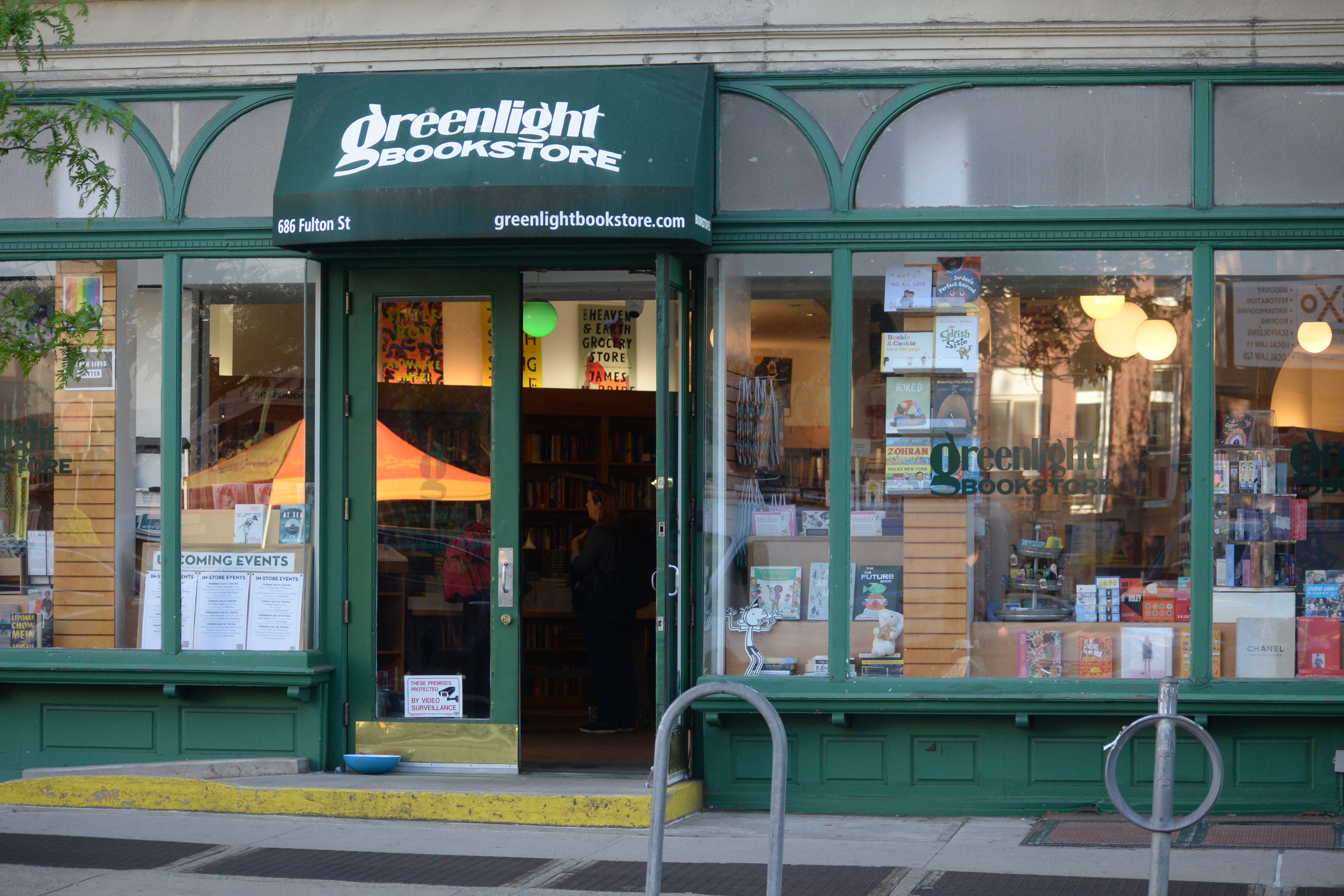
- Fort Greene location
- Interactive map of the Greenlight Bookstore area

General information
- Location: 686 Fulton Street; Brooklyn, NY 11217
- Coordinates: 40°41′11″N 73°58′28″W

Greenlight Bookstore is a Brooklyn independent bookstore on Fulton Street in Fort Greene. Established by Rebecca Fitting and Jessica Stockton-Bagnulo in 2009, it sells books in several genres, hosts events with authors, and is a partner of the Brooklyn Academy of Music. Originally, the bookstore had a second location in Prospect Lefferts Gardens, which closed in May of 2023 due to financial difficulties.

== History ==
Co-owners Fitting and Stockton-Bagnulo opened their first Greenlight Bookstore in Fort Greene in 2009 with some help from neighbors via a community lending program. In August of 2011, the bookstore opened two kiosks at the Brooklyn Academy of Music to sell both books and academy merchandise. In 2015, the bookstore opened a small pop-up at a Play Kids in Prospect Lefferts Gardens. A year later, a second location opened in Prospect Lefferts Garden on Flatbush Avenue.

During the COVID-19 pandemic, the bookstore closed its storefront and sold its stock of books through its online website—online sales increased by 500% in 2020. The bookstore also hosted book clubs and other events on Zoom. However, three-quarters of the staff were laid off, and Stockton-Bagnulo told Brooklyner that the bookstore's "annual profits had fallen 43% by June" of 2020 but improved during the holiday season such that annual sales "were down by just 14%."

In 2020, concerns were raised about anti-Black racism in Greenlight Bookstore including but not limited to racial profiling of Black customers and disrespect toward Black employees, as well as the bookstore's role in the gentrification of Fort Greene and Prospect Lefferts Garden. In July of that year, Fitting and Stockton-Bagnulo published an open letter expressing both an apology to the local community as well as a commitment toward revising company policies and improving business practices.

In 2021, Fitting stepped down as a co-owner of the bookstore after selling her stake to Stockton-Bagnulo, citing the difficulties of being a working parent during the COVID-19 pandemic. In 2023, Stockton-Bagnulo announced via e-mail that the Prospect Lefferts Garden location of Greenlight Bookstore was scheduled to close on May 14 due to financial difficulties suffered from the COVID-19 pandemic as well.

== Events ==
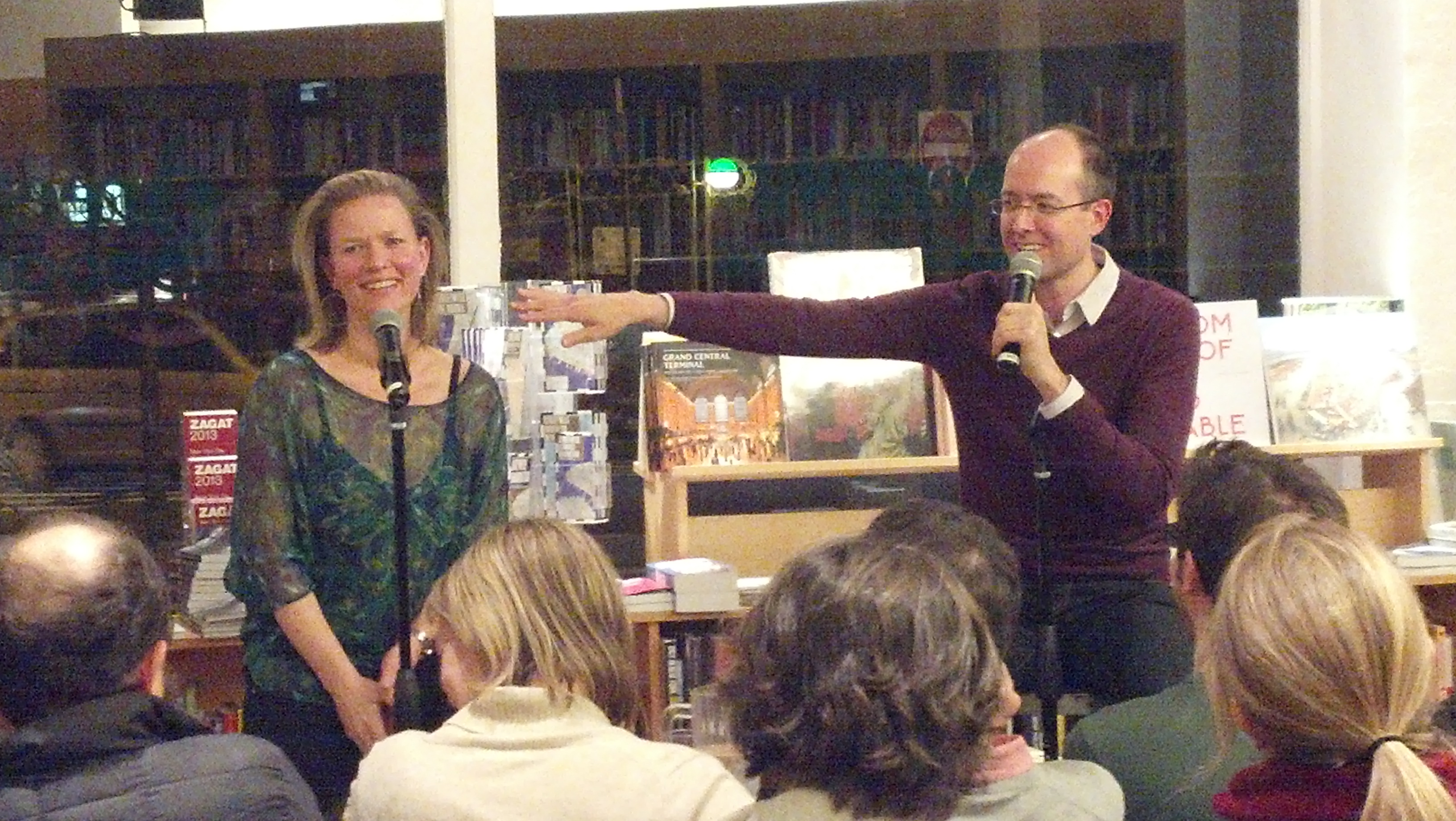
Amity Gaige and Adam Haslett at Greenlight Bookstore in 2013

Annually, the Greenlight Bookstore hosts a Where's Waldo? hunt in Fort Greene and Flatbush. The activity involves acquiring a stamp card from the bookstore and visiting over 40 partnered local businesses to receive stamps from. It was briefly suspended for two years during the COVID-19 pandemic as the bookstore shifted to online operations. The annual Where's Waldo? hunt resumed in July of 2022.

Past events have included Zadie Smith, Richard Dawkins, John Cleese, Elizabeth Gilbert, César Aira, Jeffrey Eugenides, and others. The bookstore has also hosted holiday events. In 2023, Curbed interviewed Catherine Lacey for her book launch of Biography of X at Greenlight Bookstore. For the publication of The City and Its Uncertain Walls by Haruki Murakami, Greenlight Bookstore was one of the US bookstores which hosted a Murakami Midnight Party on November 18, 2024.
