= Station Eleven =

2014 novel by Emily St. John Mandel

- First edition
- Author: Emily St. John Mandel
- Language: English
- Genre: Post-apocalyptic fiction, Theatre-fiction
- Publisher: HarperCollins (CAN); Knopf (US); Picador (UK)
- Publication date: September 9, 2014 (CAN); September 9, 2014 (US); September 10, 2014 (UK)
- Publication place: United States; United Kingdom
- Media type: Print (hardback & paperback)
- Pages: 336 pp.
- ISBN: 9781443434867 (paperback 1st ed.); 9780385353304 (hardcover US ed.); 9781447268963 (hardcover UK ed.)

Station Eleven is a novel by the Canadian writer Emily St. John Mandel. It takes place in the Great Lakes region before and after a fictional influenza pandemic, known as the Georgia Flu, has devastated the world, killing most of the population. Published in 2014, it won the Arthur C. Clarke Award the following year.

The novel was well received by critics, with the understated nature of Mandel's writing receiving particular praise. It appeared on several best-of-year lists. As of 2020, it had sold 1.5 million copies.

A ten-part television adaptation of the same name premiered on HBO Max in December 2021.

The book was selected for the 2023 edition of Canada Reads, where it was championed by Michael Greyeyes.

== Plot summary ==
During a production of King Lear at the Elgin Theatre in Toronto, aspiring paramedic Jeevan Chaudhary watches as the actor playing Lear, Arthur Leander, has a heart attack. Jeevan tries to resuscitate Arthur but is unsuccessful. As an ambulance arrives, Arthur already dead, Jeevan comforts one of the child actors in the production, Kirsten Raymonde. After leaving the play, Jeevan goes for a walk in the snow and receives a call from his friend who is a doctor in Los Angeles. He warns Jeevan to get out of the city, as the mysterious and deadly Georgia Flu is spreading rapidly worldwide and has unprecedented contagiousness and lethality, killing 99% of those infected within days. Jeevan loads up on supplies and goes to stay with his brother Frank. Many of the actors and others who had gathered to mourn Arthur's death die within the next three weeks.

Twenty years later, Kirsten is part of a nomadic group of actors and musicians known as the Traveling Symphony. Kirsten, who was eight at the time of the outbreak, can remember little of her life before Year Zero, but clings to a two-volume set of comic books given to her by Arthur before his death, titled Station Eleven. The troupe operates on a two-year cycle touring the Great Lakes region, performing Shakespeare plays and classical music, while Kirsten scavenges abandoned homes for props, costumes, and traces of Arthur in tabloid magazines.

The troupe intends to reunite with two members they left behind, Charlie the by-now mother of one year, and her husband Jeremy. Upon arriving, they are disturbed to find that their friends are missing, and that the town is now under the control of the Prophet, a cult leader who has raped several young girls he claims as his "wives". The troupe quickly leaves, going off-route to the Museum of Civilization, a settlement where they believe they might find their missing friends. En route, they discover a young stowaway who fled the town, as she was promised to the Prophet as his next bride. The troupe worries that the cult will come after them. Shortly after, members of the troupe begin to disappear, until finally the entire troupe is gone, leaving only Kirsten and her friend August. Frightened, they continue on to the Museum, hoping to be reunited with others.

Unbeknownst to Kirsten, Station Eleven is an unpublished passion project by Arthur's first wife Miranda Carroll. Fourteen years before the collapse of civilization, Miranda left an abusive boyfriend and married Arthur, a friend from her hometown in coastal British Columbia who has since become a famous actor. As Arthur's fame hit its peak, Miranda realized he was having an affair with the woman who would become his second wife, actress Elizabeth Colton. The night that Miranda discovers the affair, she walks out of her home and asks a paparazzo outside if he has a cigarette; the paparazzo is Jeevan. Years later, when Jeevan is trying to reinvent himself as an entertainment journalist, Arthur gives him an exclusive interview, telling Jeevan that he is leaving Elizabeth and their young son Tyler to be with another woman. Jeevan reflects on this while he and Frank are quarantining in Frank's apartment. After many weeks, they realize that no one is coming to save them. Frank, who is paraplegic, kills himself to spare Jeevan from feeling responsible for him. Jeevan embarks on a journey south, and after many years, finds a new settlement in Virginia, where he marries and becomes the town doctor.

In Year Zero, Arthur's best friend, Clark Thompson, informs Elizabeth that Arthur is dead. Clark, Elizabeth, and Tyler happen to board the same flight from New York City to Toronto to attend Arthur's funeral, but it is grounded at the Severn City Airport due to the pandemic. The passengers, having nowhere to go, create a settlement in the airport, and Clark becomes the "curator" of the Museum of Civilization, where he gathers artifacts from the old world such as iPhones and laptop computers. While most of the airport survivors adapt to their new life, Elizabeth and Tyler embrace religious zealotry, believing that the pandemic happened for a reason and spared those who were good. After two years, they leave with a religious cult.

In the present, Kirsten and August find a group of the Prophet's men holding Sayid, a member of their troupe, hostage. They kill the men and free Sayid, who explains that their friend Dieter was killed, while another hostage escaped, warned the troupe, and sent them on another road; this explains how the rest of the Symphony went missing. The trio leave for the Severn City Airport, but Kirsten is discovered by the Prophet. Just before he is about to kill her, he refers to the "Undersea," a place from the Station Eleven comics. Kirsten quotes lines from Station Eleven, distracting the Prophet long enough that a younger cult sentry, having a crisis of faith, shoots and kills the Prophet, before taking his own life. The trio continues to the Museum of Civilization, where they are reunited with Charlie, Jeremy, and the rest of the troupe. Clark, who has lived in the museum for twenty years, realizes who Kirsten is and her connection to Arthur, and that the Prophet was Tyler Leander. At night, Clark takes Kirsten up to the control tower of the airport, where he shows her there is a town with electric lights, suggesting civilization is beginning to take root again.

Five weeks later, Kirsten leaves with the Traveling Symphony for this town. She gives one copy of Station Eleven to Clark's museum. He begins to read it and recognizes a scene that is based on a dinner party which he, Arthur, and Miranda once attended (the one at which Miranda realized that Arthur was having an affair with Elizabeth and at which she asked Jeevan for a cigarette).

== Main characters ==
- Kirsten Raymonde – A former child actor from Toronto who is eight years old when the Georgia Flu destroys her world. Initially, she and her brother are the only survivors in her family, but as they travel, he dies after stepping on a nail and without medical treatment. She joins the Traveling Symphony as a teenager and becomes obsessed with actor Arthur Leander, whose death she witnessed as a child on the first day of the pandemic.
- Arthur Leander – A wildly successful film actor originally from the (fictional) Delano Island in British Columbia. Despite his success, Arthur is shiftless, unhappy, and marries three times. He dies onstage of a heart attack while portraying King Lear at age 51, the same night the pandemic begins.
- Jeevan Chaudhary – A former paparazzo, turned entertainment journalist, turned emergency medical technician (EMT), whose life intersects with Leander's at key moments.
- Frank Chaudhary – Jeevan's paraplegic brother, a former war reporter wounded in Libya, now a ghostwriter who lives a life of solitude in his apartment.
- Miranda Carroll – Arthur's first wife, eleven years his junior. She is initially an artist who is obsessed with creating her graphic novel, Station Eleven, about Dr. Eleven, a man who lives on a defunct planetary space station. She later becomes a proficient businesswoman. Shortly before Arthur's death, Miranda gives him two copies of the finally-completed graphic novel, which Arthur gives to his son, Tyler, and the child-actor Kirsten. Mandel has said Miranda is the character she most identifies with. Miranda dies in Malaysia of the pandemic.
- Clark Thompson – Arthur's English best friend, whom he met while they were struggling actors. He then works as a management consultant, and post-collapse, reinvents himself as a curator to a museum of obsolete objects.
- Tyler Leander – The son of Arthur and his second wife Elizabeth. He grows up in Jerusalem, estranged from his father, and is later stranded in the settlement at the (fictional) Severn City Airport. He and his mother eventually leave with a religious cult, and he grows up to be the religious leader known as the Prophet.

== Genre ==
Although many publications classified the novel as science fiction, Mandel does not believe that the work belongs to that genre. She said the issue of labeling her work science fiction (as opposed to literary fiction) has followed her through all her novels. Her early work was classified as crime fiction, and she has stated she consciously chose to avoid overtones of mystery and crime in this work in order to avoid being "pigeonholed" as a mystery novelist. Station Eleven has also been discussed as "theatre-fiction".

== Awards ==
The novel won the Arthur C. Clarke Award in May 2015, beating novels including The Girl with All the Gifts and Memory of Water. The committee highlighted the novel's focus on the survival of human culture after an apocalypse, as opposed to the survival of humanity. The novel won the Toronto Book Award in October 2015.

The novel was also a finalist for the National Book Award, ultimately losing to Phil Klay's short story cycle Redeployment. It was also a finalist for the PEN/Faulkner Award, as well as the Baileys Women's Prize for Fiction.

== Adaptation ==
In 2015, it was announced that a film adaptation of the novel was in development by Scott Steindorff.

Station Eleven was adapted into a miniseries for HBO Max that premiered on December 16, 2021, with Hiro Murai directing and Patrick Somerville as showrunner and writer. Both also serve as executive producers, alongside Scott Steindorff, Scott Delman, and Dylan Russell. The miniseries stars Mackenzie Davis as Kirsten and Himesh Patel as Jeevan. Gael García Bernal portrays Arthur, and David Wilmot, Clark.
