= Christina Lee (producer) =

American writer and producer

Christina Lee is an American writer and producer. She was a writer and executive producer for Wet Hot American Summer: First Day of Camp, Wet Hot American Summer: Ten Years Later, Search Party, and Made for Love.

== Life and career ==
Lee previously worked as an executive at Comedy Central. She was consulting producer and writer for the ABC series Super Fun Night (2013–2014) She was later co-executive producer and co-writer for the miniseries Wet Hot American Summer: First Day of Camp (2015) and Wet Hot American Summer: Ten Years Later (2017). In 2017, Lee co-produced a pilot for Diarra Kilpatrick titled The Climb for Amazon Prime, which was not picked up for a series but which was aired and received reviews.

Lee joined Search Party as a co-executive producer and writer and stayed on for the run of the series (2016–2021). Next, she was a consulting producer and then showrunner for the HBO Max series Made For Love (2021–2022). In 2021 she signed an overall multi-year deal with Warner Bros. Television.

Lee is set to executive produce Greta Lee's A24 adaptation of the nonfiction book Minor Feelings by Cathy Park Hong.

Lee is Korean American. She lives in Los Angeles with her husband and daughter.
