= Made for Love (novel) =

2017 novel by Alissa Nutting

- First edition
- Author: Alissa Nutting
- Publisher: Ecco Press
- Publication date: 2017
- ISBN: 978-0-06-228055-8

Made for Love is a 2017 novel by American writer Alissa Nutting.

== Reception ==
Annalisa Quin, writing for NPR, gave the novel a mixed review, saying that the book's "....ideas are never more interesting than in their first iterations."

== HBO Series ==
An HBO Max series based on the book premiered on April 1, 2021.
