= Wet Hot American Summer (franchise) =

American satirical comedy media franchise

- Created by: David Wain and Michael Showalter
- Original work: Wet Hot American Summer (2001)

Print publications
- Book(s): Wet Hot American Summer: The Annotated Screenplay (2018)
- Graphic novel(s): Wet Hot American Summer (2018)

Films and television
- Film(s): Wet Hot American Summer (2001); Hurricane of Fun: The Making of Wet Hot (2015)
- Web series: Wet Hot American Summer: First Day of Camp (2015); Wet Hot American Summer: Ten Years Later (2017)

Games
- Role-playing: Wet Hot American Summer: Fantasy Camp (2017)

Audio
- Original music: Wet Hot American Summer (Original Score & Music from the Motion Picture) (2016)

Official website
- http://davidwain.com/whas/

Wet Hot American Summer is an American satirical comedy media franchise created by David Wain and Michael Showalter with stories centered on Camp Firewood, a summer camp located near Waterville, Maine. Since the release of the 2001 film, the franchise has expanded to include a documentary film, two television series, two books, a tabletop role-playing game and a soundtrack.

The originating film was Wet Hot American Summer (2001), which was for 14 years the only produced media in the franchise. There were speculations and reports on a possible sequel for years, including a 2003 pilot, written for Fox, which was eventually not picked up. In 2015, Netflix, released the first of two web miniseries, Wet Hot American Summer: First Day of Camp, followed by Wet Hot American Summer: Ten Years Later two years later. Hurricane of Fun: The Making of Wet Hot, a documentary film, with footage taken during the 2001 film's production, was also released in 2015 and in 2016, the original film's soundtrack was released for the first time. In 2017, a tabletop role-playing game was released after a successful Kickstarter campaign. A book version of the screenplay of the original film and a graphic novel were released in 2018. The film was released on both VHS and DVD formats in 2002 and re-released on Blu-ray in 2015 which included additional features.

Wain, Showalter and other members of the cast have kept public interest in the franchise with events including a 10th anniversary event and a live radio play at SF Sketchfest which both featured appearances of original cast members. The SF Sketchfest event produced a complete play of the film with replacements for missing original cast members by other accomplished actors and comedians. Both event recordings were released in 2015 as part of the film's Blu-ray edition.

== Cinematic work ==
=== Films ===
Wet Hot American Summer related films
Film	U.S. release date	Director	Screenwriter(s)	Producer(s)
Wet Hot American Summer	January 23, 2001 (Note: The film had its premier at the 2001 Sundance Film Festival, but later had its theatrical release on July 27, 2001.)	David Wain	David Wain and Michael Showalter	Howard Bernstein
Hurricane of Fun: The Making of Wet Hot	August 6, 2015	Amy Rice	—	Jack Turner

==== Wet Hot American Summer (2001) ====
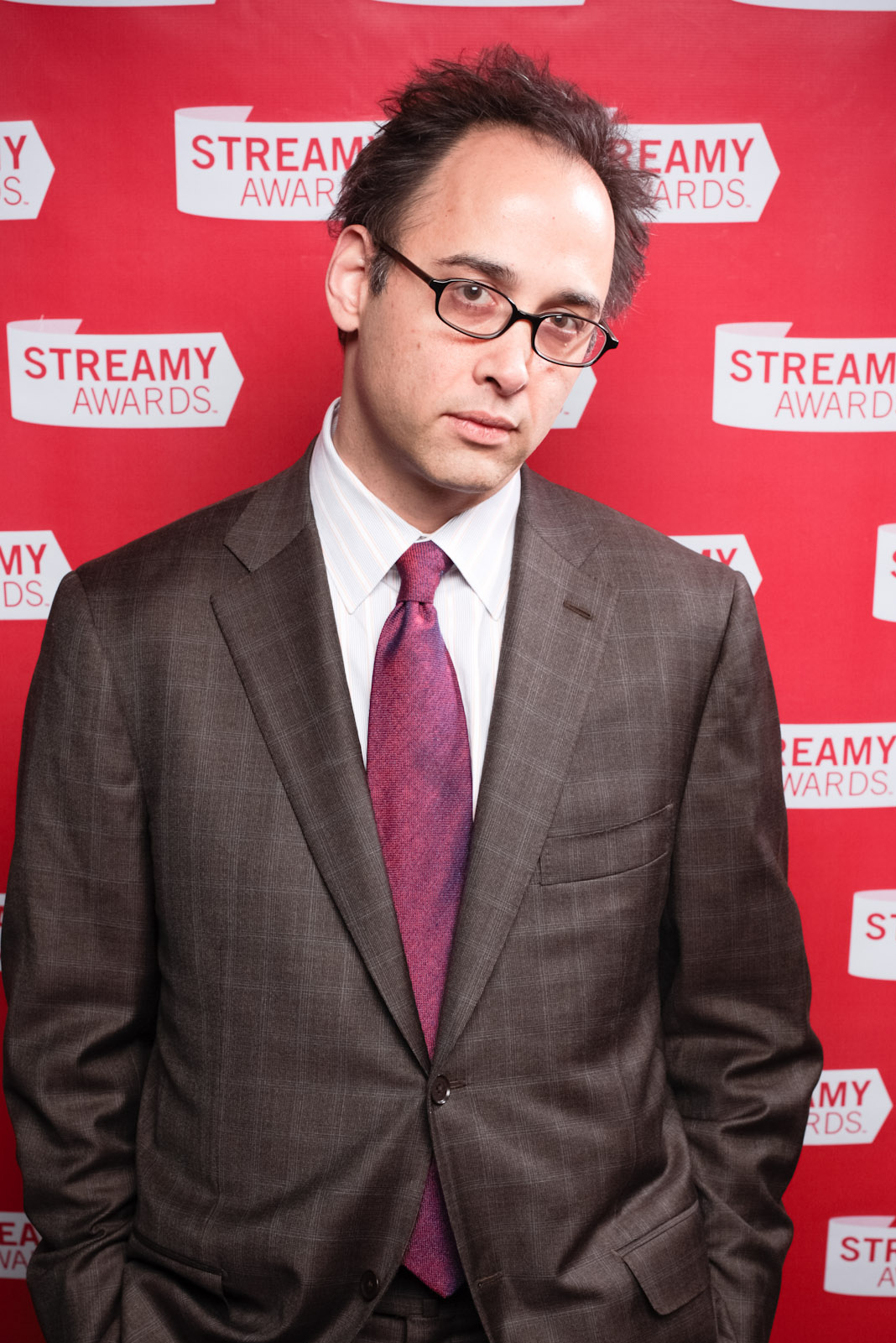
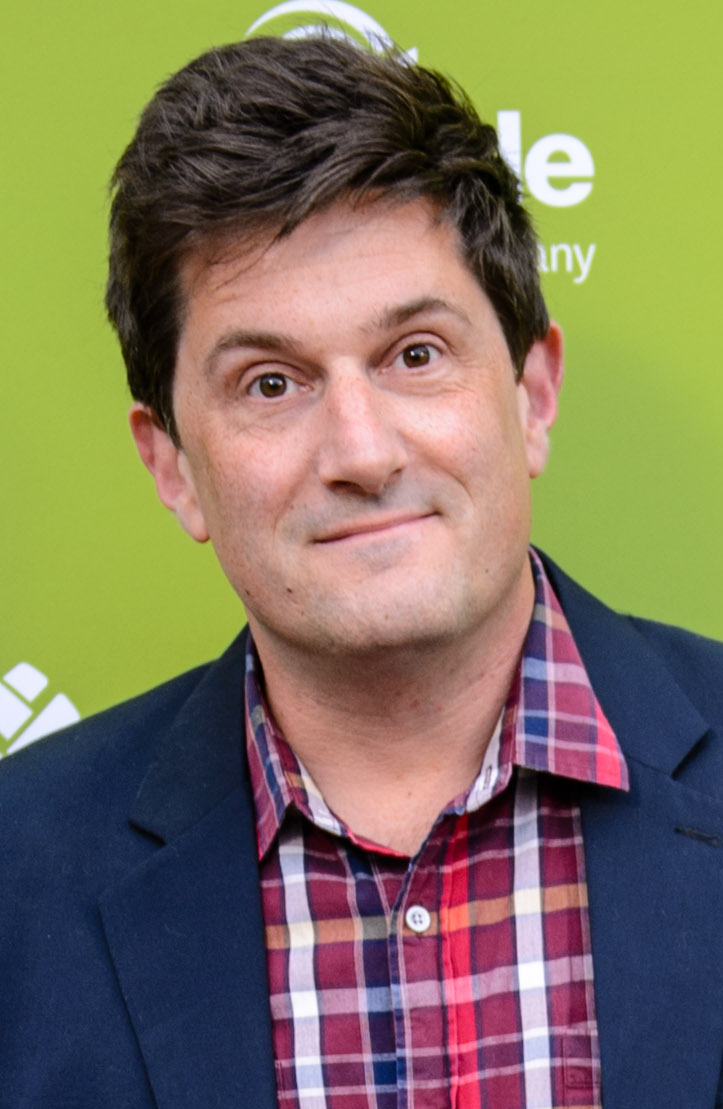
David Wain (left) and Michael Showalter (right) wrote and directed the film and most later works.

In 1981, Camp Firewood, a summer camp located near Waterville, Maine, is preparing for its last day of camp which culminates in a talent show. Meanwhile, the counselors have one last chance to have a romantic encounter with another person at Camp Firewood before the day ends.

Directed by David Wain and written by Wain and Michael Showalter, the film is based on the experiences Wain had while attending Camp Modin, a Jewish camp, located in Belgrade, Maine, and Showalter had at Camp Mohawk in the Berkshires in Cheshire, Massachusetts. According to Wain, they wanted to make a film structured like the films Nashville, Dazed and Confused and Do the Right Thing—"films that take place in one contained time period that have lots of different characters".

The film had its premier at the 2001 Sundance Film Festival. The film's financing took three years to assemble; in a June 2011 interview, Wain revealed the film's budget was $1.8 million and noted that during the 2001 Sundance Film Festival, the film had been promoted as costing $5 million in an attempt to attract a better offer from a distributor. Because of the film's relatively small budget, the cast was paid very little; Paul Rudd has stated that he is uncertain that he received any compensation at all for the film. The film was eventually picked up by USA Films for a very low price and released on July 27, 2001, in only two theaters, both in New York City, later releasing it to 20 more theaters.

==== Hurricane of Fun: The Making of Wet Hot (2015) ====
Alongside the prequel Netflix web miniseries, a making-of documentary film, Hurricane of Fun: The Making of Wet Hot, was released on digital platforms on August 6, 2015. Directed by Amy Rice, who served as the set photographer of the original Wet Hot American Summer, the documentary features behind-the-scenes interviews and footage shot during the filming of the film.

=== Netflix miniseries ===
Wet Hot American Summer Netflix miniseries
Series	Season	Episodes	Originally released	Showrunners
Wet Hot American Summer: First Day of Camp	1	8	July 31, 2015	David Wain and Michael Showalter
Wet Hot American Summer: Ten Years Later	2	8	August 4, 2017	David Wain and Michael Showalter

==== Wet Hot American Summer: First Day of Camp (2015) ====
In 1981, weeks prior to the events of the film, Camp Firewood, is starting its first day of summer camp. The web miniseries has four main plot threads: The head counselors discover Xenstar is dumping toxic waste on the camp grounds and expose a conspiracy which includes the U.S. government and President Ronald Reagan; sex and romance; Camp Tigerclaw's rivalry with Camp Firewood; and Electro City musical production starring the camp's counselors.

After years of speculations and reports on a possible sequel to Wet Hot American Summer, shooting began on the miniseries in January 2015, with it being released on Netflix on July 31, 2015. The eight-episode Netflix miniseries, created by Wain and Showalter, is a prequel to the 2001 film. The entire adult cast of the film returned in the same roles, in addition to cameos and guest roles from other recognizable actors.

==== Wet Hot American Summer: Ten Years Later (2017) ====
On August 18, 1981, the junior counselors of Camp Firewood made a vow to meet again in 10 years to see what kind of people they would turn into. In 1991, the ten-year reunion has arrived. The counselors, now in their mid-20s have grown up and with their lives taking different paths, with some having found love, and some having found professional success. Seeking vengeance, former U.S. President Ronald Reagan is trying to destroy the camp with the help of current U.S. President George H. W. Bush and former Camp Tigerclaw counselors.

The eight-episode Netflix miniseries, created by Wain and Showalter, was released on Netflix on August 4, 2017. and is a sequel to both the 2001 film Wet Hot American Summer, and the 2015 prequel miniseries. Almost the entire adult cast from the film and 2015 miniseries returned in the same roles, in addition to a group of new characters from other recognizable actors. Bradley Cooper was unavailable to reprise his role, as he was directing and starring in A Star Is Born, but he appears in still images and his character is played by Adam Scott. Actors Judah Friedlander and Kevin Sussman (Ron and Steve, respectively) did not return as well.

=== Recurring cast and characters ===
List indicators

This section includes characters who will appear or have appeared in multiple cinematic works in the Wet Hot American Summer franchise.

- An empty grey cell indicates the character was not in the film, or that the character's official presence has not yet been confirmed.
- ^{O} indicates an older version of the character.
- ^{P} indicates an appearance in onscreen photographs.
- ^{V} indicates a voice-only role.
- ^{Y} indicates a younger version of the character.

Recurring cast and characters appearances in all three cinematic works
Character	Actor	Wet Hot American Summer	First Day of Camp	Ten Years Later
Abby Bernstein	Marisa Ryan			
Abby Bernstein	Bebe Wood		^{Y}	
Arty "The Beekeeper" Solomon	Liam Norton			
Arty "The Beekeeper" Solomon	George Dalton			
Arty "The Beekeeper" Solomon	Samm Levine	^{V}	^{V}	^{O}
Andy	Paul Rudd			
Ben	Bradley Cooper			^{P}
Ben	Adam Scott			
Beth	Janeane Garofalo			
Blake	Josh Charles			
Brodfard Gilroy	Rob Huebel			
Courtney	Kristen Wiig			
Dave	Paul Scheer			
Donna Berman	Lake Bell			
Eric	Chris Pine			
Gail von Kleinenstein	Molly Shannon			
Gary	A. D. Miles			
Gene Jenkinson / Jonas Jurgenson	Christopher Meloni			
Gerald "Coop" Cooperberg	Michael Showalter			
Graham	Rich Sommer			
Greg	Jason Schwartzman			
Henry Newman	David Hyde Pierce			
J.J	Zak Orth			
Katie Finnerty	Marguerite Moreau			
Lindsay	Elizabeth Banks			
Logan St. Bogan	John Early			
McKinley	Michael Ian Black			
Mitch / Can of Mixed Vegetables	H. Jon Benjamin			
Nancy	Nina Hellman			
Neil	Joe Lo Truglio			
Ron Von Kleinenstein	Judah Friedlander			
U.S. President Ronald Reagan	Michael Showalter			
Shari	Beth Dover			
Steve	Kevin Sussman			
Susie	Amy Poehler			
Victor Pulak	Ken Marino			
Warner	Eric Nenninger			
Yaron	David Wain			

Claire (Sarah Burns) and Mark (Mark Feuerstein), new characters introduced in Ten Years Later, were added retroactively to a flashback scene from the film. Jim Stansel, who is mentioned in the film, is portrayed by Michael Cera in First Day of Camp. A few actors played more than one role. Showalter, in addition to portraying Gerald "Coop" Cooperberg in the film and both miniseries, portrays Alan Shemper in the film and U.S. President Ronald Reagan in both miniseries; Michael Ian Black, in addition to portraying McKinley in the film and both miniseries, portrays U.S. President George H. W. Bush in Ten Years Later; Wain, in addition to portraying Yaron in both miniseries, has an uncredited role as Paco in the film and portrays Arkansas Governor Bill Clinton in Ten Years Later.

=== Home media ===
The film was released in both VHS and DVD formats on January 15, 2002. In 2011, Wain tried to convince Universal Pictures to re-release a DVD which would include special features for the film's then 10th anniversary which Universal rejected. In a Q&A Wain said that he "would be willing to do a new prequel teaser short for it and new interviews and new material but they were like, 'No, nobody buys it. Nobody cares.'". The film was eventually released on Blu-ray on May 12, 2015. This edition included highlights from the 10th anniversary event, the live radio play from SF Sketchfest, deleted scenes, cast comments, behind the scenes, feature commentary with cast & crew, songs with production stills and the theatrical trailer.

=== Reception ===
==== Critical response ====
The Rotten Tomatoes' score is based on the percentage of critics who have given a positive review; The Metacritic's score is a weighted average of the published critic reviews listed on the page.

Wet Hot American Summer films and Netflix miniseries average critic score
Cinematic work	Rotten Tomatoes		Metacritic	
Cinematic work	Score	No. of reviews	Score	No. of reviews
Wet Hot American Summer	33%	67	42	24
Wet Hot American Summer: First Day of Camp	92%	53	74	23
Wet Hot American Summer: Ten Years Later	78%	23	67	12

==== Accolades ====
Wet Hot American Summer films and Netflix miniseries nominations and awards
Cinematic work	Award	Ceremony (Note: Each date is linked to the article about the awards held that year, wherever possible.)	Category	Recipients	Result	Ref.
Wet Hot American Summer	Gotham Awards	October 1, 2001	Breakthrough Director (Open Palm Award)	David Wain	Nominated	
First Day of Camp	Critics' Choice Television Award	January 17, 2016	Best Guest Actor/Actress in a Comedy Series	John Slattery	Nominated	
First Day of Camp	Golden Trailer Awards	May 4, 2016	Best Comedy Poster	Netflix	Nominated	
First Day of Camp	Golden Reel Awards	February 27, 2016	Best Sound Editing in Television - Short Form: Musical	Emily Kwong	Nominated	
First Day of Camp	Artios Awards	January 19, 2017	Outstanding Achievement in Casting – Television Pilot and First Season - Comedy	Susie Farris, Melanie Crescenz	Nominated	
Ten Years Later	Make-Up Artists and Hair Stylists Guild Awards	February 24, 2018	TV Miniseries Or Movie Made For TV: Best Period and/or Character Makeup	Lindsay Garrison, Laura Peyer, Alex Perrone	Nominated	

=== Music ===
==== Theme ====
The opening song of the film and the theme song of both miniseries is "Jane" by Jefferson Starship.

==== Soundtracks ====
Wet Hot American Summer film soundtrack album
Title	Release date	Length	Composer(s)	Label
Wet Hot American Summer (Original Score & Music from the Motion Picture)	June 10, 2016	38.25	Theodore Shapiro & Craig Wedren	Rusted Wave

===== Wet Hot American Summer (Original Score & Music from the Motion Picture) (2016) =====
====== Soundtrack track listing ======
All music composed by Theodore Shapiro & Craig Wedren, except where noted. The vinyl release has the tracks split between Side A and Side B.

Side A
No.	Title	Length
1.	"Dawn"	0:55
2.	"Flagpole"	1:37
3.	"Backwards from Three" (Performed by Theodore Shapiro & Craig Wedren)	1:24
4.	"Morning Makeup"	0:45
5.	"Capture the Flag"	2:16
6.	"Bbq"	1:06
7.	"Love (Needs a Lot of Sunlight)"	2:33
8.	"Birthplace of Spaghetti"	1:02
9.	"Can of Vegetables / Gene's Address"	2:28
10.	"Flannel Exchange Program"	0:44
11.	"Goodbye"	1:34
12.	"Rapid Rescue"	1:33
13.	"Day by Day" (Written by Stephen Schwartz / Performed by Wet Hot American Summer cast)	1:43

Side B
No.	Title	Length
14.	"Soul of a Woman"	1:14
15.	"Mousse You Up"	0:50
16.	"Bags Are Packed"	0:46
17.	"Wet Hot American Summer" (Craig Wedren)	2:21
18.	"American Summer"	0:53
19.	"10AM / Bowlegged and Bilingual"	1:11
20.	"Higher and Higher / Wind" (Performed by Theodore Shapiro & Craig Wedren)	3:41
21.	"Summer in America" (Mr. Blue & Chubb Rock)	3:47
22.	"Wet Hot American Dream" (Peter Salett)	3:09
23.	"10 Years from Today" (Performed by Wet Hot American Summer cast)	0:53

====== Soundtrack release ======
The soundtrack was released by Rusted Wave on June 10, 2016 on Amazon, Google Play, iTunes and Spotify A vinyl edition was released in July 2016 in two versions, with Mondo releasing an exclusive colorway, pressed on campfire colored vinyl. The vinyl edition included behind-the-scenes photos and original artwork by Andy Ristaino.

===== Wet Hot American Summer: First Day of Camp =====
While an official soundtrack was not released for the Netflix miniseries, its composer Craig Wedren has released the songs on SoundCloud.

==== Singles ====
Wet Hot American Summer released singles
Title	U.S. release date	Length	Artist(s)	Label
"Higher and Higher / Wet Hot American Summer (Music from the Motion Picture)"	August 3, 2015	6:04	Craig Wedren & Theodore Shapiro	Rusted Wave

===== "Higher and Higher / Wet Hot American Summer (Music from the Motion Picture)" (2015) =====
The vinyl release has the tracks split between Side A and Side B.

====== Single track listing ======
Side A
No.	Title	Music	Length
1.	"Higher and Higher / Wind"	Craig Wedren & Theodore Shapiro	3:42

Side B
No.	Title	Music	Length
2.	"Wet Hot American Summer"	Craig Wedren	2:22

====== Single release ======
The single was released by Rusted Wave on August 3, 2015 and is available on Amazon, Google Play, iTunes and Spotify. In addition, A vinyl 7-inch edition was released.

==== "I Am a Wolf, You Are the Moon" ====
In the Wet Hot American Summer: First Day of Camp episode "Staff Party", Andy leads the Camp Firewood counselors in a sing-along with the song "I Am a Wolf, You Are the Moon", an original song by Craig Wedren. On writing the song, Wedren said, "I knew they needed an acoustic sing-along song all the kids would know [...] It's got that sort of bittersweet youth anthem thing. That was kind of why it made so much sense to me, this idea of wanting the world and wanting it now. It kind of works from the vantage point of being young, but also through the looking-glass of us at age 46 reflecting back on being young."

A music video was released on June 10, 2016. The music video was co-directed by Amy Redford and Wedren, who also sings the tune and appears in the video. The music video features cameos from Sam Trammel, Thomas Lennon and Allie Stamler.

== Print publications ==
=== Wet Hot American Summer: The Annotated Screenplay (2018) ===
The screenplay for the original film was released on October 9, 2018, as a book called Wet Hot American Summer: The Annotated Screenplay by Abrams Image. The book was written by Wain and Showalter with a preface by Jesse Thorn and a foreword by Michael Ian Black and provides commentary and insight to Wain and Showalter's artistic decisions for the film and Netflix miniseries, photos and more. On October 5, 2018, a trailer for the book was released on YouTube and on October 10, a book release event hosted by Wain was held on October 10, 2018, at the UCB Theatre.

=== Wet Hot American Summer (2018) ===
A graphic novel written by Christopher Hastings, illustrated by Noah Hayes and published by Boom! Studios was released on November 7, 2018. The story takes place one week after First Day of Camp with Beth having 24 hours to save the camp from being shut down.

== Games ==
=== Wet Hot American Summer: Fantasy Camp (2017) ===
A tabletop role-playing game designed by Geoffrey Golden and Lee Keeler and published by The Devastator was released on November 7, 2017. Fantasy Camp was the first officially licensed game based on the franchise and was founded through a Kickstarter campaign which started on April 18, 2017 and ended the following month on May 18. It succeeded in raising $15,594 from 485 backers.

== Undeveloped TV series ==
During a 2015 interview with Variety, Wain and Showalter stated that they wrote a television pilot in 2003 for a Fox television series based on the film. Wain described the series as a "22-minute Fox sitcom with commercials and nothing Rated R, so it was a little bit odd." The pilot was not picked up for a series.

== Events ==
=== 10th anniversary event ===
On August 2, 2011, a 10th anniversary event was held at the Music Hall of Williamsburg in Brooklyn, hosted by David Wain, Michael Showalter and Michael Ian Black and produced by Marianne Ways. The event's highlights included in-character appearances of Janeane Garofalo (as Beth), Ken Marino (as Victor), Marisa Ryan (as Abby) and Judah Friedlander (as Ron); Appearances of Gideon Jacobs (who played Aaron), Gabriel Millman (who played Caped Boy) and Showalter as Alan Shemper; Samm Levine did an audio recording of Arty doing radio voice-over from camp; Marino and Ryan singing "Danny's Song" (in character); Showalter performing a set as Alan Shemper; A. D. Miles conducting an Inside the Actors Studio–style Q&A with a talking Can of Mixed Vegetables, which was voiced offstage by Jon Benjamin; Tapped bits by Amy Poehler (in character as Susie) and Paul Rudd, which was a re-creation of the cafeteria scene with Judd Apatow as Beth and Paul Rudd as Andy; and audition tapes for Bradley Cooper and the not-cast Naomi Watts (which gave Katie's "Andy is, like, cut. From marble." speech). A house band was playing songs from the film as interstitials. The event also had an interactive arts and crafts corner where attendees could make a 20-sided die necklace and friendship bracelets, a "Gournal", a composition book, where the attendees could sign in and a sweater-fondling contest.

=== Live radio play at SF Sketchfest ===
On January 21, 2012, a sold-out live radio play staged recreation of Wet Hot American Summer was held at the Marines' Memorial Theatre in San Francisco, CA. during SF Sketchfest. The show was adapted for the stage by Ben Acker and Ben Blacker, creators of Thrilling Adventure Hour, and produced by David Owen, Cole Stratton and Janet Varney. Reprising their roles from the original cast were, Paul Rudd, Amy Poehler, Michael Showalter, Michael Ian Black, Molly Shannon, Ken Marino, Joe Lo Truglio, Samm Levine, Marguerite Moreau and Chris Meloni. David Wain narrated the production. David Owen, SF Sketchfest cofounder, stated that they realized they were going to have a lot of great actors and comedians in town, doing other events at Sketchfest, so they should get them to be understudies. Joining the cast were David Cross (as Henry), Busy Philipps (as Beth), Andy Richter (as Ron), John Hodgman (as Keith), Gillian Jacobs (as Lindsay), Joshua Malina (as J.J.), Colin Hanks (as Gary), Marc Evan Jackson (as Ben), Bruce McCulloch (as Aaron), Jessi Klein (as Abby), Craig Cackowski (as Moose), Hal Lublin (as Melvin), Annie Savage (as various parts), Zandy Hartig (as Nurse Nancy) and Bobcat Goldthwait (as Can of Mixed Vegetables). Goldthwait was backstage right before the show, on his hands and knees making a fake can of vegetables mask to wear on his head.
