= Classic hits =

Radio format focusing on classic popular music

Classic hits is a radio format which generally includes songs from the top 40 music charts from the 1960s to the mid-2000s, with music from the 1980s serving as the core of the format. Music that was popularized by MTV in the early 1980s and the nostalgia behind it is a major driver to the format. It is considered the successor to the oldies format, a collection of top 40 songs from the late 1950s through the late 1970s that was once extremely popular in the United States and Canada. The term is sometimes incorrectly used as a synonym for the adult hits format, which uses a slightly newer music library stretching from all decades to the present with a major focus on 1990s and 2000s pop, rock and alternative songs. In addition, adult hits stations tend to have larger playlists, playing a given song only a few times per week, compared to the tighter libraries on classic hits stations. For example, KRTH, a classic hits station in Los Angeles, and KSPF, a classic hits station in Dallas, both play power songs up to 30 times a week or more, which is another differentiator compared to other formats that share songs with classic hits libraries.

The classic hits format saw growth in the 2010s, with stations like KRTH, WCBS-FM in New York, WLS-FM in Chicago, WROR-FM in Boston and Greatest Hits Radio in the UK having successful ratings with this model. Classic hits was named "format of the summer of 2018" by Nielsen Audio's research team emphasizing the huge popularity of the format. In addition, the Millennial generation is listening to this format in record numbers, according to a Nielsen report. As of December 2019, there are now over 1,100 classic hits stations in the United States, the largest amount in format history.

== History ==
=== Origins ===
The term "classic hits" is believed to have its birth at WZLX in Boston, when the station hired programming consultant Gary Guthrie to convert the station from adult contemporary to a format composed of the hipper tracks from the oldies format and album tracks from popular classic rock albums. The goal was to attract and magnetize people who were born in the 1950s and enjoyed the popular music hits of their 1960s and '70s adolescence, but did not favor the then-current heavy metal or top 40 music of the 1980s. These were people whose mindset was aging beyond album-oriented rock and top 40, yet were still either too young for or uninterested in "oldies" as then defined.

=== Contemporary definition ===
Until the mid-2000s, the term "classic hits" was used by stations that played the softer or more hit-oriented side of classic rock such as Milwaukee's WKLH. Today, there are a few stations that identify as classic hits, such as WROR-FM in Boston and WJJK in Indianapolis, but whose playlists have more in common with classic rock; most stations, including WKLH, continue to maintain its same format aged up to absorb music from the 80s to the early 2000s, but with alternate monickers to avoid comparison to the current version of the format.

The classic hits format as it is known today began to take shape in the mid 2000s when oldies radio stations started having audience and ratings issues. They believed that they could not be successful with the oldies format and needed to update the music and presentation to stay relevant in the 25–54 demographic on which advertising agencies base ad purchases. After several years of format transitions and changes, the industry needed a term that better defined the stations who were basing their libraries in the MTV era of music. Thus, the term classic hits was accepted by the radio community as the official name and recognized by Nielsen Audio as a format classification. In addition, many adult contemporary (AC) stations that had featured a large library of 1980s music began to phase it out as new artists like Adele, Pink, Bruno Mars, Maroon 5, and others became very popular, thus making these stations much more current oriented. This factor created a situation where artists like Madonna, George Michael, Michael Jackson, and Prince, who are considered major superstars, were no longer being played on AC stations. Most of these stations are now current-intensive, playing newer artists versus those from the 1980s which have aged out of the AC format.

The recent appeal to this format has introduced format flips in major markets, including the flip of WIAD, Washington D.C. from adult contemporary-formatted "Fresh-FM" to classic hits as "The Drive" in October 2018. Most of the current classic hits stations were simply slow evolutions from oldies, including WOGL in Philadelphia, WRBQ-FM in Tampa, KSPF in Dallas, and WOCL in Orlando, among many others. WOGL changed their slogan to "Nobody plays more 80s" whereas WRBQ-FM changed to "Hits of the 80s and more". Radio programmer Scott Shannon, the architect of the modern top 40 era at WHTZ (Z100) in New York during the 1980s, moved his morning show to WCBS-FM, bringing many of the 1980s-style radio formats to the station. Dallas-based JAM Creative Productions, a major producer of radio station jingles in the 1980s, created an updated jingle package for stations that moved to a classic hits presentation. Jingles in the CBS-FM update package include cuts from the popular "Flame Thrower" and "Warp Factor" packages made famous by WHTZ in the 1980s.

== Musical definition ==
Today's classic hits format is a representation of the variety of music types found on the radio in the 1980s including these core artists. These were a few examples that were more commonly used on most classic hits stations.

Rock:

- Bon Jovi
- Def Leppard
- Foreigner
- Guns N' Roses
- Journey
- Bruce Springsteen
- Golden Earring

Alternative and new wave:

- David Bowie
- Depeche Mode
- The Police
- Simple Minds
- U2

Pop:

- Hall & Oates
- Elton John
- Billy Joel
- Cyndi Lauper
- Madonna
- Wham!

R&B and dance:

- Earth, Wind & Fire
- Whitney Houston
- Michael Jackson
- Prince
- Lionel Richie

Songs from the mid- to late 1970s which had an influence on the MTV generation from artists such as Queen, Foreigner, Elton John, and the Bee Gees are still featured on many of these stations as the oldest part of the library. Additionally, stations have started to play songs from the 1990s and 2000s that have appeal to this audience such as "Linger" by The Cranberries and Uncle Kracker's version of "Drift Away", along with later releases by artists that were successful in the 1980s, such as U2 and Michael Jackson. By the mid-2020s, more songs from the turn of the millennium or later have increasingly been incorporated into the format, including hip hop, a genre of music that had previously been exceptionally rare.

Together, all of these variations of musical genres still have mass appeal due to the origins of radio stations that played them together when they were hits. Similar to the philosophy with oldies radio, most of the music is upbeat and edgy. While these music types can be found in other formats, what makes this format unique is the variety of genres being played together on one station as a decade-based collection, as opposed to a single style of music.

== Resurgence of 1980s music ==
There are theories about why the music of the 1980s continues to be popular, especially to younger generations such as Millennials. The advent of music in video games such as the Grand Theft Auto, Rock Band, and Guitar Hero series introduced younger audiences to 1980s songs from artists such as The Police, Queen, Duran Duran, The Cars, R.E.M., Billy Joel, and hundreds of others.

Another theory includes TV shows and movies on Netflix and other streaming video services that are set in the 1980s and feature music from that era. Examples include Netflix's popular series Stranger Things (whose soundtrack features songs from Cyndi Lauper and Toto), Wet Hot American Summer, Glow, and The Goldbergs on ABC. Movies with box office success that are set in the 1980s have also been contributed to the popularity of the music of that era, including Guardians of the Galaxy, The Wedding Singer, Hot Tub Time Machine, and Ready Player One.

Studies suggesting that millennials prefer older music have also been published with theories regarding a major shift in radio programming. According to these reports, the 1970s and 1980s were the last decades that a typical top 40 radio station played all music types; by the 1990s, top 40 began splintering into various genres such as rap and alternative rock, and each station was reformatted to focus on one type of music. Millennials also grew up in an era when music radio formats featuring older music were becoming widespread, something that was not necessarily true for Generation X; much of the classic hits library was included in adult-contemporary stations of the era, while classic rock was only beginning to split from more modern rock stations in the late 1980s, around the same time oldies emerged as a standalone format.

During the late 2010s, many stations in the adult contemporary, adult R&B, and alternative formats either reduced or eliminated songs from the 1970s and 1980s in favor of new artists and more current-based music rotations. This created a void in which gold-based music was not being played on radio in certain markets, thus creating a new opportunity for classic hits stations.

1980s music has retained popularity in the classic hits format for longer than would otherwise be suggested given the history of the format, which would have been centered in the 1990s by the mid-2020s if the standard of using 25 to 35 year old songs were to be maintained. A particular gap is encountered among the music of the 1990s, much of which is difficult to fit into the format because contemporary hit radio of the era was fractured and lacked enough songs with enduring appeal or an ideal sound to fit into a classic hits playlist. 1970s music likewise has retained a substantial portion of the classic hits music library (approximately 10% of the 100 most-played songs as of 2025, though none in the top 50), due in part to changing methods of music rediscovery (such as social media) that give older music more opportunities to remain culturally relevant; the prevalence of 1970s music varies widely by station.
