= Wet Hot American Summer: First Day of Camp =

2015 American comedy television miniseries

- Genre: Comedy; Satire
- Created by: Michael Showalter; David Wain
- Based on: Wet Hot American Summer by David Wain and Michael Showalter
- Written by: Michael Showalter; David Wain; Christina Lee
- Directed by: David Wain
- Starring: H. Jon Benjamin; Michael Ian Black; Bradley Cooper; Janeane Garofalo; Nina Hellman; Joe Lo Truglio; Ken Marino; A. D. Miles; Marguerite Moreau; Zak Orth; Amy Poehler; Paul Rudd; Michael Showalter; Elizabeth Banks; Christopher Meloni; Marisa Ryan; Molly Shannon; Judah Friedlander; Kevin Sussman; David Hyde Pierce
- Opening theme: "Jane" by Jefferson Starship
- Country of origin: United States
- Original language: English
- No. of episodes: 8

Production
- Executive producers: Michael Showalter; David Wain; Jonathan Stern; Peter Principato; Howard Bernstein
- Cinematography: Kevin Atkinson
- Camera setup: Single-camera
- Running time: 27–30 minutes
- Production companies: Showalter Wain; Abominable Pictures; Principato-Young Entertainment; Netflix Originals

Original release
- Network: Netflix
- Release: July 31, 2015

Related
- Wet Hot American Summer: Ten Years Later (2017)

Wet Hot American Summer: First Day of Camp is an American satirical comedy television miniseries written by David Wain and Michael Showalter, and directed by Wain. First Day of Camp is the second installment in the Wet Hot American Summer franchise. The eight-episode Netflix series is a prequel to Wain's 2001 film Wet Hot American Summer, a parody of teen sex comedies which has since developed a cult following. Although many of the original film's ensemble cast have gone on to high-profile work, all of the then-adult actors returned for this series, playing even younger versions of their original roles. The episodes were released for online viewing at the end of July 2015.

== Cast and characters ==
=== Returning cast from the film (in alphabetical order) ===
- Elizabeth Banks as Lindsay
- H. Jon Benjamin as Mitch/Can of Mixed Vegetables
- Michael Ian Black as McKinley
- Bradley Cooper as Ben
- Judah Friedlander as Ron Von Kleinenstein
- Janeane Garofalo as Beth
- Nina Hellman as Nancy
- Joe Lo Truglio as Neil
- Ken Marino as Victor
- Christopher Meloni as Gene Jenkinson/Jonas Jurgenson
- A. D. Miles as Gary
- Marguerite Moreau as Katie
- Zak Orth as J.J.
- David Hyde Pierce as Assoc. Prof. Henry Neumann
- Amy Poehler as Susie
- Paul Rudd as Andy
- Marisa Ryan as Abby
- Molly Shannon as Gail
- Michael Showalter as Coop
  - Showalter also portrays U.S. President Ronald Reagan
- Kevin Sussman as Steve

=== New cast ===
- Jason Schwartzman as Greg, Boys' Head Counselor
- Lake Bell as Donna Berman, Coop's love interest
- David Bloom as Kevin, a kid at the camp
- Thomas Barbusca as Drew, Kevin's nemesis
- George Dalton as Arty "The Beekeeper" Solomon
  - Samm Levine as the voice of Arty
- Michael Blaiklock as Danny
- David Wain as Yaron, an Israeli counselor
- John Slattery as Claude Dumet, a renowned Broadway actor-director
- Michaela Watkins as Rhonda, a professional choreographer
- Josh Charles as Blake, Camp Tigerclaw counselor and Katie's boyfriend
- Rich Sommer as Graham, one of Blake's cronies
- Eric Nenninger as Warner, one of Blake's cronies
- Hailey Sole as Amy, Kevin's love interest
- Chris Pine as Eric, a reclusive musician
- Jon Hamm as The Falcon, a hired assassin
- Randall Park as Jeff, a city hall records clerk falls in love with Gail
- Michael Cera as Jim Stansel, Beth and Greg's lawyer
- Kristen Wiig as Courtney, a snobby Camp Tigerclaw counselor

=== Guest appearances ===
- Jordan Peele as Alan, Lindsay's boss
- Paul Scheer as Dave, Lindsay's colleague
- Jayma Mays as Jessica, Lindsay's colleague
- "Weird Al" Yankovic as Jackie Brazen, a famous hypnotist
- Beth Dover as Shari, Neil's high school sweetheart
- John Early as Logan St. Bogan
- Bruce Greenwood as Bill Martinson, powerful lawyer
- Rob Huebel as Brodfard Gilroy, Henry's rival
- Richard Schiff as Dean Fairchild, Henry's superior

== Episodes ==
No.	Title	Directed by	Written by	Original release date
1	"Campers Arrive"	David Wain	Michael Showalter & David Wain	July 31, 2015
It's the first morning at Camp Firewood, and the counselors are preparing for the arrival of the new campers. Coop is insistent that Donna, another counselor, is his girlfriend, and he's excited to see her. Ben and Susie are a couple, despite not being happy together; they are excited to put on the camp's theater production and hire veteran actor Claude Dumet for help. Katie is dating Blake at the preppy Camp Tigerclaw, who spies on her and is jealous when he sees Andy flirt with her. In the woods, men are seen dumping toxic chemicals.
2	"Lunch"	David Wain	Michael Showalter & David Wain	July 31, 2015
Lindsay, a journalist, goes undercover in the camp to report about it. She learns there is a mysterious cabin and a story about a former camper turned rockstar that supposedly disappeared and has been living there ever since. Greg discovers the toxic dumping and that the camp has been in financial trouble. He and Beth confront Mitch, who falls into the toxic waste and appears to die, but tells them to follow the code. Coop becomes jealous when Donna becomes enamored with another counselor at the camp.
3	"Activities"	David Wain	Michael Showalter	July 31, 2015
Beth and Greg realize that there may be a conspiracy for the hidden toxic waste; they approach the Jonas, the camp cook who is marrying Gail, and confront him about his service in the Vietnam War. They unlock repressed memories and find the code that will allow them to uncover the truth about the toxic waste; they find that Mitch did not die, but has transformed into a can of vegetables. Donna gives Coop an instrument, which he believes is a personal gift; he learns that she had many gifts for people at the camp. Andy continues to flirt with Katie, which she rejects, but it makes Blake jealous. Beth and Greg get help from Steve, a computer hacker to retrieve government records revealing high-level government involvement, but this causes U.S. President Ronald Reagan to order their assassination.
4	"Auditions"	David Wain	Michael Showalter	July 31, 2015
Claude helps Susie find new leads for the musical. Gail tries to discover the truth about Jonas. The Falcon lands.
5	"Dinner"	David Wain	Michael Showalter & Christina Lee	July 31, 2015
Susie, Claude, Andy and Katie get closer during the evening meal. Jonas overreacts when Victor prank-calls him. Beth and Greg hire a lawyer.
6	"Electro/City"	David Wain	Michael Showalter & David Wain	July 31, 2015
Lives change dramatically during the performance of the staff musical "Electro-City." Greg and Beth's lawsuit goes to trial.
7	"Staff Party"	David Wain	Michael Showalter	July 31, 2015
Victor and Coop discover that sex is a lot more complicated than they thought. Lindsay has to file her article. Andy and Katie have a moment of truth.
8	"Day Is Done"	David Wain	Michael Showalter & David Wain	July 31, 2015
While Beth and Gene fight to save the camp from government forces, Andy and the other counselors take on their Camp Tiger Claw rivals.

== Production ==
After years of speculation and reports on a possible sequel to Wet Hot American Summer, shooting began on the miniseries in January 2015. The entire adult cast of the film returned in the same roles. Much of the series was shot in Los Angeles. Working around the availability of the cast members, many of whom had seen a significant rise in stardom since the original film, was difficult; some sources report that Bradley Cooper, who plays Ben, had to shoot all of his scenes in one day, although star and co-writer Michael Showalter has since denied this claim.

Along with the series, a making-of documentary on Wet Hot American Summer, titled Hurricane of Fun: The Making of Wet Hot, was released on Netflix on July 24, 2015, consisting of behind the scenes interviews and footage shot during the filming of the movie.

== Sequel ==
On April 27, 2016, it was announced that Netflix ordered a follow-up series entitled Wet Hot American Summer: Ten Years Later, set ten years after the events of the film. The series consists of eight episodes, and was released on August 4, 2017.

== Reception ==
Wet Hot American Summer: First Day of Camp received positive reviews from critics. On Rotten Tomatoes, the series has a score of 92%, based on 53 reviews, with an average rating of 7.44/10. The site's critical consensus reads, "Wet Hot American Summer: First Day of Camp offers more of the same goofy hijinks that fans of the cult classic crave, but outsiders might not be quite as enamored." On Metacritic, the series holds a score of 74 out of 100, based on 23 critics, indicating "generally favorable reviews".

For the 6th Critics' Choice Television Awards, John Slattery was nominated for Best Guest Performer in a Comedy Series.
