= Michael Showalter =

American comedian, actor, and filmmaker (born 1970)

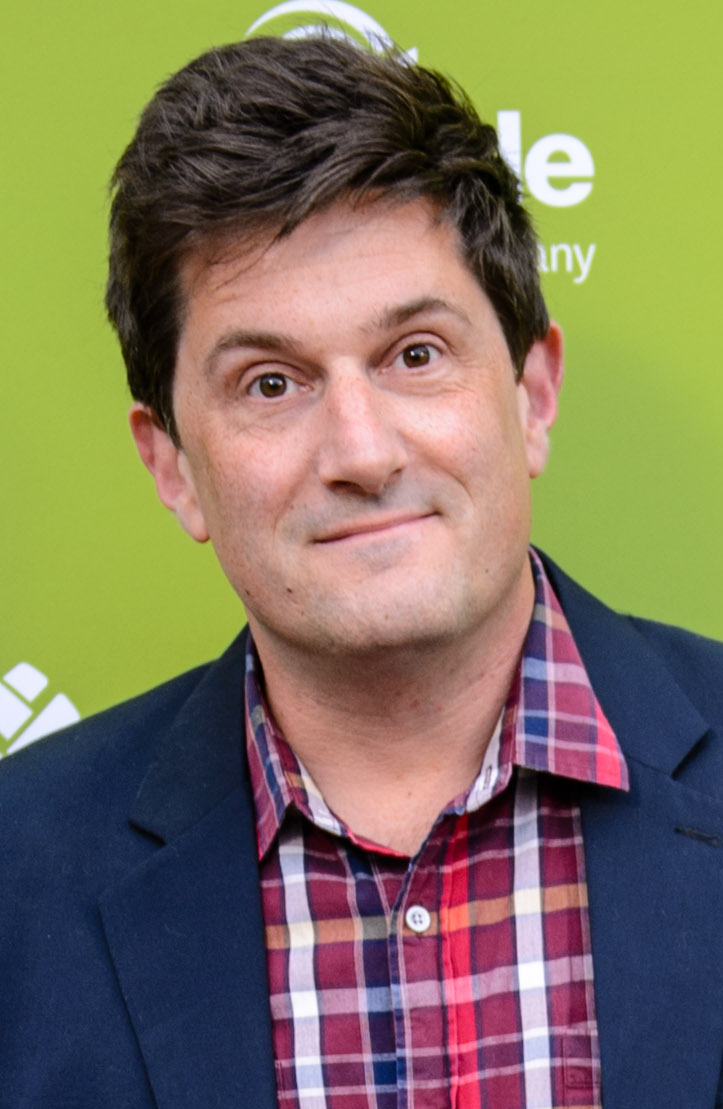
- Michael Showalter at the 2015 Montclair Film Festival
- Born: June 17, 1970 (age 56); Princeton, New Jersey, U.S.
- Other name: Mikey S
- Education: Brown University
- Spouse: Anne Kalin Ellis (m. 2011)
- Children: 2

Comedy career
- Years active: 1992–present
- Medium: Film, television
- Genres: Surreal comedy, improvisational comedy, farce, dark comedy, stand-up comedy, alternative comedy, sketch comedy, anti-humor, cringe comedy, physical comedy, satire / parody

Michael Showalter (born June 17, 1970) is an American actor, comedian and filmmaker. He first achieved recognition as a cast member on MTV's The State, which aired from 1993 to 1995. Along with David Wain, Showalter created the Wet Hot American Summer franchise, with Showalter co-writing and starring in Wet Hot American Summer (2001) and the Netflix series. Showalter wrote and directed The Baxter (2005), in which he starred with Michelle Williams, Justin Theroux, and Elizabeth Banks. Both films featured many of his co-stars from The State, and so do several of his other projects.

Showalter is also a co-creator, co-producer, actor, and writer for the TV series Search Party. He directed the Oscar-nominated films The Big Sick (2017) and The Eyes of Tammy Faye (2021), as well as the critically acclaimed series The Dropout.

== Early life ==
Showalter was born in Princeton, New Jersey, the son of Elaine Showalter (née Cottler), an author, feminist literary critic, and professor of English, and English Showalter, a Yale-educated professor of 18th century French literature. His father is Episcopalian and his mother is Jewish. He has one older sister, Vinca Showalter LaFleur, a professional speechwriter. He attended Princeton High School. For five years, Showalter shared an apartment with his friend, comedian and actress Andrea Rosen.

== Career ==
Showalter began his undergraduate studies at New York University, where he joined the sketch comedy group The New Group. He transferred to and graduated from Brown University, where he joined the improv comedy troupe IMPROVidence. After he completed college, The New Group changed its name to The State and began creating video shorts for an MTV show called You Wrote It, You Watch It, hosted by Jon Stewart. The comedy troupe then got its own sketch comedy TV series, The State, which aired for two years on MTV.

Showalter has also had several smaller roles in movies and TV shows. He played Ron Parker, the arrogant host of Cheap Seats, on ESPN Classic in the pilot episode. However, after a bookcase fell on Showalter's character, tape librarians (and brothers) Randy and Jason Sklar took over the hosting duties. Showalter spent a brief time as a correspondent on The Daily Show (1996). He is also one half of The Doilies, an acoustic comedy band, in which he sings lead vocals opposite guitarist Zak Orth. In 2005 he wrote, directed and starred in the film The Baxter.

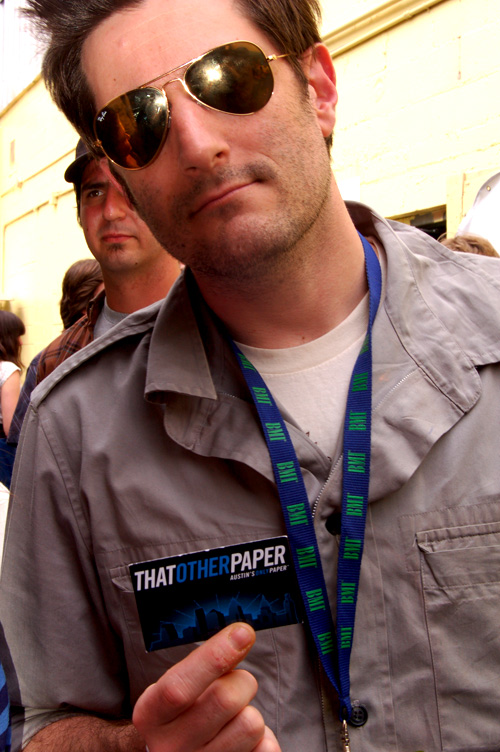
Showalter in 2007

Showalter is the host of The Michael Showalter Showalter, an original Internet series on Collegehumor.com which premiered January 16, 2007. His first guest was comedian Zach Galifianakis. Other guests have included David Cross, Michael Ian Black, Paul Rudd, David Wain, Andy Samberg, Michael Cera, and Mike Birbiglia. In the fall and winter of 2006, Showalter toured the US with frequent collaborator Michael Ian Black. In March 2007 Showalter briefly toured as the opening act for Janeane Garofalo. The Ten reunites him with frequent collaborators from The State.

Showalter signed with JDub Records, a non-profit record label, in June 2007. He released his first stand-up CD titled Sandwiches & Cats in November 2007. He teaches screenwriting at New York University's Graduate Film School.

Showalter teamed up once more with Michael Ian Black in the Comedy Central series Michael and Michael Have Issues, which premiered in July 2009. The show detailed the two Michaels' trials and tribulations as they create a television series. They confirmed the series' cancellation in early 2010.

In an interview with The Rumpus in February 2009, Showalter talked about a memoir he is working on. "I am writing an 'important' memoir about not being able to write an important memoir. It winds up being kind of a novel-length comedic essay on insecurity and procrastination." The book, Mr. Funny Pants, was published in February 2011.

He appeared twice on the NBC drama Law & Order: in the episode "Endurance", which aired on October 18, 2000, and in the episode "Reality Bites", which aired on October 16, 2009.

Showalter also appeared in a series of commercials advertising the Toyota Yaris, starting in late 2011.

In 2013 Showalter and Michael Ian Black launched a podcast called "Topics" in which the duo discuss evergreen topics in a serious manner.

Showalter was a writer on the ABC sitcom Super Fun Night.

In 2014, Showalter co-wrote with David Wain They Came Together. Wain and Showalter then co-wrote the eight-episode Netflix prequel Wet Hot American Summer: First Day of Camp based on the 2001 film with almost the entire cast of the original film returning. Showalter himself appeared as Gerald "Coop" Cooperberg and President Ronald Reagan in the series. The series premiered on July 31, 2015, and was more well received by critics. He also co-wrote and starred in the Netflix sequel Wet Hot American Summer: Ten Years Later which premiered in 2017.

In 2015 his film Hello, My Name Is Doris debuted at SXSW, where it was acquired by Roadside Attractions. It was released in the United States in March 2016, and received critical acclaim.

His 2017 film The Big Sick starred Kumail Nanjiani, Zoe Kazan, Holly Hunter and Ray Romano. It saw a wide theatrical release and had an overwhelmingly positive 98% fresh rating on Rotten Tomatoes, and was nominated for the Academy Award for Best Original Screenplay.

Showalter next directed the 2020 film The Lovebirds, starring Kumail Nanjiani of The Big Sick, along with Issa Rae, Anna Camp and Paul Sparks. The film was scheduled for theatrical release in the United States on April 3, 2020, however due to the worldwide COVID-19 pandemic its theatrical release was cancelled, and it premiered on Netflix on May 22, 2020. In 2021, he signed an overall deal with HBO Max.

Showalter directed the 2025 Amazon MGM holiday comedy, Oh. What. Fun., starring Michelle Pfeiffer.

Showalter is set to direct an untitled movie inspired by Cyrano de Bergerac, written by Andrea Seigel.

== Personal life ==
Showalter married Anne Kalin Ellis on January 16, 2011, in New York. The couple has twin daughters, born in 2014 and two French Bulldogs who were born in 2025.

== Filmography ==
=== Film ===
| Year | Title | Director | Producer | Writer |
|---|---|---|---|---|
| 2001 | Wet Hot American Summer | No | Co-producer | Yes |
| 2002 | Stella shorts | Yes | No | Yes |
| 2005 | The Baxter | Yes | No | Yes |
| 2014 | They Came Together | No | Yes | Yes |
| 2015 | Hello, My Name Is Doris | Yes | Executive | Yes |
| 2017 | The Big Sick | Yes | No | No |
| 2020 | The Lovebirds | Yes | Executive | No |
| 2021 | The Eyes of Tammy Faye | Yes | No | No |
| 2022 | Spoiler Alert | Yes | Yes | No |
| 2024 | The Idea of You | Yes | Yes | Yes |
| 2025 | Oh. What. Fun. | Yes | Yes | Yes |
| 2026 | Verity | Yes | Yes | No |

Acting roles

| Year | Title | Role | Notes |
|---|---|---|---|
| 1996 | Tick | Clifford | Short film |
| 2001 | Wet Hot American Summer | Gerald "Coop" Cooperberg / Alan Shemper | |
| 2001 | Kissing Jessica Stein | Stephen | |
| 2002 | Signs | Lionel Prichard | |
| 2002 | Stella shorts | Michael | |
| 2002 | Operation Midnight Climax | Chip | |
| 2004 | Hair High | Wally | Voice role |
| 2005 | The Baxter | Elliot Sherman | |
| 2006 | Griffin & Phoenix | Terry's Fiancé | |
| 2007 | The Ten | Police Lt. Flarn Bleern | |
| 2007 | Reno 911!: Miami | Paul | |
| 2008 | Birthday | Michael | Short film |
| 2013 | Bum Future | Fred | Short film |
| 2014 | Two Night Stand | Rick Raines | |

=== Television ===
| Year | Title | Director | Writer | Executive Producer | Creator | Notes |
|---|---|---|---|---|---|---|
| 1992–1993 | You Wrote It, You Watch It | No | Yes | No | No | |
| 1993–1995 | The State | No | Yes | No | Yes | 27 episodes |
| 1995 | The State's 43rd Annual All-Star Halloween Special | No | Yes | No | No | TV special |
| 1999 | 1999 MTV Movie Awards | No | Yes | No | No | TV special |
| 1999 | Random Play | No | Uncredited | No | No | Additional writer; 3 episodes |
| 2003–2005 | The Wrong Coast | No | Yes | No | No | |
| 2005 | Stella | No | Yes | Yes | Yes | Wrote 10 episodes |
| 2008 | The Michael Showalter Showalter | No | No | Yes | Yes | |
| 2009 | Michael & Michael Have Issues | Yes | Yes | Yes | Yes | Directed 3 episodes |
| 2013 | You're Whole | Yes | No | No | No | 7 episodes |
| 2013–2014 | Super Fun Night | No | Yes | No | No | 2 episodes |
| 2013–2014 | Newsreaders | No | Yes | No | No | 2 episodes |
| 2015 | Wet Hot American Summer: First Day of Camp | No | Yes | Yes | Yes | Mini-series |
| 2015–2016 | Childrens Hospital | No | Yes | No | No | 4 episodes |
| 2016–2018 | Love | Yes | No | No | No | 3 episodes |
| 2016 | Giles Vanderhoot | Yes | Yes | Yes | No | TV movie |
| 2016–2019 | Grace and Frankie | Yes | No | No | No | 2 episodes |
| 2016–2022 | Search Party | Yes | Yes | Yes | Yes | Directed 3 episodes |
| 2017 | Wet Hot American Summer: Ten Years Later | No | Yes | Yes | Yes | Mini-series |
| 2019 | In the Dark | Yes | No | No | No | Episode: "Pilot" |
| 2019 | Ray Romano Right Here, Around the Corner | Yes | No | No | No | TV special documentary |
| 2021 | The Shrink Next Door | Yes | No | Yes | No | Directed 4 episodes |
| 2022 | The Dropout | Yes | No | Yes | No | Mini-series; Directed 4 episodes |
| 2022 | I Love That for You | Yes | No | Yes | No | |
| 2025 | Happy Face | Yes | No | Yes | No | |
| 2024 | The Pradeeps of Pittsburgh | Yes | No | Yes | No | Post-production |
| TBA | The Off Weeks | Yes | No | Yes | No | Upcoming miniseries |

Acting roles

| Year | Title | Role | Notes |
|---|---|---|---|
| 1992–1993 | You Wrote It, You Watch It | Various characters | |
| 1993–1995 | The State | Various characters | 27 episodes |
| 1995 | The State's 43rd Annual All-Star Halloween Special | Various characters | TV special |
| 1997 | Apartment 2F | Phil | 4 episodes |
| 1999 | Random Play | Various characters | 3 episodes |
| 2000 | Buzz Lightyear of Star Command | Plasma Boy (voice) | Episode: "The Plasma Monster" |
| 2000, 2009 | Law & Order | Artie Kramer / Allen Gee | 2 episodes |
| 2003 | Sex and the City | Billy | Episode: "The Post-It Always Sticks Twice" |
| 2004–2006 | Cheap Seats | Ron Parker | 6 episodes |
| 2005 | Stella | Michael | 10 episodes |
| 2008 | Wainy Days | Landon | Episode: "Molly" |
| 2008 | The Michael Showalter Showalter | Host | 10 episodes |
| 2009 | Michael & Michael Have Issues | Himself | 7 episodes |
| 2012 | Late Night with Jimmy Fallon | Gordon Scheer | Uncredited |
| 2013 | You're Whole | Dr. Robert Wexler | Episode "Droppin' the 'G'/Ancient Egypt/Puffy Paints" |
| 2013 | Inside Amy Schumer | Steve | Episode: "Bad Decisions" |
| 2014 | Bob's Burgers | Ethan (voice) | Episode: "The Kids Rob a Train" |
| 2014 | Comedy Bang! Bang! | Clyde Bryllis | Episode: "Nick Offerman Wears a Green Flannel Shirt & Brown Boots" |
| 2015 | Wet Hot American Summer: First Day of Camp | Coop / President Reagan | Mini-series; 8 episodes |
| 2015 | Jammers | Jeremy / Cool Guy / Ol' Drippy (voice) | TV short |
| 2015 | The Grinder | Sandy Malmuth | Episode: "Dedicating This One to the Crew" |
| 2015–2016 | Childrens Hospital | Nils Vildervaan | 2 episodes |
| 2016 | Giles Vanderhoot | Giles Vanderhoot | TV movie |
| 2016 | American Dad! | Mark (voice) | Episode: "Bahama Mama" |
| 2016–2017 | Search Party | Max | 5 episodes |
| 2017 | Wet Hot American Summer: Ten Years Later | Coop / President Reagan | Mini-series; 8 episodes |
| 2017 | 9JKL | Walter Michaelson | Episode: "Set Visit" |
| 2018 | Sugar Rush | Himself (guest judge) | Episode: "Camp Sugar Rush" |
