= Wet Hot American Summer =

2001 American comedy film

- Theatrical release poster
- Directed by: David Wain
- Written by: David Wain; Michael Showalter
- Produced by: Howard Bernstein
- Starring: Janeane Garofalo; David Hyde Pierce; Molly Shannon; Paul Rudd; Christopher Meloni; Michael Showalter; Marguerite Moreau; Ken Marino; Michael Ian Black; Zak Orth; A. D. Miles; Amy Poehler; Bradley Cooper; Marisa Ryan; Kevin Sussman; Joe Lo Truglio; Elizabeth Banks
- Cinematography: Ben Weinstein
- Edited by: Meg Reticker
- Music by: Theodore Shapiro; Craig Wedren
- Production companies: Eureka Pictures; North Coast Group
- Distributed by: USA Films
- Release dates: January 23, 2001 (Sundance); July 27, 2001 (United States)
- Running time: 92 minutes
- Country: United States
- Language: English
- Budget: $1.8 million
- Box office: $547,491

Wet Hot American Summer is a 2001 American satirical comedy film directed by David Wain from a screenplay written by Wain and Michael Showalter. The film stars an ensemble cast that includes Showalter, Janeane Garofalo, David Hyde Pierce, Molly Shannon, Paul Rudd, Christopher Meloni, Marguerite Moreau, Ken Marino, Michael Ian Black, Zak Orth, A. D. Miles, Amy Poehler, Bradley Cooper (in his film debut), Marisa Ryan, Kevin Sussman, Joe Lo Truglio, and Elizabeth Banks.

It takes place during the last full day at a fictional summer camp in 1981, and spoofs the sex comedies aimed at teen audiences of that era.

The film was a critical and commercial failure, but it has since developed a cult following, and many of its cast members have gone on to high-profile work. Netflix revived the franchise with the release of Wet Hot American Summer: First Day of Camp, an eight-episode prequel series starring most of the film's original cast, on July 31, 2015; and Wet Hot American Summer: Ten Years Later, an eight-episode sequel series, on August 4, 2017.

== Plot ==
The film shows the last day of the 1981 summer camp Camp Firewood, located near Waterville, Maine, concentrating on the experiences of the camp counselors, most of whom are around 16. The interleaved story threads meet in the evening at the camp talent show:

Cook Gene, a Vietnam War veteran, clumsily tries to hide his various sexual fetishes. After being encouraged by a talking can of vegetables, he proudly admits them to the campers and counselors in front of the packed food hall, to great applause.

Zealous drama instructors Ben and Susie organize a talent show to be held on the last evening. Ben is in love with counselor McKinley. They have passionate sex and are later symbolically married by Beth in a ceremony by the lake. Beth forces Ben and Susie to give the last slot of their talent show to strange outsider Steve, who surprises everyone when, during his time on stage, an intense storm breaks out inside and outside the venue, created with the power of his mind. He receives a wild ovation.

Counselor Coop is secretly in love with counselor Katie, but she is dating Andy, who is obnoxious and inconsiderate and cheats on her with Lindsay. Katie decides to find a girl for Coop. When they spend time together during the day, Katie develops feelings for him. Eventually they kiss, but Katie returns to Andy and tells Coop they made a mistake.

A devastated Coop is found by Gene, who performs a rigorous training regimen with him. A newly buff Coop impresses Katie at the talent show and she declares her love for him. But when both bid farewell the next morning, she explains that she has returned to Andy again, even though she knows he is a terrible boyfriend, because he is very attractive and she is only interested in sex.

Camp director Beth is attracted to Henry, an associate professor of astrophysics who vacations near the camp. She asks him to come over and teach the campers about space. At first rudely rejecting her, he changes his mind and does science projects with a group of nerdy children, bonding with them and getting closer to Beth.

Henry and the children discover that a piece of Skylab will deorbit that evening and will probably impact the camp. They build a contraption to pinpoint the precise location: the talent show venue. Henry thinks he can modify the machine so that it can influence the path of the space debris. After he and the children use the modified machine near the talent show during the storm, the debris lands harmlessly on the grass.

Counselor Victor tries to give the impression that he is a ladies man, but is secretly a virgin. He is promised sex by the promiscuous Abby this night, but is told by Beth to go on a rafting trip with several campers and Neil. He abandons them at the river, steals the van and tries to return to Abby. He crashes the van, but reaches the camp on foot in the evening, where Abby has forgotten about him. When Neil and the children get lost on the river, he abandons them on the raft to look for Victor. He finds him at the camp and brings him back to the river, just in time to save the children.

Arts and crafts instructor Gail has a nervous breakdown during class. The children help her, during which she admits that she is not yet over her ex-husband Ron. With the help of the children, especially Aaron, she finds the courage to reject Ron when he arrives during the talent show and asks her to come back to him. The next morning, Gail and Aaron declare their love for each other.

== Cast ==
- Janeane Garofalo as Beth
- David Hyde Pierce as Professor Henry Newman
- Molly Shannon as Gail von Kleinenstein
- Paul Rudd as Andy Flechner
- Christopher Meloni as Gene
- Michael Showalter as Gerald "Coop" Cooperberg/Alan Shemper
- Marguerite Moreau as Katie Finnerty
- Ken Marino as Victor Pulak
- Michael Ian Black as McKinley Dozen
- Zak Orth as J.J.
- A. D. Miles as Gary
- Nina Hellman as Nancy
- Amy Poehler as Susie
- Bradley Cooper as Ben
- Marisa Ryan as Abby Bernstein
- Kevin Sussman as Steve
- Elizabeth Banks as Lindsay Handelman
- Joe Lo Truglio as Neil
- Judah Friedlander as Ron von Kleinenstein
- H. Jon Benjamin as Can of Mixed Vegetables
- Donna Mitchell as Gene's Wife

== Production ==
=== Background ===
Wet Hot American Summer is based on the experiences Wain had while attending Jewish camps, particularly Camp Wise in Claridon Township, Ohio and Camp Modin in Canaan, Maine. Showalter also drew on his experiences he had at Camp Mohawk in the Berkshires in Cheshire, Massachusetts. During one scene, the counselors take a trip into Waterville, Maine, which is not far from the camp. It is also a parody of, and homage to, other films about summer camp, including Meatballs (1979), Little Darlings (1980), Sleepaway Camp (1983), and Indian Summer (1993). According to Wain, they wanted to make a film structured like the films Nashville, Dazed and Confused and Do the Right Thing—"films that take place in one contained time period that have lots of different characters."

=== Development ===
The film's financing took three years to assemble; in a June 2011 interview, Wain revealed the film's budget was $1.8 million; he noted that during the 2001 Sundance Film Festival, the film had been promoted as costing $5 million, in an attempt to attract a better offer from a distributor. Because of the film's relatively small budget, the cast was paid very little; Paul Rudd has stated that he is uncertain that he received any compensation at all for the film.

=== Filming ===
Principal photography lasted 28 days in May 2000, and, according to director David Wain, it rained on every day of shooting. Exterior shots were filmed when possible, sometimes under covers or umbrellas, but some scenes were moved indoors instead. In many interior scenes, rain seen outside turns into sun as soon as characters step outside. Due to the cold, the actors' breath can be seen in some outdoor scenes. The film was shot at Camp Towanda in Honesdale, Pennsylvania.

=== Music ===
As the film is set in the early 1980s, the film's soundtrack features songs from many popular bands of the era, most notably Jefferson Starship, Rick Springfield, Loverboy, and Kiss.

== Release ==
=== Theatrical ===
Wet Hot American Summer premiered at the 2001 Sundance Film Festival, where it was screened four times to sold-out crowds, though it failed to attract a distributor. Months later, USA Films offered the filmmakers $100,000 for the film, with virtually no participation for the filmmakers, an offer the film's investors accepted. It premiered in New York City on July 27, 2001, then received a limited theatrical release in fewer than 30 cities.

=== Home media ===
The film was released in both VHS and DVD formats on January 15, 2002 by USA Home Entertainment. In 2011, Wain tried to convince Universal Studios to prepare either a 10th anniversary home video re-release with extra features, or a Blu-ray release, but Universal rejected the ideas. The film was released on Blu-ray on May 12, 2015.

== Reception ==
Wet Hot American Summer received mostly negative reviews from critics. Rotten Tomatoes gives the film a rating of 39%, based on 77 reviews, with an average rating of 4.85/10. The website's critical consensus reads, "Wet Hot American Summer's incredibly talented cast is too often outmatched by a deeply silly script that misses its targets at least as often as it skewers them." Metacritic gives the film a score of 42 out of 100, based on 24 critics, indicating "mixed or average reviews".

Roger Ebert rated the film with one star out of four. His review took the form of a tongue-in-cheek parody of Allan Sherman's "Hello Muddah, Hello Fadduh".

In contrast, Entertainment Weekly's Owen Gleiberman awarded the film an "A", and named it as one of the ten best films of the year. Newsweek's David Ansen also lauded it, calling it a "gloriously silly romp" that "made me laugh harder than any other movie this summer. Make that this year." The film has gone on to achieve a cult following.

Actress Kristen Bell stated on NPR on September 2, 2012, that Wet Hot American Summer was her favorite film, having watched it "hundreds of times." NPR host Jesse Thorn said on the April 29, 2014 episode of Bullseye:

When someone has an open enough heart to accept this silliness—and that's what it's about for me, an open heart—if someone's heart is open to Wet Hot American Summer, they love it. And that's when I know that me and them, we've got an unbreakable bond. Together forever. Like camp counselors.

In July 2025, it was one of the films voted for the "Readers' Choice" edition of The New York Times' list of "The 100 Best Movies of the 21st Century," finishing at number 285.

== Follow-ups ==
The film is followed by two Netflix series, with one serving as a prequel and one as a sequel. The prequel, First Day of Camp, was released on July 31, 2015, while the sequel, Ten Years Later, was released on August 4, 2017.

An original graphic novel titled Wet Hot American Summer was released on November 20, 2018. It was written by Christopher Hastings and illustrated by Noah Hayes.

== Legacy ==
The professional wrestler Orange Cassidy, who has the gimmick of a slacker character, is largely based on Paul Rudd's portrayal of Andy in the film, even going as far as to have "Jane" by Jefferson Starship (which is used in the film's opening credits) as his entrance music.

=== Anniversary celebrations ===
Events were held around the country to celebrate the film's 10-year anniversary in 2011 and 2012, including a screening of the film in Boston, an art show in Santa Monica of works inspired by the film, with a reception hosted by Wain, a screening at the Los Angeles Film School with a Q&A with Wain, a 10th anniversary celebration event with the members of Stella in Brooklyn, and a reading of the script at the San Francisco Comedy Festival, with much of the original cast.

In 2026, Wain and other stars reunited at the Autry Museum of the American West for an anniversary screening.

=== Undeveloped TV series ===
During a 2015 interview with Variety, Wain and Showalter stated that they wrote a pilot for a possible Fox television series based on the film. Wain described the series as a "22-minute Fox sitcom with commercials and nothing Rated R, so it was a little bit odd." The pilot was not picked up for a series.

=== Documentary ===
Alongside the prequel series, a making-of documentary, Hurricane of Fun: The Making of Wet Hot, was released on Netflix on July 24, 2015, consisting of behind-the-scenes interviews and footage shot during the filming of the movie.
