= Zak Orth =

American actor

- Orth in 2026
- Born: October 15, 1970 (age 56); Libertyville, Illinois, U.S.
- Education: DePaul University (BFA)
- Occupation: Actor
- Years active: 1994–present

Adam Zachary Orth (born October 15, 1970) is an American actor. He is known for his roles in Wet Hot American Summer, The Baxter, Melinda and Melinda, In and Out, Music and Lyrics, and NYC 22. He also starred in the NBC television drama Revolution as Aaron.

== Early life and education ==
Orth was born Adam Zachary Orth in Libertyville, Illinois, the son of Jane (Oehms), a piano teacher, and Robert Orth, an opera singer. Orth is an alumnus of The Theatre School at DePaul University.

== Career ==
He is a good friend of the members of the comedy group Stella and has appeared in many of their short films, as well as their 2005 TV series. He is also known for his brief role in Baz Luhrmann's adaptation of Shakespeare's Romeo + Juliet, as the character Gregory.

He is also one half of The Doilies, a musical comedy group, alongside Michael Showalter.

== Filmography ==
=== Film ===
Year	Title	Role	Notes
1994	Spanking the Monkey	Curtis	
1996	The Pallbearer	An Abernathy Cousin	
1996	Romeo + Juliet	Gregory	
1997	In & Out	Mike	
1995	My Teacher's Wife	Paul Faber	
1999	Snow Falling on Cedars	Deputy Abel Martinson	
2000	Down to You	Monk Jablonski	
2000	Loser	Adam	
2001	Wet Hot American Summer	J.J.	
2002	Stella shorts	Various roles	
2003	Kill the Poor	Butch	
2004	Hair High	Zip	Voice
2004	Melinda and Melinda	Peter	
2005	The F Word	Manny	
2005	The Baxter	Wendall Wimms	
2005	Prime	Randall	
2007	The Ten	Prosecutor / Tour Guide Barge Michaelson	
2007	Music and Lyrics	David Newbert - TV Executive #1	
2008	Life in Flight	Josh	
2008	Vicky Cristina Barcelona	Adam	
2009	(Untitled)	Porter Canby	
2009	Peter and Vandy	Keith	
2010	Monogamy	Quinny	
2010	You Will Meet a Tall Dark Stranger	Narrator	Voice
2010	The Other Guys	Accountant	
2012	Vamps	Renfield	
2014	They Came Together	Waiter with Pole	
2015	Hurricane of Fun: The Making of Wet Hot	Himself	Documentary
2026	A Statement	Dean Abrahamson	

=== Television ===
Year	Title	Role	Notes
1995, 2023–2024	Law & Order	Mr. Ricardi / Defense Attorney Harry Kagan	3 episodes
1997	Rose Hill	Douglas Clayborne	Television film
1998	When Trumpets Fade	Warren	Television film
2001, 2024	Law & Order: Special Victims Unit	Wally Parkers / Defense Attorney Harry Kagan	2 episodes
2002	Monday Night Mayhem	Don Ohlmeyer	Television film
2005	Stella	Elliot Morgenthal	Episode: "Pilot"
2005	Merry F %$in' Christmas	Nuns Gone Wild Host	Television special
2006	Cheap Seats	EZtech Executive / Network Bigwig	2 episodes
2008	John Adams	James McHenry	Episode: "Unnecessary War"
2008	Canterbury's Law	Gil Newhall	Episode: "Sick as Your Secrets"
2008	Fringe	Roy McComb	Episode: "The Ghost Network"
2009	30 Rock	Young Priest	Episode: "St. Valentine's Day"
2009	Wainy Days	Jake	Episode: "Dance Club"
2009	Michael & Michael Have Issues	Pinecone Guy	Unknown episodes
2009	Nurse Jackie	Zak	Episode: "Steak Knife"
2010	Michael Showalter's the Making of...	Allen McKenzie	Episode: "The Intel Choir Commercial"
2012	NYC 22	Eric Royce	Episode: "Pilot"
2012–2014	Revolution	Aaron Pittman	42 episodes
2014	Elementary	Gabe Coleman	Episode: "The Five Orange Pipz"
2014	The Good Wife	Steve Fratti	Episode: "The Trial"
2015	Happyish	Larry	3 episodes
2015	Wet Hot American Summer: First Day of Camp	JJ	8 episodes
2015, 2016	Above Average Presents	Mark Zimmerman / Owner	2 episodes
2015–2016	Veep	Jim Owens	3 episodes
2015–2018	Casual	Drew Meyers	15 episodes
2016–2018	Falling Water	Bill Boerg	18 episodes
2017	Wet Hot American Summer: Ten Years Later	JJ	8 episodes
2018	Human Kind Of	Mr. Russo / Ethan / Dad / Eye Patch (voices)	19 episodes
2020	Zoey's Extraordinary Playlist	Howie	5 episodes
2020	Unbreakable Kimmy Schmidt: Kimmy vs the Reverend	Cody Santimonio	Television film
2023	Tiny Beautiful Things	Sam Carter	Episode: "Pilot"
2023	White House Plumbers	Alfred C. Baldwin III	Episode: "Don't Drink the Whiskey at the Watergate"

=== Video games ===
Year	Title	Role	Notes
2007	Manhunt 2	Project Militia	
2010	Red Dead Redemption	The Local Population	
