= Well, I Should Have... =

Studio album by H. Jon Benjamin
- Released: November 27, 2015
- Genre: Experimental jazz, comedy music, outsider music
- Length: 29:56
- Label: Sub Pop

Well, I Should Have... (subtitled Learned How To Play Piano) is an experimental jazz album by American comedy actor and musician H. Jon Benjamin. It was released on November 27, 2015, on the Sub Pop label. The album was intentionally recorded to sound bad, since, as the album's title indicates, Benjamin does not know how to play piano, but still does so on the album, and Benjamin has never liked jazz very much.

Guests who appear on the album include Aziz Ansari and Kristen Schaal. The album also features actual jazz musicians such as Scott Kreitzer (saxophone), David Finck (bass), and Jonathan Peretz (drums). Every song on the album but one was mixed by Mark Desimone; the only song he did not mix was mixed by Bob's Burgers creator Loren Bouchard.

== Track listing ==
1. "Deal with the Devil" – 3:18
2. "I Can't Play Piano, Pt. 1" – 3:39
3. "I Can't Play Piano, Pt. 2" – 3:09
4. "It Had to Be You" – 5:32
5. "Soft Jazzercise" – 2:26
6. "I Can't Play Piano, Pt. 3" – 4:57
7. "I Can't Play Piano, Pt. 4 (Trill Baby Trill)" – 5:25
8. "Amy's Song (The Bum Steer)" – 1:30
