= The F Word (2005 film) =

- Promotional poster for the film.
- Directed by: Jed Weintrob
- Written by: Andrew Osborne; Jed Weintrob
- Produced by: Christian Ditlev Bruun; Nick Goldfarb; Lawrence Mattis
- Starring: Josh Hamilton; Edoardo Ballerini; Sam Rockwell; Zak Orth; Callie Thorne; Yul Vazquez
- Distributed by: IFC
- Release date: 2005
- Running time: 77 minutes
- Country: United States
- Language: English

The F Word is a 2005 docufiction film, directed by Jed Weintrob and produced by Christian D. Bruun and Nick Goldfarb. The film was selected to world premiere at the 2005 Tribeca Film Festival in New York City.

== Plot ==
Joe Pace is a radio personality whose program, The F Word, is being shut down by the U.S. Federal Communications Commission (FCC) after racking up over $1 million in unpaid indecency fines. On his last day on the air, which coincides with the last day of the 2004 Republican National Convention, Joe sets off to broadcast his own one-man march through Manhattan.

== Style and structure ==
The film combines fictional scenes - written by over thirty different writers - set among actual protests with documentary footage of people Joe meets along the way. The concept is loosely inspired by Medium Cool by Haskell Wexler. The film was shot by cinematographer Christian Ditlev Bruun and Heather Greer on two main cameras at 24 frames/second, as well as several other video formats for b-roll. The film was unconventionally color corrected and composited using several different types of software as well as in-camera adjustment. Motion graphics, titles, and color grading as well as the official poster and website was designed by Christian D. Bruun.

== Cast ==
Josh Hamilton stars along with Edoardo Ballerini, Zak Orth, Sam Rockwell, Callie Thorne, Waris Ahluwalia, Yul Vazquez and others, including many leaders of the protest movement: Reverend Billy, Peter Camejo, John Perry Barlow.

== Technical information ==
The film's main cameras were two Panasonic AG-DVX100(b) video cameras, filming at 23.976 fps with Advanced Pulldown. A few additional shots were filmed on other DV cameras using various pulldown techniques in Adobe After Effects. The film was edited using Final Cut Pro, the title sequence and all visual effects - created by Christian D. Bruun - were done using Adobe After Effects. The film was on-lined and output to HD using and Avid Symphony system.

== Release ==
The F Word premiered on April 26, 2005 at the Pace Schimmel Center in official competition at the Tribeca Film Festival. The film premiered on IFC TV on November 6, 2006 and was re-released on Blu-ray and re-premiered on IFC TV May 4, 2008.
