= H. Jon Benjamin =

American actor and comedian (born 1966)

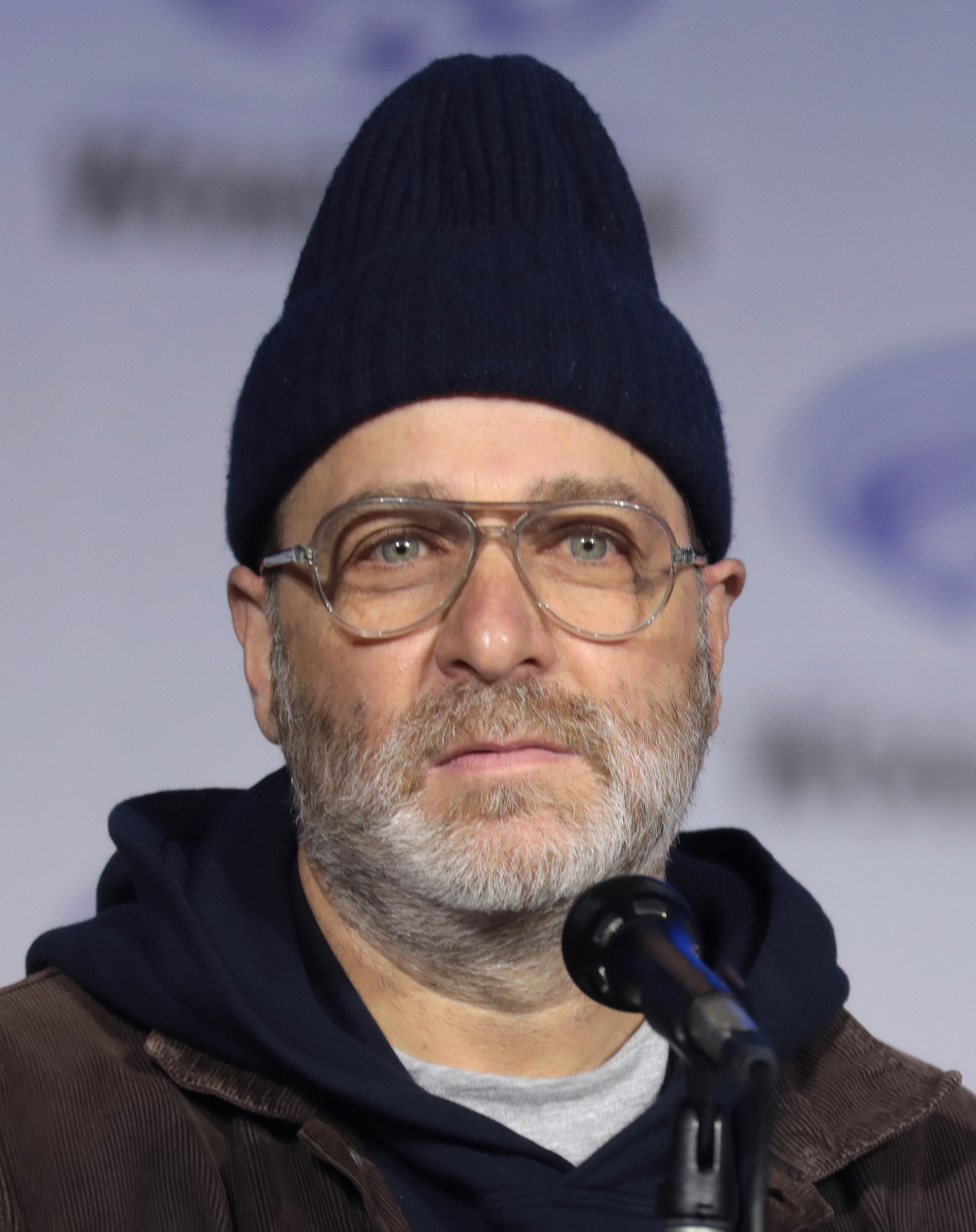
- Benjamin in 2022
- Born: Harry Jon Benjamin; May 23, 1966 (age 60); Worcester, Massachusetts, U.S.
- Education: Connecticut College (BA)
- Occupations: Actor; comedian; writer; producer; musician
- Years active: 1987–present
- Partner: Amy Beth Silver
- Children: 1

Harry Jon Benjamin (born May 23, 1966) is an American actor, comedian, writer, producer, and musician. He is known for his voice roles in adult animated series, including Sterling Archer in Archer, Bob Belcher in Bob's Burgers, Ben in Dr. Katz, Professional Therapist, Kevin in O'Grady, Carl Graves in Family Guy, Satan in Lucy, the Daughter of the Devil, and Coach McGuirk and Jason Penopolis in Home Movies, starring as the voice of Boy in the film Boy Kills World (2023) and its spin-off video game Super Dragon Punch Force 3 (2024). Benjamin was named 2014's male comedy performer of the year at Vulture's TV Awards for his work in Bob's Burgers and Archer. He also appeared in the 2001 satirical comedy film Wet Hot American Summer; its subsequent 2015 television series, Wet Hot American Summer: First Day of Camp; and the final installment of the franchise, the 2017 miniseries Wet Hot American Summer: 10 Years Later.

== Early life ==
Benjamin was born on May 23, 1966, to a Jewish family in Worcester, Massachusetts. His father, Howard, was CEO of an electric company, and his mother, Shirley, was a former ballet dancer who taught dance at a studio. He graduated from Worcester Academy in 1984 and Connecticut College in 1988.

== Career ==
Benjamin's comedy career began in Boston, where he was in a comedy duo with Sam Seder, then a member of Cross Comedy, a comedy team led by David Cross. For the first seven years of his career, Benjamin almost exclusively worked in groups rather than independently. Afterward, his independent work remained more experimental, rejecting traditional styles of stand-up comedy.

Benjamin's live projects include the Midnight Pajama Jam, a show performed in New York City with Jon Glaser and Tinkle, a show combining stand-up comedy and live music, co-hosted by Todd Barry and David Cross. A Midnight Pajama Jam DVD is currently in production. Benjamin and Cross appear together on the album Invite Them Up.

He was the guest on Space Ghost Coast to Coast in its eighty-first episode, "King Dead" on December 17, 1999, where Zorak and Moltar kidnapped him. He has appeared in the television show Cheap Seats, on ESPN Classic, as "Gene Stapleton" and "Rabbi Marc Shalowitz". He co-starred in Todd Barry's short film Borrowing Saffron and portrayed a talking can of vegetables with a shameful habit of autofellatio in the film Wet Hot American Summer. He made short cameos in Not Another Teen Movie as the football trainer and on the FX Network comedy drama Rescue Me as the pimp "F-bomb" in season two. He can be seen in Turbocharge-the Unauthorized Story of the Cars, a comedy biopic about the '80s rock band The Cars, playing the role of Cars' manager Elliot Roberts in his usual deadpan comedic delivery.

Benjamin has done extensive voice work in animated TV shows. His credits include starring roles in several Soup2Nuts cartoon shows, such as Science Court, Home Movies, O'Grady, Dr. Katz, Professional Therapist and Assy McGee.

The creators of Home Movies credited Benjamin, especially in his role as Coach John McGuirk, for much of the show's popularity. Home Movies co-creator Brendon Small later said that "if people really like [Home Movies], it's because of Jon Benjamin... it was the Jon Benjamin show, and the rest of us were supporting that." Co-creator Loren Bouchard said what Benjamin "brought to the show was irreplaceable. As talented as Brendon [Small] is and as much vision as he had, we needed Jon Benjamin." Home Movies writer Bill Braudis said Benjamin's "McGuirk is one of the greatest characters on TV ever... Benjamin always pulled it off."

He co-created Freak Show with David Cross. Benjamin starred as the Devil and multiple other roles in Lucy, the Daughter of the Devil, which ran for one season on Adult Swim beginning September 9, 2007. Benjamin plays a recurring character on the PBS Kids series WordGirl and is the announcer for The Sam Seder Show and The Majority Report. He did the voice of "Shelly", Sam Seder's accountant, on Breakroom Live with Maron & Seder.

Benjamin has made guest appearances in several animated shows. He was in the Aqua Teen Hunger Force episodes "Bus of the Undead" and "The Last One" as Mothmonsterman, in "Broodwich" as Mr. Sticks, in "Bible Fruit" as Mortimer Mango and played the live-action role of Master Shake in "Last Last One Forever and Ever", credited as Capt. Turd Mahoy. He made a cameo appearance as a government agent in the film Aqua Teen Hunger Force Colon Movie Film for Theaters alongside frequent collaborator Jon Glaser. He has appeared in Family Guy as Carl, a movie trivia–obsessed convenience store clerk who portrayed Yoda in the Star Wars parody episode "Something, Something, Something, Dark Side".

Other appearances include The Venture Bros., in the episodes "Escape to the House of Mummies Part II", "I Know Why the Caged Bird Kills" and "The Better Man", in which he played Dr. Orpheus's master—who appears in the form of Cerberus, Catherine the Great's horse and, in "The Better Man", both Dr. Orpheus's ex-wife and a future Dean Venture, respectively. He appeared in the Stella short "Bar", which can be found as an easter egg on the Season 1 DVD. Benjamin appeared on the Comedy Central sketch/variety show Important Things with Demetri Martin.

In 2009, Benjamin and David Cross created and wrote for Paid Programming, a live-action pilot for Cartoon Network's late night programing block, Adult Swim. Paid Programming was not picked up for a full series and Benjamin referred to it as an "abject failure".

Benjamin was featured in a Super Bowl XLIII Bud Light commercial with Conan O'Brien and was responsible for the McCain Girls videos on YouTube. He voices Sterling Archer, a secret agent in the FX series Archer that first aired January 14, 2010. He has appeared in several segments of the television show Human Giant and had a cameo in the American Dad! episode "License to Till" as a talking head of cabbage.

Benjamin starred in the Comedy Central series Jon Benjamin Has a Van, which he co-created with comedian Leo Allen. The series debuted on May 14, 2011; a total of 10 episodes aired, the last on August 10, 2011.

Beginning in 2013, Benjamin's voice can be heard as the narrator of a series of TV commercials for Coke Zero, including some with tie-ins to ESPN's College Game Day program.

In 2014, Benjamin was named as the year's best male comedy performer for his work on Bob's Burgers and Archer by the Vulture TV Awards, a digital expansion of New York magazine.

In 2015, despite not knowing how to play any instrument, Benjamin released his first jazz album, Well, I Should Have.... Benjamin "played" piano and was joined by Scott Kreitzer on sax, David Finck on bass, and Jonathan Peretz on drums.

Benjamin wrote a comedic autobiography, Failure is an Option: An Attempted Memoir, which was published by Penguin Random House in May 2018. He also narrated the audiobook.

Benjamin began appearing in commercials for Arby's restaurant chain in 2018 as their new spokesman.

In March 2020, Benjamin was the voice of Saddam Hussein in Blowback, a podcast about the Iraq War created and hosted by Brendan James and Noah Kulwin.

In 2024, Benjamin appears as the voice of a pigeon in a series of Progressive Insurance commercials.

== Personal life ==
Benjamin was named "Harry" after his paternal grandfather, but his family has always called him by his middle name "Jon"; in his early years, he was unaware of his actual first name. He has said that the inclusion of his first initial in the credits on Dr. Katz, Professional Therapist was done without his consent by co-star Laura Silverman "just to make fun of me."

Benjamin's longtime partner is set decorator Amy Beth Silver. They have a son and live in Brooklyn.

Benjamin is an amateur ornithologist.

In January 2020, Benjamin endorsed Bernie Sanders for president and narrated a series of videos on Sanders's health care proposals. In September 2020, Benjamin voiced an animated version of himself to promote the launch video for the Gravel Institute's YouTube channel.

== Filmography ==
=== Film ===
Year	Title	Role	Notes
1997	Who's the Caboose?	Ken Fold	
1998	Next Stop Wonderland	Eric	
2000	Happy Accidents	Reveler #1	
2001	Wet Hot American Summer	Can of Vegetables (voice)	
2001	Not Another Teen Movie	Trainer	
2002	Martin & Orloff	Keith	
2002	Borrowing Saffron	Ron	Short film
2003	Temptation	Kevin	
2004	New York Minute	Vendor	
2007	Puberty: The Movie	The Torah / Uncle Irving	
2007	Aqua Teen Hunger Force Colon Movie Film for Theaters	CIA Agent #1 (voice)	
2007	The Ten	Lying Rhyno (voice)	
2008	The Toe Tactic	Police Officer	
2008	A Bad Situationist	Isaiah	
2008	Turbocharge: The Unauthorized Story of the Cars	Dance Instructor	
2014	22 Jump Street	MCS Coach	Uncredited
2014	Jason Nash Is Married	Dennis	
2015	Creative Control	Gary Gass	
2015	Limbo	Jim	Short film
2015	Hell and Back	The Tree (voice)	
2022	My Butt Has a Fever	Bob Belcher (voice)	Short film
2022	The Bob's Burgers Movie	Bob Belcher, Jimmy Pesto Jr., additional voices (voice)	
2024	Boy Kills World	Boy's Inner Voice (voice)	
2024	Familiar Touch	Steve	

=== Television ===
Year	Title	Role	Notes
1994	Understanding	Quark	Episode: "Uncertainty"
1995–1999; 2002	Dr. Katz, Professional Therapist	Ben, Various voices	80 episodes Also writer
1997	The Chris Rock Show	Extra	1 episode
1997	The Jenny McCarthy Show	Various	6 episodes
1997–2000	Science Court	Prof. Nick Parsons (voice)	29 episodes
1998	Sex and the City	Jeff	Episode: "Bay of Married Pigs"
1998	Upright Citizens Brigade	Various	10 episodes
1999	Dick and Paula Celebrity Special	Various	2 episodes Also writer
1999	Space Ghost Coast to Coast	Himself	Episode: "King Dead"
1999–2004	Home Movies	Coach John McGuirk, Jason Penopolis, Various voices	52 episodes Also writer and producer
2001–2009	Aqua Teen Hunger Force	Various voices	5 episodes
2002	Saddle Rash	Gummy, Tommy Morgan (voices)	Pilot; Also writer
2003	Hey Monie!	Self-defense instructor	1 episode
2004	Pilot Season	Ken Fold	2 episodes
2004	Say Uncle	Jonny	Failed pilot
2004–2006	Cheap Seats: Without Ron Parker	Rabbi Marc Shalowitz, Gene Stapleton	4 episodes
2004–2006	O'Grady	Kevin Harnisch, Iris, Philip (voices)	19 episodes
2005	Rescue Me	Gary	Episode: "Rebirth"
2005–2006	Sunday Pants	Bob the Log	Travel Logs shorts
2005–2007	Lucy, the Daughter of the Devil	Satan, Special Father #1 (voices)	11 episodes Also writer
2006	Freak Show	Tuck, Various voices	7 episodes Also co-creator, writer and executive producer
2006–2008	Assy McGee	The Mayor, Various voices	19 episodes Also writer and consulting producer
2006–2012	The Venture Bros.	The Master (voice)	4 episodes
2006–present	Family Guy	Carl Graves, Bob Belcher, Various voices	27 episodes
2007–2008	Human Giant	Various	4 episodes Also consultant writer
2007–2015	WordGirl	Reginald the Jewelry Store Clerk, InvisiBill, Additional Voices	31 episodes
2009	Michael & Michael Have Issues	Larry	Episode: "Frog Box"
2009	Paid Programming	Various	Pilot; Co-creator, writer and executive producer
2009	Parks and Recreation	Scott Braddock	Episode: "Kaboom"
2009	Titan Maximum	Tap Banister (voice)	Episode: "Dirty Lansbury"
2009–2010	Important Things with Demetri Martin	Various	7 episodes Also writer and co-producer
2009–2023	Archer	Sterling Archer (voice)	145 episodes
2011	Jon Benjamin Has a Van	Host	10 episodes Also co-creator, writer and executive producer
2011	Soul Quest Overdrive	Mortimer (voice)	6 episodes Also co-creator and co-writer
2011	American Dad!	Talking Cabbage (voice)	Episode: "License to Till"
2011–present	Bob's Burgers	Bob Belcher, Jimmy Pesto Jr., Various voices	Main role
2012	Suburgatory	Tabitha	Episode: "Ryan's Song"
2012	Ugly Americans	Dick Maggotbone (voice)	Episode: "Mark Loves Dick"
2013	Nathan for You	Himself	Episode: "Yogurt Shop/Pizzeria"
2014–2025	Last Week Tonight with John Oliver	Ben, Scientist, Defendant, Blank Void, Air Traffic Controller	6 episodes
2015	Conan	Sterling Archer (voice)	Episode: "677"
2015	Wet Hot American Summer: First Day of Camp	Can of Vegetables, Mitch	4 episodes
2015	The Jim Gaffigan Show	Kevin	Episode: "The Bible Story"
2015	The Adventures of Puss in Boots	Baltasar (voice)	Episode: "Luck"
2015	All Hail King Julien	Fred (voice)	5 episodes
2015–2017	Master of None	Benjamin	4 episodes
2016–2017	People of Earth	Officer Glimmer	8 episodes
2017	Wet Hot American Summer: Ten Years Later	Can of Vegetables, Mitch	5 episodes
2017	Difficult People	Brian	Episode: "Fuzz Buddies"
2018	The Who Was? Show	Narrator (voice)	13 episodes
2018	The Simpsons	Bob Belcher (voice)	Episode: "My Way or the Highway to Heaven"
2019	Wyatt Cenac's Problem Areas	Batman	Episode: "Inequality Problems"
2019	Star Trek: Short Treks	Edward Larkin	Episode: "The Trouble with Edward"
2020–2022	Central Park	Mayor Whitney Whitebottom (voice)	7 episodes
2021–2023	Teenage Euthanasia	Various voices	Episode: "Adventures in Beetle Sitting"

=== Video games ===
Year	Title	Role
2017	Destiny 2	Radio voice, Scabretti
2022	Destiny 2: The Witch Queen	Scabretti
2024	Super Dragon Punch Force 3	Boy's Inner Voice (voice)
2025	Fortnite Battle Royale	Bob Belcher (voice)

== Discography ==
- Well, I Should Have... (2015)
- The Soundtrack Collection (2020)
