= Wet Hot American Summer: Ten Years Later =

2017 American comedy television miniseries

- Genre: Comedy; Satire
- Created by: Michael Showalter; David Wain
- Based on: Wet Hot American Summer by David Wain and Michael Showalter
- Directed by: David Wain
- Starring: Elizabeth Banks; Michael Ian Black; Janeane Garofalo; Joe Lo Truglio; Ken Marino; H. Jon Benjamin; Michael Showalter; A. D. Miles; Marguerite Moreau; Zak Orth; David Hyde Pierce; Marisa Ryan; Amy Poehler; Paul Rudd; Christopher Meloni; Molly Shannon
- Opening theme: "Jane" by Jefferson Starship
- Country of origin: United States
- Original language: English
- No. of episodes: 8

Production
- Executive producers: Michael Showalter; David Wain; Jonathan Stern; Peter Principato; Howard Bernstein
- Camera setup: Single-camera
- Running time: 24–31 minutes
- Production companies: Showalter Wain; Abominable Pictures; Principato-Young Entertainment

Original release
- Network: Netflix
- Release: August 4, 2017

Related
- Wet Hot American Summer: First Day of Camp (2015)

Wet Hot American Summer: Ten Years Later is an American satirical comedy television miniseries set in 1991 in a summer camp and New York City.

Created by David Wain and Michael Showalter and directed by Wain, the Netflix series is part of the Wet Hot American Summer franchise, following Wain's 2001 film Wet Hot American Summer and the 2015 prequel television series Wet Hot American Summer: First Day of Camp. The series consists of eight episodes, and was released on August 4, 2017.

Showalter cited St. Elmo's Fire, Singles, and The Big Chill as inspirations.

== Cast and characters ==
=== Returning cast from the film (in alphabetical order) ===
The following cast members reprised their roles from Wet Hot American Summer:

- Elizabeth Banks as Lindsay, now a newscaster
- H. Jon Benjamin as Mitch/Can of Mixed Vegetables
- Michael Ian Black as McKinley, now Ben's husband and a stay-at-home dad
  - Black also portrays U.S. sitting President George H. W. Bush
- Janeane Garofalo as Beth
- Nina Hellman as Nancy
- Samm Levine as Arty
- Joe Lo Truglio as Neil, now Victor's co-worker
- Ken Marino as Victor, now a flair bartender
- Christopher Meloni as Gene Jenkinson/Jonas Jurgenson
- A. D. Miles as Gary, now a successful chef
- Marguerite Moreau as Katie, now the VP of a cosmetics company
- Zak Orth as J.J., now a video store clerk and Mark and Claire's best friend
- David Hyde Pierce as Full Professor Henry Neumann
- Amy Poehler as Susie, now a Hollywood producer
- Paul Rudd as Andy
- Marisa Ryan as Abby, now a sex advisor
- Molly Shannon as Gail
- Michael Showalter as Coop, now a writer
  - Showalter also portrays U.S. former President Ronald Reagan

=== Returning cast from the previous miniseries ===
The following cast members reprised their roles from Wet Hot American Summer: First Day of Camp:

- Beth Dover as Shari, Neil's ex-girlfriend
- Rob Huebel as Brodfard Gilroy
- David Wain as Yaron
  - Wain also portrays Arkansas Governor Bill Clinton
- Lake Bell as Donna
- Paul Scheer as Dave, now Lindsay's producer
- Josh Charles as Blake of Camp Tigerclaw
- Kristen Wiig as Courtney of Camp Tigerclaw
- Rich Sommer as Graham of Camp Tigerclaw
- Eric Nenninger as Warner of Camp Tigerclaw
- John Early as Logan
- Chris Pine as Eric
- Jason Schwartzman as Greg

=== New cast ===
- Adam Scott as Ben, replacing Bradley Cooper
- Mark Feuerstein as Mark
- Sarah Burns as Claire
- Alyssa Milano as Renata Delvecchio née Murphy
- Jai Courtney as Garth MacArthur, Susie's lead actor
- Melanie Lynskey as Laura, Coop's editor
- Skyler Gisondo as Jeremy "Deegs" Deegenstein, the "new Andy"
- Joey Bragg as Seth
- Anne-Marie Johnson as Burkhart, Reagan's lackey
- Chris Redd as Mason
- Joshua Malina as Deep Throat
- Maya Erskine as Ginny, Coop's fiancée
- Marlo Thomas as Vivian
- Dax Shepard as Mikey
- Ava Acres as Jenny

== Episodes ==
No.	Title	Directed by	Written by	Original release date
1	"Reunion"	David Wain	Krister Johnson & Michael Showalter	August 4, 2017
In August 1991, the far-flung alums of Camp Firewood make their away to Maine for a long-awaited reunion.
2	"Softball"	David Wain	Christina Lee & Michael Showalter	August 4, 2017
Beth drops a bombshell, McKinley grows suspicious of the nanny, and Andy spars with the new cool kid at camp. Meanwhile, a sinister plan takes shape.
3	"Tigerclaw"	David Wain	Nicole Drespel & Matt Kriete	August 4, 2017
While Katie and Andy head out a mission to save the camp, Lindsay follows a hot tip, and Donna approaches Victor with a surprising request.
4	"Lunch"	David Wain	Sarah-Violet Bliss & Charles Rogers	August 4, 2017
A newcomer shakes up the chemistry at camp. Mitch reaches out to an old friend for help. Susie's return to the theater creates a stir.
5	"King of Camp"	David Wain	Fran Gillespie & Craig Rowin	August 4, 2017
Andy challenges Deegs to a "King of Camp" showdown, Neil helps Vic prepare for his big moment, and troubling discoveries abound for the Firewood gang.
6	"Rain"	David Wain	David Wain & Michael Showalter	August 4, 2017
As a storm lashes the camp, tensions between lovers and rivals boil over, and Vic's date takes a turn for the weird.
7	"Dance"	David Wain	Krister Johnson & Anthony King	August 4, 2017
While Mitch's posse scrambles to thwart Reagan's plan, Coop delivers an emotional speech at the dance, and a shocking secret comes to light.
8	"End Summer Night's Dream"	David Wain	David Wain & Michael Showalter	August 4, 2017
With the clock ticking and their options running out, the Camp Firewood family braces for disaster. But there are more surprises in store.

== Reception ==
The series holds a score of 81% on Rotten Tomatoes, based on 31 reviews, with an average rating of 6.61/10. The site's critic consensus states: "By owning its own ridiculousness, 10 Years Later is a fan-pleasing addition to the cult classic series." Metacritic reports a score of 67 out of 100, based on 12 critics.

Reviewing for Vulture, Jen Chaney described the series as "basically eight episodes of unabashed retro-fueled silliness that has no interest in trying to make anything resembling sense as far as of plot or continuity is concerned. [...] I mean that as a compliment." David Sims of The Atlantic criticized the "dialed back" humor and felt that "Ten Years Later will appeal to fans who just want to see everyone get back together, only this time dressed in goofy ’90s outfits."
