= They Came Together =

2014 film directed by David Wain

- Theatrical release poster
- Directed by: David Wain
- Written by: David Wain; Michael Showalter
- Produced by: Michael Showalter
- Starring: Paul Rudd; Amy Poehler; Cobie Smulders; Christopher Meloni; Max Greenfield; Bill Hader; Ellie Kemper; Jason Mantzoukas; Melanie Lynskey; Ed Helms
- Cinematography: Tom Houghton
- Edited by: Jamie Gross
- Music by: Craig Wedren; Matt Novack
- Production company: Showalter-Wain
- Distributed by: Lionsgate
- Release dates: January 24, 2014 (Sundance); June 27, 2014 (United States)
- Running time: 83 minutes
- Country: United States
- Language: English
- Budget: $3 million
- Box office: $82,780 (international)

They Came Together is a 2014 American satirical romantic comedy film directed by David Wain and written by Wain and Michael Showalter. The film stars Paul Rudd and Amy Poehler, with supporting roles from Cobie Smulders, Christopher Meloni, Bill Hader, Ellie Kemper, Melanie Lynskey, and Ed Helms.

Joel and Molly, over dinner with couple Kyle and Karen, recount their entire relationship. It is a parody of romantic comedies infused with Showalter and Wain's absurd approach.

The film had its world premiere at the 2014 Sundance Film Festival, and was released theatrically (with a simultaneous release on iTunes) on June 27, 2014.

== Plot ==
As Joel and Molly have dinner with unhappy couple Kyle and Karen, they recount how they first began dating in New York City.

At the time they first meet Molly owns a small independent candy store, Upper Sweet Side, which is being pushed out of business by Joel's company, a larger candy corporation Candy Systems and Research (CSR). Joel lives with his girlfriend Tiffany until one day he returns to their apartment to propose to her with roses and an engagement ring in hand, only to catch her cheating on him with his coworker Trevor. Trevor is also his work rival, stealing an account from him and vying for the same promotion.

On their way to the same Halloween party, Joel and Molly bump into each other. They were both invited by their respective best friends to set them up, and ironically come dressed in identical Ben Franklin costumes. Although they initially fight, they later bump into each other in a second-hand bookstore and end up going on a date at a coffee shop.

Spending hours together, Joel and Molly bond over many things they have in common, and he reveals his dream to open his own coffee shop. She invites him home for dinner, where he meets Molly's son Tucker. Later, on the front steps, Joel admits that he is not over Tiffany, so Molly leaves angrily.

Joel goes to the sweet shop to apologize, but both take so long getting ready, as he rehearses out front and Molly goes through a montage of trying on outfits, that they miss each other. He eventually apologizes over the phone, and they begin dating. Following a montage of the couple laughing and enjoying themselves in piles of leaves, at the greengrocer's, etc., they go on a road trip so Joel can meet her parents.

Driving to the countryside to meet them, Joel discovers they are white supremacists. He and Molly argue and break up. Joel begins seeing Tiffany again, as Trevor had dumped her, and returns to his life before Molly. She begins dating her banker Eggbert, although they clearly have little in common.

As Molly and Joel share friends, they coincide at the usual autumn festivities. Molly and Eggbert become engaged at New Year's. Joel realizes that he is still in love with her, so he breaks up with Tiffany, who reveals she is actually Judge Judy.

Months later, just after he prevents CSR from destroying Upper Sweet Side, he races to Molly's wedding. Joel arrives to find that she has already left Eggbert at the altar, so he goes to the Brooklyn Promenade to find her. All of the wedding guests follow Joel there.

Joel makes a speech declaring his love, which is repeatedly interrupted, including by Molly's ex-husband Spike, just released from jail, who confronts Joel. They have a fight, which Joel wins, and Spike is again apprehended by the police (only to be suddenly executed on site). Joel and Molly agree to get back together; one year later they get married, and Joel unveils a folding coffee table now placed outside Upper Sweet Side, which he calls Cup of Joel.

In the present, Joel and Molly reveal that they are getting divorced, as their marriage has since fallen apart due to their business ventures failing and increasing debts. Because of this, Molly developed a pill addiction and started sleeping with her old boyfriend Frank again, and Molly and Joel mutually decided they should be friends.

After they finish telling their story to Kyle and Karen, both couples agree to give their marriages another shot.

== Cast ==
- Paul Rudd as Joel, the male lead
- Amy Poehler as Molly, the female lead
- Cobie Smulders as Tiffany Amber Thigpen, Joel's girlfriend
- Christopher Meloni as Roland, Joel's boss
- Max Greenfield as Jake
- Bill Hader as Kyle
- Ellie Kemper as Karen
- Jason Mantzoukas as Bob, Joel's best friend
- Melanie Lynskey as Brenda
- Ed Helms as Eggbert Flaps
- Noureen DeWulf as Melanie
- Michael Ian Black as Trevor
- Michaela Watkins as Habermeyer
- Randall Park as Martinson
- Teyonah Parris as Wanda
- David Wain as Keith Flaps
- Jack McBrayer as Oliver
- Kenan Thompson as Teddy
- Ken Marino as Tommy
- Erinn Hayes as Valerie
- Zak Orth as Waiter With Pole
- Norah Jones as herself
- Adam Scott as Sound Engineer
- John Stamos as Assistant Engineer
- Michael Murphy as Roger
- Lynn Cohen as Bubby
- Michael Shannon as Spike
- Jeffrey Dean Morgan as Frank
- Judge Judy Sheindlin as herself

== Production ==
The film was written by David Wain and Michael Showalter. Rudd and Poehler participated in a table read of the script at the SF Sketchfest in January 2012.

== Release ==
The film had its world premiere at the Sundance Film Festival on January 24, 2014; the film went on to screen at the Sundance London Film Festival on April 26, 2014, and also screened at the Chicago Critics Film Festival, Seattle International Film Festival, and BAMcinema Fest. The film was released in the United States on June 27, 2014 in a limited release and through video on demand by Lionsgate.

On May 30, 2026, American YouTuber Jimmy Here was given permission by Lionsgate to upload the film to his YouTube channel. Lionsgate initially received a copyright notice after a scene from the film was shown in one of Jimmy Here's previous videos, but Jimmy Here later revealed that Lionsgate chose not to take action and eventually allowed Jimmy Here to stream his live reaction to the film on his channel.

== Reception ==
On review aggregator Rotten Tomatoes the film holds an approval rating of 70% based on 96 reviews, with an average rating of 6.5/10. The website's critics consensus states: "They Came Together is surprisingly messy and perhaps too smart for its own good, but Amy Poehler and Paul Rudd's chemistry is enough to overcome many of the movie's flaws." On Metacritic, it was assigned a weighted average score of 60 out of 100, based on 27 critics, indicating "mixed or average reviews".
