= Camp Modin =

Jewish summer camp in Maine, US

- Interactive map of Camp Modin
- Type: Summer Camp
- Location: Belgrade, Maine, USA
- Coordinates: 44°31′36″N 69°47′19″W
- Website: www.modin.com

Camp Modin is a Jewish summer camp in New England. It was established in 1922 in what is now Lake George Regional Park in Canaan, Maine. In 1992 the camp moved to Salmon Lake in Maine's Belgrade Lakes region. An early example of a summer camp intended to provide Jewish children with Hebrew, religious, and cultural education as well as recreation, Camp Modin has been described as "the prototype for camps sponsored by every branch of the community, from socialist Zionists to Orthodox Jews."

Camp Modin is now a coed, non-denominational, pluralistic Jewish and kosher camp, employing over 180 professional teachers, mentors and counselors and providing more than 70 activities. It is accredited by the American Camp Association and is a member of both the Maine Youth Camping Association and the Maine Camp Experience.

Camp Modin became one of the first Jewish camps in the US to announce it would be open in the summer of 2020 during the COVID-19 pandemic.

== History ==
Camp Modin was founded by three couples who had studied under the influential Jewish educator Samson Benderly: Albert & Bertha Schoolman (who also founded and directed the Central Jewish Institute camps in Port Jervis, N.Y., later renamed Cejwin.), Alexander & Julia Dushkin, and Isaac & Libbie Berkson. They opened a boys' camp on the site of an abandoned hotel on the shores of Lake George in Canaan, Maine in 1922, with 45 campers in the first class. A girls' camp on the other side of the lake was opened in 1925.

The camp was advertised as "The Summer Camp with a Jewish Idea" and was notable for its goal of financial self-sufficiency, allowing it to maintain its independence from other Jewish organizations; for the significant roles played by women in its operation (Libbie Berkson was the camp's director until 1958); and for its emphasis on Jewish pluralism, welcoming children from all Jewish religious movements, although the camp developed a reputation as the camp of choice for children from prominent traditional Jewish families, and Berkson described its religious practice as "religiously Conservative with leanings toward Liberal Reconstructionism". The prominent rabbi and philosopher Milton Steinberg was a counselor at the camp.

The Berksons bought out the other partners' interests in the camp in 1942 and ran it until 1958. In 1992, camp director David Adler, decided to move to a more modern facility, and relocated the camp to Salmon Lake in Belgrade.

== Activities ==
Campers at Modin range in age from seven to sixteen years old and participate in a range of typical camp activities.

The current directors of Camp Modin are Howard & Lisa Salzberg and Samara Lender.

== Notable people ==
Writer and director David Wain attended the camp in the 1980s, and Modin was the inspiration for his summer camp film, Wet Hot American Summer. Hank Azaria, an actor, also attended this camp. His last name is mentioned aloud as a fictional character's name in “Wet Hot American Summer” as a nod to the actor. Composer Craig Wedren, one of Wain's childhood friends, was another well-known summer resident at Modin. "We lived for going to Camp Modin," Wedren has stated in an interview, "our parents, aunts and uncles had all gone there, and we went there, too. I loved that place. We all did." Other famous alumni include director Shawn Levy and TV Funhouse creator Robert Smigel. Mindy Schneider's 2007 memoir "Not a Happy Camper" is rumored to be based on the original Camp Modin: the author attended Modin as a child. The playwright Benj Pasek attended the camp for five years and went on to write the Broadway hit musical and multiple Tony Award-winning musical Dear Evan Hansen
