= Kevin Sussman =

American actor and comedian (born 1970)

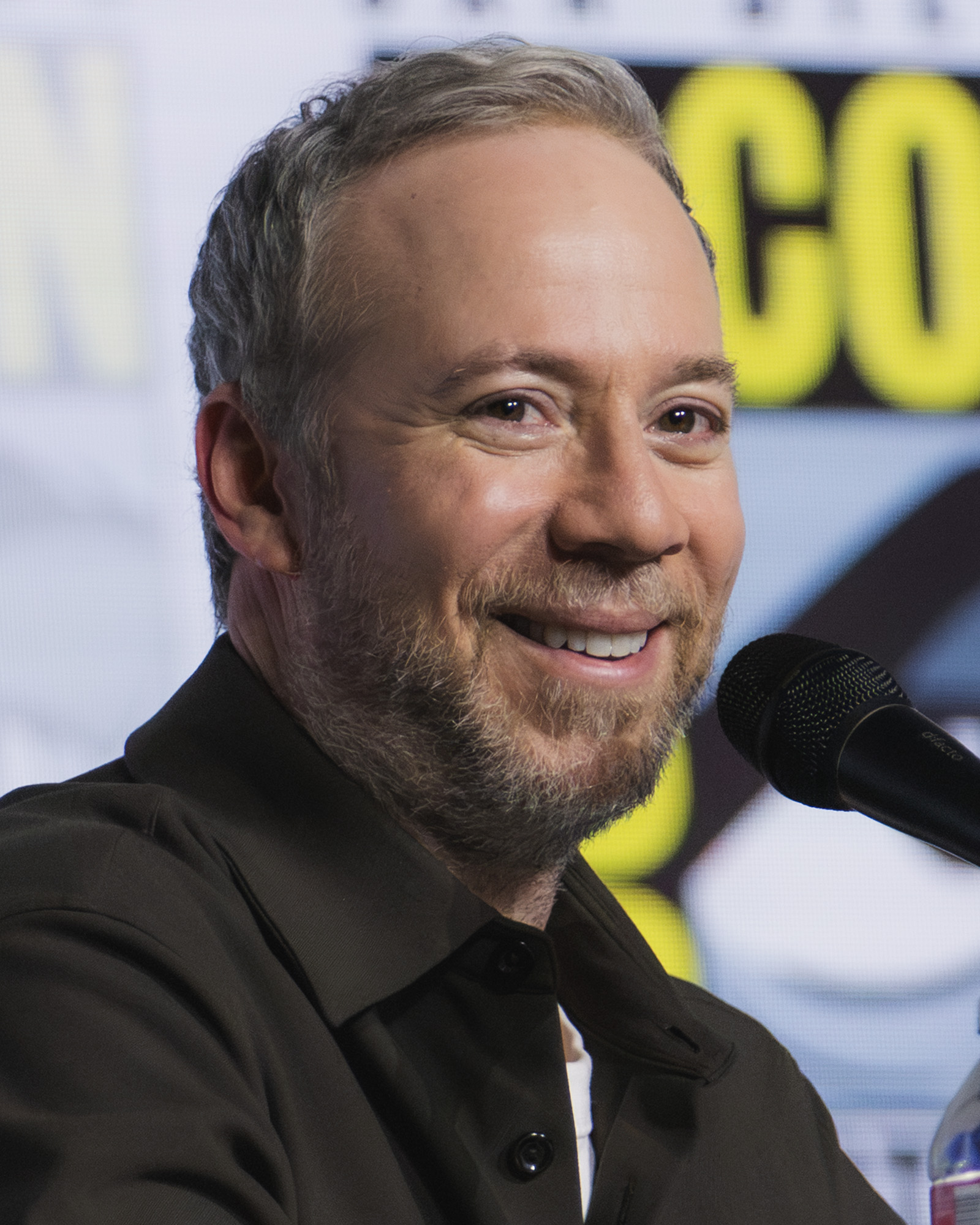
- Sussman in 2026
- Born: December 4, 1970 (age 55); New York City, US
- Education: American Academy of Dramatic Arts
- Occupations: Actor, comedian
- Years active: 1996–present
- Spouses: Alessandra Young (m. 2006; div. 2017) Addie Hall (m. 2023)

Kevin L. Sussman (born December 4, 1970) is an American actor and comedian. He played Walter on the ABC comedy-drama Ugly Betty and Stuart Bloom on the CBS sitcom The Big Bang Theory. Starting with the sixth season of The Big Bang Theory, he was promoted to a series regular. Sussman stars in the series Stuart Fails to Save the Universe, which debuted in July 2026.

== Early life, family and education ==
Sussman is the youngest of four brothers born to Jewish parents Michael and Barbara Sussman. He grew up in Staten Island, New York City, New York where he attended Staten Island Technical High School and graduated from New Dorp High School.

He attended the College of Staten Island for a year but graduated from the American Academy of Dramatic Arts in Manhattan, New York City. He later studied with acting teacher Uta Hagen for four years.

== Career ==
Sussman's professional acting began in commercials, playing geeks or nerds. At the time, he worked as a computer consultant.

In 1999, he made his film debut in Liberty Heights as Alan Joseph Zuckerman. Sussman moved to Los Angeles when he was cast in Ugly Betty. He played the character Stuart Bloom on The Big Bang Theory from 2009 to the series end in May 2019.

In 2011 and 2012, he worked with The Big Bang Theory co-star John Ross Bowie to create two television comedies: The Ever After Part (FOX) and The Second Coming of Rob (CBS).

On July 9, 2025, it was announced that Sussman would star in a spin-off series Stuart Fails to Save the Universe to be streamed on HBO Max. The show also stars Lauren Lapkus and Brian Posehn.

== Personal life ==
Sussman was married to Alessandra Young from 2006 until 2017.

Sussman married Addie Hall in April 2023.

== Filmography ==
=== Film ===
Year	Title	Role	Notes
1999	Liberty Heights	Alan Joseph Zuckerman	
2000	Almost Famous	Lenny	
2001	Wet Hot American Summer	Steve	
2001	Kissing Jessica Stein	Calculator Guy	
2001	A.I. Artificial Intelligence	Supernerd	
2002	Pipe Dream	James	
2002	Threads	Caesar	
2002	Changing Lanes	Tyler Cohen	
2002	Sweet Home Alabama	Barry Lowenstein	
2004	Little Black Book	Ira	
2005	Hitch	Neil	
2006	The Wedding Album	Oswald	
2006	Funny Money	Denis Slater	
2006	Ira & Abby	Lenny	
2006	For Your Consideration	Commercial Director	
2007	Heavy Petting	Ras	
2008	Sincerely, Ted L. Nancy	Ted	
2008	Made of Honor	Tiny Shorts Guy	
2008	Insanitarium	Dave	
2008	Burn After Reading	Tuchman Marsh Man	
2009	Taking Woodstock	Stan	
2010	Killers	Mac Bailey	
2010	Alpha and Omega	Shakey (voice)	
2011	Freeloaders	Benedict 'Benny' Vicvikis	
2012	2nd Serve	Scott Belcher/O.C.D.	
2025	Hurricanna	Bipolar Man	

=== Television ===
Year	Title	Role	Notes
1996	Law & Order	Joe	1 episode
1998	Ghost Stories	Joey Howell	1 episode
1999	Third Watch	Tuba Guy	1 episode
2000	The Sopranos	Kevin	Episode: "Guy Walks into a Psychiatrist's Office..."
2003	Law & Order: Criminal Intent	Phil Hobart	1 episode
2004	ER	Colin	Episodes: "Just a Touch", "Abby Normal"
2006–2007	Ugly Betty	Walter	Main role (season 1)
2007–2008	My Name Is Earl	Dwayne	Episodes: "My Name Is Inmate #28301-016: Part 1", "No Heads and a Duffle Bag"
2008	CSI: Crime Scene Investigation	Don	1 episode
2008	The Middleman	Ivan Avi/The Palindrome	1 episode
2009–2019	The Big Bang Theory	Stuart Bloom	Season 2–5; 7 (recurring); Season 6; 8–12 (series regular); 108 episodes
2010	The Mentalist	Phil Redmond	Episode: "Rose-Colored Glasses"
2010	The Good Guys	Skeeter	Episodes: "Bait & Switch", "$3.52"
2010	Childrens Hospital	Daffy Giraffy	1 episode
2012	Weeds	Terry	Episodes: "Allosaurus Crush Castle", "Five Miles From Yetzer Hara", "Threshold"
2015	Wet Hot American Summer: First Day of Camp	Steve	3 episodes
2022	The Dropout	Mark Roessler	6 episodes
2022	Call Me Kat	Zac	2 episodes
2022	Better Call Saul	Mr. Lingk	2 episodes
2023	Lessons in Chemistry	Walter Pine	Recurring
2025	FBI	Agent Kevin Saxton	1 episode
2026- present	Stuart Fails to Save the Universe	Stuart Bloom	Main role
