= Eric Nenninger =

American actor

- Occupation: Actor
- Years active: 2000–present
- Spouse: Angel Parker (m. 2002)
- Children: 2

Eric Nenninger is an American actor, best known for playing Scott Braddock in the 2003 horror film Jeepers Creepers 2. He had recurring roles as Cadet Eric Hanson on Malcolm in the Middle and Scott in One Day at a Time.

== Early life and education ==
Nenninger attended Ladue Horton Watkins High School in St. Louis. In 1997, Nenninger moved to Los Angeles to attend the American Academy of Dramatic Arts. In 2000, he started to train at the British American Drama Academy in Oxford.

== Career ==
Nenninger has starred in two films, Jeepers Creepers 2 and The Pool at Maddy Breaker's, and appeared in several TV series, including The X-Files, NCIS, CSI: Crime Scene Investigation, Generation Kill, and Malcolm in the Middle. He has a supporting role on the TV series Glory Daze. In 2011, Nenninger co-starred as the voice and likeness of Matthew Ryan, an employee for the fictional company InstaHeat in the case, "The Gas Man" in the Arson desk in the video game L.A. Noire.

== Personal life ==
He is married to actress Angel Parker and they have two children together.

== Filmography ==
Year	Title	Role	Notes
2000	Opposite Sex	Kevin Dolby	1 episode
2000	ER	Jeremy Barnes	1 episode
2000	The X-Files	Jared Chirp	Episode: "Signs and Wonders"
2000–2002	Malcolm in the Middle	Cadet Eric Hanson	Guest (season 1), recurring role (seasons 2–3)
2000–2009	CSI: Crime Scene Investigation	Jesse Overton & officer Collins	2 episodes
2003	Jeepers Creepers 2	Scott "Scotty" Braddock	Feature film
2003	The Pool at Maddy Breaker's	Robert "Bob" Tull	TV movie
2004	JAG	Boatswain's Mate of the Watch	1 episode
2008	NCIS	Navy Corpsman Taylor Henley	1 episode
2008	Generation Kill	Captain Dave "Captain America" McGraw	Miniseries; recurring role
2009	Reconciliation	Grant Taylor	Feature film
2009	24	Agent Davis	1 episode
2009	Bones	Peter Kroon	1 episode
2010–2011	Glory Daze	Damon Smythe	Recurring role
2011	L.A. Noire	Matthew Ryan (voice)	Video game
2011–2012	Weeds	Dmitri thug #1	4 episodes
2012–2013	Kickin' It	Principal/Coach Funderburk	6 episodes
2013	Castle	John Dessens	1 episodes
2013	Raising Hope	Aaron	1 episode
2014	Mission Control	Gordie	TV movie
2015	Wet Hot American Summer: First Day of Camp	Warner	Miniseries; recurring role
2015	Mad Men	Bill Phillips	1 episode
2016	The Real O'Neals	Josh	1 episode
2016	Rosewood	Zachary wilford III	1 episode
2016	Criminal Minds	James O'Neill	Episode: "Drive"
2017	Amy's Brother	Neil	TV movie
2017	Wet Hot American Summer: Ten Years Later	Warner	Miniseries; recurring role
2017	Pharmacy Road	Finnish husband	TV movie
2017	Powerless	Scott	1 episode
2017–2019	One Day at a Time	Scott	7 episodes
2018	9-1-1	Brian	3 episodes
2018	Living Biblically	Mitch	Episode: "David and Goliath"
2018	Lucifer	Frederick Hoffman	Episode: "All Hands on Decker"
2018	The Mick	Wes	Episode: "The City"
2019	The Big Bang Theory	Neil	Episode: "The Donation Oscillation"
2019	The Politician	Detective	2 episodes
2019	Black-ish	Ryan Simmons	Episode: "FriDre Night Lights"
2019	Santa Clarita Diet	Larry	Episode: "Wuffenloaf"
2020	Medical Police	Collins	6 episodes
2020–2021	The Flash	Joseph Carver	4 episodes
2021	American Horror Story: Double Feature	Security	Episode: "The Future Perfect"
2023	Saturdays	Kev Jackson	Episode: "Don't Clown the Duchess"
2025	The Rookie	Dave	Episode: "Speed"
2026	Malcolm in the Middle: Life's Still Unfair	Eric Hanson	1 episode
