= Michael & Michael Have Issues =

- Series promotional intertitle
- Created by: Michael Ian Black; Michael Showalter
- Starring: Michael Ian Black; Michael Showalter; Josh Pais
- Country of origin: United States
- No. of seasons: 1
- No. of episodes: 7

Production
- Executive producers: Michael Ian Black; Michael Showalter; Lou Wallach; Jim Biederman
- Running time: 22 minutes

Original release
- Network: Comedy Central
- Release: July 15 – August 26, 2009

Michael & Michael Have Issues (sometimes abbreviated MMHI) is a cable television comedy series starring comedians and actors Michael Ian Black and Michael Showalter, who created the series. Both comedians appeared together in several TV comedy series, including The State, and Stella. The show premiered on July 15, 2009, on Comedy Central. Showalter and Black confirmed on March 3, 2010, via their Twitter accounts that the show had been canceled.

The series starred Michael Ian Black and Michael Showalter playing fictionalized versions of themselves. As stated in a 2009 New York Times article, "Mr. Black and Mr. Showalter play the bickering stars of a sketch comedy program who never miss an opportunity to undermine each other. In between skits about stores that sell only sweatpants and characters like John the British Fork Offerer, narrative segments chronicle the not-so-fictional frenemies who constantly step on each other’s toes, even in seemingly inconsequential situations like an interview for a high school newspaper or the search for a birthday gift for their producer."

== Characters ==
- Michael Ian Black (Michael Ian Black) – Michael plays a fictional version of himself, as well as a variety of characters.
- Michael Showalter (Michael Showalter) – Michael plays a fictional version of himself, as well as a variety of characters.
- Jim Biederman (Josh Pais) – Producer of the fictional show MMHI. Based on Jim Biederman, one of the producers of MMHI.
- Kumail (Kumail Nanjiani) – Pakistani staffer on MMHI.
- Marla Ratner (Jessi Klein) – Associate Producer of the fictional show MMHI.
- Lindsey (Susan Heyward) – Office assistant of Michael Ian Black and Michael Showalter.

=== Other characters ===
Episode one

- Greg the Intern (Matt Bennett)
- Jane (Diane Davis) – Michael Showalter's fictional girlfriend.
- Jen Biederman (Jennifer Biederman) – Biederman's wife.
- Christopher Meloni as himself
- Greg the Intern's father (Tom Daddario, comedian)

Episode two

- Nick (Leo Allen) – An editor on the show.
- Guy in office (Kumail Nanjiani)
- Newswoman (Andrea Rosen) – Newswoman on MMHI News.
- Vanessa (from the fifth floor) – Goes home from Biederman's party with Michael Showalter

Episode five

- Anna (Grace Helbig)

Other episodes

- Female Sketch Player (Arden Myrin)
- Michael Ian Black's wife (Amy Spanger)
- Pinecone Guy (Zak Orth)
- Male Sketch Player (Henry Zebrowski)
- Phyuck Yiu

== Episodes ==
No.	Title	Original release date	Prod. code
1	"Greg the Intern"	July 15, 2009	101
Jealousies flare when Black and Showalter battle for their intern's (Greg) admiration. Sketches: Teenage Abstinence.
2	"Biederman's Birthday"	July 22, 2009	102
What to give the boss who has everything? Pot. Sketches: King's Gift, Weatherman.
3	"Matchmakers"	July 29, 2009	103
Black and Showalter conspire to play cupid.
4	"Pulling Your Weight"	August 5, 2009	104
Black leaves the brunt of the workload for Showalter.
5	"College"	August 12, 2009	105
Black and Showalter secure a college gig.
6	"Sh... Bag House"	August 19, 2009	106
Showalter proves to be a problematic houseguest.
7	"Frogbox"	August 26, 2009	107
The guys agree to appear on a competing sketch show.

== Reception ==
The series received a mix of good and bad reviews. The Hartford Advocate stated that "With Michael and Michael Have Issues, they've made arguably perfect comedy for the Comedy Central audience, which is basically everyone." Randee Dawn of The Hollywood Reporter commented, "the Michaels have raw material in spades. Thus far, they haven't been able to harness it and make it consistently funny. For now, MMHI's real issue is that it's likely to be just another in a string of missed opportunities." In the Boston Globe, Joanna Weiss wrote, "Black and Showalter work together perfectly..." and "It’s a lot to cram into a measly half-hour, but each part - and each person - makes the other one funnier." IGN gave the first season a 7/10 stating that "it was a good season but never great" and that none of the episodes truly stood out.

Soon after the show was canceled, Comedy Central began airing reruns of the first season, to which Michael Ian Black responded via his Twitter account:

"Apparently Comedy Central is airing my canceled show right now, to which I graciously say, "FUCK YOU, Comedy Central."
