= Christopher Meloni =

American actor (born 1961)

- Meloni in 2026
- Born: Christopher Peter Meloni; April 2, 1961 (age 65); Washington, D.C., U.S.
- Other name: Chris Meloni
- Education: University of Colorado Boulder; Neighborhood Playhouse School of the Theatre
- Occupation: Actor
- Years active: 1989–present
- Spouse: Doris Sherman Williams (m. 1995)
- Children: 2

Christopher Peter Meloni (/məˈloʊni/; born April 2, 1961) is an American actor. He is known for portraying NYPD Detective Elliot Stabler on the NBC legal drama series Law & Order: Special Victims Unit (1999–2011, 2021–present) and its spin-off Organized Crime (2021–2025), for which he was nominated for a Primetime Emmy Award. He also played Chris Keller on the HBO prison drama Oz (1998–2003), and starred in and executive produced the Syfy series Happy! (2017–2019).

Meloni's film credits include 12 Monkeys (1995), Fear and Loathing in Las Vegas (1998), Runaway Bride (1999), Wet Hot American Summer (2001), Harold & Kumar Go to White Castle (2004), Green Lantern: First Flight (2009), 42 (2013), and Man of Steel (2013).

== Early life and education ==
Christopher Peter Meloni was born on April 2, 1961, in Washington, D.C., the youngest of three children of Cecile (née Chagnon; 1926–2016), a homemaker, and Charles Robert Meloni (1927–2012), an endocrinologist. He has an older brother and sister. His paternal ancestry is Italian; one great-grandfather was born in Sardinia and another was born in Velva, near Genoa. His maternal ancestry is French Canadian, and he is a descendant of Matthias Farnsworth and Edmund Rice.

Meloni attended St. Stephen's School, now St. Stephen's & St. Agnes School, in Alexandria, Virginia, where he was a quarterback on the football team. After graduating he attended the University of Colorado Boulder where he took acting classes for electives. He earned a Bachelor of Arts in history in 1983. After college, he went to New York continuing to study acting. He took classes with Sanford Meisner at the Neighborhood Playhouse School of the Theatre as well as at the Center for the Media Arts.

== Career ==
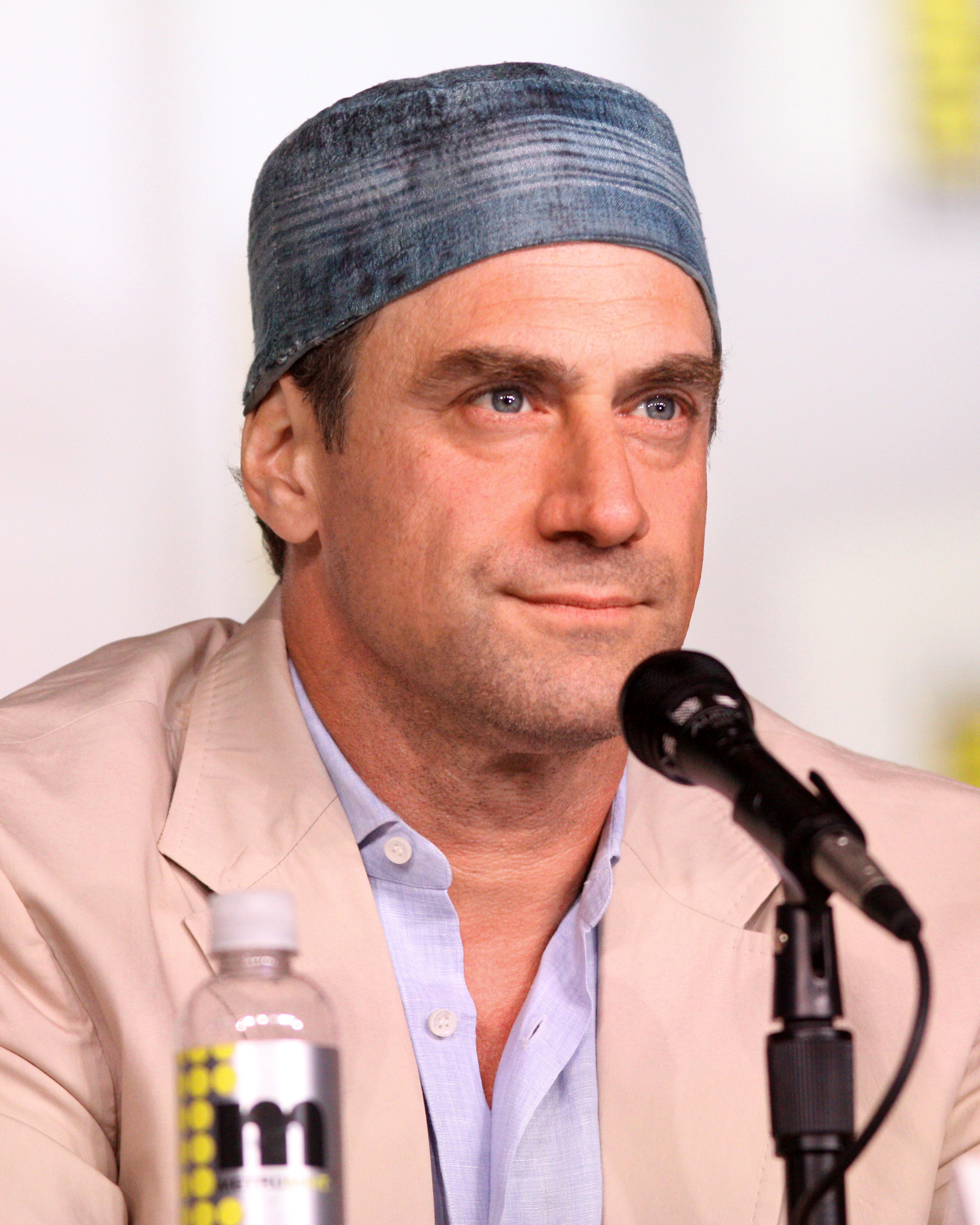
Meloni at San Diego Comic Con, 2012

Meloni acted in commercials, short-lived TV series, and bit parts in a number of films. His first noticeable role was the hotheaded son of a Mafia don in the 1996 thriller Bound. He appeared as Robbie Sinclair's friend Spike in Dinosaurs in the early 1990s. He played criminal Jimmy Liery in eight episodes of NYPD Blue during 1996–1997, and Bob Kelly, the fiancé of Julia Roberts's character Maggie Carpenter in the 1999 romantic comedy Runaway Bride.

From 1998 to 2003, Meloni portrayed the bisexual criminal Chris Keller on the HBO series Oz. Law & Order producer Dick Wolf signed Meloni to portray Elliot Stabler on Law & Order: Special Victims Unit in 1999. Meloni appeared on both Oz and Law & Order: SVU simultaneously until Oz was cancelled in 2003. Meloni was nominated for the 2006 Emmy Award for Outstanding Lead Actor in a Drama Series for his role as Elliot Stabler. In May 2011, Meloni announced that he had been unable to agree on a contract and would not be returning for season 13 of SVU. His character was written out as having put in his retirement papers. After nearly a decade, Meloni announced in March 2020 that he would be reprising his role of Stabler in the Law & Order franchise on a spin-off show titled Law & Order: Organized Crime. Meloni appeared in a crossover event during season 22 of SVU.

In 2012, Meloni joined the cast of True Blood during the series' fifth season as Roman, a "powerful, 500-year-old vampire who sits at the head of the table of the Vampire Authority."

Meloni played Colonel Hardy, a supporting role, in the Superman reboot film Man of Steel, which was released in 2013. That year, he played Brooklyn Dodgers manager Leo Durocher in the historical baseball feature 42. Meloni starred in the 2014 comedy They Came Together. He stars as John Taylor in the video game Call of Duty: Black Ops III. In 2016, Meloni shot the heist film Marauders.

Meloni starred in and executive produced the Syfy series Happy!, based on the comic book series created by writer Grant Morrison and artist Darick Robertson, which premiered in 2017. The series was canceled on June 4, 2019.

In 2018, Meloni guest starred in two episodes of the FX drama series Pose, opposite Dominique Jackson. He appeared on the third season of The Handmaid's Tale as Commander Winslow in 2019.

== Philanthropy ==
In 2004 and 2006, respectively, Meloni competed in the fourth and the eighth series of Bravo's Celebrity Poker Showdown; in the eighth series, he finished in second place, behind Robin Tunney, and ahead of Macy Gray, Joy Behar, and Andy Dick. He played for Feed the Children.

He appeared on Celebrity Jeopardy! on November 10, 2006, defeating fellow Law & Order stars Sam Waterston and Kathryn Erbe. Meloni split his $50,000 charity prize between the Big Apple Circus Clown Care Program and the Montefiore Advocacy Center. He also appeared on the program's Million Dollar Celebrity Invitational that aired on December 17, 2009. Although defeated by Joshua Malina and Harry Shearer, he won a $25,000 charity prize in the name of Smile Train.

== Public image ==
Meloni has appeared in many public service announcements in support of lesbian, gay, bisexual, and transgender issues. In 1999, Meloni jokingly kissed Lee Tergesen (who played Tobias Beecher, Meloni's on-screen boyfriend on Oz) at an awards dinner for GLAAD. In 2006, Meloni was given the Human Rights Campaign's Equality Award, along with actor Jake Gyllenhaal and director Ang Lee, for his work on behalf of LGBTQ issues. In addition, in 2011, Meloni appeared in the Human Rights Campaign's "New Yorkers for Marriage Equality" video.

Meloni was included in the 2006 edition of People magazine's Sexiest Men Alive.

== Personal life ==
Meloni married Doris Sherman Williams, a production designer, on July 1, 1995. They have two children through surrogacy, a daughter born in March 2001 and a son born in January 2004. Mariska Hargitay, who co-starred with Meloni on Law & Order: Special Victims Unit and remains close friends with him, is the godmother to his daughter.

Meloni has three tattoos: a Cubist-inspired representation of the crucifixion of Christ on his upper left arm, a butterfly on his left upper thigh, and a Chinese astrological chart of his family on his right lower leg. In 2007, Meloni was inducted into his high school's athletic Hall of Fame as a member of the undefeated 1978 football team, for which he was quarterback.

In 2014, Meloni bought the house used in the television show The Adventures of Ozzie and Harriet.

In 2021, on an episode of PBS' Finding Your Roots, it was revealed that Meloni is a distant relative of Nancy Pelosi.

Although raised Catholic, Meloni has stated that when he was around nine to eleven years old, he asked a nun for clarification on "Jesus and God and she couldn't give an answer. I was about nine, maybe 11. I was like, 'You know, I feel like I'm done.'"

== Filmography ==
=== Film ===
Year	Title	Role	Notes
1994	Clean Slate	Bodyguard	
1994	Junior	Mr. Lanzarotta	
1995	12 Monkeys	Lt. Halperin	
1996	Bound	Johnnie Marzzone	
1998	Brown's Requiem	Sgt. Cavanah	Uncredited
1998	Fear and Loathing in Las Vegas	Sven, Clerk at Flamingo Hotel	
1998	The Souler Opposite	Barry Singer	
1999	Carlo's Wake	Bennetto Torello	
1999	Runaway Bride	Bob Kelly	
2001	Wet Hot American Summer	Gene Jenkinson	
2002	That Brief Moment	Ken	Short film
2004	Harold & Kumar Go to White Castle	Freakshow	
2008	Harold & Kumar Escape from Guantanamo Bay	Grand Wizard	Credited as "Reverend Clyde Stanky"
2008	Nights in Rodanthe	Jack Willis	
2009	Brief Interviews with Hideous Men	R / Subject #3	
2009	Carriers	Frank	
2010	Green Lantern: First Flight	Hal Jordan / Green Lantern	Voice role
2011	National Lampoon's Dirty Movie	Producer Charlie LaRue	
2013	Awful Nice	Jon Charbineau	
2013	Man of Steel	Colonel Nathan Hardy	
2013	42	Leo Durocher	
2014	Beef	Lou	
2014	White Bird in a Blizzard	Brock Connors	
2014	Small Time	Al Klein	
2014	They Came Together	Roland	
2014	Sin City: A Dame to Kill For	Mort	
2015	The Diary of a Teenage Girl	Pascal MacCorkill	
2016	I Am Wrath	Dennis	
2016	Marauders	Agent Jonathan Montgomery	
2016	Almost Friends	Howard	
2017	Snatched	Roger Simmons	
2024	IF	Cosmo (voice)	
2026	Little Brother	Josh	

=== Television ===
Year	Title	Role	Notes
1989–1990	1st & Ten	Vito Del Greco / Johnny Gunn	11 episodes
1990	When Will I Be Loved?	Thomas the Tank Engine	TV film
1990–1991	The Fanelli Boys	Frankie Fanelli	17 episodes
1991	In a Child's Name	Jerry Cimarelli	TV film
1992	Something to Live for: The Alison Gertz Story	David	TV film
1991–1994	Dinosaurs	Spike	Voice; recurring role
1993	Without a Kiss Goodbye	Ray Samuels	TV film; aka Falsely Accused
1993	The Boys	Doug Kirkfield	6 episodes
1993	Golden Gate	Douglas "BW" Carlino	Unsold pilot
1995	A Dangerous Affair	Tommy Moretti	TV film
1995	Hope and Gloria	Billy	Episode: "Love with an Improper Stranger"
1995	Misery Loves Company	Mitch	8 episodes
1996–1997	NYPD Blue	Jimmy Liery	5 episodes
1997	The Last Don	Boz Skannet	Miniseries
1997	Leaving L.A.	Reed Sims	6 episodes
1997	Every 9 Seconds	Richard Sutherland	TV film
1997	Brooklyn South	Joe	3 episodes
1998	Target Earth	Detective Samuel "Sam" Adams	TV film
1998	Homicide: Life on the Street	Bounty Hunter Dennis Knoll	2 episodes
1998–2003	Oz	Chris Keller	Recurring (season 2); starring (seasons 3–6)
1999	Shift	Louis	TV film
1999–2011, 2021–2025	Law & Order: Special Victims Unit	Detective Elliot Stabler	Main (seasons 1–12); recurring (seasons 22–)
2000–2022	Law & Order	Detective Elliot Stabler	Guest role (seasons 10 & 22)
2002	Murder in Greenwich	Mark Fuhrman	TV film
2003	Scrubs	Dr. Dave Norris	Episode: "My White Whale"
2004	Sesame Street	Himself	Episode: 4065
2005	Wonder Showzen	Cooties Spokesman	Episode: "Health"
2005	Law & Order: Trial by Jury	Detective Elliot Stabler	Episode: "Day"
2008	Gym Teacher: The Movie	Dave Stewie	TV film
2009	Michael & Michael Have Issues	Himself	Episode: "Greg the Intern"
2010	Kathy Griffin: My Life on the D-List	Himself	Episode: "Kathy With a Z"
2011	The Daily Show with Jon Stewart	Tony Bologna	Cameo
2011	Ice Loves Coco	Himself	Cameo
2012	True Blood	Roman Zimojic	5 episodes
2013	Comedy Bang! Bang!	Dr. Phillip Banhauser	Episode: "Aziz Ansari Wears a Charcoal Blazer"
2014	Veep	Ray Whelans	2 episodes
2014	Surviving Jack	Jack Dunlevy	8 episodes (including one unaired episode in the United States)
2015	Drunk History	Othniel Marsh	Episode: "New Jersey"
2015	The Jack and Triumph Show	Agent Ryker	Episode: "Siri"
2015	Wet Hot American Summer: First Day of Camp	Gene Jenkinson / Jonas Jurgenson	6 episodes
2016–2017	Underground	August Pullman	Recurring role; directed episode: "Auld Acquaintance"
2017	Wet Hot American Summer: Ten Years Later	Gene Jenkinson	4 episodes
2017	At Home with Amy Sedaris	Ranger Russell	Episode: "Nature"
2017–2019	Happy!	Nick Sax	Recurring role
2018	Pose	Dick Ford	2 episodes
2019	The Handmaid's Tale	Commander Winslow	4 episodes
2019–2022	American Dad!	Various voices	3 episodes
2019–present	Harley Quinn	Jim Gordon, Two-Face, other voices	Recurring role
2020	Family Guy	George Townshend (voice)	Episode: "Short Cuts"
2020	Maxxx	Don Wild	6 episodes
2020	The Twilight Zone	Robert	Episode: "A Human Face"
2020	Helpsters	Detective Dudley	Episode: "Camper Cortez/Artist Andrew & Detective Dudley"
2020–2022	Rick and Morty	Jesus Christ (voice)	2 episodes
2021	Cinema Toast	(voice)	Episode: "One Gay Wedding and a Thousand Funerals"
2021	Bless the Harts	Detective Voccola (voice)	Episode: "Betty's Birthday"
2021–2025	Law & Order: Organized Crime	Detective Elliot Stabler	Main role; also executive producer
2022	Solar Opposites	Lonesun (voice)	Episode: "Terry and Korvo Get in a Big Screaming Fight in the Taco Bell Parking Lot"
2023	Captain Fall	Agent Steel (voice)	Recurring role
2023	Celebrity Jeopardy!	Himself	Contestant
2025	Universal Basic Guys	Thunderhead (voice)	Episode: "Skyboys"
2027	The Land	Danny Roarke	Main role

=== Video games ===
Year	Title	Role	Notes
2015	Call of Duty: Black Ops III	John Taylor	Voice

== Awards and nominations ==
Year	Award	Category	Work	Result
1999	OFTA Television Awards	Best Guest Actor in a Cable Series	Oz	Won
2004	Prism Awards	Best Performance in a TV Drama Series Episode	Law & Order: Special Victims Unit	Nominated
2006	OFTA Television Awards	Best Actor in a Drama Series	Law & Order: Special Victims Unit	Nominated
2006	Primetime Emmy Awards	Outstanding Lead Actor in a Drama Series	Law & Order: Special Victims Unit	Nominated
2008	Prism Awards	Best Performance in a TV Drama Series Episode	Law & Order: Special Victims Unit	Nominated
2009	Prism Awards	Best Performance in a TV Drama Series Episode	Law & Order: Special Victims Unit	Nominated
2014	Gold Derby Awards	Best Comedy Guest Actor	Veep	Nominated
2019	Gold Derby Awards	Best Drama Guest Actor	Pose	Nominated
2019	International Online Cinema Awards	Best Guest Actor in a Drama Series	Pose	Nominated
2021	Hollywood Critics Association Television Awards	Best Actor in a Broadcast Network or Cable Series, Drama	Law & Order: Organized Crime	Nominated
2022	ACCEC Awards	Favorite Television Actor	Law & Order: Organized Crime	Won
