= Search Party season 5 =

Search Party
- Season 5
- Official promotional poster
- Starring: Alia Shawkat; John Paul Reynolds; John Early; Meredith Hagner
- No. of episodes: 10

Release
- Original network: HBO Max
- Original release: January 7, 2022

Season chronology
- ← Previous; Season 4

The fifth and final season of American dark comedy series Search Party was released on HBO Max on January 7, 2022. The season consists of ten episodes, each with an approximate running time of 25 minutes.

Season five centers Dory's surreal journey of self-discovery to search for enlightenment in the wake of her near-death experience (shown in the finale of season four) and an extended stay at a psychiatric facility. She collaborates with a tech billionaire to develop an enlightenment pill, which leads her to become a cult leader.

The season received positive reception and holds a 100% rating on Rotten Tomatoes.

== Plot ==
"Search Party Season 5 sees Dory dive into the new age movement in order to search for enlightenment on the other side of her near-death experience. Dory enters a very public business partnership with charismatic tech billionaire Tunnel Quinn to develop an enlightenment pill and make amends with her old friends Portia, Elliott, and Drew, who folds them into the venture as they embark on an altruistic, but terrifying journey of self-discovery."

== Cast ==
=== Main ===
- Alia Shawkat as Dory Sief
- John Reynolds as Drew Gardner
- John Early as Elliott Goss
- Meredith Hagner as Portia Davenport

=== Recurring ===
- Clare McNulty as Chantal Witherbottom
- Jefferey Self as Marc, Elliott's romantic partner
- Jeff Goldblum as Tunnel Quinn, a tech billionaire
- Kathy Griffin as Liquorice, a conspiracy theorist who claims to receive letters from the future
- Kayden Alexander Koshelev as Aspen, Elliott and Marc's adoptive son
- Aparna Nancherla as Dr. Benny Balthazar
- Angela Trimbur as Elodie Revlon
- Grace Kuhlenschmidt as Pepper Southerland
- Greta Titelman as Leonora Hamsdale
- Joe Castle Baker as Marty Plushfeld
- Larry Owens as Ritchie Thinky
- Michelle Badillo as Winnie Miranda
- Constance Shulman as Helen
- Brian O'Neill as Mick
- John Waters as Sheffield, the head of a boutique adoption agency
- Rosemary Harris as archduchess Beatrice Hamsdale
- Trudy Styler as duchess Winnifred Hamsdale, a character based on Catherine Oxenberg
- Sean Allan Krill as Sydney Muscat, UNN News Anchor

=== Guest starring ===
- Jimmy Fowlie as Dogey
- Damian Young as Bob Steelhead
- Illeana Douglas, Lou Diamond Phillips, Scott Adsit, Michael Ian Black and Denise Cormier as the members of the Jesper Society
- Naomi Ekperigin and Joe Pera as coroners
- Abby Elliott as Dr. Baby
- Christine Taylor as Gail
- Griffin Newman as Gavin

== Episodes ==
No. overall	No. in season	Title	Directed by	Written by	Original release date
41	1	"Genesis"	John Lee	Sarah-Violet Bliss & Charles Rogers	January 7, 2022
As Dory embarks on an enlightened new path in the wake of her near-death experience, Portia, Elliott, and Drew notice a disconcerting change in Dory, leading the gang to contemplate how to move forward in life, work, and love.
42	2	"Exodus"	John Lee	Sarah-Violet Bliss & Charles Rogers	January 7, 2022
As she amasses a substantial new following for her controversial spiritual guidance, Dory spreads the word about her enlightenment while attempting to make amends with her friends for what happened, resulting in a day full of suspicions, confessions, and possibilities.
43	3	"Kings"	John Lee	Starlee Kine	January 7, 2022
Dory invites the gang to a meeting of the minds with tech billionaire Tunnel Quinn, giving them a chance to talk to someone with power. Meanwhile, Elliott and Marc start to harbor serious suspicions about their unsettlingly adopted son, Aspen.
44	4	"Leviticus"	Heather Jack	Andrew Pierce Fleming & Matt Kriete	January 7, 2022
As the Tunnel Industry scientists work on the technology behind their highly anticipated enlightenment pill, Dory and her gang kick off a nationwide search for their first recipients: six influencers eager to be Dory's disciples.
45	5	"Acts of the Apostles"	Heather Jack	Craig Rowin	January 7, 2022
Dory makes a shocking discovery about the status of the Lyte pill with help from Elliott's sleuthing. At the same time, her disciples take drastic measures that call her beliefs and everything she knows into question, proving their loyalty to the cause.
46	6	"The Gospel of Judas"	John Lee	Andrew Pierce Fleming & Matt Kriete	January 7, 2022
As she oversees a pupil's research, Dory becomes increasingly unwell – and begins to suspect that she's being poisoned from within, while Drew casts doubt upon some of her teachings to answers about Dory's time at the mental hospital.
47	7	"Book of the Wars of the Lord"	John Lee	Sarah-Violet Bliss & Charles Rogers	January 7, 2022
The FBI descends upon Lyte Headquarters as Dory orchestrates a precarious hostage situation. While her fellow disciples race against time to finish the pill's formula, Portia attempts to get back in Dory's good graces.
48	8	"Song of Songs"	Sarah-Violet Bliss & Charles Rogers	Starlee Kine	January 7, 2022
After pulling off a grand illusion, Dory's enlightenment brigade prepares to take the pills. Meanwhile, in the wake of a jaw-dropping revelation, Chantal takes steps to fend off the end of the world.
49	9	"Lamentations"	Sarah-Violet Bliss & Charles Rogers	Craig Rowin	January 7, 2022
When one of Dory's followers has an alarming reaction after discovering the pills' grisly side effects, the rest of the squad scrambles to save themselves – and humanity as they know it – before it's too late.
50	10	"Revelation"	Sarah-Violet Bliss & Charles Rogers	Sarah-Violet Bliss & Charles Rogers	January 7, 2022
With New York City under siege, the gang finds themselves crossing paths with an unlikely savior in their desperate fight for survival as they hope that everyone can be saved.

== Production ==
=== Development ===
HBO Max renewed Search Party for a fifth season on February 9, 2021. On November 9, 2021, it was announced that the season would be released on January 7, 2022 and that it would be the final season. Series co-creators Sarah-Violet Bliss, Charles Rogers, and Michael Showalter remained as co-executive producers with Lilly Burns and Tony Hernandez.

Rogers and Bliss focused season five's plot on the themes of rebirth and enlightenment as the logical next step after the season four finale, in which Dory is technically dead for a momentary period. They studied personal accounts of near-death experiences as well as media related to cults and cult leaders. Dory's spiritual leader persona was also inspired by public figures including Deepak Chopra, Bhagwan Shree Rajneesh, Marianne Williamson, and Ram Dass. Rogers and Bliss described Dory's descent into becoming a cult leader with good intentions as a "full circle" transition from season one, when her altruism also transformed into narcissism.

The season was shot in New York and production wrapped in the summer of 2021.

=== Casting ===
Jeff Goldblum was cast in a recurring role on July 8, 2021, followed by the casting of Kathy Griffin, also recurring, on August 11, 2021.

On November 29, 2021 the casting of recurring cast members Angela Trimbur, Grace Kuhlenschmidt, Greta Titelman, Joe Castle Baker, Larry Owens, Michelle Badillo, and Aparna Nancherla was announced.

=== Release ===
The season premiered on HBO Max on January 7, 2022 with all ten episodes released simultaneously.

== Critical reception ==
Season five of Search Party received positive critical reception. It holds a 100% on Rotten Tomatoes with an average rating of 8.1/10 based on ten critics' reviews. Naveen Kumar of them. hailed the series: "Among a swelling array of TV shows that lampoon navel-gazing Millennials, Search Party has stood out for its mordant humor, razor-sharp wit, and pitch-black plot." The A.V. Club's Saloni Gajjar rated the season a B+ and described it positively: "The HBO Max comedy dials up the absurdity in the last few episodes of season five, mostly pulling off a whiplash-inducing third act pivot like no other TV show can, thanks to a virtuoso but vastly underrated cast."

The performance of the main cast was praised by several critics. Series co-creator Sarah-Violet Bliss commended Alia Shawkat's performance as lead character Dory Sief throughout the five seasons: "The comedy was on the page, but when I had imagined the character, she was a little bit less self-possessed. What Alia brought was intelligence and maturity — she made her grounded and real."

Critics noted that the series continued to bend genres, as it has taken on the style of true crime, legal drama, noir, horror, and psychological thriller across the first four seasons. Time writer Judy Berman characterized season five as "surreal sci-fi", fantasy, and a "strange existential comedy." The unusual tone was described as "frankly, bananas" in Thrillist.

Slash writer Valerie Ettenhofer stated that the season's satirical focus is consistent with the overall series: "No matter how pie-in-the-sky it gets, "Search Party' is still, at its core, a biting satire about the rich and soulless...In the season premiere, Elliott makes plain the type of hollowness the series loves to poke at, saying gleefully, "We're adults, and adults don't care about making a difference!"" Esther Zuckerman of Thrillist described the characters as those who "want fulfillment by cutting corners. They don't want to do the work. They want an easy fix—something outside of themselves that will cure their unending melancholy."

Brian Tallerico of The Playlist described the season as "inconsistent as the show has ever been in terms of plotting and theme" but praised the show's humor, "insane structure", and twist ending. Multiple critics connected the off-the-wall tone and plotting to the destabilizing and unprecedented events that took place in the United States between Search Party's 2016 debut and 2022 finale. Daniel Kurland rated the season 5/5 stars in a review for Den of Geek, and further praised the ending: "I’m still a little speechless for the direction that Search Party ultimately takes and where it ends. The story reaches a ridiculous place, but the world has become so destabilizing that Search Party’s bold choices actually work and come across as smart satire."
