= Search Party season 4 =

Search Party
- Season 4
- Official season 4 promotional poster
- Starring: Alia Shawkat; John Paul Reynolds; John Early; Meredith Hagner
- No. of episodes: 10

Release
- Original network: HBO Max
- Original release: January 14 – January 28, 2021

Season chronology
- ← Previous; Season 3 Next → Season 5

The fourth season of Search Party began airing on January 14, 2021 on HBO Max. It was the first season to be produced exclusively by the streaming service after its move from TBS. The showrunners are co-creators Charles Rogers and Sarah-Violet Bliss. The first three episodes were released on January 14, 2021, episodes 4-6 were released on January 21, and the final four episodes were released on January 28.

The show picks up after Dory was last seen kidnapped by an obsessive superfan, Chip. He keeps her locked in his aunt's padded basement and insists her friends were a bad influence. Drew hides out of state working at an amusement park; Elliott is hired to become a right-wing pundit on a cable news show; and Portia portrays Dory in a film based on the murder trial. After they realize she is missing, the trio begins to search for Dory.

The season received mainly positive critical reception and holds a 95% on Rotten Tomatoes.

== Plot ==
Having been kidnapped by twink superfan Chip in the season 3 finale, Dory awakens in the home of Chip's Aunt Lylah located in the fictional Babyfoot, Massachusetts. He locks Dory in the basement, which has been designed to be a padded replica of her Brooklyn apartment. Chip insists Dory is his best friend and that her friends are a bad influence.

Back in New York, Portia and Elliott are upset that Dory is nowhere to be found. They find a handwritten letter from Dory, actually written by Chip, which states she's going to Europe and no longer wants to be friends with them. They become angry and leave her a withering voicemail. Elliott becomes a homophobic Christian conservative news pundit on his own show and enjoys his newfound fame. Portia is cast as Dory in Savage: The Dory Sief Story, a film about the murder trial, but the director Lassie Kazaar hates her acting. Drew goes to work at an out of state theme park called Merry Merry Land. He works with his new girlfriend, Cindy.

Dory tries to escape but every ploy falls through. Eventually, Dory accepts Chip's insistence that she is innocent of any crime and displays symptoms of Stockholm syndrome. She begins wearing a blonde wig and using the name Stephanie. She and Chip go to a local ice cream parlor dressed as Stephanie and Aunt Lylah when she sees Marc, Elliott's ex-fiancé.

The three are unaware that Dory may be in harm's way until Chip posts a photoshopped Instagram picture of Dory at the Leaning Tower of Pisa wearing a sweater that Drew knows he put in storage. He moves back to Brooklyn to search for Dory with Elliott and Portia. At a convenience store, they see Chip's face on a package of Lil Sticky's cinnamon buns and they reach out to the company via Twitter. The company's married executives Richard and Gertrude Wreck claim that the photo on the packaging is not Chip, but privately express anxiety that Chip may be involved in the kidnapping. It is revealed that Chip is a product of incest, the son of Lylah and Richard.

Elliott, Portia, and Drew see that Marc just posted a photo of him and Dory on Instagram. After speaking to Marc, the trio go to Babyfoot. There, Drew spots Dory in Chip's car, but when Dory sees them, she jumps out of the car and runs into the woods. They catch up to her, take her to a hotel, and because she is threatening to kill them, tie her to a bed.

Chantal writes a book and is upset when she's told that it's awful. In an angry fit, Chantal throws the book off the roof of the building. Wilma, a talk show host, picks up the book and loves it. She assumes it was written by a 10 year old girl. When Chantal arrives at the show as the author, Wilma is bewildered.

Tied to the hotel bed, Dory watches Chantal on Wilma's show and remembers the events that Chip brainwashed out of her. Dory leaves her friends eating at a diner and drives to Lylah's house. Drew's girlfriend Cindy arrives with his family to perform an elaborate wedding proposal, which he refuses. Dory asks Chip to transform her back into Stephanie but he refuses. Aunt Lylah locks Dory in the basement and burns down the house. As she suffocates from the smoke Dory has a flashback that reveals that she almost escaped when Chip first kidnapped her but voluntarily stayed in captivity.

Dory's family and friends gather at a memorial for her, as she is presumed dead from the fire. The trio go back to Portia's apartment and find a box from Chip that contains several of Dory's personal items. On a video camera, they find a clip addressed to them that Dory left before she perished in the fire.

The last scene shows Dory soot covered and coughing on a gurney, where she has been rescued from the house fire.

== Cast and characters ==
=== Main ===
- Alia Shawkat as Dory Sief
- John Reynolds as Drew Gardner
- John Early as Elliott Goss
- Meredith Hagner as Portia Davenport

=== Recurring ===
- Cole Escola as Chip Wreck, a wealthy, psychotic man obsessed with Dory
- Chloe Fineman as Charlie Reeny, a young conservative news pundit
- Tami Sagher as Lassie Kazaar, the director of the Dory Sief film
- Rebecca Robles as Cindy, Drew's new girlfriend and another employee at Merry Merry Land
- Clare McNulty as Chantal Witherbottom

=== Guest ===
- Susan Sarandon as Lylah, Chip's aunt and secretly his mother
- Brandon Micheal Hall as Julian Marcus
- Ann Dowd as Paula Jo, Aunt Lylah's neighbor
- Busy Philipps as Donna DiMarco, the actress cast as Portia in the Dory Sief film
- Benito Skinner as Nate, the actor cast as Elliott in the Dory Sief film
- Griffin Dunne as Richard Wreck, the CEO of Lil Sticky's and Chip's father
- Deborah Rush as Gertrude, Richard's wife
- Lillias White as Wilma, a television talk show host who finds Chantal's unpublished manuscript
- R. L. Stine as himself
- Kate Berlant as Nia Carpourtalas
- Christine Ebersole as Mariel Davenport
- Christine Taylor as Gail

== Production ==
The season's showrunners are co-creators Sarah-Violet Bliss and Charles Rogers, who executive produced with Michael Showalter, Lilly Burns, and Tony Hernandez. The season was the first exclusively produced by HBO Max. Filming took place from December 2019 to February 2020.

Rogers stated that they intended the fourth season to be "the darkest season yet." The writers were influenced by Misery and did not know where they would take the character of Chip when they wrote him into the third season.

== Release ==
The season debuted with the first three episodes released simultaneously on January 14, 2021. Episodes 4-6 were released on January 21, and the final four episodes (7-10) were released on January 28.

== Episodes ==
No. overall	No. in season	Title	Directed by	Written by	Original release date
31	1	"The Girl in the Basement"	Sarah-Violet Bliss & Charles Rogers	Sarah-Violet Bliss & Charles Rogers	January 14, 2021
Dory wakes up to a terrifying new reality, while Portia, Elliott, and Drew grow impatient with their seemingly AWOL "friend."
32	2	"Something Sharp"	Sarah-Violet Bliss & Charles Rogers	Christina Lee	January 14, 2021
Dory tries to break out of her felt prison, Drew starts a new life at a theme park, Portia auditions for the film adaption of the trial, and Elliott reconsiders his political beliefs for a chance to host his own talk show.
33	3	"Escape to Nowhere"	Sarah-Violet Bliss & Charles Rogers	Emily Heller	January 14, 2021
Drew's deep, dark, secret is discovered by his new-found love, Portia works on her movie, Elliot works with Charlie in his new political party, and Dory and Chip celebrate three months of friendship.
34	4	"Home Again, Home Again, Jiggity-Jig"	Sarah-Violet Bliss & Charles Rogers	Jordan Firstman	January 21, 2021
Chip drags Dory back to the house, where a nosy Paula Jo awaits. Drew rushes back to New York after seeing something strange on social, Portia has a bleak first day on set, and Elliott gains even more notoriety.
35	5	"Doctor Mindbender"	John Lee	Matt Kriete & Andrew Pierce Fleming	January 21, 2021
Chip feeds Dory his own version of the events that brought them together, while the gang takes a closer look into Dory's absence.
36	6	"The Thoughtless Woman"	John Lee	Starlee Kine	January 21, 2021
Dory's finally at peace in her new home - but she doesn't quite feel like herself anymore. The gang's search takes them to the Lil Sticky's factory, where owners Richard and Gertrude give them the red-carpet treatment.
37	7	"The Infinite Loop"	Sarah-Violet Bliss & Charles Rogers	Matt Kriete & Andrew Pierce Fleming	January 28, 2021
The real Lylah appears, and the gang finally gets a solid lead on Dory's whereabouts.
38	8	"The Imposter"	Alia Shawkat	Starlee Kine	January 28, 2021
After bringing her family to financial ruin, Chantal is inspired to tell her life story. Dory sees something on TV that reminds her who she is.
39	9	"The Inferno"	Sarah-Violet Bliss & Charles Rogers	Sarah-Violet Bliss & Charles Rogers	January 28, 2021
Dory struggles with reality after being brainwashed. Drew gets a surprise. Lylah puts the final touch on her cover-up.
40	10	"The Shadows"	Sarah-Violet Bliss & Charles Rogers	Sarah-Violet Bliss & Charles Rogers	January 28, 2021
Drew, Elliott, and Portia must come to terms with their loss.

== Reception ==
The season received positive critical reception and holds a 95% rating on review aggregator Rotten Tomatoes as of May 2021. Rachel Syme reviewed the season positively for The New Yorker: "The season is part “Room” and part “Silence of the Lambs,” while still maintaining its sardonic, quippy tone. The result is a truly absurdist, effervescently trippy ride."

Joshua Rivera wrote for The Verge that the show continues to skewer "coddled, internet-ruined millennials", and noted the lead character Dory is now "imprisoned by the sort of parasocial relationship she first formed with her missing classmate and then encouraged others to build with her."

Alia Shawkat's acting was praised by Inkoo Kang of The Hollywood Reporter: "Escola and Shawkat make for fantastic scene partners, and the actress in particular seems determined to showcase her wondrous range this season." Lexi Lane of NBCNews.com also praised guest star Cole Escola and wrote, "the show asks viewers to contemplate whether he and Dory actually have very similar personalities in terms of both their extreme denial about their actions and, perhaps, their affinity for wearing wigs in public."

Mashable writer Proma Khosla referred positively to the season's plot development, "The season illustrates yet another art of which Search Party never failed to flex its mastery: escalation. Few shows succeed at the task of inflating or complicating conflict...but we see this with every season, every episode of Search Party."

Bitch co-founder Andi Zeisler and writer Marina Watanabe noted parallels between Elliott Goss' conservative persona and actual right-wing pundits: "This feels especially relevant when we’re hearing stories of GOP members who have publicly defended Trump for years but not-so-secretly hate his guts."

Critics noted that the series continues to cross genres, and it exhibits aspects of thriller, horror, and dark comedy.
