= Charles Rogers (director) =

American film director (born 1987)

- Born: July 5, 1987 (age 39); Dallas, Texas, US
- Education: New York University
- Occupations: Film director; screenwriter; producer; actor
- Years active: 2012–present

Charles Rogers (born July 5, 1987) is an American film director, screenwriter, producer and actor best known for his movie Fort Tilden (2014) and the TBS / HBO Max series Search Party which ran from 2016 to 2022, and for co-creating the upcoming drama series The Band, currently in development at HBO.

He served as a writer and co-executive producer on the Ryan Murphy produced FX television adaptation of Brett Easton Ellis's novel The Shards, and was also as a writer for the Netflix comedy series, Wet Hot American Summer: First Day of Camp (2015), and Wet Hot American Summer: Ten Years Later (2017).

Rogers has earned notoriety and acclaim as one of the major LGBTQ showrunners in Hollywood. He has earned recognition from Forbes 30 Under 30, The Hollywood Reporter, and Variety. In 2017 he was one of Out Magazine 100 most compelling LGBT people in 2017.

== Early life and education ==
Rogers is a graduate of the New York University Tisch School of the Arts MFA film directing program.

== Career ==
=== Fort Tilden ===
In 2014, he co-wrote and co-directed Fort Tilden in collaboration with Sarah-Violet Bliss. Starring Bridey Elliott and Clare McNulty, the film premiered at SXSW, where it won the Grand Jury Award and was subsequently acquired by Orion Pictures.

Fort Tilden centers on two inept best friends on a disastrous journey to the beach. It was released on August 14, 2015, theatrically and through video on demand. The film received generally positive reviews from major critics.

Andy Webster of The New York Times said that "rarely has a movie so humorously illustrated the meaning of 'frenemy'", David Edelstein of New York Magazine called Fort Tilden "a brisk comedy packed with sharply drawn characters", and Katie Walsh of the Los Angeles Times said that the film "has an easy, funky groove and captures the sweaty perfection of a New York City summer, where things always look better on Instagram".

=== Search Party ===
Rogers created the cult hit dark comedy television series, Search Party, along with Sarah-Violet Bliss and Michael Showalter. The show stars Alia Shawkat, John Early, John Reynolds, Meredith Hagner and Brandon Micheal Hall as a group of millennial hipsters who become involved in the search for a missing young woman and the escalating events that result from their involvement.

The series featured guest stars Cole Escola, Jeff Goldblum, Susan Sarandon, Parker Posey, Louie Anderson, Ron Livingston, Christine Taylor, Rosie Perez, J. Smith-Cameron, Michaela Watkins, Clare McNulty, and Jeffery Self.

Search Party premiered on TBS on November 21, 2016. Following the first two seasons, Search Party moved to HBO Max for the remainder of its run. It concluded on January 7, 2022, after five seasons. The series received critical acclaim, holding a 100% approval rating on review aggregator website Rotten Tomatoes, based on 20 reviews, with an average rating of 8.1/10.

Critical response of Charles Rogers
Season	Rotten Tomatoes	Metacritic
1	100% (38 reviews)	81 (19 reviews)
2	96% (27 reviews)	78 (9 reviews)
3	93% (28 reviews)	78 (10 reviews)
4	95% (22 reviews)	68 (5 reviews)
5	100% (13 reviews)	82 (4 reviews)

The first season received positive reviews from television critics. Los Angeles Times wrote that it was "tightly made and effective on multiple levels". GQ wrote that it is "a flawless oddity, a once-in-a-lifetime piece of art. It's not the weekend's best show, it's the year's best." It holds a 100% approval rating on Rotten Tomatoes. The site's critical consensus reads "Search Party is an engaging, weird, dark, funny mystery elevated by exceptional performances throughout." On Metacritic, the season holds a rating of 81 out of 100, indicating "universal acclaim". The show earned a nomination for the 2017 Gotham Independent Film Award for Breakthrough Series – Long Form.

The second season of Search Party received positive reviews from television critics. It holds a 96% approval rating on Rotten Tomatoes. The site's critical consensus reads "With a never-better Alia Shawkat in the lead, Search Party's second season delves deeper into the deliciously dark dramedy that makes the show so addictively entertaining." On Metacritic, the season holds a rating of 78 out of 100, indicating "generally favorable reviews".

The third season of Search Party received positive reviews from television critics. It holds a 93% approval rating on Rotten Tomatoes. The site's critical consensus reads "Search Party's third season changes the satirical scenery without losing any of its bite, while giving its capable cast plenty of moments to shine." On Metacritic, the season holds a rating of 78 out of 100, indicating "generally favorable reviews".

Following the final season, The New York Times critic Dave Itzkoff summarised that the show "evolved from a low-fi if knowing satire of youthful narcissism into an unexpectedly intricate and baroque series, free to follow its muse down some very dark corridors." Mashable's Proma Khosla hailed it as "one of the most impeccable, twisted, and incisive comedies in years." Critics praised the show for its depiction of millennial adulthood in the increasingly fractious society of late 2010s America. Time critic Judy Berman remarked "In its journey from realism to absurdity, Search Party captured something that an Obama-era show like Girls—which, like its predecessor Sex and the City, quickly aged into triviality—never could." Chris Vanjonack of Electric Literature wrote "[b]e it climate collapse, an AI apocalypse, an even more virulent variant, or, god forbid, nuclear war, the show’s writers dare us to imagine what we might look like inside of those moments of crisis, forcing us to consider that even in the face of certain death, we’ll be stuck with all the worst parts of ourselves."

=== Other film and TV work ===
Along with Jordan Firstman, he co-wrote and co-starred in the short film Men Don't Whisper, which was an official selection at the 2018 Sundance Film Festival as well as the 2018 South by Southwest Film Festival. The film follows a gay couple with masculinity issues who attempt to sleep with women. Produced by JASH, it also stars Fort Tilden and Search Party actors Bridey Elliott and Clare McNulty, and features a guest appearance by Saturday Night Live alum Cheri Oteri.

In addition to his work on Search Party, Rogers has worked as a writer on the first and second seasons of the Netflix series Wet Hot American Summer, as well as for the second season of the Amazon series Mozart in the Jungle which won the Golden Globe Award for Best Television Series – Musical or Comedy.

He was one of the filmmakers behind the multi-director feature film Black Dog, Red Dog, produced by James Franco and Rabbit Bandini Productions, starring Logan Marshall-Green, Chloë Sevigny, and Whoopi Goldberg, which premiered at the 2015 International Film Festival of Guanajuato. The film was a class project at the NYU graduate film program, taught by Franco, wherein ten students adapted the poetry of Stephen Dobyns.

=== Podcasts ===
Rogers, along with comedian and multimedia artist Casey Jane Ellison, co-hosted the Earwolf produced limited series podcast The Problem with Charles and Casey which premiered on March 31, 2019. The podcast featured in-depth interviews with guests, including Louie Anderson, Jessica Williams, Starlee Kine, Jordan Firstman, and Chelsea Peretti, about a problem they are facing in their lives.

Rogers has appeared twice as a guest on the pop-culture and comedy podcast Las Culturistas, with Matt Rogers and Bowen Yang. He has also appeared on the NPR radio show All Things Considered, hosted by Ari Shapiro, to discuss his satirical political campaign on Instagram for a fake senator named Anne Ranch. He has appeared twice on the film podcast Blank Check with Griffin & David, hosted by Griffin Newman and David Sims.

=== Controversies ===
In January 2024, TheWrap published allegations that Rogers drugged and sexually assaulted a Search Party production assistant in 2020. According to TheWrap, Rogers was cleared of wrongdoing by HBO Max's investigation into the incident in 2020, which found no evidence to corroborate the allegations. During the investigation, the production assistant retracted his claims and sent Rogers an email exonerating him, as he believed his claims to be related to "severe" psychotic delusions he was experiencing during that timeframe. He later alleged that the network gaslit him into making a retraction. Rogers has also denied the allegations.

== Filmography ==
=== Film ===
Year	Title	Role	Notes
2014	Fort Tilden	Director / Writer	Feature film debut
2015	Black Dog, Red Dog	Director / Writer	Feature film
2017	Men Don't Whisper	Writer / Actor	Short film

=== Television ===
Year	Title	Creator	Writer	Director	Executive producer	Notes
2015	Wet Hot American Summer: First Day of Camp	No	Yes	No	No	Staff writer
2016	Mozart in the Jungle	No	Yes	No	No	Staff writer
2016–2022	Search Party	Yes	Yes (19)	Yes (30)	Yes	
2017	Wet Hot American Summer: Ten Years Later	No	Yes (1)	No	Consulting	Episode: "Lunch"
2026–present	The Shards	No	Yes (5)	No	Co-executive	
2026–present	All's Fair	No	Yes (6)	No	Co-executive	

== Recognition ==
- 2017 – Forbes named him one of Forbes 30 Under 30 in the Hollywood and Entertainment section
- 2017 – Out Magazine named him one of the 100 most compelling LGBT people.
- 2017 – The Hollywood Reporter named Rogers and Bliss as one of the "Hollywood Power Showrunners: Ones To Watch"
- 2016 – Variety named Rogers and Bliss one of "10 Writers to Watch".

== Awards and nominations ==
Year	Association	Category	Project	Result	Ref.
2014	Chicago International Film Festival	Audience Choice Award	Fort Tilden	Nominated	
2014	SXSW Film Festival	Grand Jury Award – Narrative Feature	Fort Tilden	Won	
2014	Athens International Film Festival	Best Picture	Fort Tilden	Nominated	
2014	Little Rock Film Festival	Best Feature Film	Fort Tilden	Nominated	
2016	Gotham Award	Breakthrough Series – Longform	Search Party	Nominated	
