= Search Party (TV series) =

2016 American dark comedy series

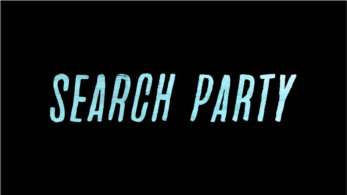
- Genre: Dark comedy
- Created by: Sarah-Violet Bliss; Charles Rogers; Michael Showalter
- Starring: Alia Shawkat; John Reynolds; John Early; Meredith Hagner
- Opening theme: "Obedear" by Purity Ring
- Composers: Brian H. Kim (season 1); Daniel Wohl (seasons 2–5)
- Country of origin: United States
- Original language: English
- No. of seasons: 5
- No. of episodes: 50

Production
- Executive producers: Sarah-Violet Bliss; Charles Rogers; Michael Showalter; Tony Herandez; Lilly Burns
- Producers: Brittney Segal; Jake Fuller; Alia Shawkat; John Skidmore
- Production locations: Brooklyn, New York City
- Cinematography: Jonathan Furmanski
- Camera setup: Single-camera
- Running time: 22–30 minutes
- Production companies: Jax Media; Quiet and Considerate Productions; Semi-Formal Productions; Studio T

Original release
- Network: TBS
- Release: November 21, 2016 – December 17, 2017
- Network: HBO Max
- Release: June 25, 2020 – January 7, 2022

Search Party is an American dark comedy television series created by Sarah-Violet Bliss, Charles Rogers, and Michael Showalter. Primarily set in New York City, the series follows a group of friends who become involved in the search for a missing young woman and the events that result from their involvement.

The series premiered on TBS on November 21, 2016. Following the first two seasons, Search Party moved to HBO Max for the remainder of its run. It concluded on January 7, 2022, after five seasons.

== Plot ==
Search Party depicts the lives of Brooklyn resident Dory Sief, her passive boyfriend Drew Gardner, flamboyant show-off Elliott Goss, and flighty actress Portia Davenport. Serving as a contrast to the group is Dory's ex-boyfriend Julian Marcus, a journalist whose blunt nature frequently puts him into conflict with others.

The first season focuses on the disappearance of Dory's college acquaintance Chantal Witherbottom, whom Dory sets out to find, with Drew, Elliott, and Portia reluctantly joining her investigation. While her friends also deal with difficulties in their own lives, Dory obsessively focuses on her pursuit of Chantal, believing her to be in danger.

The second season focuses on the aftermath of the death of Keith Powell, a private investigator who is killed as a result of Dory mistakenly believing him to be a threat to Chantal. As the group struggles to return to their normal lives, they also attempt to cover up Keith's death, which affects them in various ways.

The third season focuses on Dory and Drew being tried for murdering Keith, which Dory denies any involvement in, forcing them to battle against the evidence proving they caused his death. A media circus soon circles around the trial, while the friends have their relationships tested, and Dory's sanity gradually deteriorates.

The fourth season focuses on Dory's abduction at the hands of Chip Wreck, an unstable man obsessed with her. The abduction sends Drew, Elliott, and Portia searching for Dory as Chip attempts to manipulate Dory against her friends.

The fifth season focuses on Dory becoming a cult leader after a near death experience causes her to feel a spiritual awakening while she rekindles her relationship with Drew and begins a romance with Portia, who quickly becomes a devotee and Elliott struggling to control his unsettlingly adopted son. Assisted by her friends, billionaire tech mogul Tunnel Quinn, and the top social media influencers, Dory attempts to create a pill that will replicate her experience, oblivious to the dangers of her endeavor.

== Cast ==
=== Main ===
- Alia Shawkat as Dory Sief
- John Reynolds as Andrew "Drew" Gardner
- John Early as Elliott Goss (né Eldad Tupper)
- Meredith Hagner as Portia Davenport

=== Recurring ===
- Clare McNulty as Chantal Witherbottom (27 episodes; seasons 1–5)
- Brandon Micheal Hall as Julian Marcus (seasons 1–2; guest seasons 3–4)
- Jeffery Self as Marc (23 episodes; seasons 1–5)
- Ron Livingston as Keith Powell (12 episodes; seasons 1–4)
- Phoebe Tyers as April (12 episodes; seasons 1–4)
- Christine Taylor as Gail (11 episodes; seasons 1–5)
- Cole Escola as Chip Wreck (10 episodes; seasons 3–4)
- Bonnie Milligan as Kathryn (9 episodes)
- Shalita Grant as Cassidy (7 episdoes)

== Episodes ==
Season	Episodes	Originally released		
Season	Episodes	First released	Last released	Network
1	10	November 17, 2016	November 25, 2016	TBS
2	10	November 19, 2017	December 17, 2017	TBS
3	10	June 25, 2020		HBO Max
4	10	January 14, 2021	January 28, 2021	HBO Max
5	10	January 7, 2022		HBO Max

=== Season 1 (2016) ===
No. overall	No. in season	Title	Directed by	Written by	Original release date	U.S. viewers (millions)
1	1	"The Mysterious Disappearance of the Girl No One Knew"	Sarah-Violet Bliss & Charles Rogers	Story by : Sarah-Violet Bliss & Charles Rogers and Michael Showalter; Teleplay by : Sarah-Violet Bliss & Charles Rogers	November 17, 2016 (online); November 21, 2016 (TBS)	0.47
While walking down the street, Dory notices a missing person poster for an old college acquaintance, Chantal. Dory, an aimless millennial struggling to find a purpose in life, becomes obsessed with finding Chantal, although her boyfriend Drew and friends Elliott and Portia do not share her ardor. Later, Dory sees Chantal in a Chinese restaurant and tries to approach her, but Chantal runs away, leaving behind her copy of Anna Karenina. Elsewhere, the search party looking for Chantal finds her blood-stained blouse in a forest.
2	2	"The Woman Who Knew Too Much"	Sarah-Violet Bliss & Charles Rogers	Charles Rogers	November 21, 2016	0.35
Dory tells her boyfriend and friends that she saw Chantal at the Chinese restaurant, but they do not believe her, as the discovery of Chantal's blouse led to the presumption that she was dead. Dory goes to the police station and tells a detective that she saw Chantal, but he too is unfazed. In the bathroom of the police station, Dory meets Lorraine, a real estate agent who claims she also saw Chantal. Dory, having finally found an ally, eagerly shares her knowledge of the disappearance with Lorraine. As she spends more time with her, however, Dory begins to suspect that Lorraine might be psychotic. Her suspicions are confirmed when Lorraine finds Dory at a party and has a violent and paranoid outburst. Later that night, Dory scrolls through Chantal's Facebook page and notices that the sign Chantal was carrying in her Ice Bucket Challenge video has the same star-and-rainbow doodle as an underlined passage in Chantal's copy of Anna Karenina. Dory is elated at this discovery. The episode ends with another glimpse of Chantal, this time riding a bus out of town.
3	3	"The Night of One Hundred Candles"	Sarah-Violet Bliss & Charles Rogers	Christina Lee	November 22, 2016	0.86
Dory, Drew, Elliot, and Portia attend a candlelight vigil for Chantal at her family's home. At the vigil, they see Agnes Cho, an old college acquaintance and Chantal's close friend. Agnes tells them that she hasn't seen Chantal in weeks and that Chantal and her boyfriend Gavin, who is also in attendance, had broken up a few months prior. Dory finds Chantal's mother alone and drunk in the kitchen and reveals that she saw Chantal at the Chinese restaurant. Mrs. Witherbottom, initially confused, begins crying and screaming, and Chantal's brother-in-law chastises Dory for her insensitivity. Dory sneaks into Chantal's room, and in a jewelry box finds a strip of photos of Chantal and her boyfriend — and a folded-up sonogram that suggests that Chantal is pregnant.
4	4	"The Captive Dinner Guest"	Sarah-Violet Bliss & Charles Rogers	Michael Showalter	November 22, 2016	0.52
Dory and Drew organize a double date with Portia and Chantal's eccentric ex-boyfriend Gavin, since he is the prime suspect in Chantal's disappearance. When Dory runs to the store to pick up some wine, she notices a man following her. After a tense dinner, Gavin goes to the bathroom and Dory takes his phone. She and Drew tell Portia to keep Gavin occupied while they sneak off with the phone. They find that his outbox filled with hundreds of emails to Chantal, which Dory forwards to Drew's phone. Drew's phone, still in the living room, begins to sound frantically, interrupting Gavin's attempts to seduce Portia. When Gavin realizes his phone is missing, he lashes out at them. Dory tells him that Chantal was pregnant, but Gavin tells them that Chantal was cheating on him. Later that night, as Dory takes out the garbage, she sees the same man who had been following her earlier.
5	5	"The Mystery of the Golden Charm"	Ryan McFaul	Anthony King	November 23, 2016	0.89
Through the forwarded emails, Dory finds out that Chantal had a contentious relationship with her roommate, Penelope. Later, while at a convenience store, Dory spots the man who had been following her. She confronts him and discovers that he is a private investigator named Keith Powell who was hired by Chantal's family. Relieved, they decide to work together. The two go to Chantal's apartment and meet Penelope, who shows them a box of Chantal's belongings, but won't let them take it. Keith manages to pocket a small box that Penelope said was from Chantal's new boyfriend. Inside the box is a wolf's tooth on a chain from a store called Bellow & Hare. Dory goes to Bellow & Hare and meets the owner, Brick, who invites her to a gathering of artists. When Dory mentions Bellow & Hare to her friends, Elliott tells them that the place is a cult. The episode closes on a shot of Chantal, alone in a bare room, singing to herself. She hears a noise and is startled.
6	6	"The Secret of the Sinister Ceremony"	Ryan McFaul	Sarah-Violet Bliss	November 23, 2016	0.51
Dory, becoming increasingly enthralled with the case, sets up a "crime wall" with photos of her suspects in Chantal's disappearance, despite Drew's protestations over her safety. Dory, Portia, and Elliott attend the artists' gathering at Bellow & Hare, where there are a unusually high number of pregnant women. Elliott runs into an old friend, who is pregnant, uncharacteristically positive, and repeatedly mentions "The Moment." A clairvoyant at the party pulls Dory aside and tells her that he's had repeated visions of her in a room with her friends staring at her and gasping. The group sits to eat and everyone is encouraged to share stories of "acute intimacy" with the group. Dory reveals that she is looking for Chantal, but is soon interrupted by a baby monitor. "The Moment" has arrived, and everyone heads into another room except for Dory and her friends, who are barred from entering. Dory sneaks inside and is shocked to find the cult members standing in a circle and watching a woman give birth on the floor. Later that night, Dory and Drew go back to their apartment to find the door unlocked and Dory's "crime wall" torn down. A piece of white paper says: STOP LOOKING FOR CHANTAL. Dory is convinced that it was the cult's doing.
7	7	"The Riddle Within the Trash"	Ryan McFaul	Christina Lee	November 24, 2016	0.15
Dory and Keith break into the cult's property to steal their garbage. They find a check from Lorraine's real estate company in the trash. Drew spends time with their upstairs neighbor April, who attempts to seduce him, but he turns her down. Dory and Keith, however, grow closer and end up having sex. Afterward, Keith gets into a heated argument on the phone and tells Dory about his failed marriage and his daughter. He confesses to Dory that he's falling in love with her, which disturbs her as she has no romantic feelings for him. While Keith showers, Dory sneaks out of his apartment. Back home, Drew confesses to Dory that April attempted to seduce him, but asserts that nothing happened. Dory bursts into tears, but doesn't confess to her affair. Meanwhile, Dory's ex-boyfriend Julian interviews Elliott for an article and grows suspicious about Elliott's life story (in particular his tale that he had Stage IV cancer). Julian confronts Elliott about his cancer story, and Elliott leaves in a rush, fearing that his secret is about to be revealed.
8	8	"The Return of the Forgotten Phantom"	Sarah-Violet Bliss & Charles Rogers	Anthony King	November 24, 2016	0.11
Dory, turned off of Chantal's case after her one-night stand with Keith, wakes up to several missed calls from him. Meanwhile, Julian exposes Elliott's fabricated cancer story in his article. Dory supports Elliott, saying that "good people do bad things sometimes" and confesses to him that she cheated on Drew with Keith. Portia, however, has a hard time forgiving Elliott. Marc, Elliott's on-and-off boyfriend, forgives him once Elliott tells him that he is willing to work on his pathological lying. However, when Elliot is offered a book deal, he rushes off. At a coffee shop, Dory is offered a job by woman she had previously interviewed with. She quits her current job working as an assistant for her wealthy boss, Gail. However, instead of accepting the job offer, she goes to Lorraine's real estate agency to ask about the check she found in the cult's trash. The realtors burst into laughter at the mention of Lorraine, who had only been a temp at the agency and created a fake business card to pretend she was a head realtor. It is then revealed that Lorraine was hit by a train in undetermined circumstances. Dory goes to Keith's apartment to tell him that Lorraine is dead, and he urges her to keep working on the case with him, having found new leads.
9	9	"Password to the Shadows"	Sarah-Violet Bliss & Charles Rogers	Sarah-Violet Bliss	November 25, 2016	0.63
When Dory fails to return home the next morning, a paranoid Drew calls Julian, with whom he suspects Dory might be cheating on him. Dory, meanwhile, wakes up in Keith's apartment, having fallen asleep watching surveillance tapes with him. Before she can rush home, she sees Agnes Cho, whom she met at the candlelight vigil, on the surveillance footage outside the Chinese restaurant. Drew confronts Dory at their apartment, and she lies and tells him that she spent the night at the Museum of Natural History with Elliott. Dory and Drew go to the zoo where Agnes works to ask her about Chantal, but Agnes won't talk unless she's given $5,000 for her apes. Dory and Elliott track Chantal's family down to a bridal salon to ask for the money, only to learn that they never hired a private investigator and don't know who Keith is. Dory is shaken, convinced that Keith is part of the cult. Meanwhile, Drew and Portia successfully blackmail Chuck — a man they met at the vigil — into giving them the money, and Agnes finally reveals that Chantal is in Montreal. Dory goes to Keith's apartment and falsely tells him that Agnes revealed that Chantal is in Miami. She urges him to call the Witherbottoms, whom she knows he was never in contact with, but he refuses, instead buying plane tickets for the two of them to fly to Miami the next morning. He makes further romantic advances toward her, but she leaves, claiming she has to pack and break up with Drew. Dory joins the group in the car, and they leave for Montreal.
10	10	"The House of Uncanny Truths"	Sarah-Violet Bliss & Charles Rogers	Charles Rogers	November 25, 2016	0.36
On the drive to Montreal, Dory has a nightmare about finding Chantal and being killed by Keith. Drew asks Elliott about the night at the museum and finds out that Dory lied about her whereabouts after spending the night at Keith's. Drew and Dory get into a heated argument and Drew orders a bus ticket to return home. Dory, Portia, and Elliott try to piece together the events surrounding Chantal's disappearance. They believe that Keith is part of the cult and that Chantal was an innocent woman that the group targeted for Keith to impregnante. They then believe that Keith killed Lorraine to hide the truth and is now going after Chantal. The group finally arrives at the mansion where Chantal is supposed to be and split up to find her. They find an empty bedroom with strewn-out belongings, but no Chantal. Portia leaves to go on a date with Matthieu — a French Canadian she briefly met — and Elliott excuses himself outside to speak to his publisher. Dory, alone in the mansion, hears a car door unlock and rushes out to see Keith breaking into front door. He angrily confronts Dory about lying to him about Chantal being in Miami. Dory, frightened, wields a Taser and tells him that she knows he was never hired by the family. Keith tries to grab her hand, and Dory stuns him with the Taser. He falls, hitting his head against the kitchen counter. When he comes to, he pins Dory to the ground, yelling at her while she screams for help. Drew quietly arrives and knocks Keith out with an obelisk-shaped trophy, killing him instantly. When Elliott finds the scene in the kitchen, he stops Dory and Drew from calling the police, not believing that Keith was killed in self-defense. Meanwhile, unaware of what just happened, Portia gleefully arrives from a bar with Matthieu and Chantal, having found the latter at a local bar. Dory, Drew, and Elliott hide Keith's body in a closet and the obelisk in the fridge. Dory is shocked to see Chantal, who explains why she vanished: she had an affair with a married man who refused to leave his family for her, and then decided to "ghost everyone." Dory, realizing that Chantal was never in any real danger, goes into a bathroom to vomit.

=== Season 2 (2017) ===
No. overall	No. in season	Title	Directed by	Written by	Original release date	U.S. viewers (millions)
11	1	"Murder!"	Sarah-Violet Bliss & Charles Rogers	Sarah-Violet Bliss & Charles Rogers	November 19, 2017	0.79
After finding the not-so-missing Chantal and killing the not-so-villainous Keith, the gang is faced with the horrifying task of trying to bury a body before the sun comes up.
12	2	"Conspiracy"	Sarah-Violet Bliss & Charles Rogers	Sarah-Violet Bliss & Charles Rogers	November 19, 2017	0.52
The gang goes on a mission to cover up Keith's semi-accidental murder and return Chantal to her family, with just a few major roadblocks along the way.
13	3	"Paralysis"	Sarah-Violet Bliss & Charles Rogers	Jordan Firstman and Starlee Kine	November 26, 2017	0.62
The friends attempt to readjust to life after murder and it proves to be harder than they expected.
14	4	"Suspicion"	Lilly Burns	Anthony King	November 26, 2017	0.39
Darkness descends on the friends as they make choices out of fear. Dory is confronted by Keith's ex-wife. Portia will do anything to be cast in a play about the Manson Murder. Meanwhile, Drew attempts to escape to Shanghai.
15	5	"Paranoia"	Michael Showalter	Christina Lee	December 3, 2017	0.70
The gang is invited to Chappaqua where they receive the key to the city for finding Chantal, while a police woman named Joy begins to uncover their tracks.
16	6	"Obsession"	Michael Showalter	Andrew Fleming and Matt Kriete	December 3, 2017	0.44
As Elliott descends into insanity, the gang turns their backs on Dory, who begins working with Julian at a political campaign.
17	7	"Denial"	Michael Showalter	Sarah-Violet Bliss	December 10, 2017	0.61
Dory drops in on Keith's funeral, Drew investigates flowers left at his work, Portia severs ties with her mother, Elliott endures group therapy at rehab, and Julian realizes Mary may be an imperfect role model.
18	8	"Hysteria"	Sarah-Violet Bliss & Charles Rogers	Charles Rogers	December 10, 2017	0.37
Dory and Drew receive a visit from hot-on-the-trail Officer Joy Hartman, make a shocking discovery at who knows what they did, meet up with a renewed Elliott, and still make it to Portia's play on time.
19	9	"Frenzy"	Sarah-Violet Bliss & Charles Rogers	Sarah-Violet Bliss & Charles Rogers	December 17, 2017	0.67
The gang must get sixty thousand dollars to their blackmailer, leading to a day of cat food tins, mistaken identities, and tasers. On the other side of town, Joy follows Fat Franky, which does not end as anticipated.
20	10	"Psychosis"	Sarah-Violet Bliss & Charles Rogers	Sarah-Violet Bliss & Charles Rogers	December 17, 2017	0.43
The gang ties up loose ends in their lives before facing the sobering reality that they might all go to jail by midnight, leaving it up to Dory to figure something out.

=== Season 3 (2020) ===
No. overall	No. in season	Title	Directed by	Written by	Original release date
21	1	"The Accused Woman"	Sarah-Violet Bliss & Charles Rogers	Sarah-Violet Bliss & Charles Rogers	June 25, 2020
Dory's arrested and the friends are spiraling. What do they do now? Are the cops coming for them next? And more importantly, which one of them told the authorities?
22	2	"The Rookie Lawyer"	Sarah-Violet Bliss & Charles Rogers	Craig Rowin	June 25, 2020
Pandemonium breaks loose when an anonymous tip is leaked to the press. Dory and Drew lawyer up, while Elliott and Portia head for the hills. Or, rather, the sand dunes of East Hampton.
23	3	"The Whistleblower"	Jay Duplass	Andrew Pierce Fleming & Matt Kriete	June 25, 2020
Given the mountains of evidence against them, Dory, Drew, and their uninspiring legal team struggle to come up with a half-decent defense strategy, while Portia and Elliott are aggressively interrogated under fluorescent lighting.
24	4	"A National Affair"	Jay Duplass	Starlee Kine	June 25, 2020
The media can't get enough of this salacious case, and Dory is starting to enjoy the attention. Meanwhile, Drew addresses the skeletons in his closet, and a betrayed Elliott cuts ties with Portia, driving her into the open arms of Christ.
25	5	"Public Appeal"	Sarah-Violet Bliss & Charles Rogers	Sarah-Violet Bliss & Charles Rogers	June 25, 2020
Dory enlists her family to join her for a melodramatic TV interview, where they give the performance of a lifetime. Portia bonds with her new Christian friends, while Elliott and Marc's wedding plans become more and more extravagant.
26	6	"In God We Trust"	Sarah-Violet Bliss & Charles Rogers	Jordan Firstman	June 25, 2020
While Dory and Drew face their grueling first day in court, which begins with damning testimony from Portia, Elliott plays with fire by appearing on a conservative talk show.
27	7	"Rogue Witness"	Sarah-Violet Bliss & Charles Rogers	Craig Rowin	June 25, 2020
Elliott takes the stand to testify for the defense. Portia's faith deepens, as does her bond with her new Christian friends. Drew makes a dangerously self-sabotaging choice, and Dory receives a terrifying message.
28	8	"A Dangerous Union"	Carrie Brownstein	Sabrina Jalees	June 25, 2020
As the gang tries their best to put aside their differences at Elliott and Marc's epic wedding, Dory can't help but feel wary that a threatening presence looms nearby.
29	9	"Irrefutable Evidence"	Sarah-Violet Bliss & Charles Rogers	Sarah-Violet Bliss & Charles Rogers	June 25, 2020
Alarming evidence surfaces that potentially obliterates Dory and Drew's chances of being acquitted. Elliott confronts his roots, and Portia attempts to make amends for testifying against her friends.
30	10	"The Reckoning"	Sarah-Violet Bliss & Charles Rogers	Sarah-Violet Bliss & Charles Rogers	June 25, 2020
It's the tensest day of the gang's lives as the jury deliberates over Dory and Drew's fate.

=== Season 4 (2021) ===
No. overall	No. in season	Title	Directed by	Written by	Original release date
31	1	"The Girl in the Basement"	Sarah-Violet Bliss & Charles Rogers	Sarah-Violet Bliss & Charles Rogers	January 14, 2021
Dory wakes up to a terrifying new reality, while Portia, Elliott, and Drew grow impatient with their seemingly AWOL "friend."
32	2	"Something Sharp"	Sarah-Violet Bliss & Charles Rogers	Christina Lee	January 14, 2021
Dory tries to break out of her felt prison, Drew starts a new life at a theme park, Portia auditions for the film adaption of the trial, and Elliott reconsiders his political beliefs for a chance to host his own talk show.
33	3	"Escape to Nowhere"	Sarah-Violet Bliss & Charles Rogers	Emily Heller	January 14, 2021
Drew's deep, dark, secret is discovered by his new-found love, Portia works on her movie, Elliot works with Charlie in his new political party, and Dory and Chip celebrate three months of friendship.
34	4	"Home Again, Home Again, Jiggity-Jig"	Sarah-Violet Bliss & Charles Rogers	Jordan Firstman	January 21, 2021
Chip drags Dory back to the house, where a nosy Paula Jo awaits. Drew rushes back to New York after seeing something strange on social, Portia has a bleak first day on set, and Elliott gains even more notoriety.
35	5	"Doctor Mindbender"	John Lee	Matt Kriete & Andrew Pierce Fleming	January 21, 2021
Chip feeds Dory his own version of the events that brought them together, while the gang takes a closer look into Dory's absence.
36	6	"The Thoughtless Woman"	John Lee	Starlee Kine	January 21, 2021
Dory's finally at peace in her new home - but she doesn't quite feel like herself anymore. The gang's search takes them to the Lil Sticky's factory, where owners Richard and Gertrude give them the red-carpet treatment.
37	7	"The Infinite Loop"	Sarah-Violet Bliss & Charles Rogers	Matt Kriete & Andrew Pierce Fleming	January 28, 2021
The real Lylah appears, and the gang finally gets a solid lead on Dory's whereabouts.
38	8	"The Imposter"	Alia Shawkat	Starlee Kine	January 28, 2021
After bringing her family to financial ruin, Chantal is inspired to tell her life story. Dory sees something on TV that reminds her who she is.
39	9	"The Inferno"	Sarah-Violet Bliss & Charles Rogers	Sarah-Violet Bliss & Charles Rogers	January 28, 2021
Dory struggles with reality after being brainwashed. Drew gets a surprise. Lylah puts the final touch on her cover-up.
40	10	"The Shadows"	Sarah-Violet Bliss & Charles Rogers	Sarah-Violet Bliss & Charles Rogers	January 28, 2021
Drew, Elliott, and Portia must come to terms with their loss.

=== Season 5 (2022) ===
No. overall	No. in season	Title	Directed by	Written by	Original release date
41	1	"Genesis"	John Lee	Sarah-Violet Bliss & Charles Rogers	January 7, 2022
As Dory embarks on an enlightened new path in the wake of her near-death experience, Portia, Elliott, and Drew notice a disconcerting change in Dory, leading the gang to contemplate how to move forward in life, work, and love.
42	2	"Exodus"	John Lee	Sarah-Violet Bliss & Charles Rogers	January 7, 2022
As she amasses a substantial new following for her controversial spiritual guidance, Dory spreads the word about her enlightenment while attempting to make amends with her friends for what happened, resulting in a day full of suspicions, confessions, and possibilities.
43	3	"Kings"	John Lee	Starlee Kine	January 7, 2022
Dory invites the gang to a meeting of the minds with tech billionaire Tunnel Quinn, giving them a chance to talk to someone with power. Meanwhile, Elliott and Marc start to harbor serious suspicions about their unsettlingly adopted son, Aspen.
44	4	"Leviticus"	Heather Jack	Andrew Pierce Fleming & Matt Kriete	January 7, 2022
As the Tunnel Industry scientists work on the technology behind their highly anticipated enlightenment pill, Dory and her gang kick off a nationwide search for their first recipients: six influencers eager to be Dory's disciples.
45	5	"Acts of the Apostles"	Heather Jack	Craig Rowin	January 7, 2022
Dory makes a shocking discovery about the status of the Lyte pill with help from Elliott's sleuthing. At the same time, her disciples take drastic measures that call her beliefs and everything she knows into question, proving their loyalty to the cause.
46	6	"The Gospel of Judas"	John Lee	Andrew Pierce Fleming & Matt Kriete	January 7, 2022
As she oversees a pupil's research, Dory becomes increasingly unwell – and begins to suspect that she's being poisoned from within, while Drew casts doubt upon some of her teachings to answers about Dory's time at the mental hospital.
47	7	"Book of the Wars of the Lord"	John Lee	Sarah-Violet Bliss & Charles Rogers	January 7, 2022
The FBI descends upon Lyte Headquarters as Dory orchestrates a precarious hostage situation. While her fellow disciples race against time to finish the pill's formula, Portia attempts to get back in Dory's good graces.
48	8	"Song of Songs"	Sarah-Violet Bliss & Charles Rogers	Starlee Kine	January 7, 2022
After pulling off a grand illusion, Dory's enlightenment brigade prepares to take the pills. Meanwhile, in the wake of a jaw-dropping revelation, Chantal takes steps to fend off the end of the world.
49	9	"Lamentations"	Sarah-Violet Bliss & Charles Rogers	Craig Rowin	January 7, 2022
When one of Dory's followers has an alarming reaction after discovering the pills' grisly side effects, the rest of the squad scrambles to save themselves – and humanity as they know it – before it's too late.
50	10	"Revelation"	Sarah-Violet Bliss & Charles Rogers	Sarah-Violet Bliss & Charles Rogers	January 7, 2022
With New York City under siege, the gang finds themselves crossing paths with an unlikely savior in their desperate fight for survival as they hope that everyone can be saved.

== Background and production ==
=== Conception and development ===
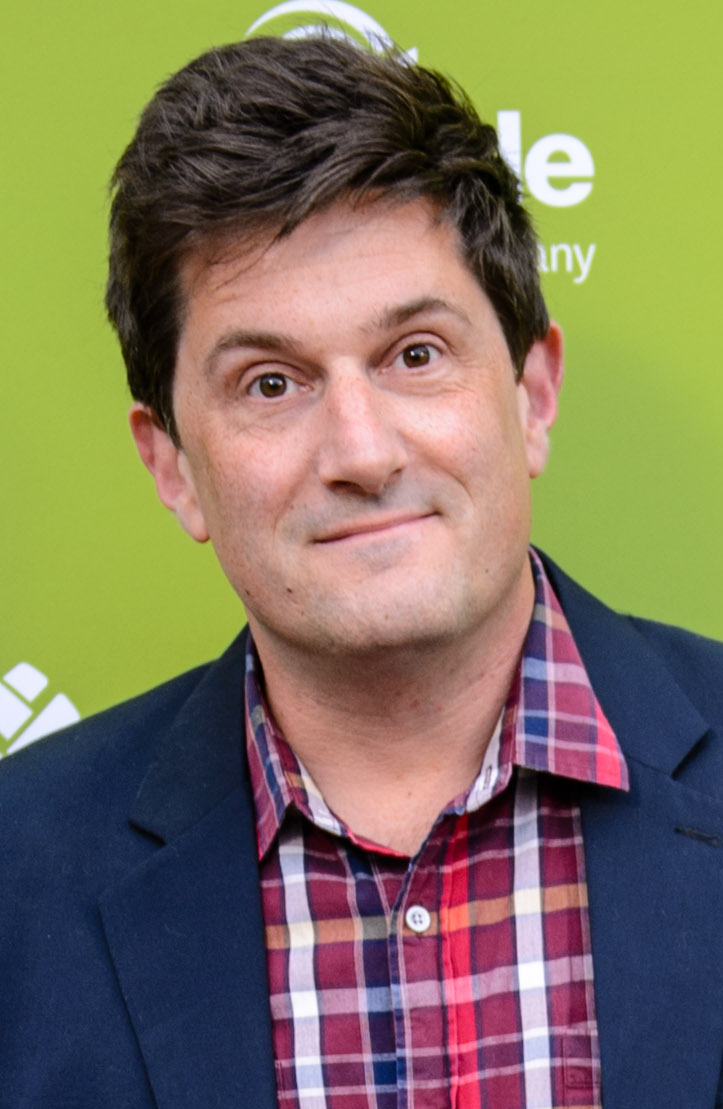
Michael Showalter, who co-created the show with Sarah-Violet Bliss and Charles Rogers, pictured at the Montclair Film Festival, May 2015

Sarah-Violet Bliss and Charles Rogers became friends while at New York University's Graduate Film School, where in their third year they made feature film Fort Tilden (2014), a hard-to-watch comedy about unsympathetic millennials that was well-received by critics, winning the grand jury award at the 2014 South by Southwest film festival. Alt-comedy mainstay Michael Showalter was an adjunct professor at the school at the time and after being impressed by the pair's work on the film and their writing for Netflix show Wet Hot American Summer: First Day of Camp, joined them in trying to develop a satirical show about "aimless youth" that grew out of Fort Tilden.

Bliss and Rogers considered different narrative hooks for the show, until Showalter and production company Jax Media proposed structuring it as a murder mystery. At the time, true crime podcasts such as Serial, often starring what Showalter called "Brooklyn intellectuals" exploring dangerous environments, were surging in popularity. Production company Jax Media were confident in the project but concerned that the writers' unique voice and the project's genre ambiguity could make it hard to sell to networks, so decided to take on the risk of financing the pilot themselves.

=== Casting and production ===
In June 2015, it was announced Alia Shawkat, John Early, John Reynolds, and Meredith Hagner had all been cast in the pilot, with Showalter, Lilly Burns, and Tony Hernandez serving as executive producers and John Skidmore, Brittany Segal as producers.

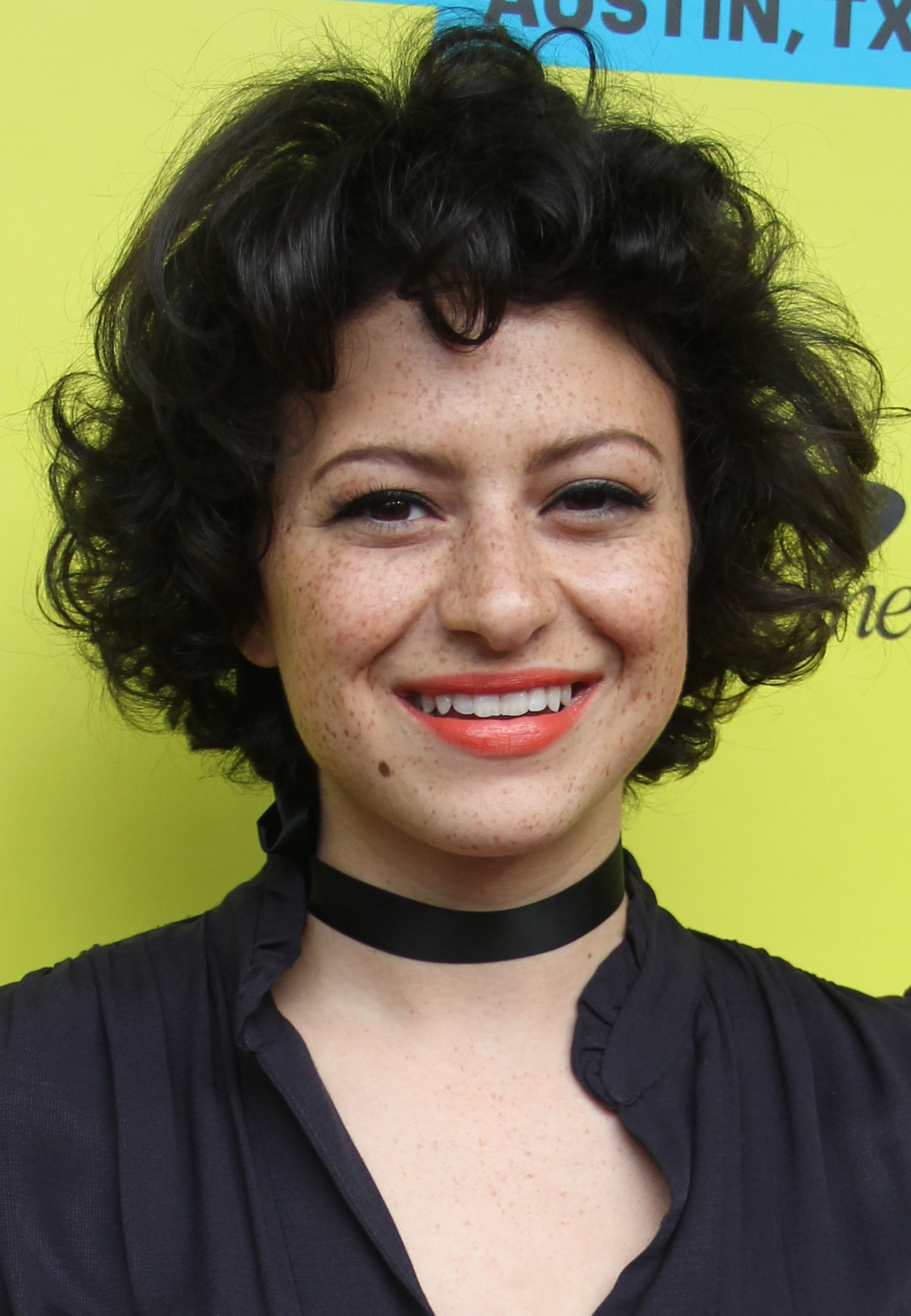
Alia Shawkat, who played the lead role of Dory Sief, pictured at South by Southwest 2016.

In November 2015, TBS ordered the series and in December 2016, the series was renewed for a second season, which premiered on November 19, 2017. In April 2018, a third season was ordered, however in October 2019 it was announced the series would move to HBO Max, where the third season would premiere at the service's Spring 2020 launch. A fourth season was also ordered, which premiered in 2021. On February 9, 2021, HBO Max renewed the series for a fifth season. On November 9, 2021, the fifth season was given a premiere date of January 7, 2022, revealed to be its last.

=== Filming ===
Of the filming of the pilot, Shawkat later commented "We shot it like an indie movie, stealing shots on subways and wearing some of our own clothes. I was like, this is good but it’s never going to get made." The shooting of the first season began in the summer of 2015 in Brooklyn, New York, including locations in Greenpoint, Williamsburg, Gowanus, Windsor Terrace, and Park Slope. For the filming of the second season the production returned to New York. Filming for season 3 began in September 2018 and wrapped that November. Production on Season 4 began in December 2019 and wrapped in late February 2020.

== Themes ==
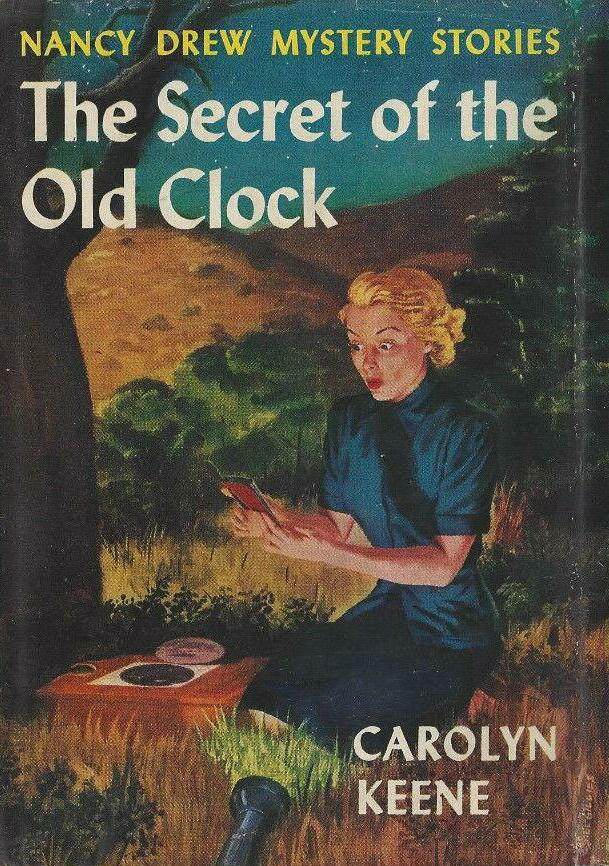
Cover of a 1953 print of The Secret of the Old Clock, a book from the Nancy Drew Mystery Stories, which the show's initial plot drew inspiration from

While the show is a dark comedy, Search Party undergoes shifts of tone and genre in each season. The first season is a mystery, revolving around the disappearance of Chantal Witherbottom and the story nods to classic detective stories such as Nancy Drew Mystery Stories, as underlined by the promotional art designed by Sam Hadley. It also includes comedy-drama elements, since the mystery plot is echoed by Dory's search for meaning and purpose. The creator Charles Rogers stated that the show explores "what it means to be "a good person"" and "the difference between wanting to be seen as a good person and being an actual one". The first three seasons also have a running theme around the toxic nature of deception, both deceiving others and self-deception. Télérama labeled the first season as an existential quest. According to Rogers, the title highlights this multiplicity:

We wanted a title that conveys this blend of comedy and drama, but all our propositions were incongruous or far-fetched. Until we figured out that the most simple phrase used to talk about organized searches when a person's missing, "search party", was perfect : "search" represents mystery and "party" is the fun part. The heroes of the show don't really know what they're doing. For them, it's a light and entertaining thing. They shouldn't get involved in such detective work...

The second season features psychological thriller elements, as underlined by the Alfred Hitchcock-inspired promotional art. Alia Shawkat asserted that the main theme of the season is "Hitchcock's paranoia".

Dory and Drew's trial in the third series introduces a "courtroom drama" narrative, influenced by the works of John Grisham. The legal plot was inspired by the real-life trial of Amanda Knox, who was convicted of murder in 2007. Moreover, the satire is mostly focused on fame and the media, with Rogers referencing the satirical crime film The Bling Ring and the cult dark comedy film To Die For, whose postmodern style is echoed throughout the season thanks to the inclusion of fictional true-crime shows and interviews of the main characters. The fourth season was described by Sarah-Violet Bliss as "being the kind of 'captive' genre" and drew comparisons to Misery. Critics described the fifth season as surreal science fiction and zombie horror.

Shawkat characterised her character's arc as showing "how desperate and how far you’ll go — all the different versions of yourself you will try to find out which one sticks."

== Reception ==
Critical response of Search Party
Season	Rotten Tomatoes	Metacritic
1	100% (38 reviews)	81 (19 reviews)
2	96% (27 reviews)	78 (9 reviews)
3	93% (28 reviews)	78 (10 reviews)
4	95% (22 reviews)	68 (5 reviews)
5	100% (13 reviews)	82 (4 reviews)

The first season received positive reviews from television critics. Los Angeles Times wrote that it was "tightly made and effective on multiple levels". GQ wrote that it is "a flawless oddity, a once-in-a-lifetime piece of art. It's not the weekend's best show, it's the year's best." It holds a 100% approval rating on Rotten Tomatoes. The site's critical consensus reads, "Search Party is an engaging, weird, dark, funny mystery elevated by exceptional performances throughout." On Metacritic, the season holds a rating of 81 out of 100, indicating "universal acclaim". The show earned a nomination for the 2017 Gotham Independent Film Award for Breakthrough Series – Long Form.

The second season of Search Party received positive reviews from television critics. It holds a 96% approval rating on Rotten Tomatoes. The site's critical consensus reads, "With a never-better Alia Shawkat in the lead, Search Party's second season delves deeper into the deliciously dark dramedy that makes the show so addictively entertaining." On Metacritic, the season holds a rating of 78 out of 100, indicating "generally favorable reviews".

The third season of Search Party received positive reviews from television critics. It holds a 93% approval rating on Rotten Tomatoes. The site's critical consensus reads, "Search Party's third season changes the satirical scenery without losing any of its bite, while giving its capable cast plenty of moments to shine." On Metacritic, the season holds a rating of 78 out of 100, indicating "generally favorable reviews".

Following the final season, The New York Times critic Dave Itzkoff summarised that the show "evolved from a low-fi if knowing satire of youthful narcissism into an unexpectedly intricate and baroque series, free to follow its muse down some very dark corridors." Mashable's Proma Khosla hailed it as "one of the most impeccable, twisted, and incisive comedies in years." Critics praised the show for its depiction of millennial adulthood in the increasingly fractious society of late 2010s America. Time critic Judy Berman remarked, "In its journey from realism to absurdity, Search Party captured something that an Obama-era show like Girls—which, like its predecessor Sex and the City, quickly aged into triviality—never could." Chris Vanjonack of Electric Literature wrote, "Be it climate collapse, an AI apocalypse, an even more virulent variant, or, god forbid, nuclear war, the show’s writers dare us to imagine what we might look like inside of those moments of crisis, forcing us to consider that even in the face of certain death, we’ll be stuck with all the worst parts of ourselves."

=== Awards and recognition ===
Year	Award	Category	Recipient	Result
2016	SXSW Film Festival	SXSW Gamechanger Award	Bliss, Rogers, Showalter, Hernandez, Burns	Nominated
2017	Gotham Independent Film Award	Breakthrough Series - Longform	Sarah-Violet Bliss	Nominated
2017	Gracie Award	Actress in a Breakthrough Role	Alia Shawkat	Won
2021	The Webby Awards	Social - Television & Film	Search Party	Nominated
2021	Gold Derby Awards	Comedy Guest Actress	Susan Sarandon	Nominated
2021	The Queerties	TV Performance	John Early	Nominated
2021	Dorian TV Awards	Best Unsung TV Show	Search Party	Nominated
2022	The Queerties	TV Performance	Cole Escola	Nominated
