= Gotham Independent Film Award for Breakthrough Series – Long Form =

Former annual US film award

- Country: United States
- Presented by: The Gotham Film & Media Institute
- First award: 2015
- Currently held by: A Small Light (2023)
- Website: awards.thegotham.org

The Gotham Independent Film Award for Breakthrough Series – Long Form is one of the annual Gotham Independent Film Awards and honors series with episodes over 40 minutes. Until 2019, the award honored a new "continuing or limited series with episodes running 30 minutes or longer". It was first awarded in 2015.

== Winners and nominees ==
=== 2010s ===
Year	Program	Creator(s)	Network	Ref.
2015	Mr. Robot	Sam Esmail	USA Network	
2015	Jane the Virgin	Jennie Snyder Urman	The CW	
2015	Transparent	Joey Soloway	Amazon	
2015	Unbreakable Kimmy Schmidt	Tina Fey and Robert Carlock	Netflix	
2015	Unreal	Marti Noxon and Sarah Gertrude Shapiro	Lifetime	
2016	Crazy Ex-Girlfriend	Rachel Bloom and Aline Brosh McKenna	The CW	
2016	The Girlfriend Experience	Lodge Kerrigan and Amy Seimetz	Starz	
2016	Horace and Pete	Louis C.K.	louisck.net	
2016	Marvel's Jessica Jones	Melissa Rosenberg	Netflix	
2016	Master of None	Aziz Ansari and Alan Yang	Netflix	
2017	Atlanta	Donald Glover	FX	
2017	Better Things	Pamela Adlon and Louis C.K.	FX	
2017	Dear White People	Justin Simien	Netflix	
2017	Fleabag	Phoebe Waller-Bridge	Amazon	
2017	Search Party	Sarah-Violet Bliss, Charles Rogers, and Michael Showalter	TBS	
2018	Killing Eve	–	BBC America	
2018	Alias Grace	–	Netflix	
2018	Big Mouth	Nick Kroll, Andrew Goldberg, Mark Levin, and Jennifer Flackett	Netflix	
2018	The End of the F***ing World	–	Netflix	
2018	Pose	Ryan Murphy, Brad Falchuk, and Steven Canals	FX	
2018	Sharp Objects	Marti Noxon	HBO	
2019	When They See Us	Ava DuVernay	Netflix	
2019	Chernobyl	Craig Mazin	HBO	
2019	David Makes Man	Tarell Alvin McCraney	OWN	
2019	My Brilliant Friend	Saverio Costanzo	HBO	
2019	Unbelievable	Susannah Grant, Ayelet Waldman, and Michael Chabon	Netflix	

=== 2020s ===
Year	Program	Creator(s)	Network	Ref.
2020	Watchmen	Damon Lindelof	HBO	
2020	The Great	Tony McNamara	Hulu	
2020	Immigration Nation	–	Netflix	
2020	P-Valley	Katori Hall	Starz	
2020	Unorthodox	Anna Winger and Alexa Karolinski	Netflix	
2021	Squid Game	Hwang Dong-hyuk	Netflix	
2021	The Good Lord Bird	Ethan Hawke and Mark Richard	Showtime	
2021	It's a Sin	Russell T Davies	HBO Max	
2021	Small Axe	Steve McQueen	Amazon	
2021	The Underground Railroad	Barry Jenkins and Colson Whitehead	Amazon	
2021	The White Lotus	Mike White	HBO	
2022	Pachinko	Soo Hugh	Apple TV+	
2022	Severance	Dan Erickson	Apple TV+	
2022	Station Eleven	Patrick Somerville	HBO/HBO Max	
2022	This Is Going to Hurt	Adam Kay	AMC+	
2022	Yellowjackets	Ashley Lyle and Bart Nickerson	Showtime	
2023	A Small Light	Tony Phelan and Joan Rater	NatGeo	
2023	Anne Rice's Interview with the Vampire	Rolin Jones	AMC	
2023	Dead Ringers	Alice Birch	Amazon	
2023	The English	Hugo Blick	Amazon	
2023	The Last of Us	Craig Mazin and Neil Druckmann	HBO	
2023	Telemarketers	–	HBO	
