= Dummy (TV series) =

2020 American streaming television series

- Genre: Comedy
- Created by: Cody Heller
- Written by: Cody Heller
- Directed by: Tricia Brock
- Starring: Anna Kendrick; Meredith Hagner; Donal Logue
- Composer: Mandy Hoffman
- No. of seasons: 1
- No. of episodes: 10

Production
- Executive producers: Tricia Brock; Cody Heller; Anna Kendrick; Paul Lee; Josh Stern
- Producer: Dylan Golden
- Cinematography: Catherine Goldschmidt
- Editor: Lee Haugen
- Production companies: wiip; Heller Highwater Pictures; Let's Go Again, Inc.

Original release
- Network: Quibi
- Release: April 20 – April 29, 2020

Dummy is an American comedy television series created by Cody Heller that debuted on Quibi on April 20, 2020. The series is based on a real life experience between Heller and her partner Dan Harmon, in which she discovered that he had a sex doll. The series was originally developed as a television pilot, but the script was rewritten as a film and then split into less than 10-minute episodes to fit into the concept of Quibi.

== Cast ==
- Anna Kendrick as Cody Heller
- Meredith Hagner as Barbara Himmelbaum-Harmon
- Donal Logue as Dan Harmon

== Episodes ==
No.	Title	Directed by	Written by	Original release date
1	"Expired Melatonin"	Tricia Brock	Cody Heller	April 20, 2020
2	"Ideal Woman"	Tricia Brock	Cody Heller	April 20, 2020
3	"Doll Parts"	Tricia Brock	Cody Heller	April 20, 2020
4	"Terrible Writer/Useless Sex Doll"	Tricia Brock	Cody Heller	April 21, 2020
5	"Passive Protagonist"	Tricia Brock	Cody Heller	April 22, 2020
6	"Subtextual Feminism"	Tricia Brock	Cody Heller	April 23, 2020
7	"The Bechdel Test"	Tricia Brock	Cody Heller	April 24, 2020
8	"Woman With Agency"	Tricia Brock	Cody Heller	April 27, 2020
9	"Paraben-Free Lube"	Tricia Brock	Cody Heller	April 28, 2020
10	"Plus Size Plus One"	Tricia Brock	Cody Heller	April 29, 2020

== Accolades ==
Year	Award	Category	Nominee(s)	Result	Ref.
2020	Primetime Emmy Awards	Outstanding Actress in a Short Form Comedy or Drama Series	Anna Kendrick	Nominated	
