= John Early: Now More Than Ever =

- Directed by: Leah Hennessey; Emily Allan
- Written by: John Early
- Produced by: Amanda Schulz
- Starring: John Early; Dominique toney; Michael Hesslein; Princess Fortier; Yazan Fahmawi; Will Lawrence
- Cinematography: Jarred Alterman
- Edited by: Stephen Gurewitz
- Production company: Abso Lutely Productions
- Distributed by: HBO Max
- Release dates: June 15, 2023 (Tribeca Festival); June 17, 2023 (United States)
- Running time: 64 minutes
- Language: English

John Early: Now More Than Ever is a 2023 American musical stand-up comedy special written by and starring comedian John Early. The special, directed by Emily Allan and Leah Hennessey, was released on HBO Max on July 17, 2023, following a premiere at the 2023 Tribeca Festival.

The film received positive reviews from critics, later garnering a nomination for Outstanding Writing for a Variety Special at the 76th Primetime Emmy Awards.

== Production ==
The special was filmed at Roulette Intermedium in Brooklyn, New York City.

To capture the high energy nature of Early's routine, inspiration was taken from rock documentaries like The Last Waltz and Stop Making Sense. Backstage segments that are intercut throughout the special were inspired by This Is Spinal Tap.

== Critical reception ==
Now More Than Ever received generally positive reviews from critics. On Rotten Tomatoes, the film has a rating of 100%, based on 9 reviews, and an average rating of 8.2/10.

== Album ==
An accompanying album was later released via Thirty Tigers on September 13, 2024. The album features six new tracks, including "Vicky with a V", a character previously featured in Early's 2019 episode of The Characters.

Now More Than Ever

Studio album by John Early
- Released: September 13, 2024
- Length: 90:02
- Label: Thirty Tigers

=== Track listing ===
No.	Title	Length
1.	"Oops (Oh My)" (Tweet cover)	4:10
2.	"Parents"	1:30
3.	"Access Hollywood"	1:52
4.	"Not Looking"	2:11
5.	"Anal"	2:15
6.	"I Can't"	0:38
7.	"Pre-War"	1:07
8.	"Therapy"	1:08
9.	"Britney"	2:32
10.	"Overprotected" (Britney Spears cover)	2:37
11.	"Ask App Not to Track"	4:27
12.	"All The Things"	16:29
13.	"After the Gold Rush" (Neil Young cover)	2:47
14.	"Vicky with a "V""	14:01
15.	"I Feel Love" (Donna Summer cover)	6:13
16.	"Now More Than Ever (Intro)"	5:08
17.	"American Life" (Madonna cover)	5:18
18.	"The Pain of Loving You" (Dolly Parton and Porter Wagoner cover)	4:07
19.	"Rock the Boat" (Aaliyah cover)	5:43
20.	"My Baby Understands" (Donna Summer cover)	4:28
21.	"Now More Than Ever (Outro)"	1:21
Total length:		90:20
