= Mystery Show =

Human interest podcast from Gimlet

- Mystery Show logo
- Genre: humor, human interest

Cast and voices
- Hosted by: Starlee Kine

Music
- Opening theme: "Those Mysteries" performed by Sparks

Publication
- Original release: May 21 – July 31, 2015
- Provider: Gimlet Media

Related
- Website: gimletmedia.com/show/mystery-show/

Mystery Show is a Gimlet Media podcast hosted by Starlee Kine that ran for one season in 2015. In each episode, Kine solves a minor mystery which cannot be solved with search engines alone. It was declared the best new podcast of 2015 by iTunes.

Mysteries tackled by the show include the closing of a video rental store and the origins of a peculiar custom belt buckle. During the investigations, Kine frequently veers from the original topic, asking subjects about more personal and philosophical matters.

In October 2016, Kine announced through a Medium post and the show's Facebook page that she was no longer working at Gimlet Media and that the network would not be producing a second season of Mystery Show.

== Episodes ==
No.	Title	Original Release Date
1	"Video Store"	May 21, 2015
Laura becomes a member at a video store, rents a video and attempts to return said video the very next day, only to discover the store is completely gone.
2	"Britney"	May 30, 2015
Andrea's a writer no one reads. Then she makes a shocking discovery.
3	"Belt Buckle"	June 5, 2015
A young boy finds an enchanting object in the street.
4	"Vanity Plate"	June 14, 2015
Starlee and her friend Miranda get stopped at a red light and see something shocking.
5	"Source Code"	June 20, 2015
While watching the movie Source Code, David becomes consumed with a height related mystery.
6	"Kotter"	July 31, 2015
Jonathan has lunch in a cafeteria.

== Reception ==
Apple named Mystery Show the Best New Podcast of 2015 in their year-end awards.

Episode 3 of Season 1, "Belt Buckle", was ranked #1 on The Atlantic's list of the top 50 podcast episodes of 2015, with their summary stating that "the episode is unrelenting in its playfulness and joy, but a sense of profundity lies just beneath the surface, bobbing up in the final minutes, when you won't be sure whether to grin or weep". The show has continued to garner acclaim over the years despite not publishing new episodes since 2015; in 2021, The New York Times praised the show as “utterly captivating” and in 2022, The Guardian described the series as a “podcast classic”.

== Hiatus ==
After the conclusion of Season 1, no new episodes were released. A January update posted to the show's Facebook page stated that Season 2 was "in the works".

In October 2016, Kine published an update to Medium and to the Mystery Show Facebook page saying that she had been let go from Gimlet Media in April 2016, during the early stages of Season 2's production. The same day, Gimlet published a blog post stating that Mystery Show was "unsustainable to produce and publish on a consistent basis, and therefore Gimlet will no longer produce new episodes of Mystery Show. We are in discussions with Starlee to reach an agreement where she may produce Mystery Show independently of Gimlet."
