= Baby Ruby =

2022 film by Bess Wohl

- Theatrical release poster
- Directed by: Bess Wohl
- Written by: Bess Wohl
- Produced by: Alex Saks; Lauren Beveridge; Brett Beveridge; Jeffrey Penman
- Starring: Noémie Merlant; Kit Harington; Meredith Hagner
- Cinematography: Juan Pablo Ramírez
- Edited by: Jin Lee
- Music by: Erik Friedlander
- Production companies: Page Fifty-Four Pictures; Point Productions; FilmNation Entertainment
- Distributed by: Magnet Releasing
- Release dates: September 9, 2022 (TIFF); February 3, 2023 (United States)
- Running time: 90 minutes
- Country: United States
- Language: English
- Box office: $16,991

Baby Ruby is a 2022 American psychological horror-thriller film written and directed by Bess Wohl, in her directorial debut. It stars Noémie Merlant, Kit Harington, and Meredith Hagner.

The film had its world premiere at the Toronto International Film Festival on September 9, 2022. It was released on February 3, 2023, by Magnet Releasing.

== Plot ==
Jo (Noémie Merlant) is a lifestyle influencer. Her relationship with Spencer (Kit Harington) strengthens as they wait for the couple's first baby. After the birth of the baby, named Ruby, Jo's successful world begins to fall apart as she suffers postpartum psychosis. Jo begins to behave aggressively and doubtfully, although she receives support from Shelly (Meredith Hagner), a neighbor who claims to be a mother even though she refuses to show her supposed baby to others. Jo becomes suspicious of the intentions of Shelly and everyone around her as she tries to protect her baby, who is also seen by Jo as being hostile.

== Cast ==
- Noémie Merlant as Jo
- Kit Harington as Spencer
- Meredith Hagner as Shelly
- Reed Birney as Dr. Rosenbaum
- Jayne Atkinson as Doris

== Release ==
The film had its world premiere at the Toronto International Film Festival on September 9, 2022. Shortly after, Magnet Releasing acquired US distribution rights to the film. It was released on February 3, 2023.

== Reception ==
On the review aggregator website Rotten Tomatoes, 67% of 45 critics' reviews are positive, with an average rating of 6.3/10. The website's consensus reads: "A flawed but finely cut gem, Baby Ruby puts the horror of new parenthood under a frighteningly effective magnifying glass." Metacritic, which uses a weighted average, assigned the film a score of 57 out of 100, based on 10 critics, indicating "mixed or average" reviews.

In a review for San Francisco Chronicle, Bob Strauss wrote: "Playwright Bess Wohl’s feature-directing debut is a sly, mutant meld of horror thriller, feminist satire and subjective, postpartum paranoia study. It’s serious about how the demands of baby care can overwhelm, and skeptical of societal pressures on women to not just accept but love motherhood’s burdens." Guy Lodge of Variety called the portrayal of mental breakdown after a traumatic childbirth "evocative and appropriately aggravating", and cited Merlant's portrayal of "agonized internal plight" as a factor in keeping the audience "emotionally rooted" in the film.
