= Jeffery & Cole Casserole =

- Title card
- Genre: Sketch comedy
- Created by: Cole Escola and Jeffery Self
- Starring: Cole Escola; Jeffery Self; Max Steele
- Country of origin: United States
- Original language: English
- No. of seasons: 2
- No. of episodes: 14

Production
- Production locations: New York City, New York
- Running time: 22 minutes

Original release
- Network: Logo
- Release: June 10, 2009 – August 30, 2010

Jeffery & Cole Casserole is an American sketch comedy program that aired on Logo in 2009 and 2010. The show is written, directed and edited by real-life comedy duo Jeffery Self and Cole Escola. The series debuted on Logo June 19, 2009, and was renewed for a second season, which premiered July 9, 2010, also on Logo. The show was canceled March 17, 2011.

== Origins ==
The program originated from the internet popularity of New York-based comedy duo Jeffery Self and Cole Escola, previously known for their comedic viral videos under the YouTube moniker VGL (Very Good Looking) Gay Boys. Self and Escola have said that they were approached via Facebook by executives from Logo, who offered them a development deal after following their videos and attending one of their live shows.

== Format ==
Casserole was recorded entirely with a webcam and follows a format similar to Self and Escola's previous internet video skits. Each episode begins with Self and Escola performing an introductory skit, in which they sit in front of a webcam and welcome the audience to the show. The show then features one major plotline that is dispersed between other short, unrelated comedy segments. Many of the show's plotlines revolve around an all-girls Catholic school in which both Self and Escola portray themselves as students. The unrelated comedy segments tend to skew absurdist. The show's plotlines and its short segments are camp in nature.

The series features cameo appearances by artists from New York City's downtown performance art scene, including Bridget Everett, Erin Markey, and Max Steele, who plays Jeffery and Cole's classmate, Becky. Famous queer singer and performer Justin Bond appears in several episodes, playing the school's principal, Agnes. Pandora Boxx, a Rochester, New York drag queen made famous by the reality show "RuPaul's Drag Race," has appeared once as well as British actor Christian Coulson.

== Episodes ==
=== Season 1 (2009) ===
| No. overall | No. in season | Title | Directed by | Written by | Original release date |
|---|---|---|---|---|---|
| 1 | 1 | "The Prom" | Cole Escola; Jeffery Self | Cole Escola; Jeffery Self | June 19, 2009 |
After Cole is dumped by his prom date, Jeffery helps him find a replacement.
| 2 | 2 | "The Baby" | Cole Escola; Jeffery Self | Cole Escola; Jeffery Self | June 26, 2009 |
Cole's unexpected pregnancy forces him to drop out of Jeffery's musical, causing a rift in the friendship.
| 3 | 3 | "The Hex" | Cole Escola; Jeffery Self | Cole Escola; Jeffery Self | July 10, 2009 |
Jeffery gets hexed by a gypsy out to sabotage Cole's gift-wrapping business.
| 4 | 4 | "The Election" | Cole Escola; Jeffery Self | Cole Escola; Jeffery Self | July 17, 2009 |
Jeffery and Cole enter a bitter feud when they both decide to run for class president.
| 5 | 5 | "The Field Trip" | Cole Escola; Jeffery Self | Cole Escola; Jeffery Self | July 24, 2009 |
Jeffery and Cole go on a field trip to the National Museum of Calendars and learn a lesson from Amelia Earheart.
| 6 | 6 | "The Benefit" | Cole Escola; Jeffery Self | Cole Escola; Jeffery Self | August 7, 2009 |
Jeffery and Cole exploit a classmate in order to put on a benefit to raise money for their trip to Boca.

=== Season 2 (2010) ===
| No. overall | No. in season | Title | Directed by | Written by | Original release date |
|---|---|---|---|---|---|
| 7 | 1 | "The Jobs" | Cole Escola; Jeffery Self | Cole Escola; Jeffery Self | July 9, 2010 |
Jeffery and Cole get jobs to raise money to enter a fishing competition.
| 8 | 2 | "The New Guy" | Cole Escola; Jeffery Self | Cole Escola; Jeffery Self | July 16, 2010 |
Jeffery and Cole compete for the affections of a new guy in town.
| 9 | 3 | "The Class Ring" | Cole Escola; Jeffery Self | Cole Escola; Jeffery Self | July 23, 2010 |
Jeffery and Cole's friendship is strained when Jeffery's dad accuses Cole's mom of stealing his class ring years ago.
| 10 | 4 | "The Becky II" | Cole Escola; Jeffery Self | Cole Escola; Jeffery Self | July 30, 2010 |
Jeffery and Cole try to replace Becky when Becky finds a new friend.
| 11 | 5 | "The Teen Moms" | Cole Escola; Jeffery Self | Cole Escola; Jeffery Self | August 6, 2010 |
Jeffery and Cole decide the "in" thing to do is to become teen moms.
| 12 | 6 | "The Weather Lady" | Cole Escola; Jeffery Self | Cole Escola; Jeffery Self | August 13, 2010 |
Jeffery and Cole decide to help their favorite weather lady, when she loses her streak of predicting the weather accurately.
| 13 | 7 | "The Erin Brockovitch" | Cole Escola; Jeffery Self | Cole Escola; Jeffery Self | August 20, 2010 |
Jeffery and Cole decide to go to court to avenge a friend's death.
| 14 | 8 | "The Into the Woods" | Cole Escola; Jeffery Self | Cole Escola; Jeffery Self | August 27, 2010 |
Jeffery and Cole go into the woods.
