= John Early (comedian) =

American comedian, actor (born 1988)

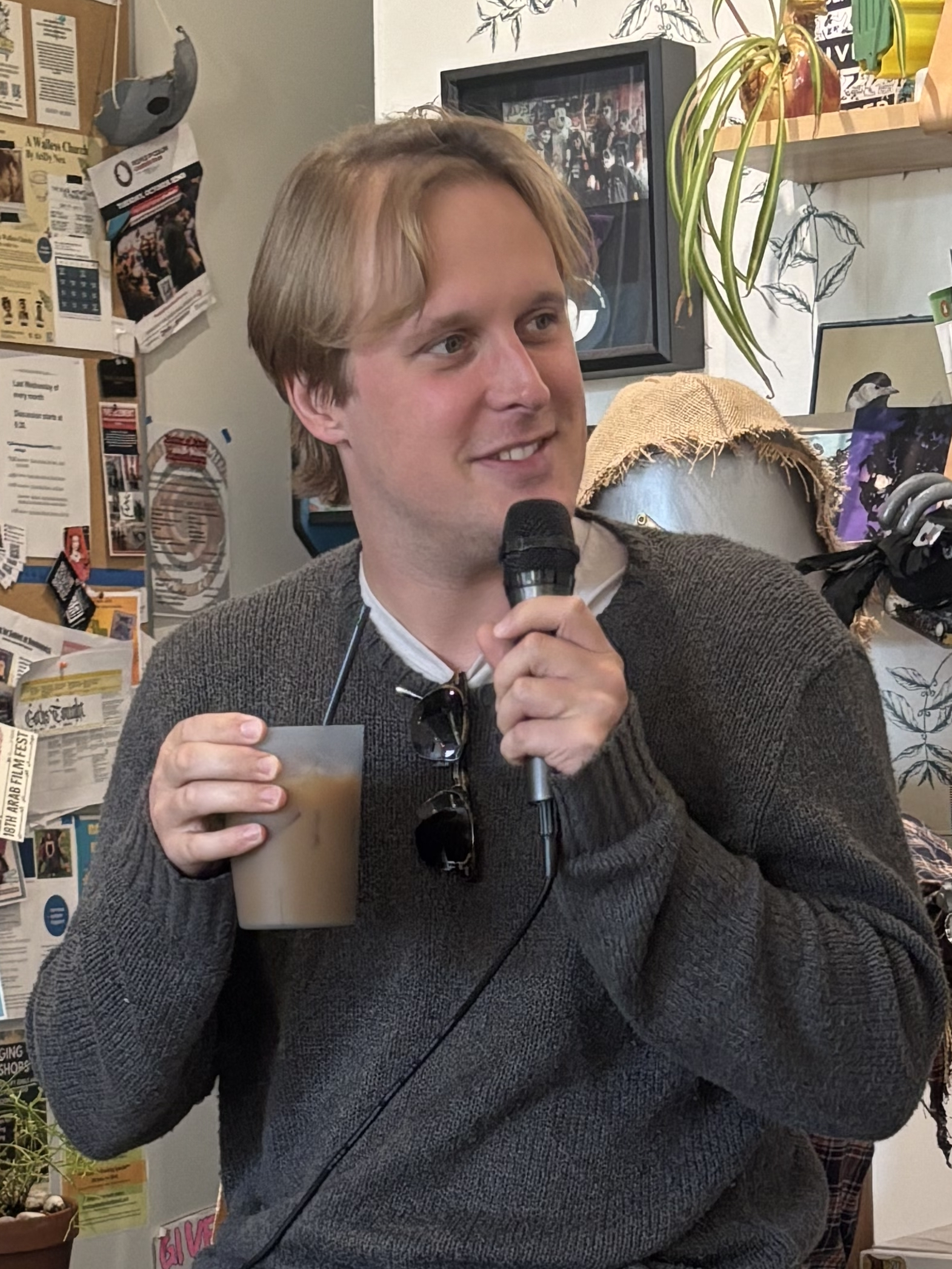
- Early in 2024
- Born: January 21, 1988 (age 38); Nashville, Tennessee, U.S.
- Education: New York University (BFA)

Comedy career
- Years active: 2012–present
- Medium: Stand-up; film; television

John Early (born January 21, 1988) is an American comedian, actor, and singer. He has appeared on 30 Rock as Jenna Maroney's son and in the independent film Fort Tilden. He starred in Search Party, which aired on TBS and HBO Max from 2016 to 2022. In 2025, he made his directorial debut with the film Maddie's Secret.

== Early life ==
Early is from Nashville, Tennessee. His father was a Presbyterian minister and his mother a minister at a church of the Disciples of Christ. As a youth, he attended Interlochen Center for the Arts during the summer.

He attended the University School of Nashville. He graduated from New York University, where he majored in acting at the Atlantic Acting School.

When he was 11, he became a big fan of Australian actress Toni Collette and ran a fan website devoted to her.

== Career ==
Early tours the country with his stand-up/variety show "Literally Me" and also hosts a monthly variety event, "Showgasm", at Ars Nova in New York City. He was featured on Lauren Lapkus's podcast With Special Guest Lauren Lapkus (Episode 41, August 28, 2015), and in Wet Hot American Summer: First Day of Camp, which was released on Netflix in 2015. He has made voice appearances on two episodes of Bob's Burgers as brunch blogger Dalton Crespin.

Early frequently collaborates with comedians such as Hamm Samwich and Kate Berlant in a variety of sketch and filmed presentations. In 2016, he wrote and starred in a 30-minute episode of the sketch show Netflix Presents: The Characters. In 2017, he and Berlant starred in the Vimeo miniseries 555, directed by Andrew DeYoung. He also had a small role as Evan in the 2017 drama Beatriz at Dinner. In 2019, Early appeared in the music video for "Squidward Nose" by Cupcakke. In July 2019, he starred in an episode of Drunk History about Martha Mitchell.

Early appeared in a sketch titled "Credit Card Roulette" in the Netflix comedy program I Think You Should Leave with Tim Robinson and in the music video for "Anti-Hero" by Taylor Swift. In 2022, Peacock released a sketch comedy special produced by Early and Berlant, Would It Kill You to Laugh?. In 2023, HBO released John Early: Now More Than Ever, a stand-up and musical comedy special, followed in 2024 by the release of the musical covers of 1970s-era songs from the special as his debut album, Now More Than Ever.

Maddie's Secret, Early's debut film as a director, premiered at the 2025 Toronto International Film Festival.

== Personal life ==
Early is gay, and a member of the Democratic Socialists of America.

== Filmography ==
=== Film ===
Year	Title	Role	Director	Notes
2013	Sardines Out of a Can	Arnie	Shonali Bhowmik	
2014	Fort Tilden	John	Sarah-Violet Bliss; Charles Rogers	
2016	Other People	Gabe	Chris Kelly	
2016	Neighbors 2: Sorority Rising	Darren	Nicholas Stoller	
2017	Beatriz at Dinner	Evan	Miguel Arteta	
2017	Fun Mom Dinner	Alfred	Alethea Jones	
2017	What Children Do	Pastor Wes	Dean Peterson	
2017	The Disaster Artist	Chris	James Franco	
2018	Thread	John	Max Rosen	Short film
2019	Late Night	Chris Reynolds	Nisha Ganatra	
2019	Good Posture	Sol	Dolly Wells	
2020	Save Yourselves!	Blake	Alex Huston Fischer; Eleanor Wilson	
2020	Inspector Ike	Chip Conrad	Graham Mason	
2022	DC League of Super-Pets	Barry Allen / The Flash	Jared Stern	Voice
2024	Stress Positions	Terry Goon	Theda Hammel	
2024	Big City Greens the Movie: Spacecation	Alexander	Anna O'Brian	Voice
2025	Maddie's Secret	Maddie	Himself	
2025	Eternity	Ryan	David Freyne	
2026	She Keeps Me Young	Daniel	Doron Max Hagay	
2026	Never Change!	Tim	Marty Schousboe	
2026	Coyote vs. Acme	Henry Heslop	Dave Green	
2027	Naughty		Olivia Wilde	Filming

=== Television ===
Year	Title	Role	Notes
2012	30 Rock	Jerome	Episode: "Standards and Practices"
2015	High Maintenance	Wayne	Episode: "Sabrina"
2015	Broad City	Brandon	Episode: "The Matrix"
2015	Wet Hot American Summer: First Day of Camp	Logan	2 episodes
2015	The Special Without Brett Davis	Tyler	Episode: "Vic & the Moose & Tyler"
2016–2018	Animals.	The Assistant, Monty, Fashion Rat 2	Voice, 4 episodes
2016	Love	Daniel	Episode: "Party in the Hills"
2016	Netflix Presents: The Characters	John the Intern, Jason, Riley, Vicky	2 episodes
2016	Difficult People	Mickey	Episode: "Kessler Epstein Foundation"
2016	Haters Back Off	Maureen The Mattress Queen	Episode: "Starr Off the Parade"
2016–2022	Search Party	Elliott Goss	Main cast
2017	Portlandia	Funeral Director	Episode: "Fred's Cell Phone Company"
2017	Wet Hot American Summer: Ten Years Later	Logan	4 episodes
2017–2021	Bob's Burgers	Dalton Crespin / Receptionist	Voice, 3 episodes
2017–2020	At Home with Amy Sedaris	Russell Schnabble	5 episodes
2018	Another Period	Reporter	Episode: "Sex Nickelodeon"
2018	Human Kind Of	Callie / Mr. Jake	Voice, 6 episodes
2018–2022	Big City Greens	Alexander	Voice, 12 episodes
2019	Los Espookys	Mark Stevens	4 episodes
2019–2022	Tuca & Bertie	Dirk / various	Voice, recurring role
2020	Helpsters	Fashion Fil	Episode: "Chef Charlie/Fashion Fil"
2020–2022	Central Park	Augustus	Voice, 2 episodes
2020–2022	Close Enough	Mr. Timothy Brice Campbell	Voice, recurring role
2021	I Think You Should Leave with Tim Robinson	Leslie	Episode: "Didn't you say there was gonna be five people at this table?"
2021	The Fungies!	Torsean / Billy Fungie	Voice, episode: "Billy Fungie"
2021–2025	The Great North	Henry Tuntley / various	Voice, recurring role
2021–2023	Summer Camp Island	Bearded Sheep	Voice, recurring role
2022	Robot Chicken	Elefun / World War I Pilot #1	Voice, episode: "May Cause Involuntary Political Discharge"
2022	Life & Beth	John	Episode: "Life & Beth"
2022–2023	The Afterparty	Detective Culp	Recurring role
2022	Killing It	Kevin Brailing	Episode: "The Kingmaker"
2022	American Dad!	Various	Voice, 2 episodes
2022	Archer	Wally	Voice, episode: "Distraction Action"
2022	Rick and Morty	Grand Orbship Council-Member	Voice, episode: "Analyze Piss"
2022	Would It Kill You to Laugh?	Himself	Comedy special
2023	John Early: Now More Than Ever	Himself	HBO comedy special
2024	Girls5eva	Chuck Dennis	Episode: "Bomont"
2024	Laid	Himself	Episode: "Flagstaff"
2024	The Simpsons	Joel	Voice, episode: "Convenience Airways"
2025	Very Important People	Bill	Episode: "Barbara and Bill"
2025	Long Story Short	Jean-Pierre	Voice, episode: "Hannah's Dance Recital"
2025	Universal Basic Guys	Kardgen	Voice, episode: "I Am Jar"
2026	The Comeback	Josh Abrams	3 episodes
2026	King of the Hill	Dave Veal	Voice, episode: "No-Cuddle Offense"

=== Music videos ===
Year	Title	Performer(s)	Album
2019	"Squidward Nose"	Cupcakke	Not applicable
2022	"Anti-Hero"	Taylor Swift	Midnights

=== Theatre ===
Year	Title	Role	Venue	Ref.
2025	What We Did Before Our Moth Days	Tim	Greenwich House Theatre	

== Discography ==
- 2024: Now More Than Ever
