= David Sims =

David Sims may refer to:

- Dave Sims (born 1953), Seattle-based sportscaster
- Dave Sims (rugby union) (1969–2022), rugby player
- Dave Sims (swimmer), member of the USA's 1980 Olympic team
- David Sims (biologist) (born 1969), professor in marine biology
- David Sims (critic), The Atlantic film critic and co-host of Blank Check with Griffin & David
- David Sims (director) (born 1948), New Zealand film director
- David Sims (photographer) (born 1966), British fashion and beauty photographer
- David Sims (running back) (born 1955), former American football running back with the Seattle Seahawks
- David Sims (safety) (born 1986), American football safety for the Indianapolis Colts
- David Wm. Sims (born 1963), American musician
- Davy Sims (born 1956), broadcaster, writer and communications consultant from Northern Ireland

== See also ==
- Dave Sim (born 1956), Canadian comic book writer
- Dave Sime (1936–2016), athlete
- David J. Simms (1933–2018), Indian-born Irish mathematician
