= Clare McNulty =

American actress

- Born: October 15, 1984 (age 41)
- Education: Oberlin College
- Occupation: Actress
- Relatives: James F. McNulty Jr. (grandfather)

Clare Caitlin McNulty (born October 15, 1984) is an American actress. She is best known for playing Allie in the independent comedy film Fort Tilden (2014) and Chantal Witherbottom on the HBO Max dark comedy television series Search Party (2016–2022).

== Biography ==
Born on October 15, 1984, Clare Caitlin McNulty is the daughter of Michael and Linda McNulty. She grew up in Tucson, Arizona. She graduated from University High School in Tucson and attended Oberlin College, where she met Sarah-Violet Bliss, and graduated in 2007. Her interest in acting began when she participated in a theater workshop while she was a high-school student. She is the granddaughter of James F. McNulty Jr., who was a U. S. Congressman from Arizona.

McNulty, an award-winning soprano, sang with the Tucson Girls Chorus when she was in high school.

As of 2015, McNulty resides in Ditmas Park, Brooklyn. In 2022, she signed with Key Talent Management.

Fort Tilden, in which McNulty starred, won the Grand Jury Award at the 2014 SXSW Film Festival.

== Acting credits ==
=== Film ===
Year	Title	Role	Ref.
2014	Fort Tilden	Allie	
2016	Mad	Dr. Bolden	
2019	We Used to Know Each Other		

=== Television ===
Year	Title	Role	Notes	Ref.
2014	High Maintenance	Actress	1 episode	
2016–2022	Search Party	Chantal Witherbottom	27 episodes	
2024	The Conners	Amanda	1 episode	
2024	Night Court	Layla	1 episode	
2024	Loot	Louise	1 episode	
2025	Platonic	Dr. Rapaport	Episode: "Fore!"	

=== Theater ===
Year	Title	Role	Venue	Ref.
2014	Powerhouse	Mitzi	New Ohio Theatre	
