= Jeffery Self =

American actor and comedian (born 1987)

- Born: February 19, 1987 (age 39)
- Occupations: Actor; writer; comedian
- Years active: 2009–present
- Spouse: Augustus Prew (m. 2018)

Jeffery Self (born February 19, 1987) is an American actor, writer, and comedian.

== Early life ==
Self is a native of Georgia, who grew up in the South. After attending middle school, Self persuaded his parents to let him be homeschooled.

== Career ==
Self has appeared in many television shows as a recurring, featured or guest actor. He and Cole Escola starred in the sketch comedy series Jeffery & Cole Casserole, which aired on Logo TV for two seasons. He has also appeared in Desperate Housewives, 90210, Hot in Cleveland, Torchwood, Shameless, Difficult People, and as Liz Lemon's cousin Randy Lemon on NBC's 30 Rock. He is the author of two humor books: Fifty Shades Of Gay and Straight People: A Spotters Guide, as well as the young adult novels A Very Very Bad Thing and Drag Teen. He co-wrote, produced, and starred in the indie horror/comedy cult hit You're Killing Me. He was the host of the MTV series, Scream: After Dark, a talk show devoted to deleted scenes and interviews with the cast of the popular MTV horror series Scream. He most recently played Marc Doober on Search Party on HBO Max.

== Personal life ==
Self is gay. He dated Patrick McDonald of Fire Island for three years and publicly blogged about their breakup. On January 8, 2017, Self and his boyfriend, Augustus Prew, announced their engagement via Instagram. They were married on January 13, 2018, in Culver City, California. Self's mother-in-law is the fashion designer Wendy Dagworthy.

== Filmography ==
=== Film ===
Year	Title	Role	Notes
2009	The Book of Ruth: Journey of Faith	Townsperson	Uncredited
2011	Eirik/Ben	Eirik	
2013	Paragon School for Girls	Millicent	
2015	You're Killing Me	George	
2019	California No	Jeffery	
2020	The High Note	Josh	
2021	7 Days	Dr. Henry	
2022	Mack & Rita	Sam	
2022	Spoiler Alert	Nick	
2025	Drop	Matt	

=== Television ===
Year	Title	Role	Notes
2009–2010	Jeffery & Cole Casserole	Jeffery	13 episodes
2010	30 Rock	Randy Lemon	Episode: "Klaus and Greta"
2010	90210	Ilon	3 episodes
2011	Hot in Cleveland	Waiter	Episode: "I Love Lucci: Part One"
2011	Shameless	Grant	Episode: "It's Time to Kill the Turtle"
2011	Torchwood	James Percey	Episode: "Rendition"
2011	Friends with Benefits	Packard	Episode: "The Benefit of Full Disclosure"
2012	Desperate Housewives	Brian	Episode: "Any Moment"
2012	Co-op of the Damned	Dave	Episode: "Rosemary's Other Baby"
2013	Ladies' Man: A Made Movie	Xavier	Television film
2014	Gay of Thrones	Jeffery	10 episodes
2015	Difficult People	Carl	Episode: "Premium Membership"
2015	Not Looking	Lee	4 episodes
2016–2022	Search Party	Marc	23 episodes
2017	Throwing Shade	Gay Man 1	Episode #1.5
2018	The Demons of Dorian Gunn	Dorian Gunn	Television film
2019	Lovestruck	Kevin	Television film
2023	The Horror of Dolores Roach	Caleb Sweetzer	3 episodes
2026	The Creep Tapes	Connor	Episode 3 Season 3 "Anisha"
