= Cole Escola =

American comedian, actor, and writer (born 1986)

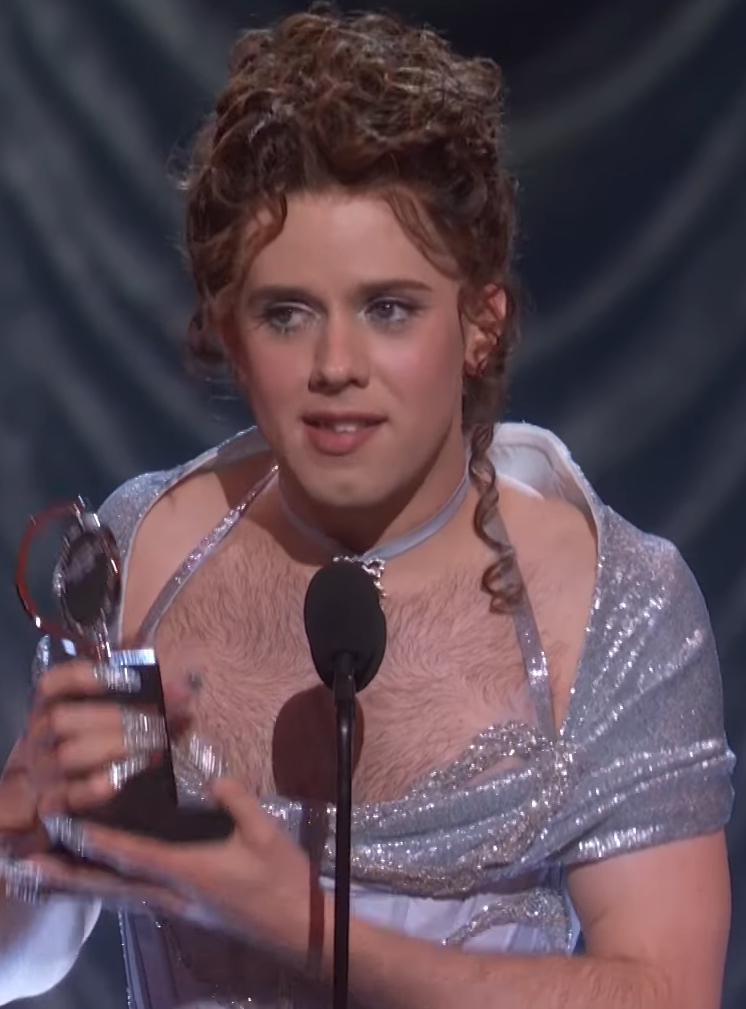
- Escola accepting the 2025 Tony Award for Best Actor in a Play
- Born: November 25, 1986 (age 39); Clatskanie, Oregon, U.S.
- Education: Marymount Manhattan College
- Notable work: Oh, Mary!

Comedy career
- Years active: 2009–present
- Medium: Television; theatre
- Genre: Surreal comedy

Cole Escola (born November 25, 1986) is an American comedian, actor, and playwright. They are best known for their cabaret work and appearances on the television series Difficult People (2015–2017), At Home with Amy Sedaris (2017–2020), Search Party (2020–2021), and Big Mouth (2022), as well as for writing and starring in the play Oh, Mary! which opened on Broadway in 2024. Escola received two nominations for two Tony Awards for their work on Oh, Mary!, winning the Tony Award for Best Actor in a Play. They were named a finalist for the Pulitzer Prize for Drama, and won a Laurence Olivier Award when the play moved to the West End.

== Early life ==
Escola was born and raised in Clatskanie, Oregon. They are of Finnish and Norwegian descent. When they were six, their father chased the family out of their mobile home with a gun, after which Escola, their mother, and their brother subsequently lived in government housing.

Escola participated in community theater and starred in high school productions of Fiddler on the Roof, Les Misérables, and Little Shop of Horrors. After graduating from R. A. Long High School in 2005, Escola moved to New York City to study humanities at Marymount Manhattan College, dropping out after one year. They subsequently performed at children's birthday parties and worked at the Scholastic bookstore. They supported themself during this period working at a vegan bakery and as a sex worker.

== Career ==
=== Stage ===
From 2008 to 2012, Escola was a regular guest performer in the Our Hit Parade cabaret series, and later began performing monthly solo shows at the Duplex Cabaret Theatre. They appeared in Scott Wittman's 2012 cabaret show Jukebox Jackie at La MaMa and played an unborn fetus in Bridget Everett's 2014 cabaret show Rock Bottom at Joe's Pub. In a sketch called Queers in History, Escola strutted "jauntily across the stage wearing a newsboy cap and underwear." On June 14, 2017, Escola's hour-long solo show Help! I'm Stuck premiered at Joe's Pub, where it has since played numerous sold-out engagements.

In 2013, Escola played Roland Maule in the Two River Theater revival of Noël Coward's Present Laughter.

In 2024, Escola wrote and starred in their play Oh, Mary! at the Lucille Lortel Theatre, in which they played First Lady Mary Todd Lincoln. It was directed by Sam Pinkleton and also starred Conrad Ricamora and James Scully. The show transferred to Broadway in July 2024, marking Escola's Broadway debut as an actor and playwright. At the 2024 Outer Critics Circle Awards, Escola was awarded the John Gassner Award for Oh, Mary!. The piece was a 2025 finalist for the Pulitzer Prize for Drama. Escola won the Tony Award for Best Actor in a Play in 2025, for their performance in Oh, Mary!, becoming the first openly non-binary performer to win a Tony in that category.

In October 2024, Escola was included in the Time 100 Next list of the world's most influential rising leaders.

On May 26, 2026, it was announced that Escola would succeed Catherine Tate in the West End production of Oh, Mary!.

=== Television ===
In 2008, Escola met fellow comedian Jeffery Self in New York; bonding over a shared love of theater and 1990s sitcoms, they began creating surreal, semi-scripted YouTube videos under the moniker "Very Good Looking (VGL) Gay Boys." The sketches, in which Escola often played the demented comic foil to Self's straight man, received over 100,000 views, prompting coverage in New York magazine and a development deal from Logo TV. Jeffery & Cole Casserole premiered on Logo on June 19, 2009; it ran for two seasons and has been deemed as a "cult classic" by Vice magazine. Escola and Self wrote the screenplay for an as-yet-unproduced comedy in which two friends "have to go through a lot to redeem their free sandwich."

From 2015 to 2017, Escola played Matthew on the Hulu television series Difficult People, a role that series creator Julie Klausner wrote with them in mind. They have appeared in recurring roles on Mozart in the Jungle, Girlboss, and At Home with Amy Sedaris, in which they play Sedaris' neighbor, Chassie Tucker. In 2020, Escola appeared as Chip (The Twink) on the HBO Max original Search Party. Chip became a season regular in season 4. Escola voiced The Secret Keeper on the Cartoon Network animated series Craig of the Creek in the episode "Secret in a Bottle". In 2021, Escola voiced a gargoyle in an episode of What We Do in the Shadows.

In 2025, Escola was announced for the role of Bon Clay in the third season of the Netflix television series One Piece.

=== Film ===
Escola is writing a Miss Piggy film, in collaboration with producers Emma Stone and Jennifer Lawrence.

== Personal life ==
In 2021, Escola came out as non-binary.

== Acting credits ==
=== Film ===
Year	Title	Role	Notes
2010	Size Zero	(voice)	Video short
2013	Junkie Doctors	Boy (Older)	Short
2013	Your Future One Dollar	Trevor	Short
2013	Billy & Rachel's Halloween Adventure	Unnamed role	Short
2015	Monologue for a Teenage Boy	Unnamed role	Video short
2015	Mom Commercial	Mom	Video short
2018	Wild Nights with Emily	Dweeby Reader	
2021	Normal Gays	Unnamed role	Short
2022	Please Baby Please	Billy	
2024	Boys Go to Jupiter	Old Slippy	Voice role

=== Television ===
Year	Title	Role	Notes
2009	Law & Order	Tim Johnson	Episode: "Reality Bites"
2009–2010	Jeffery & Cole Casserole	Cole	13 episodes
2010	Submissions Only	Gay 3	Web series, episode: "Old Lace"
2012	Local Talent	Drew	Episode: "Pilot"
2012	Jack in a Box	Beau	Web series, 3 episodes: "The Staff Meeting", "The Pest" and "The Bonding"
2013	The 3 Bits	Henry Bits	3 episodes: "Henry", "Henry: Part 2" and "Henry: Part 3"
2013	Smash	Coat Check Clerk	Episode: "The Parents"
2013	Ladies' Man: A MADE Movie	Ollie	TV movie on MTV
2014	Nurse Jackie	Robin	Episode: "Super Greens"
2015	Monica	Charles	2 episodes: "Episode #1.3" and "Episode #1.6"
2015	6 Keys to Unlocking Your Diva-Tential	Jessup	TV movie
2015	The Battery's Down	Crisch	Web series, episode: "Reunion"
2015–2017	The Special Without Brett Davis	Joyce Conner or Granny Lou	4 episodes
2015–2017	Difficult People	Matthew	25 episodes
2016	The Chris Gethard Show	The Human Fish's Mother	Episode: "Under the Sea Prom"
2016	The Characters	Booker / Cole	Episode: "John Early"
2016–2018	Mozart in the Jungle	Shawn	10 episodes
2017	New York Is Dead	Colton	Web series, episode: "Episode #1.4"
2017	Girlboss	Nathan	4 episodes
2017	Man Seeking Woman	Chris	4 episodes
2017–2020	At Home with Amy Sedaris	Chassie Tucker / Chassie / Singer No. 1	24 episodes
2019–2022	Tuca & Bertie	Pastry Pete's Nephew (voice)	13 episodes
2019–2020	National Lampoon Radio Hour	Various / Maven Crawford	10 episodes
2020	The Shivering Truth	Ike (voice)	Episode: "The Burn Earner Spits"
2020–2021	Search Party	Chip Wreck	10 episodes
2020–2022	Craig of the Creek	The Secret Keeper (voice)	2 episodes: "Secret in a Bottle" and "Silver Fist Returns"
2021	Summer Camp Island	Sea Slug (voice)	Episode: "Sea Bunnies"
2021	What We Do in the Shadows	Gargoyle (voice)	Episode: "The Escape"
2021–2023	Teenage Euthanasia	Dillan Jeremy / various (voice)	5 episodes
2021–2022	Ziwe	Various characters	5 episodes; also writer
2021–2024	Baby Shark's Big Show!	Goldie / various (voice)	47 episodes
2022	Would I Lie to You?	Self	Episode: "Allowance PowerPoint"
2022	Big Mouth	Montel / Alison (voice)	7 episodes
2023	Frog and Toad	Gopher (voice)	7 episodes
2023	Digman!	Gustavia (voice)	Episode: "The Puff People"
2023	Human Resources	Montel (voice)	8 episodes
2024	Life & Beth	Cole	4 episodes
2024	The Girls on the Bus	Dale	4 episodes
2024	Fantasmas	Dina	Episode: "The Void"
2025	Jeopardy!	Self/Mary Todd Lincoln	April 14, 2025, episode; clue presenter
2025	King of Drag	Self; Guest judge	1 episode
2025	The Simpsons	Devin (voice)	3 episodes
2025	Super Duper Bunny League	Varmint (voice)	Episode: "Hoot'n Annie"

=== Theater ===
Year	Title	Role	Venue	Notes
2024	Oh, Mary!	Mary Todd Lincoln	Lucille Lortel Theatre	Off-Broadway
2024–2025	Oh, Mary!	Mary Todd Lincoln	Lyceum Theatre	Broadway debut
2026	Oh, Mary!	Mary Todd Lincoln	Trafalgar Theatre	West End debut

== Awards and nominations ==
Year	Award	Category	Work	Result
2020	Writers Guild of America Award	Comedy/Variety – Sketch Series	At Home with Amy Sedaris	Nominated
2021	Writers Guild of America Award	Comedy/Variety – Sketch Series	At Home with Amy Sedaris	Won
2022	Writers Guild of America Award	Comedy Series	Hacks	Won
2022	Writers Guild of America Award	New Series	Hacks	Won
2022	Queerty Award	Best TV Performance	Search Party	Nominated
2024	Drama Desk Award	Sam Norkin Off-Broadway Award	Oh, Mary!	Won
2024	Drama League Award	Distinguished Performance	Oh, Mary!	Nominated
2024	Drama League Award	Outstanding Production of a Play	Oh, Mary!	Nominated
2024	Off-Broadway Alliance Awards	Best New Play	Oh, Mary!	Won
2024	Outer Critics Circle Award	John Gassner Award for New American Play	Oh, Mary!	Won
2024	Outer Critics Circle Award	Outstanding Lead Performer in an Off-Broadway Play	Oh, Mary!	Won
2024	Theatre World Award		Oh, Mary!	Won
2024	Obie Awards	Performance	Oh, Mary!	Won
2025	GLAAD Media Award	Outstanding Broadway Production	Oh, Mary!	Won
2025	Drama League Award	Distinguished Performance	Oh, Mary!	Nominated
2025	Drama League Award	Outstanding Production of a Play	Oh, Mary!	Won
2025	Pulitzer Prize	Pulitzer Prize for Drama	Oh, Mary!	Finalist
2025	Tony Award	Best Play	Oh, Mary!	Nominated
2025	Tony Award	Best Performance by a Leading Actor in a Play	Oh, Mary!	Won
2025	Queerty Awards	Icon Award	Themself	Honored
2025	Dorian Award	LGBTQ Theater Artist of the Season		Won
2026	Laurence Olivier Awards	Best Entertainment or Comedy Play	Oh, Mary!	Won
