= Fort Tilden (film) =

- Theatrical release poster
- Directed by: Sarah-Violet Bliss; Charles Rogers
- Written by: Sarah-Violet Bliss; Charles Rogers
- Produced by: Mollye Asher; Geoff Mansfield
- Starring: Bridey Elliott; Clare McNulty; Neil Casey; Alysia Reiner; Peter Vack; Griffin Newman
- Cinematography: Brian Lannin
- Edited by: Sarah-Violet Bliss
- Music by: Alexander Moro
- Distributed by: Orion Pictures
- Release dates: March 8, 2014 (SXSW); August 14, 2015 (United States)
- Running time: 95 minutes
- Country: United States
- Language: English

Fort Tilden is a 2014 American independent comedy film, written and directed by Sarah-Violet Bliss and Charles Rogers, starring Bridey Elliott, Clare McNulty, Neil Casey, Alysia Reiner, and Peter Vack.

The film had its world premiere at SXSW on March 8, 2014, where it won that year's Grand Jury Award. The film was acquired by revived Orion Pictures and was released on August 14, 2015, in a limited release, and through video on demand.

== Plot ==
While at a rooftop gathering for their twin musician friends, roommates Allie and Harper meet two guys, Russ and Sam. After the boys announce that they will be spending the day at Fort Tilden the girls make plans to meet them and bring them ecstasy.

The following day, after realizing that the ferries are closed, the girls decide to bike to Fort Tilden and borrow a bike from their upstairs neighbor, Ebb. They pick up the drugs from Harper's friend Benji, who mocks her for being a dilettante who only pretends to be an artist. While riding through Brooklyn Harper has them stop in front of a cheap clothing store. When Allie realizes that she has not brought a bike lock, Harper urges her to simply wrap the chain around the bikes. While standing in line they watch as a boy steals Allie's bike, but because of their hesitation whether to confront him or not he easily makes off with the bike. Harper urges Allie to leave Ebb's bike behind, which she eventually does, covering it in trash so that it will not be stolen.

The girls call a cab driver who offers to take them to Fort Tilden for a hundred dollars. While in the car Allie grows frustrated because her contact for the Peace Corps, Cabiria, keeps contacting her in order to obtain her information. Giving up on her Harper makes small talk with the driver, who is from Calcutta and mentions having been there. However, after Harper mentions what her father does they are thrown out of the car by the cabbie, who tells her her father "is a criminal and a bully".

The girls walk the rest of the way to Fort Tilden, but upon arrival at the beach discover they are at Jacob Riis Park. Wandering around they stumble upon three abandoned kittens whom they decide to rescue. While walking Allie receives a text from Cabiria, who asks her how she is enjoying the beach and Allie realizes that Harper posted a picture of her in her bathing suit on Instagram. Frustrated, the girls abandon the kittens in a trash can, reasoning that they left them better than they found them.

As they continue searching for Fort Tilden, they receive a text from the boys that they are at Jacob Riis. The girls finally return there and on their way finally pass Fort Tilden. Upon arrival at Jacob Riis they see the boys are with two girls who are topless. Reluctantly, Harper and Allie take their tops off too. Despite the fact that the sun is going down Harper pulls Russ into the water where she tries to have sex with him. Meanwhile, Allie discovers through conversation that the girls, Russ and Sam are all in high school. As the four high school friends leave Sam invites Allie to his mom's house. Allie instead goes to Harper in the water and tells her the kids are in high school.

Afterwards Allie and Harper call a cab and go back to their apartment in Williamsburg. On the way Harper calls 911 and tells the operator about the kittens in the trash can. He tells her to take them out as it is about to rain and they will drown. She hangs up on him.

At home Allie goes to see Ebb and tells him she abandoned his bike, is unwilling to get it, and will probably not be going into the Peace Corps after all. Returning to her apartment she sees Harper having a conversation with her father where she tells him she misses him and asks him how he figured out life at her age. After the conversation ends the two girls curl up with toast and listen to the latest song from their twin musician friends.

== Cast ==
- Bridey Elliott as Harper
- Clare McNulty as Allie
- Neil Casey as Ebb
- Alysia Reiner as Cobble Hill Mom
- Reggie Watts as himself
- Peter Vack as Benji
- Griffin Newman as Sam
- Max Jenkins as Ashley

== Release ==
Once the film had completed production, a Kickstarter campaign was launched in order to help the film find a proper film festival launch to find distribution and complete post-production. The film had its world premiere at the SXSW film festival on March 8, 2014. The film was acquired by Orion Pictures for the United States and Latin America and was released on August 14, 2015, in a limited release, and through video on demand.

== Reception ==
On review aggregate website Rotten Tomatoes, Fort Tilden has an approval rating of 88% based on 34 reviews. The site's critics consensus reads, "Difficult to watch but ultimately all the more rewarding for it, Fort Tilden offers an intriguing calling card for writer-directors Sarah-Violet Bliss and Charles Rogers." On Metacritic, the film has a score of 70 based on 16 reviews, indicating "generally favorable" reviews.

The film received generally positive reviews from major critics. Andy Webster of The New York Times said that "rarely has a movie so humorously illustrated the meaning of 'frenemy'", David Edelstein of New York Magazine called Fort Tilden "a brisk comedy packed with sharply drawn characters", and Katie Walsh of the Los Angeles Times said that the film "has an easy, funky groove and captures the sweaty perfection of a New York City summer, where things always look better on Instagram".
