= Starlee Kine =

American radio producer (born 1975)

- Presentation by Starlee Kine from the 2016 XOXO festival.
- Born: April 8, 1975 (age 50); California, United States
- Occupation(s): Writer, radio producer

Starlee Kine (born April 8, 1975) is an American public radio producer and writer.

== Early life ==
Kine grew up in the Los Angeles area.

Kine studied play and screen writing at New York University, and then began working for the This American Life radio show, initially as an intern.

== Career ==
Starlee Kine worked as producer, writer, and/or narrator on This American Life, including on several episodes that initially aired between 1997 and 2013.

Kine was the creator and host of the podcast Mystery Show, which was done in production with Gimlet Media. Her work has been featured on This American Life. She was a frequent guest on the CBC Radio show WireTap. Her writing has appeared in the New York Times Magazine and California Sunday.

On April 30, 2015, Gimlet Media announced Kine would be the host of its new podcast, Mystery Show. The show's first episode was released on May 22, 2015.

In early 2016, she was an artist-in-residence at the MacDowell Colony. On March 4, 2016, she presented a sampling of her work and a teaser of a mystery-in-progress at the Monadnock Cultural Center in Peterborough, New Hampshire.

In April 2016, Kine announced that Mystery Show would no longer be produced at Gimlet Media.

Kine served as an editorial advisor on Serial Productions's S-Town podcast.

Kine has had a few acting roles such as the voice of Tina from the Cartoon Network webseries DIY. She was part of the cast of the first season of The Shivering Truth, an Adult Swim series created by Vernon Chatman.

In March 2020, Kine, along with David Rees and Jon Kimball, returned to host the political podcast Election Profit Makers covering the prediction market website PredictIt in the lead up to the 2020 US presidential election. Kine, Rees and Kimball previously hosted Election Profit Makers prior to the 2016 US presidential election.

Kine was a writer for the television series Search Party.

Kine was featured in Flipside, a 2023 documentary film about creativity, compromise, disappointment and acceptance.

== This American Life work ==
- Episode 75 – Kindness of Strangers
- Episode 146 – Urban Nature
- Episode 183 – Missing Parents' Bureau
- Episode 205 – Plan B
- Episode 208 – Office Politics
- Episode 223 – Classifieds
- Episode 226 – Reruns
- Episode 231 – Time to Save the World
- Episode 238 – Lost in Translation
- Episode 241 - 20 Acts in 60 Minutes, Act One
- Episode 248 – Like It Or Not
- Episode 259 – Promised Land
- Episode 261 – The Sanctity of Marriage
- Episode 277 – Apology
- Episode 283 – Remember Me
- Episode 335 – Big Wide World
- Episode 339 – Break-Up
- Episode 354 – Mistakes Were Made
- Episode 379 – Return to the Scene of the Crime
- Episode 424 – Kid Politics
- Episode 514 – Thought That Counts
