= Sarah-Violet Bliss =

American screenwriter and director

- Born: Sarah-Violet Bliss; 14 April 1984 (age 42); Brooklyn, New York City, New York, USA
- Education: Oberlin College, New York University Tisch School of the Arts
- Occupations: Actress; film director; producer; film editor
- Years active: 2010–present

Sarah-Violet Bliss is an American screenwriter and director best known for writing and directing the independent comedy film Fort Tilden and the TBS dark comedy television series Search Party.

== Career ==
Bliss attended New York University's MFA Film Program. While there she collaborated with James Franco and eleven other student filmmakers to co-direct The Color of Time, a film on the life of poet C.K. Williams that starred Franco, Mila Kunis and Jessica Chastain. The film premiered at the 2012 Rome Film Festival. The film was released on December 12, 2014, in a limited release and through video on demand by Starz Digital Media.

=== Fort Tilden ===
In 2014, her film Fort Tilden, written and directed in collaboration with Charles Rogers, premiered at SXSW on March 8, 2014, where it won the SXSW Grand Jury award. The film was acquired by revived Orion Pictures and was released on August 14, 2015, in a limited release, and through video on demand. The film received generally positive reviews from major critics. Andy Webster of The New York Times said that "rarely has a movie so humorously illustrated the meaning of 'frenemy'", David Edelstein of New York Magazine called Fort Tilden "a brisk comedy packed with sharply drawn characters", and Katie Walsh of the Los Angeles Times said that the film "has an easy, funky groove and captures the sweaty perfection of a New York City summer, where things always look better on Instagram".

=== Search Party ===
Bliss and Rogers teamed up again for the 2016 comedy/mystery TBS television series Search Party, along with Michael Showalter, which stars Alia Shawkat as Dory, John Early as Elliott, John Reynolds as Drew, Meredith Hagner as Portia, and Brandon Micheal Hall as Julian.

Search Party received critical acclaim; the Los Angeles Times wrote that it was "tightly made and effective on multiple levels", GQ wrote that it is "a flawless oddity, a once-in-a-lifetime piece of art. It's not the weekend's best show, it's the year's best." and the series holds a 100% approval rating on review aggregator website Rotten Tomatoes, based on 20 reviews, with an average rating of 8.1/10. On Metacritic, the season holds a rating of 81 out of 100, based on 18 critics, indicating "universal acclaim". The second season of Search Party premiered on TBS on November 19, 2017 and received positive reviews from television critics. It holds a 95% approval rating on Rotten Tomatoes and was called a "biting satire made for the Trump era" by Vanity Fair. When the show was renewed for season 5, both Bliss and Rogers signed a deal with HBO Max.

=== Television ===
In addition to her work on Search Party, Bliss has worked as a writer on the first and second seasons of the Netflix series Wet Hot American Summer as well as for the second season of the Amazon series Mozart in the Jungle which won the Golden Globe Award for Best Television Series – Musical or Comedy.

Bliss has appeared on multiple episodes of The George Lucas Talk Show, including the May the AR Be LI$$ You Arli$$ marathon streams, as well as The George Lucas Holiday Special.

== Recognition ==
In 2017, The Hollywood Reporter named Bliss and Rogers "Hollywood Power Showrunners: Ones To Watch" in their annual list of the top 50 television showrunners and in 2016, the creative duo were named Variety's 10 Writers to Watch. She was also named one of BuzzFeed's 36 Female Creators Who Made Great TV in 2016.
