= Meredith Hagner =

American actress (born 1987)

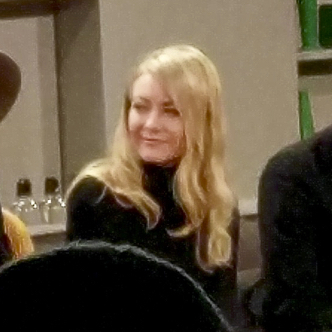
- Hagner at the 2020 Sundance Film Festival
- Born: Meredith Kathleen Hagner; May 31, 1987 (age 39); New York City, U.S.
- Education: Boston Conservatory
- Occupation: Actress
- Years active: 2008–present
- Spouse: Wyatt Russell (m. 2019)
- Children: 2

Meredith Kathleen Hagner (born May 31, 1987) is an American actress. She began her career portraying Liberty Ciccone on the CBS soap opera As the World Turns (2008–2010), which earned her a Daytime Emmy Award nomination for Outstanding Younger Actress in a Drama Series in 2009. Following her departure from As the World Turns, she appeared as a series regular on the FX drama Lights Out (2011) and the TBS sitcom Men at Work (2012–2014).

Hagner gained further prominence for her role as Portia Davenport in the TBS and HBO Max dark comedy series Search Party (2016–2022), receiving critical praise for her performance. She also appeared as a series regular on the Facebook Watch comedy-drama Strangers (2017–2018) the Quibi comedy Dummy (2020), and the Apple TV+ black comedy crime series Bad Monkey (2024). Hagner's film roles include Hits (2014), Folk Hero & Funny Guy (2016), The Oath (2018), Brightburn (2019), Palm Springs (2020), and You're Cordially Invited (2025).

== Early life ==
Hagner was born in New York City and grew up in Houston, Texas, and Chapel Hill, North Carolina. She attended Chapel Hill High School, graduating in 2005. She attended the Boston Conservatory for a year, but moved to New York after being offered acting opportunities. While in New York, she was cast in television and radio advertisements for 3M, Acuvue, JCPenney, Levi's, Radio Shack, Subway, and Truth.

== Career ==
Hagner made her screen debut in the CBS daytime soap opera As the World Turns in 2008, as Liberty Ciccone, the illegitimate daughter of Brad Snyder and Janet Ciccone. She was nominated for a Daytime Emmy Award for Outstanding Younger Actress in a Drama Series in 2009. Hagner ended her two-year run as the character in March 2010, for a career on primetime television and feature film.

Hagner starred in the FX short-lived 2011 drama series Lights Out. She later was cast as lead on The CW pilot Awakening, but it was not picked up to become a series. Hagner also appeared in a recurring role in the medical comedy Royal Pains on USA Network as Libby, a teenager with an extreme case of cyberchondria from 2009 to 2011, and guest-starred on In Plain Sight, CSI: Miami, and The Following. In 2012, Hagner began starring as Amy Jordan in the TBS comedy series Men at Work. The series was canceled after three seasons in 2014.

In 2016, Hagner returned to network television in TBS dark comedy Search Party. Hagner stars in all five seasons as the accidentally investigative sidekick, Portia Davenport. Her portrayal of the shallow hipster actress was named by Rolling Stone magazine as one of the "20 Best TV Characters In 2016".

In 2024, Hagner had a main cast role in the AppleTV+ series Bad Monkey.

== Personal life ==
Hagner began a relationship with actor Wyatt Russell after meeting on the set of the film Folk Hero & Funny Guy in 2015. They became engaged in December 2018 and married in 2019. In November 2020, the couple announced they were expecting their first child. Their first son was born in March 2021. Their second son was born in February 2024.

== Filmography ==
=== Film ===
Key
†	Denotes films that have not yet been released

Year	Title	Role	Notes
2010	Going the Distance	Tanning Salon Employee	
2011	Damsels in Distress	Alice	
2012	Art Machine	Alexia	
2014	Hits	Katelyn Stuben	
2014	We'll Never Have Paris	Leah	
2015	Creative Control	Becky	
2015	Irrational Man	Sandy	
2016	Club Policy	Kelly	Short film
2016	Folk Hero & Funny Guy	Bryn	
2016	Urge	Club Girl #2	
2016	Dream Girl	Lena	Short film
2017	Ingrid Goes West	Charlotte Buckwald	
2018	Set It Up	Becca	
2018	The Oath	Abbie Bunton	
2019	Brightburn	Merilee McNichol	
2020	Palm Springs	Misty	
2020	Horse Girl	Heather	
2021	Vacation Friends	Kyla	
2022	The Hater	Greta	
2022	Baby Ruby	Shelly	
2023	Joy Ride	Jess	
2023	Vacation Friends 2	Kyla	
2025	You're Cordially Invited	Neve	
TBA	Scorn †	TBA	Filming

=== Television ===
Key
†	Denotes television productions that have not yet been released

Year	Title	Role	Notes
2008–2010	As the World Turns	Liberty Ciccone	164 episodes
2009–2016	Royal Pains	Libby	7 episodes
2011	Lights Out	Ava Leary	13 episodes
2011	In Plain Sight	Beth Harris	Episode: "Meet the Shannons"
2011	CSI: Miami	Jan Gramercy	Episode: "Crowned"
2012–2014	Men at Work	Amy Jordan	22 episodes
2013	The Following	Aimee	Episode: "The End Is Near"
2014	Louie	Alison	Episode: "In the Woods: Part 2"
2015	Benders	Tanya	Episode: "Nice Day for a Boat Ride"
2015	A Gift Wrapped Christmas	Gwen	Television film
2016	Veep	Debralee	2 episodes
2016	My Christmas Love	Cynthia	Television film
2016–2022	Search Party	Portia Davenport	50 episodes
2017	Younger	Montana	5 episodes
2017	Odd Mom Out	Berkley	Episode: "Children in the Corn Pudding"
2017–2018	Strangers	Cam	17 episodes
2020	Dummy	Barbara (voice)	10 episodes
2020	Bob's Burgers	Madison (voice)	Episode: "A Fish Called Tina"
2021	Robot Chicken	Helga Pataki / Blonde Acapella Singer (voice)	Episode: "May Cause One Year of Orange Poop"
2021–2022	Disenchantment	Mora the Mermaid / Mop Girl (voice)	6 episodes, recurring role
2024	Bad Monkey	Eve	Main role
2024–2026	Shrinking	Sarah	2 episodes
2026	Mating Season	Macey	Episode: "The Dating Sites"
TBA	Seven Sisters †	TBA	Main role

=== Music video ===
Year	Title	Artist	Role
2017	"Rich White Girls"	Mansionz	Rich White Girl

== Awards and nominations ==
Year	Award	Category	Work	Result	Ref.
2009	Daytime Emmy Awards	Outstanding Younger Actress in a Drama Series	As the World Turns	Nominated	
