= Joe Pera =

American comedian (born 1988)

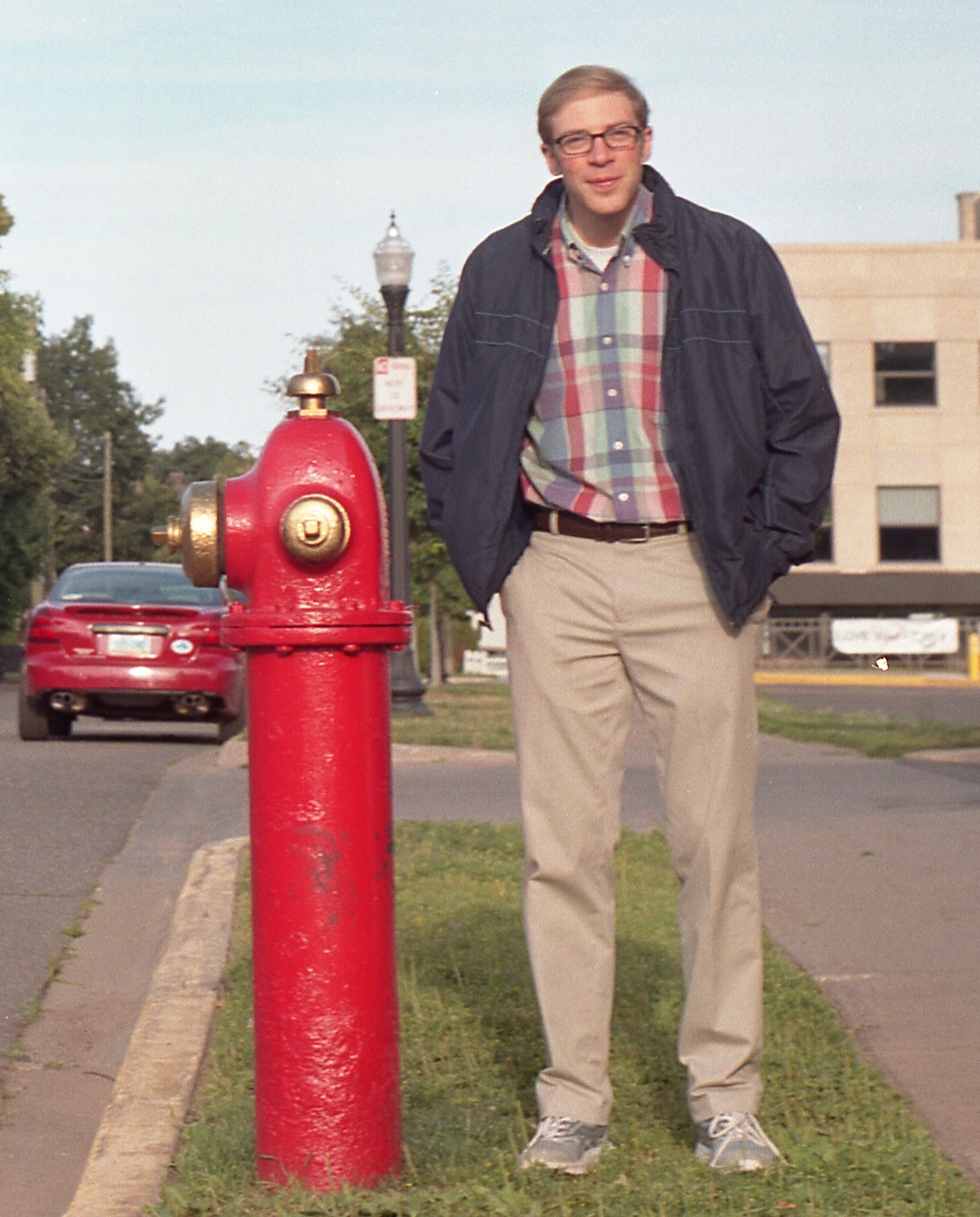
- Joe Pera in 2019
- Born: Joseph Pera; July 24, 1988 (age 38); Buffalo, New York, U.S.
- Education: Ithaca College
- Years active: 2009–present

Comedy career
- Medium: Stand-up; television; film
- Genres: Observational comedy; character comedy; sketch comedy
- Subjects: American culture; everyday life; pop culture; social awkwardness

Joseph Pera (born July 24, 1988) is an American comedian, writer, and actor. He is best known as the creator and star of Adult Swim's Joe Pera Talks with You, which entered development following the success of the 2016 special Joe Pera Talks You to Sleep, and ran for three seasons.

== Early life ==
Joe Pera was born in Buffalo, New York, and raised in the suburb of Amherst. Pera became interested in comedy from an early age, he has stated that his father and both sets of grandparents would joke around a lot and have had a large impact on his type of comedy. While he was in high school he and his friend would regularly write jokes, and they would burn CDs with their favorite stand-up bits. During his teenage years he took a comedy course taught by Saturday Night Live writer Alan Zweibel.

He studied film at Ithaca College, where he competed in and won the college's stand-up competition three times. Pera graduated from Ithaca College in 2010. He moved to New York City to pursue comedy and participated in open mic nights as often as possible.

== Career ==
Known for his slow, "grandfatherly" delivery and his penchant for wearing sweaters, Pera created the Adult Swim Infomercials Joe Pera Talks You to Sleep. This was followed by an appearance on Late Night with Seth Meyers, and another stand-alone Adult Swim special titled Joe Pera Helps You Find the Perfect Christmas Tree. Thanks to the success of those programs (all produced by Chestnut Walnut, founded by him and Conner O'Malley), Pera developed a television series for Adult Swim, which premiered on May 20, 2018, titled Joe Pera Talks with You. The show lasted for 3 seasons with Pera starring as a fictionalized version of himself, addressing the audience about seemingly mundane, everyday topics. In an interview Pera stated “Each episode is a quiet rumination on the beautiful mundanities of everyday life, I think part of the reason the show is so effective is that it tempers its kindness with brutal honesty.” The show has received critical acclaim, with much of the praise going towards the show's unique tone and writing. The A.V. Club's Erik Adams wrote that "It’s a particular type of funny, of the soft-spoken, deadpan, and disarming type that Pera practices onstage and on the talk-show circuit." On July 7, 2022, Pera announced that the show had been canceled. After the announcement many tributes were made in the show's honor, writing for Collider, Chase Hutchinson stated “Pera made something that was truly and brilliantly one-of-a-kind.”

He appeared on the talk show Conan on March 28, 2017, and on The Late Show with Stephen Colbert on December 4, 2019. In 2020 Adult Swim aired another special starting Pera titled Relaxing Old Footage With Joe Pera. That same year a 4-minute short Pera had written alongside Joe Bennett was released titled Birds in which Pera also provided the voices. In 2021, Joe Pera released a book named A Bathroom Book for People Not Pooping or Peeing but Using the Bathroom as an Escape, which was illustrated by Joe Bennett. Pera stated “It is exactly what its title suggests: a short read to occupy yourself with when you’re overwhelmed by everything on the other side of that bathroom door.”

On January 31, 2023, Joe and Chestnut Walnut announced a podcast to help people fall asleep called, Drifting Off With Joe Pera. It is similar to his Talks You To Sleep series. Episodes are released on the first Sunday of every month and feature a guest interview, a guest musician, and a philosophical monologue on a given topic. The podcast officially debuted in February and has gone on to receive critical acclaim. On March 3, 2023, Joe made a brief appearance on EHFM's Radio show No Dancing, where he discussed his thoughts on moving slowly and reflectively and shared a piece of music he was working on. He appears at 31:40. On October 6, 2023, Pera released a 56-minute standup special titled Joe Pera: Slow and Steady on YouTube.

In January 2025, the second season of Drifting Off With Joe Pera debuted. In April, Pera released the full audio from his live Drifting off with Joe Pera show at the Brooklyn Opera House on his YouTube channel. On July 8, 2025, Pera released a short film on his YouTube channel that he created alongside Carmen Christopher, titled DOING BUSINESS AT THE END OF THE WORLD.

On February 18, 2026, it was announced that Adult Swim had picked up a new series created by Pera and Dan Licata called My Two Cars.

== Comedic style ==
Pera is known to speak in a soft, measured, often quiet voice, pausing often. Pera avoids overt mean-spiritedness, with his humor instead coming from kindness, humility, from loving the world's small quirks. Pera makes the familiar feel strange or interesting by paying attention to little things. He is also known to mention his Buffalo upbringing.

His jokes often build slowly; parts are simple, not relying much on big punchlines, shock, or rapid fire jokes. The pacing gives him breathing room. His comedy has been described as cozy, "grandfatherly", comforting, and therapeutic. His show Joe Pera Talks with You was also credited with giving off the same cozy feeling by viewers.

Pera has stated during shows his personality is a little exaggerated, adding "but really I talk as myself from experience and about the things I'm interested in and the things that I find funny." His stage persona is somewhat unassuming, mild, nervous, and awkward in benign ways. GQ described his clothing style as "simple and practical, the uniform of an old man."

== Personal life ==
Pera is a lifelong Buffalo Bills fan. He has made dozens of posts on his Instagram showing his support for the team.

Pera also has a huge interest in tomatoes, posting numerous photos of tomatoes on his Instagram. In an interview, he stated, "Oh, I've been into tomatoes for years. It's a bit of a challenge when so many people bring me tomatoes after shows and I have to eat them whether I'm in the mood for a tomato or not. Because people are so kind about offering them. They aren't the easiest produce to transport so I try to eat them fresh when someone brings them. And, it is hard to turn down a good heirloom tomato."

In a video to his YouTube channel, Pera endorsed Democratic candidate India Walton for mayor of Buffalo, New York, in the 2021 election.

== Filmography ==
=== Film ===
| Year | Title | Role | Notes |
|---|---|---|---|
| 2016 | 5 Doctors | Davis | |
| 2017 | Snowy Bing Bongs Across the North Star Combat Zone | Jim | |
| 2023 | Elemental | Fern Grouchwood (voice) | |
| 2024 | Let's Start a Cult | Bo | |
| 2024 | Boys Go to Jupiter | Herschel Cretaceous (voice) | |
| 2026 | Never Change! | Group Member | |

=== Television ===
| Year | Title | Role | Notes |
|---|---|---|---|
| 2013–14 | The Chris Gethard Show | Zero Fucks Boyd | 4 episodes |
| 2014 | New Timers | Myron | 2 episodes |
| 2014 | Pancake Breakfast Critic with Joe Pera | Himself | 3 episodes; Produced with MTV Other |
| 2014 | Adam Devine's House Party | Himself | 1 episode |
| 2015 | The Special Without Brett Davis | Himself | 1 episode |
| 2016 | Infomercials | Himself | Episode: "Joe Pera Talks You To Sleep" |
| 2016 | Joe Pera Helps You Find the Perfect Christmas Tree | Himself | |
| 2016-2023 | Late Night with Seth Meyers | Himself | 7 episodes |
| 2017 | Conan | Himself | March 28 |
| 2017 | Crown Prince | Jim | Short: writer |
| 2017 | Snowy Bing Bongs Across the North Star Combat Zone | Jim | Short |
| 2018 | The George Lucas Talk Show | Himself | Episode LV: Post-SOLO Show-Lo |
| 2018–21 | Joe Pera Talks with You | Himself | 32 episodes; also creator, executive producer and writer |
| 2019 | The Late Show with Stephen Colbert | Himself | December 4 |
| 2020 | Relaxing Old Footage with Joe Pera | Himself | Special |
| 2020 | F Is for Family | Alaquippa Ed (voice) | 6 episodes |
| 2020 | Birds | All voices | Short: writer |
| 2022 | Search Party | Dr. Inane | Episode: "Song of Songs" |
| 2022–Present | Bob's Burgers | Christopher | Episode: "Ferry On My Wayward Bob and Linda" & "The Shell Game" |
| 2023 | Joe Pera: Slow and Steady | Himself | Comedy special |
| 2025 | Adventure Time: Fionna and Cake | Gordie | Episode: "The Butterfly and the River" |
| 2026 | Robot Chicken | Himself/Narrator | Television special, "Robot Chicken Adult Swim 25th Anniversary Special" |

=== YouTube series ===
| Year | Title | Role | Notes |
|---|---|---|---|
| 2014 | The Perfect Week | Himself | 7 episode mini-series hosted by JASH with trailer |
| 2014 | Pancake Breakfast Critic | Himself | 3 episode mini-series hosted by MTV |
| 2015 | How To Make It in USA | Himself | 9 episode mini-series co-starring Conner O'Malley |
| 2021 | Townsends | Himself | Appears in 7 episodes |
| 2023 | Stavvy's World | Himself | Episode 21: "Dan Licata and Joe Pera" |
| 2023 | Drifting Off with Joe Pera | Himself | mini-series with co-stars |
| TBA | Shrek 2 Retold | TBA | |

== Bibliography ==
| Year | Title |
|---|---|
| 2021 | A Bathroom Book for People Not Pooping or Peeing but Using the Bathroom as an Escape |
