= Lauren Servideo =

American comedian and actress (born 1991)

- Born: October 6, 1991 (age 35)
- Education: SUNY Albany
- Occupations: Comedian; actress

Instagram information
- Page: lauren servideo
- Years active: 2011–present
- Followers: 120,000
- Last updated: October 13, 2026

Lauren Servideo (born October 6, 1991) is an American comedian and actress. She became known for portraying various absurd characters in videos on Instagram.

== Early life ==
Servideo grew up in Albany, New York, the daughter of Donna and Tony Servideo, and has a younger sister. She began making "silly character videos" on the family computer. She graduated from SUNY Albany, majoring in journalism and minoring in women's studies.

== Career ==
Servideo moved to New York City to pursue a career in journalism, but got her first job as a medical publishing assistant. In 2013, when Instagram began supporting video, she began posting comedy videos there portraying various absurd characters. She was among the first social media users to post comedy shorts, and initially thinking just friends would watch them, she began to gain a following by 2018. She developed several signature characters, including Anubis, a basic centuries-old vampire from Los Angeles; Victoria, an always complaining woman from Pittsburgh; a Brandy Melville manager; and "Ethan's mom". (Note: Attributed to multiple references) In 2018, after five and a half years working in publishing, she was hired by Instagram as part of their Community Lab marketing team. She had almost 20,000 followers on the platform by then; she had more than 100,000 three years later.

Servideo appeared in two feature films in 2024, including Conner O'Malley's mockumentary Rap World as the ex-wife of O'Malley's character. In 2026, she appeared opposite Tom Gammill in his play A Morning With Ernie Bushmiller, playing multiple roles including Bushmiller's comic strip creation Nancy and Gammill himself.

== Filmography ==
=== Film ===
Year	Title	Role	Notes
2024	Rap World	Kelsey Atencio	
2024	Or Something	Thrift Store Girl	
2025	31 Candles	Maria	
2026	Little Brother	Rebecca "Chyna" O'Shaunnessy	
