= Max Miller (YouTuber) =

American YouTube historian (born 1983)

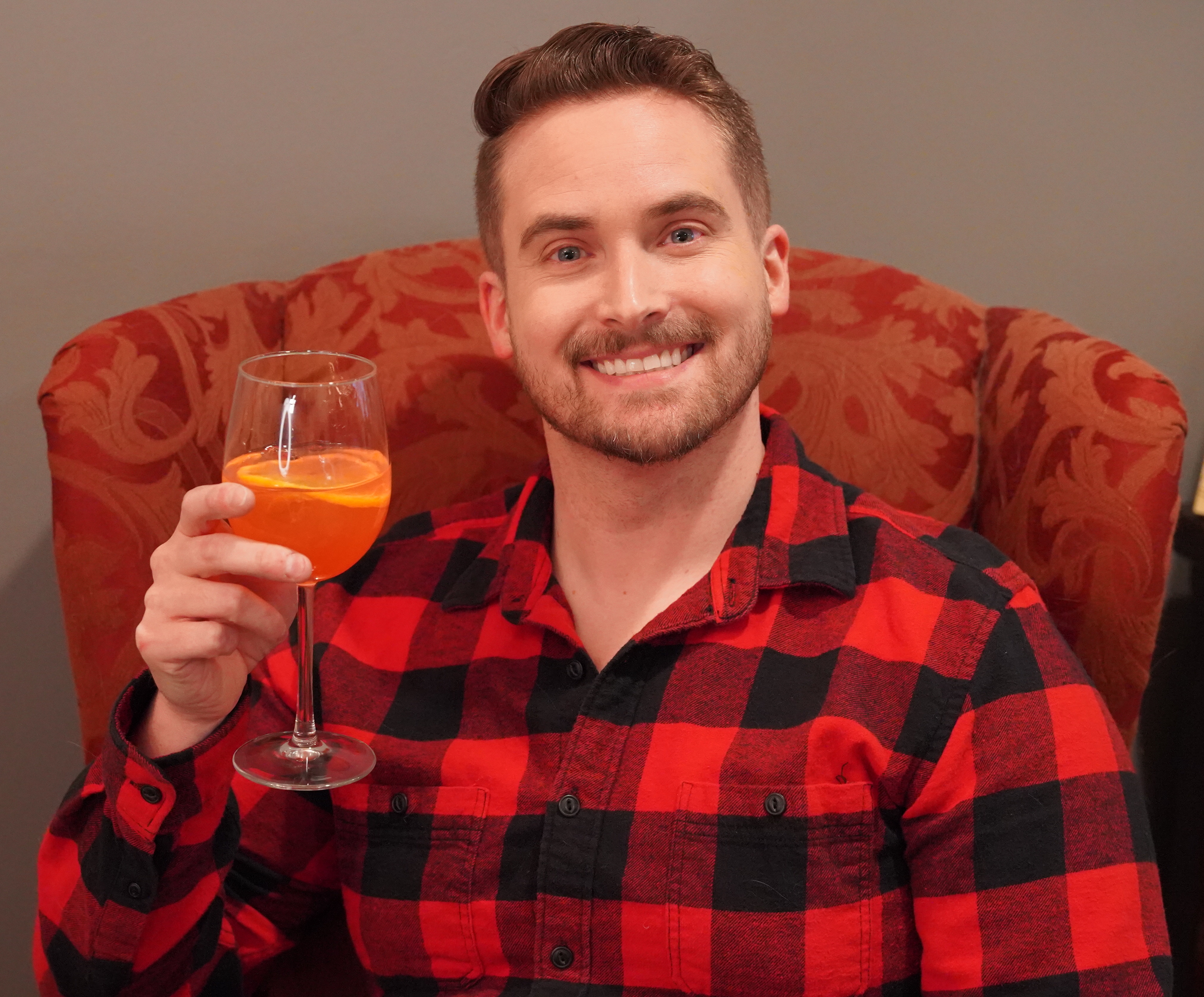
- Miller in 2020
- Born: March 30, 1983 (age 43); Phoenix, Arizona, U.S.
- Education: Arizona State University
- Spouse: Jose Mendoza (m. 2021)

YouTube information
- Channels: Tasting History with Max Miller; Ketchup with Max and Jose
- Years active: 2019–present
- Genres: Cooking; history
- Subscribers: 4.45 million
- Views: 963 million
- Last updated: April 12, 2026
- Website: Official website

Signature
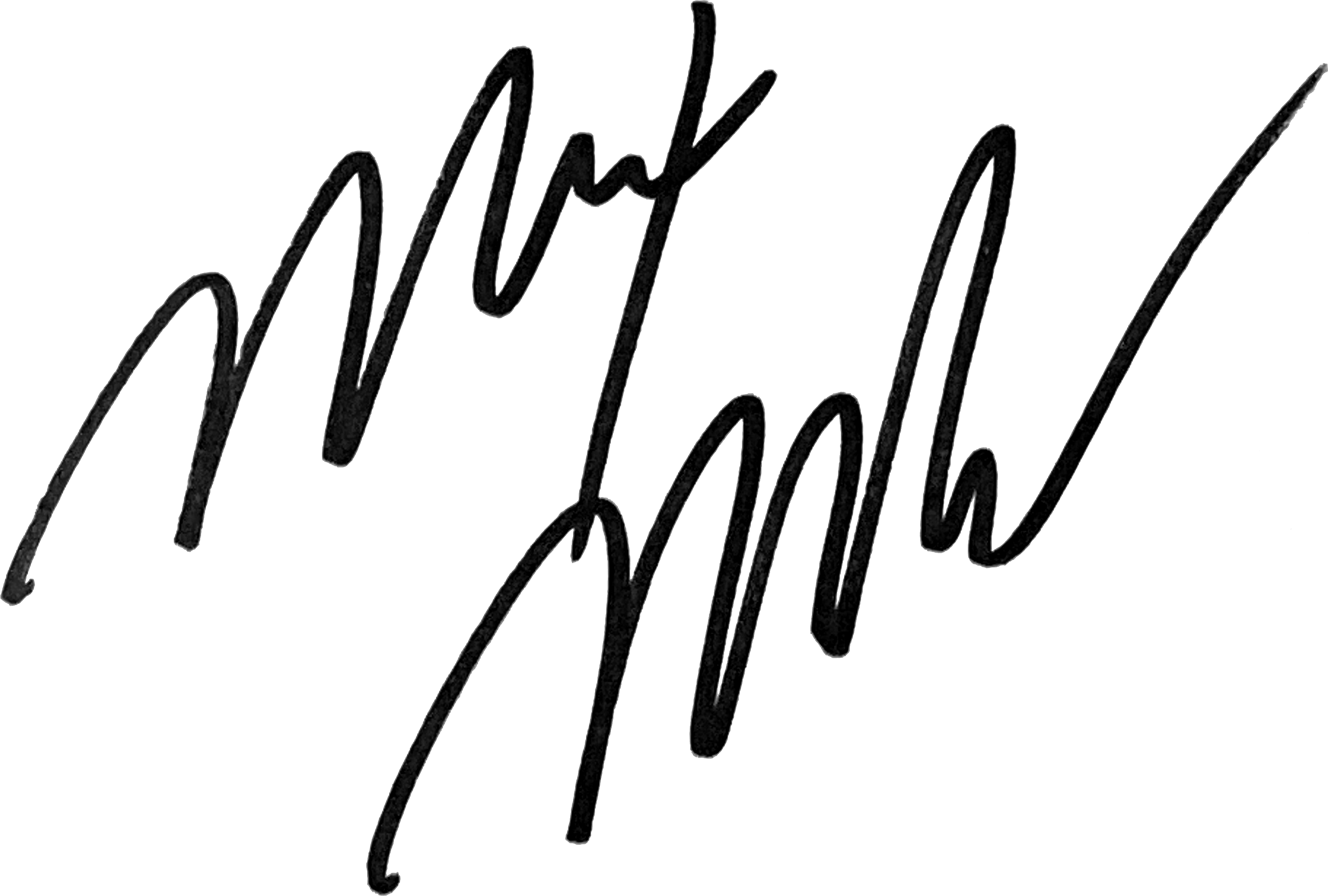

Max Miller (born March 30, 1983) is an American YouTuber and historian known for being the creator and host of Tasting History, a culinary and history fusion web-show that recreates ancient or historical recipes and explains the history around them.

== Early life ==
Miller was born on March 30, 1983 and grew up in Phoenix, Arizona. He had an interest in history, and, at six or seven, he started reading about Charles Cornwallis at the Siege of Yorktown that ended the American Revolutionary War in 1781, writing a report on it for fun.

He attended Arizona State University and earned a classical music degree, moving to New York City to train for Broadway theatre.

== Career ==
Miller moved from New York City to Los Angeles to pursue voice acting. He was hired at Walt Disney Studios in marketing before going into film distribution. In 2015, Miller and a friend went to Walt Disney World while on vacation, but the friend fell ill. As a result, they spent most of the time in a hotel, and the friend introduced Miller to The Great British Bake Off. Miller was not previously interested in cooking and had little experience with it, but was inspired by the show and its blend of history and baking. He then began cooking on his own, first baking a Battenberg cake.

Miller began to bring baked goods into the office, giving mini-lectures about the dish's history, and one of his coworkers suggested that he create videos on the topic. On December 23, 2019, he created the Tasting History channel.

In 2020, Miller was furloughed from Disney due to the COVID-19 pandemic, and started to spend time on the channel. He relegated himself to his upstairs as he did not want to get in the way of his fiancé, who was still working at Disney. He started producing videos and uploaded the first episode of Tasting History in February 2020, continuing to produce videos throughout the pandemic.

The recipes featured in Miller's videos are extensively researched. Where possible, Miller uses historical cookbooks but relies on other sources, such as newspapers and other written accounts, depending on the historical period and location each recipe originates from. Miller stresses that he is not a historian, and has more freedom to focus on the stories of foods, rather than academic history. While some recipes he has only made for the show, other historical recipes he has included in his regular cooking repertoire; he believes that part of the fun of the channel is that viewers can decide what to try making for themselves.

Tasting History reached 500,000 subscribers on YouTube in January 2021. When Disney contacted him to resume his job in April 2021, he decided to quit instead, and focus on the YouTube channel.

In February 2021, Simon & Schuster announced that they would be publishing a cookbook by Miller. The book, Tasting History: Explore the Past Through 4,000 Years of Recipes, released April 2023 and appeared on The New York Times and Publishers Weekly bestseller lists.

In 2024, Miller began co-hosting the Roku Channel cooking show Clash of the Cookbooks alongside Phoebe Robinson. The television series follows contestants competing to cook dishes from various historical cookbooks.

== Personal life ==
Miller is gay, and he married his longtime fiancé Jose Mendoza in October 2021.

== See also ==
- Townsends, another channel focused on historical recipes
