= Rap World =

2024 film by Conner O'Malley and Danny Scharar

- Release poster
- Directed by: Conner O'Malley; Danny Scharar
- Written by: Conner O'Malley; Jack Bensinger; Eric Rahill
- Produced by: Harris Mayersohn; Meryl Faye Crock
- Starring: Conner O'Malley; Jack Bensinger; Eric Rahill
- Edited by: Jack Bensinger
- Music by: Mikal Cronin
- Production company: Dogma 3000
- Release dates: April 7, 2024 (LAFM); October 24, 2024 (VOD)
- Running time: 56 minutes
- Country: United States
- Language: English

Rap World is a 2024 American mockumentary film written and directed by Conner O'Malley and Danny Scharar. Starring O'Malley, Jack Bensinger, and Eric Rahill. The film is set in 2009 in suburban Pennsylvania and focuses on three friends attempting to record an amateur hip-hop album in one night. Harris Mayersohn and Meryl Faye Crock produced it through the company Dogma 3000.

Rap World premiered on April 7, 2024, at the Los Angeles Festival of Movies. It was released digitally on YouTube on October 24, 2024.

== Plot ==
In 2009, two friends — Matt and Casey — working at a movie theater in suburban Tobyhanna, Pennsylvania, plan to record a rap album in one night and decide to make a home movie documenting the process, directed by their friend Ben. After leaving work, the group stops to order food from a McDonald's drive-through. Casey pranks Matt by asking him to order "mystic sauce" for a fourth friend, Jason, much to the ire of an embarrassed Matt.

The trio then goes to Casey's mother's house to use as a studio while she is out of town for cosmetic ear surgery. Matt says he did not expect Jason to be present at the recording session and tells him he doesn't want him involved with the album. During a subsequent preparation session, Jason plays an instrumental track he produced, which Casey and Matt approve of. Matt apologizes to Jason and invites him to join the project, forming a rap group known as the Coolbaugh Crew.

Casey retrieves a pistol from his mother's room and the group uses it as a prop for promotional images. They put off the recording session and procrastinate by smoking marijuana. Jason records a video message for Kiera, a woman he is attempting to court.

After technical difficulties hamper the Coolbaugh Crew's first attempt to record, they visit Casey's cousin, Serj, in search of more marijuana. Serj's mother yells at him for inviting friends over instead of taking time to care for his grandmother. The trio leaves and drives Matt's sister home from work.

The group makes minimal progress on a second recording attempt before going to a grocery store to buy snacks. From there, they decide to attend a local house party where Kiera is present. Jason offers Kiera a ring while asking to date her; Kiera confuses this for a marriage proposal and laughs at him. Matt, who had told his ex-wife he couldn't watch their kids due to his recording obligations, is confronted by his ex-wife's sister for being at the party instead. The party devolves into a verbal fight between several attendees, and Jason breaks off his courtship of Kiera.

Back at home, Jason attempts to boost the spirits of a dejected Matt and Casey. Kelsey, Matt's ex-wife, arrives to confront him about his party-going. After arguing, they try to have sex, but Matt is unable to stimulate an erection. Hours later, the group begins recording and eventually finishes the album in the early morning hours of the next day.

Casey suggests recording the sound of a gunshot to be included on the album. The group goes out into the woods to record it, where Jason accidentally shoots Matt in the leg. Although Matt is in good spirits after being shot, he dies from the bullet wound he sustained in his femoral artery. At the funeral, Matt's sister begins to argue with his ex-wife during her eulogy and his friends provide awkward tributes to him. The film ends with a sample of the album set to a montage of home movie footage, as well as text explaining what happened to the friends and their families after the events of the film.

== Cast ==
- Conner O'Malley as Matt Lohan, a rapper for the amateur group Coolbaugh Crew
- Jack Bensinger as Casey Foy, a rapper for Coolbaugh Crew
- Eric Rahill as Jason Rice, the producer for Coolbaugh Crew
- Danny Scharar as Ben Kupec
- Dan Licata as Serj Lopecia, Casey's cousin
- Edy Modica as Matt's sister
- Sarah Sherman as Sports Authority employee who flirts with Casey.
- Nate Varrone as Riley Byro, a house party host
- Ruby McCollister as Kiera English, Jason's romantic interest
- Rachel Kaly as Alecia Atencio, Kelsey's sister
- Lauren Servideo as Kelsey Atencio, Matt's ex-wife
- Richard Kent Green as a priest
- Rajat Suresh, Jeremy Levick, Cameron Fetter, Caleb Pitts & Patrick Doran as party attendees

== Production ==
During the COVID-19 pandemic, co-writer Conner O'Malley and cast member Jack Bensinger conceived the idea for the film based on old footage of teenagers playing Guitar Hero they found on a DV camera O'Malley purchased in 2018 for his short film Teens Save the Mall. Bensinger stated that various forms of battle rap media such as 8 Mile, the Scribble Jam festival, and the King of the Dot league inspired the decision to make a movie about white rappers.

Production began in October 2020. The team originally planned to film the content, set in 2003, over one weekend and upload it in thirty-second segments to YouTube with default serialized file names "like 'JPEG_98764'". After initial dissatisfaction with the footage, the project was shelved for six months. Bensinger later edited the footage into a ten-minute short, which inspired the production team to turn the concept into a feature film. After a new script was written, "piecemealed" filming took place on weekends over two to three years. Filming wrapped with over 70 hours of footage, which Bensinger edited.

Alternative rock musician Mikal Cronin provided the music for the film. Some of the songs performed by the rappers in the movie were written by the actors on-set. O'Malley stated that his character's lyricism is based on themes of political hip-hop and conspiracy theories:

My character is really into Immortal Technique and really wants to kind of have conscious conspiratorial raps. “They're gonna put barcodes on everybody's necks”-type conspiracies. That was quite easy to tap into.

Some of the lyrics performed by Bensinger in the movie were free-styled.

== Release ==
Rap World was distributed independently, making its world premiere at the Eagle Theatre in Los Angeles on April 7, 2024, as the closing film of the Los Angeles Festival of Movies. The film was not released theatrically, instead going direct to digital on YouTube.
