= Peel Dream Magazine =

American indie rock band

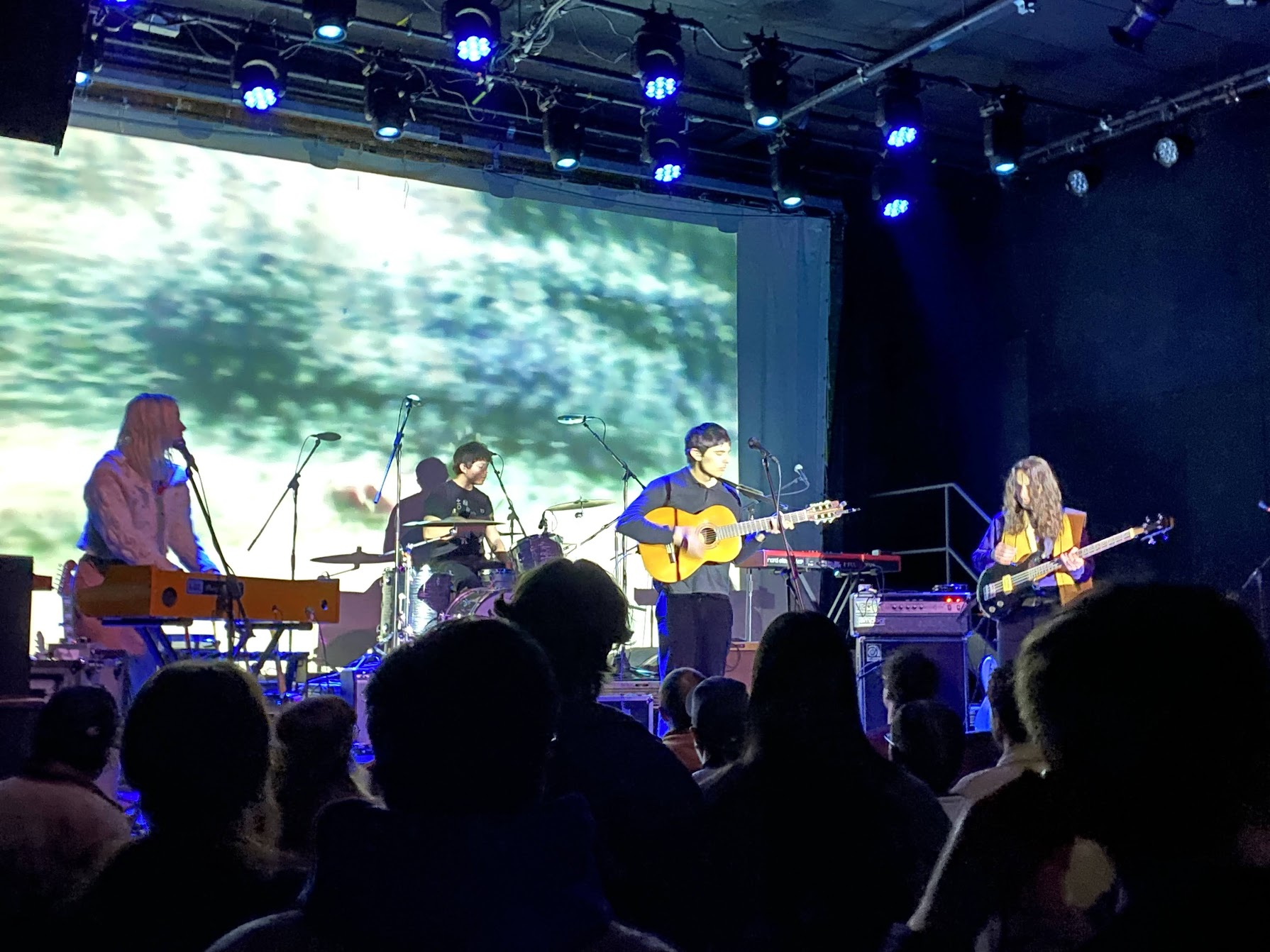
Peel Dream Magazine in 2025

Peel Dream Magazine is an American indie rock band from Los Angeles fronted by Joe Stevens.

Peel Dream Magazine released their first album in 2019 titled Modern Meta Psychic on Slumberland Records. The group released their second album in April 2020, titled Agitprop Alterna, also through Slumberland Records. That June, Stevens released a new EP titled Moral Panics. In 2022, the group released a new song titled "Pad", from their then upcoming album of the same name. The group released their fourth album in 2024 titled Rose Main Reading Room through Topshelf Records.

Stevens is also a composer, having scored the film Let's Start a Cult.

== Discography ==
Studio albums

- Modern Meta Physic (2018, Slumberland Records)
- Agitprop Alterna (2020, Slumberland Records)
- Pad (2022, Tough Love Records)
- Rose Main Reading Room (2024, Topshelf Records)
- Taurus (2025, Topshelf Records)

EPs

- Up and Up (2019, Slumberland Records)
- Moral Panics (2020, Slumberland Records)
- Magic Is Pocketed (2023)
