= Los Angeles Festival of Movies =

Annual film festival in Los Angeles

- Location: Los Angeles, California, U.S.
- Founded: April 4, 2024; 2 years ago
- Artistic director: Micah Gottlieb

The Los Angeles Festival of Movies (LAFM) is an annual independent film festival in Los Angeles, California, operating on a format of feature films and short films. Sarah Winshall and Micah Gottlieb co-founded the festival in 2024.

== History ==
The LA Film Festival (LAFF) previously operated as the city's independent film festival from 1995 to 2018, hosting in various venues. Six years after the discontinuation of LAFF, producer Sarah Winshall and film non-profit executive Micah Gottlieb co-founded the Los Angeles Festival of Movies. The new organization signed on Gottlieb's company, Mezzanine, as well as streaming service Mubi as sponsors.

The first edition of the Los Angeles Festival of Movies took place from April 4 to April 7, 2024, in three independent venues: Vidiots in Eagle Rock, 2220 Arts + Archives in Historic Filipinotown, and Now Instant Image Hall in Chinatown. Its opening night film was I Saw the TV Glow, which had previously premiered at that year's edition of the Sundance Film Festival. Rap World had its world premiere at the inaugural event as the festival's closing night film.
