= Eric Rahill =

American comedy writer and actor (born 1993)

- Born: July 16, 1993 (age 33); Edmonds, Washington, U.S.
- Occupations: Comedian; writer; actor
- Writing career
- Notable works: Joy Tactics (2023–present); Rap World (2024); The Paper (2025–present)

Eric Rahill (born July 16, 1993) is an American comedian, writer, and actor. Rahill is one of the core writers and recurring characters on The Paper, the spinoff series for The Office. He also appeared in Rap World and Friendship, along with acting in I Think You Should Leave. He co-hosts the Joy Tactics podcast with Jack Bensinger and Nate Varrone.

== Early life ==
Rahill was born and raised in Edmonds, Washington, in an Evangelical Christian household. After deciding to pursue standup comedy, Rahill worked for Chicago's Second City on a cruise ship.

== Career ==
After a career of standup and mainly comedic acting roles, Rahill co-wrote and starred in Rap World, a feature-film collaboration between Rahill and fellow comedians Conner O'Malley and Jack Bensinger, which was filmed on weekends for two to three years, resulting in over 70 hours of footage, and appeared in the A24 film Friendship. On The Paper, Rahill plays Travis Bienlien, a Softees employee and part-time reporter for the titular paper, and was given sole writing credit on episode six, titled "Churnalism." Most recently, he appeared in the 2026 film Primetime and as Maddie's husband Jake in Maddie's Secret.

On the podcast Joy Tactics, Rahill and fellow comedians Jack Bensinger and Nate Varrone play "heightened" versions of themselves while trying to stay on one topic per episode.

== Personal life ==
Rahill is a former Christian who used to pray every night but came to feel "sour and bitter" about certain aspects of the religion, including the Rapture. The 2023 short film Seth's Prayer (directed by Rap World director Danny Scharar and written by and starring Rahill) explores his former Christian faith in a comedic way.

== Filmography ==
=== Film ===
Year	Title	Role	Notes
2024	Rap World	Jason Rice	Also writer
2024	Friendship	Mike	
2024	Let's Start a Cult	Tyler	
2025	Maddie's Secret	Jake	
2026	Wishful Thinking	Milo	
2026	Primetime	Troy	

=== Television ===
Year	Title	Role	Notes
2020	Chris Gethard Presents	Eric	
2022	Dicktown	voice	Episode: “The Mystery of Dr. Marjorie Frost”
2023	I Think You Should Leave with Tim Robinson		
2023	The Bear	Partygoer #2	Episode: "Pop"
2025-present	The Paper	Travis Bienlien	20 episodes
2026	Make That Movie	Bert Eblen Archer	Episode: "Naughty Naughty Secrets"
