= Maddie's Secret =

2025 film by John Early

- Theatrical release poster
- Directed by: John Early
- Written by: John Early
- Produced by: Harris Mayersohn; Luca Intili; John Early
- Starring: John Early; Kate Berlant; Eric Rahill; Claudia O'Doherty; Conner O'Malley; Vanessa Bayer; Pat Regan; Dominique Witten; Emily Allan; Leah Hennessey; Ruby McCollister; Chris Bauer; Kristen Johnston
- Cinematography: Max Lakner
- Edited by: Danny Scharar
- Music by: Michael A. Hesslein
- Production companies: Dogma 3000; Unapologetic Projects; Dweck Productions; Whetstone Pictures; Radish Films
- Distributed by: Magnolia Pictures
- Release dates: September 4, 2025 (TIFF); June 19, 2026 (United States)
- Running time: 101 minutes
- Country: United States
- Language: English
- Box office: $1.2 million

Maddie's Secret is a 2025 American satirical comedy-drama film produced, written, and directed by John Early in his directorial debut. It stars Early, Kate Berlant, Eric Rahill, Claudia O'Doherty, Conner O'Malley, Vanessa Bayer, Pat Regan, Dominique Witten, Emily Allan, Leah Hennessey, Ruby McCollister, Chris Bauer, and Kristen Johnston.

The film premiered at the Toronto International Film Festival on September 4, 2025. The title is a reference to the 1986 television film Kate's Secret.

== Plot ==
Madison "Maddie" Ralph works as a dishwasher at Gourmaybe, a Los Angeles test kitchen that produces short-form content, though she dreams of becoming a chef. One evening, Maddie's husband Jake films her preparing one of her vegetarian recipes and posts it on TikTok, where it goes viral overnight. Though angry about the breach of her contract with Gourmaybe, Maddie's lecherous boss Zack promotes her to an on-camera personality, and she quickly becomes a sensation.

Maddie's newfound success, while initially thrilling, quickly begins to exacerbate her insecurities about her body. She overhears hurtful comments from online viewers and arrogant Gourmaybe chef Emily, and receives direct insults from her estranged mother Beverlee. Pressure mounts when producers of the popular food-based television drama The Boar (a parody of the TV series The Bear) visit Gourmaybe, trying to decide between Maddie and Emily to serve as a culinary consultant for their upcoming sixth season. Maddie suffers a relapse of her dormant bulimia nervosa, which she attempts to hide from her loved ones. When Jake discovers her hunched over the toilet after purging, she lies that she is pregnant.

Maddie's best friend Deena Michaels attempts to help her, spending a weekend cooking with her and taking her to a body-inclusive dance class, but Maddie's bulimia worsens despite these efforts. Deena eventually begins to resent Maddie for ostensibly neglecting their friendship as her fame grows. After overexerting herself at one class, Maddie suffers cardiac arrest and is taken to the hospital. Dr. Kronenfield, a specialist in eating disorders, recommends that she check into an inpatient treatment program. Although she needs to prepare a meal for the producers of The Boar in two weeks, Maddie agrees, and confides in Jake about her bulimia.

At the program, Maddie is roomed with Julie, a sweet but childish woman who is under strict orders not to exercise, and feuds with cynical fellow patients Brittany, Connie, and Amanda. Deena checks herself into the facility, having convincingly feigned bulimia, and helps Maddie escape in time for her dinner with The Boar producers. Aghast that Maddie is breaking the rules, Julie begins doing aerobic exercises on her bed as Maddie leaves.

At the dinner, Maddie is revolted by the sight of people eating, and becomes further stressed when she accidentally ruins one of her dishes by leaving the mixer running too long. She runs upstairs to purge, and a producer discovers her unconscious on the bathroom floor, having vomited up blood. Maddie returns to the hospital, where a doctor tells Jake that Maddie has experienced a gastrointestinal rupture, and reveals she has never been pregnant. Maddie is readmitted to the facility. Upon arrival, Maddie learns that Julie died of heart failure, for which Maddie blames herself. Deena becomes Maddie's new roommate, but Maddie is disturbed by Deena's insensitive comments about Julie, and by her violent reaction after Maddie calls her out.

Maddie honors Julie's memory in a private ceremony with Brittany, Connie, and Amanda, during which she admits that her tumultuous relationship with her own mother prevented her from wanting children, but that Julie awakened protective, maternal feelings in her. Maddie tells Kronenfield that she is ready to confront Beverlee, who arrives for a session. Maddie relays how, in her childhood, Beverlee would project her own insecurities onto Maddie, forcing her to eat nothing but meat as part of the Atkins diet and encouraging her to purge when she was being bullied by schoolmates over her body. Maddie then tearfully describes Beverlee bringing her to bars, where older men would sexually harass Maddie before Beverlee took them into the bathroom to "finish them off". Beverlee is unrepentant, mocking and belittling Maddie and Kronenfield before storming out.

After preparing a vegetarian meal for her fellow patients, Maddie leaves the facility, while Deena is transferred into the mental health clinic for her violent behavior. Emily, who has taken The Boar job, visits Maddie at home to make amends with her and admits that her hostility toward Maddie stemmed from jealousy. Maddie tries to talk to Jake, but he is still upset with her for faking her pregnancy. Uncertain of her future, Maddie goes for a run with a smile on her face.

== Cast ==
- John Early as Maddie Ralph
- Kate Berlant as Deena Michaels
- Eric Rahill as Jake
- Claudia O'Doherty as Emily
- Conner O'Malley as Zach
- Vanessa Bayer as Julie
- Pat Regan as Nurse Kelly
- Dominique Witten as Nurse Hammond
- Nate Varrone as Dan
- Mariah Robinson as Chelsea
- Emily Allan as Amanda
- Leah Hennessey as Connie
- Ruby McCollister as Brittany
- Chris Bauer as Dr. Kronenfield
- Kristen Johnston as Beverlee Ralph
- Frankie Quiñones as security guard
- Merrick McCartha as doctor

== Production ==
Early began developing the film in 2024, inspired by the John Waters film Female Trouble (1974).

Principal photography took place in February 2025, with production being kept under wraps. The film was shot at Early's home in Silver Lake, Los Angeles.

== Release ==
Maddie's Secret premiered at the Toronto International Film Festival on September 4, 2025. In October 2025, Magnolia Pictures acquired distribution rights to the film, and it was released on June 19, 2026.

== Reception ==
=== Critical response ===
On review aggregator website Rotten Tomatoes, the film holds an approval rating of 85% based on 89 reviews, with an average rating of 7/10. The website's consensus reads: "Equal parts exuberant crowd-pleaser and intimate passion project, Maddie's Secret embraces melodrama without irony, finding emotional depth in its vibrant style and unwavering commitment to its singular vision." Metacritic, which uses a weighted average, assigned the film a score of 74 out of 100, based on 17 critics, indicating "generally favorable" reviews.

A short excerpt of a dance class sequence in the film, choreographed by Danielle Polanco, became a widely circulated viral GIF.

=== Accolades ===
Award	Date of ceremony	Category	Nominee(s)	Result	Ref.
Gotham Independent Film Awards	November 30, 2026	Breakthrough Director	John Early	Pending	
Gotham Independent Film Awards	November 30, 2026	Outstanding Lead Performance	John Early	Pending	
