= Amita Rao =

American comedian and actress

- Born: September 9, 1998 (age 28)
- Education: Virginia Commonwealth University School of the Arts
- Occupations: Comedian; actress; writer
- Years active: 2020–present

Amita Rao (born September 9, 1998) is an American comedian, actress, and writer.

== Early life and education ==
Rao grew up in Centreville, Virginia. She attended Virginia Tech and transferred to Virginia Commonwealth University School of the Arts (VCU).

At VCU, she met Chelsea Matkins. Matkins had co-founded Gag Reflex, a sketch comedy and improv group, with two other students the year before Rao started attending VCU. Matkins brought Rao on to keep Gag Reflex going after existing members graduated and moved away. The duo participated in several improv groups in addition to Gag Reflex at VCU, including Running AMok, Blue Collard Greens, and Toxic Shock. They also lived together in Richmond, Virginia, during the COVID-19 pandemic.

Rao graduated in 2020 with a degree in theater performance and English. Between January and May 2021, she worked as a development intern at Queen City Comedy in New York.

== Career ==
In 2020, while living together in Richmond, Rao and Matkins started filming short-form situational comedy videos for TikTok. These videos featured various characters engaged in relatable, everyday conversations, resulting in paid content partnerships with brands like Target and Tinder.

In November 2021, while continuing to post on TikTok, the duo moved to Chicago, Illinois, and attended the Annoyance Theatre tryouts for House Improv teams. A few months later, they were booked to perform Gag Reflex as a solo act at the Annoyance; the show sold out. Annoyance's founder-director, Mick Napier, and producer, Jennifer Estlin, invited representatives from talent agency Grossman & Jack to their next show, and they later signed both Rao and Matkins. Gag Reflex became a regular fixture at the Annoyance and was performed at other Chicago venues.

Rao was selected for the 2022 NBCUniversal/The Second City Bob Curry Fellowship, allowing her to train at and tour with The Second City. The same year, she showcased for Saturday Night Live twice.

In early-2024, Rao was booked for a minor appearance in The Emperor of Ocean Park. In 2025, Rao played recurring roles in two comedy series: Nandika in Hulu's Deli Boys and Issa in FX's Adults. Time called Issa "loud, dramatic [and] sexually liberated" and "unapologetically brash".

In August 2025, Rao joined the cast of Wishful Thinking, a film starring Lewis Pullman and Maya Hawke. She voiced Harper for High on Life 2 (2026).

== Personal life ==
In 2025, Rao moved from Chicago to Brooklyn Heights.

== Filmography ==
=== Television ===
Year	Title	Role	Notes
2024	The Emperor of Ocean Park	Receptionist	Episode: "Chapter One"
2025–2026	Adults	Issa	Main Role
2025–2026	Deli Boys	Nandika	6 episodes
2026	Wishful Thinking	Ella	
