= The Paper (2025 TV series) =

American mockumentary sitcom series

- Promotional poster
- Genre: Mockumentary; Sitcom; Workplace comedy; Comedy verite
- Created by: Greg Daniels; Michael Koman
- Based on: The Office by: Ricky Gervais; Stephen Merchant
- Starring: Domhnall Gleeson; Sabrina Impacciatore; Chelsea Frei; Melvin Gregg; Gbemisola Ikumelo; Alex Edelman; Ramona Young; Tim Key; Oscar Nunez; Eric Rahill; Duane Shepard Sr.
- Country of origin: United States
- Original language: English
- No. of seasons: 2
- No. of episodes: 20

Production
- Executive producers: Greg Daniels; Michael Koman; Howard Klein; Ben Silverman; Ricky Gervais; Stephen Merchant
- Producer: Matthew Nodella
- Cinematography: Rick Page; DJ Stipsen; Chloe Weaver
- Editor: David Rogers
- Camera setup: Single-camera
- Running time: 26–32 minutes
- Production companies: Deedle-Dee Productions; Banijay Americas; Universal Television

Original release
- Network: Peacock
- Release: September 4, 2025 – present

Related
- The Office

The Paper is an American mockumentary sitcom television series created by Greg Daniels and Michael Koman. The series is a follow-up to and spinoff of the American mockumentary series The Office which originally ran on NBC from 2005 to 2013. The series stars Domhnall Gleeson and Sabrina Impacciatore, alongside Chelsea Frei, Melvin Gregg, Gbemisola Ikumelo, Alex Edelman, Ramona Young, Tim Key, Eric Rahill, and Duane Shepard Jr., with Oscar Nunez reprising his role from The Office. In Toledo, Ohio, the same documentary crew that followed the workers at Dunder Mifflin's Scranton, Pennsylvania branch twenty years earlier focuses its efforts on the Toledo Truth Teller, a historic but declining Midwestern newspaper trying to resurrect itself with volunteer reporters.

The Paper premiered on Peacock on September 4, 2025, with its ten-episode first season. In September 2025, ahead of the series premiere, the series was renewed for a second season which premiered on September 9, 2026.

== Cast ==
=== Main ===
- Domhnall Gleeson as Ned Sampson, the new editor-in-chief of the Toledo Truth Teller; he is a former Softees toilet paper salesman and hopes to return the Truth Teller to its former glory.
- Sabrina Impacciatore as Esmeralda Grand, the brash managing editor of Toledo Truth Teller and TTT Online who is resistant to Ned's plans, as she is content to fill the paper with wire articles and clickbait.
- Chelsea Frei as Mare Pritti, the paper's compositor; she is a former war correspondent of the US Army who wrote for Stars and Stripes and is excited to work as a reporter again under Ned.
- Melvin Gregg as Detrick Moore, the people-pleasing advertising sales rep for the paper; he is romantically interested in Nicole.
- Gbemisola Ikumelo as Adelola Olofin, an accountant working under Oscar who is often wary of the antics of her coworkers.
- Alex Edelman as Adam Cooper, a socially awkward, sheltered accountant on Oscar's team. He has four young children, as his wife does not believe in using contraception.
- Ramona Young as Nicole Lee, the circulation department staffer; she is Mare's best friend and frequently at odds with Esmeralda, who treats her as a personal assistant.
- Tim Key as Ken Davies, Enervate's corporate strategist. Ken is bumbling and overbearing, often teaming up with Esmeralda to work against Ned.
- Oscar Nunez as Oscar Martinez, an accountant who previously worked at the Scranton, Pennsylvania branch of Dunder Mifflin. Nunez reprises his role from The Office. He is the head accountant in the Enervate office shared by the Toledo Truth Teller and the Toledo branch of Softees, a toilet paper brand. He is resistant to the documentary team's presence after his experience at Dunder Mifflin.
- Eric Rahill as Travis Bienlien (season 2; recurring season 1), a Softees worker and part-time reporter for the paper.
- Duane Shepard Sr. as Barry (season 2; recurring season 1), a longtime journalist and the paper's sole remaining full-time reporter. He is somewhat senile and often unaware of what is going on around him.

=== Recurring ===
- Allan Havey as Marv Putnam, CEO of Enervate; he is open to Ned's ideas for the paper as long as they do not lose the company money.
- Nate Jackson as Nate Wells, a janitor at Truth Teller Tower
- Mo Welch as Kimberly, a sales rep for Softees who is friends with Mare
- Nancy Lenehan as Ann Putnam, Marv's assistant and sister-in-law
- Molly Ephraim as Summer, Adam's overbearing and religious wife with whom he has four children
- Tracy Letts as John Stack (season 1), a former Editor-In-Chief from the 1970s
- Zak Messinger as Matteo, Esmeralda's son
- Matt Braunger as Dan, an editor at the Cincinnati Chronicle
- Lisa Gilroy as Lisa (season 2), a human resources representative at the Toledo Truth Teller
- Jon Lovitz as Todd Dumph (season 2), one of Mare's co-workers at the Cincinnati Chronicle
- Toks Olagundoye as Jeanie Lever (season 2), one of Mare's co-workers at the Cincinnati Chronicle

=== Guest ===
- Robert R. Shafer as Bob Vance, reprising his role from The Office (season 1)
- Josh Holloway as himself (season 1)
- Matt Peters as Gary (season 1)
- Tawny Newsome as Harper Brewster (season 1)
- Michael Hitchcock as Mr. K (season 1)
- Linda Park as a television commercial casting director (season 1)
- Chris Witaske as Theo (season 1)
- Sam Huntington as Chris (season 2)
- Andy Richter as Carl (season 2)
- Terry Gross as herself (season 2)

== Episodes ==
| Season | Episodes | Originally released |
|---|---|---|
| 1 | 10 | September 4, 2025 |
| 2 | 10 | September 9, 2026 |

=== Season 1 (2025) ===
| No. overall | No. in season | Title | Directed by | Written by | Original release date |
|---|---|---|---|---|---|
| 1 | 1 | "Pilot" | Greg Daniels | Greg Daniels & Michael Koman | September 4, 2025 |
In Scranton, Pennsylvania, Bob Vance of Vance Refrigeration explains how Dunder Mifflin has gone out of business and its trademark was sold in 2019 to Enervate, a company that manufactures paper products such as office supplies and Softees toilet paper. Enervate owns the Toledo Truth Teller, an Ohio newspaper where Ned Sampson is about to start his first shift as Editor in Chief, much to the dismay of Managing Editor Esmeralda Grand. Accountant Oscar Martinez, a former employee of Dunder Mifflin who now works at Enervate, is displeased at being filmed while working at his job again. Ned hopes to return the paper to its former glory, as it has become an online newsletter full of clickbait and Associated Press articles under Esmeralda, who is content to keep things as they are. Ned bonds with Mare Pritti, a disillusioned Army veteran who works as the paper's compositor. Despite resistance from Esmeralda and Ken Davies, Enervate's corporate strategist, Ned convinces the Truth Teller staff and various other Enervate employees to volunteer as reporters to help rebuild the paper.
| 2 | 2 | "The Five W's" | Ken Kwapis | Greg Daniels & Michael Koman | September 4, 2025 |
The team scrambles to publish their first issue after Esmeralda spitefully cancels the wire service. Ned sends his newly minted reporters into Toledo to dig up stories while he desperately calls the police, morgue, and other emergency services for leads. Mare and Barry head to cover a water main break, but Barry immediately trips over a broken crate and is hospitalized. Adelola and Adam interview some teenagers at the dog park, who tell them about a new trend called "dogging" in which people act like dogs in public; the two do not realize they are being pranked and write a genuine article that is unusable. Travis has a lead about changes in fishing law, but Detrick realizes that the lead was a ruse for Travis to confront his ex-girlfriend and her new partner at the Fish and Wildlife office, resulting in Travis getting arrested. Ned receives a promising tip about a potential murderer on the loose, but is dismayed to find that his earlier frantic phone calls to the morgue are what the police are investigating. In the end, Ned publishes a hopeful letter from the editor and a sudoku puzzle submitted by Oscar. Oscar excitedly sends a photo of the puzzle to Stanley Hudson, asking him for his opinion.
| 3 | 3 | "Buddy and the Dude" | Yana Gorskaya | Patrick Kang & Michael Levin | September 4, 2025 |
Esmeralda, resentful that Ned is still around, tells him that Mare is quitting to work at the Radisson. She also senses Ned's attraction to Mare and lies that she is asexual and would not be interested in him. Ned decides to go with Mare to write an exposé on the shady business practices of local mattress stores, convinced she will stay at the Truth Teller if the piece is a success. The two pose as a couple shopping for a new mattress, but Ned's awkward and nervous demeanor threatens to blow their cover. While the saleswoman is distracted, Ned calls the mattress supplier and uncovers proof that the companies are deliberately misleading customers. Mare and Ned celebrate the success of the article and Mare decides not to take the other job. Meanwhile, Esmeralda purposefully does not tell Ned about a budget meeting so that he will look bad in front of Ken and Marv. She and Ken lobby to return the Truth Teller to how it was before, pointing out the money it will save. However, Oscar sabotages them and points out that Enervate has been paying rent on a storage unit for nine years, but the unit is actually an apartment—Ken's apartment that was only supposed to be temporary. Ken agrees to use the "storage unit" money for the paper in order to avoid being found out, restoring the Truth Teller's budget.
| 4 | 4 | "TTT vs the Blogger" | Paul Lieberstein | Amanda Rosenberg | September 4, 2025 |
The Truth Teller hosts journalism students from a local high school who tell Ned that the paper's main competition is a blog run by a fellow student named SoWesley. Ned is shocked and jealous after finding out that the blog has over 300,000 subscribers, and leaves an insulting comment on one of the articles; SoWesley uses this to turn public opinion against Ned and the paper. Ken forces a humiliated Ned to apologize, but SoWesley does not accept the apology. Esmeralda gleefully tries to entice SoWesley to come and work for TTT Online, but he turns against her as well. Esmeralda and Ned team up to take down SoWelsey by leaking fake information to him, proving he does not verify his sources and ruining his reputation. Mare, an alumnus of the high school, learns that beloved theatre teacher and Juilliard School alumnus "Mr. K" is retiring and decides to interview him about his career. Oscar tags along to review the final musical Mr. K is directing, a gender-swapped version of Mean Girls called Mean Boys. However, Mare has only gone to confront Mr. K over not giving her the lead in The King and I while she was a student, as she believes he only gave leads to kids whose parents bought expensive ads in the program. Oscar reminds her that she has no concrete proof of her theory, and she publishes a mostly positive article alongside Oscar's scathing review. Later, however, she is tipped off that Mr. K never attended Juilliard and edits her article to expose him. Detrick unsuccessfully tries to woo Nicole, but Travis tells him he's coming on too strong. Detrick apologizes and admits that he does have feelings for her but will be more low-key in the future. Later, Travis flies a drone off the roof and spots Nicole and Detrick kissing at a café.
| 5 | 5 | "Scam Alert!" | Tazbah Chavez | Mo Welch | September 4, 2025 |
Ned briefs the team about a catfishing scam targeting lonely Toledo residents. As he describes the catfisher's techniques, Esmeralda quietly retreats to her office; the team realize that she is one of his victims. Ned, eager to blow the story up into an award-winning six part piece, encourages the others to make profiles on the dating app "Latch" to catch the catfisher while he convinces Esmeralda to provide a quote. Esmeralda, however, refuses to cooperate as she is in denial and insists that the relationship is genuine. She provides a photo and video of "Jarson" as proof, but the others point out that "Jarson" is in fact actor Josh Holloway and the catfisher bought a video message from him on Cameo. Esmeralda remains unconvinced until Nicole buys another message from Josh so he can explain the scam to Esmeralda himself. Ned comforts a distraught and embarrassed Esmeralda on the roof, ultimately publishing the story without her quote. Detrick, having deleted Latch after his first hookup with Nicole, is discouraged to find out she has not and views their relationship as strictly casual. He accepts a date from a local weather reporter to make Nicole jealous, but she is unfazed and encourages him to go. After work, Mare, Nicole, Adelola, and Kimberly take Esmeralda out clubbing to cheer her up.
| 6 | 6 | "Churnalism" | Jason Woliner | Eric Rahill | September 4, 2025 |
Esmeralda is eager to contribute an advertorial about a Korean skincare product to the Truth Teller, but Ned shoots it down. Instead, he decides that the team will review products in the style of Wirecutter, using free PR from Esmeralda's Amazon affiliate shop. The news team each tries a product to varying levels of success: Ned suffers a chemical burn from the skincare mask, Nicole gets food poisoning from unrefrigerated kombucha, and Adelola goads Oscar into turning up the intensity on a painful ab-workout machine, claiming it is not as painful as menstrual cramps. Adam wants to review a supplement, but Ken gives him gas station male enhancement pills instead, as he wanted to see their effects before taking them himself. Adam is terrified that the pills will work, since he cannot afford a fifth child and his wife does not believe in contraception. Esmeralda, enraged that Ned stole her story, decides that she will report on the park bathroom closure that he submitted. Ned assigns Mare to keep an eye on her, but the situation spirals as Esmeralda becomes determined to make the story into a spectacle. Despite her dramatics, Esmeralda actually uncovers evidence that the closure was not approved in a local hearing, and sends Mare undercover to flirt with the project manager and obtain proof. The story is a success, but Ned has an uncomfortable moment with Mare after revealing he believed Esmeralda's lie about her being asexual, which upsets her.
| 7 | 7 | "I Love You" | Jennifer Celotta | Alex Edelman | September 4, 2025 |
Marv is working on the Truth Teller's floor while his offices are being painted, and the staff are on edge having him around. Adam shows Marv the pre-written obituary they will publish when he dies; Marv is discouraged to see that his only legacy is running local Toledo businesses. Ned and Marv begin to bond, and Marv accidentally tells Ned "love you" at the end of a meeting; Ned enthusiastically returns the sentiment in front of the whole office. The entire staff teases Ned about this except for Mare, who is still angry and refuses to accept his apologies. Ned and Marv begin to develop more of a father-son relationship, as Ned has a poor relationship with his own father and Marv has no children. However, things become inappropriately intense, and Marv reminds Ned that they have a strictly business relationship. Ken is convinced that Ned is trying to steal his job and partners with Esmeralda, who is still bitter that Ned outranks her. The two scheme to have Marv removed from Enervate and replace him with one of Ken's friends from college, but they are overheard by Nate, the building's janitor. They attempt to buy his silence by promising him an eventual promotion, but the plan falls apart when they realize that the documentary crew have recorded everything. In order to save face, they claim that the scheme was a test of Nate's loyalty and tell Marv that Nate has a drug problem so he will not believe anything Nate says. Later, as Nate is cleaning the office, Mare's computer shows a text conversation between her and Ned where she teases him about the "I love you" incident, indicating she has forgiven him.
| 8 | 8 | "Church and State" | Matt Sohn | Ben Philippe | September 4, 2025 |
Ned finds out that Mare has been sleeping at the office since the plumbing in her apartment building has been broken for several days. Ken, acting as boss while Marv is on vacation, tries to get Ned to publish a glowing review of Softees' "Man Wipes", but Ned refuses, insisting on a total "separation of church and state" between the Truth Teller and its parent company. When Mare, Nicole, Barry, and Oscar go to investigate the plumbing problem, they find that a large mass has blocked the city sewer pipes—a giant block of fused Man Wipes. Mare tries to surreptitiously gather information about the flushability of the wipes from Kimberly, but accidentally tips off Ken and the Softees team. Ken demands that Ned kill the story, but he refuses. The Softees team scrambles to try and sell their remaining stock before the story breaks, while Ken recruits Travis to help him destroy evidence. Mare and Nicole discover videos of Ned's former life as an arrogant, aggressive Softees salesman, but he is embarrassed by who he used to be. Ned resigns in an unsuccessful attempt to get Ken to back down, but Mare reaches a truce with Ken to save both of their companies and Ned's job. They urge Ned to return to his salesman past to help sell the remaining stock of Man Wipes, which he does by rebranding them as all-purpose cleaning mitts that get thrown in the trash, not flushed. Esmeralda unsuccessfully tries to get her pre-teen son Matteo cast in a Softees commercial.
| 9 | 9 | "Matching Ponchos" | Dave Rogers | L.E. Correia | September 4, 2025 |
Mare and Detrick have been approved to take a road trip to investigate a potential cult, but Detrick backs out after he has a dream that he joined the cult. Ned volunteers to take his place, and he and Mare bond on the drive. When a fellow reporter calls Mare and praises her work on the Softees clog story, Mare inadvertently insults Ned's authority as her editor and boss. In response, he begins acting overly involved and ruins their chance at investigating the cult. Tensions build on the drive home, but things boil over when Ned claims that Mare sees him as unqualified for his job, while Mare claims that Ned is too obsessed with being seen as the boss all the time. However, their argument abruptly ends when Detrick calls to tell them that both Mare and the Truth Teller have been nominated for Ohio Journalism Awards, and they celebrate happily. Marv has Ken doing damage control over the clog incident, but he makes things worse and creates another PR disaster. Ken tries to use Nicole as a scapegoat, but she outsmarts him and gives his apology on a local news show, improving Enervate's reputation and impressing Marv. Oscar receives a mean comment from a troll account and becomes obsessed with tracking down the owner, despite his coworkers telling him to brush it off. He traces the account's IP address to Ann, Marv's assistant, who claims that someone else must be using her unlocked computer when she's away from it. She later reveals to the camera crew that she is in fact the one leaving the comments. Esmeralda has been having erotic dreams about Barry after seeing a young photo of him and becomes convinced he is an incubus she must rid herself of, much to his confusion.
| 10 | 10 | "The Ohio Journalism Awards" | Jeffrey Blitz | Paul Lieberstein | September 4, 2025 |
The Truth Teller is nominated for three awards at the Ohio Journalism Awards, which it has not won since the 1970s. Ned claims that he doesn't care if he wins, but he secretly craves the validation from a win. Mare brings a date, Theo, and seems pleased when Ned begins acting jealous. Oscar and Mare both win the awards they have been nominated for, but Ned still insists that he doesn't care if he wins or not. Mare encourages him to admit that he wants something for once. The two leave to review Ned's speech, but Mare convinces Ned to crash a wedding in an adjacent ballroom where the two flirt and dance before getting kicked out of the building. Mare receives a text that the Truth Teller has won, and they scramble to find a way back inside so Ned can accept. Esmeralda, feeling sidelined, draws attention by hijacking both the Truth Teller's acceptance speech and the in memoriam slideshow. Ken is worried that Oscar will suggest that Marv fire him to cut costs and orchestrates a situation where he can save Marv's life; he fails, and Oscar saves both Marv and his brother from choking. Nicole finds out that Detrick has not been seeing other people like she thought, and he breaks off their relationship as he is unable to remain casual with her. Oscar, having observed that Marv is secretly in love with Ann, subtly encourages Ned to pursue Mare despite his hangups about being her boss. Ned goes to Mare's hotel room, expecting her to be with Theo, but she is actually with a devastated Nicole. Ned admits his feelings for Mare, which she returns. They agree to kiss once to get it out of their system, but things quickly turn passionate. Ned pulls away, now worried about the future of their relationship.

=== Season 2 (2026) ===
| No. overall | No. in season | Title | Directed by | Written by | Original release date |
|---|---|---|---|---|---|
| 11 | 1 | "The Best of Us" | Matt Sohn | Eric Rahill | September 9, 2026 |
After winning at the Ohio Journalism Awards, Ned plans on asking Marv for an additional $100,000 budget, but upon arriving to work discovers that Bill Patterson, a Softees salesman, has died. Marv asks the team to write a story about Bill, which Ned agrees to as he wants Marv in a good mood when he asks for the budget increase. Marv says he will read the story out loud at a commemoration for Bill later that day. The reporters discover that Bill was an ex-mercenary in the Wagner Group and dealt meth in addition to his work at Softees. Esmeralda puts on a show about how distraught she is about Bill's death. Ned appears to avoid Mare at work all day, offending her. After work, he pulls her into a stairwell to kiss her, explaining he was just trying to hide it from the rest of the office. Ned realizes Mare didn't understand his plan, and apologizes. Ned reveals to Marv what he's discovered about Bill, and Marv is shocked but reminds Ned that the paper is called the Truth-Teller. Esmeralda is embarrassed after details about Bill's mercenary life and meth-dealing are revealed at his commemoration
| 12 | 2 | "Weekend Ned" | Greg Daniels | Gbemisola Ikumelo | September 9, 2026 |
Ned and Mare have planned a secret weekend getaway, but they first have to wait to report who wins the leadership election for the city's garbagemen union. Unable to wait, Ned instructs Adelola and Adam to handle the announcement. In order to hide their relationship and their weekend plans, Ned tells the office that he's going to a doctor's appointment while Mare says she's going to visit her aunt before heading to an army reunion, though Nicole deduces that she's lying. While at their weekend retreat, a write-in candidate wins the election, forcing Ned and Mare to walk Adelola and Adam through the reporting remotely. Ned tells Mare that he feels guilty that he's enjoying working with Mare rather than just relaxing with her, but Mare is touched by his earnestness. The couple return to the office to handle the story. Meanwhile, Esmeralda, convinced that being a single mom is why her son Matteo is always benched during his soccer games, enters into a fake relationship with Ken as the league only allows guardians to come to games. Another mom rats Esmeralda out to the league commissioner, who takes five points from Matteo's team after Esmeralda fakes kissing Ken.
| 13 | 3 | "Hearst's Mistress" | Dave Rogers | Amanda Rosenberg | September 9, 2026 |
A new billboard celebrating TTT's awards backfires when it instead reminds people to cancel their subscriptions. Desperate to reverse the tide, Ned decides to engage in a "journalistic crusade" against potholes. Ned and Mare go to Mare's apartment to look at a large pothole on her street, but before they leave Ned discloses to Enervate's HR rep Lisa that he's in a relationship with Mare. After arriving at the pothole, he begins to feel ill, and the couple go inside Mare's apartment while she reheats leftovers. A man enters the room, and Ned mistakes him for a radiator technician before realizing he's Mare's father, whose surprise visit embarrasses Mare. After Detrick asks Travis how he gets so many good quotes, Travis confesses that the quotes he puts into his stories are fabricated, so Detrick takes Travis to a local experience park to practice getting real quotes. Travis fails and, feeling guilty, resigns as a journalist, but Ned hires him as a photojournalist after seeing his pictures of the park. Meanwhile, Marv makes Oscar an offer to syndicate his sudoku puzzle "Mr. Digit." Oscar asks for $1.2 million, prompting Ken and Esmeralda to create a knockoff game called "Señor Number" so they can also make millions, although Marv says their version is racist. Oscar eventually agrees to sell for $25,000.
| 14 | 4 | "Impressing a Cop" | Jennifer Celotta | Ben Philippe | September 9, 2026 |
Esmeralda is disappointed that the haunted house she took Matteo to was unsatisfactory, not realizing that she inadvertently took him to visit a halfway house across the street. She writes an article about her disappointment, which members of the public mistakenly believe is a progressive piece about how the halfway house's residents are not scary. Ned, trying to cultivate a source at the police department, agrees to meet up with a cop he recently met at a gun range, bringing Detrick, Travis, and Mare with him. After screaming when firing his first shot, Ned lies about being bit by a rat to avoid embarrassment, even piercing his skin with a pen to create a fake rat bite. Travis, Detrick, and Mare eagerly begin investigating the presence of rats in the gun range, though Ned continues to discourage them. Mare realizes Ned is lying, and Ned confesses that he was not trying to impress the cop, but impress Mare. Meanwhile, Nicole believes that Mare lied to her about where she was the weekend she was away with Ned because she has a new best friend.
| 15 | 5 | "Dueling Pencils" | Tazbah Chavez | Megan Neuringer | September 9, 2026 |
Ned and Mare start a podcast called "Dueling Pencils" where they take opposing stances on various topics. Impressed by the podcast, which was Nicole's idea, Marv promotes her to head of circulation and lets her take Esmeralda's office, moving Esmeralda to the reception area. Detrick pitches a story about a man who is suing Facebook for defamation after his ex-girlfriend posted about him in a local Facebook group for women to discuss men they've had bad dating experiences with. Ned and Mare start debating over who's in the right, and decide to make it the topic of their next podcast, which will be hosted in front of a live audience at the local library. Their argument quickly begins to spill over into other parts of their job, including at a lunch with a local politician about potential issues with the Glass Club, a local club for Toledo's elite. At the library, Ned and Mare are joined by the man and his ex-girlfriend, and realize that both are not what they expected at all. They make up and leave in the middle of the podcast.
| 16 | 6 | "125 Years Young" | Yana Gorskaya | Patrick Kang & Michael Levin | September 9, 2026 |
To celebrate the Truth-Teller's 125th anniversary, Ned invites local journalists from the area to a party, and tracks down the paper's old delivery boys, who now live in a retirement home. The other journalists, however, are unimpressed by Ned's romanticizing of the profession and critical of the cost of the event. The event takes a turn for the worse after the former delivery boys struggle to ride the bikes Ned got for them for a photo op. Meanwhile, after having gone eight years avoiding mandatory HR training, Lisa traps Esmeralda in a large box and forcibly taken to the session. Annoyed by the lack of engagement in the HR videos, Esmeralda forces the other attendees to film new videos that she feels better demonstrate the concepts, making the other attendees uncomfortable. After Mare realizes that one of the local journalists will publish a story that makes Ned look bad, she asks Marv to kill the piece. Marv calls in Ned and informs him that he's killing the story into the Glass Club, where many Truth-Teller advertisers are members, because Mare thinks it's acceptable to kill the negative piece about Ned. Ned is offended that Mare would do something like that. Marv tells them that he knows they're dating; Mare is unaware that Ned had disclosed their relationship to HR, and is hurt that Ned didn't tell her. Marv says he can't justifiably hold off advertisers asking him to kill the Glass Club investigation if the editor's girlfriend is trying to kill negative stories she doesn't like herself. Mare suggests that she leave to work as a temporary reporter for the Cincinnati Chronicle, and Ned and Marv say it's a good idea.
| 17 | 7 | "Tornado Alert" | Jason Woliner | Alain Bala & Tom McDonald | September 9, 2026 |
Ned and the team launch a new tornado alert system on the Truth-Teller app as tornado season begins in the region. Travis and Adelola go to report on a shed recently damaged by a tornado, but Travis decides to go tornado chasing. Adelola reveals she doesn't believe in tornados, to Travis's incredulity. When the tornado finally arrives, Travis lies down on top of Adelola as the wind blows him up and down, creating an awkward moment. Ned begins to behave increasingly irrationally as Mare, in Cincinnati at her new job, does not reply to his texts about the imminent tornado. Mare is struggling to fit in at her new job, especially after she tells her colleagues at her introduction that 92% of her DNA is neanderthal. After the tornado passes, Ned goes to Cincinnati, before realizing he's been overreacting. He calls Mare on his train ride home. Meanwhile, Esmeralda is worried that she's a narcissist after Ned calls her one at work, prompting her to run to a psychic and pay $200 to be told she's not.
| 18 | 8 | "Secret Team" | Claire Scanlon | Mo Welch | September 9, 2026 |
Ned wants the team to report on two casualties from the tornado, but hands the story off to Adelola after realizing that one of the casualties was a waiter who fell off the roof at the Glass Club. Adelola discovers no police report was filed, but Ned continues to resist getting involved with the story. He eventually caves, gathering everyone except for Esmeralda, Barry, and Adam to discuss how to proceed with the story and to determine if there was a motive for any foul play. Detrick discovers that other waiters were jealous of the deceased Glass Club employee as he got more tips, while Oscar realizes that he was also a union organizer. Nicole is upset after Detrick denies having been in a workplace relationship, so she goes to Lisa to retroactively disclose their previous relationship, inadvertently tipping Lisa off that Detrick is now single. Mare's pitched stories are continually rejected by her editor. She learns that a local baseball player is the first to pitch with a bionic hand, and her colleagues love the idea.
| 19 | 9 | "Who's Marv Marving?" | Paul Lieberstein | Paul Lieberstein | September 9, 2026 |
Marv agrees to let Ned continue to quietly investigate the Glass Club. After Mare brushes off Nicole's complaints about Detrick denying their relationship, Nicole implies to the others that Mare is sleeping with a boss, leading them to believe it's Marv. Ned calls Mare to tell her about the rumor, and Mare is distressed that people will think her job is illegitimate as a result. In an effort to kill the rumor, Ann spreads another one that Mare can't be in a relationship due to a war injury. While Ann and Marv go to the Glass Club to surreptitiously investigate the waiter's death, Ned accidentally reveals to Travis and Detrick that he's dating Mare, which eventually reaches Cincinnati. Ned and Detrick realize that the railing on the Glass Club roof is significantly lower than it should be. After Mare calls Ned to ask about the latest rumor, Ned confesses he revealed their relationship to others at the office. Mare breaks up with him. Meanwhile, Esmeralda decides to pursue a relationship with a wealthy businessman in his 90s, who seems to believe he's hiring a night nurse.
| 20 | 10 | "The NS Board" | Jeffrey Blitz | Greg Daniels & Michael Koman | September 9, 2026 |
Ned continues to work on his investigation of the Glass Club with Detrick. Adelola refuses to discuss what happened during the tornado with Travis, before relenting. Travis indicates to Adelola that he likes her. After showing their investigation to a lawyer, Ned, Detrick, and Marv are frustrated they can't publish their piece because of Marv's previous promise to end any negative stories about the Glass Club. Agitated, Ned faints and is taken to the hospital, and Mare rushes back to Toledo, but the couple argue after it is revealed that Ned's sickness was caused by a now-moldy muffin that Mare had given him after the Ohio Journalism Awards that he never opened. While Ned implores Mare to not sign the lease in Cincinnati she was about to accept, Mare walks out. Ned eventually realizes that while the Truth-Teller cannot publish the Glass Club investigation, the Cincinnati Chronicle can. Detrick and Ned go to Cincinnati and convince Mare and her editors to publish the piece, with Detrick's name attached to it as well. Detrick is flattered after Nicole shows up in Cincinnati, revealing she had followed him all the way there and brought him his favorite snack. After the Chronicle's editors sign off, Ned again asks Mare to return to Toledo, not for him, but for the Truth-Teller. Mare says she'll consider it and tells Ned to stay the night on her couch as it's too late to go back to Toledo. Ned tells the camera crew he loves Mare and can't live without her. Meanwhile Esmeralda, distraught over Matteo's recent C-minus in math, decides to go undercover at Matteo's school to prove her suspicions that the school is biased against boys. After getting into a fistfight with Matteo, the school asks her to leave.

== Production ==
=== Development ===
An advertisement for The Paper in New York City

In January 2024, it was announced that Greg Daniels, the developer of the American mockumentary sitcom The Office, was developing a follow-up series set in a new office with new characters, but based in the same fictional universe as the original series. In March 2024, it was announced that the spinoff series would be co-created by Daniels and Michael Koman.

In May 2024, it was announced that Peacock had ordered the untitled comedy mockumentary series co-created by Daniels and Koman, which will feature the fictional documentary crew that followed the Scranton branch of Dunder Mifflin, follow a declining historic Midwestern newspaper and its publisher try to resurrect itself with volunteer reporters. In June 2024, the series title was revealed to be The Paper. Production of the series began in July 2024. The fictional newspaper around which the series is based was later revealed to be called The Truth Teller, located in Toledo, Ohio.

The series is executive produced by Greg Daniels, Michael Koman, Ricky Gervais, Stephen Merchant, Howard Klein, and Ben Silverman. Production companies involved with the series are Universal Television. In September 2025, ahead of the series premiere, Peacock renewed the series for a second season.

=== Casting ===
In April 2024, it was announced that Domhnall Gleeson and Sabrina Impacciatore would be starring in the series. In September 2024, Melvin Gregg, Chelsea Frei and Ramona Young joined the cast. The following month, Gbemisola Ikumelo, Alex Edelman, Tim Key, and Eric Rahill were cast, with Allan Havey, Nancy Lenehan, Molly Ephraim and Tracy Letts added to the recurring cast in November. In February 2025, it was announced that Oscar Nunez would be reprising his role as Oscar Martinez from The Office. In June 2026, it was announced that Jon Lovitz, Andy Richter, Lisa Gilroy, Matt Braunger, Toks Olagundoye and Phil Hendrie would guest star in the second season.

== Release ==
The Paper premiered on Peacock on September 4, 2025, with all 10 episodes. It made its broadcast debut on NBC on November 10, 2025 but heavily edited by up to 8 minutes for time. The second season was released on September 9, 2026.

In Australia, it streams on Binge and airs on Foxtel. In the UK and Ireland, it streams on Now and airs on Sky UK. In Canada, it streams on StackTV and aired on Showcase.

== Reception ==
=== Critical response ===
Critical response of The Paper
| Season | Rotten Tomatoes | Metacritic |
|---|---|---|
| 1 | 85% (108 reviews) | 66 (39 reviews) |
| 2 | 78% (27 reviews) | 73 (9 reviews) |

==== Season 1 ====
On Rotten Tomatoes, the first season holds an approval rating of 85% based on 108 critic reviews with an average score of 7.2/10. The website's critics consensus reads, "The Paper still has edits to be made but gets off to a promising start, establishing amusing dynamics and a genuine conviction for journalism that make for a potentially worthy successor to The Office." On Metacritic, it has a weighted average score of 66 out of 100 based on 39 critics, indicating "generally favorable" reviews.

Aramide Tinubu of Variety gave a generally positive review, noting that the first half of the season "feels a bit clunky" (reminiscent of both the first seasons of Parks and Recreation and The Office), but by episode 5, "showcases what The Paper could be, and paves the way for the remaining episodes, which are as hilarious as they are memorable." Liam Matthews of TV Guide rated it 6 out of 10 and wrote, "The Paper has funny jokes and enjoyable performances, and is pretty instantly forgettable — a disappointing outcome for any show, but doubly so for the follow-up to an unforgettable one."

==== Season 2 ====
The second season has a Rotten Tomatoes approval rating of 78% based on 27 reviews, with an average rating of 7.5/10. The website's critics consensus reads, "The Paper continues to capitalize on its franchise roots while also making a distinct name for itself as a breezy, fun-loving, intriguing successor to The Office in a solid second season." On Metacritic, it has a score of 73 out of 100 based on 9 reviews, indicating "generally favorable" reviews. Writing for The Guardian, Stuart Heritage called it "one of the best comedies on TV right now," particularly praising Impacciatore's performance. Jackson McHenry of Vulture gave it a mixed review, writing that the show is a "sitcom trying to fool itself" and that in order to improve, it "needs to forge something new and idiosyncratic."

=== Viewership ===
The Paper was among the top ten original streaming series during the first two weeks of September 2025. According to ranking data from ShowLabs, The Paper ranked #1 on Peacock in the United States from September 4–14, 2025.

=== Accolades ===
| Award | Date of ceremony | Category | Recipient | Result | Ref. |
|---|---|---|---|---|---|
| Astra Creative Arts Awards | December 11, 2025 | Best Casting | The Paper | Nominated | |
| Critics' Choice Awards | January 4, 2026 | Best Supporting Actor in a Comedy Series | Oscar Nunez | Nominated | |
| IFTA Film & Drama Awards | February 20, 2026 | Best Lead Actor – Drama | Domhnall Gleeson | Nominated | |
