= Joe Pera Talks with You =

American observational comedy television series

- Season 2 poster
- Genre: Sitcom; Slice of life Observational
- Created by: Joe Pera
- Showrunner: Amalia Levari
- Directed by: Marty Schousboe
- Starring: Joe Pera; Jo Firestone; Conner O'Malley; Gene Kelly
- Composer: Ryan Dann
- Country of origin: United States
- Original language: English
- No. of seasons: 3
- No. of episodes: 32

Production
- Executive producers: Joe Pera; Conner O'Malley; Marty Schousboe; Jo Firestone (Note: Firestone was co-producer in season one and executive producer in season two.); Mark Costa (Note: Mark Costa is executive producer for Factual Productions, Inc. in season one and Alive and Kicking, Inc. in season two.); Paige Boudreaux (Note: Boudreaux and Roig are executive producers for Alive and Kicking, Inc. beginning in season three. Both also served as executive producers for "Relaxing Footage with Joe Pera" under Factual Productions, Inc.); Jonathan Roig; Keith Crofford (Note: Crofford, Newman and Tang are executive producers for Williams Street, with Crofford serving during seasons one and two, Tang during season three, and Newman for the series' run.); Walter Newman; Cameron Tang
- Producers: Jonathan Roig (Note: Roig is producer for season two.); Dan Licata (Note: Licata and Stone are co-producers in season two); Patrick Stone; Jackie Stolfi (Note: Stolfi was producer for season one.)
- Editor: Whit Conway
- Running time: 11 minutes
- Production companies: Chestnut Walnut Unlimited; Factual Productions, Inc. (season 1 + special); Alive and Kicking, Inc. (season 2); Williams Street

Original release
- Network: Adult Swim
- Release: May 20, 2018 – December 13, 2021

Joe Pera Talks with You is an American comedy television series created by Joe Pera for Adult Swim. The show stars Pera as a fictionalized version of himself, a mild-mannered choir teacher in Marquette, Michigan, who directly addresses the audience about seemingly mundane, everyday topics such as dance, pancakes, minerals, etc. Diving into these topics, viewers get an introspective glimpse into his slowly changing life in the Upper Peninsula and the interaction with people around him.

The series was produced by Pera's Chestnut Walnut Unlimited, Cartoon Network Studios' live-action division (Factual Productions, Inc, and Alive and Kicking, Inc.), and Williams Street. It entered development following the success of the 2016 specials Joe Pera Talks You to Sleep, which was animated, and Joe Pera Helps You Find the Perfect Christmas Tree, airing as part of Infomercials, with the first season premiering on May 20, 2018. The second season premiered on December 6, 2019. A third and final season aired from November to December 2021. In July 2022, Pera announced the show was canceled after three seasons. Reruns aired on Cartoon Network's ACME Night programming block starting from 2023. Episodes are available through Adult Swim digital platforms and on demand.

Joe Pera Talks with You received critical acclaim, with most praise going to its unique writing, slow-paced and earnest tone, and witty humor; the show's cancellation similarly drew strong reactions and tributes from critics. Screen Rant compares the show's sincere tone favorably to Mister Rogers' Neighborhood, while Vice hailed the show as "the best thing Adult Swim has ever done".

== Synopsis ==
The series stars comedian Joe Pera as a fictionalized version of himself, living in Marquette, Michigan and teaching choir at a local middle school. He talks directly to the viewer about everyday subject matter such as iron, Sunday breakfast, fall drives, and sleeping. Between these lessons, viewers get a glimpse into Pera's quiet life in the Upper Peninsula.

The show is not heavily plot-driven, with each episode revolving around a single lesson; however, emotional arcs are built up over the season as the show goes on.

In the first season, Joe meets his new neighbors, the Melskys, and his workmate Sarah, a staunch survivalist. As the two got to know each other better and become romantically involved, Joe discovers that she is paranoid about bad things in the future; she prepares for any eventualities with a bunker filled with supplies to last her for years. Joe grapples with the reality that the world can be a scary, hard place. This realization goes against his optimistic view of life.

During the second season, Joe attempts over the course of the season to build a bean arch in his garden. The arch eventually grows to full maturity in the finale. Joe also deals with a loss in the family following his grandma's death. Joe attempts to cope better with the grief by talking directly to the viewers about the matter.

For the third season, Joe is busy helping people around him handle everyday tasks, while dealing with the fallout of his grandmother's death, including the money he gets from selling her house. In the finale, Joe purchases an empty land lot from his neighbor with the money, takes Sarah to the lot for a viewing, and professes his wish of building a cabin there.

== Characters ==
- Joe Pera (Joe Pera) is a self-proclaimed "soft-handed choir teacher" at Little Deer Middle School in Marquette. Though he is very introspective, with a vast knowledge of specific concepts, he expresses naïveté in his social interactions.
- Sarah Conner (Jo Firestone) is a new band teacher working at Little Deer Middle School. Many of her beliefs are rooted in conspiracies and fears for the future, as evidenced by her construction of a fortified basement below her house. She becomes Joe's love interest over the course of the first season.
- Mike Melsky (Conner O'Malley) is Joe's neighbor. The two meet in the show's first episode, when Mike attempts to buy Joe's house after neighborhood kids place a For Sale sign in his yard as a prank. He is generally sarcastic, short-tempered, and incredulous towards Joe.
- Sue Melsky (Jo Scott) is the wife of Mike Melsky. She is more friendly and accepting towards Joe.
- Gene Gibson (Gene Kelly), Joe's best friend. He likes to help Joe teach his lessons, and often ends up giving Joe advice in the process.
- "Nana" Josephine Pera (Nancy Cornell in season 1, Pat Vern Harris in season 2) is Joe's grandmother, based on his real grandmother of the same name.
- Gordy (Mark Borchardt) is a janitor at Little Deer Middle School and an acquaintance of Joe and Sarah.
- Gus (Fitzgerald William) is Joe's lazy basset hound.

== Predecessors ==
The first Pera project to appear on Adult Swim was the animated short, Joe Pera Talks You to Sleep. It was aired as part of the network's Infomercials series on March 21, 2016. The short was animated and directed by Kieran O'Hare, who had previously animated a Joe Pera comedy bit for his YouTube channel. O'Hare applied the same art style to the Adult Swim special.

On December 9, 2016, a second special, Joe Pera Helps You Find the Perfect Christmas Tree, premiered on Adult Swim. The live-action special was more tonally similar to what would become Joe Pera Talks with You. Like the series, it was directed by Marty Schousboe and written by Pera alongside Dan Licata, and made by the same production team under the name Rent Now Productions. It also takes place in the same location in Michigan where Pera works as a choir teacher. It features characters that would later appear in the series, such as Gene, the Melsky family and Joe's Nana Josephine. Differences include Joe's dog Gus being a black bloodhound (or possibly a black lab mix) instead of a Basset Hound portrayed by Fitzgerald William, Joe living in a different house, and Joe's co-worker and love interest Sarah, portrayed in the series by Jo Firestone, being absent entirely. These differences imply the special and series are not within the same continuity. Joe's Nana Josephine was also played by his real-life grandmother, Josephine Pera, who died in 2017. The character Gene Gibson is also present in the Christmas special, but not portrayed by real-life camera operator, Gene Kelly (not to be confused with the actor of the same name), as he was in the series. Pera appeared on local talk shows to promote the special.

== Episodes ==
| Season | Episodes | Originally released | |
| Season | Episodes | First released | Last released |
|---|---|---|---|
| 1 | 9 | May 20, 2018 | June 17, 2018 |
| 2 | 13 | December 6, 2019 | January 31, 2020 |
| Special | | May 22, 2020 | |
| 3 | 9 | November 8, 2021 | December 13, 2021 |

=== Season 1 (2018) ===
| No. overall | No. in season | Title | Directed by | Written by | Original release date | US viewers (millions) |
|---|---|---|---|---|---|---|
| 1 | 1 | "Joe Pera Shows You Iron" | Marty Schousboe | Joe Pera | May 20, 2018 | 0.631 |
Joe attempts to educate viewers on the rocks and minerals of his Michigan home, but is distracted by the thought that he might have to sell his house.
| 2 | 2 | "Joe Pera Takes You to Breakfast" | Marty Schousboe | Conner O'Malley | May 20, 2018 | 0.573 |
Joe teaches viewers about different ways people eat breakfast while trying to decide on his own breakfast choice.
| 3 | 3 | "Joe Pera Takes You on a Fall Drive" | Marty Schousboe | Conner O'Malley | May 27, 2018 | 0.631 |
Joe takes viewers on his annual fall drive, where he muses on fall and gives his jack-o-lantern a proper funeral.
| 4 | 4 | "Joe Pera Shows You How to Dance" | Marty Schousboe | Jo Firestone | May 27, 2018 | 0.549 |
Joe goes to a coworker's wedding, shows viewers how to dance, and gets to know his coworker Sarah better.
| 5 | 5 | "Joe Pera Talks You Back to Sleep" | Marty Schousboe | Amalia Levari | June 3, 2018 | 0.665 |
Joe muses on topics to help viewers go back to sleep after being awakened by thunder.
| 6 | 6 | "Joe Pera Reads You the Church Announcements" | Marty Schousboe | Dan Licata | June 3, 2018 | 0.556 |
Joe attempts to read out the church announcements, but is distracted by his recent hearing of "Baba O'Riley" by The Who for the first time.
| 7 | 7 | "Joe Pera Lights Up the Night with You" | Marty Schousboe | Dan Licata | June 10, 2018 | 0.523 |
Joe babysits his neighbor's daughter for New Year's.
| 8 | 8 | "Joe Pera Talks to You About the Rat Wars of Alberta, Canada (1950–Present Day)" | Marty Schousboe | Jo Firestone | June 10, 2018 | 0.459 |
Joe and Sarah try to put on a musical about the Rat Wars of Alberta, Canada, but their relationship gets in the way.
| 9 | 9 | "Joe Pera Answers Your Questions About Cold Weather Sports" | Marty Schousboe | Story by : Joe Pera and Amalia Levari; Teleplay by : Joe Pera | June 17, 2018 | 0.516 |
Joe and Sarah learn to like each other despite their differences. Notes: Double-length episode

=== Season 2 (2019–20) ===
| No. overall | No. in season | Title | Directed by | Written by | Original release date | US viewers (millions) |
|---|---|---|---|---|---|---|
| 10 | 1 | "Joe Pera Talks with You About Beans" | Marty Schousboe | Joe Pera | December 6, 2019 | 0.517 |
Joe constructs a bean arch in his backyard, and invites his neighbors and his new girlfriend Sarah over to see it.
| 11 | 2 | "Joe Pera Takes You on a Hike" | Marty Schousboe | Nathan Min | December 6, 2019 | 0.479 |
Joe and Sarah go on a hike up Sugarloaf Mountain while contemplating how the rest of the school staff is reacting to their relationship.
| 12 | 3 | "Joe Pera Waits with You" | Marty Schousboe | Katie Dolan | December 13, 2019 | 0.592 |
Joe sits and waits for his Nana to finish her appointment at the hair salon before they both go out to eat fried fish.
| 13 | 4 | "Joe Pera Guides You Through the Dark" | Marty Schousboe | Marty Schousboe | December 13, 2019 | 0.484 |
When the power goes out in Joe's neighborhood, he visits the Melskys to see how they're dealing with it.
| 14 | 5 | "Joe Pera Takes You to the Grocery Store" | Marty Schousboe | Conner O'Malley | January 3, 2020 | 0.527 |
Joe takes the viewers on his weekly trip to the grocery store.
| 15 | 6 | "Joe Pera Goes to Dave Wojcek's Bachelor Party with You" | Marty Schousboe | Dan Licata | January 3, 2020 | 0.444 |
At Sue Melsky's request, Joe goes to her brother Dave's bachelor party in the woods with Mike, where Mike reveals that Sue kicked him out of the house. Afterwards, the Melskys' kids join Joe and Sarah for dinner.
| 16 | 7 | "Joe Pera Gives You Piano Lessons" | Marty Schousboe | Jo Firestone | January 10, 2020 | 0.486 |
Joe teaches Lulu Gibson how to play the piano in time for her 40th anniversary with Gene.
| 17 | 8 | "Joe Pera Watches Internet Videos with You" | Marty Schousboe | Nathan Min | January 10, 2020 | 0.408 |
Joe and Sarah sit in bed and scroll through various videos on their phone all night, before discovering that Joe's bean arch has fully grown. Guest stars Janeane Garofalo and John Ventimiglia.
| 18 | 9 | "Joe Pera Has a Surprise for You" | Marty Schousboe | Dan Licata | January 17, 2020 | 0.489 |
Inspired by the movie Rat Race, Joe organizes a scavenger hunt amongst his friends and neighbors to find $115, but only Brad Cam and Big Jeff participate in it, and they team up to boot. While Joe is waiting with some other friends for Brad and Jeff to return he gets an urgent call about his Nana. When Brad Cam and Big Jeff return to Joe's with the money, Sarah reveals that Joe's Nana has passed away.
| 19 | 10 | "Joe Pera Helps You Write an Obituary (Note: This is the onscreen title; on Adult Swim's website and apps, the title is given as "Joe Pera Helps You Write.")" | Marty Schousboe | Jo Firestone | January 17, 2020 | 0.416 |
Joe is unable to come up with an obituary for his recently deceased grandmother. Sarah takes a moment to teach the viewers about edible plants.
| 20 | 11 | "Joe Pera Shows You How to Do Good Fashion" | Marty Schousboe | Katie Dolan and Conner O'Malley | January 24, 2020 | 0.562 |
Joe and Gene head to Milwaukee to see Gene's sons put on a fashion show. Notes: Double-length episode.
| 21 | 12 | "Joe Pera Shows You How to Pack a Lunch" | Marty Schousboe | Joe Pera | January 31, 2020 | 0.583 |
Joe shows the audience how to pack a lunch, but it only takes two minutes, so Joe tells the story of how Mike made up with Sue and how he got sprayed by a skunk.
| 22 | 13 | "Joe Pera Talks with You on the First Day of School" | Marty Schousboe | Marty Schousboe | January 31, 2020 | 0.509 |
Joe returns to school after summer break.

=== Special (2020) ===
| No. overall | No. in season | Title | Directed by | Original release date | US viewers (millions) |
|---|---|---|---|---|---|
| 23 | 1 | "Relaxing Old Footage with Joe Pera" | Marty Schousboe | May 20, 2020 (YouTube); May 22, 2020 (TV) | 0.496 |
Joe Pera narrates stories over a combination of unused footage from seasons one and two of the series, and stock footage. Features the song "Your Dog" by Advance Base. Notes: 30 minute special.

=== Season 3 (2021) ===
| No. overall | No. in season | Title | Directed by | Written by | Original release date | US viewers (millions) |
|---|---|---|---|---|---|---|
| 24 | 1 | "Joe Pera Sits with You" | Marty Schousboe | Nathan Min and Joe Pera | November 8, 2021 | 0.168 |
Joe helps Gene decide which chair he should purchase as his retirement chair. Joe thinks about all of his sitting options in his home.
| 25 | 2 | "Joe Pera Shows You How to Build a Fire" | Marty Schousboe | Conner O'Malley and Marty Schousboe | November 8, 2021 | 0.129 |
Sarah has an overwhelming feeling something bad is going to happen, so she and Joe head out to the woods to camp, and talk about her past.
| 26 | 3 | "Joe Pera Shows You His Second Fridge" | Marty Schousboe | Dan Licata | November 15, 2021 | 0.234 |
Joe has the intention to share the benefits of the traditional mid-west second fridge, but these plans are thwarted by local youths. Joe has a run in with Nicole Melsky in class.
| 27 | 4 | "Joe Pera Listens to Your Drunk Story" | Marty Schousboe | Katie Dolan and Jo Firestone | November 15, 2021 | 0.221 |
Sue Melsky invites Sarah to a friend's house for wine night. Sarah recounts the night to Joe as he makes them pierogis.
| 28 | 5 | "Joe Pera Discusses School-Appropriate Entertainment with You" | Marty Schousboe | Dan Licata | November 22, 2021 | 0.143 |
Joe wants to congratulate his class on a first semester well done with a movie, but struggles to find something new. He ponders why certain professions have political leans.
| 29 | 6 | "Joe Pera Takes You for a Flight" | Marty Schousboe | Joe Pera | November 22, 2021 | 0.130 |
The Melsky boys invite Joe to fly their drone, but only because they needed a driver as Mike has recently gotten a DUI. Joe shows Sara his footage from the drone and they try to contact people on her ham radio.
| 30 | 7 | "Joe Pera Shows You How to Keep Functioning in Mid-Late Winter" | Marty Schousboe | Nathan Min | December 6, 2021 | 0.184 |
Joe schedules his days full of activities to beat the winter blues, including a stop by Gene's where he is mesmerized by a video he put together. Sarah goes skiing with Sue Melsky and her friends and ends up getting into a fight about politics. After she gets into an accident the ladies come to her assistance and show that friendships can withstand disagreements.
| 31 | 8 | "Joe Pera Talks with You About Legacy" | Marty Schousboe | Jo Firestone & Conner O'Malley | December 6, 2021 | 0.159 |
An open house is scheduled for Nana's house, which is too much for Joe to handle, so he goes to the Melskys' to watch the NFL playoffs, to distract himself.
| 32 | 9 | "Joe Pera Builds a Chair with You" | Marty Schousboe | Katie Dolan and Marty Schousboe | December 13, 2021 | 0.174 |
Joe builds his chair, but can't stop thinking about Gene's 100-year plan. Sarah is down in the dumps after another accident. Joe makes a decision about what to do with the funds he received from selling his Nana's house. Notes: Double-length episode

== Reception ==
Joe Pera Talks with You has received critical acclaim, with much of the praise going towards the show's unique tone and writing. On the review aggregator website Rotten Tomatoes, the first season has an approval rating of 100% with an average rating of 8/10 based on 6 reviews. In a 4/5 stars review for Common Sense Media, Martin Brown noted the subversiveness of Pera's character, noting, "the socially awkward comedian/host is a recognizable type at this point. The twist here is that [...] instead of his social awkwardness getting him into trouble or making him the butt of the joke, it's merely the surface of a thoughtful, confident character who knows who he is. [...] The result is a sweet, thoughtful comedy about the small joys of everyday life."

The A.V. Club's Erik Adams writes that "It's a particular type of funny, of the soft-spoken, deadpan, and disarming type that Pera practices onstage and on the talk-show circuit. It's one of his many gifts as a performer, the way his understated wardrobe, deliberate delivery, and nervous body language set an expectation for awkwardness, before Pera pulls the rug out from under the audience with the confidence of his pacing and the precision of his writing." Indiewire's Steve Greene gave the second season an A− and wrote "This is nice. There's no irony, no rug pull, no cynicism in what he says. Just one person grateful for something that hasn't even arrived yet. That's the show in a nutshell: a chronicle of a guy so enthusiastic about the tiny pleasures of life that he's even happy about potential things". Josh Terry of Vice hailed the show as an "essential salve against cynicism: It's relaxing and gentle TV that revels more in its meditative beauty than its eccentric comedy".

=== Cancellation ===
The show's cancellation drew eulogies and tributes from critics. In announcing the cancellation, Polygon's Ethan Warren acclaimed the show as "a deft three-act exploration of joy, terror, grief, and love", and as the "handbook for navigating compounding crises. As long as there are chairs, and the people to sit on them, there must be hope". Writing for Collider, Chase Hutchinson emphasized on the uniqueness of the show up until the last season: "While his appearance is aggressively ordinary, Pera made something that was truly and brilliantly one-of-a-kind. To even try to compare it to anything feels impossible as, even when it played around with genre and poked fun at itself, it remains an enigmatic work all its own that felt like it was still evolving". And, in a tribute for The Ringer titled 'Joe Pera Talks With You': In Praise of Joy, Tyler Parker honored the show as "the anti-cringe" of comedy, adding, "If cringe comedy is the theater of the uncomfortable—crank up tension, break with laughter, repeat—then consider Joe Pera Talks With You the anti-cringe. A warm blanket of a comedy. Mellow, joyful, and good-hearted".
