= Wishful Thinking (2026 film) =

Upcoming film by Graham Parkes

- Directed by: Graham Parkes
- Written by: Graham Parkes
- Produced by: Lewis Pullman; Matt Smith; Kara Durrett; Dan Gedman
- Starring: Maya Hawke; Lewis Pullman; Randall Park; Jake Shane; Amita Rao
- Cinematography: Christopher Ripley
- Edited by: Lilly Wild
- Music by: Oliver Lewin
- Production companies: Highway 10; Buckwild; Pinky Promise
- Distributed by: Sony Pictures Classics
- Release dates: March 12, 2026 (SXSW); February 12, 2027 (United States)
- Running time: 105 minutes
- Country: United States
- Language: English
- Budget: $3 million

Wishful Thinking is a 2026 American romantic comedy fantasy film written and directed by Graham Parkes in his feature directorial debut. The film stars Maya Hawke, Lewis Pullman, Randall Park, Jake Shane, and Amita Rao.

Wishful Thinking premiered at the 2026 South by Southwest Film & TV Festival on March 12, 2026, where it won the Narrative Feature Competition Jury Prize. The film is scheduled to be theatrically released in the United States on February 12, 2027, by Sony Pictures Classics.

== Premise ==
Julia and Charlie, a volatile couple in Portland, Oregon, are at a loss for how to repair their broken relationship. Julia, an ambitious game designer, and Charlie, a struggling musician working in sound design to pay the bills, are pushed by Julia's friend into attending a couples-therapy seminar run by twin healers, the Tillies, who claim to fix relationships through energy work. The session triggers a karmic universal system that makes the state of their relationship affect the world around them. With earthquakes, the stock market, and entire nations at risk, Charlie and Julia confront whether their love can survive so much destruction.

== Cast ==
- Maya Hawke as Julia
- Lewis Pullman as Charlie
- Randall Park as Bobby
- Jake Shane as Jeff
- Amita Rao as Ella
- Eric Rahill as Milo
- Kate Berlant as the Tillies
- Kerri Kenney-Silver as Charlie’s mother
- Mat Wright as Arsen
- Jon Hamm as himself

== Production ==
The film is written and directed by Graham Parkes. It is produced by Highway 10, Buckwild, and Pinky Promise, with Matt Smith and Dan Gedman producing for Highway 10, Lewis Pullman producing for his company Buckwild, and Kara Durrett for Pinky Promise.

Pullman leads the cast alongside Maya Hawke, with Randall Park, Jake Shane, Amita Rao, Eric Rahill, Kate Berlant, and Kerri Kenney-Silver. Principal photography took place in August 2025. Filming locations included Portland, Oregon. Creative agency Nemo Design served as the location of the film's fictional gaming company Nemo VR.

== Release ==
Wishful Thinking had its world premiere at the 2026 South by Southwest Film & TV Festival on March 12, 2026, where it won the Narrative Feature Competition Jury Prize. In May 2026, Sony Pictures Classics acquired distribution rights to the film, later scheduling it for a theatrical release in the United States on February 12, 2027.
