= Let's Start a Cult =

Let's Start A Cult
- Directed by: Ben Kitnick
- Written by: Ben Kitnick; Stavros Halkias; Wes Haney
- Produced by: RoseMary Prodonovich; Josh Hunnicutt; Greg Newman
- Starring: Stavros Halkias; Wes Haney; Daniel Simonsen; Scotty Nelson; Zuri Salahuddin; Eric Rahill; Katy Fullan; Joe Pera; Tom Papa; Robert Kelly; Ethan Suplee; Phil Brooks
- Cinematography: Jason Chiu
- Edited by: Tynan DeLong
- Music by: Joseph Stevens
- Production company: Queensbury Pictures
- Distributed by: Dark Sky Films
- Release date: October 25, 2024
- Running time: 90 minutes
- Country: United States
- Language: English
- Budget: <$1,000,000

Let's Start A Cult is a 2024 comedy film directed by Ben Kitnick and co-written by Kitnick, Stavros Halkias, and Wes Haney. Halkias and Haney star in the film along with Katy Fullan, Eric Rahill, and Daniel Simonsen.

The movie was released theatrically by Dark Sky Films on October 24th, 2024. Following its theatrical run, Let's Start A Cult was acquired by Hulu and released by the streaming service on February 4th, 2025.

== Plot ==
In 2000, a cult led by William Davenport records a series of video interviews and then commits mass suicide. Chip Harper, an obese, crass cult member, is made to sleep in a barn with no electricity and a makeshift raccoon trap. On the day of their "transcendence," their celebration of it is ruined by Chip's antics, and as punishment, he is tasked to deliver the videotape to the press. Failing to do so, Chip returns to find the group dead on the floor, having completed the ritual without him.

Three months later, Chip is living with his parents while working for his father's company selling gravel. He learns on the news that the bodies of his former cult have been discovered, except for William, who is thought to be alive and is wanted for murder. After investigating, Chip manages to track down his former leader and finds him working as a clown at children's birthday parties. When Chip confronts him, William claims he died but was resurrected for the sole purpose of reconnecting with Chip so that they may start a new cult.

Chip begins to act as a clown-in-training with William, as they devise a plan to make money and begin to recruit new members. After a disastrous performance, they hit the road and find a U.S. Army recruitment office. Outside, they meet Tyler, a young man who was rejected from the military for a bone disorder. They also meet Diane, a mentally unhinged single mother who is not allowed to see her son, at a conference in a hotel. William promises the new group that he will take them to a new compound, where they will start a new life together.

Along the way, William finds Chip taking charge and leading the group in ways he does not approve of. While he is asleep, Chip recruits a foreign musician named Jim Smith and takes the group camping. When they finally arrive at the new compound, William discovers that the house he was set to inherit is instead owned by Dorota, a former women's wrestling champion. He tells the group and gives up on starting a cult before Chip confronts the woman himself. After the two start flirting, they have passionate sex, and she allows the group to stay with her at the house. William dubs Chip the new leader of the cult and records the group worshiping him.

William leaves in the night and claims to authorities that he is an escaped cult member and that Chip has been the true mastermind behind the cult. Dorota fights off police officers, and the rest of the group escapes. After an argument, Chip attempts to drown himself but is saved by Jim, Diane, and Tyler. They set out to find the original tape with the cult's statements to clear Chip's name and out William as the leader. The group goes to the old compound only to find William in the middle of an interview with a TV station news reporter. Chip uncovers the original tape in the barn and shows it to the reporter. William then grabs a pair of pruning shears and puts them to the reporter's neck, threatening to kill her if they do not destroy the tape. Suddenly, William steps on Chip's raccoon trap, and a machete falls from the ceiling into the top of his head. Chip laughs and mocks William as he falls forward.

In a montage, we learn that Chip becomes a motivational speaker. He marries Dorota while she is in prison, and they have a child together. Diane begins dating Tyler and is allowed to see her son again. The group live together at Dorota's house as a family. William has survived his injury but has "shit for brains."

== Cast ==
- Stavros Halkias as Chip Harper, a foul-mouthed and clumsy cult member
- Wes Haney as William Davenport, the leader of a UFO doomsday cult
- Katy Fullan as Diane, a mentally unhinged single mother
- Eric Rahill as Tyler, a military-reject who's in denial about an unrequited love
- Daniel Simonsen as Jim Smith, a hitchhiking guitar player with a checkered past
- Sarafina Vecchio as Dorota, a hairdresser and former women's wrestler
- Ethan Suplee as Cody Harper, Chip's brother
- Robert Kelly as Del Harper, Chip's father and owner of a gravel selling company
- Sarah Charipar as Teri Harper, Chip's mother
- Phil Brooks as Robbie
- Clare O'Kane as Frances
- Edy Modica as Kathleen
- Scotty Nelson as Gabriel
- Leslie Zang as Elizabeth
- Nathan Min as Jefferson
- Jeanne Sparrow as Georgeanne
- Joe Pera as Bo
- Tom Papa as News Anchor

== Production ==
Director and co-writer Ben Kitnick had the initial idea for the film's story and wrote it as a short film that he brought to comedian Stavros Halkias. Kitnick wrote and directed the short version Exit Statement in 2019, which served as the basis for the movie. Halkias and Kitnick expanded the short to feature-length, co-writing the script with comedian Wes Haney over the course of six months-to-a-year. The trio received a small budget from producer Queensbury Pictures and Dark Sky Films, a company mostly known for making horror films. Because of the lack of comedy movies produced by major studios in recent years, Halkias and company chose to make the movie independently. The movie was made on a budget of less than a million dollars. Halkias was inspired by comedies about confident idiots like Billy Madison, The Foot Fist Way, Eastbound and Down, and Will Ferrell's movies. Halkias said he had no acting training beyond an after school program in the sixth grade.

Let's Start A Cult was filmed in three weeks under its original title, Exit Statement, in the summer of 2023. Stavros Halkias mentioned its budget being below a million dollars.

== Release ==
The movie was released theatrically by Dark Sky Films on October 24th, 2024 and on Hulu on February 4th, 2025.
