= Vidiots =

Video store in Los Angeles

Coordinates: 34.1351°N 118.2152°W

The Vidiots Foundation
- "Vidiots"
- Interactive map of The Vidiots Foundation
- Address: 4884 Eagle Rock Blvd; Los Angeles; US
- Type: Video rental store, indoor movie theater

Construction
- Opened: Est. 1985

Website
- vidiotsfoundation.org

Vidiots is an independent non-profit video rental store in Los Angeles, California.

== History ==
Vidiots was founded by Cathy Tauber and Patricia Polinger in 1985. The original Vidiots location was based in Santa Monica and featured a library consisting of 800 titles.

Throughout the 90s and early 2000s, Vidiots distinguished themselves from larger video rental store chains, such as Blockbuster, by featuring obscure and niche titles, including several VHS that were never made into DVDs, and movies which were out of print entirely.

While experiencing a steady increase in cinephile customers, Vidiots expanded their programming to include a series of film-related events, including screenings, small festivals for local filmmakers, speaker spotlights, etc. Vidiots' video library increased to 50,000 titles by the 2010s.

At the encouragement and assistance of filmmaker David O. Russell, Vidiots became a non-profit organization in 2012, Vidiots Foundation. Their stated mission was to "preserve, protect and educate," about the history of film and the various kinds of filmmaking.

In 2016, Vidiots recognized Harry Dean Stanton with their inaugural Harry Dean Stanton Award. The award recognizes a member of the film community whose body of work has helped define or impact American cinema. That same year, Vidiots raised close to $60,000 in a crowdfunding campaign on Indiegogo to bring "video store culture into the next era."

In 2017, Vidiots closed after struggling to maintain itself with the increase in streaming platforms and viewership, but eventually re-opened.

== Reopening and present day ==
During its interim years without a physical location, the Vidiots Foundation partnered with other existing independent theaters to maintain its organization. The foundation collaborated on programming with Bootleg Theater, Alamo Drafthouse, UCLA Film & Television Archive, Rooftop Cinema Club and the Theatre at the Ace Hotel.

In 2020, Vidiots began a fundraising campaign to raise money for its storefront reopening.

In 2021, Play-PerView staged a presentation of Bill Corbett's play, The Medievalists, starring Jason Ritter, Paget Brewster, James Urbaniak, and Rhea Seehorn, proceeds for which went to Vidiots. The Vidiots foundation received the 2021-2022 Hollywood Foreign Press Association Grant for promoting "cultural exchange through film." The foundation also received a National Association of Theatre Owners grant in 2022 and partnered with A24 in auctions, benefits for which went to the Vidiots' campaign.

When Vidiots re-opened its doors in 2023 at a new location, the former Eagle Theater in Eagle Rock, Los Angeles. it resumed its full program of screenings of repertory titles and cult favorites. The Vidiots storefront maintains a collection of 70,000 DVD, Blu-ray and rare VHS tapes, which are available for rental.

In 2025, Vidiots celebrated its 40th anniversary with screenings of a films from its flagship year, 1985, paired with special guests such as director Dan Gilroy and actor Michael McKean, and a one-night-only comedy show starring Kumail Nanjiani, Ike Barinholtz, Mary Elizabeth Ellis, Emily V. Gordon, and Timothy Simons.
