= Townsends =

American YouTube channel

YouTube information
- Channel: Townsends
- Genre: History
- Subscribers: 2.92 million
- Views: 470 million
- Last updated: January 10th, 2026
- Website: townsends.us

Townsends is an American educational YouTube channel created and hosted by Jon Townsend. Originally a channel to advertise items for sale from the family's brick and mortar historical reenactment supply store in Pierceton, Indiana, Townsends has become known for its historical mini-documentaries. The channel covers a wide range of different aspects of 18th- and 19th-century living, especially recipes from the time period.

== History ==
In the late 1960s and early 1970s, James Townsend collected historical rifles. He organized and frequented historical reenactment and muzzleloading events, and subsequently had the idea to sell supplies to other enthusiasts. In 1973, he created a family business in Pierceton, Indiana which manufactures and sell clothes, cooking equipment, and accessories accurate to the 18th and 19th centuries. Since 1995, the business has been run by James's son, Jon Townsend. Items from the store have appeared in several films and television shows, including Turn: Washington's Spies, Curb Your Enthusiasm, The Greatest Showman, and the Pirates of the Caribbean series.

== YouTube channel ==
In 2009, Jon Townsend created a YouTube channel to advertise the items for sale on the business's website. The channel's first video was a demonstration of the company's American Revolutionary War coats. The channel later shifted to creating mini-documentary historical content. Today, the channel has published hundreds of videos about a wide range of different aspects of 18th- and 19th-century life, such as log cabin building, cleaning laundry, and cooking historical recipes in an 18th-century replica kitchen. Most of the channel's videos are focused on cooking historical recipes. The recipes used by Townsends are referenced from historical primary sources such as The Art of Cookery Made Plain and Easy. Townsends has featured a 1784 recipe for macaroni and cheese; other presentations include coffee mixed with eggs, and fried deer heart.
