= Conner O'Malley =

American comedian (born 1986)

- O'Malley in 2025
- Born: December 20, 1986 (age 39); Des Plaines, Illinois, U.S.
- Occupations: Comedian; actor; writer; filmmaker
- Spouse: Aidy Bryant (m. 2018)
- Writing career
- Years active: 2013–present

YouTube information
- Channel: Conner O'Malley
- Years active: 2006–present
- Subscribers: 316 thousand
- Views: 27 million
- Last updated: November 8, 2025
- Website: endorphinport.com

Conner O'Malley (born December 20, 1986) is an American comedian, actor, writer, and filmmaker. He has appeared in Broad City, Joe Pera Talks with You, and I Think You Should Leave with Tim Robinson, and produces videos on YouTube. For his work on Late Night with Seth Meyers, he received three Writers Guild of America Awards nominations.

== Early life ==
O'Malley was born on December 20, 1986, in Des Plaines, Illinois, a suburb of Chicago. His grandparents were Irish immigrants, and he later acquired Irish citizenship. He grew up on Chicago's North Side and has two older brothers. His father, brothers, and several uncles were all elevator mechanics, which his father wanted him to also pursue; O'Malley, who did not want to do so, purposely failed the test to become one at the age of 18. He then wanted to be a comedian, inspired by Conan O'Brien and Norm Macdonald.

== Career ==
O'Malley started frequently performing in the standup and improv comedy scene at Second City theaters in Chicago. Performing at the Annoyance Theatre, he met his future wife, Aidy Bryant. When Bryant was cast on Saturday Night Live in 2012, the two moved to New York City, where O'Malley began uploading short comedy videos to the social media platform Vine while working as a dog walker. His Vines, uploaded until the site shut down defunct in 2017, mostly showed him confronting drivers on New York City streets and talking to them in non-sequiturs. The videos were profiled by Alex Naidus in BuzzFeed in 2013.

O'Malley's videos quickly began to gain attention and acclaim, and in 2014, he was hired as a writer for Late Night with Seth Meyers. While writing for Late Night, he occasionally performed on the show and created several re-occurring characters including "Anniversary Guy", "Stink Mouth PigMan", and "Gørbøn Hausinfrud".

In addition to Late Night, O'Malley has written for Joe Pera Talks with You, which he also co-starred in as Joe's neighbor Mike Melsky; and the 66th Primetime Emmy Awards. As an actor, he has been featured in several television shows, most notably Detroiters, on Comedy Central playing Trevor, Tim's free-wheeling brother; and the web series Horace and Pete, in the role of Eric, the boyfriend of Horace's daughter, played by Bryant. O'Malley has also appeared on Comedy Central's Broad City, on Netflix's The Characters, and has been a recurring guest on The Chris Gethard Show. In 2019, he appeared on I Think You Should Leave with Tim Robinson on Netflix. In 2021, he appeared on HBO's That Damn Michael Che. Since 2016, O'Malley has also frequently posted videos on his YouTube channel, similar to his Vine work. In 2023, he began pay-per-view selling his videos on his own website Endorphin Port.

In 2024, O'Malley released the stand-up comedy special Stand Up Solutions, which satirizes late capitalism and artificial intelligence. Filmed in Brooklyn, the special received critical acclaim, with Tim Marcin of Mashable describing it as "a scathing critique of our AI reality" and Clare Martin of Paste calling it a "fever dream, frantically reflecting our own overwhelming, tumultuous present while still keeping us in stitches".

O'Malley co-directed (with Danny Scharar), wrote, and starred in Rap World, a 2024 mockumentary about three men in Tobyhanna, Pennsylvania, in 2009, who try to record a hip-hop album over the course of a night, despite "having no songs or real focus to speak of", as David Renshaw writes for The Fader. The film is shot with a period-accurate video camera and is edited like a YouTube vlog from that time. Renshaw referred to Rap World as being the funniest film of 2024.

== Style ==
O'Malley publishes comedy videos on YouTube and Twitter. These include vlogs from various characters of his, such as a right-wing news show which parodies InfoWars and its host Alex Jones. Jeremy Gordon, writing for The Outline, said that "O'Malley contorts himself into the persona of a deeply unpleasant person like few other comedians". His characters often have a manic and aggressive persona, speak with loose thoughts, and have a comically overzealous interest in politics and popular culture. Shane Ryan, writing for Paste, said his comedy expresses "anger and envy and a sort of perverted worship of wealth and the American dream". Chloe Lizotte wrote for Reverse Shot (the publication of the Museum of the Moving Image) that his work "mock[s] the idea that commercial entertainment could stand in for political action or fill a spiritual void", and compared his videos to the documentary films of Adam Curtis.

Over two months in 2019, O'Malley uploaded a series of satirical videos centred on 2020 U.S. presidential election candidates, Howard Schultz (the CEO of Starbucks) and then-U.S. representative Beto O'Rourke. Jeremy Gordon described the series as "performance art", and Chloe Lizotte used it to show how O'Malley's work frequently switches between different styles of filmic storytelling. In these videos, O'Malley plays a "deranged, diehard" fan of Schultz and O'Rourke's campaigns, who has an unusual outfit, many unexplained bodily injuries, and an addiction to nondescript pills. At the start of the series, the character stands at a construction site and yells compliments at the two candidates in personal messages to them recorded with his phone. He then gets kidnapped and tortured in a van by representatives of Starbucks—the camera switching to the kidnapper's perspective, shot like a snuff film—until he is released into the public. At a shopping mall, filmed like a normal narrative film, O'Malley's character tells strangers that Howard Schultz "made me normal". Lizotte wrote that this character and many others of O'Malley's are "socially aloof" people who "navigate a world corroded by mediation", similar to Charlie Chaplin or Jacques Tati's characters but within the "contemporary American hellscape".

== Personal life ==
While performing at Chicago's Annoyance Theatre in 2008, O'Malley met and began dating fellow comedian Aidy Bryant. They became engaged in 2016 and married on April 28, 2018.

== Filmography ==
=== Film ===
Year	Title	Role	Notes
2020	Palm Springs	Randy	
2022	Bodies Bodies Bodies	Max	
2024	I Saw the TV Glow	Dave	
2024	Rap World	Matt	Also director and writer
2024	Stand Up Solutions	Richard Eagleton	Also writer
2024	Friendship	Patton	
2025	Maddie's Secret	Zach	

=== Film shorts ===
Year	Title	Role	Notes
2017	TruthHunters	Mark Seevers	Also writer
2021	Endorphin Port	Narrator	Also writer
2023	The Mask	Tyler Joseph	Also director and writer
2024	Coreys	Corey	Also writer
2025	Slugs	Narrator	Also director and writer
2025	Pipe Rock Theory	Kevin Podcast	Also director and writer
2026	Irish Zionism	Cyst O'Donovan	Also director and writer

=== Television ===
Year	Title	Role	Notes
2013–2014	The Chris Gethard Show	Various	Recurring, 9 episodes
2014	Louie	Young Louie	Episode: "Elevator: Part 4"
2014–2016	Late Night with Seth Meyers	Various	Recurring, Also writer
2015	The Awesomes	(Voice)	Recurring, 2 episodes
2015	Broad City	Chris	Episode: "St. Mark's"
2015–2016	The Special Without Brett Davis	Various	Recurring, 3 episodes
2016	Horace and Pete	Eric	Episode #1.7
2016	Netflix Presents: The Characters	Pointer Brother	Episode: "Tim Robinson"
2017	At Home with Amy Sedaris	Guanog	Episode: "Out of This World"
2018	Detroiters	Trevor	Episode: "Trevor"
2018	The Shivering Truth	(Voice)	Episode: "The Magmafying Past"
2018–2021	Joe Pera Talks with You	Mike Melsky	Co-star, also writer, executive producer
2019–2023	I Think You Should Leave with Tim Robinson	Various	Recurring, 4 episodes
2020	Search Party	Chris	Episode: "A National Affair"
2020–2021	Shrill	Reggie	Recurring, 4 episodes
2021	How To with John Wilson		Writer for second season
2021–2023	Teenage Euthanasia	Various	3 episodes
2025	Smiling Friends	Silly Samuel (voice)	Episode: "Silly Samuel"
2025	The Chair Company	Pepperoni	2 episodes

=== Award shows ===
Year	Title	Role	Notes
2014	66th Primetime Emmy Awards	Himself	Also writer
