= You Wrote It, You Watch It =

- This logo graphic is displayed during the show's opening sequence.
- Presented by: Jon Stewart
- Starring: The State
- Country of origin: United States
- Original language: English

Original release
- Network: MTV
- Release: 1992 – 1993

You Wrote It, You Watch It is an MTV sketch comedy show that aired from 1992–1993. It was hosted by Jon Stewart and featured members of The State comedy troupe. The latter of whom starred in their own show on MTV following the cancellation of You Wrote It, You Watch It.

The State performed humorous sketch recreations of letters sent to the MTV offices by viewers, depicting outrageous stories and events from their daily lives, with introductions by Stewart.

An early example of crowdsourcing, the program relied on content submitted by viewers. The show only lasted one season before its cancellation. Jon Stewart would later quip, "You wrote it, you just didn't watch it!"

== Background/Development ==
By the late 1980s, MTV had begun moving away from its original format as a continuous music video channel due to declining ratings. In an effort to improve audience retention, MTV shifted its programming in the early 1990s to include reality shows. By the mid-1990s, non-music content had come to occupy a significant portion of the channel's schedule. The network's most consequential step in this direction came in 1992 with the premiere of The Real World, MTV's first reality program.

That same year, MTV released You Wrote It, You Watch It. Jon Stewart hosted the show. Before the series, he was an up-and-coming comedian who had been co-hosting Short Attention Span Theater on The Comedy Channel since 1990. The program also starred all 11 members of The State, a comedy troupe that had formed at New York University in the late 1980s. The members included Kevin Allison, Michael Ian Black, Robert Ben Garant, Todd Holoubek, Michael Jann, Kerri Kenney-Silver, Thomas Lennon, Joe Lo Truglio, Ken Marino, Michael Showalter and David Wain.

== Program Overview & Structure ==
You Wrote It, You Watch It is a half-hour sketch comedy program that adapts viewer-submitted letters into short comedic segments. The show is fast-paced in style, frequently punctuated by sound effects and clips from outside media. Its humor is notably crude and risqué, leaning into adult themes and irreverent presentation. The show consists of eight episodes, all organized around a theme, as the episode's title indicates. All sketches and letters featured for a given installment connect back to that central topic.

A typical episode follows a consistent structure. Stewart opens the show with a cold open introducing the episode's central theme, and a title card formalizes the theme. Then, the opening sequence plays, consisting of bright flashing colors and graphics and ending on a humorous disclaimer. The bulk of each episode consists of viewer mail segments, each beginning with a graphic identifying the letter-writer's name and location, followed by a dramatized sketch based on the letter's contents. Stewart serves as the show's host between segments, often adding commentary on the previous sketch or the episode's central theme. He returns at the end of the episode to close out the show, followed by credits.

Episode List
| Episode | Title |
| S1 Ep1 | "Modern Myths" |
| S1 Ep2 | "Holidays" |
| S1 Ep3 | "Dreams" |
| S1 Ep4 | "Bad Days" |
| S1 Ep5 | "Parents" |
| S1 Ep6 | "Jobs" |
| S1 Ep7 | "Groveling Towards Graduation" |
| S1 Ep8 | "Friends, Roommates, & Dogs" |

== Cancellation & Legacy ==
MTV cancelled You Wrote It, You Watch It after a single season. Referencing the show's low viewership, Stewart later remarked, "You wrote it, you just didn't watch it!" After the series ended, Stewart hosted The Daily Show, a half-hour political satire program on Comedy Central from 1999 to 2015.

The State went on to star in their own MTV series, also titled The State, which aired on the network from 1994 to 1995. The program directly impacted the troupe's popularity and mainstream appeal. The group's raunchy comedic style would go on to define Generation X-era cable comedy.

Members of the troupe subsequently collaborated on a number of television and film projects, including Viva Variety, Reno 911! and the Wet Hot American Summer franchise. Michael Showalter, Michael Ian Black and David Wain went on to form the sketch comedy group Stella, which had its own Comedy Central series in 2005. Joe Lo Truglio later joined the main cast of the NBC sitcom Brooklyn Nine-Nine, which ran from 2013 to 2021.
