= The State (comedy troupe) =

American comedy troupe

- Education: New York University
- Notable work: The State

Comedy career
- Years active: 1988–present
- Medium: Television
- Genres: Surreal humour; anti-humor; black comedy; farce; alternative comedy; sketch comedy; blue comedy / off-color
- Members: Kevin Allison; Michael Ian Black; Robert Ben Garant; Todd Holoubek; Michael Patrick Jann; Kerri Kenney-Silver; Thomas Lennon; Joe Lo Truglio; Ken Marino; Michael Showalter; David Wain

The State is an American comedy troupe. The troupe was founded by a group of New York University students in 1988, as an offshoot of the NYU improv comedy group The Sterile Yak; it was briefly named The New Group before landing on the name The State. The troupe's members are Kevin Allison, Michael Ian Black, Robert Ben Garant, Todd Holoubek, Michael Patrick Jann, Kerri Kenney-Silver, Thomas Lennon, Joe Lo Truglio, Ken Marino, Michael Showalter and David Wain. As a group, the troupe is best known for creating and starring in the 1993–1995 MTV sketch comedy series The State. However, since the show aired, members of the troupe have frequently collaborated on other television and film projects, including Viva Variety, Reno 911!, and the Wet Hot American Summer media franchise. The comedy group Stella is composed of three of The State's members, Showalter, Black and Wain, and starred in the 2005 sketch comedy series Stella, among other works. Additionally, some members of The State have achieved independent success as comic actors, writers and directors.

== Other works as a troupe ==
In 1996, the members of The State recorded an album, Comedy for Gracious Living, at Compass Point Studios for Warner Bros. It was shelved for unknown reasons. It was finally released in September 2010 by Rhino/Handmade via rhino.com. The 25-track release features cuts such as "Skip This Track (They Were Drunk)" and "Kerri's one Second Noise." With liner notes written by the troupe, the packaging is notable for having, perhaps, the longest printed booklet ever included in a CD package.

A book the group wrote, State By State with The State: An Uninformed, Poorly Researched Guide To Traveling In The United States, was published in April 1997. It is currently out of print.

A performance history on David Wain's website states that The State performed a full-length live show at the Big Stinkin' International Improv & Sketch Comedy Festival in Austin, Texas, on May 23, 1997.

The entire group appeared in the 2007 film The Ten, directed by David Wain, in some cases, in cameo appearances. On March 15, 2008, most of the troupe reunited for a special reunion sketch show at Upright Citizens Brigade Theatre in Los Angeles.

In 2008, the group attempted to reunite to make "a movie about American history" for Comedy Central, with the working title This American Sandwich. However, the attempt was derailed by the 2007–2008 Writers Guild of America strike. In 2023, Allison, Black, Jann, Silver, Lennon, Lo Truglio, Marino, and Wain reunited for a performance at the Paramount Theatre in Denver, Colorado. The show was dubbed the "Breakin’ Hearts & Dippin’ Balls Tour" and while initially planned as a one night only event, three additional performances were added on October 16, 17, and 18 and additional performances planned.

== Other collaborative works ==
| regular cast member | guest appearance | directed |

| Actor | Viva Variety | Random Play | Reno 911! | Reno 911!: Miami | Wet Hot American Summer | The Ten | Stella | Wainy Days | Role Models | Childrens Hospital | Party Down | Michael and Michael Have Issues | Burning Love | They Came Together | Wet Hot American Summer: First Day of Camp | Wet Hot American Summer: Ten Years Later | Gail Daughtry and the Celebrity Sex Pass |
|---|---|---|---|---|---|---|---|---|---|---|---|---|---|---|---|---|---|
| Thomas Lennon | X mark | | X mark | X mark | | Featured article | | Featured article | | Featured article | Featured article | | Featured article | | | | Featured article |
| Kerri Kenney | X mark | | X mark | X mark | Featured article | Featured article | | Featured article | Featured article | Featured article | Featured article | | Featured article | | Featured article | | Featured article |
| Michael Ian Black | X mark | X mark | Featured article | X mark | X mark | Featured article | X mark | Featured article | | | | X mark | X mark | Featured article | X mark | X mark | Featured article |
| Ben Garant | X mark | | X mark | / | | Featured article | | | | | | | | | | | |
| Joe Lo Truglio | Featured article | | X mark | Featured article | X mark | Featured article | Featured article | Featured article | Featured article | Featured article | Featured article | | X mark | | X mark | X mark | X mark |
| Kevin Allison | Featured article | | | Featured article | | Featured article | Featured article | | | | | | | | | | Featured article |
| Ken Marino | | | Featured article | Featured article | X mark | Featured article | Featured article | Featured article | Featured article | X mark | X mark | | / | Featured article | X mark | X mark | X mark |
| David Wain | | X mark | Featured article | Featured article | File page | / | X mark | X mark | File page | / | File page | | Featured article | / | File page | / | / |
| Michael Patrick Jann | | | File page | Featured article | | | | | | File page | | | | | | | |
| Michael Showalter | | X mark | | Featured article | X mark | Featured article | X mark | Featured article | | Featured article | | X mark | | Featured article | X mark | X mark | |
| Todd Holoubek | | | | Featured article | | Featured article | | | | | | | | | | | |

In addition, the following works involve two or more The State members:

- I Love the 70s, I Love the 80s & I Love the 90s - feature commentary from many State members, including Michael Ian Black, Michael Showalter and David Wain
- The Baxter (2005) - written and directed by Showalter, featuring Showalter, Wain, Black, Lo Truglio and Marino.
- Diggers (2006) - written by Marino (who appears in a supporting role), co-produced by Wain.
- Reaper (2007-2009) - features Black and Marino in supporting roles; one episode was directed by Jann.
- I Love You, Man (2009) - features Lennon and Lo Truglio in supporting roles.
- Wanderlust (2011) - directed by Wain, written and produced by Wain and Marino, and featuring roles by Marino, Kenney-Silver, Lo Truglio, Black, Showalter, and Wain.
- Brooklyn Nine-Nine (2013-2021) - featured Lo Truglio as a main cast member, and featured Marino in a several-episode guest arc.
- A Futile and Stupid Gesture (2018) - directed by Wain, and featuring Lennon, Lo Truglio, Kenney-Silver and Wain.
- Garant and Lennon are frequent screenwriting partners, having collaborated on the Night at the Museum trilogy, Balls of Fury, The Pacifier, Let's Go to Prison (also with Michael Patrick Jann), Taxi (2004) and Herbie: Fully Loaded.
- Dog Days - directed by Marino, featuring Lennon and Wain in supporting roles.
- History of the World, Part II - Lo Truglio, Wain and Marino appear together in a sketch in Episode 8.
