= Michael Patrick Jann =

American film and television actor, writer, and director

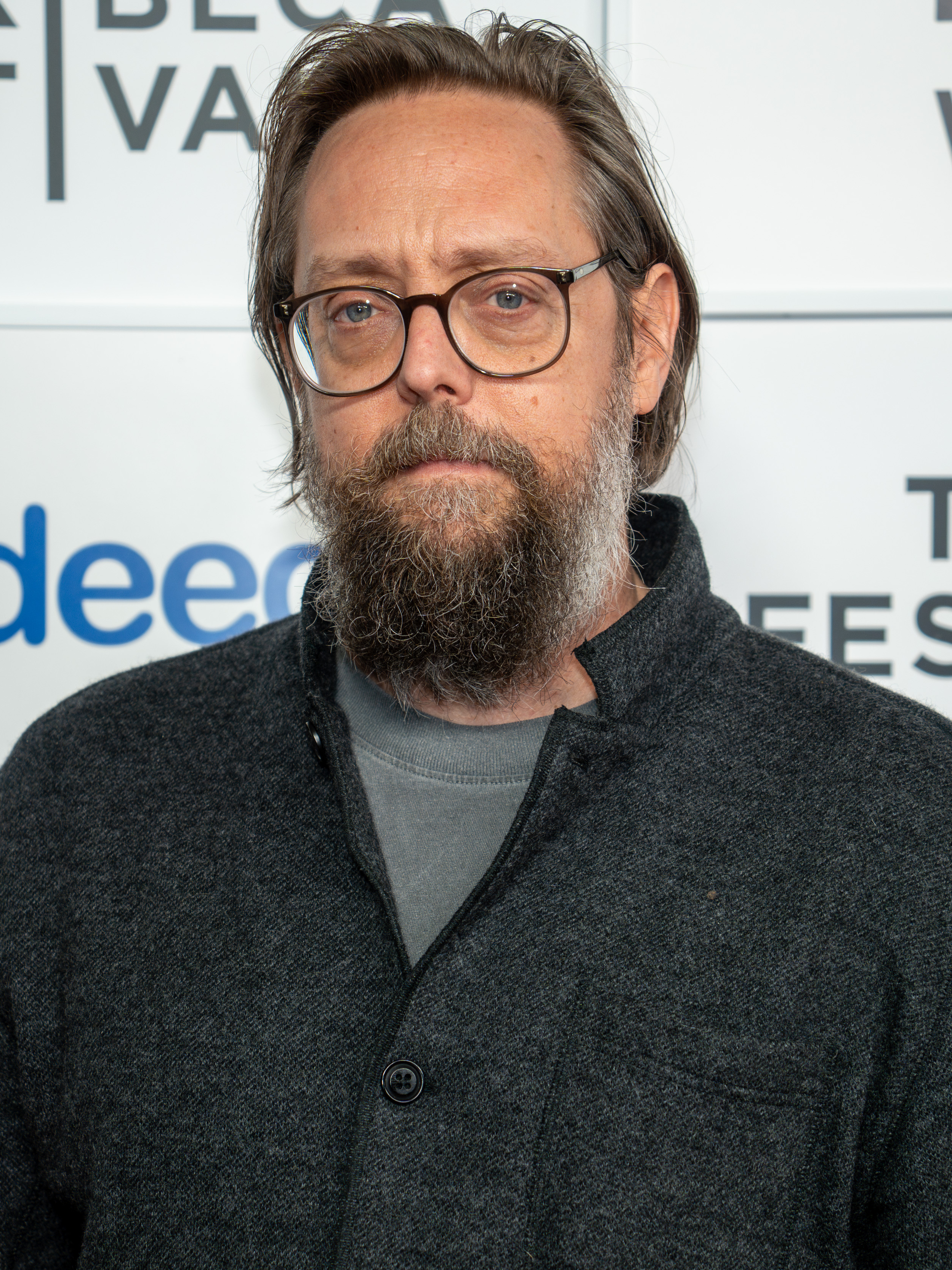
- Jann in 2025
- Born: May 15, 1970 (age 56); Albany, New York, U.S.
- Education: The Albany Academy
- Occupations: Actor; comedian; writer; director
- Years active: 1991–present
- Spouse: Lisa LoCicero (m. 2000)
- Children: 2

Michael Patrick Jann (born May 15, 1970) is an American actor, comedian, writer, and director best known as a cast member on MTV's The State.

== Career ==
Jann attended New York University, where, as a freshman, he joined the then-new comedy troupe The New Group, which was eventually renamed to The State. The troupe continued performing after college, and in 1993 they gained their own series on MTV, the sketch comedy show The State, which ran until 1995. Jann and David Wain directed a majority of the sketches on the series.

In 1999, Jann directed the film Drop Dead Gorgeous, which is his feature film directorial debut. Jann produced and directed many episodes of the 2003–2009 Comedy Central series Reno 911!, which was created by several members of The State. He co-wrote the 2006 film Let's Go to Prison, along with The State members (and Reno 911! cast members) Thomas Lennon and Robert Ben Garant. He directed most of the episodes of the 2008 HBO show Little Britain USA.

Jann has directed episodes of many other television comedy programs, including Community, Childrens Hospital, Crazy Ex-Girlfriend, Emily's Reasons Why Not, Flight of the Conchords, Friends with Benefits, Happy Endings, Notes from the Underbelly, Reaper, Suburgatory, Wedding Band and Daybreak.

Jann's other projects include the Western horror film Organ Trail, his second full-length feature, released in 2023.

== Personal life ==
Jann is married to soap opera actress Lisa LoCicero. The two have two children: a son, Lukas, born in 2001, and a daughter, Verity Marion, born in 2015.

== Filmography ==
- Drop Dead Gorgeous (1999)
- Bad News Mr. Swanson (2001)
- Emily's Reasons Why Not (2006)
- Most Likely to Succeed (2010)
- Ghosts/Aliens (2010)
- Brave New World (2011)
- El Jefe (2012)
- Grand Marquee (2015)
- I Shudder (2016)
- Organ Trail (2023)
- Alma and the Wolf (2025)
