= Mather Zickel =

American actor

Mather Zickel (born c. 1970) is an American actor, mainly known for comedy roles, as well as playing the character Kieran in Rachel Getting Married. A native of New York City, he has worked in both film and television since the late 1990s. He graduated from the Pomfret School in 1988 and New York University in 1992. He co-starred as "Rob the Federal Agent" in season two of Delocated and as Will Keen in the ABC sitcom Man Up!. He was also a recurring character in season 2 of Showtime's House of Lies and appeared in Masters of Sex. Other credits include films like The Ten and Wanderlust. He is a frequent collaborator of members of The State.

== Filmography ==
=== Film ===
Year	Title	Role	Notes
1998	Caught Up	Rocker	
2004	Achilles' Love	Ike	
2005	Molotov Samba	Jack Storm	
2005	In Between	Tommy	
2006	Wedding Daze	Guard	
2006	Diggers	Alan	
2007	Balls of Fury	Branch Director	
2007	The Ten	Louis La Fonda	
2008	Rachel Getting Married	Kieran	
2009	I Love You, Man	Gil	
2011	Fake	Loomis	
2011	Coming & Going	Simon	
2012	Wanderlust	Jim Stansel	
2015	Southbound	Lucas	
2016	Hail, Caesar!	Chunk Mulligan	
2017	How to Be a Latin Lover	James	
2017	Suburbicon	James	
2021	Let Us In	Harold Lutz	
2022	Babylon	Distribution Executive	
2023	Organ Trail	Pa	
2025	Alma and the Wolf	Ashley	
2025	The Fantastic Four: First Steps	Boston Newscaster	
2026	Gail Daughtry and the Celebrity Sex Pass	Niccolo	

=== Television ===
Year	Title	Role	Notes
2002	Gilda Radner: It's Always Something	Bill Murray	TV movie
2004	Arrested Development	Executive	Episode: "Meet the Veals"
2004–2007	Reno 911!	Mike Powers	Recurring cast, 7 episodes
2005	Stella	Hairy Chested Man	Episode: "Novel"
2006	Underfunded	Darryl Freehorn	TV movie
2007	The Bronx Is Burning	Lou Piniella	Episodes: "The Seven Commandments", "Mr. October"
2007–2008	Wainy Days	Waiter	Episodes: "The Date", "Shelly II"
2009	Cupid	Jack Kozkowski	Episode: "Left of the Dial"
2009	Royal Pains	Captain Brian	Episode: "Nobody's Perfect"
2009	The Karenskys	Bill Atwood	TV movie
2009	Party Down	Guy Stennislaus	Episode: "Sin Say Shun Awards Afterparty"
2010	Delocated	Rob the Federal Agent	Main cast, 11 episodes
2010–2012	Childrens Hospital	Louis La Fonda	Episodes: "The End of the Middle", "Newsreaders", "Eulogy"
2011–2012	Man Up!	Will Keen	Main cast, 13 episodes
2011	The Cape	Travis Hall	Recurring cast, 6 episodes
2013	House of Lies	Michael Carlson	Recurring cast, 6 episodes
2012	Burning Love	Brock	Episode: "Homeless No Mo'"
2013	Newsreaders	Louis La Fonda	Series regular
2013–2014	Bones	Aldo Clemens	4 episodes
2013–2015	Masters of Sex	George Johnson	Recurring cast, 6 episodes
2014	Mike & Molly	James	Episode: "Rich Man, Poor Girl"
2014	Elementary	Hank Prince	Episode: "The Hound of the Cancer Cells"
2014	Forever	Dr. Frederick Gardner	Episode: "Fountain of Youth"
2016	Dice		Episode: "Sal Maldonado"
2016	Law & Order: Special Victims Unit	John Valentine	Episode: "Assaulting Reality"
2016–2017	Younger	Dr. Richard Caldwell	Recurring cast, 9 episodes
2016–2020	Better Things	Sam's Ex	Episodes: "Sam/Pilot", "Period", "Hair of the Dog", "Phil", "New Orleans"
2017	Timeless	Richard Hart	Episode: "Public Enemy No. 1"
2017	I Love You, America	Man at Desk	Series regular
2018	iZombie	FURY Reporter	Episode: "And He Shall Be a Good Man"
2019	L.A.'s Finest	Romeo Dunn	2 episodes
2019	Veronica Mars	Calvin Linden	Episode: “Losing Streak”
2019	Daybreak	Louis Wheeler	Episode: "Josh vs. the Apocalypse: Part 2"
2019	Modern Family	Scooter	Episode: "A Game of Chicken"
2020	Dirty John		Episode: "Marriage Encounter"
2021	The Crew	Frank	3 episodes
2023	Raven's Home	Rafferty	Episodes: "European Rae-cation: Part 1", "European Rae-cation: Part 2"
2023–2024	Blue Bloods	Dr. Leonard Walker	3 episodes
