= Gail Daughtry and the Celebrity Sex Pass =

2026 film by David Wain

- Theatrical release poster
- Directed by: David Wain
- Written by: Ken Marino; David Wain
- Produced by: Anthony Bregman; Peter Cron; Ken Marino; David Wain; Crystine Zhang; Charles Zhong
- Starring: Zoey Deutch; John Slattery; Ken Marino; Miles Gutierrez-Riley; Ben Wang; Sabrina Impacciatore; Jon Hamm
- Cinematography: Kevin Atkinson
- Edited by: John Daigle
- Music by: Craig Wedren
- Production companies: Likely Story; Oval-5
- Distributed by: Sony Pictures Classics
- Release dates: January 25, 2026 (Sundance); July 10, 2026 (United States)
- Running time: 94 minutes
- Country: United States
- Language: English
- Box office: $1.5 million

Gail Daughtry and the Celebrity Sex Pass is a 2026 American comedy film directed by David Wain and written by Wain and Ken Marino.

The film premiered at the Sundance Film Festival on January 25, 2026, and was theatrically released in the United States on July 10, by Sony Pictures Classics. The film received positive reviews from critics.

== Plot ==
Gail Daughtry, a hairdresser in small-town Kansas, and her fiancé, Tom, are two weeks away from their wedding when they discuss their "celebrity sex pass"—the one celebrity they could sleep with without violating their relationship. Tom initially chooses Tilda Swinton, and Gail chooses Jon Hamm, but after meeting Jennifer Aniston at a book signing, Tom changes his choice. When Gail catches the two together, she leaves with her friend Otto for a hairdressing convention in Los Angeles.

In Los Angeles, Gail accidentally swaps briefcases with Ludovica, a criminal plotting to destroy the world's financial system. Ludovica sends her henchmen, Sergio and Niccolo, to recover the case and kill Gail. Gail is convinced by a talented psychic that she must sleep with Jon Hamm to save her relationship. Gail and Otto befriend aspiring talent agent Caleb, who loses his job at CAA after stealing Hamm's address.

The trio discover that "Weird Al" Yankovic bought Hamm's house and join forces with paparazzo Vincent and Hamm's Mad Men co-star John Slattery, who deduces that Hamm is staying at the Chateau Marmont. Hamm's security guard agrees to arrange a meeting if they can pitch Hamm a movie. Meanwhile, Gail discovers the briefcase contains classified government documents that could form the basis for a thrilling screenplay.

Sergio and Niccolo ambush the group, leading to a chase through the convention. Niccolo is killed while attempting to shoot Gail, and Gail and Otto are later kidnapped. Caleb, Vincent, and Slattery rescue them from an abandoned Western set, where they trade the documents for their safety. Double-crossed, Slattery dispatches Ludovica's remaining henchmen and Gail beats Ludovica to death.

The group return to Hamm's hotel to pitch their screenplay. Although Hamm rejects the screenplay, he admires the group's determination, allows Vincent to photograph him, gets Caleb rehired, and arranges a role in an upcoming film for Slattery. He also honors Gail's celebrity pass, and the two sleep together. Despite their connection, Gail returns to Kansas intending to marry Tom.

At the wedding, Gail realizes that she cannot go through with it after seeing the wider world. Jon Hamm arrives in a hot air balloon, declares his love to her, and proposes. Gail declines marriage, wanting to keep things casual after ending her long-term relationship. Jon agrees, and the two fly away together.

As the balloon flies off, the narrator Frank the mailman, comments on it and begins complaining about his life and how he was overcharged for his roof. In a post-credits scene, said roof repairman Scott Lindholme rebuts Frank, conceding the overcharging, but justifies it by accusing him of not informing him about a raccoon infestation in the house. He leaves his office just before he gets a call from Gail calling from the balloon saying she could see her house’s roof needs repair.

== Cast ==
Many of the film's characters mirror the core characters from The Wizard of Oz.
- Zoey Deutch as Gail Daughtry (Dorothy Gale)
- Jon Hamm as himself (Wizard of Oz)
- John Slattery as himself (The Cowardly Lion)
- Sabrina Impacciatore as Ludovica (The Wicked Witch of the West)
- Ben Wang as Caleb (The Scarecrow)
- Miles Gutierrez-Riley as Otto (Toto)
- Joe Lo Truglio as Sergio (The Winged Monkey)
- Mather Zickel as Niccolo (The Winged Monkey)
- Ken Marino as Vincent (The Tin Woodman)
- Tobie Windham as Terrence
- Fred Melamed as Frank the Mailman
- Michael Cassidy as Tom Soursap McNoodleman
- Michael Ian Black as Very Famous Star Maps Salesman
- Kerri Kenney-Silver as Psychic Journeys LLC Co-Owner Charlotte Manetti
- Richard Kind as Taxi Driver Stuart Fernie
- Thomas Lennon as King of the Whip Curl Remy Fontaine
- Toby Huss as Scott
- Kevin Allison as Hotel Front Desk Clerk Mark Shapiro
- Beth Dover as Chateau Desk Person Helena Bonham Carter
- Zac Oyama as Sunset Grandeur Hotel Bellman Steve Oyama
- David Wain as People Magazine Editor Teleman Greevis
- Jennifer Aniston as herself
- Henry Winkler as himself
- Elizabeth Banks as herself
- "Weird Al" Yankovic as himself
- Paul Rudd as himself, attending Gail's wedding
- Penn Jillette as himself
- Elizabeth Perkins as herself
- Robert Herjavec as himself

== Production ==
=== Development and writing ===
The screenplay for Gail Daughtry and the Celebrity Sex Pass was written by director David Wain and Ken Marino, longtime collaborators and members of the 1990s sketch troupe The State. According to Wain, the film's loose, "off the cuff" tone belies a tightly structured script, developed through multiple rewrites and table reads. The story borrows its narrative bones from The Wizard of Oz, with protagonist Gail Daughtry (Zoey Deutch) conceived as a near-reverse of Dorothy Gale, and her journey from Kansas to Los Angeles mirroring Dorothy's trip to Oz. Marino has said the supporting cast of Hollywood misfits—including Ben Wang's aspiring talent agent and Marino's own paparazzo character, Vincent—were each built around a variation of the Scarecrow, Tin Man, and Cowardly Lion, with their respective needs for a brain, heart, and courage.

Jon Hamm and his Mad Men co-star John Slattery, who both appear as satirical versions of themselves, were not consulted before the first draft was written, though Wain and Marino were confident in their participation due to prior friendships; Wain has said he lived with Hamm briefly before Mad Men premiered.

=== Filming ===
Principal photography took place in Los Angeles over a 21-day production schedule, a choice Wain and Marino specifically fought for given the film's Hollywood-set second half. Some portions of this film were filmed on Hollywood Boulevard. The film's opening scenes, set in Gail's fictional Kansas hometown of Willowbrook, were shot on a Los Angeles backlot. The production was edited by John Daigle at Wain's Los Angeles home, where the filmmakers held regular living-room screenings for friends and collaborators to test material. According to Marino, the film's first cut ran approximately 140 minutes before being trimmed down to roughly 90 minutes.

== Release ==
The film had its world premiere at the Sundance Film Festival on January 25, 2026. In February 2026, Sony Pictures Classics acquired distribution rights to the film, beating out companies including Republic Pictures, Lionsgate, and Vertical. The film had a theatrical release in the United States on July 10, 2026.

== Reception ==
On the review aggregator website Rotten Tomatoes, 78% of 148 critics' reviews are positive, with an average rating of 6.4/10. The website's consensus reads: "A daffy odyssey through Los Angeles that's given a lift by Zoey Deutch's peppy charisma, Gail Daughtry and the Celebrity Sex Pass gives permission to laugh without feeling guilty afterwards." Metacritic, which uses a weighted average, assigned the film a score of 67 out of 100, based on 29 critics, indicating "generally favorable" reviews.

Some critics, including Slant Magazine, noted the film's overt structural resemblance to The Wizard of Oz, arguing that its modern Hollywood setting functions mainly as a loose, satirical reimagining of the classic narrative framework, while still being anchored by Deutch's performance. Writing for TheWrap, critic Matt Donato praised the film as "dumb fun" in the best sense, calling it an "absurdly offbeat comedy and a breath of fresh air in a stale genre, driven by Zoey Deutch's wide-eyed comedic performance as the titular Gail."
