= Kevin Allison =

American comedian, writer and actor

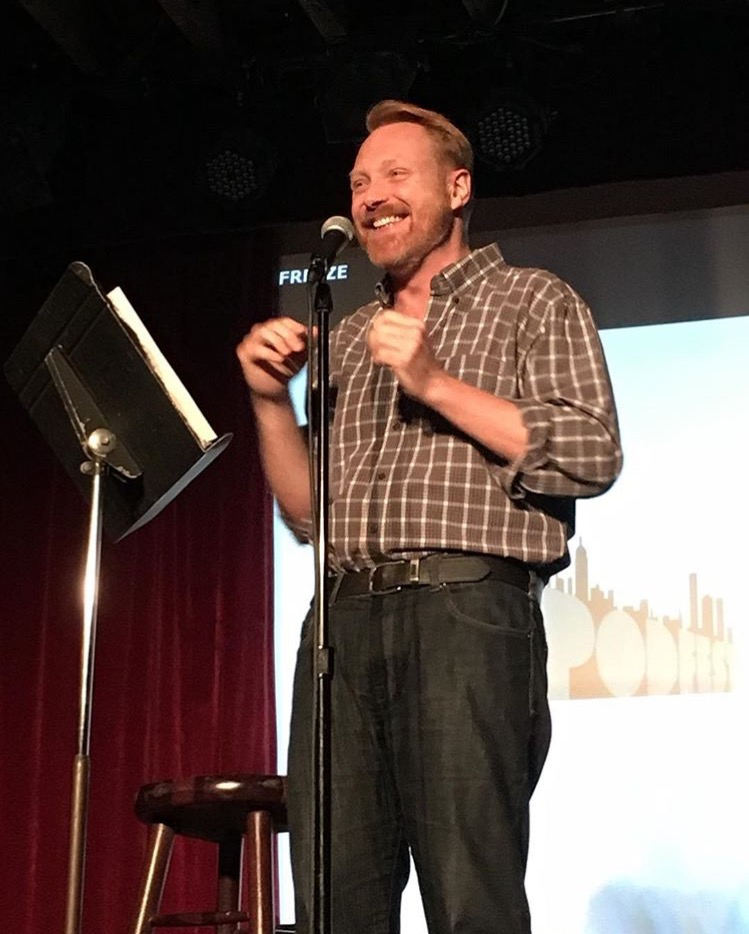
- Allison performing in 2017
- Born: February 16, 1970 (age 56); Cincinnati, Ohio, U.S.
- Occupations: Actor, comedian, writer, storyteller
- Years active: 1991–present
- Website: kevinallison.net

Kevin Allison (born February 16, 1970) is an American comedian, writer, actor, and storyteller. He is perhaps best known as a writing and performing member of the comedy troupe The State, and appeared in their 1993-1995 MTV sketch comedy series The State. He hosts a storytelling podcast, RISK!, and teaches sketch comedy and storytelling.

== Early life ==
Allison was born in Cincinnati, Ohio. He is a 1988 graduate of St. Xavier High School in Cincinnati. He then attended New York University, where he became a founding member of comedy troupe The State.

== Career ==
From 1993 to 1995, he appeared on the sketch comedy series The State. Popular sketches on the show starring Allison include "Taco Man," "Mr. Magina", "Dreamboy", and "The Jew, the Italian, and the Redhead Gay".

Allison created and hosts the uncensored weekly audio podcast RISK!, a storytelling show "where people tell true stories they never thought they'd dare to share." RISK! is also a monthly live show in New York City and Los Angeles. Allison tours to other cities with the show on a consistent basis as well. The live show debuted in August 2009 at Arlene's Grocery in New York and moved to Joe's Pub in October with guests like Margaret Cho, Rachel Dratch, Michael Ian Black, Andy Borowitz, and Janeane Garofalo dropping their usual material for a night to tell unusually honest and often embarrassing stories.

RISK! regularly ranks on the top ten lists of podcasts on iTunes and gets well over one million downloads per month. The podcast features both stories told at the live shows and studio-recorded "radio-style stories" with music and sound design. Allison's best known story from the podcast is "Kevin Goes to Kink Camp." In 2011, the RISK! team created the storytelling school The Story Studio based in New York. The school specializes in both creative and corporate storytelling training.

Allison's other film and TV appearances include Cobra Kai, High Maintenance, @midnight, Reno 911!: Miami, The Ten, Wedding Daze, VH1's Best Week Ever, IFC's Comedy Bang Bang and HBO's Flight of the Conchords, Viva Variety, The State on MTV and You Wrote It, You Watch It. He has written for TV and for production companies like JibJab and Blue Man Group.

Allison has taught sketch comedy and storytelling classes at New York University, the People's Improv Theater in New York City (where he also served as artistic director), and the Philly Improv Theater in Philadelphia. He currently teaches storytelling through his website and The Story Studio.

Allison is an advocate for the kink/BDSM community and has taught workshops on related topics.

== Media appearances ==
Allison appeared on podcasts including Marc Maron's WTF, Ken Reid's TV Guidance Counselor, Guys We Fucked, Las Culturistas, The Gist, My Brother, My Brother and Me, How to Be Amazing, and 2 Dope Queens.
