= VHYes =

- Film poster
- Directed by: Jack Henry Robbins
- Written by: Nunzio Randazzo; Jack Henry Robbins
- Produced by: Delaney Schenker
- Starring: Mason McNulty; Rahm Braslaw; Kerri Kenney-Silver; Thomas Lennon; Mark Proksch; Lo Mutac (Note: Credited as Charlyne Yi); Jake Head; Christian Drerup; Madeline Zima; Tim Robbins; Susan Sarandon
- Cinematography: Nate Gold
- Edited by: Avner Shiloah
- Distributed by: Oscilloscope Laboratories
- Release dates: September 21, 2019 (Fantastic Fest); January 12, 2020 (United States)
- Running time: 72 minutes
- Country: United States
- Language: English
- Box office: $47,037

VHYes is a 2019 American comedy film directed by Jack Henry Robbins, written by Nunzio Randazzo and Henry Robbins, produced by Delaney Schenker, and starring Mason McNulty.

== Plot ==
In 1987, a young boy named Ralph receives a VHS camcorder from his parents as a Christmas gift. Ralph quickly sets about filming his own explorations of the neighborhood, ersatz music videos with his best friend, and in particular recording late-night television to see what sort of programming comes on after he goes to bed. Unbeknownst to Ralph, the blank VHS he has chosen to use is, in fact, his parents' wedding video. The film is largely composed of sketches parodying 1980s late-night television, in particular infomercials, porn, and public access television. One particularly surreal talk show features a woman who theorizes that increasing use of VHS cameras will alter people's perception of reality, and thus reality itself. Throughout, snippets of Ralph's parents' wedding are shown, juxtaposed against vignettes Ralph captures documenting the slow deterioration of their marriage, including arguments and apparent infidelity on the part of Ralph's father.

Intrigued by a true crime program about a local sorority house fire, Ralph and his best friend sneak away from home on New Year's Eve to investigate the remains, where they encounter the ghost of a girl killed in the blaze. Trying to escape the building, Ralph discovers an antique television set and plugs the camera into it, transporting him within the world of his own VHS, which has begun to deteriorate. After meeting with several individuals from the various programs he's recorded, Ralph encounters a younger version of his mother. He asks her why she married his father if she would eventually grow so unhappy with him. Ralph's mother recounts a poignant memory from her wedding day by way of explaining their relationship. After she bids him goodbye, Ralph and his friend find themselves back in the sorority house; deciding they have had enough of VHS, they abandon the camera and return home.

== Cast ==
- Mason McNulty as Ralph
- Rahm Braslaw as Josh
- Kerri Kenney-Silver as Joan
- Juju Journey Brener as Little Girl
- Thomas Lennon as Tony V
- Mark Proksch as Teddy
- Lo Mutac (Note: Credited as Charlyne Yi) as Lou
- Courtney Pauroso as Cindy
- John Gemberling as Frank
- Cameron Simmons as Rico/Farmer Bud
- Tim Robbins as Sir Roger Handley III
- Nunzio Randazzo as Dr. Manly/Sheriff Cocker
- Jake Head as Ralph's Dad
- Christian Drerup as Ralph's Mom
- Raymond Lee as Todd Plotz
- Iyari Limon as Detective Jules
- Susan Sarandon as Tracy Beth
- Madeline Zima as Maiden #2

== Production ==
The film was shot entirely in VHS and Betacam.

== Reception ==
As of October 2021, the film holds a 79% approval rating on Rotten Tomatoes, based on 43 reviews with an average rating of 6.4/10. The website's critics consensus reads: "VHYes is a unique film for specific tastes -- and a rare, albeit grimy gift for viewers who can appreciate its retro aesthetic and absurd humor." Sandie Angulo Chen of Common Sense Media awarded the film two stars out of five. Clayton Dillard of Slant Magazine awarded the film one and a half stars out of four. Haleigh Foutch of Collider graded the film a B. A. A. Dowd of The A.V. Club graded it a C+. Nick Allen of RogerEbert.com gave the film one star. Tony Sokol of Den of Geek gave it four and a half stars out of five. Andy Crump of Paste rated it a 7.9. Lorry Kikta of Film Threat awarded the film a 10 out of 10.
