= Kerri Kenney-Silver =

American actress

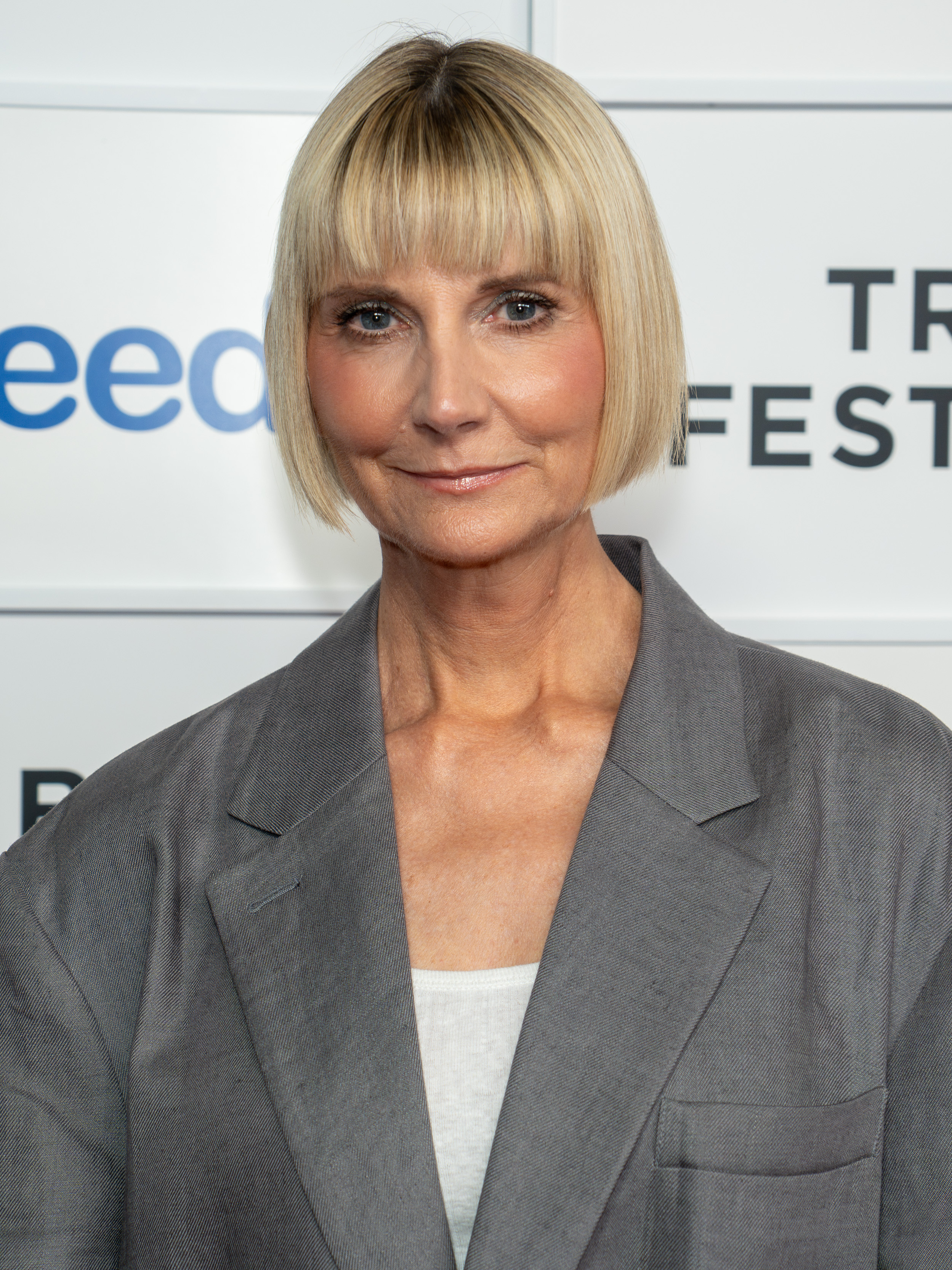
- Kenney-Silver in 2025
- Born: Kerri Kenney
- Occupations: Actress; comedian; writer; musician
- Years active: 1992–present
- Children: 1

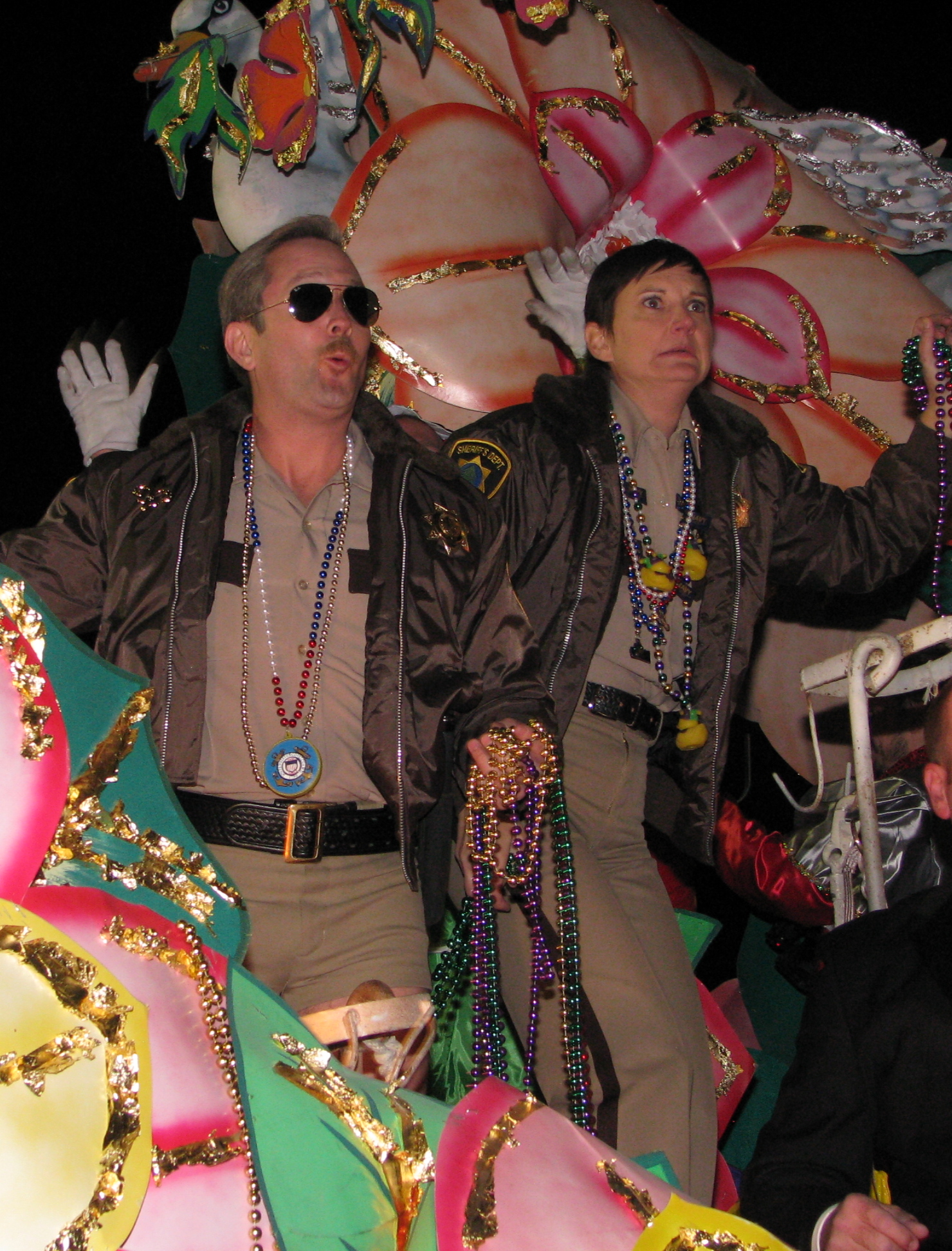
Kenney-Silver in character with Reno 911! co-star Thomas Lennon at Mardi Gras, New Orleans, 2009

Kerri Kenney-Silver is an American actress, comedian, writer, singer, and musician. She is best known for starring as Trudy Wiegel on the mockumentary series Reno 911!, for which she has been nominated for four Primetime Emmy Awards and currently stars as Anne Pagano on the Netflix comedy The Four Seasons. She was first known on television for her sketch comedy work on MTV's The State, where she was the show's lone female cast member. She has also appeared with recurring roles on sitcoms such as Superstore, 2 Broke Girls, Love, and The Ellen Show. In the 1990s, Kenney fronted the all-female rock band Cake Like.

== Career ==
During the early 1990s, Kenney-Silver was the lead singer and bassist of the indie rock band Cake Like.

Kenney-Silver attended New York University where she joined the sketch comedy group The New Group which ultimately became The State. The group was picked up for a self-titled sketch comedy show on MTV, The State, which aired between 1993 and 1995.

After the show's completion, Kenney-Silver continued working with her fellow troupe members on other projects. In 1996, she co-wrote and starred in Viva Variety, a parody of variety shows that aired on Comedy Central for two seasons.

In 2000, Kenney-Silver voiced the character of "Gravitina" in the children's cartoon Buzz Lightyear of Star Command. She has since done a number of voices on the Nickelodeon series Invader Zim. Additionally, she starred as a regular on The Ellen Show, which aired until 2001. She later found success with Reno 911!, a series on Comedy Central that parodied police reality shows like COPS, which also featured former members of the State Thomas Lennon, Ben Garant, and Joe Lo Truglio. The show was originally cancelled in 2009 after six seasons. Kenney-Silver also appeared on the TV series Still Standing.

In July 2008, Kenney-Silver made her debut as "Dame Delilah", the title character in the web series Dame Delilah's Fantasy Ranch & Gift Shoppe. On the site, various comedians give video testimony as characters working at or otherwise visiting the fictional Cat House. Kenney-Silver created the series and it was produced by her husband, Steve Silver, and Jared Mazzaschi.

Kenney-Silver was among the cast of Suburban Shootout, a pilot based on the British comedy of the same name, directed and executive produced by Barry Sonnenfeld for HBO. The pilot filmed in The Hamptons, Long Island, in September 2008. The pilot ultimately was not picked up.

Kenney-Silver has appeared in films such as All About Steve, Reno 911!: Miami, National Lampoon's Pledge This!, Balls of Fury, The Ten, Role Models, and Wanderlust.

In December 2011 it was announced that Kenney-Silver and actress Jamie Denbo were developing a new series for Comedy Central called Dame Delilah’s Rabbit Hole Ranch based on a web series they previously created and starred in.

In 2015 she began voicing the character of Miriam in the Nickelodeon series Harvey Beaks.

From 2016 to 2018, she played the recurring role of Syd (the neighbor of Gillian Jacobs’s character) in the Netflix comedy series Love. Until 2021 she was a recurring character on the NBC sitcom Superstore, playing the role of Jerusha Sturgis, Glenn's wife, who was introduced in the third season.

In 2020, Kenney-Silver reprised her role as Deputy Trudy Wiegel in the seventh season of Reno 911! which aired on Quibi. She also appeared in the 2021 Paramount+ movie, Reno 911! The Hunt for QAnon. The eighth season of the series, now titled Reno 911! Defunded, premiered on The Roku Channel in February 2022.

== Personal life ==
Kenney-Silver married Steven V. Silver in 2004. They have one son, born in August 2005.

== Filmography ==
=== Film ===
Year	Title	Role	Notes
1997	Love God	Darla	
1998	Orange Quarters	First Funeral Mourner	
1999	Terror Firmer	Woman with Eyeball in Her Cleavage	
2001	Wet Hot American Summer	Paco's Wife	Deleted scene
2003	Kim Possible: The Secret Files	The Bebes (voice)	
2005	Waiting...	Lilli	
2006	Pledge This!	Kathy Johnson	
2007	The Ten	Bernice Jaffe	
2007	Reno 911!: Miami	Deputy Trudy Wiegel	Also writer and producer
2007	Balls of Fury	Showgirl	Cameo
2007	The Comebacks	Sports Judge	
2008	Role Models	Lynette Farcques	
2009	All About Steve	Miss Hancock	
2012	Wanderlust	Kathy	
2012	Fun Size	Barb	
2013	Dealin' with Idiots	Caitlin	
2015	Hell and Back	Madame Zonare (voice)	
2016	Other People	Aunt Lynne	
2017	Downsizing	Single Mom Kristen	Cameo
2018	A Futile and Stupid Gesture	Sullivan Producer	
2019	VHYes	Joan	
2026	Gail Daughtry and the Celebrity Sex Pass	Charlotte Manetti	
2026	Wishful Thinking		Post-production

=== Television ===
Year	Title	Role	Notes
1992	You Wrote It, You Watch It	Various Characters	Also writer
1993–1995	The State	Various	26 episodes; also writer and creator
1997	Viva Variety	Agatha Laupin	16 episodes; also writer Nominated—CableACE Award for Outstanding Actress in a Comedy Series
1998	Hercules	Gaia (voice)	Episode: "Hercules and the Prince of Thrace"
2000	Hey Neighbor	Dotty	TV pilot
2000	The Weekenders	Tish's Mom (voice)	Episode: "To Be or Not to Be"
2000	Buzz Lightyear of Star Command	Gravitina (voice)	5 episodes
2001	Clerks	Mother (voice)	2 episodes
2001	Lloyd in Space	Sirenia's Mother (voice)	Episode: "Girl From The Center of the Universe"
2001	The Legend of Tarzan	(voice)	Episode: "Tarzan and the Silver Screen"
2001–2002	The Ellen Show	Pam	16 episodes
2001–2002	Invader Zim	Various (voice)	2 episodes
2002	What I Like About You	Lisa Lillien	Episode: "Pilot"
2002–2004	Teamo Supremo	Electronica (voice)	2 Episodes
2002–2006	Still Standing	Marion Fitzsimmons	5 episodes
2002–2007	Kim Possible	Bebes (voice)	5 episodes
2003	Titletown		TV pilot
2003–2009, 2020–2022	Reno 911!	Deputy Trudy Wiegel	Also writer and creator Nominated—Primetime Emmy Award for Outstanding Short Form Comedy or Drama Series (2020–21); Nominated—Primetime Emmy Award for Outstanding Actress in a Short Form Comedy or Drama Series (2020–21)
2004	Brandy & Mr. Whiskers	Mama Croc (voice)	2 episodes
2004	Cheap Seats: Without Ron Parker	Alice Karp	Episode: "Putt-Putt"
2006	Lovespring International	Beatrice	Episode: "The Psychic"
2007	Wainy Days	Kerri	Episode: "Walking Tour"
2008	Pushing Daisies	Alexandria	Episode: "Oh Oh Oh... It's Magic"
2010	Adventure Time	Various voices	2 episodes
2010	Tax Man	Bethany	TV pilot
2010	Party Down	Aviatrix	Episode: "Not on Your Wife Opening Night"
2010	Pretend Time	Mrs. Hampton	Episode: "Mudslide Junction"
2010–2013	Childrens Hospital	Herself / Dutch Tourist	Episode: "Give a Painted Brother a Break"
2011	Raising Hope	Gwen	Episode: "Everybody Flirts... Sometimes"
2011–2012	NTSF:SD:SUV::	4-Sight	2 episodes
2012	Are You There, Chelsea?	Olga	Episode: "Surprise"
2012	Counter Culture	Billie Haynes	TV pilot
2012	Anger Management	Mel	2 episodes
2012	Burning Love	Jay	2 episodes
2012	Comedy Bang! Bang!	Meryl Hmm	Episode: "Weird Al Yankovic Wears a Hawaiian Shirt"
2012	Sullivan & Son	Jo	Episode: "The Prodigal Sister"
2012	It's Always Sunny in Philadelphia	Therapist	Episode: "The Gang Gets Analyzed"
2013	The New Normal	Dr. Howell	Episode: "Dog Children"
2013	Newsreaders	Tina Barry	Episode: "CCSI: Boston"
2013	Key & Peele	Person at People Park	Episode: "Pussy on the Chainwax"
2014	New Girl	Captain Jan Nortis	Episode: "Cruise"
2014	Us & Them	Gwen	7 episodes
2014–2015	American Dad!	Parole Officer / Rhonda Hughart (voice)	2 episodes
2015	Wet Hot American Summer: First Day of Camp	Real Estate Agent	Episode: "Auditions"
2015–2017	Harvey Beaks	Miriam (voice)	39 episodes
2016	Angie Tribeca	Laurie Partridge	Episode: "Ferret Royale"
2016	Animals.	Leslie (voice)	Episode: "Rats."
2016	Teachers	Mrs. Barkley	Episode: "The Last Day"
2016	Bajillion Dollar Propertie$	Mrs. Gullier	Episode: "Amir Is Glenn's Mentor"
2016	Lady Dynamite	Ginny Kimmle	Episode: "Mein Ramp"
2016	Loosely Exactly Nicole	Bernice	Episode: "Mistress"
2016	Shameless	Constance Grace	Episode: "Requiem for a Slut"
2016–2018	Love	Syd	8 episodes
2017	2 Broke Girls	Denise	3 episodes
2017	Billy Dilley's Super-Duper Subterranean Summer	Mrs. Wretcher	4 episodes
2017	Casual	Joanna	3 episodes
2017–2023	Bob's Burgers	Various voices	5 episodes
2018–2021	Superstore	Jerusha Sturgis	8 episodes
2018	Big Hero 6: The Series	Jaq / Doctor (voice)	Episode: "The Impatient Patient"
2018	The Guest Book	Linda	Episode: "Someplace Other Than Here"
2018–2019	A Series of Unfortunate Events	Babs	4 episodes: "The Hostile Hospital" and "The Penultimate Peril"
2019	Future Man	Forceps	Episode: "A Wolf in the Torque House"
2019	Santa Clarita Diet	Petra Blazic	Episode: "Zombody"
2019	Big Little Lies	Dr. Belinda Shea	Episode: "The End of the World"
2019	Carol's Second Act	Nancy	Episode: "Merry December 19th"
2019–2020	Where's Waldo?	Wizard Lariat / Emu / Playtypus (voice)	Episode: "Australian Blunder Down Under"
2019–2021	Puppy Dog Pals	Various voices	6 episodes
2020	The George Lucas Talk Show	Herself	Episode: "COVID-1138: More American Willoweenie: The Battle for Elector"
2020	Miracle Workers	Lila	3 episodes
2020–2021	Central Park	Various voices	4 episodes
2021	Awkwafina Is Nora from Queens	Phobos	2 episodes
2021	The Ghost and Molly McGee	Sally Tugbottom (voice)	Episode: "Monumental Disaster/Talent Show"
2021	Reno 911!: The Hunt for QAnon	Deputy Trudy Wiegel	TV movie; also writer and producer Nominated—Primetime Emmy Award for Outstanding Television Movie (2022)
2022	Teen Titans Go!	Other Robin (voice)	Episode: "Go!"
2022	Maggie	Maria	13 episodes
2022	Reboot	Susan	2 episodes
2022	The Sex Lives of College Girls	Professor Hennessey	Episode: "Frat Problems"
2022	Reno 911!: It's a Wonderful Heist	Deputy Wiegel / Jackie the Pickle Throwing Hooker	TV movie; also co-writer and producer
2023	Digman!	Professor Lotte Eccleston (voice)	Episode: "Fear of GAWD"
2023	The Great North	Janice / Regina (voice)	2 episodes
2023	What We Do in the Shadows	Helen Johnson	Episode: "Hybrid Creatures"
2024	Hailey's On It!	Gretchen (voice)	Episode: "When Squeeples Attack/Cool Intentions"
2024	Sausage Party: Foodtopia	Various voices	Episode: "First Course"
2025–present	The Four Seasons	Anne Pagano	16 episodes; main cast
2025	Adventure Time: Fionna and Cake	Old Lady Princess (voice)	Episode: "The Bird and the Clock"
2026	Margo's Got Money Troubles	Dana Lockheart	Episode: "Jinxed"
2026	President Curtis	David (voice)	Episode: "David"

=== Video games ===
Year	Title	Role	Notes
2025	Goodnight Universe	Rebecca	
