= Rocky & Bullwinkle (2014 film) =

2014 animated short film directed by Gary Trousdale

- Rocky and Bullwinkle in the film.
- Directed by: Gary Trousdale
- Written by: Robert Ben Garant; Thomas Lennon
- Based on: The Adventures of Rocky and Bullwinkle and Friends by Jay Ward
- Produced by: Denise Nolan Cascino
- Starring: June Foray; Lauri Fraser; Tom Kenny; Robert Cait
- Narrated by: Robert Ben Garant
- Edited by: Mark A. Deimel
- Music by: Tony Morales
- Production companies: DreamWorks Animation; PDI/DreamWorks; Bullwinkle Studios
- Distributed by: 20th Century Fox
- Release date: October 14, 2014; (on the Blu-ray 3D release of Mr. Peabody & Sherman)
- Running time: 9 minutes
- Country: United States
- Language: English

Rocky and Bullwinkle (also known as Another Fine Moose You've Gotten Me Into or The Man In The Iron Moose) is a 2014 American animated short film based on the 1960s animated television series The Rocky and Bullwinkle Show, produced by DreamWorks Animation and distributed by 20th Century Fox. The short was directed by Gary Trousdale, (who is best known for co-directing Disney's Beauty and the Beast) while Robert Ben Garant and Thomas Lennon were the writers (They also provided the voices of Fearless Leader and the narrator for this short). June Foray reprises her role as Rocky in her final voice role before her death on July 26, 2017, while Tom Kenny voices Bullwinkle. Originally planned as a theatrical short to accompany with Mr. Peabody & Sherman (which is also based on characters from The Rocky & Bullwinkle Show), it was released on October 14, 2014, on the Blu-ray 3D of the film.

== Plot ==
Desperate to finally kill Rocky and Bullwinkle and have them as trophy heads for his rumpus room, Fearless Leader assigns his spies Boris Badenov and Natasha Fatale a new mission: to use a robotic female moose to seduce Bullwinkle, and inevitably destroy him (as well as Rocky in the process). Boris controls the robot's actions through the interior.

When Rocky and Bullwinkle return to Frostbite Falls after escaping from a Mayan temple, they are rewarded with a special day of their honor at a town ceremony, in which Bullwinkle is immediately smitten with Boris’ robot disguise. The two spend time together, with Boris constantly attempting to kill Bullwinkle, only to bring himself bad luck to Lady Gaga's "Bad Romance". Meanwhile, Rocky feels isolated from his best friend and follows them wherever they go, until he discovers Bullwinkle has proposed to the robot moose. The narrator tells us to wait for the next part called "Another Fine Moose You've Gotten Me Into!!" or "The Man in the Iron Moose!"

In "Bullwinkle's Poetry Corner," Bullwinkle reads a poem which is actually a rap song by Eminem (whom he formally introduces by his birth name, Marshall Mathers III), entitled Superman, only to stop reading it after just ten words, due to the fact it had swear words in it (which he had been caught by surprise with). Feeling embarrassed and finding no way to finish the rest (and trying, to no avail, to try and find another work of his to read), Bullwinkle then skips it, ends the sketch early, and says next week he will read "the complete works of Mr. Fifty Cents".

Back in the story arc, Rocky arrives to crash the wedding on a cruise ship, but Bullwinkle and the robot moose have already been wedded and Bullwinkle dances with the robot to Jimmy Soul's "If You Wanna Be Happy". Rocky then discovers it was Boris who lured Bullwinkle away with romantic gestures, and tries to stop him only for Natasha to intervene by challenging him to a duel. Boris eventually gets fed up with the act while being hit with a bowling ball and evacuates leaving the robotic bride to explode and kill Bullwinkle. However, he falls back down after finding out his parachute has been taken by Fearless Leader, and falls into the ocean with Natasha. Rocky is able to save Bullwinkle in the last minute, knocking the robot moose off the ship to explode into Boris and Natasha's faces, before the two spies are immediately eaten by a shark. Bullwinkle makes amends with his buddy and they swear never to let anything come between them again, only for Rocky to fall in love with a female explosive mechanical squirrel.

In a mid-credits scene Fearless Leader tries to find his bowling ball and he asks his mother if she saw it to which she replies "Did you look in your killer robot?".

== Voice cast ==
- June Foray as Rocky the Flying Squirrel / Fearless Leader's mother (final voice role before her death in June 2017)
- Tom Kenny as Bullwinkle J. Moose (replacing Keith Scott)
- Robert Cait as Boris Badenov
- Lauri Fraser as Natasha Fatale
- Robert Ben Garant as The Narrator
- Thomas Lennon as Fearless Leader / Mayan Princess
- Stephen Stanton as Captain Peter Peachfuzz
- Corey Burton as Snidely Whiplash / The Mayor of Frostbite Falls
- Sean Bishop as Mayan Priest

== History ==
The short was originally going to be released in theatres in front of Mr. Peabody & Sherman and it was to serve as a test for a possible feature film with the characters. However, Almost Home, a short based on another DreamWorks Animation film, Home, played before the film instead and plans for a feature film were canceled due to Mr. Peabody & Sherman underperforming at the box-office. Soon it was decided that the short itself would be a direct to video short and was released on the Blu-ray 3D disc of Mr. Peabody & Sherman.

=== Music ===
The short features the songs "Bad Romance" by Lady Gaga, and "If You Wanna Be Happy" by Jimmy Soul.
