= List of The State episodes =

This is a list of The State episodes.

== Series overview ==
Season	Episodes	Originally released		
Season	Episodes	First released	Last released	Network
1	5	January 21, 1994	February 18, 1994	MTV
2	6	July 10, 1994	August 21, 1994	MTV
3	6	December 24, 1994	February 11, 1995	MTV
4	7	August 12, 1995	August 26, 1995	MTV
Special	1	October 27, 1995		CBS

== Episodes ==
=== Season 1 (1994) ===
No.	Title	Original release date
1	"Episode 1"	January 21, 1994
Sketches: Boogeyman; Lenny Lipton Show; Hormones; Hops Plus; Free Your Mind (Clown/Pirate); Chip's Party; Hypothetical Question; On-air Personality; Mudwrestler; Eating and Swimming; Forever
2	"Episode 2"	January 28, 1994
Sketches: Fluffy Soft; Gang Fight; "$7,000 Pyramid" featuring Sid Vicious and Nancy Spungen; Old Fashioned Guy (One True God); Cerialist Commercial; Slash; Doug & Dad; Captain Monterey Jack (Leaving the Lights On); Old Fashioned Guy (Fire is Magic); Bigfoot in Office; Louie (at party)
3	"Episode 3"	February 4, 1994
Sketches: Boogeyman; Captain Monterey Jack (shoes); Pies; Thanksgiving Dinner; MTV Sports; Chips Commercial; Foreign Exchange Student; Tape People; Free Your Mind (Tapeface); Chair Wrestling; Mr. Magina; Gilbert Gottfried Link; Crackers
4	"Episode 4"	February 11, 1994
Sketches: Disclaimer; Cute; Punch Out; Ride; Doug & Principal; Don Law; Light Coma; Old Fashioned Guy (Giant); Pants; Captn Monterey Jack (Cheese); On the Table; $240 Worth of Pudding
5	"Episode 5"	February 18, 1994
Sketches: God is Dead; Mind Match (Game show to win orphans); Grandma's Potato Chowder; Hot Pursuits; Free Your Mind (Smoker); James Dixon: Guidance Counselor; Cindy Crawford; Old Fashioned Guy (Sun and Moon); On-air Personality (Youth Conference); Lunch with The State; Missy Von Kimmelman; Old Fashioned Guy (Women Voters); Louie II

=== Season 2 (1994) ===
No.	Title	Original release date
6	"Episode 1"	July 10, 1994
Sketches: Ballet I; James Dixon: Power Priest; Choking; Sleep with The State; Piggy Shoes; Nazi War Criminals; Ballet II; Barry Lutz Show (Monkey Torture); Mime Crash; Ballet III; Service with a Smile (Carl!!!)
7	"Episode 2"	July 17, 1994
Sketches: I'm Watching; Pre-school Narc; Get a Job; Jurassic Park; Norwegian Cruise; Copy Shop; Superfriends; Eating Muppets; Hi Brow / Low Brow
8	"Episode 3"	July 24, 1994
Sketches: Microchip; Bookworm; Down the Pants; Relationship Line; People Really Live This Way; Elevator; State Intro; Phone Line: Carrie; Lois & Clark; Barry & Levon; Phone Line: Plant
9	"Episode 4"	July 31, 1994
Sketches: First Election; Doug III; Dad's Affair; Bownty; Commercial Whaling; Bologna Foot; O'Keefe/Stieglitz; Busted; And; PMS
10	"Episode 5"	August 7, 1994
Sketches: Oh Betty; Otto Bimini; Job Interview; TV Watching; Talk You; Can I Go Play II; Inbred Brothers; Headlines; Can I Go Play III
11	"Episode 6"	August 21, 1994
Sketches: World Records I; Hepcat; Babysitter; Pimple; Teacher's Lounge; World Records II; Dinner: The Kids; Wildtown; Fetishist; Unplugged

=== Season 3 (1994-95) ===
No.	Title	Original release date
12	"Episode 1"	December 24, 1994
Sketches: Beardan High; Boy in a Barn; The Jew, The Italian and The Red Head Gay; Blueberry Johnson; Let's Move Out; For Chelsea; Just the 160,000 of Us; In The Bathroom; Monkeys Do It
13	"Episode 2"	January 14, 1995
Sketches: Tanner's Guide to Jane; Prom Photos; Sea Monkeys; Hits from the 70's; Kabuki Doug; Toothbrush; Lincoln Logs; Staring Contest; The Pope-ah's Visit
14	"Episode 3"	January 21, 1995
Sketches: Not a Talk Show; Where's the Mousey?; Tammy Wilkins: Notebook Artist; The Restaurant Sketch; Deathfight 5000; Fan Names; The Bearded Men of Space Station 11; Origami; Louie & The Last Supper
15	"Episode 4"	January 28, 1995
Sketches: David Wain Open; Freaks; Kill Tim; The Andersons; Festis, the Birthday Hobo; The Animal Song; Booger, Booger & Fartybutt; The Funeral; Asides; Panama
16	"Episode 5"	February 4, 1995
Sketches: Precinct Open; Dan, the Very Popular Openly Gay High School Student; Kerri's Day; Dreamboy; Precinct Link; Polar Bears; Betty's No Good Clothes Shop and Pancake House; Ray Gun; Doug IV; Froggy Jamboree
17	"Episode 6"	February 11, 1995
Sketches: Shower; Planet Groovy; Roughing It; Barney McMacken; Old Lighthouse Jeffers; The Personal State; Drugs; Rug Brothers; Porcupine Racetrack

=== Season 4 (1995) ===
No.	Title	Original release date
18	"Episode 1"	August 12, 1995
Sketches: Narcolepsy Today; Race; Howard Report; H's & M's; Slinky's; Hot Dogs; Tenement; Cleaners; Hallmark; Monkeys Do It II
19	"Episode 2"	August 13, 1995
Sketches: Hokey Pokey; U.S. Men's Bikini Thong Rollerblading Team; Buddy's Home From Finals; Normal Pervert; Taco Man; The Jew, The Italian & The Redhead Gay II, pt. 1; Senator Cavanaugh; The Jew, The Italian & The Redhead Gay II, pt. 2; Sports Beat; Alcoholism; Ken's Dead Montage
20	"Episode 3"	August 14, 1995
Sketches: Ghost Story; Sal & Frankie; SAT's, pt. 1; Dysfunctional Family; Prince's Reception; Cutlery Barn (Fried Bumblebees); Tuxedo; Li'l Brown Dog Food; Die For Love; SAT's, pt. 2; Laupin Variety Programme
21	"Episode 4"	August 15, 1995
Sketches: Hitchiker; Terrorist Situation; Leonard Harris Show; Permanent School Record; Free Market Economy; Beach; Fragments; Billy's Play; Coffee Family; Cannonball Run
22	"Episode 5"	August 16, 1995
Sketches: Great Moments; Prison Break; Sideways House Family; Super Robby; Mr. Flemming's Arrival; Prom; Inbred Bros. -Army; Borscht Boy; Walton's Theme
23	"Episode 6"	August 19, 1995
Sketches: Blinking Contest; Dentist; Sci-Fi Laboratory; High Plains Magic Fairy; Jerry's Audition; Bacon; Kiss My Grits; Last Will & Testament; One Camper
24	"Episode 7"	August 26, 1995
Sketches: L.A. Open; Dixon: Jedi Talent Agent; Tough Choices; Gas Station; Gunter Brothers (Who's On First); Desert Extras; Real Estate Broker; Adventures Of Young God and Wonderboy; Farewell; Hi-lite Reel

=== Special (1995) ===
No.	Title	Original release date
25	"The State's 43rd Annual All-Star Halloween Special"	October 27, 1995
