= Reno 911!: Miami =

2007 American film by Robert Ben Garant

- Theatrical release poster
- Directed by: Robert Ben Garant
- Written by: Robert Ben Garant; Thomas Lennon; Kerri Kenney-Silver
- Based on: Reno 911! by Robert Ben Garant; Thomas Lennon; Kerri Kenney-Silver
- Produced by: Danny DeVito; Michael Shamberg; Stacey Sher; John Landgraf
- Starring: Carlos Alazraqui; Mary Birdsong; Robert Ben Garant; Kerri Kenney-Silver; Thomas Lennon; Wendi McLendon-Covey; Niecy Nash; Cedric Yarbrough
- Cinematography: Joe Kessler
- Edited by: John Refoua
- Music by: Craig Wedren
- Production companies: Comedy Central Films; High Sierra Carpeting; Jersey Films; Double Feature Films; Principato-Young Entertainment
- Distributed by: 20th Century Fox (USA/Canada); Paramount Pictures (International)
- Release date: February 23, 2007
- Running time: 81 minutes
- Country: United States
- Language: English
- Budget: $10 million
- Box office: $22 million

Reno 911!: Miami is a 2007 American cop comedy film based on Comedy Central's Reno 911! series, directed by series co-creator Robert Ben Garant. The film stars Garant alongside Carlos Alazraqui, Mary Birdsong, Kerri Kenney-Silver, Thomas Lennon, Wendi McLendon-Covey, Niecy Nash and Cedric Yarbrough.

Distributed in the United States and Canada by 20th Century Fox and internationally by Paramount Pictures alongside Comedy Central Films, the film was theatrically released on February 23, 2007, receiving mixed to negative reviews, with much of the criticism aimed at its lack of appeal to non-fans.

== Plot ==
The film opens outside a building where terrorists are holding hostages and a nuclear bomb. The fictitious Reno Sheriff's Department arrives in a helicopter, called in as experts. As the group prepare to deal with the situation, Deputy Travis Junior wakes up and realizes it was a dream; he was asleep at the wheel, and the vehicle he and Lt. Dangle are in crashes into a port-a-potty.

The film continues with introductory clips of the officers, exploring how they became interested in law enforcement, à la COPS. After a scene involving a chicken in the road miscoded as an "armed person on a roof", Dangle tells everyone that they have been invited to the American Police Convention in Miami Beach. On arrival, the group finds they're not on the entrant list. Having nowhere to stay, they rent rooms at a motel that seems to be a hub of illegal activities. After partying most of the night, most of the sheriff officers unsuccessfully attempt to seduce one another at the motel, with the men eventually turning to pleasuring themselves to the shock of onlookers.

As everyone recovers from their hangovers, Johnson discovers a tattoo on her breast of a mystery man. The team return to the convention to see if their tickets were found but instead discover the building has been the subject of a biochemical terrorist attack that has quarantined the police attendees inside. The only city official left outside is assistant deputy mayor Jeff Spoder. The head of National Security asks the Reno Sheriffs Department to provide law enforcement for Miami Beach. A high-ranking SWAT agent, Rick "The Condor" Smith, arrives on the scene to give a pep talk but ultimately blows himself up with a grenade he had unpinned during the talk.

The team assume the Miami Sheriff Department's responsibilities and respond to several emergency calls including an alligator in a swimming pool; street prostitution that leads to Reno: 911 regular Terry, who is in town to record an album; and a dead beached whale, which they eventually remove by blowing it up. Jones and Garcia are repeatedly kidnapped by Ethan, a drug lord who imitates Tony Montana. Spoder fires the team for incompetence, but as the team brings a cake to apologize, they learn that Spoder is in cahoots with Ethan to create a drug empire. Spoder kills Ethan and escapes with the bioterrorism antidote. The team take pursuit, and Spoder holds them at gunpoint until Jones and Garcia arrive in a Marine helicopter, at which point Spoder surrenders. Dangle arrests him, but Wiegel, who had been siting in the helicopter, accidentally blows Spoder up.

The antidote is distributed, and the Reno Sheriff's Department are eventually congratulated by their peers for their actions. Dangle accepts a job at the Sheriff's Department in Aspen, which had repeatedly turned him down previously. The remaining team are offered a flight back to Reno by Terry, revealed to have a wealthy father, on Terry's private jet. Back in Reno, Garcia briefs the team on their day's work. Dangle enters, interrupting the briefing and explains that Aspen has a zero-tolerance policy forbidding homosexual sheriffs. Dangle continues the briefing, and reveals the group have been invited to a convention at Scotland Yard.

== Cast ==
- Carlos Alazraqui as Deputy James Oswaldo Garcia
- Mary Birdsong as Deputy Cherisha Kimball
- Robert Ben Garant as Deputy Travis Junior
- Kerri Kenney-Silver as Deputy Trudy Wiegel
- Thomas Lennon as Lieutenant Jim Dangle
- Wendi McLendon-Covey as Deputy Clementine Johnson
- Niecy Nash as Deputy Raineesha Williams
- Cedric Yarbrough as Deputy S. Jones
- Nick Swardson as Terry Bernadino
- Michael Ian Black as Ron
- David Koechner as Sheriff of Aspen
- Patton Oswalt as Jeff Spoder
- Danny DeVito (cameo) as District attorney
- Dwayne Johnson (uncredited cameo) as Agent Rick "The Condor" Smith
- Paul Rudd as Ethan
- Paul Reubens as Sir Terrence Bernadino
- Marisa Petroro as Ethan's girlfriend
- J. P. Manoux (uncredited) as Naked Armenian
- Joe Lo Truglio as Deputy Frank Rizzo

== Production ==
The film stars series regulars Thomas Lennon, Ben Garant, Kerri Kenney-Silver, Cedric Yarbrough, Wendi McLendon-Covey, Niecy Nash, Carlos Alazraqui, along with Paul Rudd, David Koechner, and Mary Birdsong. Certain famed actors make cameos, namely Michael Ian Black (who co-starred with Lennon and Kenney in The State and Viva Variety), Patton Oswalt (comedian and The King of Queens co-star), Danny DeVito (one of the film's executive producers), Paul Reubens (playing a different character than he plays on the series), Nick Swardson (who appears as his show character "Terry"), and Dwayne Johnson (professional wrestler The Rock). All members of The State appear in the film.

The theme song, "Police and Thieves", is performed by Dave Grohl of the Foo Fighters and subsequent theme song "Do Little Things" is performed by "Changing Faces and Ivan Matias". This is alluded to by Lennon, Garant, and Kenney-Silver on one of the audio commentaries, who say they are not allowed to discuss who performed the song, but advise that viewers "Google it" to find the answer. For the benefit of first-time viewers and unassuming moviegoers, the film reprises some jokes from the series, an example being Dangle's explanation for wearing shorts on the job, also featured in the pilot episode.

Principal photography took place throughout March 2006 in Miami and Southern California.

== Reception ==
=== Box office ===
Reno 911!: Miami opened in 2,702 venues and earned $10.3 million in its debut, ranking fourth in the North American box office and second among the week's new releases. The film ended its run on May 3, 2007, with $20.3 million domestically and $1.7 million overseas for a worldwide total of $22 million. Based on a $10 million budget, it was a moderate success.

=== Critical response ===
Reno 911!: Miami received mostly mixed reviews from critics, holding a 35% rating on review aggregator website Rotten Tomatoes based on 100 reviews, with an average of 5.0/10. The site's consensus states: "Reno 911!'s anarchic brand of comedy loses much in translation to the big screen where it feels slapdash and shallow." Metacritic reports a 47 out of 100 score based on 22 critics, indicating "mixed or average reviews".

=== Home media ===
In North America, the DVD was released in two versions on June 19, 2007, an unrated version and the theatrical version. The DVD sold 894,739 units, which gathered a revenue of $16,282,178.

A second unrated cut was released on September 9, 2008.

== Cancelled and potential sequel ==
Garant and Lennon stated in their book Writing Movies for Fun and Profit, a sequel would not be produced because of insufficient box office returns. In the book, a treatment, or extensive outline of what the sequel would have been is included, entitled Reno 911!: SOS. The plot involved the characters of Reno 911! getting stuck on a deserted island with a serial killer on the loose.
