= Organ Trail (film) =

2023 American film by Michael Patrick Jann

- Theatrical release poster
- Directed by: Michael Patrick Jann
- Written by: Megan Turner
- Produced by: David Codron; Michael Patrick Jann
- Starring: Zoé De Grand Maison; Mather Zickel; Lisa LoCicero
- Cinematography: Joe Kessler
- Edited by: David Codron
- Music by: Craig Wedren; Jherek Bischoff
- Production companies: Tatterdemalion Pictures; Three Point Capital
- Distributed by: Paramount Pictures
- Release date: April 14, 2023
- Running time: 112 minutes
- Country: United States
- Language: English

Organ Trail is a 2023 American horror Western film directed by Michael Patrick Jann, written by Megan Turner, and starring Zoé De Grand Maison, Mather Zickel, and Lisa LoCicero. Set in the 1870s on the Oregon Trail, the story follows Abigale Archer as she attempts to retrieve her family's horse while fighting against the outlaws that killed her parents and brother.

== Plot ==
In Montana, 1870, the Archer family escapes a winter storm and makes camp so their horse, Fable, can rest. The family consists of Abraham, Celeste, and their teenage children, Tobias and Abby. Tobias and Abraham discover a massacred wagon train, and the only survivor is a woman named Cassidy, who has been injured by arrows driven through her palms. The Archers treat her wounds and give her shelter.

That night, four bandits – Logan, Rhys, Brody, and Felix – invade the camp and kill Abraham, Celeste, and Tobias. Cassidy, Abby, and Fable are taken to a fortified ghost town that acts as the gang's headquarters. Abby learns that Cassidy works for the gang, and the leader, Logan, exerts abusive power over her. Her hand wounds were punishment for attempting to run away. Logan regularly uses her as bait to lure travelers into stopping so they're easier to ambush.

Rhys makes arrowheads with a unique mold but he doesn't wear gloves while working with molten metal. He explains to Brody and Felix that he cannot feel pain. Abby tries to escape from the bandits, leading Brody to accidentally kill himself. She jumps into a frozen river and is carried away by the current. Logan demands Cassidy bring her back, dead or alive.

A rancher named Erik finds Abby in the river. He takes her to his house on Wicker Ranch, where his pregnant wife, Nora, nurses the hypothermic Abby back to health.

Meanwhile, Cassidy heads to the camp where the Archer family was murdered. Along the way, she marks her trail by sticking Rhys's arrowheads into tree bark. Abby steals Erik's horse, Orion, and travels to her family's camp. She finds Cassidy there, who claims she doesn't want to return to the gang. Abby, however, plans to go back for Fable.

Logan discovers that Cassidy stole a stash of the unique arrowheads that could connect the gang to their crimes. Fearing she will give the gang up to the law, he orders Rhys to bring Cassidy back alive.

Erik sets out on foot after Abby and Orion. He crosses paths with Rhys, who learns that Erik found some of the arrowheads that Cassidy took. Rhys forces Erik at gunpoint to travel with him, and they find her at the Archer camp. Abby hides on a nearby hill. Rhys shoots Erik, and then takes Cassidy and Orion back to the ghost town. Abby discovers that Erik is alive; the bullet was stopped by a buckle inside his jacket. She apologizes for stealing Orion, and they team up to retrieve their horses.

Back at the ghost town, Logan ties Cassidy to a pole in the town square. Rhys kills Logan after they disagree over what to do with her. He informs Cassidy that, if she survives the night outside, she'll belong to him.

That night, Abby enters the ghost town, and a disillusioned Felix helps her free Cassidy. Abby, Fable, Cassidy and Felix make it to the town gate, where Erik is waiting. Rhys attacks and they must leave Orion behind. Rhys accidentally ignites lantern oil, which spills on him and burns his upper body until he collapses. He fatally shoots Felix in the neck.

Abby, Cassidy, Erik, and Fable return to Wicker Ranch, seemingly safe and sound. However, a severely burned Rhys arrived there before them by riding Orion, and he takes the women hostage. A fight ensues, in which Rhys impales Cassidy through the torso with an arrow. She throws herself onto Rhys, stabbing him in the chest and killing them both.

Abby and Fable remain on Wicker Ranch. Erik and Nora have a daughter, whom they name Cassie.

== Cast ==
- Zoé De Grand Maison as Abigale "Abby" Archer
- Mather Zickel as Abraham "Pa" Archer
- Lisa LoCicero as Celeste "Ma" Archer
- Lukas Jann as Tobias Archer
- Olivia Grace Applegate as Cassidy
- Sam Trammell as Logan
- Nicholas Logan as Rhys
- Michael Abbott Jr. as Brody
- Alejandro Akara as Felix
- Clé Bennett as Erik
- Jessica Frances Dukes as Nora
- Thomas Lennon as Royale Fitzgibbon

== Production ==
The idea for Organ Trail occurred when screenwriter Meg Turner made a spelling error while searching for the Oregon Trail game online. Finding the title intriguing and funny, Turner began brainstorming. They described the basic concept as, "...what if Quentin Tarantino wrote The Little House On the Prairie?" After tweeting the title and concept in April 2021, director Michael Patrick Jann optioned the script in May. Paramount Pictures purchased the script in October.

In March 2022, it was announced that Jann and David Codron would produce Organ Trail, Jann would direct, and the film would star Zoé De Grand Maison, Olivia Applegate, Clé Bennett, Sam Trammell, and Jessica Frances Dukes. Later that month, Mather Zickel was announced to have joined the cast as Pa Archer, a Civil War veteran. In April, Michael Abbott Jr. was included in the cast list of the film, which had wrapped production by that point.

Filming took place during February 2022 during the COVID-19 pandemic, around Livingston, Montana. Applegate recalled filming in remote locations that sometimes required traveling by snowmobile and bringing food to set by sled; the cast and crew were provided with warming tents and a bathroom tent.

== Release ==
Paramount Pictures released a trailer the day before the release of Organ Trail. The film was given a limited release in theaters, opening on April 14, 2023. It was released to VOD on May 12, 2023.

== Reception ==
Tyler Doupe' of Dread Central praised the film as "a gruesome horror-western that serves up a dynamic cast of characters and a killer denouement." He noted, "this picture plays it straight a lot more than I was anticipating. And that works to its advantage."

Cody Hamman of JoBlo.com expressed surprise that the film was labeled a "Horror Western," as Hamman "wouldn't have considered [it] to be a horror movie otherwise." He gave Organ Trail a negative review, writing, "I found it to be quite dull. There are some good ideas in there, but the lumbering execution wasn't right for the story."

Brandon Zachary for CBR wrote "Organ Trail is a solid Western with thriller elements, but it can't quite reach the horrific heights it's aiming for." However, Zachary praised the script and cast.
