= Hell Baby =

- Directed by: Robert Ben Garant; Thomas Lennon
- Written by: Robert Ben Garant; Thomas Lennon
- Produced by: Sean McKittrick; Jeff Culotta; Peter Principato; Paul Young; Robert Ben Garant; Thomas Lennon
- Starring: Rob Corddry; Leslie Bibb; Keegan-Michael Key; Riki Lindhome; Rob Huebel; Paul Scheer; Robert Ben Garant; Thomas Lennon; Michael Ian Black; Kumail Nanjiani; Dave Holmes
- Cinematography: Charles Papert
- Edited by: Kevin Oeser
- Music by: Michael Farrell
- Production companies: Darko Entertainment; Principato-Young Entertainment
- Distributed by: Millennium Entertainment; Gravitas Ventures
- Release dates: January 20, 2013 (Sundance Film Festival); September 6, 2013 (United States)
- Running time: 94 minutes
- Country: United States
- Language: English
- Budget: $2.5 million
- Box office: $8,785

Hell Baby is a 2013 American horror-comedy film written and directed by Robert Ben Garant and Thomas Lennon. It stars Rob Corddry, Leslie Bibb, Keegan-Michael Key, Riki Lindhome, Rob Huebel and Paul Scheer. Writer-directors Garant and Lennon also co-star as a pair of priests.

It premiered at the Sundance Film Festival on January 20, 2013. It was made available on VOD beginning July 25, 2013 before its theatrical release on September 6, 2013.

== Plot ==
An expectant couple move into a haunted fixer-upper in New Orleans. There, they encounter a neighbour named F'resnel who tells them about the bloody history of their house.

Vanessa and her husband, Jack, exhibiting a certain carelessness in their house hunting, buy a foreboding wreck of a place in New Orleans that the local residents have given demonic nicknames like "House of Blood". Vanessa is already extremely pregnant when they move in, and soon she is talking like Regan from The Exorcist. The Vatican sends ghost hunters Father Padrigo and Father Sebastian to deal with the situation. Vanessa's Wiccan Sister Marjorie also joins her and Jack, and tries to break the curse on the house with her spell-craft ritual acts of magic. All three fail when, after a normal baby is born to Vanessa, a demonic horned baby is also born. The baby attacks and in the ensuing gory carnage Marjorie, two policemen, and Father Padrigo die, before Jack kills the demon baby with a floor lamp.

== Cast ==
Actor	Role
Rob Corddry	Jack
Leslie Bibb	Vanessa
Keegan-Michael Key	F'resnel
Riki Lindhome	Marjorie
Rob Huebel	Micky
Paul Scheer	Ron
Robert Ben Garant	Father Sebastian
Thomas Lennon	Father Padrigo
Michael Ian Black	Dr. Marshall
Kumail Nanjiani	Cable Guy
Alex Berg	Cheerful Guy
Dave Holmes	Rental Car Guy
David Pasquesi	Cardinal Vicente

== Reception ==
On review aggregator Rotten Tomatoes, the film holds an approval rating of 33% based on 39 reviews, with an average rating of 4.43/10. The website's critics consensus reads: "Though its brand of immature comedy may appeal to some, Hell Baby misses the mark with much of its humor, rendering it a largely ineffective—and often crass—genre sendup." On Metacritic, it has a weighted average score of 41 out of 100, based on 15 critics, indicating "mixed or average" reviews.

Badass Digest called the movie "silly, lowbrow, and funny." CraveOnline called it a "triumph of independence" and a "genuinely hilarious farce." TheDissolve said, "Hell Baby falls unmistakably on the 'comedy' side of the horror-comedy divide. It isn't overly concerned with being scary, just with delivering a steady stream of laughs."

Deadline Hollywood reported that the movie was acquired by Millennium Films for U.S. Distribution and was slated to be released in the fall of 2013.

The Hollywood Reporter reviewed Hell Baby following its premiere at the 2013 Sundance Film Festival, describing it as a parody that “awkwardly mashes together thematic elements from Rosemary’s Baby and The Exorcist.” It characterized the movie as a “lighthearted horror spoof” with repetitive humor and limited comedic payoff.

Gabe Toro of IndieWire described Hell Baby as “barely a movie,” criticizing its loose structure and reliance on sketch-style humor over narrative cohesion.

New York Times review, critic Neil Genzlinger described Hell Baby as a horror comedy that “rarely dares to be smart,” relying on overused gags rather than sharp humor. While praising Leslie Bibb’s energetic performance, he found the film weighed down by dull supporting characters and predictable jokes. Genzlinger concluded that only Keegan-Michael Key provided genuine laughs in an otherwise “yawn-inducing” parody of demonic-possession films.
