= Thomas Lennon =

American comedian, actor, and screenwriter (born 1970)

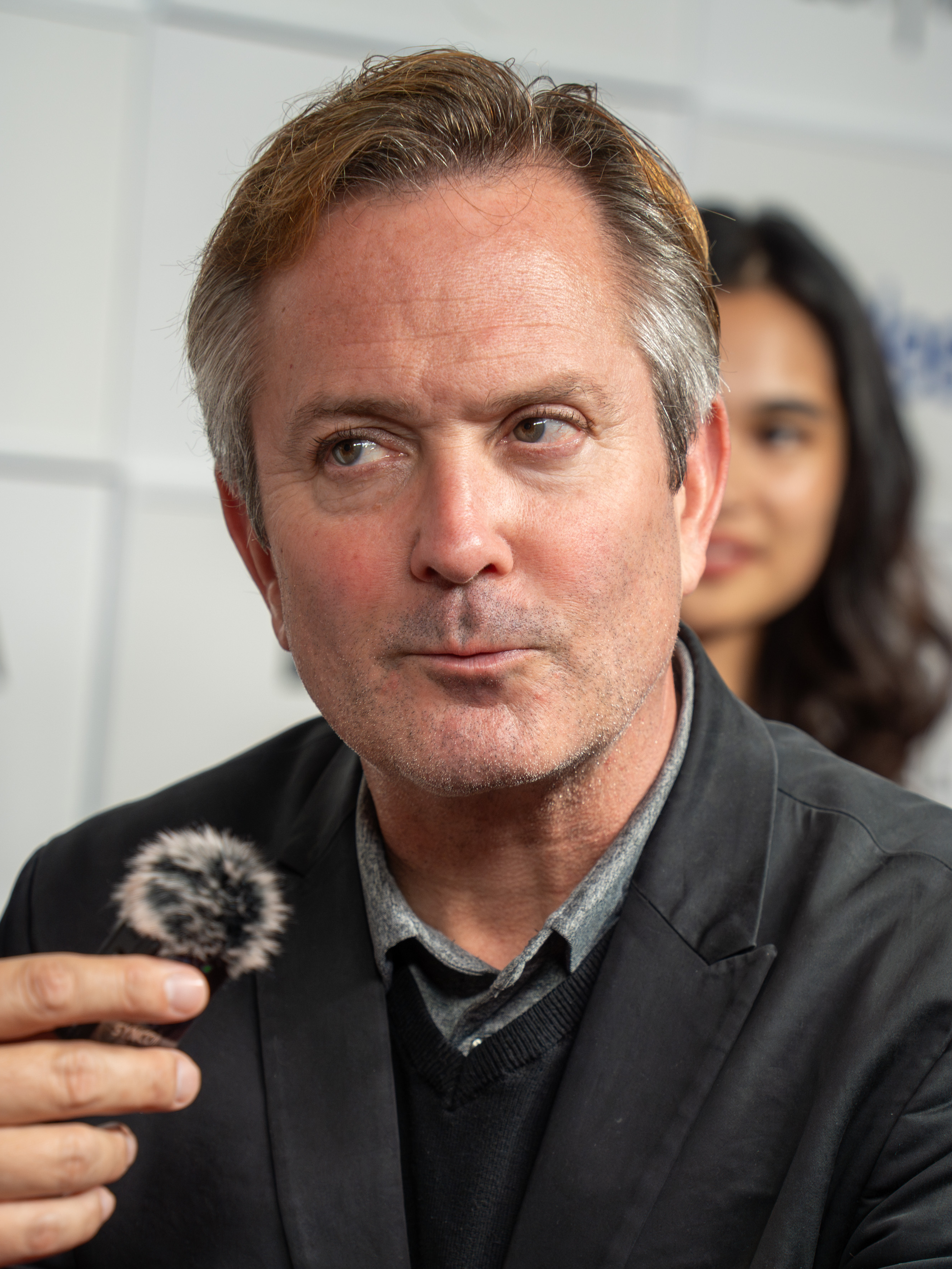
- Lennon in 2025
- Born: August 9, 1970 (age 56); Oak Park, Illinois, U.S.
- Other name: Tom Lennon
- Education: New York University
- Occupations: Comedian; actor; screenwriter
- Years active: 1991–present
- Spouse: Jenny Robertson (m. 2002)
- Children: 1

Thomas Lennon (born August 9, 1970) is an American comedian, actor, and screenwriter. He plays Lieutenant Jim Dangle on the series Reno 911!, Andrei Novak on Santa Clarita Diet and Felix Unger on The Odd Couple. He is the screenwriter of several comedies released by major film studios with writing partner Robert Ben Garant, with whom he wrote the Night at the Museum films, The Pacifier, Balls of Fury, and Baywatch.

== Early life, family and education ==
Lennon was born on August 9, 1970 in Oak Park, Illinois, a suburb of Chicago. Of Irish and Scottish descent, he is the son of Kathleen (née McSheehy) and Timothy Lennon. He graduated from Oak Park and River Forest High School in 1988.

At 16, he met friend and future co-star Kerri Kenney at theater camp at Northwestern University. The two later attended New York University, where they joined a comedy troupe, The New Group.

== Career ==
=== Acting and performing ===
While Lennon was a member of The New Group, the comedy troupe changed its name to The State. As they performed material at theaters and clubs in New York City, they worked on the MTV show You Wrote It, You Watch It. This led to their self-titled series The State, which ran from 1993 to 1995 on MTV. It was nominated for a 1995 Cable Ace Award for Best Comedy Series. In the same year, they created The State's 43rd Annual All-Star Halloween Special for CBS.

After the departure of The State from MTV and failed long-term deals with both ABC and CBS, Lennon, along with Kenney, Robert Ben Garant, and Michael Ian Black, created and starred in the Comedy Central program Viva Variety (1997–99). The show was based on "The Mr. and Former Mrs. Laupin Variety Programme," a sketch which Lennon had written for the final season of The State. Viva Variety received a 1997 Cable Ace Award nomination for Best Comedy Series.

After Viva Variety, Lennon, Kenney, and Garant created and starred in Reno 911! (2003–2009). The series was initially slated to be on Fox, but the channel rejected it for being too risqué and the program ended up on Comedy Central.

Lennon has appeared as a guest star in dozens of TV shows including The League, Childrens Hospital, Party Down, New Girl, How I Met Your Mother, Comedy Bang! Bang!, and Don't Trust the B— in Apartment 23. One of his notable guest starring roles was as Joey Tribbiani's blackjack-dealing "identical hand twin" on the Friends fifth-season finale ("The One In Vegas", Pts. I and II). Additionally, he has appeared on Jimmy Kimmel Live!, The Tonight Show, The Daily Show, Late Night with Jimmy Fallon and with 31, had the second-highest number of appearances on The Late Late Show with Craig Ferguson. In 2008, he began doing stand-up comedy, occasionally playing guitar, and incorporating music. He appeared on The Meltdown with Jonah and Kumail, John Oliver's New York Stand-Up Show, The Jeselnik Offensive, and The Benson Interruption. He was the guest on the first episode of Chris Hardwick's The Nerdist Podcast, which was recorded in Lennon's garage. In 2010, Lennon and Garant created and starred in a sitcom pilot, The Strip, for NBC. In May of that year, NBC announced that it would not produce it as a series.

In November and December 2011, Lennon filled in as guest voice for the robot sidekick Geoff Peterson on the CBS show The Late Late Show with Craig Ferguson. Lennon has appeared in many films including Bad Teacher, Memento, How to Lose a Guy in 10 Days, Transformers: Age of Extinction, and I Love You, Man, for which he and co-star Paul Rudd were nominated for a 2009 MTV Movie Award for Best Kiss. In two of Christopher Nolan's films, Memento (2000) and The Dark Knight Rises (2012), Lennon played a doctor.

Lennon's voice acting work includes Kim Possible, Bob's Burgers, Archer, Planet Sheen in which he played the character of Pinter, and Rock Paper Scissors in which he voiced one of the titular characters, Paper. He played Scribble in Secret of the Wings and Tinker Bell and the Legend of the NeverBeast. He was the voice of Eddie the Shipboard Computer in the film version of The Hitchhiker's Guide to the Galaxy and the voice of Fearless Leader in the 2014 DreamWorks short film version of Rocky and Bullwinkle. He also voiced Munk on Dawn of the Croods and the voice of Chief O'Hara in the Warner Brothers animated film Batman: Return of the Caped Crusaders.

Lennon was a producer of the 2013–2017 late-night panel game show, @midnight, hosted by Hardwick; Lennon appeared 17 times on the show as a panelist/contestant. He won the show seven times. He played Felix Unger in the 2015–17 television series reboot of The Odd Couple opposite Matthew Perry, who played Oscar Madison. In 2016, he co-starred as a scientist in Paramount Animation's Monster Trucks and began a recurring role on the Fox action sitcom Lethal Weapon as Leo Getz, a character which was previously portrayed on film by Joe Pesci. At the 2016 People's Choice Awards ceremony, Lennon participated in an on-stage sketch parodying a recent gaffe by Steve Harvey at the Miss Universe 2015 pageant. In 2020 and 2021, he had a recurring role in Supergirl's fifth and sixth seasons as Mr. Mxyzptlk, taking over from Peter Gadiot.

In 2020, Lennon reprised his role as Lieutenant Jim Dangle in the seventh season of Reno 911! which aired on Quibi. He appeared in the 2021 film Reno 911! The Hunt for QAnon. The eighth season of the series, now titled Reno 911! Defunded, premiered on The Roku Channel in February 2022. In 2023, he was cast in the Zoey 101 reboot, Zoey 102. The film was released on July 27, 2023, on Paramount+.

=== Screenwriting ===
Lennon is a successful screenwriter and script doctor. Most of his screenplays are written in collaboration with writing partner Robert Ben Garant. Their films have earned over $1.4 billion at the worldwide box office. Among Garant and Lennon's credits are the Night at the Museum films, the 2005 Disney comedy The Pacifier and the 2006 prison comedy Let's Go to Prison.

In 2010, FX Network ordered a pilot episode for a Garant/Lennon science fiction television comedy called USS Alabama, set 1000 years in the future aboard a United Nations Peacekeeping spaceship, the U.S.S. Alabama. Garant and Lennon wrote a book about writing for film called Writing Movies for Fun and Profit: How We Made a Billion Dollars at the Box Office and You Can Too! in 2011. They wrote, directed, and starred in the 2013 film Hell Baby starring Rob Corddry and Leslie Bibb. The film was produced by Darko Entertainment and shot on location in New Orleans. Hell Baby premiered at the 2013 Sundance Film Festival. Garant and Lennon are credited as story co-writers for the film version of Baywatch (2017). Lennon is the author of four of IFC's "50 Greatest Comedy Sketches of All Time".

=== Novels and stage ===
Lennon has written three young adult novels: Ronan Boyle and the Bridge of Riddles, Ronan Boyle and the Swamp of Certain Death, and Ronan Boyle into the Strangeplace. Ronan Boyle and the Bridge of Riddles debuted on The New York Times Best Seller list. He wrote the book for the theatrical production of Trading Places: The Musical! which debuted at the Alliance Theatre in Atlanta in June 2022.

== Personal life ==
Lennon lives in Wisconsin with his wife, actress Jenny Robertson, whom he married in 2002, and their son. He is a fan of The Smiths and Morrissey, occasionally performing live as a guitarist with the tribute band Sweet and Tender Hooligans.

== Filmography ==
=== Film ===
Year	Title	Role	Notes
1994	A Friend of Dorothy	'Moonie'	Short film
1998	Row Your Boat	Census Taker	
1999	Drop Dead Gorgeous	Documentarian	Voice
2000	Memento	Doctor	
2001	Out Cold	Eric Montclare	
2002	Boat Trip	The Priest	
2003	Le Divorce	Roger Walker	
2003	How to Lose a Guy in 10 Days	Thayer	
2003	A Guy Thing	Pete Morse	
2004	Taxi	—N/a	Writer
2004	Heights	Marshall	
2005	Conversations with Other Women	Videographer	
2005	Herbie: Fully Loaded	Larry Murphy	Also writer
2005	The Hitchhiker's Guide to the Galaxy	Eddie the Shipboard Computer	Voice
2005	The Godfather of Green Bay	D.U.G.	
2005	The Pacifier	—N/a	Writer
2006	Night at the Museum	—N/a	Writer
2006	Bickford Shmeckler's Cool Ideas	Police officer	
2006	Let's Go to Prison	—N/a	Writer
2006	Eden Court	Shroeder Duncan	
2007	Balls of Fury	Karl Wolfschtagg	Also writer, producer
2007	Reno 911!: Miami	Lieutenant Jim Dangle	Also writer, executive producer
2007	The Ten	Scotty Pale	
2008	Hancock	Mike	
2009	Night at the Museum: Battle of the Smithsonian	Orville Wright	Also writer Uncredited cameo
2009	17 Again	Ned Gold	
2009	I Love You, Man	Doug	
2009	Al's Brain in 3-D	Co-Worker	Short film
2010	Hot Tub Time Machine	Customer	Uncredited
2011	Cedar Rapids	Roger Lemke	
2011	How to Survive a Robot Uprising	—N/a	Writer
2011	Bad Teacher	Carl Halabi	
2011	What's Your Number?	Dr. Barrett 'Barry' Ingold	
2011	A Very Harold & Kumar 3D Christmas	Todd	
2012	The Hunger Pains	Buttitch Totalapathy	Short film
2012	What to Expect When You're Expecting	Craig	
2012	The Dark Knight Rises	Doctor	
2012	Secret of the Wings	Reading Fairy	Voice
2012	Howard Cantour.com	Rocco	Short film
2013	Hell Baby	Pat	Also writer, producer, director (with Robert Ben Garant)
2013	Rapture-Palooza	Mr. Murphy	
2013	Jerry, the Exorcist Roommate	Jerry	Short film
2013	We're the Millers	Rick Nathanson	
2014	Mr. Peabody and Sherman	Italian Peasant #2	Voice; also wrote additional dialogue
2014	Transformers: Age of Extinction	Chief of Staff	
2014	Rocky & Bullwinkle	Fearless Leader, Mayan Princess	Voice, short film; also writer
2014	Tinker Bell and the Legend of the NeverBeast	Scribble	Voice
2015	Knight of Cups	Tom	
2015	Hot Tub Time Machine 2	BMW Guy	Uncredited
2015	Grand Zero	David Van Vleck	Short film
2016	Batman: Return of the Caped Crusaders	Chief O'Hara	Voice
2016	Monster Trucks	Dr. Jim Dowd	
2017	Baywatch	—N/a	Story writer
2017	Pottersville	Brock Masterson	
2017	Batman vs. Two-Face	Chief O'Hara	Voice
2018	A Futile and Stupid Gesture	Michael O'Donoghue	
2018	The 15:17 to Paris	Principal Michael Akers	
2018	Half Magic	Darren	
2018	Dog Days	Greg	
2018	Puppet Master: The Littlest Reich	Edgar Easton	
2019	VHYes	Tony V.	
2020	Valley Girl	Rodney Bingenheimer	
2020	Have a Good Trip: Adventures in Psychedelics	Himself	
2021	Cherry	Dr. Whomever	
2021	Shoplifters of the World	Uncle Dick	
2022	Weird: The Al Yankovic Story	Salesman	
2022	Night at the Museum: Kahmunrah Rises Again	Theodore Roosevelt	Voice
2023	Zoey 102	Kelley Kevyn	
2023	Urkel Saves Santa: The Movie	V.D.I	Voice; direct-to-video
2023	Organ Trail	Royale Fitzgibbon	
2024	Destroy All Neighbors	Scott	
2024	Chosen Family	Max	
2024	Unfrosted	Harold von Braunhut	
2025	Gabby's Dollhouse: The Movie	Matthew	Voice
2026	Gail Daughtry and the Celebrity Sex Pass	King of the Whip Curl Remy Fontaine	
2026	Christmas at the Kringles	Nick Kringle	
TBA	Casket Girls	TBA	Post-production

=== Television ===
Year	Title	Role	Notes
1992	You Wrote It, You Watch It	Various characters	Also writer
1993–1995	The State	Various characters	Also co-creator and writer
1995	The State's 43rd Annual All-Star Halloween Special	Various characters	Television special; also writer
1997	Viva Variety	Host Meredith Laupin	16 episodes; also writer
1997–1999	Hercules	Atlas	Voice, 3 episodes
1999	Friends	Randall	2 episodes
1999	Strangers with Candy	—N/a	Writer: "Bogie Nights"
1999–2000	Jesse	Ernie	2 episodes
2001	The Legend of Tarzan	Landlord	Voice, episode: "Tarzan and the Mysterious Visitor"
2002	Kim Possible	Dr. Fester	Voice, episode: "Kimitation Nation"
2002	MDs	Chester E. Donge	8 episodes
2003–2009, 2020–2022	Reno 911!	Lieutenant Jim Dangle	Also creator, writer, director Nominated—Primetime Emmy Award for Outstanding Short Form Comedy or Drama Series (2020)
2004–2006	Brandy & Mr. Whiskers	Vic	Voice, 2 episodes
2006	Stacked	Gary	Episode: "You're Getting Sleepy"
2007	Wainy Days	Ice Cream Man	Episode: "Dorvid Days"
2009	The League	Bryce	Episode: "The Usual Bet"
2010	Party Down	Nick DiCintio	Episode: "Nick DiCintio's Orgy Night"
2010	Svetlana	Fyodor	Episode: "Wish Fulfillment"
2010–2011	Funny or Die Presents	Richard, Co-Pilot	5 episodes
2010–2013	Planet Sheen	Pinter, Blurg	Voice, 15 episodes
2010–2019	Archer	Charles	Voice, 4 episodes
2011	Memphis Beat	Keith Grant	Episode: "Inside Man"
2011	Childrens Hospital	Pat	Episode: "Home Is Where the Hospital Is"
2011	The Late Late Show with Craig Ferguson	Geoff Peterson, Robot Skeleton, Chloe Banderas	Voice, 3 episodes
2012–2015	Comedy Bang! Bang!	Various characters	4 episodes
2012	New Girl	Neil	Episode: "See Ya"
2012	How I Met Your Mother	Klaus	2 episodes
2012	Don't Trust the B— in Apartment 23	Trey	Episode: "Whatever It Takes..."
2012	Blake Shelton's Not So Family Christmas	Director	Television special
2012–2024	Bob's Burgers	Chuck / various	Voice, 7 episodes
2013	Franklin & Bash	Harley	Episode: "Shoot to Thrill"
2013	NTSF:SD:SUV::	Santa	Episode: "Wreck the Halls"
2013	@midnight	Contestant	Also executive producer
2013	Key & Peele	Person At People Park #5	Episode: "Pussy on the Chainwax"
2013	Wendell & Vinnie	Lord Derek	Episode: "Swindle & Vinnie"
2013–2014	Sean Saves the World	Max Thompson	14 episodes
2013–2014	Newsreaders	Vincent Gates, Pritchard Batchman	3 episodes
2014	Hollywood Game Night	Himself	Episode: "Things That Go Clue-Boom in the Night"
2014	The Goldbergs	Tauntaun Todd	Episode: "A Wrestler Named Goldberg"
2014	Hot in Cleveland	Agent Gilmore	Episode: "Surprise!"
2014	The Birthday Boys	Lou Skywalker	Episode: "Cerf's Folly"
2014	Comedy Central's All-Star Non-Denominational Christmas Special	—N/a	Television special; writer
2015	Over the Garden Wall	Jimmy Brown	Voice, episode: "Schooltown Follies"
2015	The Hotwives	Garrett Truesdale	Episode: "You Make Me Wanna Drought"
2015	Crash Test: With Rob Huebel and Paul Scheer	Studio Security	Television special
2015	Robot Chicken	Various characters	Voice, episode: "Garbage Sushi"
2015–2017	The Odd Couple	Felix Unger	Main role (38 episodes); also co-executive producer
2015–2016	Another Period	Marquis de Sainsbury	5 episodes
2015–2016	TripTank	Caller, Broker, Rob	Voice, 3 episodes
2015–2016	Dawn of the Croods	Munk, Crud, Monkhuahua, Gunk, Wal, Mama Munk	Voice, 9 episodes
2015–2019	Drunk History	Various characters	3 episodes
2016	Animals.	Kevin	Voice, episode: "Rats."
2016–2017	Goldie & Bear	Brian	Voice, 2 episodes
2016–2017	Lego Star Wars: The Freemaker Adventures	Wick Cooper, Cleaning Droid	Voice, 6 episodes
2016–2019	Bajillion Dollar Propertie$	Serge	9 episodes; also executive producer
2016–2025	American Dad!	Various Characters	Voice, 21 episodes
2017–2019	Santa Clarita Diet	Principal Novak	Recurring role; 6 episodes
2017–2019	Lethal Weapon	Leo Getz	Recurring role
2017	Milo Murphy's Law	Henry	Voice, episode: "Murphy's Lard"
2017	Justice League Action	Amazo	Voice, episode: "Boo-ray for Bizarro"
2017–2018	Spirit Riding Free	Garrett Truesdale, Auctioneer, Rooster	Voice, 2 episodes
2018	The Thundermans	Assista Boy	Episode: "Side-Kicking and Screaming"
2018	For the People	Freddie Morris, Captain Shadow	Episode: "Everybody's a Superhero"
2018	Dallas & Robo	Dr. John Eichler, Dickie St. James	Voice, episode: "Murder on the Georgia Overdrive"
2018	Legend of the Three Caballeros	Clinton Coot	Voice, 8 episodes
2018	Sideswiped	Aaron Cunningham	Episode: "Matched Up"
2018	Spy Kids: Mission Critical	Dr. Chad Jericho	Voice, episode: "Ace Off"
2019	Teachers	Larry Bop	Episode: "Face Your Peers"
2019	Knight Squad	Sir Angus Macchio	Episode: "Knight of the Living Dead"
2019	Critters: A New Binge	Mr. Weber	3 episodes
2019	American Housewife	Simon	Episode: "Insta-Friends"
2019	At Home with Amy Sedaris	Edwin Chuzzlewit	Episode: "Halloween"
2019	Modern Family	Orson	Episode: "Can't Elope"
2019	Veep	President of CBS	Episode: "Oslo"
2019	Crank Yankers	Himself	Voice, episode: "Tiffany Haddish, Roy Wood Jr. & Thomas Lennon"
2019–2021	Where's Waldo?	Wizard Whitebeard, various voices	Voice, main role (40 episodes)
2020	The Twilight Zone	J.J. Malloy	Episode: "Ovation"
2020	Close Enough	Henri	Voice, episode: "Haunted Couch"
2020	Home Movie: The Princess Bride	Prince Humperdinck	2 episodes
2020–2021	Supergirl	Mr. Mxyzpltk	4 episodes
2021	Solar Opposites	Police Cop	Voice, episode: "The Sacred Non-Repeating Number"
2021	Infinity Train	Spiceman	Voice, episode: "The Party Car"
2021	Friends: The Reunion	Himself	HBO Max special
2021	Central Park	Leslie Portergrave	Voice, episode: "Central Dark"
2021	Aquaman: King of Atlantis	Nuidis Vulko	Voice, 3 episodes
2021	The Big Leap	Zach Peterman	5 episodes
2021	Reno 911! The Hunt for QAnon	Lieutenant Jim Dangle	TV movie; also writer, executive producer
2021–2025	Jellystone!	Top Cat	Voice, recurring role
2021–2023	The Ghost and Molly McGee	Maxwell Davenport	Voice, 6 episodes
2021–2023	Ten Year Old Tom	Neighbor Rick	Voice, 4 episodes
2022	Lego Star Wars: Summer Vacation	Wick Cooper	Voice, Disney+ special
2023	HouseBroken	Pony Ferrari	Voice, episode: "Who's a Party Pony?"
2024–2026	Rock Paper Scissors	Paper	Main voice role
2024–2025	Animal Control	Patrick Shaw	5 episodes
2025	Family Guy		Voice, episode: "Row v. Wade"
2025	Universal Basic Guys	King Tony	Voice, episode: "Medieval Knights"
2026	The Terrors of Jordan Mendoza	Dr. Hanley	Episode: "Found a Leprechaun"
2026	The Rookie	Arthur Grimm	Episode: “Survive the Streets”

=== Web ===
Year	Title	Role	Notes
2019	Ryan Hansen Solves Crimes on Television	Himself	Episode: "For Your Inconsideration"

Acting roles
Preceded by Jack Lemmon	Felix Ungar actor from The Odd Couple; 2015 – '17	Most recent
Preceded by Jason Harris Katz	Voice of Top Cat; 2021 – present	Incumbent
