= Robert Ben Garant =

American screenwriter, producer, director, comedian and actor

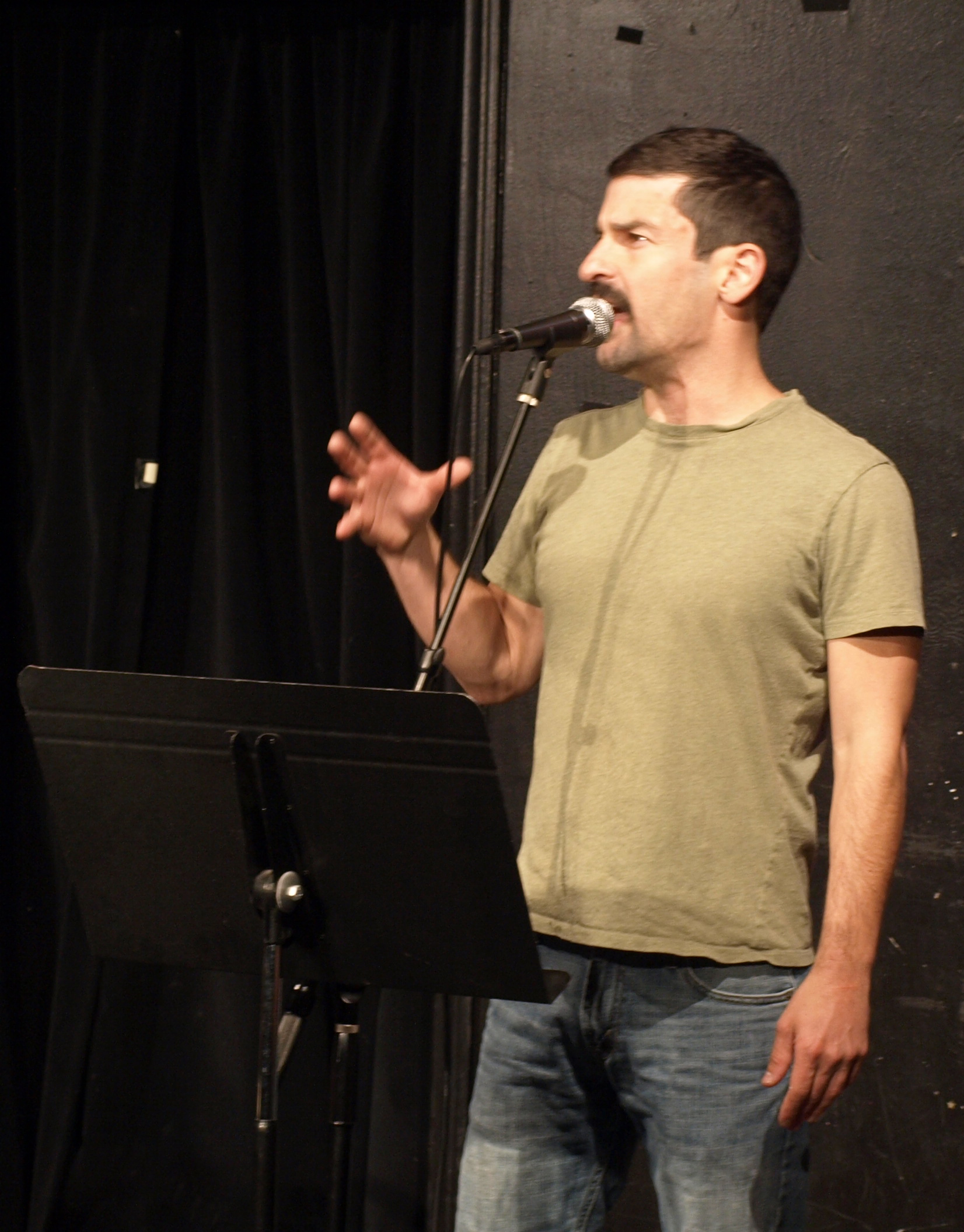
- Garant performing at the UCB theater in Los Angeles in March 2009
- Occupations: Screenwriter; producer; director; comedian; actor
- Years active: 1992–present

Robert Ben Garant, credited earlier in his career as Ben Garant, is an American screenwriter, producer, director, comedian and actor. He has a long professional relationship with Thomas Lennon and Kerri Kenney-Silver from their time in the sketch comedy troupe The State, then on the sketch-comedy show The State, the cop show spoof Reno 911!, and numerous screenwriting collaborations.

== Early life ==
Garant grew up in Farragut, Tennessee. He lived in New York City for several years and attended the Tisch School of the Arts at New York University. While at NYU he was a member of sketch comedy troupe The State.

== Career ==
Garant was a cast member on the 1993–1995 MTV sketch comedy series The State. In 2003, Garant, Thomas Lennon and Kerri Kenney-Silver, all members of The State, created the mockumentary show Reno 911!, which aired on Comedy Central; Garant appeared on the show as Deputy Travis Junior.

Garant and Lennon are frequent writing partners, and have written several successful screenplays together, including the Night at the Museum films. Their films have earned over $1.4 billion in box office revenue alone.

Garant and Lennon created and starred in a 2010 sitcom pilot for NBC called The Strip. However, it was not ordered as a series. Later in 2010, Garant and Lennon created a pilot for FX called USS Alabama, a sci-fi/comedy set a thousand years in the future, aboard a United Nations peacekeeping spaceship, the U.S.S. Alabama. This pilot was not picked up either.

In 2011, Garant and Lennon released a book about their careers called Writing Movies for Fun and Profit: How We Made a Billion Dollars at The Box Office and You Can Too!

== Filmography ==
=== Television ===
Year	Title	Director	Writer	Executive Producer	Creator	Notes
1993-1995	The State	No	Yes	No	Yes	
1997–1999	Viva Variety	No	Yes	No	Yes	
2003-2022	Reno 911!	Yes	Yes	Yes	Yes	Directed 38 episodes
2016-2019	Bajillion Dollar Propertie$	Yes	No	Yes	No	Directed 4 episodes
2021	Reno 911! The Hunt for QAnon	Yes	Yes	Yes	Yes	TV movie
2022	Reno 911! It's a Wonderful Heist	No	No	Yes	No	TV movie

Acting roles

Year	Title	Role	Notes
1993-1995	The State		
1997–1999	Viva Variety		
2003-2022	Reno 911!		
2010	Archer	Rudi (Voice)	Episode "Honeypot"
2011-2025	Bob's Burgers	Critter/Torpedo/Mitchell	6 episodes
2014	The Aquabats! Super Show!	Kitty Litter (voice)	Episode "Kitty Litter!"
2016-2019	Bajillion Dollar Propertie$	Gio	9 episodes

=== Film ===
Year	Title	Director	Writer	Producer
2004	Taxi	No	Yes	No
2005	The Pacifier	No	Yes	No
2005	Herbie: Fully Loaded	No	Yes	No
2006	Let's Go to Prison	No	Yes	No
2006	Night at the Museum	No	Yes	No
2007	Balls of Fury	Yes	Yes	No
2007	Reno 911!: Miami	Yes	Yes	No
2009	Night at the Museum: Battle of the Smithsonian	No	Yes	No
2013	Hell Baby	Yes	Yes	Yes
2014	Jessabelle	No	Yes	No
2014	Rocky and Bullwinkle	No	Yes	No
2014	Night at the Museum: Secret of the Tomb	No	Yes	No
2016	The Veil	No	Yes	Yes
2017	Baywatch	No	Story	No
TBA	Casket Girls	No	Yes	No

Acting roles

Year	Title	Role	Notes
2007	Reno 911!: Miami	Deputy Travis Junior	
2009	Night at the Museum: Battle of the Smithsonian	Orville Wright	Uncredited
2013	Hell Baby	Father Sebastian	
2014	Rocky and Bullwinkle	Narrator	
2019	Raising Buchanan	Lancaster Guy	

Special thanks

- Paws of Fury: The Legend of Hank (2022)
