= The State (American TV series) =

1994–1995 American TV series

- Genre: Sketch comedy
- Starring: Kevin Allison; Michael Ian Black; Robert Ben Garant; Todd Holoubek; Michael Patrick Jann; Kerri Kenney-Silver; Thomas Lennon; Joe Lo Truglio; Ken Marino; Michael Showalter; David Wain
- Theme music composer: Craig Wedren
- Opening theme: "Boys and Girls – Action" by Craig Wedren
- Composers: Theodore Shapiro; Craig Wedren
- Country of origin: United States
- Original language: English
- No. of seasons: 4
- No. of episodes: 25 (list of episodes)

Production
- Executive producers: Jonathan K. Bendis; Steven Starr
- Producers: Michael Patrick Jann; Mark Perez; Jim Sharp; David Wain
- Running time: approx. 30 minutes per episode

Original release
- Network: MTV (seasons 1–4); CBS (special)
- Release: January 21, 1994 – October 27, 1995

Related
- Viva Variety; Reno 911! Stella; Michael & Michael Have Issues

The State is an American sketch comedy television series originally broadcast on MTV from 1994 to 1995. The show combined bizarre characters and scenarios to present sketches that won the favor of its target teenaged audience. The cast consisted of comedy troupe The State, who were 11 comedians who created, acted, wrote, directed and edited the show. In various combinations, the former members of The State have continued to collaborate over the years, with alumni playing major creative, directing and acting roles in a number of notable projects including Reno 911! and Wet Hot American Summer.

Several memorable characters were created for the show, and for a short time their catchphrases entered into the vernacular. Often, the cast would appear as themselves and address the audience to promote fake contests or to deliver mock public service announcements. Much like Monty Python's Flying Circus, The State's sketches were sometimes linked to each other in some way: a punchline or image that ended one sketch often provided a lead-in to the next.

After years of legal issues related to the soundtrack to many of the episodes, the series was released on DVD on July 14, 2009. A State film featuring all of the original troupe members was planned, but faced delays due to the 2007–2008 screenwriters strike, and the project never came to fruition.

== About the show ==
"Contrary to popular belief", says the troupe's official FAQ, "the show was never canceled." For a variety of reasons, including network television politics, The State decided to pursue other interests and "establish ourselves as an entity that exists apart from any particular employer or TV Network." On the series' DVD commentary, cast members revealed that MTV had offered a contract guarantee for 65 additional shows, but the cast turned it down to leave to CBS, against their agent's advice.

== Episodes ==
Season	Episodes	Originally released		
Season	Episodes	First released	Last released	Network
1	5	January 21, 1994	February 18, 1994	MTV
2	6	July 10, 1994	August 21, 1994	MTV
3	6	December 24, 1994	February 11, 1995	MTV
4	7	August 12, 1995	August 26, 1995	MTV
Special	1	October 27, 1995		CBS

== Reviews ==
The State received mixed reviews from critics during its original run. In January 1994, the Daily News TV guide called the show "so terrible it deserves to be studied". Entertainment Weekly called the show "significantly less than sporadically funny" and gave it a C− rating.

The show has fared better with critics in the years since it went off the air, however; TV.com says many of The State's "sketches remain funny to this day and — unlike most shows of the age — would not be considered dated or stale... Even the few mediocre sketches on the show are better than 99% of today's sketch comedy."

== Cast ==
- Kevin Allison
- Michael Ian Black
- Ben Garant
- Todd Holoubek
- Michael Patrick Jann
- Kerri Kenney
- Thomas Lennon
- Joe Lo Truglio
- Ken Marino
- Michael Showalter
- David Wain

== Theme song ==
The opening sequence was set to "Boys and Girls – Action" by Craig Wedren of Shudder To Think and Eli Janney of Girls Against Boys. The song is built around samples of The Nation of Ulysses songs "The Kingdom of Heaven Must Be Taken By Storm" ("Boys and girls!") and "The Hickey Underworld" ("Action! Action!").

== Recurring characters ==
The cast (notably David Wain) have said that they were not interested in creating recurring characters, but were repeatedly pressured by the network to emulate Saturday Night Live in this manner. In turn, some of the recurring characters were made as satires of recurring characters (notably, "Louie" was made to satisfy network pressures for both a recurring character and catch-phrases, according to the casts' DVD commentary track).

Doug	Played by Michael Showalter. A high school student and wannabe rebel who pointlessly struggles against surprisingly permissive and understanding authority figures. Doug's catchphrase is a wan "I'm outta heeeerrre." A memorable sketch has Doug's father Don (Lennon) questioning him on his drug use. Doug replies "Drugs?! Hey man, I'm Doug, not Bob Dylan." His father asks him if he even knows who Bob Dylan is. Doug replies "No...but I know he died of drugs." Doug's father then tells him Bob Dylan is alive and well, and that he in fact produced his last three albums, to which Doug replies, "Oh, you mean Uncle Robert?" He would often be followed by a group of friends (usually played by Ken Marino, Kerry Kenney, Michael Patrick Jann, and Joe Lo Truglio), who would inevitably find the authority figure cooler than Doug and decide to hang with them instead. Doug's father, Don, is played by Thomas Lennon and appears in the "Doug" sketches in 102, 204 and 305. Appearances: 102: "Doug & Dad", "Captain Monterey Jack: Lights", 103: "Captain Monterey Jack: Shoes", 106: "Doug & Principal", "Captain Monterey Jack: Cheese", 204: "Doug III", 302: "Kabuki Doug", 305: "Doug IV"
Louie	Played by Ken Marino. One of the more ironic characters on the show, parodying sketch comedy characters who rely on catchphrases. Louie is a genial fellow with a strong desire to dip his "balls" (actual golf balls, although the innuendo was certainly intentional) in various things. His catchphrase, naturally, is a very enthusiastic "I wanna dip my balls in it!" One of the more memorable Louie sketches placed him at The Last Supper, in which Louie and his catchphrase distract the Twelve Apostles from Jesus' speech concerning his fate. Louie would often tire of the gag halfway through the sketch, because he feels that it has "been done", but would be encouraged by the loving crowd to continue. The punch line was that Louie would tell them they knew what he was going to say, they would say they didn't but would then shout it along with him. According to DVD commentaries, "Louie" was originally a character who would only appear one time. MTV wanted a recurring character with a catchphrase, and the sketch was a "fuck you" to executives. According to a DVD commentary, "Louie" became a recurring character because "We liked it!" Appearances: 102: "Louie", 103: "Louie II", 302: "Kabuki Doug", 303: "Louie & the Last Supper", 305: "Doug IV"
Barry and Levon	Played by Thomas Lennon and Michael Ian Black, respectively. Suave swingers of ambiguous sexual orientation. Their most notable moment was a sketch in which they had purchased and prepared $240 worth of pudding, which sat in a pile that they proceeded to sweet-talk and dance with. This is another sketch which fell victim to a compromised soundtrack when released on iTunes. It was originally accompanied with "Sexual Healing" by Marvin Gaye. It also appears that the music was played on set and recorded directly into the master, as, according to the DVD commentary, the dialogue between Barry and Levon has been overdubbed. According to a DVD commentary, "$240 Worth of Pudding" was written by Black and Lennon. Appearances: 104: "$240 Worth of Pudding", 203: "Barry and Levon", 302: "Kabuki Doug", 303: "Deathfight 5000", 306: "Planet Groovy"
Old-Fashioned Guy	Played by Thomas Lennon. A country gentleman who clings to antiquated, sometimes primitive beliefs, which seem absurd in modern society. "Call me old fashioned ... but I think we should worship the sun and moon as powerful gods, and fear them." Appearances: 102: "Old Fashioned Guy 1", "Old Fashioned Guy 2", 106: "Old Fashioned Guy", 107: "Old Fashioned Guy"
James Dixon	Played by Thomas Lennon. A conniving, hard-driving ex-Hollywood agent who lands himself very unlikely careers (high school guidance counselor, Catholic priest, Jedi talent agent) and applies his showbiz tactics to his new positions. "You can't bargain with God. But you can bargain with me, and I can bargain with God." According to DVD commentaries, the character was based on the group's agent, James Dixon. Appearances: 107: "James Dixon: Guidance Counselor", 201: "James Dixon: Power Priest", 313: "Dixon: Jedi Talent Agency"
Barry Toink	Played by Joe Lo Truglio. An extremely wordy high school jock. He is the focus of the season 2 sketch "Bookworm" in which he tries to find the word for "one who loves books" so that he can make fun of a nerd in the cafeteria. He is one of the recurring characters, along with Doug, Louie, and Barry and Levon, featured in "Kabuki Doug." Appearances: 103: "Antonio", 203: "Bookworm", 302: "Kabuki Doug"
Captain Monterey Jack	Played by Michael Ian Black. A nonsense-spewing motivational speaker, a parody of similar anti-drug or alcohol abuse spots aired on MTV at the time. "And remember, bbbbring, bbbring... Hello, cheese? NO! Cheese can't dial a phone." Doug (see above) made his first appearances in the Capt. Monterey Jack sketches. Appearances: 102: "Captain Monterey Jack: Lights", 103: "Captain Monterey Jack: Shoes", 106: "Captain Monterey Jack: Cheese"
The Jew, the Italian, and the Redhead Gay	Played by David Wain, Ken Marino, and Kevin Allison, respectively. Good-naturedly broad stereotypes, introduced after an announcement from The State that in the future, they would "try to avoid stereotyping of any kind". The three are at first roommates, later crime-fighters in the style of Charlie's Angels who track down villains based on additional stereotypes (they succeed in catching an Irish criminal after finding him at a bar). According to a DVD commentary, the original sketch was written by Marino, Allison, and Wain. Appearances: 301: "The Jew, the Italian, and the Redhead Gay", 308: "Jew II, pt. 1", "Jew II, pt. 2"
Inbred Brothers	Emmett played by Thomas Lennon. Lyle played by Ben Garant. Two very stupid inbred hillbilly brothers who spend a lot of time hitting themselves on the head. What would have been the first "Inbred Brothers" sketch was shot for season one but never aired. Catchphrase-( Emmett:) "What am I doin'?" Appearances: 205: "Inbred Brothers", 311: "Inbred Brothers - Army"
Monkeys Do It	Joey played by Joe Lo Truglio, Tony played by Ken Marino, Anthony played by Michael Showalter, Joseph played by Michael Ian Black, Tony's mother played by Thomas Lennon, Gina played by Kerri Kenney, Sherry played by Todd Holoubek. Tony, Anthony, Joseph and Joey are four Italian-American teenage friends who hang out in Tony's basement. In the first sketch, they are bored on their summer vacation. Joseph suggests they go to the zoo to watch the monkeys "do it." They go on to get in some digs at Anthony's sister (a "beautiful girl with a very hairy face") and debate over whether or not penguins are "natural" (Anthony claims they were chemically man-made "like The Incredible Hulk" and that the Bible never mentions penguins). Tony's sister Gina and her best friend Sherry come downstairs, demanding that the boys take them along or else Gina will tell their mother about Tony's "perversion." Gina and Tony bicker, then everyone else starts shouting, until Gina and Tony's mother comes down to see what the ruckus is. After Gina tells Ma that the boys were planning to go to the zoo to watch the monkeys "do it," Ma insists they all have "dirty minds" and that the monkeys don't "do it" - rather, they "make love." She then describes how the monkeys would do such a thing, then asks Tony to grab her video camera and Joey to get her car so they can go to the zoo and "watch the monkeys make amore." The characters were reprised later that season in a Thanksgiving-themed sketch, with several additional characters. According to the DVD commentary, the original sketch was written by Marino, Black, and possibly a forgotten co-writer/co-writers (possibly either Lo Truglio or Showalter) Appearances: 301: "Monkeys Do It", 307: "Monkeys Do It II"

== Home media ==
The first season of The State, digitally re-mastered along with a new musical score, was made available on Apple’s iTunes Store on September 26, 2006. Several episodes were also made available on Amazon Unbox as well as the Xbox Live Marketplace.

A DVD box set was released July 2009.
