= Wanderlust (2012 film) =

2012 comedy film directed by David Wain

- Theatrical release poster
- Directed by: David Wain
- Written by: David Wain; Ken Marino
- Produced by: Judd Apatow; Ken Marino; Paul Rudd; David Wain
- Starring: Paul Rudd; Jennifer Aniston; Justin Theroux; Malin Åkerman; Kathryn Hahn; Lauren Ambrose; Alan Alda
- Cinematography: Michael Bonvillain
- Edited by: David Moritz; Robert Nassau
- Music by: Craig Wedren
- Production companies: A Hot Dog Productions; Apatow Productions; Relativity Media
- Distributed by: Universal Pictures
- Release dates: February 16, 2012 (Mann Village Theatre); February 24, 2012 (United States)
- Running time: 98 minutes
- Country: United States
- Language: English
- Budget: $35 million
- Box office: $24.2 million

Wanderlust is a 2012 American comedy film directed by David Wain, written by Wain and Ken Marino, and produced by Wain, Judd Apatow and Paul Rudd. The film stars Jennifer Aniston and Rudd as a married couple who try to escape modern society by finding themselves on a commune in Georgia, after the economy crashes down on their dreams in New York City. The film also stars Justin Theroux, Malin Åkerman, Kathryn Hahn, Lauren Ambrose, and Alan Alda. Wanderlust premiered at the Mann Village Theatre on February 16, 2012 and was released by Universal Pictures on February 24, 2012. The film received mixed reviews from critics and was a box office bomb, grossing $24.2 million against a $35 million budget.

== Plot ==
George and Linda Gergenblatt are an urban married couple who purchase a micro-loft in New York after much hesitation. George is expecting a promotion while Linda is trying to sell a documentary to HBO. Soon after purchasing their home, George learns that his company has folded, overnight, while HBO rejects Linda's documentary. With both out of work, they are forced to sell their apartment and drive to Atlanta to live with George's arrogant brother Rick and his wife Marisa after Rick offers George a job.

After many hours on the highway, Linda demands they stop to rest. The closest place to stop appears to be a bed and breakfast hotel named Elysium. After exiting the highway, as they approach, they are surprised to see a naked man walking ahead of them. He approaches them. Startled and apprehensive, George tries to back up to the highway, but accidentally flips the car over. The nude man, Wayne Davidson, helps them out of the car, and they are forced to stay at the hotel. They meet several colorful guests and then go to bed. While trying to sleep, they are distracted by noises downstairs. When they investigate, they learn that Elysium is a hippie commune. They meet various eccentric residents of Elysium, including Seth, Eva, and Elysium's owner Carvin. George and Linda spend the night feeling more alive than before. In the morning, everyone helps flip the car back upright so they can leave, as Seth urges them to stay, but they continue on to Atlanta.

George and Linda arrive at Rick's house and find the atmosphere chaotic. George quickly reaches a breaking point with Rick and takes Linda back to Elysium, where they are welcomed back. George is excited about the simpler lifestyle while Linda is hesitant. They decide to stay and give the place a two-week trial run. After a few days, Linda starts feeling enlightened after drinking some drug-laced tea in the truth circle, while George begins having second thoughts. George and Linda soon learn that 'free love' is strongly encouraged as Seth and Eva want to seduce Linda and George, respectively. Both George and Linda rebuff the notion of free love, and several crazy situations arise during that period, bizarre and otherwise.

At the same time, Elysium is being targeted by property developers to build a casino on the property, as title to the property is disputed, and Carvin has misplaced the deed to the land. After the developers arrive with a bulldozer, to make a television reporting crew take more interest, Linda scares them off by flashing them her breasts, and many of the other residents join her, which gets sensationalized coverage, and halts the proceeding. Linda is lauded as a hero by the commune. The two weeks are up, and George demands that they leave, saying that if they stay, they would have to give in to 'free love'. Linda wants to stay and has sex with Seth. George is pressured to have sex with Eva, but he becomes uncomfortable and drives her away with his awkward and bizarre behavior. The next morning, George reaches a breaking point, again, stating that he dislikes the rules of Elysium and wants to leave. Linda wants to stay, so George goes back to Rick's house alone.

Seth believes he has found his soul mate in Linda and searches for the deed to Elysium, which he finds and sells to the property developers, for $11,000, to start a new life with Linda, betraying the commune. A child from the commune witnesses the burning of the deed by Seth and the man who wants to build the casino. Seth tells Linda he wants them to leave Elysium behind, together, and that the others can look after themselves. Linda refuses.

In the meantime, George realizes he loves Linda and comes back to find her, getting into a fight with Seth while the commune looks on and tries to help 'non-violently'. The child who witnessed the burning of the deed by Seth tells the commune what happened and George punches Seth in the jaw.

In the aftermath, the news show that visited Elysium does a follow-up story about the commune. George and Linda start a publishing company, with their first book being a political thriller novel written by Wayne. The novel is then fast-tracked into a film adaptation starring Ray Liotta. Carvin reclaims his rights to Elysium after he is reunited with all the original founders of Elysium, one of whom had another copy of the deed.

In a post-credits scene, Marisa is a cast member of the television reality show The Real Housewives of Atlanta.

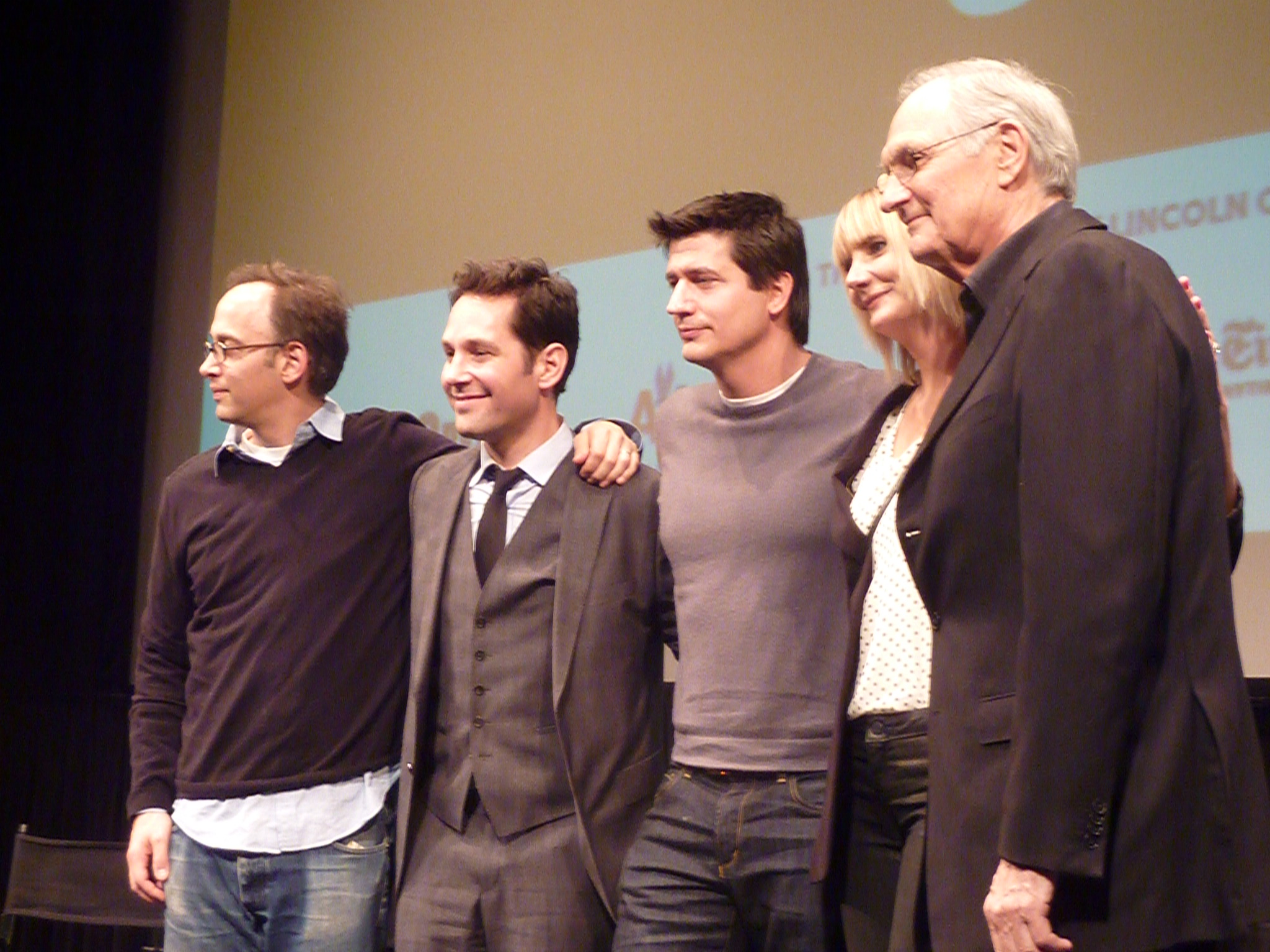
The cast of Wanderlust at a screening at Film Society of Lincoln Center, 2012

== Cast ==
- Paul Rudd as George Gergenblatt
- Jennifer Aniston as Linda Gergenblatt
- Justin Theroux as Seth
- Michaela Watkins as Marisa Gergenblatt
- Malin Åkerman as Eva
- Lauren Ambrose as Almond Cohen
- Joe Lo Truglio as Wayne Davidson
- Alan Alda as Carvin Wiggins
- Kathryn Hahn as Karen
- Jessica St. Clair as Deena Schuster
- Ken Marino as Rick Gergenblatt
- Jordan Peele as Rodney Wilson
- Kerri Kenney-Silver as Kathy
- Linda Lavin as Shari
- Keegan-Michael Key as Marcy's Flunkie
- David Wain, Michael Ian Black, and Michael Showalter, all cameo as news reporters, credited as themselves.
- Ray Liotta as himself
- Trisha Paytas as Wayne’s wife (uncredited)

== Production ==
David Wain began chronicling the film's production and pre-production on his blog on May 21, 2010. Most of the production took place in Georgia. Additional material was filmed in New York City and Los Angeles.

=== Filming ===
Principal photography took place in a number of places in Georgia: the Gwinnett Diner in Lawrenceville (which was also used for a scene in the film Road Trip); a subdivision called Miramonte Way off Ozora Road in the Lawrenceville, Georgia area; and in Habersham County, off of New Liberty Road.

== Release ==
The film premiered at Mann Village Theatre in Los Angeles on February 16, 2012, and was theatrically released on February 24, 2012. It was the last film released by Universal Pictures to use the 1997 logo, accompanied by its fanfare by Jerry Goldsmith, before being replaced by a new logo, which debuted alongside The Lorax (2012). During its first weekend Wanderlust opened at #8, with $6.5 million from 2,002 locations. Given its poor debut, it was considered a box-office flop. After six weeks, it concluded its theatrical run with North American domestic gross of $17,288,155 and international gross of $4,162,198.

== Reception ==
=== Critical response ===
Wanderlust received mixed reviews from critics. Rotten Tomatoes gives the film a 58% rating based on 144 reviews, with the site's consensus stating, "It isn't always as funny as it should be, but Wanderlust benefits from an extremely talented cast and some of David Wain's most confident, assured work behind the camera." On Metacritic, which assigns a normalized rating out of 100 based on reviews from critics, the film has a score of 53 based on 34 reviews, indicating "mixed or average reviews". Audiences surveyed by CinemaScore gave it a B− grade. Entertainment Weekly gave it an A−.

=== Accolades ===
| Year | Award | Category | Recipient | Result | Ref. |
|---|---|---|---|---|---|
| 2013 | 39th People's Choice Awards | Favorite Comedic Movie Actress | Jennifer Aniston | Won | |

== Home media ==
Wanderlust was released on DVD and Blu-ray Disc on June 19, 2012. The last reported gross for the DVD was $3,807,225. The Blu-ray contained the extras Wanderlust: The Bizarro Cut, and an audio commentary by director David Wain, co-writer/actor Ken Marino, and actor Paul Rudd. The video extras consist of a gag reel, a "Line-O-Rama", and making-of featurettes.

== See also ==
- Wanderlust
- The Object of My Affection, a 1998 film starring Alda, Aniston and Rudd, in which Rudd's character is named "George"
