= Todd Holoubek =

American actor

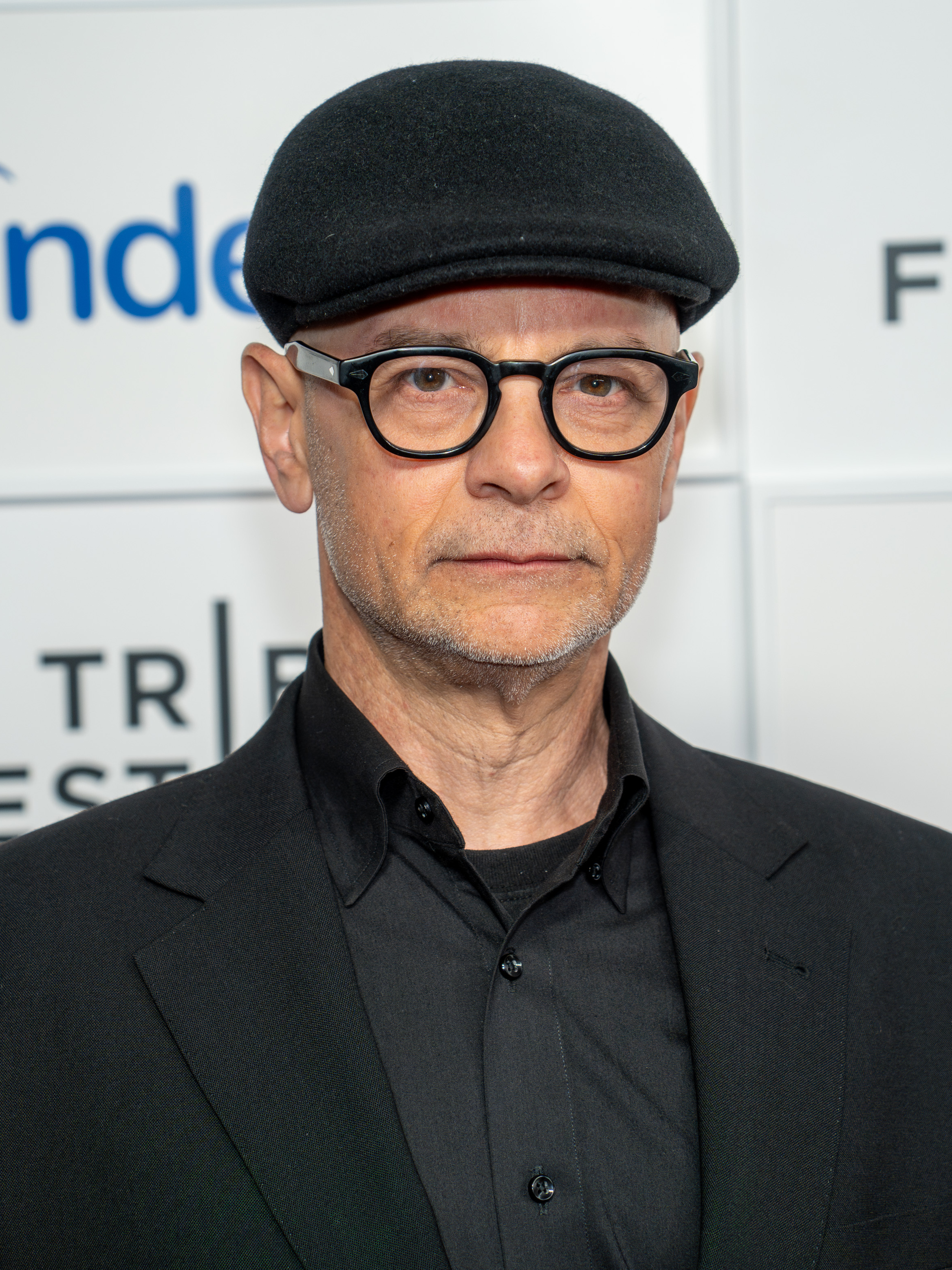
- Holoubek in 2025
- Born: September 10, 1969 (age 56)
- Occupations: Academic, actor, comedian, sketch-comedy writer

Todd Holoubek (born September 10, 1969) is an American comedian, actor, and writer.

== Education and academic career ==
He is an alumnus and an adjunct-faculty member of the Interactive Telecommunications Program at the Tisch School of the Arts of New York University in New York City. He is also a former NYU-resident researcher.

== Career ==
Holoubek has made appearances in several film and television productions. His most notable work is acting in and writing for The State (1993–1995), a sketch-comedy television series on the MTV television channel.

Holoubek performed in smaller shows after The State and joined the troupe in 2009 for two live reunion shows.

He appeared in the film The Ten.
