= Viva Variety =

American sketch comedy series

- Genre: Sketch comedy Variety
- Created by: Robert Ben Garant; Thomas Lennon; Michael Ian Black
- Starring: Thomas Lennon; Kerri Kenney; Michael Ian Black
- Theme music composer: Glen Roven
- Country of origin: United States
- Original language: English

Production
- Executive producers: Kent Alterman; Paul Miller; Jim Sharp
- Running time: 22 minutes

Original release
- Network: Comedy Central
- Release: April 1, 1997 – October 20, 1998

Related
- The State

Viva Variety is an American sketch comedy series that aired on Comedy Central from April 1, 1997 to October 1998. The series satirizes European variety shows.

== Overview ==
The show stars Thomas Lennon as Meredith Laupin, Kerri Kenney as the former Mrs. (Agatha) Laupin, and Michael Ian Black as the hip character Johnny Blue Jeans. In addition to comedy sketches, the show featured musical guests and various performers, including Ben Stiller. Periodically, a troupe of women called “The Swimsuit Squad” would dance much like the “Fly Girls” on In Living Color.

The show's premise was derived from a sketch from The State called "The Mr. and Former Mrs. Laupin Variety Program," and the show featured several fellow members of the comedy troupe.

=== Sketches ===
Though Mr. Laupin, the former Mrs. Laupin, and Johnny Blue Jeans were themselves characters, the show did not use recurring characters or feature impersonations. Often, the troupe would address or involve the audience directly; in one theme of this vein, Mr. Laupin and the former Mrs. Laupin would do an old-fashioned plug for their fake sponsor during actual airtime.

One in particular had the former Mrs. Laupin asking consumers to ignore or fix errors on their sponsor's products, including a cereal, “Sweety Balls,” in which the second e was replaced with an a.

The other common sketch theme was a game show with an odd premise, such as “Plant or Animal,” where an audience member was asked to attribute a few seconds-long recording to either an animal or Robert Plant. This proved more difficult than one might anticipate.

Another sketch of this style was “Klingon or Galliano,” where an audience member was shown runway models in various outfits and was asked if they were wearing costumes for Klingons from the science fiction series Star Trek or made by fashion designer John Galliano. This also proved more difficult than one might anticipate. The participant's consolation prize of a tribble coat, presented by an allergic Johnny Blue Jeans, made light of Galliano's controversial use of fur.

=== Reunions ===
On January 29, 2011, at the Eureka Theatre in San Francisco, California a two-show reunion of Viva Variety was held as part of the 10th annual San Francisco Sketchfest. Lennon, Kenney-Silver and Black reunited for a live, on-stage performance of Viva Variety, with a guest appearance by State alumnus Robert Ben Garant. These sold-out shows included video highlights from the original show on the "jumbotron" and new, improvised material by the cast. Skits included: a game of "Thomas vs. George", where an audience member had to guess which Jefferson was being described, Johnny Blue Jeans ranked the Police Academy movies in order of cinematic importance, Mr. Laupin pretended to surf while letting inappropriate joke waves pass by, and the former Mrs. Laupin sold Perma-ham as only she can.

A second reunion was staged as part of the 2023 SF Sketchfest on January 21, 2023, at the Great Star Theater in San Francisco. This show — staged as a live broadcast of an Italian morning radio show — included Ken Marino as the Bolognese radio host, David Wain as his sidekick Eddie, and Joe Lo Truglio as the former Mrs. Laupin's new fiancée Renee Zamboni (Canada's number one Corey Feldman impersonator). Songs included a tribute to Bill Cosby, a song about both Robin Williams and Pam Dawber, and a Buca di Beppo AI-generated hit. All of this happened while Chinatown celebrated Lunar New Year with Fireworks directly outside the theatre, making Mr. Laupin wonder aloud if we were all in a shelter-in-place situation inside the theatre.
