= Stella (comedy group) =

Comedy trio from the United States

Comedy career
- Years active: 1997-present (though possibly on hiatus)
- Medium: Television; Stand-up; Web series
- Genres: Surreal humour; anti-humor; black comedy; farce; alternative comedy; improvisational comedy; satire / parody; cringe comedy; sketch comedy; physical comedy; blue comedy
- Members: Michael Ian Black; Michael Showalter; David Wain

Stella is a comedy trio or comedy troupe consisting of Michael Showalter, Michael Ian Black, and David Wain. The group formed in 1997 as a weekly nightclub comedy attraction, performing at New York City nightclub Fez from 1997 until the club's closing in February 2005. Stella soon gained a wider cult following after a series of self-produced shorts known as the Stella shorts were released in limited quantities on DVD beginning in 2002. The trio later created and starred in a Stella television series in 2005. Now known for their unique blend of potentially mainstream comedy and surrealist humor, Stella has garnered a small but dedicated fanbase.

== Beginnings ==
Michael Showalter, Michael Ian Black and David Wain met at New York University where they all participated in the school's improv comedy group, Sterile Yak. Other members of Sterile Yak include Thomas Lennon, Kerri Kenney-Silver, Robert Ben Garant, and Joe Lo Truglio (Reno 911!). Those members, along with Showalter, Black, and Wain, broke away to form their own comedy troupe, The New Group, which would go on to become the MTV series, The State. The members of Stella started doing comedy shows at a jazz club called Fez in downtown New York City. Stella performed weekly at Fez and were introduced by their house band called Mr. Blue & The Urban Sonata.

== The name ==
After The State ended, Black, Showalter, and Wain decided to join together and form a stand-up comedy troupe. The group originally performed under the name Midnight Expressions. They changed the name to Stella when they got their first gig at the New York City nightclub, Fez, because the manager who hired them was pregnant at the time, and Stella was to be the name of her daughter. (www.davidwain.com), (The History of Stella)

== Short films ==
From 1998 to 2004 the troupe produced, wrote, and starred in 27 short films, originally intended for screenings at the group's live stage shows. They quickly became popular after being hosted on the internet through CollegeHumor and have since been distributed freely online by fans on video sharing websites such as YouTube and Dailymotion.

Some of the actors to guest star in the shorts include Sam Rockwell, Paul Rudd, Elizabeth Banks, Julie Bowen, Zach Galifianakis, and Bradley Cooper, as well as several members of Stella's alma mater The State, such as Joe Lo Truglio.

On December 15, 2008, Stella premiered "Birthday", their first new short since 2004, on My Damn Channel, the website on which cast member David Wain had achieved much success with his show Wainy Days. Both Michael Ian Black, and Michael Showalter appeared in several episodes of Wainy Days. Michael Ian Black played a waiter in the episodes titled "A Woman's Touch," and "Walking Tour," and Michael Showalter played a character named "Landon" in the episode titled "Molly."

== Television ==
Before ever appearing on Comedy Central, Stella made a pilot to VH1 called Every Night. It was a late night talk show that included sketch comedy, improv, and material from the shortfilms. The show was not picked up by VH1.

Stella had two brief stints on Comedy Central, the first as a one-time Comedy Central Presents adaptation of their stage show in 2004.

In 2005, the network commissioned ten half-hour episodes from the group, as the television series Stella. The resulting episodes were a blend of jokes and vignettes from the Stella shorts combined with plenty of new material, with each episode having an actual plot or story arc holding it all together, a change of pace from the short films which would frequently derail themselves entirely from any semblance of a storyline and make little effort to resolve or arc. As well as starring in the series, the troupe wrote every episode, with Wain directing three. Comedy Central released the complete series on DVD in 2006 which included the complete half-hour Comedy Central Presents special, The History of Stella, and other supplemental features.

Additionally, Showalter and Black returned to Comedy Central in July 2009 in a new show entitled Michael and Michael Have Issues, which ran for 7 episodes before being cancelled in 2010.

Shout! Factory released a live DVD of the troupe in 2009 titled Stella: Live In Boston.

== Film ==
Though Michael Showalter, Michael Ian Black and David Wain have yet to appear in a feature film as their Stella alter-egos, the three have frequently collaborated on a number of feature films, including:

- Wet Hot American Summer (2001) – Directed by Wain, co-written by Showalter and Wain, starring Showalter and Black
- The Baxter (2005) – Written, directed by and starring Showalter. Black and Wain both have supporting acting roles.
- The Ten (2007) – Directed by Wain, co-written by Wain and Ken Marino, starring Showalter, Black and Wain in supporting roles.
- Role Models (2008) – Directed by Wain, co-written by Wain and Marino, starring a wide variety of Stella contributors.
- Wanderlust (2012) – Directed by Wain, co-written by Wain and Ken Marino, starring Showalter, Black and Wain in supporting roles.
- They Came Together (2014) – Directed by Wain, written by Showalter, starring Black and Wain in supporting roles.

An exception to this is an outtake from Wet Hot American Summer, in which the trio can be seen in the background of a scene, wearing their Stella attire and humping the body of a downed turkey hunter played by Zak Orth as a reference to the first Stella short, "Turkey Hunting".

The three have also appeared in the movie Reno 911!: Miami. Showalter and Black appeared as tattoo artists, while Wain played a plumber.

The group filmed their December 11, 2008 performance in Boston at the Wilbur Theatre for Shout Factory's Live In Boston DVD.

== Comedic style ==
David Wain once said about Stella's comedy, "We try not to get too analytical or introspective about our material or what we're doing, we just try to continue to do the best, funniest material we can." (Boston Globe 2004) Critics have described Stella's television series as an "off the cuff Marx Brothers-meets-Monty Python." (Rolling Stone) The members of Stella would admit that their short lived T.V. series had to be toned down tremendously, so much so that their brand of comedy was initially an issue for producers at Comedy Central. Before Stella was given the green light on their television series, a producer asked David Wain if they can be funny without dildos. (History of Stella) A noted aspect of Stella's stand-up routine is when the members of Stella begin to argue with each other onstage. Michael Ian Black once referred to it as, "professional bickering," which some have compared to a "postmodern Smothers Brothers." (Boston Globe) Part of the reason why they do this is because it keeps the audience on their toes. Michael Showalter once said of their onstage bickering, "When people aren't sure if what they're watching is real or not, it kind of creates a tension. We have a certain amount of tension that's very ripe comedically." (Boston Globe)

== Frequent contributors ==
Stella is also known for casting actors they enjoy working with in many of their projects including:

- Elizabeth Banks (Wet Hot American Summer film and Netflix series, The Baxter, Stella shorts and TV series, Wainy Days, Role Models)
- Janeane Garofalo (Wet Hot American Summer film and series, The Ten, Stella shorts and TV series)
- Joe Lo Truglio (The State, Wet Hot American Summer and series, The Baxter, The Ten, Wanderlust, Stella shorts and TV series, Wainy Days, Role Models, Childrens Hospital)
- Ken Marino (The State, Wet Hot American Summer, The Baxter, The Ten, Wanderlust, Stella shorts and TV series, Wainy Days, Role Models, Childrens Hospital, They Came Together)
- A.D. Miles (Wet Hot American Summer and its prequel, The Baxter, The Ten, Stella shorts and TV Series, Wainy Days, Role Models, Childrens Hospital)
- Zak Orth (Wet Hot American Summer and its prequels, The Baxter, The Ten, Stella shorts and TV series, "Wainy Days", They Came Together)
- Andrea Rosen (The Baxter, The Ten, Stella TV series, Wainy Days)
- Paul Rudd (Wet Hot American Summer, The Baxter, The Ten, Wanderlust, Stella shorts and TV series, The Michael Showalter Showalter, Wainy Days)
- Nina Hellman (Wet Hot American Summer, The Ten, Wanderlust, Stella shorts and TV series, Wainy Days)
- Justin Theroux (The Baxter, The Ten, Wanderlust)
- Zach Galifianakis (Stella shorts and The Michael Showalter Showalter)
- Bradley Cooper (Stella shorts, Wet Hot American Summer and its prequel)

	The State (1993-1995)	Wet Hot American Summer (2001)	Stella shorts (1998-2002)	Stella (2005)	The Baxter (2005)	The Ten (2007)	Wainy Days (2007-2012)	The Michael Showalter Showalter (2007-2008)	Role Models (2008)	Childrens Hospital (2008-2016)	Party Down (2009-2010)	Michael and Michael Have Issues (2009)	Wanderlust (2012)	Burning Love (2012-2013)	They Came Together (2014)	Wet Hot American Summer: First Day of Camp (2015)	Another Period (2016)	Wet Hot American Summer: Ten Years Later (2017)	Medical Police (2020)
David Wain	Actor, writer, director, producer	Writer, director	Actor, writer, director	Actor, writer, director, producer	Actor	Actor, writer, director, producer	Actor, writer, director	Guest star	Actor, director, writer	Actor, director, writer	Director		Actor, director, writer	Actor	Actor, director, writer	Actor, director, writer, producer	Actor	Actor, director, writer, producer	Director, co-creator, producer
Michael Showalter	Actor, writer, director	Actor, writer	Actor, writer, director	Actor, writer, director, producer	Actor, writer, director	Actor	Actor	Host, writer		Actor, writer		Actor, writer, producer	Actor		Writer, producer	Actor, writer, producer		Actor, writer, producer	
Michael Ian Black	Actor, writer, director	Actor, writer	Actor, writer, director	Actor, writer, director, producer	Actor	Actor	Actor, writer, director	Guest star				Actor, writer, producer	Actor	Actor	Actor	Actor	Actor	Actor	
Elizabeth Banks		Actor	Actor	Actor	Actor		Actor		Actor							Actor		Actor	
Paul Rudd		Actor	Actor	Actor	Actor	Actor, producer	Actor	Guest star	Actor, writer		Writer, producer		Actor, producer	Actor	Actor	Actor		Actor	
Janeane Garofalo		Actor		Actor		Actor	Actor									Actor		Actor	
Joe Lo Truglio	Various	Actor	Actor	Actor	Actor	Actor	Actor		Actor	Actor	Actor		Actor	Actor		Actor		Actor	
Ken Marino	Various	Actor		Actor		Actor, writer, producer	Actor, writer, director		Actor, writer	Actor	Actor, director		Actor, writer, producer	Actor, writer, producer	Actor	Actor		Actor	Actor
A.D. Miles		Actor	Actor	Actor		Actor	Actor, writer, director		Actor	Actor	Actor					Actor		Actor	
Zak Orth		Actor	Actor	Actor	Actor		Actor					Actor			Actor	Actor		Actor	
Andrea Rosen			Actor	Actor	Actor	Actor						Actor							
Nina Hellman		Actor	Actor	Actor		Actor	Actor		Actor				Actor			Actor		Actor	
Justin Theroux					Actor	Actor							Actor						
Zach Galifianakis			Actor					Guest star											
Bradley Cooper		Actor	Actor													Actor			
Julie Bowen			Actor				Actor			Actor									
Thomas Lennon	Various						Actor			Actor	Actor			Actor			Actor		
Kerri Kenney-Silver	Various	Actor				Actor	Actor		Actor	Actor	Actor		Actor	Actor		Actor			
Rashida Jones				Actor		Actor, producer	Actor												
Christopher Meloni		Actor										Actor			Actor	Actor		Actor	
Seth Herzog			Actor	Actor	Actor	Actor			Actor										
Peter Salett		Actor, soundtrack	Actor		Soundtrack	Actor, soundtrack			Actor, soundtrack				Actor			Actor			
Michael Cera								Guest star		Actor						Actor			Actor
Jack McBrayer					Actor			Guest star		Actor					Actor				
H. Jon Benjamin		Actor				Actor						Actor				Actor		Actor	
Sam Rockwell			Actor	Actor															
Samantha Buck				Actor			Actor												
Megan Mullally							Actor			Actor	Actor								
Rob Corddry						Actor	Actor			Co-creator, actor	Actor			Actor					Co-creator, actor
Josh Charles				Actor			Actor									Actor		Actor	
Jason Sudeikis						Actor	Actor			Actor									
Lake Bell							Actor			Actor						Actor		Actor	Actor
Rob Huebel										Actor	Actor	Actor		Actor		Actor		Actor	Actor
Mather Zickel				Actor		Actor	Actor			Actor	Actor		Actor	Actor					
