= Stella shorts =

American short films (1998–2004)

The Stella shorts are a collection of short films by the comedy group Stella. The short films were produced and written by Michael Showalter, Michael Ian Black, and David Wain, who also star in the shorts with a number of guest actors. They have gained considerable popularity on the Internet, after initially appearing on CollegeHumor.

A collection of the short films, Stella Shorts 1998-2002, was released on DVD in 2002, but is no longer being produced. Since the short films are not currently available on DVD, they are often distributed freely online by fans on video sharing websites such as YouTube and Dailymotion. Many of the shorts can also be found on Stella's official website.

== Origin of the shorts ==
Stella collectively self-produced the short films from 1998 to 2004. The short films were originally shown at the group's live stage shows at nightclubs. The shorts spawned a number of running jokes and consistencies in the troupe's act, such as Michael Showalter's line "We don't have...this money" and group discussions about the nature of God. Many of the shorts contain raunchy humour, including various instances of people engaging in comical, non-graphic sex acts while being completely clothed or a sudden, casual appearance of a dildo.

Some of the actors to guest star in the shorts include Sam Rockwell, Paul Rudd, Elizabeth Banks, Bradley Cooper, Zach Galifianakis, Julie Bowen, and A.D. Miles, as well as several members of Stella's alma mater The State, such as Joe Lo Truglio. Comedian Zak Orth appears in many of the shorts as well.

== Chronological List of Stella shorts ==
- 1 - Turkey Hunting

The guys go on a botched turkey hunting trip before Thanksgiving.

- 2 - David's Cousin

David goes to the apartment of his long-lost cousin, but Michael and Michael wreak havoc upon arrival.

- 3 - College Reunion

David and Michael meet their old group of college friends at a cottage in the country for an emotional reunion.

- 4 - Day Off

The guys play with a Golden Retriever all day during their day off.

- 5 - Thanksgiving

The guys travel back in time to celebrate the first Thanksgiving with their pilgrim ancestors.

- 6 - Searching for Santa

The guys travel to Antarctica where they enlist a sherpa and search for the mythical figure.

- 7 - Office Party

David and Michael attend an office party which is unexpectedly taken hostage by terrorists.

- 8 - Christmas Caroling

The guys join a group of Christmas carolers in an ill-fated attempt to spread holiday cheer.

- 9 - Whiffleball

The guys enjoy a day at the park playing heated games of whiffleball.

- 10 - Audition

After seeing an ad for a garage band in search of members, the guys partake in a disastrous audition.

- 11 - Bored

Attempts to solve their boredom with a number of activities leave the guys strapped for cash. Sam Rockwell guest stars.

- 12 - Whodunit

The guys apathetically find themselves caught up in a classic whodunit situation at a dinner gathering thrown by Michael's wealthy uncle.

- 13 - Yoga

The trio joins an apartment-run yoga class, disrupting it spectacularly.

- 14 - Poker

In need of money after being mugged, the guys enter a shady poker game and soon find themselves in hot water.

- 15 - The Woods

A routine camping trip quickly spins into disaster as the trio finds themselves lost in the woods. Featuring Paul Rudd.

- 16 - Dickfish

A fishing trip takes a chaotic turn after the boys encounter a dangerous "dickfish" while illegally fishing in a marked-off pond. This short begins with a "retrospective" making-of type segment featuring interviews with the cast.

- 17 - Raking Leaves

The trio takes a job raking leaves for "Bill" (played by Bradley Cooper) but soon find themselves facing their greatest challenge yet.

- 18 - Awkward

David's "family friend" Enis (Zak Orth) comes to visit, but Michael and Michael's attempts at hospitality leave much to be desired.

- 19 - Pizza

Michael's self-inflicted exclusion from a trip to the pizzeria leaves him devastated.

- 20 - Moustache

The trio attempt to grow moustaches in a heated competition.

- 21 - Saturday

A lonely Michael fantasizes an elaborate, surreal interpretation of Chicago's "Saturday In The Park"

- 22 - Cat

The boys find a stray cat and take it in.

- 23 - One Shot

An attempt to do a crude, partial re-enactment of the "Awkward" short in a single, prolonged shot, featuring a "special guest".

- 24 - Truth

A rainy day inspires the boys to play "Truth" (as opposed to "Truth Or Dare"), leading them into a surreal, paranoid, nightmare-like journey of self-discovery.

- 25 - Friendship

The boys bond over a day outdoors.

- 26 - Dinner

A dialogue-less short featuring the trio having dinner together to the tunes of various styles of jazz.

- 27 - Backstage

The boys warm up backstage at the Fez nightclub in preparation for following Janeane Garofalo with their stand-up act.

- "Bar" was included on the Stella Season One DVD

== New MyDamnChannel Short ==
On December 15, 2008, Stella premiered "Birthday", their first new short since 2004, on My Damn Channel, the website on which cast member David Wain had achieved much success with his show Wainy Days. The short was originally shown during Stella's 2008 live tour.
