= Middle Aged Dad Jam Band =

American band

- Origin: Los Feliz, California
- Genres: Classic rock; jam band
- Years active: 2022–present
- Members: Frank Barrera; Jordan Katz; Ken Marino; Jon Spurney; Sweet Teddy P; David Wain; Henry Wain; Regulars: Kestrin Pantera; Allie Stamler; Craig Wedren
- Website: davidwain.com/madjb

The Middle Aged Dad Jam Band (sometimes also called MadJam or MADJB) is an American garage band led by members of the comedy troupe The State. Its principals include vocalist Ken Marino, drummer David Wain, guitarist Frank Barrera, bassist Sweet Teddy P, keyboardist Jon Spurney, trumpeter Jordan Katz, and Wain's son Henry on saxophone. Regulars in the band include former Shudder to Think guitarist Craig Wedren, director Kestrin Pantera on cello and vocals, and Wain's niece Allie Stamler on violin and vocals.

== History ==
The band started making music videos in David Wain's Los Feliz garage during the COVID-19 pandemic, covering classic songs like Bruce Springsteen's "Born to Run" and Billy Joel's "Scenes from an Italian Restaurant". About half the members had kids, but, per Wain, all gave off "dad vibes."

They are frequently joined by other members of The State, such as Joe Lo Truglio, Kevin Allison, Kerri Kenney-Silver, and Thomas Lennon, as well as guest stars like "Weird Al" Yankovic, Will Forte, Kristen Bell, Jess McKenna, and Kathryn Hahn. Their expanded roster has played shows and festivals around the United States.

As their YouTube videos became more popular, MADJB went on more high-profile tour shows, such as headlining Comic Relief and a star-studded benefit for the L.A. wildfire relief.
