= Joe Lo Truglio =

American actor and comedian (born 1970)

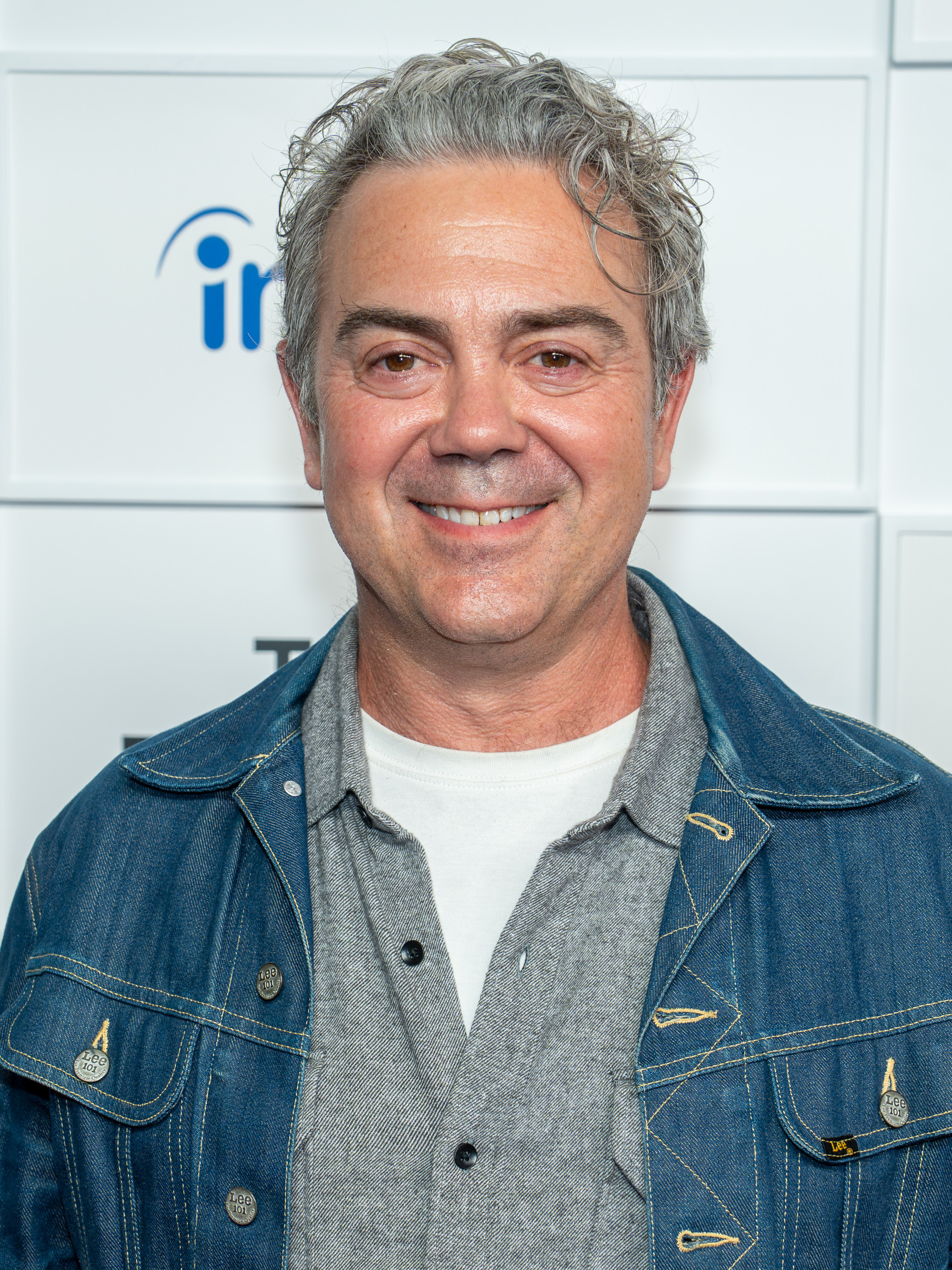
- Lo Truglio in 2025
- Born: December 2, 1970 (age 55); New York City, U.S.
- Education: New York University
- Occupations: Actor; comedian; writer
- Years active: 1991–present
- Spouse: Beth Dover (m. 2014)
- Children: 1
- Website: www.joelotruglio.com

Joe Lo Truglio (/loʊˈtruːljoʊ/ loh-TROO-lyoh; born December 2, 1970) is an American actor and comedian. Best known for his role as Charles Boyle on the Fox/NBC sitcom Brooklyn Nine-Nine, he also was a cast member on the television series The State and Reno 911!. His notable film roles include Wet Hot American Summer, I Love You, Man, Superbad, Paul, Role Models, and Wanderlust.

== Early life ==
Lo Truglio was born in the Ozone Park neighborhood of Queens, New York City, on December 2, 1970. He is of Italian and Irish descent. He grew up in Margate, Florida, and graduated from Coconut Creek High School. He met many of his future The State cast members at New York University, where he took part in the school's sketch comedy group.

== Career ==
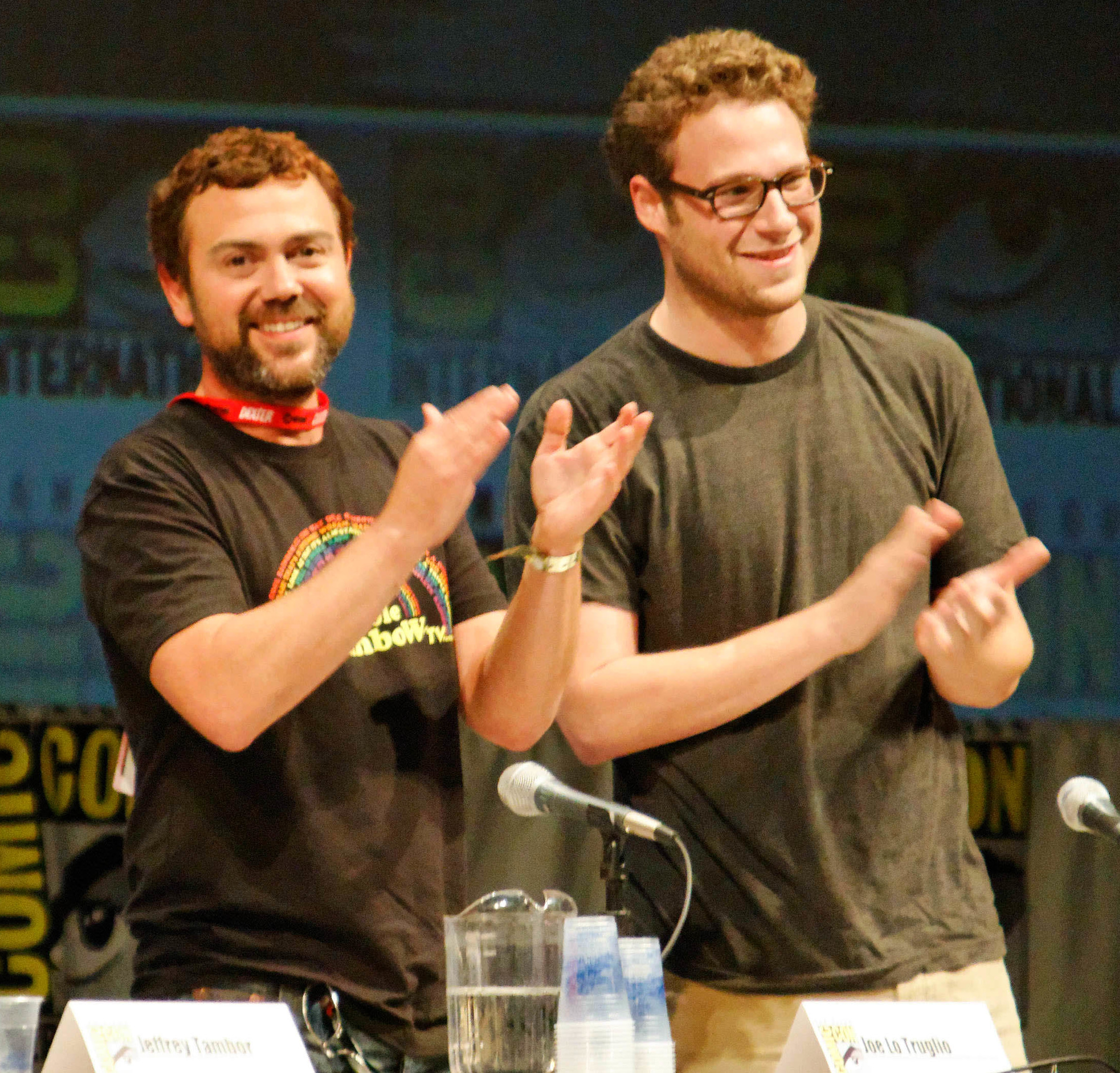
Lo Truglio with Seth Rogen (right) in 2010

Lo Truglio wrote and acted in various skits for The State, and animated segments for the show. After The State ended in 1995, he made a number of guest appearances throughout the late 1990s on shows such as Viva Variety, Upright Citizens Brigade, Law & Order and Third Watch.

In 2001, Lo Truglio appeared in fellow State alumnus David Wain's comedy film Wet Hot American Summer, where he played a camp counselor. He made cameo appearances on David Wain, Michael Showalter, and Michael Ian Black's online Stella shorts series.

He appeared in the 2005 Comedy Central show Stella and had a cameo in Showalter's film The Baxter. He made cameos on Reno 911!, as well as in the 2007 movie, Reno 911!: Miami. He has provided his voice for several video games including The Warriors. In 2005, he provided the voice of Vincenzo 'Lucky' Cilli in Grand Theft Auto: Liberty City Stories. In 2006 he had a supporting role in Artie Lange's Beer League.

Lo Truglio has appeared in several television commercials, including Gateway Computer and Jack Link's Beef Jerky.

He portrayed "Francis the Driver" in the Judd Apatow hit comedy Superbad and had supporting roles in films such as Pineapple Express, Paul, Role Models, Wanderlust, and I Love You, Man. In July 2008, Lo Truglio starred with Bill Hader and Jason Sudeikis in the web series The Line on Crackle. He has appeared on the comedy podcasts Comedy Bang! Bang!, Never Not Funny, and Superego.

Lo Truglio appeared on the Starz comedy Party Down and also had a recurring role on the short-lived 2010 Fox sitcom Sons of Tucson. In 2011, he co-starred in the short-lived NBC comedy series Free Agents starring Hank Azaria. Lo Truglio provided the voice of Freddy in the American Dad! episode "Stan's Best Friend." In 2013, Lo Truglio began co-starring opposite Andy Samberg and Andre Braugher on the Fox comedy series Brooklyn Nine-Nine.

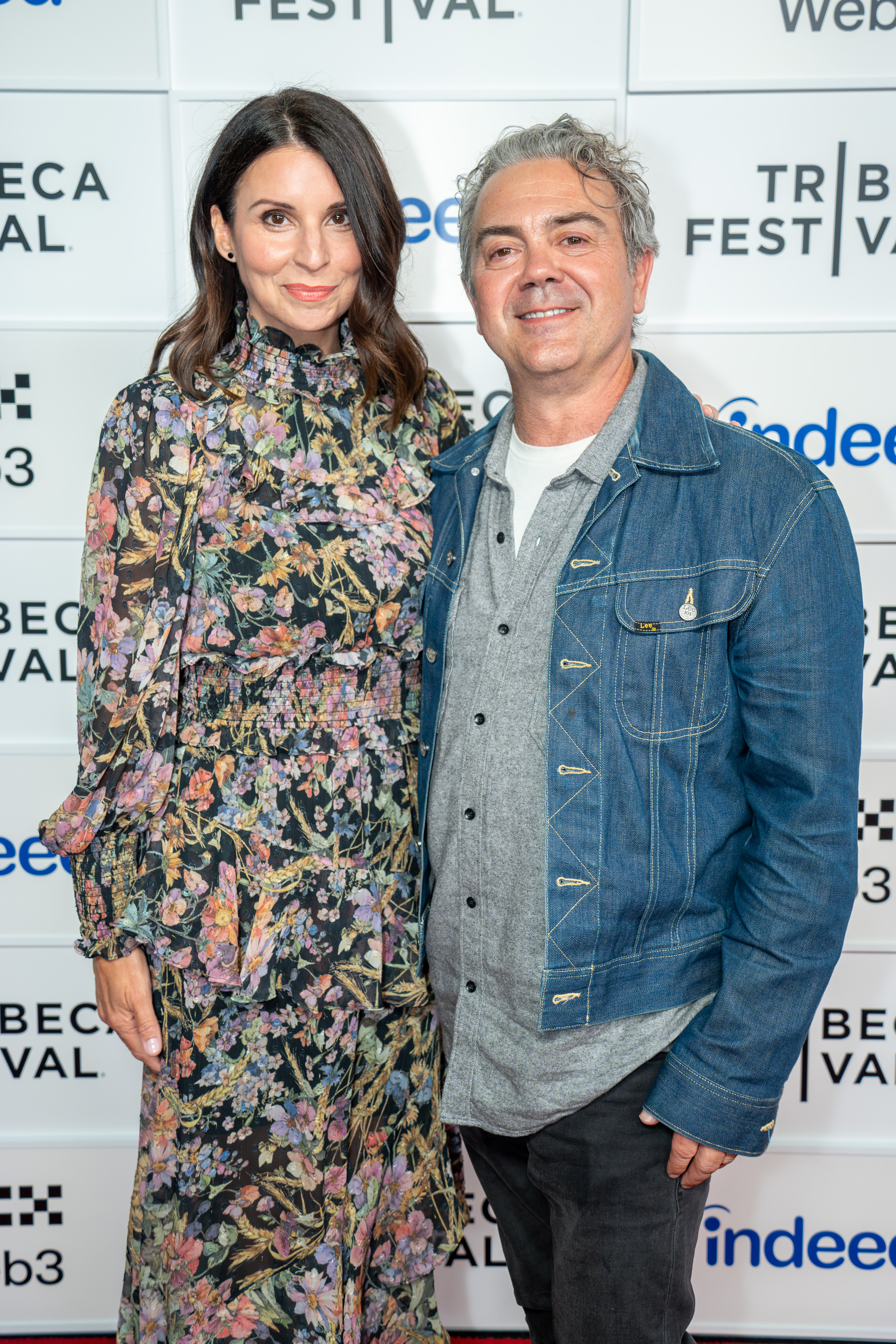
Beth Dover and Joe Lo Truglio at Long Live The State during the 2025 Tribeca Festival

Lo Truglio reprised his role as Neil in the eight-episode Netflix series Wet Hot American Summer: First Day of Camp, the prequel to the 2001 film Wet Hot American Summer. The series premiered on July 31, 2015.

In 2022, Joe Lo Truglio had his feature directorial debut with the horror film Outpost, in which his wife Beth Dover stars.

== Personal life ==
Lo Truglio married actress Beth Dover on April 19, 2014, following their engagement in 2013. They have co-starred in Brooklyn Nine-Nine episode "Fancy Brudgom" (2014), in the third season of Burning Love (2013), and in the TV series Wet Hot American Summer: First Day of Camp (2015) and Wet Hot American Summer: Ten Years Later (2017). They have a son, Eli, born in 2016.

== Filmography ==
=== Film ===
Year	Title	Role	Notes
1997	Naked in the Cold Sun		
2001	Wet Hot American Summer	Neil	
2002	Stella shorts	Various	
2003	The Station Agent	Danny	
2003	Last Man Running	Chooch	
2005	Hitch	Music Lover Guy	
2005	Stricken	Joe #1	Short
2005	The Baxter	Bar Baxter #1	
2005	The Pigs	Hal	
2006	Beer League	Dave	
2007	The Ten	Paul Mardino	
2007	Reno 911!: Miami	Tattoo Shop Owner #2	
2007	Puberty: The Movie	Herman Goldberg	
2007	Superbad	Francis the Driver	
2008	Pineapple Express	Mr. Edwards	
2008	Role Models	Kuzzik	
2009	Fanboys	Jail Guard	
2009	I Love You, Man	Lonnie	
2010	Gulliver's Travels	Butt-Crack Man	
2011	Paul	O'Reilly	
2011	High Road	Officer Fogerty	
2012	Wanderlust	Wayne Davidson	
2012	Queens of Country	Penny McEntire	
2012	My Uncle Rafael	Father Jim	
2012	Pitch Perfect	Clef #1	
2012	Wreck-It Ralph	Markowski (voice)	
2014	About Last Night	Ryan Keller	
2014	Someone Marry Barry	Sammy	
2015	Knight of Cups	Guest	
2015	Pitch Perfect 2	Member of Tone Hangers	
2015	The Breakup Girl	Steve	
2017	Win It All	Ron	
2018	A Futile and Stupid Gesture	Brad Zotti	
2019	Here Awhile	Gary	
2021	Mark, Mary & Some Other People	Chris	
2022	Outpost		Director
2024	Big City Greens the Movie: Spacecation	Big Tech Scientist (voice)	
2024	Hot Frosty	Deputy Sheriff Ed Schatz	
2026	Gail Daughtry and the Celebrity Sex Pass	Sergio	

=== Television ===
Year	Title	Role	Notes
1992–1993	You Wrote It, You Watch It	Various	Also writer
1993–1995	The State	Various	27 episodes; also creator and writer
1999	Upright Citizens Brigade	Airduct Friar	Episode: "Infested with Friars"
2000	Law & Order	Policeman #2	Episode: "Turnstile Justice"
2000	TV Funhouse	Bellboy	Episode: "Hawaiian Day"
2002	Third Watch	The Wrong Bernie	Episode: "Firestarter"
2005	Stella	Ansel	Episode: "Office Party"
2005	Cheap Seats	Terry Borkin	Episode: "Coney Island Hot Dog Eating Contest"
2005–2009, 2020–2022	Reno 911!	Shopkeeper / Deputy Frank Rizzo	36 episodes
2008	Wainy Days	Various	3 episodes; also writer
2008	The Sarah Silverman Program	Kenneth	Episode: "Patriot Tact"
2008–2011	Childrens Hospital	Dr. Antonio Zarala / Shane	2 episodes
2009	Cupid	Jimmy	Episode: "Pilot"
2009	Party Down	Donnie	Episode: "James Rolf High School Twentieth Reunion"
2010	Sons of Tucson	Glenn	5 episodes
2010–2011	Glenn Martin, DDS	Various voices	5 episodes
2010–2011	Backwash	Officer Bobby Bleeker	5 episodes
2011	Mad Love	Nick	Episode: "The Spy Who Loved Me"
2011–2012	Free Agents	Walter	8 episodes
2012	How I Met Your Mother	Mr. Honeywell	Episode: "The Stamp Tramp" and "Twelve Horny Women"
2012	Wedding Band	Bobby	Episode: "Time of My Life"
2012–2022	Robot Chicken	Ted Logan / Father / Beth's Husband / World War II Pilot (voice)	2 episodes
2012–2022	American Dad!	Various voices	11 episodes
2012–2022	Bob's Burgers	Various voices	8 episodes
2013	Burning Love	Alex	23 episodes
2013	Community	Mark	2 episodes
2013	Family Tree	Souvenir Vendor	Episode: "Indians"
2013	NTSF:SD:SUV::	Nate Mungus	Episode: "Comic Con-Air"
2013	Comedy Bang! Bang!	Stan Couples	Episode: "Sarah Silverman Wears a Black Dress with a White Collar"
2013–2016	Drunk History	Various	4 episodes
2013–2021	Brooklyn Nine-Nine	Charles Boyle	Main role; 152 episodes, directed the episode "The Bimbo" in season 6
2015	Scheer-RL	Mark Wahlberg	Episode: "Eminem and Mark Wahlberg"
2015	Wet Hot American Summer: First Day of Camp	Neil	5 episodes
2016	New Girl	Charles Boyle	Episode: "Homecoming"
2017	Animals.	Gigglepuss / Father Anthony (voice)	2 episodes
2017	Wet Hot American Summer: Ten Years Later	Neil	4 episodes
2017	Dice	Roger	Episode: "It's a Miserable Life"
2017	Easy	Mike	Episode: "Package Thief"
2017	Do You Want to See a Dead Body?	Himself	Episode: "A Body and a High School Reunion"
2020	The Comey Rule	Jeff Sessions	Miniseries
2022	StoryBots: Answer Time	Mr. Cow	Episode: "How Do Tornadoes Form?"
2023	History of the World, Part II	Bishop 1	Episode: "VIII"
2023	Digman!	Cale Caesar (voice)	Episode: "Et Tu"
2024	Monsters at Work	Jack (voice)	3 episodes
2024	After Midnight	Himself	Episode 65
2024	Night Court	Detective Kratz	Episode: "Feliz NaviDead"
2025	Ghosts	Ron	Episode: "The Bachelorette Party"
2026	Rick and Morty	Camp Shergale camper (voice)	Episode: "Salute Your Morts"
2026	Star Trek: Strange New Worlds	Commander Ajachi	Series 4 Episode 5: "Level-Five Transporter Accident"

=== Video games ===
Year	Title	Role
2004	Grand Theft Auto: San Andreas	Pedestrian
2005	The Warriors	Vermin / Birdie
2005	Grand Theft Auto: Liberty City Stories	Vincenzo Cilli
2019	Anthem	Neeson
