= A. D. Miles =

American actor, writer, and comedian (born 1971)

- Born: Anthony David Miles; November 8, 1971 (age 54); North Carolina, U.S.
- Occupations: Actor, comedian, writer
- Years active: 1999–present
- Spouse: Katie Miles
- Children: 2

Anthony David Miles (born November 8, 1971) is an American actor, writer and comedian. He was head writer for The Tonight Show Starring Jimmy Fallon from 2014 to 2017, which he helped to develop. As an actor, he is best known as step-dad Gary on the Fallon skit Ew! and as Marty Shonson on Comedy Central's Dog Bites Man. He has also appeared in multiple other Fallon sketches, such as a member of "the Ragtime Gals" barbershop quartet, and "Mr. Fletcher" the Camp Winnisaukee counselor in the sketches in which Fallon and Justin Timberlake sing songs at their childhood camp. He also appeared in recurring roles on both Law & Order: Criminal Intent and Tim and Eric Awesome Show, Great Job!

Miles' film work includes Bamboozled, The Believer, Wet Hot American Summer, Thirteen Conversations About One Thing, Uptown Girls, The Baxter, The Ten, Role Models, and Wedding Daze.

Miles is a regular on David Wain's internet series Wainy Days and the creator and star of Horrible People, a show on the website My Damn Channel. He served as the head writer on Late Night with Jimmy Fallon, and often appeared in the show's comedy sketches, before moving with Fallon to The Tonight Show. Miles is a frequent collaborator with comedian and director David Wain and the comedy trio Stella (of which Wain is a member), appearing in the Stella shorts and the 2005 Stella TV series, and acting in many of Wain's projects (Wet Hot American Summer, Wet Hot American Summer: First Day of Camp, The Ten, Role Models, Children's Hospital, Wainy Days, and in fellow Stella member Michael Showalter's The Baxter. As of season five, Miles is credited as a "consulting producer" on Arrested Development. In 2022, Miles became the announcer of the rebooted classic game show Password hosted by Keke Palmer for NBC.

Miles is married to artist and clothing designer Katie Miles. The couple have two daughters and live in Brooklyn, New York.
