= Trust Me, I'm a Game Show Host =

American game show

- Genre: Game show
- Created by: Mark Burnett; David Granger; Will Macdonald
- Directed by: Don Wiener
- Presented by: D. L. Hughley; Michael Ian Black
- Country of origin: United States
- Original language: English
- No. of seasons: 1
- No. of episodes: 10

Production
- Executive producers: Mark Burnett; Barry Poznick; David Granger; Will Macdonald
- Production companies: One Three Media; Monkey Kingdom; Barracuda Television Productions

Original release
- Network: TBS
- Release: October 22 – December 17, 2013

Trust Me, I'm a Game Show Host is an American game show that premiered on October 22, 2013, and aired on TBS. It is hosted by comedians D. L. Hughley and Michael Ian Black.

== Premise ==
Two comedic hosts try to deceive contestants with odd or implausible statements; one is telling the truth and another is lying. The contestant must decide which fact presented by the hosts is the truth in order to win money. After a few chances of guessing which host they trust is telling the truth, the contestant gets an opportunity to choose a true fact from a range of statements to add an additional $20,000 to their winnings.

== Episodes ==
No.	Title	Original release date	Prod. code	U.S. viewers (millions)
1	"Ambree Klemm"	October 22, 2013	101	1.17
2	"Todd Jones"	October 29, 2013	102	1.24
3	"Jamal Quezaire"	November 5, 2013	103	1.28
4	"Brian Yarbrough"	November 12, 2013	104	1.04
5	"Patricia Canale"	November 19, 2013	105	1.14
6	"Thomas Riker"	November 26, 2013	106	1.22
7	"Jason Adler"	December 3, 2013	107	1.15
8	"Natalie Hall"	December 10, 2013	108	1.17
9	"Nikki Kirkland"	December 17, 2013	109	1.07
10	"Frank Rice"	December 17, 2013	110	0.56

== Reception ==
Melissa Camacho of Common Sense Media gave the show 3 out of 5 stars.
