= The Michael Showalter Showalter =

- Created by: Michael Showalter
- Starring: Michael Showalter
- Country of origin: United States
- Original language: English
- No. of seasons: 1
- No. of episodes: 10

Production
- Producers: Jordan Hall, Sam Reich
- Camera setup: Single camera
- Running time: 4-5 minutes (approx.)

Original release
- Network: CollegeHumor
- Release: January 1 – March 30, 2008

The Michael Showalter Showalter was an internet video series starring and created by Michael Showalter that was hosted on the website, CollegeHumor.

The show lasted for one season of ten episodes that all aired from 2007 to 2008. The series was a chat show hosted by Showalter. Each episode features a guest, usually a comedian or an actor. Showalter typically gives intentionally awkward and humorous interviews, in which he is occasionally seen asking to borrow money from his interviewee.

== Episodes ==
#	Title	Original airdate
1	"Zach Galifianakis"	January 1, 2008
2	"Michael Ian Black"	January 8, 2008
3	"David Cross"	January 15, 2008
4	"Paul Rudd"	January 22, 2008
5	"David Wain"	February 12, 2008
6	"Andy Samberg"	February 26, 2008
7	"Jack McBrayer"	March 9, 2008
8	"Michael Cera"	March 16, 2008
9	"Mike Birbiglia"	March 23, 2008
10	"Michael Ian Black"	March 30, 2008
