= Andrea Rosen =

American actress (born 1974)

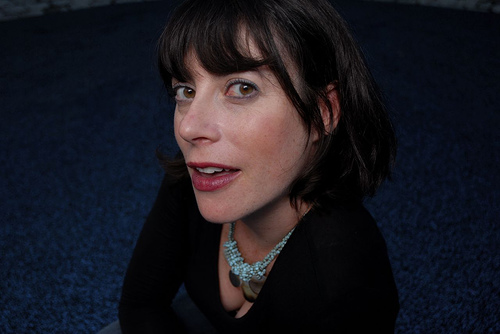
- Born: September 29, 1974 (age 52); New York City, U.S.
- Occupations: Comedian, actress
- Years active: 2003–present
- Spouse: John Gemberling (m. 2012)
- Children: 2

Andrea Rosen (born September 29, 1974) is an American comedian and actress most notable for her work with comedy troupes Stella and Variety Shac, and for her appearances in numerous television commercials. She is the creator of Take Me to Your Mother, a documentary-style comedy on the Nick Jr. Channel/NickMom cable network.

== Life and career ==
Rosen shared an apartment for five years with Stella member Michael Showalter.

A regular on the Brooklyn comedy circuit, Ms. Rosen has written and performed two one-woman shows, Fast and Loose and Room for Rent.

Rosen was discovered in December 2000, when Terry's Chocolate named her "America's Whackiest Amateur Comedian".

Rosen co-wrote and performed It's a Detective Agency and Everyone's English, a play at the NYC Fringe Festival. In late 2007, Rosen revealed that Variety Shac was working on a television pilot for the Adult Swim cable network.

From 2013 to 2014, Rosen starred on the comedy show, Take Me to Your Mother on NickMom.

== Personal life ==
She married actor/comedian John Gemberling in 2012 and they have two sons.

== Films ==
- The Rainponch (2019)
- The Ten (2007)
- The Baxter (2005) (uncredited)

== TV shows ==
- Upload (2020–2025)
- Take Me to Your Mother (2013–2014)
- Episodes (2014)
- Michael and Michael Have Issues (2009)
- Flight of the Conchords (2009)
- Whitest Kids U'Know (2007)
- VH1's 40 Most Softsational Soft-Rock Songs (2007)
- VH1: All Access (2006–present)
- Rescue Me (2006)
- Denis Leary's Merry F %$in' Christmas (2005)
- Stella (2005)
- VH1's ...ever! franchise (2004–2005)
- The Wrong Coast (2004)
- Shaman King (2003)

== Commercials ==
Rosen has appeared in over 50 television commercials, with her most notable campaigns being Staples, Inc. (2006), Yoplait (2007), and New York Lottery (2008).

== Live performances ==
Rosen performs monthly at Upright Citizens Brigade Theater with her group Variety Shac. She has also made the following solo performances:

- "Fast and Loose"
- "Room for Rent"
- "It's a Detective Agency and Everyone's English" (co-writer/producer)
- Invite Them Up (stand-up performer)
- Pie-Hole Comedy Show (regular host, 2000— )
