= Ken Marino =

American actor (born 1968)

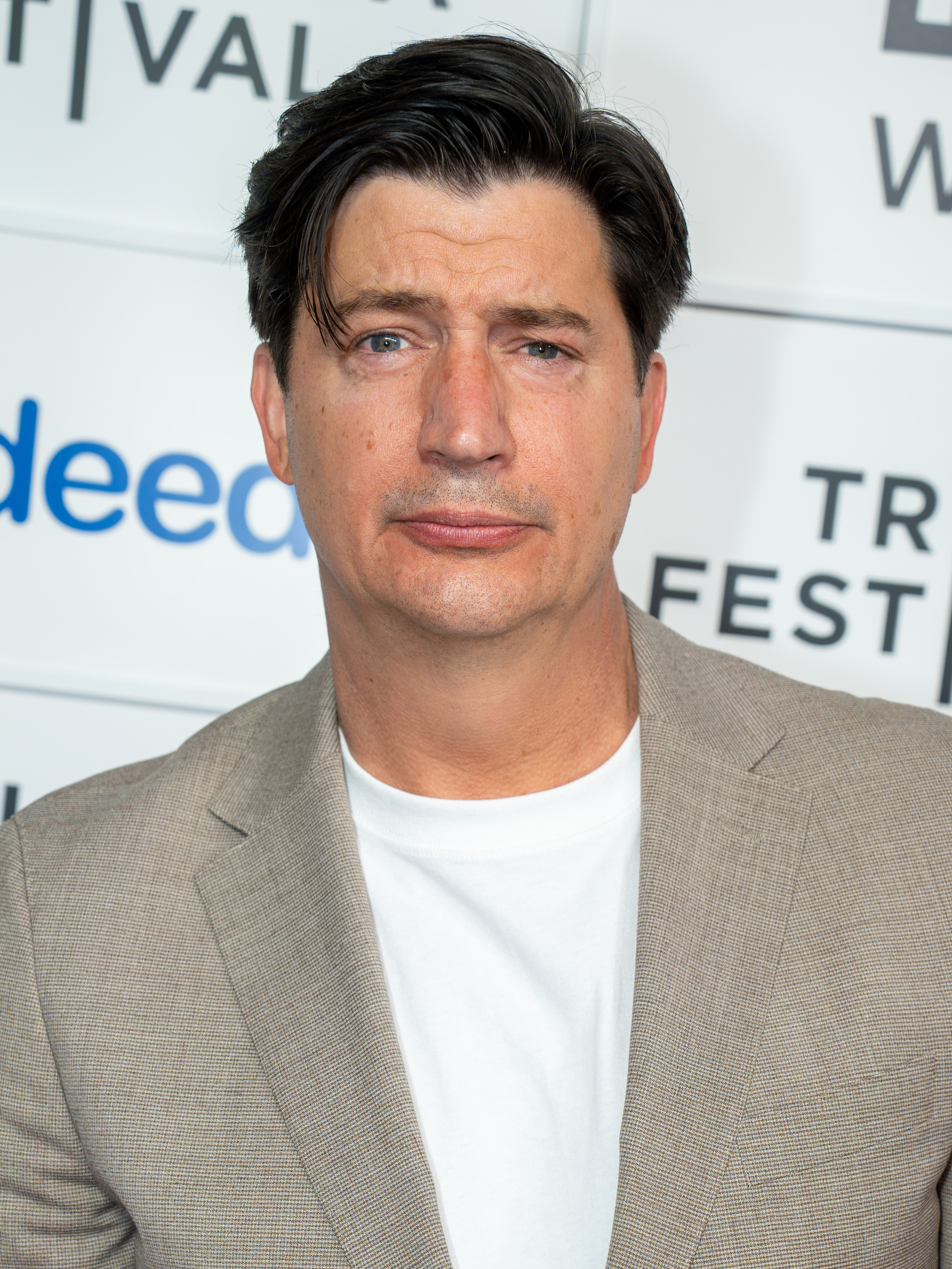
- Marino in 2025
- Born: Kenneth Joseph Marino; December 19, 1968 (age 57); Long Island, New York, U.S.
- Education: New York University
- Occupations: Actor; comedian; director; singer; writer
- Years active: 1992–present
- Spouse: Erica Oyama (m. 2005)
- Children: 2

Kenneth Joseph Marino (born December 19, 1968) is an American actor, comedian, director, screenwriter, and singer. He was a cast member on MTV's The State and has starred in shows such as Party Down, Marry Me, Burning Love, and Childrens Hospital. He played the Lehman brothers on the Showtime series Black Monday. He stars as Victor in the cult-classic comedy film Wet Hot American Summer and its spin-offs. He is the lead singer of the garage band the Middle Aged Dad Jam Band.

== Early life ==
Marino was born on Long Island, New York, to an Italian-American family. He attended West Islip High School in West Islip, New York. He then studied at the Lee Strasberg Institute and Tisch School of the Arts at New York University in New York City.

On Marino's first day at NYU, he met David Wain and Craig Wedren and quickly befriended both of them; Marino was popular in part because he had milk crates full of bottles of alcoholic beverages (which he had stolen the previous summer at a job at a yacht club), and he carried the crates around with him when he visited people's dorm rooms. The next year, Wain and Marino were among the co-founders of a comedy troupe called The New Group, which eventually was renamed to The State.

== Career ==
After college, Marino continued working and performing with The State. From 1992 to 1993, Marino and several other members of The State appeared on the MTV sketch comedy series You Wrote It, You Watch It, hosted by Jon Stewart; later in 1993, the entire troupe gained their own sketch comedy series on MTV, The State. The series ran until 1995. In 1997, Marino co-starred with Rob Schneider in the second season of Men Behaving Badly. He starred in the short lived series First Years in 2001, and had a recurring role as Prof. Wilder on the TV series Dawson's Creek (2001–2002) . He made multiple appearances on Charmed and Rock Me Baby, and appeared in four seasons of Veronica Mars as private detective Vinnie Van Lowe. He was cast to star in a remake of the TV series The Courtship of Eddie's Father, but the pilot was not picked up. Instead, he was cast in the Starz original series Party Down. He played a gay demon on the TV series Reaper, Dr. Glenn Richie in the satirical television series Childrens Hospital and Captain 'CJ' Stentley on the show Brooklyn Nine-Nine.

Marino also made guest appearances in Will & Grace (in the season 3 episode, "Three's a Crowd, Six Is a Freakshow"), Angel (season 1), Reno 911! (Season 1, Episode 2 and Season 3, Episode 3), Stella (season 1), Grey's Anatomy (season 2), Monk (in season 3's "Mr. Monk Takes His Medicine"), Private Practice (season 3), and Happy Endings (season 2, episode 10, "The Shrink, the Dare, Her Date and Her Brother").

Marino starred in 2004's Love for Rent. He can also be seen in a non-speaking role as the music producer/board operator in the pre-ride film that accompanies Rock 'n' Roller Coaster at Disney's Hollywood Studios. He had a cameo in the end of The Baxter. He also starred in the Hallmark Channel movie Falling in Love with the Girl Next Door in 2006. In 2009, he had a cameo in an episode of Californication.

Marino wrote the screenplay for Diggers (2006), a coming-of-age film set in mid-1970s Long Island. Along with fellow The State member David Wain, he wrote and produced the films The Ten (2007), Role Models (2008) and Wanderlust (2012), all directed by Wain; Marino also had small acting roles in all three films. He played Todd, the strip club manager, alongside Jennifer Aniston in the 2013 film We're The Millers. He also appeared in Wain's 2001 film Wet Hot American Summer.

Ken Marino performing with Middle Aged Dad Jam Band in 2025

He appears as Guy Young, a sports television host, in season 4 of HBO's Eastbound & Down.

Marino starred as Mark Orlando in the Yahoo! web series Burning Love, a spoof of the TV series The Bachelor and The Bachelorette. The series was created by his wife Erica Oyama, while Marino also directed all three seasons. Afterward, Marino starred opposite Casey Wilson on the NBC sitcom Marry Me, which ran for one season from 2014 to 2015.

In 2016, he starred in the second season of Marvel's series Agent Carter as mobster Joseph Manfredi.

Marino has also directed several episodes of the sitcoms The Goldbergs, Super Fun Night, Childrens Hospital, and Trophy Wife.

In 2017, Marino starred as Mr. Johnson in the Netflix comedy-horror film The Babysitter. He reprised his role in the sequel The Babysitter: Killer Queen.

From 2019 to 2023, Marino starred as music manager Streeter in the HBO comedy series The Other Two.

Since the COVID-19 pandemic, Marino has been the lead vocalist for the Middle Aged Dad Jam Band, alongside founder and fellow State alum David Wain.

Beginning Fall 2026, Marino will be making his stage debut as Ernest Menville in the national tour of Death Becomes Her.

== Personal life ==
Marino is married to screenwriter Erica Oyama. They have two children.

== Filmography ==
=== Film ===
Year	Title	Role	Notes
1993	Hocus Pocus (1993 film)	Guest at Allison's Halloween Party	Uncredited
1997	Gattaca	Sequencing Technician	
1999	Love Happens	Mike Parker	
1999	Carlo's Wake	Antonio Torello	
2000	101 Ways (The Things a Girl Will Do to Keep Her Volvo)	Officer Russotelli	
2001	Wet Hot American Summer	Victor Pulak	
2001	Tortilla Soup	Jeff	
2001	Joe Somebody	Rick Raglow	
2005	The Baxter	Jack Mechanic	
2005	Hoodwinked!	Raccoon Jerry (voice)	
2005	Love for Rent	Dr. Neil Gardner	
2006	Duncan Removed	Ben	Short film
2006	Diggers	Lozo	Also producer and writer
2007	The Ten	Dr. Glenn Richie	Also producer and writer
2007	Reno 911!: Miami	Deaf Tattoo Artist	
2008	Role Models	Jim Stansel	Also writer
2009	The Antagonist	Party Host	Short film
2010	Jeffie Was Here	Roger	
2012	Wanderlust	Rick Gergenblatt	Also producer and writer
2012	Struck by Lightning	Dr. Wealer	
2012	For a Good Time, Call...	Harold	
2013	In a World...	Gustav Warner	
2013	Bad Milo!	Duncan	
2013	We're the Millers	Todd	
2014	They Came Together	Tommy	
2014	Veronica Mars	Vinnie Van Lowe	
2015	Goosebumps	Coach Carr	
2016	Masterminds	Doug	
2016	The Late Bloomer	Dr. Hanson	
2017	How to Be a Latin Lover		Director
2017	The Babysitter	Mr. Johnson	
2018	Dog Days	Carven Wagi	Also director
2020	The Main Event	Frankie Albano	
2020	The Sleepover	Ron Finch	
2020	The Babysitter: Killer Queen	Mr. Johnson	
2022	Susie Searches	Edgar Cabot	
2023	Candy Cane Lane	Bruce	
2025	For Worse	Rick	
2026	Gail Daughtry and the Celebrity Sex Pass	Vincent	Also producer and writer

=== Television ===
Year	Title	Role	Notes
1992	You Wrote It, You Watch It	Various	Series regular (also writer)
1993–1995	The State	Various	Series regular; 27 episodes (also co-creator & writer)
1996	Boston Common	Bob Cabot	Episode: "Gobble, Gobble, Aggch!" (2x09)
1996	The Single Guy	Big Tipper	Episode: "The Deepest Cut"
1997	Spin City	Dan	Episode: "Bye Bye Love" (1x13)
1997	Men Behaving Badly	Steve Cochrane	Series regular (season 2); 12 episodes
1998	Hercules	Tipis (voice)	Episode: "Hercules and the Argonauts"
1998	Holding the Baby	Mike	Episode: "Viva Las Gordy"
1998	Conrad Bloom	Ben	Episode: "The Ultimatum"
1999	The Practice	Kevin Michaels	Episode: "End Games" (3x16)
1999	Nash Bridges	Todd West	Episode: "Truth & Consequences"
2000	Angel	Wilson Christopher	Episode: "Expecting" (1x12)
2000	Veronica's Closet	Wayne	Episode: "Veronica Sets Josh Up" (3x18)
2000	Will & Grace	Mark	Episode: "Three's a Crowd, Six Is a Freak Show" (3x10)
2001	First Years	Miles Lawton	Series regular; 9 episodes (6 unaired)
2001–2002	Dawson's Creek	Professor David Wilder	Recurring guest star (season 5); 10 episodes
2002	Leap of Faith	Andy	6 episodes
2002	Haunted	Bob Pratt	Episode: "Fidelity"
2002	Do Over	Reuben	Episode: "The Anniversary"
2002	Charmed	Miles	Recurring guest star (season 5); 2 episodes
2003	Las Vegas	Anton McCarren	Episode: "Jokers and Fools"
2003–2004	Rock Me Baby	Kelly	3 episodes
2003–2022	Reno 911!	Various	5 episodes
2004	What I Like About You	Dr. Brad Turner	Recurring guest star (season 2); 3 episodes
2004	Monk	Lester Highsmith	Episode: "Mr. Monk Takes His Medicine"
2004	NYPD Blue	Det. Gerard Donnelly	Episode: "The 3-H Club"
2005	Inconceivable	Peter	Episode: "Sex, Lies and Sonograms"
2005	Stella	Mr. Fabrizio	Episode: "Paper Route" (1x05)
2005–2007, 2019	Veronica Mars	Vinnie Van Lowe	Recurring; 13 episodes
2006	Falling in Love with the Girl Next Door	Mark Lucas	TV movie
2006	Grey's Anatomy	Brad Ackles	Episode: "17 Seconds" (2x25)
2007	The Sarah Silverman Program	Patient #1	Episode: "Joan of Arf"
2008	CSI: Miami	Alan Farris	Episode: "You May Now Kill the Bride"
2008–2009	Reaper	Tony	Series regular; 9 episodes
2008–2016	Childrens Hospital	Dr. Glenn Richie/Just Falcon/Ron Donald/Glenn	Series regular; 69 episodes (also writer)
2009	United States of Tara	Mike Connor	Episode: "Possibility"
2009	Greek	Camp Leader	Episode: "Take Me Home, Cyprus Rhodes"
2009	In the Motherhood	Shep	3 episodes
2009	Private Practice	Mr. Larson	Episode: "The Way We Were" (3x02)
2009	Californication	Professor David Wilder	Episode: "So Here's the Thing..." (3x07)
2009–2010, 2023	Party Down	Ronald Wayne "Ron" Donald	Series regular; 26 episodes (also director)
2011–2013	Whitney	Brian	2 episodes
2012	Happy Endings	Richard "Rick" Rickman	Episode: "The Shrink, The Dare, Her Date and Her Brother" (2x10)
2012	The Exes	Brad	Episode: "The Ex Always Rings Twice" (1x10)
2012	Key and Peele	Dreadlocked Guy	Episode: "Flash Mob"
2012	The League	Donny 'The Seed' Sedowsky	Episode: "The Tailgate" (4x06)
2013	Toy Story of Terror!	Pocketeer (voice)	TV short
2013	Eastbound & Down	Guy Young	Recurring (season 4); 8 episodes
2013–2019	Drunk History	Various	4 episodes
2013–2015	Axe Cop	Flute Cop/Fife Cop (voice)	Series regular; 16 episodes
2014	Trophy Wife	Coach Dawson	Episode: "There's No Guy in Team" (1x20) (also director)
2014	Bad Teacher	Mike	Episode: "Daddy Issues" (1x02)
2014	Uncle Grandpa	Christopher Columbus (voice)	Episode: "1992 Called" (1x27)
2014	Play It Again, Dick	Himself	Recurring; 3 episodes
2014–2015	Marry Me	Jake Schuffman	Series regular; 18 episodes
2015	Togetherness	Craig Weets	Episode: "Family Day" (1x01)
2015	Golan the Insatiable	Keith Knudsen Sr. (voice)	Recurring role; 2 episodes
2015	Wet Hot American Summer: First Day of Camp	Victor Pulak	Main cast; 5 episodes
2015	Maron	Himself	Episode: "Spiral"
2015	Comedy Bang! Bang!	Himself	Episode: "Ken Marino Wears a Slim Gray Suit and Salmon Tie" (4x27)
2015–2017	Life in Pieces	Will	Episodes: "Babe Secret Phone Germs" (1x05) and "#TBT: Y2K Sophia Honeymoon Critter" (2x09)
2015–2019	Fresh Off the Boat	Gus	6 episodes
2016	Wander Over Yonder	Phil (voice)	Episode: "The Family Reunion/The Rival"
2016	Agent Carter	Joseph Manfredi	5 episodes
2016	Vinyl	Jackie Jervis	3 episodes
2016	House of Lies	Mark Fielder	Episodes: "Creative Destruction Phenomenon" (5x01) and "Game Theory"" (5x02)
2016	Family Guy	Dallas Portland (voice)	Episode: "The New Adventures of Old Tom" (14x18)
2016, 2019	Brooklyn Nine-Nine	Captain Jason 'C.J.' Stentley	Recurring role; 5 episodes
2016–2019	iZombie	Brandt Stone	3 episodes
2016–2022	Bob's Burgers	Agent Flanley/Jack Conway (voice)/ Spencer Blankenship	4 episodes
2017	Speechless	Ethan	Episode: "V-a-l-Valentine's D-a-Day" (1x14)
2017	Wet Hot American Summer: Ten Years Later	Victor Pulak	7 episodes
2018	Disjointed	Angelo DeStevens	3 episodes
2018	Ghosted	Daniel Jennifer	Episode: "The Article"
2018	I Love You, America with Sarah Silverman	John McConnell	Episode: "Ai-jen Poo"
2019	Ryan Hansen Solves Crimes on Television	Himself	Episode: "The Office Party"
2019	Historical Roasts	Mark Antony	Episode: "Cleopatra"
2019	American Dad!	Stu / Professor (voice)	2 episodes
2019	Daybreak	Stephen Hoyles	Episode: "MMMMMMM-HMMMMMM"
2019–2021	Black Monday	Larry/Lenny Lehmann	Recurring; 16 episodes
2019–2023	The Other Two	Streeter Peters	Main role
2020	Medical Police	Glenn Richie	3 episodes
2020	Close Enough	Dave (voice)	Episode: "Quilty Pleasures/The Perfect House"
2020–2025	Solar Opposites	Kevin / various (voice)	16 episodes
2021–2023	The Great North	Poppa Paul / Reggie (voice)	5 episodes
2022	Big City Greens	Dirk (voice)	Episode: "No Service/Takened"
2022	Central Park	Nathan Turrent (voice)	Episode: "A Star Is Owen"
2022–2024	Monster High	Dracula (voice)	6 episodes
2023	History of the World, Part II	Archbishop	Episode: "VIII"
2023	Never Have I Ever	Stoo	Episode "... gone to prom"
2023	HouseBroken	Clark / Parkour Squirrel (voice)	2 episodes
2023	The Simpsons	Dean Belichick (voice)	Episode: "Do the Wrong Thing"
2024	Dinner Time Live with David Chang	Himself	Episode: "United Plates of America"
2024	Royal Crackers	Keith (voice)	Episode: "Mycycle"
2025	High Potential	Charles Lavoie	Episode: "Chutes and Murders"
2025	The Residence	Harry Hollinger	8 episodes
2026	Running Point	Al Fleischman	Season 2
2026	Rick and Morty	Mauldin/Zarz (voice)	Episode: "Salute Your Mortys"

=== Other projects ===
Year	Project	Role	Notes
1999	Rock 'n' Roller Coaster Starring Aerosmith	Aerosmith's music producer	Pre-show video; Disney theme park attraction
2007–2012	Wainy Days	Director, writer, actor	Web series
2012	Krogzilla	Regurgitor/Delivery Guy	Web series
2012–2013	Burning Love	Mark Orlando	Web series; 29 episodes (also director and executive producer)
2024–present	Middle Aged Dad Jam Band	Vocalist	Web Series - YouTube
2026	High on Life 2	Travis	Video game
2026	Rock 'n' Roller Coaster Starring The Muppets	G-Force Records Music Producer, "Outstanding Lifetime Achievement" Award	Pre-show video; Disney theme park attraction
2026	Death Becomes Her (musical)	Ernest Menville	2026 North American Tour
