= Role Models =

- Theatrical release poster
- Directed by: David Wain
- Screenplay by: David Wain; Paul Rudd; Ken Marino; Timothy Dowling
- Story by: Timothy Dowling; William Blake Herron
- Produced by: Luke Greenfield; Mary Parent; Scott Stuber
- Starring: Seann William Scott; Paul Rudd; Christopher Mintz-Plasse; Jane Lynch; Elizabeth Banks
- Cinematography: Russ T. Alsobrook
- Edited by: Eric Kissack
- Music by: Craig Wedren
- Production companies: Relativity Media; Stuber/Parent Productions
- Distributed by: Universal Pictures
- Release dates: October 19, 2008 (AFF); November 7, 2008 (United States)
- Running time: 99 minutes
- Country: United States
- Language: English
- Budget: $28 million
- Box office: $92.4 million

Role Models is a 2008 American comedy film directed by David Wain, who co-wrote it with Timothy Dowling, Paul Rudd and Ken Marino. The film stars Rudd, Seann William Scott, Christopher Mintz-Plasse, Bobb'e J. Thompson, Jane Lynch, and Elizabeth Banks.

The film follows two energy drink salesmen, Danny (Rudd) and Wheeler (Scott), who are ordered to perform 150 hours of community service as punishment for various offenses. For their service, the two men work at a program designed to pair children with adult role models.

Premiering on October 19, 2008, at the Austin Film Festival, Role Models was released theatrically by Universal Pictures in the United States on November 7. The film received generally positive reviews from critics and was a box office success, grossing $92.4 million worldwide against a $28 million budget. It was nominated for a Critics' Choice Movie Award for Best Comedy.

== Plot ==
Danny and Wheeler are salesmen who have been promoting the energy drink "Minotaur" for the last decade, supposedly to keep kids off drugs. Wheeler loves the job, while Danny considers it pointless and dead-end, making him depressed and jaded. Danny's attitude causes his relationship with Beth to collapse, who breaks up with him after his impulsive proposal.

After a botched presentation at a high school, Danny and Wheeler's Minotaur truck is towed from the no-parking zone. Danny tries to free the truck, crashing into a statue after almost hitting a security guard. They are arrested and charged. Lawyer Beth makes a deal with the judge: they must do 150 hours of community service over the next 30 days, in lieu of 30 days in jail.

Their service is with Sturdy Wings, a big brother-big sister program led by Gayle Sweeny, a recovering addict. Wheeler is given Ronnie Shields, a vulgar, precocious young boy who has driven away all the other "Bigs" he has been paired with. Danny is assigned Augie Farks, a shy teen obsessed with a medieval LARPG called "LAIRE" (Live Action Interactive Role-playing Explorers).

Danny does not find common ground with Augie, while Ronnie dislikes Wheeler. Danny considers giving up and choosing jail, but Wheeler talks him out of it for fear of possibly getting raped there.

Gradually bonding with their "littles"; Ronnie and Wheeler talk about having been abandoned by their fathers, while Danny learns about Augie's medieval fantasy realm. Ronnie hears about Wheeler's favorite band, Kiss, and discovers that Wheeler shares his obsession with breasts, which Wheeler teaches him to control. Danny and Augie bond discovering they are both involved in the Sturdy Wings program against their will. Danny joins Augie's LAIRE and tries to get back with Beth, who insists that they remain separated.

Danny and Wheeler's good luck is short-lived. When Augie sneaks up on the King of LAIRE, Argotron, the King lies and tells everyone he killed Augie. Defending Augie, Danny confronts and shoves the King, getting them banned from LAIRE permanently. Later at dinner, Danny chides Augie's mother and her boyfriend for their ridicule towards Augie's interests. As they kick Danny out of the house, he retorts, "I'd be psyched if he was my kid."

Meanwhile, Wheeler takes Ronnie to a party, but leaves him unsupervised, resulting in Ronnie walking home alone. When both kids' parents ask Sturdy Wings for new mentors, Gayle expels Danny and Wheeler from the program, resulting in both men facing a jail sentence. Although Beth agrees to defend Danny and Wheeler in court, she warns them that they will most likely be sent to jail.

Wheeler gets permission from Karen to hang out with Ronnie once he gets out of jail, and Ronnie forgives him. Danny convinces King Argotron to allow him and Augie to fight in the battle royale. However, the King secretly warns the other members of Augie's LAIRE "country" of Xanthia that allowing Augie to fight with them will lead to severe retribution in the game. They call Augie to tell him he is a liability and kicked out of the group.

Danny and Augie form a new LAIRE country by asking Wheeler and Ronnie to join them. They arrive with Wheeler's Kiss costumes and a Kiss-themed Minotaur truck, naming their country "Kiss-My-Anthia". Augie finally defeats the king, but Sarah, a hidden player who goes by Esplen in LAIRE, attacks and defeats Augie; crowned the new queen, she chooses Augie as her king-consort. Augie's parents start showing him more support.

Impressed that Wheeler and Danny put the children's needs before their own, Gayle smooths over their legal troubles with the judge. Danny serenades Beth with a rendition of the Kiss song "Beth" and they reconcile.

== Cast ==
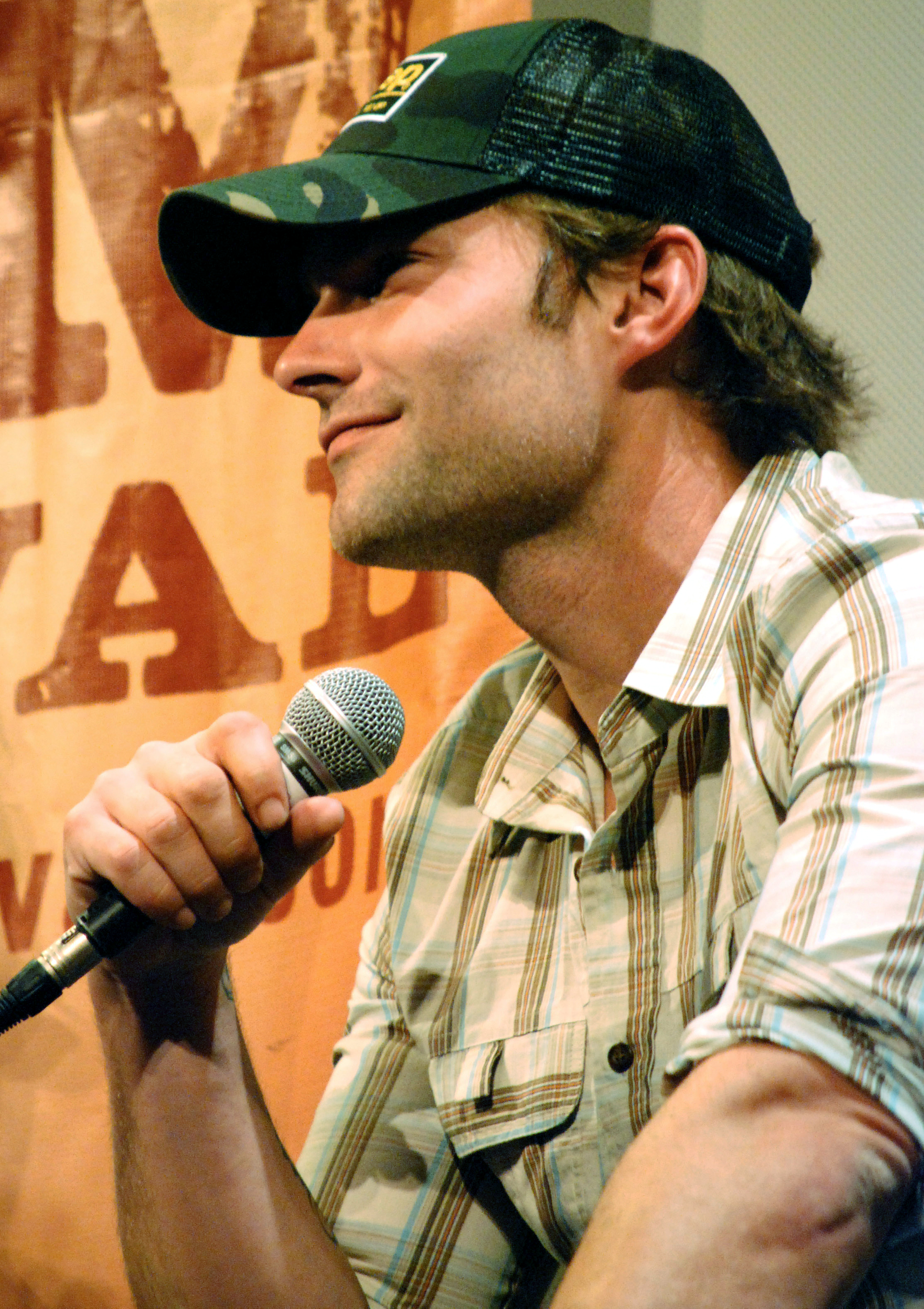
Seann William Scott at the Austin Film Festival promoting the film, October 2008

- Paul Rudd as Danny
- Seann William Scott as Anson Wheeler
- Christopher Mintz-Plasse as Augie Farks
- Bobb'e J. Thompson as Ronnie Shields
- Elizabeth Banks as Beth
- Jane Lynch as Gayle Sweeney
- Ken Jeong as King Argotron
- Kerri Kenney-Silver as Lynette Farks
- Ken Marino as Jim Stansel
- Nicole Randall Johnson as Karen Shields
- A.D. Miles as Martin Gary
- Joe Lo Truglio as Kuzzik
- Vincent Martella as Artonius
- Matt Walsh as Davith of Glencracken
- Allie Stamler as Sarah/Queen Esplen
- Jessica Morris as Linda the Teacher
- Carly Craig as Connie
- Keegan-Michael Key as Duane
- Amanda Righetti as Isabel
- Jorma Taccone as Mitch from Graphics
- Armen Weitzman as Party Dude
- Elijah Polanco as Ronnie's Friend
- Nate Hartley as Rule Master
- Louis C.K. as School Liaison

== Production ==
The film was originally announced in December 2006 under the title Big Brothers, with Luke Greenfield directing and Timothy Dowling writing the script. On January 22, 2007, a draft of the script credits Moses Port and David Guarascio as writers, with no listing of Dowling. During promotion for the film Knocked Up, Paul Rudd revealed that shooting on Big Brothers was on hiatus while the script was being retooled. News was later revealed that Rudd was commissioned to write a new draft of the script and David Wain had signed on to direct. Wain later revealed the film was now titled Little Big Men. Universal Pictures listed the film under the final title Role Models, which made its release on November 7, 2008. It was pre-screened at the University of Maryland's Hoff Theater on October 30, 2008, to positive accord.

A running gag in the film is a song entitled "Love Take Me Down (to the Streets)", which is claimed by Martin to be by the band Wings. In the initial scene at the Sturdy Wings building, Martin begins singing the song, which he claims is "one of their hits from the '70s", a fact which Danny denies. During the credits, the song plays and is listed on the film soundtrack as being performed by "Not Wings". The song was written by Charles Gansa, the film's composer known for his work in the band Guv'ner, and A. D. Miles, who plays Martin in the film. It was written to imitate the style of the music of Wings and performed by Joey Curatolo, a Paul McCartney soundalike who performs in the Beatles tribute band Rain.

== Release ==
=== Box office ===
Role Models opened #2 at the box office behind Madagascar: Escape 2 Africa with $19.2 million. The film made a total of $67,300,955 domestically and $25,201,210 in foreign countries, for a total of $92,502,165 worldwide.

=== Critical response ===
Role Models was met with generally positive reviews. On Rotten Tomatoes, the film has a rating of 77%, based on 162 reviews. The site's consensus reads, "Role Models is a frequently crude, always funny comedy with the cast providing solid work throughout." On Metacritic, the film holds a rating of 61 out of 100, based on 33 critics, indicating "generally positive reviews".

In their year end review, IGN awarded Role Models with "Best Comedy Film of 2008". Eye Weekly selected Role Models as one of the best films of 2008.

=== Home media ===
The DVD was released on March 10, 2009, selling 1,028,207 during its first week generating $17,469,237 in revenue. As of August 10, 2011 the DVD sold 2,555,713 copies and brought in over $40 million in revenue.

== Accolades ==
Year	Award	Category	Nominated work	Result
2008	St. Louis Film Critics Association Awards	Best Comedy	Role Models	Nominated
2009	Critics' Choice Movie Awards	Best Comedy	Role Models	Nominated
2009	Teen Choice Awards	Choice Movie – Bromantic Comedy	Role Models	Nominated
2009	MTV Movie & TV Awards	Best Breakthrough Performance – Male	Bobb'e J. Thompson	Nominated
