= Fez (nightclub) =

Nightclub in New York City, United States

Coordinates: 40.727633°N 73.993667°W

The Fez under Time Cafe, known as the Fez, was a nightclub and restaurant on Lafayette Street and Great Jones Street in New York City's NoHo District. The club closed in February 2005. It hosted numerous musicians and comedians, including Rufus Wainwright, Stella, Richard Barone, Jonathan Ames, Carly Simon, Chris Mills, Rhett Miller, Jane Siberry, Jill Sobule, Nona Hendryx and Jeff Buckley.

== Cultural references ==
The club is referenced in "The Best Burger in New York", an episode of the New York-based sitcom How I Met Your Mother.
