= Wainy Days =

Internet video series

- DVD cover
- Created by: David Wain
- Starring: David Wain; A. D. Miles; Zandy Hartig; Matt Ballard
- Country of origin: United States
- Original language: English
- No. of seasons: 5
- No. of episodes: 39

Production
- Producers: Jonathan Stern, David Wain
- Camera setup: Single camera
- Running time: 5 minutes (approx.)

Original release
- Network: MyDamnChannel
- Release: July 3, 2007 – January 7, 2012

Wainy Days is a web series starring David Wain that is hosted on the website My Damn Channel. The web series follows a fictionalized version of Wain through his everyday life as he tries to form relationships with numerous women and discusses his problems with his friends at the sweatshop where he works. Elizabeth Banks, Jonah Hill, Julie Bowen, Megan Mullally, Jason Sudeikis, Rob Corddry, Lake Bell, Amanda Peet, Rosemarie DeWitt, Elizabeth Reaser, Thomas Lennon, Joe Lo Truglio, Josh Charles, Lucy Punch, A.D. Miles, Paul Rudd, Michael Ian Black, Rashida Jones, Michael Showalter and various other Stella/The State/Wet Hot American Summer alumni have all guest-starred in various episodes. A DVD containing the first four seasons was released February 14, 2012. In 2013, Blip Partnered with My Damn Channel, leading to season 5 of Wainy Days being premiered simultaneously on Blip and MyDamnChannel.

== Episodes ==
=== Series overview ===
Season	Episodes	Originally aired	
Season	Episodes	First aired	Last aired
1	10	July 30, 2007	October 1, 2007
2	10	November 12, 2007	February 11, 2008
3	6	June 13, 2008	August 25, 2008
4	6	May 6, 2009	June 10, 2010
5	7	December 2, 2011	January 7, 2012

=== Season 1: 2007 ===
#	Title	Writer(s)	Director(s)	Original airdate
1	"Shelly"	David Wain	David Wain	July 30, 2007
David runs into Shelly, an old acquaintance, who may be too good to be true. Guest Star: Elizabeth Banks
2	"The Date"	David Wain	David Wain	August 6, 2007
David and Shelly go out on a date and sparks fly, but a dark reminder of Shelly's past becomes apparent. Guest Stars: Elizabeth Banks and Josh Charles
3	"My Turn"	David Wain	David Wain	August 13, 2007
David decides to take his love life into his own hands.
4	"Cyrano d'Bluetooth"	A. D. Miles	A. D. Miles	August 20, 2007
David becomes infatuated with a woman at the coffee shop, but he does not have the courage to talk to her on his own. Guest Star: Callie Thorne
5	"Walking Tour"	Michael Ian Black	Michael Ian Black	August 27, 2007
A woman asks David for a walking tour of New York City. Guest Star: Kerri Kenney-Silver
6	"A Woman's Touch"	Jonathan Stern	Jonathan Stern	September 3, 2007
David gets in touch with his feminine side. Guest Stars: Michael Ian Black and Rashida Jones
7	"The Bank"	Ian Helfer	Michael Ian Black and Ian Helfer	September 10, 2007
David starts going to a sperm bank. Guest Star: Ken Marino
8	"Plugged"	Jonathan Stern	Jonathan Stern	September 17, 2007
David gets hair plugs in order to better appeal to women. Guest Star: Jason Sudeikis
9	"Dorvid Days"	Matt Spicer & Max Winkler	Max Winkler	September 24, 2007
David travels across the country to see a woman he met online. Guest Stars: Jennifer Westfeldt, Jonah Hill, and Thomas Lennon
10	"The Future"	Jonathan Stern	Jonathan Stern	October 1, 2007
David imagines life in the year 2011. Guest Star: Rob Corddry

=== Season 2: 2007–2008 ===
#	Title	Writer(s)	Director(s)	Original airdate
11	"Zandy"	David Wain	David Wain	November 12, 2007
A new twist affects David's relationship with Zandy.
12	"Happy Endings"	Erica Oyama	Ken Marino	November 19, 2007
David starts getting "happy endings" at a massage parlor.
13	"Wainy Nights"	Ken Marino	Ken Marino	November 26, 2007
David goes out on the town at nighttime. Guest Star: Steve Agee
14	"The Pact"	Jonathan Stern	Jonathan Stern	December 3, 2007
David follows up with Tammy, a friend from elementary school, who made a pact with David that they would have sex if they were not both married by 38. Guest Star: Ken Marino and Missy Yager
15	"Tough Guy"	Joe Lo Truglio	Joe Lo Truglio	December 10, 2007
David gets tough. Guest Stars: Julie Bowen, David Krumholtz, Christopher Mintz-Plasse, and Martin Starr
16	"The Pickup"	Jon Zack	Adam Bernstein	December 31, 2007
A pick-up artist named Alias gives David lessons. Guest Stars: Paul Rudd, Samantha Buck, and Tawny Cypress
17	"Jonah and the Manilow"	Matt Walsh	John Inwood	January 7, 2008
David tries to take a woman to see Barry Manilow in concert. Guest Star: Justin Lord
18	"Sublet"	Zandy Hartig	Jonathan Kesselman	January 28, 2008
David looks at a sublet posting from Craigslist and gets involved with the landlord. Guest Star: Joe Lo Truglio
19	"Carol"	David Wain	David Wain	February 4, 2008
David sees a female psychologist. Guest Stars: Terry Kinney, Talia Balsam, and Scott Sowers
20	"Molly"	David Wain	David Wain	February 11, 2008
David meets a woman in a coffee shop and they go out to a club, but she brings her friend Landon along. Guest Star: Michael Showalter

=== Season 3: 2008 ===
#	Title	Writer(s)	Director(s)	Original airdate
21	"Nan and Lucy"	Jonathan Stern	Jonathan Stern	June 13, 2008
David has two dates in one night and struggles to keep each woman from finding out about the other. Guest Stars: Saffron Burrows, Christine Lakin, and Mike Starr
22	"Rebecca"	Eric Kissack and David Wain	Eric Kissack	June 30, 2008
David follows his father's advice to go to a folk music club to meet women. Guest Stars: Lee Majors, Joe Lo Truglio, Xander Berkeley and Sarah Clarke
23	"Water Cooler"	David Wain	David Wain	July 14, 2008
At work, Zandy tells David that she has been seeing Miles.
24	"The Waindow"	Dave Hewson	Dave Hewson	July 28, 2008
David and Miles make a bet to see if David can pick up a specific woman. Guest Stars: Elizabeth Reaser
25	"Angel"	Jordan Rubin	Danny Leiner	August 11, 2008
An angel teaches David about the importance of life. Guest Stars: Janeane Garofalo, Jeffrey Ross, Ed Helms, Lucy Punch, and Jorma Taccone
26	"Shelly II"	David Wain	David Wain	August 25, 2008
Shelly returns and David gives her another chance. She invites David to a party. Guest Stars: Elizabeth Banks, Alicia Witt, and Joe Lo Truglio

=== Season 4: 2009–2010 ===
#	Title	Writer(s)	Director(s)	Original airdate
27	"Jill"	David Wain	David Wain	May 6, 2009
Zandy sets David up with her friend Jill who is turned on by men with small penises. Guest Star: Amanda Peet
28	"Dance Club"	David Wain	David Wain	May 21, 2009
When David and his friends go to a dance cub, David gets tangled up in a married couple's problems. Guest Stars: Lake Bell and Zak Orth
29	"Animator"	Paul Simms	Paul Simms	June 4, 2009
David becomes involved with a female animator, but he is upset when she starts animating an online cartoon that mocks him. Guest Star: Rosemarie DeWitt
30	"Rochelle – Part 1"	David Wain	David Wain	June 26, 2009
David takes a nice girl named Jeannie out, but gets mixed up with a sexy musician named Rochelle.
31	"Rochelle – Part 2"	David Wain	David Wain	July 24, 2009
David must choose between Jeannie and Rochelle.
32	"Donna"	David Wain	David Wain	June 10, 2010
David meets the divorced owner of a cute country store. Later, they screw in a hammock with their clothes on. Guest Stars: Megan Mullally and Nick Offerman

=== Season 5: 2011–2012 ===
#	Title	Writer(s)	Director(s)	Original airdate
33	"Kelly and Arielle – Part 1"	Ken Marino and David Wain	David Wain	December 2, 2011
David brings Kelly back to his apartment, but she ends up having sex with Chez while he is in the other room.
34	"Kelly and Arielle – Part 2"	Ken Marino and David Wain	David Wain	December 2, 2011
Chez offers David to take him to brunch. While at brunch, David tries talking to a girl by lying about reading Rosewood Junction.
35	"Kelly and Arielle – Part 3"	Ken Marino and David Wain	David Wain	December 9, 2011
Searching for Rosewood Junction on tape, David gets involved with a shopkeeper and her landlord.
36	"Kelly and Arielle – Part 4"	Ken Marino and David Wain	David Wain	December 17, 2011
David and the gang goes to Zandy's ex-boyfriends house to retrieve her Walkman.
37	"Kelly and Arielle – Part 5"	Ken Marino and David Wain	David Wain	December 23, 2011
After listening to Rosewood Junction, David goes on a date with Arielle. Things go wrong after David forgets to ask Arielle's last name.
38	"Kelly and Arielle – Part 6"	Ken Marino and David Wain	David Wain	December 30, 2011
David runs into Kelly at Chez's performance and later go to a bar together. At the bar, they both run into Arielle and leave together when things get heated.
39	"Kelly and Arielle – Part 7"	Ken Marino and David Wain	David Wain	January 7, 2012
David, Kelly, and Arielle go back to a hotel together, but David misses out after taking too long.

== Awards ==
In 2008, Wainy Days won an award and an official honoree from The Webby Awards:

- Best Comedy Series
- Official Honoree – Individual Episode, “The Future”

The following year the show won in the Best Guest Star in a Web Series category at the 1st Streamy Awards.
