= Michael Ian Black =

American comedian and actor (born 1971)

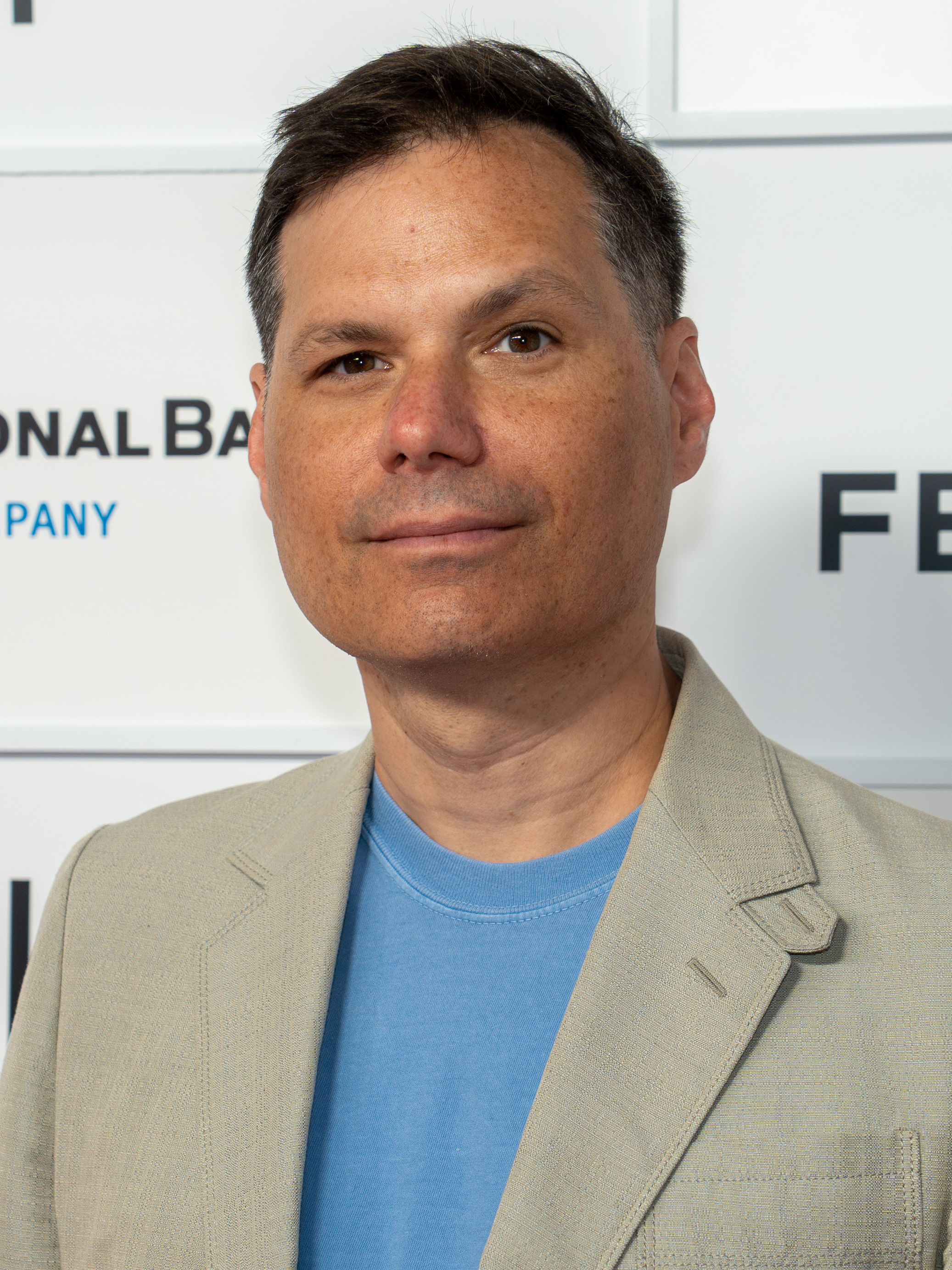
- Black in 2025
- Born: Michael Ian Schwartz; August 12, 1971 (age 55); Chicago, Illinois, U.S.
- Occupations: Comedian; actor; writer; director
- Notable work: The I Love the... series, The State, Stella, Michael & Michael Have Issues, Another Period
- Spouse: Martha Anne Hagen (m. 1998)
- Children: 2
- Website: www.michaelianblack.org

Michael Ian Black (born Michael Ian Schwartz; August 12, 1971) is an American comedian, actor, and writer. He has starred in several TV comedy series, including The State, Viva Variety, Stella, Wet Hot American Summer: First Day of Camp, Michael & Michael Have Issues, and Another Period. In the late 1990s to early 2000s, he was the puppeteer and voice actor for the Pets.com sock puppet dog, and played a supporting character on the NBC drama series Ed. Since 2008 he has written a number of books, including several for children.

== Early life ==
Black was born in Chicago, Illinois, to Jill and Robert Schwartz, a store owner and an executive, respectively. His family is Jewish. He grew up in Hillsborough Township, New Jersey, where he attended Hillsborough High School. He attended Stagedoor Manor summer camp for performing arts.

His parents divorced when he was three years old; his mother, Jill, later came out as a lesbian. Black's father died at age 39 due to a head injury apparently suffered in an assault and allergic reaction during subsequent surgery.

His birth name, Schwartz, is derived from the German word schwarz, which means black. He changed his name to Michael Ian Black to avoid confusion with the actor Mike Schwartz.

Black briefly attended New York University, but dropped out to portray Raphael in the promotional campaign for the Teenage Mutant Ninja Turtles concert tour.

== Career ==
=== 1991–2010 ===
Black began his career as a member of the comedy group The State and was featured on the television show of the same name on MTV. He continued working with members of that group on the show Viva Variety in the role of "Johnny Bluejeans", and in the film Wet Hot American Summer, directed by frequent collaborator David Wain.

Black also appeared on VH1's I Love the... series, his comedy troupe Stella, and in various TV series and films. From 1998 to 2000, he was the puppeteer and voice actor for the Pets.com (and later BarNone) sock puppet, an experience he would later describe as "painful but fun". He also was featured in commercials for Sierra Mist, hosted the first season of NBC's hidden-camera show Spy TV (Miss USA 1996, Ali Landry, replaced him for the second season), made several appearances in the film Big Helium Dog, and had a supporting role on the NBC dramedy Ed.

His dry, sarcastically irreverent commentary on pop culture artifacts on VH1's I Love the '70s/'80s/'90s/New Millennium series added to his and the shows' popularity. Black stated several times on the show that he felt as if he was "doomed to an eternity" of doing the I Love the... series. He also made fun of himself for being a Jewish-American and sarcastically enforcing Jewish stereotypes.

Black is a poker enthusiast and appeared in five episodes of Celebrity Poker Showdown beginning in 2003, playing for the Endeavor House charity. In 2004 and 2006, he played for the charity MAZON: A Jewish Response to Hunger. In 2006, he came in third (receiving $100,000 for his charity). Black was praised for his humor and his skilled poker play by Dave Foley, host of Celebrity Poker Showdown, and by poker experts Phil Gordon and Phil Hellmuth.

In the latter part of 2004, he acted as guest host of CBS's The Late Late Show while auditioning for the permanent hosting role. He was a finalist for the position, but the job eventually went to Craig Ferguson. He is also an occasional contributor to the online edition of McSweeney's, where he writes a column titled "Michael Ian Black Is a Very Famous Celebrity".

Black, along with fellow State members Michael Showalter and David Wain, co-starred in and cowrote the Comedy Central series Stella, a television adaptation of their popular stage show. The ten-episode first season debuted in June 2005 and was not renewed for a second season.

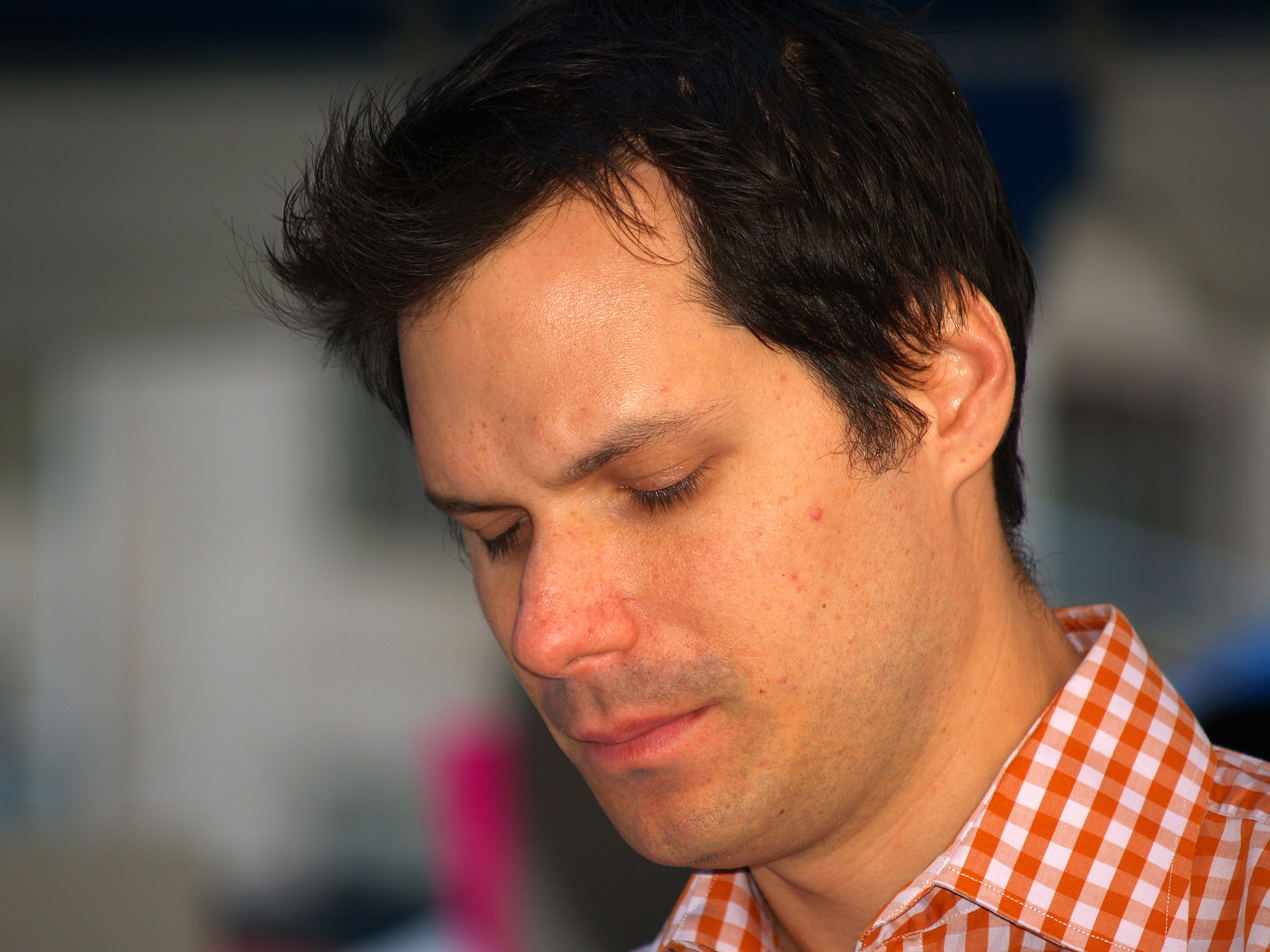
Black at the 2007 Brooklyn Book Festival

Black wrote the screenplays for two feature film comedies —Wedding Daze (2006) and Run, Fat Boy, Run (2007, co-written with leading actor Simon Pegg). Black also directed Wedding Daze which stars Jason Biggs, Joe Pantoliano, and Isla Fisher.

Black also had some minor screen credits. He appeared twice on the Adult Swim show Tom Goes to the Mayor, was a guest voice on Seth Green's stop-motion show Robot Chicken, and later did a bit for Tim and Eric Awesome Show, Great Job!. He appeared on the Comedy Central shows Crank Yankers and Reno 911!. He had a cameo in David Wain's 2007 film The Ten as a prison guard. In September 2007, he released his first stand-up comedy album, I Am a Wonderful Man. In addition, he starred on the TV series Reaper as a gay demon trying to destroy the devil through acts of kindness. In 2008, Black published a book titled My Custom Van ... And 50 Other Mind-Blowing Essays That Will Blow Your Mind All Over Your Face. Also in 2008, he hosted Reality Bites Back, a scripted reality show on Comedy Central.

Black then developed another show for Comedy Central, Michael Ian Black Doesn't Understand. The concept was later retooled as Michael & Michael Have Issues; a pilot episode, featuring Michael Showalter, was shot in August 2008. Comedy Central confirmed in February 2009 that a seven-episode run of the show would air in July.

His first children's book, Chicken Cheeks, was published by Simon & Schuster Children's Publishing on January 6, 2009. Kevin Hawkes illustrated the book. In a starred review, Kirkus called the book "a perfect collaboration of text and illustration." An alternative review was aired on The Michael Showalter Showalter.

Black appeared in several Sierra Mist and Klondike commercials, as well as an eBay commercial with Showalter.

On February 21, 2009, Black instigated a "Celeb-Feud" — or as he called it, the "World's First Twitter War" — with LeVar Burton to see if he could muster more Twitter followers than Burton. Black dubbed the feud "LeWar."

=== 2010–present ===
In 2010 Black started the podcast Mike and Tom Eat Snacks with his former Ed castmate Tom Cavanagh. Black and Meghan McCain cowrote the book America, You Sexy Bitch: A Love Letter to Freedom in June 2012. The two took a road trip across America during the summer of 2011, documenting how Americans were living.

In 2012, he starred as the host Bill Tundle in the web series Burning Love, a spoof of the TV series The Bachelor and The Bachelorette. He also co-hosted G4 TV with Candace Bailey that year. He has occasionally appeared as a guest on Red Eye with Greg Gutfeld. He stars in Adult Swim's late-night infomercial parody, You're Whole, as Randall Tyree Mandersohn. After a guest appearance in the pilot, it was announced in 2013 that Black would join the FOX comedy Us & Them in a regular role.

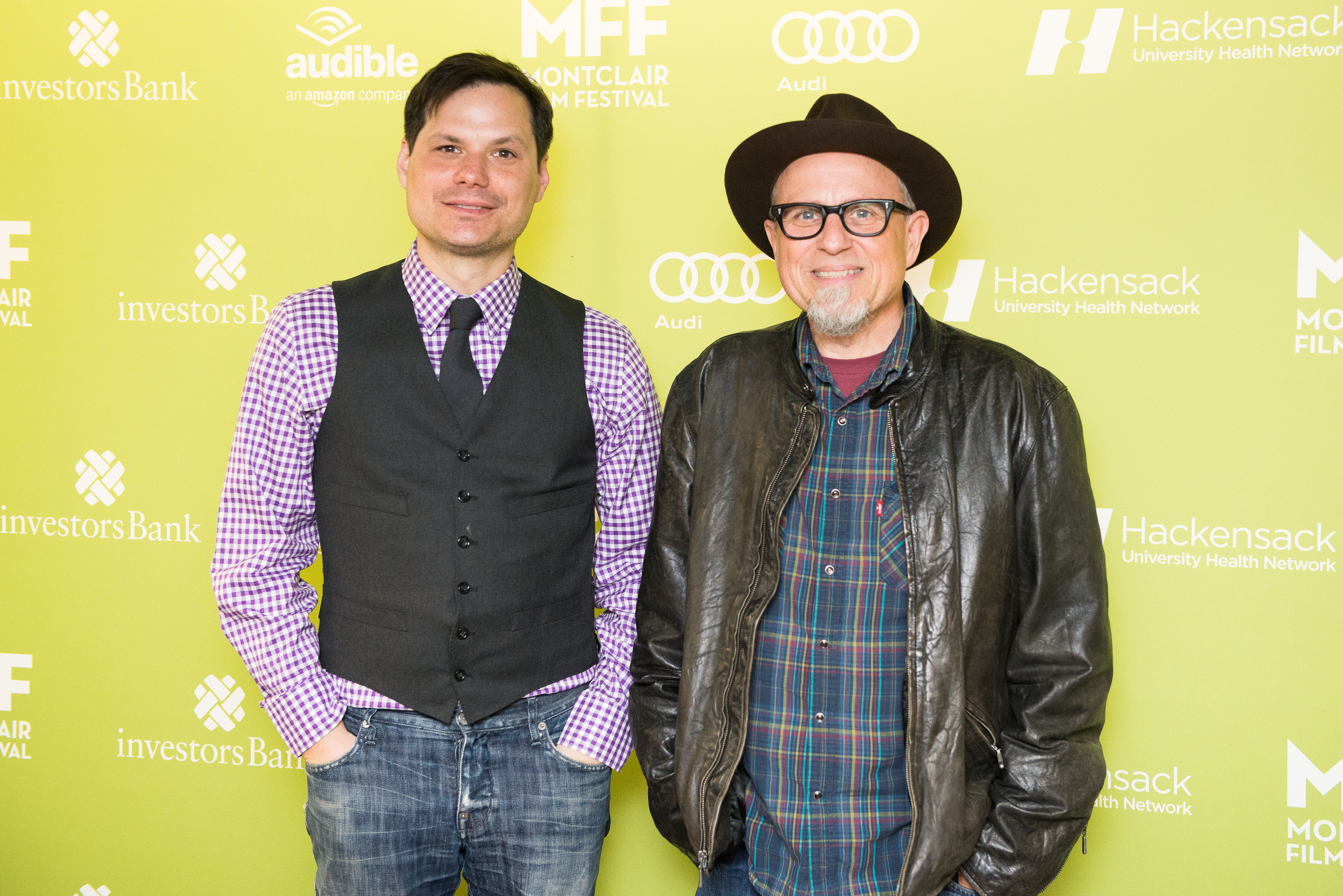
Black and Bobcat Goldthwait at the 2015 Montclair Film Festival

In 2013, he and Michael Showalter launched the podcast Topics. Alongside Jason Ritter, Alexis Bledel, and Kerri Kenney-Silver, Black appeared in the unaired 2013 Fox sitcom Us & Them, a 13-episode US adaptation of the hit UK sitcom Gavin & Stacey, which was canceled while the seventh episode was in production. Fox decided not to air any of the episodes. Black played the role of Brian.

He co-hosted the single-season 2013 game show Trust Me, I'm a Game Show Host alongside D.L. Hughley. He was also a co-host on Duck Quacks Don't Echo, and one of the guest stars on the short-lived Steve Carell 2014 improv sketch show Riot. On June 11, 2014, he appeared on Ken Reid's TV Guidance Counselor Podcast.

Black played Peepers, an uptight butler, on the Comedy Central series Another Period. He also played the role of Daniel on the TVLand series The Jim Gaffigan Show, as well as McKinley in the prequel to 2001's Wet Hot American Summer, titled Wet Hot American Summer: First Day of Camp.

Black hosts How to Be Amazing, an in-depth interview podcast show, produced by Black, Jennifer Brennan, and Mary Shimkin. It is largely recorded at Argot Studios in New York City. In June 2017, Black recorded an episode in Los Angeles with pop star Katy Perry for her livestream marathon, Katy Perry Live: Witness World Wide.

Black appears in Smosh: The Movie as Steve YouTube, the fictional germophobic creator and CEO of YouTube. The movie premiered on July 24, 2015, at VidCon 2015 in Los Angeles.

In 2018, Black began hosting a new podcast titled Obscure with Michael Ian Black, in which he reads works of classic literature and comments on the books as he reads. In Season 1 he reads Jude the Obscure by author Thomas Hardy. In Season 2 he reads Mary Shelley's Frankenstein. In Season 3 he reads Emily Brontë's Wuthering Heights.

In May 2020, Black returned to a rebooted Reno 911! in a new recurring role as Captain Schwartz, named for his birthname. Schwartz is the commander of a heavily militarized parody of Hatzalah, the Jewish volunteer medical emergency service.

Since 2024, Black has been a panelist on CNN's American news game show Have I Got News For You, alongside fellow panelist Amber Ruffin and host Roy Wood, Jr.

== Personal life ==
Black married Martha Anne Hagen, a wardrobe stylist, in 1998. They have two children, Elijah (b. 2001) and Ruthie (b. 2003). They reside in Savannah, Georgia.

Black was an atheist, but is now a "reluctant deist".

== Bibliography ==
=== Books ===
- My Custom Van: And 50 Other Mind-Blowing Essays that Will Blow Your Mind All Over Your Face (2008)
- You're Not Doing It Right: Tales of Marriage, Sex, Death, and Other Humiliations (2012)
- America, You Sexy Bitch: A Love Letter to Freedom (with Meghan McCain; 2012)
- Navel Gazing: True Tales of Bodies, Mostly Mine (but also my mom's, which I know sounds weird) (2016)
- A Better Man: A (Mostly Serious) Letter to My Son (2020)

==== Children's books ====
- Chicken Cheeks (2009)
- The Purple Kangaroo (2009)
- A Pig Parade Is a Terrible Idea (2011)
- I'm Bored (2012)
- Naked! (2014)
- Cock-a-Doodle-Doo-Bop! (2015)
- A Child's First Book of Trump (2016) ISBN 978-1481488006
- I'm Sad (2018)
- I'm Sorry (2021)
- I'm Worried (2021)
- I'm Busy (2026)

=== Articles ===
- "My application essay to Brown (rejected)". Shouts & Murmurs. The New Yorker. 97 (7): 21. April 5, 2021. (Note: Online version is titled "A pandemic college essay that probably won't get you into Brown".)

———————

== Discography ==
- Comedy For Gracious Living by The State (recorded 1996, released 2010)
- I am a Wonderful Man (2007)
- Very Famous (2011)
- Noted Expert (2016)

== Filmography ==
=== Film ===
Year	Title	Role	Notes
1991	Cults: Saying No Under Pressure	Male student	Documentary
1999	Big Helium Dog	Martin Huber	
2000	The Bogus Witch Project	Stephen Hawking	
2001	Wet Hot American Summer	McKinley	
2002	Stella shorts	Michael	27 short films
2005	The Baxter	Ed	
2005	Alchemy	Jerry (voice)	
2005	Partner(s)	Christopher	
2006	Wedding Daze		Writer, director
2007	Run, Fatboy, Run		Writer
2007	The Ten	Prison Guard Jamberg Saivon	
2007	Reno 911!: Miami	Ron of Ron's Tattoo	
2011	Take Me Home Tonight	Pete Bering	
2012	Wanderlust	Himself	
2012	This Is 40	Accountant	
2013	Hell Baby	Dr. Marshall	
2014	They Came Together	Trevor	
2015	Smosh: The Movie	Steve YouTube	
2016	Slash	Denis	
2016	Folk Hero & Funny Guy	Randy	
2019	Sextuplets	Doug	
2022	Linoleum	Tony	
2023	Spinning Gold	Bill Aucoin	
2025	Superman	Cleavis Thornwaite	
2026	Gail Daughtry and the Celebrity Sex Pass	Star Maps Salesman	

=== Television ===
Year	Title	Role	Notes
1992–93	You Wrote It, You Watch It	Various	25 episodes; also writer
1993–95	The State	Various	27 episodes; also co-creator, writer
1994	NYPD Blue	Joey Diaz	Episode: "Rockin' Robin"
1997	Viva Variety	Johnny Blue Jeans	16 episodes; also co-creator, writer
1999	Hercules: The Animated Series	Voice	Episode: "Hercules and the Romans"
2000–04	Ed	Phil Stubbs	83 episodes
2001	Spy TV	Himself (host)	11 episodes
2002	I Love the '80s	Himself	9 episodes
2003	I Love the '70s	Himself	7 episodes
2003	I Love the '80s Strikes Back	Himself	6 episodes
2003	Crank Yankers	Voice	2 episodes
2003–06	Celebrity Poker Showdown	Himself	5 episodes
2003–22	Reno 911!	Various	8 episodes
2004	I Love the '90s	Himself	7 episodes
2004, 2008	Comedy Central Presents	Himself	2 episodes
2005	I Love the '90s: Part Deux	Himself	3 episodes
2005	I Love the '80s 3-D	Himself	10 episodes
2005	I Love the Holidays	Himself	
2005	Stella	Michael	10 episodes; also co-creator, writer
2005–06	Tom Goes to the Mayor	Dr. Ian Black (voice)	2 episodes
2006	I Love Toys	Himself	
2006	I Love the '70s: Volume 2	Himself	7 episodes
2006	Cheap Seats: Without Ron Parker	EZtech Executive / Hugh FitzSimmons	2 episodes
2006–12	Robot Chicken	Himself / Mo-Larr / E! Entertainment Host / Mr. Ollivander (voices)	3 episodes
2007	Wainy Days	Waiter	2 episodes
2008	I Love the New Millennium	Himself	7 episodes
2008	Reality Bites Back	Himself (host)	8 episodes
2008	The Xtacles	Chase Fontaine (voice)	2 episodes
2008–09	Reaper	Steve	6 episodes
2009	Michael & Michael Have Issues	Himself	7 episodes; also co-creator, writer
2010	Mercy	Mark Gunther	Episode: "I Saw This Pig and I Thought of You"
2010–11	Backwash	Fleming	Web-series, 11 episodes
2011	Michael Ian Black: Very Famous	Himself	Stand-up special
2012–13	Burning Love	Bill Tundle	37 episodes
2012–14	You're Whole	Randall Tyree Mandersohn	8 episodes; also creator, writer
2013	Trust Me, I'm a Game Show Host	Himself (co-host)	10 episodes
2013–14	Us & Them	Brian	7 episodes
2013–22	Inside Amy Schumer	Martin Daniels / Lawyer / various	5 episodes
2014	Duck Quacks Don't Echo	Himself (co-host)	12 episodes
2014	Maron	Michael Ian Black	Episode: "Marc on Talking Dead"
2015	Deadbeat	TJ	Episode: "The Blowfish Job"
2015	Wet Hot American Summer: First Day of Camp	McKinley	7 episodes
2015–16	The Jim Gaffigan Show	Daniel Benjamin	22 episodes
2015–18	Another Period	Peepers	30 episodes
2016	Easiest Game Show Ever	Himself (host)	
2016	Michael Ian Black: Noted Expert	Himself	Stand-up special
2017	Wet Hot American Summer: Ten Years Later	McKinley / George H. W. Bush	7 episodes
2017	The High Court with Doug Benson	Guest bailiff	Episode: "Snakes in the Drain"
2017	Dogs in a Park	Various dogs (voice)	8 episodes
2017	The Chris Gethard Show	Himself	Episode: "Everything is Terrifying"
2018	The Good Fight	Stephen Rankin-Hall	2 episodes
2018–19	Insatiable	Pastor Mike	5 episodes
2018	Bobcat Goldthwait's Misfits & Monsters	Satan	Episode: "Devil in the Blue Jeans"
2019	Bless This Mess	Cheff	Episode: "Omaha"
2020	Helpsters	Sea Lovin' Sam	Episode: "Amazing Atticus/Sea Lovin' Sam"
2022	Search Party	Wally	Episode: "The Gospel of Judas"
2022	Would I Lie to You? (US)	Himself	Episode: "Boy in a Barrel"
2024–present	Have I Got News For You (US)	Himself	Regular panelist
2025	Peacemaker	Cleavis Thornwaite	Episode: "The Ties That Grind"

Preceded by start of series	Spy TV host Season 1 (2001)	Succeeded by Ali Landry (Season 2)
