= The Ten (film) =

- Theatrical release poster
- Directed by: David Wain
- Written by: David Wain; Ken Marino
- Produced by: David Wain; Morris S. Levy; Paul Rudd; Rashida Jones; Ken Marino; Jonathan Stern
- Starring: Adam Brody; Rob Corddry; Famke Janssen; Kerri Kenney-Silver; Ken Marino; Gretchen Mol; Oliver Platt; Paul Rudd; Winona Ryder; Liev Schreiber; Justin Theroux; Jessica Alba
- Cinematography: Yaron Orbach
- Edited by: Eric Kissack
- Music by: Craig Wedren
- Distributed by: ThinkFilm
- Release dates: January 19, 2007 (Sundance); August 3, 2007 (United States)
- Running time: 93 minutes
- Countries: United States; Mexico
- Languages: English; Spanish
- Box office: $785,528

The Ten is a 2007 anthology comedy film directed by David Wain, who also co-wrote the screenplay with Ken Marino. It was released through ThinkFilm. The film was released on August 3, 2007. The DVD was released on January 15, 2008. It is an international co-production between the United States and Mexico. It received mixed reviews.

== Plot ==
Ten stories, each inspired by one of the Ten Commandments:

1 "Thou Shalt Worship No God Before Me"

A man (Adam Brody) becomes a celebrity after falling out of a plane and becoming permanently embedded in the ground, thanks to a superstar agent (Ron Silver). After a swift rise to stardom, he becomes prideful and arrogant, referring to himself as a god. His career falls apart and he loses everything. His fiancée (Winona Ryder) leaves him for a TV anchor man.

2 "Thou Shalt Not Take the Lord's Name in Vain"

A librarian (Gretchen Mol) has a sexual awakening in Mexico with a swarthy local (Justin Theroux) who turns out to be Jesus Christ. She eventually settles down and marries her coworker (A. D. Miles), but is secretly reminded of her fling with Jesus whenever her family prays before a meal.

3 "Thou Shalt Not Murder"

A doctor (Ken Marino) kills his patient by leaving a pair of scissors inside her abdomen during surgery. Despite expecting the charges to be dropped because he left the scissors in "as a goof", the judge and jury sentence him to life in prison. The judge also disbars the plaintiff's lawyer, who is then told that he should consider a job as a tour guide at the local nuclear plant.

4 "Honor Thy Mother and Thy Father"

A white mother (Kerri Kenney-Silver) enlists an Arnold Schwarzenegger impersonator (Oliver Platt) to be a father figure to her black children after telling them he is their biological father. It is revealed that their father is in reality Arsenio Hall, but they decide to keep the Arnold impersonator as part of the family; despite not being able to imitate Arsenio, he can do a pretty good Eddie Murphy impression.

5 "Thou Shalt Not Covet Thy Neighbor's Goods"

A police detective (Liev Schreiber) covets his neighbor's (Joe Lo Truglio) CAT Scan machine. After continuously buying additional CAT Scan machines to one up each other, both of their wives leave them. After hitting rock bottom, the two neighbors reconcile and go out for a drink. Meanwhile, a disaster at a nuclear power plant during a school tour (led by the former lawyer from the third story) leaves a busload of school children in need of several CAT Scan machines. They arrive at the neighbors' houses but the doors are locked and the two men are at the bar, so all the children die.

6 "Thou Shalt Not Covet Thy Neighbor's Wife"

A prisoner (Rob Corddry) desires a fellow inmate's "bitch" (the doctor from the third story) for his own.

7 "Thou Shalt Not Steal"

The woman (Winona Ryder) from the first story, having recently married the TV anchor man, falls in love with a ventriloquist (Michael Ziegfeld's) puppet, steals it and runs off to have a romantic relationship with it.

8 "Thou Shalt Not Bear False Witness"

The ventriloquist, having lost his dummy and become a homeless heroin addict, is told by another homeless man a story about an animated rhinoceros (voice of H. Jon Benjamin) who earns a reputation as a liar. After learning that a band of weiner dogs is intent on infecting others with a fatal STD, the rhinoceros tries to warn everyone. Unfortunately, nobody believes him, and they all succumb to the STD (following an orgy). It is then revealed that the rhinoceros now sells drugs to the homeless men.

9 "Thou Shalt Not Commit Adultery"

Jeff Reigert (Paul Rudd) presents all of these stories to the audience, while struggling with his own moral dilemma: having to choose between his beautiful wife (Famke Janssen) and his also beautiful but somewhat younger mistress (Jessica Alba).

10 "Remember the Sabbath and Keep It Holy"

The husband from the second story (A.D. Miles) skips church with his family to get naked with his friends and listen to Roberta Flack.

== Cast ==
- Paul Rudd as Jeff Reigert, Gretchen's husband and a man who hosts the stories and has an affair, but ends up reconciling with his wife.
- Winona Ryder as Kelly LaFonda, Stephen's ex-fiancée who steals a puppet.
- Famke Janssen as Gretchen Reigert, Jeff's wife who reconciles with him in the end.
- Jessica Alba as Liz Anne Blazer, Jeff's young mistress who he has an affair with, but ends up dumping him.
- Adam Brody as Stephen Montgomery, Kelly's ex-fiancée who is embedded in the ground as the result of a skydive accident.
- Justin Theroux as Jesus H. Christ, the son of god who is portrayed as a seductive Mexican.
- Oliver Platt as Marc Jacobson, an impersonator who becomes the adopted dad of 2 black teens.
- Liev Schreiber as Ray Johnson, a police detective who ends up competing with his neighbor by purchasing excessive CAT-Scan machines.
- Gretchen Mol as Gloria Jennings, a librarian, Noah's mother and Oliver's wife who has a fling with the Spanish Jesus,
- Rob Corddry as Duane Rosenblum, a prisoner in the jail Glenn is sent to and wishes to have Glenn's raper as his own.
- Michael Ziegfeld as Harlan Swallow / Gary, a ventriloquist whose puppet, Gary, is stolen by Kelly and is now a drug-addicted hobo.
- Ken Marino as Dr. Glenn Richie, a joke-loving doctor convicted of murder that he insists was "a goof".
- Janeane Garofalo as Beth, an employee at the nuclear power plant who panics when minors have been exposed to radiation.
- Mather Zickel as Louis La Fonda, a news reporter who publishes Stephen's situation from the skydiving incident and becomes Kelly's new husband.
- Kerri Kenney-Silver as Bernice Jaffe, a single mother to 2 African-American twin teens who welcomes Marc as her son's new dad.
- A.D. Miles as Oliver Jennings, Noah's father and Gloria's husband who hosts a nude party on a Sunday
- Michael Showalter as Police Lieutenant Flarn Bairn, a cop Swallow reports the theft of Gary too.
- David Wain as Abe Grossman, a reporter who interviews Stephen after his accident.
- Thomas Lennon as Scotty Pale, one of Paul's friends.
- Bobby Cannavale as Marty, Oliver's friend who joins him at his naked party.
- Ron Silver as Fielding Barnes, an agent who makes Stephen a star, but ends up deserting him.
- Joe Lo Truglio as Paul, Ray's neighbor who battles him through purchasing lots of CAT-Scan machines.
- Robert Ben Garant as Bob, the Foreman for the jury at Dr. Ritchie's trial.
- Jason Sudeikis as Tony Contiella, the widower husband of Dr. Ritchie's murdered victim who was a temp for Gloria when she took a vacation to Mexico.
- Kevin Allison as Stanley
- Rashida Jones as Rebecca, a hostess who introduces Swallow and Gary.
- Jon Hamm as Charles, a flight instructor to Stephen
- Tommy Nelson as Noah Jennings, Gloria and Oliver's son.
- Michael Ian Black as Prison Guard
- Cedric Sanders as Greg Jaffe
- H. Jon Benjamin voices The Lying Rhino, a deceptive animated rhino whose deception caused him to be helpless in halting an orgy caused by sexually transmitted Dachshunds. He is portrayed by Peter Salett in the live-action part of the movie.
- John Tormey as Junkie Jerry Park
- Jason Antoon as Salazar 'Fred' McBairn

== Reception ==
The film received mixed reviews. According to the review aggregator website Rotten Tomatoes, 35% of critics have given the film a positive review based on 82 reviews, with an average rating of 5.12/10. The site's critics consensus reads, "Although a few of the sketches that make up The Ten are humorous, the uneven and random tone of the film cause it to fall apart." At Metacritic, the film has a weighted average score of 50 out of 100 based on 22 critics, indicating "mixed or average reviews".
