= David Wain =

American writer, director, actor, and comedian (born 1969)

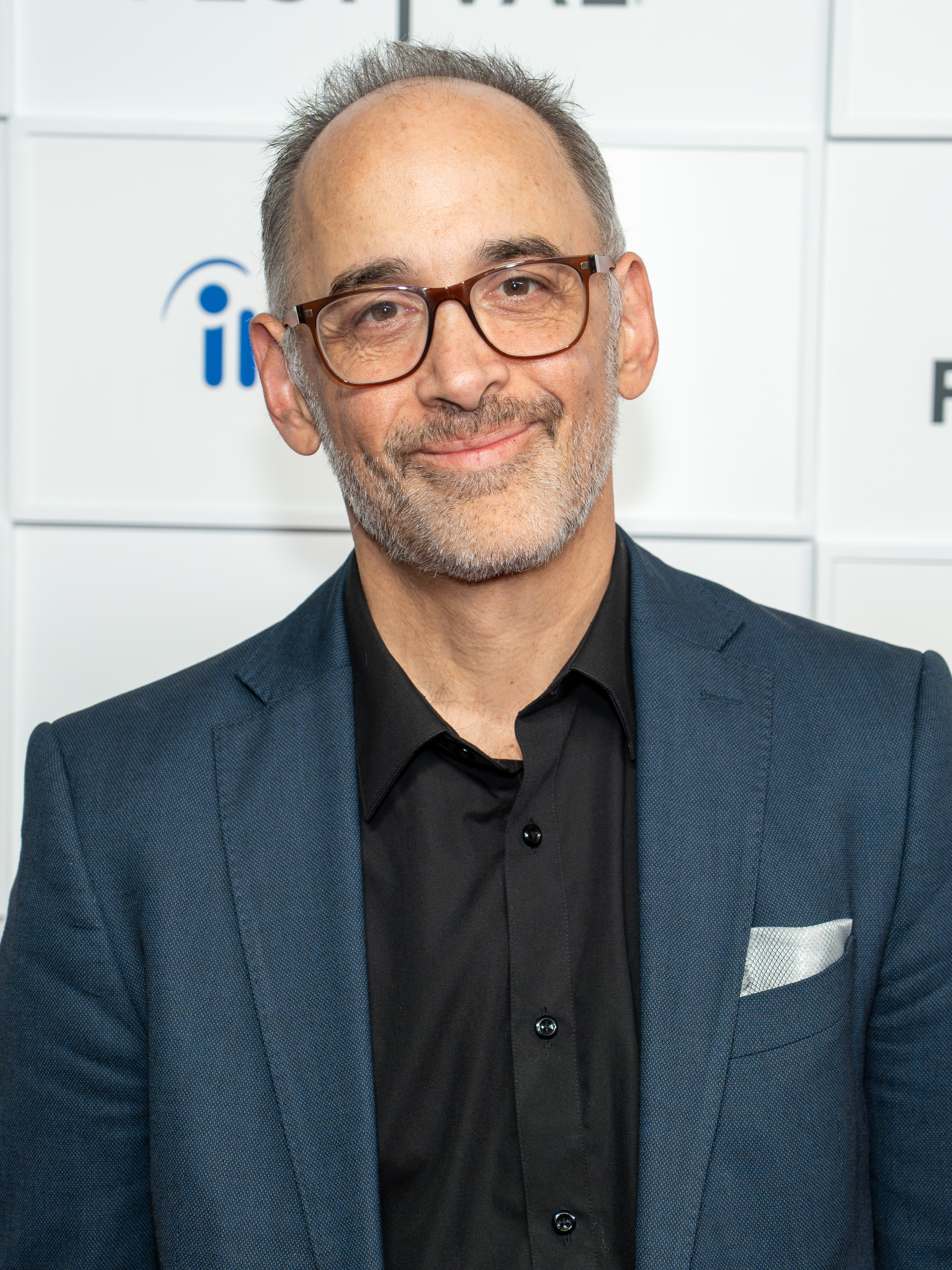
- Wain in 2025
- Born: David Benjamin Wain; August 1, 1969 (age 57); Shaker Heights, Ohio, U.S.
- Education: New York University
- Occupations: Comedian; actor; director; writer
- Years active: 1991–present
- Notable work: Wet Hot American Summer; Role Models; Wanderlust; They Came Together
- Spouse: Zandy Hartig (m. 2009; div. 2015)
- Children: 2
- Website: davidwain.com

David Benjamin Wain (born August 1, 1969) is an American comedian, writer, actor, musician, and director. He has co-written and directed seven feature films, including Wet Hot American Summer (2001), Role Models (2008), Wanderlust (2012), and They Came Together (2014). He has also served as a creator, producer, writer and director on a number of television series, including Wet Hot American Summer: First Day of Camp, Wet Hot American Summer: Ten Years Later, Childrens Hospital, Medical Police, and Mr. Throwback. He has had small roles in most of the films and TV series he has produced or directed. Wain had a starring voice role as The Warden on the 2008–2014 Adult Swim animated series Superjail!, and has provided the voices for Courtney Wheeler and Grover Fischoeder on Bob's Burgers since 2012.

He began his career as a member of the sketch comedy troupe The State. The group had their own TV show on MTV from 1993 to 1995, The State, for which Wain directed many of the sketches. He is also a member of the comedy trio Stella, along with two other members of The State who were also involved in Wet Hot American Summer, Michael Ian Black and Michael Showalter. The three wrote and starred in short films or skits called the Stella shorts, as well as the 2005 TV series Stella. He is the founder and drummer of the garage band the Middle Aged Dad Jam Band.

== Early life ==
Wain was born to a Jewish family in Shaker Heights, Ohio, the son of Nina (née Saul) and Norman Wain. As a young man, Wain went to a summer camp in Canaan, Maine, on which Wet Hot American Summer was loosely based.

== Career ==
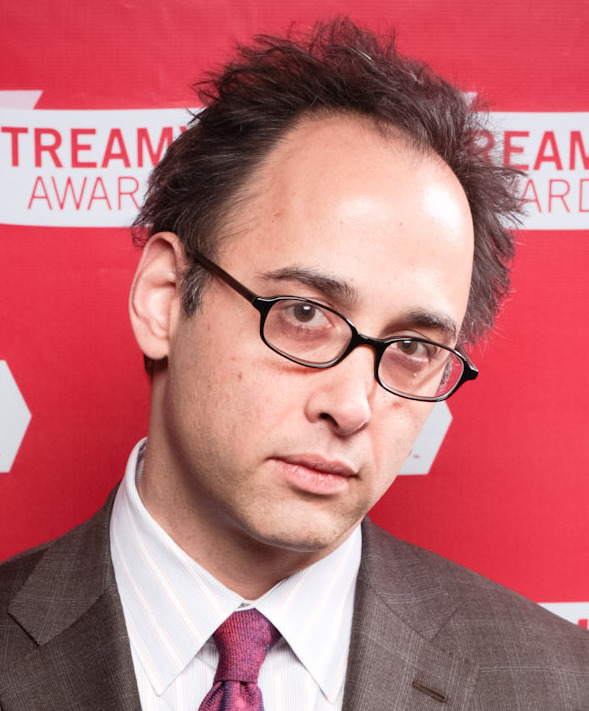
Wain in 2010

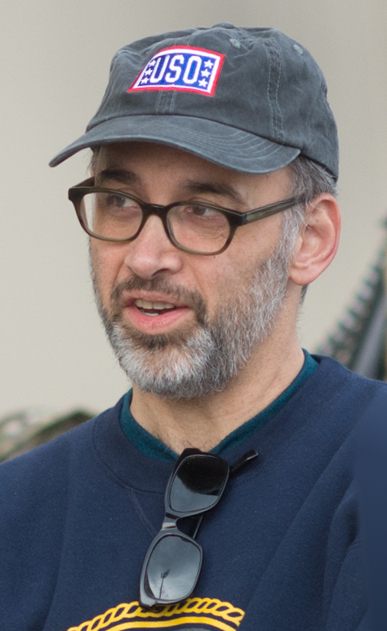
Wain in 2015

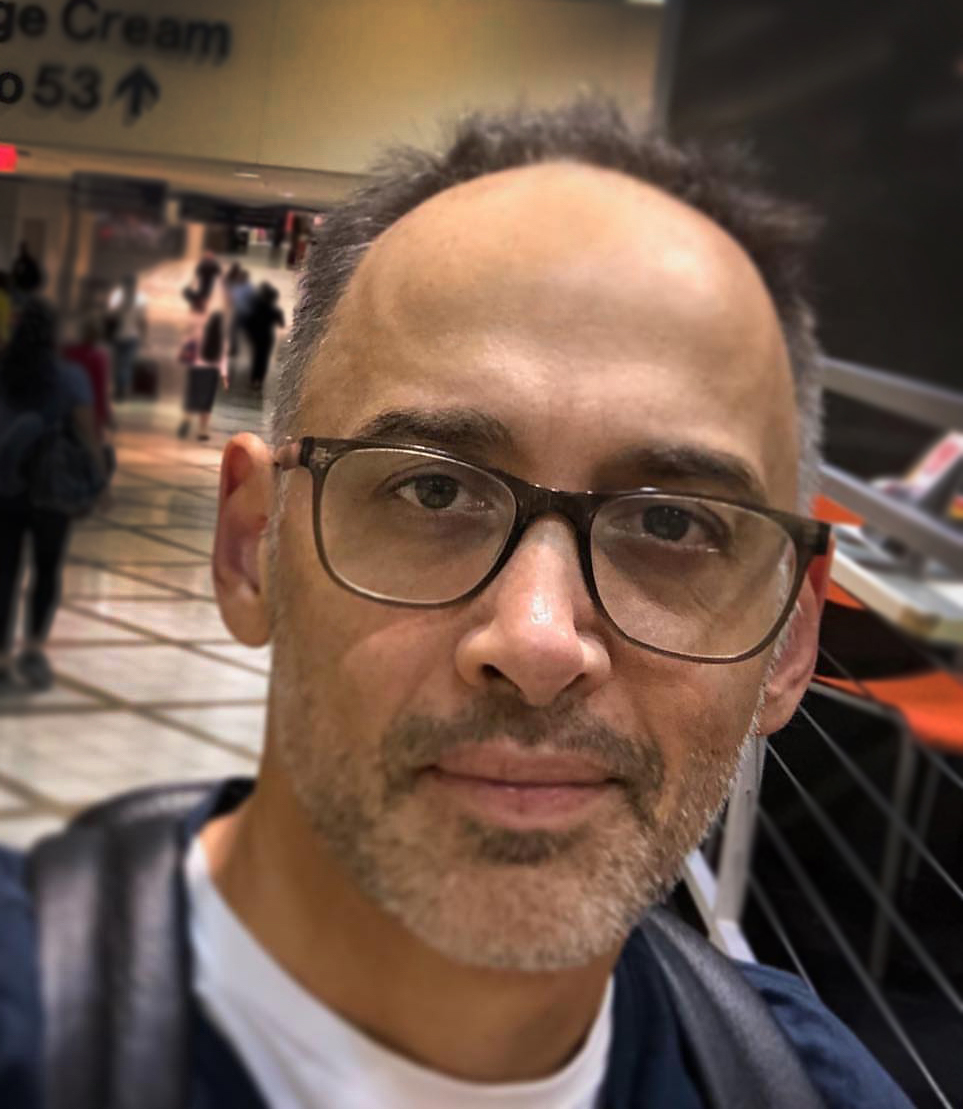
Wain in 2019

In 1988 while attending NYU film school, Wain became a founding member of the sketch comedy group The New Group. This group later came to be known as The State, and in 1993 he and his fellow members created and starred in The State, a sketch show that lasted 26 episodes on MTV. Wain and Michael Patrick Jann directed most of the show's sketches.

In 1997, Wain, Michael Ian Black, and Michael Showalter formed the comedy trio Stella.

Wain's first feature film, Wet Hot American Summer (2001), was an absurdist summer camp comedy starring Janeane Garofalo, David Hyde Pierce, Molly Shannon, Paul Rudd, Christopher Meloni, Bradley Cooper, Amy Poehler, Ken Marino and Elizabeth Banks. Wain directed the film, and co-wrote and co-produced it with Showalter, who also plays a lead role.

His second feature film The Ten, starring Winona Ryder and Paul Rudd (and a large ensemble cast of well-known actors), had a short theatrical run and was released on DVD on January 15, 2008.

Wain's third feature, Role Models, starring Paul Rudd, Seann William Scott, Christopher Mintz-Plasse, Jane Lynch and Elizabeth Banks, was his first widely released film. Released in theaters on November 7, 2008, the film received positive reviews from critics and fans alike, as well as earning $19 million on its opening weekend.

Wain starred in a web series titled Wainy Days on the website My Damn Channel, which ran for five seasons and ended in January 2012. The series follows a fictionalized version of Wain through his everyday life as he tries to romance numerous women and discusses his problems with his friends at the sweatshop where he works. Elizabeth Banks, Jonah Hill, Jason Sudeikis, Rob Corddry, Thomas Lennon, Josh Charles, Paul Rudd, and Michael Ian Black, and various other Stella, The State and Wet Hot American Summer alumni have all guest-starred in various episodes. The recurring cast included A.D. Miles, Matt Ballard and Zandy Hartig, who was instrumental in the creation of the series.

As one third of the comedy troupe Stella, Wain has co-hosted the long running nightclub show in New York City, toured the United States and made a series of shorts with the group, and eventually help create a 2005 series on Comedy Central based on their routines.

Wain is featured as the voice of The Warden in the animated series Superjail!. He was a featured commentator in the I Love the 70s series, I Love the 90s Part Deux series, and the weekly VH1 show Best Week Ever.. With The State, Wain co-wrote the book State by State with The State. He has appeared in such movies as The Baxter, Keeping the Faith and Role Models. Wain's fourth feature film, Wanderlust, was released on February 24, 2012. It stars Jennifer Aniston, Paul Rudd, Malin Akerman and Alan Alda. Wain directed the film, from a screenplay he wrote with Ken Marino, and has a cameo in the film as a TV weatherman.

His fifth feature, the romantic parody They Came Together, was released in June 2014. The cast includes Paul Rudd, Amy Poehler, Ed Helms, Cobie Smulders, Max Greenfield, and Christopher Meloni. Wain and Showalter co-wrote the eight-episode Netflix prequel Wet Hot American Summer: First Day of Camp based on the 2001 film with almost the entire cast of the original film returning. The series premiered on July 31, 2015, and was more well received by critics. He returned to co-write and direct another Netflix sequel Wet Hot American Summer: Ten Years Later, which premiered in 2017.

In 2018 Wain directed A Futile and Stupid Gesture, a feature film biography of National Lampoon founder Doug Kenney, starring Will Forte, Domhnall Gleeson and Joel McHale.

In the COVID-19 pandemic, Wain founded the Middle Aged Dad Jam Band, in which he plays drums alongside fellow State alumnus Ken Marino as well as four other dads, and his son.

== Personal life ==
Wain lives in Los Angeles. He has two sons and is divorced from Zandy Hartig, an actress and producer.

== Filmography ==
Key
| † | Denotes works that have not yet been released |

=== Film ===
| Year | Title | Director | Writer | Producer | Notes |
|---|---|---|---|---|---|
| 1992 | Aisle Six | Yes | Yes | Yes | Short film; also editor |
| 2001 | Wet Hot American Summer | Yes | Yes | Co-producer | |
| 2007 | The Ten | Yes | Yes | Yes | |
| 2008 | Role Models | Yes | Yes | No | |
| 2012 | Wanderlust | Yes | Yes | Yes | |
| 2014 | They Came Together | Yes | Yes | Executive | |
| 2018 | A Futile and Stupid Gesture | Yes | No | Executive | |
| 2026 | Gail Daughtry and the Celebrity Sex Pass | Yes | Yes | Yes | |

Acting roles

| Year | Title | Role | Notes |
|---|---|---|---|
| 2000 | Keeping the Faith | Steve Posner | |
| 2000 | Bamboozled | Bunning | |
| 2001 | Wet Hot American Summer | Paco | |
| 2003 | The Third Date | Ralph | Short film |
| 2004 | Along Came Polly | Wedding Videographer | Uncredited |
| 2005 | The Baxter | Louis Lewis | |
| 2006 | Delirious | Byron | |
| 2007 | The Ten | Abe Grossman / Cartoon Voices | |
| 2007 | Reno 911!: Miami | Breen the Plumber | |
| 2007 | Puberty: The Movie | Principal Kirkpatrick | |
| 2008 | The Guitar | Phone Man | |
| 2008 | Role Models | Chevron Baine | |
| 2009 | I Love You, Man | Wedding Photographer | |
| 2012 | Sleepwalk with Me | Pete | |
| 2012 | Thanks for Sharing | Addict #2 | |
| 2013 | Hell Baby | Dr. Marsden | |
| 2013 | She Said, She Said | Mediator | Short film |
| 2014 | They Came Together | Keith | |
| 2016 | Brother Nature | Uncle Mel | |
| 2017 | Fun Mom Dinner | Wayne | |
| 2018 | My Dead Dad's Porno Tapes | Narrator | Documentary short |
| 2018 | A Futile and Stupid Gesture | Interviewer | |
| 2018 | Under the Eiffel Tower | Frank | |
| 2018 | Dog Days | Wacky Wayne | |
| 2022 | Kimi | Angela's Dentist | |
| 2022 | The Bob's Burgers Movie | Grover Fischoeder (voice) | Voice role |
| 2025 | The Napa Boys | Wilbur Winejudge | |
| 2026 | Gail Daughtry and the Celebrity Sex Pass | People Magazine Editor Teleman Greevis | |
| 2026 | Christmas at the Kringles | Noel Tannebaum | |

=== Television ===
| Year | Title | Director | Writer | Producer | Notes |
|---|---|---|---|---|---|
| 1992–1993 | You Wrote It, You Watch It | Yes | Yes | | |
| 1993–1995 | The State | Yes | Yes | | |
| 1995 | The State's 43rd Annual All-Star Halloween Special | Yes | Yes | | TV special |
| 1997 | Apartment 2F | Yes | Yes | | |
| 1999 | Random Play | | Yes | | |
| 2000 | Strangers with Candy | | Yes | | Episode: "The Blank Page" |
| 2000–2001 | Mad TV | | Yes | | |
| 2000–2002 | Sheep in the Big City | | Yes | | 3 episodes |
| 2005 | Stella | Yes | Yes | Executive | |
| 2007–2011 | Wainy Days | Yes | Yes | Yes | Directed 20 episodes |
| 2008–2016 | Childrens Hospital | Yes | Yes | Executive | Also developer; Directed 12 episodes |
| 2010 | Party Down | Yes | | | Episode: "Not on Your Wife Opening Night" |
| 2013–2015 | Newsreaders | Yes | | Executive | Also creator; Directed segment "Sitcom Family" |
| 2014 | A to Z | Yes | | | Episode: "F Is for Fight, Fight, Fight!" |
| 2015 | Wet Hot American Summer: First Day of Camp | Yes | Yes | Executive | Also creator |
| 2017 | Wet Hot American Summer: Ten Years Later | Yes | Yes | Executive | Also creator |
| 2020 | Medical Police | Yes | Yes | Executive | Also creator; Directed 5 episodes |
| 2023 | Miracle Workers | Yes | | | Directed 2 episodes |
| 2024 | Mr. Throwback | Yes | | Executive | Directed 6 episodes |

Acting roles

| Year | Title | Role | Notes |
|---|---|---|---|
| 1992–1993 | You Wrote It, You Watch It | Various characters | |
| 1993–1995 | The State | Various characters | 27 episodes |
| 1995 | The State's 43rd Annual All-Star Halloween Special | Various characters | TV special |
| 1997 | Apartment 2F | David | Segment: "Finishing the Novel" |
| 1999 | Random Play | Various characters | 3 episodes |
| 2000–2002 | Sheep in the Big City | Stu (voice) | Episode: "Belle of the Baaah" |
| 2003 | Crank Yankers | Al Foster #1 / David | 2 episodes |
| 2003–2022 | Reno 911! | Sam / Sensual Masseuse | 3 episodes |
| 2004 | Cheap Seats without Ron Parker | Brian Lewis | Episode: "High-School Cheerleading" |
| 2005 | Stella | David | 10 episodes |
| 2006 | Entourage | Agent | Episode: "Three's Company" |
| 2007–2011 | Wainy Days | David | 35 episodes |
| 2007–2014 | Superjail! | The Warden (voice) | 35 episodes |
| 2008–2016 | Childrens Hospital | Rabbi Jewy McJewJew / himself / various characters | 20 episodes |
| 2009 | Tim and Eric Awesome Show, Great Job! | Shell Dante | Episode: "Hair" |
| 2012 | New Girl | Male Race Participant | Episode: "Secrets" |
| 2012 | Comedy Bang! Bang! | Gordon Thatchet | Episode: "Elizabeth Banks Wears a Red Dress" |
| 2012–present | Bob's Burgers | Courtney / Grover Fischoeder (voice) | 17 episodes |
| 2013 | Burning Love | Reg Durjmah | Episode: "Dancing!" |
| 2013 | The Greatest Event in Television History | Bell Taint | Episode: "Hart to Hart" |
| 2013 | Key & Peele | Person at People Park #6 | Episode: "#3.13" |
| 2013–2015 | Newsreaders | Jim Davidson | 6 episodes |
| 2014 | Married | David | Episode: "Waffles & Pizza" |
| 2015 | Broad City | Maureen's Ex | Episode: "Coat Check" |
| 2015 | Weird Loners | Howard | 2 episodes |
| 2015 | Last Week Tonight with John Oliver | Maternity | Episode: "Paid Family Leave" |
| 2015 | Wet Hot American Summer: First Day of Camp | Yaron | 6 episodes |
| 2015–2018 | Another Period | Albert Downsy Jr. | 14 episodes |
| 2016 | Younger | Hugh Shirley | 2 episodes |
| 2016–2019 | Drunk History | Thomas Jefferson / Julius Caesar | 2 episodes |
| 2017 | Fresh Off the Boat | Reggie | Episode: "Living with Eddie" |
| 2017 | Wet Hot American Summer: Ten Years Later | Yaron / Bill Clinton | 6 episodes |
| 2018 | Portlandia | Brad | Episode: "Open Relationship" |
| 2018 | Crazy Ex-Girlfriend | Dr. Pratt | Episode: "Nathaniel Is Irrelevant" |
| 2018–2019 | Teachers | Pastor Ted | 3 episodes |
| 2019 | Cake | Dan 2 | Episode: "Inside Out" |
| 2019–2022 | Tuca & Bertie | Various voices | 3 episodes |
| 2019–2020 | Superstore | Dan | 3 episodes |
| 2020 | American Dad! | Mailroom Guy (voice) | Episode: "Businessly Brunette" |
| 2021 | Big City Greens | Ronald Featherman (voice) | Episode: "Winter Greens" |
| 2022 | Murderville | Magic Melvin | Episode: "The Magician's Assistant" |
| 2022 | Tig n' Seek | Jason Mezner | Episode: "A Bucket of Blub" |
| 2022 | The Sex Lives of College Girls | Craig Hennessey | Episode: "Frat Problems" |
| 2023 | History of the World, Part II | Bishop 2 | Episode: "VIII" |
| 2023 | Miracle Workers | HOA Member | Episode: "H.O.A." |
| 2024 | Mr. Throwback | Greg / Bartender | Episode: "Bang Bang" |
| 2025 | The Great North | Alan (voice) | Episode: "Ghouls Rush In Adventure" |
