= Stella (American TV series) =

Comedy Central sketch show

- DVD cover for season one of Stella.
- Created by: Michael Ian Black; Michael Showalter; David Wain
- Starring: Michael Ian Black; Michael Showalter; David Wain
- Opening theme: Instrumental theme by Craig Wedren
- Country of origin: United States
- Original language: English
- No. of seasons: 1
- No. of episodes: 10

Production
- Executive producers: Michael Ian Black; Michael Showalter; David Wain
- Producer: Jerry Kupfer
- Camera setup: Single camera
- Running time: 20–22 minutes (approx.)

Original release
- Network: Comedy Central
- Release: June 28 – August 30, 2005

Stella is an American sketch comedy television series that originally ran from June 28 to August 30, 2005 on Comedy Central. It was created by and stars Michael Ian Black, Michael Showalter, and David Wain, former cast members of MTV's The State (1993). As a comedy troupe, Stella started in 1997 and played to sold out shows across the United States with a cult following. In September, after 10 episodes, Stella's timeslot was succeeded by Mind of Mencia. The DVD was released on September 12, 2006.

== Characters ==
=== Main ===
==== The "Guys" ====
- Michael Ian Black as Michael Ian Black
- Michael Showalter as Michael Showalter
- David Wain as David Wain

==== The Girls Downstairs ====
- Andrea Rosen as Jennifer. In real life, Rosen is Showalter's former roommate.
- Samantha Buck as Amy
- Heidi Neurauter as Stacy

In the pilot only, the third roommate was played by Rashida Jones.

=== Recurring ===
- Justin Lord as Co-Op Board President, Company CEO, Don Robinson, and Justin Lord

== Format ==
Stella is an adaptation of the Stella comedy troupe's stage show and short films. The series centers on Michael, Michael, and David, three childlike men who consistently wear suits, live together in a New York apartment, and seemingly have no employment. The show blends sketch comedy with a sitcom format, featuring a central plot for each episode along with recurring characters, but it disregards continuity and often embraces surreal elements.

The trio had made 28 short films between 1998 and 2002, which were shown as part of the live show. The shorts cover various topics such as searching for Santa, mustache growing, pizza eating, and other absurd situations. The group cleaned up much of its material for the show, much of which had been often derived from taboo or adult topics like necrophilia and dildos.

The show employs absurdist humor. Notable guest stars include Paul Rudd, Rashida Jones, Sam Rockwell, Topher Grace, Tim Blake Nelson, Alan Ruck, Janeane Garofalo, Elizabeth Banks, and Edward Norton.

== Episodes ==
No.	Title	Original release date	Prod. code
1	"Pilot"	June 28, 2005	101
The guys are kicked out of their apartment after finally pushing their landlord too far.
2	"Campaign"	July 5, 2005	102
When Michael Ian Black decides to run for president of the resident's board, David is left on the outs doing menial internship work.
3	"Office Party"	July 12, 2005	105
The guys get invited to one of their neighbors' office party and run afoul of a couple of stereotypical office jerks. They plot their revenge at the next company picnic.
4	"Coffee Shop"	July 19, 2005	103
When the girls downstairs have a fight, the guys tell them the story of the time their friendship was almost destroyed by their competing coffee shop jobs.
5	"Paper Route"	July 26, 2005	104
After running over the paperboy, Kevin O'Malley, the guys take over his paper route, but get discouraged after getting beaten up by bullies. They set out to teach the bullies about the power of friendship.
6	"Meeting Girls"	August 2, 2005	107
The guys dance in a bar and become popular. While they are there, Michael Ian Black and Michael Showalter get dates and David does not. Problems ensue, and soon, Michael and Michael move out, and David is forced to replace them with new roommates as they begin their lives with their new significant others. David's new roommate Jeremy in this episode is played by Josh Charles, Michael Ian Black's girlfriend Tamara is played by Elizabeth Banks, and a scene from this episode was filmed at Alfred Lerner Hall.
7	"Camping"	August 9, 2005	106
Tired of working, the guys take a vacation to the forest, where they quickly get lost.
8	"Novel"	August 16, 2005	108
Inspired by famous author Jane Burroughs (who is played by Janeane Garofalo), the trio tries their hand at writing. They show their manuscript to Jane, who steals it, with the intention of publishing it under her own name.
9	"Vegetables"	August 23, 2005	109
The guys decide to grow their own vegetables on their apartment floor to save money.
10	"Amusement Park"	August 30, 2005	110
The guys are excited to go on a trip to the amusement park to alleviate their irritation with each other, but the trip is ruined by rainy weather. The girls downstairs recommend visiting a psychiatrist, who commits them after they have a fight in his office.
