= Come to Papa =

Come to Papa may refer to:

- Come to Papa (album), a 2000 album by Carl Weathersby
- Come to Papa (TV series), a 2004 American sitcom
- Come to Papa (podcast), a comedy podcast co-hosted by Tom Papa and Paul C. Morrissey
- "Come to Papa", a track from Toy Story 3 (soundtrack)
