= Funtastic Quiz =

2021 interactive quiz show

- Show poster
- Genre: Game show
- Created by: Flipkart Video
- Presented by: Manish Paul
- Country of origin: India
- Original language: Hindi
- No. of seasons: 1

Original release
- Release: 6 October 2021

Funtastic Quiz is an Indian interactive quiz show hosted by film actor and television personality Manish Paul that premiered on 6 October 2021 on the Flipkart app. It is an original series that airs on the Walmart-owned streaming platform Flipkart Video and features trivia questions from multiple categories, ranging from Bollywood to History.

== Format ==
Funtastic Quiz transfers viewers to a quizzing world where one can improve and test their knowledge. It is a timed quiz that features four categories and a total of 5 attempts for all the questions. Each user is 10 seconds to answer the questions and five attempts for every category. These questions will be based on bollywood, cricket, and current affairs. The show is being hosted by Manish Paul alongside other influencers from Flipkart Video section.

== Cast ==
- Manish Paul
