= Seth Herzog =

American comedian

- Herzog in 2026
- Born: Seth G. Herzog; November 4, 1970 (age 56); Englewood, New Jersey U.S.
- Other name: The Zog
- Spouse: Hitha Prabhakar Herzog

Comedy career
- Years active: 2001-present
- Genres: Stand-up, sketch
- Website: sethherzog.biz

Seth G. Herzog (aka The Zog) is an American comedian. Herzog is active in New York City performing comedy and is a warm-up comedian for Late Night with Jimmy Fallon. He was the subject of the short film Zog's Place. He has also had small roles in such films as Safe Men, The Ten and The Baxter. Herzog has acted in numerous commercials, and on such T.V. shows as Late Night with Conan O'Brien, Chappelle's Show, and VH1's Best Week Ever.

== Early life and education ==
Herzog was born in Englewood, New Jersey, and lived in nearby Tenafly until the age of four. He grew up in Princeton, New Jersey.

In 1988, Herzog graduated from Princeton High School in New Jersey. In 1992, he graduated from Rhodes College in Memphis, Tennessee with a degree in history and theater.

== Career ==
In the New York comedy scene, Herzog has performed in such venues as Chetty Red's, Rififi, and the Red Room. Since 2004, Herzog has hosted a weekly comedy show every Tuesday night called "Sweet" that began a long-time residency at the Lower East Side bar, The Slipper Room, then moving to other downtown venues. A regular feature of the show is a called "What's On My Mom's Mind," during which he interviews his mother, Kera Greene.

From 2004 to 2013, Herzog appeared on the VH-1 show Best Week Ever.

In 2005, Herzog introduced movies on IFC.

In 2008, Herzog contributed his voice to the animated comedy webseries Amazing the Lion hosted by the Independent Comedy Network.

Herzog is perhaps best known for his "Wonder Woman" routine, during which he wears a Wonder Woman costume and does a dance while lip-synching to the Wonder Woman theme song.

In April 2008, Herzog toured Iraq performing for the U.S. troops.

In 2013 and 2014, Herzog co-hosted Duck Quacks Don't Echo on the National Geographic channel with Michael Ian Black and Tom Papa.

Later in 2014, he was the overdub and localized version host of Science of Stupid.

Since 2009, Herzog has been the warm-up comic for and a cast member on The Tonight Show Starring Jimmy Fallon having previously done the same for Late Night with Jimmy Fallon. He has appeared in sketches on both shows.

== Personal life ==
In 2014, Herzog married journalist and writer Hitha Herzog (née Prabhakar).

== Honors and awards ==
- 2007: Heeb Magazine, Heeb 100

== Selected filmography ==
- 2006: Kappa Mikey TV series (1 episode: voice in "Big Trouble in Little Tokyo")
- 2007: The Ten as Naked Guy
- 2008: Role Models as Bell-Ringing Winged Creature
- 2008: Mayne Street TV series (2 episodes: Man on Toilet in "Poker", Satellite Tech in "New Years"
- 2009: The Winning Season as Mascot
- 2009: Lost Cities: Jersey City TV movie as self
- 2010: 30 Rock TV series (1 episode: Swingles Man in "Gentleman's Intermission"
- 2011: Puppy Love short as Dad
- 2011: Zog's Place as L.L.
- 2011: Late Night with Jimmy Fallon TV series (6 episodes)
- 2014: Duck Quacks Don't Echo, TV series as Panelist
- 2014: Science of Stupid, U.S. dub edition TV series as Host
- 2014: They Came Together as Chez Brasserie Piano Player
- 2014: The Return of Saturn short
- 2014-2018: The Tonight Show Starring Jimmy Fallon TV series (8 episodes)
- 2015: Mismanagement TV series (1 episode: Vinny in "Pilot")
- 2017: Inside You as Harold
- 2018: The Special Without Brett Davis TV series (1 episode: "Search For Mr. Jokes"
- 2018: Boy Band as Lance; also producer
- 2019: Broad City TV series (1 episode: Craig in "Shenanigans")
- 2019: Addi short
- 2019: Gander TV series as Disaster Mattress Man 2
