= Louden Swain =

American indie rock band

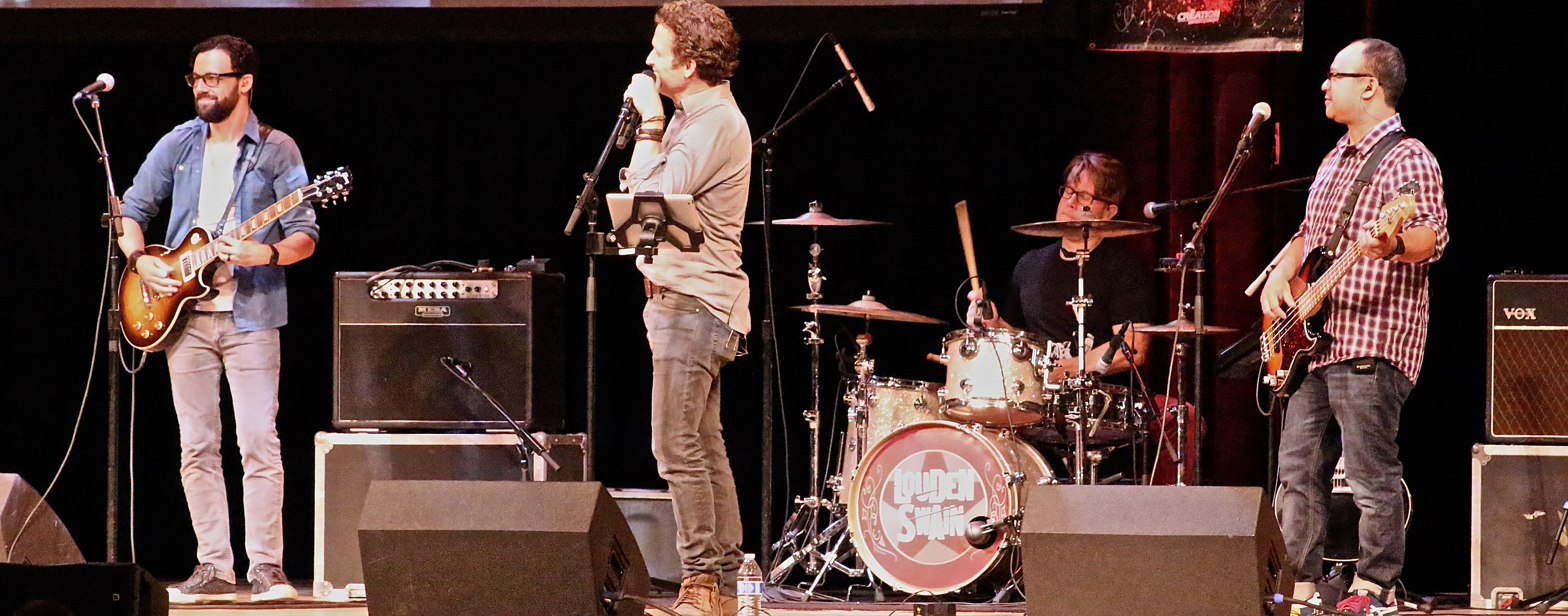
- Louden Swain at Arcana 45 (2015)

Background information
- Genres: Indie Rock
- Years active: 1997-Present
- Members: Rob Benedict; Billy Moran; Michael Borja; Stephen Norton
- Website: https://www.loudenswain.com/

Louden Swain is an American indie rock band from Los Angeles. The band was formed in 1997 when lead singer and guitarist Rob Benedict and bassist Michael Borja, met drummer Stephen Norton through a mutual friend at a party in Los Angeles. Guitarist Billy Moran later joined the band in 2006, after his previous band disbanded. The band was named after the main character in the 1985 film Vision Quest.

Louden Swain has released eleven albums, the first being Able-Legged Heroes in 2001, followed by Overachiever, Suit and Tie, A Brand New Hurt, Eskimo, and Sky Alive. Their seventh album, entitled No Time Like the Present, was released on January 13, 2017, and their eighth album, and first live album, Saturday Night Special in August 2017. Their ninth album Splitting the Seams was released in October 2018. During 2021, due to the COVID-19 pandemic, their album process was delayed and the band released several singles. The band then released two albums in 2022, their tenth album Foolish released in April and their eleventh, and latest, album Feelings and Such in November.

The band acts as the house band, and performs concerts on Saturday nights, for the Supernatural conventions. These conventions are held by Creation Entertainment throughout the year in the United States and Canada. Benedict was first invited to Supernatural conventions as an actor, since his appearance in the show starting 2009. During conventions, Louden Swain is often accompanied by other Supernatural actors, such as Richard Speight Jr., as heard on their live album Saturday Night Special.

Three Louden Swain songs were featured in Supernatural and the band appeared in an episode of the spin-off series The Winchesters. All the band members also appear in Kings of Con, a comedy series created by Benedict and Speight about Supernatural conventions, as well as performing in the after show Kings of Conversation.

They have also performed internationally in the UK, Italy, and Australia. When they aren't performing on the convention circuit the band will also play shows throughout the US (Texas, Tennessee, and Georgia) or shows in their hometown of Los Angeles.

== Discography ==
- Able-Legged Heroes (2001)
- Overachiever (2003)
- Suit and Tie (2006)
- A Brand New Hurt (2009)
- Eskimo (2011)
- Sky Alive (2014)
- No Time Like the Present (2017)
- Saturday Night Special (live) (2017)
- Splitting the Seams (2018)
- Foolish (2021)
- Feelings and Such (2022)

=== Singles ===
Singles not released as part of a main album

- Telephone Tree (2004) - as part of This One's for the Fellows Compilation
- Help You (2011) - as part of A Little Help Soundtrack
- Here Come the Snakes (2018 Remix) (2019)
- Hard Times Come Again No More (feat. Jericho) (2023) - as part of The Winchesters Soundtrack
