= Threshold (TV series) =

American science fiction drama television series

- Genre: Science fiction Drama
- Created by: Bragi F. Schut
- Starring: Carla Gugino; Brian Van Holt; Brent Spiner; Rob Benedict; Peter Dinklage; Charles S. Dutton
- Composer: Pieter A. Schlosser
- Countries of origin: United States; United Kingdom
- Original language: English
- No. of seasons: 1
- No. of episodes: 13 (4 unaired in the United States)

Production
- Executive producers: Brannon Braga; David S. Goyer; David Heyman; Bragi F. Schut
- Producers: André Bormanis; Karen Moore; David Livingston; Carla Gugino
- Running time: 42 minutes
- Production companies: Braga Productions; Heyday Films; Phantom Four Films; Paramount Network Television

Original release
- Network: CBS (2005); Sky1 (2006)
- Release: September 16 – November 22, 2005

Threshold is a science fiction drama television series that ran on CBS from September 16 to November 22, 2005. Produced by Brannon Braga, David S. Goyer and David Heyman, the series focuses on a secret government project investigating the first contact with an extraterrestrial species.

The series was first shown on Friday nights, but was moved to Tuesday in an effort to boost ratings. This plan backfired, with the show registering a sharp drop in its ratings on its first Tuesday night showing on November 22, 2005, and CBS canceled the series on November 23, 2005, leaving four episodes left unaired.

The last four episodes were aired on Sky1, a channel in the United Kingdom owned by Sky, who co-produced the series with CBS. The entire series was released on DVD on August 22, 2006.

== Overview ==
The series stars Carla Gugino as Dr. Molly Caffrey, a high-level government crisis management consultant from the Blackwood Institute whose job is to create contingency plans for use in emergencies ranging from natural disasters to nuclear war. In order to have "all bases covered", one of her plans, code-named Threshold, is developed for dealing with the unlikely eventuality of first contact with aliens. One night, the crew of a U.S. naval vessel encounters a UFO. Many crew members subsequently die horribly, but some escape. After the ship is discovered with dead crew members and a videotape of the encounter, the Threshold protocol is activated.

Caffrey's Threshold plan calls for the formation of a secret government task force known as the Red Team. As a result, several top scientists are seconded: Dr. Nigel Fenway (Brent Spiner), an individualistic NASA-employed microbiologist; Lucas Pegg (Rob Benedict), a somewhat unsure-of-himself aerospace engineer on the eve of his marriage, and Arthur Ramsey (Peter Dinklage), a mathematics and linguistics genius with a penchant for unpredictability, alcohol and women. Caffrey's government liaison is Deputy National Security Advisor J.T. Baylock (Charles S. Dutton), while freelance paramilitary operative Sean Cavennaugh (Brian Van Holt) serves as the "muscle" of the group (and apparent potential love interest for Caffrey). Daphne Larson (Catherine Bell) was added to the team in the episode "Outbreak". Caffrey's team works under absolute secrecy, their activities not even known to the vice-president, or the Joint Chiefs of Staff.

Threshold learns that the aliens are attempting to rewrite the DNA of the human race using, in part, an audio signal that somehow alters some people's body chemistry in such a way that they become alien themselves. Central to all this is a fractal triskelion pattern that keeps appearing – in electronic signals, blood, and even the pattern made by city lights. Its significance has yet to be revealed, though Arthur Ramsey interpreted it as representing Triple-stranded DNA of extraterrestrial origin.

The episodes focus on Caffrey and her team as they learn more about the signal, the fractal pattern, and the aliens. Often, their work requires them to impersonate different U.S. Government agencies. Compounding the situation, Caffrey, Cavennaugh and Pegg were exposed to a small part of the signal, which while not (as yet) infecting them, has nonetheless altered their brains, causing the trio to have bizarre, linked dreams, and also receive messages from the aliens with Caffrey, in particular, experiencing frightening, often violent hallucinations. Individuals experiencing these visions have been referred to as "dreamers" by the Threshold Red Team.

An ongoing subplot of the series is the emotional impact Threshold has on Caffrey herself, as she is required to make life-and-death decisions on an almost daily basis. The impact on other members of her team is also explored.

=== Opening monologue ===
My name is Molly Caffrey, and I work for the Federal Government. I deal in worst-case scenarios, the unthinkable. On September 16th, 2005, the unthinkable happened. An extraterrestrial object appeared off the bow of a naval freighter. The entire crew was exposed to a high frequency signal. Some died instantly. Others began to change. They are now stronger, more resilient. They dream of alien landscapes. And they are driven by the impulse to infect others. Several of the crewmen are now loose in the United States. They will strike anytime, anyplace, anyone. Their goal: to turn us into them. But I have a plan to stop them. That plan is called "Threshold".

The monologue was used in episodes 1–9, but was dropped for the remaining episodes. It also was not used for any of the episodes in the DVD version.

== Cast ==
=== Main ===
- Carla Gugino as Dr. Molly Anne Caffrey
- Charles S. Dutton as J.T. Baylock
- Brent Spiner as Dr. Nigel Fenway
- Rob Benedict as Lucas Pegg
- Brian Van Holt as Sean Cavennaugh
- Peter Dinklage as Arthur Ramsey

Prior to Threshold's cancellation Brannon Braga announced that Catherine Bell would be joining the series, as would another actress, Jacqueline Kim, who would appear as Lucas's wife Rachel. In the unaired episode "Outbreak", Bell guest stars as Dr. Daphne Larson, a botanist brought in to examine the mutated vegetables from "Revelations". She is added as a new member to the Red Team, but except for being referenced by name in "Vigilante", made no further appearances on the series before it ended.

=== Guest stars ===
- Dr. Daphne Larson (Catherine Bell): Botanist and leading expert in genetic engineering. Brought into the Threshold team after it was confirmed that people were getting infected after eating GM food created by Sonntag. (in "Outbreak")
- Dr. Julian Sloan (Jeffrey Donovan): Due to a rare genetic disorder he was only half transformed into an infectee. Sloan is unique in the fact he can physically see those altered by the signal. (in "Vigilante")
- Gunneson (William Mapother): A crew member of the U.S. Navy cargo freighter Big Horn who becomes affected by the signal. (in "Trees Made of Glass, Parts 1 and 2")

== Episodes ==
Episodes from "The Crossing" onwards saw their first broadcast on Sky1 in the UK.

No.	Title	Directed by	Written by	Original release date	Prod. code	Viewers (millions)
1	"Trees Made of Glass: Part 1"	David S. Goyer	Bragi F. Schut	September 16, 2005	101	8.6
Dr. Caffrey and her team must investigate a chilling situation on the U.S. Navy cargo freighter Big Horn, after crew members are killed by an audio signal from a mysterious craft that lands in the Atlantic Ocean.
2	"Trees Made of Glass: Part 2"	Peter Hyams	Brannon Braga & David S. Goyer	September 16, 2005	102	8.6
Caffrey and her team realize that the Big Horn crew might not have all perished, and in order to contain the situation they must find the crew and figure out what has affected them before it spreads to the rest of the population.
3	"Blood of the Children"	Bill Eagles	Anne McGrail	September 23, 2005	103	8.3
When the facilities manager of a military school goes on a rampage at a fast-food restaurant and is later found killed, Molly and Cavennaugh look to the military academy. After they observe some of the students acting strangely, Molly and her team discover that the facilities manager and some of the children have been exposed to the Big Horn signal.
4	"The Burning"	John Showalter	Brannon Braga & Dan O'Shannon	September 30, 2005	104	8.2
A psychiatric patient has escaped from a hospital in Ohio and is suspected of killing one of the guards and taking an underwear-clad female hostage. When Caffrey and the Red Team discover that the patient has had strange dreams that drove him to his escape — the same dreams Caffrey, Cavennaugh and Pegg had after they listened to the Big Horn signal — they realize this is not an ordinary missing-persons case.
5	"Shock"	Tim Matheson	André Bormanis	October 7, 2005	106	8.1
Caffrey and the Red Team head to Baltimore after one of the fugitive Big Horn crewmembers murders a policeman. After the fugitive escapes from the custody of Homeland Security agents, Pegg, Fenway and Ramsey discover that the fugitive may have access to technology that can emit the Big Horn signal to a large quantity of the population.
6	"Pulse"	Bill L. Norton	Mike Sussman	October 14, 2005	105	7.4
After it's discovered that the signal from the Big Horn was used in a music mix at a Miami rave, Molly and the team head to Florida to investigate whether if any of the partygoers have been converted and to track down the rave's D.J., who has gone missing after exhibiting bizarre behavior.
7	"The Order"	Norberto Barba	Anne McGrail	October 21, 2005	107	8.1
Dr. Caffrey has to deal with meddling from a senator who now insists on being included in the inner workings of the project. Meanwhile, residents of a small Rhode Island town call into a local radio station and complain that they're having dreams of "trees made of glass."
8	"Revelations"	Thomas J. Wright	Amy Berg & Andrew Colville	November 4, 2005	108	6.5
Caffrey and Cavennaugh investigate a Big Horn crewmember's hometown, where they encounter a local preacher who is captivating his parishioners with his visions of a "sea of glass" and an impending apocalypse. Meanwhile, when it is suspected that crystals formed on washed-up wreckage of the Big Horn are capable of spreading infection, Fenway, Pegg and Ramsey search the ocean floor to find the remaining pieces of the ship.
9	"Progeny"	David Jackson	Barbara Nance	November 22, 2005	109	n/a
Three affluent women within a five-mile radius exhibit bizarre behavior. When it's confirmed that they've all been infected — Caffrey and the Red Team discover the disturbing common link between the three and must find the source.
10	"The Crossing"	Paul Shapiro	Bragi F. Schut	January 11, 2006 (Sky1)	110	n/a
Caffrey and Baylock realize the Threshold detainees must be moved immediately to a more secure facility in West Virginia when a prisoner infects a security guard, breaks the infected prisoners out of their cells, and is recaptured. During the move, the convoy of prisoners is ambushed and almost lost. The team learns Manning is training a terrorist cell, and Lucas Pegg is confined to a hospital.
11	"Outbreak"	Felix Alcalá	Dan O'Shannon	January 18, 2006 (Sky1)	111	n/a
Lucas Pegg is infected with the alien DNA from something he ate. The infectees have harvested crops with the alien DNA. Caffrey must find a way to stop what could be nearly 200 new infectees. Also, one of the aliens approaches her with an interesting revelation.
12	"Vigilante"	John Showalter	Mike Sussman	January 25, 2006 (Sky1)	112	n/a
When a number of infectees and seemingly innocent people are killed, it becomes apparent that someone is going after people affected by the alien signal, and is locating them via their heightened brain waves. How is the killer linked to Big Horn crewman Manning, and does his method of finding his victims mean that Molly, Cavennaugh or Lucas could be next on his list?
13	"Alienville"	Oz Scott	Anne McGrail	February 1, 2006 (Sky1)	113	n/a
Caffrey and Cavennaugh go out to a town called Allenville in search of a Doctor who they think is infected and find more than they were looking for. Meanwhile things at Threshold get heated with the pregnancy of the infected woman coming to an end.

== Cancellation ==
According to writer Brannon Braga on the 2006 DVD release, word that production of the series was being terminated was received midway through shooting of the episode "Alienville". The ending of the episode was changed to show Molly having a dream conversation with an alien-human baby (who had been born in the episode, but appeared in the dream as a nine-year-old boy). The boy tells Molly that her Threshold plan will eventually succeed in stopping the alien invasion (the age of the boy implies it will happen within nine years), but that she would herself "not be there" (i.e. die) before this happens.

When the show was moved to Tuesday, it was shown at the same time as the popular show Law & Order: Special Victims Unit and one week had to also compete with the American Music Awards as well. This resulted in a ratings drop, which caused the show to be canceled.

Producer David S. Goyer give some insight about the show's cancellation and was what planned for the subsequent seasons:

“The problem with "Threshold" was just, unfortunately, I think CBS was never that comfortable with it being a serialized show. And it was always intended to be a serialized show. Once we got going into the series, they wanted episodes to be more closed ended. They have had a lot of success with that, and we hadn’t really designed it for that, so it felt like we were stalling. I think the audience unfortunately sensed that as well. In terms of the overall arc of the show, we had always intended or planned to have, it was three stages. It was “Threshold,” “Foothold,” “Stranglehold.” Meaning “Threshold” is contact, “Foothold” is the aliens get a foothold, and “Stranglehold” is the aliens actually overthrow the indigenous population and become the overlords. And we were actually planning on changing the title of the show, based on that plan. So it goes from contact, to they’re here, to now we are fighting a resistance battle. But obviously we never got that far.

== Show mythology ==
=== The infection ===
The main threat of the series was sent to Earth by an Alien probe that infected the crew of the USNS Big Horn. The infection can be spread in a multitude of ways from contact with bodily fluids to listening to certain audio samples. Both humans and animals are susceptible to infection and it is implied through the show the aliens wish to xenoform the whole world to suit their needs. Even plants can be genetically modified to spread the alien infection. Dr. Fenway discovered that pre-pubescent humans and animals are immune to the infection, apparently due to their stronger immune systems: as soon as humans are capable of reproducing, the alien infection can reproduce in them.

In the series, four variants were discovered to occur in humans who were exposed to the signal including:

Infectee
Humans who were exposed to the infection and have been converted into "aliens". They appear like ordinary people but their DNA structure has been altered to a triple helix form. They are stronger, faster and smarter than humans but have no humanity, emotions or compassion. To ordinary humans they would appear to be suffering from extreme sociopathy.
Mutation
Individuals who were exposed to the infection but whose bodies reacted badly to the infection. Rather than being converted they are grotesquely and fatally deformed by the infection in what is thought to be the immune system's failed attempt to combat the disease. Death is normally quick, but mutation survivors will impulsively attempt to kill themselves and others.
Dreamers
Humans who have had low-level exposure to the infection and as a result are only slightly altered. They become attuned to the alien consciousness and are able to listen in on the alien intelligence.
Hybrids
A one in a million freak occurrence where an individual is only half transformed by the alien signal due to inherent genetic instability. In the case of Dr. Julian Slone his defective gene for hypertrophic cardiomyopathy was activated by his infection and stopped the conversion process halfway through. Hybrids are as strong and durable as the aliens but retain their humanity. One unique feature of a hybrid is their ability to perceive those who have been exposed to the infection by a blue-green aura that surrounds the exposed individual. Despite this, they lack the ability to distinguish between someone with minimal exposure or a full-blown infectee.

=== The alien plan ===
In Episode 11, which was unaired in the US, one of the hybrids reveals that the aliens plan to save humankind by changing their DNA and the surface of the earth. This is because millennia ago, far out in space, two neutron stars collided, creating a gamma ray burst - the radiation of which is heading for Earth and will, when it arrives in six years, end all life on the surface of the planet. Because the revelation came from a hybrid, this explanation is considered suspect and that the hybrid's sole intention is to slow the Threshold program. NASA sends a Top Secret letter to Caffrey confirming the alien allegation about the burst. The text of that letter is below:

Dear Dr. Molly Anne Cafrey

In reply to your request for information at the following coordinates

Eight hours right ascension, thirty four degrees south declination

It has been confirmed that approximately 400,000 years ago two neutron stars collided at these coordinates, and the cosmic radiation that resulted from this collision is expected to affect the Earth in approximately six years.

Cosmic radiation is a collection of many types of radiation from many different types of sources. When people speak simply of "cosmic radiation" they are usually referring specifically to the cosmic microwave background radiation. This consists of very, very low energy photons [energy of about 2.75 Kelvin] whose spectrum is peaked in the microwave region and which are remnants from the time when the Universe was only about 200,000 years old. There are also very old remnant neutrinos in the cosmic radiations.

When these particles make it to earth, it will interact with our atmosphere. Our atmosphere is able to reflect small amounts of these particles and act as a "radiation shield". The amount of particles that will enter our atmosphere in six years as a result of this collision will most likely be more than our atmosphere will be able to protect us from. The Earth will be completely destroyed and all human life will be extinguished.

We thank you for your concern and interest and hope this information has been of help to you.

=== Planned storylines ===
A featurette included on the August 2006 DVD release of the series confirmed a number of reported and rumored storylines that were planned had the series survived:

- The series had a three-year arc that would have seen the series change its title each year, from Threshold to Foothold, referring to the next level of Molly Caffrey's plan for a mass alien invasion, and finally to Stranglehold in which a well-established alien empire has appeared on Earth.
- In the episode "Vigilante", it is revealed that Ramsey has a drug and alcohol problem. This would have progressed causing Ramsey to "hit bottom" at one point. Meanwhile, it would be discovered that the abnormality in Ramsey's brain that caused his short stature actually made him immune to the alien infection.
- The Threshold team would learn that 80 more probe ships were headed to Earth.
- The aliens had been sending probes to Earth every 160 years or so, but these probes failed to start widespread infection due to the lack of travel and technology on the planet at the time. The episode "The Burning" hints at this with a buried 320-year-old probe. The episode "Outbreak" continued this arc by having Lucas encounter a 19th-century man in a dream who says he fought and defeated the aliens.

The episodes that were not aired by CBS also included several plot elements that would probably have been explored had the series continued: for example, Dr. Sloan, the so-called "Vigilante" introduced in the episode of the same name, whose self-appointed mission is to kill infectees (the episode also indicates a romantic attraction between him and Caffrey); the real nature of the gamma ray burst headed for Earth indicated in "The Crossing"; the effect of Threshold on Lucas Peggs' marriage; Cavennaugh's search for his brother (who becomes infected and provides the aliens with information about Threshold); the development of an alien infectee culture (who refer to themselves as "improved" humans) and their perception that the US government is persecuting them (an element introduced in the final episode, "Alienville"); and the aftermath of Caffrey's orders to increase Threshold's powers in "Outbreak".

== Broadcast history ==
=== International broadcasters ===
- Australia: Network Ten Aired On Network Ten on December 18, 2005, moved to late Wednesday nights, later moved to Ten HD. Showed at 10:30 pm Tuesdays, the channels aired all 13 episodes. Sci Fi Channel (Australia) began airing episodes on Sunday afternoons on February 21, 2010.
- Arab World: MBC Action, beginning on August 11, 2007.
- Belgium: VT4, beginning on January 3, 2010. Only first 9 episodes aired.
- Bosnia and Herzegovina: FTV, beginning on January 3, 2009,
- Brazil: AXN, beginning on August 28, 2006, occupying a Lost time slot between seasons 2 and 3.
- Canada: Space
- Croatia: Nova TV, beginning January 3, 2008
- Chile: Red TV
- Denmark: TV 2
- Finland: Nelonen
- France: M6
- Germany: ProSieben, beginning March 3, 2008, under the title Nemesis: Der Angriff - including all 13 episodes.
- Greece: Star Channel
- Hungary: TV2
- Iceland: SkjárEinn
- Ireland: Sky1
- Israel: Channel 1
- Italy: Rai Due
- Japan: Sci Fi Channel
- Kosovo: RTV 21
- Latin America: AXN, beginning on August 28, 2006, occupying a Lost time slot between seasons 2 and 3.
- Macedonia: Sitel
- Malaysia: NTV7
- Mexico: AXN, beginning on August 28, 2006, occupying a Lost time slot between seasons 2 and 3.
- Netherlands: Veronica, beginning January 7, 2008. Plays 2 episodes every Monday.
- New Zealand: TV3, beginning November 30, 2007.
- Norway: TV2
- Philippines: RPN 9 / C/S 9
- Poland: TV4, Polsat, AXN
- Portugal: MOV beginning 22 January 2013.
- Quebec: Ztélé, French version beginning on January 1, 2007, under the title Threshold: premier contact.
- Romania: PrimaTV
- Russia: TV3
- Serbia: RTS1
- Slovakia: TV JOJ
- Spain: Telecinco
- Sweden: TV4 Plus
- Thailand: True Series
- Turkey: Digiturk(Dizimax)
- United Kingdom: Sky1 (repeated on Sky2, Sky3, & Pick), Sci Fi Channel
- United States: CBS, (repeated on Universal HD)

=== Web broadcasting ===
Threshold was the first CBS television series to utilize "streaming video" to re-air new episodes after the original airdate. Each new episode was posted on the CBS website five days after its original airdate and remained accessible there for three days. Nancy Tellem, president of the CBS Paramount Network Television Entertainment Group, stated that "the goal here is to recruit new viewers to Threshold, help existing viewers catch up if they've missed some episodes and drive more traffic to CBS.com." Survivor and The Amazing Race both utilized a similar method for post-show interviews and discussions. The following television season (2006–07) CBS incorporated this concept into a streaming video area on their website called Innertube. Additionally, "Behind the scenes" video clips for Threshold were available on the site.

== Reception ==
The show received generally favorable reviews from critics, and has a rating of 64/100 on metacritic.com based on 26 reviews. The best came from USA Today, who say "Convincingly smart, realistically unsettled and sexy as all get-out, Gugino radiates so much TV star power, it just might be visible from outer space." On the other end, the Philadelphia Inquirer says "There's nothing inviting about the ponderous Threshold. Portentous music plays. Scared smart guys, rounded up by the government to figure out what's really happening, say smart-guy stupid stuff."
