= 30 Miles from Nowhere =

- Directed by: Caitlin Koller
- Written by: Seana Kofoed
- Story by: Seana Kofoed
- Produced by: Kelly Demaret; Seana Kofoed; Lauren M.
- Starring: Carrie Preston; Rob Benedict; Cathy Shim; Agung Bagus; Seana Kofoed; William Smillie; Postell Pringle; Brigundi Baker; Tim Decker; Reggie Baker; Marielle Scott; Jimmy Neal; Andrew Rothenberg; Rusty Schwimmer
- Cinematography: Ben McBurnett
- Edited by: John Quinn
- Music by: Rene G. Boscio
- Production company: Film Camp Productions
- Distributed by: 4Digital Media
- Release date: 24 November 2018 (Monster Fest)
- Running time: 84 minutes
- Country: United States
- Language: English

30 Miles from Nowhere is a 2018 American horror film directed by Caitlin Koller and starring Carrie Preston, Rob Benedict, Agung Bagus, Birgundi Baker, Jimmy Neal, and Andrew Rothenberg.

== Plot ==
The film follows five ex-college buddies who return to the summer home of their youth for their scientist friend's funeral. But mourning turns to terror when they realize their reunion is not at all what it seems.

== Cast ==
- Carrie Preston as Sylvia
- Rob Benedict as Larry
- Birgundi Baker as Delilah
- Cathy Shim as Bess
- Seana Kofoed as Elaine
- William Smillie as Paul
- Postell Pringle as Jack
- Marielle Scott as Amber
- Agung Bagus as Jack brother
- Andrew Rothenberg as Max
- Rusty Schwimmer as Officer Marsh
- Tim Decker as Brad
- Jimmy Neal as Max brother
- Roslyn Alexander as Norma
- Reggie Baker as Officer Riley
- Robert Breuler as Father Galvin

== Reception ==
The film has an 80% approval rating on Rotten Tomatoes based on 10 reviews, with an average score of 6.1/10.
