= Rob Benedict =

American actor (born 1970)

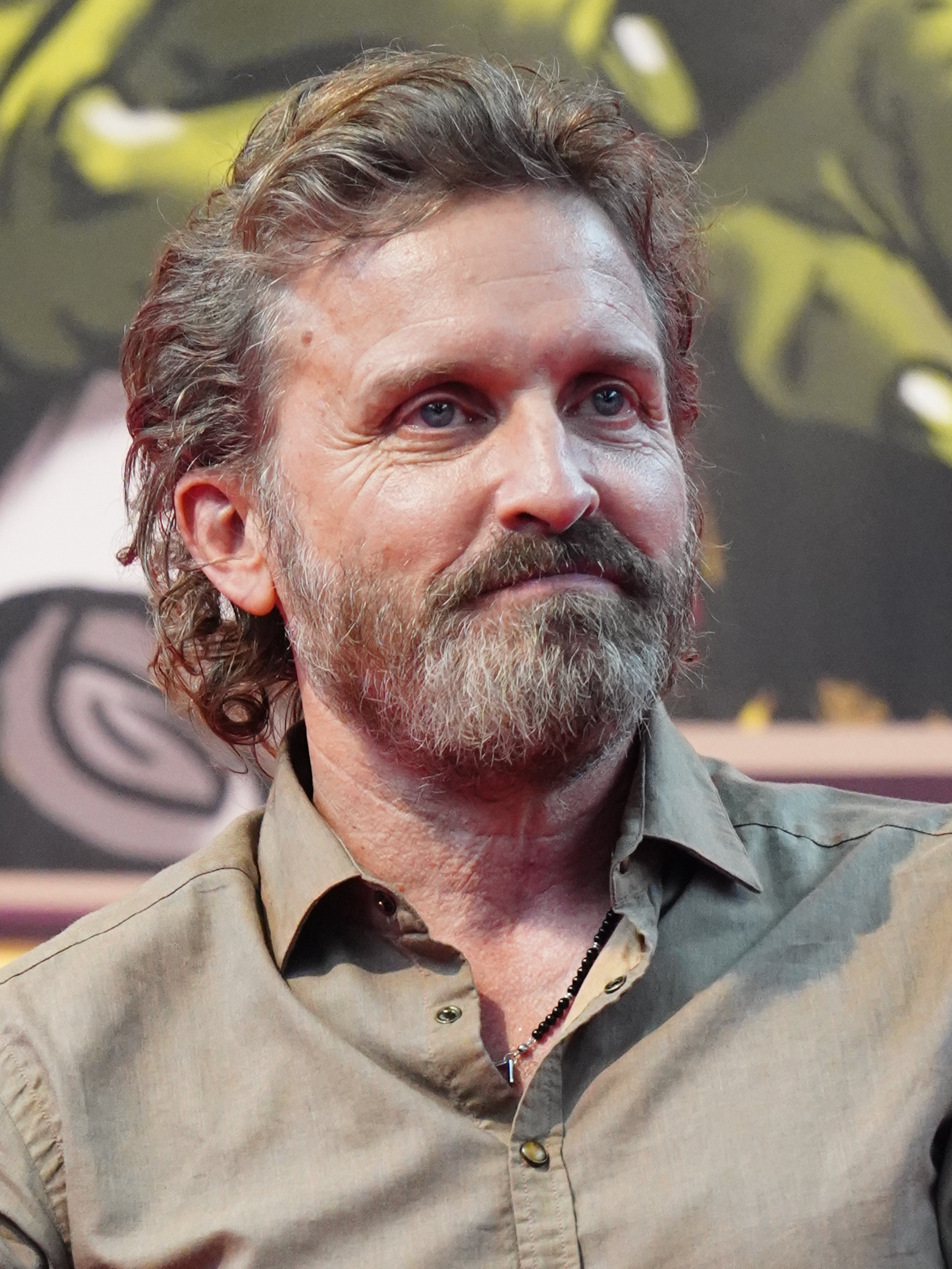
- Benedict at the 2026 Comic Con Brussels
- Born: Robert Patrick Benedict; September 21, 1970 (age 56); Columbia, Missouri, U.S.
- Occupations: Actor; writer; musician
- Years active: 1995–present
- Spouse: Mollie Benedict (m. 1995; div. 2019)
- Partner: Ruth Connell
- Children: 3
- Relatives: Amy Benedict (sister)

Rob Benedict (born September 21, 1970) is an American actor, writer and musician. His near 30-year career includes more than 90 television and movie credits. He is best known for his work on the television series Supernatural, Threshold, Felicity and the comedy film Waiting.... He is also the lead singer/songwriter of the Los Angeles-based band Louden Swain.

== Early life ==
Benedict was born in Columbia, Missouri. He graduated from Northwestern University with a Bachelor's degree in Performance Studies.

== Career ==
=== Acting ===
In the WB series Felicity he appeared as Felicity Porter's dorm mate, Richard Coad. In CBS's Threshold Benedict played physicist Lucas Pegg, member of a secret government team investigating the first contact with an extraterrestrial species. In seasons 4, 5, 10, 11, 14 and 15 of Supernatural he played a writer, Chuck Shurley, previously thought to be a prophet of the lord but later revealed to be God, who eventually becomes the series main antagonist. On Lucifer, he recurred as baddie Vincent LeMec. Other credits include Sydney Bristow's short CIA partner, Brodien on Alias. Additional early television series credits include Birds of Prey and Come to Papa, with guest appearances on NCIS, CSI, Monk, Medium, Chicago Hope, NYPD Blue, Buffy the Vampire Slayer, Snoops, Burn Notice, and Beverly Hills, 90210. Other Recurring characters include roles in Bosch, NCIS: New Orleans, Masters of Sex, Fox's Touch, Franklin & Bash, the digital series Susanna with Anna Paquin, and he was the irreverent power agent Jeremy Berger in the Starz Original comedy series Head Case. His feature film credits include A Little Help, with Jenna Fischer, State of Play with Russell Crowe. In 2005 he starred as Calvin in the Rob McKittrick cult comedy Waiting... with Ryan Reynolds, and later revised the role in the sequel Still Waiting... Other films include Kicking & Screaming, with Will Ferrell, Group Sex, Say Goodnight with Aaron Paul, Two Days, with Paul Rudd, The First $20 Million Is Always the Hardest, starring Rosario Dawson, and Not Another Teen Movie. In 2018, he had a starring role in the horror film 30 Miles from Nowhere, with Carrie Preston, Clearmind, and Connescence with Kevin Bacon. Benedict has also done some voice acting work, most notably voicing the character Vin, in the video games Jak II and Jak 3. In 2026, Benedict starred as Joseph in Saigon, an eight-part scripted audio drama for iHeartPodcasts based on the 1982 novel Saigon by Anthony Grey, alongside Kelly Marie Tran.

=== Writing and producing ===
He co-wrote and starred in the independent short film Lifetripper, which made its debut at the LA Short Film Festival. He also co-wrote and played Miles Davis-Davidson in the Unauthorized Hangover 2 Documentary, which was featured on the DVD of The Hangover Part II.

In 2013 he wrote, produced and starred in the 30 minute short film The Sidekick, which starred Jordan Peele, Lizzy Caplan, Ike Barinholtz, Ron Livingston and Jason Ritter.

In 2017, he wrote, produced and starred in the 10-episode series Kings of Con with friend and fellow actor Richard Speight Jr. The series first aired on Comic-ConHQ. It is set behind the scenes at fan conventions, based loosely on their real-life experiences at conventions.

He started a podcast on 27 March 2020 along with friend and fellow actor Richard Speight Jr., called ...And my Guest is Richard Speight. It ran for 10 episodes, ending on 5 August 2020. In September 2020, the two started a new podcast called Kings of Con: The Podcast, after their short series by the same name. The two also present a podcast called Supernatural: Then and Now, where they discuss Supernatural.

=== Music ===
Benedict is the frontman and guitar player in the Los Angeles band Louden Swain, which has released eleven albums. He has been featured on the work of other artists, including Jason Manns, and bandmate Billy Moran. He has released a solo album, Leave the Light On.

== Personal life ==
Benedict was married to Mollie Benedict from 1995 to 2019 and together they have two children: Audrey and Calvin. Benedict is in a relationship with his Supernatural co-star, Ruth Connell. They have a daughter, who was born in January 2024.

In October 2013, Benedict suffered a stroke at a Supernatural Convention in Toronto. His co-star and close friend, Richard Speight Jr., noticed his symptoms and rushed him to the hospital. Throughout the following year, Benedict made a miraculous recovery and regained all functions, especially the ability to sing. In 2016, He and Speight Jr. went on to create a t-shirt campaign called 'Getting By With a Little Help' where a portion of the proceeds were donated to the National Stroke Association.

== Filmography ==
=== Film ===
Year	Title	Role
1995	Run a Mile in My Shoes (short)	Unknown
1999	Tequila Body Shots	Ted
1999	Bad City Blues	Tommy
2001	Not Another Teen Movie	Preston Wasserstein
2002	The First $20 Million Is Always the Hardest	Willy
2002	The Naked Run (short)	Lancer Higgins
2002	American Pi(short)	Max
2003	Two Days	Scott
2003	My Dinner With Jimi	Donovan
2005	Overachievers	Ben Martan
2005	Kicking & Screaming	Beantown Employees
2005	Waiting...	Calvin
2007	Sex and Death 101	Bow-Tie Bob
2008	Say Goodnight	Leroy
2009	Still Waiting...	Calvin
2009	Call Back	Levi
2009	State of Play	Milt
2010	A Little Help	Paul Helms
2010	Arts & Crafts (short)	Rob
2010	Group Sex	Donny
2011	Lifetripper	Stan Norman
2012	The Case of the Missing Garden Gnome (short)	Seamus
2012	Sexy Daddy	
2013	Grow	Unknown
2013	The Sidekick	Max McCabe
2015	Bad, Bad Men	Ken
2018	30 Miles from Nowhere	Larry
2021	Violet	Fred Collins

=== Television ===
Year	Title	Role	Notes
1996	Beverly Hills, 90210	Student	Episode: "Fade In, Fade Out"
1997	Alright Already	Jason	Episode: "Again with the Jessica's Boyfriend"
1998	Pacific Blue	Craig	Episode: "Treasure Hunt"
1999	Wasteland	Unknown	Episode: "Death Becomes Her"
1998–2002	Felicity	Richard Coad	36 episodes
2000	Snoops	Marv	Episode: "Swan Chant"
2000	Chicago Hope	Dr. Peter Ball	Episodes: "Faith, Hope & Surgery" and "Painful Cuts"
2000	Buffy the Vampire Slayer	Jape	Episode: "Superstar"
2000	Opposite Sex	Cecil Livengood	Episode: "The Car"
2000	Mysterious Ways	Warren	Episode: "Stranger in the Mirror"
2002	NYPD Blue	Jeff Gamble	Episode: "Jealous Hearts"
2002–2003	Birds of Prey	Gibson Kafka	4 episodes
2004	Come to Papa	Judah	4 episodes
2005	NCIS	Aaron Alan Wright	Episode: "Doppelgänger"
2005	Medium	Male Passenger	Episode: "Being Mrs. O'Leary's Cow"
2005	Alias	Brodien	Episodes: "Authorized Personnel Only (Part 1)" and "Before the Flood"
2005	Monk	Jonathan Davenport	Episode: "Mr. Monk Goes to a Wedding"
2005–2006	Threshold	Lucas Pegg	13 episodes
2008	Dirt	Keith Straub	Episode: "Welcome to Normal"
2008	House	Dr. Jaime Conway	Episode: "Living the Dream"
2008	Burn Notice	Eddie Ash	Episode: "Bad Blood"
2008–2009	Head Case	Jeremy Berger	21 episodes
2009	CSI: Crime Scene Investigation	Brian Morley	Episode: "No Way Out"
2009–2020	Supernatural	Chuck Shurley/Carver Edlund; God	Recurring role
2010	'Til Death	Rainbow	Episode: "Independent Action"
2010	Cold Case	Steve Burke '89	Episode: "Almost Paradise"
2010	Law & Order: LA	Adam Yarborough	Episode: "Pasadena"
2011	Svetlana	Unknown	Episode: "Episode #2.9"
2012	Shameless	Dr. Noah Pitts	Episode: "Can I Have a Mother"
2012	Psych	Jerry Mandlebaum	Episode: "True Grits"
2012	Hawaii Five-0	Jarrod Prodeman	Episode: "Pa Make Loa"
2012	NCIS: Los Angeles	Jarrod Prodeman	Episode: "Touch of Death"
2012	Touch	Walt King, The Invisible Prince	Episodes: "Safety in Numbers" and "Gyre, Part 2"
2013	The Mentalist	Paul Friedman	Episode: "Red in Tooth and Claw"
2013	1600 Penn	Skeptic	Episode "Skip the Tour"
2013	Susanna	Peter	6 episodes
2013	Franklin & Bash	Sandy Hall	2 episodes
2015	The Hillywood Show	Cain	1 episode: Supernatural Parody
2015	Documentary Now!	Larry Fein	Episode: "Sandy Passage"
2015	Masters of Sex	Jonathan Laurents	3 episodes
2016–2017	Kings of Con	Rob Bennett	10 episodes
2017	WannabeZ	The Manager	Episode "Pilot"
2019	Bosch	Dr. Victor Hansen	2 episodes
2019	NCIS: New Orleans	Liam	2 episodes
2021	Lucifer	Vincent Le Mec	3 episodes
2021	NCIS: Hawaiʻi	Damian Davenport	Episode: "Legacy"
2023	Leverage: Redemption	Dr. Daniel Gray	Episode: "The Work Study Job"
2023	The Winchesters	Tango	Episode: "Hang on to Your Life"
2024	Law & Order	Scott Kelton	Episode: "Last Dance"
2024	The Boys	Splinter	Episode: "Life Among the Septics"
2025	9-1-1	Ozzie Smith	Episode: "Disconnected"

=== Video games ===
Year	Title	Role
2003	Jak II	Vin
2004	Jak 3	Vin
