= Come to Papa (podcast) =

Comedy podcast

Come To Papa
- Come to Papa with Tom Papa cover art
- Genre: Comedy
- Language: Canadian English

Cast and voices
- Hosted by: Tom Papa

Production
- Length: Approx. 1 hour

Technical specifications
- Audio format: MP3

Publication
- No. of episodes: 678
- Original release: 2013 – 2020
- Provider: All Things Comedy
- Updates: Weekly

Related
- Website: soundcloud.com/cometopapa

Original cover art for the podcast

Come To Papa was a comedy podcast co-hosted by Tom Papa and Paul C. Morrissey. The show is named after Come to Papa, a cancelled 2004 sitcom created by and starring Papa.

== Background ==
The podcast is part of the All Things Comedy podcast network. Time Out magazine named Come To Papa the Best Podcast of 2013. Papa has also hosted a live version of the show, which was recorded for Sirius XM, with scripted sketches performed by comedians, stand-up sets and musical guests.

== Guest appearances ==
Guests on the show have included Jerry Seinfeld, Mel Brooks, Rob Zombie, Carl Reiner, Dick Cavett, and Ray Romano. Cynthia Koury-Papa, Tom Papa's wife, has made guest appearances on the podcast for the 2012 Christmas episode, 2015 Live at Largo episode, and the 2017 SF Sketchfest episode.

== Other ventures ==
Tom Papa was busy publishing a book, hosting a new Food Network show, and doing a stand-up comedy tour in 2018 in addition to the podcast.

== See also ==
- Come to Papa (TV series)
