= Science of Stupid =

Comedic TV series on National Geographic

- Genre: Science Comedy
- Presented by: Richard Hammond/Dallas Campbell (UK); Seth Herzog/Ben Aaron (US); Manish Paul (IN); Ramon Bautista (PH); Ymke Wieringa (NL); Dorota Wellman (PL); Alejandro Wiebe (AR); Alfonso Herrera (MX); Sharabal Ayoub/Hasan Hamdan/Shadi Shamas (LB)
- Countries of origin: United Kingdom; India; Philippines; Netherlands; Poland; Argentina; México; Middle East
- Original languages: English; Hindi; Filipino/English; Dutch; Polish; Spanish; Arabic
- No. of episodes: 89

Production
- Camera setup: Self-footage
- Running time: 25 minutes
- Production companies: IWC Media; NGC Studios

Original release
- Network: National Geographic Channel; TTV; Fox HD
- Release: 21 July 2014 – 20 March 2015

Science of Stupid is a comedic television series on the National Geographic Channel. The British version of the show was initially hosted by Richard Hammond, later replaced by Dallas Campbell.

== Summary ==
In each episode, viral videos where the subjects typically take on dangerous or silly activities and end up inflicting unintended physical self-harm are analyzed in a comedic way for their underlying scientific principles. The series takes these clips as cautionary tales and real world examples of actions that should not be repeated by the audience.

Localised versions of the series utilize the same viral videos, however the hosts, language, references, and jokes differ by country.

== Episodes ==
A total of 29 episodes have been telecast over two seasons in the UK. A total of 86 episodes were telecast in the Philippines over four seasons, each written by host Ramon Bautista and frequent collaborators Rohit Tharani and Ra Rivera.

=== Series overview ===
Series	Episodes	Originally released	
Series	Episodes	First released	Last released
1	14	21 July 2014	7 August 2014
2	15	2 March 2015	20 March 2015

=== Season 1 (2014) ===
No. in season	Title	Original release date
1	"Dancing Disasters"	21 July 2014
The host reveals how adventures turn to misadventures as he explores some of the most spectacular and humiliating scientific mishaps.
2	"Discus for Dummies"	22 July 2014
Learn how many ways there are to embarrass, injure and humiliate yourself when riding a unicycle or jumping off a roof.
3	"Gravity's Call"	23 July 2014
The host presents experiments gone wrong, revealing how easy it is for scientists to injure themselves while pole dancing, playing on a pogo stick or cutting down trees.
4	"Cannon Ball Ice Dude"	24 July 2014
The host combines science and home footage to reveal how easy it can be for a person to injure or embarrass themselves while walking on ice or riding in a shopping trolley.
5	"What A Drag"	25 July 2014
The host examines footage of people horse-riding, diving and using exercise balls as he reveals how misadventures can occur.
6	"Human Tower Disasters"	28 July 2014
The host uses science and home footage to reveal the humiliating and painful potential of scooter stunts, break-dancing and swinging on ropes.
7	"Airbags vs. Airheads"	29 July 2014
The host examines how accidents can occur while knocking down buildings, sledging and abusing airbags.
8	"Learning to Fly"	30 July 2014
The host uses science and home footage to reveal the humiliating and painful potential of karate kicks, snowboarding on water and urban-biking bunny hops.
9	"Rooftop Drops"	31 July 2014
The host uses science and home footage to reveal the humiliating and painful potential of riding a rodeo bull, and hanging upside down.
10	"Human Tower Disasters"	1 August 2014
The host uses science and home footage to reveal the humiliating and painful ways people can injure themselves walking on stilts, firing a slingshot and playing a round of golf.
11	"Zip Line Fails"	4 August 2014
The host uses science and home footage to reveal the humiliating and painful potential of riding down a zip line, playing on swings or swallowing powdered cinnamon.
12	"Bungee Cord Snaps"	5 August 2014
The host uses science and home footage to reveal the humiliating and painful potential of bungee jumping, juggling and flying a kite - though not all at the same time.
13	"Pole Vault Mishaps"	6 August 2014
The host uses science to reveal the humiliating and painful potential of more YouTube disasters, featuring pole vaulting, ski jumping and rolling down a hill in a dustbin.
14	"Jet Pack Failure"	7 August 2014
The host uses science to reveal the humiliating and painful potential of more YouTube disasters, featuring people abseiling, running up walls and flying with a jet pack.

=== Season 2 (2015) ===
Season 2 premiered on 11 February 2015 with Hammond returning as host.

No. in season	Title	Original release date	Ref(s)
1	"EPISODE 1"	2 March 2015	TBA
What goes up, must come down! Kite surfers launch into the air, hurdlers miss their mark and break dancers lose their balance.
2	"EPISODE 2"	3 March 2015	TBA
Revisit your childhood watching others climb trees and play leapfrog. Amateur sand surfers attempt to overcome friction and avoid eating sand.
3	"EPISODE 3"	22:00, 11 February 2015	
Sliding down a hand rail on a staircase means you end up on the ground. And Ice Bucket Challengers take a hit to the head.
4	"EPISODE 4"	5 March 2015	TBA
Tune in for flying cars, flying kayaks and flying dirt bikers! A standing jump may seem simple but turns into a nose dive.
5	"EPISODE 5"	22:00, 18 February 2015	
There are many ways to embarrass and humiliate yourself when breathing fire, trying to run on water and performing tricks on a balance beam.
6	"EPISODE 6"	22:30, 18 February 2015	
What do Segways, water balloons and yo-yos have in common? They all pack a pretty powerful punch!
7	"EPISODE 7"	22:00, 25 February 2015	
Wintertime brings snow, ice, and fun when enjoyed wisely, but too much ambition sends some thrill seekers into the snow in a nose dive.
8	"EPISODE 8"	22:30, 25 February 2015	
It's best to learn the laws of physics - if you ignore them you're likely to be on a one-way flight to the pavement.
9	"EPISODE 9"	22:00, 4 March 2015	
Science experts reveal exactly how and why adventure can turn into misadventure.
10	"EPISODE 10"	22:30, 4 March 2015	
Tune in for a smashing time, filled with crashing, falling and exploding! Watch drivers spinning into trees and snowmobiles going off course.
11	"EPISODE 11"	22:30, 11 March 2015	
Exercise caution when headbanging, attempting a swan lift, or jumping into a bin, or you could embarrass and even injure yourself.
12	"EPISODE 12"	22:00, 11 March 2015	
Some people can dive into the sea from giant cliffs and emerge unscathed, while others end up bloody after diving from the bank of a river.
13	"EPISODE 13"	22:00, 18 March 2015	
We see how running downhill, attempting an aerial kick and launching a bottle rocket can all lead to disaster.
14	"EPISODE 14"	22:30, 18 March 2015	
Learn just you can embarrass, injure and humiliate yourself when driving over water, operating a crane and performing aerial tricks on skis.
15	"EPISODE 15"	22:00, 25 March 2015	
Prepare yourself as amateurs attempt billiard trick shots and try to show off their Frisbee talents.
TBA	"Episode 14"	22:30, 25 March 2015	
Walking downstairs, piggybacks, and climbing ladders.

=== Season 3 (2016) ===
No. in season	Title	Original release date	Ref
1	"Episode 1"	22:00, 11 May 2016	
Paragliding, dirt-bikes and wedgies.
4	"Episode 4"	22:30, 11 May 2016	
Cliff diving, sledgehammers and motorised scooters.
5	"Episode 5"	22:00, 18 May 2016	
Tandem motorbike wheelies, trampolines and giant hamster wheels.
3	"Episode 3"	22:30, 18 May 2016	
Street luge, gymnastics, and cycling downstairs.
9	"Episode 9"	22:00, 25 May 2016	
Snowboards, space hoppers and footballs.
11	"Episode 11"	22:30, 25 May 2016	
Basketballs, wakeboards and hover boards.
TBA	TBA	22:00, 1 June 2016	TBA
TBA	TBA	22:30, 1 June 2016	TBA
7	"Episode 7"	22:00, 8 June 2016	
Swerving motorbikes, bouncing on a bed, and giant catapults.
8	"Episode 8"	22:30, 8 June 2016	
Home-made toboggans and motorbike emergency stops.
10	"Episode 10"	22:00, 15 June 2016	
Kayaking down rapids, scaling tall buildings and pulling handbrake turns.
2	"Episode 2"	22:30, 15 June 2016	
Base jumping, bike tricks and sword wielding.
9	"Episode 9"	22:00, 22 June 2016	
Food fights, diving boards and skateboard jumps.
14	"Episode 14"	22:30, 22 June 2016	
Racetrack overtaking, jumping on an inflatable raft, and BMX flips.
15	"Episode 15"	22:00, 29 June 2016	
Caravans, trail bikes and breakdancing.
12	"Episode 12"	22:30, 29 June 2016	
Skiing and fishing.
16	"Episode 16"	22:00, 6 July 2016	
Ski lifts and bubble wrap.
17	"Episode 17"	22:30, 6 July 2016	
Bow and arrows and trailer loading.
TBA	"Most Unsporting Moments"	22:00, 13 July 2016	
TBA	"Most Painful Lessons"	22:30, 13 July 2016	
22	"Episode 22"	22:00, 19 October 2016	
Cycling and rooftop jumping.
21	"Episode 21"	22:30, 19 October 2016	
Unicycles, bubbles and remote control planes.
29	"Episode 29"	22:00, 26 October 2016	
Skiing, excavators and motorbike stunts.
26	"Episode 26"	22:30, 26 October 2016	
Selfies, dodgeball and motorcycling around obstacles.
30	"Episode 30"	22:00, 2 November 2016	
Tree jumping, sumo wrestling and moped ramp jumps.
23	"Episode 23"	22:30, 2 November 2016	
putting out a fire, driving through water, and doing a wheelie on a bicycle.
28	"Episode 28"	22:00, 9 November 2016	
Bicycles, balloons and boats.
24	"Episode 24"	22:30, 9 November 2016	
'Wall spin' parkour, sprinting and umbrella parachutes.
25	"Episode 25"	22:00, 16 November 2016	
Dancing, skydiving and fire skipping.
27	"Episode 27"	22:30, 16 November 2016	
Mountain bike jumps, long vehicle turning and cardboard toboggans.
32	"Episode 32"	22:00, 23 November 2016	
Cycling through water and hover board tricks.
33	"Episode 33"	22:30, 23 November 2016	
Swing backflips, fence climbing and headstands.
31	"Episode 31"	22:00, 30 November 2016	
Waterfall kayaking, cross-country running and cycling down mountains.
34	"Episode 34"	22:30, 30 November 2016	
Sand dune jumping, football dribbling and motorbike sidecars.

=== Season 5 (2017) ===
No. in season	Title	Original release date	Ref
9	"Episode 9"	25 September 2017	
Unicycling, segwayss, and arm-wrestling.
7	"Episode 7"	25 September 2017	
Dancing, snow jumping, and bottle flipping.
10	"Episode 10"	2 October 2017	
Inflatables on waterslides and punch bags.
3	"Episode 3"	2 October 2017	
Bungee jumping and swingball.
16	"Episode 16"	22:00, 9 October 2017	
Skateboard, clearing snow and getting out of a car.
6	"Episode 6"	22:30, 9 October 2017	
Jumping in a river, and carrying a tray.
2	"Episode 2"	22:00, 16 October 2017	
Canoeing, jumping over nets, and crutches.
5	"Episode 5"	22:30, 16 October 2017	
Catching a hard hat, bikes and water slides.
1	"Episode 1"	22:00, 23 October 2017	
Big wheel trikes and balancing items on your head.
12	"Episode 12"	22:30, 23 October 2017	
Push-ups and frisbee.
TBA	"Engineering Specials 1"	22:00, 30 October 2017	
TBA	"Engineering Specials 2"	22:30, 30 October 2017	
13	"On Motorbikes"	22:00, 6 November 2017	
14	"On Water"	22:30, 6 November 2017	
15	"Driving"	22:00, 13 November 2017	
Accidents involving vehicles.
16	"Cats And Friends"	22:00, 20 November 2017	
17	"Dogs And Friends"	22:00, 27 November 2017	

== Broadcast ==
Localised versions are produced in other territories with hosts such as Seth Herzog in the United States, later replaced by Ben Aaron, Manish Paul in India, Ramon Bautista in the Philippines and Ymke Wieringa in the Netherlands. Versions are also broadcast in Latin America (one in Argentina and other in Mexico, with the same title), Brazil and Germany. The first episode aired on 21 July 2014. The second season of the show debuted on 2 March 2015, and the National Geographic Abu Dhabi Arabic Version are produced in other territories with hosts such as Sharabal Ayoub, then Dani Bastani, Fouad Shamas, later Shadi Shamas, Hasan Hamdan in Middle East aired on 2014.
