= Nida Khurshid =

American actress

- Born: November 29, 1993 (age 32); Lahore, Pakistan
- Occupation: Actress
- Years active: 2016–present

Nida Khurshid (born 29 November 1993) is an American actress. She is best known for playing Latika Desai in the dark fantasy drama series The Winchesters.

== Early life ==
Khurshid was born in Lahore, Pakistan. She moved to the United States at the age of 3 and lived in East Bernard, Texas. She was raised a Muslim and spoke Urdu as her first language which made her struggle to settle into the new cultural norms. She studied ballet for 13 years which made her realise she wanted to perform on stage.

== Career ==
Early on in her career she was a member of Disney Discovers Talent Showcase and appeared in the legal drama television series For the People. She made a one-off appearance in the procedural drama series Station 19. Her biggest role so far has been playing Latika Desai in the dark fantasy drama series The Winchesters.

== Personal life ==
In her spare time she likes cooking meals for her family and says she still aspires to be a chef. She said she was inspired to pursue the entertainment industry by the novel The Alchemist and the alchemist Paracelsus

== Filmography ==
=== Film ===
Year	Title	Role	Notes
2016	Presence	Sarina	
2016	Chunk & Bean	Hot Chick	
2017	Body Art	Lia	Short
2019	The Laundromat	Sexy Waitress	
2019	Christmas Reservations	Preena Patel	
2021	Ikarus	Queen	Short

=== Television ===
Year	Title	Role	Notes
2016	Pitch	Ana	Episode; Wear It
2017	Game Shakers	Melinda	Episode; The Switch
2019	For the People	Serena Nazari	2 episodes
2018-2020	Adversity	Farah Nejem	6 episodes
2022	Station 19	Hima	Episode; Into the Woods
2021	Disney Television Discovers: Talent Showcase	Bree	Episode; Life Partners
2022	Danger Force	Major Babe	2 episodes
2022-2023	The Winchesters	Latika Desai	13 episodes
