= This One's for the Fellows =

This One's For the Fellows

Studio album by various artists: tribute to the Young Fresh Fellows
- Released: 2004
- Genre: rock music
- Label: BlueDisguise Records

This One's For the Fellows is a tribute album of songs originally by the rock band Young Fresh Fellows. It was released in 2004 by BlueDisguise Records. The title refers to the Fellows' album This One's For the Ladies.

== Track listing ==
1. Rock & Roll Pest Control - The Presidents of the United States of America
2. Love is a Beautiful Thing - The Silos
3. How Much About Last Night Do You Remember? - Eric Kassel & Friends
4. Mamie Dunn / Good Times Rock'n'Roll - Robyn Hitchcock
5. No One Really Knows - The Maroons with Steve Malkmus
6. Lost Track Of Time - Carla Torgerson & Amy Stolzenbach
7. Get Outta My Cave - Comb-Over
8. Still There's Hope - Visqueen
9. This One's For the Ladies - The Figgs
10. Celebration - John Ramberg & Christy McWilson
11. Unimaginable Zero Summer - Johnny Sangster
12. Deep, Down & In-Between - The Mendoza Line
13. Hillbilly Drummer Girl - I Can Lick Any Sonofabitch In the House
14. Take My Brain Away / Teenage Dogs in Trouble - Emily Bishton & Conrad Uno
15. Rotation - The Black Panties
16. Telephone Tree - Louden Swain
17. I Lose Control - Marshall Artist
18. 99 Girls - The Groovie Ghoulies
19. I Hate Everything - Charlie Chesterman & the Legendary Motorbikes
20. Don't You Wonder How It Ends? - The Makers
21. (hidden track) Teenage Dogs in Trouble - The Mono Men with Scott McCaughey (lead singer/songwriter of the Fellows)
