= I Can Lick Any Sonofabitch in the House =

US musical group

- Origin: Portland, Oregon, United States
- Genres: Southern rock, alt-country, punk rock
- Years active: 2001-present
- Labels: Sad Crow Records, Suburban Home, In Music We Trust
- Members: Michael Dean Damron; Jon Burbank; Flapjack Texas; David Lipkind; Mole Harris
- Website: www.icanlickanysob.com

I Can Lick Any Sonofabitch in the House is an American southern rock / punk / country band from Portland, Oregon. The group was formed in 2001 by singer-songwriter and former amateur boxer Michael Dean Damron, and their sound reflects a varied influence of heavy southern style rock, 1970s rock, country, blues, and punk rock. Lyrically the band is known for progressive political themes, speaking out against conservatives, gun rights advocates, and the Westboro Baptist Church among others, as well as for darker, country influenced songs about fear, loss, and death in modern America. They have been lauded for their high energy live performances driven by Damron's distinctive growl and the band's dueling lead guitar and harmonica.

== History ==
After spending a few years as a boxer in the army's 101st Airborne Division, an amateur boxer in Las Vegas, and a stint as the bassist for Texas-based Mercury Records artist Tablet, Damron relocated to Portland, Oregon in the late 1990s and began performing as a singer/songwriter. After some early success as a solo artist, he decided to try his hand at a heavier, more 1970s rock oriented sound. Borrowing the famous boast of bare knuckled boxing champion John L. Sullivan for the group's name, in 2001 Damron created I Can Lick Any Sonofabitch in the House and began performing locally in Portland.

Initially the band was composed of a rotation of local blues, rock, and country stalwarts, but Damron soon decided he wanted to focus more seriously on the full band, and recruited guitarist Jon Burbank, drummer Flapjack Texas, bassist Dewey Neilsen, and David Lipkind on harmonica to record the band's first album, Creepy Little Noises, which was released in 2002 on In Music We Trust Records. Neilson left the band shortly after, and bassist Mole Harris joined in late 2002, finalizing the group's permanent lineup.

The group began touring regularly throughout the US from 2002 through 2006, releasing three more well acclaimed albums along the way; 2003's Put Here to Bleed, 2004's Menace, and their live album, 2006's Live at Dante's.

At the end of 2006, citing a lack of fun and a desire to work on more varied styles, Damron left the band. The band had recently finished recording much of what was to be their 4th studio album, and Damron later re-recorded some of the songs for 2008's Bad Days Ahead, now performing as Michael Dean Damron & Thee Loyal Bastards.

After nearly four years, the band reunited in 2010. They completed recording and post-production of the album that had nearly been finished in 2006, and in late 2010 released The Sounds of Dying on Denver, Colorado–based Suburban Home Records. They resumed playing regularly and occasionally touring throughout the western US. In 2011, they self-released Live in Seattle, a live DVD of a 2010 performance at the legendary Tractor Tavern in Seattle, WA.

In April 2013 the band completed production on their 5th studio album, entitled Mayberry. The album was released in June 2013 on the band's own label, Sad Crow Records.

On May 8th, 2025, the band announced via its Facebook page that Damron died from complications of liver cancer.

== Personnel ==
- Michael Dean Damron - vocals/guitar
- Jon Burbank - lead guitar
- David Lipkind - harmonica
- Flapjack Texas - drums
- Mole Harris - bass

== Discography ==
=== Albums ===
- Creepy Little Noises - 2002 - In Music We Trust Records
- Put Here to Bleed - 2003 - In Music We Trust Records
- Menace - 2005 - In Music We Trust Records
- Live at Dante's - 2006 - In Music We Trust Records
- The Sounds of Dying - 2010 - Suburban Home Records
- Live in Seattle DVD - 2011 - Self Released
- Mayberry - 2013 - Sad Crow Records

=== Appearances ===
- This One's for the Fellows - a tribute to The Young Fresh Fellows - 2004 BlueDisguise Records
