= Duck Quacks Don't Echo (American TV series) =

American comedy panel game show

- Genre: Comedy
- Presented by: Tom Papa
- Country of origin: United States
- Original language: English
- No. of seasons: 1
- No. of episodes: 14

Production
- Running time: 30 minutes (inc. ads)

Original release
- Network: National Geographic Channel
- Release: January 13 – March 3, 2014

Duck Quacks Don't Echo is an American television comedy panel game show that aired in 2014 on the on National Geographic Channel, presented by comedian Tom Papa with co-hosts Michael Ian Black and Seth Herzog. The premise was derived from the British series of the same name.

== Premise ==
In each episode, each host presents an unusual fact. Some facts are explained via video segments, while others are tested on-stage. At the end of the show, the audience votes for the best fact and the winner gets the Golden Quack award.

== Episodes ==
=== Season 1 ===
Episode	Original air date	Facts (winner in bold)
1	January 13, 2014	Airborne bacteria from a toilet flush can reach your toothbrush up to 6 feet away.; It is impossible to eat 6 crackers in one minute without water.; When you lie, your temperature rises and your nose gets hot.; **You can make a hovercraft with junk from your basement.**
2	January 13, 2014	In a public restroom, the stall closest to the door is the cleanest.; You cannot write the number 6 while at the same time moving your leg on the same side in a clockwise direction.; **Four ceramic coffee mugs can support the weight of a 2.5 ton truck.**
3	January 20, 2014	Even if people only THINK they are consuming alcohol, they will act drunk.; Shrimp have much greater endurance than humans.; **Without saliva, you can't taste anything.**; Male enhancement drugs can make flowers stay erect.
4	January 20, 2014	Pigeons can recognize human faces.; **It's possible to dance on pudding.**; There is a part of the human body that is impervious to pain.; Wearing swimsuits makes you dumber.
5	January 27, 2014	**The color red does not make a bull angry.**; It's possible to hang upside down from the ceiling suspended by nothing more than household glue.; You can separate an egg yolk from an egg white using a plastic bottle.
6	January 27, 2014	You can stretch a bathing cap so wide that you can fit an adult in it.; Microscopic eyelash mites live in your eyelashes.; **People are more likely to believe statements that rhyme.**
7	February 3, 2014	The color red makes women more attractive to men.; **It is possible for a human encased in bubble wrap to survive a 13 ft drop.**; If you stack balls of descending size and drop them, the top ball will rocket into the air.; Cows with names produce more milk than cows without names.
8	February 3, 2014	Debris shot from a lawnmower can have a force greater than a bullet from a 9mm handgun.; **When you swing a pendulum, it never goes past the point of its release.**; You can bend water with static electricity.
9	February 17, 2014	**Swearing helps increase pain tolerance.**; Ferrari engines are designed to idle in a major chord.; There is a species of caterpillar that blindly follow each other.
10	February 17, 2014	**Over a distance of a mile or under, a carrier pigeon can be faster than a fax machine.**; Smells won't wake you when you are fast asleep.; The chicken came first.
11	February 24, 2014	Certain songs are guaranteed to make your baby dance.; **When we are scared, our feet get colder.**; Coconut water can be a substitute for blood plasma.
12	February 24, 2014	**Dogs copy human yawns.**; Women remember routes better than men.; The lighter was invented before the match.
13	March 3, 2014	Redheads have a higher pain tolerance than non-redheads.; **It is possible to scale a wall using ordinary vacuum cleaners.**; Bananas can make music.; Attractive women make men dumber.
14	March 3, 2014	**The dirtier a pool, the more it smells like chlorine.**; Your pupils expand when you see something attractive.; There is an animal whose heart is as big as a car.
