= Beat The Genius =

Indian game show

- Show poster
- Genre: Game Show
- Directed by: Advait Shelke
- Presented by: Manish Paul
- Starring: Parnab Mukherjee
- Country of origin: India
- Original language: Hindi
- No. of seasons: 1
- No. of episodes: 28

Production
- Production location: India
- Running time: 10 minutes

Original release
- Release: 10 November 2020

Beat The Genius is an Indian quiz game show that debuted on video streaming platform Flipkart Video on 10 November 2020. The show is an original series of Flipkart Video featuring Manish Paul as a host and Parnab Mukherjee as a quizmaster. In every episode, viewers are asked five questions, and four options are given for each question, from which the correct answer must be chosen.

== Show format ==
It is a daily game show where home viewers are the contestants. The show features 28 episodes, each lasting for a little over 10 minutes. The host Manish Paul asks five questions in each episode and gives four options. These questions are asked to both the quizmaster and the playing audience, and 15 seconds are given for each question. Any contestant with a cumulative score more than the quizmaster is declared the winner.

== Cast ==
The show's cast comprises Manish Paul and Parnab Mukherjee, who is a media analyst, knowledge resource curator, performance consultant, and a theater director. As a journalist he has worked with Sportsworld, The Asian Age, and Sambad Pratidin and has written on human rights, internal displacement and the idea and notions of haves.
