= The Winchesters =

American dark fantasy television series

- Genre: Dark fantasy; Drama; Mystery
- Based on: Supernatural by Eric Kripke
- Developed by: Robbie Thompson
- Starring: Meg Donnelly; Drake Rodger; Nida Khurshid; Jojo Fleites; Demetria McKinney; Bianca Kajlich
- Narrated by: Jensen Ackles
- Composers: Jay Gruska; Philip White
- Country of origin: United States
- Original language: English
- No. of seasons: 1
- No. of episodes: 13

Production
- Executive producers: Jensen Ackles; Danneel Ackles; Robbie Thompson; Glen Winter; David H. Goodman
- Production location: New Orleans
- Cinematography: David Moxness
- Editor: Hilary Bolger
- Camera setup: Single-camera
- Running time: 41–42 minutes
- Production companies: Chaos Machine Productions; Wonderland Sound and Vision; Here There; CBS Studios; Warner Bros. Television

Original release
- Network: The CW
- Release: October 11, 2022 – March 7, 2023

Related
- Supernatural

The Winchesters is an American dark fantasy drama television series developed by Robbie Thompson and is a spin-off of Supernatural (2005–2020), set in an alternate universe within the same multiverse as the parent show and following a group of young monster hunters formed in 1972 by Mary Campbell and John Winchester, the future parents of Supernatural's main protagonists Dean and Sam Winchester. It premiered on The CW on October 11, 2022, and concluded on March 7, 2023. In May 2023, the series was canceled after one season.

== Synopsis ==
Set in the 1970s, Dean Winchester narrates the story of how his parents, John Winchester and Mary Campbell, met, fell in love, and fought monsters together while in search of their missing fathers.

== Cast and characters ==
=== Main ===
- Meg Donnelly as Mary Campbell, de facto leader of the "Monster Club", born into a long line of hunters
- Drake Rodger as John Winchester, a young Marine returned from Vietnam who has recently discovered his own family's link to the supernatural
- Nida Khurshid as Latika "Lata" Desai, a young hunter-in-training and the group's lore expert
- Jojo Fleites as Carlos Cervantez, a confident fighter against demons and musician, whose van serves as the group's main transport
- Demetria McKinney as Ada Monroe, a bookstore owner who takes interest in the occult
- Bianca Kajlich as Millie Winchester, John's mother, a mechanic who owns the Winchesters Garage

=== Recurring ===
- Jensen Ackles as Dean Winchester, John and Mary's future son (narrator)
- Tom Welling as Samuel Campbell, Mary's father, an experienced hunter
- Bridget Regan as Rockin' Roxy, a pirate radio DJ
- Andrea Londo as Betty Donelan, a policewoman who is John's ex-fiancée
- Ryan McCartan as Kyle Reed, a journalist who goes on a date with Mary

=== Guest ===
- Gil McKinney as Henry Winchester, John's father, an initiate of the Men of Letters who disappeared along with the rest of the organization 15 years ago, reprising the role from Supernatural
- Rob Benedict as Tango, a musician in The Jericho Kid's band
- Richard Speight Jr. as Loki, Norse trickster god, who also appeared in the role on Supernatural
- Charles Shaughnessy as Jack Wilcox, a Man of Letters expelled for unethical human experimentation
- Ruth Connell as Rowena MacLeod, an immortal witch who appeared on Supernatural
- Jim Beaver as Bobby Singer, a hunter from Supernatural
- Alexander Calvert as Jack Kline, a nephilim raised by Dean, Sam and Castiel who became the new God on Supernatural

== Episodes ==
No.	Title	Directed by	Written by	Original release date	Prod. code	U.S. viewers (millions)
1	"Pilot"	Glen Winter	Robbie Thompson	October 11, 2022	T15.10162	0.78
On March 23, 1972, John Winchester returns home to Lawrence, Kansas, from the Vietnam War, where he meets Mary Campbell, whose father Samuel has recently disappeared. Having received a letter from his own long-missing father Henry via a mysterious man prior to the episode's start, John is drawn to an abandoned Men of Letters clubhouse (an organization that fought the supernatural using arcane knowledge rather than brute force) where Mary saves him from a demon. Introduced to the world of the supernatural, John learns that his father was a Man of Letters and that the Campbells are monster hunters, and joins Mary's search for Samuel, who was looking for a magical box created by the MOL that can trap and destroy monsters. With the help of Mary's friends Latika and Carlos, they track the box to a New Orleans cemetery where they face both a loup-garou watchdog set by the MOL and a demon possessing Ada Monroe. While John kills the monster, the others are able to use the box to exorcise and destroy the demon. In the aftermath, Ada explains that the box is the only thing that can kill the Akrida, monsters from another world that seek to invade Earth. With the Men of Letters gone and unable to stop them, Samuel was seeking the box to stop a coming invasion. John learns that his mother Millie knew Henry was a Man of Letters and kept this from him. Deciding to become a hunter, he joins the others in traveling to Savannah, Georgia in pursuit of another lead. Narrating these events, Dean Winchester reveals that, unbeknownst to the group, the Akrida are a threat to all of existence and he intends to continue searching for more information on this lost chapter of his parents' lives.
2	"Teach Your Children Well"	John F. Showalter	Robbie Thompson & David H. Goodman	October 18, 2022	T13.24102	0.46
In Savannah, the group finds the MOL files on the Akrida gone, but signs of Samuel having been present, including several dispatched zombies and a newspaper clipping directing them to a case in Topeka, Kansas. Upon returning home, John clashes with his mother over his hunting and storms off. In Topeka, kids have begun vanishing from a commune, taken by a shapeshifting monster, so the four young hunters go undercover as hippies. Mary's desperation to put the case to bed and resume the search for Samuel leads her to clash with the others, putting John in danger when the monster assumes the form of Millie and kidnaps him. The group identifies it as La Tunda, an abusive mother who was transformed into a monster that consumes disobedient children. Locating La Tunda's lair, they rescue her victims and kill La Tunda with a piece of her own wooden leg. John reconciles with his mother while Ada uses a potion and automatic writing to access the echoes of the demon that had possessed her, searching for information on the other demon that the group had fought in the hopes that it will have information on the Akrida and the box. Mary makes up with the others, admitting that she should take the rest of her team's input into account contrary to the example set by her father. At the same time, the Akrida leader enters La Tunda's lair wearing a hooded cloak, absorbs a piece of her essence into a vial and is followed by several locust-like Akrida as it leaves.
3	"You're Lost Little Girl"	Claudia Yarmy	Gabriel Alejandro Garza	October 25, 2022	T13.24103	0.55
Mary's young neighbor Carrie whom she sometimes babysits is abducted, leading Mary, John and Lata on a search for her while Ada and Carlos hunt for the partner of the demon that had possessed Ada. The demon reveals that he and his partner, convinced that the Akrida can't be stopped even with the box, had made a deal to trade the box for their lives. However, he doesn't know anything about how the box itself works or about the Akrida aside from the fact that the Akrida leader has taken a human vessel. Rather than exorcise the demon, Ada magically traps him in a bonsai tree. Mary and John explain to Carrie's brother Ford what they do, and he coins the name "Monster Club" for their group. After Ford is also abducted, it's discovered that the culprit is Bori Baba, an Indian boogeyman who lures children in using items that they are seeking. Mary enters Bori Baba's bag to rescue the children while Lata learns from an estranged relative that the victims must destroy the items that they are seeking in order to be free. John is able to communicate this to Mary using a CB radio, forcing her to face her fears of life after hunting (symbolized by her father's cowboy hat). When the monster follows them out, John is able to kill it and Carrie and Ford are reunited with their mom. During this time, John is reunited and makes amends with his ex-fiancée Betty, who has become a cop, while Mary enjoys a date at the movies. The appearance of La Tunda and Bori Baba, two rare monsters from far-flung parts of the world, worries the group about the implications while an Akrida brings Bori Baba's bag to its leader, who absorbs a piece of the monster's essence as she did with La Tunda. The Akrida leader is revealed to be possessing Rockin' Roxy, a local DJ.
4	"Masters of War"	John T. Kretchmer	Julia Cooperman	November 1, 2022	T13.24104	0.57
The Monster Club investigates the death of Patches, a World War II veteran, leading John and Carlos, who is revealed to be a former Navy Corpsman, to join a therapy group that Patches had been a part of. Mary learns from her movie date, a reporter named Kyle Reed, that there has been a number of similar veteran deaths across the country. The case forces John and Carlos to confront their trauma from the Vietnam War while Mary and Lata confront their own grief over the loss of Mary's cousin Maggie, Lata's best friend, who was killed last year by vampires. It's discovered that the veterans' killer is Mars Neto, a Celtiberian war god who posed as one of the group members. Holding Carlos hostage, Mars reveals that a war is coming with the Akrida and that he believes that John, as both a hunter and a soldier, could be sharpened into a powerful weapon to defeat them. As John fights Mars, Mary, Lata and Millie find and destroy Mars' amphora, rendering him vulnerable and allowing John to kill him by bludgeoning him savagely over and over. However, the dying Mars tells John that he is now ready for the war with the Akrida. In the aftermath, Mary cleans out Maggie's old room, Carlos continues to attend therapy and John breaks down crying while showering fully clothed as Millie comforts him.
5	"Legend of a Mind"	Lisa Soper	Sehaj Sethi	November 15, 2022	T13.24105	0.46
The Monster Club investigate a series of strange deaths that they believe to be the work of a dreamwalking djinn. At an abandoned warehouse, the hunters encounter Tony, a half-djinn who is Ada's estranged son from her relationship with a djinn named Ali who was killed by hunters. While the rest go off to search for leads, Ada and Carlos stay behind to confront Tony. However, Tony confronts Ada in a dream. Still angry about her lying to him about his dad for years, and hurt that she thinks he is killing people, he informs Ada that he has actually been using his djinn abilities to help people face their fears and heal, while only feeding from their minds enough to get by. He reveals that the Akrida are actually responsible, having encountered one in the mind of one of the victims while trying to help him, and that he was lured to the town by a strange sound only monsters can hear. The team learns the victims were all injected with a neurotoxin that allowed the Akrida to control their bodies and ultimately proved fatal to them. While protecting the next intended victim, whose name Tony passed along to Ada, Mary is attacked by an Akrida and injected with the toxin. Ada convinces Tony to use his dreamwalking powers to help John enter Mary's mind, where she faces the trauma of the night that her parents told a five-year old Mary that she would grow up to hunt monsters, allowing her to destroy the Akrida stingers. In the aftermath, Tony reveals that the Akrida are collecting the essence of rare monsters and the group deduces that the victims are all connected to a radio tower project that the Akrida are using to broadcast a signal to draw the monsters in. Having finally reconciled with Tony, Ada decides to leave with him to make sure he gets to a safe place far away from the Akrida. From records of the project, they identify Rockin' Roxy as the Akrida leader. Another Akrida warns Roxy that Mary has failed to fall under their control, but she is unconcerned, believing that the Akrida will get the hunters the way that they want eventually. Throughout these events, John continues to develop romantic feelings for Mary, but he chooses not to reveal them in favor of encouraging Mary to follow her dream of leaving town to find a new life after she eventually quits hunting.
6	"Art of Dying"	Geary McLeod	Jess Kardos	November 22, 2022	T13.24106	0.50
The gang must protect Mary's old family friend Tracy Gellar, whom she admires for having successfully retired from the hunting life, from a soucouyant that's been killing off former members of Tracy's band of hunters. John puts himself at risk going after the soucouyant and Mary manages to cut off one of its arms before it flees. John and Mary argue about John's reluctance to talk about what happened with Mars Neto and his using his determination to keep Mary alive long enough for her to retire as an excuse to throw himself into hunting and avoid his own issues. Lata introduces the group to Anton, a taxidermist friend of hers who examines monster bodies, and Carlos is immediately smitten. Analyzing the severed arm, Anton reveals it has been long dead and contains ectoplasm instead of blood. The soucouyant turns out to be possessed by the ghost of hunter Mac, a member of Tracy's group who was tricked into a death trap by the others when he became addicted to dark magic and they feared he was going to turn on them. Mac leaves the soucouyant's body and possesses John in order to try to kill Tracy. By sharing details about her own past and why she became a pacifist, Lata manages to talk Mac into stopping his quest for vengeance and moving on as Tracy apologizes for not trying harder to help him. Afterwards, Tracy decides to resume hunting and John asks Lata for help controlling his own anger. She begins to teach him how to meditate, but they are interrupted when Carlos and Mary announce that they've located the radio tower being used by the Akrida to broadcast the signal that's luring rare monsters to Kansas.
7	"Reflections"	Richard Speight, Jr.	David H. Goodman & Robbie Thompson	December 6, 2022	T13.24107	0.41
The Monster Club finds the Akrida's radio tower abandoned and signs that Samuel has been captured and Roxy demands an exchange of the box for Samuel, in the process revealing that nothing of this world can hurt the Akrida. Ada finds files on the box in another abandoned Men of Letters office in Ann Arbor, Michigan, with the notes having been written by Henry Winchester. The notes, deciphered by Millie, reveal that the box is actually the Ostium, a portal that can banish monsters from this plane of existence, as well as the fact that the Akrida are all connected to their queen. If the queen is banished back to the Akrida's universe, the others will all die. The group performs a seance to summon Henry's ghost for more information and he reveals how the box can be recharged while getting to say the goodbye to his wife and son that he never had before. Assaulting Roxy's new base, Mary and John succeed in exorcising her and banishing the Akrida leader with the Ostium, but it fails to affect the other Akrida, revealing that the Akrida leader controlling Roxy's body wasn't actually their queen. Cornered, John and Mary kiss before an injured Samuel appears and uses the Ostium to banish the rest of the attacking Akrida. Throughout these events, the Akrida's possessed servants dig for what is revealed to be the Akrida Queen. Finding her, the servants bring the queen the monster essences, promising to make the queen strong again so that she can bring the others and the Akrida can make this world their own.
8	"Hang On to Your Life"	Amyn Kaderali	Nic Chatree Sridej	January 24, 2023	T13.24108	0.37
A recovering Samuel is treated by Millie and reveals he had been looking for a way to get rid of monsters from the world for good to give Mary a normal life when he discovered the Akrida, and had kept away from her in order to protect her. Not thrilled that his daughter has been hunting with the son of a "moleman" (Man of Letters), Samuel clashes with John, Mary and Millie, but makes peace with them. With the Ostium having been broken, Millie begins attempting to repair it. At the same time, Carlos and Lata discover that Carlos' old friend Jericho has made a deal with Loki for musical success, who demands first Jericho and then Carlos sacrifice innocent people to save themselves. After Carlos selflessly refuses to sacrifice his friends, Loki is trapped in his own indestructible hand mirror as a consequence of his defeat. Samuel leaves to hunt down magic possibly capable of stopping the Akrida with Ada, leaving the Monster Club to track down the Akrida Queen. Carlos performs before the rest of the group at the night club where Jericho was booked, and afterwards Mary finally decides to be with John. Amongst Samuel's light-damaged reconnaissance photos, John spots a picture of the man who gave him Henry's letter before the events of the pilot. He and Mary wonder about the identity of the man, who is revealed to the audience to be Dean Winchester, getting into the Impala in the photograph.
9	"Cast Your Fate to the Wind"	Kristin Windell	Rachel Lynett	January 31, 2023	T13.24109	0.35
Il Soarta, a vampire cult that worships the Ursitoare, the Romanian gods of fate, hunts for an amulet that can reveal a person's fate. The Monster Club finds the amulet hidden in the clubhouse, but it shows John dead and being fed upon by the vampire leader. Leaving John behind in the clubhouse, the others raid the vampires' lair, only to discover that they have the clubhouse's blueprints, which reveal a weak point in the defenses in the local sewers. As Mary and Carlos kill the other vampires, John and Millie are cornered by the leader. Taking his fate into his own hands, John has Millie electrocute him with a live wire to render him clinically dead so that when the Il Soarta leader feeds on him, the vampire ingests dead man's blood, poisoning him so that Mary can easily kill him. Millie and Mary manage to revive John with CPR, in the process revealing to the others John and Mary's romantic relationship which she had previously insisted upon hiding. Having avoided Anton following their date, Carlos decides to ask him out again. Throughout these events, John's ex-fiancée Betty becomes suspicious of the Monster Club's activities and colludes with Kyle Reed, the reporter that Mary had gone on a date with. Kyle is revealed to be under Akrida control and using Betty to investigate the Monster Club for the Akrida.
10	"Suspicious Minds"	Andi Armaganian	Gabriel Alejandro Garza & Julia Cooperman	February 7, 2023	T13.24110	0.29
In 1957, Dorothea Wilcox is attacked by an Akrida puppet and put into a vegetative state. In the present, the Akrida decide to focus their efforts on using the Monster Club to find the mystery man (Dean Winchester), who they know brought the hunters together to stop them. After failing to find any sign of the Akrida Queen at the locations that Samuel had previously scouted, Carlos and Lata approach Rockin' Roxy for help, learning that Roxy's life was ruined by her ordeal as the host of the Akrida's former leader, having lost her job and girlfriend and been plagued by nightmares of her time possessed. Using a form of magical hypnosis taught to her by Ada's son Tony Monroe, whom she has been dating, Lata is able to help Roxy fully recall her possession and the location of the Akrida Queen. Although Lata offers to erase Roxy's memories, Roxy chooses not to, wanting to remember that she helped to stop the Akrida. At the location indicated by Roxy, Carlos and Lata spot several Akrida puppets and realize that they've found the queen. Meanwhile, John and Mary are approached by a man claiming to be retired Man of Letters Porter Hobbes who offers them a way to kill the Akrida's queen by reverse-engineering a toxin from their stingers. Acting on Hobbes's claims, John and Mary abduct a possessed cop so that he can extract the Akrida stingers from him. However, the two eventually discover that he's actually Jack Wilcox, Dorothea's husband, who was kicked out of the order for human experimentation after Henry Winchester exposed him, and he has a Golem restrain them. Jack intends to use the stingers to transfer his and Dorothea's consciousnesses into John and Mary's bodies so they can live the full life together they were denied, but he dies in the fight that follows while Dorothea's life support is disconnected. Returning home after he and Mary bury the Wilcoxes and the cop, John is ambushed by Kyle, who kills himself and frames John for his murder as part of the Akrida's plans.
11	"You've Got a Friend"	Lisa Soper	Nicole Desperito	February 21, 2023	T13.24111	0.36
Cleaning up after their confrontation with Jack Wilcox and his Golem, Carlos, Mary, and Latika find John covered in blood after being framed by the Akrida for the murder of Kyle. Mary and John plan to head to her father's cabin to hide from the police, but John is arrested by Betty, who has been following them after Kyle made her suspicious of the group. Meanwhile, Carlos and Latika search Mary's house for a bracelet her cousin Maggie had that mystically leads to those who hide a dark secret. The bracelet attaches to Latika, but whoever wears it has to be pure of heart. The shadow entities in the bracelet lock them in the house and take the form of Maggie to force Lata to reveal her dark childhood secret, that her actions indirectly led to the death of a servant in her home growing up. An Akrida-possessed police officer grills John about the mystery man (Dean); John truthfully reveals he knows nothing about him but can tell that if they're scared of him then the man must be not of this world and can hurt the Akrida. The Akrida decide that John is no use to them and that his prison transport should suffer a fatal crash. Mary and Millie try to loop Betty into the Akrida situation but she won't believe it until they are able to get the bracelet on her and reveal the Akrida in the department. As John escapes and goes on the run with Mary, Betty becomes the Monster Club's spy in the police department.
12	"The Tears of a Clown"	Menhaj Huda	David H. Goodman	February 28, 2023	T13.24112	0.49
Frustrated in their search for the mystery man (Dean), the Monster Club finds an article about the mysterious disappearance of a teen named Wally at a carnival. They discover a link between disappearances at various carnivals and the legend of Limbo the Clown, who traps his victims as part of his clown troupe. The group discovers that during the Great Depression, Limbo made a deal with an occultist to be perpetually happy after losing everything and falling into a depression of his own, but must spread his happiness to others in order to maintain it, using an enchanted funhouse mirror. They work with a man named Clarence who has been searching for his little brother Roger. Limbo took Roger 30 years ago when Clarence took him to a carnival after their parents died. The group realize that Limbo is targeting people who are going through the lowest points of their lives, with the promise to never feel pain or sorrow ever again, turning them into clowns like himself. During this time, Mary and John start fighting about how Mary is using hunting to avoid her fears of facing the future while John is using their relationship to ignore the fact he's on the run, making them vulnerable to Limbo. Both Mary and John fall victim to Limbo's transformation and join the horde of clowns attacking Carlos and Lata, who end up trapped in a clown car that turns out to have Roger in the backseat. Carlos talks to Roger in an effort to get him to embrace reality. When Roger learns that his brother has spent all this time looking for him and desperately wants him back, he breaks the spell by crying for his brother. This causes Limbo to explode and his victims are freed. Roger is reunited with an overjoyed Clarence, and Wally is reunited with his parents. Mary and John recognize that they have been avoiding their problems and reconcile before Millie arrives with the news that she and Betty found a witness who has cleared John of Kyle's murder. At the same time, Ada's search for magic capable of stopping the Akrida leads her to Rowena, who offers to trade the magic for the demon that Ada had trapped in a bonsai, intending to torture it for information on her son (Crowley). After testing Ada's magical abilities, Rowena invites Ada to join her coven and provides her with a crystal that can kill the Akrida Queen when it is powered by a piece of Ada's own soul. Rowena reveals that the queen will use a planetary alignment to open her portal and Lata discovers that the alignment has already begun.
13	"Hey, That's No Way to Say Goodbye"	John Showalter	Robbie Thompson	March 7, 2023	T13.24113	0.44
In a flashback, after John returns from Vietnam, he is given Henry's letter by Dean, who is hunting the Akrida with Bobby Singer. In the present, a hunter named Joan Hopkins contacts Samuel Campbell and reveals herself to be the Akrida Queen. The last of a long line of hunters, Joan was driven insane in the 1600s by losing her family and loved ones and consuming monster essences, becoming convinced that humanity needed to be destroyed to prevent more hunters sacrificing themselves saving them. The Men of Letters banished her from the world as she couldn't be killed, and she ended up in the Akrida's dimension, where she became their queen. The Monster Club refuse Joan's offer of joining forces with her. After Lata is possessed by an Akrida who threatens to make her kill herself as this same Akrida did to Kyle, Ada sacrifices the magic Rowena gave her in order to kill it and save her friend's life. As John, Carlos and Samuel attempt to stop Joan from opening her portal, Mary, Lata, Ada and Millie use the Ostium (now repaired by Millie) to try to bring back Dean, who was banished by Joan. They succeed in bringing back the Impala, with which Mary is able to run over and kill Joan as the car is not of their world, destroying the Akrida as well. Dean rescues Mary from Joan's portal and reveals that the Monster Club is in an alternate universe to the one he was born in. While driving through Heaven after his death, Dean had taken a detour through the multiverse looking for a world where his family got a happy ending, only to find the Akrida, who were created by Chuck as a failsafe in case of his defeat. As the Akrida would eventually pose a threat to Sam's safety in their home universe as well, Dean defied Jack Kline's orders about non-interference to stop them. Before departing with Jack and Bobby, Dean gives his parents his hunter's journal to help guide them, and the Colt in case they ever encounter a certain yellow-eyed demon (Azazel, who killed Mary and set John on a lifelong path of vengeance in the backstory of Supernatural). When they ask his name, Dean hesitates before giving them a fake name, James Hetfield. He then vanishes with Jack and Bobby to return to Heaven. In the aftermath, Lata finds a way to restore Ada's soul and John and Mary set off to figure out their future together while their friends continue hunting.

== Production ==
=== Development ===
On June 24, 2021, it was reported that a prequel series of Supernatural, titled The Winchesters, that focuses on Sam and Dean's parents, John and Mary, was in development at The CW. The series is executive produced by Jensen Ackles, his wife Danneel Ackles (who portrayed Anael on the series), and Supernatural writer Robbie Thompson. Ackles also reprise his role as Dean Winchester as the narrator. A pilot order for the series was confirmed by The CW on February 3, 2022; the pilot was directed by Glen Winter.

On March 21, 2022, it was announced that Meg Donnelly and Drake Rodger were cast as Mary and John. On May 12, 2022, it was announced that The CW ordered it to series and premiered on October 11, 2022. In August 2022, it was confirmed that Ackles would reprise his role as Dean in a physical appearance in the first episode. On May 11, 2023, the CW canceled the series after one season. Producers Warner Bros. Television planned to shop the show to other outlets. On June 2, 2023, Deadline Hollywood reported that the series had failed to find anyone who would pick it up and all efforts in this direction had ceased. The next day, Ackles confirmed the news and blamed the network shift as well as the 2023 Writers Guild of America strike.

=== Filming ===
Filming for the pilot episode began in April 2022 throughout New Orleans. Principal photography for the rest of the series began in New Orleans on July 25, and concluded on December 15.

=== Lawsuit ===
On August 31, 2023, a crew member filed a lawsuit against the production, The CW and Warner Brothers for ignoring safety measures. The suit claims the crew was told to continue filming despite lightning occurring in the area and safety measures requiring a production to temporarily stop if lightning is detected within a 6 mile radius. The crew member was soon struck by lightning.

== Reception ==
=== Critical response ===
On the review aggregator website Rotten Tomatoes, 100% of 8 critic reviews for The Winchesters are positive, with an average rating of 6.9/10. On Metacritic, it has a score of 49 out of 100 based on 6 critics, indicating "mixed or average reviews".

=== Ratings ===
The Winchesters had the most-watched series debut during the 2022–23 season for The CW. It was also the most-viewed premiere for the season.

Viewership and ratings per episode of The Winchesters
No.	Title	Air date	Rating (18–49)	Viewers (millions)	DVR (18–49)	DVR viewers (millions)	Total (18–49)	Total viewers (millions)
1	"Pilot"	October 11, 2022	0.1	0.78	0.1	0.51	0.2	1.29
2	"Teach Your Children Well"	October 18, 2022	0.1	0.46	0.1	0.43	0.2	0.89
3	"You're Lost Little Girl"	October 25, 2022	0.1	0.55	0.1	0.32	0.2	0.87
4	"Masters of War"	November 1, 2022	0.1	0.57	0.1	0.36	0.2	0.93
5	"Legend of a Mind"	November 15, 2022	0.1	0.46	0.1	0.38	0.2	0.83
6	"Art of Dying"	November 22, 2022	0.1	0.50	—N/a	—N/a	—N/a	—N/a
7	"Reflections"	December 6, 2022	0.1	0.41	—N/a	—N/a	—N/a	—N/a
8	"Hang on to Your Life"	January 24, 2023	0.1	0.37	—N/a	—N/a	—N/a	—N/a
9	"Cast Your Fate to the Wind"	January 31, 2023	0.1	0.35	—N/a	—N/a	—N/a	—N/a
10	"Suspicious Minds"	February 7, 2023	0.0	0.29	—N/a	—N/a	—N/a	—N/a
11	"You've Got a Friend"	February 21, 2023	0.1	0.36	—N/a	—N/a	—N/a	—N/a
12	"The Tears of a Clown"	February 28, 2023	0.1	0.49	—N/a	—N/a	—N/a	—N/a
13	"Hey, That's No Way to Say Goodbye"	March 7, 2023	0.1	0.44	—N/a	—N/a	—N/a	—N/a
