= Maniesh Paul =

Indian actor and anchor (born 1981)

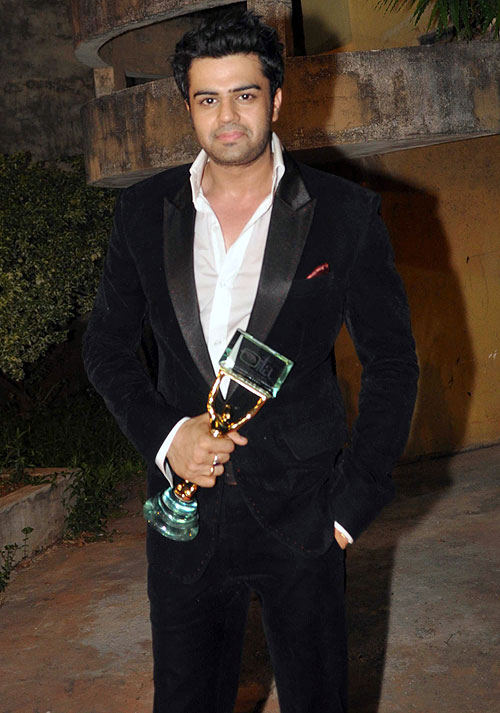
- Paul at the Indian Television Academy Awards in 2012
- Born: 3 August 1981 (age 45); New Delhi, India
- Occupations: Actor; Model; Comedian; Singer; Television presenter; Anchor
- Years active: 2005–present
- Spouse: Sanyukta Paul (m. 2007)

Maniesh Paul (born 3 August 1981) is an Indian actor, tv host, anchor, model and singer. Starting his career as an RJ and VJ, he moved to acting before taking up stand-up comedy and hosting. Paul is recognized as one of the most prominent television anchors and hosts of his generation, celebrated for his charisma, versatility, and engaging presentation style.

== Early life and background ==
Paul was born and brought up in New Delhi to a Punjabi family originally from Sialkot, Pakistan to Delhi, involved in the financial business. He did his schooling from Apeejay School, Sheikh Sarai New Delhi. After his schooling, he did his B.A. in Tourism from College of Vocational Studies, Delhi University. Then he lived with his grandmother in Chembur, Mumbai.

== Career ==
=== Early career ===
Paul started his career in Delhi, as a host, compering cultural events in schools and colleges. Later he shifted to Mumbai, where his first break was hosting Sunday Tango on Star Plus in 2002. He also remained a VJ with Zee Music, and a radio jockey with Radio City's morning drive time show Kasakai Mumbai.

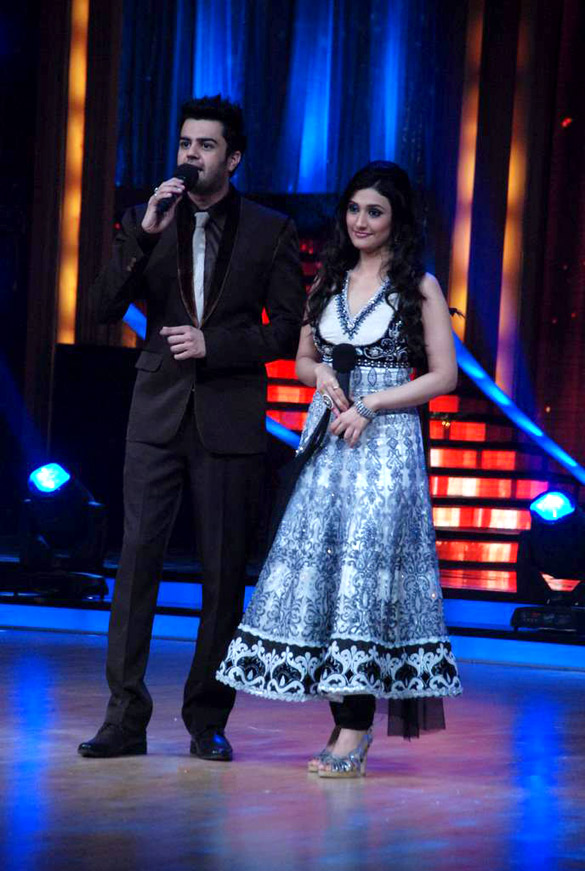
Maniesh Paul and Ragini Khanna hosting Jhalak Dikhhla Jaa 5, 2012.

=== Acting career ===
Later he entered channel STAR One's Ghost Bana Dost to play the role of a ghost. Paul has acted in many serials such as Radhaa Ki Betiyaan Kuch Kar Dikhayengi on NDTV Imagine, Zindadil on ZeeNext, Ssshhhh...Phir Koi Hai on Star One, Wheel Ghar Ghar Mein and Kahani Shuru with Love Guru on Zee TV and Kuchh Cook Hota Hai on 9X. However, finding it unsatisfying, he quit daily soaps and was even out of work for eight months in 2008.

Though he had appeared in cameo roles such as in the Akshay Kumar and Katrina Kaif-starrer Tees Maar Khan (2010), Paul made his debut in a lead role of the computer geek Mickey in Mickey Virus (2013) which received a lot of appreciation.

=== Television host and presenter ===
Subsequently, Paul started his career as a television host and presenter, and gained recognition after hosting Saa Ree Gaa Maa Paa Chhote Ustaad, and later also appeared in the stand-up comedy series Comedy Circus. He also hosted Dance India Dance Li'l Masters on Zee TV. He also participated in Star Ya Rockstar, a celebrity singing show on Zee TV, and co-hosted the celebrity dance-reality competition Jhalak Dikhhla Jaa 7 on Colors TV with Ranvir Shorey. He was also the host of Science of Stupid (IND) version.

In 2011, Paul won the Best Anchor award for Zee TV's Dance India Dance Li'l Masters.

Paul has also hosted Science of Stupid on National Geographic. Over the years, Paul has hosted numerous award shows. In 2018, he hosted Sony TV's Indian Idol 10. Next, he hosted Star Plus's Nach Baliye 9.He is currently hosting discovery plus show History Hunter.

== Personal life ==
He is married to Sanyukta Paul (m. 2007), who is a Bengali. They met each other in their school and started dating in late 1998. Soon, their families got to know each other and they finally got married in 2007. They have a daughter born in 2011 and a son born in 2016.

== Television ==
Year	Title	Role
2005/07	Hero - Bhakti Hi Shakti Hai	Azgar
2007	Chhoona Hai Aasmaan	Farhaan Zaidi
2007	Zindadil	Host
2008	Radhaa Ki Betiyaan Kuch Kar Dikhayeng	Karan
2008	Khooni Saaya	Prem
2008	Kaali Chudail	Prashant
2008	Honeymoon Hotel	Raj
2008	Guest House	Sidharth
2008	Ghost Bana Dost	Ghost
2009	Ghar Ghar Mein	Host
2009	Kuch Kook Hota Hai	Mannu
2010	Dance India Dance Li'l Masters	Host
2010	Sa Re Ga Ma Pa Singing Superstar	Host
2010	Comedy Circus Ka Jadoo	Host
2010	Kiski Daal Galegi	Host
2011	Pyaar Mein Twist	Amol
2011	Dance Ke Superstars	Host
2011	Star Ya Rockstar	Contestant
2012	Jhalak Dikhhla Jaa 5	Host
2012	India's Got Talent	Host
2013	Jhalak Dikhhla Jaa 6	Host
2014	Mad in India	Host
2014	Jhalak Dikhhla Jaa 7	Host
2014	Science of Stupid	Host
2015	Brain Boosters	Host
2015	Jhalak Dikhhla Jaa 8	Host
2016	Jhalak Dikhhla Jaa 9	Host
2016	Science of Stupid 3	Host
2018	Indian Idol	Host
2019	Nach Baliye 9	Host
2019	Movie Masti with Manish Paul	Host
2020	Mujhse Shaadi Karoge	Host
2020	Sa Re Ga Ma Pa Li'l Champs 2020	Host
2020	Beat The Genius	Host
2021	India's Best Dancer 2	Host
2022	Smart Jodi	Host
2022	Jhalak Dikhhla Jaa 10	Host

== Filmography ==
Key
†	Denotes films that have not yet been released

Year	Title	Role	Notes
2009	Maruti Mera Dost	Varun	Special appearance
2010	Tees Maar Khan	Master India	Special appearance
2013	ABCD: Any Body Can Dance	Himself	Special appearance
2013	Mickey Virus	Mickey Arora	Bollywood debut
2015	Ranbanka	Rahul Sharma	
2016	Tere Bin Laden: Dead or Alive	Sharma	
2017	Hrudayantar	Himself	Special appearance, Marathi movie
2018	Baa Baaa Black Sheep	Baba	
2019	Banjar	Jaswant	
2022	Jugjugg Jeeyo	Gurpreet Sharma	
2023	Rafuchakkar	Pawan Kumar	
2025	Sunny Sanskari Ki Tulsi Kumari	Kuku	
2026	Hai Jawani Toh Ishq Hona Hai	Kunnu	
2026	The Vvaan: Force of the Forrest	Ved Prakash aka VP	

== Awards and nominations ==
Year	Film	Award	Category	Result
2023	Jugjugg Jeeyo	Zee Cine Awards	Best Actor in a Comic Role	Won
2023	Jugjugg Jeeyo	Filmfare Awards	Best Supporting Actor	Nominated

== Discography ==
Year	Title	Singer	Music	Lyrics	Label
2018	Harjai	Himself	Sachin Gupta		T-Series

== Events and awards nights ==
Year	Event	Role	Channel
2008	GR8 Awards	Host	Sony TV
2008–2009	Mumbai Police Show Organised by Cineyug	Host	Sony TV
2009–2010	Zee Rishtey Awards	Host	Zee TV
2009–2010	Zee Gold Awards	Host	Zee TV
2010	Zee Diwali Dhamaka	Host	Zee TV
2010	Sahara India Pariwar	Host	Star Plus
2011	BIG Star Entertainment Awards	Host	Star Plus
2010	Indian Telly Awards	Host	Colors TV
2010	Indian Television Academy Awards	Host	Colors TV
2011	Femina Miss India	Host	Sony TV
2012	STAR Parivaar Awards	Host	Star Plus
2012	Femina Miss India	Host	Sony TV
2012	Indian Telly Awards	Host	Colors TV
2012	Golden Petal Awards	Host	Colors TV
2012	BIG Star Entertainment Awards	Host	Star Plus
2021	Opening Ceremony of International Film Festival of India	Host	DD India and DD National
2022	Femina Miss India	Host	Colors TV
