= Tom Papa =

American comedian and actor

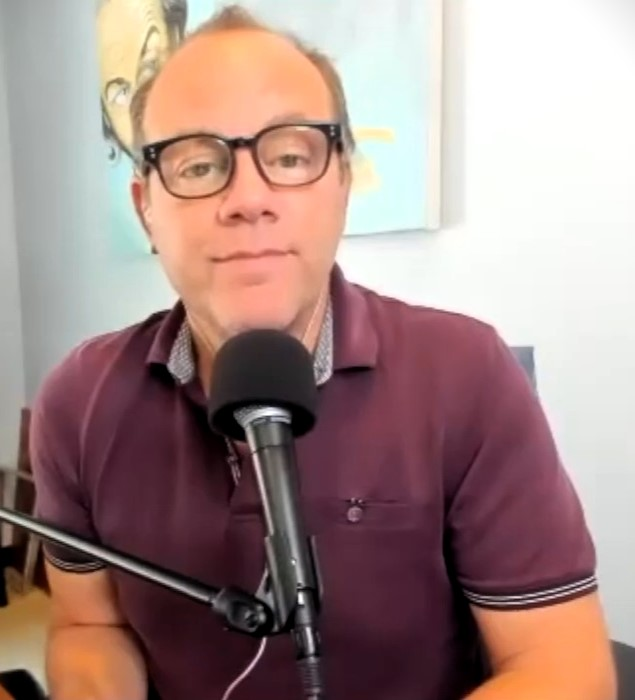
- Papa interviewed in 2021
- Born: November 10, 1968 (age 58); Passaic, New Jersey, U.S.
- Occupations: Comedian, actor, producer, writer, TV/radio host
- Years active: 1993–present
- Spouse: Cynthia Koury (m. 2000)
- Children: 2

Thomas Papa Jr. (born November 10, 1968) is an American comedian, actor, and radio host. He hosts the Sirius XM Satellite Radio show Come to Papa and, in July 2019, he and Fortune Feimster started hosting the Sirius XM show What a Joke with Papa and Fortune. Papa hosted the show Baked on the Food Network and was the head writer and a performer on the radio variety show Live from Here, hosted by Chris Thile, where he delivered the "Out In America" segment.

== Early life ==
Papa was born in Passaic, New Jersey, to Elaine and Thomas Papa, an Italian-American, and grew up in Park Ridge, New Jersey, and later Woodcliff Lake, New Jersey, where he graduated from Pascack Hills High School in 1986. He is a graduate of Rider College. He has two daughters, Charlotte Papa and Angelina Papa; and two sisters, one of whom works at the non-profit organization, City Green. Papa played football and ran track while younger.

== Career ==
=== Stand-up comedy ===
He began in New York City in 1993 playing open mics and hosting at the Stand Up New York comedy club. He toured with Jerry Seinfeld after meeting him at the Comedy Cellar in New York. In 2005 he released his debut comedy album Calm, Cool, & Collected. His successful one-man show Only Human opened at the Montreal Just for Laughs Comedy Festival.

He has recorded seven stand-up specials. Live in New York City and Freaked Out were directed by Rob Zombie. His fourth special, Human Mule, aired December 2016. All of his specials stream on Hulu, Amazon and Netflix. Papa has appeared multiple times on The Tonight Show with Jay Leno, Late Show with David Letterman, and The Joe Rogan Experience.

=== Radio ===
Papa hosts the Sirius XM Satellite Radio show Come to Papa, with other comedians occasionally serving as guest hosts. In July 2019, Papa and Fortune Feimster started hosting What a Joke with Papa and Fortune, interviewing comedians and other celebrities, the first live programming on the Sirius XM station Netflix is a Joke.

Papa writes and performs the monthly Come to Papa Live, a version of a classic radio play combined with standup, music, and sketches. Come to Papa Live is alternately hosted between The Village Underground in New York and Largo in Los Angeles. Guests on Come to Papa Live have included Matt Damon, Sarah Silverman, Joel McHale, Andy Richter, and Jim Gaffigan. Tom first appeared as a panelist on NPR's Wait Wait... Don't Tell Me! on June 30, 2018. He appeared as the guest for The Official Podcast on YouTube on August 30, 2018. After Chris Thile took over A Prairie Home Companion from Garrison Keillor, Papa was a key contributor to the show, now renamed Live From Here, that included the regular segment "Out in America with Tom Papa". He worked behind the scenes as head writer. Papa's catchphrase is "Have you ever...? I have!"

=== TV and film ===
In 2004, Papa co-created and started in Come to Papa, playing an aspiring comedy writer working as a reporter for a large newspaper in New Jersey. The show was cancelled after airing only four episodes due to poor reviews, allowing Steve Carell to take up the role of Michael Scott in The Office.

Papa had a recurring role as Luff in the HBO and Cinemax series The Knick, starring Clive Owen. He appeared in Chris Rock's movie Top Five, and starred as Ray Arnett alongside Michael Douglas and Matt Damon in Behind the Candelabra, which aired on HBO on May 26, 2013. That was his second film with director Steven Soderbergh.

Papa played opposite Matt Damon in Soderbergh's 2009 film The Informant! He also played the title character of El Superbeasto and starred opposite Paul Giamatti in the Rob Zombie animated feature The Haunted World of El Superbeasto. He played himself in Comedian, and lent his voice to the animated feature Bee Movie.

In 2010, Papa hosted NBC's The Marriage Ref, which ran for two seasons.

Papa's other TV appearances include Inside Amy Schumer, The Jim Gaffigan Show, a recurring role on The New Adventures of Old Christine, hosting the FOX show Boom! which aired in summer 2015, VH1's I Love the '70s, I Love the '80s, and I Love the '90s series, National Geographic Channel's US version of the British game show Duck Quacks Don't Echo.

In 2020, Papa appeared in an hour long comedy special for Netflix entitled You're Doing Great! and published a book of the same name.

== Filmography ==
=== Film ===
- Analyze That (2002)
- Comedian (2002)
- The Life Coach (2005)
- Bee Movie (2007)
- The Haunted World of El Superbeasto (2009) (also writer)
- The Informant! (2009)
- Behind the Candelabra (2013)
- Top Five (2014)
- 3 from Hell (2019)
- Paper Spiders (2021)
- Air (2023)
- Misty Green (2026)

=== TV ===
- Comedy Central Presents (2001 and 2007)
- Tough Crowd with Colin Quinn (200+ episodes, 2002)
- Come to Papa (4 episodes, 2004)
- The New Adventures of Old Christine (2 episodes, 2008)
- The Marriage Ref (2010)
- The Tonight Show with Jay Leno
- The Nightly Show with Larry Wilmore
- Late Night with David Letterman
- Late Night with Conan O'Brien
- Jimmy Kimmel Live!
- Behind the Candelabra (2013)
- Duck Quacks Don't Echo (2014)
- Human Mule (EPIX special) (2016)
- Tosh 2.0 (2016)
- Inside Amy Schumer (2015)
- The Jim Gaffigan Show (2015)
- The Knick (US TV series) (2014–)
- Boom! (2015)
- The Late Show with Stephen Colbert (2016)
- Baked with Tom Papa (2018–)
- You're Doing Great! (Netflix special) (2020)
- What A Day! (Netflix special) (2022)
- Home Free (Netflix special) (2024)

=== Podcasts ===
- Breaking Bread with Tom Papa (2020-)
- Come To Papa (2013–2020)
- The Official Podcast (2018)

== Specials ==
- Calm, Cool, & Collected (BSeenMedia, 2005)
- Tom Papa: Live in New York City (Comedy Central Records, 2012)
- Freaked Out (2013)
- Human Mule (2016)
- You're Doing Great! (2020)
- What A Day! (2022)
- Home Free (2024)
