= Come to Papa (TV series) =

American sitcom (2004)

- Genre: Sitcom
- Created by: Greg Malins; Tom Papa
- Starring: Tom Papa; Jennifer Aspen; Steve Carell; Rob Benedict
- Composer: Steven Cahill
- Country of origin: United States
- Original language: English
- No. of seasons: 1
- No. of episodes: 4

Production
- Camera setup: Multi-camera
- Running time: 30 minutes
- Production companies: Stan Allen Productions; NBC Studios; Warner Bros. Television

Original release
- Network: NBC
- Release: June 3 – June 24, 2004

Come to Papa is an American sitcom that aired on NBC from June 3 until June 24, 2004.

== Premise ==
An aspiring comedy writer works as a reporter for a large newspaper in New Jersey.

== Cast ==
- Tom Papa as Tom Papa
- Jennifer Aspen as Karen
- Steve Carell as Blevin
- Rob Benedict as Judah
- John Salley as Mailman
- Jayden Lund as Mark

== Episodes ==
Every episode of the series was written by Greg Malins and Tom Papa and directed by Andy Ackerman.

No.	Title	Original release date	Prod. code	Viewers (millions)
1	"The Tire Guy"	June 3, 2004	004	6.8
Tom writes jokes for an ad campaign by a tire salesman called Crazy Benny. Blevin offends a coffee girl.
2	"The Pep Talk"	June 10, 2004	002	5.5
Tom helps a baseball team with a pep talk and ends up with mixed results.
3	"The Salad"	June 17, 2004	003	4.3
Tom saves the life of an eccentric millionaire.
4	"The Crush"	June 24, 2004	001	5.3
Tom meddles in the love life of a friend of his wife.
