= The Way, Way Back (soundtrack) =

2013 film soundtrack albums

The Way, Way Back (Music from the Motion Picture)

Soundtrack album by various artists
- Released: July 2, 2013
- Length: 56:58
- Label: Columbia

The Way, Way Back (Original Motion Picture Score)

Film score by Rob Simonsen
- Released: July 16, 2013
- Recorded: 2013
- Genre: Film score
- Length: 23:58
- Label: Columbia
- Producer: Rob Simonsen

Rob Simonsen chronology
The English Teacher (2013)	The Way, Way Back (2013)	Girl Most Likely (2013)

The Way, Way Back (Music from the Motion Picture) and The Way, Way Back (Original Motion Picture Score) are the two albums for the 2013 film The Way, Way Back directed by Nat Faxon and Jim Rash. The first album was released on July 2, 2013, featured songs as heard in the film while the second album consisted of the original score composed by Rob Simonsen, which released on July 16. Both albums were distributed by Columbia Records.

== Background ==
=== Original score ===
Rob Simonsen composed the film score for The Way, Way Back. Having impressed by the coming-of-age films from John Hughes and Cameron Crowe, he liked the idea of a young teenage boy going through puberty and how Duncan's character felt reminiscent of his past. He added that Duncan had a soul which was hidden, and as a shy, introverted person, he wanted Duncan to have a theme that would thread throghout the film and grow.

Duncan's theme featured quirky instruments that was reminiscent of his character, but also tender and have a soul. Hence, he wanted the approach of the score to pinpoint something internal in Duncan, but cannot be seen on screen. The music mapped out the hidden landscape that blossoms for the character throughout the film. For the film, he used a muted piano, regular piano, along with an M-20 natural acoustic guitar, as well as bass, drums, organ and lap seel. Despite not using synths predominantly, except for few cues, he utilized a lap steel to provide the connective tissue that often is done with synth pads, in order to provide the simple, humble and organic score with quirkiness.

Simonsen added that the stereo mixing of the film was a bit narrower, as he denied of a 5.1 surround sound for the music, and the film's surround music places the music a bit more front and center, as well as conservative, reflecting the more conservative world and situation.

=== Licensed songs ===
Linda Cohen served as the music supervisor. The music budget was much higher than the production cost as Faxon and Rash, ensured that the film should have a cross-section of music that represents the characters, as well as a modern musical stuff for the water park, which Owen would live. He wanted the music to have a timeless feeling evolving from generations. The music selection served as the collective effort from both Faxon, Rash and Cohen, and two songs from Trampled by Turtles and The Apache Relay featured in the film. Faxon then provided some help from his father-in-law and drummer Steve Gadd, who knew several artists, including Edie Brickell, for whom he played on concerts. Brickell, who watched the film and liking it, had sent few songs ideas, which fit the film very well. The song "Can't Fight This Feeling" by REO Speedwagon was not included in the soundtrack, despite being featured in the film.

== Reception ==
Heather Phares of AllMusic summarized that "While the collection isn't as consistent as the soundtracks to like-minded films such as Juno or Little Miss Sunshine, it still has enough personality to be an entertaining set of songs". Padraig Cotter of Screen Rant described it "a mixtape of great music" providing the feel of the 1980s era. Hanna Kielar of Impact 89FM called it a "dazzling soundtrack".

Betsy Sharkey of Los Angeles Times wrote "Rob Simonsen's infectious original score, with Linda Cohen supervising, gives the movie that seductive summer-on-the-shore vibe that helps in riding out the storms." Kevin Kwong of South China Morning Post called it "a beautiful score by Rob Simonsen, which helps move the narrative along".

== Track listing ==
The Way, Way Back (Music from the Motion Picture)
No.	Title	Artist(s)	Length
1.	"For The Time Being"	Edie Brickell and the Gaddabouts	3:28
2.	"Kyrie"	Mr. Mister	4:24
3.	"Out The Door"	Ben Kweller	3:41
4.	"Come and See"	Young Galaxy	3:59
5.	"Running Wild"	Army Navy	3:22
6.	"Young Blood"	UFO	3:03
7.	"Shine"	Wild Belle	4:41
8.	"New Sensation"	INXS	3:40
9.	"Sneakin' Sally Through the Alley"	Robert Palmer	4:24
10.	"Young At Heart"	Tim Myers feat. the Rondo Brothers	3:39
11.	"Recess"	Eli "Paperboy" Reed	3:21
12.	"Power Hungry Animals"	The Apache Relay	2:52
13.	"Alone"	Trampled by Turtles	4:26
14.	"Go Where The Love Is"	Edie Brickell and The Gaddabouts	4:52
15.	"The Way Way Back"	Rob Simonsen	3:06
Total length:			56:58

The Way, Way Back (Original Motion Picture Score)
No.	Title	Length
1.	"Duncan's Theme"	1:57
2.	"Escaping Dinner"	1:09
3.	"They Drank All The Beer"	1:19
4.	"Lifejacket"	0:42
5.	"Because You're With Me"	1:15
6.	"Sweet Ride"	1:05
7.	"Staying Outside"	1:19
8.	"Ghost Crabs"	2:20
9.	"Raindyland"	0:48
10.	"Susanna Investigates"	1:33
11.	"Return To Your Ladyfriend"	2:05
12.	"Post Fight"	2:12
13.	"He Said I Was A 3"	1:52
14.	"Pop n Lock Passes Owen"	1:23
15.	"The Way Way Back"	2:59
Total length:		23:58

== Accolades ==
Award	Date of ceremony	Category	Result	Ref(s)
World Soundtrack Awards	October 19, 2013	Discovery of the Year	Nominated (Note: also for The Spectacular Now)	
