= Sam Rockwell on screen and stage =

Filmography and performances of American actor Sam Rockwell

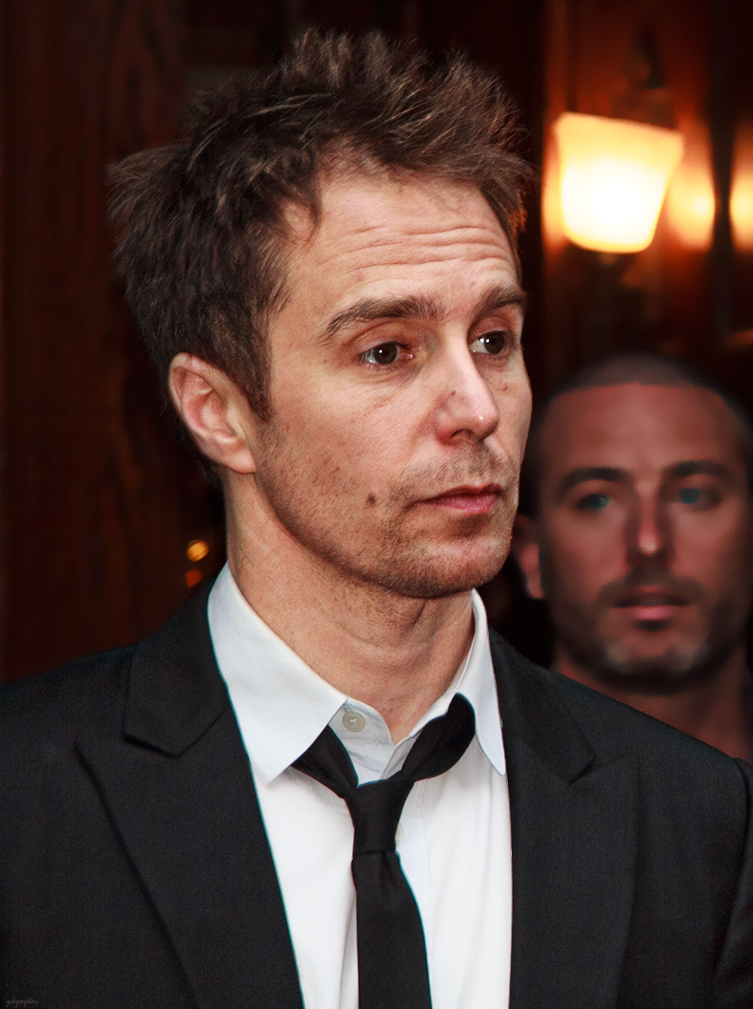
Rockwell in 2012 at TIFF

Sam Rockwell is an American actor. He is known for his roles on stage and screen and has earned various accolades. After making his film debut in 1989, he established himself as a memorable character actor before gaining a reputation in Hollywood which led him to leading man roles.

Rockwell made his film debut in the slasher film Clownhouse (1989). He then earned acclaim for his roles in the British drama Lawn Dogs (1997), the prison drama The Green Mile (1999), the satirical space comedy Galaxy Quest (1999), the comedy Charlie's Angels (2000), the biographical spy film Confessions of a Dangerous Mind (2002), the black comedy crime film Matchstick Men (2003), the space comedy The Hitchhiker's Guide to the Galaxy (2005), the revisionist western The Assassination of Jesse James by the Coward Robert Ford (2007), the political drama Frost/Nixon (2008), and the space drama Moon (2009). He continued to earn acclaim in the drama Conviction (2010), the black comedy Seven Psychopaths (2012), the coming of age comedy The Way, Way Back (2013), the black comedy Jojo Rabbit (2019), and the biographical drama Richard Jewell (2019).

For his role as a hot headed racist cop in the Martin McDonagh drama Three Billboards Outside Ebbing, Missouri (2017), he earned both the Academy Award and the BAFTA Award. He was Oscar-nominated for his role as George W. Bush in the political satire Vice (2018). He is also known for his role as Justin Hammer in the Marvel Cinematic Universe film Iron Man 2 (2010) and a doctor in the science-fiction western Cowboys & Aliens (2011). He has voiced roles in the animated films G-Force (2009), The Bad Guys (2022) as well its sequel (2025).

On television, he portrayed Bob Fosse in the FX on Hulu limited series Fosse/Verdon (2019) and a man struggling with his identity in the third season of The White Lotus (2025) both of which earned him Primetime Emmy Award nominations. On stage, he has starred as an explosive hustler in the Broadway revival of the David Mamet play American Buffalo (2022), earning him a Tony Award for Best Actor in a Play nomination.

== Acting credits ==
=== Film ===
Year	Title	Role	Notes	Ref.
1989	Clownhouse	Randy		
1990	Teenage Mutant Ninja Turtles	Head Thug		
1991	Strictly Business	Gary		
1992	Jack and His Friends	Louie		
1992	In the Soup	Pauli		
1992	Light Sleeper	Jealous		
1992	Happy Hell Night	Young Henry Collins		
1994	Somebody to Love	Polish Guy		
1994	The Search for One-eye Jimmy	Jimmy "One-eye Jimmy" Hoyt		
1995	Drunks	Tony		
1995	Glory Daze	Rob		
1995	Mercy	Matty		
1996	Bad Liver and a Broken Heart	Broken Heart	Short film	
1996	Basquiat	Thug		
1996	Box of Moonlight	The Kid a.k.a. Bucky		
1997	Arresting Gena	Sonny		
1997	Lawn Dogs	Trent Burns		
1998	The Call Back	Alan / Christopher Walken		
1998	Jerry and Tom	Jerry		
1998	Louis & Frank	Sam		
1998	Safe Men	Sam		
1998	Celebrity	Brandon Darrow's Entourage		
1999	A Midsummer Night's Dream	Francis Flute		
1999	The Green Mile	William "Wild Bill" Wharton		
1999	Galaxy Quest	Guy Fleegman		
2000	Charlie's Angels	Eric Knox		
2001	D.C. Smalls	Karaoke Singer	Short film	
2001	Pretzel	Sam	Short film	
2001	BigLove	Nate	Short film	
2001	Made	Hotel Clerk	Uncredited	
2001	Heist	Jimmy Silk		
2002	13 Moons	Rick		
2002	Running Time	The Hunted	Short film	
2002	Welcome to Collinwood	Pero "Pepe" Mahalovic		
2002	Confessions of a Dangerous Mind	Chuck Barris		
2002	Stella Shorts 1998–2002	Pizza Guy	Direct-to-video; Short: "Bored"	
2003	Matchstick Men	Frank Mercer		
2004	Piccadilly Jim	Jim Crocker / Piccadilly Jim		
2005	The Hitchhiker's Guide to the Galaxy	Zaphod Beeblebrox		
2005	The F Word	Jeremy		
2005	Robin's Big Date	The Bat-Man	Short film	
2007	Joshua	Brad Cairn		
2007	Snow Angels	Glenn Marchand		
2007	The Assassination of Jesse James by the Coward Robert Ford	Charley Ford		
2008	Woman in Burka	Sam	Short film	
2008	Choke	Victor Mancini		
2008	Frost/Nixon	James Reston Jr.		
2009	The Winning Season	Bill Greaves		
2009	Moon	Sam Bell		
2009	G-Force	Darwin	Voice	
2009	Gentlemen Broncos	Bronco / Brutus		
2009	Everybody's Fine	Robert Goode		
2010	Iron Man 2	Justin Hammer		
2010	F—K	Sam	Short film	
2010	Conviction	Kenneth Waters		
2011	Cowboys & Aliens	Doc		
2011	The Sitter	Karl Fairhurst		
2012	Seven Psychopaths	Billy Bickle		
2013	The Way, Way Back	Owen		
2013	A Single Shot	John Moon		
2013	Trust Me	Aldo Stankas		
2013	A Case of You	Gary		
2014	Better Living Through Chemistry	Douglas Varney		
2014	All Hail the King	Justin Hammer	Short film	
2014	Laggies	Craig Hunter		
2014	Loitering with Intent	Wayne		
2015	Digging for Fire	Ray		
2015	Don Verdean	Don Verdean		
2015	Poltergeist	Eric Bowen		
2015	Mr. Right	Francis Munch / Mr. Right		
2017	Axis	Himself	Voice	
2017	The Dark of Night	Officer Witt	Short film	
2017	Three Billboards Outside Ebbing, Missouri	Officer Jason Dixon	Academy Award for Best Supporting Actor	
2017	Woman Walks Ahead	Colonel Silas Grove		
2018	Blaze	Oilman #1		
2018	Mute	Sam Bell	Uncredited cameo	
2018	Blue Iguana	Eddie		
2018	Vice	George W. Bush		
2019	The Best of Enemies	C. P. Ellis		
2019	Jojo Rabbit	Captain Klenzendorf		
2019	Richard Jewell	Watson Bryant		
2020	Trolls World Tour	Hickory	Voice	
2020	The One and Only Ivan	Ivan	Voice	
2022	The Bad Guys	Mr. Wolf	Voice	
2022	See How They Run	Inspector Stoppard		
2024	Argylle	Aidan Wilde		
2024	IF	Guardian Dog	Voice	
2025	The Bad Guys 2	Mr. Wolf	Voice	
2025	Good Luck, Have Fun, Don't Die	Man from the future		
2026	Wild Horse Nine	Lee Chesterfield		
2026	Ray Gunn	Raymond Gunn	Voice	
2027	The Semant Movie †	The Semant (Voice)	Voice appearance	
TBA	Stuntnuts: The Movie †	Himself	Post-production	
TBA	Tumor †	Frank Armstrong	Post-production	
TBA	The Adventures of Drunky †	Drunky	Voice; in production	
TBA	The Cackling of the Dodos †	TBA	Filming	

=== Television ===
Year	Title	Role	Notes	Ref.
1988	The Equalizer	Slick	Episode: "The Child Broker"	
1989	Dream Street	Joey	Episode: "Girl's Talk"	
1990	ABC Afterschool Special	Jason	Episode: "Over the Limit"	
1992	Law & Order	Randy Borland	Episode: "Intolerance"	
1993	Law & Order	Officer Weddeker	Episode: "Manhood"	
1993	Lifestories: Families in Crisis	Kevin Tunell	Episode: "Dead Drunk: The Kevin Tunell Story"	
1995	NYPD Blue	Billy	Episode: "Torah! Torah! Torah!"	
1997	Subway Stories	Man Eating	Television film	
1997	Prince Street	Donny Hanson	6 episodes	
2005	Stella	Gary Meadows	Episode: "Office Party"	
2011	Gettysburg	Narrator	Voice; Documentary	
2012	Napoleon Dynamite	Filson	Voice; Episode: "FFA"	
2015	Drunk History	Bugsy Siegel	Episode: "Las Vegas"	
2015–2021	F Is for Family	Vic Reynolds	Voice; 44 episodes	
2016	Inside Amy Schumer	Sam	Episode: "Fame"	
2018	Saturday Night Live	Himself (host)	Episode: "Sam Rockwell/Halsey"	
2019	Fosse/Verdon	Bob Fosse	8 episodes, also executive producer	
2020	Home Movie: The Princess Bride	Westley	Episode: "Chapter Five: Life Is Pain"	
2022	The Last Movie Stars	Stuart Rosenberg	Voice; 6 episode docuseries	
2023	What If...?	Justin Hammer	Voice; Episode: "What If... Happy Hogan Saved Christmas?"	
2025	The White Lotus	Frank	4 episodes	

=== Theatre ===
Year	Title	Role	Playwright	Venue	Ref.
1998–1999	Goose-Pimples	Vernon	Mike Leigh	Theatre Row, Off-Broadway	
2000	The Hot l Baltimore	Bill Lewis	Lanford Wilson	Williamstown Theatre Festival	
2001	Zoo Story	Jerry	Edward Albee	Williamstown Theatre Festival	
2001	The Dumb Waiter	Gus	Harold Pinter	Williamstown Theatre Festival	
2005	The Last Days of Judas Iscariot	Judas Iscariot	Stephen Adly Guirgis	The Public Theater, Off-Broadway	
2010	A Behanding in Spokane	Mervyn	Martin McDonagh	Gerald Schoenfeld Theatre, Broadway	
2011	A Streetcar Named Desire	Stanley Kowalski	Tennessee Williams	Williamstown Theatre Festival	
2014	Fool for Love	Eddie	Sam Shepard	Williamstown Theatre Festival	
2015	Fool for Love	Eddie	Sam Shepard	Samuel J. Friedman Theatre, Broadway	
2022	American Buffalo	Teach	David Mamet	Circle in the Square Theatre, Broadway	
2026	A View from the Bridge	Eddie Carbone	Arthur Miller	Ellen Stewart Theatre, Off-Broadway	

== Music videos ==
Year	Title	Artist(s)	Role	Ref.
2015	"Down to Earth"	Flight Facilities	Himself	
2024	"Electric Energy"	Ariana DeBose, Boy George and Nile Rodgers	Himself	

== Video games ==
Year	Title	Role	Notes	Ref.
2009	G-Force	Darwin	Voice	
2016	Dishonored 2	Mortimer Ramsey	Voice	

== See also ==
- List of awards and nominations received by Sam Rockwell
