= List of awards and nominations received by Sam Rockwell =

Sam Rockwell awards and nominations
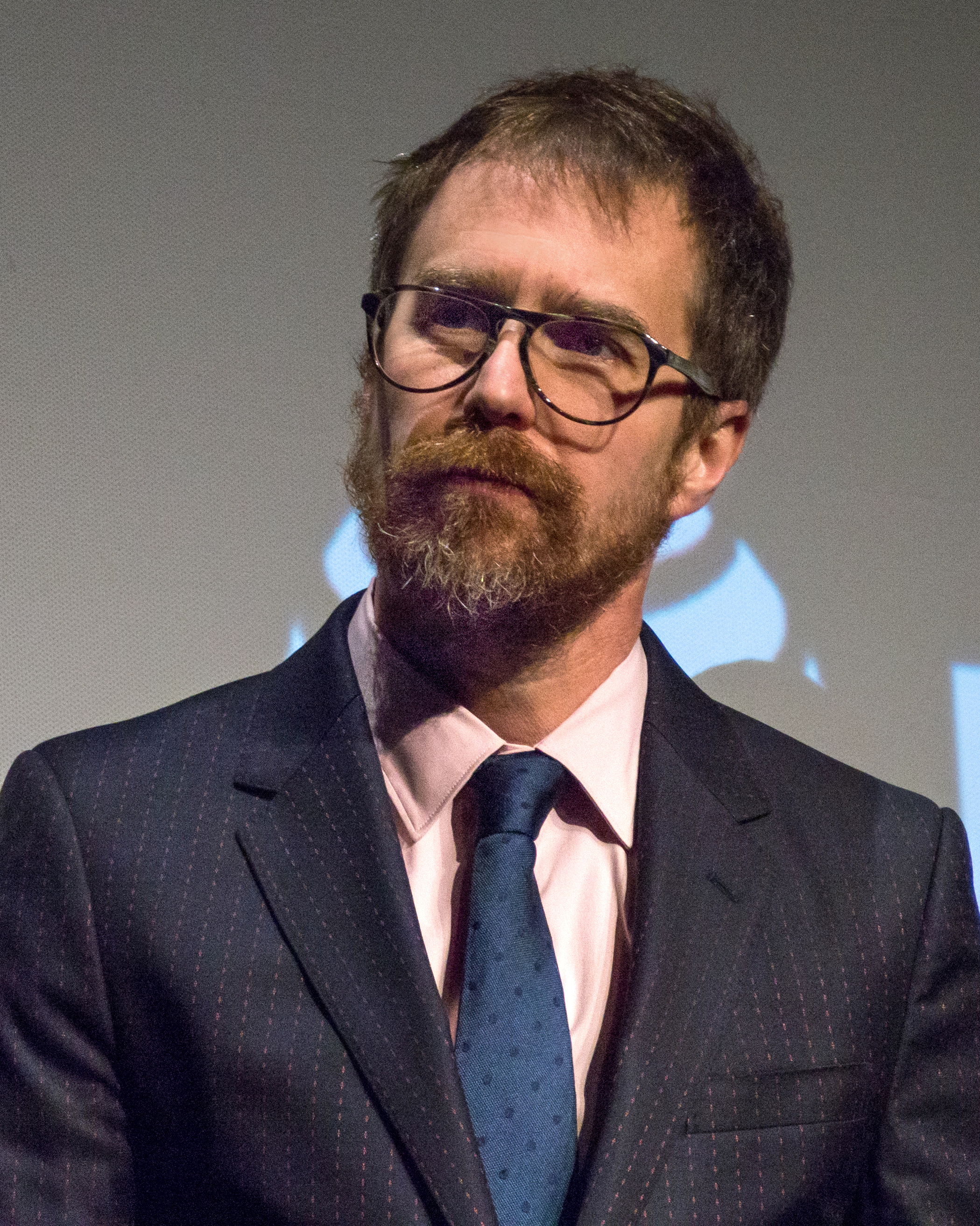
- Rockwell at the 2018 Tribeca Film Festival
Awards and nominations
Award	Wins	Nominations
Academy Awards	1	2
SAG Awards	3	6
BAFTA Awards	1	2
Emmy Awards	0	3
Golden Globes	1	3
Tony Awards	0	1

Totals (Note: Certain award groups do not simply award one winner. They acknowledge several different recipients, have runners-up, and have third place. Since this is a specific recognition and is different from losing an award, runner-up mentions are considered wins in this award tally. For simplification and to avoid errors, each award in this list has been presumed to have had a prior nomination.)
- Wins: 43
- Nominations: 112

This article is a List of awards and nominations received by Sam Rockwell.

Sam Rockwell is an American actor known for his roles on stage and screen. Rockwell started his career as a character actor playing diverse supporting roles in a variety of genres before transitioning into leading man roles. He has received several accolades including an Academy Award, a BAFTA Award, a Golden Globe Award and three Actor Awards as well as nominations for three Emmy Awards and a Tony Award.

He acted in the British fantasy drama Lawn Dogs (1997) winning Best Actor Prizes at the Montreal World Film Festival and the Sitges Film Festival. He played a violent and erratic prison inmate William "Wild Bill" Wharton in the fantasy prison drama epic The Green Mile (1999) for which he was nominated for the Actor Award for Outstanding Cast in a Motion Picture. He received acclaim for his portrayal of Chuck Barris in the biographical spy thriller Confessions of a Dangerous Mind (2002) earning the Berlin International Film Festival's Silver Bear for Best Actor. He played James Reston Jr. in the historical political thriller Frost/Nixon (2008) earning an Actor Award nomination with the Cast. He received various award nominations for his role as man with a personal crisis on the far side of the Moon in the science fiction film Moon (2009).

Rockwell was nominated for the Critics' Choice Award playing a man convicted of a crime in the legal drama Conviction (2010), the Independent Spirit Award playing a struggling actor in the satirical crime dramedy Seven Psychopaths (2012), and the Critics' Choice Award playing a quirky water park worker in the summer comedy The Way, Way Back (2013). He played a troubled police deputy in the Martin McDonagh crime-drama Three Billboards Outside Ebbing, Missouri (2017) for which he received the Academy Award for Best Supporting Actor, the BAFTA Award as well as the Critics' Choice Movie Award, the Golden Globe Award, the Independent Spirit Award, and the Actor Award. The following year he portrayed George W. Bush in the Dick Cheney biopic Vice (2018) earning nominations for the Academy Award, BAFTA Award, and Golden Globe Award.

On television, he portrayed the Broadway dancer and choreographer Bob Fosse in the FX limited series Fosse/Verdon (2019) for which he received a Primetime Emmy Award for Outstanding Lead Actor in a Limited or Anthology Series or Movie nomination. He was also nominated as a producer on the same project earning a nomination for the Primetime Emmy Award for Outstanding Limited or Anthology Series. For his role in the HBO anthology series The White Lotus (2024) he was nominated for the Primetime Emmy Award for Outstanding Supporting Actor in a Drama Series. On stage, he earned a Tony Award for Best Actor in a Play nomination for his role as a hustler in the David Mamet revival American Buffalo (2022).

== Major associations ==
=== Academy Awards ===
Year	Category	Nominated work	Result	Ref.
2017	Best Supporting Actor	Three Billboards Outside Ebbing, Missouri	Won	
2018	Best Supporting Actor	Vice	Nominated	

=== Actor Awards ===
Year	Category	Nominated work	Result	Ref.
1999	Outstanding Cast in a Motion Picture	The Green Mile	Nominated	
2008	Outstanding Cast in a Motion Picture	Frost/Nixon	Nominated	
2017	Outstanding Male Actor in a Supporting Role	Three Billboards Outside Ebbing, Missouri	Won	
2017	Outstanding Cast in a Motion Picture	Three Billboards Outside Ebbing, Missouri	Won	
2019	Outstanding Cast in a Motion Picture	Jojo Rabbit	Nominated	
2019	Outstanding Male Actor in a Miniseries or Television Movie	Fosse/Verdon	Won	

=== BAFTA Awards ===
Year	Category	Nominated work	Result	Ref.
British Academy Film Awards
2018	Best Actor in a Supporting Role	Three Billboards Outside Ebbing, Missouri	Won	
2019	Best Actor in a Supporting Role	Vice	Nominated	

=== Critics' Choice Awards ===
Year	Category	Nominated work	Result	Ref.
Critics' Choice Movie Awards
2010	Best Supporting Actor	Conviction	Nominated	
2013	Best Lead Actor in a Comedy	The Way Way Back	Nominated	
2017	Best Acting Ensemble	Three Billboards Outside Ebbing, Missouri	Won	
2017	Best Supporting Actor	Three Billboards Outside Ebbing, Missouri	Won	
2018	Best Acting Ensemble	Vice	Nominated	
Critics' Choice Television Awards
2019	Best Actor in a Limited Series or Television Movie	Fosse/Verdon	Nominated	
Critics' Choice Super Awards
2020	Best Voice Actor in an Animated Movie	The One and Only Ivan	Nominated	
2026	Best Actor in a Science Fiction/Fantasy Movie	Good Luck, Have Fun, Don't Die	Nominated	

=== Emmy Awards ===
Year	Category	Nominated work	Result	Ref.
Primetime Emmy Awards
2019	Outstanding Limited Series	Fosse/Verdon	Nominated	
2019	Outstanding Lead Actor in a Limited Series or Movie	Fosse/Verdon	Nominated	
2025	Outstanding Supporting Actor in a Drama Series	The White Lotus (episode: "Full-Moon Party")	Nominated	

=== Golden Globe Awards ===
Year	Category	Nominated work	Result	Ref.
2018	Best Supporting Actor – Motion Picture	Three Billboards Outside Ebbing, Missouri	Won	
2019	Best Supporting Actor – Motion Picture	Vice	Nominated	
2020	Best Actor in a Miniseries or Motion Picture – Television	Fosse/Verdon	Nominated	

=== Tony Awards ===
Year	Category	Nominated work	Result	Ref.
2022	Best Actor in a Play	American Buffalo	Nominated	

== Critics awards ==
Organizations	Year	Category	Work	Result	Ref.
Austin Film Critics Association	2017	Best Supporting Actor	Three Billboards Outside Ebbing, Missouri	Nominated	
Boston Society of Film Critics	2012	Best Ensemble Cast	Seven Psychopaths	Won	
Boston Society of Film Critics	2017	Best Supporting Actor	Three Billboards Outside Ebbing, Missouri	Nominated	
Central Ohio Film Critics Association	2018	Best Supporting Actor	Three Billboards Outside Ebbing, Missouri	Nominated	
Chicago Film Critics Association	2017	Best Supporting Actor	Three Billboards Outside Ebbing, Missouri	Nominated	
Dallas–Fort Worth Film Critics Association	2017	Best Supporting Actor	Three Billboards Outside Ebbing, Missouri	Won	
Denver Film Critics Society	2018	Best Supporting Actor	Three Billboards Outside Ebbing, Missouri	Nominated	
Detroit Film Critics Society	2009	Best Lead Actor	Moon	Nominated	
Detroit Film Critics Society	2017	Best Supporting Actor	Three Billboards Outside Ebbing, Missouri	Nominated	
Florida Film Critics Circle	2017	Best Supporting Actor	Three Billboards Outside Ebbing, Missouri	Won	
Georgia Film Critics Association	2018	Best Supporting Actor	Three Billboards Outside Ebbing, Missouri	Nominated	
Hawaii Film Critics Society	2018	Best Supporting Actor	Three Billboards Outside Ebbing, Missouri	Won	
Houston Film Critics Society	2018	Best Supporting Actor	Three Billboards Outside Ebbing, Missouri	Won	
Iowa Film Critics	2011	Best Supporting Actor	Conviction	Nominated	
Iowa Film Critics	2018	Best Supporting Actor	Three Billboards Outside Ebbing, Missouri	Nominated	
IndieWire Critics Poll	2017	Best Supporting Actor	Three Billboards Outside Ebbing, Missouri	Nominated	
Las Vegas Film Critics Society	2002	Best Lead Actor	Confession of a Dangerous Mind	Nominated	
Las Vegas Film Critics Society	2017	Best Supporting Actor	Three Billboards Outside Ebbing, Missouri	Won	
London Film Critics' Circle	2018	Best Supporting Actor	Three Billboards Outside Ebbing, Missouri	Nominated	
Los Angeles Film Critics Association	2017	Best Supporting Actor	Three Billboards Outside Ebbing, Missouri	Runner-up	
National Society of Film Critics	2018	Best Supporting Actor	Three Billboards Outside Ebbing, Missouri	Nominated	
Nevada Film Critics Society	2017	Best Supporting Actor	Three Billboards Outside Ebbing, Missouri	Nominated	
North Carolina Film Critics Association	2018	Best Supporting Actor	Three Billboards Outside Ebbing, Missouri	Nominated	
North Texas Film Critics Association	2018	Best Supporting Actor	Three Billboards Outside Ebbing, Missouri	Won	
Oklahoma Film Critics Circle	2018	Best Supporting Actor	Three Billboards Outside Ebbing, Missouri	Nominated	
Online Film Critics Society	2013	Best Supporting Actor	The Way Way Back	Nominated	
Online Film Critics Society	2017	Best Supporting Actor	Three Billboards Outside Ebbing, Missouri	Won	
Outer Critics Circle Awards	2022	Outstanding Actor in a Play	American Buffalo	Nominated	
Palm Springs International Film Festival	2018	Spotlight Award	Three Billboards Outside Ebbing, Missouri	Won	
Phoenix Critics Circle Award	2017	Best Supporting Actor	Three Billboards Outside Ebbing, Missouri	Won	
Phoenix Film Critics Society	2003	Best Lead Actor	Confession of a Dangerous Mind	Won	
Phoenix Film Critics Society	2013	Best Acting Ensemble	The Way Way Back	Nominated	
Phoenix Film Critics Society	2013	Best Supporting Actor	The Way Way Back	Nominated	
Phoenix Film Critics Society	2017	Best Supporting Actor	Three Billboards Outside Ebbing, Missouri	Won	
Phoenix Film Critics Society	2018	Best Supporting Actor	Vice	Nominated	
San Diego Film Critics Society	2012	Best Ensemble Performance	Seven Psychopaths	Nominated	
San Diego Film Critics Society	2013	Best Supporting Actor	The Way Way Back	Nominated	
San Diego Film Critics Society	2017	Best Supporting Actor	Three Billboards Outside Ebbing, Missouri	Won	
San Francisco Film Critics Circle	2017	Best Supporting Actor	Three Billboards Outside Ebbing, Missouri	Nominated	
Seattle Film Critics Society	2017	Best Supporting Actor	Three Billboards Outside Ebbing, Missouri	Nominated	
Southeastern Film Critics Association	2017	Best Supporting Actor	Three Billboards Outside Ebbing, Missouri	Won	
St. Louis Film Critics Association	2010	Best Supporting Actor	Conviction	Nominated	
St. Louis Film Critics Association	2017	Best Supporting Actor	Three Billboards Outside Ebbing, Missouri	Nominated	
Toronto Film Critics Association	2017	Best Supporting Actor	Three Billboards Outside Ebbing, Missouri	Nominated	
Utah Film Critics Association	2010	Best Supporting Actor	Conviction	Nominated	
Utah Film Critics Association	2017	Best Supporting Actor	Three Billboards Outside Ebbing, Missouri	Nominated	
Vancouver Film Critics Circle	2017	Best Supporting Actor	Three Billboards Outside Ebbing, Missouri	Nominated	
Washington D.C. Area Film Critics Association	2010	Best Supporting Actor	Conviction	Nominated	
Washington D.C. Area Film Critics Association	2017	Best Supporting Actor	Three Billboards Outside Ebbing, Missouri	Won	

== Miscellaneous awards ==
Organizations	Year	Category	Work	Result	Ref.
AACTA Awards	2018	Best International Supporting Actor – Cinema	Three Billboards Outside Ebbing, Missouri	Won	
AACTA Awards	2019	Best International Supporting Actor – Cinema	Vice	Nominated	
Alliance of Women Film Journalists	2018	Best Supporting Actor	Three Billboards Outside Ebbing, Missouri	Nominated	
Award Circuit Community Award	1999	Best Cast Ensemble	The Green Mile	Nominated	
Award Circuit Community Award	2017	Best Supporting Actor	Three Billboards Outside Ebbing, Missouri	Won	
Award Circuit Community Award	2017	Best Cast Ensemble	Three Billboards Outside Ebbing, Missouri	Nominated	
Berlin International Film Festival	2003	Silver Bear for Best Actor	Confession of a Dangerous Mind	Won	
Boston Film Festival	2010	Best Lead Actor	Conviction	Won	
British Independent Film Awards	2009	Best Lead Actor	Moon	Nominated	
British Independent Film Awards	2017	Best Supporting Actor	Three Billboards Outside Ebbing, Missouri	Nominated	
Capri-Hollywood Film Festival Award	2017	Best Supporting Actor	Three Billboards Outside Ebbing, Missouri	Won	
Chlotrudis Award	2010	Best Lead Actor	Moon	Nominated	
Chlotrudis Award	2014	Best Supporting Actor	The Way Way Back	Nominated	
Dorian Awards	2018	Best Supporting Actor	Three Billboards Outside Ebbing, Missouri	Nominated	
Gold Derby Awards	2018	Best Supporting Actor	Three Billboards Outside Ebbing, Missouri	Won	
Gold Derby Awards	2018	Best Ensemble Cast	Three Billboards Outside Ebbing, Missouri	Won	
Golden Schmoes Award	2009	Best Actor of the Year	Moon	Won	
Golden Schmoes Award	2017	Best Supporting Actor of the Year	Three Billboards Outside Ebbing, Missouri	Nominated	
Gotham Awards	1998	Breakthrough Actor	Lawn Dogs	Nominated	
Hollywood Film Awards	2010	Best Supporting Actor	Conviction	Won	
Hollywood Film Awards	2017	Best Supporting Actor	Three Billboards Outside Ebbing, Missouri	Won	
IMDb Award	2017	Fan Favorite – STARmeter award	Three Billboards Outside Ebbing, Missouri	Nominated	
Independent Spirit Awards	2012	Best Supporting Male	Seven Psychopaths	Nominated	
Independent Spirit Awards	2017	Best Supporting Male	Three Billboards Outside Ebbing, Missouri	Won	
International Online Cinema	2010	Best Lead Actor	Moon	Nominated	
International Online Cinema	2018	Best Supporting Actor	Three Billboards Outside Ebbing, Missouri	Nominated	
Irish Film & Television Academy	2010	Best International Actor	Moon	Nominated	
Italian Online Movie Award	2010	Best Lead Actor	Moon	Nominated	
Montreal World Film Festival	1997	Best Lead Actor	Lawn Dogs	Won	
Newport Beach Film Festival	2013	Best Lead Actor	A Single Shot	Won	
Online Film & Television Association	2018	Best Supporting Actor	Three Billboards Outside Ebbing, Missouri	Won	
Online Film & Television Association	2018	Best Ensemble	Three Billboards Outside Ebbing, Missouri	Won	
Satellite Awards	2003	Best Lead Actor in a Motion Picture – Comedy or Musical	Confession of a Dangerous Mind	Nominated	
Satellite Awards	2004	Best Supporting Actor in a Motion Picture – Comedy or Musical	Matchstick Men	Nominated	
Satellite Awards	2008	Best Lead Actor in a Motion Picture – Comedy or Musical	Choke	Nominated	
Satellite Awards	2017	Best Supporting Actor – Motion Picture	Three Billboards Outside Ebbing, Missouri	Won	
Satellite Awards	2019	Best Actor in a Miniseries or TV Film	Fosse/Verdon	Nominated	
Saturn Awards	2010	Best Lead Actor	Moon	Nominated	
Scream Awards	2009	Best Science Fiction Actor	Moon	Nominated	
Seattle International Film Festival	2009	Best Lead Actor	Moon	Nominated	
Sitges Film Festival	1997	Best Lead Actor	Lawn Dogs	Won	
Sitges Film Festival	2007	Best Lead Actor	Joshua	Nominated	
Sitges Film Festival	2009	Best Lead Actor	Moon	Won	
Sundance Film Festival	2008	Best Ensemble	Choke	Nominated	
Village Voice Film Poll	2017	Best Supporting Actor	Three Billboards Outside Ebbing, Missouri	Nominated	

== See also ==
- Sam Rockwell on screen and stage
