= Sam Rockwell =

American actor (born 1968)

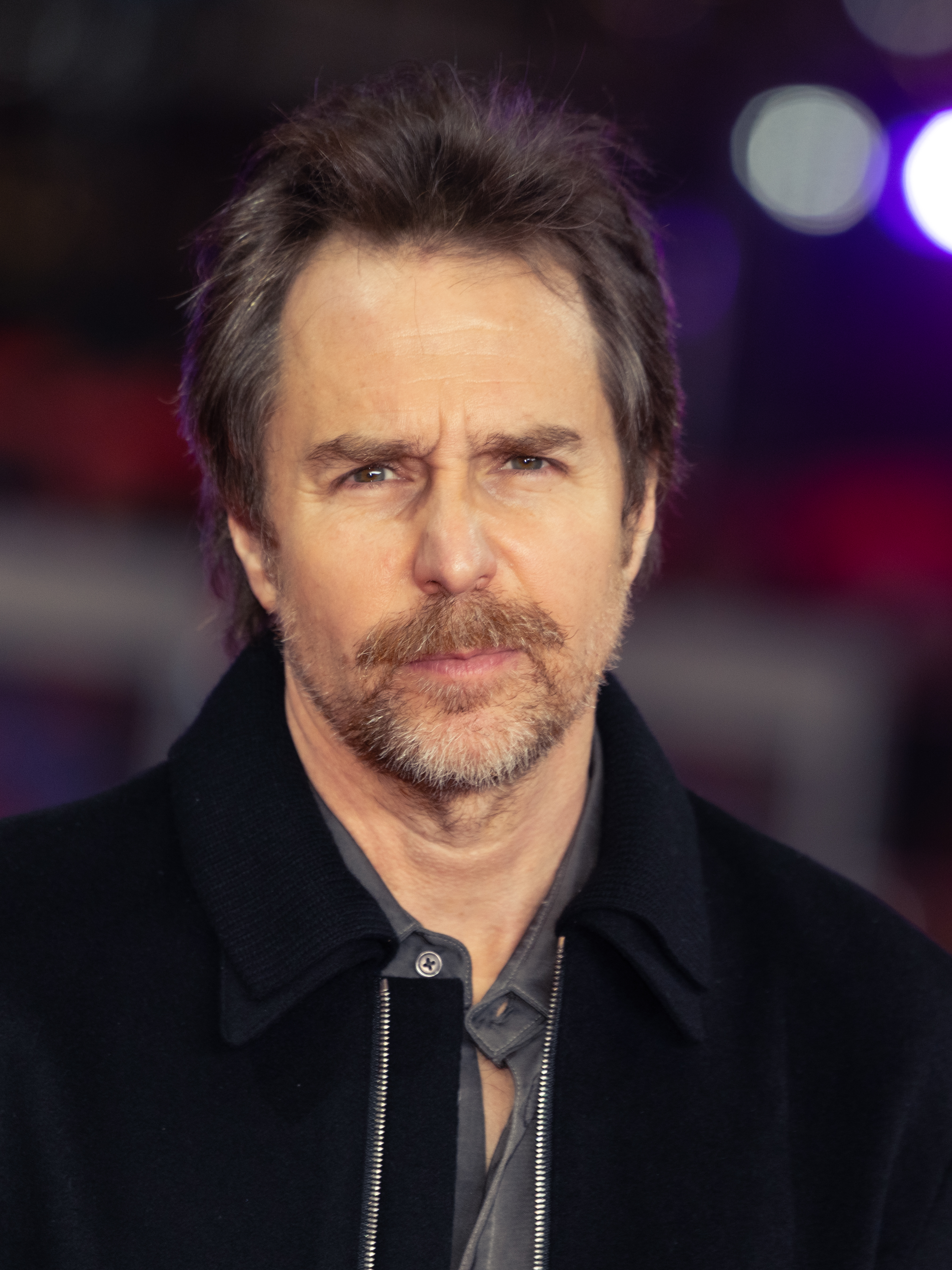
- Rockwell at the 2026 Berlinale
- Born: November 5, 1968 (age 58); Daly City, California, U.S.
- Education: William Esper Studio
- Occupation: Actor
- Years active: 1988–present
- Works: Full list
- Partner: Leslie Bibb (2007–present)
- Awards: Full list

Samuel Rockwell (born November 5, 1968) is an American actor. In a career spanning over three decades of stage and screen, he is known for his offbeat and charismatic character roles in independent films, and has received various accolades including an Academy Award, a BAFTA Award, a Golden Globe Award, and a Silver Bear, in addition to nominations for three Primetime Emmy Awards and a Tony Award.

Rockwell started his career portraying diverse supporting roles in a variety of genres, with a number of guest television roles and roles in films such as Teenage Mutant Ninja Turtles (1990), The Green Mile (1999), Galaxy Quest (1999), and Charlie's Angels (2000). He began to garner greater notice in the 2000s with his performance as Chuck Barris in the spy thriller Confessions of a Dangerous Mind (2002), for which he received the Silver Bear for Best Actor. His acclaim continued with roles in Moon (2009), Conviction (2010), Seven Psychopaths (2012), and The Way, Way Back (2013).

Rockwell won the Academy Award for Best Supporting Actor for playing a troubled police deputy in Martin McDonagh's crime drama Three Billboards Outside Ebbing, Missouri (2017), and was nominated again the following year for his portrayal of George W. Bush in Adam McKay's biopic Vice (2018). During this time he has acted in the satirical dramedy Jojo Rabbit (2019), the biographical drama Richard Jewell (2019), the historical drama The Best of Enemies (2019), the mystery comedy See How They Run (2022) and voicing Mr. Wolf in the crime animated comedy film franchise The Bad Guys (2022–present).

On television, Rockwell won an Actor Award and received two Primetime Emmy Award nominations for his portrayal of Bob Fosse in the FX on Hulu limited series Fosse/Verdon (2019). For his performance in the third season of The White Lotus (2025), he received a Primetime Emmy Award nomination. On stage, he has starred in the Broadway productions of Martin McDonagh's A Behanding in Spokane (2010) and the revival of David Mamet's American Buffalo (2022), the later of which earned him a nomination for the Tony Award for Best Actor in a Play.

== Early life and education ==
Rockwell was born November 5, 1968, in Daly City, California, a suburb of San Francisco. He is the only child of actors Pete Rockwell and Penny Hess. After their divorce when he was five, he was raised by his father in San Francisco and spent his summers with his mother in New York City. At age 10, he made a brief stage appearance as Humphrey Bogart in an East Village improv comedy sketch with his mother.

He started high school at the Ruth Asawa San Francisco School of the Arts with Margaret Cho and Aisha Tyler, but received his high school diploma from Urban Pioneers, an Outward Bound-style alternative school. Rockwell explained, "I just wanted to get stoned, flirt with girls, go to parties." The school "had a reputation as a place stoners went because it was easy to graduate." The school helped him regain an interest in performing. After appearing in an independent film during his senior year, he moved to New York to pursue an acting career. He later enrolled in the Professional Actor Training Program at the William Esper Studio in New York.

== Career ==
=== 1989–1998: Early roles and rise to prominence ===
Rockwell’s film debut was in the controversial horror film Clownhouse in 1989, produced by Francis Ford Coppola, which he filmed while living in San Francisco. Rockwell went on to say: "It was great. We shot at Coppola's house. I didn't know anything about acting ... It was fun." the film was later pulled from distribution after director Victor Salva was convicted of abusing the 12-year-old male star of the film during production. Subsequently, Rockwell moved to New York and trained at the William Esper Studios. Since 1992, Rockwell has been a member of the New York–based LAByrinth Theater Company, where John Ortiz is a co-artistic director.

Rockwell’s career slowly gained momentum in the early 1990s, when he alternated between small-screen guest spots in TV series like The Equalizer, NYPD Blue and Law & Order and small roles in films such as Last Exit to Brooklyn and Teenage Mutant Ninja Turtles. He played the role of Gary in the 1991 comedy movie Strictly Business. He also appeared as the title character in The Search for One-eye Jimmy (1994). During this time, Rockwell also worked in restaurants as a busboy and delivered burritos by bicycle. At one point, Rockwell worked as a private detective's assistant. "I tailed a chick who was having an affair and took pictures of her at this motel", he told Rolling Stone in 2002. "It was pretty sleazy." A well-paying Miller commercial in 1994 finally allowed him to pursue acting full-time.

The turning point in Rockwell's career was Tom DiCillo's independent buddy film Box of Moonlight (1996), in which he played a Tennessee hillbilly who dresses like Davy Crockett and lives in an isolated mobile home with stolen lawn decorations. The ensuing acclaim put him front and center with casting agents and newfound fans alike, with Rockwell himself acknowledging that "That film was definitely a turning point ... I was sort of put on some independent film map after 10 years in New York." Rockwell later elaborated: "People saw it at Sundance and it got me a lot of attention ... It led to Lawn Dogs, and Safe Men, and Jerry and Tom."

He then received strong reviews for the film Lawn Dogs (1997), where he played a working-class landscaper who befriends a wealthy 10-year-old girl (Mischa Barton) in an upper-class gated community in Kentucky; Rockwell's performance won him Best Actor honors at both the Montreal World Film Festival and the Catalan International Film Festival. In 1999, Rockwell played the deranged prisoner William "Wild Bill" Wharton in the Stephen King prison drama The Green Mile. At the time of the film's shooting, Rockwell explained why he was attracted to playing such unlikable characters. He said, "I like that dark stuff. I think heroes should be flawed. There's a bit of self-loathing in there, and a bit of anger ... But after this, I've really got to play some lawyers, or a British aristocrat, or they'll put a label on me."

=== 1999–2016: Hollywood recognition ===
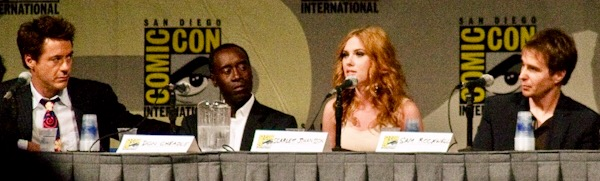
From left: Robert Downey Jr., Don Cheadle, Scarlett Johansson, and Rockwell at the 2009 San Diego Comic-Con for Iron Man 2

After appearances as a bumbling actor in the science fiction parody Galaxy Quest (1999), Rockwell went on to say: "Who doesn't love that fucking movie, right?" He also played Francis Flute in the Shakespeare adaptation A Midsummer Night's Dream (1999), and gregarious villain Eric Knox in Charlie's Angels (2000), Rockwell won the then-biggest leading role of his career as The Gong Show host Chuck Barris in George Clooney's directorial debut, Confessions of a Dangerous Mind (2002). Rockwell's performance was well-received, and the film earned generally positive reviews. "That is a great movie. George (Clooney) really taught me to be simple and not like put too much in there."

Rockwell also received positive notices for his role opposite Nicolas Cage in Ridley Scott's Matchstick Men (2003), with Entertainment Weekly calling him "destined by a kind of excessive interestingness to forever be a colorful sidekick." Rockwell went on to say: "Matchstick Men was really fun. Had a lot of fun with Nic (Cage). Alison Lohman, incredible. Bruce McGill. Ridley Scott ... He's really cool ... He let us really go ... he let us fuck around with that. (Producers) would never make that movie for that amount of money now (in 2026). We had nice trailers and we got paid." He received somewhat more mixed reviews as Zaphod Beeblebrox in the film version of The Hitchhiker's Guide to the Galaxy (2005). About the film, Rockwell said: "Not fun really... it's all the kind of stuff Jim Carrey and Eddie Murphy did very well... Those puppets were phenomenal and the sets were incredible." In 2005, Philip Seymour Hoffman directed him in Stephen Adly Guirgis' hit play The Last Days of Judas Iscariot. Rockwell workshopped a LAByrinth production, North of Mason-Dixon, which debuted in London in 2007 and then premiered in New York later the same year. Other plays in which Rockwell has performed include: Dumb Waiter (2001), Zoo Story (2001), The Hot L Baltimore (2000), Goosepimples (1998), Love and Human Remains, Face Divided, Orphans, Den of Thieves, Dessert at Waffle House, The Largest Elizabeth in the World, and A Behanding in Spokane.

He then had a notable supporting role as Charley Ford, brother of Casey Affleck's character Robert Ford, in the well-received drama The Assassination of Jesse James by the Coward Robert Ford (2007), in which Brad Pitt played the lead role of Jesse James. About taking on the role, Rockwell revealed: "I didn't want to do that movie initially but then I was glad I did it because it was such a great movie." According to an interview on The Howard Stern Show, director Jon Favreau considered casting him as the titular character in Iron Man as the studio was initially hesitant to work with Robert Downey Jr., who had been considered for his role in The Hitchhiker's Guide to the Galaxy. Rockwell eventually appeared in Iron Man 2, released in 2010, as Tony Stark's rival weapons developer, Justin Hammer.

In addition to big-budget feature films, Rockwell has also appeared in indie films such as The F Word and played a randy, Halloween-costume-clad Batman in a short, Robin's Big Date, opposite Justin Long as Robin. He also starred in the film Snow Angels (2008) opposite Kate Beckinsale. Rockwell said about the movie: "That's a good one ... I think David allowed me to do what I wanted to do ... David Gordon Green and I created this character together based on this book. It was a dark story and there was this documentary that Brad Pitt gave me about these born again Christians who blow up abortion clinics ... that was very helpful, watching that. It was a really cool movie to do." He has worked on several occasions with the comedy troupe Stella (Michael Ian Black, Michael Showalter and David Wain), making cameo appearances in their short films and eponymous TV series.

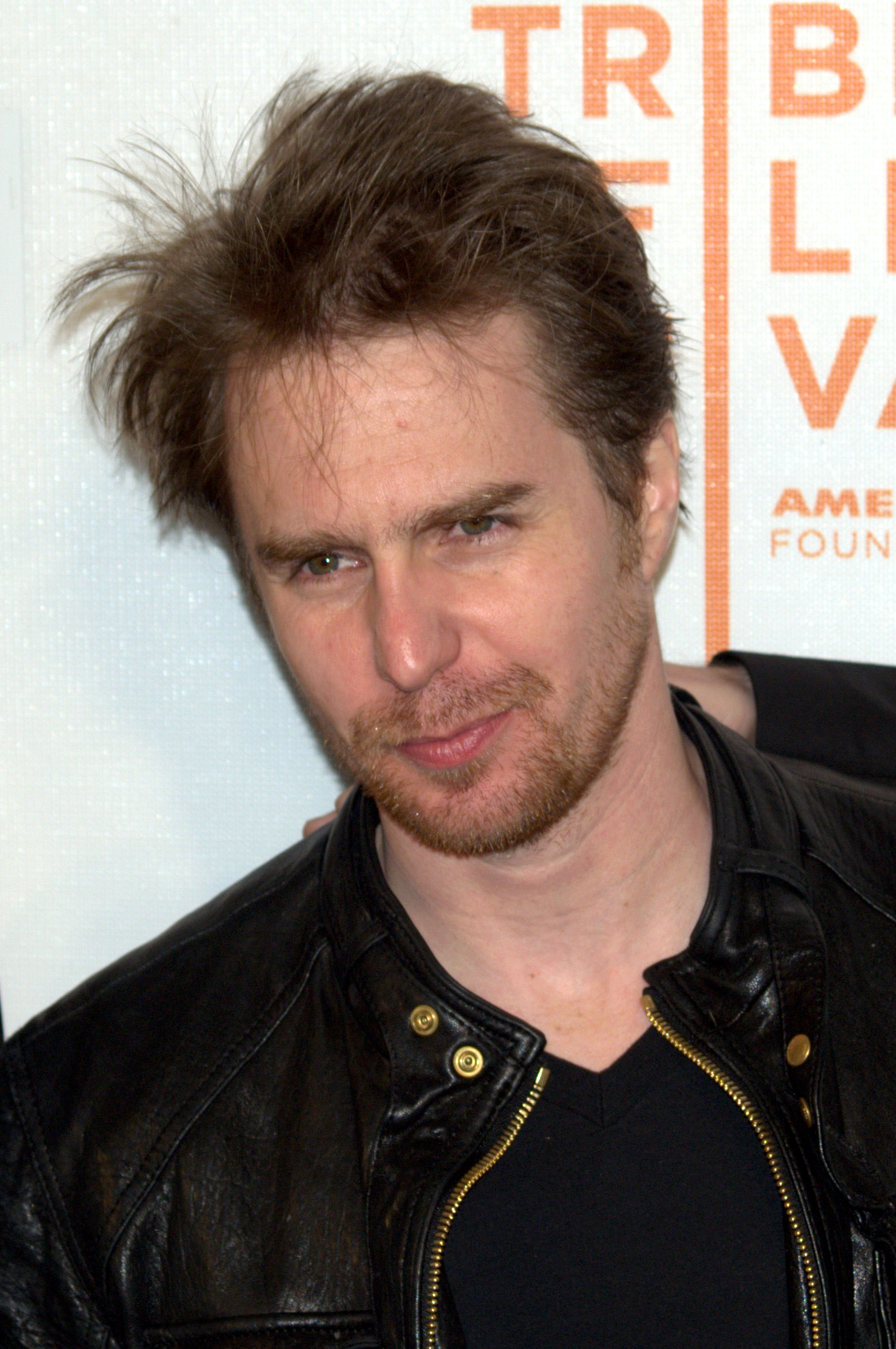
Rockwell at the 2009 Tribeca Film Festival for Moon

Rockwell played Victor Mancini in the film Choke (2008), based on the novel by Chuck Palahniuk. Critic Roger Ebert said of his performance that he "seems to have become the latter-day version of Christopher Walken – not all the time, but when you need him, he's your go-to guy for weirdness."

In 2007, Rockwell guest-starred in the web series Casted: The Continuing Chronicles of Derek Riffchyn, Greatest Casting Director in the World. Ever. He appears opposite Jonathan Togo as Derek and Justin Long as Scott. Rockwell plays an aspiring young actor named Pete Sampras. In 2009, he starred in the critically acclaimed science fiction film Moon, directed by Duncan Jones. His performance as a lonely astronaut on a long-term solo mission to the Moon was widely praised, with some critics calling for an Academy Award for Best Actor nomination. Rockwell went on to say about playing the dual roles: "The trick of (playing opposite yourself) is you can be your own director and have control over the scene because you're playing both parts ... That's a trick I've seen done well a couple of times ... Jeremy Irons in Dead Ringers, I watched that quite a bit and I watched Midnight Cowboys." On May 3, 2010, it was announced that Rockwell would team up again with Iron Man 2 director Jon Favreau for Favreau's adaptation of the graphic novel Cowboys & Aliens. He played a bar owner named Doc who joins in the pursuit of the aliens.

Rockwell also had key roles in Martin McDonagh's Seven Psychopaths (2012), and Nat Faxon and Jim Rash's The Way, Way Back (2013). For his performance in The Way, Way Back, some critics felt he again deserved an Academy Award nomination. He went on to say: "Oh man, I love that movie. That's a fun movie. We were ab-libbing. That's essentially Bill Murray in Meatballs - I mean, that's the character." In January 2014, it was announced that Rockwell was cast in The Eel, in which he played an escaped convict. The film was produced by Kevin Walsh, Nat Faxon, and Jim Rash, marking Rockwell's second collaboration with all three. Additionally, in 2015 Rockwell starred in two films, remake of Poltergeist and Mr. Right. The latter is about an ex-CIA agent turned hitman who gained a conscience and turned the tables on those that hired him as a hitman. He also becomes brutally honest with his girlfriend, portrayed by Anna Kendrick, on what he does. She then turns herself into a hitwoman. On May 3, 2016, it was announced that Rockwell would voice Mortimer Ramsey in the action video game Dishonored 2. Rockwell was cast along with other Marvel Cinematic Universe actors.

=== 2017–present: Oscar win and Career expansion ===
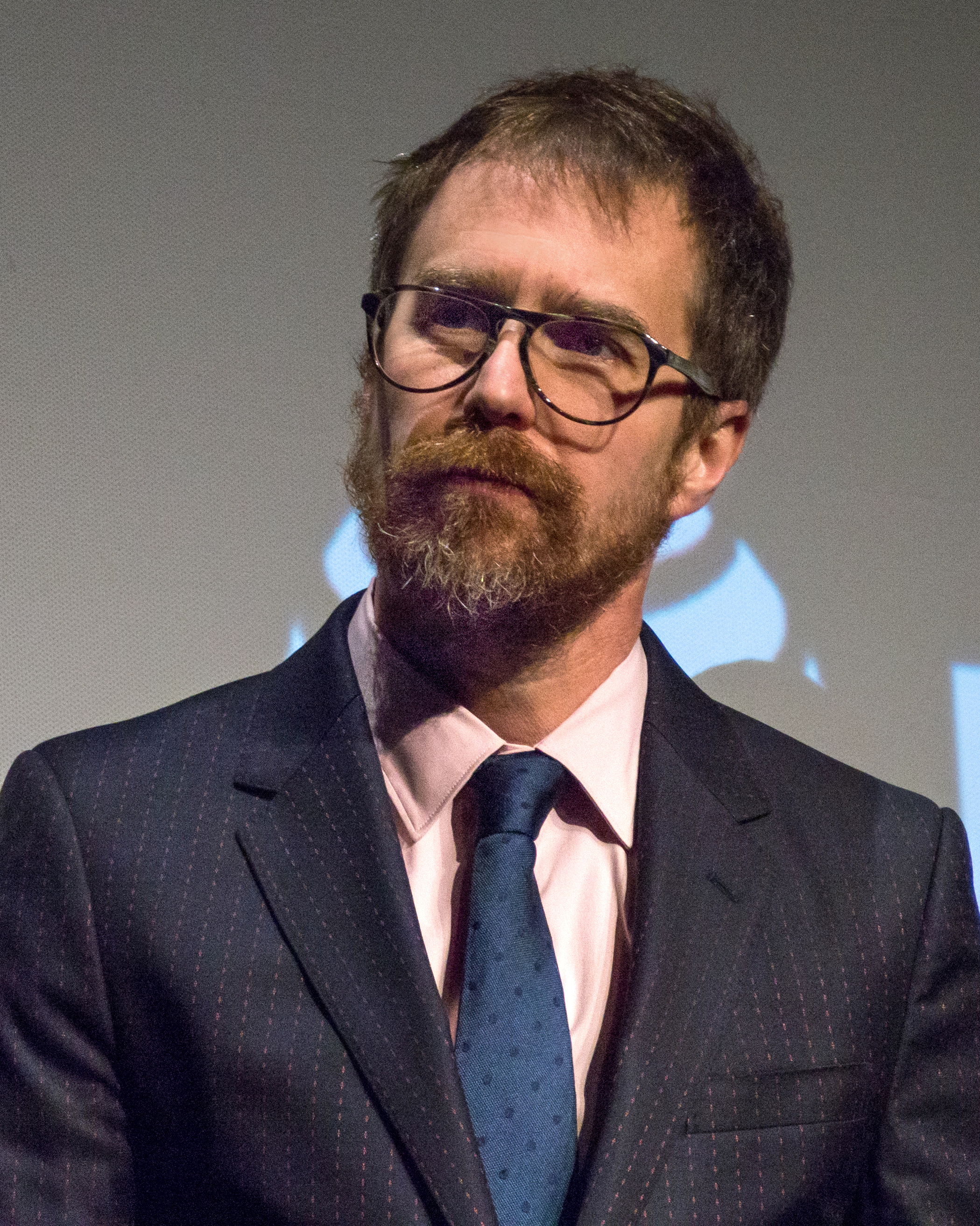
Rockwell at the 2018 Tribeca Film Festival for Woman Walks Ahead

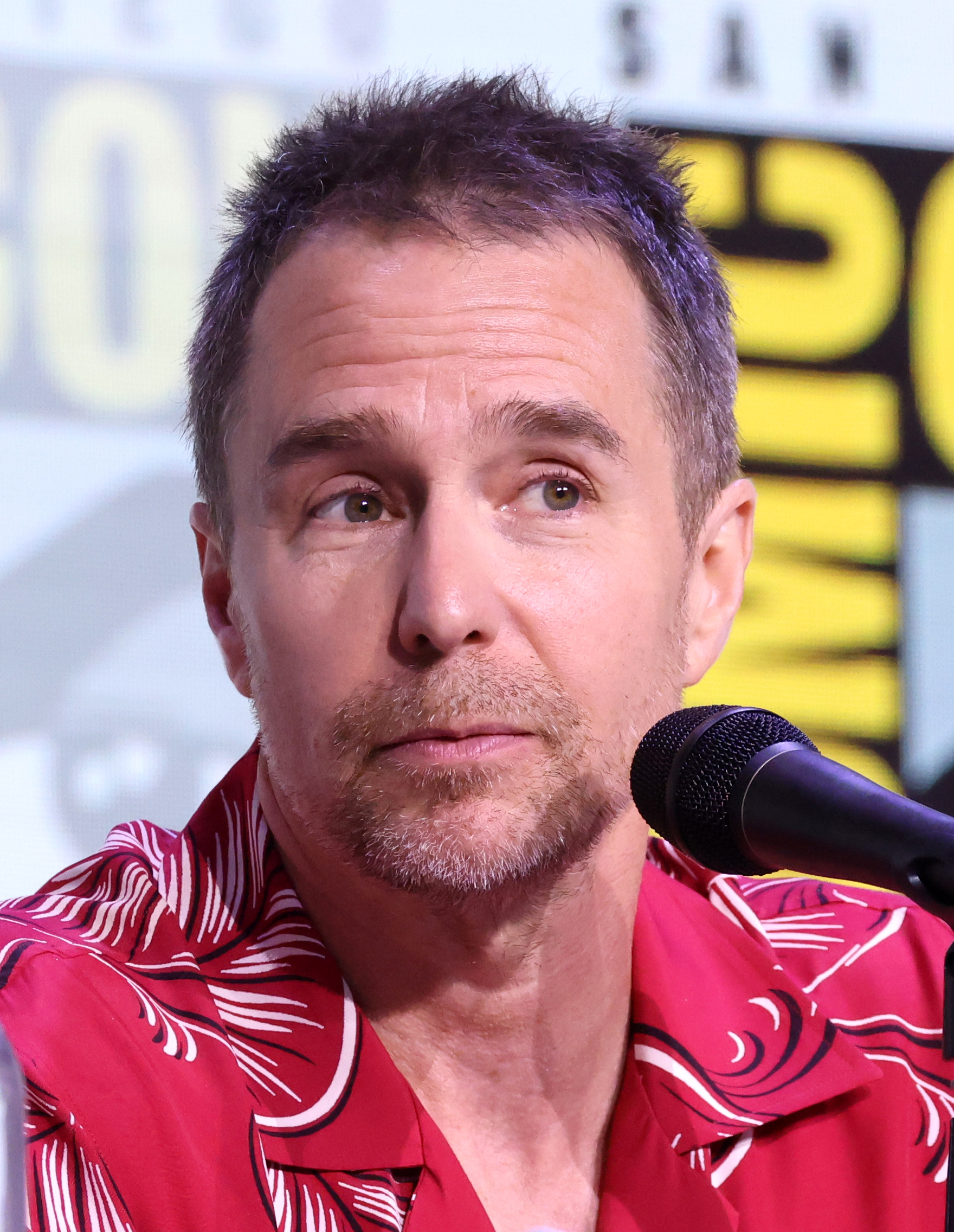
Rockwell at the 2025 San Diego Comic-Con for The Bad Guys 2

Rockwell re-teamed with McDonagh for the 2017 film Three Billboards Outside Ebbing, Missouri. His performance as a racist, bullying police officer Jason Dixon won several accolades, including his first Academy Award, as well as a Golden Globe, BAFTA, and two Screen Actors Guild Awards. In August 2017, Rockwell was cast to play Former President George W. Bush in Adam McKay's Vice, a biopic of Dick Cheney. He received BAFTA, Critics' Choice, and Golden Globe nominations, as well as his second Academy Award nomination. Rockwell was cast as Bob Fosse with Michelle Williams as Gwen Verdon in the 2019 miniseries Fosse/Verdon, for which he received critical acclaim along with Critics' Choice, Golden Globe, and two Primetime Emmy Award nominations. That same year, Rockwell appeared in two acclaimed films, Richard Jewell and Jojo Rabbit. In 2020, he had a voice role in DreamWorks Animation's Trolls World Tour, also serving as a performer on the film's soundtrack; and also voiced Ivan the Gorilla in the 2020 Disney+ film The One and Only Ivan.

In 2022, he returned to the Broadway stage in a revival of David Mamet's American Buffalo alongside Laurence Fishburne and Darren Criss. For his performance in the play, Rockwell received his first nomination for the Tony Award for Best Performance by a Leading Actor in a Play. Rockwell also provided the voice of the main character Mr. Wolf in another DreamWorks Animation film, 2022's The Bad Guys, and reprised the role in the 2025 sequel The Bad Guys 2. In 2025, Rockwell appeared as a guest star in the third season of The White Lotus, drawing praise for his lengthy monologue in the fifth episode. He also played Man from the Future in Gore Verbinski's science fiction comedy Good Luck, Have Fun, Don't Die.

He next starred in Wild Horse Nine with John Malkovich and Steve Buscemi, Ray Gunn with Scarlett Johansson, The Semant Movie, Stuntnuts: The Movie, and The Adventures of Drunky. Rockwell will return to the stage in an off-Broadway production of the Arthur Miller play A View from the Bridge acting alongside Marin Ireland and Alfred Molina with performances starting in November 2026 in New York City.

== Personal life ==
=== Relationship ===
Rockwell has never been married, and said in a 2007 interview, "I definitely don't want to become a parent. It's not my bag." He has been in a long-term relationship with actress Leslie Bibb since 2007. They met in Los Angeles while he was filming Frost/Nixon. Rockwell and Bibb appeared together in Iron Man 2, Don Verdean, and The White Lotus.

=== Illness ===
In 2013, Rockwell contracted Lyme disease and was briefly hospitalized.

== Acting credits and accolades ==
For his performance as a troubled police officer in the crime drama Three Billboards Outside Ebbing, Missouri, Rockwell won the Academy Award, the Actor Award, the BAFTA Award, the Critics' Choice Movie Award and the Golden Globe Award, all for Best Supporting Actor. His portrayal of George W. Bush in the biopic Vice earned him his second Academy Award, BAFTA and Golden Globe nominations in the same category.
