= The Apache Relay =

American folk-rock band

- Origin: Nashville, TN
- Genre: Folk rock
- Years active: 2009–2015
- Label: Dine Alone Records (Canada)
- Members: Michael Ford Jr; Mike Harris; Brett Moore; Steve Smith; Kellen Wenrich; Ben Ford
- Website: theapacherelay.com

The Apache Relay was an American folk-rock band based out of Nashville, Tennessee. The band consisted of Michael Ford Jr (singer/guitarist), Mike Harris (guitar), Brett Moore (mandolin, organ), Steve Smith (drums), Kellen Wenrich (fiddle) and Ben Ford (bass and vocals). The band's name originated from a race-competition scene in the movie Heavyweights.

== History ==
Formed in a dorm at Belmont University, they released the concept album 1988 in 2009 under the moniker "Michael Ford Jr. & the Apache Relay", later dropping the frontman's name for their follow-up 2011 album American Nomad. They opened for a number of Mumford & Sons tour dates, appeared at numerous music festivals, and a song from the album, "Power Hungry Animals" was used in the 2013 comedy film The Way Way Back.

In 2014 they released the single "Katie Queen of Tennessee" from their eponymous 2014 album The Apache Relay. They also recorded a cover of the Bruce Springsteen song "Cover Me" for the Dead Man's Town: A Tribute to Born in the U.S.A. compilation album.

== Discography ==
Title	Details	Peak chart positions
Title	Details	US Heat
1988	Release date: 2009; Label: Formats:	—
American Nomad	Release date: 2011; Label: Formats:	—
The Apache Relay	Release date: April 22, 2014; Label: Formats:	43
"—" denotes releases that did not chart
