= Lawn Dogs =

1997 film by John Duigan

- Theatrical release poster
- Directed by: John Duigan
- Written by: Naomi Wallace
- Produced by: Duncan Kenworthy
- Starring: Sam Rockwell; Christopher McDonald; Kathleen Quinlan; Mischa Barton
- Cinematography: Elliot Davis
- Edited by: Humphrey Dixon
- Music by: Trevor Jones
- Distributed by: Rank Film Distributors (United Kingdom); Strand Releasing (United States)
- Release dates: 21 November 1997 (United Kingdom); 15 May 1998 (United States)
- Running time: 101 minutes
- Countries: United Kingdom; United States
- Language: English
- Budget: £6.9 million
- Box office: $106,404

Lawn Dogs is a 1997 Southern Gothic fantasy drama film directed by John Duigan, written by Naomi Wallace, and starring Sam Rockwell, Mischa Barton, Christopher McDonald, and Kathleen Quinlan. Its plot focuses on a precocious, antisocial young girl from an affluent suburban gated community in Kentucky who befriends a redneck landscaper, and examines the societal repercussions of their friendship.

Filmed in Louisville and Danville, Kentucky, Lawn Dogs was an international co-production between the United Kingdom and United States, and produced by British film producer Duncan Kenworthy. It was the final film financed by the Rank Organisation. The Rank Group sold its film interests to Carlton Communications in April 1997 and in September that company shut down Rank's distribution and production arms.

Lawn Dogs won numerous film awards at film festivals in Europe and was met with generally positive reviews, with praise for the performances of Barton and Rockwell in particular.

== Plot ==
Ten-year-old Devon Stockard, a precocious and lonely young girl obsessed with the fairy tale of the Baba Yaga, has recently moved into the suburban gated community of Camelot Gardens in McCade County, Kentucky outside of Louisville with her parents, Morton and Clare. Recently recovered from open heart surgery, Devon is encouraged by her parents to make friends in the neighborhood and is pushed to sell cookies for a charity event for the summer in hopes to receive good publicity in the local newspaper.

While selling the cookies, Devon leaves the gated community against her mother's instructions, and meets Trent Burns, a young poverty-stricken man illegally living in a trailer in a nearby state nature reserve. She learns that Trent works in Camelot Gardens as a landscaper mowing lawns for its residents.

Devon, at first annoying Trent, continues to come to his property and slowly befriends him. Despite the innocence of their friendship, he insists that she keep it a secret because of their age difference. While working in Camelot Gardens, Trent has altercations with four people who live there; Brett, a man who has a secret affair with Claire, Sean, a closeted homosexual man who tries to flirt with him, Nash, an ex-cop-turned-security guard for Camelot Gardens who harasses Trent for his perceived white trash lifestyle, and Pam Gregory, a wealthy young woman who Trent has a secret intimate relationship with.

During a family barbecue, exploring her father's car in their garage, Devon finds his handgun in the SUV's glove compartment. Brett discovers her with it and attempts to molest her, but she escapes. Telling her parents about the incident, they respond by stressing over the social implications and how influential Brett's father is. So, Devon changes the story to that Brett was only trying to tickle her.

While Trent is mowing lawns in Camelot Gardens, Sean and Brett degrade Trent's blue-collar status and racially discriminate Salvador, a Latino American mailman. Salvador then places a package in front of his mower that Trent shreds without hesitation.

Clare begins to notice Devon's friendship with Trent when he comes to do lawn work at their house and becomes alarmed. Meanwhile, Brett and Sean vandalize Trent's lawnmower, pouring sugar in the fuel tank, and start a fight with him after accusing him of stealing CDs from Sean's car, which results in Brett cutting Trent with his weedeater and Trent biting Sean in retaliation.

Devon and Trent's friendship grows following the attack by Sean and Brett, and they visit Trent's mother and his father, a Korean War veteran dying of lung disease. After leaving their trailer park, Trent and Devon go for a drive in the country. While stopped in a hay field, she insists that as they are "best friends", she can show him the surgical scar on her chest. Insisting he touch it to his reluctance, she then demands he show her the abdominal scar he sustained in a police brutality-related shooting, which she touches as well. After this, they see Sean's escaped dog, Tracker, running through the field. While trying to chase it down in his pickup truck, they accidentally run him over, wounding it. Trent uses a two by four to put it down, although Devon pleads with him not to. Devon then runs home, panicked after witnessing Trent's actions. Meanwhile, Trent wraps Tracker in one of his dad's American flags in front of the entrance to Camelot Gardens, in which Nash later finds.

Clare and Morton, concerned over Devon's frantic behavior, ask her what happened. She won't provide details, only saying that Trent killed Tracker, and mentions she and Trent took turns showing each other their scars. Assuming that Trent molested her, Morton drives out to Trent's trailer with Devon, assisted by Sean and Nash. The three confront Trent while Devon sits in the car.

Morton and Sean take turns beating Trent, and Morton accuses him of sexually abusing Devon. He attacks Trent with a piece of wood, beating him to the ground, handing it to Sean; but before he can hit him, Devon exits her father's car with his pistol, shooting Sean in the abdomen. As Sean bleeds to death on the ground, Devon urges Trent to leave, giving him a towel and a comb for him to throw out if he is being chased after.

After they say their goodbyes, Devon orders her dad at gunpoint to lift her up into the tree she and Trent had decorated with ribbons. Up in the tree, Devon begins telling her own Baba Yaga fairy tale with a story similar to her and Trent's. While Trent escapes in his pickup truck, he throws the towel into a river while crossing a bridge, causing the river to flood after he crosses. Further down on a country road, he then throws the comb behind him, which causes a forest to grow behind him, separating him from Camelot Gardens and having him safe at last.

== Cast ==
- Mischa Barton as Devon Stockard
- Sam Rockwell as Trent Burns
- Christopher McDonald as Morton Stockard
- Kathleen Quinlan as Clare Stockard
- Miles Meehan as Billy
- Bruce McGill as Nash
- David Barry Gray as Brett
- Eric Mabius as Sean
- Angie Harmon as Pam
- José Orlando Araque as Mailman
- Beth Grant as Mrs. Burns
- Tom Aldredge as Mr. Burns
- Odin the Dog and Tafeki the Dog as Tracker the Dog

== Production ==
The film was based on an original screenplay by Naomi Wallace, a playwright and poet from Kentucky. It was financed by Rank Organisation, the first film the British company had fully financed in sixteen years.

Filming took place on-location in the city of Prospect, Kentucky outside of Louisville and in Oldham County, Kentucky.

== Reception ==
The film was well received by critics, based on 18 reviews collected by Rotten Tomatoes it holds a 72% overall approval rating. Time Out praised Duigan in that he "maintains an atmosphere where dream is a short step from nightmare. Quirkily haunting." Janet Maslin of The New York Times praised the casting of Barton and Rockwell "it also shows off a poised young actress and a leading man with charisma to burn". Maslin felt that the "pointedly whimsical film overworks the fairy-tale aspect of this friendship (between Devon and Trent)", she concluded that Duigan "does breathe life into a story that rails against conventional wisdom". Empire praised Barton's "hypnotic central performance" and Wallace's "intelligent first screenplay". The review continued to note that "Duigan makes imaginative use of his material, heightening Devon's home-life horrors to semi-cartoonishness without stretching credibility, and the fantasy finale is a winner." The Washington Post praised the film as a lyrical Southern Gothic narrative of love and hate.

A dissenting review came from Roger Ebert, who wrote in the Chicago Sun-Times that Lawn Dogs is well-made but ultimately directionless and without meaning: "All of [the film's] events happen with the precision and vivid detail of a David Lynch movie, but I do not know why. It is easy to make a film about people who are pigs and people who are free spirits, but unless you show how or why they got that way, they're simply characters you've created."

=== Accolades ===
Year	Award	Category	Result
1997	Athens International Film Festival	"Audience Award" - John Duigan	Won
1997	Montreal World Film Festival	"Best Actor" - Sam Rockwell	Won
1997	Montreal World Film Festival	"Grand Prix des Amériques" - John Duigan	Nominated
1997	Stockholm Film Festival	"Audience Award" - John Duigan	Won
1997	Sitges Film Festival	"Best Actor" - Sam Rockwell	Won
1997	Sitges Film Festival	"Best Screenplay" - Naomi Wallace	Won
1997	Sitges Film Festival	"Best Film" - John Duigan	Nominated
1998	Brussels International Fantastic Film Festival	"Golden Raven" - John Duigan	Won
1998	Brussels International Fantastic Film Festival	"Grand Prize of European Fantasy Film in Silver" - John Duigan	Won
1998	Fantafestival	"Grand Prize of European Fantasy Film in Gold" - John Duigan	Nominated
