= The Way, Way Back =

2013 American comedy-drama film by Nat Faxon and Jim Rash

- Theatrical release poster
- Directed by: Nat Faxon; Jim Rash
- Written by: Nat Faxon; Jim Rash
- Produced by: Kevin J. Walsh; Tom Rice
- Starring: Steve Carell; Toni Collette; Allison Janney; AnnaSophia Robb; Sam Rockwell; Maya Rudolph; Liam James; Rob Corddry; Amanda Peet
- Cinematography: John Bailey
- Edited by: Tatiana S. Riegel
- Music by: Rob Simonsen
- Production companies: Sycamore Pictures; The Walsh Company; OddLot Entertainment
- Distributed by: Fox Searchlight Pictures
- Release dates: January 21, 2013 (Sundance); July 5, 2013 (United States)
- Running time: 103 minutes
- Country: United States
- Language: English
- Budget: $5 million
- Box office: $26.9 million

The Way, Way Back is a 2013 American coming-of-age comedy-drama film written and directed by Nat Faxon and Jim Rash in their directorial debuts. It stars Liam James as Duncan, an introverted 14-year-old who goes on summer vacation to Wareham, Massachusetts, with his mother and her overbearing boyfriend. It also stars Steve Carell, Toni Collette, Allison Janney, AnnaSophia Robb, Sam Rockwell, and Maya Rudolph, with Rob Corddry, Amanda Peet, Faxon, and Rash in supporting roles.

Faxon and Rash conceived the film in the early 2000s, but it spent several years in development hell before funding could be secured. Filming lasted several months during summer 2012. It premiered at the 2013 Sundance Film Festival, where Fox Searchlight Pictures (which also distributed The Descendants, co-written by Faxon and Rash, and where the film was originally in production) acquired distribution rights to it. The film was theatrically released in the United States on July 5, 2013, where it received positive reviews and was a box office success, grossing $26.9 million against its $5 million budget.

== Plot ==
Introverted 14-year-old Duncan from Albany, New York, reluctantly goes on summer vacation to a beach house in Wareham, Massachusetts, with his mother Pam, her wealthy boyfriend Trent, and Trent's spoiled daughter Steph. Trent and Steph are frequently condescending towards Duncan.

On the way to the beach house, Trent asks Duncan to rate himself on a scale of one to ten. Duncan says six, but Trent states that he is a three. At the house they are greeted by their neighbors: gregarious, heavy-drinking Betty, her children Susanna and Peter, and married couple Kip and Joan. Later that evening, Duncan and Susanna have an awkward conversation from their adjacent porches.

While exploring the town Duncan meets Owen, a worker at the local water park, Water Wizz. Owen takes Duncan under his wing and introduces him to the park's employees: Caitlin, Lewis, and Roddy. Several youths at the water park speak reverently of a legendary pass in the tube slide, wondering how it could have been done. Owen hires Duncan for odd jobs at the park to help boost his confidence.

Duncan is continually neglected by Pam, who indulges in drinking, staying out late, and smoking marijuana with other adult vacationers. At a Fourth of July cookout, Susanna invites him to go hunting for ghost crabs with her and Peter, where they both open up about their absent fathers. Later that night, Duncan witnesses Trent and Joan kissing, but does not tell anyone.

Pam suspects Trent is having an affair, but he dissuades her of this notion. Later, Duncan confronts Pam in front of the others and tells her to leave Trent. When Trent interjects, Duncan insults and shoves him; Trent indignantly tells Duncan his father does not want him. Duncan flees, and Susanna follows him to offer comfort. When he tries to kiss her, she rejects him, upsetting him even more. Accompanied by Peter, Duncan sneaks away to Water Wizz, where Owen is throwing a going-away party for Lewis.

Duncan spends the night with his friends at Water Wizz, refusing to leave in the morning. He opens up to Owen about his home situation, and how Water Wizz is the only place where he feels accepted. A sympathetic Owen recalls his own upbringing where he was forced to abide by strict rules and advises Duncan to disregard Trent's criticisms and be himself.

When Duncan returns to the beach house, Pam tells him they are all leaving. Betty and her kids arrive to say their goodbyes, and Susanna kisses Duncan. They leave in a station wagon, with Duncan in the rear area ("The Way Way Back"). When Trent stops for gas on their way out of town, Duncan jumps out of the station wagon and runs to Water Wizz, followed by his mother, Trent, and Steph. Duncan tells Owen and the other employees that he has to leave, and goes with Owen to the Devil's Peak slide. Duncan becomes the first person ever to pass someone in the water slide while the rest of the park staff and attendees watch.

After introducing Owen to his mother, Duncan bids everyone at the park goodbye. Owen speaks fondly of Duncan to Pam, and introduces himself to Trent as "a good friend of the 'three'". Duncan hugs Owen and thanks him for his kindness. Trent, Steph, Pam, and Duncan regroup in the station wagon, where Pam finally stands up for herself as they head out of town. Pam climbs to the back area of the station wagon where Duncan is sitting, despite Trent's protests, and they share a smile.

== Cast ==
- Steve Carell as Trent Ramsey, Pam's boyfriend
- Toni Collette as Pam, Duncan's mother
- Liam James as Duncan
- Sam Rockwell as Owen
- Maya Rudolph as Caitlin
- Allison Janney as Betty Thompson, Susanna's mother
- AnnaSophia Robb as Susanna Thompson
- Rob Corddry as Kip
- Amanda Peet as Joan
- Jim Rash as Lewis
- Nat Faxon as Roddy
- Robert Capron as Kyle
- River Alexander as Peter Thompson
- Ava Deluca-Verley as Katy
- Zoe Levin as Steph Ramsey
- Adam Riegler as Neil
- Jake Picking as Chad

== Reception ==
=== Box office ===
The film had its premiere screening at the 2013 Sundance Film Festival. It was one of the most financially successful films to come out of the festival that year, outperforming well-known entries and Oscar-nominated films from the previous year. It was released on July 5, 2013 in 19 theaters and surpassed box office expectations, averaging an impressive $30,263 per screen and grossing $525,000 for the weekend. On July 15, 2013, it was added to an additional 60 theaters and grossed $1.1 million. It ended up earning $21.5 million in North America and $5 million elsewhere, for a total of $26.5 million.

=== Critical response ===
On the review aggregator website Rotten Tomatoes, 83% of 183 critics' reviews are positive. The website's consensus reads: "Despite its familiar themes, The Way Way Back makes use of its talented cast, finely tuned script, and an abundance of charm to deliver a funny and satisfying coming-of-age story." Metacritic, which uses a weighted average, assigned the film a score of 68 out of 100, based on 41 critics, indicating "generally favorable" reviews.

Inkoo Kang of The Village Voice called the film "a crowd-pleasing summer treat, predictable in its sweetness but satisfying all the same". BBC Radio 5 Live film critic Mark Kermode praised the performances of Sam Rockwell, Toni Collette, Allison Janney and Maya Rudolph and similarly reasoned that while "it's not world-changing, or earth-shattering" the film is "really sweet and funny". David Gritten of The Daily Telegraph also praised the scene-stealing performances of Janney and Rockwell, concluding that despite a flood of similar coming-of-age films released in 2013 the film "feels warm, funny—and even fresh". Catherine Shoard of The Guardian gave the film a positive review, concluding that "for all the longueurs, there are still enough moments of near brilliance to sustain you through the trip". Betsy Sharkey of the Los Angeles Times commended the film's quirky dialogue and cast performances, calling the film "witty, heartwarming, hopeful, sentimental, searing and relatable".

Sam Rockwell's performance was met with critical praise, with many critics agreeing that his performance was deserving of an Academy Award nomination. MaryAnn Johanson of Flick Filosopher said that Rockwell "makes the biggest splash with a sizzling supporting performance. Not only is he naturally funny, but he has the great ability to make every sharp line of dialogue sound freshly improvised."

A.A. Dowd of The A.V. Club gave the film a C+, describing it as "generically constructed" and "never as refreshing as it's constantly straining to be".

=== Home media ===
The Way, Way Back was released on DVD and Blu-ray on October 22, 2013, by 20th Century Fox Home Entertainment. Blu-ray extras included deleted scenes, behind-the-scenes featurettes Tour of the Water Park and The Filmmakers: Jim and Nat, and ensemble featurettes.

=== Accolades ===
List of Awards and Nominations
Award	Category	Recipients	Result
AARP Movies for Grownups Awards	Best Comedy	The Way, Way Back	Won
Critics' Choice Movie Awards	Best Comedy		Nominated
Critics' Choice Movie Awards	Best Actor in a Comedy	Sam Rockwell	Nominated
Critics' Choice Movie Awards	Best Young Actor/Actress	Liam James	Nominated
MTV Movie Awards	Best Breakthrough Performance	Liam James	Nominated
Online Film Critics Society	Best Supporting Actor	Sam Rockwell	Nominated
Phoenix Film Critics Society Awards 2013	Best Actor in a Supporting Role	Sam Rockwell	Nominated
Phoenix Film Critics Society Awards 2013	Best Ensemble Acting		Nominated
Phoenix Film Critics Society Awards 2013	Breakthrough Performance on Camera	Liam James	Nominated
Phoenix Film Critics Society Awards 2013	Best Performance by a Youth in a Lead or Supporting Role – Male	Liam James	Nominated
San Diego Film Critics Society	Best Supporting Actor	Sam Rockwell	Nominated
San Diego Film Critics Society	Best Ensemble Performance		Nominated
St. Louis Gateway Film Critics Association	Best Comedy		Nominated
Washington D.C. Area Film Critics Association	Best Acting Ensemble		Nominated
Washington D.C. Area Film Critics Association	Best Youth Performance	Liam James	Nominated
Young Artist Awards	Best Leading Young Actor in a Feature Film	Liam James	Nominated
Young Artist Awards	Best Supporting Young Actor in a Feature Film	River Alexander	Nominated

== Soundtrack ==
Heather Phares of AllMusic gave the film's soundtrack 7 out of 10 stars, saying:

The charming coming of age comedy The Way Way Back soundtracks its tale of 14-year-old Duncan's fateful summer working at the Water Wizz water park with bouncy '80s hits and indie rock. ... While the collection isn't as consistent as the soundtracks to like-minded films such as Juno or Little Miss Sunshine, it still has enough personality to be an entertaining set of songs.

1. "For the Time Being" – Edie Brickell/The Gaddabouts
2. "Kyrie" – Mr. Mister
3. "Out the Door" – Ben Kweller
4. "Come and See" – Young Galaxy
5. "Running Wild" – Army Navy
6. "Young Blood" – UFO
7. "Shine" – Wild Belle
8. "New Sensation" – INXS
9. "Sneaking Sally Through the Alley" – Robert Palmer
10. "Young at Heart" – The Rondo Brothers/Tim Myers
11. "Recess" – Eli "Paperboy" Reed
12. "Power Hungry Animals" – The Apache Relay
13. "Alone" – Trampled by Turtles
14. "Go Where the Love Is" – Edie Brickell/The Gaddabouts
15. "The Way Way Back" – Rob Simonsen

Other songs

- "Can't Fight This Feeling" – REO Speedwagon
